= Trip on This: The Remixes =

Remix album by Technotronic
- Released: September 18, 1990
- Recorded: 1989–1990
- Label: ARS Entertainment (Belgium); Telstar (United Kingdom); SBK/EMI (North America)
- Producer: Jo Bogaert

Technotronic chronology
| Pump Up the Jam (1989) | Trip on This: The Remixes (1990) | Body to Body (1991) |

Singles from Trip on This: The Remixes
- 1. "Megamix" Released: 18 October 1990; 2. "Turn It Up" Released: 22 December 1990

Alternative Cover
- North American edition

Professional ratings
Review scores
| Source | Rating |
|---|---|
| AllMusic | 3/5 stars |
| The Rolling Stone Album Guide | 3/5 stars |

Trip on This: The Remixes is a remix album by Belgian dance act Technotronic, released in 1990. While it is mainly made up of remixes of tracks from the previous year's Pump Up the Jam album, Trip on This also contains new tracks, and all mixes are exclusive to this release.

The album features a number of high-profile remixers and producers including Shep Pettibone, David Morales, the Dust Brothers, Bernard Sumner, Todd Terry, Kenny "Dope" Gonzalez, Junior Vasquez, and Mastermixers Unity.

As well as featuring remixed versions of four singles from Technotronic's previous album, Trip on This also includes a remix of the hit single from earlier in the year, "Spin That Wheel" (originally released under the pseudonym Hi Tek 3), plus two further singles that were taken from the album, including "Megamix" which reached number one on the Eurochart Hot 100 and the top 10 in the United Kingdom, Ireland, Switzerland, Germany and France.

The album was released in the UK by compilation specialist Telstar Records and reached number seven in the UK Albums Chart. In the UK it was certified Silver and was certified Gold in Canada.

== Track listing ==
=== International version ===
| No. | Title | Writer(s) | Length |
|---|---|---|---|
| 1. | "Techno Medley" (Pettibone Mix) | Jo Bogaert; Manuela Kamosi | 8:32 |
| 2. | "Spin That Wheel" (Morales Spinster Mix) | Kamosi; Kovali; El Sati | 5:35 |
| 3. | "This Beat Is Technotronic" (Dust Mix) | Bogaert; Eric Martin | 4:14 |
| 4. | "Get Up" (Happy Jack Remix) | Bogaert; Kamosi | 7:18 |
| 5. | "Raw Update" | Bogaert | 5:08 |
| 6. | "Turn It Up" | Bogaert; Einstein; Melissa | 5:28 |
| 7. | "Rockin' Over the Beat" (Rockin' Over Manchester Hacienda Mix) | Bogaert; Kamosi | 6:33 |
| 8. | "Pump Up the Jam" (Terry Dome Mix) | Bogaert; Kamosi | 5:26 |
| 9. | "Take It Slow" (Fab Bibulous Mix) | Bogaert; Kamosi | 5:17 |
| 10. | "Megamix" (Hit Radio Version) | Bogaert; Kamosi; Martin | 4:18 |

=== US version ===
| No. | Title | Writer(s) | Length |
|---|---|---|---|
| 1. | "Techno Medley" (Pettibone Mix) | Bogaert; Kamosi | 8:32 |
| 2. | "Spin That Wheel" (Morales Spinster Mix) | Kamosi; Kovali; El Sati | 5:35 |
| 3. | "This Beat Is Technotronic" (Dust Mix) | Bogaert; Martin | 4:14 |
| 4. | "Get Up" (Happy Jack Remix) | Bogaert; Kamosi | 7:18 |
| 5. | "Rockin' Over the Beat" (Rockin' Over Manchester Hacienda Mix) | Bogaert; Kamosi | 6:33 |
| 6. | "Pump Up the Jam" (Terry Dome Mix) | Bogaert; Kamosi | 5:26 |
| 7. | "Take It Slow" (Fab Bibulous Mix) | Bogaert; Kamosi | 5:17 |
| 8. | "Raw Update" | Bogaert | 5:08 |
| 9. | "Techno Medley" (Pettibone Mix) | Bogaert; Kamosi | 4:00 |

Note

- Despite their identical titles, track 9 is an alternative edit of track 1.

== Personnel ==
Adapted from the album's liner notes.

=== Musicians ===
- Manuela "Ya Kid K" Kamosi – vocals ("Techno Medley", "Spin That Wheel", "Get Up", "Rockin' Over the Beat", "Pump Up the Jam", "Take It Slow", "Megamix")
- Eric "MC Eric" Martin – vocals ("Techno Medley", "This Beat Is Technotronic", "Megamix")
- Melissa Beckford – vocals ("Turn It Up")
- Colin "Einstein" Case – vocals ("Turn It Up")
- Jo Bogaert – additional instrumentation
- David Morales – percussion ("Spin That Wheel")
- Satoshi Tomiie – keyboard programming ("Spin That Wheel")
- Eric Kupper – keyboard programming ("Spin That Wheel")
- Doug Grigsby – additional keyboards ("Get Up")

=== Production ===
- Jo Bogaert – producer, additional production, programming & remixing
- Shep Pettibone – post production & remix ("Techno Medley")
- Goh Hotoda – remix engineer ("Techno Medley")
- Alan Friedman – additional programming ("Techno Medley")
- Tony Shimkin – editing ("Techno Medley")
- David Morales – additional production & remix ("Spin That Wheel")
- John Poppo – engineer ("Spin That Wheel")
- Dust Brothers (John King & Michael Simpson) – additional production & remix ("This Beat Is Technotronic")
- Mario Caldato Jr. – remix engineer ("This Beat Is Technotronic")
- Keith KC Cohen – additional production & remix ("Get Up")
- Doug Grigsby – programming ("Get Up")
- Steve Beltran – special edit ("Get Up")
- Andy Batwinas – engineer ("Get Up")
- Spencer Henderson – engineer ("Raw Update"), mix engineer ("Rockin' Over the Beat")
- Bernard Sumner – additional production & mixing ("Rockin' Over the Beat")
- Andrew Robinson – programming ("Rockin' Over the Beat")
- Todd Terry – remix, reconstruction & engineer ("Pump Up the Jam")
- Mike Rodgers – engineer ("Pump Up the Jam")
- Merv Depeyer – keyboards ("Pump Up the Jam")
- Kenny "Dope" Gonzalez – production assistant ("Pump Up the Jam")
- Junior Vasquez – additional production, remix & editing ("Take It Slow")
- Rob Paustian – remix engineer ("Take It Slow")
- Fred McFarlane – additional programming ("Take It Slow")
- Mastermixers Unity – remix ("Megamix")

== Charts ==
Chart performance for Trip on This: The Remixes
| Chart (1990–1991) | Peak position |
|---|---|
| Australian Albums (ARIA) | 50 |
| French Albums (SNEP) | 38 |
| UK Albums (OCC) | 7 |

== Certifications and sales ==
Certifications and sales for Trip on This: The Remixes
| Region | Certification | Certified units/sales |
|---|---|---|
| Canada (Music Canada) | Gold | 50,000^{^} |
| Italy | — | 170,000 |
| United Kingdom (BPI) | Gold | 100,000^{^} |
^{^} Shipments figures based on certification alone.
