= List of UK top-ten singles in 1990 =

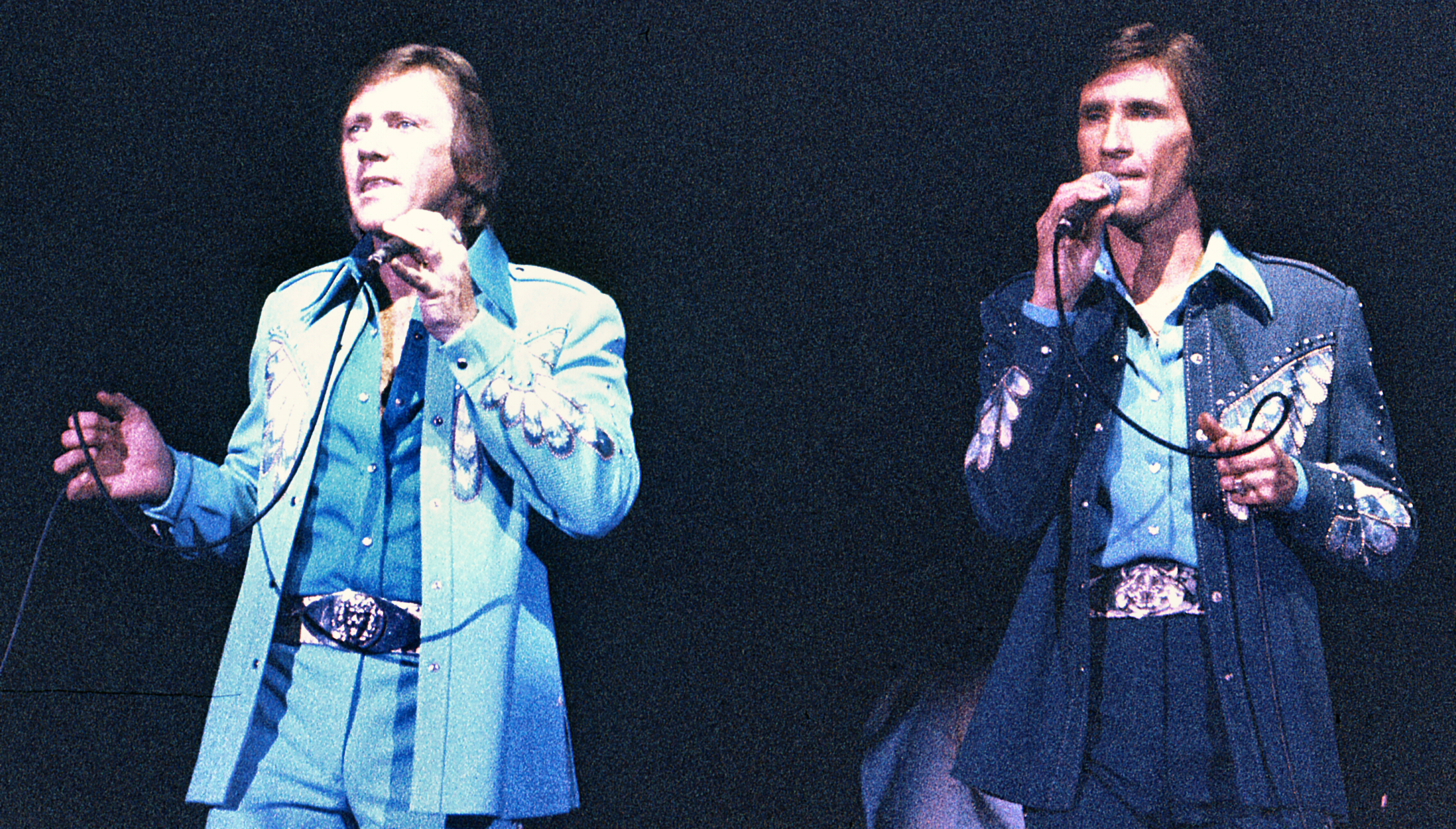
The Righteous Brothers achieved the best-selling single of 1990 with a re-issue of "Unchained Melody", which spent four weeks at number-one. The song had originally peaked at number 14 in the UK upon its initial release in 1965. Later in the year, a re-release of "You've Lost That Lovin' Feelin'" coupled with "Ebb Tide" also made the top 10, reaching number three.

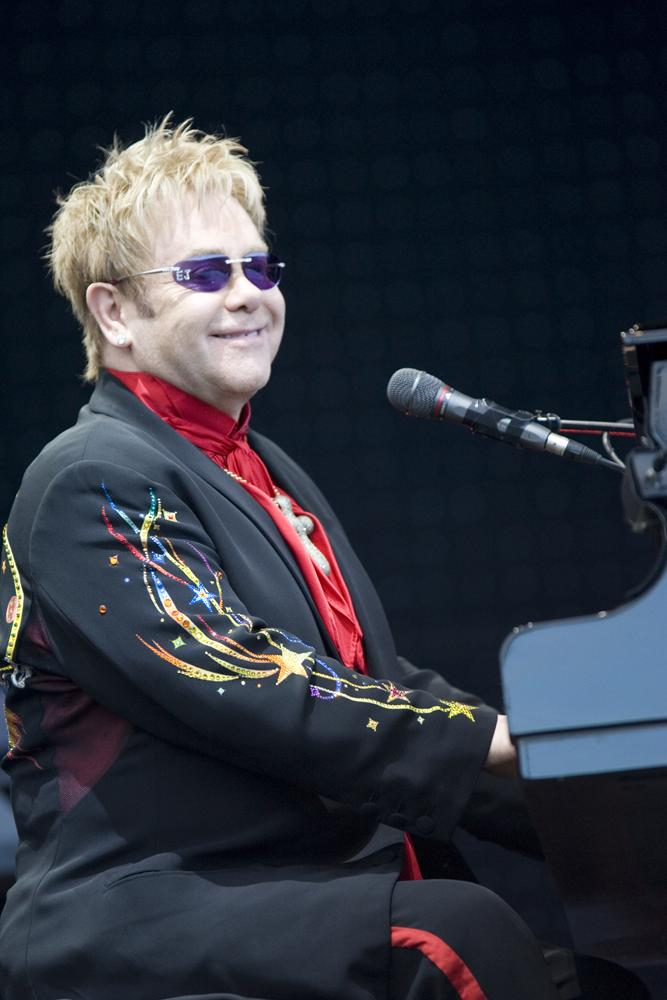
Elton John scored his first UK number-one single as a solo artist in June of this year with "Sacrifice"/"Healing Hands", which spent five weeks at the top spot and became the third best selling single of the year.

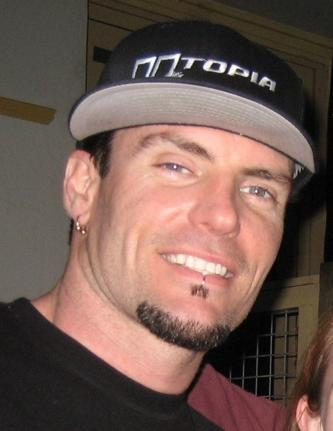
American hip-hop artist Vanilla Ice spent four weeks at number-one with "Ice Ice Baby", which became the fourth best selling single of 1990.

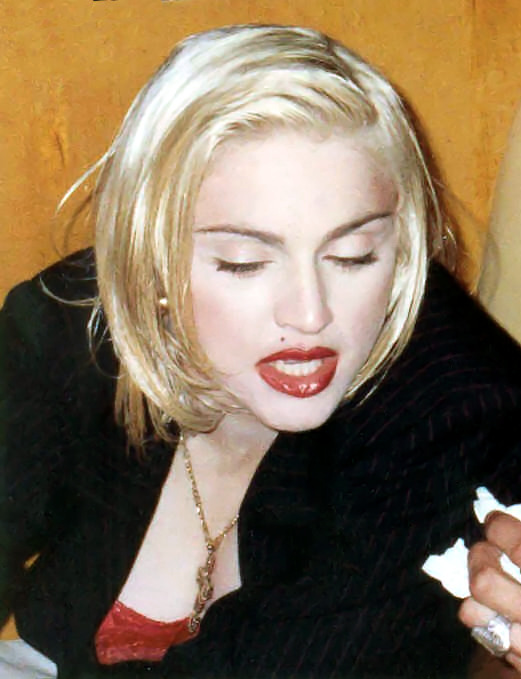
Madonna scored four UK top 10 entries this year, including the number-one hit "Vogue".

The UK Singles Chart is one of many music charts compiled by the Official Charts Company that calculates the best-selling singles of the week in the United Kingdom. Before 2004, the chart was only based on the sales of physical singles. This list shows singles that peaked in the Top 10 of the UK Singles Chart during 1990, as well as singles which peaked in 1989 and 1991 but were in the top 10 in 1990. The entry date is when the single appeared in the top 10 for the first time (week ending, as published by the Official Charts Company, which is six days after the chart is announced).

One-hundred and forty-two singles were in the top ten in 1990. Eight singles from 1989 remained in the top 10 for several weeks at the beginning of the year, while "Pray by MC Hammer, "Sadeness (Part I)" by Enigma and "The Grease Megamix" by John Travolta and Olivia Newton-John" were all released in 1990 but did not reach their peak until 1991. Thirty artists scored multiple entries in the top 10 in 1990. Adamski, Happy Mondays, MC Hammer, Mariah Carey and Snap! were among the many artists who achieved their first UK charting top 10 single in 1990.

The 1989 Christmas number-one, "Do They Know It's Christmas?" by Band Aid II, remained at number-one for the first week of 1990. The first new number-one single of the year was "Hangin' Tough" by New Kids on the Block. Overall, eighteen different singles peaked at number-one in 1990, with Cliff Richard and Kylie Minogue (2, including the Band Aid II charity single) having the joint most singles hit that position.

== Background ==
=== Multiple entries ===
One-hundred and forty-two singles charted in the top 10 in 1990, with one-hundred and thirty-one singles reaching their peak this year.

Thirty artists scored multiple entries in the top 10 in 1990. American boyband New Kids on the Block secured the record for most top ten singles in 1990 with eight hit singles. "Hangin' Tough" reached number-one, where it remained for two weeks, and a further three weeks in the top ten. Other entries included "Step by Step" (number 2), "Tonight" (3) and "Cover Girl" (4). Former Neighbours actress Kylie Minogue had three top ten singles in 1990. "Tears on My Pillow" spent one week at number-one in January; "Better the Devil You Know" (2) and "Step Back in Time" (4) also reached the top ten. Madonna continued her success from the 1980s with four more top ten hits in 1990. "Vogue" was the highest entry, peaking at number-one for 1 week in April; "Dear Jessie", "Hanky Panky" and "Justify My Love" were the other singles to reach the top 10.

Rapper and DJ MC Hammer had three top-ten entries, including his biggest hit and signature song, "U Can't Touch This", which peaked at number 3 in August. Cliff Richard, Jimmy Somerville and Jive Bunny and the Mastermixers were the other artists to reach the top 10 with three singles in 1990.

Beats International were one of a number of artists with two top-ten entries, including the number-one single "Dub Be Good to Me". Adamski, Black Box, Happy Mondays, Michael Bolton and The Stone Roses were among the other artists who had multiple top 10 entries in 1990.

=== Chart debuts ===
Seventy artists achieved their first top 10 single in 1990, either as a lead or featured artist. Of these, eight went on to record another hit single that year: Adamski, Beats International, The Farm, Happy Mondays, Mantronix, Michael Bolton, Paul "Gazza" Gascoigne and Ya Kid K. MC Hammer had two more top 10 singles in 1990. Snap! had three other entries in their breakthrough year.

The following table (collapsed on desktop site) does not include acts who had previously charted as part of a group and secured their first top 10 solo single.

Artist	Number of top 10s	First entry	Chart position	Other	
De La Soul	1	"The Magic Number"/"Buddy"	7	—	
49ers	1	"Touch Me"	3	—	
Rob'n'Raz	1	"Got to Get"	8	—	
Leila K	1	"Got to Get"	8	—	
Mantronix	2	"Got to Have Your Love"	4	"Take Your Time" (10)	
Wondress	1	"Got to Have Your Love"	4	–	
Nuff Juice	1	"Put Your Hands Together"	7	—	
FPI Project	1	"Going Back to My Roots"/"Rich in Paradise"	9	—	
Sinéad O'Connor	1	"Nothing Compares 2 U"	1	—	
Halo James	1	"Could Have Told You So"	6	—	
Ya Kid K	2	"Get Up! (Before the Night Is Over)"	2	"Rockin' Over the Beat" (9)	
Lonnie Gordon	1	"Happenin' All Over Again"	4	—	
Sybil	1	"Walk On By"	6	—	
Yell!	1	"Instant Replay"	10	—	
Beats International	2	"Dub Be Good to Me"	1	"Won't Talk About It" (9)	
Lindy Layton	1	"Dub Be Good to Me"	1	—	
Michael Bolton	2	"How Am I Supposed to Live Without You"	3	"How Can We Be Lovers?" (10)	
Guru Josh	1	"Infinity"	5	—	
JT and the Big Family	1	"Moments in Soul"	7	—	
The B-52's	1	"Love Shack"	2	—	
Candy Dulfer	1	"Lily Was Here"	6	—	
Candy Flip	1	"Strawberry Fields Forever"	3	—	
Snap!	4	"The Power"	1	"Ooops Up" (5), "Cult of Snap" (8), "Mary Had a Little Boy" (8)	
They Might Be Giants	1	"Birdhouse in Your Soul"	6	—	
Bizz Nizz	1	"Don't Miss the Party Line"	7	—	
Alannah Myles	1	"Black Velvet"	2	—	
Happy Mondays	2	"Step On"	5	"Kinky Afro" (5)	
Adamski	2	"Killer"	1	"The Space Jungle" (7)	—
The Family Stand	1	"Ghetto Heaven"	10	—	
The Adventures of Stevie V	1	"Dirty Cash (Money Talks)"	2	—	
En Vogue	1	"Hold On"	5	—	
The Chimes	1	"I Still Haven't Found What I'm Looking For"	6	—	
Wondress	1	"Take Your Time"	10	—	
Englandneworder	1	"World in Motion"	1	—	
Paul "Gazza" Gascoigne	2	"World in Motion"	1	"Fog on the Tyne (Revisited)" (2)	
Don Pablo's Animals	1	"Venus"	4	—	
Chad Jackson	1	"Hear the Drummer (Get Wicked)"	3	—	
The Charlatans	1	"The Only One I Know"	9	—	
Wilson Phillips	1	"Hold On"	6	—	
Luciano Pavarotti	1	"Nessun Dorma"	2	—	
Craig McLachlan	1	"Mona (I Need You Baby)"	2	—	
Check 1–2	1	"Mona (I Need You Baby)"	2	—	
MC Hammer	3	"U Can't Touch This"	3	"Have You Seen Her" (8), "Pray" (8) ^{[A]}	
MC Tunes	1	"The Only Rhyme That Bites"	10	—	
F.A.B.	1	"Thunderbirds Are Go"	5	—	
MC Parker	1	"Thunderbirds Are Go"	5	—	
Partners in Kryme	1	"Turtle Power!"	1	—	
Blue Pearl	1	"Naked in the Rain"	4	—	
The Soup Dragons	1	"I'm Free"	5	—	
Junior Reid	1	"I'm Free"	5	—	
DNA	1	"Tom's Diner"	2	—	
Suzanne Vega	1	"Tom's Diner"	2	—	
Bombalurina	1	"Itsy Bitsy Teenie Weenie Yellow Polkadot Bikini"	1	—	
Deee-Lite	1	"Groove Is in the Heart"/"What Is Love"	1	—	
The KLF	1	"What Time Is Love?"	5	—	
Mariah Carey	1	"Vision of Love"	9	—	
Maria McKee	1	"Show Me Heaven"	1	—	
The Farm	2	"Groovy Train"	6	"All Together Now" (4)	
Londonbeat	1	"I've Been Thinking About You"	2	—	
Bassomatic	1	"Fascinating Rhythm"	9	—	
Bobby Vinton	1	"Blue Velvet"	2	—	
Twenty 4 Seven	1	"I Can't Stand It!"	7	—	
Captain Hollywood	1	"I Can't Stand It!"	7	—	
Vanilla Ice	1	"Ice Ice Baby"	1	—	
EMF	1	"Unbelievable"	3	—	
Julee Cruise	1	"Falling"	7	—	
Patrick Macnee	1	"Kinky Boots"	5	—	
Honor Blackman	1	"Kinky Boots"	5	—	
Chris Isaak	1	"Wicked Game"	10	—	
Enigma	1	"Sadeness (Part I)" ^{[B]}	1	—	

Notes

Jimmy Somerville had a successful career as a member of Communards and Bronski Beat prior to 1990, and had also participated on the Band Aid II charity single. His cover of "You Make Me Feel (Mighty Real)" became his first solo top 10 single. David A. Stewart had his first top 10 credit in 1990 without music partner Annie Lennox and the band Eurythmics, whose songs included "Sweet Dreams (Are Made of This)". "Lily Was Here" reached number 6 in March.

Englandneworder was a collaboration between New Order and members of the England squad selected for the 1990 FIFA World Cup, including John Barnes contributing the main rap and Paul "Gazza" Gascoigne on vocals. The KLF first appeared in the chart under the pseudonym The Timelords, but their first official single under their new name came this year.

Along with her late sister Mel, Kim Appleby had entered the top 10 on several occasions as the duo Mel and Kim, including 1987's number-one single "Respectable". "Don't Worry" was her first hit on her own.

=== Songs from films ===
Original songs from various films entered the top 10 throughout the year. These included "Tears On My Pillow" (from The Delinquents), "It Must Have Been Love" (Pretty Woman), "Turtle Power!" (Teenage Mutant Ninja Turtles), "Show Me Heaven" (Days Of Thunder) and "Unchained Melody" (Ghost).

Additionally, "Hanky Panky" was used to promote the film Dick Tracy and appeared on the soundtrack album although the song itself did not appear in the actual film.

=== Best-selling singles ===
The Righteous Brothers had the best-selling single of the year with a reissue of their 1965 hit "Unchained Melody". The single spent nine weeks in the top 10 (including four weeks at number one), sold over 840,000 copies and was certified platinum by the BPI. "Nothing Compares 2 U" by Sinéad O'Connor came in second place, selling more than 600,000 copies and losing out by around 240,000 sales. Elton John's "Sacrifice"/"Healing Hands", "Ice Ice Baby" from Vanilla Ice and "Killer" by Adamski made up the top five. Singles by Maria McKee, Beats International featuring Lindy Layton, Madonna, Englandneworder and Snap! were also in the top ten best-selling singles of the year.

== Top-ten singles ==
Key

Symbol	Meaning
‡	Single peaked in 1989 but still in chart in 1990.
♦	Single released in 1990 but peaked in 1991.
(#)	Year-end top-ten single position and rank
Entered	The date that the single first appeared in the chart.
Peak	Highest position that the single reached in the UK Singles Chart.

Entered (week ending)	Weeks in top 10	Single	Artist	Peak	Peak reached (week ending)	Weeks at peak
Singles in 1989
18 November 1989	7	"You Got It (The Right Stuff)" ‡ ^{[C]}	New Kids on the Block	1	25 November 1989	3
2 December 1989	7	"Lambada" ‡	Kaoma	4	9 December 1989	1
9 December 1989	7	"Get a Life" ‡	Soul II Soul	3	16 December 1989	3
9 December 1989	7	"When You Come Back to Me" ‡	Jason Donovan	2	16 December 1989	3
16 December 1989	4	"Let's Party" ‡	Jive Bunny and the Mastermixers	1	16 December 1989	1
16 December 1989	5	"Dear Jessie" ‡	Madonna	5	30 December 1989	3
16 December 1989	4	"Donald Where's Your Troosers?" ‡	Andy Stewart	4	30 December 1989	1
23 December 1989	4	"Do They Know It's Christmas?" ‡ ^{[D]}	Band Aid II	1	23 December 1989	3
Singles in 1990
6 January 1990	2	"The Magic Number"/"Buddy"	De La Soul	7	13 January 1990	1
6 January 1990	5	"Hangin' Tough"	New Kids on the Block	1	13 January 1990	2
13 January 1990	5	"Touch Me"	49ers	3	20 January 1990	1
13 January 1990	3	"Got to Get"	Rob'n'Raz featuring Leila K	8	13 January 1990	2
13 January 1990	1	"Listen to Your Heart"	Sonia	10	13 January 1990	1
20 January 1990	5	"Tears on My Pillow"	Kylie Minogue	1	27 January 1990	1
20 January 1990	5	"Got to Have Your Love"	Mantronix featuring Wondress	4	20 January 1990	2
20 January 1990	3	"You Make Me Feel (Mighty Real)"	Jimmy Somerville	5	20 January 1990	1
20 January 1990	2	"Put Your Hands Together"	D Mob featuring Nuff Juice	7	20 January 1990	1
20 January 1990	2	"Going Back to My Roots"/"Rich in Paradise"	FPI Project	9	27 January 1990	1
27 January 1990	8	"Nothing Compares 2 U" (#2)	Sinéad O'Connor	1	3 February 1990	4
27 January 1990	3	"Could Have Told You So"	Halo James	6	27 January 1990	2
3 February 1990	6	"Get Up! (Before the Night Is Over)"	Technotronic featuring Ya Kid K	2	10 February 1990	2
3 February 1990	4	"Happenin' All Over Again"	Lonnie Gordon	4	10 February 1990	2
3 February 1990	4	"I Wish It Would Rain Down"	Phil Collins	7	10 February 1990	2
10 February 1990	3	"Walk On By"	Sybil	6	17 February 1990	1
10 February 1990	1	"Instant Replay"	Yell!	10	10 February 1990	1
17 February 1990	8	"Dub Be Good to Me" (#7)	Beats International featuring Lindy Layton	1	3 March 1990	4
17 February 1990	4	"I Don't Know Anybody Else"	Black Box	4	24 February 1990	1
17 February 1990	2	"Live Together"	Lisa Stansfield	10	17 February 1990	2
24 February 1990	6	"How Am I Supposed to Live Without You"	Michael Bolton	3	3 March 1990	3
24 February 1990	3	"Enjoy the Silence"	Depeche Mode	6	24 February 1990	3
3 March 1990	4	"The Brits 1990"	Various artists ^{[E]}	2	10 March 1990	2
3 March 1990	2	"Elephant Stone"	The Stone Roses	8	3 March 1990	1
3 March 1990	4	"Infinity"	Guru Josh	5	10 March 1990	2
3 March 1990	1	"Downtown Train"	Rod Stewart	10	3 March 1990	1
10 March 1990	2	"Moments in Soul"	JT and the Big Family	7	17 March 1990	1
17 March 1990	3	"That Sounds Good to Me"	Jive Bunny and the Mastermixers	4	17 March 1990	2
17 March 1990	6	"Love Shack"	The B-52's	2	24 March 1990	3
17 March 1990	4	"Blue Savannah"	Erasure	3	24 March 1990	1
17 March 1990	3	"Lily Was Here"	David A. Stewart featuring Candy Dulfer	6	31 March 1990	1
24 March 1990	3	"I'll Be Loving You (Forever)"	New Kids on the Block	5	24 March 1990	1
24 March 1990	4	"Strawberry Fields Forever"	Candy Flip	3	31 March 1990	2
31 March 1990	7	"The Power" (#10)	Snap!	1	31 March 1990	2
31 March 1990	3	"Birdhouse in Your Soul"	They Might Be Giants	6	7 April 1990	1
7 April 1990	9	"Vogue" (#8)	Madonna	1	14 April 1990	4
7 April 1990	4	"Don't Miss the Party Line"	Bizz Nizz	7	14 April 1990	2
7 April 1990	3	"Hang on to Your Love"	Jason Donovan	8	14 April 1990	1
14 April 1990	6	"Black Velvet"	Alannah Myles	2	21 April 1990	2
14 April 1990	5	"Kingston Town"	UB40	4	14 April 1990	2
14 April 1990	3	"Step On"	Happy Mondays	5	14 April 1990	1
21 April 1990	6	"Opposites Attract"	Paula Abdul with The Wild Pair	2	5 May 1990	1
21 April 1990	3	"All I Wanna Do Is Make Love to You"	Heart	8	21 April 1990	2
28 April 1990	8	"Killer" (#5)	Adamski	1	12 May 1990	4
28 April 1990	2	"Ghetto Heaven"	The Family Stand	10	28 April 1990	2
5 May 1990	6	"Dirty Cash (Money Talks)"	The Adventures of Stevie V	2	12 May 1990	1
5 May 1990	3	"A Dreams a Dream"	Soul II Soul	6	12 May 1990	1
12 May 1990	5	"Better the Devil You Know"	Kylie Minogue	2	19 May 1990	2
12 May 1990	3	"Cover Girl"	New Kids on the Block	4	19 May 1990	2
19 May 1990	5	"Hold On"	En Vogue	5	26 May 1990	2
19 May 1990	2	"Won't Talk About It"	Beats International	9	26 May 1990	1
26 May 1990	3	"I Still Haven't Found What I'm Looking For"	The Chimes	6	26 May 1990	2
26 May 1990	1	"Take Your Time"	Mantronix featuring Wondress	10	26 May 1990	1
2 June 1990	8	"World in Motion" (#9) ^{[F]}	Englandneworder ^{[G]}	1	9 June 1990	2
2 June 1990	3	"Venus"	Don Pablo's Animals	4	9 June 1990	1
2 June 1990	1	"How Can We Be Lovers?"	Michael Bolton	10	2 June 1990	1
9 June 1990	4	"Hear the Drummer (Get Wicked)"	Chad Jackson	3	9 June 1990	2
9 June 1990	4	"Doin' the Do"	Betty Boo	7	16 June 1990	2
9 June 1990	3	"The Only One I Know"	The Charlatans	9	16 June 1990	1
16 June 1990	2	"Step by Step"	New Kids on the Block	2	16 June 1990	1
16 June 1990	9	"Sacrifice"/"Healing Hands" (#3)	Elton John	1	23 June 1990	5
16 June 1990	8	"It Must Have Been Love"	Roxette	3	30 June 1990	2
16 June 1990	4	"Hold On"	Wilson Phillips	6	30 June 1990	1
23 June 1990	5	"Nessun dorma" ^{[H]}	Luciano Pavarotti	2	30 June 1990	3
23 June 1990	5	"Ooops Up"	Snap!	5	30 June 1990	2
30 June 1990	6	"Mona"	Craig McLachlan & Check 1–2	2	21 July 1990	1
30 June 1990	3	"Close to You"	Maxi Priest	7	7 July 1990	1
7 July 1990	8	"U Can't Touch This"	MC Hammer	3	11 August 1990	1
7 July 1990	1	"The Only Rhyme That Bites"	MC Tunes vs. 808 State	10	7 July 1990	1
14 July 1990	2	"One Love"	The Stone Roses	4	14 July 1990	1
14 July 1990	3	"Thunderbirds Are Go"	F.A.B. featuring MC Parker	5	21 July 1990	1
21 July 1990	6	"Turtle Power!"	Partners in Kryme	1	28 July 1990	4
28 July 1990	4	"Hanky Panky"	Madonna	2	4 August 1990	1
28 July 1990	7	"Naked in the Rain"	Blue Pearl	4	11 August 1990	2
28 July 1990	3	"Rockin' Over the Beat"	Technotronic featuring Ya Kid K	9	28 July 1990	2
28 July 1990	5	"I'm Free"	The Soup Dragons featuring Junior Reid	5	11 August 1990	1
4 August 1990	5	"Tom's Diner"	DNA featuring Suzanne Vega	2	11 August 1990	3
11 August 1990	2	"Thieves in the Temple"	Prince	7	11 August 1990	1
11 August 1990	6	"Tonight"	New Kids on the Block	3	1 September 1990	1
18 August 1990	6	"Itsy Bitsy Teeny Weeny Yellow Polka Dot Bikini"	Bombalurina	1	25 August 1990	3
18 August 1990	3	"Listen to Your Heart"/"Dangerous"	Roxette	6	25 August 1990	1
25 August 1990	3	"Praying for Time"	George Michael	6	1 September 1990	1
25 August 1990	4	"Where Are You Baby?"	Betty Boo	3	8 September 1990	1
1 September 1990	4	"Four Bacharach & David Songs (EP)"	Deacon Blue	2	1 September 1990	2
1 September 1990	1	"Can Can You Party"	Jive Bunny and the Mastermixers	8	1 September 1990	1
1 September 1990	1	"Silhouettes"	Cliff Richard	10	1 September 1990	1
8 September 1990	5	"Groove Is in the Heart"/"What Is Love"	Deee-Lite	2	15 September 1990	2
8 September 1990	5	"The Joker"	Steve Miller Band	1	15 September 1990	2
8 September 1990	4	"What Time Is Love?"	The KLF	5	15 September 1990	1
8 September 1990	2	"Rhythm of the Rain"	Jason Donovan	9	8 September 1990	1
15 September 1990	3	"The Space Jungle"	Adamski	7	15 September 1990	1
15 September 1990	2	"Vision of Love"	Mariah Carey	9	15 September 1990	1
22 September 1990	2	"Holy Smoke"	Iron Maiden	3	22 September 1990	1
22 September 1990	8	"Show Me Heaven" (#6)	Maria McKee	1	29 September 1990	4
22 September 1990	3	"Groovy Train"	The Farm	6	29 September 1990	1
29 September 1990	5	"I've Been Thinking About You"	Londonbeat	2	6 October 1990	1
29 September 1990	1	"Cult of Snap"	Snap!	8	29 September 1990	1
29 September 1990	3	"Fascinating Rhythm"	Bassomatic	9	29 September 1990	2
6 October 1990	5	"Blue Velvet"	Bobby Vinton	2	13 October 1990	1
6 October 1990	3	"So Hard"	Pet Shop Boys	4	6 October 1990	1
6 October 1990	5	"The Anniversary Waltz: Part One"	Status Quo	2	20 October 1990	1
6 October 1990	3	"I Can't Stand It!"	Twenty 4 Seven featuring Captain Hollywood	7	6 October 1990	3
13 October 1990	3	"Megamix"	Technotronic	6	13 October 1990	2
13 October 1990	2	"Have You Seen Her"	MC Hammer	8	13 October 1990	1
13 October 1990	7	"A Little Time"	The Beautiful South	1	27 October 1990	1
20 October 1990	1	"Let's Try It Again"/"(Didn't I) Blow Your Mind This Time"	New Kids on the Block	8	20 October 1990	1
27 October 1990	9	"Unchained Melody" (#1) ^{[I]}	The Righteous Brothers	1	3 November 1990	4
27 October 1990	2	"Kinky Afro"	Happy Mondays	5	27 October 1990	1
27 October 1990	4	"I'm Your Baby Tonight"	Whitney Houston	5	3 November 1990	1
27 October 1990	4	"Take My Breath Away" ^{[J]}	Berlin	3	3 November 1990	2
3 November 1990	3	"(We Want) The Same Thing"	Belinda Carlisle	6	3 November 1990	2
3 November 1990	3	"Step Back in Time"	Kylie Minogue	4	10 November 1990	1
10 November 1990	6	"Don't Worry"	Kim Appleby	2	24 November 1990	1
10 November 1990	5	"Fantasy"	Black Box	5	17 November 1990	1
10 November 1990	4	"I'll Be Your Baby Tonight"	Robert Palmer & UB40	6	17 November 1990	1
17 November 1990	2	"Fog on the Tyne (Revisited)" ^{[K]}	Gazza & Lindisfarne	2	17 November 1990	1
24 November 1990	9	"Ice Ice Baby" (#4)	Vanilla Ice	1	1 December 1990	4
24 November 1990	5	"Unbelievable"	EMF	3	1 December 1990	2
24 November 1990	2	"To Love Somebody"	Jimmy Somerville	8	24 November 1990	1
24 November 1990	1	"Cubik"/"Olympic"	808 State	10	24 November 1990	1
1 December 1990	2	"It Takes Two"	Rod Stewart & Tina Turner	5	1 December 1990	1
1 December 1990	2	"Falling" ^{[L]}	Julee Cruise	7	1 December 1990	1
1 December 1990	1	"King of the Road"	The Proclaimers	9	1 December 1990	1
8 December 1990	2	"Kinky Boots" ^{[M]}	Patrick Macnee & Honor Blackman	5	8 December 1990	1
8 December 1990	5	"Saviour's Day"	Cliff Richard	1	29 December 1990	1
8 December 1990	5	"Justify My Love"	Madonna	2	15 December 1990	1
15 December 1990	6	"All Together Now"	The Farm	4	15 December 1990	1
15 December 1990	1	"This One's for the Children"	New Kids on the Block	9	15 December 1990	1
15 December 1990	1	"Wicked Game"	Chris Isaak	10	15 December 1990	1
22 December 1990	4	"You've Lost That Lovin' Feelin'"/"Ebb Tide" ^{[N]}	The Righteous Brothers	3	29 December 1990	1
22 December 1990	7	"Sadeness (Part I)" ♦	Enigma	1	19 January 1991	1
22 December 1990	4	"Mary Had a Little Boy"	Snap!	8	22 December 1990	2
22 December 1990	4	"Pray" ♦	MC Hammer	8	12 January 1991	1
29 December 1990	5	"The Grease Megamix" ♦	John Travolta & Olivia Newton-John	3	12 January 1991	1

== Entries by artist ==
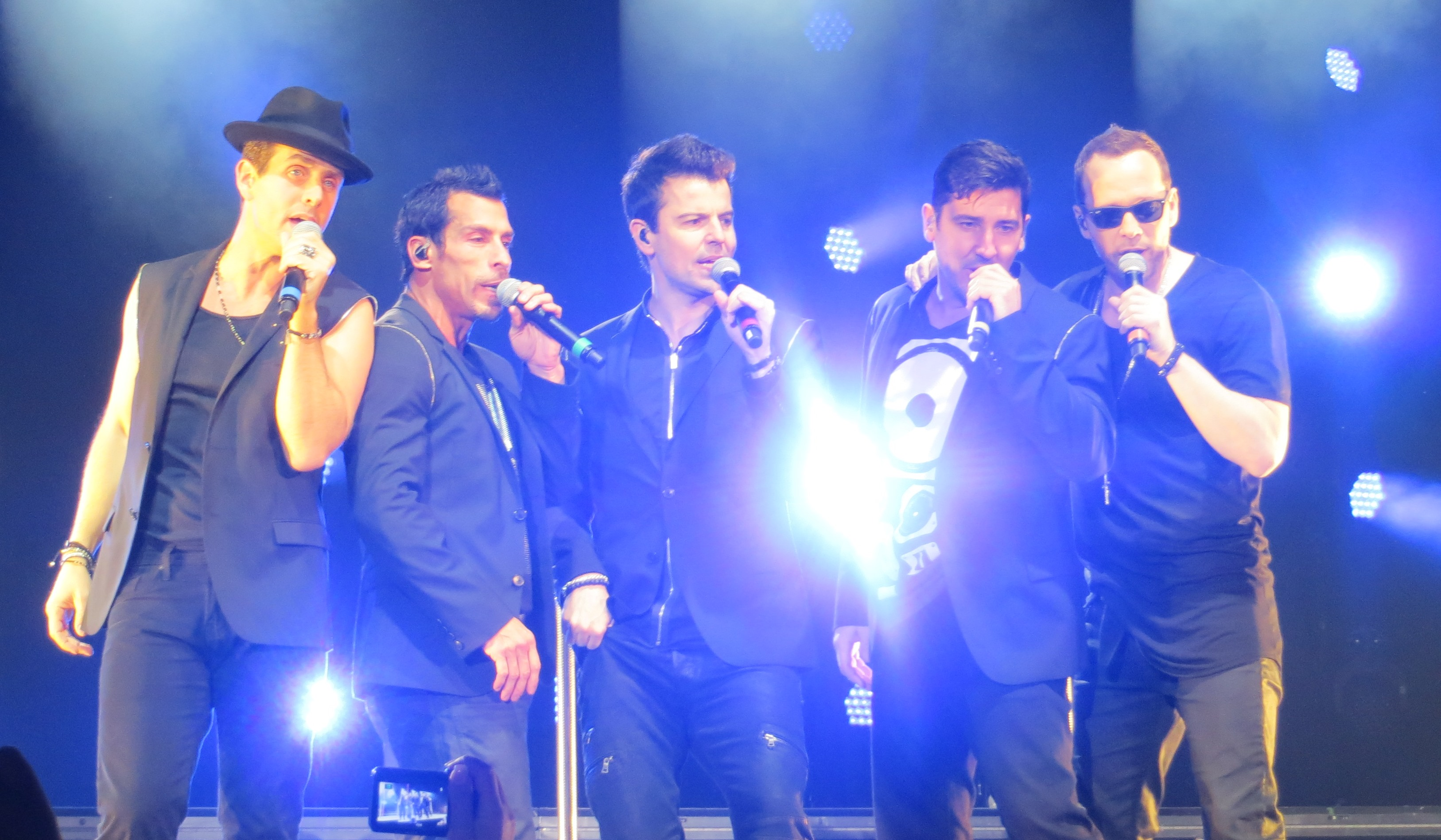
American boy band New Kids on the Block (pictured in 2014) had eight top 10 entries in the UK this year, the most of any artist, including their two number-one singles, "You Got It (The Right Stuff)" (from 1989) and "Hangin' Tough".

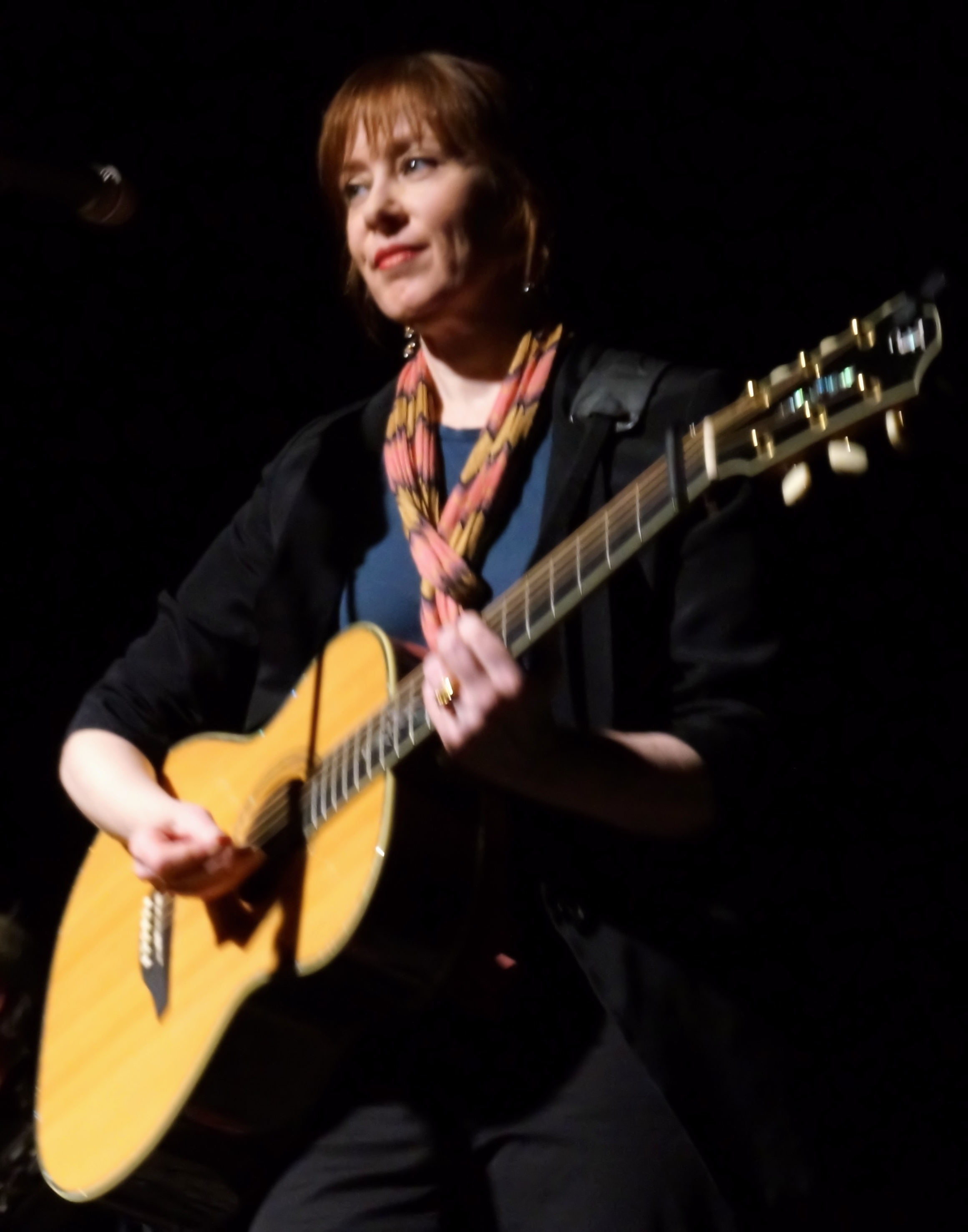
US singer-songwriter Suzanne Vega (pictured in 2014) scored a number two hit in August with a remix of "Tom's Diner" by DNA.

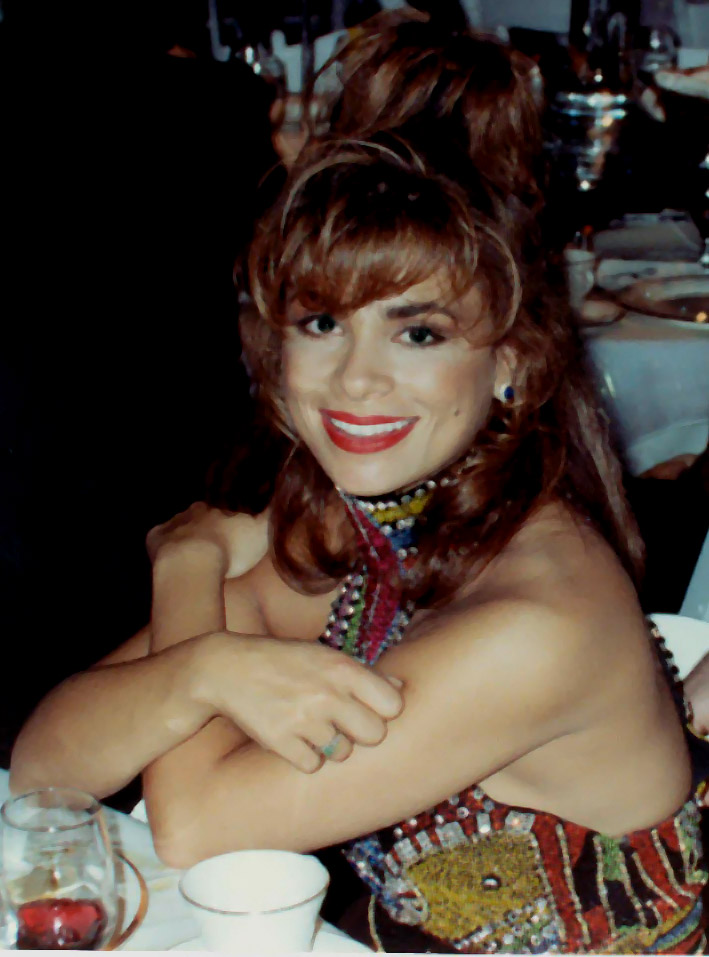
Paula Abdul achieved her highest-charting UK single this year with "Opposites Attract", which reached number two in May.

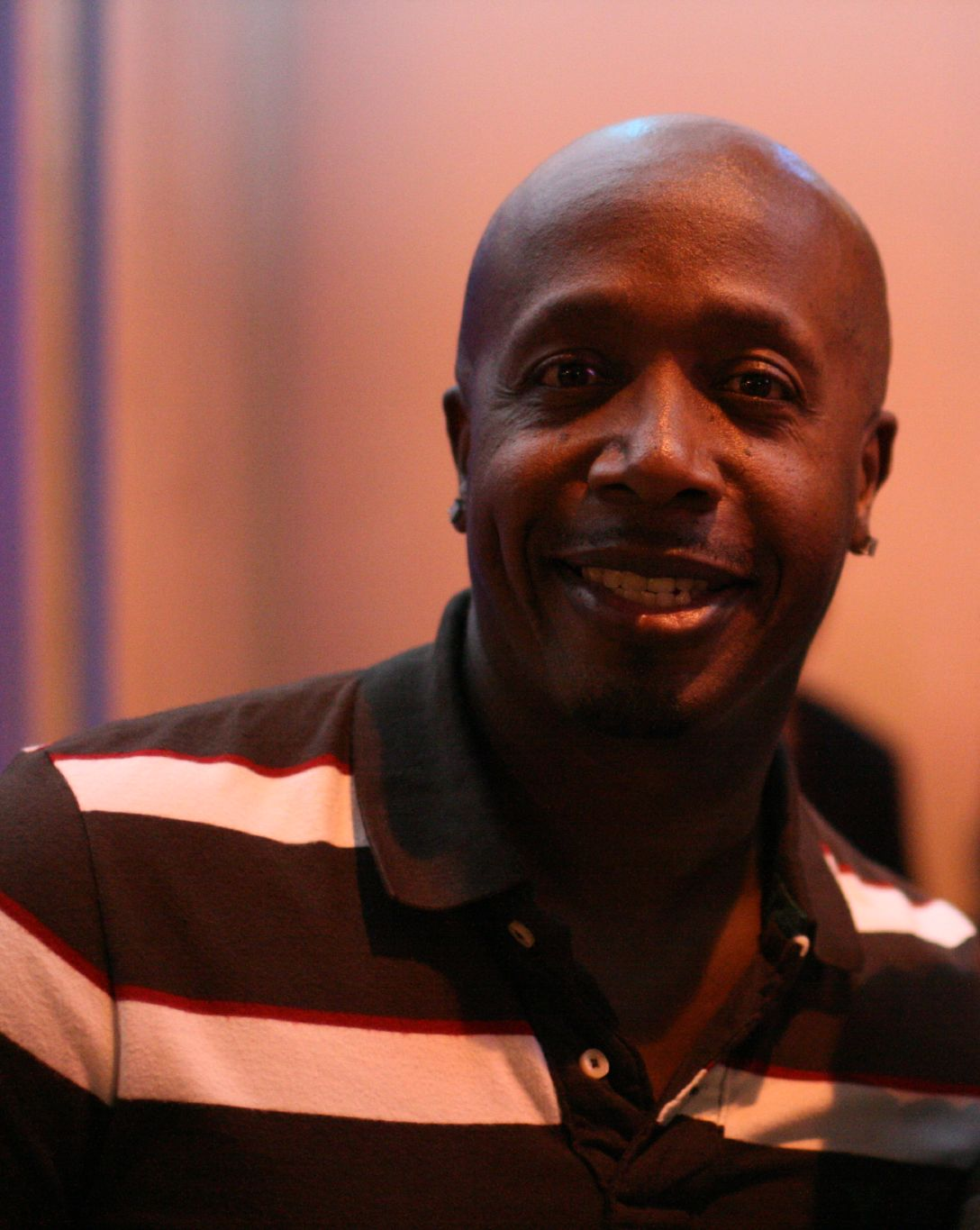
Hip hop artist MC Hammer (pictured in 2008) achieved three top 10 entries this year, the most successful of which was "U Can't Touch This", which reached number three in August.

The following table shows artists who achieved two or more top 10 entries in 1990, including songs that reached their peak in 1989 or 1991. The figures include both main artists and featured artists, while appearances on ensemble charity records are also counted for each artist.

Entries	Artist	Weeks	Singles
8	New Kids on the Block ^{[O]}	22	"Cover Girl", "Hangin' Tough", "I'll Be Loving You (Forever)", "Let's Try It Again"/"(Didn't I) Blow Your Mind This Time", "Step by Step", "Tonight", "This One's for the Children", "You Got It (The Right Stuff)"
4	Jason Donovan ^{[O]}^{[P]}	10	"Do They Know It's Christmas?", "Hang on to Your Love", "Rhythm of the Rain", "When You Come Back to Me"
4	Kylie Minogue ^{[O]}^{[P]}	15	"Better the Devil You Know", "Do They Know It's Christmas?", "Step Back in Time", "Tears on My Pillow"
4	Madonna ^{[O]}	19	"Dear Jessie", "Hanky Panky", "Justify My Love", "Vogue"
4	Snap!	15	"Cult of Snap", "Mary Had a Little Boy", "Ooops Up", "The Power"
4	Technotronic ^{[O]}^{[P]}	14	"Do They Know It's Christmas?", "Get Up! (Before the Night Is Over)", "Megamix", "Rockin' Over the Beat"
3	Cliff Richard ^{[O]}^{[P]}	7	"Do They Know It's Christmas?", "Saviour's Day", "Silhouettes"
3	Jimmy Somerville ^{[O]}^{[P]}	7	"Do They Know It's Christmas?", "To Love Somebody", "You Make Me Feel (Mighty Real)"
3	Jive Bunny and the Mastermixers ^{[O]}	5	"Can Can You Party", "Let's Party", "That Sounds Good to Me"
3	MC Hammer ^{[Q]}	12	"Have You Seen Her", "Pray", "U Can't Touch This"
2	808 State	2	"Cubik"/"Olympic", "The Only Rhyme That Bites"
2	Adamski	11	"Killer", "The Space Jungle"
2	Beats International	10	"Dub Be Good to Me", "Won't Talk About It"
2	Betty Boo	8	"Doin' the Do", "Where Are You Baby?"
2	Black Box	9	"Fantasy", "I Don't Know Anybody Else"
2	D Mob ^{[O]}^{[P]}	4	"Do They Know It's Christmas?", "Put Your Hands Together"
2	The Farm	6	"All Together Now", "Groovy Train"
2	Happy Mondays	5	"Kinky Afro", "Step On"
2	Lisa Stansfield ^{[O]}^{[R]}	4	"Do They Know It's Christmas?", "Live Together"
2	Mantronix	6	"Got to Have Your Love", "Take Your Time"
2	Michael Bolton	7	"How Am I Supposed to Live Without You", "How Can We Be Lovers?"
2	Paul "Gazza" Gascoigne ^{[K]}^{[R]}	10	"Fog on the Tyne (Revisited)", "World in Motion"
2	The Righteous Brothers	13	"Unchained Melody", "You've Lost That Lovin' Feelin'"/"Ebb Tide"
2	Rod Stewart	3	"Downtown Train", "It Takes Two"
2	Roxette	11	"It Must Have Been Love", "Listen to Your Heart"/"Dangerous"
2	Sonia ^{[O]}^{[R]}	3	"Do They Know It's Christmas?", "Listen to Your Heart"
2	Soul II Soul ^{[O]}	6	"A Dreams a Dream", "Get a Life"
2	The Stone Roses	4	"Elephant Stone", "One Love"
2	UB40	9	"I'll Be Your Baby Tonight", "Kingston Town"
2	Ya Kid K ^{[S]}^{[T]}	9	"Get Up! (Before the Night Is Over)", "Rockin' Over the Beat"

== Notes ==
- ^{a} "Pray" reached its peak of number eight on 12 January 1991 (week ending).
- ^{b} "Sadeness (Part I)" reached its peak of number-one on 19 January 1991 (week ending).
- ^{c} "You Got It (The Right Stuff)" re-entered the top 10 at number 10 on 6 January 1990 (week ending).
- ^{d} Released as a charity single by Band Aid in 1989 to aid the continuing efforts towards famine relief in Ethiopia.
- ^{e} "The Brits 1990" was created by Mike Gray but the Official Charts credits it to Various Artists.
- ^{f} "World in Motion" was released as the official single (with the permission of the Football Association) to celebrate England's 1990 FIFA World Cup campaign.
- ^{g} Englandneworder was made up of the group New Order and members of the England squad for the 1990 FIFA World Cup.
- ^{h} "Nessun dorma" was used by the BBC in their coverage of the FIFA World Cup in 1990.
- ^{i} "Unchained Melody" originally peaked at number 14 upon its initial release in 1965. It was re-released after being used in the 1990 film Ghost, topping the chart and becoming the best-selling single of the year.
- ^{j} "Take My Breath Away" originally peaked at number-one upon its initial release in 1986 after the release of Top Gun. It was re-released in 1990 when the film premiered on British television and the song was also used in a commercial for the Peugeot 405.
- ^{k} England footballer Paul Gascoigne was credited by his nickname Gazza for the song "Fog on the Tyne (Revisited)".
- ^{l} "Falling" was the theme song to the ABC television series Twin Peaks.
- ^{m} "Kinky Boots" was first released in 1964 but failed to chart.
- ^{n} "You've Lost That Lovin' Feelin'" originally peaked at number-one upon its initial release in 1965. It previously re-entered the top 10 at number 10 in 1969, number 42 in 1977 and number 87 in 1988. "Ebb Tide" originally peaked at number 48 on its initial release in 1966. In 1990, the two songs were re-issued together as a double A-sided single.
- ^{o} Figure includes single that peaked in 1989.
- ^{p} Figure includes an appearance on the "Do They Know It's Christmas?" charity single by Band Aid II.
- ^{q} Figure includes single that peaked in 1991.
- ^{r} Figure includes vocals on Englandneworder's "World in Motion".
- ^{s} Figure includes appearance on Technotronic's "Get Up! (Before the Night is Over)".
- ^{t} Figure includes appearance on Technotronic's "Rockin' Over the Beat".

== See also ==
- 1990 in British music
- List of number-one singles from the 1990s (UK)
