= Megamix (Technotronic song) =

1990 song by Technotronic

Single by Technotronic

from the album Trip on This: The Remixes
- B-side: "Raw Update" (remix)
- Released: 24 September 1990
- Length: 4:18
- Label: ARS/Clip
- Songwriters: Manuela Kamosi; Jo Bogaert; Thomas de Quincey; J. Mallory; B. Veuleman
- Producer: Jo Bogaert

Technotronic singles chronology
"Rockin' Over the Beat" (1990)	"Megamix" (1990)	"Turn It Up" (1990)

Music video
- "Megamix" on YouTube

"Megamix" is a song by Belgian Eurodance group Technotronic. It was released as a single in September 1990 by ARS/Clip Records and comprises the four previous singles taken from their first studio album, Pump Up the Jam: The Album (1989). The songs featured in the megamix, in order, are "This Beat Is Technotronic", "Get Up! (Before the Night Is Over)", "Rockin' Over the Beat", "Pump Up the Jam", "Special Unity Break", "Move This" (in the club mix only), "Get Up! (Before the Night Is Over)", "This Beat Is Technotronic", and the US mix of "Pump Up the Jam".

"Megamix" peaked within the top 10 in Belgium, Denmark, Finland, France, Ireland, Luxembourg, Switzerland, the United Kingdom, and West Germany. The song is included on European release of their 1990 remix album Trip on This: The Remixes, and their 1993 compilation album The Greatest Hits.

== Track listings ==
- 7-inch single

A. Megamix (radio version) - 4:18
B. Raw Update (remix) – 3:20

- CD maxi (BCM Records [20475])
1. Megamix (club version) – 7:22
2. Megamix (radio version) - 4:18
3. Raw Update (remix) – 5:09
4. Come On (remix) – 3:12

== Charts ==
=== Weekly charts ===
Chart (1990)	Peak position
Australia (ARIA)	13
Belgium (Ultratop 50 Flanders)	8
Denmark (IFPI)	5
Europe (Eurochart Hot 100)	5
Finland (Suomen virallinen lista)	11
France (SNEP)	10
Ireland (IRMA)	4
Israel (Israeli Singles Chart)	5
Luxembourg (Radio Luxembourg)	3
Netherlands (Dutch Top 40)	26
Netherlands (Single Top 100)	18
Switzerland (Schweizer Hitparade)	7
UK Singles (Official Charts)	6
UK Airplay (Music Week)	44
UK Dance (Music Week)	11
West Germany (GfK)	9

=== Year end charts ===
Chart (1990)	Position
Australia (ARIA)	84
Belgium (Ultratop)	79
Europe (Eurochart Hot 100)	75
Germany (Media Control)	61

== Release history ==
Region	Date	Format(s)	Label(s)	Ref.
United Kingdom	24 September 1990	7-inch vinyl; 12-inch vinyl; CD; cassette	Swanyard	
Australia	1 October 1990	7-inch vinyl; 12-inch vinyl; cassette	Possum	
