= Teenage Mutant Ninja Turtles III =

1993 film by Stuart Gillard

- Theatrical release poster
- Directed by: Stuart Gillard
- Written by: Stuart Gillard
- Based on: Characters created by: Kevin Eastman; Peter Laird
- Produced by: Thomas K. Gray; Kim Dawson; David Chan
- Starring: Elias Koteas; Paige Turco; Vivian Wu; Sab Shimono; Stuart Wilson
- Cinematography: David Gurfinkel
- Edited by: William D. Gordean; James R. Symons
- Music by: John Du Prez
- Production company: Golden Harvest
- Distributed by: New Line Cinema (United States); 20th Century Fox (International)
- Release date: March 19, 1993 (United States)
- Running time: 96 minutes
- Countries: United States; Hong Kong
- Language: English
- Budget: $21 million
- Box office: $54.4 million

Teenage Mutant Ninja Turtles III is a 1993 superhero film written and directed by Stuart Gillard, based on the Teenage Mutant Ninja Turtles characters. It is the sequel to Teenage Mutant Ninja Turtles II: The Secret of the Ooze (1991). The film is an American-Hong Kong co-production and stars Elias Koteas, Paige Turco, Vivian Wu, Sab Shimono, and Stuart Wilson. The plot revolves around a mystical scepter which transports the Turtles and April back in time to feudal Japan, where they become embroiled in a conflict between a daimyō and a group of rebellious villagers.

The film was released theatrically in the United States on March 19, 1993, by New Line Cinema. It received mostly negative reviews from critics, with a general consensus that the film did not feature any villains and stories from the original Mirage comics or the 1987 animated series, and the franchise had run its course. The film received moderate box office success, though it was the lowest-grossing entry in the series, grossing $54.4 million against a budget of $21 million.

== Plot ==
In 1603 feudal Japan, samurai capture Prince Kenshin after chasing him into the woods, while a mysterious woman watches nearby. Kenshin later clashes with his father, Lord Norinaga, over his pursuit of war. When English trader Walker arrives offering soldiers and firearms, Kenshin retreats to a temple and discovers an ancient scepter inscribed, “Open wide the gates of time.”

In the present day (New York City, 1991), one year after defeating the Shredder and the Foot Clan (Note: As depicted in Teenage Mutant Ninja Turtles II: The Secret of the Ooze (1991)). April O’Neil buys the same scepter at a flea market and gives it to Splinter. When it activates, April and Kenshin swap places in time. Walker imprisons April, while Kenshin explains what happened to the Turtles. Donatello calculates they have only 60 hours before the scepter loses its power, so the Turtles travel back to rescue her, leaving Casey Jones to watch Kenshin. Four of Norinaga’s honor guards are transported to the present in their place.

Arriving in 1603 disguised as honor guards, the Turtles become separated. Michelangelo is captured by Mitsu, leader of a rebellion against Norinaga, and the scepter disappears. The others rescue April and Whit, a prisoner who resembles Casey. After learning Michelangelo is being held in Mitsu’s village, they follow her there and help defend it from Walker’s men. Michelangelo rescues Mitsu’s younger brother Yoshi from a burning building, earning the villagers’ trust.

The Turtles learn Norinaga plans to attack the village with weapons purchased from Walker. Donatello attempts to create a replacement scepter, but it is accidentally broken. Raphael then discovers Yoshi has been hiding the original. Mitsu admits the villagers kept it so the Turtles would remain and help fight Norinaga.

Whit later betrays the group, kidnaps Mitsu and steals the scepter. The Turtles storm Norinaga’s palace, free the prisoners and join the rebellion in battle. Leonardo defeats Norinaga in a sword duel, while Walker escapes with the scepter. At the docks, the Turtles recover it and Whit, having turned against Walker, launches a flaming boulder that knocks Walker into the river to his death.

Michelangelo and Raphael consider staying in the past, where they feel appreciated, but Mitsu reminds Michelangelo that Kenshin must return. The Turtles activate the scepter and return home, although Michelangelo initially misses the exchange and is briefly left behind. The final honor guard uses the scepter to swap places with him just before its power expires.

Kenshin reunites with Mitsu and Norinaga surrenders. Back in the present, Michelangelo feels down about growing up until Splinter cheers him up with an Elvis Presley impression, prompting the Turtles to dance together.

== Cast ==
- Paige Turco / Hynden Walch (voice) as April O'Neil: A reporter for Channel 3 News.
- Elias Koteas / Peter Linz (voice) as Casey Jones: an ex-hockey player turned vigilante and April's beau from the first film.
  - Whit: An English sellsword who was a prisoner to Lord Norinaga during the Feudal Era.
- Travis A. Moon as Yoshi: Mitsu's brother, a young child whom Michelangelo saved from a burning house and becomes friends with Raphael.
- Mark Caso (in-suit performer) and Brian Tochi (voice) as Leonardo: The leader of the group, dons a blue mask and wields two katana swords.
  - Jim Martin performed the remote facial puppetry for Leonardo, while Larry Lam performed the in-suit martial arts.
- Jim Raposa (in-suit performer) and Corey Feldman (voice) as Donatello: The smartest of the group, dons a purple mask and wields a bo staff.
  - Rick Lyon performed the remote facial puppetry for Donatello, while Steven Ho performed the in-suit martial arts.
- Matt Hill (in-suit performer) and Tim Kelleher (voice) as Raphael: The aggressive member of the group, dons a red mask and wields two sai.
  - Noel MacNeal performed the remote facial puppetry for Raphael, while Hosung Pak performed the in-suit martial arts.
- David Fraser (in-suit performer) and Robbie Rist as Michelangelo: The playful member of the group, dons an orange mask and wields two nunchakus.
  - Gordon Robertson performed the remote facial puppetry for Michelangelo, while Allan Shishir Inocalla performed the in-suit martial arts.
- Stuart Wilson as Walker: A mercenary and weapons marketeer hired by Lord Norinaga.
- John Aylward as Niles: Walker's right hand man
- Sab Shimono as Lord Norinaga: A tyrannical warlord during the Feudal Era.
- Vivian Wu as Mitsu: A rebel leader who stole the scepter.
- Mak Takano as Benkei
- Henry Hayashi as Kenshin: A Japanese samurai and Lord Norinaga's son who switched places with April due to the scepter.
- James Murray (puppeteer/voice) as Splinter: Sensei and father figure of the ninja turtles. Murray was assisted by Lisa Sturz and Tim Lawrence.

Rist and Tochi, who voice Michelangelo and Leonardo, respectively, are the only actors to voice the same characters in all three live-action TMNT movies; Feldman returned as the voice of Donatello after being absent for the second movie.

== Production ==
Principal photography began on June 15 and ended on August 5, 1992.

== Music ==
Teenage Mutant Ninja Turtles III: Original Motion Picture Soundtrack

Soundtrack album by Various artists
- Released: March 9, 1993
- Genres: Pop; hard rock; hip hop; techno; Latin
- Length: 45:01
- Label: SBK
- Producer: Pete Ganbarg

Teenage Mutant Ninja Turtles III: Original Motion Picture Soundtrack was released by SBK Records on March 9, 1993. It features the tracks "Tarzan Boy" by Baltimora and "Can't Stop Rockin'" by ZZ Top.

Track listing
No.	Title	Writer(s)	Artist	Length
1.	"Tarzan Boy"	Maurizio Bassi; Naimy Hackett	Baltimora	3:44
2.	"Can't Stop Rockin'"	Billy Gibbons; Dusty Hill; Frank Beard	ZZ Top	3:03
3.	"Rockin' Over the Beat"	Jo Bogaert; Manuela Kamosi	Technotronic featuring Ya Kid K	5:47
4.	"Conga"	Enrique E. Garcia	The Barrio Boyzz	4:43
5.	"Turtle Jam"	Mike Mangini; Shane Faber	Psychedelic Dust featuring Loose Bruce	3:59
6.	"Fighter"	Rose Windross	Definition of Sound	5:44
7.	"Yoshi's Theme"	John Du Prez	John Du Prez and Ocean Music	3:24
8.	"Turtle Power"	James P. Alpern; Richard A. Usher Jr.	Partners in Kryme	4:22
9.	"Tarzan Boy" (Remix)	Bassi; Hackett	Baltimora	3:44
10.	"Rockin' Over the Beat" (Rockin' Over Manchester Hacienda Remix)	Bogaert; Kamosi	Technotronic featuring Ya Kid K	6:33
Total length:				45:01

== Reception ==
=== Box office ===
Teenage Mutant Ninja Turtles III debuted at number 1 at the U.S. box office with a gross of $12.4 million from 2,087 screens. The film grossed $42.2 million in the United States and Canada, and $12.2 million internationally, giving a worldwide gross of $54.4 million.

=== Critical response ===
The film holds a 19% approval rating and has an average rating of 4.10/10 on Rotten Tomatoes based on 32 reviews, with the consensus: "It's a case of one sequel too many for the heroes in a half shell, with a tired time-travel plot gimmick failing to save the franchise from rapidly diminishing returns". On Metacritic, it has a score of 40 out of 100 based on reviews from 12 critics, indicating "mixed or average reviews".

Michael Wilmington of Los Angeles Times noted that distributors deliberately kept the film away from critics. Despite mild praise for the look of the film, Wilmington called the first film a fluke hit and called this third film "sequel hell". James Berardinelli gave it one out of four stars, citing that "any adults accompanying their kids will have to invent new and interesting ways to stay awake. Not only is this movie aimed at young children, the script could have been written by them". TV Guide gave it two out of four stars and said in their review: "If the time-travel gimmick has to be employed twice in a row then it's probably best to banish these characters to a retirement sewer", when commenting about a possible future film invoking time travel.

TMNT co-creator Peter Laird mentioned in the 2014's Turtle Power documentary that he disliked the film, and Kevin Eastman noted the efforts taken to create it.

What we tried to do with the third movie was to make it as good of a story as we could. We went through a painstaking level of do's and don'ts, what they could and couldn't do. We wanted something that would be good for all ages again. I call movie one the best, movie two the worst, and movie three halfway in between.

— Kevin Eastman (2014)

== Post-release ==
=== Cancelled sequel ===
There were early plans for a fourth installment. Playmates toy catalogues indicated a fourth film would be released in 1996 but it never materialized. A script titled TMNT IV: The Foot Walks Again was written by Craig Shapiro and John Travis, while Peter Laird has released concept designs for a version which he says would have been titled Teenage Mutant Ninja Turtles IV: The Next Mutation. Instead, the TV series Ninja Turtles: The Next Mutation was produced from 1997 to 1998, sharing little with the prior concept work beside the subtitle.

=== Animated film ===
The next theatrical release is a 2007 CGI animated film titled TMNT which references the prior live-action films.

=== Reboot ===
After Viacom bought the franchise in 2009, Paramount Pictures produced and released a reboot in 2014.

== Home media ==
As with both of the previous films, the British PG version was censored due to usage of forbidden weapons (Michelangelo's nunchaku). For these scenes, alternate material was used. The cuts were waived for the DVD release. The German theatrical and video version was based on the censored UK cut; the DVD is uncut.

The film was released to VHS and Laserdisc in 1993.

The film has been released on DVD, and also two Blu-ray box sets with both of its predecessors. Some home media releases label the film as Teenage Mutant Ninja Turtles III: Turtles in Time on their front cover.

In December 2025, Arrow Video released the film on both 4K Ultra HD Blu-ray and Blu-ray formats, along with its predecessors, in the United Kingdom, the United States and Canada.
