= Move That Body (Technotronic song) =

Single by Technotronic

from the album Body to Body
- B-side: Remix + "Getting Started"
- Released: 1991
- Genre: House
- Length: 3:55
- Label: ARS Productions (UK, Benelux, Netherland); Mega Records (Germany)
- Songwriters: Rejane Magloire; Thomas de Quincey; Jo Bogaert
- Producers: Thomas de Quincey; Jo Bogaert

Technotronic singles chronology
"Turn It Up" (1990)	"Move That Body" (1991)	"Work" (1991)

Music video
- "Move That Body" on YouTube

"Move That Body" is a song by Belgian dance act Technotronic, released in 1991 as the first single from their second studio album, Body to Body (1991). Vocals are performed by Congolese–American singer, model, and actress Réjane Magloire, credited as Reggie. She also co-wrote the lyrics with producers Thomas de Quincey and Jo Bogaert. The single achieved some success throughout Europe, particularly in Denmark, Finland, Ireland, Luxembourg and Switzerland where it was a top-10 hit. In the UK, it peaked at numbers 12 and 13 on the UK Singles Chart and the Music Week Dance Singles chart.

== Critical reception ==
Pan-European magazine Music & Media wrote, "Pumping up the jam again. Demanding dance beats from the Belgian specialists, ready for EHR." James Hamilton from Music Week described the song as a "girl rapped pop canterer". In Record Mirror, he added, "Jo Bogaert new girl Reggi — or Rejana, as she calls herself now — Magloire, once a member of Indeep (but NOT on 'Last Night a DJ Saved My Life', that was Rose Marie Ramsey), raps and chants this 'Hokey Cokey' quoting brisky lurching pop canterer".

== Track listings ==
These are the major formats and track listing for the releases of "Move That Body":

- 7" single
1. "Move That Body" — 3:55
2. "Move That Body" (instrumental) — 3:30
- 12" maxi
1. "Move That Body" (12" version) — 4:27
2. "Move That Body" (12" instrumental) — 3:46
3. "Getting Started" (instrumental) — 5:40
- CD maxi
1. "Move That Body" (7" version) — 3:55
2. "Move That Body" (12" version) — 4:27
3. "Move That Body" (12" instrumental) — 3:46
4. "Getting Started" (instrumental) — 5:40
- Cassette (double length)
1. "Move That Body" — 3:55
2. "Move That Body" (instrumental) — 5:40
3. "Move That Body" (12" version) — 4:27

== Charts ==
=== Weekly charts ===
Chart (1991)	Peak position
Australia (ARIA)	27
Belgium (Ultratop 50 Flanders)	18
Belgium (VRT Top 30 Flanders)	20
Denmark (IFPI)	9
Finland (Suomen virallinen lista)	8
France (SNEP)	25
Germany (Official German Charts)	19
Greece (IFPI)	5
Ireland (IRMA)	3
Israel (Israeli Singles Chart)	22
Luxembourg (Radio Luxembourg)	8
Netherlands (Dutch Top 40)	32
Netherlands (Mega Top 100)	38
Portugal (AFP)	5
Spain (AFYVE)	14
Sweden (Sverigetopplistan)	33
Switzerland (Schweizer Hitparade)	10
UK Singles (OCC)	12
UK Airplay (Music Week)	24
UK Dance (Music Week)	13
UK Club Chart (Record Mirror)	61

=== Year-end charts ===
Chart (1991)	Position
Europe (European Hot 100 Singles)	83
