= Move That Body =

Move That Body may refer to:

- "Move That Body" (Technotronic song)
- "Move That Body" (Nelly song)
