= Spin That Wheel =

Single by Hi Tek 3 featuring Ya Kid K

from the album Teenage Mutant Ninja Turtles: The Original Motion Picture Soundtrack
- Released: February 26, 1990
- Genre: Hip house
- Length: 3:41
- Label: Brothers Organisation; SBK Records; Dance Pool; ARS Productions
- Songwriters: Kovali; El Sati; Ya Kid K
- Producers: Hi Tek 3; Jo Bogaert

Technotronic singles chronology
"This Beat Is Technotronic" (1990)	"Spin That Wheel" (1990)	"Rockin' Over the Beat" (1990)

Music video
- "Spin That Wheel" on YouTube

"Spin That Wheel" is a song by Hi Tek 3 in collaboration with Belgian group Technotronic members Ya Kid K and Jo Bogaert. It was released under the name "Hi Tek 3 featuring Ya Kid K" in 1990. Hi Tek 3 are listed as Kovali, El Sati and Yosef. The track appeared on the Teenage Mutant Ninja Turtles soundtrack (1990) and was also released as a single in February 1990. In some territories it was released as "Spin That Wheel (Turtles Get Real)". References to drug use ("I smoke the mic like weed" and "This hypes you up like speed") were edited out of the soundtrack album. A David Morales remix of the track was also included on the Technotronic album Trip on This: The Remixes (1990).

In the UK, "Spin That Wheel" was first issued in January 1990 and reached number 69, but became a bigger hit when re-released that September, peaking at number 15. In the US, the song reached numbers 62 and 69 on the US Cash Box Top 100 and Billboard Hot 100 charts. It also reached numbers eight, three and 39 on the Billboard Hot Dance Music/Maxi-Singles Sales, Hot Dance Club Play and Hot R&B/Hip-Hop Songs charts.

== Critical reception ==
Bill Coleman from Billboard magazine commented, "From the Technotronic stable comes the jammin' club offering 'Spin That Wheel' by Hi Tek 3 featuring Technotronic's Ya Kid K on lead vocal. The energy that this track emanates is amazing and can't help but heat up a dancefloor. It's mixed by Jo Bogaert; we prefer the "Swing That Beat" version and "bass-a-pella" to those mixes sporting the weathered "whoa yeah" hook. Don't miss ... "

== Selected track listings ==
- UK 7"
1. "Spin That Wheel (Radio Version)"
2. "Spin That Wheel (Dub Edit)"
- UK 12" and CD
1. "Spin That Wheel (First Feel Mix)"
2. "Spin That Wheel (Radio Version)"
3. "Spin That Wheel (Dub Mix)"
- UK 12" maxi-single
1. "Spin That Wheel (Extended Flick Mix)"
2. "Spin That Wheel (Dub Mix)" 6:15
3. "Spin That Wheel (Flick Mix)"
4. "Spin That Wheel (Spin That Body Mix)"
5. "Spin That Wheel (Swing That Beat Mix)" 6:09
6. "Spin That Wheel (Bass-Apella Mix)" 5:56

== Charts ==
=== Weekly charts ===
Chart (1990–1991)	Peak position
Australia (ARIA)	5
Belgium (Ultratop 50 Flanders)	21
Canada Dance/Urban (RPM)	2
Europe (Eurochart Hot 100)	46
Ireland (IRMA)	21
Israel (Israeli Singles Chart)	13
Luxembourg (Radio Luxembourg)	9
Netherlands (Dutch Top 40)	29
Netherlands (Single Top 100)	24
New Zealand (Recorded Music NZ)	10
UK Singles (OCC)	15
US Billboard Hot 100	69
US Hot Dance Club Play	3
US Hot Dance Music/Maxi-Singles Sales	8
US Hot R&B/Hip-Hop Songs	39
US Cash Box Top 100	62

=== Year-end charts ===
Chart (1990)	Position
New Zealand (Recorded Music NZ)	42
