= Pump Up the Jam (album) =

- Standard international artwork, also used for US digital reissues

Studio album by Technotronic
- Released: 28 November 1989
- Labels: ARS; SBK/EMI Records (US); Swanyard
- Producer: Thomas de Quincey

Technotronic chronology
Pump Up the Jam (1989)	Trip on This: The Remixes (1990)

Singles from Pump Up the Jam
- 1. "Pump Up the Jam" Released: 18 August 1989; 2. "Get Up! (Before the Night Is Over)" Released: 22 January 1990; 3. "This Beat Is Technotronic" Released: 15 February 1990; 4. "Rockin' Over the Beat" Released: 20 April 1990; 5. "Move This" Released: 1992 (USA)

Pump Up the Jam (also known as Pump Up the Jam: The Album in North America) is the debut studio album by Belgian dance act Technotronic. It was released on 28 November 1989. The initial album cover and early promotional videos featured a model named Felly, who lip-synched vocals performed by Belgian emcee Ya Kid K. When this was discovered, further videos featured Ya Kid K instead. The album reached number two on the UK Albums Chart.

Following the success of the "Move This" single in the US, the album was reissued in 1992 with Ya Kid K on the cover, billed as Technotronic featuring Ya Kid K, with Felly's name removed from the credits in the booklet.

== Critical reception ==
Professional ratings
Review scores
Source	Rating
AllMusic	4.5/5 stars
Robert Christgau	A−
Orlando Sentinel	3/5 stars

The Orange County Register stated that Technotronic "have fashioned a lightweight yet crafty dance record which steals from such Americans as house builder Todd Terry, German electro-gods Kraftwerk, and fellow Belgian dancefloor dilettantes Telex."

== Track listing ==
All tracks written by Jo Bogaert, with additional writers noted.

No.	Title	Writer(s)	Length
1.	"Pump Up the Jam"	Manuela Kamosi	5:03/5:20
2.	"Get Up! (Before the Night Is Over)"	Kamosi	4:51/5:37
3.	"Tough"	Eric Martin	4:12/4:25
4.	"Take It Slow"	Kamosi	5:05
5.	"Come On"		3:09
6.	"This Beat Is Technotronic"	Martin	5:26
7.	"Move This"	Kamosi	5:02/5:19
8.	"Come Back"		4:09/4:52
9.	"Rockin' Over the Beat"	Kamosi	5:17/5:46
10.	"Raw"		3:14/4:47
11.	"Wave"		4:17
12.	"String"		2:54

Notes

- Tracks 11 and 12 are CD bonus tracks. Track 12 is titled "Bluestring" on U.S. and Canadian CD release. Tracks 1–3 and 7–10 are longer versions on CD.

== Personnel ==
- Manuela "Ya Kid K" Kamosi – vocals
- Eric "MC Eric" Martin – vocals
- Patrick de Meyer, Yannic Fonderie – keyboards
- DJ Seik – turntable scratching on "Get Up!" "Tough," "Take It Slow," and "Raw"
- Jo “Thomas de Quincey” Bogaert – all other instruments and programming

Production

- Produced by Jo Bogaert for ARS Entertainment Belgium
- Engineered by Spencer Henderson at Swanyard Studios, London, UK

== Charts ==
=== Weekly charts ===
Chart (1989–1990)	Peak position
Australian Albums (ARIA)	22
Austrian Albums (Ö3 Austria)	3
Canada Top Albums/CDs (RPM)	7
Dutch Albums (Album Top 100)	16
Finnish Albums (Suomen virallinen lista)	2
French Albums (SNEP)	16
German Albums (Offizielle Top 100)	10
New Zealand Albums (RMNZ)	18
Portuguese Albums (AFP)	1
Swedish Albums (Sverigetopplistan)	17
Swiss Albums (Schweizer Hitparade)	4
UK Albums (Official Charts)	2
US Billboard 200	10
US Top R&B/Hip-Hop Albums (Billboard)	23

=== Year-end charts ===
Chart (1990)	Position
Austrian Albums (Ö3 Austria)	19
Canada Top Albums/CDs (RPM)	27
Dutch Albums (Album Top 100)	50
German Albums (Offizielle Top 100)	43
Swiss Albums (Schweizer Hitparade)	20
US Billboard 200	33
US Top R&B/Hip-Hop Albums (Billboard)	73

== Certifications ==
Region	Certification	Certified units/sales
Brazil (Pro-Música Brasil)	Gold	100,000^{*}
Canada (Music Canada)	4× Platinum	400,000^{^}
France (SNEP)	Gold	100,000^{*}
Netherlands (NVPI)	Gold	50,000^{^}
United Kingdom (BPI)	Platinum	300,000^{^}
United States (RIAA)	Platinum	1,000,000^{^}
^{*} Sales figures based on certification alone.^{^} Shipments figures based on certification alone.
