= Rockin' Over the Beat =

Single by Technotronic

from the album Pump Up the Jam
- Released: 20 April 1990
- Genre: Eurodance
- Length: 4:08
- Label: Swanyard Records (UK); On the Beat (France); Musart (Mexico)
- Songwriters: Manuela Kamosi; Jo Bogaert
- Producer: Jo Bogaert

Technotronic singles chronology
"Spin That Wheel" (1990)	"Rockin' Over the Beat" (1990)	"Megamix" (1990)

Music video
- "Rockin' Over the Beat (Rockin' Over Manchester Remix)" on YouTube

Music video
- "Rockin' Over the Beat (LP Edit)" on YouTube

"Rockin' Over the Beat" is a song by Belgian dance act Technotronic. It was released in April 1990 as the fourth and final single from the act's debut studio album, Pump Up the Jam. It is accredited to "Technotronic featuring Ya Kid K", who co-wrote the track with Jo Bogaert (aka Thomas De Quincey).

The song is an upbeat house tune espousing the pleasures of dancing. It is representative of the positive and melodic feel of the Pump Up the Jam album. "Rockin' Over the Beat" was a respectable hit for Technotronic; it reached number five in Luxembourg, number nine in the UK, number eleven in Ireland and breached the US Billboard Hot 100 at number 95.

== Releases ==
The single was released on vinyl and Compact Disc. In the UK the 7" edition comprised an edit of the LP version together with an album track, "Raw". In Belgium the "Rockin' Over Manchester 7" Remix" by Bernard Sumner of New Order was the A-side, again with "Raw" as the B-side, while in France the Sumner mix appeared as the B-side with a single edit as the first track.

Most 12" releases featured three remixes by Bernard Sumner: the "Piccadilly", "Hacienda" and "Instrumental" mixes, all of which were prefixed with "Rockin' Over Manchester" (where Sumner is from), with the album version included as the first track in France and Britain. The Haçienda remix appears on the Teenage Mutant Ninja Turtles III soundtrack.

A European CD maxi-single collected the edited and full LP versions together with the "7" Remix" and "Dub Version" mixes by Sumner.

== Critical reception ==
Larry Flick from Billboard magazine commented, "While so many acts scramble to recreate the unique hip-house sound of Technotronic's debut album, Belgian act returns with a smoother, almost ambient house cut, boasting a tuneful performance from Ya Kid K." David Giles from Music Week stated that the fourth track from the LP is "still worthy as it coincides with the act's dates at Wembley as support to Madonna later in the month. That exposure can only ensure another hit." Gene Sandbloom from The Network Forty wrote that "the heavy house sounds you've come to know from this Belgian dance phenomenon take a back seat to former model Felly's vocals this time out. The results are the first single with actually more radio than dance floor appeal from this group that brought a whole new wave to the clubs a year ago. Expressing her words through her trademark blue lipstick, Felly's attitude filled vocals float over this African/New York beat, and the song becomes more hypnotic with each listen." William Shaw from Smash Hits complimented Ya Kid K's "brilliant rap voice", adding that she is "on form here, piping out another bubbly rap about rolling under the mel-o-dee, and rockin' under the beat, but she does it swingingly."

== Music videos ==
At least two music videos were made for the song. The UK video, which used the LP edit over black-and-white footage of people dancing, with brightly coloured words and animations superimposed. The US video, which used the "Rockin' Over Manchester 7" Remix" was a more contemporary film with dancers in front of a white background and slowed-down clips from the "Pump Up the Jam" (live version) and "Get Up" videos.

== Track listing ==
12 inch vinyl (Swanyard Records – SYRT14, UK)

1. "Rockin' Over the Beat (LP Version)" - 5:17
2. "This Beat Is Technotronic (Swanyard Remix)" - 5:51
  - Track 2 remixed by Jean-Paul "Bluey" Maunick and Spencer Henderson.

12 inch vinyl - The Bernard Sumner "Rockin' Over Manchester" Remixes (Swanyard Records – SYRTR14, UK)

1. "Rockin' Over the Beat (Rockin' Over Manchester Hacienda Mix)" - 7:05
2. "Rockin' Over the Beat (Rockin' Over Manchester Piccadilly Mix)" - 6:29
3. "Rockin' Over the Beat (Rockin' Over Manchester Instrumental Mix)" - 5:55
  - All tracks remixed by Bernard Sumner.

7 inch vinyl (Swanyard Records – SYR14, UK)

1. "Rockin' Over the Beat (LP Edit)" - 3:36
2. "Raw" - 3:10

CD (Swanyard Records – CDSYR14, UK)

1. "Rockin' Over the Beat (LP Edit)" - 3:47
2. "Rockin' Over the Beat (LP Version)" - 5:17
3. "Rockin' Over the Beat (Rockin' Over Manchester 7" Remix)" - 3:49
4. "Rockin' Over the Beat (Rockin' Over Manchester Dub Version)" - 5:29
  - Tracks 3 and 4 remixed by Bernard Sumner.

Cassette (Swanyard Records Ltd – CASYR14, UK)

1. "Rockin' Over the Beat (LP Edit)" - 3:36
2. "Raw" - 3:10

== Charts ==
Chart performance for "Rockin' Over the Beat"
Chart (1990–1991)	Peak position
Australia (ARIA)	53
Belgium (Ultratop 50 Flanders)	16
Europe (Eurochart Hot 100)	26
France (SNEP)	20
Germany (GfK)	18
Ireland (IRMA)	11
Israel (Israeli Singles Chart)	11
Luxembourg (Radio Luxembourg)	5
Switzerland (Schweizer Hitparade)	10
UK Singles (OCC)	9
UK Dance (Music Week)	9
US Billboard Hot 100	95
US Radio Songs (Billboard)	61
