= This Beat Is Technotronic =

Single by Technotronic

from the album Pump Up the Jam: The Album
- Released: 15 February 1990
- Genre: Tribal house
- Length: 5:26
- Label: ARS
- Songwriters: Eric Martin; Jo Bogaert
- Producer: Jo Bogaert

Technotronic singles chronology
"Get Up! (Before the Night Is Over)" (1990)	"This Beat Is Technotronic" (1990)	"Spin That Wheel" (1990)

Music video
- "This Beat Is Technotronic" on YouTube

"This Beat Is Technotronic" is a song by Belgian dance music group Technotronic, released by label ARS as the third single from their debut album, Pump Up the Jam: The Album (1989). Featuring MC Eric on vocals, who also co-wrote the lyrics with producer Jo Bogaert, the single found its greatest success on the Billboard Hot Dance Music/Club Play chart in the United States, where it hit number three. It also peaked at number 14 in the United Kingdom. It is the follow-up to Technotronic's second single, "Get Up! (Before the Night Is Over)".

== Critical reception ==
Upon the release, Bill Coleman from Billboard magazine stated that "you know the beat, now catch the groove. Rack up another smash for the Belgian hip-house ensemble." He added, "Ya Kid K takes a rest so MC Eric can drop a little science accompanied by Chanelle and Karen Bernod (of Tribal House) on these new mixes." Harry Sumrall from Knight Ridder noted that it has the "cybernetic feel of Kraftwerk". Dave Jennings from Melody Maker wrote, "He'll never replace ol' blue lips this way. The sound's exactly the same as on the previous two hits, but Eric's flat rap scarcely lives up to the intriguing homoerotic packaging. This beat is over-familiar." Diana Valois from The Morning Call called it "a faceful of rap bravado".

David Giles from Music Week wrote, "This could be the one that misses out. The absence of instant hooklines, and Big One Record's version of the same track released simultaneously may be to blame. Perhaps they will both be hits." Gene Sandbloom from The Network Forty felt the follow-up to "Pump Up the Jam" "defines their unique keyboard blend", adding that it is "a bit more tribal and perhaps more Devoesque than its predecessor". Terry Staunton from NME commented, "Disappointing after the delight of the earlier record with Ya Kid K rapping her backside off. [...] Still, we'll find it grows on us as it blares out of the "bins" at various clubs. Not bad, but can do better."

=== Retrospective response ===
Retrospectively AllMusic editor Alex Henderson described "This Beat Is Technotronic" as "highly infectious". In a 2015 review, Pop Rescue stated that it "sees MC Eric 'take the microphone stand' and using his 'dope lyrics'", noting that the song is "pretty much a repetitive rap over the familiar bassy synth and hissing hi-hat sequence."

== Chart performance ==
"This Beat Is Technotronic" was a major hit on the charts on several continents. In Europe, it made it to the top 10 in Belgium, Finland, Ireland, West Germany, the Netherlands and Switzerland with its best chart position as number five in both Finland and Ireland. Additionally, the single was a top-20 hit in France, Spain and the UK. In the latter, it peaked at number 14 in its third week at the UK Singles Chart, on 15 April 1990. In Italy, "This Beat Is Technotronic" was a top-30 hit, peaking at number 27.

Outside Europe, the single reached number three on the Billboard Hot Dance Club Play chart in the US, number four in Israel, number seven on the RPM Dance/Urban chart in Canada, number 27 in Australia and number 38 in New Zealand.

== Track listings ==
- 7-inch single
1. "This Beat Is Technotronic" (single version) – 3:40
2. "This Beat Is Technotronic" (Rap to Beats) – 3:15
- 12-inch maxi
1. "This Beat Is Technotronic" ("My Favourite Club" mix) – 5:57
2. "This Beat Is Technotronic" (instrumental) – 4:00
3. "This Beat Is Technotronic" (Alaska dub) – 5:00
4. "This Beat Is Technotronic" (Rap to Beats) – 2:00
- 12-inch maxi
1. "This Beat Is Technotronic" (Get on It club mix) – 7:40
2. "This Beat Is Technotronic" (radio edit) – 4:50
3. "This Beat Is Technotronic" (7-inch mix) – 3:30
4. "This Beat Is Technotronic" (This Dub is Technotronic) – 5:44
5. "Pump Up the Jam" (Punami mix) – 6:19
6. "Tough" – 4:23
- CD single
1. "This Beat Is Technotronic" ("My Favourite Club" mix) – 5:57
2. "This Beat Is Technotronic" (single version) – 3:40
3. "This Beat Is Technotronic" (Alaska dub) – 5:00
4. "This Beat Is Technotronic" (Rap to Beats) – 3:15
5. "This Beat Is Technotronic" (Beats & Bass) – 2:00
- CD maxi
1. "This Beat Is Technotronic" (single version) – 3:40
2. "This Beat Is Technotronic" ("My Favourite Club" mix) – 5:57
3. "This Beat Is Technotronic" (Alaska dub) – 5:00
4. "This Beat Is Technotronic" (Rap to Beats) – 3:15
5. "This Beat Is Technotronic" (Beats & Bass) – 2:00
- Cassette
1. "This Beat Is Technotronic" (7-inch mix)
2. "This Beat Is Technotronic" (Get on It 7-inch mix)
3. "Pump Up The Jam" — (Punami mix)
4. "This Beat Is Technotronic" (7-inch mix)
5. "This Beat Is Technotronic" (Get on It 7-inch mix)
6. "Pump Up The Jam" – (Punami mix)
- 12-inch and CD maxi – Remixes
1. "This Beat Is Technotronic" (Get on It club mix) – 7:40
2. "This Beat Is Technotronic" (Get on It single mix) – 3:34
3. "This Beat Is Technotronic" (radio edit) – 4:50
4. "This Dub Is Technotronic" – 5:44

== Personnel ==
- Vocals by MC Eric
- Produced by Jo Bogaert
- Artwork by Patrick F Cypen
- Photography by Koen Kampioen

== Charts ==
=== Weekly charts ===
Technotronic version

Chart (1990)	Peak position
Australia (ARIA)	27
Belgium (Ultratop 50 Flanders)	7
Canada Dance/Urban (RPM)	7
Europe (Eurochart Hot 100)	11
Finland (Suomen virallinen lista)	5
France (SNEP)	18
Ireland (IRMA)	5
Israel (Israeli Singles Chart)	4
Luxembourg (Radio Luxembourg)	8
Netherlands (Dutch Top 40)	7
Netherlands (Single Top 100)	7
New Zealand (Recorded Music NZ)	38
Spain (AFYVE)	11
Switzerland (Schweizer Hitparade)	8
UK Singles (Official Charts)	14
UK Dance (Music Week)	7
US Dance Club Play (Billboard)	3
West Germany (GfK)	10

MC B. featuring Daisy Dee version

Chart (1990)	Peak position
Austria (Ö3 Austria Top 40)	11
Europe (Eurochart Hot 100)	56
Netherlands (Dutch Top 40)	22
Netherlands (Single Top 100)	18
West Germany (GfK)	14

=== Year-end charts ===
Chart (1990)	Position
Belgium (Ultratop 50 Flanders)	82
Europe (Eurochart Hot 100)	80
Germany (Media Control)	99
Netherlands (Dutch Top 40)	100
Netherlands (Single Top 100)	58
