= Body to Body (Technotronic album) =

Studio album by Technotronic
- Released: 1991
- Label: ARS/SME Records
- Producer: Jo Bogaert

Technotronic chronology
Trip on This: The Remixes (1990)	Body to Body (1991)	The Greatest Hits (1993)

Body to Body is the second studio album by Belgian dance act Technotronic, released in 1991. It includes the singles "Move That Body" and "Work", both featuring singer Reggie.

== Track listing ==
No.	Title	Writer(s)	Length
1.	"Move That Body"	Jo Bogaert; Réjane Magloire	3:54
2.	"Work"	Bogaert; Magloire; Patrick De Meyer	3:43
3.	"Release Yourself"	Bogaert; Magloire; De Meyer	3:40
4.	"Cold Chillin'"	Bogaert; De Meyer; Lucien Foort; Oliver Abbeloos	3:27
5.	"Voices"	Bogaert	3:16
6.	"Money Makes the World Go Round"	Bogaert; Magloire	4:10
7.	"Gimmie the One"	Bogaert; Magloire; De Meyer	3:46
8.	"Yeh-Yeah"	Bogaert	3:19
9.	"Body to Body"	Bogaert; Foort; Abbeloos	4:16
10.	"Get It Started"	Bogaert; Magloire	4:06
11.	"Bogaert's Breakfast"	Bogaert	4:56

== Personnel ==
- Jo Bogaert – producer
- Michel Dierickx – engineer, mixing
- Réjane "Reggie" Magloire – vocals on tracks 1–3, 6, 7 and 10
- Riv – vocals on track 9, co-vocals on track 4
- Colt 45 – rap on tracks 4 and 9

== Charts ==
Chart performance for Body to Body
Chart (1991)	Peak position
Australian Albums (ARIA)	86
Austrian Albums (Ö3 Austria)	25
Finnish Albums (Suomen virallinen lista)	32
French Albums (SNEP)	39
German Albums (Offizielle Top 100)	42
Portuguese Albums (AFP)	5
Swiss Albums (Schweizer Hitparade)	17
UK Albums (OCC)	27
