= Réjane Magloire =

Congolese–American singer, model, and actress (1964–2023)

- Born: November 28, 1964; Zaire
- Died: October 2023 (aged 58)
- Occupations: Opera singer, Television actor

Réjane Magloire known later professionally as Reggie Magloire (28 November 1964 – October 2023) was a Congolese–American singer, model, and actress.

== Early life and acting career ==
Réjane Magloire was born on November 28, 1964, in Likasi, Zaïre (now known as the Democratic Republic of the Congo), but grew up in New York City, United States. She studied Western classical music with heavy emphasis on opera singing. Both her parents are Haitian.

As an actress, Magloire had early exposure on television in commercials and went on to play Samantha, a member of the Short Circus, on the TV series The Electric Company from 1975 to the end of production in 1977 (she replaced Melanie Henderson). PBS stations continued airing reruns of The Electric Company through 1985.

She was also featured in Wilma, a 1977 made for TV biopic about Wilma Rudolph, as the young athlete, opposite Denzel Washington, in his very first film appearance.

== Musical career ==
Magloire was a member of the 1980s band, Indeep, which scored a charting success with their debut single, “Last Night a D.J. Saved My Life”, for which she was one of the two lead singers. Mariah Carey later covered that single.

She was a member of the Technotronic from 1991, both as a singer and producer, which was best known for its dance singles. Technotronic released its second studio album Body to Body, which featured as their new main vocalist Reggie (Magloire under her new stage name). Reggie provided vocals for six tracks on the album. Body to Body was a top 40 hit album in three countries: Austria (Ö3 Austria), Switzerland (Schweizer Hitparade), and the United Kingdom (UK Albums OCC), where it peaked at 27 and charted for four weeks. The lead single from that LP, “Move That Body,” was sung by Magloire (as Reggie), and became a top 10 hit in several European countries, including Denmark, Finland, Ireland, and Switzerland, but not the United States. Nonetheless, her singing was lauded by James Hamilton from the British Music Week, who described the track as a "girl rapped pop canterer".

== Death ==
In March 2024, it was revealed that Magloire had died of a heart attack in October 2023 in Cambodia.
