= Ya Kid K =

Belgian hip hop artist (born 1971)

- Born: Manuela Barbara Kamosi Moaso Djogi; 27 January 1972 (age 54); Kinshasa, Zaïre
- Spouse: Eric Martin
- Children: 1
- Musical career
- Genres: Hip hop, electronic, house, hip house, Eurodance
- Occupations: Rapper, singer, songwriter
- Formerly of: Technotronic

Manuela Barbara Kamosi Moaso Djogi (born 27 January 1972), known as Ya Kid K, is a Congolese-born Belgian rapper, singer, and songwriter. She is best known as the lead vocalist for the Eurodance group Technotronic.

== Early life ==
Djogi was born in Kinshasa in 1972, the daughter of a Congolese father and Belgian mother. Her sister is singer and TV personality Karoline "Leki" Kamosi.

Her family moved to Belgium when she was 11 years old. She spent her teenage years in the United States, first in Chicago where she was introduced to hip-hop and the emerging sounds of house music, and then to Dallas.

== Music career ==
After moving back to Belgium from the US, Ya Kid K helped form a hip hop label called Fresh Beat Productions. She was part of the dance project Technotronic, which debuted with a major worldwide hit in 1989, "Pump Up the Jam". Although she did not appear in the video, she was finally credited as vocalist on the track on the US reissue of the group's debut album.

Although Ya Kid K wrote the lyrics and sang vocals on "Pump Up the Jam", Technotronic had the fashion model Felly Kilingi perform in the video, without Ya Kid K's consent. The second single "Get Up! (Before the Night Is Over)" was Ya Kid K's debut music video with Technotronic. In 1992, Technotronic and Ya Kid K had a hit with "Move This," another single from 1989's Pump Up the Jam: The Album.

She also lent her voice to Hi Tek 3, a dance project whose only single, "Spin That Wheel", appeared on the Teenage Mutant Ninja Turtles motion picture soundtrack.

While Jo Bogaert hired new singers for Technotronic's third album, Body to Body, Ya Kid K returned after limited success of her own album, One World Nation. This album contained many different musical and, in particular, vocal styles.

In 1991, Ya Kid K appeared on the Teenage Mutant Ninja Turtles II: The Secret of the Ooze: The Original Motion Picture Soundtrack, performing "Awesome (You Are My Hero)", continuing her work with the music of the film franchise. The partnership continued in 1993, when two versions of Ya Kid K's "Rockin' Over the Beat" appeared on the Teenage Mutant Ninja Turtles III: Original Motion Picture Soundtrack.

In 1995, Technotronic re-emerged in the U.S. with Ya Kid K as its front vocalist, again with limited success for the album, Recall. On the track "Are You Ready" she teamed up with Daisy Dee, who had already done a cover version of "This Beat Is…" with MC B. In 1996, a Ya Kid K single titled "Rock My World" was released. She appeared in June 2000 on Technotronic's single "The Mariachi". In 2002, she released Take a Trip on Semini Records.

== Personal life ==
After the single "Rockin' Over the Beat", Ya Kid K married Welsh musician Eric "MC Eric" Martin, who performed on the Technotronic hit "This Beat Is Technotronic". The couple has a child.

== Discography ==
- 1992: One World Nation (The Kids Shall Overcome) SBK/EMI
- 2014: Stalled Constructions (digital download)

=== Charted singles ===
List of charted singles, with selected chart positions
Title	Year	Chart positions
Title	Year	AUS
"Awesome"	1991	111
"Let This Housebeat Drop"	1993	125
