= JT and the Big Family =

Italian musical group

JT and the Big Family was an early 1990s musical group from Italy.

Their biggest hit single and trademark song is "Moments in Soul", which reached No. 7 on the UK Singles Chart in March 1990. The song samples Art of Noise's "Moments in Love" and Soul II Soul's "Back to Life". A second single, a cover of the Mike Oldfield hit "Foreign Affair", reached No. 90 in the UK.
