= Piccadilly (disambiguation) =

Piccadilly is a road in London, England.

Piccadilly may also refer to:

== Arts and entertainment ==
Cinemas and theatres

- Piccadilly Cinema, Birmingham, in Sparkhill, Birmingham, England
- Piccadilly Cinema, Adelaide, in North Adelaide, South Australia
- Piccadilly Theatre, in London's West End
- Piccadilly Theatre (Beirut), a former theatre in Lebanon
- Piccadilly Theatre and Arcade, in Perth, Western Australia

Music

- Piccadilly, subsidiary of Pye Records, a British record label
- Piccadilly, a song on the album East Side Story by Squeeze
- Le Piccadilly, a 1904 musical composition by Erik Satie

Other

- Piccadilly (film), a British silent drama film made in 1929
- Piccadilly, a novel written in 1870 by Laurence Oliphant (1829–1888)
- Piccadilly Radio, former name of Greatest Hits Radio Manchester & The North West, a commercial radio station in Manchester, England

== Commerce ==
- Piccadilly (supermarket chain), a defunct Bulgarian supermarket chain
- Piccadilly Restaurants, an American cafeteria-style restaurant chain
- Piccadilly Press, an imprint of a British publishing house owned by Bonnier Zaffre

== Places ==
Antigua and Barbuda

- Piccadilly, Antigua and Barbuda, a settlement in Saint Paul

Australia

- Piccadilly, South Australia, a small town in the Adelaide Hills
- Piccadilly, Western Australia, a suburb of Kalgoorlie

Canada

- Piccadilly, a community in Central Frontenac, Ontario
- Piccadilly, a village in the local service district of Piccadilly Slant-Abraham's Cove, Newfoundland and Labrador

England

- Piccadilly, Manchester, a street in Manchester city centre
  - Piccadilly Gardens, a green space on Piccadilly, Manchester
  - Piccadilly (ward), an electoral ward of Manchester
- Piccadilly, Warwickshire, a small hamlet
- Piccadilly (York), a street in York

== Transport ==
- Piccadilly line, part of the London Underground network, London, England
  - Piccadilly Circus tube station, a London Underground station in Piccadilly Circus, London
- Manchester Piccadilly station, the principal railway station in Manchester, England

== See also ==
- Manchester Piccadilly Gardens bus station, a bus station in Manchester, England
- Peccadillo (disambiguation)
- Piccadill, a collar of cut-work lace popular in the late-16th to early-17th centuries
- Picadillo, a traditional dish in many Latin American countries
- Piccadilly Circus, a road junction and public space in London's West End
- Piccadilly Gardens (painting), a 1954 painting by L. S. Lowry
- Piccadilly Gardens tram stop, a tram stop in Manchester, England
