= Technotronic =

Belgian electronic music project

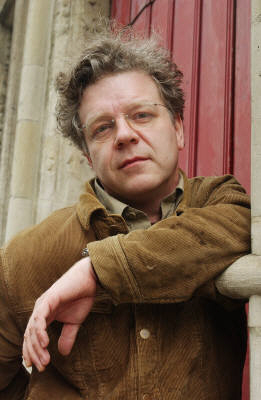
- Jo Bogaert, creator of Technotronic

Background information
- Origin: Aalst, Belgium
- Genres: Eurodance; hip house; new beat; tech house
- Years active: 1987–2001
- Labels: ARS Entertainment Belgium; SBK/EMI; Swanyard Records; Telstar Records; WorX
- Past members: Jo Bogaert; Manuela "Ya Kid K" Kamosi; Eric "MC Eric" Martin; Melissa Beckford; Colin "Einstein" Case; Réjane "Reggie" Magloire

Technotronic was a Belgian electronic music project formed in 1987 by Jo Bogaert and best known for their 1989 single, "Pump Up the Jam", which features vocals by Ya Kid K. The song peaked at No. 2 on the Billboard Hot 100 in the United States. Later that year, the single was followed by the album of the same name, which peaked at No. 10 on the Billboard 200. Technotronic achieved further success with the singles "Get Up! (Before the Night Is Over)" and "Move This". They went on to release the albums Body to Body (1991) and Recall (1995), and they have been inactive since 2001.

== History ==
=== 1987–1990: Formation and Pump Up the Jam ===
Technotronic was formed in 1987 by Belgian musician, songwriter, and record producer Jo Bogaert, who had gained popularity in Europe as a solo artist with various new beat projects, including Acts of Madmen and Nux Nemo. Congolese–Belgian rapper Ya Kid K joined Technotronic on vocals, Bogaert adopted the stage name Thomas De Quincey, and in September 1989, they released the single "Pump Up the Jam", though Ya Kid K was initially uncredited for her contributions to the song. A front for the act was put together (in a way similar to other Eurodance acts like Black Box and Milli Vanilli), utilizing Congolese-born fashion model Felly Kilingi, who was presented as the group's vocalist. She featured on the single's cover art, which was credited as "Technotronic featuring Felly", and she also appeared in the music video for the song. The track became a worldwide success, eventually reaching No. 2 on both the Billboard Hot 100 and the UK Singles Chart in late 1989 and early 1990.

Technotronic issued their debut studio album, Pump Up the Jam, in late 1989, which included vocals by Ya Kid K and MC Eric but still featured Kilingi on the cover. The record peaked at No. 10 on the Billboard 200 in the US and reached No. 2 on the UK Albums Chart. Following the release of the album, Ya Kid K was revealed to be the group's main vocalist, with Bogaert admitting that "[Felly] didn't have much to do with the record. Me, Eric and Ya Kid did it all. We needed Felly to help promote the group at first — to create this image". In January 1990, they issued their second single, "Get Up! (Before the Night Is Over)", which was a No. 7 hit in the US and a No. 2 hit in the UK. The music video featured both Ya Kid K and Kilingi. That year, Technotronic made appearances on Saturday Night Live, The Arsenio Hall Show, and It's Showtime at the Apollo. In February 1990, Ya Kid K and Bogaert collaborated with the group Hi Tek 3 and released the single "Spin That Wheel", credited as "Hi Tek 3 featuring Ya Kid K". Further singles from Pump Up the Jam included "This Beat Is Technotronic", with vocals by MC Eric, and "Rockin' Over the Beat". Technotronic was also an opening act on Madonna's Blond Ambition World Tour. Following the tour, Ya Kid K departed the group.

In September 1990, a megamix compiling Technotronic's previous hits was released as a single and peaked at No. 6 in the UK and No. 5 on the Eurochart Hot 100. This was the first single from the remix album Trip on This: The Remixes, released in late 1990, which included the new song "Turn It Up", featuring vocals by new group members Melissa Beckford and Colin "Einstein" Case. "Turn It Up" was not as successful as the group's prior releases, and Melissa and Einstein later left the group.

=== 1991–1994: Body to Body and The Greatest Hits ===
In 1991, Technotronic released their second studio album, Body to Body, which featured new main vocalist Réjane "Reggie" Magloire. Reggie provided vocals for six tracks on the album, which also featured singer Riv and rapper Colt 45 on two tracks. Several singles were released in Europe, the UK, and Australia, including "Move That Body", "Work", and "Money Makes the World Go Round".

In 1992, the song "Move This" from Pump Up the Jam became popular through its use in a Revlon television commercial. Ya Kid K rejoined the group, and the song was released as a single. In 1993, Technotronic issued The Greatest Hits, which included the new songs "Hey Yoh Here We Go" and "One + One", both featuring vocals by Ya Kid K.

=== 1995–2001: Recall and later releases ===
Continuing with Ya Kid K as frontwoman, Technotronic released the single "Move It to the Rhythm" in 1994. It was followed in 1995 by the album Recall and the further singles "Recall" and "I Want You by My Side", the latter of which features the singer Black Diamond. The album also included vocals by Daisy Dee, on two tracks.

In 1996, the group released the remix EP Pump Up the Jam – The '96 Sequel, followed in 1998 by the single "Get Up – The '98 Sequel", as well as the compilations This Beat Is Technotronic (Hits & Mixes) and Pump Up the Hits.

Technotronic returned in 1999 with the new singles "G-Train" and "Like This", featuring Monday Midnite on vocals. In 2000, Ya Kid K returned as the group's vocalist once more, releasing the non-album single "The Mariachi". In 2001, Technotronic released the standalone single "Runaway Blues".

== Discography ==
=== Studio albums ===
Title	Details	Peak chart positions									Certifications
Title	Details	AUS	AUT	GER	NED	NZ	SWE	SWI	UK	US	Certifications
Pump Up the Jam	Release date: 28 November 1989; Label: ARS Productions SBK/EMI (North America) Swanyard Records Ltd (UK); Formats: LP, CD, cassette	22	3	10	16	18	17	4	2	10	BPI: Platinum; MC: 4× Platinum; NVPI: Gold; RIAA: Platinum
Body to Body	Release date: 1991; Label: ARS Productions/Transistor Music; Formats: LP, CD, cassette	86	25	42	—	—	—	17	27	—	
Recall	Release date: 1995; Label: ARS Productions SBK/EMI (North America); Formats: CD, cassette	153	—	—	—	—	—	—	—	—	
"—" denotes releases that did not chart

=== Remix and compilation albums ===
Title	Details	Peak chart positions		Certifications
Title	Details	AUS	UK	Certifications
Trip on This: The Remixes	Release date: 18 September 1990; Label: ARS Productions SBK/EMI (North America)/Telstar Records (UK); Formats: LP, CD, cassette	50	7	BPI: Gold; MC: Gold
The Greatest Hits	Release date: 25 October 1993; Label: ARS Productions; Formats: CD	48	—	
This Beat Is Technotronic (Hits & Mixes)	Release date: 1997; Label: Music Club (United Kingdom); Formats: CD, Compact Cassette	—	—	
Pump Up the Hits	Release date: 1998; Label: Dance Street; Formats: CD, cassette	—	—	
Greatest Remix Hits	Release date: 2006; Label: Rajon Music Group [085-70560.2] (Australia); Formats: CD/DVD	—	—	
Best Of	Release date: 2011; Label: ARS Entertainment [2793193]; Formats: CD	—	—	
"—" denotes releases that did not chart

=== Singles ===
Year	Single	Peak chart positions										Certifications (sales thresholds)	Album
Year	Single	BEL (FL)	AUS	AUT	GER	IRE	NED	NZ	SWI	UK	US	Certifications (sales thresholds)	Album
1989	"Pump Up the Jam" (featuring Ya Kid K)	1	4	2	2	—	2	4	2	2	2	ARIA: Platinum; BPI: Platinum; NVPI: Gold; RIAA: Platinum	Pump Up the Jam – The Album
1990	"Get Up! (Before the Night Is Over)" (featuring Ya Kid K)	1	7	2	2	2	2	7	1	2	7	ARIA: Gold; BPI: Silver; RIAA: Gold; SNEP: Silver	Pump Up the Jam – The Album
1990	"This Beat Is Technotronic" (featuring MC Eric)	7	27	—	10	5	7	38	8	14	—		Pump Up the Jam – The Album
1990	"Rockin' Over the Beat" (featuring Ya Kid K)	16	53	—	18	11	—	—	10	9	95		Pump Up the Jam – The Album
1990	"Megamix"	8	13	—	9	4	18	—	7	6	—		Trip on This – The Remixes
1990	"Turn It Up" (featuring Melissa and Einstein)	39	87	—	—	26	—	—	—	42	—		Trip on This – The Remixes
1991	"Move That Body" (featuring Reggie)	18	27	—	19	3	38	—	10	12	—		Body to Body
1991	"Work" (featuring Reggie)	21	92	—	—	12	—	—	24	40	—		Body to Body
1991	"Money Makes the World Go Round" (featuring Reggie)	—	117	—	—	—	—	—	—	—	—		Body to Body
1992	"Move This" (featuring Ya Kid K)	—	67	—	—	—	—	—	—	—	6		The Greatest Hits
1993	"Hey Yoh, Here We Go" (featuring Ya Kid K)	48	102	—	—	—	—	—	—	120	—		The Greatest Hits
1994	"One + One" (featuring Ya Kid K)	—	—	—	—	—	—	—	—	—	—		The Greatest Hits
1994	"Move It to the Rhythm" (featuring Ya Kid K)	50	52	—	—	—	—	—	—	—	83		Recall
1995	"Recall" (featuring Ya Kid K)	—	123	—	—	—	—	—	—	—	—		Recall
1996	"I Want You by My Side"	31	—	—	—	—	—	—	—	—	—		Recall
1996	"Crazy"	—	—	—	—	—	—	—	—	—	—		non-album single
1996	"Pump Up the Jam – The '96 Sequel"	—	—	—	—	—	—	—	—	36	—		Pump Up the Hits
1998	"Get Up – The '98 Sequel"	42	—	—	91	—	—	—	—	—	—		Pump Up the Hits
1999	"Like This" (featuring Monday Midnite)	9	—	—	—	—	—	—	—	—	—		non-album singles
2000	"The G-Train" (featuring Monday Midnite)	39	—	—	—	—	—	—	—	—	—		non-album singles
2000	"The Mariachi" (featuring Ya Kid K)	27	—	—	—	—	—	—	—	—	—		non-album singles
2005	"Pump Up the Jam" (D.O.N.S. featuring Technotronic)	46	77	34	25	—	43	—	—	22	—		non-album singles
2007	"Get Up" (Global Deejays featuring Technotronic)	—	—	—	—	—	—	—	—	—	—		non-album singles
2022	"Otro Jam" (Kembo Music featuring Technotronic)	—	—	—	—	—	—	—	—	—	—		non-album singles
"—" denotes releases that did not chart or were not released

== See also ==
- List of number-one dance hits (United States)
- List of artists who reached number one on the US Dance chart
