= Get Up! (Before the Night Is Over) =

1990 single by Technotronic

Single by Technotronic

from the album Pump Up the Jam: The Album
- Released: 22 January 1990
- Genre: Eurodance; electronic; hip house
- Length: 5:37 (album version cold end); 4:51 (album version fade); 3:30 (single version)
- Label: ARS/Clip
- Songwriters: Manuella Kamosi; Jo Bogaert
- Producer: Thomas de Quincey

Technotronic singles chronology
| "Pump Up the Jam" (1989) | "Get Up! (Before the Night Is Over)" (1990) | "This Beat Is Technotronic" (1990) |

Music video
- "Get Up! (Before the Night Is Over)" on YouTube

"Get Up! (Before the Night Is Over)" is a song by Belgian musical group Technotronic featuring Ya Kid K. It was released in January 1990 as the second single from the band's debut album, Pump Up the Jam: The Album (1989), on which it features as the second track. It is written by Ya Kid K and Jo Bogaert, and produced by Thomas de Quincey. The single was successful in many countries, becoming a top-10 hit in Australia, Canada, Israel and the US and topping the chart of Belgium, Finland, Spain and Switzerland. The accompanying music video was directed by Liam Kan.

In 1998 and 1999, it was re-released respectively under the title "Get Up (the '98 Sequel)" and "Get Up (the 1999 Sequel)". The song appears in Dance Dance Revolution Ultramix 4 and Dance Dance Revolution 3rd Mix. It contains a vocal sample of James Brown's "Get Up, Get Into It, Get Involved". In 2007, the song was covered by Global Deejays (featuring Technotronic) who achieved a minor success in France.

== Chart performance ==
"Get Up! (Before the Night Is Over)" was a sizeable hit on the charts on several continents. It peaked at number-one in Belgium, Finland, Luxembourg, Spain and Switzerland, as well as on the Eurochart Hot 100. In addition, it reached number two in Austria, France, West Germany, Ireland, the Netherlands and the United Kingdom. In the latter, it peaked in its second week at the UK Singles Chart, on 4 February 1990. It was held off reaching the top spot by Sinéad O'Connor's "Nothing Compares 2 U". Outside Europe, the single reached number-one on the Canadian RPM Dance/Urban chart as well as in Zimbabwe. On the US Billboard Hot 100, "Get Up!" managed to reach number seven while on the Billboard Hot Dance Club Play chart, it peaked at number two. In both Australia and New Zealand, it went to number seven. In West Asia, it became a top-5 hit in Israel, peaking at number three on 18 March 1990.

The song was awarded with a gold record in the US, after 500,000 singles were sold, and a silver record in France and the UK, with a sale of 205,000 and 200,000 units.

== Critical reception ==
Upon the release, Bill Coleman from Billboard magazine felt the song is "not as catchy" as the group's breakthrough smash. Greg Kot of Chicago Tribune complimented rapper Ya Kid K's phrasing as "exotically enthusiastic and seductive", noting that catch phrases such as "Get up, get busy" "have become as ubiquitous as black leather miniskirts at dance clubs from Los Angeles to Berlin." Daily Mirror named it a "pounding" dance-floor track. Everett True from Melody Maker said, "This goes "git down/Mmm, get up-per" so many times you begin to wonder if the participants are involved in a particularly strenuous brand of press-up's." Pan-European magazine Music & Media commented, "Can they do it again? It certainly seems that way. This is less rap and more of an orthodox pop song. A strong chorus and one of the biggest bass sounds around. Excellent." John Leland from Newsday wrote that it "brings to the mainstream both cult sounds and cult ideology: It is more than anything a remix of the smash hit 'Pump Up the Jam', with a new rap by the enticingly vulgar-sounding Zairean rapper Ya Kid K. This is Donna Summer's 'I Feel Love' for the '90s: sinister, avant-garde, irresistible: a private fetish made public." Parry Gettelman from The Sentinel named it a "standout" dance track of the album. James Hamilton of Record Mirror complimented the song as "another powerfully-produced jam-pumping Euro-bounder, faultless of its type" in his weekly dance column. By contrast, Iestyn George of the same magazine considered the song as being "very much a variation on a theme" copying "the winning formula" of "Pump up the Jam"; he also noted the "fake Brooklyn accent" and Ya Kid K's "characterless", although predicting the song's success on the charts.

== Retrospective response ==
In a retrospective review, AllMusic editor Alex Henderson described the song as "highly infectious". Nicole Leedham from The Canberra Times remarked that "Get Up! (Before the Night Is Over)", along with "Pump Up the Jam", were pushing the envelope of dance music in the late '80s. In a 2015 review, Pop Rescue stated that the song "isn’t so dissimilar" to "Pump Up the Jam", "although plays more on the bass line, and gives Ya Kid K the vocalist credit that she works hard to earn – rapping, singing and writing the song."

== Music video ==
A music video was produced to promote the single, directed by Liam Kan. It features model Felly lipsynching the chorus with blue lipstick and De Quincey playing the keyboards in the background. The choreographer for the video was Ben Craft who made several other music video's with Liam Kan, including Pet Shop Boys, Crown Heights Affaire and Lindy Layton. As of June 2025, the video had generated more than 76 million views on YouTube.

== Track listings ==
=== Original version ===
- CD maxi
1. "Get Up! (Before the Night Is Over)" (dance action mix) — 6:00
2. "Get Up! (Before the Night Is Over)" (single mix) — 3:51
3. "Get Up! (Before the Night Is Over)" (muted mix) — 5:52
4. "Get Up! (Before the Night Is Over)" (CD version) — 5:54
- 7-inch single
1. "Get Up! (Before the Night Is Over)" (single mix) — 3:51
2. "Get Up! (Before the Night Is Over)" (instrumental) — 3:12
- 12-inch maxi
1. "Get Up! (Before The Night Is Over)" (dance action mix) — 6:00
2. "Get Up! (Before The Night Is Over)" (muted mix) — 5:52
3. "Get Up! (Before The Night Is Over)" (def mix) — 8:12
4. "Get Up! (Before The Night Is Over)" (a cappella) — 2:47
5. "Get Up! (Before The Night Is Over)" (instrumental) — 5:51
- US 12-inch maxi
1. "Get Up! (Before The Night Is Over)" (def mix) — 8:12
2. "Get Up! (Before The Night Is Over)" (album mix) — 4:47
3. "Get Up! (Before The Night Is Over)" (7" edit) — 3:30
4. "Get Up! (Before The Night Is Over)" (far east mix) — 5:58
5. "Pump Up The Jam" (techno mix) — 4:48
- US and Canadian 7-inch
1. "Get Up! (Before The Night Is Over)" (7" edit) — 3:30
2. "Raw" — 4:47
- Cassette single
1. "Get Up! (Before the Night Is Over)"
2. "Raw"

=== The '98 Sequel version ===
- CD maxi
1. "Get Up" (radio version) — 3:38
2. "Get Up" (radio sequel) — 3:42
3. "Get Up" (clubbing mix) — 5:49
4. "Get Up" (pulsar mix) — 5:15
5. "Pump up the Jam" (the sequel - dancing divaz master mix) — 5:35

=== 2007 version ===
- CD maxi
1. "Get Up (Before the Night Is Over)" (general electric version) — 6:22
2. "Get Up (Before the Night Is Over)" (flash brothers remix) — 7:39
3. "Get Up (Before the Night Is Over)" (tribalectric rap mix) — 6:05
4. "Get Up (Before The Night Is Over)" (Maurizio Gubellini Remix) 7:24
5. "Get Up (Before The Night Is Over)" (Global Deejays Remix)

== Charts ==
=== Weekly charts ===
==== Technotronic version ====
| Chart (1990) | Peak position |
|---|---|
| Australia (ARIA) | 7 |
| Austria (Ö3 Austria Top 40) | 2 |
| Belgium (Ultratop 50 Flanders) | 1 |
| Canada Top Singles (RPM) | 10 |
| Canada Dance/Urban (RPM) | 1 |
| Europe (Eurochart Hot 100) | 1 |
| Finland (Suomen virallinen lista) | 1 |
| France (SNEP) | 2 |
| Ireland (IRMA) | 2 |
| Israel (Israeli Singles Chart) | 3 |
| Italy (Musica e dischi) | 4 |
| Luxembourg (Radio Luxembourg) | 1 |
| Netherlands (Dutch Top 40) | 2 |
| Netherlands (Single Top 100) | 2 |
| New Zealand (Recorded Music NZ) | 7 |
| Norway (VG-lista) | 6 |
| Portugal (AFP) | 3 |
| Quebec (ADISQ) | 12 |
| Spain (AFYVE) | 1 |
| Sweden (Sverigetopplistan) | 4 |
| Switzerland (Schweizer Hitparade) | 1 |
| UK Singles (Official Charts) | 2 |
| US Billboard Hot 100 | 7 |
| US 12-inch Singles Sales (Billboard) | 1 |
| US Dance Club Play (Billboard) | 2 |
| US Hot Black Singles (Billboard) | 28 |
| US Cash Box Top 100 | 9 |
| West Germany (GfK) | 2 |
| Zimbabwe (ZIMA) | 1 |

| Chart (1998) | Peak position |
|---|---|
| Germany (GfK) "Get Up (the '98 Sequel)" | 91 |

| Chart (1999) | Peak position |
|---|---|
| France (SNEP) "Get Up (the 1999 Sequel) | 42 |

==== Global Deejays version ====
| Chart (2007) | Peak position |
|---|---|
| CIS Airplay (TopHit) | 29 |
| France (SNEP) | 32 |
| Russia Airplay (TopHit) | 59 |

=== Year-end charts ===
==== Technotronic version ====
| Chart (1990) | Position |
|---|---|
| Austria (Ö3 Austria Top 40) | 18 |
| Belgium (Ultratop) | 30 |
| Canada Dance/Urban (RPM) | 9 |
| Europe (Eurochart Hot 100) | 4 |
| Germany (Media Control) | 34 |
| Netherlands (Dutch Top 40) | 56 |
| Netherlands (Single Top 100) | 21 |
| Sweden (Topplistan) | 43 |
| Switzerland (Schweizer Hitparade) | 24 |
| UK Singles (OCC) | 17 |
| UK Club Chart (Record Mirror) | 43 |
| US Billboard Hot 100 | 73 |
| US 12-inch Singles Sales (Billboard) | 19 |
| US Dance Club Play (Billboard) | 9 |

==== Global Deejays version ====
| Chart (2007) | Position |
|---|---|
| CIS Airplay (TopHit) | 126 |
| Russia Airplay (TopHit) | 121 |

== Certifications ==
| Region | Certification | Certified units/sales |
|---|---|---|
| Australia (ARIA) | Gold | 35,000^{^} |
| France (SNEP) | Silver | 200,000^{*} |
| United Kingdom (BPI) | Silver | 200,000^{^} |
| United States (RIAA) | Gold | 500,000^{^} |
^{*} Sales figures based on certification alone.^{^} Shipments figures based on certification alone.
