= Pump Up the Jam =

1989 single by Technotronic

- Original 1989 single cover artwork featuring model Felly Kilingi

Single by Technotronic

from the album Pump Up the Jam
- Released: 18 August 1989
- Genre: House; Eurodance; new beat; hip house
- Length: 5:20
- Label: Swanyard; SBK; EMI (US)
- Songwriters: Manuela Kamosi; Thomas de Quincey; Farley "Jackmaster" Funk (uncredited)
- Producer: Thomas De Quincey

Technotronic singles chronology
"Pump Up the Jam" (1989)	"Get Up! (Before the Night Is Over)" (1990)

Music video
- "Pump Up the Jam" on YouTube

"Pump Up the Jam" is the debut single by the Belgian act Technotronic, released on 18 August 1989. It is the opening track on the 1989 debut album of the same name. The single was released by Swanyard and SBK Records and was a worldwide hit, reaching number 2 in the United Kingdom in late 1989 and on the US Billboard Hot 100 in early 1990. It also peaked at number 1 in Belgium, Finland, Iceland, Portugal and Spain. "Pump Up the Jam" has been described as a fusion of rap and deep house elements, as an early example of the hip house genre, and it has been considered the first Eurodance song to become a hit in the US.

Technotronic's vocalist Ya Kid K was initially overshadowed by Congolese model Felly Kilingi, who appears lip-syncing in the music video and was featured on the first album cover as a marketing tactic. Ya Kid K was ultimately recognized upon a U.S. tour and a repackaged album cover that featured her instead of Felly appeared thereafter. In 2005, the song was remixed by DJ-producer D.O.N.S. and reached number one on the British Dance Chart. The Guardian featured the song on their "A History of Modern Music: Dance" in 2011. In 2020 and 2025, Slant Magazine and Billboard magazine included it in their lists of the best dance songs of all time. The song was covered by Lil Uzi Vert in 2021 for the movie Space Jam: A New Legacy.

== Background and release ==
"She didn't actually sing on the record. What a situation! I saw trouble. Now Felly is learning to speak English, but at that time she spoke only French. She did interviews in the States - in French. I'm glad it's over now. But I am very grateful to her. She brought something to Technotronic. She was the image."

— producer Jo Bogaert talking about the song in 1990.

Belgian musician, songwriter, and record producer Jo Bogaert had previously had a few successes in his native Belgium, but struggled with exporting the music to other countries. Since some of his previous dance records had experienced popularity in American clubs, he was therefore determined to have a hit in the US. He said in an interview with Los Angeles Times, "It was very difficult for us to export music to other countries. But some of my dance records were popular in U.S. dance clubs and I knew that if I hooked up with the right people, I could make a record that would be a hit in the U.S." After meeting Congolese–Belgian singer and songwriter Ya Kid K (a.k.a. Manuela Barbara Kamosi Moaso Djogi) and Welsh rapper MC Eric (a.k.a. Eric Martin), Bogaert used Ya Kid K's lyrics and vocals and they constructed what would become "Pump Up the Jam", a fresh, compelling fusion of rap and deep house elements.

On the unexpected success of the song, Bogaert commented, "I knew, yeah, this was a good track, but my farthest expectation was that it would be a club hit." Martin later said, "The hairs on my arms stood up and I knew that it was history." On the release, Bogaert is credited as producer (as Thomas de Quincey). The song was picked up for US release by SBK Records. Although it used Ya Kid K's lyrics and voice on the track, it was the Congolese model Felly Kilingi who was seen on the album and in the accompanying music video. The reason was because the Belgian ARS record company, who bought the rights to the song, wanted a face fronting it. Ya Kid K was in a hip-hop band at the time, still going to school and did not want to do the promotion and video. ARS then came up with the idea of having Felly promoting the record and being on the record sleeve.

== Critical reception ==
Bill Coleman from Billboard magazine complimented "Pump Up the Jam" as "yet another uptempo club track that doesn't try to be anything but a party song. Memorable hook both instrumentally and in the chorus keeps the crowd humming and is sure to find success stateside when it's released imminently on SBK Records." Harry Sumrall from Knight Ridder felt it has "a beat the size of Boston, but Felly also sings with an unstoppable R&B swagger." Dennis Hunt from Los Angeles Times named it "a hyperkinetic, booming-bass number that may be the most popular dance-club tune since M.A.R.R.S.' 'Pump Up the Volume'." Bob Stanley from Melody Maker wrote, "Not only was it a compelling dance music track with a chorus so contagious it could keep you awake at night, it also formed part of the best Top Three in years when it was sandwiched between Black Box ['Ride on Time'] and Sidney Youngblood ['If Only I Could']."

Diana Valois from The Morning Call described it as a "sensuous groove" that "featured an irresistible bass line that threatened to start an avalanches; unleashed in the clubs, it motivated happy dancers instead." Pan-European magazine Music & Media commented, "A really hot hip/house track by Technotronic. This track is more than just a beat because of Felly's seductive voice. Another great track from the home of hithouse." David Hinckley from New York Daily News complimented it as "catchy". Parry Gettelman from The Sentinel remarked the song's "throbbing mixture of house music and Euro-disco". Another TS editor, Rosemary Banks Harris, felt the sound is "intoxicating". A reviewer from People Magazine wrote that the song "is so enticing, the production so crisp and precise, that most people would have to put on a straitjacket to keep from bouncing around to the beat." Gary Graff from The Province described it as "simple, spare and relentlessly rhythmic".

== Chart performance ==
"Pump Up the Jam" proved to be very successful on the charts on several continents. It reached number 1 in Belgium, Finland, Iceland, Portugal, and Spain. In addition, the single also reached number 2 in Austria, Luxembourg, the Netherlands, Switzerland, the United Kingdom, and Western-Germany. On the UK Singles Chart, it reached that position in its sixth week, on 1 October 1989. On the Eurochart Hot 100, it went to number 3 same month, after six weeks on the chart.

"Yes, it is exactly that: a song. People sing along, they know the lyrics. Well, not all the lyrics. Most think Manuela [Ya Kid K] sings 'I want, a place to stay', but she sings 'Awa, a place to stay.' Awa is Swahili (or Lingala, I'm not sure) for 'a place to stay, a home'. Beyond all expectations PUTJ still sounds fresh, I am told."

— Bogaert talking about the song in 2020.

Outside Europe, "Pump Up the Jam" peaked at number 4 in Canada, but made it to number 1 on the RPM Dance chart. It also reached number 1 on the US Billboard Hot Dance Club Play chart and the Cash Box Top 100. On the Billboard Hot 100, it reached number 2. The single was recognized by the magazine as having the highest sales points, but since Bolton's song "How Am I Supposed to Live Without You" had a lead in airplay points, it was given the top position on the Hot 100 chart. In Australia and New Zealand, the single reached number 4, while it also peaked at number 1 in Zimbabwe.

It was awarded with a Gold record in the Netherlands and the United Kingdom, after 40,000 and 400,000 singles were sold. It was certified Silver in France (125,000), and Platinum in Australia (70,000) and the United States (1,000,000).

== Music video ==
A music video was produced to promote the single, having model Felly Kilingi lip syncing the vocals, while dancing, wearing different costumes throughout the video. Catherine Texier for New York Times commented, "Technotronic's "Pump Up the Jam", as commercial as it is, features a sweaty Felly who's all power and muscles, and even though her leotard shows a lot of breast and thigh, her message is more athletic than sexual, or, if it is sex, she's the one pumping the jam." The video was later made available by Vevo on YouTube in June 2010 and has been remastered in HD. By April 2025, it had generated more than 367 million views.

== Retrospective response ==
AllMusic editor Alex Henderson described "Pump Up the Jam" as "highly infectious". British NME ranked the song number four in their list of "Top Five Euro-Hits of All Time" in December 1993, writing, "The late '80s, and the Top Ten gets invaded by a record which has a video consisting only of endless footage of outer space. A nation is baffled. Thumping techno-pop at its most compelling." In 1994, Nicole Leedham from The Canberra Times remarked that the song and its follow-up, "Get Up! (Before the Night Is Over)", were pushing the envelope of dance music in the late '80s. In 2004, Stylus Magazine writer Nick Southall named the song "Belgium's finest club banger". An editor of Complex stated that it was the first house track to crack into the mainstream, adding it as "the perfect track at the perfect time."

In 2018, Insomniac said it's "one of the best dance songs of all time, because—while it should have disappeared in our cultural memory as a sort of punchline or joke or some one-hit wonder—it's still an infinitely playable tune that works in literally any dancefloor context. It doesn't get old, for some reason, and continues to thrive to this day. It's dancefloor perfection." In 2016, Josh Baines from Vice named it "a towering masterpiece." In 2024, Classic Pop ranked "Pump Up the Jam" number four in their list of "Top 20 80s House Hits". In March 2025, Billboard magazine ranked it number 37 in their "The 100 Best Dance Songs of All Time", writing, "Technotronic's Belgium-based producer Joe Bogaert tapped another dancefloor classic, Marshall Jefferson's "Move Your Body", to serve as the track's foundation. But it's the androgynous, sexy Ya Kid K's rapping and singing – both delivered with almost sneering confidence – which elevate the song, propelling it to being one of the most memorable dance anthems of the Jock Jams era and beyond."

== In popular culture ==
As a running gag, the 2022 British mockumentary series Cunk on Earth, featuring character Philomena Cunk, repeatedly segues to the music video of "Pump Up the Jam" despite its irrelevance to the historical events being discussed. Another series in the canon of Cunk's mockumentaries, Cunk on Life (2024) and Cunk on Cinema (2026), repeat the joke.

== Accolades ==
Year	Publisher	Country	Accolade	Rank
1989	The Face	United Kingdom	"Recordings of the Year" (Singles)	30 (40)
1993	NME	United Kingdom	"Top Five Euro-Hits of All Time"	4
1995	Life	United States	"The Best Recordings of the 90's"	*
2005	Bruce Pollock	United States	"The 7,500 Most Important Songs of 1944-2000"	*
2010	Robert Dimery	United States	"1,001 Songs You Must Hear Before You Die"	*
2011	The Guardian	United Kingdom	"A History of Modern Music: Dance"	*
2013	Complex	United States	"15 Songs That Gave Dance Music a Good Name"	*
2015	Les Inrockuptibles	France	"1000 morceaux indispensables"	*
2017	BuzzFeed	United States	"The 101 Greatest Dance Songs of the '90s"	21
2018	Time Out	United Kingdom	"The 100 Best Party Songs"	32
2019	Billboard	United States	"Billboard's Top Songs of the '90s"	83
2020	Slant Magazine	United States	"The 100 Best Dance Songs of All Time"	40
2022	Time Out	United Kingdom	"The 100 Best Party Songs Ever Made"	17
2022	Billboard	United States	"The Biggest No. 2 Hot 100 Hits of All Time"	47
2024	Billboard	United States	"The 100 Greatest Jock Jams of All Time"	51
2024	Classic Pop	United Kingdom	"Top 20 80s House Hits"	4
2025	Billboard	United States	"The 100 Best Dance Songs of All Time"	37

(*) indicates the list is unordered.

== Track listing ==
Multiple versions and re-releases were produced for the "Pump Up the Jam" singles.

- 7-inch single (2-track)
1. Pump Up The Jam (7" Version) – 3:36
2. Pump Up The Jam (Jam Edit Mix) – 5:00
- Standard CD single (4-track)
1. 7" Version – 3:38
2. Vocal Attack – 5:26
3. Jam Edit Mix – 4:58
4. Original Mix – 5:03
- The Sequel (5-track)
1. Tin Tin Out Of the Radio Mix – 3:52
2. Dancing Divaz Radio Mix – 3:51
3. London Jam – 4:58
4. Tin Tin Out Of the Club Mix – 7:16
5. Dancing Divaz Master Mix – 5:33
- The Sequel (8-track)
1. Dancing Divas Radio Mix – 3:52
2. Dancing Divas Master Mix – 5:35
3. Sequential One Club Mix – 5:16
4. Tin Tin Out Club Mix – 7:17
5. Sequential One Radio Mix – 3:36
6. Tin Tin Out Radio Mix – 3:52
7. Sol Brothers Pumpin Mix – 8:19
8. Pulsar Village Mix – 5:52
- Remixes
1. U.S. Mix – 6:53
2. Sunshine Mix – 4:39
3. Hithouse Mix – 7:52
4. The Punami Mix – 6:18
5. Todd Terry Dome Mix – 5:24
6. Top FM Mix – 4:41
7. Vocal Attack Mix – 5:22
8. B-Room Mix – 4:52
9. Red Zone Mix – 7:27
10. Scuffed Prophecy Mix – 3:03
- The Remixes
1. U.S. Mix by David Morales – 6:56
2. Sunshine Mix by David Morales – 4:41
3. Hithouse Mix by Peter "Hithouse" Slaghuis – 7:56
4. Top FM Mix by Kevin J. and R. Cue – 4:44
5. The Punami Mix by The Wing Command – 6:20
6. B-Room Mix by David Morales – 4:53
7. Manouche Jazz Remix by The Lost Fingers – 3:49
- '96
1. Tin Tin Out Radio Mix – 3:51
2. Sol Brothers Pumpin' Mix – 8:18
3. Dancing Divas Mix – 8:12
4. Seventies Jam Part 2 – 5:28
5. Sol Brothers Deep Vocal Mix – 7:58
6. Pulsar Village Mix – 5:50
- The Sequel
1. Tin Tin Out Radio Mix – 3:51
2. Sequential One Radio Mix – 3:34
3. Pulsar Radio Mix – 3:15
4. Village Mix – 5:51
5. Dancing Divaz Master Mix – 5:34
6. Sequential One Club Mix – 5:15

== Charts ==
=== Weekly charts ===
Original version

Chart (1989–1990)	Peak position
Australia (ARIA)	4
Austria (Ö3 Austria Top 40)	2
Belgium (Ultratop 50 Flanders)	1
Canada Top Singles (RPM)	4
Canada Dance/Urban (RPM)	1
Canada Retail Sales (RPM)	1
Europe (Eurochart Hot 100)	3
Finland (Suomen virallinen lista)	2
France (SNEP)	7
Greece (IFPI)	1
Iceland (Íslenski Listinn Topp 10)	1
Israel (Israeli Singles Chart)	8
Italy (Musica e dischi)	4
Luxembourg (Radio Luxembourg)	2
Netherlands (Dutch Top 40)	2
Netherlands (Single Top 100)	2
New Zealand (Recorded Music NZ)	4
Norway (VG-lista)	5
Portugal (AFP)	1
Quebec (ADISQ)	9
Spain (AFYVE)	1
Sweden (Sverigetopplistan)	4
Switzerland (Schweizer Hitparade)	2
UK Singles (Official Charts)	2
US Billboard Hot 100	2
US 12-inch Singles Sales (Billboard)	1
US Hot Black Singles (Billboard)	10
US Hot Dance Club Play (Billboard)	1
US Cash Box Top 100	1
West Germany (GfK)	2
Zimbabwe (ZIMA)	1

"Pump Up the Jam '96"

Chart (1996)	Peak position
Europe (Eurochart Hot 100)	99
Scotland (OCC)	37
UK Singles (Official Charts)	36
UK Pop Tip Club Chart (Music Week)	2

"Pump Up the Jam" by D.O.N.S. featuring Technotronic

Chart (1998)	Peak position
Austria (Ö3 Austria Top 40)	34
Belgium (Ultratip Bubbling Under Flanders)	7
Germany (GfK)	25

"Pump Up the Jam 2005" by D.O.N.S. featuring Technotronic

Chart (2005)	Peak position
Australia (ARIA Charts)	77
Belgium (Ultratop 50 Flanders)	46
Finland (Suomen virallinen lista)	11
Germany (GfK)	72
Ireland (IRMA)	25
Netherlands (Single Top 100)	43
UK Singles (Official Charts)	22
US Dance Singles Sales (Billboard)	24

=== Year-end charts ===
Chart (1989)	Position
Belgium (Ultratop)	3
Europe (Eurochart Hot 100 Singles)	7
Israel (Israeli Singles Chart)	24
Netherlands (Dutch Top 40)	21
Netherlands (Single Top 100)	12
UK Singles (OCC)	8
US Hot Dance Club Play (Billboard)	49
West Germany (Media Control)	24

Chart (1990)	Position
Australia (ARIA)	27
Canada Top Singles (RPM)	55
Canada Dance/Urban (RPM)	38
Europe (Eurochart Hot 100 Singles)	79
Germany (Media Control)	36
Switzerland (Schweizer Hitparade)	17
US Billboard Hot 100	13
US 12-inch Singles Sales (Billboard)	1
US Hot Dance Club Play (Billboard)	47
US Hot R&B Singles (Billboard)	79

Chart (1996)	Position
UK Club Chart (Music Week)	94
UK Pop Tip Club Chart (Music Week)	17

== Certifications and sales ==
Region	Certification	Certified units/sales
Australia (ARIA)	Platinum	70,000^{^}
France (SNEP)	Silver	125,000^{*}
Italy (FIMI)	Gold	50,000^{‡}
Netherlands (NVPI)	Gold	75,000^{^}
Spain (Promusicae)	Gold	30,000^{‡}
United Kingdom (BPI) Digital	Platinum	600,000^{‡}
United Kingdom (BPI) Physical	Gold	400,000^{^}
United States (RIAA)	Platinum	1,000,000^{^}
^{*} Sales figures based on certification alone.^{^} Shipments figures based on certification alone.^{‡} Sales+streaming figures based on certification alone.

== M.C. Sar & the Real McCoy version ==
"Pump Up the Jam"
- One of the variants of 1989 standard artwork

Single by M.C. Sar & the Real McCoy

from the album On the Move!
- Released: 1989
- Length: 5:58
- Label: ZYX
- Songwriters: Manuela Kamosi; Thomas de Quincey
- Producers: Juergen Wind; Quickmix

M.C. Sar & the Real McCoy singles chronology
"Pump Up the Jam" (1989)	"It's on You" (1990)

M.C. Sar & the Real McCoy singles chronology
"(If You're Not in It for Love) I'm Outta Here" (1997)	"Pump Up the Jam - Rap '98" (1998)	"It's on You '99" (1999)

In 1989, ZYX Records released a cover version of "Pump Up the Jam" by M.C. Sar & the Real McCoy. The single reached number 16 in West Germany and number 100 on the Dutch Single Top 100.

=== Track listing ===
- 1989 CD maxi single
1. "Pump Up the Jam" (Original Rap Version) – 5:58
2. "Pump Up the Jam" (Jam-Jam Quick House Version) – 5:43
3. "Pump Up the Jam" (Acapella) — 1:46
1. "Pump Up the Jam" (Freshbeats and Pieces) – 1:06
2. "Get Funky" – 4:02
- 1989 7-inch single
1. "Pump Up the Jam" (Original Rap Version – Edit) – 3:51
2. "Get Funky" – 4:02
- "Pump Up the Jam – Rap '98"
1. "Pump Up the Jam – Rap '98" (radio mix) – 3:20
2. "Pump Up the Jam – Rap '98" (extended mix) – 4:29
3. "Pump Up the Jam – Rap '98" (derezon remix) – 3:48
4. "Pump Up the Jam – Rap '98" (beats and pieces) – 1:31
5. "Pump Up the Jam – Rap '98" (original US remix '98) – 6:13
6. "Da Dome" – 3:54

=== Charts ===
Chart (1989–1990)	Peak position
Europe (Eurochart Hot 100)	71
Netherlands (Single Top 100)	100
West Germany (GfK)	16

== See also ==
- List of number-one hits of 1989 (Flanders)
- List of Cash Box Top 100 number-one singles of 1990
- List of RPM number-one dance singles of 1989
- List of number-one singles of 1989 (Spain)
- List of number-one dance singles of 1989 (U.S.)
