= Eric Martin (Welsh singer) =

Jamaican-Welsh musician & record producer (born 1970)

Me One
- Also known as: MC Eric
- Born: Eric Martin; 19 August 1970 (age 56); Cardiff, Wales
- Occupations: Musician, rapper, singer, songwriter, record producer
- Formerly of: Technotronic

Eric Martin (born 19 August 1970), also known by his stage names MC Eric and Me One, is a Welsh musician, rapper, singer, songwriter and record producer, who rose to prominence for his work for the Belgian-based recording act Technotronic.

== Early life ==
Martin was born in Cardiff, Wales to Jamaican parents; his mother an English teacher from Kingston and his father a Pentecostal Church minister from Saint Mary Parish. He is the youngest of thirteen children.

Martin was educated in Cardiff (Fitzalan High School), London and New York City. He holds dual Jamaican and British citizenship.

== Work with Technotronic ==
Martin (as MC Eric) was a member of techno/Eurodance act Technotronic, providing lead vocals on the 1990 hit single "This Beat Is Technotronic". He was also lead vocalist on the songs "Tough", and the cd-only bonus track "Wave. At the height of their career, they toured with Madonna on her Blond Ambition World Tour in the 1990s.

== 2000s–present ==
Martin's debut album under the name Me One was released in May 2000 on Universal-Island UK. The 12-track release was titled As Far as I'm Concerned and featured Guru (from Gang Starr) on "Do You Know" and Michelle Gayle on "In My Room" which interpolates the Beach Boys song of the same name. The latter was released as a single, along with "Game Plan" and "Old Fashioned".

Aside from his solo work, Martin has written with (or for) Jeff Beck, Maxi Priest, the Roots, Capleton, Lynden David Hall and the Sugababes.

In 2011, he signed a recording deal with Glasgow-based record label Innovation Music.

In September 2024, it was announced that Martin would receive the Welsh Music Inspiration award at the annual Welsh Music Prize.

He now lives in London; he was stuck in Newport during the COVID-19 pandemic.
