= Jo Bogaert =

Belgian musician and record producer

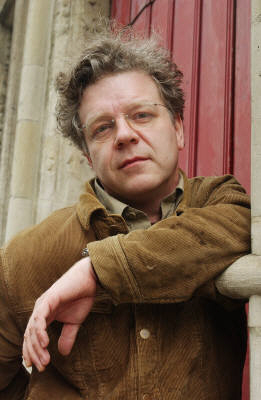
- Jo Bogaert
- Born: 1956 (age 69–70); Aalst, Belgium
- Other name: Thomas de Quincey
- Occupations: Musician; songwriter; record producer
- Known for: Creator of new beat groups like Technotronic, Nux Nemo, and Acts of Madmen

Jo Bogaert (born 1956) is a Belgian musician, songwriter, and record producer. Working under his own name and a long list of pseudonyms (usually Thomas de Quincey or a variation thereof), he is the man behind Technotronic and is considered to have been one of the most successful artists in the new beat genre.

== Early life and career ==
Bogaert was born in 1956 in Aalst, Belgium. His father ran an electronics shop. Bogaert studied philosophy and played in a number of bands in different genres, including blues and new wave. He released one album under his own name in 1984, None of Them Are Green. In 1987, he wrote the soundtrack for the theatre production Riot 88.

== New beat and Technotronic ==
In 1989, Bogaert (credited as Thomas de Quincey) created the project Technotronic, with which he released the single "Pump Up the Jam". The song eventually reached No. 2 on the Billboard Hot 100 and on the UK charts, and No. 1 in Flanders and Spain. The single sold 3.5 million copies worldwide. The group released a further string of hit singles, ending in 1992 with "Move This", which reached No. 6 on the Billboard Hot 100. They played as the opening act on Madonna's Blond Ambition World Tour.

During the same period, Bogaert was also behind a number of other new beat bands, including Nux Nemo and Acts of Madmen.

== Later career ==
Bogaert released Different Voices, a more ambient-oriented album, under his own name in 1993, and in 1996, he led the project Millennium (with one song featuring vocals by Robert Wyatt), but this didn't prove successful. His main work over the following decades was as a producer, often for techno and EDM acts but also for completely different genres. He produced the 1995 album Monstertje by Gorki. In 2000, he produced Oude maan, the first album in ten years by singer-songwriter Jan De Wilde. In 1999 and 2006, he worked with An Pierlé on her albums Mud Stories and White Velvet, respectively. In 2004, he collaborated with Gabriel Ríos on the album Ghostboy and again in 2007 on Angelhead; this record reached #2 on the Flemish charts. In 2015, Bogaert wrote Dag meneer De Wilde, a biography of Jan De Wilde. He also wrote two books about his hometown of Aalst and a work on painter Jan van Eyck.

== Solo discography ==
- None of Them Are Green (1984)
- Riot 88 (1987)
- Different Voices (1993)
