= Amy Grant discography =

Cataloguing of published recordings by Amy Grant

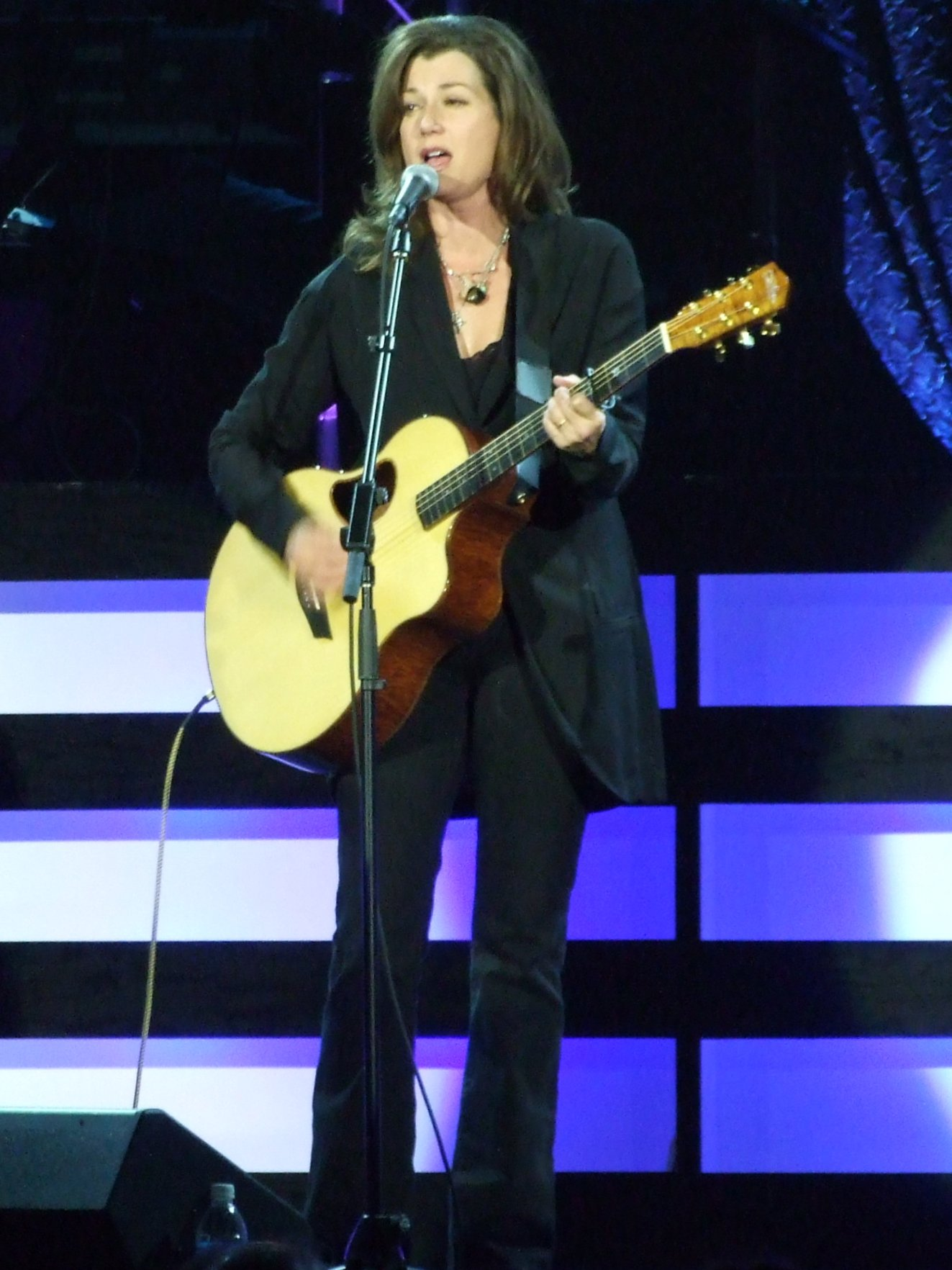
- Grant performing in West Wendover, Nevada on the 20th anniversary tour of the release of Lead Me On, October 2008
- Studio albums: 20
- Live albums: 5
- Compilation albums: 13
- Singles: 84

American singer Amy Grant has released 20 studio albums (including five Christmas albums), 11 compilation albums, five live albums, and 84 singles. Considered to be one of the pioneers in the contemporary Christian music genre, Grant was also the first major Christian artist to successfully cross over into the mainstream.

Amy Grant has sold over 30 million albums worldwide throughout her career, making her the Best Selling Contemporary Christian artist of all time. She has 17 No. 1 albums on Billboard's Top Christian Albums, more than any other artists in history. She is also known as the "Queen of Christian Pop" and the "Queen of Christmas Music" by various media outlets. According to RIAA, she has sold 17 million certified albums in the United States while Billboard listed her as the 46th Top Christian Artist of the 2010s. Capitol Christian Music Group honored Grant with a special award in honor of one billion career global streams.

At the age of 15, Grant signed a record deal with Myrrh Records. A year later in 1977, she released her self-titled debut album, which sold over 50,000 copies in its first year, a high total at the time for a Christian artist. Her follow-up albums My Father's Eyes (1978) and Never Alone (1980) reached the No. 1 spot on the Christian Albums chart, and 1982's Age to Age became the first Christian album recorded by a solo artist to receive gold and platinum certifications from the Recording Industry Association of America (RIAA). The album was atop the Christian Albums chart for a record 85 weeks and was the only No. 1 album to be released for the entire year of 1983.

Grant first experienced mainstream success with 1985's Unguarded, which became the first Christian album to yield a top 40 single on the Billboard Hot 100; the album was certified platinum by the RIAA. In 1986, she recorded her first No. 1 single on the Hot 100 with "The Next Time I Fall", a duet with Peter Cetera. Her 1988 album Lead Me On shipped with a gold certification, a first for a Christian album, but did not sell as well as Unguarded. However, it received substantial acclaim and is frequently ranked by critics as the best Christian album of all time.

Grant's 1991 album Heart in Motion became the best-selling Christian album of all time, selling over six million copies. Its single "Baby Baby" marked her second No. 1 single on the Hot 100, and it also charted in the top ten in Australia, Canada, Europe, and the UK. The album had five singles chart in the top 20 in the United States and Canada and was certified 5× platinum by the RIAA; it was also certified platinum in Australia, Canada, and Taiwan. Her 1994 album House of Love yielded two top 40 singles in the United States and three in Canada; it has been certified 2× platinum by the RIAA and platinum in Canada. Her albums Behind the Eyes (1997) and Legacy... Hymns and Faith (2002) have both been certified gold. Grant's most recent studio album, 2013's How Mercy Looks from Here, debuted at No. 12 on the Billboard 200 and was her sixteenth No. 1 album on the Christian Albums chart.

Grant is also known for her Christmas albums; her first, A Christmas Album, was released in 1983 as her fifth major release and has been certified platinum by the RIAA and gold in Canada. Home for Christmas, her eleventh major release and second Christmas album was released in 1992 and peaked at No. 2 on the Billboard 200, Grant's highest-charting album on the chart, and has been certified 3× platinum by the RIAA and gold in Canada. With over 2.5 million copies sold in the United States as of December 2014, it ranks as one of the best-selling Christmas albums since Nielsen SoundScan began tracking album sales in 1991.

== Albums ==
=== Studio albums ===
List of studio albums, with chart positions and certifications
Title	Album details	Peak chart positions								Certifications
Title	Album details	US	US Christ	AUS	CAN	NOR	SWE	SWI	UK	Certifications
Amy Grant	Released: February 3, 1977; Label: Myrrh Records; Format: 8-track, CD, cassette, digital download, LP	—	12	—	—	—	—	—	—	
My Father's Eyes	Released: April 20, 1979; Label: Myrrh; Format: 8-track, CD, cassette, digital download, LP	—	1	—	—	—	—	—	—	RIAA: Gold
Never Alone	Released: 1980; Label: Myrrh; Format: 8-track, CD, cassette, digital download, LP	—	1	—	—	—	—	—	—	
Age to Age	Released: May 1, 1982; Label: Myrrh; Format: 8-track, CD, cassette, digital download, LP	—	1	—	—	—	—	—	—	RIAA: Platinum; MC: Gold
Straight Ahead	Released: April 6, 1984; Label: Myrrh; Format: 8-track, CD, cassette, digital download, LP	133	1	—	—	—	—	—	—	RIAA: Gold; MC: Gold
Unguarded	Released: May 13, 1985; Label: A&M Records/Myrrh; Format: CD, cassette, digital download, LP	35	1	59	—	—	—	—	—	RIAA: Platinum; MC: Gold
Lead Me On	Released: June 20, 1988; Label: A&M/Myrrh; Format: CD, cassette, DCC, digital download, LP	71	1	—	82	—	—	—	—	RIAA: Gold; MC: Gold
Heart in Motion	Released: March 5, 1991; Label: A&M/Myrrh; Format: CD, cassette, digital download, LP	10	1	14	15	10	7	17	25	RIAA: 5× Platinum; ARIA: Platinum; BPI: Gold; MC: Platinum; Taiwan: 2× Platinum
House of Love	Released: August 23, 1994; Label: A&M/Myrrh; Format: CD, cassette, digital download	13	1	127	33	—	—	43	—	RIAA: 2× Platinum; MC: Platinum
Behind the Eyes	Released: September 9, 1997; Label: A&M/Myrrh; Format: CD, cassette, digital download	8	2	183	79	—	—	—	—	RIAA: Gold
Legacy... Hymns and Faith	Released: May 21, 2002; Label: A&M/Myrrh; Format: CD, cassette, digital download	21	1	—	—	—	—	—	—	RIAA: Gold
Simple Things	Released: August 19, 2003; Label: A&M/Myrrh; Format: CD, cassette, digital download	23	1	—	—	—	—	—	—	
Rock of Ages... Hymns and Faith	Released: May 3, 2005; Label: Word Records; Format: CD, digital download	42	1	—	—	—	—	—	—	
Somewhere Down the Road	Released: March 30, 2010; Label: EMI CMG/Sparrow Records; Format: CD, digital download	41	2	—	—	—	—	—	—	
How Mercy Looks from Here	Released: May 14, 2013; Label: Sparrow; Format: CD, digital download, LP	12	1	—	—	—	—	—	—	
The Me That Remains	Released: May 8, 2026; Label: Thirty Tigers; Format: CD, digital download, LP	— (Note: The Me That Remains did not enter the Billboard 200, but peaked at number 31 on the Top Album Sales chart.)	—	—	—	—	—	—	— (Note: The Me That Remains did not enter the OCC UK Albums Chart, but peaked at number 25 on the UK Americana Albums Chart.)	
"—" denotes releases that did not chart

=== Christmas studio albums ===
List of Christmas studio albums, with chart positions and certifications
Title	Album details	Peak chart positions			Certifications
Title	Album details	US	US Christ	US Holiday	Certifications
A Christmas Album	Released: September 27, 1983; Label: Myrrh Records; Format: 8-track, CD, cassette, digital download, LP	—	9	5	RIAA: Platinum; MC: Gold
The Animals' Christmas (w/ Art Garfunkel)	Released: 1986; Label: Sony; Format: CD, cassette, digital download, LP	—	—	—	
Home for Christmas	Released: October 6, 1992; Label: A&M Records; Format: CD, cassette, digital download, LP	2	1	1	RIAA: 3× Platinum; MC: Gold
A Christmas to Remember	Released: October 19, 1999; Label: A&M; Format: CD, cassette, digital download, LP	36	1	3	RIAA: Gold
Tennessee Christmas	Released: October 21, 2016; Label: Sparrow/Amy Grant; Format: CD, digital download, LP	31	1	3	
"—" denotes releases that did not chart

=== Compilation albums ===
List of compilation albums, with chart positions and certifications
Title	Album details	Peak chart positions				Certifications
Title	Album details	US	US Christ	US Dance	US Holiday	Certifications
The Collection	Released: July 22, 1986; Label: Myrrh; Format: CD, cassette, digital download, LP	66	1	—	—	RIAA: Platinum
Her Greatest Inspirational Songs	Released: March 19, 2002; Label: BMG Heritage; Format: CD, digital download	—	37	—	—	
Greatest Hits 1986–2004	Released: October 12, 2004; Label: Word Records/Curb Records/A&M Records; Format: CD, digital download	48	3	—	—	
Greatest Hits	Released: October 2, 2007; Label: EMI CMG; Format: CD, digital download	196	8	—	—	
The Christmas Collection	Released: September 30, 2008; Label: Sparrow; Format: CD, digital download	41	2	—	5	
Have Yourself a Merry Little Christmas	Released: September 27, 2011; Label: Amy Grant; Format: CD	199	20	—	15	
Christmas Memories	Released: 2011; Label: Sparrow/Amy Grant; Format: CD	174	15	—	49	
The Women of Faith Collection	Released: 2012; Label: Sparrow/Amy Grant; Format: CD	—	39	—	—	
Icon Christmas	Released: September 30, 2013; Label: Capitol CMG; Format: CD	— (Note: Icon Christmas did not chart on the Billboard 200, but it did peak at No. 151 on the Top Current Albums chart.)	8	—	—	
In Motion: The Remixes	Released: August 19, 2014; Label: Sparrow; Format: CD, digital download, LP	110	8	5	—	
Be Still and Know... Hymns & Faith	Released: April 14, 2015; Label: Sparrow/Amy Grant; Format: CD, digital download	—	7	—	—	
The Journey	Released: April 4, 2025; Label: Capitol CMG; Format: CD, digital download	—	—	—	—	
The Hits	Released: April 11, 2025; Label: Capitol CMG; Format: CD, digital download	—	—	—	—	
"—" denotes releases that did not chart

=== Live albums ===
List of live albums, with chart positions
Title	Album details	Peak chart positions	
Title	Album details	US	US Christ
In Concert	Released: 1981; Label: Myrrh Records; Format: CD, cassette, digital download, LP	—	—
In Concert Volume Two	Released: 1981; Label: Myrrh; Format: CD, cassette, digital download, LP	—	—
A Moment in Time EP (w/ Gary Chapman and Michael W. Smith)	Released: 1989; Label: Myrrh/Reunion Records; Format: Cassette	—	4
Time Again... Amy Grant Live	Released: September 26, 2006; Label: Word Records; Format: CD, digital download	87	6
Lead Me On Live 1989	Released: October 6, 2023; Label: Amy Grant/Capitol CMG; Format: CD, digital download, streaming	—	—
"—" denotes releases that did not chart

=== Video albums ===
List of video releases, with chart positions and certifications
Title	Album details	Peak chart positions	Certifications
Title	Album details	US Video	Certifications
In Concert: Age to Age Tour	Released: 1984; Label: A&M Video; Format: LaserDisc, VHS	—	
The Heart in Motion Video Collection	Released: November 19, 1991; Label: A&M Records; Format: LaserDisc, VHS	6	RIAA: Gold
Amy Grant's Old-Fashioned Christmas	Released: October 20, 1992; Label: Smith/Hemion Productions; Format: LaserDisc, VHS	27	RIAA: Gold
Building the House of Love	Released: January 17, 1995; Label: A&M; Format: LaserDisc, VHS	31	
Greatest Video Hits	Released: October 12, 2004; Label: A&M; Format: DVD	21	
Time Again... Amy Grant Live	Released: September 26, 2006; Label: Word Records; Format: DVD	31	
"—" denotes releases that did not chart

== Singles ==
=== 1970s–1980s ===
List of singles, with selected chart positions
Title	Year	Peak chart positions						Album
Title	Year	US	US AC	US Christ AC	US Christ CHR	AUS	CAN AC	Album
"Old Man's Rubble"	1978	—	—	2		—	—	Amy Grant
"What a Difference You've Made"	1978	—	—	5		—	—	Amy Grant
"Beautiful Music"	1978	—	—	10		—	—	Amy Grant
"Faith Walkin' People"	1979	—	—	10		—	—	My Father's Eyes
"Father's Eyes"	1979	—	—	3		—	—	My Father's Eyes
"Look What Has Happened to Me"	1980	—	—	3		—	—	Never Alone
"That's The Day"	1980	—	—	—		—	—	Never Alone
"Singing a Love Song"	1981	—	—	13	5	—	—	In Concert
"I'm Gonna Fly"	1982	—	—	10	4	—	—	In Concert Volume Two
"Sing Your Praise to the Lord"	1982	—	—	1	1	—	—	Age to Age
"El Shaddai"	1982	—	—	2		—	—	Age to Age
"In a Little While"	1982	—	—	5		—	—	Age to Age
"Ageless Medley"	1983	—	—	10		—	—	Non-album single
"Emmanuel"	1984	—	—	20		—	—	A Christmas Album
"Angels"	1984	—	—	1		—	—	Straight Ahead
"Thy Word"	1984	—	—	4		—	—	Straight Ahead
"Jehovah"	1984	—	—	2		—	—	Straight Ahead
"The Now and the Not Yet"	1984	—	—	20		—	—	Straight Ahead
"Find a Way"	1985	29	7	2	1	98	1	Unguarded
"Wise Up"	1985	66	34	19	2	—	—	Unguarded
"Everywhere I Go"	1985	—	28	2	4	—	—	Unguarded
"Sharayah"	1986	—	—	6	2	—	—	Unguarded
"The Prodigal"	1986	—	—	31	—	—	—	Unguarded
"Love of Another Kind"	1986	—	—	—	12	—	—	Unguarded
"Stay for Awhile"	1986	—	18	2	1	—	25	The Collection
"Love Can Do"	1986	—	—	6	6	—	—	The Collection
"Saved by Love"	1988	—	32	1	1	172	—	Lead Me On
"Lead Me On"	1988	96	—	5	1	—	—	Lead Me On
"1974"	1988	—	31	1	2	—	—	Lead Me On
"What About the Love"	1989	—	—	1	1	—	—	Lead Me On
"Say Once More"	1989	—	—	8	2	—	—	Lead Me On
"'Tis So Sweet to Trust in Jesus"	1989	—	—	2	—	—	—	Our Hymns
"—" denotes releases that did not chart

=== 1990s ===
List of singles, with selected chart positions and certifications
Title	Year	Peak chart positions										Certifications	Album
Title	Year	US	US AC	US Christ AC	US Christ CHR	AUS	CAN	GER	NZ	SWE	UK	Certifications	Album
"Faithless Heart"	1990	—	—	12	16	—	—	—	—	—	—		Lead Me On
"Baby Baby"	1991	1	1	—	13	5	2	8	2	5	2	ARIA: Gold; BPI: Silver	Heart in Motion
"Every Heartbeat"	1991	2	2	17	2	17	7	37	27	25	25		Heart in Motion
"Good For Me"	1991	8	4	—	—	65	5	52	—	—	60		Heart in Motion
"That's What Love Is For"	1991	7	1	3	1	68	7	78	—	—	60		Heart in Motion
"Hope Set High"	1991	—	—	1	3	—	—	—	—	—	—		Heart in Motion
"Ask Me"	1992	—	—	1	3	—	—	—	—	—	—		Heart in Motion
"I Will Remember You"	1992	20	2	17	4	—	9	—	—	—	—		Heart in Motion
"Breath of Heaven (Mary's Song)"	1992	—	—	1	—	—	—	—	—	—	—		Home for Christmas
"We Believe In God"	1993	—	—	1	—	—	—	—	—	—	—		Songs From the Loft
"Hey Now"	1994	—	—	8	—	—	—	—	—	—	—		Songs From the Loft
"Lucky One"	1994	18	2	—	—	147	4	56	—	—	60		House of Love
"Children of the World"	1994	—	—	1	1	109	—	—	—	—	—		House of Love
"House of Love" (with Vince Gill)	1994	37	5	—	—	—	9	—	—	—	46		House of Love
"Say You'll Be Mine"	1994	—	—	—	—	—	—	—	—	—	41		House of Love
"Big Yellow Taxi"	1995	67	18	—	—	156	25	—	—	—	20		House of Love
"Love Has a Hold on Me"	1995	—	—	3	6	—	—	—	—	—	—		House of Love
"Helping Hand"	1995	—	—	4	1	—	—	—	—	—	—		House of Love
"Lover of My Soul"	1995	—	—	1	4	—	—	—	—	—	—		My Utmost For His Highest
"Oh How the Years Go By"	1995	—	—	12	11	—	—	—	—	—	—		House of Love
"The Things We Do for Love"	1996	—	24	—	—	—	41	—	—	—	—		Mr. Wrong: Music from the Original Motion Picture Soundtrack
"Takes a Little Time"	1997	— (Note: "Takes a Little Time" did not chart on the Billboard Hot 100, but it did peak at No. 21 on the Billboard Radio Songs chart.)	4	9	9	181	13	—	—	—	—		Behind the Eyes
"Somewhere Down the Road"	1997	—	—	2	11	—	—	—	—	—	—		Behind the Eyes
"Turn this World Around"	1998	—	—	13	18	—	—	—	—	—	—		Behind the Eyes
"Like I Love You"	1998	—	10	—	—	—	47	—	—	—	—		Behind the Eyes
"I Will Be Your Friend"	1998	—	27	10	24	—	—	—	—	—	—		Behind the Eyes
"Nothing Is Beyond You" (with A Ragamuffin Band)	1998	—	—	1	—	—	—	—	—	—	—		The Jesus Record
"Shine All Your Light"	1999	—	—	25	—	—	—	—	—	—	—		Touched by an Angel: The Album
"—" denotes releases that did not chart

=== 2000s–present ===
List of singles, with chart positions
Title	Year	Peak chart positions				Album
Title	Year	US AC	US Christ.	US Christ. Airplay	US Christ. AC	Album
"The River's Gonna Keep on Rolling"	2002	—	— (Note: "The River's Gonna Keep on Rollin" was released before the Billboard Christian Songs chart was created, but it did peak at No. 18 on Radio & Records Christian AC chart.)		—	Legacy... Hymns and Faith
"This is My Father's World"	2002	—	—		—	Legacy... Hymns and Faith
"Simple Things"	2003	23	7		6	Simple Things
"Out in the Open"	2003	—	24		21	Simple Things
"The Water"	2004	—	32		28	Greatest Hits 1986–2004
"Come Be With Me" (with Keb' Mo')	2004	32	—		—	Greatest Hits 1986–2004
"God Is With Us"	2004	—	3		2	Gloria
"Carry You"	2005	—	—		39	Rock of Ages... Hymns and Faith
"I Need a Silent Night"	2008	29	12		7	The Christmas Collection
"She Colors My Day"	2009	—	36		—	She Colors My Day EP
"Better Than a Hallelujah"	2010	—	8		15	Somewhere Down the Road
"Don't Try So Hard" (with James Taylor)	2013	—	24		25	How Mercy Looks from Here
"If I Could See (What the Angels See)"	2013	—	35		—	How Mercy Looks from Here
"Welcome Yourself"	2014	—	— (Note: "Welcome Yourself" did not chart on the Billboard Christian Songs chart, but it did peak at No. 33 on the Billboard Christian Digital Song Sales chart.)	—	—	Non-album single
"To Be Together"	2016	—	32	—	9	Tennessee Christmas
"Say It With a Kiss"	2018	—	—	—	—	Non-album single
"Put A Little Love In Your Heart"	2022	—	—	—	—	Non-album single
"Trees We'll Never See"	2023	—	—	—	—	Non-album single
"What You Heard"	2023	—	—	—	—	Non-album single
"Home (Lyana's Song From Caretaker)" (with R.J. Halbert)	2025	—	—	—	—	Non-album single
"The 6th of January (Yasgur's Farm)"	2026	—	—	—	—	The Me That Remains
"—" denotes releases that did not chart

=== As featured artist ===
List of singles as featured artist, with chart positions
Title	Year	Peak chart positions							Album
Title	Year	US	US AC	US Christ.	US Christ. Airplay	US Christ. AC	CAN	CAN AC	Album
"Nobody Loves Me" (with DeGarmo and Key)	1981	—	—	— (Note: "Nobody Loves Me" was released before the Billboard Christian Songs chart was created, but it did peak at No. 6 on The CCM Update Christian Hit Radio chart.)		—	—	—	This Ain't Hollywood
"Friends" (with Michael W. Smith)	1983	—	—	— (Note: "Friends" was released before the Billboard Christian Songs chart was created, but it did peak at No. 7 on The CCM Update Christian Hit Radio chart.)		—	—	—	Michael W. Smith Project
"I Could Never Say Goodbye" (with Randy Stonehill)	1985	—	—	— (Note: "I Could Never Say Goodbye" was released before the Billboard Christian Songs chart was created, but it did peak at No. 4 on The CCM Update Christian Hit Radio chart and No. 9 on The CCM Update Adult Contemporary chart.)		—	—	—	Love Beyond Reason
"The Next Time I Fall" (with Peter Cetera)	1986	1	1	— (Note: "The Next Time I Fall" was released before the Billboard Christian Songs chart was created. In 2011, it peaked at No. 31 on the Billboard Christian Digital Song Sales chart.)		—	1	1	Solitude/Solitaire
"Emmanuel" (with Michael W. Smith)	1996	—	—	— (Note: "Emmanuel" was released before the Billboard Christian Songs chart was created, but it did peak at No. 37 on The CCM Update Adult Contemporary chart.)		—	—	—	Emmanuel: A Musical Celebration of the Life of Christ
"Friends 2003" (with Anointed, Avalon, Steven Curtis Chapman, Point Of Grace, Mac Powell, Michael Tait, and CeCe Winans)	2003	—	—	39		—	—	—	The Second Decade (1993-2003)
"Silent Night" (with MercyMe)	2005	—	6	30		—	—	—	The Christmas Sessions
"Give This Christmas Away" (with Matthew West)	2009	—	—	1		1	—	—	The Heart of Christmas
"I'm With You (Ruth and Naomi)" (with Nichole Nordeman)	2011	—	—	28		29	—	—	Music Inspired by The Story
"Almost There" (with Michael W. Smith)	2014	—	—	27	35	—	—	—	The Spirit of Christmas
"I Belong" (with Tim Timmons)	2018	—	—	—	39	—	—	—	Non-album single
"Silver Bells" (with Marc Martel & Michael W. Smith)	2019	—	—	22	7	1	—	—	The Christmas Collection
"The Christmas Waltz" (with Marc Martel)	2020	—	—	40	17	10	—	—	Thank God It's Christmas
"Hello Christmas" (with Dion)	2020	—	—	—	—	—	—	—	Non-album singles
"Come You Unfaithful" (Michael Boggs featuring Amy Grant)	2025	—	—	—	8	9	—	—	Non-album singles
"God Winks" (Annie Bosko featuring Amy Grant)	2025	—	—	—	—	—	—	—	Non-album singles
"—" denotes releases that did not chart

== Promotional singles ==
List of promotional singles
Title	Year	Album
"The Me That Remains"	2026	The Me That Remains
"How Do We Get There From Here" (featuring Ruby Amanfu)	2026	The Me That Remains

== Other charted songs ==
List of other charting songs, with chart positions
Title	Year	Peak chart positions					Album
Title	Year	US Christ.	US Dance	US Club	US Holiday	US Holiday Airplay	Album
"Baby Baby (7" Heart In Motion Mix)"	1991	—	—	23	—	—	Non-album release
"It's the Most Wonderful Time of the Year"	2002	—	—	—	39	2	Home for Christmas
"Have Yourself a Merry Little Christmas"	2002	—	—	—	—	6	Home for Christmas
"Winter Wonderland"	2002	—	—	—	39	7	Home for Christmas
"Grown-Up Christmas List"	2002	— (Note: "Grown-Up Christmas List" was released before the Billboard Christian Songs chart was created. In 2017, it peaked at No. 11 on the Billboard Christian Digital Song Sales chart.)	—	—	52	8	Home for Christmas
"I'll Be Home for Christmas"	2002	—	—	—	—	9	Home for Christmas
"Sleigh Ride"	2002	—	—	—	29	12	A Christmas Album
"Hark! The Herald Angels Sing"	2002	—	—	—	—	14	A Christmas Album
"A Mighty Fortress/Angels We Have Heard on High"	2002	—	—	—	—	15	A Christmas Album
"Breath of Heaven (Mary's Song)"	2015	— (Note: "Breath of Heaven (Mary's Song)" was released before the Billboard Christian Songs chart was created. In 2011, it peaked at No. 2 on the Billboard Christian Digital Song Sales chart.)	—	—	40	—	Home for Christmas
"Baby Baby (Radio Edit)" (with Dave Audé)	2014	—	28	3	—	—	In Motion: The Remixes
"Every Heartbeat (Radio Edit)" (with Moto Blanco)	2014	—	44	13	—	—	In Motion: The Remixes
"Baby Baby" (with Tori Kelly)	2016	8	—	—	—	—	Non-album release
"Tennessee Christmas"	2016	49	—	—	—	—	Tennessee Christmas
"Rockin' Around the Christmas Tree"	2019	—	—	—	—	47	Home for Christmas
"—" denotes releases that did not chart

== General references ==
- Powell, Mark Allan (March 2003). The Encyclopedia of Contemporary Christian Music. Hendrickson Publishers. p. 161. ISBN 1-56563-679-1.
- Brothers, Jeffery Lee (2003). Hot Hits: Adult Contemporary Charts 1978-2001. CCM Magazine. pp. 58–59. ISBN 1-4107-3294-0.
