= Somewhere Down the Road =

Somewhere Down the Road may refer to:

- Somewhere Down the Road (album), album by Amy Grant
  - Somewhere Down the Road (Amy Grant song)
- Somewhere Down the Road (Barry Manilow song)
