= Be Still and Know... Hymns & Faith =

Compilation album by Amy Grant
- Released: April 14, 2015
- Genre: Gospel, contemporary Christian music
- Length: 56:34
- Label: Sparrow
- Producer: Marshall Altman; Vince Gill; Brown Bannister

Amy Grant chronology
In Motion: The Remixes (2014)	Be Still and Know... Hymns & Faith (2015)	Tennessee Christmas (2016)

Be Still and Know... Hymns & Faith is a compilation album by Amy Grant. It is mostly made up of tracks from two of her previous albums, Legacy... Hymns and Faith and Rock of Ages... Hymns and Faith. It also features two new songs. Sparrow Records released the album on April 14, 2015. Grant worked with Marshall Altman and Vince Gill in the production of this album.

== Critical reception ==
Professional ratings
Review scores
Source	Rating
365 Days of Inspiring Media	4/5 stars
CCM Magazine	4/5 stars
Cross Rhythms	7/10 squares
The Front Row Report	9/10 stars
Jesus Freak Hideout	4/5 stars
Louder Than the Music	3.5/5 stars
New Release Tuesday	4/5 stars
Worship Leader	4/5 stars

Giving the album four stars for CCM Magazine, Andy Argyrakis writes, "Amy Grant is still attracted to those timeless treasures." Tony Cummings, rating the album seven out of ten at Cross Rhythms, says, "Amy's voice is, of course, faultless and remains one of the most distinctive sounds in modern pop music while the arrangements, veering towards a pop country sound and only occasionally teetering into string-filled MOR, are often imaginative." Awarding the album four stars from New Release Tuesday, Kevin Davis states, "Be Still and Know -- Hymns & Faith is a fresh take on the timeless hymns of the church. Modern arrangements, new choruses and sometimes-complete re-imaginations help these deep and meaningful songs shine." Barry Westman, rating the album four stars at Worship Leader, says, "Be Still and Know contains just the right mix of familiar songs and newer songs of faith, all featuring Amy's familiar, smooth vocals."

Mark D. Geil, writing a four star review for Jesus Freak Hideout, describes, "Be Still and Know showcases some of Amy Grant's finest work while reaffirming her staying power and continued songcraft." Rating the album three and a half stars from Louder Than the Music, Jono Davies says, it is "a real treat." Joshua Andre, awarding the album four stars at 365 Days of Inspiring Media, writes, "Well done Amy for creating an album that reminds us why she is one of the best female singer/songwriters currently". Giving the album nine out of ten stars from The Front Row Report, Reggie Edwards states, "Amy Grant has done what she’s done all along and created an album that will suck you in, get you involved and move you beyond your expectations."

== Commercial performance ==
The album debuted at No. 88 on Top Current Albums, selling 5,000 copies in the first week. It also debuted No. 7 on Christian Albums on its release, where peaked at No. 6 the following year on that chart. The album has sold 27,000 copies in the United States as of August 2016.

== Track listing ==
No.	Title	Writer(s)	Original album	Length
1.	"Power In the Blood"	public domain	new recording	3:51
2.	"Be Still and Know"	Amy Grant	new recording	3:53
3.	"Jesus, Take All of Me (Just As I Am)"	Grant, Brenton Brown, Charlotte Elliott	My Hope: Songs Inspired by the Message and Mission of Billy Graham (2013)	4:27
4.	"Rock of Ages" (with Vince Gill)	Thomas Hastings, Augustus Toplady	Rock of Ages... Hymns and Faith (2005)	3:40
5.	"Carry You"	Grant	Rock of Ages... Hymns and Faith	3:01
6.	"This Is My Father's World"	public domain	Legacy... Hymns and Faith (2002)	3:06
7.	"El Shaddai"	Michael Card, John Thompson	Rock of Ages... Hymns and Faith	4:07
8.	"Joyful, Joyful, We Adore Thee"	Ludwig van Beethoven, Henry van Dyke	Rock of Ages... Hymns and Faith	3:25
9.	"It Is Well with My Soul/The River's Gonna Keep On Rolling"	public domain/Vince Gill	Legacy... Hymns and Faith	4:55
10.	"My Jesus, I Love Thee"	public domain	Legacy... Hymns and Faith	3:34
11.	"Deep As It is Wide" (featuring Sheryl Crow and Eric Paslay)	Eric Paslay	How Mercy Looks from Here (2013)	4:34
12.	"What a Friend We Have in Jesus/Old Rugged Cross/How Great Thou Art"	Charles C. Converse, Joseph Scriven/public domain/public domain, Stuart K. Hine	Legacy... Hymns and Faith	3:31
13.	"'Tis So Sweet To Trust In Jesus"	William J. Kirkpatrick, Louisa M.R. Stead	Our Hymns (1989)	4:04
14.	"Softly and Tenderly"	public domain	Legacy... Hymns and Faith	4:02
15.	"Holy, Holy, Holy"	public domain	Legacy... Hymns and Faith	2:24
Total length:				56:34

== Personnel ==
Music credits (Tracks 1 & 2)

- Amy Grant – lead vocals
- Tony Harrell – Hammond B3 organ
- Richard Bennett – acoustic guitar
- Vince Gill – acoustic guitar, harmony vocals, arrangements (1)
- Tom Bukovac – electric guitars
- Paul Franklin – steel guitar
- Michael Rhodes – bass
- Fred Eltringham – drums, percussion

Music credits (Track 3)

- Amy Grant – lead vocals
- Tim Lauer – acoustic piano, organ
- Marshall Altman – programming, backing vocals
- Matt Duke – acoustic guitar, backing vocals
- Jedd Hughes – electric guitar
- Rob McNelley – electric guitar
- Tony Lucido – bass
- Shannon Forrest – drums
- Jonathan Yudkin – cello

Music credits (Track 13)

- Amy Grant – lead and backing vocals, arrangements
- Brown Bannister – accordion, arrangements
- Evie McPherson – accordion
- Jerry McPherson – dulcimer, violin ukulele, arrangements
- Gary Chapman – bass
- Mark O'Connor – arrangements

== Production ==
Credits (Tracks 1 & 2)

- Vince Gill – producer
- Justin Niebank – engineer, mixing
- Drew Bollman – assistant engineer
- Matt Rausch – assistant engineer
- Hank Williams – mastering

Credits (Track 3)

- Marshall Altman – producer, vocal recording
- Angela Talley – production assistant
- Craig Alvin – recording, mixing
- Chris Wilkinson – assistant engineer
- Shani Ghandi – tracking assistant
- Andrew Mendelson – mastering

Credits (Track 13)

- Brown Bannister – producer
- Jeff Balding – recording, mixing
- Steve Bishir – recording assistant

Additional credits

- Peter York – executive producer
- Brown Bannister – producer (4–10, 12, 14, 15)
- Vince Gill – producer (4–10, 12, 14, 15)
- Marshall Altman – producer (11)
- Becca Wildsmith – artwork, design
- Jim Wright – photography

== Charts ==
Chart (2015)	Peak position
US Christian Albums (Billboard)	6
