= Tennessee Christmas =

Tennessee Christmas may refer to:

== Music ==
=== Albums ===
- Tennessee Christmas, a 2016 album by Amy Grant
- Tennessee Christmas: A Holiday Collection, a 2008 album by Point of Grace
- East Tennessee Christmas, a 1983 album by Chet Atkins

=== Songs ===
- "Tennessee Christmas" a 1983 song by Amy Grant, also re-recorded by Grant in 2016 for her above mentioned album
  - 2008 cover version of Grant's song by Point of Grace from their above mentioned album
- "East Tennessee Christmas" by Chet Atkins from his above mentioned album
