= The Christmas Collection (Amy Grant album) =

Greatest hits album by Amy Grant
- Released: September 30, 2008
- Recorded: July 1983–2008
- Genre: Gospel/Christian, Christmas
- Length: 62:05
- Label: EMI/Sparrow
- Producer: Brown Bannister; Ronn Huff; Michael Omartian; Amy Grant

Amy Grant chronology
Greatest Hits (2007)	The Christmas Collection (2008)	Somewhere Down the Road (2010)

Professional ratings
Review scores
Source	Rating
Allmusic	4.5/5 stars

The Christmas Collection is a Christmas compilation album released by American pop and Christian singer Amy Grant in 2008.

According to Amy Grant's official website,

When you are not only a Grammy Award-winning and multi platinum-selling artist, but also have three best-selling Christmas CDs while selling over six million Christmas albums overall what do you do? If you are Amy Grant, you hand–pick your favorites, record four new songs, and put them all together in one special CD. Such is the case with Grant's THE CHRISTMAS COLLECTION.

== Album information ==
The compilation includes fourteen previously released Christmas songs from Grant's three Christmas studio albums, A Christmas Album, Home for Christmas, and A Christmas to Remember, as well as four new songs.

Of the four new tracks, two are cover songs and two are original compositions. The two covers are "Jingle Bells" and "Count Your Blessings". The latter is taken from the 1954 jukebox musical film White Christmas, and even though Grant has stated she has not watched it yet, she recorded the song for its message. The version of "Jingle Bells" is a cover of the fast-paced arrangement written by Marty Paich and originally recorded by Barbra Streisand. The two new original compositions are "I Need a Silent Night", co-written with constant collaborator Chris Eaton ("Breath of Heaven"); and "Baby, It's Christmas", co-written with husband and fellow singer Vince Gill.

== Track listing ==
The album contains a shortened version of "A Mighty Fortress / Angels We Have Heard on High". The intro of "Sleigh Ride" actually begins over the end of "Baby, It's Christmas", and continues non-stop in a successive flow.

No.	Title	Original album	Length
1.	"Jingle Bells"	new recording	2:05
2.	"It's the Most Wonderful Time of the Year"	Home for Christmas (1992)	2:28
3.	"I Need a Silent Night"	new recording	3:59
4.	"Winter Wonderland"	Home for Christmas	2:18
5.	"Baby, It's Christmas"	new recording	4:01
6.	"Sleigh Ride"	A Christmas Album (1983)	3:24
7.	"Count Your Blessings"	new recording	3:43
8.	"Hark! The Herald Angels Sing"	A Christmas Album	2:56
9.	"Silent Night"	A Christmas to Remember (1999)	3:44
10.	"Breath of Heaven"	Home for Christmas	5:23
11.	"Joy to the World / For Unto Us a Child is Born"	Home for Christmas	2:35
12.	"Grown-Up Christmas List"	Home for Christmas	5:02
13.	"Rockin' Around the Christmas Tree"	Home for Christmas	2:10
14.	"Tennessee Christmas"	A Christmas Album	4:34
15.	"A Christmas to Remember"	A Christmas to Remember	4:21
16.	"O Come All Ye Faithful"	Home for Christmas	3:02
17.	"A Mighty Fortress / Angels We Have Heard on High" (edited version)	A Christmas Album	3:48
18.	"Have Yourself a Merry Little Christmas"	Home for Christmas	2:41
Total length:			62:05

== Personnel ==
Music credits (Tracks 1, 3, 5 & 7)

- Amy Grant – vocals
- Michael Omartian – acoustic piano (3)
- Blair Masters – keyboards (3)
- Pete Wasner – keyboards (3)
- John Hobbs – acoustic piano (5)
- Tom Bukovac – guitars (1, 3)
- Ilya Toshinsky – guitars (1, 3)
- Vince Gill – guitars (5)
- Craig Nelson – bass (1, 5)
- Michael Rhodes – bass (3)
- Paul Leim – drums (1, 5)
- Chad Cromwell – drums (3)
- Jack Gold – arrangements (1)
- Marty Paich – arrangements (1)
- Carl Marsh – orchestral arrangements (1, 7)
- Shane Keister – orchestral arrangements (5)
- Isobel Griffiths – orchestra contractor (1, 5, 7)
- The London Session Orchestra – orchestra (1, 5, 7)
- Mike Casteel – music preparation (1, 5, 7)
- Eberhard Ramm – music preparation (1, 5, 7)
- Tim Davis – backing vocals (1), BGV arrangements (1)
- Lisa Cochran – backing vocals (1)
- Mark Ivey – backing vocals (1)
- Aimee Joy Weimer – backing vocals (1)
- Corrina Gill – Bible verse recitation (3)

== Production ==
- Michael Blanton – executive producer
- Amy Grant – executive producer, co-producer (1, 3, 5, 7)
- Brown Bannister – producer (1–8, 10–14, 16–18)
- Ronn Huff – co-producer (2, 11)
- Michael Omartian – producer (9, 15)
- Doug Sax – mastering
- Sangwook Nam – mastering assistant
- Mastered at The Mastering Lab (Ojai, California).
- Mandy Arola – A&R administration
- Jan Cook – creative director
- Tim Frank – art direction
- Roy Roper – design
- Kristin Barlowe – photography
- Trish Townsend – stylist
- Blanton Harrell Cooke & Corzine – management

Production and Technical credits (Tracks 1, 3, 5 & 7)

- Steve Bishir – recording, mixing, orchestra recording
- Matt Coles – recording assistant, mix assistant
- Brown Bannister – additional engineer
- Billy Whittington – additional engineer
- Traci Sterling Bishir – production manager
- Recorded at The Sound Kitchen (Franklin, Tennessee) and Townsend Sound Studios (Nashville, Tennessee).
- Orchestra recorded at Abbey Road Studio One (London, UK).

== Charts ==
=== Weekly charts ===
Year	Chart	Position
2008	The Billboard 200	41
2008	Billboard Comprehensive Albums	47
2008	Top Holiday Albums	5
2008	Top Christian Albums	2
2008	Top Christian and Gospel Albums	2

=== End of year charts ===
Year	Chart	Position
2009	Billboard Top Christian Albums	16
