= In Motion: The Remixes =

Remix album by Amy Grant
- Released: August 19, 2014
- Recorded: 1985–2010, 2014
- Genre: CCM, gospel, pop, dance, house music
- Length: 49:05
- Label: Capitol CMG, Sparrow, Amy Grant Productions

Amy Grant chronology
| How Mercy Looks from Here (2013) | In Motion: The Remixes (2014) | Be Still and Know... Hymns & Faith (2015) |

Professional ratings
Review scores
| Source | Rating |
|---|---|
| AllMusic | 3.5/5 stars |
| Cross Rhythms | 9/10 stars |
| Jesus Freak Hideout | 2/5 stars |

In Motion: The Remixes is the first official remix album by CCM recording artist Amy Grant. The album was released on August 19, 2014, by Capitol CMG and Sparrow Records. It contains dance remixes of seven best known songs from Grant, plus two remixes of "Stay for Awhile", a bonus track radio edit remix of "Out in the Open" and a medley mega mix all done by various DJs and engineers. "Baby Baby (2014)" featuring Dave Audé was released as the first single and reached number 3 on the Billboard Dance Club Songs chart. Grant's first appearance on the dance chart was the "Baby Baby" remixes during the Heart in Motion period 23 years ago, peaking at number 23. With the exceptions of "Out in the Open" and the "Mega Mix", each song has their own remix EPs that were released the following month. The album debuted and peaked at number 110 on the Top 200 Albums chart, number 8 on the Top Christian Albums chart, and number 5 on the Top Dance/Electronic Albums chart.

== Track listing ==
Tracks for the Digital Edition

| No. | Title | Writer(s) | Original album | Length |
|---|---|---|---|---|
| 1. | "That's What Love is For" (Radio Edit featuring Chris Cox) | Amy Grant, Michael Omartian, Mark Mueller | Heart in Motion (1991) | 3:12 |
| 2. | "Stay for Awhile" (Radio Edit featuring Tony Moran, Warren Rigg) | A. Grant, Michael W. Smith, Wayne Kirkpatrick | The Collection (1986) | 4:08 |
| 3. | "You're Not Alone" (Radio Edit featuring Guy Scheiman) | Simon Climie, Rob Fisher, Dennis Morgan | Heart in Motion | 3:46 |
| 4. | "Every Heartbeat" (Radio Edit featuring Moto Blanco) | A. Grant, W. Kirkpatrick, Charlie Peacock | Heart in Motion | 3:24 |
| 5. | "Better Than a Hallelujah" (Gospel Radio edit featuring Mark Picchiotti) | Sarah Hart, Chapin Hartman | Somewhere Down the Road (2010) | 3:47 |
| 6. | "Find a Way" (Big Room Radio Edit featuring Ralphi Rosario) | A. Grant, M. W. Smith | Unguarded (1985) | 3:37 |
| 7. | "Baby Baby" (Radio Edit featuring Dave Audé) | A. Grant, Keith Thomas | Heart in Motion | 3:57 |
| 8. | "Say Once More" (Radio Edit featuring Hex Hector) | A. Grant, Gardner Cole | Lead Me On (1988) | 3:32 |
| 9. | "Out in the Open" (Radio Edit/Bonus Mix featuring 7th Heaven) | A. Grant, Chris Eaton | Simple Things (2003) | 4:04 |
| 10. | "Stay for Awhile" (Destination Mixshow Edit/Bonus Mix featuring Tony Moran) | A. Grant, M. W. Smith, W. Kirkpatrick | The Collection | 6:45 |
| 11. | "Mega Mix" (featuring DJ Andy 7th Heaven) | A. Grant, M. W. Smith, W. Kirkpatrick, K. Thomas, G. Cole, S. Hart, C. Hartman, M. Omartian, M. Mueller, S. Climie, R. Fisher, D. Morgan, C. Peacock | Previously unreleased bonus mix | 8:49 |

== Critical reception ==
Matt Collar of AllMusic said the remix album "showcases remixed versions of many of the contemporary Christian pop vocalist's best-loved songs" and "are high-energy cuts that retain all of Grant's bright, passionate pop style, and they're perfectly suited for any club- or dance-oriented situation."

At Cross Rhythms, Joy Attmore says that In Motion... has "a seamless flow and steady pace of energy between each track which make this a very enjoyable listen, hard to sit still to or refrain from singing along to. For a generation that may not be as well versed in Grant's discography, today's recording technology has brought a new sheen to some of Nashville's most memorable CCM. So expect to hear cuts from this set even in the lands of glow stick-waving and raving beats."

Mark D. Geil of Jesus Freak Hideaway has a different opinion about In Motion... he says that the album's worst moments, the lyrics and the music become a complete mismatch. There are two (yes, two) remixes of "Stay for Awhile," a sweet song about catching up with an old friend better suited for a lazy summer day than a club. "Say Once More" somehow strips the earnestness from Grant's vocal. And "Better than a Hallelujah" might be a leader among songs most ill-suited for a remix.

== Charts ==
| Chart (2014) | Peak position |
|---|---|
| US Top 200 Albums (Billboard) | 110 |
| US Top Christian Albums (Billboard) | 8 |
| US Top Dance/Electronic Albums (Billboard) | 5 |

Radio singles
| Year | Single | Position |
|---|---|---|
| 2014 | "Baby Baby (2014)" | 3 |
| 2014 | "Every Heartbeat (2014)" | 13 |
