= The Me That Remains =

Studio album by Amy Grant
- Released: May 8, 2026
- Recorded: 2025
- Genre: Folk pop
- Length: 39:22
- Label: Thirty Tigers
- Producer: Mac McAnally

Amy Grant chronology
Tennessee Christmas (2016)	The Me That Remains (2026)

Singles from The Me That Remains
- 1. "The 6th of January (Yasgur's Farm)" Released: January 6, 2026

The Me That Remains is the twentieth studio album by the American singer Amy Grant. It was released on May 8, 2026, through Thirty Tigers, to CD, LP, digital download, and streaming formats. The album was produced by Mac McAnally and features guest appearances from Ruby Amanfu, Vince Gill, Sarah Cannon, and Corrina Gill. The Me That Remains was supported by the release of one single, "The 6th of January (Yasgur's Farm)", and two promotional singles, "The Me That Remains" and "How Do We Get There From Here".

== Background ==
The Me That Remains is Grant's first studio album of completely original material in over a decade; her previous effort, How Mercy Looks from Here, was released in 2013. The Me That Remains is also her first release made through Thirty Tigers, as well as her first release through a secular record label, without co-distribution from a Christian label, a choice which she made in an attempt to reach a broader audience. In June 2020, Grant had discovered that she was suffering from partial anomalous pulmonary, a birth defect which results in poor circulation of blood in the heart. To resolve the issue, she had undergone open-heart surgery. In July 2022, she became injured in a bicycling accident. The accident left her hospitalized and unconscious. The two events have both acted as inspiration throughout the album's lyrics.

== Release and promotion ==
Grant announced through TikTok the upcoming release of a new single, an announcement which "broke years of silence" in her career. On January 6, 2026, the song, "The 6th of January (Yasgur's Farm)", was released as the lead single from The Me That Remains. The song was promoted to Americana and public radio along with the release of a music video, which was released to YouTube. With the release of "The 6th of January (Yasgur's Farm)", it was announced that Grant was anticipating the release of a forthcoming record later that year; however, further details had not yet been revealed. The song, referencing the January 6 United States Capitol attack as well as the Woodstock music festival, "[asks] how we sit with the unrest of the world without rushing to conclusions about how to fix it". Grant spoke on the song's lyrical meaning, saying:

We operate in the world around us and sometimes neglect the power of what we have in our choices. The song observes life and the unrest many of us feel, while knowing we are shaping the world around us daily. Maybe life and problem solving is more of a 'we' than 'me' conversation. If we can choose to look through a lens other than our own, maybe there is hope to come together and find a way through the unrest.

On February 20, 2026, the album's title track, "The Me That Remains", was released as the first promotional single from the album. With the song's release, the title and release date of the upcoming album were announced, as well as being made available for pre-order. The song was promoted with the release of a music video, which was uploaded to YouTube. On March 27, 2026, following an announcement of its release, "How Do We Get There From Here" was released as the album's second promotional single and final predecessor. It was intentionally released on the third anniversary of the Covenant school shooting, in which a close friend of Grant's had died. The track "wrestles with grief, accountability, and the urgent question of how to move forward". The song was promoted with the release of a music video, which was uploaded to YouTube.

In promotion of The Me That Remains, Grant headlined at the Ryman Auditorium on May 8, 2026, to premiere the album's release. Upon the album's release, orange and turquoise-colored vinyls were released to independent record stores, and a CD with bonus tracks was released exclusively to Amazon. The album's release was supported with the opening of a limited-time exhibit, themed around Grant and The Me That Remains, at the Museum of Christian and Gospel Music in Nashville, Tennessee.

== Composition ==
=== Development ===
Grant began writing and recording the tracks before she had obtained a record deal with Thirty Tigers. She had begun writing in the summer of 2023 as a form of "therapy process" to help herself recover from the prior injuries and health issues. The tracks were initially written as poetry before she had paired them to melody; Grant experienced difficulty in writing music to accompany the lyrics due to experiencing "pretty substantial short-term memory issues", but in retrospect mused that, "in a beautiful way", it "created [her] path". In January 2025, she began recording material, and, after realizing that it "was fun", decided to record a full album. Six months subsequent to the album's completion, she sought for a label to release it, and settled upon Thirty Tigers, because she believed that their focus was "bringing together people through the arts".

=== Lyrics and meaning ===
The album's lyrical content contains Grant's "Eulogy to a Younger Me", and references to Grant's prior injuries and health issues. Several songs have political backgrounds, most notably the tracks "How Do We Get There From Here?" and "The 6th of January (Yasgur's Farm)". Grant has characterized the project as an effort to "honor and release" her past self. Lauryn Sink of Music Row observed that the album "reflects on healing, connection, endurance and grace", while USA Today likened its style to that of Joni Mitchell. Rather than emphasizing melody and production, The Me That Remains sees Grant leaning more into lyrics and songwriting than she has done in previous works. Shore Fire Media wrote that the lyrical themes of the album's title track, the "emotional centerpiece" of the album, "[reflect] directly on the profound health challenges Grant has faced in recent years, including open heart surgery and a life-altering bike accident that resulted in a traumatic brain injury". Grant spoke on album's meaning, explaining:

The older I get, the more aware I am that we all live long enough to see versions of ourselves pass away. Given time to process decades of a life – one that was both exciting and difficult – I've needed to remember and release the younger Amy Grant. There are fewer bells and whistles around this deeper work now, but life's discoveries and mysteries are even more compelling to me. I'm thankful for each day and curious to find connection and purpose, and how the Love that made us all will emerge and express itself in and through me today.

=== Style and production ===
McAnally's production was intentionally restrained to emphasize its lyrics. The album's arrangements consists primarily of acoustic instruments, namely piano, strumstick, and guitar, to maintain an intimate sound. PopMatters praised the "pristine yet warm production, full of strummed guitars". The Me That Remains demonstrates the genre of folk-pop. Writing for the Music Row, Robert K. Oermann made note of Grant's "warm soprano", which is "framed by gentle piano notes and soft organ sighs".

== Reception ==
Professional ratings
Review scores
Source	Rating
Hallels	5/5 stars
Jesus Freak Hideout	4/5 stars
Jubilee Cast	5/5 stars
Rolling Stone Germany	4/5 stars
Spectrum Culture	68%

=== Critical ===
The Me That Remains received positive reception from critics, many of whom praised its lyrical style and restrained sound. Writing for Jesus Freak Hideout, Noah Schmidt rated the album 4-out-of-5, praising its "greatest musical variety". He wrote that Grant's experience in the music industry provides "wisdom and an approach that only comes from time and experience". Schmidt also went on to praise the "freshness and perspective" contained in the album, describing it as "enjoyable on the surface while also carrying great depth". In agreement with the rating was Max Gösche of Rolling Stone Germany. He praised the "calmness with which Grant weaves her message of peace through layers of history".

In a 5-out-of-5 score for Jubilee Cast, Timothy Yap observed that Grant "no longer sings with the pristine brightness of her younger years", although claimed that The Me That Remains is "immeasurably better for it". He praised "the slight huskiness and fragility in her voice", which "[gives] these songs emotional gravity", and enjoyed the "reflective depth that only suffering and time can produce". Writing for Spectrum Culture, Adam Newton rated the album 68%. He wrote that Grant has the "ability to pen thoughtful lyrics borne of the wisdom that comes with age", and praised her "heartfelt attempts to sing her truth". He made note of the album's tendency to lean towards "robust poetry with oblique references to her Christian faith", and concluded in describing it as "a good album filled with authentic Amy Grant music".

Robert K. Oermann named the song "The Me That Remains" the disc of the day in his Disclaimer column for MusicRow, writing that Grant's "warm soprano is framed by gentle piano notes and soft organ sighs on the touching inspirational ballad", and praising the track as "beautifully done". Additionally, Billboard named "How Do We Get There From Here" as one the top-6 new Country songs to listen to on March 30, 2026. Jessica Nicholson wrote that the song is a "powerful, vulnerable collaboration, one steeped in reflection, grief and concern", and praising the album as a "collection of some of her most unfiltered, powerfully contemplative songs to date".

NPR included "The 6th of January (Yasgur's Farm)" as the first song in its mid-year list of No. 1 songs of 2026. Lars Gotrich wrote, "In a warm arrangement that foregrounds Grant's quietly resilient voice, she nods lyrically to Joni Mitchell, John Lennon and Marvin Gaye, at first seeming to contrast the lost idealism of '60s with the violence of the Jan. 6, 2021, Capitol riot. Grant, here treating Sandy Emory Lawrence's songwriting with the tenderness needed, doesn't merely sing a protest song, but asks us to participate."

=== Commercial ===
In the United States, The Me That Remains debuted on the Billboard Top Album Sales chart at number 31. In the United Kingdom, it debuted at numbers 25 and 12 on the Official Charts Company's Americana Albums and Christian & Gospel Albums charts, respectively.

=== Accolades ===
Year	Organization	Category	Result	Ref.
2026	American Illustration	American Illustration Winners Collection	Won	

== Track listing ==
No.	Title	Writer(s)	Length
1.	"The 6th of January (Yasgur's Farm)"	Sandy Emory Lawrence	4:10
2.	"How Do We Get There from Here" (featuring Ruby Amanfu)	Amy Grant; Ruby Amanfu	4:28
3.	"Please Don't Make Me Beg"	Grant; Jon Foreman	4:35
4.	"The Saint"	Grant; Michael W. Smith	3:20
5.	"Beautiful Lone Companion"	Grant; Mike Reid	4:44
6.	"The Me That Remains"	Grant; Mac McAnally	3:45
7.	"'Til We Get It Right"	McAnally; Caroline Jones	3:18
8.	"(Nothing Like a) Sunny Day"	McAnally	3:34
9.	"Friend Like You" (with Vince Gill)	Grant; Chris Eaton	4:00
10.	"The Other Side of Goodbye" (with Sarah Cannon and Corrina Gill)	Grant; Tom Douglas	3:32
Total length:			39:26

Deluxe edition
No.	Title	Length
11.	"Please Don't Make Me Beg" (featuring Jon Foreman)	4:37
12.	"The 6th of January (Yasgur's Farm)" (Driving Home Mix)	4:13
13.	"Beautiful Lone Companion" (Mandolin Choir Mix)	4:46
14.	"The Saint" (Live)	3:29
15.	"The Me That Remains" (Live)	3:47
16.	"'Til We Get It Right" (Live)	3:28
17.	"(Nothing Like a) Sunny Day" (Live)	3:40

== Personnel ==
Credits are adapted from Tidal.

- Amy Grant – lead vocals
- Mac McAnally – production
- Chris Stone – recording, mixing
- Sandy Emory Lawrence – writer (1)
- Ruby Amanfu – lead vocals (2)
- Vince Gill – lead vocals (9)
- Sarah Cannon – background vocals (10)
- Corinna Gill – background vocals (10)

== Charts ==
Chart performance for The Me That Remains
Chart (2026)	Peak position
UK Americana Albums (Official Charts)	25
UK Christian & Gospel Albums (Official Charts)	12
US Top Album Sales (Billboard)	31

== Release history ==
Release history and formats for The Me That Remains
Region	Date	Format(s)	Label(s)	Ref.
Various	May 8, 2026	CD; LP; casette tape; digital download; streaming	Thirty Tigers	
