= El Shaddai (song) =

Single by Amy Grant

from the album Age to Age
- Released: 1982
- Genre: Contemporary Christian
- Length: 4:08
- Label: Myrrh
- Songwriters: Michael Card, John Thompson
- Producer: Brown Bannister

Amy Grant singles chronology
"Sing Your Praise to the Lord" (1982)	"El Shaddai" (1982)	"In a Little While" (1982)

Audio sample
- "El Shaddai": file; help

"El Shaddai" (sometimes styled "El-Shaddai") is a contemporary Christian music song. It was written by Michael Card and John Thompson, using direct quotes from scripture as their inspiration, and recorded by Card on his 1981 debut album, Legacy. However, the best known version of the song was by singer Amy Grant, whose rendition was recorded in 1982 on her platinum-certified album Age to Age.

The title comes from a Judaic name of God, usually translated as "God Almighty" (see El Shaddai). Approximately half the lyrics of the chorus are in the Hebrew language, which is rather unusual for a contemporary Christian song. The recording was in the style of a performance ballad, but the song was subsequently published in some hymnbooks and is occasionally sung congregationally.

The song was a hit single for Grant, reaching the top ten of the Christian radio chart. "El Shaddai" won the "Dove Award for Song of the Year" and Card won "Songwriter of the Year" at the 1983 GMA Dove Awards. It was also named one of the "Songs of the Century" by the RIAA in 2001.

Grant has recorded at least three different studio versions and one partial version:

- The original Age to Age version is primarily performed on piano, with harp and string accompaniment. Drums do not appear in this version until the climactic third chorus. This is the version used on most compilations.
  - Grant also incorporated a portion of the song (similar to the Age to Age rendition, but slightly more uptempo) into her Ageless Medley promo release. The medley was named for the Age to Age album, which in turn took its name from the lyrics of "El Shaddai".
- Before releasing her album Behind the Eyes in 1997, Grant released a CD single of "Takes a Little Time"; the B-side was a newly recorded version of "El Shaddai". This version is notable for the prominent violin accompaniment used throughout the recording. This recording has never been made available on any album or compilation.
- Grant recorded another new version of the song for her 2005 album Rock of Ages...Hymns and Faith. This version is more in a light pop style, with acoustic guitar and drums throughout, and features harmony vocals and acoustic guitar solo by Grant's husband, Vince Gill. This version is included in the WOW Worship: Aqua compilation, and Grant's 2015 compilation album Be Still and Know... Hymns & Faith.

"El Shaddai" has been covered by many contemporary Christian and gospel recording artists, including Pat Boone, Winans Phase 2, and Eden's Bridge. Michael Card re-recorded the song for his 1994 compilation, Joy in the Journey. There also exist translated versions which combine Hebrew with other languages.

== Lyrics ==
Michael Card's original lyrics included a line "Though the Jews just couldn't see/ What Messiah ought to be"; Amy Grant changed this to "Though the people couldn't see/ What Messiah ought to be." Most covers incorporate Grant's change, and even Card uses "though the people failed to see...".

=== Translation of Hebrew lyrics ===
El Shaddai (אל שׁדי) is most often translated as "God Almighty".

El-Elyon na Adonai (אל עליון נא אדני) is a combination of two names for God, meaning "God Most High, please my Lord". (The 'ai' in 'Adonai' is a possessive.) Na (נא) is a particle of entreaty, translated "please" or "I/we beseech thee", or left untranslated.

Erkamka na Adonai is based on Psalm 18:1 (except for the "na," which is added) Erḥamkha (ארחמך) Adonai, "I love you, my Lord." Psalm 18:1 is the only place that the Hebrew Bible uses this verb for love in the Qal stem; this is normally an Aramaic usage. Hebrew uses this verb in the Pi'el stem in the context of compassion rather than love.

For more information on the translation, see Names of God in Judaism, El Shaddai, El (god), and Elyon.

== Charts ==
Year	Single	Chart	Position
1982	"El Shaddai"	CCM Hot Hits	2

== See also ==
- Dove Award for Song of the Year
- Dove Award for Songwriter of the Year
