= Time Again... Amy Grant Live =

Live album by Amy Grant
- Released: September 26, 2006
- Recorded: April 11–12, 2006
- Venue: Bass Hall, Fort Worth, Texas
- Genre: Gospel
- Length: 74:53
- Label: Word
- Producer: Steve Bishir; Amy Grant; Brown Bannister

Amy Grant chronology
Rock of Ages... Hymns and Faith (2005)	Time Again... Amy Grant Live (2006)	Greatest Hits (2007)

Professional ratings
Review scores
Source	Rating
Allmusic	3.5/5 stars
Jesus Freak Hideout	4.5/5 stars

Time Again... Amy Grant Live is a live album by Christian music singer-songwriter Amy Grant, released on September 26, 2006 (see 2006 in music).

Time Again is Grant's first live album since the twin 1981 releases In Concert and In Concert Volume Two. This performance was recorded in the same city (Ft. Worth, Texas) as was the singer's first paid performance back in 1978. This also features an updated version of "In a Little While" from her 1982 album Age to Age.

Though originally released by Warner/Word Records, the album was re-released by EMI Records under exclusive license from Amy Grant Productions to Sparrow Records on March 18, 2014.

== Track listing ==
No.	Title	Writer(s)	Length
1.	"Lead Me On"	Amy Grant; Michael W. Smith; Wayne Kirkpatrick	6:01
2.	"Good for Me"	Grant; Jay Gruska; Kirkpatrick; Tom Snow	3:57
3.	"Stay for Awhile"	Grant; M.W. Smith; Kirkpatrick	3:39
4.	"Takes a Little Time"	Grant; Kirkpatrick	4:27
5.	"Simple Things"	Grant; Keith Thomas; Will Owsley; Dillon O'Brian	4:11
6.	"Saved by Love"	Grant; Justin Peters; Chris Smith	4:48
7.	"Out in the Open"	Grant; Chris Eaton	5:16
8.	"Ask Me"	Grant; Tom Hemby	4:11
9.	"After the Fire"	Grant	3:31
10.	"In a Little While"	Grant; Brown Bannister; Gary Chapman; Shane Keister	3:37
11.	"Thy Word"	Grant; M.W. Smith	3:18
12.	"Oh How the Years Go By"	Simon Climie; Will Jennings	4:35
13.	"Baby Baby"	Grant; Thomas	4:00
14.	"Eye to Eye"	Grant; Thomas	4:05
15.	"Every Heartbeat"	Grant; Charlie Peacock; Kirkpatrick	3:21
16.	"Believe (Theme from Three Wishes)"	Grant; Owsley; O'Brian; Bob Thiele Jr.	2:06
17.	"I Will Remember You"	Grant; Chapman; Thomas	5:42
18.	"In a Little While" (new studio version)	Grant; Bannister; Chapman; Shane Keister	4:08
Total length:			74:53

Bonus DVD
No.	Title	Writer(s)	Length
1.	"Stay for Awhile"	Grant; M.W. Smith; Kirkpatrick	3:43
2.	"Takes a Little Time"	Grant; Kirkpatrick	4:30
3.	"Thy Word"	Grant; M.W. Smith	2:58
4.	"Lucky One"	Grant; Thomas	3:50
Total length:			15:01

== Personnel ==
Live tracks

- Amy Grant – lead vocals, acoustic guitar
- Jonathan Hamby – keyboards, acoustic piano, bass vocals
- Gene Miller – acoustic guitar, electric guitars, vocals
- Will Owsley – electric guitars, alto vocals
- Kim Keyes – electric guitars, percussion, vocals
- Millard Powers – bass, vocals
- Jim Bogios – drums, vocals

"In a Little While" (new studio version)

- Amy Grant – lead vocals
- Tim Akers – keyboards, acoustic piano
- Scott Denté – acoustic guitar
- Tommy Sims – acoustic guitar, bass, arrangements
- Chad Cromwell – drums
- Javier Solis – percussion
- David Angell – strings
- Kirsten Cassel – strings
- David Davidson – strings
- Jim Grosjean – strings
- Nirva Dorsaint – backing vocals
- Missi Hale – backing vocals
- Nikki Leonti – backing vocals

== Production ==
- Michael Blanton – executive producer
- Jennifer Cooke – executive producer
- Amy Grant – producer
- Steve Bishir – producer, recording, mixing
- Dan Spooner – recording and technical assistant
- Aaron Sternke – digital editing
- Steve Hall – mastering at Future Disc (Hollywood, California)
- Traci Sterling Bishir – production manager
- Katherine Petillo – creative director
- Bert Sumner – design
- Ed James – set design
- Michael Gomez – photography
- Sheila Davis Curtis – hair stylist, make-up
- Blanton Harrell Cooke & Corzine – management

DVD

- Ken Carpenter – film producer, director
- Rod Carpenter – film producer
- David Watson – editing

In a Little While" (new studio version)

- Brown Bannister – producer
- Steve Bishir – recording, mixing
- Travis Brigman – recording assistant, mix assistant
- Daewoo Kim – string recording
- Recorded at Platinum Lab (Nashville, Tennessee)
- Strings recorded at Little Big Studio (Nashville, Tennessee)
- Mixed at Oxford Sound (Nashville, Tennessee)

== Charts ==
=== Weekly charts ===
Year	Chart	Position
2006	Billboard 200	87
2006	Top Christian Albums	6

== Awards ==
In 2007, the album won a Dove Award for Long Form Music Video of the Year at the 38th GMA Dove Awards.
