= What a Friend We Have in Jesus =

Song
- Published: lyrics published 1865 by H. L. Hastings lyrics with tune published 1870 by Oliver Ditson & Co.
- Genre: Hymn
- Composer: Charles C. Converse (1868)
- Lyricist: Joseph M. Scriven (1855)

"What a Friend We Have in Jesus" is a Christian hymn originally written by preacher Joseph M. Scriven as a poem in 1855 to comfort his mother, who was living in Ireland while he was in Canada. Scriven originally published the poem anonymously, and only received full credit for it in the 1880s. The tune to the hymn was composed by Charles Crozat Converse in 1868.

The hymn also has many versions with different lyrics in multiple languages. The Handbook to the Lutheran Hymnal notes, "In spite of the fact that this hymn, with its tune, has been criticized as being too much on the order of the sentimental gospel type, its popularity remains strong, and the hymn retains a place in modern hymnals." In some settings, the lyrics have been matched to other tunes such as the Welsh "Calon Lân" (originally wedded to the Welsh poem translated as "A Pure Heart").

"What a Friend We Have In Jesus"
Performed by the Onward Brass Band

== Renditions ==
- Washington Phillips, as "Jesus Is My Friend" (1928, Columbia Records)
- Bing Crosby (1951, Beloved Hymns)
- Tennessee Ernie Ford (1958, Nearer the Cross, Capitol Records)
- Rosemary Clooney (1959, Hymns from the Heart, MGM Records)
- The Stanley Brothers (1960)
- Reno & Smiley and the Tennessee Cut-Ups (1963)
- Ella Fitzgerald with the Ralph Carmichael Choir (1967, Brighten the Corner)
- Thurl Ravenscroft (1970, Great Hymns In Story and Song)
- Aretha Franklin (1972, Amazing Grace)
- Alan Price (1973, O Lucky Man! as "Changes")
- Mahalia Jackson Gospels, Spirituals, and Hymns.
- Ike & Tina Turner (1974, The Gospel According to Ike & Tina)
- Lester Flatt & and the Nashville Grass (1975), the LP Flatt Gospel. Also performed by Flatt & Scruggs while Flatt and Earl Scruggs played together.
- Bill Monroe (Bear Family (German) BCD-16639 My Last Days On Earth 1981-1994
- Wade and Julia Mainer with unknown musicians (1989)
- Glen Campbell (1989, Favorite Hymns)
- Driving Miss Daisy (1989) sung at Little Friendship Baptist Church in Atlanta, Georgia
- The John Tesh Project (2000, Pure Hymns)
- Amy Grant recorded it as part of the medley "What a Friend We Have in Jesus/Old Rugged Cross/How Great Thou Art" on her 2002 studio album Legacy... Hymns and Faith, and later included on her 2015 compilation album Be Still and Know... Hymns & Faith.
- Alan Jackson (2006, Precious Memories)
- Brad Paisley (2008, Play)
- Ronnie Milsap (2009, Then Sings My Soul)
- Hugh Laurie (2013, Didn't It Rain as "Changes" by Alan Price)
- Monty Alexander (2013, Uplift 2)
- Perkins Twins (2018)
- William Bolcom composed a setting of the hymn in 1979.

=== In Africa ===
In East Africa, the hymn's title is translated as "Yesu Kwetu ni Rafiki" in Swahili.

In Kimeru, a local dialect in Kenya, the song was translated to Jesu ni Mucore wetu and is hymn no 59 in the iuku ria ndwimbo. In Kikuyu, the hymn was translated to: Ti itheru twi Murata.

In Kalenjin hymns commonly known as Tienwogik Che Kilosune Jehovah, the song is number 34, Choruenyu Kiptaiyat Jesu.

In Basaa, a local language in Cameroon, the hymn is translated as "Wanda Djem Djol Die Le Yesu".

In the Dholuo hymns of Kenya, it is translated as "Yesu Kristo en Osiepwa."

=== In Asia ===
In Japan, the hymn's title was originally translated as "Itsukushimi Fukaki" (いつくしみ深き; lit. "Merciful"), by which it is best known. In 1910, Daisui Sugitani rewrote the lyrics in Japanese and changed the title to "Hoshi no Yo" (星の界; lit. "World of Stars"). Another version was written by Ryūkō Kawaji with the title "Hoshi no Sekai" (星の世界; lit. "World of Stars"). It is also known by the title "Tsumitoga o Ninou" (つみとがをにのう; lit. "To Bear Sin"). The hymn is popular at wedding ceremonies in Japan. Both hymn instrumentals of "Hoshi no Sekai" and "Itsukushimi Fukaki" are used as background music for Key's 2004 visual novel Planetarian: The Reverie of a Little Planet, arranged by Magome Togoshi. "Hoshi no Sekai" was also included in Planetarian's anime adaptaitons, arranged by Shinji Orito. The hymn was used as a recurring motif in the 2006 film Memories of Matsuko. The melody also appears as an instrumental during certain episodes of the 2021 anime series Taisho Otome Fairy Tale.

In Indonesia, the hymn is known as "Yesus Kawan yang Sejati" and is sung in Indonesian or Batak (the indigenous language of North Sumatra) in Manado, Maluccan, and Protestant churches (around 6% of the population). Statistically, most Indonesians are Muslim (around 76%), but native religion elements have up to 90% of the total population and consequently the hymn is widely known only among musicians, scholars, and Indonesia's Christian community. Prior to when Suharto seized power in 1967, though, the same music was adopted for a popular patriotic song titled "Ibu Pertiwi".

In Hindi, the hymn is a very important song and is sung as "Yeshu kaisa dost pyara". In Marathi, the hymn has been translated as "Kon Mitra Yeshuwani" By Mary Bessel. The song is common during solemn services (Passion week and burial). In Malayalam, the hymn as "Enthu Nallore sakhi Yesu" is sung to comfort and as an invitation to Christ. This hymn had been translated into Telugu and is sung during occasions as a song of comfort and solace. It is translated as "Preethi gala mana Yesu" and is listed in the Andhra Kraisthava Keerthanalu (Andhra Christian hymnals) as hymn No. 407.

In India, the hymn sung in Konkani, "Dulob Jezu", was translated by Felix Paul Noronha of Mangalore.

In South Korea, the hymn is translated as the title of "The Savior who took our burden of sins". The hymn was first introduced to South Korea by Oriental Mission Society, which is the previous organization of Korea Evangelical Holiness Church in 1919. This hymn has been sung by the church of evangelical denomination in common for a century. The remake version has been also made through contemporary Christian music.

== Parodies and homages ==
Parody versions have included the First World War soldiers' song "When this lousy war is over", the IWW song "Dump the Bosses off your Back", and the Pete Seeger anti-war song "What a Friend We Have in Congress".

This tune forms as the basis of the Indonesian patriotic song "Ibu Pertiwi" which was composed in 1908 by Kamsidi Samsuddin. It was also used as the theme song of 2019 film adaptation of This Earth of Mankind, performed by Iwan Fals, Once and Fiersa Besari.

Alan Price used the melody as the basis of his song "Changes," from the 1973 film O Lucky Man! and its soundtrack album, which was reused in a Volkswagen commercial of the same name with Paula Hamilton in the 1980s. In 1989, the song reached number 54 on the UK charts and number 29 on the German charts. In 2013, Hugh Laurie covered the song on his album Didn't It Rain.

== Published versions ==
- Rise Up Singing, page 98
- The Lutheran Hymnal, hymn #457
