= Better Than a Hallelujah =

Single by Amy Grant

from the album Somewhere Down the Road
- Released: 2010
- Studio: Glomo Studios (Franklin, TN); The House (Nashville, TN)
- Genre: CCM, Adult Contemporary, Pop
- Length: 3:44
- Label: EMI/Sparrow
- Songwriter(s): Sarah Hart; Chapin Hartford
- Producer(s): Dan Muckala

Amy Grant singles chronology
"She Colors My Day" (2009)	"Better Than a Hallelujah" (2010)	"Don't Try So Hard" (2013)

Music video
- "Better Than a Hallelujah" on YouTube

"Better Than a Hallelujah" is a digital MP3 single released in 2010 (see 2010 in music) to promote Amy Grant's album Somewhere Down the Road, which was also released in 2010. The single for "Better Than a Hallelujah" was released to radio for airplay and additionally released commercially as a digital MP3, as the same version to appear on the album. The radio single reached number 8 on the Christian charts.

Although not included on the single release, an "Ambient Mix" of the song was released digitally as a bonus track for the album Somewhere Down the Road on iTunes and other services.

In early 2011, "Better Than a Hallelujah" received a Grammy nomination for Best Gospel Song for songwriters Sarah Hart and Chapin Hartford. However, it lost to "It's What I Do," written by Jerry Peters and Kirk Whalum and recorded by Whalum and Lalah Hathaway. The song also received a nomination for a Dove Award for Short Form Music Video of the Year at the 42nd GMA Dove Awards.

== Music video ==
The music video was produced by Kip Kubin to promote the single. It shows the story of an old man who discovers an old letter from his girlfriend, and goes back to her house to find that another family lives there. He goes to public records to find her location at a cemetery. At the grave, he opens the letter to find that she wrote that he was going to be a father, and drops it in the wind. He remembers that in 1952 he left his girlfriend, flew to Hawaii and cheated on her with another woman in Hawaii, never going back again to his girlfriend.

The girlfriend he left behind sent him a letter saying she is pregnant, but he never learned this, having never opened the envelope until he rediscovered it in his box so many years later. Upon finding her grave he opens the letter to find what she wrote "Dear Johnny, you are going to be a father." And standing at the grave he reads - "Judith Hanson and Infant." His sorrow and regret for cheating and never clearing it up all those years, and the loss of his love and his own child... we are left thinking about what this is, and the song tells us that it is this honest grief over what we have done that God honors, when we truly come to our senses and face our bad actions... and repent.

The video proved to be a moving topic for netizens in China, according to the chinaSMACK blog.

== Track listing ==
2010 Digital Single

1. "Better Than a Hallelujah" - 3:44

Remix EP released in 2014 in support of In Motion: The Remixes

1. "Better Than a Hallelujah" (featuring Mark Picchiotti) [Gospel Radio Edit] - 3:47
2. "Better Than a Hallelujah" (featuring Mark Picchiotti) [Gospel Club Mix] - 7:04
3. "Better Than a Hallelujah" (featuring Mark Picchiotti) [Revival Dub] - 7:17

Although there was an ambient mix (3:34) made of the song, it was not available on the single but was later released in 2011 as a track on the expanded edition of the album Somewhere Down the Road.

Official versions

- Album Version - 3:44
- Mark Picchiotti Gospel Club Mix - 7:07
- Mark Picchiotti Gospel Radio Edit - 3:47
- Mark Picchiotti Revival Dub - 7:18
