= ChinaSMACK =

Blog covering Chinese internet culture

chinaSMACK
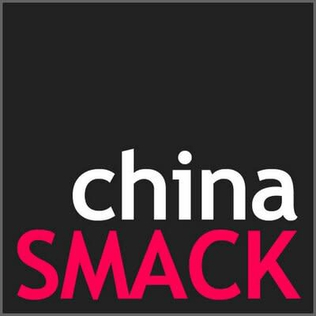
- Website type: blog
- Available in: English (comments dual English/Mandarin)
- Founder: Fauna
- Website: www.chinasmack.com (archived 2024-12-23)
- Launched: 2008; 18 years ago
- Current status: Defunct (as of 2026)

chinaSMACK was a blog that covered Chinese internet culture, trends, and discussion. It was founded and run in Shanghai, China, by a woman under the Internet handle "Fauna", though its server was based in California, United States. Most of its content was composed of trending Chinese-language internet news articles, social media posts, and Chinese netizen comments that had been translated into English, making it accessible to audiences who could not read Mandarin Chinese. It was known for its raw, unfiltered, and often controversial coverage of what becomes popular on the Chinese internet and trends in Chinese netizen sentiments on a broad spectrum of subject-matter. Fauna, the founder, stated in an interview that her intention in creating the site was to both practice her English and "expose foreigners to stories that interested Chinese people."

The site was popular among expats in China and, according to its founder in 2010, roughly 32% of chinaSMACK's readers were from the US, 16% were from China, 6% were from Canada, and 5% were from the UK. Its first post was published on July 9, 2008. Since then, the site had inspired sister blogs (all defunct as of 2016), koreaBANG, indoBOOM, russiaSLAM, and japanCRUSH which adopted chinaSMACK's editorial mission and format for their respective countries and netizen populations.

Notable media and publications that have sourced and cited chinaSMACK include The New York Times, BBC, CNN, AFP, The Telegraph, The Wall Street Journal, Time, The Economist, and The Colbert Report.
