= Her Greatest Inspirational Songs =

Compilation album by Amy Grant
- Released: March 19, 2002
- Recorded: Original tracks recorded between December 1976 and February 1985
- Genre: Gospel/Christian
- Length: 59:18
- Label: RCA/BMG Heritage
- Producer: Paul Williams

Amy Grant chronology
A Christmas to Remember (1999)	Her Greatest Inspirational Songs (2002)	Legacy... Hymns and Faith (2002)

Professional ratings
Review scores
Source	Rating
AllMusic	2/5 stars

Her Greatest Inspirational Songs is a compilation album by Amy Grant. Focusing on songs from the early years of Grant's career from 1977 to 1985. It was released after Sony BMG acquired the rights to the catalog spanning that period.

== Track listing ==
No.	Title	Writer(s)	Original album	Length
1.	"Sing Your Praise to the Lord"	Rich Mullins	Age to Age (1982)	3:18
2.	"Doubly Good to You"	Mullins	Straight Ahead (1984)	3:15
3.	"Never Give You Up"	Amy Grant, Brown Bannister, Marie Tomlinson	My Father's Eyes (1979)	3:22
4.	"All That I Need Is You"	Grant	My Father's Eyes	3:32
5.	"In a Little While"	Grant, Bannister, Gary Chapman, Shane Keister	Age to Age	4:25
6.	"I Have Decided"	Michael Card	Age to Age	3:18
7.	"Family"	Grant	Never Alone (1980)	2:40
8.	"Old Man's Rubble"	Bannister	Amy Grant (1977)	2:59
9.	"Mountain Top"	Bannister	Amy Grant	3:41
10.	"Thy Word"	Grant, Smith	Straight Ahead	3:22
11.	"Beautiful Music"	Lanier Ferguson	Amy Grant	3:04
12.	"The Lord Has a Will"	Barbara Hudson, Mike Hudson	Amy Grant	2:41
13.	"Who to Listen To"	Chapman, Tim Marsh, Mark Wright	Unguarded (1985)	4:25
14.	"Brand New Start"	Grant	Amy Grant	2:54
15.	"Jehovah"	Geoffrey P. Thurman	Straight Ahead	6:00
16.	"All I Ever Have to Be"	Chapman	Never Alone	2:37
17.	"The Now and the Not Yet"	Pam Mark Hall	Straight Ahead	3:35

== Credits ==
- Paul Williams – compilation producer
- Brown Bannister – producer (1–7, 10, 13, 15–17)
- Chris Christian – producer (8, 9, 11, 12, 14)
- Bill Lacey – mastering at Digital Sound & Picture (New York, NY)
- Jeremy Holiday – production coordinator
- John Hudson and Rob Santos – project management
- Neil Carfora, Laura Dorson, Stephanie Kika, Sue Raffman and Betty Ann Rizzo – project coordination
- Smay Vision – design
- Michael Hill – liner notes

== Charts ==
Chart (2002)	Peak position
US Top Contemporary Christian	37
