= A Christmas to Remember (album) =

Studio album by Amy Grant
- Released: October 19, 1999
- Studio: Sound Kitchen (Franklin, Tennessee); Sound House (Brentwood, Tennessee); Seventeen Grand Recording (Nashville, Tennessee); Sony Pictures Studios (Culver City, California); Capitol Studios (Hollywood, California)
- Genre: Christmas
- Length: 38:45
- Label: Myrrh/A&M
- Producer: Michael Omartian

Amy Grant chronology
Behind the Eyes (1997)	A Christmas to Remember (1999)	Her Greatest Inspirational Songs (2002)

Professional ratings
Review scores
Source	Rating
AllMusic	4/5 stars

A Christmas to Remember is the thirteenth studio album by Christian music and pop music singer Amy Grant. The album is a collaboration with the Patrick Williams Orchestra. It is Grant's third Christmas album with a blend of some traditional songs but mostly originals.

In 2007, A Christmas to Remember was reissued and digitally remastered by Grant's new record label, EMI/Sparrow Records, along with Grant's 13 other albums. The remastered edition is labeled with a "Digitally Remastered" logo in the 'gutter' on the CD front. Because of Grant's deal with her previous label, Word Records, the remastered editions of A Christmas to Remember and Behind the Eyes was not sold in Christian Music retailers such as Family Christian Stores or Lifeway Christian Resources until 2009. Until 2009, Word Records continued to distribute those titles to Christian retailers in the original, non-remastered editions while EMI distributed the remastered editions to most major retailers. The twelve remaining remastered editions were distributed by EMI to all US retailers, both Christian and secular.

An early release of the CD was sold exclusively at Target Stores and featured a cover of The Carpenters song "Merry Christmas Darling" as a hidden track. This track was eventually re-released on Grant's 2005 compilation Christmas album My Best Christmas.

A primetime Christmas special, Amy Grant: A Christmas to Remember, aired on December 15, 1999, on CBS, ABC, 36, Vision Celestial. Special guests included 98 Degrees (whose career saw a boost after the appearance), Tony Bennett and CeCe Winans.

== Track listing ==
No.	Title	Writer(s)	Length
1.	"A Christmas to Remember"	Amy Grant, Chris Eaton, Beverly Darnall	4:21
2.	"Christmas Can't Be Very Far Away"	Roger Cook, Wayne Jackson	3:15
3.	"Silent Night"	Joseph Mohr, Franz Gruber	3:46
4.	"Christmas Lullaby (I Will Lead You Home)"	Grant, Eaton	3:10
5.	"Highland Cathedral"	Ulrich Roever, Michael Korb	2:49
6.	"Jingle Bell Rock"	Joe Beal, Jim Boothe	2:25
7.	"Mister Santa"	Pat Ballard	2:30
8.	"'Til the Season Comes 'Round Again"	John Barlow Jarvis, Randy Goodrum	5:04
9.	"Gabriel's Oboe"	Ennio Morricone	2:14
10.	"Welcome to Our World"	Chris Rice	2:56
11.	"Agnus Dei"	Michael W. Smith	6:15

== Personnel ==
- Amy Grant – vocals
- Michael Omartian – acoustic piano (1, 8), arrangements (1)
- Tom Hemby – acoustic guitar (1)
- Biff Watson – acoustic guitar (1, 8)
- Jerry McPherson – electric guitar (1)
- Jimmie Lee Sloas – bass guitar (1)
- Craig Nelson – bass guitar (8)
- Chris McHugh – drums (1)
- John Hammond – drums (8)
- Nashville Pipes and Drums – drums (5), bagpipes (5)
- Jay Dawson – pipe major (5)
- Carol Davis – drum sergeant (5)
- Bobby Taylor – oboe (9)
- Tim Morrison – trumpet solo (11)
- Patrick Williams – string arrangements and conductor (1)
- Beverly Darnall – vocal harmony (1)
- Lisa Bevill – backing vocals (1, 2, 8)
- J.D. Cunningham – backing vocals (1, 2, 8)
- Michael Mellett – backing vocals (1, 2, 8)
- Grace Stumb – child's vocal (4)
- Alvin Chea – male quartet (6)
- Randy Crenshaw – male quartet (6, 7)
- Rick Logan – male quartet (6, 7)
- Mervyn Warren – male quartet (6)
- Jon Joyce – male quartet (7)
- Don Shelton – male quartet (7)
- Vince Gill – vocal harmony (8)

=== Orchestras ===
- Joe Soldo – orchestra contractor
- Sally Stevens – vocal contractor
- Bill Baker, Curt Berg, Jonathan Barracks Griffiths, Clyde Hoggan, Steve Juliani, Jon Marquart, Ralph Mullins, Danny Perito, Dave Wells and Terry Woodson – music preparation (Los Angeles)
- Tom McAninch – music preparation (Nashville)

The Patrick Williams Orchestra (Tracks 2–4, 6, 7, 10 & 11)

- Patrick Williams – arrangements and conductor
- Endre Granat – violin concertmaster

Rhythm section

- Michael Lang – acoustic piano
- Dennis Budimir and John Goux – guitar
- Jim Hughart – rhythm bass
- Gregg Field – drums
- Dale Anderson – percussion

Brass and Woodwinds

- Gary Foster, Dan Higgins, Barbara Northcutt, David Shostac, Sheridon Stokes, Jim Walker and Angela Wiegand – woodwinds
- William Booth, Bill Elton, Alex Iles, Ken Kugler, Bill Reichenbach Jr. and Chauncey Welsch – trombone
- Rick Baptist, Wayne Bergeron, Tim Divers, Jon Lewis, Warren Luening, Malcolm McNab and Tim Morrison – trumpet
- Jim Self – tuba
- Mark Adams, Marni Johnson, Paul Klintworth and John Reynolds – French horn

String section

- Donald V. Ferrone, Jim Hughart and Frances Lui – bass
- Matt Cooker, Dennis Karmazyn, Ray Kelley, Armen Ksajikian, Tim Launderer, Tina Soule and Cecilia Tsan – cello
- Marcia Dickstein – harp
- Bob Becker, Sue Giordano, Mimi Granat, Keith Greene, Vicki Miskolczy, Simon Oswell and Ray Tischer – viola
- Eve Butler, Darius Campo, Assa Drori, Kirsten Fife, Ronald Folsom, Endre Granat, Harry Gronnier, Clayton Haslop, Gwenn Heller, Karen Jones, Liane Mautner, Carolyn Osborn, Bob Sanov, David Stenske, Jennifer Walton and Miwako Watanabe – violin
- Morgan Ames, John Beeney, Susan Boyd, Amick Byram, Elin Carlson, Alvin Chea, Randy Crenshaw, Donna Davidson, Roger Freeland, Jim Gilstrap, Sandie Hall, Linda Harmon, Walt Harrah, Terry Harrinton, Scotty Haskell, Sheri Izzard, Luana Jackman, Clydene Jackson, Bob Joyce, David Joyce, Jon Joyce, Edie Lehmann-Boddicker, Rick Logan, Melissa Mackay., Gene Morford, Don Shelton, Sally Stevens, Susie Stevens Logan, Mervyn Warren, John West and Ann White – choir (3, 10, 11)

Nashville Studio Orchestra (Tracks 5, 8 & 9)

- Ronn Huff – arrangements and conductor
- Carl Gorodetzky – violin concertmaster

Rhythm section

- David Huntsinger – harpsichord
- Biff Watson – guitars
- Craig Nelson – electric bass
- John Hammond – drums
- Eric Darken – percussion

Brass and Woodwinds

- Cynthia Estill – bassoon
- Lee Levine – clarinet
- Ann Richards – flute
- Bobby Taylor – oboe
- Ernie Collins, Prentiss Hobbs and Chris McDonald – trombone
- Jeff Bailey, Mike Haynes and George Tidwell – trumpets
- Gil Long – tuba
- Katy Hagen, Jennifer Kummer, Linda Patterson and Joy Worland – French horn

String section

- Jack Jezioro, Craig Nelson, Liz Stewart and Glen Wanner – bass
- John Catchings, Bradley Mansell, Bob Mason, Margaret Mason, Carole Neuen-Rabinowitz, Lynn Peithman and Julie Tanner – cello
- Mary Alice Hoepfinger – harp
- Monisa Angell, Bruce Christensen, Jim Grosjean, Kathryn Plummer, Gary Vanosdale and Kristin Wilkinson – viola
- David Angell, Janet Askey, Denise Baker, Joann Cruthirds, David Davidson, Beverly Drukker, Conni Ellisor, Carl Gorodetzky, Gerald Greer, Lee Larrison, Cate Myer, Pamela Sixfin, Betty Small, Jocelyn Sprouse, Paul Tobias, Alan Umstead, Catherine Umstead, Mary Kathryn Vanosdale, Carrie Wann and Karen Winklemann – violin

== Production ==
- Amy Grant – executive producer
- Michael Blanton – executive producer
- Jennifer Cooke – executive producer
- Michael Omartian – producer
- Terry Christian – engineer (1, 5, 8, 9), mixing (1, 5, 8, 9)
- Al Schmitt – string engineer (1), recording (2–4, 6, 7, 10, 11), mixing (2–4, 6, 7, 10, 11)
- Peter Doell – assistant engineer
- Mark Eschelman – assistant engineer
- Amy Frigo – assistant engineer
- Steve Genewick – assistant engineer
- Bob Horn – assistant engineer
- Thomas Johnson – assistant engineer
- Bobby Morse – assistant engineer
- Grant Schmitz – assistant engineer
- Bill Smith – assistant engineer
- Pat Weber – assistant engineer
- Doug Sax – mastering at The Mastering Lab (Hollywood, California)
- Suzy Martinez – project coordinator
- Lisa Jurkowski – production coordinator
- Beth Lee – art direction
- Chuck Hargett – design
- Sandra Johnson – photography
- Terri Apansewicz – hair, make-up
- Jani Mussetter – stylist

== Charts ==
Album – Billboard (U.S.)

Year	Chart	Position
1999	Billboard 200	36
1999	Top Holiday Albums	3
1999	Top Contemporary Christian	1
2000	Top Pop Catalog	23

=== End of year charts ===
Year	Chart	Position
1999	Billboard Top Contemporary Christian	35
2000	Billboard Top Contemporary Christian	6
2000	Billboard 200	195

== Certifications and sales ==
Region	Certification	Certified units/sales
United States (RIAA)	Gold	500,000^{^}
^{^} Shipments figures based on certification alone.
