= Somewhere Down the Road (album) =

Studio album by Amy Grant
- Released: March 30, 2010
- Studios: Glomo Studio (Franklin, Tennessee); The Fertle Turtle, The House, Vibe 56 and Casa De Ted (Nashville, Tennessee); The Village Recorder (Los Angeles, California); The Village (Santa Monica, California)
- Genres: Gospel, contemporary Christian music
- Length: 46:46
- Label: EMI CMG/Sparrow
- Producers: Brown Bannister; Mike Brignardello; Ian Fitchuk; Vince Gill; Amy Grant; Wayne Kirkpatrick; Justin Loucks; Greg Morrow; Dan Muckala

Amy Grant chronology
The Christmas Collection (2008)	Somewhere Down the Road (2010)	How Mercy Looks from Here (2013)

Professional ratings
Review scores
Source	Rating
About.com	4.5/5 stars
AllMusic	3/5 stars
Christian Music Review	(8.8/10)
Christianity Today	4/5 stars
Jesus Freak Hideout	4/5 stars

Somewhere Down the Road is the seventeenth studio album by Christian music and pop music singer-songwriter Amy Grant, released in 2010. It is a unique album featuring eight new songs, a new recording of the song "Arms of Love", from her 1982 album Age to Age, and rounded out with three of Grant's previously released story-songs.

The album title is taken from the title track, "Somewhere Down the Road" also a promotional single from Grant's 1997 album Behind the Eyes. The song was originally also featured on the first and only commercial single from Behind the Eyes, "Takes a Little Time". The painting featured on the cover of the album includes a painting by Grant, with the inscription Somewhere Down the Road. Grant gave the original painting as a gift to her friend and publicist Jennifer Cooke.

Most of the new songs on the album were recorded in the new studio that Grant and her husband Vince Gill recently had built into their home. One of the songs on the album, "Overnight", is a duet recorded with Sarah Chapman, Grant's daughter. Grant wrote "Unafraid" about her mother.

Roughly one year after the original release of the album a digital-only expanded edition of the album was released with additional material. The expanded edition includes the video for "Better Than a Hallelujah", the first single from the album, as well as an Ambient Mix of the song. Also included on the expanded edition is a cover of the Pete Seeger song "Turn, Turn, Turn" and two remixes of the song "Overnight" (the Aircandy Mix and the Dyna Mix).

== Track listing ==
No.	Title	Writer(s)	Length
1.	"Better Than a Hallelujah"	Sarah Hart, Chapin Hartford	3:42
2.	"Overnight" (featuring Sarah Chapman)	Amy Grant, Natalie Hemby, Luke Laird, Audrey Spillman	4:24
3.	"Every Road" (previously released on Behind the Eyes, 1997)	Grant, Wayne Kirkpatrick	4:29
4.	"Unafraid"	Grant, Kirkpatrick	3:26
5.	"Hard Times"	Grant, Ian Fitchuk, Justin Loucks	3:01
6.	"What Is the Chance of That"	Grant, Kirkpatrick	3:27
7.	"Somewhere Down the Road" (previously released on Behind the Eyes)	Grant, Kirkpatrick	5:08
8.	"Third World Woman"	Grant, Chris Eaton	3:01
9.	"Find What You're Looking For"	Grant, Mindy Smith	4:25
10.	"Come Into My World"	Grant	3:25
11.	"Arms of Love" (2010 Version) (original version on Age to Age, 1982)	Grant, Gary Chapman, Michael W. Smith	2:59
12.	"Medley: Imagine / Sing the Wondrous Love of Jesus" (previously released on Legacy... Hymns and Faith, 2002)	Bart Millard / Grant	5:18

iTunes Store pre-order bonus track
No.	Title	Writer(s)	Length
13.	"Better Than a Hallelujah (Ambient Mix)"	Hart, Hartford	3:34

Expanded edition
No.	Title	Writer(s)	Length
13.	"Overnight (Dyna Mix)" (featuring Sarah Chapman)	Grant, Hemby, Laird, Spillman	4:24
14.	"Overnight (Aircandy Mix)" (featuring Sarah Chapman)	Grant, Hemby, Laird, Spillman	4:28
15.	"Turn, Turn, Turn"	Book of Ecclesiastes, Pete Seeger	3:09
16.	"Better Than a Hallelujah (Ambient Mix)"	Hart, Hartford	3:31
17.	"Better Than a Hallelujah" (Video)	Hart, Hartford	3:57

== Personnel ==
- Amy Grant – lead vocals, backing vocals (1), acoustic guitar (9, 10)
- Dan Muckala – track programming (1, 2), arrangements (1, 2)
- Tim Lauer – Wurlitzer keyboard (3), keyboards (6)
- Carl Marsh – Fairlight euphonium (3), string arrangements (12)
- Ian Fitchuk – keyboards (5), acoustic piano (5), acoustic guitar (5), bass guitar (5, 8), drums (5, 8), Rhodes piano (8), percussion (8)
- Matt Rollings – acoustic piano (7)
- Phil Madeira – Hammond B3 organ (7)
- Greg Morrow – acoustic piano (9), drums (9), percussion (9)
- Ben Strano – Hammond B3 organ (9)
- John Hobbs – acoustic piano (11), organ (11)
- Pete Wasner – keyboards (11)
- Bernie Herms – acoustic piano (12)
- Tim Akers – Hammond B3 organ (12)
- Adam Lester – acoustic guitar (1, 2), electric guitar (1, 2)
- Gordon Kennedy – electric guitar (3, 6, 7)
- Wayne Kirkpatrick – acoustic guitar (3, 6, 7), hi-string guitar (3), hammered dulcimer (3), backing vocals (3), harmonica (6)
- Jerry McPherson – electric guitars (3), keyboard bassoon (3)
- Greg Leisz – pedal steel guitar (3)
- Brent Mason – guitars (4)
- Justin Loucks – electric guitars (5), drums (5, 8), percussion (8)
- Kenny Greenberg – electric guitar (6)
- Calvin Turner – guitar (8)
- John Jorgenson – guitars (9)
- Billy Panda – acoustic guitar (9), octave mandolin (9)
- Tom Hemby – guitar (11)
- Rivers Rutherford – acoustic guitar (12)
- Chuck Butler – bass guitar (2)
- Jimmie Lee Sloas – bass guitar (3, 6)
- Jackie Street – bass guitar (7)
- Mike Brignardello – bass guitar (9)
- David Hungate – bass guitar (11)
- Michael Rhodes – bass guitar (12)
- John Hammond – drums (3)
- Chris McHugh – drums (6, 7)
- Chad Cromwell – drums (11)
- Dan Needham – drums (12)
- Sam Bacco – percussion (3, 6)
- Chris Carmichael – string arrangements and performance (4)
- The London Session Orchestra – strings (12)
- Sarah Chapman – lead vocals (2)
- Gail Mayes – backing vocals (4)
- Angela Primm – backing vocals (4)
- Jenny Gill – backing vocals (5, 11)
- Peter Groenwalk – backing vocals (5)
- Jeremy Lister – backing vocals (5)
- Leigh Nash – backing vocals (5)
- Mindy Smith – backing vocals (5)
- Michael Mellett – backing vocals (6)
- Chris Rodriguez – backing vocals (6, 7)
- Micah Wilshire – backing vocals (6)
- Billy Gaines – backing vocals (7)
- Donna McElroy – backing vocals (7)
- Perry Coleman – backing vocals (9)
- Vince Gill – backing vocals (11), electric guitar (12), harmony vocal (12)

== Production ==
- Amy Grant – executive producer, cover painting, liner notes, producer (4, 9)
- Jennifer Cooke – executive producer
- Bryan Ward – executive producer
- Dan Muckala – producer (1, 2), engineer (1, 2), mixing (1, 2)
- Wayne Kirkpatrick – producer (3, 6, 7, 10)
- Mike Brignardello – producer (4, 9)
- Greg Morrow – producer (4, 9)
- Ian Fitchuk – producer (5, 8)
- Justin Loucks – producer (5, 8), engineer (5, 8), mixing (5, 8)
- Vince Gill – producer (11)
- Brown Bannister – producer (12)
- Drew Bollman – engineer (1, 11)
- Dan Marnien – engineer (3, 6, 7), mixing (3, 6, 7)
- Ben Strano – engineer (4, 9)
- Dan Deurloo – assistant engineer (1, 2)
- Jed Hackett – additional engineer (4), digital editing (4)
- Scott Velazco – assistant engineer (9)
- Steve Blackman – second engineer (11)
- Russ Long – mixing (4)
- John Hardy – mixing (9)
- David Schober – mixing (11)
- Bob Ludwig – mastering at Gateway Mastering (Portland, Maine)
- Jamie Lynne Neeck – A&R administration
- Jan Cook – art direction
- Beth Mathews – art direction
- Alexis Goodman – package design
- Kristin Barlowe – back cover photography

== Charts ==
=== Weekly charts ===
Year	Chart	Position
2010	The Billboard 200	41
2010	Top Christian Albums	2
2010	Top Digital Albums	19

=== Year-end charts ===
Year	Chart	Position
2010	Billboard Top Christian Albums	19
