= She Colors My Day =

Single by Amy Grant

from the EP She Colors My Day
- Released: May 5, 2009
- Recorded: 2008
- Genre: CCM, Pop
- Length: 3:37
- Label: Amy Grant Productions/EMI
- Songwriters: Cristina Carlino & Stuart Mathis
- Producer: Stuart Mathis

Amy Grant singles chronology
"Come Be with Me" (2004)	"She Colors My Day" (2009)	"Better Than a Hallelujah" (2010)

Music video
- "She Colors My Day" on YouTube

She Colors My Day is a single by Amy Grant. It was originally available for download in 2008 though a link on Grant's website with a donation of $1 to the Entertainment Industry Foundation's Women's Cancer Research Fund. It was later released through iTunes on Mother's Day 2009 on the EP of the same name which also included "Baby Baby" from the Heart in Motion album, "Oh How the Years Go By" from House of Love and the previously unreleased song "Unafraid".

Amy Grant and songwriters Cristina Carlino and Stuart Mathis donated all artist and publishing royalties generated by the sale of the song to the Entertainment Industry Foundation's Women's Cancer Research Fund.

== Music video ==
The video of the song, filmed at the Birmingham Botanical Gardens in Birmingham, Alabama, debuted on Amazon on May 12, 2009.

== Official versions ==
=== Audio versions ===
- Original download version (3:37)

=== Video versions ===
- Original video version (3:48)
