= Tennessee Christmas (album) =

Studio album by Amy Grant
- Released: October 21, 2016
- Genres: Christmas, Contemporary Christian music
- Length: 42:20
- Labels: Capitol, Sparrow
- Producers: Mac McAnally; Marshall Altman; Ed Cash

Amy Grant chronology
Be Still and Know... Hymns & Faith (2015)	Tennessee Christmas (2016)	The Me That Remains (2026)

Singles from Tennessee Christmas
- 1. "To Be Together" Released: 2016

Professional ratings
Review scores
Source	Rating
AllMusic	4/5 stars
CCM Magazine	5/5 stars
Jesus Freak Hideout	4.5/5 stars

Tennessee Christmas is the nineteenth studio album and fourth solo Christmas album by American contemporary Christian music singer and songwriter Amy Grant. It was released on October 21, 2016, on Capitol and Sparrow Records. The album is a collection of new Christmas recordings, song favorites, re-recordings of songs Grant has previously done and a duet with her husband Vince Gill.

== Track listing ==
No.	Title	Writer(s)	Length
1.	"Tennessee Christmas"	Amy Grant, Gary Chapman	4:27
2.	"To Be Together"	Grant, Chris Eaton	4:11
3.	"Christmas for You and Me"	Nathan Dugger, Ellie Holcomb	3:04
4.	"Melancholy Christmas"	Grant, Marshall Altman	3:02
5.	"December"	Isaac Darnell	3:29
6.	"White Christmas"	Irving Berlin	2:23
7.	"Joy to the World"	Isaac Watts	3:08
8.	"I've Got My Love to Keep Me Warm"	Berlin	3:24
9.	"Baby, It's Cold Outside" (duet with Vince Gill)	Frank Loesser	3:15
10.	"Christmas Don't Be Late"	Ross Bagdasarian	3:15
11.	"Still Can’t Sleep"	Ed Cash, Franni Cash	3:12
12.	"Another Merry Christmas"	Grant, E. Cash	2:22
13.	"O Come, All Ye Faithful"	John Francis Wade	3:07
Total length:			42:20

Digital, Target and 10th Anniversary Edition bonus tracks
No.	Title	Writer(s)	Length
14.	"From the Cold"	Cody Fry	4:35
15.	"What Child Is This"	William Chatterton Dix	3:16

10th Anniversary Edition
No.	Title	Length
16.	"To Be Together" (with Cain)	4:08
17.	"Still Can’t Sleep" (with Franni Cash)	3:10
18.	"From the Cold" (The Family Mix)	4:31
19.	"What Child Is This" (By Candlelight Mix)	3:16

Notes

- Grant originally recorded the album title track for her 1983 album A Christmas Album.
- Grant previously recorded a version of "Joy to the World", originally as a medley entitled "Joy to the World / For Unto Us a Child is Born" for her 1992 album Home for Christmas.

== Personnel ==
- Amy Grant – vocals, harmony vocals (13)
- Charlie Judge – keyboards (1, 2, 5, 8, 10, 13)
- Mac McAnally – keyboards (1, 2, 5, 8, 10, 13), guitars (1, 2, 5, 8, 10, 13), mandolins (1, 2, 5, 8, 10, 13), harmony vocals (13)
- Tim Lauer – keyboards (3, 4, 6, 15), acoustic piano (3, 4, 6, 15), organ (3, 4, 6, 15), Mellotron (3, 4, 6, 15), accordion (3, 4, 6, 15)
- Jason Webb – acoustic piano (7, 9, 11, 12, 14)
- Rob McNelley – guitars (1, 2, 5, 8, 10, 13), electric guitar (3, 4, 6)
- Gabe Scott – acoustic guitar (3, 4, 6, 15)
- Vince Gill – guitar solo (6), lead vocals (9), harmony vocals (13)
- Ed Cash – acoustic guitar (7, 9, 11, 12, 14)
- Nathan Dugger – electric guitar (7, 9, 11, 12, 14)
- Mike Brignardello – bass (1, 2, 5, 8, 10, 13)
- Mark Hill – bass (3, 4, 6, 15)
- Matt Pierson – bass (7, 9, 11, 12, 14)
- Greg Morrow – drums (1, 2, 5, 8, 10, 13)
- Jerry Roe – drums (3, 4, 6, 15)
- Eric Darken – percussion (1, 2, 5, 8, 10, 13)
- Corrina Gill – backing vocals (3, 10), harmony vocals (13)
- Jenny Gill – backing vocals (3, 10), harmony vocals (13)
- Sarah Chapman – backing vocals (10), harmony vocals (13)
- Hailey Darkwa – harmony vocals (13)
- Lenny LeBlanc – harmony vocals (13)
- Rachel Robinson – harmony vocals (13)

== Production ==
- Peter York – executive producer
- Mac McAnally – producer (1, 2, 5, 8, 10, 13)
- Marshall Altman – producer (3, 4, 6, 15), vocal recording (3, 4, 6, 15)
- Ed Cash – producer (7, 9, 11, 12, 14)
- Chris Stone – engineer (1, 2, 5, 8, 10, 13), mixing (1, 5, 8, 10, 13)
- Craig Alvin – recording (3, 4, 6, 15), mixing (3, 4, 6, 15)
- Drew Bollman – engineer (7, 9, 11, 12, 14), editing (7, 9, 11, 12, 14)
- Matt Rausch – additional recording (1, 2, 5, 8, 10, 13), assistant engineer (1, 2, 5, 7–14), recording (3, 4, 6, 15), editing (7, 9, 11, 12, 14)
- Kyle Lehning – mixing (2)
- Sean Moffitt – mixing (7, 9, 11, 12, 14)
- Warren David – mix assistant (7, 9, 11, 12, 14)
- Andrew Mendelson – mastering
- Angela Talley – production assistant (3, 4, 6)
- Becca Wildsmith – art direction, design
- Russ Harrington – photography
- Sheila Davis – hair, make-up
- Trish Townsend – wardrobe stylist
- Phyllis Mayfield – set design

Studios

- Recorded at The House (Nashville, Tennessee).
- Additional recording and mixing on Tracks 1, 2, 5, 8, 10 & 13 at La La Land (Muscle Shoals, Alabama) and La La Land Nashville.
- Vocals on Tracks 3, 4, 6 & 15 recorded at The Galt Line (Nashville, Tennessee).
- Mixed at La La Land Nashville, The Compound, The Great Gazoo Reading Room and Yoda's Palace Studios (Nashville, Tennessee).
- Mastered at Georgetown Masters (Nashville, Tennessee).

== Charts ==
Chart (2016)	Peak position
US Billboard 200	31
US Top Contemporary Christian	1
US Top Holiday Albums	3
