= Rock of Ages... Hymns and Faith =

Studio album by Amy Grant
- Released: May 3, 2005
- Recorded: 2004–2005
- Studios: Ocean Way Nashville and Oxford Sound (Nashville, Tennessee)
- Genres: Christian music, hymns, southern gospel
- Length: 45:36
- Label: Word Entertainment
- Producers: Brown Bannister; Vince Gill

Amy Grant chronology
Greatest Hits 1986–2004 (2004)	Rock of Ages... Hymns and Faith (2005)	Time Again... Amy Grant Live (2006)

Professional ratings
Review scores
Source	Rating
About.com	3/5 stars
AllMusic	4/5 stars

Rock of Ages... Hymns and Faith is the sixteenth studio album by Christian and pop singer Amy Grant. It is the follow-up to her 2002 release Legacy... Hymns and Faith. Rock of Ages is Amy Grant's 11th Christian chart-topping album.

== Track listing ==
No.	Title	Writer(s)	Length
1.	"Anywhere With Jesus"	Jesse Brown Pounds; Daniel B. Towner	3:12
2.	"Carry You"	Amy Grant	3:00
3.	"Sweet Will of God"	Lelia N. Morris	3:45
4.	"Joyful, Joyful, We Adore Thee"	Henry van Dyke, Jr.; Ludwig van Beethoven	3:25
5.	"Jesus Loves Me/They'll Know We Are Christians/Helping Hand"	Anna Bartlett Warner; David Rutherford McGuire; William Batchelder Bradbury / Peter Scholtes / Tommy Sims; Grant; Beverly Darnall	4:44
6.	"Rock of Ages" (Duet with Vince Gill)	Augustus M. Toplady; Thomas Hastings	3:39
7.	"O Master, Let Me Walk With Thee"	Washington Gladden; Henry Percy Smith	2:46
8.	"Abide With Me"	Henry Francis Lyte; William Henry Monk	4:49
9.	"God Moves in a Mysterious Way/The Lord Is in His Holy Temple"	William Cowper / Habakkuk 2:20; William J. Kirkpatrick	2:06
10.	"Turn Your Eyes Upon Jesus"	Helen Howarth Lemmel	3:09
11.	"El Shaddai"	Michael Card; John Thompson	4:06
12.	"I Surrender All"	Judson W. Van DeVenter; Winfield S. Weeden	2:37
13.	"O Love That Will Not Let Me Go"	George Matheson; Albert Lister Peace	4:18
Total length:			45:36

== Personnel ==
Musicians

- Amy Grant – vocals
- John Jarvis – Wurlitzer electric piano (1), acoustic piano (2–8, 11–13), keyboards (8)
- John Hobbs – Hammond B3 organ (1, 3, 6, 8, 12, 13), Rhodes electric piano (2, 8), synthesizer (2), electric piano (4), acoustic piano solo (4), keyboards (5, 11), acoustic piano (9)
- Richard Bennett – archtop guitar (1), electric guitar (2, 3, 5, 6, 8, 11, 13), cavaquinho (4, 7, 10), electric 12-string guitar (12)
- Vince Gill – acoustic guitar (1–5, 11, 12), electric guitar solo (1, 2, 5, 8), mandolin (4, 12), archtop guitar (10), acoustic guitar solo (11), octave mandolin (12)
- Dean Parks – slide guitar (1), electric guitar (2–8, 11–13)
- Willie Weeks – bass guitar (1–8, 11–13), upright bass (10)
- Chad Cromwell – drums (1–8, 11–13)
- Eric Darken – percussion (7), tambourine (8), conga (8)
- Stuart Duncan – fiddle (4), banjo (5)
- Sam Levine – penny whistle (7)
- John Catchings – cello (9)
- Andrea Zonn – viola (9), violin (9)
- Jim Horn – saxophone (13), horn arrangements (13)
- Harvey Thompson – saxophone (13)
- Charlie Rose – trombone (13)
- Quinton Ware – trumpet (13)

Background vocalists

- Bekka Bramlett – backing vocals (1, 5)
- Vince Gill – backing vocals (1–3, 5, 7, 8, 10–12), vocals (6)
- Kim Keyes – backIng vocals (1)
- Billy Thomas – backing vocals (1)
- Jenny Gill – backing vocals (2, 7, 12)
- Andrea Zonn – backing vocals (3)
- The Brazos River Mountain Boys – backing vocals (4)
- Michael McDonald – backing vocals (5)
- The Fairfield Four (Robert Hamlett, Isaac Freeman, Wilson Waters Jr. and James Fizer) – backing vocals (6)
- The Brazos River Choir – backing vocals (9)
- Kathy Grant Harrell – backing vocals (10)
- Mimi Grant Verner – backing vocals (10)
- Carol Grant Nuismer – backing vocals (10)
- Gloria Grant – backing vocals (10)
- Burton Grant – backing vocals and recitation (10)

== Production ==
- Brown Bannister – producer
- Vince Gill – producer
- Steve Bishir – recording, mixing
- Brian Grabin – recording assistant
- Steve Hall – mastering at Future Disc Systems (North Hollywood, California)
- Traci Sterling Bishir – production manager for Sterling Production Management
- Burton Brooks – A&R administration
- Katherine Petillo – art direction
- Sally Carns Gulde – design
- Blair Berle – senior creative administrator
- Andrew Southam – photography
- Rob Talty – hair stylist for Luxe
- Jamie Taylor – make-up for Solo Artists
- David Kaufman – wardrobe

== Charts ==
Album – Billboard (North America)

Year	Chart	Position
2005	200	42
2005	Christian Albums	1

== Awards ==
Grammy Awards

Year	Winner	Category
2006	Rock of Ages... Hymns and Faith	Best Southern, Country or Bluegrass Gospel Album

GMA Dove Awards

Year	Winner	Category
2006	Rock of Ages... Hymns and Faith	Inspirational Album of the Year

- The Dove Award for Inspirational Album of the Year was in a tie with Bart Millard's Hymned, No. 1.
