= Takes a Little Time (Amy Grant song) =

Single by Amy Grant

from the album Behind the Eyes
- Released: 1997
- Studio: Secret Studio, Franklin, TN
- Length: 4:33
- Label: Myrrh/Word
- Songwriters: Amy Grant; Wayne Kirkpatrick
- Producers: Keith Thomas; Wayne Kirkpatrick; John Darnall

Amy Grant singles chronology
"The Things We Do for Love" (1996)	"Takes a Little Time" (1997)	"Somewhere Down the Road" (1997)

Music video
- "Takes a Little Time" on YouTube

"Takes a Little Time" was a maxi-single released in 1997 (see 1997 in music) to promote Amy Grant's album Behind the Eyes, which was also released that year. "Takes a Little Time" included two songs from Behind the Eyes, as well as a new version of Grant's 1982 Christian radio hit, "El Shaddai". The maxi-single was also an enhanced CD (ECD); a video could be viewed when inserted into a home computer. The ECD portion of the CD contained a live acoustic version of the song After the Fire, which Grant later released on her 2003 album Simple Things; Grant stated on Oprah that she had written the song for her mother.

The song was covered by Flamy Grant in her album Bible Belt Baby, which charted at No. 1 on the iTunes Christian Albums in 2023.

== Track listing ==
1. "Takes a Little Time" (Grant, Kirkpatrick) - 4:33
2. "Somewhere Down the Road" (Grant, Kirkpatrick) - 5:09
3. "El Shaddai '97" (Card, Thompson) - 4:10
- Bonus multimedia track - 39:14

== Personnel ==
- Amy Grant – lead vocals
- Keith Thomas – keyboards, electric guitar
- Kenny Greenberg – electric guitar
- Gordon Kennedy – acoustic guitar, electric guitar
- Tommy Sims – bass
- Chad Cromwell – drums
- Mark Hammond – additional drum programming
- Terry McMillan – percussion, harmonica
- Lisa Cochran – backing vocals
- Tabitha Fair – backing vocals

== Chart positions ==
=== Weekly charts ===
Chart (1997)	Peak position
Australia (ARIA)	181
Canada Top Singles (RPM)	14
US Billboard Hot 100 Airplay	21
US Billboard Mainstream Top 40	25
US Billboard Hot Adult Top 40 Tracks	15
US Billboard Adult Contemporary	4

=== Year-end charts ===
Chart (1997)	Position
Canada Top Singles (RPM)	85
