= Legacy... Hymns and Faith =

Studio album by Amy Grant
- Released: May 21, 2002
- Recorded: 2001–2002
- Studio: AIR Studios (London, England); East Iris Studios (Nashville, Tennessee); Ocean Way Recording (Nashville, Tennessee); The Parlor (Nashville, Tennessee)
- Genre: Christian music, hymns
- Length: 53:16
- Label: Word, A&M
- Producer: Brown Bannister; Vince Gill

Amy Grant chronology
Her Greatest Inspirational Songs (2002)	Legacy... Hymns and Faith (2002)	Simple Things (2003)

Professional ratings
Review scores
Source	Rating
AllMusic	4/5 stars

Legacy... Hymns and Faith is the fourteenth studio album by Christian singer and songwriter Amy Grant. It was her first overtly religious album since Lead Me On in 1988, and consists primarily of well-known hymns with a few original songs. Early pressings of the CD are in "double disc" format containing a music CD and a bonus DVD with a behind the scenes documentary in the studio recording the album. Grant released a follow-up to this album, Rock of Ages... Hymns and Faith in 2005.

== Track listing ==
- Tracks 1–4, 6, 8, 10–11, and 13–14 arranged by Vince Gill and Brown Bannister. Track 12 arranged by Ronn Huff.
1. "This Is My Father's World" (public domain) – 3:05
2. "My Jesus, I Love Thee" (public domain) – 3:34
3. "Softly and Tenderly" (public domain) – 4:03
4. "I Need Thee Every Hour"/"Nothing but the Blood" (public domain) – 4:42
5. "What You Already Own" (Grant) – 3:21
6. "It Is Well with My Soul"/"The River's Gonna Keep On Rolling" (public domain, Gill) – 4:54
7. "Do You Remember the Time" (Gill, Grant, Keith Thomas) – 3:51
8. "Fields of Plenty"/"Be Still My Soul" (P.D., Bennett) – 4:36
9. "Imagine"/"Sing the Wondrous Love of Jesus" (P.D., Grant, Bart Millard) – 5:17
10. "Come, Thou Fount of Every Blessing" (public domain) – 3:15
11. "Fairest Lord Jesus" (public domain) – 3:15
12. "Holy, Holy, Holy" (public domain) – 2:26
13. "What a Friend We Have in Jesus"/"Old Rugged Cross"/"How Great Thou Art" (public domain, Stuart K. Hine) – 3:30
14. "Marching to Zion" (public domain) – 3:20

== Personnel ==
Musicians

- Amy Grant – vocals
- Tim Akers – Hammond B3 organ (1, 4, 6, 7, 9, 10), accordion (2, 5, 11), synthesizer (3)
- Pete Wasner – acoustic piano (1–3, 5, 6), synthesizer (11)
- John Jarvis – acoustic piano (4, 7, 10, 11)
- Bernie Herms – acoustic piano (9)
- Michael Omartian – acoustic piano (13)
- Vince Gill – acoustic guitar solo (1), mandolin (2, 5, 6, 12), electric guitar solo (3, 7, 10), electric guitar (4, 9, 13), dobro (5), acoustic guitar (11, 14)
- Kenny Greenberg – electric guitar (1–6, 10)
- Biff Watson – acoustic guitar (1, 6)
- Mac McAnally – acoustic guitar (2, 3, 5)
- Tom Britt – electric guitar (4)
- Richard Bennett – acoustic guitar (4, 7, 8, 10, 11), gut-string guitar (12)
- Gordon Kennedy – electric guitar (7), acoustic guitar (11)
- Rivers Rutherford – acoustic guitar (9)
- Leland Sklar – bass (1–7, 10, 11)
- Michael Rhodes – bass (9)
- Chad Cromwell – drums (1–7, 10), floor tom (11)
- Dan Needham – drums (9)
- Eric Darken – additional percussion (11)
- Sam Levine – penny whistle (2), tenor saxophone (4), clarinet (4)
- Jim Horn – baritone saxophone (4), tenor saxophone (4), horn arrangements (4)
- Barry Green – trombone (4)
- Mike Haynes – trumpet (4)
- Jim Hoke – harmonica (7)
- Stuart Duncan – fiddle (2, 8)
- Andrea Zonn – fiddle (11)
- John Catchings – cello (13)
- Carl Marsh – string arrangements and conductor (9)
- The London Session Orchestra – strings (9)
- The Nashville String Machine – strings (12)

Background vocalists

- Vince Gill – harmony vocal (1, 2, 9), vocals (4), backing vocals (6, 10)
- Amy Grant – harmony vocal (5, 7)
- Bekka Bramlett – backing vocals (4)
- Kim Keyes – backing vocals (4, 6)
- Billy Thomas – backing vocals (4, 10)
- Alison Krauss – harmony vocal (11)

Bagpipes and Drums on "Marching to Zion"

- Roy Barber
- Todd Boswell
- Greg Cutcliff
- Carol Dav
- Jay Dawson

Choir on "Marching to Zion"

- Aerin
- Brown Bannister
- Michelle Bentrem
- Sterling Bishir
- Traci Bishir
- Michael Blanton
- Beverly Darnall
- John Darnall
- Teresa Ellis
- Don Finto
- Amy Grant
- Burton Grant
- Kathy Harrell
- Chris Harris
- Jan Harris
- Cindy Hudson
- Leigh Ann Jones
- Bonnie Keen-King
- Ginger Lang
- Phyllis Mayfield
- Carol Nuismer
- Carol Pigg
- Gary Pigg
- Jerry Regan
- Jerry Verner

== Production ==
- Michael Blanton – executive producer
- Brown Bannister – producer
- Vince Gill – producer
- Steve Bishir – recording, mixing
- Hank Nirider – recording assistant, mix assistant
- Chris Scherbak – recording assistant, mix assistant
- Sang Park – recording assistant, mix assistant
- Greg Fogie – recording assistant, mix assistant
- Fred Paragano – digital editing
- Doug Sax – mastering
- Robert Hadley – mastering
- The Mastering Lab (Hollywood, California) – mastering location
- Astro May – photoshoot
- Kevin Tucker – cover
- Katherine Petillo – designer
- Susan Browne – packing
- Richard Seagraves – photography
- Kara Irvine – wardrobe, styling
- Lars Nordensten – wardrobe, styling
- Melanie Shelly – hair
- Shelia Davis – make-up

== Charts ==
=== Weekly charts ===
Year	Chart	Position
2002	The Billboard 200	21
2002	Top Contemporary Christian	1
2002	Top Internet Albums	50

=== Year-end charts ===
Year	Chart	Position
2002	Billboard Top Contemporary Christian	12

== Certifications and sales ==
Region	Certification	Certified units/sales
United States (RIAA)	Gold	500,000^{^}
^{^} Shipments figures based on certification alone.

== Awards ==
GMA Dove Awards

Year	Winner	Category
2003	"The River's Gonna Keep On Rolling"	Country Recorded Song of the Year
2003	Legacy... Hymns and Faith	Inspirational Album of the Year
