= How Mercy Looks from Here =

Studio album by Amy Grant
- Released: May 14, 2013
- Recorded: October 2012
- Studios: House of Blues, Nashville; Ocean Way, Nashville; The Galt Line, Nashville; Bennett House, Franklin; The Barn, Washington; Portero, Los Angeles
- Genres: CCM, gospel, soft rock
- Length: 42:16
- Labels: Capitol CMG, Sparrow
- Producer: Marshall Altman

Amy Grant chronology
Somewhere Down the Road (2010)	How Mercy Looks from Here (2013)	In Motion: The Remixes (2014)

Singles from How Mercy Looks from Here
- 1. "Don't Try So Hard" Released: 2013; 2. "If I Could See (What the Angels See)" Released: 2013

How Mercy Looks from Here is the eighteenth studio album from contemporary Christian music singer and songwriter and recording artist Amy Grant. The album was released by Capitol CMG and Sparrow Records on May 14, 2013. The album is produced by Marshall Altman, marking his first collaboration with Grant. The first single released in support of the album is "Don't Try So Hard", a faith-based ballad featuring James Taylor singing harmonized background accompaniment.

== Background ==
This album is dedicated to Grant's mother, Gloria Grant, whose struggle with dementia and subsequent death inspired many of the album's lyrics. In addition, the album was produced by Marshall Altman.

== Music and lyrics ==
Andy Argyrakis of CCM Magazine, told that the release contains "several reflective, contemplative and wisdom filled tales". To this, Christian Music Zine's Joshua Andre called these "songs with stories that are very close to her heart." Michael Dalton of The Phantom Tollbooth found the music to be "somewhat rustic, laid-back music fits well with the homespun sentiments", which are "honesty, affirmation and love", yet at the same time "it is also sobering and wistful." In addition, Bert Saraco of The Phantom Tollbooth wrote that "How Mercy Looks from Here is a statement of life right now, with observations about life, faith, death, and contentment", which "the tracks are well crafted and solidly produced by Marshall Altman."

At Indie Vision Music, Jonathan Andre noted the fact that the listener is "encouraged to make our relationship with God a priority through these 11 tracks." In tone, Kevin Davis alluded to how this release has a "somewhat somber tone", which this "is quite soothing and many of these songs are lyrically profound", and the effort "soothes, moves and challenges listeners" because it is done "with relatable lyrics, incredible singing and prayerful themes". Mike Pueschell of Worship Leader told that her "wisdom and life experience ring loud and clear in this body of work." At Cross Rhythms, Lins Honeyman told that the release "captures something of the spiritual, vocal and musical maturity that has come from over 30 years in the business." Lastly, Honeyman noted that "whilst Grant has enlisted the help of some celebrity buddies [...] their involvement is sufficiently low key not to take away from what is essentially another seasoned and skilled performance from the artist herself." In agreement, Saraco felt that "guest artists include James Taylor, Carole King, Sheryl Crow, Eric Paslay, Vince Gill and Will Hoge [...] none of whom upstage Grant."

== Critical reception ==
Professional ratings
Review scores
Source	Rating
CCM Magazine	5/5 stars
Christian Music Zine	4.25/5
Cross Rhythms	9/10 squares
Indie Vision Music	4/5 stars
Jesus Freak Hideout	3.5/5 stars
Louder Than the Music	4/5 stars
New Release Tuesday	4.5/5 stars
The Phantom Tollbooth	4/5 stars 4.5/5 stars
USA Today	3/4 stars
Worship Leader	4/5 stars

How Mercy Looks from Here has received acclaim by sacred and secular music critics alike.

At Allmusic, Steve Leggett suggested that "the songs glow with the gentle redemptive wisdom that is her strong point as a songwriter and singer." At CCM Magazine, Andy Argyrakis proclaimed that "the revered veteran is also at yet another creative peak punctuated by authentic vocal delivery, understated but sophisticated production". Christian Music Zine's Joshua Andre affirmed that the release "will surely be a classic in many, many years." At Cross Rhythms, Lins Honeyman called "this one of her most satisfying releases in her long career." Jonathan Andre of Indie Vision Music vowed that this is "a gem to listen to" that "is a standout album" because it is an "inspirational and meaningful album!"

At Jesus Freak Hideout, Bert Gangl claimed that the release "offers proof of the most endearing kind that, even with so many milestones, heartaches and lessons learned behind her, the well of passion and insight that first inspired Grant to write down her deepest thoughts and share them with the world at large shows no sign of running dry any time soon." Louder Than the Music's Cathy Bruce told that what makes this album so great is "the stories contained in these tracks and this is a great return after so many years." Kevin Davis of New Release Tuesday evoked how this "is a profound listening experience and a very solid return from one of Christian music's most beloved stars."

The Phantom Tollbooth's Michael Dalton called this album "more rewarding" than her previous works. In addition, Bert Saraco of The Phantom Tollbooth felt that "the result is a generally more even-toned album of music for grown-ups." At USA Today, Elysa Gardner said, "Grant's voice has never been technically impressive; but her singing has an easy grace that's well served by these songs of love, loss, faith and resilience, which benefit from Marshall Altman's spare, glowing production." At Worship Leader, Mike Pueschell felt that the release did not contain any "filler," saying that "these songs are the breath of her life" and that Grant "hit the nail on the head."

== Commercial performance ==
For the Billboard charting week of June 1, 2013, How Mercy Looks from Here debuted at No. 12 on the Billboard 200 chart with 26,000 copies sold, making it her highest debut on the chart since her 1997 album Behind the Eyes. How Mercy Looks from Here also charted at No. 10 on the Top Digital Albums chart, and became Grant's record 16th chart-topping album on the Christian Albums chart.

== Track listing ==
No.	Title	Writer(s)	Length
1.	"If I Could See (What the Angels See)"	Marshall Altman, Amy Grant	3:55
2.	"Better Not to Know" (featuring Vince Gill)	Altman, Jeremy Bose, Grant, Cindy Morgan	4:26
3.	"Don't Try So Hard" (featuring James Taylor)	Ben Glover, Grant	3:44
4.	"Deep As It Is Wide" (featuring Sheryl Crow and Eric Paslay)	Eric Paslay	4:34
5.	"Here"	Altman, Grant, Molly Reed	3:33
6.	"Shovel in Hand" (featuring Will Hoge)	Grant	3:34
7.	"Golden"	Altman, Eaton, Grant	4:33
8.	"Our Time Is Now" (featuring Carole King)	Altman, Jon Foreman, Grant	3:26
9.	"Not Giving Up"	Altman, Grant, Luke Laird, Reed	3:38
10.	"How Mercy Looks from Here"	Grant, Paslay	4:16
11.	"Greet the Day"	Grant, Morgan	2:37
Total length:			42:16

Digital bonus deluxe edition tracks
No.	Title	Writer(s)	Length
12.	"Free"	Eaton, Grant	3:41
13.	"Faith"	Grant, Altman, Keb' Mo'	3:51
Total length:			49:48

Target edition
No.	Title	Writer(s)	Length
14.	"Threaten Me with Heaven"	Vince Gill, Grant, Brian O'Doherty, Will Owsley	4:07

== Personnel ==
Vocals

- Amy Grant – lead vocals, backing vocals (7)
- Marshall Altman – backing vocals (1, 10–12, 14)
- Molly Reed – backing vocals (1, 5, 9)
- Vince Gill – backing vocals (2)
- James Taylor – backing vocals (3)
- Sheryl Crow – backing vocals (4)
- Eric Paslay – backing vocals (4)
- Choir (4) – Jessi Alexander, Dylan Altman, Marshall Altman, Thad Cockrell, Corrina Gill, Jenny Gill, Amy Grant, Cherill Green, Natalie Harker, Morgane Hayes, Kim Keyes, Donna Paslay, Eric Paslay, Scat Springs, Chris Stapleton and Natalie Stovall.
- Will Hoge – backing vocals (6)
- Natalie Stovall – backing vocals (7)
- Carole King – backing vocals (8)
- Family vocals (8) – Abi Ferrin, April Abney, Paige Weinberg, Amy Grant, Burton Grant, Corrina Gill, Jenny Gill, Matt Chapman, Millie Chapman and Sarah Chapman.
- Jenny Gill – backing vocals (9, 13)
- Shelly Bilbrey – backing vocals (12)

Musicians

- Tim Lauer – keyboards, acoustic piano, electric piano, organ, accordion, dulcimer, harmonica, synth bass (7)
- Keb' Mo' – Rhodes (13), acoustic piano (13)
- Marshall Altman – acoustic guitar (1–4, 6–9, 11–14), programming (5, 12), percussion (5, 13), celesta (5, 12), acoustic piano (5), Rhodes (6), drum programming (7), organ (12), banjo (14), ukulele (14)
- Adam Shoenfeld – electric guitar
- David Levita – acoustic guitar, electric guitar
- Tom Bukovac – additional electric guitar (1, 3–5, 7–14)
- Vince Gill – electric guitar (2), acoustic guitar (4, 10), mandolin (10), mandocello (10)
- Eric Paslay – acoustic guitar (4)
- Jedd Hughes – electric guitar (4)
- Rob McNelley – electric guitar (4)
- Tony Lucido – bass guitar, synth bass (6)
- Greg Morrow – drums (1)
- Jeremy Lutito – drums (2–6, 8–14), drum programming (5, 8, 10)
- Ronn Huff – string arrangements (2, 4)
- Jim Gray – string arrangements (9), conductor
- Brent Baker – orchestra contractor, music preparation
- The Nashville Session Players – strings (2, 4, 9)
  - Anthony LaMarchina – cello
  - Michael Samis – cello
  - Joel Reist – double bass
  - Jim Grosjean – viola
  - Betsy Lamb – viola
  - David Angell – violin
  - Carrie Bailey – violin
  - David Davidson – violin
  - Jun Iwasaki – violin
  - Mary Katherine Vanosdale – violin
  - Karen Winklemann – violin

Production

- Executive Producer – Peter York
- Producer – Marshall Altman
- All tracks recorded by Craig Alvin
- Assistant Engineers – Tom Freitag and Nick Spezia
- James Taylor's vocal on track 3 recorded by Dave O'Donnell, coordinated by Ellyn Kumsin.
- Carole King's vocal on track 8 recorded by Nathaniel Alford, coordinated by Louise Goffin.
- Vince Gill's vocal and instruments recorded by Matt Rausch.
- Strings recorded by Bill Whittington, assisted by Matt Rausch.
- Tracks 1, 2 & 4–14 mixed by Craig Alvin at The Great Gazoo Reading Room (Nashville, TN).
- Track 3 mixed by Justin Niebank at Blackbird Studios (Nashville, TN).
- Mastered by Andrew Mendelson at Georgetown Masters (Nashville, TN).
- Production Assistance – Angie Talley
- Production Coordination – Brent Baker
- Art Direction – Jan Cook
- Package Design – Sarah Sung
- Photography – Jim Wright
- Wardrobe – Vincent Boucher
- Hair Stylist and Make-Up – Juanita Lyon

== Charts ==
=== Weekly performance ===
Chart (2013)	Peak position
US Billboard 200	12
US Top Christian Albums (Billboard)	1
US Digital Albums (Billboard)	10

=== End of year charts ===
Year	Chart	Position
2013	U.S. Billboard Christian Albums	18
