= A Christmas Album (Amy Grant album) =

Studio album by Amy Grant
- Released: September 27, 1983
- Recorded: July 3 – August 26, 1983
- Studios: Caribou Ranch (Nederland, Colorado); AIR (London, UK); Sound Stage (Nashville, Tennessee); CBS Studios (London, UK); Ocean Way (Hollywood, California); Mama Jo's (North Hollywood, California); Bullet Recording (Nashville, Tennessee); Woodland (Nashville, Tennessee); Bill Schnee Studios (North Hollywood, California)
- Genres: Christian, Christmas
- Length: 37:35
- Label: Myrrh
- Producer: Brown Bannister

Amy Grant chronology
Ageless Medley (1983)	A Christmas Album (1983)	Straight Ahead (1984)

Professional ratings
Review scores
Source	Rating
AllMusic	5/5 stars

A Christmas Album is the fifth studio album and the first Christmas album by Christian music singer Amy Grant. The album was recorded in nine studios in mid-1983 and was released later that same year.

It was issued on the heels of Grant's immensely successful 1982 LP Age to Age. Primarily for the audiences she attracted with Age to Age, A Christmas Album features well-known sacred and secular standards alongside original songs, and tracks from this album continue to receive airplay to this day during the holiday season on both secular and Christian radio stations. Although not as successful as Age to Age, A Christmas Album still peaked in the Top Ten of the Christian chart and spawned a Top 20 Christian radio single in "Emmanuel." The album would eventually be certified Gold in 1985, and Platinum in 1989. A Christmas Album was listed at No. 40 in the 2001 book, CCM Presents: The 100 Greatest Albums in Christian Music. In 2016, Grant re-recorded the song "Tennessee Christmas" as the opening track of her Christmas album of the same name. The song was released as a single from the album and charted at No. 50 on the Billboard Hot Christian Songs chart in December 2016.

== Track listing ==
No.	Title	Writer(s)	Length
1.	"Tennessee Christmas"	Amy Grant, Gary Chapman	4:33
2.	"Hark! The Herald Angels Sing"	William H. Cummings, Felix Mendelssohn, Charles Wesley	2:53
3.	"Preiset Dem Konig! (Praise the King!)"	Shane Keister	1:39
4.	"Emmanuel"	Michael W. Smith	2:54
5.	"Little Town (new melody to O Little Town of Bethlehem)"	Phillips Brooks (words), Chris Eaton (music)	2:47
6.	"Christmas Hymn"	Grant, Smith	2:32
7.	"Love Has Come"	Grant, Keister, Smith	4:02
8.	"Sleigh Ride"	Leroy Anderson, Mitchell Parish	3:35
9.	"The Christmas Song (Chestnuts Roasting On an Open Fire)"	Mel Tormé, Robert Wells	3:45
10.	"Heirlooms"	Grant, Bannister, Bob Farrell	3:42
11.	"A Mighty Fortress/Angels We Have Heard On High"	Traditional	5:00

== Personnel ==
- Amy Grant – lead vocals (1, 2, 4–11), backing vocals (1)
- Shane Keister – Fender Rhodes (1), Yamaha GS1 (2, 3, 5, 8), Oberheim OB-8 (3–5, 8), Memorymoog (4), Minimoog (4), acoustic piano (7, 9, 10)
- Michael W. Smith – acoustic piano (2, 5, 6), Yamaha GS1 (4), Yamaha GS2 (7, 8), vocoder (10)
- Gary Chapman – acoustic guitar (1), pedal steel guitar (1), backing vocals (1)
- Jon Goin – electric guitar (1), acoustic guitar (2), guitar (4, 5, 7–10)
- Dean Parks – acoustic guitar (1)
- Mike Brignardello – bass (1, 2, 4, 5, 7–10)
- Paul Leim – drums (1, 2, 4, 5, 7, 9, 10), LinnDrum (4), Simmons drums (4), sleigh bells (5, 8), woodblocks (8)
- Victor Feldman – shaker (1), percussion (2, 5, 6)
- Lenny Castro – percussion (4)
- Farrell Morris – percussion (7, 9), bell tree (8), glockenspiel (8), coconut shells (8)
- Alan Moore – string arrangements (1, 2, 5–11), choir arrangements (2, 6, 11), horn arrangements (2, 5, 6, 11), woodwind arrangements (2, 6, 8, 10)
- Gavyn Wright – concertmaster (1, 2, 5–11)
- The Martyn Ford Orchestra – strings (1, 2, 5–11), horns (2), woodwinds (2, 8, 10)
- The Nashville Contemporary Brass Quintet – horns (5, 6, 11)
- Tom McAninch – horns (5, 6, 11)
- Fred Bock – choir director (2, 6, 11)
- The Hollywood Presbyterian Choir – choir (2, 6, 11)
- Bill Champlin – backing vocals (4, 11)
- Tamara Champlin – backing vocals (4, 11)
- Carmen Twillie – backing vocals (4, 11)
- Steve George – backing vocals (5)
- David Page – backing vocals (5)
- Richard Page – backing vocals (5)
- Debbie Hall – backing vocals (8, 9)
- Sandy Hall – backing vocals (8, 9)
- Edie Lehmann – backing vocals (8, 9)

Production

- Michael Blanton – executive producer, cover art concept
- Gary Chapman – executive producer
- Dan Harrell – executive producer, cover art concept
- Brown Bannister – producer
- Jack Joseph Puig – engineer, mixing
- Jim Baird – additional engineer
- Ken Corlew – additional engineer
- Gene Eichelberger – additional engineer
- Brent King – additional engineer
- Mike Ross – additional engineer
- Kevin Burns – assistant engineer
- Steve Ford – assistant engineer
- Daniel Garcia – assistant engineer
- Jerry Mahler – assistant engineer
- Rich Markowitz – assistant engineer
- David Schober – assistant engineer
- Doug Sax – mastering at The Mastering Lab (Hollywood, California)
- Dennis Hill – art direction
- Mike Borum – family photography
- Bill Farrell – cover photography, scenery
- Amy Grant – liner notes

== Chart positions ==
Year	Chart	Position
1984	Top Contemporary Christian	9
1985	Top Holiday Albums	5
1991	Top Pop Catalog	5

== Awards ==
GMA Dove Awards

Year	Winner	Category
1984	A Christmas Album	Recorded Music Packaging of the Year

== Pressings ==
A Christmas Album was the first Amy Grant album to be released in the Compact Disc format. The original CD issue had a manufacturing flaw that caused a small, but noticeable jump during the transition between tracks 3 and 4. The remastered version does not have this defect. The album was also released as a promotional only vinyl picture disc version in a die cut sleeve.
