= Behind the Eyes (Amy Grant album) =

Studio album by Amy Grant
- Released: September 9, 1997
- Recorded: 1996–1997
- Studios: The Bennett House and Dark Horse Recording Studio (Franklin, Tennessee); Secret Sound, October Studio and The Battery (Nashville, Tennessee); The Beanstalk (Brentwood, Tennessee); Westlake Studios and The Village Recorder (Los Angeles, California)
- Genres: Pop, contemporary Christian music
- Length: 49:35
- Labels: Myrrh, A&M
- Producers: Keith Thomas; Wayne Kirkpatrick

Amy Grant chronology
House of Love (1994)	Behind the Eyes (1997)	A Christmas to Remember (1999)

Bonus disc cover
- Cover of More Music From Behind the Eyes

Professional ratings
Review scores
Source	Rating
AllMusic	4.5/5 stars

Behind the Eyes is the twelfth studio album by Christian music and pop music singer Amy Grant, released in 1997.

Issued near the end of Grant's marriage to Christian singer-songwriter Gary Chapman, many of the songs on Behind the Eyes reflect Grant's struggles in her marriage and all relate to a theme of optimism. Upon its release, it went to No. 2 on Billboard's Christian albums chart and No. 8 on the Billboard 200. Meanwhile, the first single from the album, "Takes a Little Time", was a Top Five Adult Contemporary hit and a Top Thirty pop chart single. "Like I Love You" and "I Will Be Your Friend" also reached the Adult Contemporary chart, at No. 10 and No. 27, respectively. The album was also released in a limited two-CD version (with the second CD titled, More Music From Behind the Eyes) with two additional songs.

The album was listed at No. 44 in the 2001 book, CCM Presents: The 100 Greatest Albums in Christian Music and was Grant's highest-placed non-Christmas album, reaching No. 8 on the Billboard 200, compared with Heart in Motion (1991), which reached No. 10, and How Mercy Looks from Here (2013), which reached No. 12.

In 2007, Behind the Eyes was reissued and digitally remastered by Grant's new record label, EMI/Sparrow Records, along with her 13 other albums. The remastered edition is labeled with a "Digitally Remastered" logo in the 'gutter' on the CD front. Because of Grant's deal with her previous label, Word Records, the remastered editions of Behind the Eyes and A Christmas to Remember were not sold in Christian music retailers such as Family Christian Stores or Lifeway Christian Resources until 2009. Until that time, Word Records continued to distribute those titles to Christian retailers in the original, non-remastered editions while EMI distributed the remastered editions to most major retailers. The 12 remaining remastered editions are distributed by EMI to all US retailers, both Christian and secular.

In 2022, in celebration of the album's 25th anniversary, it was reissued on September 9, exactly 25 years to the day of the original album's release. The expanded reissue includes the original 12-song album, previously unreleased songs and demos from the original album's sessions, b-sides, bonus tracks and re-recordings of previously released songs, released on 2 CDs, a 3 LP vinyl set and digitally on music purchasing and streaming platforms.

== Track listing ==
No.	Title	Writer(s)	Length
1.	"Nobody Home"	Glen Ballard, Siedah Garrett	3:37
2.	"I Will Be Your Friend"	Dane DeViller, Sean Hosein, Michelle Lewis	4:00
3.	"Like I Love You"	Amy Grant, Wayne Kirkpatrick, Keith Thomas	4:31
4.	"Takes a Little Time"	Grant, Kirkpatrick	4:32
5.	"Cry a River"	Grant, Kirkpatrick	4:39
6.	"Turn This World Around"	Grant, Beverly Darnall, Thomas	3:40
7.	"Curious Thing"	Grant, Kirkpatrick	4:05
8.	"Every Road"	Grant, Kirkpatrick	4:31
9.	"Leave It All Behind"	Grant, Will Owsley, Tommy Sims	3:22
10.	"Missing You"	Grant	4:28
11.	"The Feeling I Had"	Grant	2:55
12.	"Somewhere Down the Road"	Grant, Kirkpatrick	5:09

Bonus CD More Music From Behind the Eyes
No.	Title	Writer(s)	Length
1.	"Say"	Grant, Kirkpatrick, Owsley	2:44
2.	"What Kind of Love"	Grant, Chris Eaton	3:48

25th Anniversary Expanded Edition (disc one bonus tracks)
No.	Title	Writer(s)	Length
13.	"Turn This World Around" (2022 Version)	Grant, Darnall, Thomas	3:29
14.	"I Will Be Your Friend" (2022 Version)	DeViller, Hosein, Lewis	3:43
15.	"Carry You" (1997 Version) (previously released on WOW 1998 (1997))	Grant	4:52

25th Anniversary Expanded Edition (disc two)
No.	Title	Writer(s)	Length
1.	"Walk on Water"	Grant, Kirkpatrick	5:14
2.	"I Feel Fine"	Grant, Kirkpatrick	4:18
3.	"5 Different Kisses"	Grant, Kirkpatrick	4:19
4.	"What Kind of Love"	Grant, Eaton	3:49
5.	"Come Be With Me"	Beth Nielsen Chapman, Jimmy John Scott	4:11
6.	"What Is the Chance of That" (previously released on Somewhere Down the Road (2010))	Grant, Kirkpatrick	3:27
7.	"I Wanna Love You"	Grant	3:04
8.	"Takes a Little Time" (Wayne Kirkpatrick Version)	Grant, Kirkpatrick	4:48
9.	"I've Got You"	Grant	3:27
10.	"Watching the Waves" (Demo)	Grant	3:46
11.	"Say"	Grant, Kirkpatrick, Owsley	2:43
12.	"How Do You Manage That?"	Grant, Kirkpatrick	3:11
13.	"Come Into My World" (Studio Version) (previously released on Somewhere Down the Road)	Grant	3:48
14.	"Crowded in Here" (Demo)	Grant	3:49
15.	"Come Be With Me" (featuring Keb' Mo') (previously released on Greatest Hits 1986–2004 (2004))	Chapman, Scott	4:18

- "Somewhere Down the Road" on the 25th Anniversary Edition is 48 seconds longer, where it shows the song actually ending instead of fading out.

== Personnel ==
Musicians

- Amy Grant – vocals, acoustic guitar (11)
- Keith Thomas – synthesizer programming (1), acoustic guitar (1), electric guitar (1, 4), keyboards (2–4, 6, 9, 11), guitars (6), string arrangements (11)
- Phil Madeira – Hammond B3 organ (2, 5, 6, 12), accordion (3)
- Tim Lauer – accordion (5), melodica (5), pump organ (5), Wurlitzer keyboard (8)
- John Magine – accordion (7)
- Carl Marsh – Fairlight euphonium (8), keyboards (10)
- Matt Rollings – acoustic piano (12)
- Dann Huff – electric guitars (1, 2, 11), guitars (3)
- Gordon Kennedy – acoustic guitars (2, 4, 6), electric guitar (4, 5, 8, 10–12)
- Kenny Greenberg – electric guitar (4), guitars (6)
- Jerry McPherson – electric guitar (5, 7, 8), gut-string guitar (7), acoustic guitar (7), laúd guitar (7), keyboard bassoon (8), EBow (10)
- Wayne Kirkpatrick – acoustic guitar (5, 7, 8, 10, 12), hi-strung guitar (8), hammered dulcimer (8, 10)
- William Owsley – acoustic guitar (9), electric guitar (9, 12)
- Jerry Douglas – dobro (7)
- Greg Leisz – pedal steel guitar (8, 10)
- David Lindley – Weissenborn guitar (10)
- Mark Hammond – bass programming (1), drums (1, 2, 6, 11), additional drum programming (4), Hammond B3 organ (9)
- Spencer Campbell – bass (2)
- Byron House – bass (3, 6, 11)
- Tommy Sims – bass (4, 9), acoustic guitar (9)
- Jimmie Lee Sloas – bass (5, 7, 8)
- Larry Klein – bass (10), fretless bass (10)
- Jackie Street – bass (12)
- Steve Brewster – drums (3)
- Chad Cromwell – drums (4)
- Chris McHugh – drums (5, 7, 12)
- Dan Needham – drums (9)
- John Hammond – drums (8, 10), shaker (10), tambourine (10)
- Terry McMillan – percussion (3, 4, 6, 11), harmonica (4)
- Sam Bacco – percussion (7, 8)
- Sam Levine – flute (11)
- Ronn Huff – string arrangements (11)
- Carl Gorodetzsky – strings (11)
- Bob Mason – strings (11)
- Kristin Wilkinson – strings (11)

Background vocalists

- Amy Grant – backing vocals (1)
- Lisa Cochran – backing vocals (1, 2, 4)
- Tabitha Fair – backing vocals (2, 4, 7)
- Michelle Lewis – backing vocals (2)
- Kim Keyes – backing vocals (3, 7)
- Wayne Kirkpatrick – harmony vocals (5), backing vocals (5, 8)
- Rick Polmbi – backing vocals (5, 7)
- William Owsley – backing vocals (6, 9)
- Christine Denté – backing vocals (10)
- Billy Gaines – backing vocals (12)
- Donna McElroy – backing vocals (12)
- Chris Rodriguez – backing vocals (12)

=== Production ===
- David Anderle – executive producer
- Michael Blanton – executive producer
- Amy Grant – executive producer
- Keith Thomas – producer (1–4, 6, 9, 11), arrangements (1–4, 6, 9, 11)
- Wayne Kirkpatrick – producer (5, 7, 8, 10, 12)
- Shaun Shankel – production coordinator (1–4, 6, 9, 11)
- D'Ann McAlister – production assistant (5, 7, 8, 10, 12)
- Greg Ross – art direction, design
- Kurt Markus – photography
- Lilly Lee – hand lettering

Technical credits

- Bob Ludwig – mastering at Gateway Mastering (Portland, Maine)
- Bill Whittington – engineer (1–4, 6, 9, 11), mixing (1–4, 6, 9, 11)
- Dan Marnien – engineer (5, 7, 8, 10, 12), mixing (5, 7, 8, 10, 12), overdub recording (5, 7, 8, 10, 12)
- Shawn McLean – assistant engineer (1)
- Greg Parker – assistant engineer (2–4, 6, 9, 11)
- Chuck Linder – assistant engineer (5, 7, 8, 10, 12)
- Patrick Murphy – assistant engineer (5, 7, 8, 10, 12)
- David Nottingham – mix assistant (5, 7, 8, 10, 12), overdub recording assistant (5, 7, 8, 10, 12)
- James "JB" Baird – overdub recording (5, 7, 8, 10, 12)
- Craig Hansen – overdub recording (5, 7, 8, 10, 12)
- Tom Laune – overdub recording (5, 7, 8, 10, 12)
- Eric Elwell – overdub recording assistant (5, 7, 8, 10, 12)
- Eric Greedy – overdub recording assistant (5, 7, 8, 10, 12)
- Andy Haller – overdub recording assistant (5, 7, 8, 10, 12)
- Thomas Johnson – overdub recording assistant (5, 7, 8, 10, 12)
- Frank Rinella – overdub recording assistant (5, 7, 8, 10, 12)
- F. Reid Shippen – overdub recording assistant (5, 7, 8, 10, 12)
- Glen Spinner – overdub recording assistant (5, 7, 8, 10, 12)
- Michael Zainer – overdub recording assistant (5, 7, 8, 10, 12)

== Charts ==
=== Weekly charts ===
Chart (1997)	Peak position
Australian Albums (ARIA)	183
US Billboard 200	8
US Top Contemporary Christian	2

=== End of year charts ===
Year	Chart	Position
1997	Billboard 200	185
1997	Billboard Top Contemporary Christian	6
1998	Billboard Top Contemporary Christian	4

=== End-of-decade charts ===
Chart (1990–99)	Rank
US Billboard Top Contemporary Christian	54

== Certifications and sales ==
Region	Certification	Certified units/sales
United States (RIAA)	Gold	500,000^{^}
^{^} Shipments figures based on certification alone.

== Awards ==
GMA Dove Awards

Year	Winner	Category
1998	Behind the Eyes	Pop/Contemporary Album of the Year
