= Greatest Hits (Amy Grant album) =

Greatest hits album by Amy Grant
- Released: October 2, 2007
- Recorded: 1976–2003
- Genre: Contemporary Christian music, pop
- Length: 79:47
- Label: EMI CMG
- Producer: Brown Bannister; Chris Christian; Michael Omartian; Keith Thomas

Amy Grant chronology
Time Again... Amy Grant Live (2006)	Greatest Hits (2007)	The Christmas Collection (2008)

Professional ratings
Review scores
Source	Rating
AllMusic	4/5 stars
Jesus Freak Hideout	3.5/5 stars

Greatest Hits is a compilation album by contemporary Christian music-pop singer Amy Grant, released on October 2, 2007 (see 2007 in music). It was released by EMI CMG, Grant's new record label, to mark the start of her contract with them. It does not contain new songs, but the record label did remaster all of her songs. It is her latest career-spanning collection (following the 1986 compilation The Collection), and thus overlaps several tracks with both The Collection and Greatest Hits 1986–2004 (2004). As with The Collection, the songs are arranged in reverse chronological order. There is a special edition of the album that also contains a bonus DVD.

The album contains at least one song from all of Grant's non-Christmas studio albums at the time of this album's release, with the exception of Never Alone (1980), Legacy... Hymns and Faith (2002) and Rock of Ages... Hymns and Faith (2005). Notably missing from the collection are several of Grant's hits, including "Everywhere I Go", "Wise Up", "The Next Time I Fall" (a duet with Peter Cetera), and her cover version of Joni Mitchell's "Big Yellow Taxi".

== Track listing ==
=== CD ===
No.	Title	Writer(s)	Original album	Length
1.	"Simple Things"	Amy Grant, Dillon O'Brian, William Owsley, Keith Thomas	Simple Things (2003)	3:57
2.	"Takes a Little Time"	Grant, Wayne Kirkpatrick	Behind the Eyes (1997)	4:27
3.	"Lucky One"	Grant, Thomas	House of Love (1994)	4:09
4.	"House of Love" (duet with Vince Gill)	Greg Barnhill, Kenny Greenberg, Wally Wilson	House of Love	4:37
5.	"Baby Baby"	Grant, Thomas	Heart in Motion (1991)	3:56
6.	"Every Heartbeat"	Grant, Kirkpatrick, Charlie Peacock	Heart in Motion	3:32
7.	"That's What Love Is For"	Grant, Michael Omartian, Mark Mueller	Heart in Motion	4:15
8.	"Good for Me"	Grant, Jay Gruska, Kirkpatrick, Tom Snow	Heart in Motion	3:58
9.	"I Will Remember You"	Grant, Gary Chapman, Thomas	Heart in Motion	5:00
10.	"Lead Me On"	Grant, Kirkpatrick, Michael W. Smith	Lead Me On (1988)	5:36
11.	"Saved by Love"	Grant, Justin Peters, Chris Smith	Lead Me On	5:32
12.	"Stay for Awhile"	Grant, Kirkpatrick, M.W. Smith	The Collection (1986)	5:32
13.	"Find a Way"	Grant, M.W. Smith	Unguarded (1985)	3:28
14.	"Thy Word"	Grant, M.W. Smith	Straight Ahead (1984)	3:17
15.	"Angels"	Grant, Brown Bannister, Chapman, M.W. Smith	Straight Ahead	4:08
16.	"El Shaddai"	Michael Card, John Thompson	Age to Age (1982)	4:07
17.	"In a Little While"	Grant, Bannister, Chapman, Shane Keister	Age to Age	4:19
18.	"Father's Eyes"	Chapman	My Father's Eyes (1979)	4:03
19.	"Old Man's Rubble"	Bannister	Amy Grant (1977)	2:59
Total length:				79:47

=== DVD ===
The DVD contains:

- Music videos for:
  - "Lead Me On"
  - "Every Heartbeat"
  - "Baby Baby"
  - "House of Love"
  - "Takes a Little Time"
- Interview: "Looking Back"
- Feature: Amy shares about her life
- Audio: Acoustic performance of "Takes a Little Time"
- Photo gallery
- Free Ringtone: "Takes a Little Time"
- Free trial membership to FOA (Friends of Amy - Grant's fan club)

== Promotion ==
Grant promoted the hits album on her website using her vlog section, Simple Things. There are two videos used in promotion of the album. One is Grant playing acoustic guitar on an acoustic performance of her hit "Baby Baby", filmed at her house.

The other video has Grant showing many copies of the album around her house in various places such as by her alarm clock and by her pictures, while the acoustic "Baby Baby" is playing in the background. Towards the end of the video, Grant takes out copies of the liner notes from the washing machine, and also brings out copies of the album from the microwave oven.

== Charts ==
=== Weekly charts ===
Year	Chart	Position
2007	The Billboard 200	196
2007	Top Christian Albums	8
2007	Top Christian & Gospel Albums	11

=== End of year charts ===
Year	Chart	Position
2008	Billboard Christian Albums	42
