= Greatest Hits 1986–2004 =

Greatest hits album by Amy Grant
- Released: October 12, 2004
- Recorded: 1986–2004
- Genre: Pop; CCM
- Length: 79:57
- Label: Word; A&M
- Producer: Mike Ragogna and Andy McKaie (compilation); Ed Cash; Wayne Kirkpatrick; Michael Omartian; Brown Bannister; Keith Thomas

Amy Grant chronology
Simple Things (2003)	Greatest Hits 1986–2004 (2004)	Rock of Ages... Hymns and Faith (2005)

Singles from Greatest Hits 1986–2004
- 1. "Come Be with Me" Released: 2004; 2. "The Water" Released: 2004

Professional ratings
Review scores
Source	Rating
About.com	5/5 stars
AllMusic	5/5 stars
Jesus Freak Hideout	4.5/5 stars

Greatest Hits 1986–2004 is a compilation album by pop singer Amy Grant, released in 2004. It was Grant's first such album since The Collection in 1986, and thus her first since achieving mainstream success in the early 1990s. The album includes two previously unreleased songs, "The Water" and "Come Be with Me".

The album was released to the Christian retail market by Word Records, and to other music retailers by A&M Records; A&M's first pressing added a bonus disc of four remixes. It was Grant's final album to be released by A&M; mainstream distribution for Rock of Ages... Hymns and Faith was instead handled by Word's partial owner, Warner Music Group, via Warner Bros. Records; subsequently, Grant left Word and signed to Sparrow Records.

== Track listing ==
Standard edition
No.	Title	Writer(s)	Original album	Length
1.	"The Water"	Ed Cash; Amy Grant	previously unreleased	5:06
2.	"Come Be With Me" (duet with Keb' Mo')	Beth Nielsen Chapman; Jimmy John Scott	previously unreleased	4:19
3.	"The Next Time I Fall" (duet with Peter Cetera)	Bobby Caldwell; Paul Gordon	Solitude/Solitaire (1986)	3:41
4.	"Saved by Love"	Grant; Justin Peters; Chris Smith	Lead Me On (1988)	4:39
5.	"Lead Me On"	Grant; Wayne Kirkpatrick; Michael W. Smith	Lead Me On	5:36
6.	"Baby Baby"	Grant; Keith Thomas	Heart in Motion (1991)	3:56
7.	"Every Heartbeat" (edited version)	Grant; Kirkpatrick; Charlie Peacock	Heart in Motion	3:17
8.	"That's What Love Is For"	Grant; Michael Omartian; Mark Mueller	Heart in Motion	4:16
9.	"Good for Me"	Grant; Jay Gruska; Kirkpatrick; Tom Snow	Heart in Motion	3:58
10.	"I Will Remember You"	Gary Chapman; Grant; Thomas	Heart in Motion	4:59
11.	"Lucky One" (remix)	Grant; Thomas	House of Love (1994)	4:59
12.	"House of Love" (duet with Vince Gill)	Greg Barnhill; Kenny Greenberg; Wally Wilson	House of Love	4:39
13.	"Big Yellow Taxi" (The Paradise Mix)	Joni Mitchell	House of Love	3:03
14.	"The Things We Do for Love"	Graham Gouldman; Eric Stewart	Mr. Wrong: Music from the Original Motion Picture Soundtrack (1996)	3:19
15.	"Takes a Little Time"	Grant; Kirkpatrick	Behind the Eyes (1997)	4:32
16.	"Like I Love You"	Grant; Kirkpatrick; Thomas	Behind the Eyes	4:30
17.	"I Will Be Your Friend"	Dane DeViller; Sean Hosein; Michelle Lewis	Behind the Eyes	4:00
18.	"Simple Things"	Grant; Dillon O'Brian; William Owsley; Thomas	Simple Things (2003)	3:58
19.	"Baby Baby" (7" Heart in Motion Mix) (bonus track)	Grant; Thomas		3:50

First pressing bonus disc
No.	Title	Writer(s)	Length
1.	"Every Heartbeat" (7″ Body and Soul Mix)	Grant; Kirkpatrick; Peacock	3:20
2.	"That's What Love Is For" (7″ single mix)	Grant; Muller; Omartian	4:20
3.	"I Will Remember You" (rhythm remix)	Chapman; Grant; Thomas	5:05
4.	"House of Love" (Classic Philly Soul Mix)	Barnhill; Greenberg; Wilson	4:35

== Production ==
- Amy Grant – executive producer, photography, liner notes
- Michael Blanton – executive producer
- Jennifer Cooke – executive producer
- Andy McKaie – compilation producer
- Mike Ragogna – compilation producer
- Ed Cash – producer (1)
- Wayne Kirkpatrick – producer (2, 14)
- Michael Omartian – producer (3, 8, 10, 13)
- Brown Bannister – producer (4, 5, 7, 18)
- Keith Thomas – producer (6, 9, 11, 12, 15–17, 19), remix arrangements (11)
- Mark Mazzetti – additional production (13), remixing (13), remix consultant
- John Robert Richards – additional production (13), remixing (13)
- Eric Sarafin – additional production (13), remixing (13)
- Daniel Abraham – additional production (19), mixing (19)
- Dan Marnien – engineer (2), mixing (2)
- Glenn Spinner – assistant engineer (2)
- David Nottingham – mix assistant (2)
- Mark Johnson – remixing (2)
- Keb' Mo' – remixing (2)
- D' Ann McAlister – production assistant (2)
- Barry Korkin – editorial assistant
- Erick Labson – mastering at Universal Mastering Studios (New York, NY)
- Doug Schwartz – assembly
- Adam Abrams – production coordinator
- Adam Starr – product manager
- Susan Browne – design
- Norman Jean Roy – cover photography, photography
- Elka Aoshima – photography
- Justin Loomis – photography
- Kurt Markus – photography
- Victoria Pearson – photography
- Albert Sanchez – photography
- Ryan Null – photo coordinator

Bonus Disc

- Brown Bannister – producer (1)
- Michael Omartian – producer (2, 3)
- Keith Thomas – producer (4)
- Daniel Abraham – additional production (1–3), mixing (1–3)
- Phil Nicolo – remixing (4)
- Mark Mazzetti – remixing (4)

== Charts ==
Year	Chart	Position
2004	The Billboard 200	48
2004	Top Christian Albums	3
2004	Top Internet Albums	13
