= Billboard Year-End Hot 100 singles of 1992 =

Ranking of recorded music

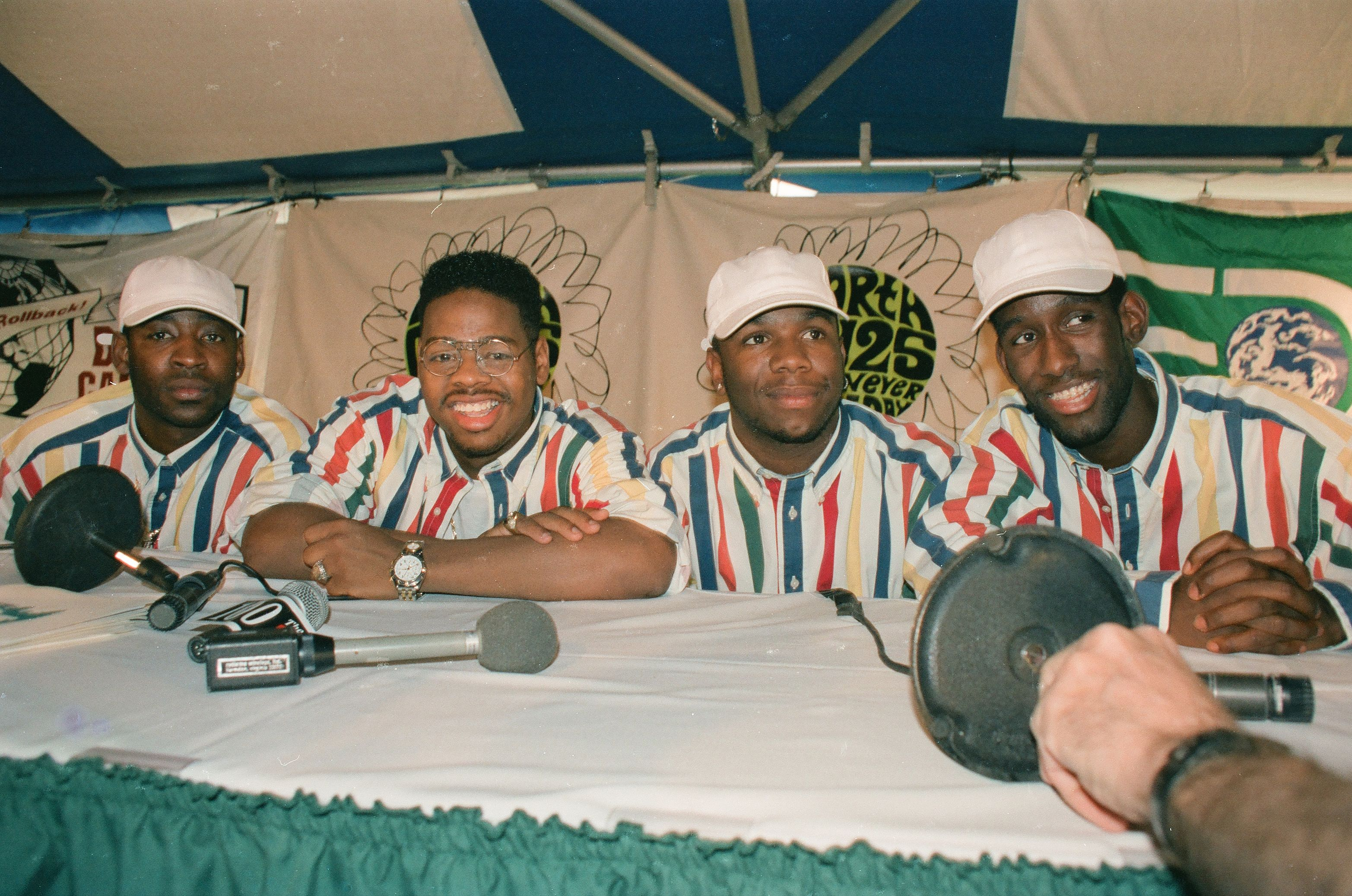
Boyz II Men (pictured) had three songs on the Year-End Hot 100, including "End of the Road", the number one hit song of the year.

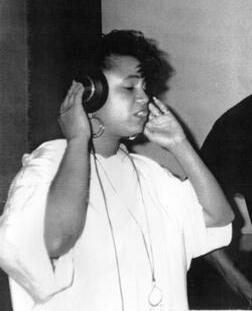
CeCe Peniston had three songs on the Year-End Hot 100 for 1992: "Finally" at number 20, "Keep on Walkin'" at number 61, and "We Got a Love Thang" at number 97.

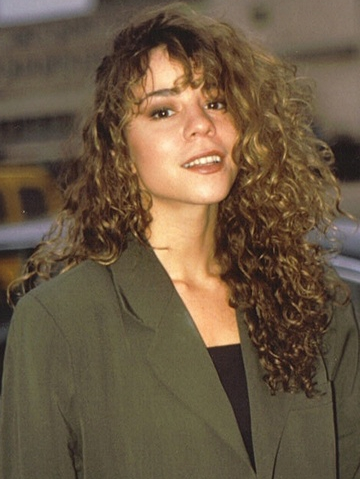
Mariah Carey had three songs on the year-end chart of 1992, the highest-charting of which, "I'll Be There", appeared at number 16.

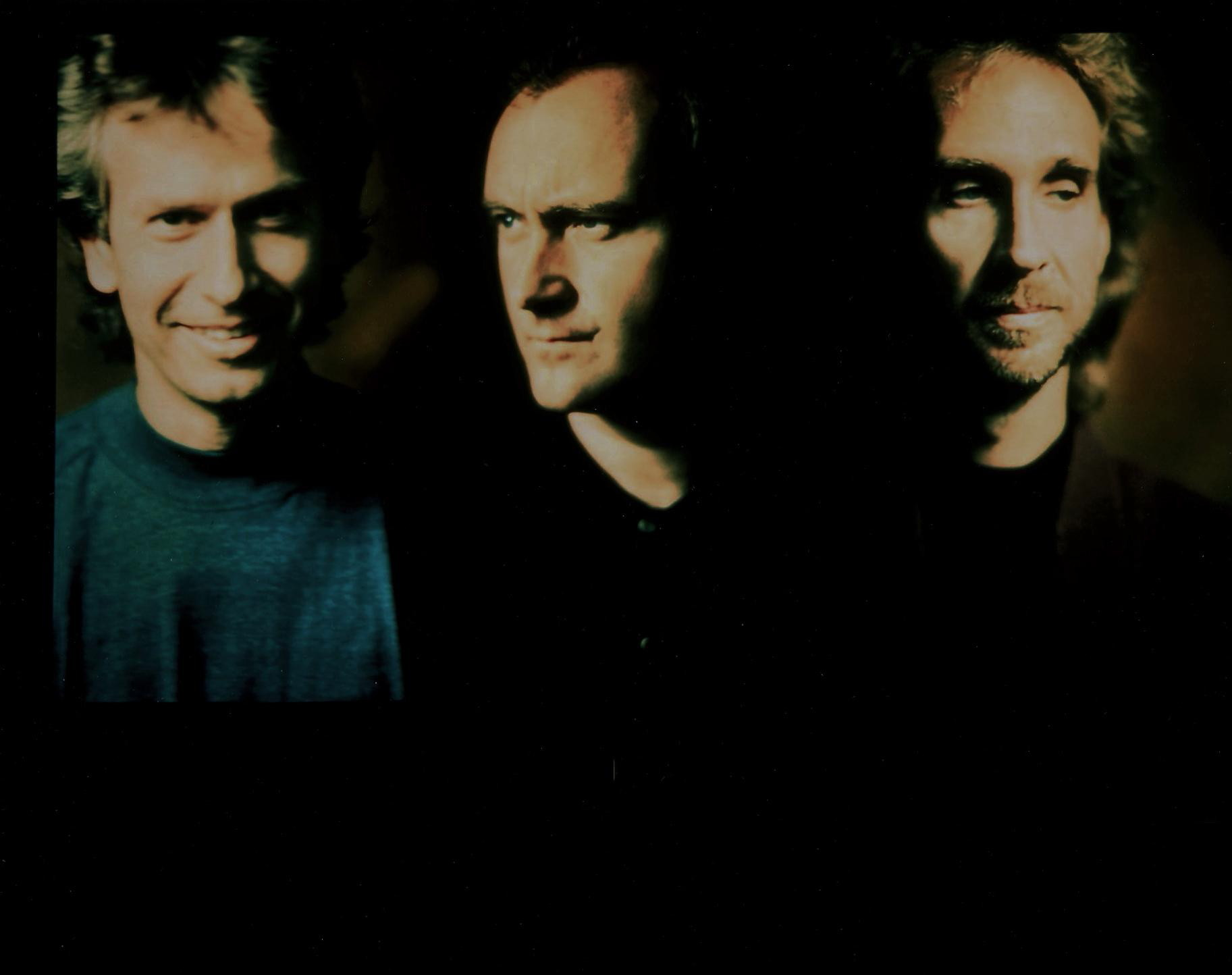
The English band Genesis had three songs from their 1991 album We Can't Dance—"I Can't Dance", "Hold on My Heart", and "No Son of Mine"—on 1992's Year-End Hot 100.

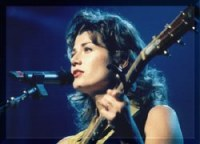
Amy Grant's (pictured in 1998) songs "Good for Me", "That's What Love Is For", and "I Will Remember You" all appeared on 1992's year-end chart.

This is a list of Billboard magazine's Top Hot 100 songs of 1992.

No song that appeared in the 1991 year-end had managed to appear in the 1992 year-end. This is the last time and the only time since the 1989 year-end (which had no YE hits from 1988) there were no repeats.

№	Title	Artist(s)
1	"End of the Road"	Boyz II Men
2	"Baby Got Back"	Sir Mix-a-Lot
3	"Jump"	Kris Kross
4	"Save the Best for Last"	Vanessa Williams
5	"Baby-Baby-Baby"	TLC
6	"Tears in Heaven"	Eric Clapton
7	"My Lovin' (You're Never Gonna Get It)"	En Vogue
8	"Under the Bridge"	Red Hot Chili Peppers
9	"All 4 Love"	Color Me Badd
10	"Just Another Day"	Jon Secada
11	"I Love Your Smile"	Shanice
12	"To Be with You"	Mr. Big
13	"I'm Too Sexy"	Right Said Fred
14	"Black or White"	Michael Jackson
15	"Achy Breaky Heart"	Billy Ray Cyrus
16	"I'll Be There"	Mariah Carey
17	"November Rain"	Guns N' Roses
18	"Life Is a Highway"	Tom Cochrane
19	"Remember the Time"	Michael Jackson
20	"Finally"	CeCe Peniston
21	"This Used to Be My Playground"	Madonna
22	"Sometimes Love Just Ain't Enough"	Patty Smyth and Don Henley
23	"Can't Let Go"	Mariah Carey
24	"Jump Around"	House of Pain
25	"Diamonds and Pearls"	Prince and The New Power Generation
26	"Don't Let the Sun Go Down on Me"	George Michael and Elton John
27	"Masterpiece"	Atlantic Starr
28	"If You Asked Me To"	Celine Dion
29	"Giving Him Something He Can Feel"	En Vogue
30	"Live and Learn"	Joe Public
31	"Come and Talk to Me"	Jodeci
32	"Smells Like Teen Spirit"	Nirvana
33	"Humpin' Around"	Bobby Brown
34	"Damn I Wish I Was Your Lover"	Sophie B. Hawkins
35	"Tell Me What You Want Me to Do"	Tevin Campbell
36	"Ain't 2 Proud 2 Beg"	TLC
37	"It's So Hard to Say Goodbye to Yesterday"	Boyz II Men
38	"Move This"	Technotronic featuring Ya Kid K
39	"Bohemian Rhapsody"	Queen
40	"Tennessee"	Arrested Development
41	"The Best Things in Life Are Free"	Luther Vandross and Janet Jackson
42	"Make It Happen"	Mariah Carey
43	"The One"	Elton John
44	"Set Adrift on Memory Bliss"	P.M. Dawn
45	"Stay"	Shakespears Sister
46	"2 Legit 2 Quit"	Hammer
47	"Please Don't Go"	KWS
48	"Breakin' My Heart (Pretty Brown Eyes)"	Mint Condition
49	"Wishing on a Star"	The Cover Girls
50	"She's Playing Hard to Get"	Hi-Five
51	"I'd Die Without You"	P.M. Dawn
52	"Good for Me"	Amy Grant
53	"All I Want"	Toad the Wet Sprocket
54	"When a Man Loves a Woman"	Michael Bolton
55	"I Can't Dance"	Genesis
56	"Hazard"	Richard Marx
57	"Mysterious Ways"	U2
58	"Too Funky"	George Michael
59	"How Do You Talk to an Angel"	The Heights
60	"One"	U2
61	"Keep on Walkin'"	CeCe Peniston
62	"Hold on My Heart"	Genesis
63	"The Way I Feel About You"	Karyn White
64	"Beauty and the Beast"	Celine Dion and Peabo Bryson
65	"Warm It Up"	Kris Kross
66	"In the Closet"	Michael Jackson
67	"People Everyday"	Arrested Development
68	"No Son of Mine"	Genesis
69	"Wildside"	Marky Mark and the Funky Bunch
70	"Do I Have to Say the Words?"	Bryan Adams
71	"Friday I'm in Love"	The Cure
72	"Everything About You"	Ugly Kid Joe
73	"Blowing Kisses in the Wind"	Paula Abdul
74	"Thought I'd Died and Gone to Heaven"	Bryan Adams
75	"Rhythm Is a Dancer"	Snap!
76	"Addams Groove"	Hammer
77	"Missing You Now"	Michael Bolton
78	"Back to the Hotel"	N2Deep
79	"Everything Changes"	Kathy Troccoli
80	"Have You Ever Needed Someone So Bad"	Def Leppard
81	"Take This Heart"	Richard Marx
82	"When I Look Into Your Eyes"	FireHouse
83	"I Wanna Love You"	Jade
84	"Uhh Ahh"	Boyz II Men
85	"Real Love"	Mary J. Blige
86	"Justified and Ancient"	The KLF
87	"Slow Motion"	Color Me Badd
88	"What About Your Friends"	TLC
89	"Thinkin' Back"	Color Me Badd
90	"Would I Lie to You?"	Charles & Eddie
91	"That's What Love Is For"	Amy Grant
92	"Keep Coming Back"	Richard Marx
93	"Free Your Mind"	En Vogue
94	"Keep It Comin'"	Keith Sweat
95	"Just Take My Heart"	Mr. Big
96	"I Will Remember You"	Amy Grant
97	"We Got a Love Thang"	CeCe Peniston
98	"Let's Get Rocked"	Def Leppard
99	"They Want EFX"	Das EFX
100	"I Can't Make You Love Me"	Bonnie Raitt

== See also ==
- 1992 in music
- List of Billboard Hot 100 number-one singles of 1992
- List of Billboard Hot 100 top-ten singles in 1992
- Billboard Year-End Hot R&B Singles of 1992
- Billboard Year-End Hot Rap Singles of 1992
