= Never Alone (Amy Grant album) =

Studio album by Amy Grant
- Released: June 4, 1980
- Recorded: 1979–1980
- Studios: Gold Mine (Brentwood, Tennessee); Martin Sound (Los Angeles, California)
- Genre: Gospel
- Length: 40:38
- Label: Myrrh
- Producer: Brown Bannister

Amy Grant chronology
My Father's Eyes (1979)	Never Alone (1980)	In Concert (1981)

Professional ratings
Review scores
Source	Rating
AllMusic	2/5 stars
Cross Rhythms	7/10 stars

Never Alone is the third studio album by Christian singer Amy Grant, released in 1980 through Myrrh Records.

By this point in her life, Grant had entered her second year at Furman University and developed a budding relationship with studio songwriter and future husband Gary Chapman. The three songs from the album that they co-wrote obscurely describe their on-again, off-again dating relationship. Although Never Alone was not as popular as its predecessor, the 1979 album My Father's Eyes, it still managed to score a Top Ten Christian hit in "Look What Has Happened to Me".

The album is excluded from Grant's 2007 digital box set The Storyteller Collection, which encompasses all of Grant's non-Christmas studio albums from her 1977 self-titled debut to Simple Things (2003). Legacy... Hymns and Faith (2002) and Rock of Ages... Hymns and Faith (2005), were the other studio albums not included at the time of the box set's release.

== Track listing ==
No.	Title	Writer(s)	Length
1.	"Look What Has Happened to Me"	Brown Bannister, Gary Chapman	3:15
2.	"So Glad"	Amy Grant, Bannister, Chris Christian	4:43
3.	"Walking Away with You"	Grant, Chapman, Christian	4:25
4.	"Family"	Grant	2:44
5.	"Don't Give Up on Me"	Grant, Bannister, Chapman	3:59
6.	"That's the Day"	Bruce Hibbard, Hadley Hockensmith, Kelly Willard	3:43
7.	"If I Have to Die"	Grant	3:48
8.	"All I Ever Have to Be"	Chapman	2:36
9.	"It's a Miracle"	Chapman, Christian	2:45
10.	"Too Late"	Grant, Bannister, Christian	3:14
11.	"First Love"	Dawn Rodgers	2:50
12.	"Say Once More"	Brian Carr, Gwen Moore	2:27

== Personnel ==
Musicians

- Amy Grant – vocals
- Larry Muhoberac – acoustic piano (1, 3, 9, 10)
- Shane Keister – synthesizers (2, 3, 11), acoustic piano (2, 6, 7)
- Trantham Whitley – keyboards (4)
- Thomas Cain – acoustic piano (5)
- Clayton Ivey – Fender Rhodes (5)
- Jerry Roberts – accordion (6)
- Tim May – electric guitar (1, 3, 9, 10)
- Billy Joe Walker Jr. – electric guitar (1, 3, 9, 10), acoustic guitar (4, 11)
- Pete Bordonali – electric guitar (2, 3, 7), classical guitar (8)
- Johnny Christopher – acoustic guitar (2, 4)
- Jimmy Capps – acoustic guitar (4)
- Bruce Dees – electric guitar (5)
- David Hungate – bass guitar (1, 3, 9, 10)
- Jack Williams – bass guitar (2, 7)
- Joe Schmee – bass guitar (4, 11)
- Bob Wray – bass guitar (5)
- Paul Leim – drums (1, 3, 9, 10)
- Clay Caire – drums (2, 7)
- Roger Clark – drums (5)
- Jimmy Maelen – percussion (1)
- Fred Petry – percussion (3, 4)
- Farrell Morris – percussion (4, 7), bass marimba (12)
- Mark Morris – percussion (12)
- Denis Solee – flute (1, 7, 11), saxophone (1, 7), lyricon (8)
- Cindy Reynolds – harp (7)
- Lewis Del Gatto – horns (9)

Music arrangements

- Shane Keister – string arrangements (1, 7)
- John Darnall – string arrangements (2)
- Ronn Huff – string arrangements (3, 8)
- Don Hart – horn arrangements (5)

Background vocalists

- Bruce Dees – backing vocals (1, 3, 5, 9)
- Greg Gordon – backing vocals (1, 9)
- Steve Brantley – backing vocals (3)
- Thomas Cain – backing vocals (3)
- Diana DeWitt – backing vocals (3, 6, 10, 12)
- Brown Bannister – backing vocals (5)
- Patti Leatherwood – backing vocals (5)
- Belinda West – backing vocals (5)
- Gary Chapman – backing vocals (6)
- Gary Pigg – backing vocals (6, 10, 12)

== Production ==
- Michael Blanton – executive producer
- Brown Bannister – producer, mixing
- Jimmy Birch – engineer, mixing
- Jack Joseph Puig – engineer
- Glenn Meadows – mastering at Masterfonics (Nashville, Tennessee)
- Michael Harris – design
- Mike Borum – photography

== Charts ==
=== Weekly charts ===
Year	Chart	Position
1980	Top Inspirational Albums	1

=== End of year charts ===
Year	Chart	Position
1980	U.S. Billboard Inspirational Albums	25
1981	U.S. Billboard Inspirational Albums	5
