= Hope Set High =

Single by Amy Grant

from the album Heart in Motion
- Released: April 11, 1991
- Recorded: 1990
- Studio: Sound House (North Hollywood, CA)
- Genre: Contemporary Christian Music
- Length: 2:50
- Label: A&M, Word Records, EMI Records
- Songwriter: Amy Grant
- Producer: Michael Omartian

Amy Grant singles chronology
"Baby Baby" (1991)	"Hope Set High" (1991)	"Every Heartbeat" (1991)

"Hope Set High" is a 1991 song by American Christian music singer Amy Grant. It was released as the second single from the Heart In Motion album, and the first from the album released to Christian radio.

"Hope Set High" is a downbeat song with heavy use of percussion. Similar to a praise and worship song, the lyrics in "Hope Set High" repeatedly acknowledge God's goodness with the phrase "When it all comes down, if there's anything good that happens in life, it's from Jesus." The song's rhythmic groove was created using a Korg Wavestation, a popular instrument in the music industry at the time.

== Background ==
During the 1980s, Amy Grant achieved enormous success in the contemporary Christian music industry, becoming that genre's best-selling artist. In 1985, she became the first Christian singer to "cross over" with a major hit on mainstream pop radio charts. One year later, she scored her first #1 pop song with "The Next Time I Fall", a duet with Peter Cetera. Her last major project from the 1980s, Lead Me On, was a huge success but its impact was largely limited to Christian radio. With the dawn of the 1990s, however, Grant returned to the mainstream with a tour de force of chart-topping pop hits that became some of the most successful of the new decade. The first single from her pop album, Heart in Motion, became her first #1 song as a solo artist on the Billboard Hot 100. That single, "Baby Baby", angered some of Grant's dedicated Christian music fans, however, as they feared Grant was abandoning the genre.

At the time of Heart in Motion's release, Grant was represented by two record labels, something of an anomaly in the industry. A&M Records marketed her music to mainstream radio and secular retailers. Word Records marketed her music to Christian radio and Christian retailers. While A&M launched Heart in Motion with "Baby Baby" as its debut single, Word Records chose not to market that song to Christian radio. Instead, Word opted to introduce the album to the Christian market with "Hope Set High", a less glitzy song with explicitly Christian-themed lyrics and references to Jesus. A&M did not release or market "Hope Set High" to mainstream radio.

== Personnel ==
- Amy Grant – lead vocals
- Michael Omartian – keyboards, drum sequencing, backing vocals
- Kurt Howell – backing vocals
- Suzanne Schwartz – backing vocals

== Chart success ==
The success of "Hope Set High" on Christian radio mirrored that of "Baby Baby" on mainstream radio in that "Hope Set High" took the #1 spot on the Christian AC charts. A&M Records chose not to release the song to mainstream radio.

== Charts ==
Chart performance for "Hope Set High"
Chart (1991)	Peak position
US CCM Hot Hits	3
US CCM Hot Adult Contemporary	1
