= Jay Gruska =

American songwriter and composer (born 1952)

- Born: April 23, 1952 (age 74); Brooklyn, New York, U.S.
- Occupations: Film composer; television composer; songwriter; music producer; arranger
- Instruments: Piano; keyboards
- Years active: 1974–present
- Spouse(s): Jennifer Williams; Denise Halma Gruska
- Website: jaygruska.com

Jay Gruska (/ˈɡrʌskə/; born April 23, 1952) is an American songwriter and composer best known for his film and television scoring, and for writing hit songs for a variety of artists. He has composed musical scores for dozens of TV dramas, with over 500 hours of shows played internationally.

Gruska has received three Emmy Award nominations, one Genie Award nomination, and eleven ASCAP awards. Some of his best-known scores are for the TV shows Lois & Clark: The New Adventures of Superman, Charmed, and Supernatural.

== Career ==
Gruska started his career as a singer/songwriter. He was briefly a member of Three Dog Night in 1976, replacing Danny Hutton, until the group disbanded. He had recording contracts with ABC Records for his first solo album, and Warner Bros. Records with the band Maxus, for which he was the lead singer and songwriter. Warner Bros. Records later released his second solo album Which One of Us Is Me, which Gruska also produced.

Gruska is also known for co-writing the hit duet "Tell Me I'm Not Dreamin' (Too Good to Be True)", for Jermaine and Michael Jackson, which was #1 on the Billboard dance charts; the Gloria Loring/Carl Anderson duet "Friends and Lovers", which was #2 on the Billboard Pop Charts and was also released in a country version under the title "Both To Each Other (Friends and Lovers)," performed by Juice Newton and Eddie Rabbitt, which was #1 on the Billboard Country charts; and Amy Grant's "Good for Me", which was #1 on the Billboard Adult Contemporary charts.

As a composer on the TV series Supernatural, which aired on The CW, Gruska wrote and produced two songs for the 200th episode, titled "Fan Fiction" (co-writing the lyrics with screenwriter Robbie Thompson). Twenty-four hours after the episode aired, the song "The Road So Far" was #3 on the iTunes soundtrack chart and #57 among all songs on iTunes.

== Personal life ==
Gruska is married to screenwriter, children's author, and lyricist Denise Halma Gruska. They have one son, Eli Raphael Gruska, a professional dancer at New York City Ballet. Gruska was previously married to Jennifer Williams, the daughter of John Williams and Barbara Ruick as well as the sister of Joseph Williams. Together they had two children, Bobby and Ethan Gruska, the members of the pop music duo The Belle Brigade.

== Awards and nominations ==
=== Awards ===
- 2014: ASCAP Film/TV Award - Score, Supernatural
- 2010: ASCAP Film/TV Award - Score, Supernatural
- 1998: ASCAP Film/TV Award - Score, Charmed
- 1993: ASCAP Pop Award - "Good for Me"
- 1988: ASCAP Country Award - "Friends & Lovers (Both to Each Other)"
- 1988: ASCAP Pop Award - "Friends & Lovers (Both to Each Other)"
- 1987: ASCAP Country Award - "Friends & Lovers (Both to Each Other)"
- 1987: ASCAP Pop Award - "Friends & Lovers (Both to Each Other)"

=== Nominations ===
- 2000: Emmy Award nomination - Best Original Score, Falcone
- 2000: Emmy Award Nomination - Best Main Title Theme Music, Falcone
- 1996: Golden Reel Nomination - Music, Lois & Clark: The New Adventures of Superman
- 1995: Golden Reel Nomination - Music, Lois & Clark: The New Adventures of Superman
- 1994: Golden Reel Nomination - Music, Lois & Clark: The New Adventures of Superman
- 1994: Emmy Award Nomination - Best Main Title Theme Music, Lois & Clark: The New Adventures of Superman
- 1989: Genie Award for Best Original Song nomination - Shadow Dancing

== Discography ==
=== Solo releases ===
- Gruska on Gruska (1974)
- Which One of Us Is Me (1984)

=== With Three Dog Night ===
- American Pastime (1976)

=== With Maxus ===
- Maxus (1981)

== Film and television ==
Project title	Project type	Credit and notes
The Winchesters	TV series	Composer, alternating episodes with Philip White
Supernatural	TV series	Composer, alternating episodes with Christopher Lennertz
Ruby & the Rockits	TV series	Composer, songwriter, and music producer
Charmed	TV series	Composer
Wildfire	TV series	Composer
Hack	TV series	Composer
War Stories	TV movie	Composer
The Division	TV series	Composer
That's Life	TV series	Composer
Beverly Hills, 90210	TV series	Composer
Bellyfruit	Film	Composer
Falcone	TV series	Composer
Waiting for Woody	Short	Composer
Lois & Clark: The New Adventures of Superman	TV series	Composer
Charlie Grace	TV series	Composer
Courthouse	TV series	Composer
Trapped in Space	TV movie	Composer
Saved by the Bell: Wedding in Las Vegas	TV movie	Composer
A Time to Heal	TV movie	Composer
Dying to Remember	TV movie	Composer
Without Warning: Terror in the Towers	TV movie	Composer
Sisters	TV series	Composer
Mo' Money	Film	Composer
Baby of the Bride	TV movie	Composer
Child of Darkness, Child of Light	TV movie	Composer
Another Pair of Aces: Three of a Kind	TV movie	Composer
Nightmare on the 13th Floor	TV movie	Composer
Against the Law	TV series	Composer
The World's Oldest Living Bridesmaid	TV movie	Composer
Wheels of Terror	TV movie	Composer
thirtysomething	TV series	Composer
Sing	Film	Composer
Shadow Dancing	Film	Composer
The Principal	Film	Composer
"David Cassidy: Man Undercover"	TV series	Composer (with David Cassidy)
The Great Defender	TV series	Composer
Cocoon	Film	Arranger and producer
Commando	Film	Music producer
The Cutting Edge	Film	Songwriter (with Danny O'Keefe) and producer for "Turning Circles", performed by Sally Dworsky
Adventures in Babysitting	Film	Songwriter (with Barry Goldberg), arranger, and producer for "Just Can't Stop", performed by Percy Sledge
Stella	Film	Songwriter (with Paul Gordon) for "One More Cheer", performed by Bette Midler

== Songwriting credits ==
Song title	Album	Artist	Credit and notes
"Good for Me"	Heart in Motion	Amy Grant	Co-songwriter with Tom Snow (lyrics by Amy Grant and Wayne Kirkpatrick). Quadruple platinum album. #1 on AOR Charts. #8 Billboard Hot 100.
"Tell Me I'm Not Dreaming"	Jermaine Jackson: Dynamite	Jermaine Jackson and Michael Jackson	Co-songwriter with Michael Omartian and Bruce Sudano. Gold album. Three weeks at #1 on Billboard dance chart.
"Friends and Lovers"	Carl Anderson	Carl Anderson and Gloria Loring	Co-songwriter with Paul Gordon. #1 on AC charts. #2 on pop charts. 900,000 singles sold.
"Both to Each Other"	Rabbit Trax & Great Hills	Eddie Rabbitt and Juice Newton	Co-songwriter with Paul Gordon. #1 on country charts.
"What You're Missing"	Chicago 16	Chicago	Co-songwriter with Joseph Williams. Double platinum album.
"Turning Circles"	The Cutting Edge soundtrack	Sally Dworsky	Co-songwriter (with Danny O'Keefe) and producer
"Just Can't Stop"	Adventures in Babysitting soundtrack	Percy Sledge	Co-songwriter (with Barry Goldberg), arranger, and producer
"One More Cheer"	Stella soundtrack	Bette Midler	Co-songwriter (with Paul Gordon)
