= My Father's Eyes =

My Father's Eyes may refer to:

- "My Father's Eyes" (song), a 1998 song by Eric Clapton
- "My Father's Eyes", a 1999 song by Phil Driscoll
- My Father's Eyes (album), a 1979 album by Amy Grant
