= List of Billboard Hot 100 number ones of 1992 =

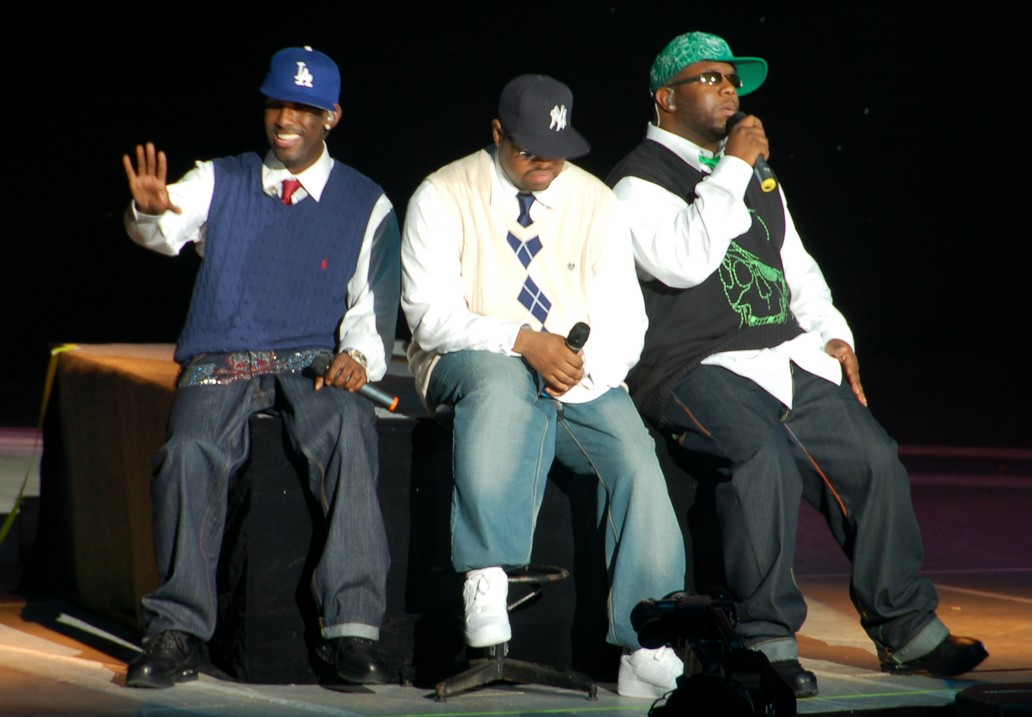
Boyz II Men (pictured) earned their first Hot 100 number-one single with "End of the Road", which stayed at the top position for thirteen straight weeks.

This is a list of the U.S. Billboard magazine Hot 100 number-ones of 1992. The longest running number-one single of 1992 is "I Will Always Love You" by Whitney Houston, which stayed at the top of the chart for 14 weeks. "I Will Always Love You" became the longest running song at number one when it reached 14 weeks, breaking the record that Boyz II Men's "End of the Road" had just set at 13 weeks.

"End of the Road" broke the record previously set at 11 weeks by Elvis Presley in 1956 with "Hound Dog"/"Don't Be Cruel". "I Will Always Love You" would hold the record as the longest-running song atop the Hot 100 until "One Sweet Day" by Mariah Carey and Boyz II Men topped the chart for 16 weeks in 1995.

Although "I Will Always Love You" spent nine of its weeks atop the Hot 100 in 1993, it is considered the longest-running song of 1992 because that is when its run began.

A total of 12 songs topped the Hot 100, a record low since its debut in 1958. (Over 25 songs were number one each year from 1985 to 1991.) This is also the most recent year in which no artist had more than one song hit the No. 1 spot.

That year, 7 acts earned their first number one song: Right Said Fred, Mr. Big, Vanessa Williams, Kris Kross, Sir Mix-a-Lot, Boyz II Men, and The Heights.

== Chart history ==
Key
The yellow background indicates the #1 song on Billboard's 1992 Year-End Chart of Pop Singles.

No.	Issue date	Song	Artist(s)	Ref.
762	January 4	"Black or White"	Michael Jackson	
762	January 11	"Black or White"	Michael Jackson	
762	January 18	"Black or White"	Michael Jackson	
763	January 25	"All 4 Love"	Color Me Badd	
764	February 1	"Don't Let the Sun Go Down on Me"	George Michael and Elton John	
765	February 8	"I'm Too Sexy"	Right Said Fred	
765	February 15	"I'm Too Sexy"	Right Said Fred	
765	February 22	"I'm Too Sexy"	Right Said Fred	
766	February 29	"To Be with You"	Mr. Big	
766	March 7	"To Be with You"	Mr. Big	
766	March 14	"To Be with You"	Mr. Big	
767	March 21	"Save the Best for Last"	Vanessa Williams	
767	March 28	"Save the Best for Last"	Vanessa Williams	
767	April 4	"Save the Best for Last"	Vanessa Williams	
767	April 11	"Save the Best for Last"	Vanessa Williams	
767	April 18	"Save the Best for Last"	Vanessa Williams	
768	April 25	"Jump"	Kris Kross	
768	May 2	"Jump"	Kris Kross	
768	May 9	"Jump"	Kris Kross	
768	May 16	"Jump"	Kris Kross	
768	May 23	"Jump"	Kris Kross	
768	May 30	"Jump"	Kris Kross	
768	June 6	"Jump"	Kris Kross	
768	June 13	"Jump"	Kris Kross	
769	June 20	"I'll Be There"	Mariah Carey	
769	June 27	"I'll Be There"	Mariah Carey	
770	July 4	"Baby Got Back"	Sir Mix-a-Lot	
770	July 11	"Baby Got Back"	Sir Mix-a-Lot	
770	July 18	"Baby Got Back"	Sir Mix-a-Lot	
770	July 25	"Baby Got Back"	Sir Mix-a-Lot	
770	August 1	"Baby Got Back"	Sir Mix-a-Lot	
771	August 8	"This Used to Be My Playground"	Madonna	
772	August 15	"End of the Road"	Boyz II Men	
772	August 22	"End of the Road"	Boyz II Men	
772	August 29	"End of the Road"	Boyz II Men	
772	September 5	"End of the Road"	Boyz II Men	
772	September 12	"End of the Road"	Boyz II Men	
772	September 19	"End of the Road"	Boyz II Men	
772	September 26	"End of the Road"	Boyz II Men	
772	October 3	"End of the Road"	Boyz II Men	
772	October 10	"End of the Road"	Boyz II Men	
772	October 17	"End of the Road"	Boyz II Men	
772	October 24	"End of the Road"	Boyz II Men	
772	October 31	"End of the Road"	Boyz II Men	
772	November 7	"End of the Road"	Boyz II Men	
773	November 14	"How Do You Talk to an Angel"	The Heights	
773	November 21	"How Do You Talk to an Angel"	The Heights	
774	November 28	"I Will Always Love You"	Whitney Houston	
774	December 5	"I Will Always Love You"	Whitney Houston	
774	December 12	"I Will Always Love You"	Whitney Houston	
774	December 19	"I Will Always Love You"	Whitney Houston	
774	December 26	"I Will Always Love You"	Whitney Houston	

== Number-one artists ==
List of number-one artists by total weeks at number one
Position	Artist	Weeks at No. 1
1	Boyz II Men	13
2	Kris Kross	8
3	Vanessa Williams	5
3	Sir Mix-A-Lot	5
3	Whitney Houston	5
6	Right Said Fred	3
6	Mr. Big	3
8	Mariah Carey	2
8	The Heights	2
10	Color Me Badd	1
10	George Michael	1
10	Elton John	1
10	Madonna	1

== See also ==
- 1992 in music
- List of Billboard number-one singles
- List of Billboard Hot 100 number-one singles of the 1990s

== Additional sources ==
- Fred Bronson's Billboard Book of Number 1 Hits, 5th Edition (ISBN 0-8230-7677-6)
- Joel Whitburn's Top Pop Singles 1955-2008, 12 Edition (ISBN 0-89820-180-2)
- Joel Whitburn Presents the Billboard Hot 100 Charts: The Nineties (ISBN 0-89820-137-3)
- Additional information obtained can be verified within Billboard's online archive services and print editions of the magazine.
