= Baby Baby (Amy Grant song) =

1991 single by Amy Grant

- Artwork for US CD single

Single by Amy Grant

from the album Heart in Motion
- B-side: "Lead Me On"
- Released: January 18, 1991
- Studio: The Bennet House (Franklin, Tennessee); Quad (Nashville, Tennessee)
- Genre: Pop rock
- Length: 3:57
- Label: A&M
- Songwriters: Keith Thomas; Amy Grant
- Producer: Keith Thomas

Amy Grant singles chronology
"'Tis So Sweet to Trust in Jesus" (1989)	"Baby Baby" (1991)	"Hope Set High" (1991)

Music video
- "Baby Baby" on YouTube

"Baby Baby" is a pop song by American recording artist Amy Grant and it was issued as the first single from her eighth studio album, Heart in Motion (1991). The song was written by Grant and Keith Thomas, who also produced it. It was released on January 18, 1991, through A&M Records and topped the US Billboard Hot 100 chart for two consecutive weeks in April 1991, becoming the first in a string of hits from Heart in Motion. At the 34th Annual Grammy Awards in 1992, the song received three Grammy Award nominations, including Song of the Year and Record of the Year. Its music video was directed by D.J. Webster and first aired in March 1991.

== Background ==
The music was written by Keith Thomas. Grant had foreseen the song's success, and requested that Thomas write the song. He complied under the only condition that the song would be titled "Baby Baby". Grant experienced difficulty in writing the lyrics; she attempted to write a romantic-sounding song but could not prevent it from sounding like "some overgrown football jock with no vocabulary trying desperately to be romantic". Later, she came to inspiration upon having seen her six-week-old daughter Millie. In the Heart in Motion booklet are the words: This song is dedicated to Millie, whose six-week-old face was my inspiration. Millie would also appear on stage during Grant's performance at the 34th Grammy Awards.

== Composition ==
"Baby Baby"
The first 32 seconds of Amy Grant's "Baby Baby"

The song is almost four minutes in length and is composed in the key of F-sharp major, set in the time signature of 4/4 common time with a moderate tempo of 98 beats per minute. In the middle of the song, the key is changed to A-flat major, then for a short amount of time goes back to F♯ major and finally ends with A♭ major. Grant's vocal range spans from F_{3} to D♯_{5}.

The song consists of three verses that are interrupted by a bridge, "'Stop for a minute, baby I'm so glad you're mine". Lyrically, the song praises that special someone and expresses love that started since the day her heart was "put in motion". The chorus is the source of the album's title: "And ever since the day you put my heart in motion, baby I realized that there's just no gettin' over you". It fades out with the lyrics:

Don't stop givin' love
Don't stop, no
(Baby I'm so glad)
Glad that you're mine
Baby I'm glad

== Critical reception ==
Pan-European magazine Music & Media wrote that Grant "still sounds grand on this danceable pop tune." In their review of the Heart in Motion album, Music & Media complimented "Baby Baby" as "heavenly". James Hamilton from Record Mirror commented, "With a coincidentally apt catalogue number, the white gospel superstar's US chart topping secular smash is a catchy pop song on radio but becomes a hard "choon" on 12-inch in its chunkily chugged jiggly jogging 98–0bpm Heart In Motion Mix, with a poppier rolling No Getting Over You Mix too."

== Chart performance ==
"Baby Baby" was Amy Grant's biggest hit since her 1986 duet with Peter Cetera, "The Next Time I Fall". In the United States, "Baby Baby" became Grant's second number-one hit on the pop charts and her first as a solo artist, topping the Billboard Hot 100 (replacing Wilson Phillips' "You're in Love" from the top spot) and Adult Contemporary charts for two and three weeks, respectively. It also made Grant the first Christian pop singer to have a number-one single in the United States. The single reached the Top Ten in ten countries, in addition to reaching No. 11 in Switzerland. In the United Kingdom, "Baby Baby" was the singer's first (and only) Top Five hit in that country, reaching No. 2 in the UK Singles Chart. "Baby Baby" went on to become Grant's biggest hit single and one of the most successful singles of 1991.

== Music video ==
=== Development and release ===
Grant singing and dancing along with her on-screen love interest, played by Jme Stein.

The accompanying music video for "Baby Baby" was directed by D.J. Webster. and edited by Scott C. Wilson. According to Webster, the video's main idea was to create a picture of the relationship that everybody wants. Grant added, "I think when you get film where there is a good sense of humor and mutual respect and people are just having a good time, everybody wants a piece of that". Its beginning features Grant receiving attention from other men, and her staying loyal to her lover, portrayed by model Jme Stein (who also appeared in her other video from that album "Good for Me"). At some point Stein is seen singing along with Grant and at the end lip-syncing to the words "Baby I'm so glad". The rest of the video features the couple having fun together.

=== Release and reception ===
The video first aired in March 1991, although MTV didn't air it until it had become too popular not to. A music critic J.D. Considine praised the video, writing that "the Baby Baby clip defines the way most of us imagine her. It was hardly typical video fare, with no special effects or distant locales; all it offered was Grant and a good-looking guy cavorting and acting pretty as she lip-synced to the song. Yet there was something genuinely appealing about the image it conveyed, something that made viewers want to see the thing again". It received a nomination for Best Female Video at the 1991 MTV Video Music Awards, but lost to Janet Jackson's "Love Will Never Do".

The single is available on the 1992 music video tape The Heart in Motion Video Collection and 2004 music video DVD Greatest Videos 1986–2004. A live performance is available on the 2006 DVD Time Again… Amy Grant Live.

== Track listings ==
- US retail 7-inch single and US retail cassette single
1. "Baby Baby" (LP version) – 3:56
2. "Baby Baby" (7-inch Heart in Motion mix) – 3:50
- US retail CD single
1. "Baby Baby" (7-inch Heart in Motion mix) – 3:50
2. "Baby Baby" (12-inch Heart in Motion mix) – 6:02
3. "Lead Me On" (LP version) – 5:36
- International 7-inch single and Australian CD single
1. "Baby Baby" (7-inch No Getting over You mix) – 4:01
2. "Lead Me On" – 5:36
- UK retail CD single
1. "Baby Baby" (7-inch No Getting over You mix) – 4:01
2. "Baby Baby" (12-inch Heart in Motion mix) – 6:01
3. "Lead Me On" – 5:36
- Dave Audé Remixes digital single (2014)
1. "Baby Baby" (featuring Dave Audé) [radio edit] – 3:59
2. "Baby Baby" (featuring Dave Audé) [extended mix] – 5:23
3. "Baby Baby" (featuring Dave Audé) [dub] – 4:55

== Personnel ==
Personnel are adapted from the Heart in Motion booklet.

- Amy Grant – lead vocals
- Keith Thomas – synthesizers, bass, drum programming
- Brian Tankersley – additional synthesizer programming
- Jerry McPherson – guitars
- VickI Hampton – backing vocals
- Ron Hemby – backing vocals
- Donna McElroy – backing vocals

Production

- Keith Thomas – producer, arrangements
- Todd Moore – production assistant, assistant engineer
- Bill Whittington – recording engineer
- Todd Culross – assistant engineer
- Kelly Pribble – assistant engineer
- Brian Malouf – mixing
- Pat MacDougal – mix assistant
- Daniel Abraham – additional production and remix ("Heart in Motion" 7-inch and 12-inch mixes, "No Getting over You" 7-inch and 12-inch mixes)

== Charts ==
=== Weekly charts ===
Weekly chart performance for "Baby Baby"
Chart (1991)	Peak position
Australia (ARIA)	5
Austria (Ö3 Austria Top 40)	7
Belgium (Ultratop 50 Flanders)	17
Canada Top Singles (RPM)	2
Canada Adult Contemporary (RPM)	1
Canada Dance/Urban (RPM)	4
Canada (The Record)	2
Denmark (IFPI)	10
Europe (Eurochart Hot 100)	7
Europe (European Hit Radio)	5
Germany (GfK)	8
Ireland (IRMA)	7
Luxembourg (Radio Luxembourg)	1
Netherlands (Dutch Top 40)	31
Netherlands (Single Top 100)	23
New Zealand (Recorded Music NZ)	2
Norway (VG-lista)	6
Sweden (Sverigetopplistan)	5
Switzerland (Schweizer Hitparade)	11
UK Singles (Official Charts)	2
UK Airplay (Music Week)	1
US Billboard Hot 100	1
US Adult Contemporary (Billboard)	1
US Dance Club Songs (Billboard)	23
US Cash Box Top 100	1

Weekly chart performance for "Baby Baby" (featuring Dave Audé)
Chart (2014)	Peak position
US Dance Club Songs (Billboard)	3
US Hot Dance/Electronic Songs (Billboard)	28

Weekly chart performance for "Baby Baby" (featuring Tori Kelly)
Chart (2016)	Peak position
US Hot Christian Songs (Billboard)	8

=== Year-end charts ===
Year-end chart performance for "Baby Baby"
Chart (1991)	Position
Australia (ARIA)	31
Canada Top Singles (RPM)	15
Canada Adult Contemporary (RPM)	7
Canada Dance/Urban (RPM)	41
Europe (Eurochart Hot 100)	38
Europe (European Hit Radio)	23
Germany (Media Control)	45
New Zealand (RIANZ)	26
Sweden (Topplistan)	30
UK Singles (OCC)	25
US Billboard Hot 100	10
US Adult Contemporary (Billboard)	2
US Cash Box Top 100	7

== Certifications ==
Certifications and sales for "Baby Baby"
Region	Certification	Certified units/sales
Australia (ARIA)	Gold	35,000^{^}
New Zealand (RMNZ)	Gold	5,000^{*}
United Kingdom (BPI)	Silver	200,000^{^}
^{*} Sales figures based on certification alone.^{^} Shipments figures based on certification alone.

== Release history ==
Release dates and formats for "Baby Baby"
Region	Date	Format(s)	Label(s)	Ref.
Europe	January 18, 1991	7-inch vinyl; CD	A&M	
Australia	April 15, 1991	7-inch vinyl; cassette	A&M; Polydor	
United Kingdom	April 29, 1991	7-inch vinyl; 12-inch vinyl	A&M	
Australia	May 27, 1991	CD	A&M; Polydor	
Japan	July 1, 1992	CD (with "Every Heartbeat")	A&M	

== Legacy ==
The song received three Grammy nominations for Best Female Pop Vocal Performance and Song of the Year, but lost in both categories to Bonnie Raitt's "Something to Talk About" and Natalie Cole's "Unforgettable", respectively.

"Baby Baby" was covered by The Swirling Eddies on the 1996 album Sacred Cows.

Grant recorded an updated version of the song with pop artist Tori Kelly. Released on April 29, 2016, it commemorates the song's 25th anniversary. Hollyn released her single "Nothin' on You" the same year, which heavily samples "Baby Baby".
