= Move This =

Single by Technotronic featuring Ya Kid K

from the album The Greatest Hits
- Released: 1992
- Genre: Eurodance; hip house; world beat
- Length: 5:19 (album version - cold end); 5:02 (album version - fade); 3:45 (Bogaert’s 7” remix); 3:40 (hit mix)
- Label: ARS Entertainment Belgium; SBK Records (US)
- Songwriters: Manuela Kamosi; Jo Bogaert
- Producer: Jo Bogaert

Technotronic featuring Ya Kid K singles chronology
"Money Makes the World Go Round" (1991)	"Move This" (1992)	"Hey Yoh, Here We Go" (1993)

Music video
- "Move This" on YouTube

"Move This" is a song by Belgian electronic music project Technotronic featuring Ya Kid K, who co-wrote the lyrics with producer Jo Bogaert. Recorded in 1989 and appearing on Technotronic's debut album, Pump Up the Jam: The Album (1989), the song was re-recorded and included on The Greatest Hits (1993). It peaked at No. 6 on the US Billboard Hot 100, becoming their third and final top-ten hit. The accompanying music video was directed by The Kahn Brothers. "Move This" is featured in the motion picture Let's Go to Prison, starring Will Arnett and Dax Shepard, and the King of the Hill episode "Dances with Dogs". The song was also used by Revlon in a series of TV commercials in 1992.

== Critical reception ==
In 1992, Larry Flick from Billboard magazine noted that the "pop-juiced hip-houser" was first heard on Technotronic's Pump Up the Jam album in 1989. He wrote, "Resurrection via a Revlon TV commercial has sparked heavy pop radio interest. Ya Kid K's rhymes are appropriately cute'n'clever, and the beats and melody are strong enough to withstand heavy competition." BuzzFeed ranked it number 35 in their list of "The 101 Greatest Dance Songs of the '90s" in 2017. Harry Sumrall from Knight Ridder felt it has "the female-group sound of the '60s with a house update". Diana Valois from The Morning Call described it as "a sunny blend of subtle African world beat and house music".

== Track listings ==
- 12-inch vinyl, US (1992)

A. "Move This" (LP Version)
B. "Pump Up the Jam" (And The Jam Is Pumpin) (Terry Dome Mix)

- 12-inch vinyl, France (1992)

A1. "Move This" (Bogaert's 7" Remix) — 3:47
A2. "Move This" (Electrolux Mix) — 5:18
B1. "Move This" (Radiolux Mix) — 3:26
B2. "Move This" (Instrumental) — 3:47

- CD maxi-single, Benelux (1992)
1. "Move This" (Bogaert's 7" Remix) — 3:47
2. "Move This" (Electrolux Mix) — 5:18
3. "Move This" (Instrumental) — 3:47
4. "Move This" (Original Album Mix) — 5:00
- Cassette single, Canada (1992)

A1. "Move This" — 3:38
A2. "Rockin' Over the Beat" (Rockin' Over Manchester Hacienda Edit) — 3:46
B1. "Move This" — 3:38
B2. "Rockin' Over the Beat" (Rockin' Over Manchester Hacienda Edit) — 3:46

== Charts ==
Chart performance for "Move This"
Chart (1992–1993)	Peak position
Australia (ARIA)	67
Canada (RPM)	30
Israel (Israeli Singles Chart)	17
Quebec (ADISQ)	21
US Billboard Hot 100	6
US Cash Box Top 100	12
Zimbabwe (ZIMA)	1
