= My Father's Eyes (album) =

Studio album by Amy Grant
- Released: April 20, 1979
- Recorded: 1978–1979
- Studios: Gold Mine (Brentwood, Tennessee)
- Genre: Gospel
- Length: 37:43
- Label: Myrrh
- Producer: Brown Bannister

Amy Grant chronology
Amy Grant (1977)	My Father's Eyes (1979)	Never Alone (1980)

Professional ratings
Review scores
Source	Rating
AllMusic	3.5/5 stars
Cross Rhythms	8/10 stars
The Encyclopedia of Popular Music	3/5 stars
The Rolling Stone Album Guide	3/5 stars

My Father's Eyes is the second studio album by then-teenage Christian singer-songwriter Amy Grant, released in 1979 on Myrrh Records. My Father's Eyes was a turning point in Grant's career. It gave Amy her first Christian number-one hit in the title track, as well as the Top Ten Christian hit "Faith Walkin' People." The album was nominated for the Grammy Award for Best Gospel Performance, Contemporary. It was certified gold in 1987.

In 2007, like many other albums by Grant, My Father's Eyes was reissued by Sparrow Records, her current label.

== Track listing ==
No.	Title	Writer(s)	Length
1.	"Father's Eyes"	Gary Chapman	4:03
2.	"Faith Walkin' People"	Amy Grant, Brown Bannister	3:26
3.	"Always the Winner"	Grant	3:28
4.	"Never Give You Up"	Grant, Bannister, Marie Tomlinson	3:20
5.	"Bridegroom"	Marty McCall, Meggan Moorhead	2:48
6.	"Lay Down (The Burden of Your Heart)"	Jesse Winchester	2:44
7.	"You Were There"	Stephanie Boosahda, David Stearman	2:29
8.	"O Sacred Head"	Paul Gerhardt, James Waddel Alexander, Hans Leo Hassler	2:04
9.	"All That I Need Is You"	Grant	3:30
10.	"Fairytale"	Grant, Bannister	3:11
11.	"Giggle"	Grant	2:59
12.	"There Will Never Be Another"	Grant, Bannister	3:37
13.	"Keep It on Going"	Grant	1:04

== Personnel ==
- Amy Grant – vocals
- Bobby Ogdin – keyboards, (1–3, 7, 9), acoustic piano (6), Fender Rhodes (10), ARP synthesizer (11)
- Shane Keister – Polymoog (2), organ (6), Moog synthesizer (10)
- Randy Goodrum – keyboards (4), ARP synthesizer (10)
- Marty McCall – keyboards (5), harmony vocals (5), backing vocals (7, 9)
- Jon Goin – acoustic guitar (1, 4, 12), electric guitar (1, 7, 9, 10), guitars (5)
- Larry Byrom – electric guitar (2, 4), guitars (3), acoustic guitar (6, 10), banjo (11)
- Ron Elder – acoustic guitar (3)
- Steve Schaffer – bass (1)
- Bob Wray – bass (2, 3, 6, 7, 9, 11)
- Jack Williams – bass (4, 10)
- Bob Sinkovic – bass (5)
- Roger Clark – drums (1–4, 6, 7, 9–11), percussion (1)
- Lanny Avery – Syndrum (3), drums (5); cords, spoons, snaps, snare drum and jaw pops (13)
- Farrell Morris – percussion (2, 9), xylophone (11)
- Denis Solee – flute (1, 5, 11), piccolo (5)
- Ann Fuller Wilder – oboe (4)
- Kurt Storey – fiddle (5)
- Ava Aldridge – backing vocals (4, 7, 9, 13)
- Lenny LeBlanc – backing vocals (4, 13), harmony vocals (6)
- Marie Tomlinson – backing vocals (4, 7, 9, 13)
- Brown Bannister – backing vocals (8), harmony vocals (12)
- Steve Chapman – backing vocals (8)
- Mimi Verner – backing vocals (8)
- Carol Grant – backing vocals (8)
- Kathy Harrell – backing vocals (8)
- Tim Fletcher – backing vocals (8)
- Randy Elder – backing vocals (8)

Production

- Michael Blanton – executive producer
- Chris Christian – executive producer
- Brown Bannister – producer
- Glenn Meadows – mastering at Masterfonics (Nashville, Tennessee)
- Buddy Skipper – horn arrangements
- Bergen White – string arrangements
- John Miller – photography
- Hot Graphics – album cover design
- Amy Grant – liner notes

== Charts ==
=== Weekly charts ===
Year	Chart	Position
1980	Inspirational Albums	1

=== End of year charts ===
Year	Chart	Position
1980	U.S. Billboard Inspirational Albums	3
1981	U.S. Billboard Inspirational Albums	3
1982	U.S. Billboard Inspirational Albums	7
