= Amy Grant (album) =

Studio album by Amy Grant
- Released: February 3, 1977
- Recorded: 1976
- Studios: Gold Mine (Brentwood, Tennessee); Sound Stage (Nashville, Tennessee); Morgan (London, UK)
- Genres: Gospel, contemporary Christian music
- Length: 36:33
- Label: Myrrh
- Producer: Chris Christian

Amy Grant chronology
Amy Grant (1977)	My Father's Eyes (1979)

Alternate cover
- 1985 reissue cover

Professional ratings
Review scores
Source	Rating
AllMusic	4.5/5 stars
Cross Rhythms	6/10 stars

Amy Grant is the debut studio album by Christian singer Amy Grant, released in 1977 on Myrrh Records. Three songs from the album made Top Ten Christian radio airplay: "Old Man's Rubble", "Beautiful Music", and "What a Difference You've Made". The latter track was made more famous by country singer Ronnie Milsap, as "What a Difference You've Made in My Life".

== Track listing ==
No.	Title	Writer(s)	Length
1.	"Beautiful Music"	Lanier Ferguson	3:10
2.	"Mountain Top"	Brown Bannister	3:39
3.	"Psalm 104"	NASB, Willis Farris	3:27
4.	"Old Man's Rubble"	Bannister	2:57
5.	"Brand New Start"	Amy Grant	2:53
6.	"Grape, Grape Joy"	Grant	1:11
7.	"Walking in the Light"	Grant	1:38
8.	"What a Difference You've Made"	Archie Jordan	3:26
9.	"Father"	Grant	3:55
10.	"I Know Better Now"	Grant	2:49
11.	"The Lord Has a Will"	Mike Hudson, Barbara Hudson	2:38
12.	"On and On"	Grant, Bannister	3:20
13.	"He Gave Me a New Song"	Grant	1:22

== Music personnel ==
- Amy Grant – vocals
- Randy Goodrum – keyboards
- Shane Keister – keyboards
- Brown Bannister – acoustic guitar, bells
- Steve Chapman – acoustic guitar
- Ron Elder – acoustic guitar
- Pete Bordonali – electric guitar
- Joe Wilson – electric guitar
- Reggie Young – electric guitar
- Steve Schaffer – bass guitar
- Joe Osborn – bass guitar
- Larrie Londin – drums
- Kenny Malone – drums
- Lanny Avery – drums
- Jerry Carrigan – drums
- Bobby Taylor – oboe
- Denis Solee – clarinet, flute, saxophones
- Dennis Good – saxophones, trombone
- Roger Bissell – trombone
- George Cunningham – trumpet
- Don Sheffield – trumpet
- Bergen White – horn and string arrangements (1–6, 8–13)
- Mark Price – horn and string arrangements (7)
- Sheldon Kurland Strings – strings
- Chris Harris – backing vocals
- Cindy Lipford – backing vocals
- Marty McCall – backing vocals
- Gwen Moore – backing vocals
- Gary Pigg – backing vocals

Production

- Chris Christian – producer
- Brown Bannister – co-producer, liner notes, engineer, mixing
- Warren Peterson – overdub engineer
- Wade Jaynes – assistant engineer
- Lanny Avery – assistant engineer
- Glenn Meadows – mastering at Masterfonics (Nashville, Tennessee)
- Charles Wallis, Inc. – original cover design
- Patrick Pollei – original cover design
- Michael Harris Design – design
- Michael Borum – photography

== Charts ==
=== Weekly charts ===
Year	Chart	Position
1980	US Top Inspirational Albums	12

=== End of year charts ===
Year	Chart	Position
1980	U.S. Billboard Inspirational Albums	14
1981	U.S. Billboard Inspirational Albums	10
