= Heart in Motion =

Studio album by Amy Grant
- Released: March 5, 1991
- Recorded: 1990
- Studios: The Bennett House and The Castle (Franklin, Tennessee); Quad Studios, RBI Recorders, Sixteenth Avenue Sound and Sound Stage Studios (Nashville, Tennessee); Bill Schnee Studio, Soundhouse and The Lighthouse (North Hollywood, California); Ocean Way Recording (Hollywood, California); Can-Am Recorders (Tarzana, California)
- Genres: Dance-pop; Contemporary Christian music
- Length: 44:19
- Label: A&M Myrrh
- Producers: Brown Bannister; Michael Omartian; Keith Thomas

Amy Grant chronology
Lead Me On (1988)	Heart in Motion (1991)	Home for Christmas (1992)

Singles from Heart in Motion
- 1. "Baby Baby" Released: January 18, 1991; 2. "Hope Set High" Released: April 11, 1991; 3. "Every Heartbeat" Released: June 13, 1991; 4. "That's What Love Is For" Released: September 12, 1991; 5. "Ask Me" Released: 1991; 6. "Good for Me" Released: January 13, 1992; 7. "I Will Remember You" Released: March 31, 1992

Professional ratings
Review scores
Source	Rating
AllMusic	4.5/5 stars
Chicago Tribune	3/4 stars
Christgau's Consumer Guide	C
Entertainment Weekly	B+
Los Angeles Times	2.5/5 stars
Music & Media	(favorable)
The Vancouver Sun	3/5 stars

Heart in Motion is the ninth studio album by Christian singer-songwriter, Amy Grant, released on March 5, 1991. Unlike Grant's previous albums, Heart In Motion contains pop songs mingled with Christian values (with the exception of "Hope Set High" and "Ask Me"). The album features Grant's biggest worldwide hit, "Baby Baby" and was certified 5× platinum in the United States, selling over five million copies.

== Commercial success ==
Heart in Motion peaked at No. 10 on the Billboard 200 and No. 1 of the Christian albums chart for 32 weeks. It sold five million copies by the end of 1997. The first single from the album, "Baby Baby" offers the lyric that provides the album title and reached No. 1 on the Billboard Hot 100 and the Hot Adult Contemporary Tracks charts. The following four singles also performed well on the pop and AC charts: "Every Heartbeat" (No. 2 Hot 100, No. 2 AC), "That's What Love Is For" (No. 7 Hot 100, No. 1 AC), "Good for Me" (No. 8 Hot 100, No. 4 AC), and "I Will Remember You" (No. 20 Hot 100, No. 2 AC). The album was listed at No. 30 in the 2001 book, The 100 Greatest Albums in Christian Music and was certified 5× platinum by the RIAA for sales of over five million copies.

The album also received a nomination at the Grammy Awards of 1992 for Album of the Year, which was awarded to Unforgettable... with Love by Natalie Cole. The lead single received three nominations, including Song of the Year and Record of the Year.

A 30th-anniversary remaster of the album, including a second disc of demos, outtakes, and remixes, was released by Amy Grant Productions, with distribution by Capitol Christian Music Group, on July 9, 2021.

== Track listing ==
No.	Title	Writer(s)	Producer(s)	Length
1.	"Good for Me"	Amy Grant, Wayne Kirkpatrick, Tom Snow, Jay Gruska	Keith Thomas	3:59
2.	"Baby Baby"	Grant, Thomas	Thomas	3:57
3.	"Every Heartbeat"	Grant, Kirkpatrick, Charlie Peacock	Brown Bannister	3:32
4.	"That's What Love Is For"	Grant, Michael Omartian, Mark Mueller	Omartian	4:17
5.	"Ask Me"	Grant, Tom Hemby	Omartian	3:51
6.	"Galileo"	Grant, Omartian, Gardner Cole, Mimi Verner	Omartian	4:19
7.	"You're Not Alone"	Simon Climie, Rob Fisher, Dennis Morgan	Bannister	3:49
8.	"Hats"	Grant, Chris Eaton	Bannister	4:09
9.	"I Will Remember You"	Grant, Gary Chapman, Thomas	Omartian	5:00
10.	"How Can We See That Far"	Grant, Hemby	Bannister	4:26
11.	"Hope Set High"	Grant	Omartian	2:48
Total length:				44:12

30th Anniversary Edition, disc two: bonus tracks
No.	Title	Writer(s)	Length
1.	"Don't Ever Want to Lose It (Wind in the Fire)"	Reed Arvin, Grant, Kirkpatrick	3:24
2.	"Stand by Me"	Grant, Eaton	3:31
3.	"Heart in Motion Medley"		6:06
4.	"Good for Me" (demo)		4:02
5.	"Baby Baby" (7" Heart in Motion Mix)		3:51
6.	"Every Heartbeat" (Steve Bishir Edit)		3:35
7.	"That's What Love Is For" (demo)		3:53
8.	"Ask Me" (7" mix)		4:02
9.	"Baby Baby" (12" Heart in Motion mix)		6:03
10.	"Galileo" (rough mix)		4:13
11.	"I Will Remember You" (rhythm mix)		5:01
12.	"Good for Me" (12" so good mix)		6:01
13.	"Every Heartbeat" (heart and soul edit)		3:48
14.	"Day and Night"	Grant, Omartian	3:50
15.	"Baby Baby" (7" no getting over you mix)		4:01
16.	"Good for Me" (12" mix)		5:44
Total length:			71:05

30th Anniversary Edition, Walmart exclusive bonus tracks
No.	Title	Length
17.	"Baby Baby" (live)	2:29
18.	"Every Heartbeat" (live)	2:30

== Personnel ==
Musicians

- Amy Grant – vocals
- Keith Thomas – arrangements (1, 2), synthesizers (1, 2), bass (1, 2), drum programming (1, 2), percussion programming (1)
- Brian Tankersley – additional synthesizer programming (1, 2)
- Robbie Buchanan – additional keyboards (3), keyboards (7, 10), bass (7), drum programming (10)
- Blair Masters – additional keyboards (3), keyboards (7)
- Charlie Peacock – keyboards (3, 7, 8, 10), programming (3), horn arrangements (3, 8), drum programming (10)
- Michael Omartian – keyboards (4–7, 9, 11), drum sequencing (5, 6, 9, 11)
- Jerry McPherson – guitars (1–3)
- Don Kirkpatrick – guitars (4–6, 9)
- Dann Huff – guitars (7)
- Gordon Kennedy – guitars (7)
- Chris Rodriguez – guitars (8)
- Tom Hemby – guitars (10)
- Tommy Sims – bass (3, 7, 8)
- Mark Hammond – drum and percussion programming (1)
- Chris McHugh – drums (3, 7, 8)
- David Raven – drums (4)
- Mark Douthit – saxophone (3, 8)
- Sam Levine – baritone saxophone (8)
- Barry Green – trombone (3, 8)
- Mike Haynes – trumpet (3, 8)
- Chris McDonald – horn arrangements (3, 8)

Background vocalists

- Ron Hemby – backing vocals (1, 2)
- Donna McElroy – backing vocals (1, 2)
- Keith Thomas – backing vocals (1)
- Vicki Hampton – backing vocals (2, 3)
- Chris Eaton – backing vocals (3, 7, 8)
- Kim Fleming – backing vocals (3)
- Amy Grant – backing vocals (3, 6–8, 10)
- Gary Chapman – backing vocals (4)
- Diana DeWitt – backing vocals (4)
- Michael Omartian – backing vocals (5, 6, 11)
- Susanne Schwartz – backing vocals (6, 11)
- Chris Rodriguez – backing vocals (7, 8)
- Kurt Howell – backing vocals (11)

Production

- Michael Blanton – executive producer
- Amy Grant – executive producer
- Todd Moore – production assistant (1, 2)
- Traci Sterling – production coordinator (3, 7, 8, 10)
- Richard Headen – production coordinator (3, 7, 8, 10)
- Janet Hinde – production coordinator (4–6, 9, 11)
- Chuck Beeson – art direction
- Rowan Moore – design
- Victoria Pearson-Cameron – photography

Technical

- Stephen Marcussen – mastering at Precision Mastering (Hollywood, California)
- Bill Whittington – recording (1, 2)
- Brian Malouf – mixing (1, 2, 7)
- Jeff Balding – recording (3, 7, 8, 10), mixing (3, 8, 10)
- Steve Bishir – overdub engineer (3, 7, 8, 10)
- Bill Deaton – overdub engineer (3, 7, 8, 10)
- Terry Christian – engineer (4–6, 9, 11), mixing (4–6, 9, 11), overdub engineer (7)
- Rick Will – overdub engineer (7)
- Clark Germain – overdub engineer (10)
- David Ahlert – additional engineer (4–6, 9, 11)
- Laura Livingston – additional engineer (4–6, 9, 11)
- Todd Culross – assistant engineer (1, 2)
- Todd Moore – assistant engineer (1, 2)
- Kelly Pribble – assistant engineer (1, 2)
- Pat MacDougal – mix assistant (1, 2, 7)
- Bob Loftus – assistant engineer (3, 7, 8, 10)
- Clif Norrell – mix assistant (3, 8, 10)

== Chart positions ==
=== Weekly charts ===
Weekly chart performance for Heart in Motion
Chart (1991)	Peak position
Australia (ARIA Charts)	14
Canada - RPM Top Albums/CDs	15
New Zealand	32
Norway	10
Sweden	7
Switzerland	17
UK Albums (OCC)	25
US Billboard 200	10
US Top Christian Albums (Billboard)	1

=== Year-end charts ===
1991 year-end chart performance for Heart in Motion
Chart (1991)	Peak position
US Billboard 200	15
US Christian Albums (Billboard)	3

1992 year-end chart performance for Heart in Motion
Chart (1992)	Peak position
US Billboard 200	24
US Christian Albums (Billboard)	2

1993 year-end chart performance for Heart in Motion
Chart (1993)	Peak position
US Christian Albums (Billboard)	39

=== Decade-end charts ===
Decade-end chart performance for Heart in Motion
Chart (1990–1999)	Peak position
US Christian Albums (Billboard)	5

== Certifications and sales ==
Region	Certification	Certified units/sales
Australia (ARIA)	Platinum	70,000^{^}
Canada (Music Canada)	Platinum	100,000^{^}
Taiwan (RIT)	2× Platinum	100,000
United Kingdom (BPI)	Gold	100,000^{^}
United States (RIAA)	5× Platinum	5,000,000^{^}
^{^} Shipments figures based on certification alone.
