= Simple Things (Amy Grant album) =

Studio album by Amy Grant
- Released: August 19, 2003
- Recorded: 2002–2003
- Studios: The Bennett House, Franklin; Sound Kitchen, Franklin; The Beanstalk, Franklin; The Parlor, Nashville; Ocean Way, Nashville
- Genres: Contemporary Christian; pop
- Length: 39:52
- Label: A&M
- Producers: Keith Thomas; Wayne Kirkpatrick; Brown Bannister; Ron Hemby

Amy Grant chronology
Legacy... Hymns and Faith (2002)	Simple Things (2003)	Greatest Hits 1986–2004 (2004)

Professional ratings
Review scores
Source	Rating
AllMusic	4.5/5 stars

Simple Things is the fifteenth studio album by American CCM singer-songwriter Amy Grant, released on August 19, 2003, by A&M Records,

Simple Things did not have the effect of Grant's previous pop efforts from the 1990s. The album topped Billboard's Christian album chart and the title track became a Top Ten Christian single, Simple Things peaked just outside the Top 20 on the Billboard 200, at No. 23. The title track peaked at the same position on the AC chart.

This album was reissued in 2007 with her Sparrow/EMI label but unlike her other albums it was not Digitally Remastered as it was already produced with the newer sound.

== Track listing ==
No.	Title	Writer(s)	Length
1.	"Happy"	Amy Grant; Holly Lamar; Jerry McPherson; Keith Thomas	4:10
2.	"Eye to Eye"	Grant; Thomas	3:58
3.	"Simple Things"	Grant; Thomas; Dillon O'Brian; William Owsley	3:58
4.	"Beautiful"	Austin Cunningham; Trina Harmon	4:11
5.	"Out in the Open"	Grant; Chris Eaton	4:37
6.	"I Don't Know Why"	Grant; Wayne Kirkpatrick	3:31
7.	"Looking for You"	Grant Thomas	4:12
8.	"Touch"	Grant; McPherson; O'Brian; Owsley; Thomas	3:28
9.	"Innocence Lost"	Ron Hemby	4:20
10.	"After the Fire"	Grant	3:21

== Personnel ==
Vocals

- Becky Corcoran – backing vocals (3)
- Vince Gill – guest vocals (4), backing vocals (7)
- Amy Grant – lead vocals, backing vocals (5, 7), acoustic guitar (10)
- Kim Keyes – backing vocals (6)
- Wayne Kirkpatrick – backing vocals (6)
- Tiffany Arbuckle Lee – backing vocals (2, 3)
- Rebecca Owsley – backing vocals (1)
- Will Owsley – backing vocals (1)
- Katy Hudson – backing vocals (2)
- Felicia Sorensen – backing vocals (7, 8)

Musicians

- David Browning – percussion (2)
- Pat Buchanan – acoustic guitar (4)
- Tom Bukovac – acoustic guitar (4), electric guitar (4)
- Chad Cromwell – drums (1, 7)
- Eric Darken – percussion (1, 2, 5, 7–9)
- Bruce Gaitsch – acoustic guitar (1, 3)
- Vince Gill – acoustic guitar solo (4), mandolin (8)
- Amy Grant – acoustic guitar (10)
- Kenny Greenberg – electric guitar (1–3, 7–9)
- Mark Hammond – drums (8)
- Ron Hemby – acoustic guitar (9), nylon guitar (9), bass (9), drums (9)
- Gordon Kennedy – guitars (5), electric guitar (6)
- Wayne Kirkpatrick – acoustic guitar (6)
- Chris McHugh – drum programming (2), drums (4–6)
- Jerry McPherson – electric guitar (1, 3, 7–9)
- Craig Nelson – bass (4)
- Will Owsley – electric guitar (1–3), acoustic guitar (2), lead guitar solo (3)
- Tim Pierce – guitars (5)
- Jeffrey Roach – keyboards (6)
- Tommy Sims – bass (1, 2, 8)
- Leland Sklar – bass (5)
- Jimmie Lee Sloas – bass (6)
- Bobby Terry – acoustic guitar (2)
- Keith Thomas – keyboards (1–4, 7–9), programming (1, 2, 4, 8, 9), drum programming (2, 3, 7), bass programming (3, 7), acoustic guitar (7, 8)

Production

- James "JB" Baird – engineer (6)
- Brown Bannister – producer (5)
- Steve Bishir – engineer (5)
- Susan Browne – package design
- Darryl Bush – production coordinator (1–4, 7–10)
- Charles Dujic – stylist
- Kevin Edlin – assistant engineer (1–4, 7–10)
- Greg Fogie – assistant engineer (1–4, 7–10)
- Ron Hemby – co-producer (9)
- Scott Hull – mastering at The Hit Factory (New York City, New York)
- Sam Jones – photography
- Wayne Kirkpatrick – producer (6)
- D'Ann McAllister – production assistance (6)
- Hank Nirider – assistant engineer (5)
- Kendra Richards – make-up
- Jennifer Sigler – production coordinator (1–4, 7–10)
- Shaun Shankel – production coordinator (1–4, 7–10)
- David Streit – assistant engineer (1–4, 7–10)
- Traci Sterling Bishir – production manager (5)
- Keith Thomas – executive producer, producer (1–4, 7–10), mixing
- Bill Whittington – engineer (1–4, 7–10), mixing
- Jeanne Yang – stylist
- Chris Yoakum – ProTools editing, MIDI technician

== Charts ==
=== Weekly charts ===
Year	Chart	Peak position
2003	US Top Christian Albums (Billboard)	1
2003	US Top Album Sales (Billboard)	23
2003	US Billboard 200	23

=== Singles ===
Title	Date	Chart	Peak position
"Simple Things"	August 15, 2003	US Adult Contemporary (Billboard)	23
"Simple Things"	August 29, 2003	US Christian Airplay (Billboard)	7
"Simple Things"	August 29, 2003	US Hot Christian Songs (Billboard)	7
"Out In the Open"	February 20, 2004	US Hot Christian Songs (Billboard)	24
"Out In the Open"	February 20, 2004	US Christian Airplay (Billboard)	24
