= Every Heartbeat =

1991 single by Amy Grant

Single by Amy Grant

from the album Heart in Motion
- Released: June 1991
- Genre: Pop rock
- Length: 3:30
- Label: A&M
- Songwriters: Amy Grant; Wayne Kirkpatrick; Charlie Peacock
- Producers: Brown Bannister; Daniel Abraham (single version)

Amy Grant singles chronology
"Hope Set High" (1991)	"Every Heartbeat" (1991)	"That's What Love Is For" (1991)

Music video
- "Every Heartbeat" on YouTube

Amy Grant "Every Heartbeat" (1991)
30-second sample from Amy Grant's "Every Heartbeat".

"Every Heartbeat" is a song by American Christian singer Amy Grant. It was released in June 1991 by A&M Records (in remixed and re-produced form) as the third single from her ninth studio album, Heart in Motion (1991), though it was the second from the album to be released to mainstream pop radio. It reached No. 2 on the US Billboard Hot 100 and on the Adult Contemporary chart for one and six weeks, respectively. Charlie Peacock wrote the song's music and chorus lyrics, with Grant and Wayne Kirkpatrick composing the remaining lyrics.

In 2004, Sixpence None the Richer covered "Every Heartbeat" on the album Full Circle: A Celebration of Songs and Friends, which commemorated Charlie Peacock's 20-year anniversary as a solo recording artist. Mark Lowry parodied the song with the title "Every Teacher". In 2014, the song was included on Grant's remix compilation album, In Motion: The Remixes. A digital remix EP was released on iTunes in support of the album which charted at No. 13 on the Billboard Hot Dance Club Songs chart.

== Music video ==
A music video was produced to promote the single. The video was directed by D.J. Webster and edited by Scott C. Wilson. Actress Musetta Vander is featured in it.

== Track listings ==
- US 7-inch and cassette single
1. "Every Heartbeat" (7-inch Heart and Soul mix) – 3:49
2. "Every Heartbeat" (7-inch Body and Soul mix) – 3:50
- Canadian cassette single
1. "Every Heartbeat" (7-inch Heart and Soul mix) – 3:49
2. "Every Heartbeat" (7-inch Body and Soul mix) – 3:50
- 2014 US digital remix single
1. "Every Heartbeat" (Moto Blanco radio edit) – 3:24
2. "Every Heartbeat" (Moto Blanco club mix) – 5:30
3. "Every Heartbeat" (Moto Blanco instrumental) – 5:30

== Personnel ==
- Amy Grant – lead vocals, backing vocals
- Charlie Peacock – keyboards, programming, horn arrangements
- Robbie Buchanan – additional keyboards
- Blair Masters – additional keyboards
- Jerry McPherson – guitars
- Tommy Sims – bass
- Chris McHugh – drums
- Mark Douthit – saxophone
- Barry Green – trombone
- Mike Haynes – trumpet
- Chris McDonald – horn arrangements
- Chris Eaton – backing vocals
- Kim Fleming – backing vocals
- Vicki Hampton – backing vocals
- Daniel Abraham – additional production and remix (Heart and Soul 7-inch and 12-inch mixes, Body and Soul 7-inch and 12-inch mixes, Piano 7-inch and 12-inch mixes)

== Charts ==
=== Weekly charts ===
1991 weekly chart performance for "Every Heartbeat"
Chart (1991)	Peak position
Australia (ARIA)	17
Belgium (Ultratop 50 Flanders)	40
Canada Top Singles (RPM)	7
Canada Adult Contemporary (RPM)	2
Europe (Eurochart Hot 100)	50
Europe (European Hit Radio)	7
Germany (GfK)	37
Ireland (IRMA)	22
Luxembourg (Radio Luxembourg)	12
New Zealand (Recorded Music NZ)	27
Sweden (Sverigetopplistan)	25
UK Singles (Official Charts)	25
UK Airplay (Music Week)	1
US Billboard Hot 100	2
US Adult Contemporary (Billboard)	2
US Cash Box Top 100	2

2014 weekly chart performance for "Every Heartbeat"
Chart (2014)	Peak position
US Dance Club Songs (Billboard)	13
US Hot Dance/Electronic Songs (Billboard)	44

=== Year-end charts ===
Year-end chart performance for "Every Heartbeat"
Chart (1991)	Position
Australia (ARIA)	91
Canada Top Singles (RPM)	56
Canada Adult Contemporary (RPM)	13
Europe (European Hit Radio)	43
US Billboard Hot 100	28
US Adult Contemporary (Billboard)	11
US Cash Box Top 100	13

== Release history ==
Release dates and formats for "Every Heartbeat"
Region	Date	Format(s)	Label(s)	Ref.
United States	June 1991	7-inch vinyl; 12-inch vinyl; cassette	A&M	
United Kingdom	July 22, 1991	7-inch vinyl; 12-inch vinyl; CD; cassette	A&M	
Japan	July 1, 1992	CD (with "Baby Baby")	A&M	
