= That's What Love Is For =

1991 single by Amy Grant

Single by Amy Grant

from the album Heart in Motion
- B-side: "Baby Baby" (No Getting Over You mix)
- Released: September 12, 1991
- Genre: CCM
- Length: 4:17
- Label: A&M
- Songwriters: Amy Grant; Mark Mueller; Michael Omartian
- Producer: Michael Omartian

Amy Grant singles chronology
"Every Heartbeat" (1991)	"That's What Love Is For" (1991)	"Ask Me" (1991)

Music video
- "That's What Love Is For" on YouTube

"That's What Love Is For" is a song by American singer-songwriter Amy Grant. It was written by Michael Omartian, Mark Mueller, and Amy Grant and produced by Omartian. It was released as the fourth single from Grant's ninth studio album, Heart in Motion (1991). There are two versions of the song: the album cut and the pop radio edit. For pop radio airplay, the strings were removed and the song was remixed with a new rhythm track.

Upon its release, the single topped the Billboard Adult Contemporary chart for three weeks and peaked at No. 7 on the Billboard Hot 100, finishing at No. 91 on the 1992 Billboard year-end ranking. In Canada, the song reached No. 1 on the RPM 40AC (Adult Contemporary) chart, as well as No. 7 on the RPM 100 Hit Tracks chart.

== Music video ==
A music video was produced to promote the single, and mixes shots of Grant wearing a red cloak and singing to the camera, while other shots of her singing are in black and white. The music video was filmed at the Craters of the Moon National Monument and Preserve in Idaho. It also features a male/female couple, sitting together on a bench but not looking at each other. At the 3:12 mark of the video (just after Grant sings the bridge leading into the last chorus), the couple are seen in black and white, holding each other loosely while the music plays and Grant sings. The video fades out on a shot of Grant singing ad-libs in front of a sepia-toned background. Off in the distance is the man, and further off, presumably the woman. Behind them all are four large letters which spell the word "LOVE".

There are two versions of this video. One version has additional shots of Amy. One where she is in a giant, tall green dress. Another shot shows a black & white close up of Amy in a very retro-mod hair style.

== Track listings ==
- Remixes (featuring Chris Cox) – EP
1. "That's What Love Is For" (featuring Chris Cox) [radio edit] – 3:13
2. "That's What Love Is For" (featuring Chris Cox) [Mixshow edit] – 5:33
3. "That's What Love Is For" (featuring Chris Cox) [club mix] – 7:26
4. "That's What Love Is For" (featuring Chris Cox) [dub] – 5:41
- UK retail single
1. "That's What Love Is For" (album edit)
2. "Baby Baby" (No Getting Over You mix)
3. "That's What Love Is For" (extended single mix)
4. "That's What Love Is For" (album version)

== Personnel ==
- Amy Grant – lead vocals
- Michael Omartian – keyboards
- Don Kirkpatrick – guitars
- David Raven – drums
- Diana DeWitt – backing vocals
- Gary Chapman – backing vocals

== Charts ==
=== Weekly charts ===
Chart (1991)	Peak position
Australia (ARIA)	68
Canada Top Singles (RPM)	7
Canada Adult Contemporary (RPM)	1
Europe (European Hit Radio)	32
Germany (GfK)	78
Luxembourg (Radio Luxembourg)	10
UK Singles (Official Charts)	60
UK Airplay (Music Week)	26
US Billboard Hot 100	7
US Adult Contemporary (Billboard)	1
US Cash Box Top 100	2

=== Year-end charts ===
Chart (1991)	Position
Canada Top Singles (RPM)	61
Canada Adult Contemporary (RPM)	35
US Cash Box Top 100	45

Chart (1992)	Position
US Billboard Hot 100	91
US Adult Contemporary (Billboard)	26
US Cash Box Top 100	34

== Release history ==
Region	Date	Format(s)	Label(s)	Ref.
United States	September 12, 1991	7-inch vinyl; cassette	A&M	
United Kingdom	October 14, 1991	7-inch vinyl; CD; cassette	A&M	
Australia	November 18, 1991	CD; cassette	A&M	
