= I Will Remember You (Amy Grant song) =

Single by Amy Grant

from the album Heart in Motion
- Released: March 31, 1992
- Studio: Sound House (North Hollywood, CA)
- Genre: CCM; pop
- Length: 5:00 (album version); 5:06 (Rhythm Remix)
- Label: A&M
- Songwriters: Amy Grant; Gary Chapman; Keith Thomas
- Producers: Michael Omartian; Daniel Abraham; Mark Mazetti

Amy Grant singles chronology
"Good for Me" (1992)	"I Will Remember You" (1992)	"Somewhere Somehow" (1992)

Music video
- "I Will Remember You" on YouTube

"I Will Remember You" is a song from Amy Grant's twelfth album, Heart in Motion (1991). The single was a remixed version of the original album track. A&M Records put the remix in lead position on a three-track promotional CD single it released in March 1992, which it followed with a promotional music video.

"I Will Remember You" became Heart in Motion's first release to fail to achieve top 10 status on the Billboard Hot 100, peaking at number 20.

== Personnel ==
- Amy Grant – vocals
- Michael Omartian – keyboards, drum sequencing
- Dann Huff – guitars

== Charts ==
=== Weekly charts ===
Weekly chart performance for "I Will Remember You"
Chart (1992)	Peak position
US Billboard Hot 100	20
US Adult Contemporary (Billboard)	2
US Radio Songs (Billboard)	25
US Cash Box Top 100	14

=== Year-end charts ===
1992 year-end chart performance for "I Will Remember You"
Chart (1992)	Position
US Billboard Hot 100	96
US Adult Contemporary (Billboard)	12
