= Amy Grant =

American singer-songwriter, musician (born 1960)

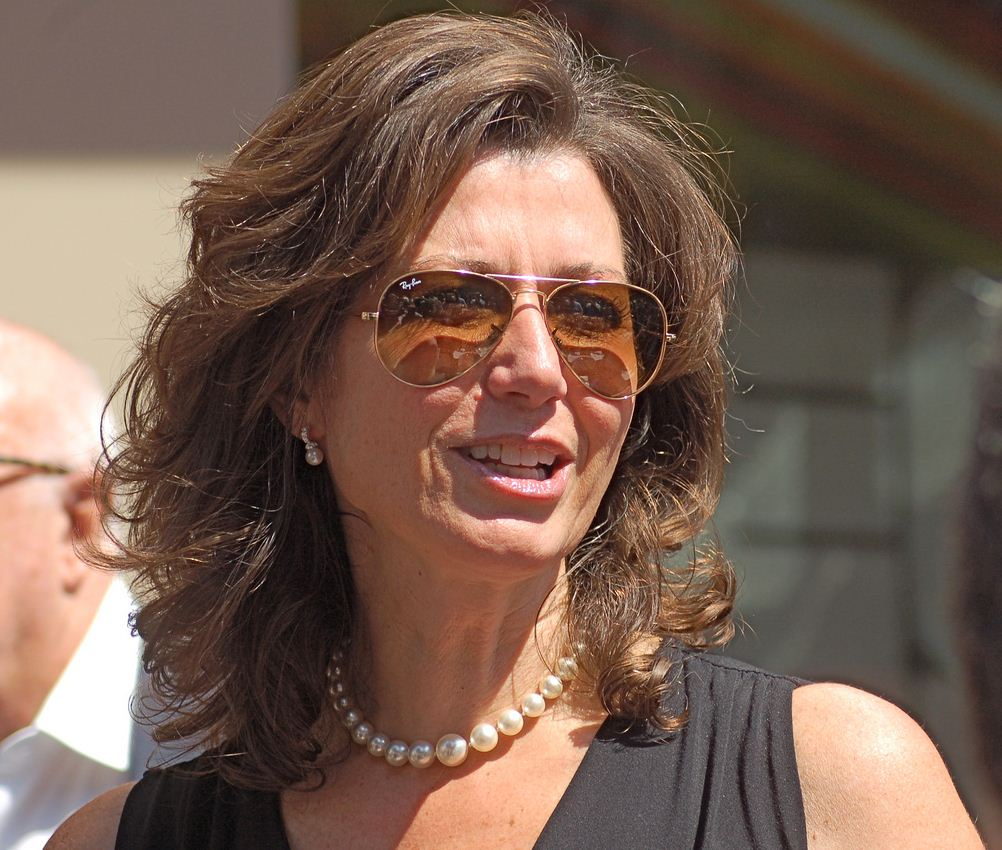
- Grant in 2012
- Born: Amy Lee Grant; November 25, 1960 (age 65); Augusta, Georgia, U.S.
- Education: Furman University; Vanderbilt University
- Occupations: Singer-songwriter; musician
- Spouses: Gary Chapman (m. 1982; div. 1999); Vince Gill (m. 2000)
- Children: 4
- Awards: Full list
- Musical career
- Origin: Nashville, Tennessee, U.S.
- Genres: Contemporary Christian; pop rock; soft rock; gospel
- Instruments: Vocals; guitar
- Years active: 1976–present
- Labels: Myrrh; A&M; Word; Sparrow
- Website: amygrant.com

Amy Lee Grant (born November 25, 1960) is an American singer-songwriter and musician. She began her music career in contemporary Christian music (CCM) before crossing over to pop music in the mid-1980s. Grant has been referred to as "The Queen of Christian Pop". Grant was formerly married to fellow Christian musician Gary Chapman; after their divorce in 1999, she married country music singer Vince Gill in 2000.

Grant made her debut as a teenager, gaining fame in Christian music during the 1980s with hits such as "Father's Eyes", "El Shaddai", and "Angels". In the mid-1980s, she began broadening her audience and soon became one of the first CCM artists to cross over into mainstream pop on the heels of her successful albums Unguarded and Lead Me On. In 1986, she scored her first Billboard Hot 100 no. 1 song in a duet with Peter Cetera, "The Next Time I Fall". In 1991, she released the album Heart in Motion, which became her best-selling album, topping the Billboard Christian album chart for 32 weeks. It sold five million copies in the U.S. and produced her second no. 1 pop single "Baby Baby", as well as another three top 10 hits on the Billboard Hot 100: "That's What Love Is For", "Every Heartbeat" and "Good for Me".

As of 2009, Grant had sold more than 30 million albums worldwide, won six Grammy Awards, 22 Gospel Music Association Dove Awards, and had the first Christian album to go platinum. She was honored with a star on the Hollywood Walk of Fame in 2006 for her contributions to the entertainment industry, and in 2022 she was announced as a recipient of the Kennedy Center Honors. Grant is the author of several books, including a memoir, Mosaic: Pieces of My Life So Far, and a book based on the popular Christmas song "Breath of Heaven (Mary's Song)" that she co-wrote.

== Background ==
=== Early life and career ===
Born in Augusta, Georgia, Grant is the youngest of four sisters. Her family settled in Nashville in 1967. She is a great-granddaughter of Nashville philanthropist A. M. Burton (founder of Life and Casualty Insurance Company, eponym of Nashville's Life & Casualty Tower, WLAC Radio, and WLAC-TV) and Lillie Burton. She has acknowledged the influence of the Burtons on her development as a musician, starting with their common membership in Nashville's Ashwood Church of Christ. According to the Singing Carrots website, based on her recorded songs, Grant has a mezzo-soprano voice type, also able to perform in the soprano and contralto ranges.

In 1976, Grant wrote her first song ("Mountain Top"), performed in public for the first time at Harpeth Hall School, the all-girls school she attended in Nashville. She recorded a demo tape for her parents with church youth-leader Brown Bannister. While Bannister was dubbing a copy of the tape, Chris Christian, the owner of the recording studio, heard the demo and called Word Records. He played it over the phone, and she was offered a recording contract five weeks before her 16th birthday.

In 1977, she recorded her first album, Amy Grant, produced by Bannister, who also produced her next 11 albums. It was released in early 1978, one month before her high-school graduation. Toward the end of 1978 she performed her first ticketed concert after beginning her first year at Furman University.

In May 1979, while at the album-release party for her second album, My Father's Eyes, Grant met Gary Chapman, who had written the title track. Grant and Chapman toured together in mid-1979. In late 1980, she transferred to Vanderbilt University where she was a member of the sorority Kappa Alpha Theta. Grant made a few more albums before dropping out of college to pursue a career in music—Never Alone, followed by a pair of live albums in 1981 (In Concert and In Concert Volume Two), both backed by an augmented edition of the DeGarmo & Key band. It was during these early shows that Grant also established one of her concert trademarks: performing barefoot. Grant continues to take off her shoes midway through performances, as she has said, "it is just more comfortable."

In 1982 she released her breakthrough album Age to Age. The album contains the signature track, "El Shaddai" (written by Michael Card) and the Grant-Chapman penned song, "In a Little While". "El Shaddai" was later awarded one of the "Songs of the Century" by the RIAA in 2001. Grant received her first Grammy Award for Best Contemporary Gospel Performance, as well as two GMA Dove Awards for Gospel Artist of the Year and Pop/Contemporary Album of the Year. Age to Age became the first Christian album by a solo artist to be certified gold (1983) and the first Christian album to be certified platinum (1985).

In the mid-1980s, Grant began touring and recording with young up-and-coming songwriter Michael W. Smith. Grant and Smith continue to have a strong friendship and creative relationship, often writing songs for or contributing vocals to each other's albums, and as of 2019, often touring together annually during November and December putting on Christmas concerts. During the 1980s, Grant was also a backup singer for Bill Gaither.

Grant followed this album with the first of her Christmas albums, which was later the basis for her holiday shows. In 1984, she released another pop-oriented Christian hit, Straight Ahead, earning Grant her first appearance at the Grammy Awards show in 1985. The head of NBC took notice of Grant's performance and called her manager to book her for her own Christmas special.

=== Widening audience ===
Shortly after Grant established herself as the "Queen of Christian Pop" she changed directions to widen her fan base. Her goal was to become the first Christian singer-songwriter who was also successful as a contemporary pop singer. Unguarded (1985) surprised some fans for its very mainstream sound. "Find a Way", from Unguarded, became one of the few non-Christmas Christian songs to hit the Billboard Top 40 list, also reaching No. 7 on the Adult Contemporary chart. She also scored No. 18 on Billboard AC in 1986 with "Stay for Awhile". Grant scored her first Billboard No. 1 song in 1986 with "The Next Time I Fall", a duet with former Chicago singer/bassist Peter Cetera. That year, she also recorded a duet with singer Randy Stonehill for his Love Beyond Reason album, titled "I Could Never Say Goodbye", and recorded The Animals' Christmas with Art Garfunkel.

Lead Me On (1988) contained many songs which were about Christianity and love relationships, but some interpreted it as not being enough of a "Christian" record. Years later Lead Me On would be chosen as the greatest Contemporary Christian album of all time by CCM Magazine. The mainstream song "Saved by Love" was a minor hit, receiving airplay on radio stations featuring the newly emerging Adult Contemporary format. The album's title song received some pop radio airplay and crossed over to No. 96 on the Billboard Hot 100, and "1974 (We Were Young)" and "Saved By Love" also charted as Adult Contemporary songs. In 1989, she appeared in a Target ad campaign, performing songs from the album.

=== In the mainstream ===
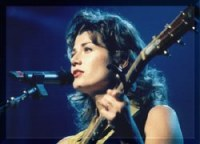
Grant during her Behind the Eyes tour in 1998

When Heart in Motion was released in 1991, many fans were surprised that the album was of contemporary pop music. Grant's desire to widen her audience was frowned upon by the confines of the popular definitions of ministry at the time. The track "Baby Baby" written for Grant's newborn daughter Millie, of whom Grant wrote, her "six-week-old face was my inspiration", became a pop hit (hitting No. 1 on the Billboard Hot 100), and Grant was established as a name in the mainstream music world. "Baby Baby" received Grammy nominations for Best Female Pop Vocal Performance, and Record and Song of the Year (although it failed to win in any of those categories).

Four other hits from the album made the Pop top 20: "Every Heartbeat" (No. 2), "That's What Love Is For" (No. 7), "Good for Me" (No. 8), and "I Will Remember You" (No. 20). On the Adult Contemporary chart, all five songs were top 10 hits, with two of the five ("Baby Baby" and "That's What Love Is For") reaching No. 1. Many Christian fans remained loyal, putting the album atop Billboard Contemporary Christian Chart for 32 weeks. Heart in Motion is Grant's best-selling album, having sold over five million copies according to the RIAA. Grant followed the album with her second Christmas album, Home For Christmas in 1992, which included the song "Breath of Heaven (Mary's Song)", written by Chris Eaton and Grant, and would later be covered by many artists, including Donna Summer, Jessica Simpson (who acknowledged Grant as one of her favorite artists), Vince Gill, Sara Groves, Point of Grace, Gladys Knight, and Broadway star Barbara Cook.

House of Love in 1994 continued in the same vein, containing pop songs mingled with spiritual lyrics. The album was a multi-platinum success and produced the pop hit "Lucky One" (No. 18 pop and No. 2 AC; No. 1 on Radio & Records) as well as the title track (a duet with country music star and future husband Vince Gill) (No. 37 pop) and a cover of Joni Mitchell's frequently covered "Big Yellow Taxi" (No. 67 pop) (in which she changed the line "And they charged the people a dollar and a half just to see'em" to "And then they charged the people 25 bucks just to see'em").

After she covered the 10cc song "The Things We Do for Love" for the Mr. Wrong soundtrack, Behind the Eyes was released in September 1997. The album struck a much darker note, leaning more towards downtempo, acoustic soft-rock songs, with more mature (yet still optimistic) lyrics. She called it her "razor blades and Prozac" album. Although "Takes a Little Time" was a moderate hit single, the album failed to sell like the previous two albums, which had both gone multi-platinum. Behind The Eyes was eventually certified Gold by the RIAA. The video for "Takes a Little Time" was a new direction for Grant; with a blue light filter, acoustic guitar, the streets and characters of New York City, and a plot, Grant was re-cast as an adult light rocker. She followed up "Behind The Eyes" with A Christmas To Remember, her third Christmas album, in 1999. The album was certified gold in 2000.

Following the 9/11 attacks Grant's "I Will Remember You" saw a resurgence in popularity as many radio DJs mixed a special tribute version of the song. In the same year Grant won $125,000 for charity on the "Rock Star Edition" of Who Wants to Be a Millionaire?

=== Return to gospel roots ===
Grant returned to Christian pop with the 2002 release of an album of hymns titled Legacy... Hymns and Faith. The album featured a Vince Gill-influenced mix of bluegrass and pop and marked Grant's 25th anniversary in the music industry. Grant followed this up with Simple Things in 2003. The album did not have the success of her previous pop or gospel efforts. Soon after Simple Things, Grant and Interscope/A&M parted ways. The same year, Grant was inducted into the Gospel Music Hall of Fame by the Gospel Music Association, an industry trade organization of which she is a longstanding member, in her first year of eligibility. Grant released a sequel in 2005 titled Rock of Ages...Hymns and Faith.

Grant joined the reality television phenomenon by hosting Three Wishes, a show in which she and a team of helpers make wishes come true for small-town residents. The show debuted on NBC in September 2005; however it was canceled at the end of its first season due to high production costs. In the same year, Grant won her 6th Grammy Award for Rock of Ages... Hymns & Faith. In a February 2006 webchat, Grant said she believes her "best music is still ahead".

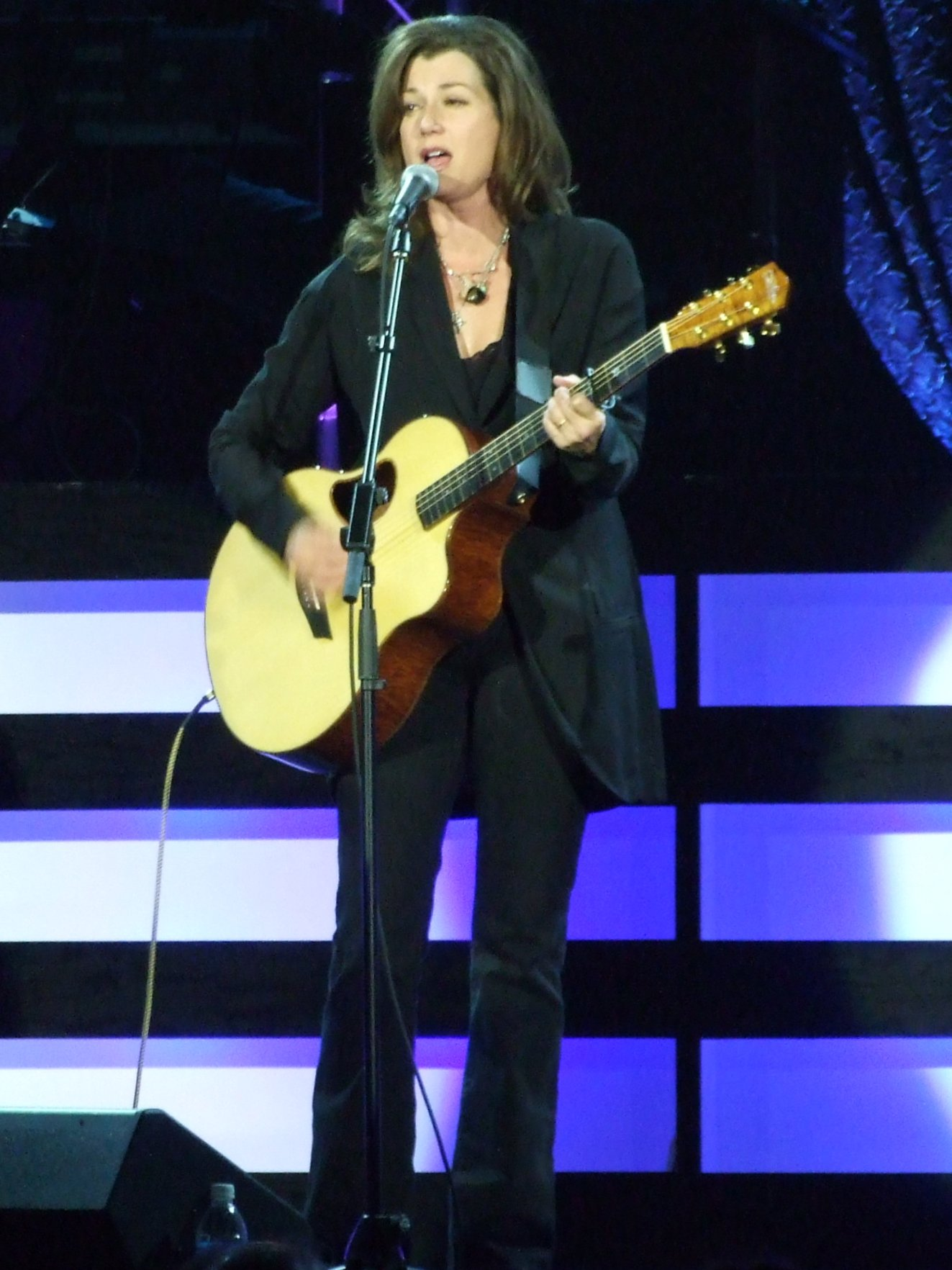
Grant performing in October 2008

In April 2006, a live CD/DVD titled Time Again... Amy Grant Live was recorded in Fort Worth, Texas, at Bass Performance Hall. (Grant's first paid public performance was at the Will Rogers Auditorium in Fort Worth.) The concert was released on September 26, 2006. In addition to receiving a star on the Hollywood Walk of Fame, media appearances included write-ups in CCM Magazine, and a performance on The View.

In a February 2007 web chat on her web site, Grant discussed a book she was working on titled Mosaic: Pieces of My Life So Far, saying, "It's not an autobiography, but more a collection of memories, song lyrics, poetry and a few pictures." The book was released on October 16, 2007. In November, it debuted at No. 35 on the New York Times Best Seller list. In the same web chat, Grant noted that she is "anxious to get back in the studio after the book is finished, and reinvent myself as an almost-50 performing woman".

2007 was Grant's 30th year in music. She left Word/Warner, and contracted with EMI CMG who re-released her regular studio albums as remastered versions on August 14, 2007. Marking the start of Grant's new contract is a career-spanning greatest hits album, with all the songs digitally remastered. The album was released as both a single-disc CD edition, and a two-disc CD/DVD Special Edition, the DVD featuring music videos and interviews. Grant appeared with Gill on The Oprah Winfrey Show for a holiday special in December 2007.

In February 2008, Grant joined the writing team from Compassionart as a guest vocalist at the Abbey Road studios, London, to record a song called "Highly Favoured", which was included on the album CompassionArt. On June 24, 2008, Grant re-released her 1988 album, Lead Me On, in honor of its 20th anniversary. The two-disc release includes the original album and a second disc with new acoustic recordings, live performances from 1989, and interviews with Amy. Grant recreated the Lead Me On tour in the fall of 2008. On June 27, 2008, at Creation Festival Northeast she performed "Lead Me On" and a few other songs backed by Hawk Nelson. At the end of the concert, Grant returned to the stage and sang "Thy Word". She appeared on the 2008 album Anne Murray Duets: Friends & Legends singing "Could I Have This Dance".

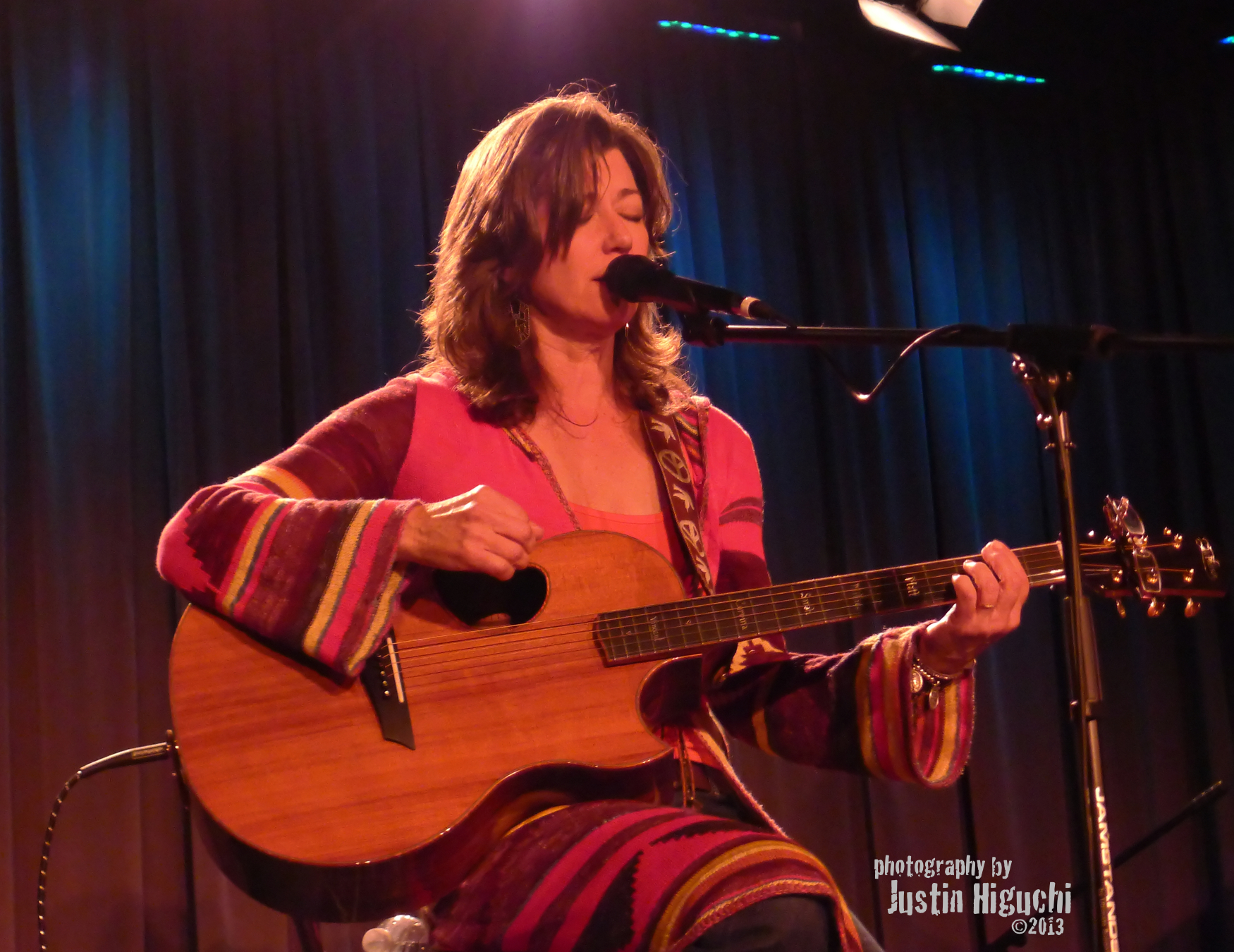
Grant speaking and performing at Grammy Museum at L.A. Live in September, 2013

On May 5, 2009, Grant released an EP containing two new songs, "She Colors My Day", and "Unafraid", as well as the previously released songs "Baby Baby" and "Oh How the Years Go By". The EP, exclusively through iTunes, benefited the Entertainment Industry Foundation's (EIF) Women's Cancer Research Fund. In 2010, Grant released Somewhere Down the Road, featuring the hit single "Better Than a Hallelujah", which peaked at No. 8 on Billboard Top Christian Songs chart. When asked about the new album during an interview with CBN.com, Grant says, "... my hope is just for those songs to provide companionship, remind myself and whoever else is listening what's important. I feel like songs have the ability to connect us to ourselves and to each other, and to our faith, to the love of Jesus, in a way that conversation doesn't do. Songs kind of slip in and move you before you realize it." In September 2012, Grant took part in a campaign called "30 Songs / 30 Days" to support Half the Sky: Turning Oppression into Opportunity for Women Worldwide, a multi-platform media project inspired by Nicholas Kristof and Sheryl WuDunn's book.

Grant's next album, How Mercy Looks from Here, was released on May 14, 2013, and was produced by Marshall Altman. The album reached No. 12 on the Billboard 200 chart, making it her highest-charting album since 1997's Behind the Eyes. Two singles were released from the album: "Don't Try So Hard" and "If I Could See", both of which charted on the US Billboard Hot Christian Songs chart. On August 19, 2014, she released an album of hits remixed by well known engineers and DJs. The album was titled In Motion: The Remixes. It charted at 110 on the US Billboard 200 chart and at No. 5 on the US Dance chart. To promote the album, several new remix EPs were released on iTunes the following month including "Find a Way, "Stay for Awhile", "Baby Baby, "Every Heartbeat" and "That's What Love Is For". Due to club play of the remixes of "Baby Baby" and "Every Heartbeat", they charted at No. 3 and 13, respectively on the U.S. Dance Chart. This marked her first appearance on that chart in 23 years. On September 30, 2014, Grant released a new single titled "Welcome Yourself". In honor of Breast Cancer Awareness Month, proceeds of the single go to breast cancer research.

On February 12, 2015, she announced a new compilation album titled Be Still and Know... Hymns & Faith, to be released. The album was released on April 14, 2015, and charted at No. 7 in the U.S. on the Billboard Christian Albums chart. . Grant released a Christmas album on October 21, 2016, Tennessee Christmas, which is a combination of classic Christmas songs and original material. It charted in the U.S. at No. 31 on the Billboard 200 and at No. 3 on the Billboard Top Holiday Albums chart. The single from the album, "To Be Together", reached No. 32 on the Hot Christian Songs chart and No. 19 on the Holiday Digital Song Sales chart. She supported the album with a series of Christmas concerts with Vince Gill at the Ryman Auditorium. She also toured the U.S. and Canada with Christmas concerts accompanied by Michael W. Smith and season 9 winner of The Voice, Jordan Smith. In February 2017, she released a new song, "Say It With a Kiss", with accompanying video. During November and December 2017, Grant performed another series of Christmas concerts with Vince Gill at the Ryman and embarked on another U.S. and Canada Christmas tour with Michael W. Smith and Jordan Smith. Grant has been a guest narrator for Disney's Candlelight Processional at Walt Disney World in 2012, 2013, and 2015.

== Personal life ==
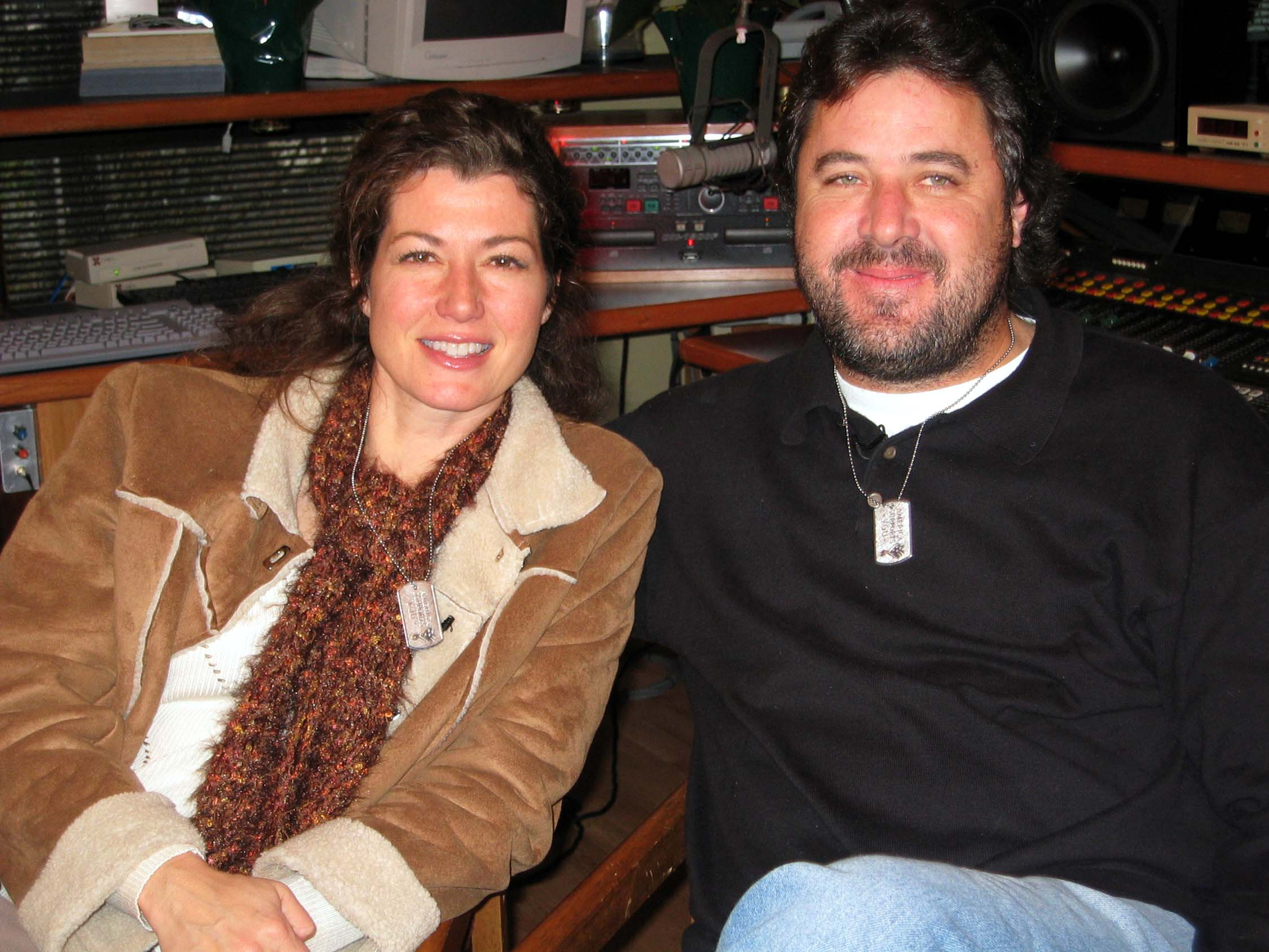
Grant with husband Vince Gill in 2004

On June 19, 1982, Grant married fellow Christian musician Gary Chapman. Their marriage produced three children. In March 1999 she filed for divorce from Chapman. On March 10, 2000, Grant married country singer-songwriter Vince Gill, who had been previously married to country singer Janis Oliver of Sweethearts of the Rodeo. Grant and Gill have one daughter together, Corrina Grant Gill, born March 12, 2001. In the November 1999 CCM Magazine, Grant explained why she left Chapman and married Gill:

I didn't get a divorce because 'I had a great marriage and then along came Vince Gill.' Gary and I had a rocky road from day one. I think what was so hard—and this is (what) one of our counselors said—sometimes an innocent party can come into a situation, and they're like a big spotlight. What they do is reveal, by comparison, the painful dynamics that are already in existence.

In June 2020, Grant had an open-heart surgery to repair partial anomalous pulmonary venous return (PAPVR), a congenital heart condition.

In July 2022, Grant was hospitalized in Nashville following a bicycle accident and, on doctors' advice, postponed several concert dates while she recovered.

== Public views and perception ==
Along with praise for her contributions to the contemporary Christian genre, Grant has also generated controversy within the Christian community, from "complaints that she was too worldly and too sexy" to a "barrage of condemnation" following her divorce and remarriage.

In an interview early in her career, Grant stated, "I have a healthy sense of right and wrong, but sometimes, for example, using foul, exclamation-point words among friends can be good for a laugh." The article based on that interview was constructed to make it appear as though Grant condoned premarital sex. Later Grant reflected on how the article misrepresented her views, stating: "We probably talked for two hours about sexual purity, but when the interview finally came out he worded it in such a way that it sounded like I condoned premarital sex. So I picked up that article and thought, 'You've made me say something I've never said, and you've totally disregarded two hours of Bible to put in one flippant comment that I made about a moan.'"

== Discography ==
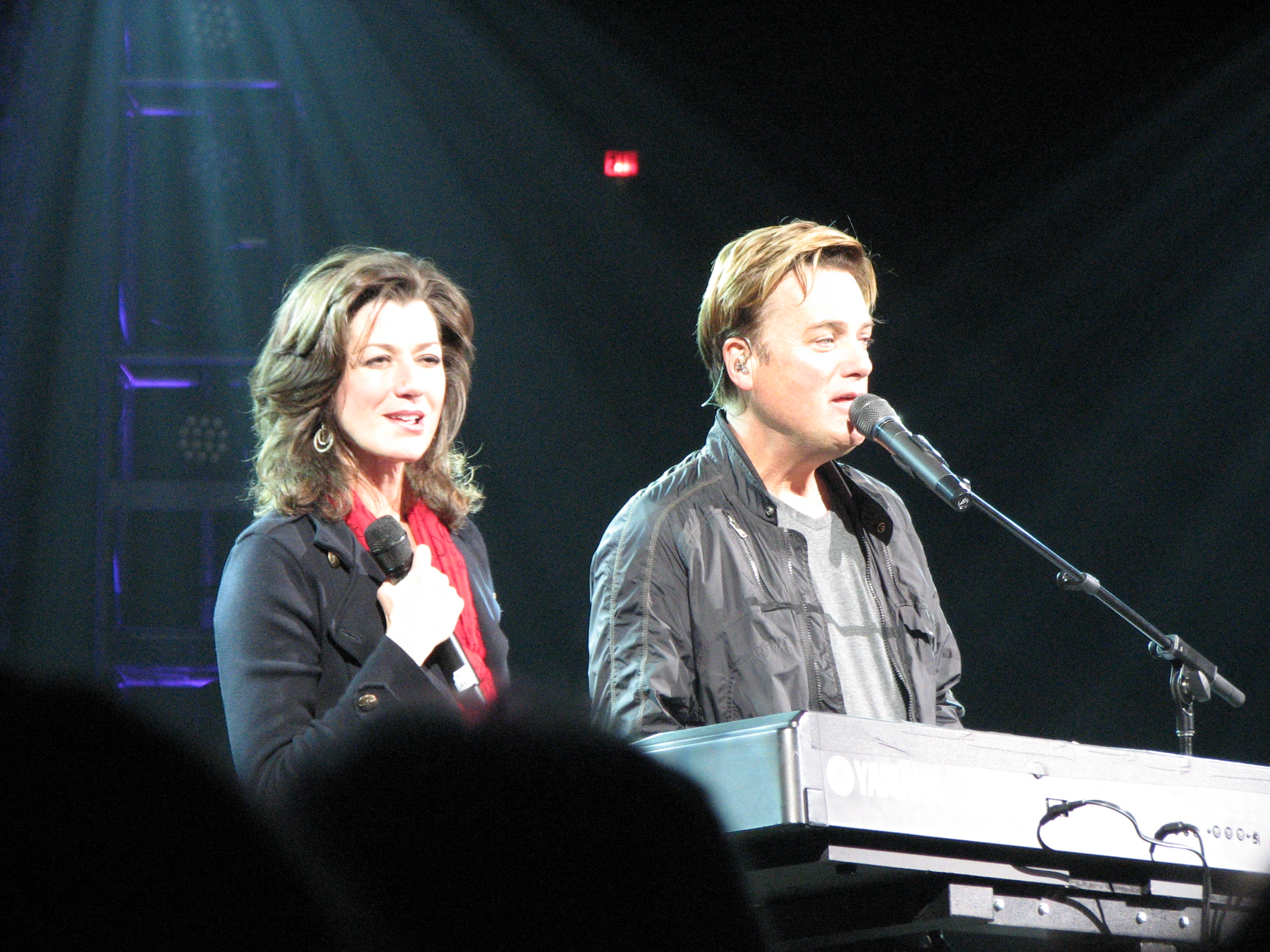
Grant with Michael W. Smith in 2011

Studio albums

- Amy Grant (1977)
- My Father's Eyes (1979)
- Never Alone (1980)
- Age to Age (1982)
- A Christmas Album (1983)
- Straight Ahead (1984)
- Unguarded (1985)
- Lead Me On (1988)
- Heart in Motion (1991)
- Home for Christmas (1992)
- House of Love (1994)
- Behind the Eyes (1997)
- A Christmas to Remember (1999)
- Legacy... Hymns and Faith (2002)
- Simple Things (2003)
- Rock of Ages... Hymns and Faith (2005)
- Somewhere Down the Road (2010)
- How Mercy Looks from Here (2013)
- Tennessee Christmas (2016)
- The Me That Remains (2026)

Collaborative studio albums

- The Animals' Christmas (with Art Garfunkel) (1986)

== Bibliography ==
- Amy Grant's Heart to Heart Bible Stories; Worthy Pub (1985), ISBN 978-0-8344-0130-3
- Breath of Heaven (Mary's Song); W Publishing Group (2001), ISBN 0-8499-1732-8
- "The Creation" (narrator), in Rabbit Ears Beloved Bible Stories: the Creation, Noah and the Ark (audio book); Listening Library (Audio) (2006), ISBN 978-0-7393-3709-7
- Mosaic: Pieces of My Life So Far; Flying Dolphin Press (2007), ISBN 0-385-52289-4

== Awards and achievements ==
=== Grammy Awards ===
Year	Nominee / work	Award	Result
1979	My Father's Eyes	Best Gospel Performance, Contemporary or Inspirational	Nominated
1980	Never Alone	Best Gospel Performance, Contemporary or Inspirational	Nominated
1981	Amy Grant in Concert	Best Gospel Performance, Contemporary or Inspirational	Nominated
1982	Age to Age	Best Gospel Performance, Contemporary	Won
1983	Ageless Medley	Best Gospel Vocal Performance, Female	Won
1984	"Angels"	Best Gospel Vocal Performance, Female	Won
1985	Unguarded	Best Gospel Vocal Performance, Female	Won
1985	"I Could Never Say Goodbye"	Best Gospel Vocal Performance by a Duo or Group, Choir or Chorus	Nominated
1987	"The Next Time I Fall"	Best Pop Performance by a Duo or Group with Vocal	Nominated
1988	Lead Me On	Best Gospel Vocal Performance, Female	Won
1989	"'Tis So Sweet to Trust in Jesus"	Best Gospel Vocal Performance, Female	Nominated
1992	Heart in Motion	Album of the Year	Nominated
1992	"Baby Baby"	Song of the Year	Nominated
1992	"Baby Baby"	Record of the Year	Nominated
1992	"Baby Baby"	Best Female Pop Vocal Performance	Nominated
1994	The Creation	Best Spoken Word Album for Children	Nominated
2000	"When I Look Into Your Heart"	Best Country Collaboration with Vocals	Nominated
2005	Rock of Ages... Hymns and Faith	Best Southern, Country or Bluegrass Gospel Album	Won
2012	"Threaten Me with Heaven"	Best Country Song	Nominated

=== GMA Dove Awards ===
- 1983: Artist of the Year
- 1983: Pop/Contemporary Album of the Year – Age to Age
- 1983: Recorded Music Packaging – Age to Age
- 1984: Recorded Music Packaging – A Christmas Album
- 1985: Pop/Contemporary Album of the Year – Straight Ahead
- 1986: Artist of the Year
- 1986: Recorded Music Packaging – Unguarded
- 1988: Short Form Music Video of the Year – "Stay For a While"
- 1989: Artist of the Year
- 1989: Pop/Contemporary Album of the Year – Lead Me On
- 1989: Short Form Music Video of the Year – "Lead Me On"
- 1990: Country Song of the Year – "Tis So Sweet to Trust in Jesus"
- 1992: Song of the Year – "Place in This World"
- 1992: Artist of the Year
- 1994: Praise and Worship Album of the Year – Songs from the Loft
- 1996: Special Event Album of the Year – My Utmost for His Highest
- 1998: Pop/Contemporary Album of the Year – Behind the Eyes
- 2000: Special Event Album of the Year – Streams
- 2003: Inspirational Album of the Year – Legacy...Hymns & Faith
- 2003: Song of the Year – "The River's Gonna Keep on Rolling"
- 2006: Inspirational Album of the Year – Rock of Ages...Hymns & Faith
- 2007: Long Form Music Video of the Year – Time Again... Amy Grant Live

=== Special awards and recognitions ===
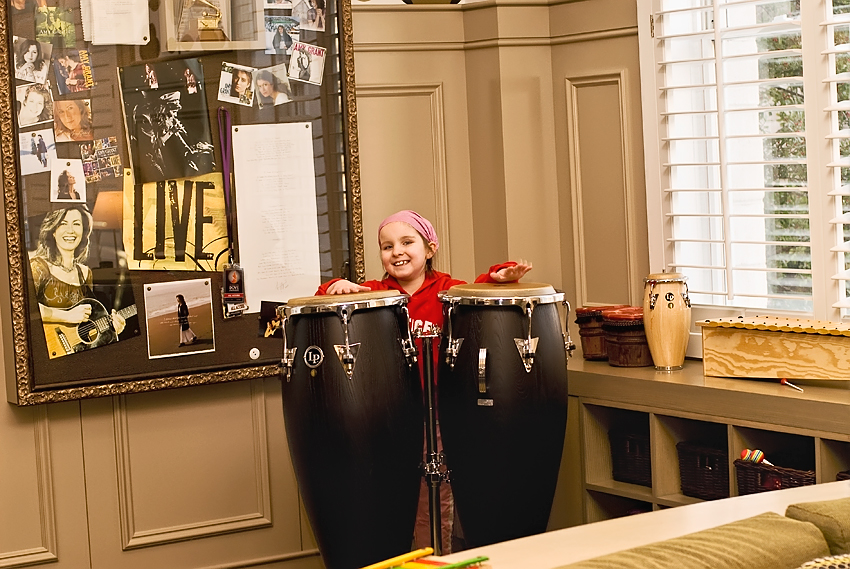
A child playing congas in the Amy Grant Music Room at St. Jude Children's Research Hospital

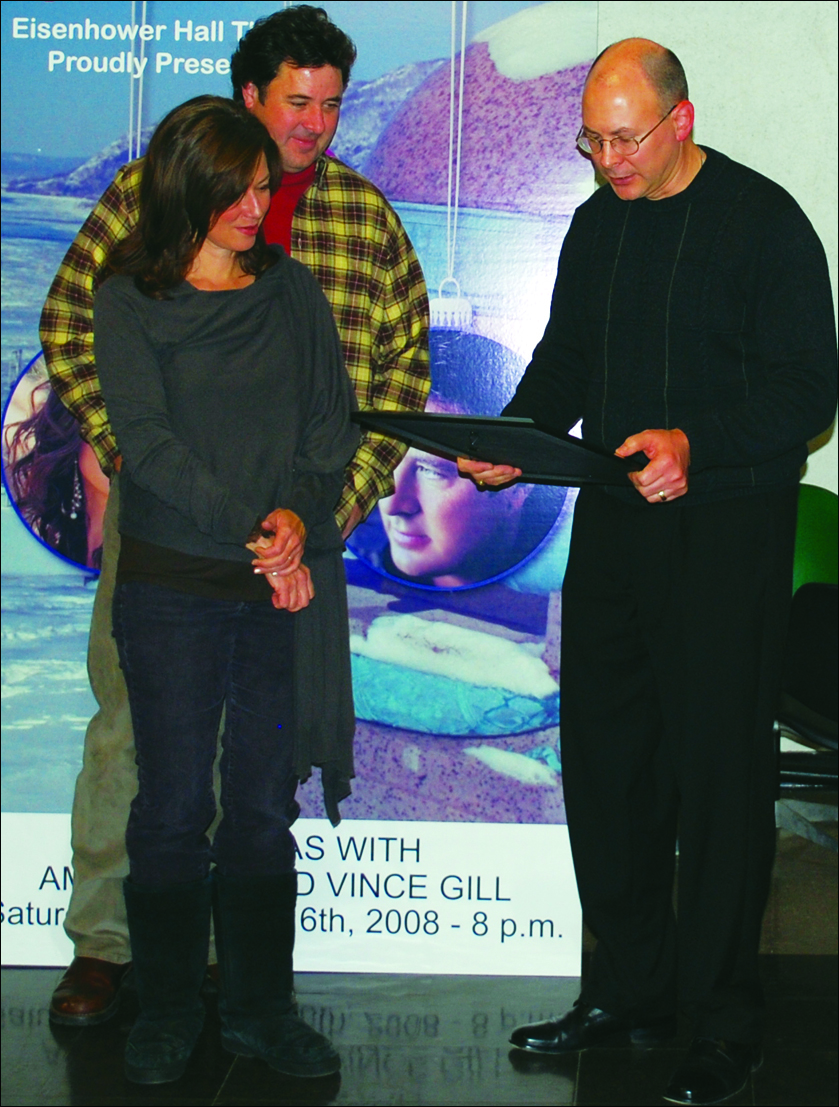
Grant and husband Vince Gill being awarded the Class of 1966 Friend of West Point Award in 2008

- 1992: Junior Chamber of Commerce Young Tennessean of the Year
- 1994: St. John University Pax Christi Award
- 1994: Nashville Symphony Harmony Award
- 1996: Sarah Cannon Humanitarian Award – TNN Awards
- 1996: Minnie Pearl Humanitarian Award – Columbia Hospital
- 1996: Voice of America Award – ASCAP
- 1996: Academy of Achievement Golden Plate Award
- 1999: "An Evening with the Arts" Honor – The Nashville Chamber of Commerce, Nashville Symphony, and Tennessee Performing Arts Center
- 1999: The Amy Grant Room for Music and Entertainment – The Target House at St. Jude's Children's Hospital
- 2001: Easter Seals Nashvillian of the Year Award
- 2003: Inducted into the GMA Gospel Music Hall of Fame
- 2003: Summit Award – Seminar in the Rockies
- 2006: Amy Grant Performance Platform – Nashville Schermerhorn Symphony Center
- 2006: Hollywood Walk of Fame star unveiled
- 2007: Charter member of Tiffany Circle – Red Cross
- 2007: Inducted into the Christian Music Hall of Fame
- 2008: Class of 1966 Friend of West Point award with Vince Gill
- 2012: Honorary Doctorate Degree of Music and Performance – Grand Canyon University
- 2015: No. 52 in The Top 100 Female Artists of the Rock Era (1955–2015)
- 2022: Kennedy Center Honoree
- 2023 Honorary Doctorate in Fine Arts – University of Notre Dame

== See also ==
- List of barefooters
