= Good for Me (song) =

1992 single by Amy Grant

Single by Amy Grant

from the album Heart in Motion
- Released: January 13, 1992
- Genre: CCM
- Length: 3:59
- Label: A&M
- Songwriters: Amy Grant; Tom Snow; Jay Gruska; Wayne Kirkpatrick
- Producer: Keith Thomas

Amy Grant singles chronology
"Ask Me" (1991)	"Good for Me" (1992)	"I Will Remember You" (1992)

Music video
- "Good for Me" on YouTube

"Good for Me" is a song by American singer-songwriter Amy Grant, released in January 1992 by A&M Records as the sixth overall single from her ninth album, Heart in Motion (1991). It is co-written by Grant and produced by Keith Thomas. The song was her fourth consecutive top-five Adult Contemporary single and top-10 Hot 100 single in the United States, reaching numbers four and eight, respectively. In the United Kingdom, it peaked at number 60.

== Composition ==
The song is in major scale and uses the subtonic chord. Grant included Mario Andretti's name in the lyrics, and subsequently was invited to sit in the Andretti family skybox at the 1992 Indianapolis 500.

== Music videos ==
Two music videos exist for "Good for Me". In the original video clip, Amy Grant frolicks and dances with another female, who was meant to be portrayed as a childhood friend of Grant's. However, once the video was completed, Grant reportedly felt that her intended message was lost and that the video had been edited in a way to make it appear as though she and her friend were lovers. The original version of the video was directed by D.J. Webster and edited by Scott C. Wilson.

Grant enlisted the help of actor/model Jme Stein, who had played her boyfriend in the video for "Baby Baby," to shoot a new video clip for "Good for Me". The new clip for the song was also directed by D.J. Webster. The second version depicts Grant dealing with her boyfriend's popularity with women. The original "Good for Me" video did appear on first pressings of the companion VHS video compilation to Heart in Motion, but only the second video was featured on the 2004 DVD collection Greatest Videos 1986–2004.

== Track listings ==
- Canada, UK, US Cassette Single
1. "Good for Me" (7" Good for You Mix)
2. "Good for Me" (7" You Like to Dance Mix)
- UK CD1
1. "Good for Me" (7-inch Good for You mix)
2. "Good for Me" (7-inch So Good mix)
3. "Good for Me" (Dub So Good mix)
4. "Good for Me" (7-inch You Like to Dance mix)
- UK CD2
1. "Good for Me" (7-inch Good for You mix)
2. "Good for Me" (12-inch You Like to Dance mix)
3. "Good for Me" (You Like to Dub mix)
4. "Good for Me" (album version)
- US 12 Inch Record
1. "Good for Me" (12-inch So Good Mix)
2. "Good for Me" (Dub So Good Mix)
3. "Good for Me" (12-inch You Like to Dance Mix)
4. "Good for Me" (You Like to Dub Mix)
5. "Good for Me" (7-inch Good For You Mix)

== Personnel ==
- Amy Grant – lead vocals
- Keith Thomas – synthesizers, bass, drum and percussion programming, backing vocals
- Brian Tankersley – additional synthesizer programming
- Jerry McPherson – guitars
- Mark Hammond – drum and percussion programming
- Ron Hemby – backing vocals
- Donna McElroy – backing vocals

== Charts ==
=== Weekly charts ===
Chart (1992)	Peak position
Australia (ARIA)	65
UK Singles (OCC)	60
UK Airplay (Music Week)	20
US Billboard Hot 100	8
US Adult Contemporary (Billboard)	4
US Cash Box Top 100	4
US Pop (Radio and Records)	3

=== Year-end charts ===
Chart (1992)	Position
US Billboard Hot 100	52
US Adult Contemporary (Billboard)	22
US Cash Box Top 100	33

== Release history ==
Region	Date	Format(s)	Label(s)	Ref.
United States	January 13, 1992	12-inch vinyl; cassette	A&M	
United Kingdom	February 3, 1992	7-inch vinyl; 12-inch vinyl; CD; cassette	A&M	
Australia	March 2, 1992	CD; cassette	A&M	
