= Gary Chapman (musician) =

- Born: Gary Winther Chapman; August 19, 1957 (age 69); Waurika, Oklahoma, U.S.
- Origin: Nashville, Tennessee
- Genre: Contemporary Christian
- Occupations: Singer, songwriter
- Instruments: Vocals, guitar
- Years active: 1979–present
- Spouses: Amy Grant (m. 1982; div. 1999); Jennifer Pittman (m. 2000; div. 2007); Cassie Piersol (m. 2008)

Gary Winther Chapman (born August 19, 1957) is an American contemporary Christian music singer-songwriter and former television talk show host.

== Early life and music career ==
Born in Waurika, Oklahoma, Chapman grew up in De Leon, Texas, the son of an Assemblies of God pastor, Rev. Terry W. Chapman, who ministered for 56 years before his death in 2009.

Chapman moved to Nashville, Tennessee, and was later hired as guitar player for The Rambos. In 1979, his song "Father's Eyes" was recorded as the title track to Amy Grant's Grammy-nominated second album My Father's Eyes. In 1982, his song "Finally", recorded by T. G. Sheppard, reached No. 1 on the country music charts. He also received a Dove Award as Songwriter of the Year from the Gospel Music Association in 1981.

During the rest of the 1980s and the early 1990s, Chapman continued to write, record, and produce music, while touring as an opening act for various artists. He sang "Brave Hearts" in 1987 for the Touchstone Pictures film Ernest Goes to Camp. He also collaborated with numerous artists in the singing of "Amazing Grace" in the 1994 film Maverick.

He was nominated for a Grammy Award for Best Pop/Contemporary Gospel Album in 1994 for The Light Inside. The album also resulted in a Dove Award nomination for Male Vocalist of the Year, and yielded a contemporary Christian music chart No. 1 song, "Sweet Glow of Mercy." He won a second Dove Award in 1994 for co-producing the album Songs from the Loft, featuring various artists.

In April 1996, Chapman won Male Vocalist of the Year at the GMA Dove Awards. His 1996 album, Shelter, delivered another No. 1, "One of Two", with "Man After Your Own Heart" resulting in a Dove Award for Inspirational Recorded Song of the Year and featuring on the Dove Award-winning Special Event Album of the Year, My Utmost for His Highest. Shelter also received a 1997 Grammy nomination for Best Pop/Contemporary Gospel Album. At the 1998 Dove Awards, his album Hymns From The Ryman, featuring him and other artists, won Country Album of the Year.

== Television career ==
In the middle of 1996, The Nashville Network announced that Chapman would replace Tom Wopat as host of their evening talk show, Prime Time Country. The show ended after 1999. Chapman went on to produce Muzik Mafia on CMT as well as appearing numerous times on the network's Gone Country as a songwriting mentor. Chapman, along with John Rich and Big Kenny (the country duo Big and Rich) traveled to Vietnam to document the story of Niles Harris, a Vietnam veteran, in the production of The 8th of November: A True Story of Pain and Honor. Chapman produced, wrote, directed, and scored the documentary.

== Radio show host ==
Gary Chapman hosted the weekly syndicated program CCM Countdown.

== Personal life ==
Chapman married Amy Grant on June 19, 1982. Grant filed for divorce from Chapman in March 1999, citing "irreconcilable differences", and the divorce was finalized in June 1999.

Chapman married Jennifer Pittman in July 2000. Chapman and Pittman divorced in 2007.

On December 22, 2008, Chapman married Cassie Piersol. The couple began a project called A Hymn a Week in 2010 to honor the musical heritage left to Chapman by his parents. Chapman's mother Mary died on December 26, 2002. His father Terry died on April 12, 2009, after a lengthy battle with Parkinson's disease and multiple myeloma. During his last years, he lived with Chapman and Piersol, and Chapman played and sang old hymns at his father's bedside. Being asked to perform a hymn at a friend's funeral inspired him to begin compiling a brief history and personal connection to a different hymn each week, on a webpage that he titled A Hymn a Week.

Chapman has three children with Grant. He and his third wife, Cassie Piersol Chapman, adopted an infant girl in March 2014.

He is a licensed helicopter pilot, and once surprised his friend and fellow Christian singer/songwriter Steven Curtis Chapman (no relation) by landing in his yard.

Chapman and his wife are involved in many charities and organizations, including the Nashville Rescue Mission, Agape Animal Rescue, the T.J. Martell Foundation, and the Make-A-Wish Foundation.

== Discography ==
=== Albums ===
Year	Title	Peak chart positions			Label
Year	Title	US CCM	US	US Heat	Label
1981	Sincerely Yours				Lamb & Lion
1983	Happenin'... Live				Lamb & Lion
1987	Everyday Man	26			Reunion
1994	The Light Inside	10			Reunion
1996	The Early Years				Lamb & Lion
1996	Shelter	7	192	12	Reunion
1997	This Gift	16		16	Reunion
1998	Hymns from the Ryman				Word
1999	Outside				Reunion
2002	The Best of Gary Chapman: After God's Own Heart				Reunion
2002	Circles and Seasons				Word
2013	The Truth				Elevate Entertainment

=== Singles ===
Year	Single	US Country	Album
1988	"When We're Together (Love's So Strong)"	60	Everyday Man
1988	"Everyday Man"	76	Everyday Man
