= AI slop =

Low-quality AI-generated digital content

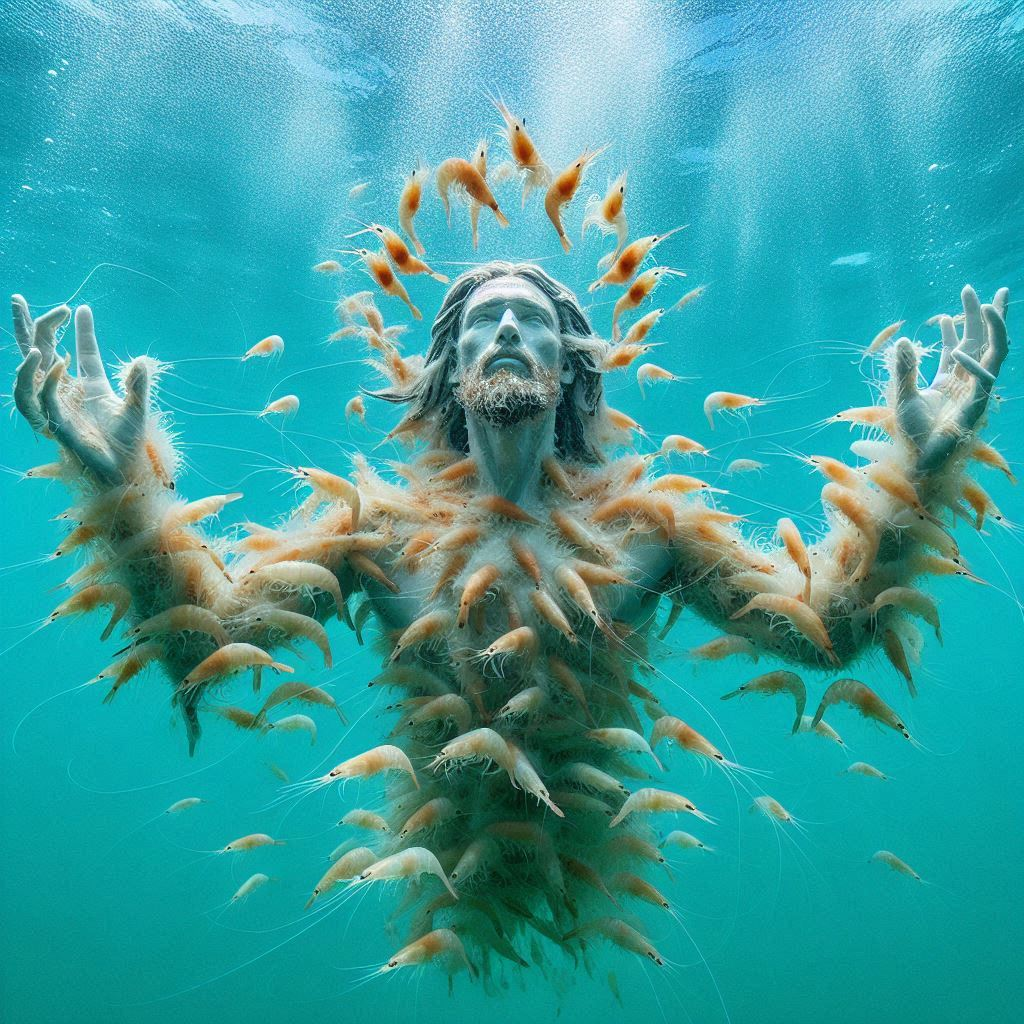
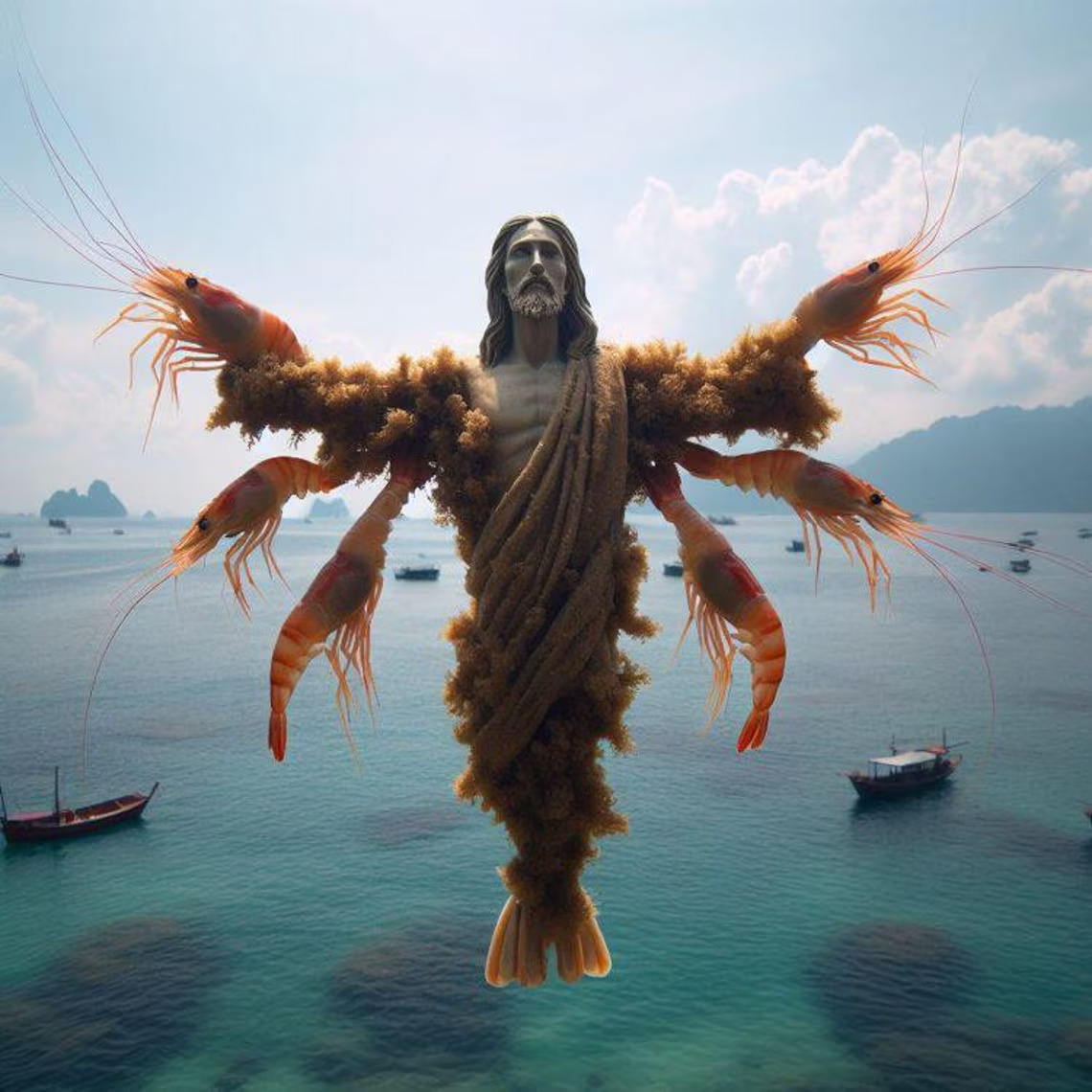
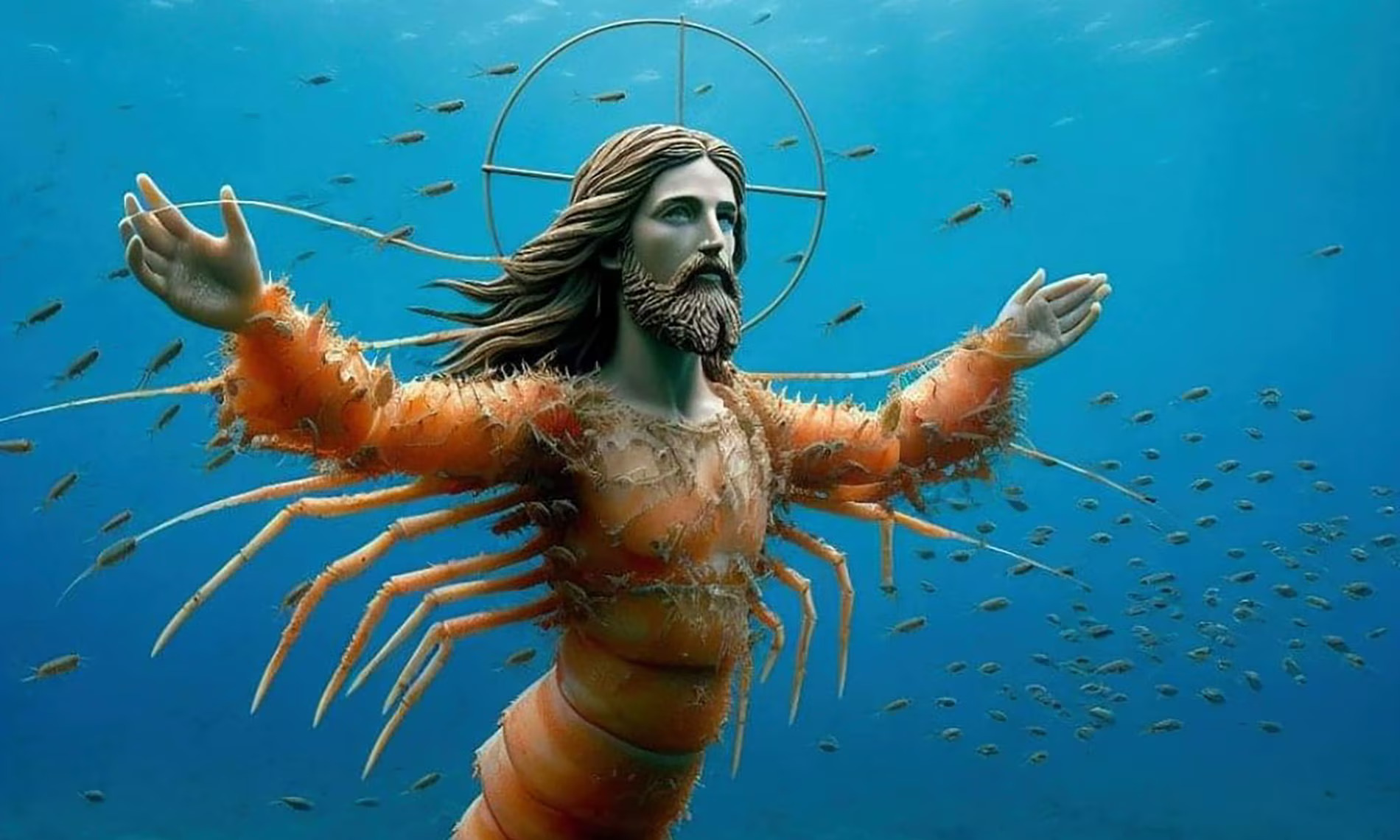
AI-generated images of "Shrimp Jesus" proliferated on Facebook in 2024.

AI slop is an internet slang referring to digital content made with generative artificial intelligence that is perceived as lacking in effort, quality or meaning, and usually produced in high volume to gain advantage, to earn money, or to deceive people. It is a form of synthetic media usually linked to the monetization in the creator economy of social media and online advertising. Coined in the 2020s, the term has a pejorative connotation similar to spam. "Slop" was selected as the 2025 Word of the Year by both Merriam-Webster and the American Dialect Society.

AI slop has been defined as "digital clutter", "filler content prioritizing speed and quantity over substance and quality", and "shoddy or unwanted AI content in social media, art, books [and] search results". Jonathan Gilmore, a philosophy professor at the City University of New York, describes AI slop as having an "incredibly banal, realistic style" that is easy for the viewer to process. The effect of increasing AI slop on the web has been likened to the increase in entropy as driven by the Second Law of Thermodynamics.

== Origin of the term ==
As early large language models (LLMs) and image diffusion models accelerated the creation of high-volume but low-quality text and images, discussion commenced among journalists and on social platforms for the appropriate term for the influx of material. Terms proposed included "AI garbage", "AI pollution", and "AI-generated dross". Early uses of the term "slop" as a descriptor for low-grade AI material apparently came in reaction to the release of AI image generators in 2022. Its early use has been noted among 4chan, Hacker News, and YouTube commentators as a form of in-group slang.

The British computer programmer Simon Willison is credited with being an early champion of the term "slop" in the mainstream, having used it on his personal blog in May 2024. However, he has said it was in use long before he began pushing for the term. The term gained increased popularity in the second quarter of 2024 in part because of Google's use of its Gemini AI model to generate responses to search queries, and the large quantities of slop on the internet were widely criticized in media headlines during the fourth quarter of 2024. It is also used in compound terms; one such example is "Microslop", used in response to increasing integration of the Microsoft Copilot chatbot into the Windows operating system.

== Definitions ==
To understand modern slop, you have to think of humans as consuming content in the same way that pigs consume food. The goal of pig slop is to maximize nutrient intake while minimizing cost; the goal of A.I. slop is to maximize time spent consuming content while minimizing cost. There's comedy slop, literary slop, art slop, niche slop, slop for kids, political slop—but the substance of slop always matters less than the fact that you’re looking at it.

— Oliver Whang, The New York Times

According to an academic article by Cody Kommers and five other scholars that was published in January 2026, AI slop has "so far resisted formal definition." Although they argue it is impossible to precisely describe a boundary between slop and non-slop, Kommers et al. identify three "prototypical properties" that characterise AI slop: superficial competence, asymmetric effort and mass producibility.

Beyond these family resemblances, there are many different kinds of AI slop. Three main "dimensions of variance", or ways in which AI slop can vary, are its instrumental utility (why was it created?), the level of personalization (is it so specific as to only be interesting to one person or a small friend group?) and the level of surrealism, where some AI slop is "ludicrously implausible", while other slop is more realistic. Art curator Francesco D'Isa considers "AI slop" to be a misleading term, as it implies AI is inherently worse than artistic mediums such as painting. He sees the majority of human culture as having "always been slop", with the canon of art being "the surviving tip of an immense iceberg of forgotten, derivative, or simply boring creations".

== On social media ==
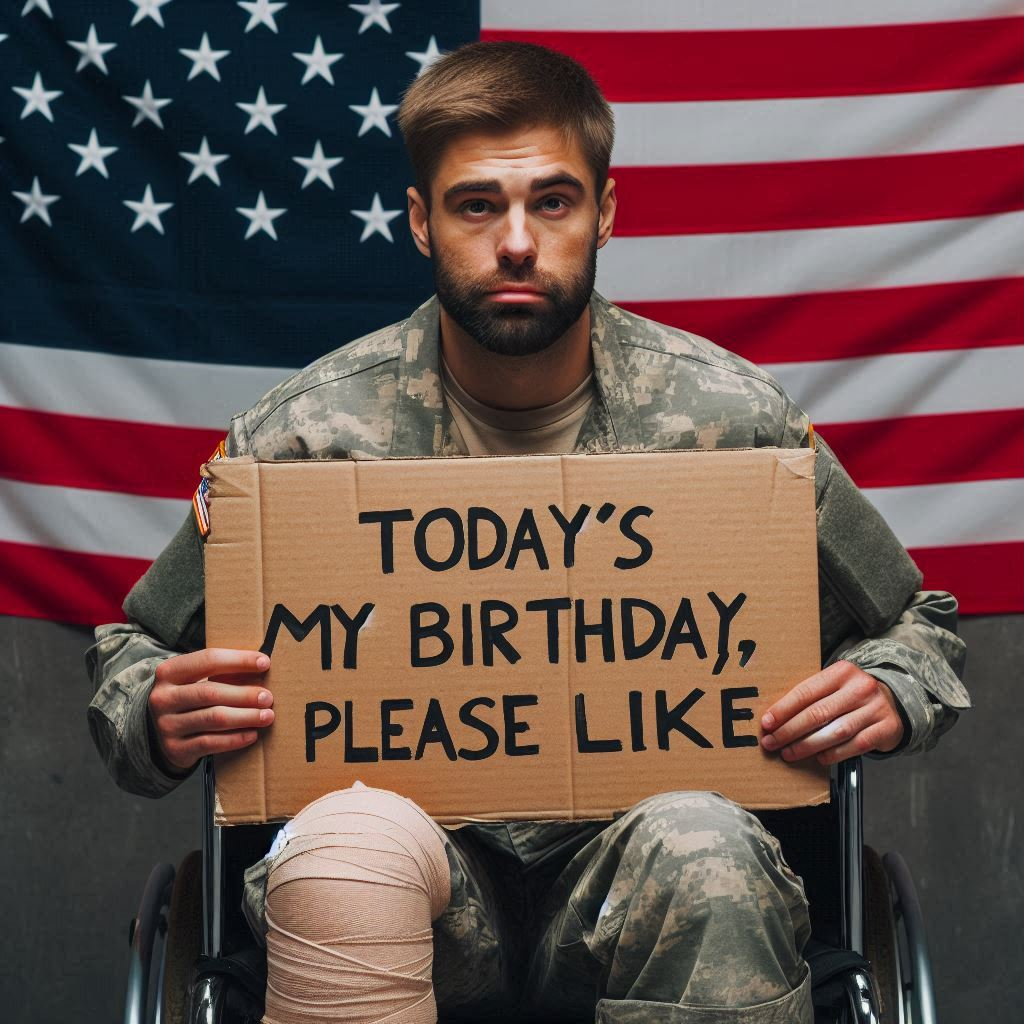
An AI-generated image depicting a wounded war veteran in front of an American flag, designed to receive sympathetic interactions from US audiences

AI image and video slop have proliferated on social media in part because it can generate revenue for its creators on Facebook and TikTok, most notably affecting Facebook. This incentivizes individuals from developing countries to create images that appeal to audiences in the United States, which attract higher advertising rates. A medical student in India said he made thousands of dollars each month from low effort, AI-generated images on Instagram and Fanvue. After his first attempt to go viral failed, he refined his social media posts to include MAGA rhetoric to appeal to conservative American men, creating the influencer character "Emily Hart" with AI. He tried the same tactic with a politically progressive message, but he said it was quickly rejected as "AI slop".

The journalist Jason Koebler speculated in an article for 404 Media that the bizarre nature of some of the content may be due to the creators using Hindi, Urdu, and Vietnamese prompts (languages which are underrepresented in the model's training data), or using erratic speech-to-text methods to translate their intentions into English. Speaking to New York magazine, a Kenyan creator of slop images described giving ChatGPT prompts such as "WRITE ME 10 PROMPT picture OF JESUS WHICH WILLING BRING HIGH ENGAGEMENT ON FACEBOOK [sic]", and then feeding those created prompts into a text-to-image AI model such as Midjourney.

AI-generated images of plants and plant care misinformation have proliferated on social media. Online retailers have used AI-generated images of flowers to sell seeds of plants that do not actually exist. Many online houseplant communities have banned AI-generated content but struggle to moderate large volumes of content posted by bots. Facebook spammers have been reported as AI-generating images of Holocaust victims with fake stories; in reality there are only a handful of historical photographs taken at Auschwitz concentration camp. The posters were described as "slop accounts", and the Auschwitz Memorial museum called the images a "dangerous distortion". History-focused Facebook groups also have been inundated with AI-generated "historical" photos.

Slopper, a pejorative slang term derived from "AI slop", was coined in 2025 to describe someone who is overly reliant on generative AI tools like ChatGPT. Users on social media have begun using AI-generated images to build massive followings by fooling viewers. This strategy has been popularized for those who are interested in an easy way to get an income online as all that is needed is one post, of the hundreds posted weekly, to gain traction and encourage the quickly made content. Some creators are frustrated that their hard work is being stolen by AI-generated content. An artist, Michael Jones, created physical wood carvings of animals using a chainsaw, but the style of the sculptures was taken by and used as a source for AI-generated content, which began to surface with other people beside them, claiming to have made the sculptures themselves. Jones stated that AI-slop is "a huge issue for carvers all over the world who are sadly missing out on the rightful credit exposure to their work..."

According to a 2025 report by video creation and editing service company Kapwing, South Korea ranks first worldwide in AI slop consumption. Experts say the phenomenon is driven by the country's rapid embrace of new technology. In January 2026, YouTube CEO Neal Mohan stated that reducing slop and detecting deepfakes were priorities for YouTube in 2026. A March 2026 investigation by The New York Times found that around 40% of videos recommended to children, both on the main platform and on YouTube Kids, appear to be AI slop, often with realistic or Cocomelon-style visuals. The videos often claim to be educational and are disproportionately about the English alphabet, but they often feature nonsensical and flashy content, such as oddly proportioned horses hatching from eggs. Around the same time, The 74 and Mother Jones released a report about children's videos on YouTube that feature disturbing content, contain misinformation such as misspelled words or misidentified objects, or depict imitable behavior that is dangerous. In March 2026, a TikTok account centered around an AI-generated parody of the reality show Love Island using AI-generated anthropomorphic fruits, called Fruit Love Island, became one of the fastest-growing accounts in the United States, leading to debate in online communities about monetization of AI-generated content.

== In politics ==
=== United States ===
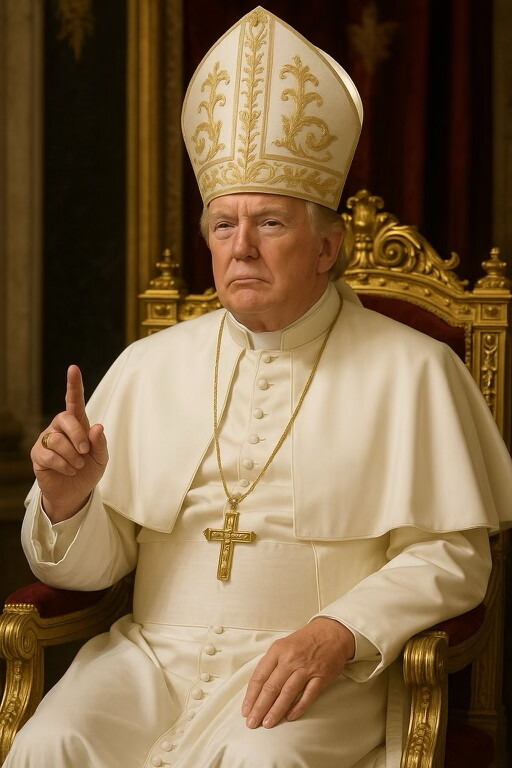
AI-generated image posted by Donald Trump depicting himself as pope

In August 2024, The Atlantic noted that AI slop was becoming associated with the political right in the United States, who were using it for shitposting and engagement farming on social media, with the technology offering "cheap, fast, on-demand fodder for content".

AI slop is frequently used in political campaigns in an attempt at gaining attention through content farming. In 2025, in the first five months of Donald Trump's second tenure as US president, Trump posted several AI-generated images of himself on official government social media accounts, such as images of him as the pope or as a muscular man brandishing a lightsaber. In August 2024, Trump posted a series of AI-generated images on his alt-tech social media platform, Truth Social, portraying fans of the pop singer Taylor Swift in "Swifties for Trump" T-shirts, as well as an AI-generated image of Swift appearing to endorse the Trump 2024 presidential campaign. The images originated from the conservative Twitter account @amuse, which posted numerous AI slop images leading up to the 2024 United States elections that were shared by other high-profile figures within the Republican Party, such as Elon Musk, who has publicly endorsed generative AI. In 2025, Wired described Trump as "The first AI slop President", noting his frequent use of AI-generated images and videos in public messaging. The magazine highlighted examples such as AI depictions of Trump as a fighter pilot and as a religious figure, arguing that his reliance on low-quality generative content marked a new phase in political communication.

In the aftermath of Hurricane Helene in 2024, Republican social media influencers such as Laura Loomer circulated an AI-generated image of a young girl holding a puppy in a flood, and used it as evidence of the purported failure of President Joe Biden to respond to the disaster. The Republican activist Amy Kremer shared the image while acknowledging it was not genuine. The initial version of the Make Our Children Healthy Again Assessment, a report on children's health issues released by a commission of cabinet members and officials of the Trump administration, and led by US Department of Health and Human Services Secretary Robert F. Kennedy Jr., reportedly cited nonexistent and garbled references generated using AI.

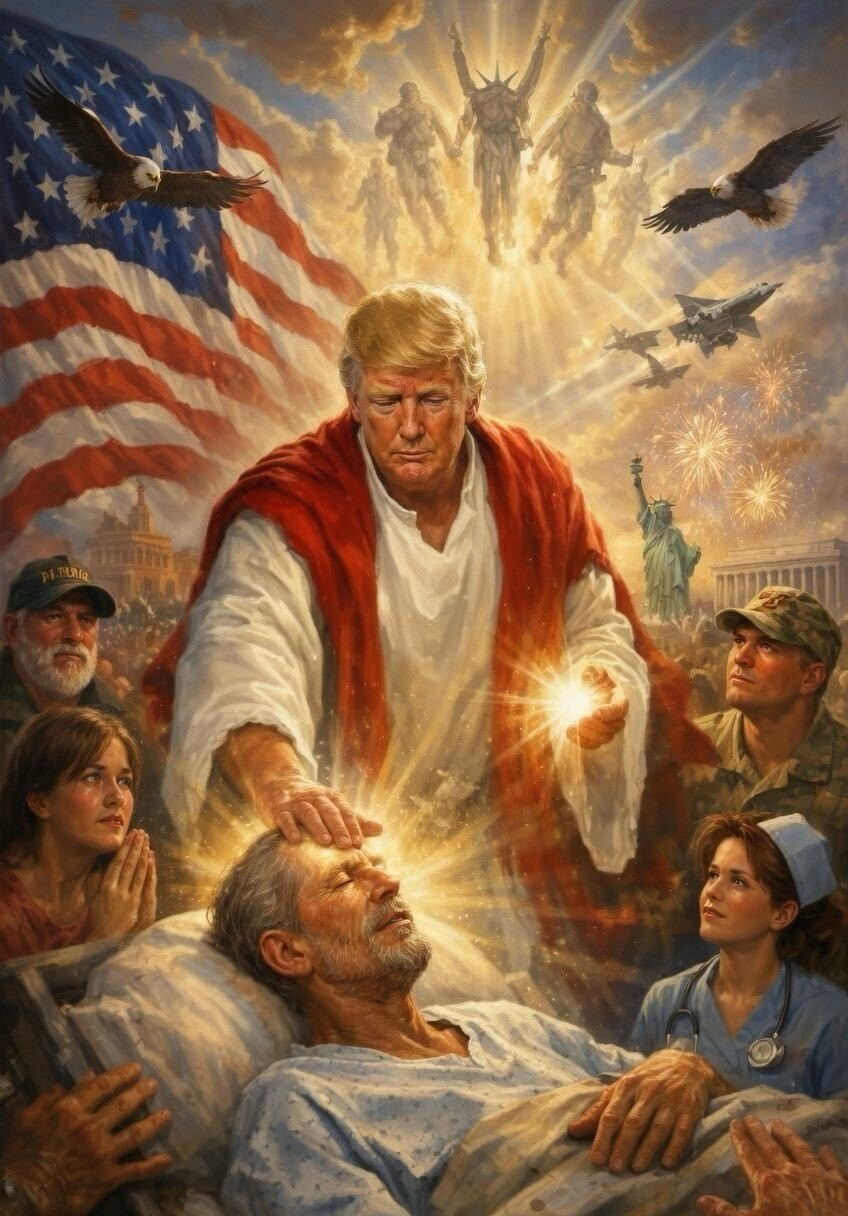
Trump posted this image to his Truth Social account on April 12, 2026 (Orthodox Easter). The post was deleted following backlash.

In February 2025, Trump shared an AI-generated video on Truth Social and Instagram depicting a hypothetical Gaza Strip after a Trump takeover. The video's creator said it was made as political satire. During the Gaza war, AI-generated media was used to exaggerate support for both sides, and to evoke sympathy using fake images of suffering civilians. Because of content restrictions in generative AI, these images and videos rarely depict people wounded in battle, instead focusing on damage to buildings. Fake images of attacks were used to avoid accidentally providing intelligence to enemies.

In response to the No Kings protests in October 2025, Trump posted a video depicting himself flying a fighter jet and releasing feces on crowds of demonstrators, including Harry Sisson, a Democratic influencer. In the midst of disruptions to food stamp distribution during the 2025 US government shutdown, anonymous social media users began using OpenAI's Sora AI model to post slop videos of "welfare queens" complaining, stealing, and rioting in supermarkets; many comments to the videos appeared unaware that they were AI-generated, or acknowledged that they were AI-generated but nonetheless useful in pushing a narrative of widespread welfare fraud. In April 2026, on Orthodox Easter, Trump posted a picture of himself depicted as Jesus, drawing widespread criticism from Evangelicals and Catholics, resulting in Trump deleting the post hours later and claiming he believed he was depicted as a doctor.

=== Russia and China ===
A study by the analytics company Graphika found that the Chinese and Russian governments have been using AI-generated slop as propaganda. This includes the use of "spamouflage" as AI-generated content in Western social media featuring fake influencers, which found to be linked to China. These videos often focused on divisive topics aimed to cause disruption with ulterior motives to the presented content.

=== Canada ===
On June 9, 2026, New Brunswick politician Bill Oliver gave a speech that included the sentence, "Here’s a more natural, flowing version of that section that reads like a legislative speech rather than a series of short points," which he spoke out loud. He apparently did not notice the error and continued reading the speech. Multiple other apparent AI–user communications were also spoken aloud by him during the speech, including "Here's a more developed and flowing version of the section" (in reference to a different section). A video of the incident went viral on social media, was described as AI slop, and sparked controversy and calls for him to resign.

== In advertising ==
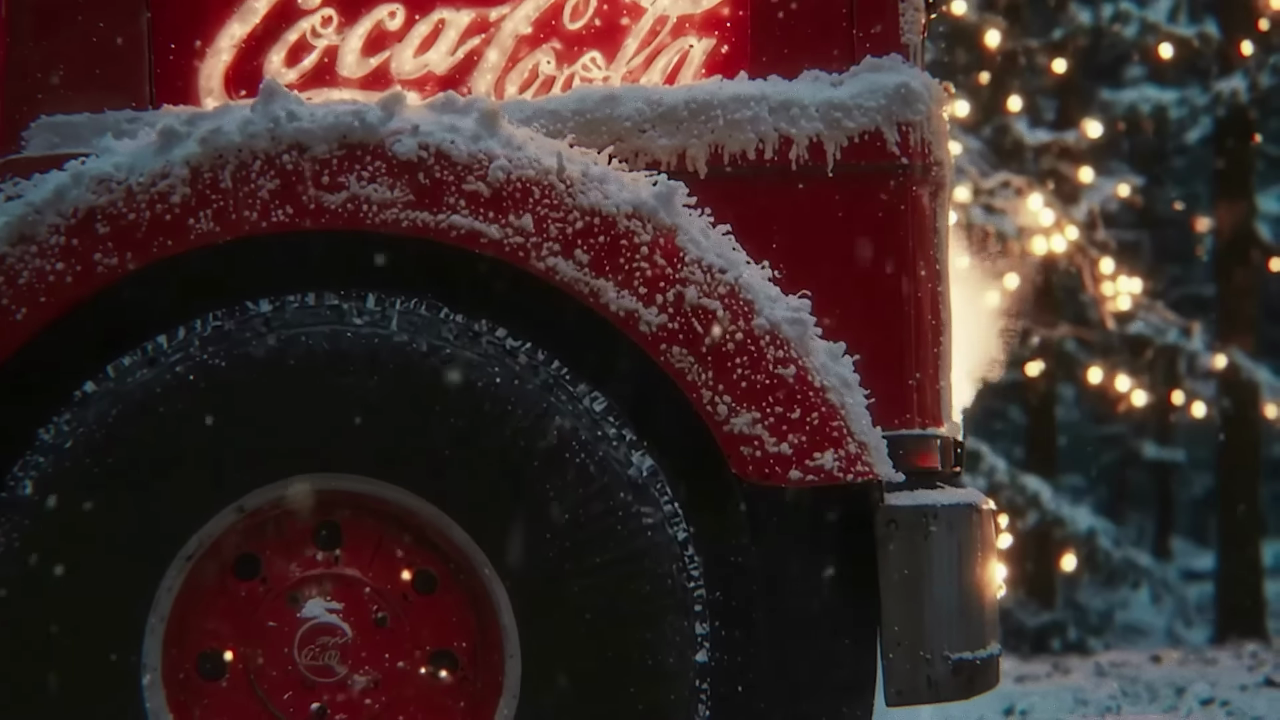
Still frame from one of the AI-assisted Coca-Cola holiday commercials in 2024, with the logo misspelled as "Coca-Coola"

In November 2024, the Coca-Cola Company used AI to create three commercials as part of their annual holiday campaign. These videos were immediately met with backlash from both casual viewers and artists; animator Alex Hirsch, creator of the television series Gravity Falls, criticized the company's decision not to employ human artists to create the commercial. In response to the negative feedback, the company defended their decision to use generative AI, stating that "Coca-Cola will always remain dedicated to creating the highest level of work at the intersection of human creativity and technology". Coca-Cola continued to utilize AI-generated commercials for their 2025 holiday campaign.

During the holiday season of 2025, McDonald's Netherlands released an AI-generated Christmas advertisement titled It's the Most Terrible Time of the Year, which was met with a large amount of backlash. The advert was seen as cynical, portraying Christmas time as "the most terrible time of the year". The company turned off comments on YouTube and later removed the initial upload of the video from public view in response, though reuploads of the original were still public on the site.

In March 2025, Paramount Pictures was criticized for using AI scripting and narration in an Instagram video promoting the film Novocaine. The ad uses a robotic AI voice in a style similar to low-quality AI spam videos produced by content farms. A24 received similar backlash for releasing a series of AI-generated posters for the 2024 film Civil War. One poster appears to depict a group of soldiers in a tank-like raft preparing to fire on a large swan, an image which does not resemble the events of the film.

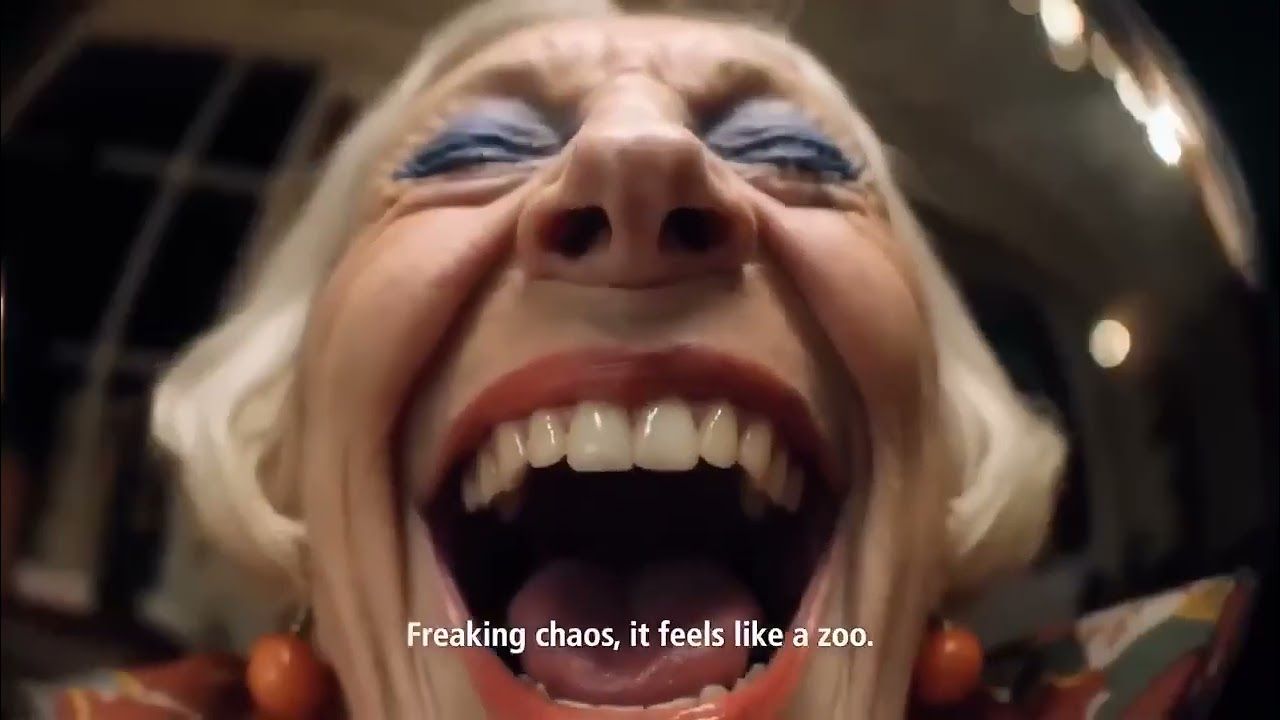
A still frame from It's the Most Terrible Time of the Year, a McDonald's advertisement generated by AI

In the same month, Activision posted various advertisements and posters for fake video games such as "Guitar Hero Mobile", "Crash Bandicoot: Brawl", and "Call of Duty: Zombie Defender" that were all made using generative AI on platforms such as Facebook and Instagram, which many labelled as AI slop. The intention of the posts was later stated to act as a survey for interest in possible titles by the company. The Italian brainrot AI trend was widely adopted by advertisers as an attempt to adjust to younger audiences.

During Super Bowl LX in the United States in 2026, the vodka brand Svedka aired an AI-generated commercial featuring two robots, apparently male and female, drinking Svedka while dancing at a club. The ad was met with heavy criticism from Super Bowl viewers, and many took to social media to express their disdain. Svedka claimed that the ad was a collaboration between AI and human creativity, as the AI was trained on a TikTok video that won an open call for dance routines. In March 2026, researchers at the cybersecurity firm DoubleVerify identified a network of more than 200 websites publishing AI-generated content. The operation, called "AutoBait", used templated prompts in a large language model to produce articles and images designed primarily to generate advertising revenue.

A food stall using AI-generated images on its menu in Shanghai, China

Some restaurants have used AI-generated images in their menus, with most people calling the images uncanny or unappetizing.

== In event listings ==
One of the Willy's Chocolate Experience advertisements, with uncorrected spelling errors, nonsensical words, and bizarre illustrations

Fantastical promotional graphics for the 2024 Willy's Chocolate Experience event, which took place in Glasgow, characterized as "AI-generated slop", misled audiences into attending an event that was held in a sparsely decorated warehouse. Tickets were marketed through Facebook advertisements showing AI-generated imagery, with no genuine photographs of the venue.

In October 2024, thousands of people were reported to have assembled for a non-existent Halloween parade in Dublin as a result of a listing on an aggregation listings website, MySpiritHalloween.com, which used AI-generated content. The listing went viral on TikTok and Instagram. A similar parade had previously been held in Galway. Dublin had hosted parades in prior years, although there was no parade in 2024. One analyst characterized the website, which appeared to use AI-generated staff pictures, as likely using AI "to create content quickly and cheaply where opportunities are found". The site's owner said, "We asked ChatGPT to write the article for us, but it wasn't ChatGPT by itself." In the past the site had removed non-existent events when contacted by their venues, but in the case of the Dublin parade the site owner said that "no one reported that this one wasn't going to happen". MySpiritHalloween.com updated their page to say that the parade had been "canceled" when they became aware of the issue.

== In books ==
Online booksellers and library vendors now have many titles that are written by AI and are not curated into collections by librarians. The digital media provider Hoopla, which supplies libraries with ebooks and downloadable content, has generative AI books with fictional authors and dubious quality, which cost libraries money when checked out by unsuspecting patrons.

Users of Amazon Kindle and other ebook sites have reported concerns with the increased output of novels seemingly created artificially. Author Jane Friedman stated she had to report 29 novels in one week which were created by AI but used her name and likeness. Kindle created a limit of three novels per day from a single author to combat the issue.

On Amazon, there are many AI-generated mushroom foraging books being sold. These books often contain inaccurate and distorted AI-generated images of mushrooms, as well as text likely written by ChatGPT. Many of these books include fake, AI-generated authors as well. Experts warn that, due to the risk of mushroom poisoning, this is extremely dangerous. In 2023, the New York Mycological Society issued a statement about AI-generated mushroom books on social media, stating that misidentification could "literally mean life or death".

In February 2023, the science-fiction magazine Clarkesworld had to temporarily close short story submissions after receiving massive amounts of AI spam, which editor Neil Clarke attributed to people from outside the speculative fiction community trying to make easy money. Clarke expressed worry that this trend would result in higher barriers of entry for new authors. LLMs trained on similar data often produce similar-sounding stories, leading to the phenomenon of a lighthouse keeper named Elias Thorne, who shows up in a disproportionate number of stories generated by multiple LLMs. When this slop floods Amazon and LLMs are trained on this new data, it can cause model collapse and reinforce stories featuring Thorne as a lighthouse keeper.

"Non-fiction" biographies have become prominent on Amazon, often containing fabrications and inaccuracies. During elections in various countries, inaccurate AI written biographies of politicians have been noted to appear, for instance during the 2026 Scottish Parliament election one such book claimed that John Swinney was born in the United States to Polish immigrant parents. A 2024 CBC poll found that 18% of voters in Alberta and Saskatchewan mistake such books as legitimate works.

== In video games ==
Call of Duty: Black Ops 6 includes assets generated by AI. Since the game's initial release, many players had accused Treyarch and Raven Software of using AI to create in-game assets, including loading screens, emblems, and calling cards. A particular example was a loading screen for the zombies game mode that depicted "Necroclaus", a zombified Santa Claus with six fingers on one hand, among other irregularities. The previous entry in the franchise, Call of Duty: Modern Warfare III, was also accused of selling AI-generated cosmetics. In February 2025, Activision disclosed Black Ops 6's usage of generative AI to comply with Valve's policies on AI-generated or assisted products on Steam. Activision states on the game's product page on Steam that "Our team uses generative AI tools to help develop some in game assets." Call of Duty: Black Ops continued the usage of AI-generated content with Studio Ghibli-styled calling cards, which have been criticized by fans.

In 2024, Rovio Entertainment released a demo of a mobile game called Angry Birds: Block Quest on Android. The game featured AI-generated images for loading screens and backgrounds. It was heavily criticized by players, who called it shovelware and disapproved of Rovio's use of AI images. It was eventually discontinued and removed from the Play Store. According to a 2025 report by AI and Games, about 20% of games published on Steam in 2025 include an "AI disclosure", indicating they use generative AI tools for some assets. The same report uses explicitly the term "AI shovelware problem", arguing that many of these games rely heavily on AI-generated visuals (textures, images, dialogue, story bits, etc.), often with mixed or poor quality.

Some indie game developers commented that there were attempts at copying footage or game demos of indie games with AI, in some cases being released to market before the original games have been. Alliance Arts cancelled releasing public demos of Drunken Goddess Reflux due to worries over having its work copied by AI.

During the Steam 2026 Next Fest, an online event for showcasing game demos, it was noted that a vast amount of AI generated games were shown. The number of games showcased during the event drastically increased over the last few years, from around 900 in 2023 to over 7,000 in 2026, with many disclosed as partially or majority AI generated. AI disclosure policies on steam have shown that by November of 2026 49.9% of games on the platform are now AI Generated to some degree. Epic Games also allows AI generated games to appear on the storefront and has rejected imposing restrictions on them.

== In film and television ==
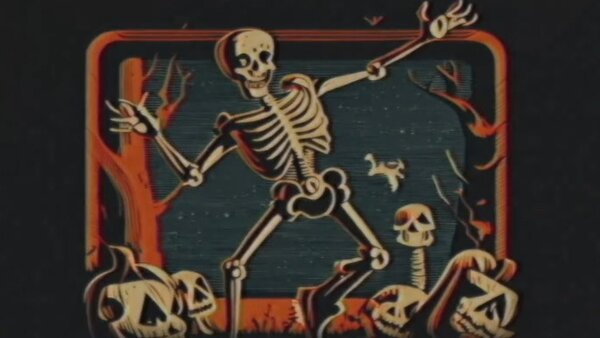
AI-generated image in a screenshot from Late Night with the Devil

Some films have received backlash for including AI-generated content. The film Late Night with the Devil was criticized by some reviewers for its use of AI-generated images. Several AI-generated images were used as interstitial title cards, with one image featuring a skeleton with inaccurate bone structure and fingers that appear disconnected from its hands.

Some streaming services, such as Amazon Prime Video, have used AI to generate slop posters and thumbnail images. A low-quality AI poster was used for the 1922 film Nosferatu, depicting Count Orlok in a way that does not resemble his look in the film. A thumbnail image for 12 Angry Men on Amazon Freevee used AI to depict 19 men with smudged faces, none of whom appeared to bear any similarities to the characters in the film. Additionally, some viewers have noticed that many plot descriptions appear to be generated by AI, which some people have characterized as slop. One synopsis briefly listed on the site for the film Dog Day Afternoon read: "A man takes hostages at a bank in Brooklyn. Unfortunately I do not have enough information to summarize further within the provided guidelines." Amazon Prime Video published a recap of season one of the dystopian sci-fi TV show Fallout. It was removed after audiences noticed mistakes, including claims that a scene set in 2077 was set in the 1950s.

In one case, Deutsche Telekom removed a series from their media offerings after viewers complained about the bad quality and monotonous German voice dubbing (translated from original Polish) and it was found out that it was done via AI.

In March 2025, Carsey-Werner upscaled Roseanne and A Different World using generative AI. This process distorted text in the background, rendering it illegible. The 2026 web series On This Day... 1776, produced by Darren Aronofsky, was created with AI generated visuals and Screen Actors Guild voice actors. It was widely panned by critics with many calling it "slop". In March 2026, WildBrain had upconverted various series with an AI upscaler, including The Super Mario Bros. Super Show!. When it aired on MeTV Toons, viewers found that, among other problems, the upscaling model had not handled text properly, thus making the opening title read "Suele Mario Bros" instead.

== In music ==
Large volumes of AI-generated tracks have been uploaded with the aim of manipulating streaming platform royalties. For example, in September 2024 Michael Smith of North Carolina was charged with wire fraud conspiracy after using hundreds of thousands of AI-generated songs and bots to generate more than US$10 million in royalties. In June 2025, Deezer estimated that as much as 70% of streams of AI-generated tracks on its platform were fraudulent, highlighting concerns about mass low-quality output competing with human-made music.

In April 2024, Pink Floyd held a fan-made music video contest for tracks from the Dark Side of the Moon album to celebrate the band's 50th anniversary. Among ten chosen entries, the music video for the track "Any Colour You Like" was noted for being made using the Stable Diffusion software, prompting online backlash from fans against the band and the video's submitter for its AI-generated nature as well as its perceived low quality.

In November 2024, Kanye West released an unexpected music video for the song "Bomb" from Vultures 2, featuring AI-generated versions of his daughters, North West and Chicago West. The video shows the children racing through a desert in futuristic Cybertruck-like vehicles, with both providing vocals—North partly in Japanese and Chicago in a freestyle style. The release drew widespread debate, with many fans criticizing West's increasing reliance on AI and specifically referring to the project as "AI slop", expressing discomfort with the use of AI replicas of his children.

In July 2025, numerous media outlets reported on accusations that an indie band named the Velvet Sundown, which in only a few weeks had amassed over 850,000 listeners on Spotify, was AI-generated. Critics observed that there were no records of any performances by the band, that individual band members had no social media presence, and that their promotional images appeared to be fake. Deezer's AI detection tool flagged the band's music as being 100% AI-generated. Rolling Stone (which described the Velvet Sundown as "obviously fictional") had reported that a spokesperson for the band named Andrew Frelon had admitted that their music was an "art hoax" generated using the AI tool Suno. However, Frelon later stated that his statement was itself a hoax and that he had no connection to the band. However, within a week, the Velvet Sundown's artist biography on Spotify had been updated to say that the band was "a synthetic music project guided by human creative direction, and composed, voiced, and visualized with the support of artificial intelligence", intended as "artistic provocation". By this time, the band had over one million monthly listeners on Spotify. According to a former Spotify employee, the high listener count has two likely causes: firstly, Spotify now accepts payments to boost playlist placement, and secondly, playlists are increasingly selected by algorithms rather than humans.

In August 2025, "Aprimi il culo", an AI-generated song by the Italian music project Cantoscena, reached number one on Spotify's Viral 50 Italia chart. A later study of the project noted divergent responses to AI disclosure, ranging from dismissive judgments about creative labor and artistic value associated with the label “AI slop” to increased interest among other listeners in the music’s treatment of nostalgia and misinformation.

AI has also been used to impersonate established musicians and release music on major streaming services under their name without their knowledge, presumably to make money from streaming royalties. In particular, in August 2025, a number of Americana and folk-rock musicians, including Jeff Tweedy, Father John Misty, and Blaze Foley (who died in 1989) were impersonated, as well as some established US Christian musicians and metalcore bands. The fake releases all had similar AI-generated cover art and were credited to the same three record labels. Many listed "Zyan Maliq Mahardika" as a songwriter, indicating that the impersonation has a single source. Spotify removed the tracks, stating that they "violated our policy against impersonating another person or brand".

In November 2025, the AI-generated song "Walk My Walk" topped the Billboard's country digital song sales chart in the United States with 3,000 sales. The song is by AI artist Breaking Rust, who amassed over 4.5 million Spotify listeners on their songs. Promotion for "Walk My Walk" was accompanied by an AI slop video shared on Instagram depicting a cowboy walking into the sunset. In the same month, an AI-generated song named "We Are Charlie Kirk", made in tribute to the assassination of Charlie Kirk two months earlier, went viral on TikTok and ranked #1 on Spotify's viral songs chart. That month in the Netherlands, the AI-generated far-right anti-immigrant protest song "Wij zeggen nee, nee, nee, tegen een AZC" (We say no, no, no to an asylum shelter) peaked at No. 5 on the Dutch Single Top 100.

== In science ==
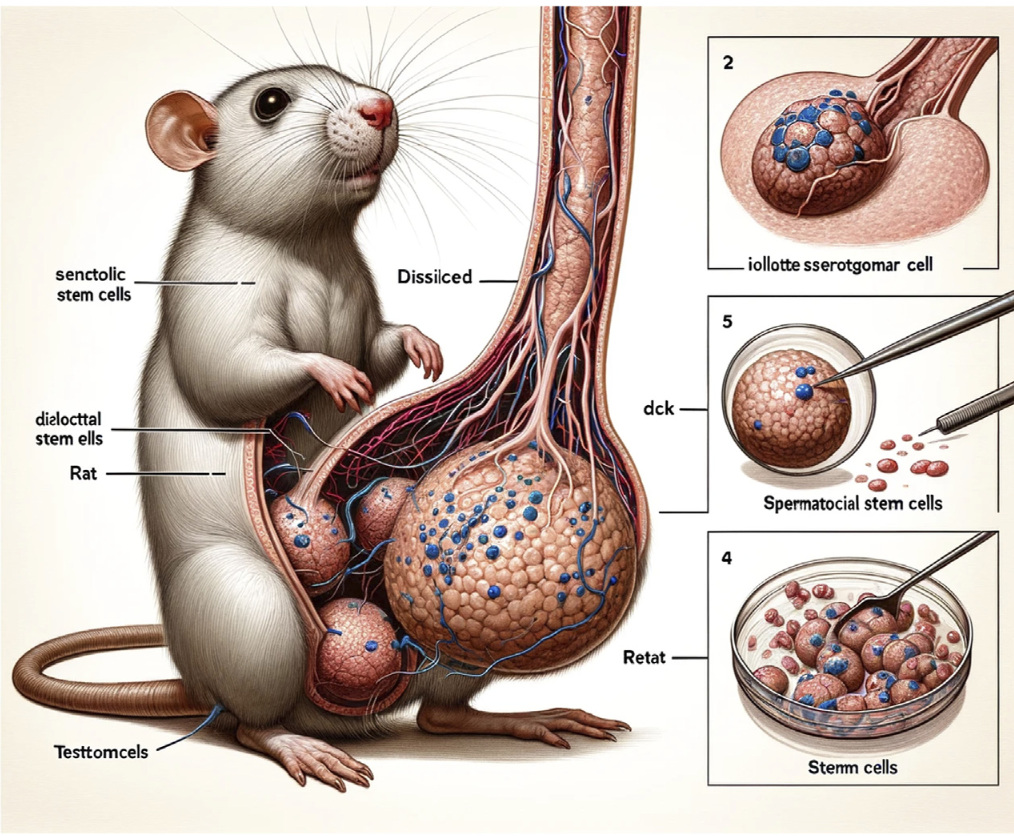
A now-retracted paper in Frontiers in Cell and Developmental Biology included this AI-generated rat with nonsensical anatomy and text.

Generative AI has been used to write articles which have been published in both low-quality research paper mills and reputable scientific journals. In 2024, an article containing a generated image of a rat with absurdly large genitals accompanied by nonsensical text and diagrams was retracted by the journal Frontiers in Cell and Developmental Biology after drawing attention from scientists on social media. Likewise, in 2025, Nature's Scientific Reports retracted the peer-reviewed article "Bridging the gap: explainable AI for autism diagnosis and parental support with TabPFNMix and SHAP" because of "an AI-generated figure" and other significant errors. David Berry has used the term scholarslop to refer to AI-generated administrative discourse in universities or quasi-academic texts. Glen Berman argues that AI-generated articles being published in scholarly journals are an "epistemic carcinogen" that will pose a major risk to the knowledge ecosystem.

== In technology ==
In January 2026, the open-source command-line utility cURL ended its bug bounty program through HackerOne after receiving a large number of false vulnerability reports. In an announcement on its official GitHub page, the project stated that rewards would no longer be offered for reported vulnerabilities. Daniel Stenberg, founder and lead developer of cURL, shared examples of fake, AI-generated bug reports submitted through the program, including one that claimed a critical vulnerability that did not actually exist. Many of these reports referenced nonexistent changelogs, included code snippets that did not match real function signatures, or were the result of simple user errors. Stenberg explained that the influx of AI-generated reports placed a significant burden on cURL's security team and that ending the program was an "attempt to reduce the noise."

== In business ==
A Harvard Business Review study, done in conjunction with Stanford University and BetterUp, found that employees were using AI tools to create low-effort "workslop" that created more work for their colleagues. Within the timeframe of the study, it was found that 40% of participating employees received some form of "workslop", with each incident taking an average of two hours to resolve. BetterUp defines workslop as "AI-generated content that looks good, but lacks substance". The study appears to be the first instance of "workslop" and also uses "workslopped" as a verb. In a subsequent study, Harvard Business Review coined the word "trendslop", referring to the "propensity for AI to opt for buzzy ideas over reasoned solutions."

In January 2026, Microsoft CEO Satya Nadella urged that people stop using the term "slop" and instead accept AI as the "new equilibrium" of human nature. The resulting public backlash was described as a Streisand effect, and the term "Microslop" rose in popularity. In March 2026, Microsoft banned the word "Microslop" on a Discord server dedicated to its Copilot AI tool, drawing further attention to the term.

== In sports ==
An AI-generated scene of Sabrina Impacciatore skating and skiing across historic host cities at the 2026 Winter Olympics opening ceremony was criticized for having replaced animators, as well as a poor depiction of the Olympic rings that violated the Olympic brand guidelines. The ice dancers Kateřina Mrázková and Daniel Mrázek were also criticized for dancing to an AI-generated song that combined AC/DC's "Thunderstruck" with the AI-composed track "One Two", imitating Bon Jovi's melody. The professional wrestling company WWE has also faced heavy criticism for their usage of AI in promotional materials including in an incident where AAA Mega Champion Dominik Mysterio was depicted wearing the championship belt of rival promotion, All Elite Wrestling.

== See also ==
- Artificial intelligence in spirituality – Belief that AI has supernatural or divine powers
- AI boom – Period of rapid progress in AI
- AI bubble – Concept asserting ongoing stock market bubble
- Brain rot – Slang for poor-quality digital content
- Clanker – Pejorative for robots and AI software
- Dead Internet theory – Concept involving online bot activity
- Elsagate – Controversy concerning a genre of YouTube videos
- Enshittification – Decline in online platform quality
- Generative AI pornography – Explicit material produced by generative AI
- Generative engine optimization – Digital marketing technique
- Goyslop – Antisemitic internet slang term
- Hallucination (artificial intelligence) – Erroneous AI-generated content presented as true
- Low culture – Forms of popular culture with mass appeal
- Remix culture – Culture encouraging the creation of derivative works
- Search engine optimization – Practice and strategies of increasing online visibility
- Slopaganda – AI-generated content used for political manipulation
- Sludge content – Genre of split-screen video
- Uncanny valley – Hypothesis that human replicas elicit revulsion
- Your AI Slop Bores Me – Online social experiment and parody website
