= Grown-Up Christmas List =

1989 Christmas song by David Foster

Song by David Foster
- Released: 1989
- Genre: Christmas
- Composer: David Foster
- Lyricist: Linda Thompson-Jenner
- Producer: David Foster

"Grown-Up Christmas List" (sometimes titled "My Grown-Up Christmas List") is a Christmas song written by David Foster (music) and Linda Thompson-Jenner (lyrics). Originally written by Foster for the 1989 CBC Christmas program A David Foster Christmas Card, the song was recorded as a duet by David Foster and Natalie Cole. In 1990, a Cole-only version of the song appeared on David Foster's River of Love album. The song was planned to be released as a single, but only a very small number of copies were sold in a limited region. In 1992, Amy Grant recorded the first cover version of the song for her second Christmas album Home for Christmas. This was the beginning of a series of cover versions by many artists, and it has become a standard Christmas song in the 21st century.

== Amy Grant version ==
"Grown-Up Christmas List"

Single by Amy Grant

from the album Home for Christmas
- Released: 1992 (U.S.)
- Genre: Christmas
- Length: 3:44 (edit); 5:00 (album)
- Label: A&M; Word
- Songwriters: David Foster; Linda Thompson-Jenner; Amy Grant
- Producer: Brown Bannister

Amy Grant singles chronology
"Breath of Heaven (Mary's Song)" (1992)	"Grown-Up Christmas List" (1992)	"Let the Season Take Wing" (1992)

Music video
- "Grown-Up Christmas List" on YouTube

=== Lyric addition ===
Amy Grant wrote an additional verse she sings as the song's second:

As children we believe
The grandest sight to see
Was something lovely wrapped beneath the tree
But Heaven only knows
That packages and bows
Can never heal a hurting human soul

In a 2023 SiriusXM radio special for The Message channel, Grant stated she asked Foster for approval to add the lyric, and Foster was not only impressed, he offered to add Grant to the songwriting credits for the song, which she declined.

Since then, some artists have chosen to perform the song with Grant's additional lyric and some have not.

=== Music video ===
A&M Records released a music video for Grant's recording of the song, featuring an appearance by Grant's son, Matthew Chapman. The song's edited version was used in the video.

=== Track listings ===
CD single
No.	Title	Length
1.	"Grown Up Christmas List" (edit)	3:44
2.	"Grown Up Christmas List" (LP version)	5:00

=== Personnel ===
- Amy Grant – lead vocals
- Robbie Buchanan – keyboards
- Tom Hemby – guitar
- Ronn Huff – conductor
- Alan Moore – orchestration
- The London Studio Orchestra – strings
- Nat Peck – contractor

== Charts ==
The original version of Grant's single did not enter any of the Billboard charts until 2011. Since then, it has spent 30 weeks on the Christian Digital Songs chart, peaking at No. 11 in December 2017. Kelly Clarkson's version entered the Adult Contemporary chart in 2003 where it spent five weeks.

=== Weekly charts ===
Chart performance for Kelly Clarkson's version
Chart (2003)	Peak position
US Adult Contemporary (Billboard)	17

Chart performance for Amy Grant's version
Chart (2011–2020)	Peak position
US Christian Digital Song Sales (Billboard)	11

Chart performance for Luis Miguel's version
Chart (2006)	Peak position
US Latin Pop Airplay (Billboard)	31

== Other recordings ==
Year	Artist	Album
1994	David T. Clydesdale and Bobbi Page	The Sound Of Christmas
1994	Randy Brooks	A Soap Opera Christmas
1995	Bryan Duncan	Christmas Is Jesus
1996	Bill Medley	Christmas Memories
1996	Chuck Negron	Joy To The World
1996	Donna Cruz	Merry Christmas Donna
1997	Donny Osmond	Christmas At Home
1997	B.J. Thomas	Christmas Is Coming Home
1997	Sam Levine	Christmas Sax
1997	Swing Sisters	Swingin' X-Mas
1999	Natalie Cole with The London Symphony Orchestra	The Magic Of Christmas
2000	Monica featuring Plus One	Platinum Christmas
2000	David Pomeranz	The Eyes Of Christmas
2000	Helena Vondráčková	Veselé Vánoce A Šťastný Nový Rok
2000	Marianne Antonsen	Soulful Christmas Songs
2001	Barbra Streisand	Christmas Memories
2003	Michael Bublé	Let It Snow!
2003	Kelly Clarkson	American Idol: Great Holiday Classics
2004	Paulini	Amazing Grace (Songs For Christmas)
2004	Lea Salonga	The Christmas Album
2005	Rene Froger	Pure Christmas
2005	Jane Monheit	The Season
2006	The Manhattan Transfer	An Acapella Christmas
2006	Christian Ingebrigtsen	Paint Christmas White
2006	David Friesen and Jeannie Hoffman	Christmas At Woodstock
2006	Stan Whitmire	Christmas Around The Piano
2006	Thierry Condor and Miriam Dee	A Christmas Eve in L.A.
2006	Luis Miguel	Navidades
2007	Boney James	Christmas Present
2007	Silvie Paladino	Christmas List
2008	Aretha Franklin	This Christmas Aretha
2008	Rissi Palmer	single only
2008	Darja Švajger	Moji Obrazi
2008	Lani Misalucha	The Gift Of Christmas
2008	Sanna, Shirley, Sonja	Our Christmas
2009	Magnus Carlsson	Christmas
2009	Rodney Carrington	Make It Christmas
2009	Anthony Evans	What Christmas Means
2009	Eric Alexander	Revival Of The Fittest
2009	Mark Vincent	My Dream, Mio Visione
2010	Joe	Home Is The Essence Of Christmas
2010	Charice	Grown-Up Christmas List
2010	The Isaacs	Christmas
2010	Trijntje Oosterhuis	This Is The Season
2010	Crystal Lewis	Home For The Holidays
2010	Evelyn Escalera	A Traditional Freestyle Christmas, Vol. 1
2011	Kathy Troccoli	Christmas Songs
2011	Los Angeles, The Voices	A Christmas Spectacular
2011	Jeffrey Biegel	A Steinway Christmas Album
2011	Richard Poon	Christmas With Richard Poon
2012	Ailee	Hitman Project #1: A Tribute To the hitman David Foster
2012	Ali Lohan	Christmas With Ali Lohan
2012	Halie Loren and Matt Treder	Many Times, Many Ways
2013
2013	Anthem Lights	Simple Little Christmas
2013	Lauren Alaina	single only
2013	Paul Carrack With The SWR Big Band	Swinging Christmas - Live
2013	Glennis Grace	One Christmas Night Only
2013	Nohelani Cypriano	Blue Hawaiian Christmas
2014	Dave Koz & Friends	The 25th Of December
2014	Sandi Patty	Christmas Blessings
2016	Jordan Smith	'Tis The Season
2016	Peter and Evynne Hollens	A Hollens Family Christmas
2017	Patti LaBelle	Home For The Holidays
2017	Fabrizio Bosso Quartet	Merry Christmas Baby
2017	The Veronicas	The Spirit Of Christmas 2017
2017	Lucie Bílá	Bílé Vánoce Lucie Bílé II.
2018	Pentatonix	Christmas Is Here!
2018	Bonnie Anderson	The Spirit Of Christmas 2018
2018	Jess Moskaluke	A Small Town Christmas
2018	Taeyeon	The Magic of Christmas Time (DVD)
2018	Nils Jiptner	Christmas Everyday
2019	John Barrowman	A Fabulous Christmas
2020	Delta Goodrem	Only Santa Knows
2020	Mark Seibert	The Christmas Album
2020	Simone Kopmajer	Christmas
2020	Ulrikke	Spend Christmas with Me
2021	Cain	Wonderful
2022	David Foster and Katharine McPhee	Christmas Songs
2023	PelleK	Christmas by the Fjords
2024	Gabby Barrett	Carols and Candlelight
2025	No Angels	It's Christmas
