= It's the Most Terrible Time of the Year =

2025 AI advert for McDonald's

- The advertisement (with audio removed for copyright reasons)
- Agency: TBWA\Neboko
- Client: McDonald's Netherlands
- Market: Netherlands
- Language: English
- Media: Television
- Running time: 45s
- Release date: 6 December 2025
- Production company: The Sweetshop

It's the Most Terrible Time of the Year is an AI-generated television commercial created for McDonald's Netherlands by TBWA\Neboko and The Sweetshop. It was released on 6 December 2025 before being pulled four days later due to negative reception over its use of generative artificial intelligence and its cynical, negative depiction of the holiday season.

== Plot ==
It's the Most Terrible Time of the Year
- Entry of the advertisement in AdForum including the video. (TVC 40s)

On a bleak, snowy day during the Christmas season, people across the city endure a series of mishaps and frustrations. Families struggle with huge loads of presents, Santa Claus is caught in traffic, and a Christmas tree "redecorates" a man's home, sending him through a window. Elsewhere, a family contends with irritating relatives and a burnt Christmas dinner. Amid the mounting chaos, one man seeks refuge in a McDonald's outlet. A Christmas choir concludes its rendition of the jingle "It's the Most Terrible Time of the Year" by urging people to "hide out in McDonald's till January's here".

== Campaign ==
It's the Most Terrible Time of the Year is a 45-second television commercial made by Dutch agency TBWA\Neboko with involvement of United States-based film production studio The Sweetshop. The advertisement was produced heavily with generative artificial intelligence (AI) following the trend set by other brands such as Coca-Cola and Toys "R" Us.

McDonald's Netherlands, the client, released a statement that the commercial was meant to depict "the stressful moments during the holidays in the Netherlands". The commercial also used Andy Williams's "It's the Most Wonderful Time of the Year" with lyrics changed to fit with the concept of the advertisement.

According to The Sweetshop, the production of the advertisement took "seven weeks". It also added that much effort was put into the commercial compared to the traditional process. Ten people of its in-house AI unit The Gardening Club worked on the project. Los Angeles-based directors Mark Potoka and Matt Spicer were initially credited to be involved in the film but they resigned due to being sidelined from the production process.

== Reception ==
The advertisement was released on McDonald's Netherlands' YouTube channel on 6 December 2025. It had an overwhelmingly negative reception over the use of generative AI and the "cynical" concept of the work's story. The video was made private on 9 December 2025.

The Sweetshop stated that the production of the advertisement took human effort. McDonald's Netherlands, while stating the original intent of the commercial, released a statement after its pullout that, for many of its customers, the holiday season is the "most wonderful time of the year".

== See also ==
- Artificial intelligence controversies
