= Treder =

Treder is a surname. Notable people with the surname include:

- Hans-Jürgen Treder (1928–2006), German theoretical physicist
- Jerzy Treder (1942–2015), Polish philologist and linguist, known as an expert in Kashubian studies
- Matt Treder, American pianist, arranger, and composer
