= Let the Season Take Wing =

Single by Amy Grant
- Released: 1992
- Recorded: 1992
- Genre: Christmas music, CCM, Adult Contemporary, Pop
- Length: 3:52
- Label: A&M
- Songwriter(s): Robert E. Irving and Kevin Quinn
- Producer(s): Brown Bannister

Amy Grant singles chronology
"Grown-Up Christmas List" (1992)	"Let the Season Take Wing" (1992)	"We Believe in God" (1993)

"Let the Season Take Wing" is a 1992 Christmas music single by Christian music/pop music singer-songwriter Amy Grant. The single was released only on cassette tape and was sold exclusively in Target stores during the 1992 Christmas season. The single was available free with any purchase of Grant's 1992 Home for Christmas album.

The song is similar in style and sound to the other original compositions on Home for Christmas and is considered by some to be a "thirteenth track" of sorts for that album. The album artwork for the single appears to be from the same photo session as that for the Christmas album. Though the song was released as a single, A&M Records did not turn much attention to promoting the song, as it was a Target exclusive. Target promoted the song instead. This song was written by Robert E. Irving and Kevin Quinn and produced by Brown Bannister. There is no music video made for the song.

Grant worked as a spokesperson for Target on various promotional campaigns and charity projects during the 1980s, 1990s, and early 2000s. She frequently contributes to the Target House charity. Grant's involvement with Target met some controversy when some in her Christian music fan base disapproved of Target's association with Planned Parenthood.

Grant had previously recorded a song titled "Love Makes You Real" for a 1989 Target Christmas television commercial. However, that song was never made available for retail, in Target stores or elsewhere. Grant would later release Target-exclusive singles to promote her 1997 album, Behind the Eyes. Likewise, she released a Target-exclusive edition of her 1999 holiday album, A Christmas to Remember, which included a bonus track: Grant's cover of "Merry Christmas, Darling".

"Let the Season Take Wing" has never been released on the CD format. When the single was released, Grant owned a great deal of her own songs (a rarity in the modern music industry) but was simultaneously represented by two record labels (another rarity in the industry). A&M Records distributed her music to mainstream pop radio and retailers, while Word Records distributed her music to Christian radio and retailers. In 2007, Grant left both labels and took all of the music that she owns herself, as well as most of the music still owned by either A&M or Word, to EMI Records. EMI took the opportunity presented by their new record deal with Amy Grant to issue new, digitally remastered editions of the artist's albums and new compilations of her hit songs.

It is not clear whether EMI now owns "Let the Season Take Wing" or whether the song remains the property of either A&M Records or Amy Grant herself. In September 2008, EMI released a new Amy Grant holiday compilation entitled The Christmas Collection. EMI issued a preliminary track listing for that release in July 2008 but noted that it was not final, leading to speculation and a fan campaign directed at "Let the Season Take Wing" appearing in remastered form on the compilation. The final album released by EMI, however, did not contain the song.

In 2019, the song was included on the limited edition vinyl box set of Grant's first three Christmas albums (A Christmas Album, Home for Christmas and A Christmas to Remember).

== Official versions ==
=== Audio versions ===
- Original cassette single version (3:52)
