= On This Day... 1776 =

Web series

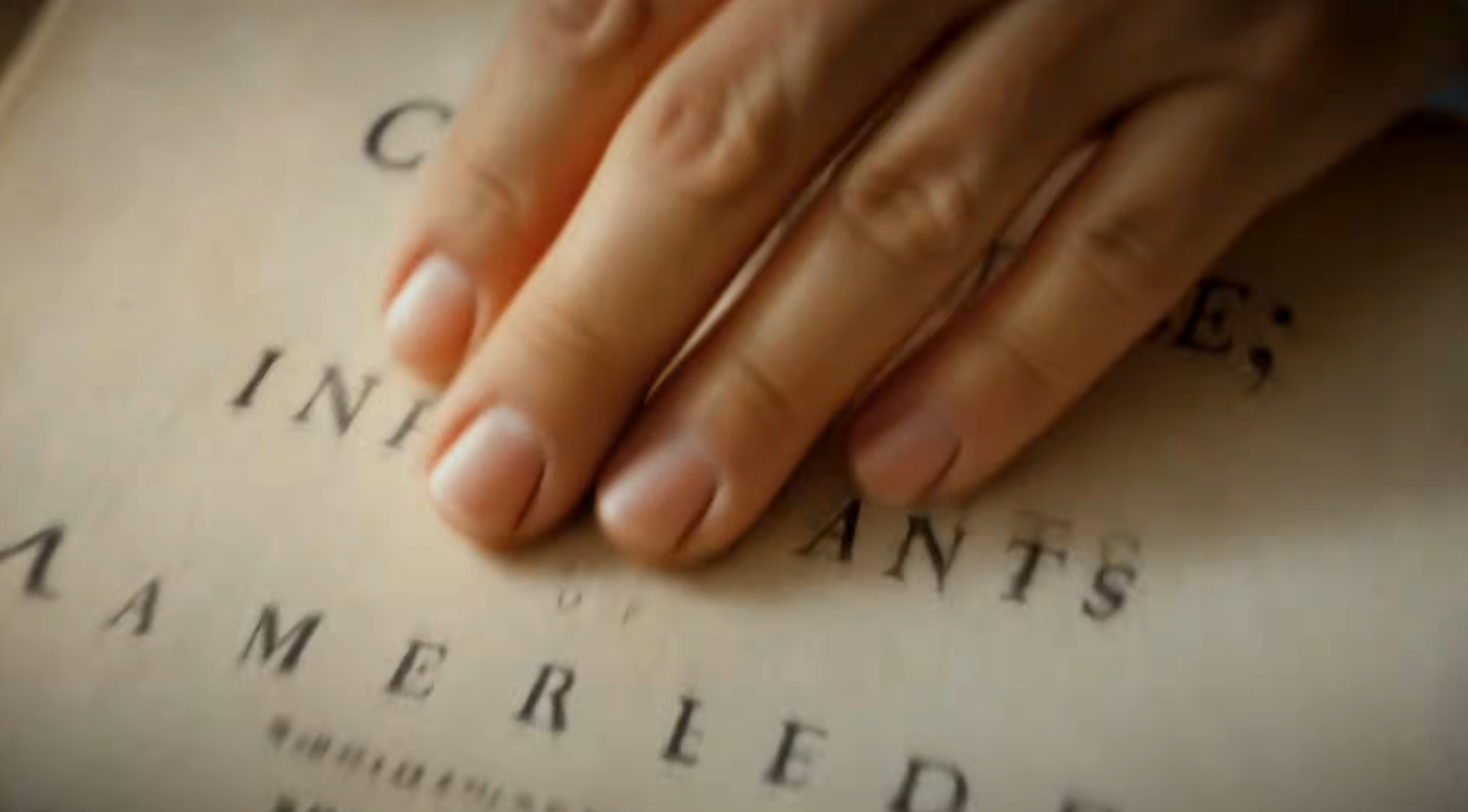
A still from the trailer showing garbled text on Thomas Paine's pamphlet, reading "AMEREED" instead of "America"

On This Day... 1776 is a web series produced by Darren Aronofsky and published on YouTube. The episodes revolve around various moments that preceded the American Revolution. The visuals were AI-generated with Google DeepMind, a text-to-video model. The series employed unionized SAG-AFTRA voice actors.

== Reception ==
On This Day... 1776 was widely panned by critics, many of whom called it "slop". Deadline said the backlash suggested that the series is "still somewhat ahead of its time" and that Aronofsky "could end up being remembered as a pioneer, rather than a pariah, in the field".
