= Fruit Love Island =

AI-generated web series

- Still frame of Fruit Love Island episode 1
- Genre: Drama
- Based on: Love Island by ITV Studios
- Original language: English
- No. of seasons: 2
- No. of episodes: 28

Production
- Running time: 2–4 minutes
- Production company: ai.cinema021

Original release
- Network: TikTok
- Release: March 13 – March 28, 2026

Fruit Love Island is an AI-generated microdrama web series published on TikTok and YouTube. It uses a mobile-first, vertical video format. The series combines various types of generative AI, including those for visuals, voice-overs, and script generation. It launched on March 13, 2026, and amassed more than 3 million followers in nine days, with more than 300 million total views. The episodes averaged over 10 million views. The series' creator, known anonymously as the TikTok account @ai.cinema021, halted production of new episodes on March 28, 2026.

== Format ==
Episode 1 of Fruit Love Island

The series follows anthropomorphized fruits participating in a dating reality show similar to Love Island. The contestants reside together at a villa on the island, as they do in the original series; Fruit Love Island also likewise challenges contestants against one another in various activities.

The series featured one multi-part special event, entitled "Casa Amor", a parody of Love Island's special event of the same name. The series also featured events that allowed the audience to vote on outcomes, such as deciding which of the proposed new contestants should join the villa. The vote usually took place in a Google Form.

== Reception ==
Fruit Love Island was subject to widespread criticism despite its rapid growth. The series has been described as "the perfect example of AI slop".

Amaya Espinal, winner of Love Island USA season 7, stated that she would "never watch it" and that the characters were "her enemy". Two contestants from Love Island USA season 6, however, JaNa Craig and Kaylor Martin, appeared to enjoy the AI-generated spin-off. Some other celebrities, like Joe Jonas and Zara Larsson, expressed their interest in the series via TikTok posts. Jonas wrote in a comment that he was "worried about watermelina" and Larsson wrote "sorry I can't hang out today, I gotta see what's happening with choclatina and strawberto". Larsson's post was deleted following widespread negative reactions from her followers.

The creator is known anonymously as "ai.cinema021" or "AI Cinema", and their true identity remains unconfirmed. Several online personalities have claimed that they originally created the series.

Towards the end of the series, TikTok began removing episodes from its platform, after which the creator pledged to continue the series on YouTube. The series ended on March 28, 2026, when ai.cinema021 posted a series of rants on their TikTok story.

== See also ==
- List of Internet phenomena
