= It's the Most Wonderful Time of the Year =

- Sheet music cover

Single by Andy Williams

from the album The Andy Williams Christmas Album
- B-side: "The Christmas Song"
- Released: October 14, 1963
- Genre: Christmas
- Length: 2:31
- Label: Columbia
- Songwriters: Edward Pola; George Wyle
- Producer: Robert Mersey

"It's the Most Wonderful Time of the Year" is a popular Christmas song written in 1963 by Edward Pola and George Wyle. It was recorded and released that year by pop singer Andy Williams for his first Christmas album, The Andy Williams Christmas Album. However, the song was not released as a promotional single by Williams' record label (Columbia Records) that year, as they instead opted to promote his cover of "White Christmas" as the official promo single from the album, and was instead released as a single in the UK in 2007. "It's the Most Wonderful Time of the Year" has consistently made it onto pop singles charts around the world in the 2010s and 2020s. It peaked at No. 5 on the US Billboard Hot 100 singles chart in 2020 and at No. 9 on the UK Singles Chart in 2021.

== History ==
=== Song content ===
The song is a celebration and description of activities associated with the Christmas season, focusing primarily on get-togethers between friends and families. Among the activities included in the song is the telling of "scary ghost stories," a Victorian Christmas tradition that has mostly fallen into disuse, but survives in the seasonal popularity of numerous adaptations of Charles Dickens' A Christmas Carol. Other activities mentioned include hosting parties, spontaneous visits from friends, universal social gaiety, spending time with loved ones, sledding for children, roasting marshmallows, sharing stories about previous Christmases, and singing Christmas carols in winter weather.

In a 2005 interview, Williams discusses how The Andy Williams Show figured into his recording of the song, first introduced in the 1962 Christmas episode:

George Wyle, who is a vocal director, who wrote all of the choir stuff and all of the duets and trios and things that I did with all the guests, he wrote a song just for the show – I think the second Christmas show we did – called 'Most Wonderful Time of the Year'. So I did that, you know, every Christmas, and then other people started doing it. And then suddenly it's become – not suddenly but over 30 years – it's become a big standard. I think it's one of the top 10 Christmas songs of all time now.

Although Williams occasionally rerecorded the song, the original 1963 version remains the most popular and well-known.

The song was selected as the theme song for Christmas Seals in 1968, 1976, 2009 and 2012.

== Other notable versions ==
- 1986: Johnny Mathis, for his album Christmas Eve with Johnny Mathis. This recording later made both the Billboard Holiday 100 and Holiday Airplay charts during the 2000s and 2010s.
- 1999: Garth Brooks, for his album Garth Brooks and the Magic of Christmas. Brooks also became the first artist to chart a version of the song in North America, as his remake peaked at No. 56 on the Billboard Hot Country Singles & Tracks chart on the week ending January 8, 2000.
- 2003/2004: Andy Williams, in a shorter, more upbeat version for the 2004 film Surviving Christmas.
- 2008: Harry Connick Jr., for his album What a Night! A Christmas Album. This recording peaked at No. 9 on the Billboard Adult Contemporary chart on the week ending December 20, 2008.
- 2008: BarlowGirl, for their album, Home for Christmas. This recording peaked at No. 21 on the Billboard Hot Christian Songs chart and at No. 25 on the Billboard Christian AC Songs charts (both on the week ending January 3, 2009).
- 2020: Stevie Mackey, Jennifer Lopez and The Eleven for Mackey's album, The Most Wonderful Time. This recording peaked at No. 24 on the Billboard Adult Contemporary chart on the week ending December 19, 2021.

== Use in advertising and parodies ==
Since 1994, the song was used humorously in the Staples office supply retail chain's annual back to school advertising campaign. In the commercials, the parents joyously shop for school supplies to this song in anticipation of the upcoming school year while their children sullenly follow.

The UK travel retailer On the Beach has used the song in its advertising since 2021.

The song is a favorite of radio stations that broadcast Christmas music as a "first song" marking the flip to its original format; in 2024, among a sample of 20 stations that changed early (before Veterans Day), five of those stations chose the song (four used the original, while a fifth chose the Johnny Mathis cover version), tied for the most with Mariah Carey's "All I Want for Christmas Is You."

The song was used in the McDonald's Netherlands 2025 AI-generated commercial It's the Most Terrible Time of the Year. The advertisement was pulled out due to negative reception.

== Chart performance ==
In the issue of Billboard magazine dated November 28, 2009, the list of the "Top 10 Holiday Songs (Since 2001)" places the Williams recording of "It's the Most Wonderful Time of the Year" at number five. 2001 also marked the first year in which the American Society of Composers, Authors and Publishers (ASCAP) started compiling data regarding the radio airplay of holiday songs, and although the Williams classic started out at number 25 of twenty-five songs that were ranked that year, it gained steam over the next ten years, reaching number 18 in 2002, number 13 in 2003, and eventually getting to number four in 2010.

Because of its use in an advertisement for Marks & Spencer, a CD single of the Williams recording was released in the UK in 2007 and gave the song its first of many annual appearances on the UK singles chart. In December 2011, Billboard returned to the practice of publishing a seasonal Christmas singles chart, and the Williams song debuted at number eight on the newly christened Holiday 100, where it has reappeared every year since. In December 2016, Williams' original version began a series of annual chart runs on the Billboard Hot 100, reaching the top 10 for the first time in December 2018. On the Hot 100 chart from the 2020 holiday season dated January 2, 2021, it reached an all-time peak position of No. 5.

=== Weekly charts ===
==== Andy Williams version ====
Weekly chart performance for "It's the Most Wonderful Time of the Year" by Andy Williams (2007)
Chart (2007)	Peak position
UK (Official Charts Company)	21

Weekly chart performance (2008)
Chart (2008)	Peak position
UK (Official Charts Company)	63

Weekly chart performance (2009)
Chart (2009)	Peak position
UK (Official Charts Company)	85

Weekly chart performance (2011)
Chart (2011)	Peak position
US Holiday 100 (Billboard)	8

Weekly chart performance (2012)
Chart (2012)	Peak position
Sweden (Sverigetopplistan)	42
US Holiday 100 (Billboard)	6

Weekly chart performance (2013)
Chart (2013)	Peak position
Netherlands (Single Top 100)	71
Sweden (Sverigetopplistan)	33
UK (Official Charts Company)	90
US Holiday 100 (Billboard)	7

Weekly chart performance (2014)
Chart (2014)	Peak position
Hungary (Stream Top 40)	35
Ireland (IRMA)	75
Netherlands (Single Top 100)	69
Sweden (Sverigetopplistan)	51
UK (Official Charts Company)	61
US Holiday 100 (Billboard)	10

Weekly chart performance (2015)
Chart (2015)	Peak position
Ireland (IRMA)	65
Netherlands (Single Top 100)	36
Sweden (Sverigetopplistan)	57
UK (Official Charts Company)	61
US Holiday 100 (Billboard)	12

Weekly chart performance (2016)
Chart (2016)	Peak position
Canadian Hot 100 (Billboard)	43
Germany (Offiziele Deutsche Charts)	86
Hungary (Stream Top 40)	35
Ireland (IRMA)	29
Netherlands (Single Top 100)	20
Portugal (AFP)	85
Sweden (Sverigetopplistan)	31
Switzerland (Schweizer Hitparade)	68
UK (Official Charts Company)	24
US Holiday 100 (Billboard)	5
US Billboard Hot 100	48

Weekly chart performance (2017)
Chart (2017)	Peak position
Czech Republic (Singles Digitál Top 100)	17
Germany (Offiziele Deutsche Charts)	92
Hungary (Stream Top 40)	9
Ireland (IRMA)	25
Latvia Streaming (DigiTop100)	41
Netherlands (Single Top 100)	40
Slovakia (Singles Digitál Top 100)	24
Sweden (Sverigetopplistan)	21
Switzerland (Schweizer Hitparade)	91
UK (Official Charts Company)	17
US Holiday 100 (Billboard)	3
US Billboard Hot 100	32

Weekly chart performance (2018)
Chart (2018)	Peak position
Austria (Ö3 Austria Top 40)	46
Canadian Hot 100 (Billboard)	21
Czech Republic (Singles Digitál Top 100)	10
Denmark (Tracklisten)	36
Estonia (Eesti Tipp-40)	26
France (SNEP)	186
Germany (Offiziele Deutsche Charts)	42
Greece International (IFPI)	13
Hungary (Stream Top 40)	7
Ireland (IRMA)	21
Italy (FIMI)	94
Latvia Streaming (DigiTop100)	12
Netherlands (Single Top 100)	10
New Zealand (Recorded Music NZ)	14
Portugal (AFP)	23
Slovakia (Singles Digitál Top 100)	5
Spain (PROMUSICAE)	78
Sweden (Sverigetopplistan)	19
Switzerland (Schweizer Hitparade)	28
UK (Official Charts Company)	29
US Holiday 100 (Billboard)	2
US Billboard Hot 100	10

Weekly chart performance (2019)
Chart (2019)	Peak position
Australia (ARIA)	16
Austria (Ö3 Austria Top 40)	44
Canadian Hot 100 (Billboard)	13
Czech Republic (Singles Digitál Top 100)	34
Denmark (Tracklisten)	31
France (SNEP)	87
Germany (Offiziele Deutsche Charts)	42
Greece International (IFPI)	21
Hungary (Stream Top 40)	6
Ireland (IRMA)	18
Italy (FIMI)	81
Latvia Streaming (LaIPA)	6
Netherlands (Single Top 100)	9
New Zealand (Recorded Music NZ)	14
Portugal (AFP)	37
Slovakia (Singles Digitál Top 100)	22
Spain (PROMUSICAE)	95
Sweden (Sverigetopplistan)	24
Switzerland (Schweizer Hitparade)	13
UK (Official Charts Company)	25
US Holiday 100 (Billboard)	5
US Billboard Hot 100	7
US Rolling Stone Top 100	6

Weekly chart performance (2020)
Chart (2020)	Peak position
Austria (Ö3 Austria Top 40)	25
Canadian Hot 100 (Billboard)	7
Czech Republic (Singles Digitál Top 100)	23
Denmark (Tracklisten)	27
France (SNEP)	76
Germany (Offiziele Deutsche Charts)	22
Global 200 (Billboard)	7
Greece International (IFPI)	7
Hungary (Single Top 40)	39
Ireland (IRMA)	16
Italy (FIMI)	48
Netherlands (Single Top 100)	5
Norway (VG-lista)	22
Portugal (AFP)	13
Slovakia (Singles Digitál Top 100)	8
Sweden (Sverigetopplistan)	15
Switzerland (Schweizer Hitparade)	19
UK (Official Charts Company)	23
US Holiday 100 (Billboard)	4
US Billboard Hot 100	5
US Rolling Stone Top 100	4

Weekly chart performance (2021)
Chart (2021)	Peak position
Austria (Ö3 Austria Top 40)	35
Canadian Hot 100 (Billboard)	10
Czech Republic (Singles Digitál Top 100)	37
Denmark (Tracklisten)	38
Finland (Suomen virallinen lista)	18
Germany (Offiziele Deutsche Charts)	37
Global 200 (Billboard)	8
Greece International (IFPI)	9
Ireland (IRMA)	10
Italy (FIMI)	28
Lithuania (AGATA)	8
Netherlands (Single Top 100)	6
New Zealand (Recorded Music NZ)	28
Norway (VG-lista)	33
Portugal (AFP)	25
Slovakia (Singles Digitál Top 100)	37
South Africa (RISA)	60
Sweden (Sverigetopplistan)	18
Switzerland (Schweizer Hitparade)	11
UK (Official Charts Company)	9
US Holiday 100 (Billboard)	5
US Billboard Hot 100	6

Weekly chart performance (2022)
Chart (2022)	Peak position
Australia (ARIA)	8
Austria (Ö3 Austria Top 40)	22
Belgium (Ultratop 50 Flanders)	17
Belgium (Ultratop 50 Wallonia)	14
Canadian Hot 100 (Billboard)	7
Czech Republic (Singles Digitál Top 100)	29
Denmark (Tracklisten)	24
Finland (Suomen virallinen lista)	17
France (SNEP)	37
Germany (Offiziele Deutsche Charts)	24
Global 200 (Billboard)	8
Greece International (IFPI)	13
Ireland (IRMA)	9
Italy (FIMI)	21
Lithuania (AGATA)	9
Luxembourg (Billboard)	7
Netherlands (Single Top 100)	8
New Zealand (Recorded Music NZ)	13
Norway (VG-lista)	23
Portugal (AFP)	17
Slovakia (Singles Digitál Top 100)	10
Spain (PROMUSICAE)	59
Sweden (Sverigetopplistan)	9
Switzerland (Schweizer Hitparade)	11
UK (Official Charts Company)	10
US Holiday 100 (Billboard)	5
US Billboard Hot 100	6

Weekly chart performance (2023)
Chart (2023)	Peak position
Australia (ARIA)	8
Austria (Ö3 Austria Top 40)	23
Belgium (Ultratop 50 Flanders)	8
Belgium (Ultratop 50 Wallonia)	9
Canadian Hot 100 (Billboard)	6
Croatia (Billboard)	20
Czech Republic (Singles Digitál Top 100)	17
Denmark (Tracklisten)	18
Finland (Suomen virallinen lista)	28
France (SNEP)	10
Germany (Offiziele Deutsche Charts)	26
Global 200 (Billboard)	7
Greece International (IFPI)	8
Hungary (Single Top 40)	12
Iceland (Tónlistinn)	17
Ireland (IRMA)	12
Italy (FIMI)	11
Latvia Streaming (LaIPA)	7
Lithuania (AGATA)	10
Luxembourg (Billboard)	8
Netherlands (Single Top 100)	6
New Zealand (Recorded Music NZ)	8
Norway (VG-lista)	14
Poland (Polish Airplay Top 100)	65
Poland (Polish Streaming Top 100)	13
Portugal (AFP)	15
Singapore (RIAS)	29
Slovakia (Singles Digitál Top 100)	11
Spain (PROMUSICAE)	47
Sweden (Sverigetopplistan)	12
Switzerland (Schweizer Hitparade)	12
United Arab Emirates (IFPI)	17
UK (Official Charts Company)	9
US Holiday 100 (Billboard)	6
US Billboard Hot 100	6

Weekly chart performance (2024)
Chart (2024)	Peak position
Australia (ARIA)	10
Austria (Ö3 Austria Top 40)	26
Belgium (Ultratop 50 Flanders)	48
Belgium (Ultratop 50 Wallonia)	39
Canadian Hot 100 (Billboard)	5
Czech Republic (Singles Digitál Top 100)	63
Denmark (Tracklisten)	25
Estonia Airplay (TopHit)	13
Finland (Suomen virallinen lista)	21
France (SNEP)	14
Germany (Offiziele Deutsche Charts)	34
Global 200 (Billboard)	12
Greece International (IFPI)	15
Hungary (Single Top 40)	18
Iceland (Tónlistinn)	25
Ireland (IRMA)	13
Italy (FIMI)	6
Lithuania (AGATA)	11
Luxembourg (Billboard)	10
Netherlands (Single Top 100)	4
New Zealand (Recorded Music NZ)	9
Norway (VG-lista)	22
Poland (Polish Airplay Top 100)	39
Poland (Polish Streaming Top 100)	18
Portugal (AFP)	118
Slovakia (Singles Digitál Top 100)	21
Spain (PROMUSICAE)	32
Sweden (Sverigetopplistan)	10
Switzerland (Schweizer Hitparade)	14
UK (Official Charts Company)	11
US Holiday 100 (Billboard)	6
US Billboard Hot 100	7

Weekly chart performance (2025)
Chart (2025)	Peak position
Austria (Ö3 Austria Top 40)	27
Belgium (Ultratop 50 Flanders)	40
Belgium (Ultratop 50 Wallonia)	42
Canadian Hot 100 (Billboard)	8
Czech Republic (Singles Digitál Top 100)	54
Denmark (Tracklisten)	26
Finland (Suomen virallinen lista)	23
France (SNEP)	13
Germany (Offiziele Deutsche Charts)	37
Global 200 (Billboard)	10
Greece International (IFPI)	12
Hungary (Single Top 40)	27
Iceland (Tónlistinn)	22
Ireland (IRMA)	15
Italy (FIMI)	15
Latvia Streaming (LaIPA)	9
Lithuania (AGATA)	9
Luxembourg (Billboard)	11
Netherlands (Single Top 100)	7
New Zealand (Recorded Music NZ)	9
Norway (VG-lista)	27
Poland (Polish Airplay Top 100)	72
Poland (Polish Streaming Top 100)	24
Portugal (AFP)	13
Russia Streaming (TopHit)	58
Slovakia (Singles Digitál Top 100)	31
Spain (PROMUSICAE)	42
Switzerland (Schweizer Hitparade)	15
UK (Official Charts Company)	14
US Holiday 100 (Billboard)	6
US Billboard Hot 100	9

=== Year-end charts ===
Year-end chart performance
Chart (2022)	Position
US Streaming Songs (Billboard)	69

Chart (2023)	Position
Hungary (Single Top 40)	65
US Streaming Songs (Billboard)	59

== Certifications ==
Region	Certification	Certified units/sales
Australia (ARIA)	2× Platinum	140,000^{‡}
Denmark (IFPI Danmark)	2× Platinum	180,000^{‡}
Germany (BVMI)	Gold	300,000^{‡}
Italy (FIMI)	Platinum	100,000^{‡}
New Zealand (RMNZ)	Platinum	30,000^{‡}
Portugal (AFP)	Platinum	10,000^{‡}
Spain (Promusicae)	Gold	25,000^{‡}
United Kingdom (BPI)	3× Platinum	1,800,000^{‡}
Streaming
Greece (IFPI Greece)	Platinum	2,000,000^{†}
^{‡} Sales+streaming figures based on certification alone.^{†} Streaming-only figures based on certification alone.
