= Home for Christmas (Amy Grant album) =

Studio album by Amy Grant
- Released: October 6, 1992
- Recorded: September 1992
- Studios: Javelina Studios, RCA Studios, OmniSound Studios, The Dugout and Quad Studios (Nashville, Tennessee); Tejas Recorders (Franklin, Tennessee); Record One (Sherman Oaks, California); Ocean Way Recording (Hollywood, California); Hip Pocket Studios and The Hit Factory (New York City, New York); CTS Studios (London, UK)
- Genres: Christmas music; pop
- Length: 42:31
- Label: A&M
- Producers: Brown Bannister; Ronn Huff

Amy Grant chronology
| Heart in Motion (1991) | Home for Christmas (1992) | House of Love (1994) |

Singles from Home for Christmas
- 1. "Breath of Heaven (Mary's Song)" Released: 1992; 2. "Grown-Up Christmas List" Released: 1992 (US)

Professional ratings
Review scores
| Source | Rating |
|---|---|
| AllMusic | 4.5/5 stars |

Home for Christmas is the tenth studio album by Christian music and pop music singer Amy Grant, released on October 6, 1992. It is Grant's second holiday album, the first being 1983's A Christmas Album.

== Commercial performance ==
Coming off the heels of Grant's successful 1991 album, Heart in Motion, Home for Christmas performed even better than Heart in Motion on the Billboard charts, reaching No. 2 on the Billboard 200 and No. 1 on the Christian album chart. It was later reissued in 2003 as 20th Century Masters – The Christmas Collection: The Best of Amy Grant.

On November 17, 1997, Home for Christmas was certified Triple Platinum by the Recording Industry Association of America for shipment of three million copies in the United States.

As of November 2014, Home for Christmas is the eighteenth best-selling Christmas/holiday album in the U.S. during the Nielsen SoundScan era of music sales tracking (March 1991 – present), having sold 2,540,000 copies according to SoundScan.

In 2021, Billboard named Home for Christmas the 24th Greatest Holiday Album of All Time.

== Track listing ==
| No. | Title | Writer(s) | Length |
|---|---|---|---|
| 1. | "Have Yourself a Merry Little Christmas" | Ralph Blane, Hugh Martin | 2:36 |
| 2. | "It's the Most Wonderful Time of the Year" | Edward Pola, George Wyle | 2:26 |
| 3. | "Joy to the World/For Unto Us a Child Is Born" | George Frideric Handel, Isaac Watts | 2:33 |
| 4. | "Breath of Heaven (Mary's Song)" | Amy Grant, Chris Eaton | 5:29 |
| 5. | "O Come All Ye Faithful" | John Francis Wade | 3:01 |
| 6. | "Grown-Up Christmas List" | David Foster, Linda Thompson, additional lyrics by Amy Grant | 5:00 |
| 7. | "Rockin' Around the Christmas Tree" | Johnny Marks | 2:07 |
| 8. | "Winter Wonderland" | Felix Bernard, Dick Smith | 2:17 |
| 9. | "I'll Be Home for Christmas" | Kim Gannon, Walter Kent, Buck Ram | 3:27 |
| 10. | "The Night Before Christmas" | Carly Simon | 3:52 |
| 11. | "Emmanuel, God With Us" | Grant, Eaton, Robert Marshall | 4:56 |
| 12. | "Jesu, Joy of Man's Desiring (Instrumental)" | Johann Sebastian Bach | 4:47 |

== Personnel ==
Musicians

- Amy Grant – vocals (1–11)
- Shane Keister – acoustic piano (4, 10), keyboards (8, 10, 11), track arrangements (8), string arrangements (10)
- Carl Marsh – synthesizer (4), keyboards (11, 12), orchestration (12)
- Robbie Buchanan – keyboards (6)
- Clare Fischer – acoustic piano (9)
- Blair Masters – keyboards (10, 11)
- Chris Eaton – acoustic piano (11)
- Phil Keaggy – guitars (5)
- Tom Hemby – guitar (6, 12), acoustic guitar (10)
- Jerry McPherson – guitar (7), track arrangements (7), acoustic guitar (10)
- Dann Huff – guitar (10)
- Craig Nelson – bass guitar (7, 9)
- David Hungate – bass guitar (8, 10)
- Chris McHugh – drums (7)
- Paul Leim – drums (8, 10), percussion (10)
- Harold Jones – drums (9)
- Steve Forman – percussion (7)
- Mark O'Connor – violin (12)
- The London Studio Orchestra – strings (1–3, 6, 9, 10, 12)
- Ronn Huff – orchestration (1–3, 9), conductor (1–3, 6, 9, 10, 12)
- Alan Moore – orchestration (6)
- Nat Peck – orchestra contractor (1–3, 6, 9, 10, 12)

Background vocalists

- Chris Eaton – backing vocals (2, 7), additional backing vocals (11)
- Marty McCall – backing vocals (2, 7, 10)
- Marabeth Jordan – backing vocals (2, 7, 10)
- Bonnie Keen – backing vocals (2, 7, 10)
- The American Boychoir – choir (3, 5, 11)
- James Litton – boychoir director (3, 5, 11)
- Ronn Huff – choral arrangements and conductor (3, 5, 11)
- Jessica Owen, Kristina Owen, Carrie Gardner, Lisa Pardin, Asher Larrison, Emily Estes, Bethany Wright, Skyla Carnahan, Katy Dunham and Ellie Bannister – children's choir (10)
- John Darnall – children's choir director (10)

Production

- Amy Grant – executive producer
- Michael Blanton – executive producer
- Brown Bannister – producer
- Ronn Huff – producer (2, 3)
- Bill Deaton – tracking engineer
- Michael O'Reilly – additional engineer
- Patrick Kelly – assistant engineer
- Rich Indelicato – assistant engineer
- Greg Parker – assistant engineer
- Steve Bishir – overdub engineer
- Brett Perry – overdub assistant
- Rail Rogut – overdub assistant
- Martin Woodlee – overdub assistant
- Anthony Zecco – overdub assistant
- Adrian Kerridge – orchestra sessions engineer
- James Collins – orchestra sessions assistant engineer
- Bill Schnee – mixing
- Noel Hazen – mix assistant
- Doug Sax – mastering at The Mastering Lab (Hollywood, California)
- Steve Hall – remastering at Future Disc (North Hollywood, California)
- Traci Sterling – production coordinator
- Chuck Beeson – art direction, design
- Rich Frankel – art direction
- Rebecca Chamlee – design
- Victoria Pearson Cameron – photography

== Charts ==
=== Weekly charts ===
Chart performance for Home for Christmas
| Chart (1992–2020) | Peak position |
|---|---|
| US Billboard 200 | 2 |
| US Top Christian Albums (Billboard) | 1 |
| US Top Holiday Albums (Billboard) | 1 |

=== Year-end charts ===
Year-end performance for Home for Christmas
| Chart (1993) | Position |
|---|---|
| US Billboard 200 | 58 |

== Certifications ==
Certifications for Home for Christmas
| Region | Certification | Certified units/sales |
|---|---|---|
| Canada (Music Canada) | Gold | 50,000^{^} |
| United States (RIAA) | 3× Platinum | 3,000,000^{^} |
^{^} Shipments figures based on certification alone.
