= Matt Treder =

Pianist, arranged and composer based in Eugene, Oregon

- Born: Ellensburg, Washington, U.S.
- Other names: Matthew Treder
- Occupations: Pianist, composer, arranger
- Website: http://matt-treder.com/

Matt Treder is a pianist, arranger and composer based in Eugene, Oregon, best known for his work with vocalist Halie Loren, with whom he has performed on, arranged, and co-produced five albums, including the 2009 Just Plain Folks winner for Best Vocal Jazz Album, They Oughta Write a Song. He is on faculty at The John G. Shedd Institute for the Arts and musical director at the Center for Spiritual Living Eugene.

Growing up in Ellensburg, Washington, he began composing music at an early age. At 6, he won a local talent show with an original composition. While in middle school, he composed the score for a musical adaptation of A Midsummer Night's Dream written by his father, Jeff Treder. He has played in jazz combos, toured with country bands, co-founded Eugene cult rock band ToneDawg, composed music for video games and gospel recordings, and collaborated with Dove and Grammy award-winning producer Christopher Stevens.

During his tenure as managing editor of the Cottage Grove Sentinel newspaper, he helped originate the Metropolitan Rhythm & Blues Revue, an annual fundraiser for Cottage Grove High School.

Treder served as pianist and principal arranger for the Eugene Concert Choir's 2010 spring pops concert, The British Invasion.

He performs regularly with Satin Love Orchestra and Halie Loren, and is a past member of The Essentials (2009 Register-Guard readers' choice for Best Band) and the Deb Cleveland Band (voted 2008′s best blues vocalist by Eugene Weekly readers). Other performing credits include Michael Tracey (2007 Northwest Harmonica Championship winner), rock-and-roll frontman Leon Smith, Don Latarski, Paul Biondi, Swang, Tim Clarke, the Emerald City Jazz Kings, John Gainer's Inspirational Sounds, Swing Shift, Lydia Miller, Amy Clawson, and the University of Oregon jazz, vocal jazz and gospel ensembles.
