= AdForum =

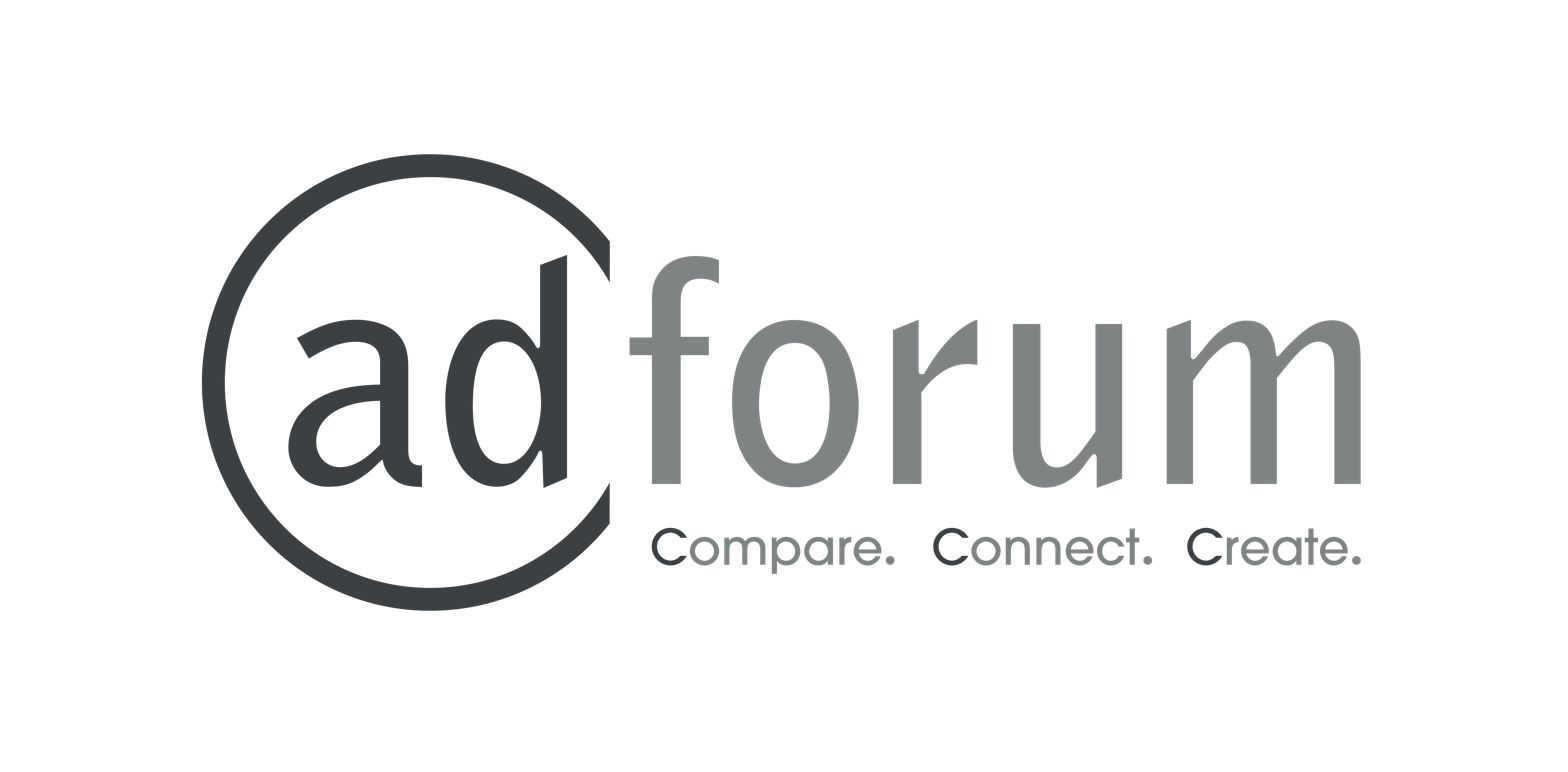
- Industry: Advertising
- Founded: 1999
- Founder: Hervé de Clerck
- Headquarters: 118 East 28th Str., Suite 501, New York, United States
- Services: Marketing
- Number of employees: 11-50
- Website: www.adforum.com

AdForum Maydream Inc. is a company founded in 1999 to provide information on the advertising industry to marketers, industry professionals and the trade press. By liaising with industry awards shows and advertising agencies, it has built up a database of Advertising Agency profiles and advertisements. According to information on the site, it currently offers access to profiles of over 20,000 agencies as well as a searchable library of more than 90,000 different ads from 110 countries. An article on the website of the French newspaper Le Figaro in 2010 cited 20,000 agencies and 100,000 campaigns.

AdForum was founded by Hervé de Clerck, a French former adman who held posts including Managing Director International of Havas Intermediation, vice president of DMB&B Inc, CEO of DMB&B France and COO of Lesieur. In 2001, de Clerck used AdForum as a springboard for launching ACT Responsible, an association that aims to recognise excellence in cause-related advertising. Apart from its website, its main platform is an annual exhibition and awards ceremony at the Cannes Lions International Festival of Creativity.

In June 2009, Kofi Annan, former Secretary General of the United Nations, President of the Global Humanitarian Forum, and David Jones, Global CEO of Havas Worldwide and co-founder of One Young World, joined a debate on climate change hosted by ACT Responsible and AdForum founder Hervé de Clerck at the 56th Cannes International Advertising Festival.

In 2000, AdForum unveiled its AdFolio service, a searchable library of advertising creative work. It was described by US trade magazine Adweek as "a brainstorming tool for creative people, a new-business generator for ad agencies and a scouting mechanism for brand managers."

AdForum.com also offers services such as a job board and a weekly "best ads" newsletter. Membership is free and members are entitled to receive the newsletter as well as news alerts relating to their specific areas of interest, such as agencies, brands or industry awards. However, access to the creative library requires a paid subscription. The site offers a number of packages, for example, US$49 for one month, $299 for one year (or $149 for students and professors), and $1799 a year for up to ten users. AdForum also earns income from paid advertising on its site. Since 2005, AdForum has held regular summits in cities such as Paris, New York, London and (in 2009) Shanghai. As noted by the French advertising trade journal Stratégies, the invitation-only event is designed to bring agency search consultants together with agency CEOs.

At its worldwide summit in New York at the end of 2011, AdForum helped create a Code of Conduct for agency search consultants, who match advertisers with agencies. According to a report by themediaonline, consultants organised their code of conduct around seven key principles that they will follow during the agency selection process: excellence, equity, responsibility, integrity, absence of conflict of interest, transparency and confidentiality.
