= BetterUp =

American digital coaching company

- Type: Private
- Industry: Professional development
- Founded: 2013; 13 years ago
- Founder: Alexi Robichaux; Eduardo Medina
- Headquarters: Austin, Texas, United States
- Key people: Alexi Robichaux (CEO); Eduardo Medina (COO)
- Products: Coaching platform, AI coaching
- Website: www.betterup.com

BetterUp is an American digital coaching and workforce development company founded in 2013. It was officially launched in 2016 and raised a total of $570 million. The company specializes in one-on-one coaching, behavioral sciences, and artificial intelligence to provide personal and professional development for individuals and companies.

== History ==
BetterUp was founded by Alexi Robichaux and Eduardo Medina in 2013. It was beta-tested by Logitech, Capital One, and Deloitte. In November 2016, it raised $12.9 million and officially launched its mobile application that connects employees with career coaches. (Note: $2.9million in seed, $10 million round A) In 2018, the company launched BetterUp Labs to collaborate with academic and scientific partners on furthering research in organizational psychology, behavioral neuroscience, and social psychology. In June 2019, BetterUp raised $103 million in a Series C round.

In 2021, after the COVID-19 pandemic created a "dotcom boom for mental health", BetterUp raised a $125 million Series D at a $1.7 billion valuation, acquired the companies Motive (detects emotions in language) and Impraise (manager productivity tool), and raised a Series E round of $300 million at a nearly $4.7 billion valuation. Prince Harry, Duke of Sussex, joined the company as Chief Impact Officer in 2021, a position he held until 2026 when he transitioned to the role of senior advisor. The company established the Center for Purpose and Performance chaired by Dr. Adam Grant to conduct behavioral research on workplace motivation. In 2023, BetterUp acquired the sleep coaching company Crescent. In August 2025, after acquiring Heyday (AI for coaches) and Practica (skills-based AI coaching), BetterUp released a pure AI coaching application.

== Description ==
BetterUp operates a subscription-based software-as-a-service (SaaS) to provide customized virtual professional coaching to individuals and enterprises. It provides one-on-one and group coaching, assessment tools, video sessions, AI-powered interventions and data-driven insights. BetterUp raised $570 million since its launch in 2013. Customers include Meta, Salesforce, Hilton, and the US Air Force.
