= Monroe Symphony Orchestra =

American orchestra

The Monroe Symphony (MSO) is a professional American orchestra located in Monroe, Louisiana. The orchestra was founded in 1971 by Richard Worthington, who served as its musical director from 1971 until 1991. John Hodges is the current music director, having just completed his first season in April of 2026. The orchestra's season consists of classical concerts, pops concerts, and an educational concert offered to local elementary school students. The MSO also holds the annual Marjorie Stricklin Emerging Artists Competition to promote and encourage excellence in musical performance, and to provide orchestral performance opportunities for youth and young adults residing in Louisiana.
