= Francesco D'Isa =

Italian artist, writer, journalist and art curator

- Born: 22 September 1980 (age 45); Florence, Italy
- Known for: Painting, digital art, literature
- Website: www.gizart.com

Francesco D'Isa (born 22 September 1980) is an Italian artist, writer, journalist and art curator.

== Art career ==
He studied philosophy in Florence, Italy. He is a self-taught artist. He is a pioneer of digital art in Italy, but his drawing abilities let him work with traditional media as well. He was the co-founder of the Italian art and literature magazine "Mostro," where he published his first artworks. After that, his digital and traditional artworks were featured in many magazines around the world, like "Expose III", Ballistic Publishing (US); "Pixel Surgeons: Extreme Manipulation of the Figure in Photography", Mitchell Beazley Art & Design, Octopus ed. (UK); "Black Magic, White Noise", "Illusive 3", Die Gestalten Verlag (Germany); "Design 360°", SanDu Culture ed. (China); GQ magazine (Italy); Inside Art (Italy). His accolades in contemporary art practice has been recognised with several art prizes. He has exhibited internationally from Italy, Germany, the Netherlands, Switzerland, England, the United States, Australia, Russia, and South America. His theory and practice have been extended as a workshop leader and lecturer in multimedia, especially in the field of AI, where he works both as an artist and a theorist. In 2007, he became "Pornpope" founding the porn-artistic collective Pornsaints. Francesco D'Isa serves as the editorial director for the cultural magazine L'Indiscreto and contributes writings and illustrations to various magazines, both in Italy and abroad. He is a professor of Illustration and Contemporary Plastic Techniques at LABA (Brescia).

== Publications ==
In 2010, his comic "I., a comic drawn by everyone" become a regular blog of the Italian online newspaper Il Post; in November 2011 "I." has been published as an illustrated book by Nottempo (Italy). In 2013, his short stories has been published in "Selezione Naturale", Effequ (Italy) and "Toscani Maledetti", Piano B (Italy) and his short comic "Liebe macht nicht frei, baby!" as ebook for Retina Comics. His first novel, "Anna - storia di un palindromo" has been published in 2014 by Effequ (Italy), his second novel, "Ultimo piano (o porno totale)", by Imprimatur (Italy) in 2015, the third "La Stanza di Therese", by Tunué (Italy) in 2017. His philosophical essay "L'assurda evidenza" was published by Tlon Editions in 2022. Most recently, he released the graphic novel "Sunyata" with Eris Edizioni in 2023, one of the first comic books created with AI published in Italy, and the essay "La rivoluzione algoritmica delle immagini" for Sossella Editore (2024).

== Bibliography ==
- "I.", (Nottetempo, 2011) ISBN 9788874523351
- "Anna - storia di un palindromo" (Effequ, 2014) ISBN 978 88 98837 083
- "Ultimo piano (o porno totale)" (Imprimatur, 2015) ISBN 978 8868302696
- "Forse non tutti sanno che a Firenze..." (Newton Compton, 2015) ISBN 978 8854182189
- "Corso di psicologia generale e applicata" (Hoepli, 2015) ISBN 978-8820366438
- "È facile vivere bene a Firenze se sai cosa fare" (Newton Compton, 2016) ISBN 9788854195264
- "La stanza di Therese" (Tunuè, 2017) ISBN 9788867901012
- "L'assurda evidenza" (Edizioni Tlon, 2022) ISBN 978-8831498463
- "Sunyata" (Eris, 2023) ISBN 979-1280495723
- "La rivoluzione algoritmica delle immagini" (Sossella, 2024) ISBN 979-1259980601
