= Halie Loren =

American singer-songwriter

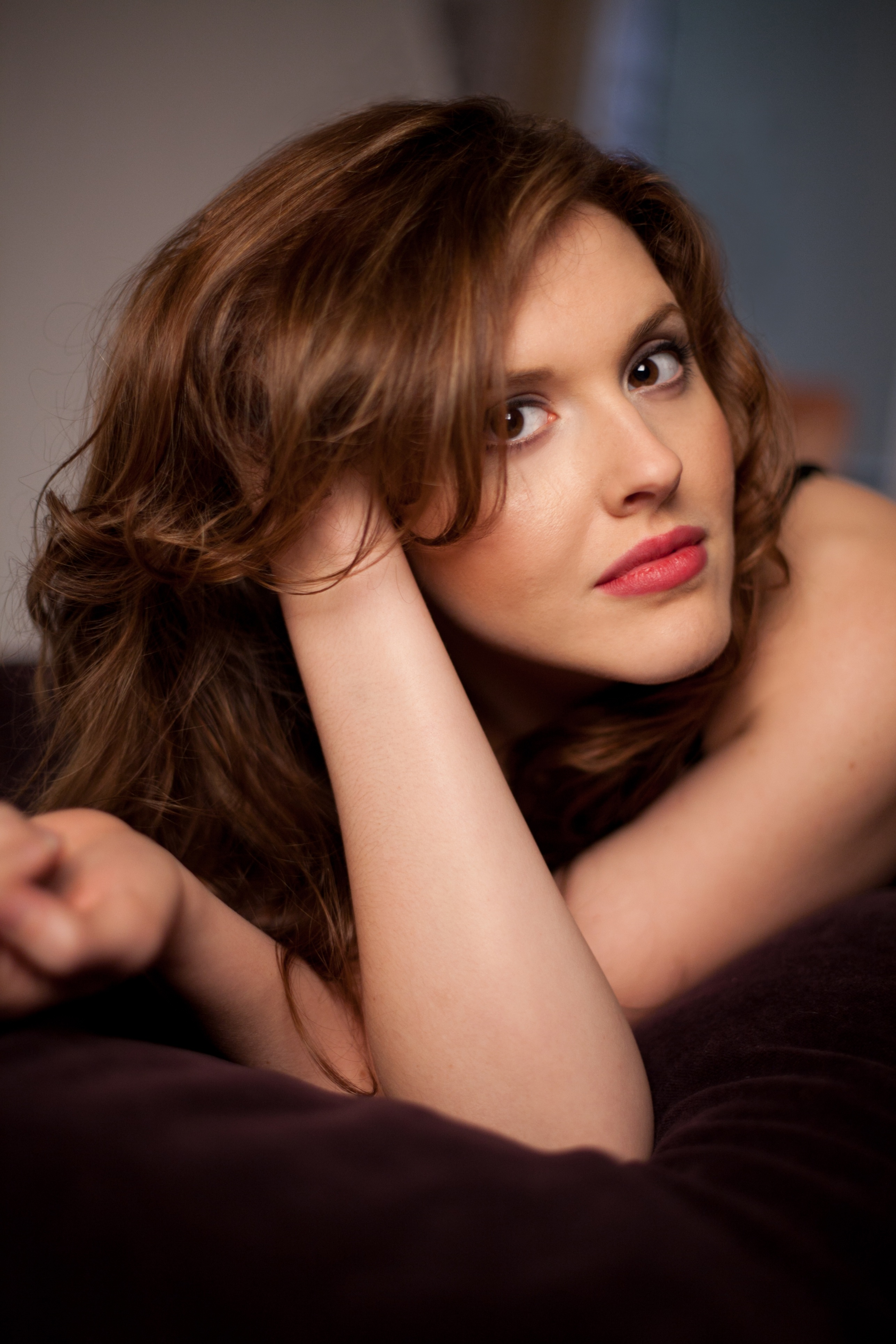
- Loren in 2011

Background information
- Born: October 23, 1984 (age 40); Seattle, Washington, U.S.
- Genres: Jazz, vocal jazz, jazz pop
- Occupation(s): Singer, songwriter
- Years active: 1998–present
- Labels: JVC Kenwood Victor Entertainment, Justin Time
- Website: www.halieloren.com

Halie Loren (born October 23, 1984) is an American jazz singer and songwriter from Sitka, Alaska. Her albums have reached number one on the Billboard Japan Top 20 Jazz Albums chart.

== Biography ==
Loren grew up hearing songs from the Great American Songbook, as well Etta James from her mother's record collection, and Patsy Cline. In her teens she discovered Annie Lennox, Sarah McLachlan, and Joni Mitchell. At the age of 13 she was writing songs, and five years later she won a Billboard World Song Contest. After high school she moved to Nashville and continued to write songs, then went to college in Oregon to study visual arts. She had been performing for five years professionally when at 19 she recorded her debut album Full Circle (2006).

A YouTube video for the single "Perhaps, Perhaps, Perhaps" from They Oughta Write a Song was viewed 5.6 million times as of October 2017.

In 2012, she performed with the Corvallis/OSU Symphony Orchestra and Orchestra Siciliana. In 2013 she performed a holiday concert in Louisiana with the Monroe Symphony Orchestra.

Butterfly Blue (2015) went to number-one in the Billboard Japan jazz album chart. NPR reviewer George D. Graham cited it as one of the best albums of 2015. On Butterly Blue she wrote lyrics for the song "Peace" by Horace Silver.

In 2016, she performed with Oliver Jones at Victoria International JazzFest. She headlined the Britt Orchestra summer pops concert led by music director and conductor Teddy Abrams at the Oregon Britt Festival.

In 2017, Loren toured internationally at the Suwon Jazz Festiva in Korea, Orchestra Siciliana in Italy, the Port-au-Prince International Jazz Festival, and an eight-show engagement at Cotton Club Tokyo. She also performed at Jazz Aspen Snowmass.

== Awards and honors ==
- First Place, Country category, Pacific Songwriting Competition, "What We're Fighting For" written by Halie Loren and Larry Wayne Clark (2005)
- Jazz Song of the Year, "Thirsty", Independent Music Awards, Vox Pop poll (2011)
- Best Vocal Jazz Album, Heart First, Jazz Critique magazine (Japan) (2011)
- They Oughta Write a Song won best vocal jazz album at the 2009 Just Plain Folks awards. and in 2010 became Japan's second highest-selling jazz album.[2]

== Discography ==
- Full Circle (White Moon Productions, 2006)
- They Oughta Write a Song (White Moon, 2008)
- After Dark (White Moon, 2010)
- Many Times, Many Ways (Justin Time, 2010)
- Heart First (Justin Time, 2011)
- Stages (Justin Time, 2012)
- Simply Love (Justin Time, 2013)
- Butterfly Blue (Justin Time, 2015)
- Live At Cotton Club (Justin Time, 2016)
- From the Wild Sky (Victor, 2018)
- Dreams Lost and Found (White Moon, 2024)
