= Wij zeggen nee, nee, nee, tegen een AZC =

2025 AI Dutch protest song

Single by John van der Wijst
- Released: 9 October 2025
- Genre: Hardcore
- Length: 3:11
- Songwriter: John van der Wijst/AI
- Producer: John van der Wijst/AI

"Wij zeggen nee, nee, nee, tegen een AZC" (lit. 'We say no, no, no to an AZC') is an AI generated Dutch protest song generated by JW "Broken Veteran", released on 9 October 2025. it is a protest song against the creation of new asylum shelters ("asielzoekerscentrum", often abbreviated to AZC). The song's lyrics have been described as far-right and xenophobic.

The song went viral in November 2025, peaking at No. 5 on the Dutch Single Top 100 and No. 2 on the Dutch Spotify charts. Following significant controversy and media attention, DistroKid removed the song from streaming on 11 November without JW's approval.

== Background ==
The song was posted by JW "Broken Veteran", who claims to be a veteran from Rotterdam. He claims to have fought in the War in Afghanistan which caused him to suffer post-traumatic stress disorder (PTSD). It was made using AI vocals and production. JW "Broken Veteran" had made almost 200 AI-produced songs with social and political themes since April 2025. He began to write about his experiences in war, mental health and PTSD, but by June, he began to direct his lyrics against topics such as Pro-Palestine protesters, pronouns and asylum seekers, with song titles such as "I Demand My Country Back", "Call Me Right-Wing Extremist" and "Immigration Has Failed". About his usage of AI, JW "Broken Veteran" said that "I can't sing, but I can write poems. And the resources for AI are available, so why not use them?"

There are two versions of the song, the original and the "Hardcore Mix", with the latter quickly becoming the most popular version. By 3 November, streams of the song have earned him over €3,300.

Because of threats he received and his association with the far right, JW "Broken Veteran" announced that he would stop making protest music after the release of his final song, "My Final Chord" on 4 November. He also deleted his Instagram account.

== Lyrics ==
The lyrics of this song protest against the creation of new shelters for asylum seekers ("asielzoekers") in the Netherlands. It contains lines such as "All borders open, our country is in need, the Netherlands is drowning, our heritage is dying", "They call us racists, fascists, people with hate, because we fight for our women" and "they're flooding us with people who don't belong here".

In an interview with Dutch newspaper Algemeen Dagblad, JW "Broken Veteran" told the publication that he is not against "foreigners" but only against "people who want to disrupt our country or are already disrupting it."

== Reception ==
On 1 November 2025, the "Hardcore Mix" of "Wij zeggen nee, nee, nee, tegen een AZC" debuted on the Dutch Single Top 100 at No. 28. By 7 November, the song was the second-most daily streamed song in the Netherlands on Spotify, behind only "The Fate of Ophelia" by Taylor Swift, with over 200,000 streams per day.

The song has been described as far-right and xenophobic by several Dutch media sources. De Volkskrant said that it was "more than a lame meme: it's a worrying signal, especially in light of the recent demonstrations and protests against asylum centers in the Netherlands."

Spotify was asked to remove the song from the platform for violating its policy against music that "incites violence or hate against protected groups of violent extremism" with an "immediate risk". However, Spotify said in a statement that the song "does not violate our platform policy" and it will be allowed to remain on the platform. Lawyer Emile van Reydt believed that the song remains just within the legal limits because "The lyrics are vague and not directly directed at a specifically defined group. You can absolutely argue about whether it is tasteful, but it cannot be ruled out that a judge would rule that the text falls under freedom of expression."

=== Chart battle ===
A counter-movement began in early November to stream the song "Vrijheid, gelijkheid, zusterschap" (lit. 'Freedom, Equality, Sisterhood') by Sophie Straat instead, to prevent "Wij zeggen nee, nee, nee, tegen een AZC" from reaching number one on Dutch Spotify. The campaign was started by the Dutch feminist group Dolle Mina. Straat herself said, "That new AI song against asylum centers is something else, dead scary and above all dangerous. Let's be clear. Immigration is not a problem. Immigration is an enrichment. It's our system that's failing." Straat's song reached number one on Dutch Spotify on 9 November, blocking "AZC" at number two. The artist credit for "AZC" was also temporarily changed to "Intermissible" with the credits "Bad luck, song gone", which JW said made the chart battle "fixed".

VluchtelingenWerk Nederland (Dutch Council for Refugees) created a response version named "Ja ja ja, zo is Nederland", a carnival song with positive lyrics about the way "different cultures enrich our Dutch society." The organisation received increased registrations following the popularity of "AZC".

== Removal ==
On 11 November 2025, the song was removed from all streaming services. JW announced this on a YouTube video titled "Who is the extremist here?" where he suspected that his accounts were hacked and he was investigating how to put it back up. Spotify confirmed that it was pulled by the rights' holder DistroKid. "AZC" had recorded over 1.5 million streams prior to its removal.

== Chart performance ==
Weekly chart performance for "Wij zeggen nee, nee, nee, tegen een AZC (Hardcore Mix)"
| Chart (2025) | Peak position |
|---|---|
| Netherlands (Dutch Top 40 Tipparade) | 15 |
| Netherlands (Single Top 100) | 5 |
