= McDonald's Netherlands =

Dutch franchise of the fast food restaurant chain McDonald's

McDonald's Nederland B.V.
- McDonald's logo used in most of Europe
- Formerly: Family Food N.V. (1970–1975)
- Type: Besloten vennootschap
- Genre: Fast food
- Founder: Jan Sybesma
- Headquarters: Stadsplateau 31-32, 3521 AZ, Utrecht
- Number of locations: 263 (2024)
- Area served: Netherlands
- Key people: Zoe Hamburger (Managing director)
- Products: Hamburgers; chicken; french fries; soft drinks; milkshakes; desserts; pies; coffee; breakfast
- Services: Franchising
- Number of employees: 22.000
- Parent: Ahold (50%) (1970–1975); McDonald's Corporation (1970–present)
- Website: mcdonalds.com/nl/

McDonald's Nederland B.V. is the Dutch master franchise of McDonald's based in the Netherlands.

== History ==
McDonald's Nederland started in 1970 through a joint venture between supermarket chain Albert Heijn (Ahold) and the McDonald's Corporation called Family Food N.V. The first European McDonald's restaurant opened in the Netherlands on 21 August 1971 at the Vermiljoenweg in Zaandam led by franchisiee Jan Sybesma (1935–2014) In 1975, Ahold opted to end the joint venture due to declining sales. McDonald's acquired Ahold's stake and kept its restaurants in Amsterdam Muntplein, Rotterdam Coolsingel and Voorburg, while the locations in Zaandam, Delft, Amsterdam Middenweg and The Hague were sold and rebranded to Mr. Makkie.

Under Sybesma's leadership, McDonald's began expanding its presence rapidly in the Netherlands in the 1980s. The first Drive-through (McDrive) location opened at Huis ter Heide on 12 September 1987.

In 1988, McDonald's Nederland opened a training facility akin to Hamburger University called Hamburger College at their headquarters in Amsterdam.

In January 1994, Jan Sybesma stepped down as general director of the company and was succeeded by Rene Savelberg. that same month, it opened up its 100th restaurant in Maastricht.

In 2020, McDonald's Nederland announced that it would reduce its plastic by removing the lids on McFlurries and switching from plastic straws to paper ones.

In 2022, McDonald's Nederland moved its headquarters from Amsterdam to Utrecht.

== Restaurants ==
McDonald's Nederland has around 263 restaurants in the Netherlands.

The McDonald's restaurant at Coolsingel in Rotterdam was voted the ugliest building in the city in 2014. The building was later demolished and reopened on 27 March 2015 with a golden design.

== Menu ==
During its opening, it served items such as Appelmoes, chicken drumsticks and the McKroket, but were discontinued early on. In February 1999, the McKroket was readded to the menu. In September 2023, a meatless version was introduced, with the original removed during its first month of introduction. This led to angry reactions on social media and a handful of aggressive incidents in restaurants. The chain also serves Fristi and Chocomel drinks since 1993.

== Gallery ==
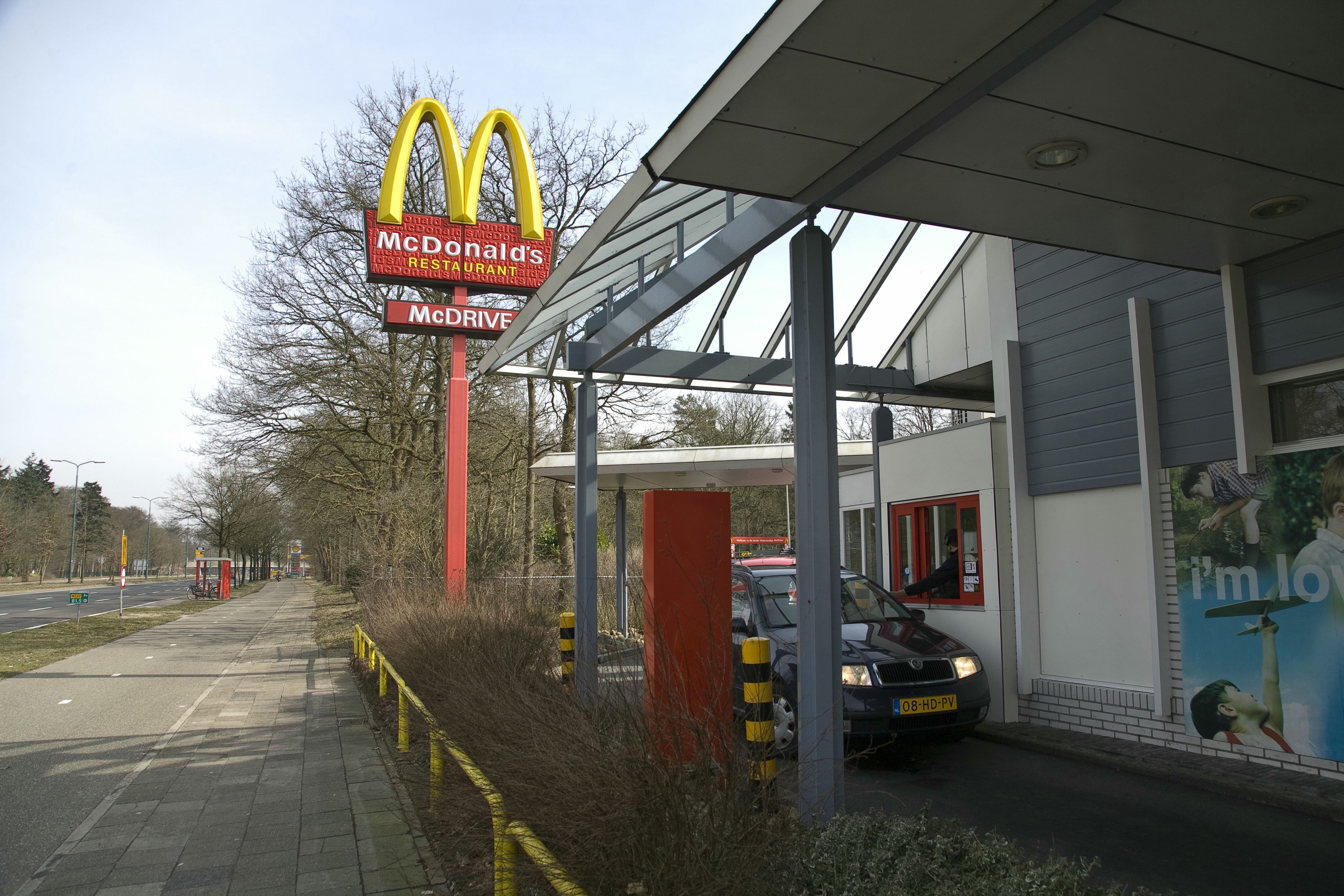
The first McDrive in Huis ter Heide

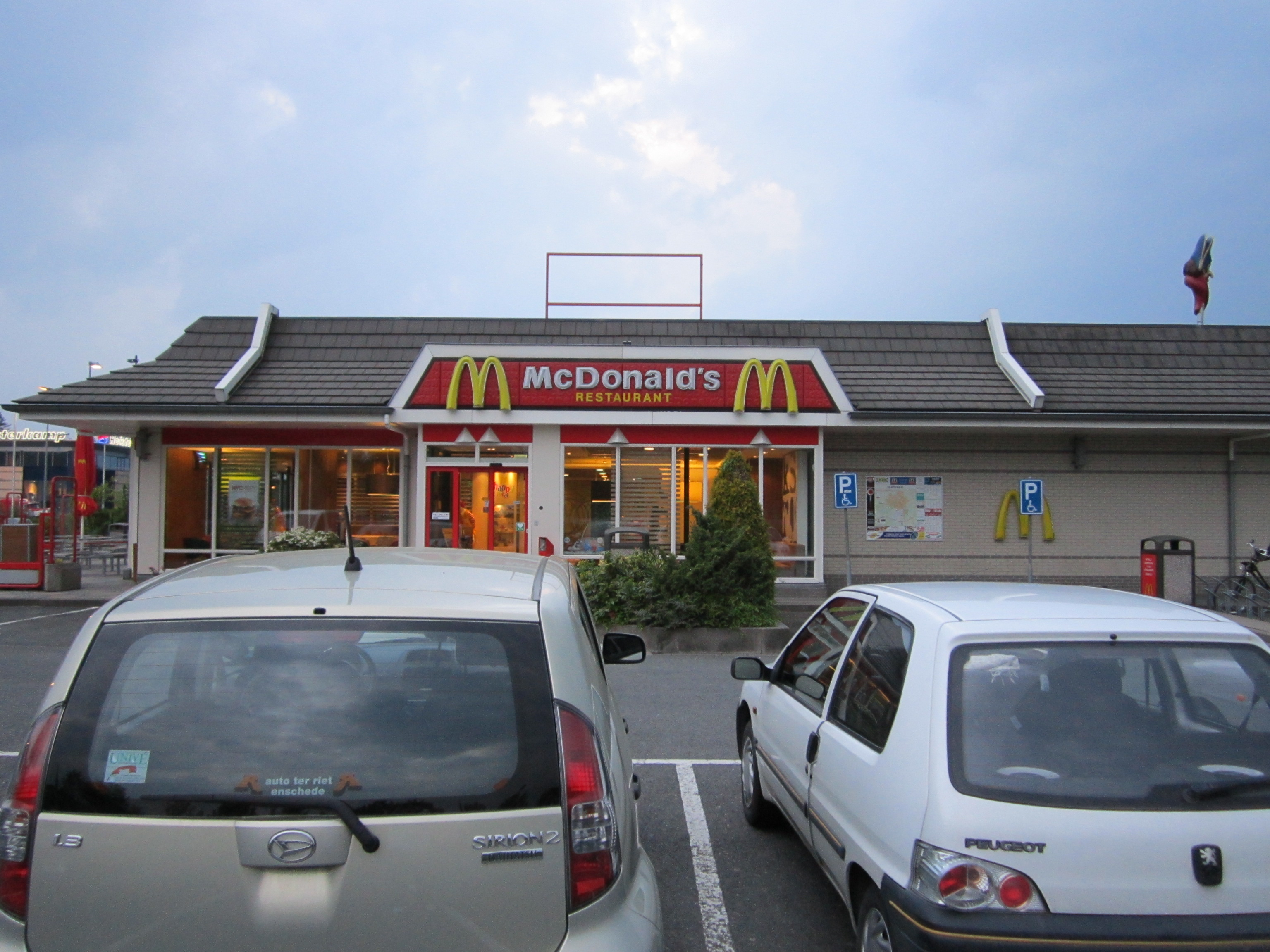
A McDonald's restaurant in Oldenzaal, 2011.

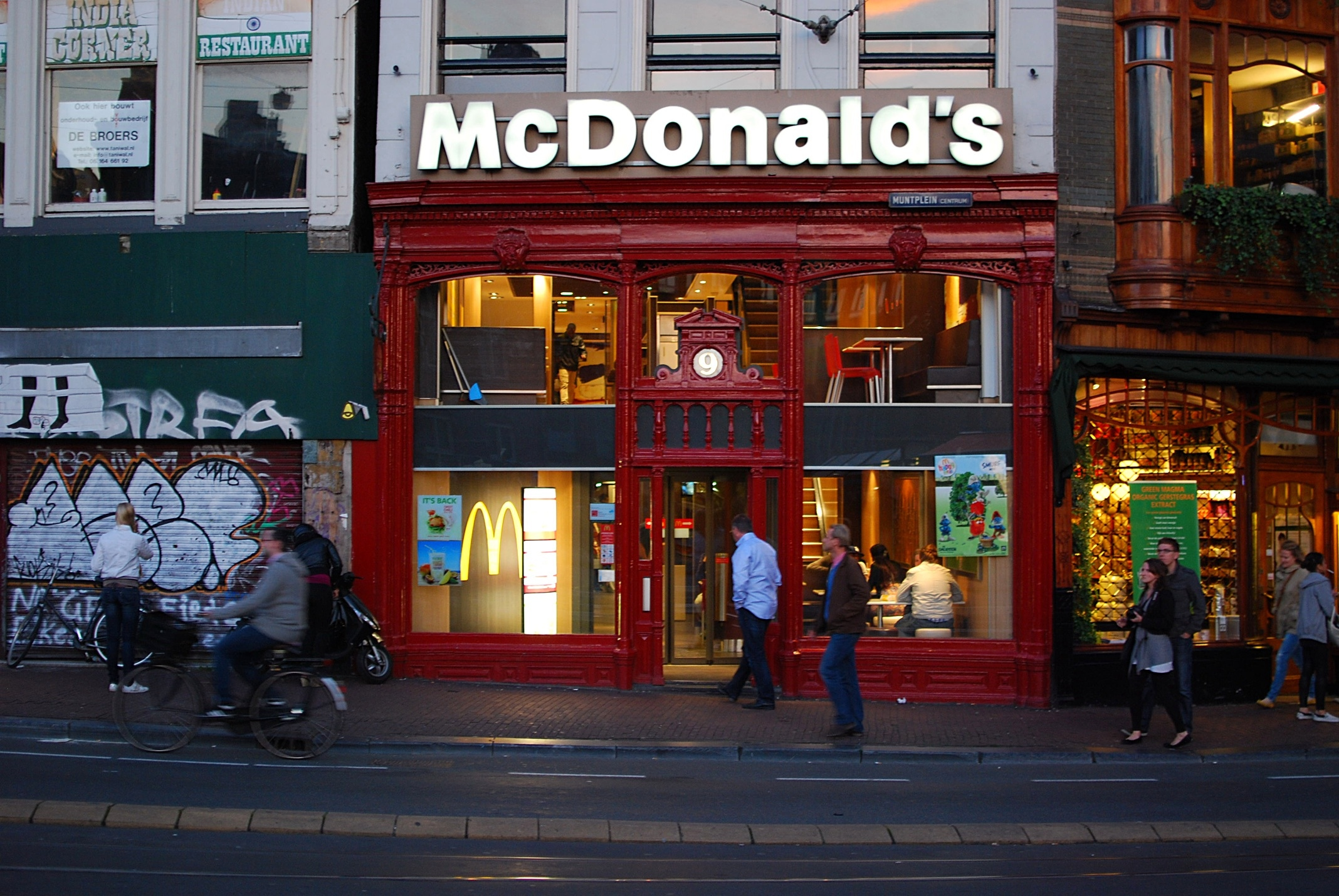

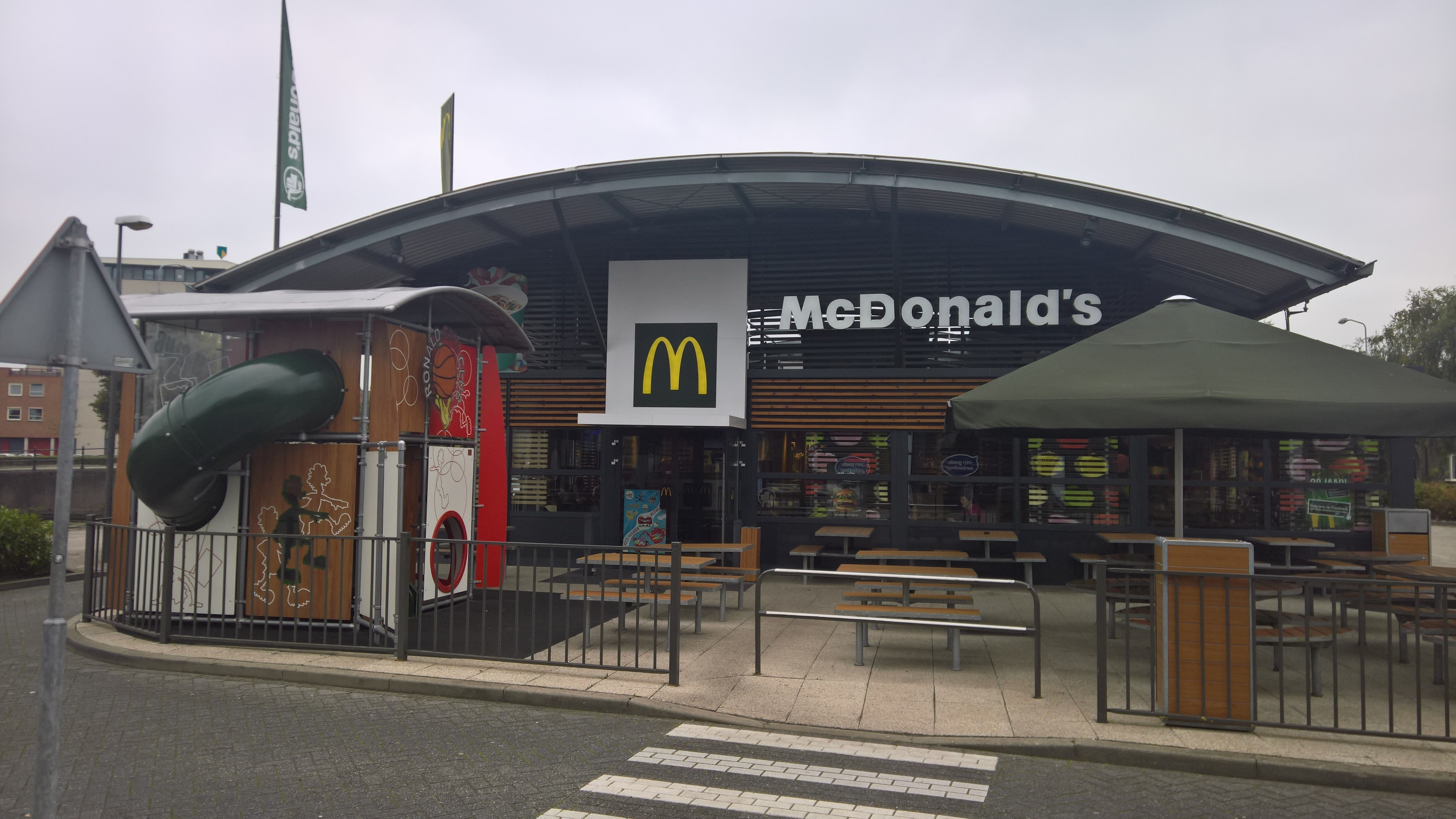
A McDonald's restaurant in Winschoten.
