= Counting Crows discography =

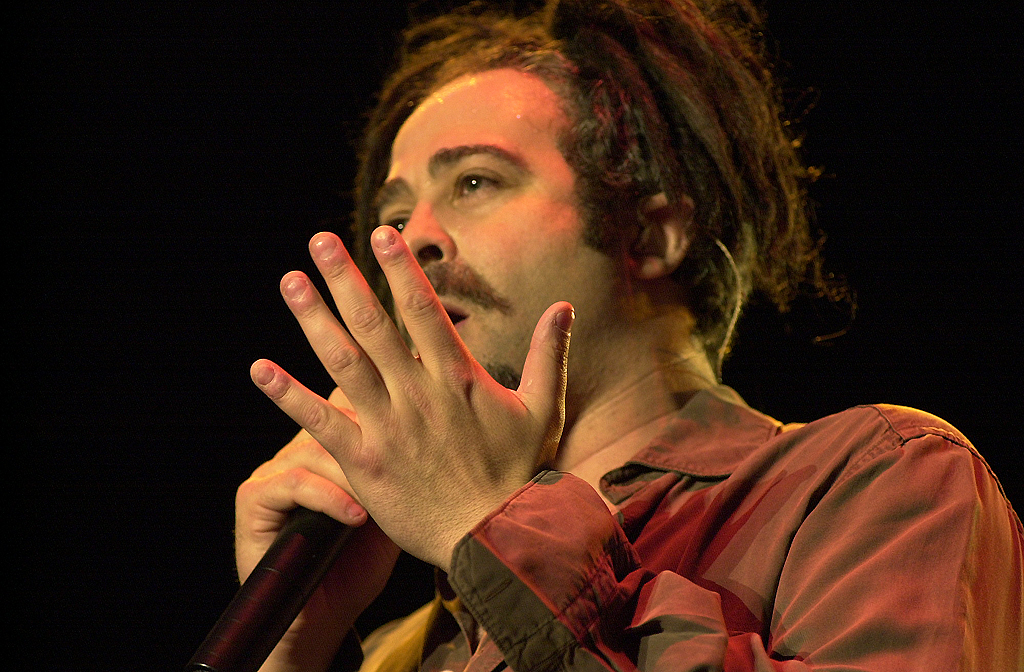
- Adam Duritz, lead singer of Counting Crows
- Studio albums: 8
- Extended plays: 1
- Live albums: 5
- Compilation albums: 2
- Singles: 32

The American rock group Counting Crows has released eight studio albums, one extended play, two compilation albums and five live albums. Five of the band's singles ("Mr. Jones", "A Long December", "Hanginaround", "Round Here", and "Accidentally in Love") charted within the top 40 of the US Radio Songs chart, and "Mr. Jones" and "A Long December" reached the top 10.

Counting Crows's debut album, August and Everything After, was released in September 1993. The album charted within the Top Five of the Billboard 200. August and Everything After was certified seven-times platinum in Canada by the Canadian Recording Industry Association and seven-times platinum in the United States by the Recording Industry Association of America (RIAA). The band's second album, Recovering the Satellites, peaked at number one on the Billboard 200.

Six of the band's albums have charted on the Billboard 200 and four have been certified gold or platinum by the RIAA. Other certified gold releases include the 2003 single "Big Yellow Taxi" and the 2004 single "Accidentally in Love". The latter was released on the Shrek 2 soundtrack.

== Albums ==
=== Studio albums ===
| Title | Album details | Peak chart positions | | | | | | | | | | Certifications |
| Title | Album details | US | AUS | BEL | CAN | GER | IRE | NLD | NZ | SWE | UK | Certifications |
|---|---|---|---|---|---|---|---|---|---|---|---|---|
| August and Everything After | Released: September 14, 1993 (Note: A 2-disc Deluxe Edition was released on September 18, 2007, which included the album and acoustic & unreleased demos on the first disc, and a live performance at Élysée Montmartre in Paris from 1994 on the second disc.); Label: DGC; Formats: CD, cassette, vinyl | 4 | 12 | — | 1 | 56 | 24 | 58 | 12 | 22 | 16 | US: 7× Platinum; AUS: Platinum; CAN: 7× Platinum; NZ: Platinum; UK: Platinum |
| Recovering the Satellites | Released: October 15, 1996; Label: Geffen; Formats: CD, cassette, vinyl | 1 | 7 | 21 | 3 | 40 | — | 54 | 4 | 6 | 4 | US: 2× Platinum; AUS: Gold; CAN: 2× Platinum; NZ: Gold; UK: Gold |
| This Desert Life | Released: November 2, 1999; Label: Geffen; Formats: CD, cassette, vinyl | 8 | 20 | 26 | 7 | 36 | 56 | 21 | 19 | 20 | 19 | US: Platinum; CAN: Platinum; UK: Gold |
| Hard Candy | Released: July 9, 2002; Label: Geffen; Formats: CD | 5 | 13 | 14 | — | 28 | 4 | 10 | 15 | 19 | 9 | US: Gold; AUS: Gold; NZ: Gold; UK: Gold |
| Saturday Nights & Sunday Mornings | Released: March 25, 2008; Label: Geffen; Formats: CD, download | 3 | 22 | 31 | 8 | 57 | 28 | 5 | 36 | 32 | 12 | |
| Underwater Sunshine (or What We Did on Our Summer Vacation) | Released: April 10, 2012; Label: Cooking Vinyl; Formats: CD, download, vinyl | 11 | — | 40 | — | — | 46 | 11 | — | — | 23 | |
| Somewhere Under Wonderland | Released: September 2, 2014; Label: Capitol; Formats: CD, download, vinyl | 6 | 27 | 27 | 10 | 56 | 13 | 12 | — | — | 15 | |
| Butter Miracle, The Complete Sweets! | Released: May 9, 2025; Label: BMG; Formats: CD, download, streaming, vinyl | — | — | — | — | — | — | — | — | — | 81 | |
"—" denotes items that did not chart or were not released in that territory.

=== Compilation albums ===
| Title | Album details | Peak chart positions | | | | | | Certifications |
| Title | Album details | US | AUS | BEL | IRE | NLD | UK | Certifications |
|---|---|---|---|---|---|---|---|---|
| Films About Ghosts (The Best Of...) | Released: November 25, 2003; Label: Geffen; Formats: CD, download | 32 | 70 | 73 | 41 | 1 | 15 | US: Gold; UK: Gold |
| Aural 6 | Released: November 27, 2008; Label: Geffen; Formats: CD, download | — | — | — | — | — | — | |
"—" denotes items that did not chart or were not released in that territory.

=== Live albums ===
| Title | Album details | Peak chart positions | | | | | | | | | Certifications |
| Title | Album details | US | AUS | BEL | CAN | GER | IRE | NLD | NZ | UK | Certifications |
|---|---|---|---|---|---|---|---|---|---|---|---|
| Across a Wire: Live in New York City | Released: July 13, 1998; Label: Geffen; Formats: CD, cassette | 19 | 34 | 16 | 42 | 74 | 63 | 14 | 34 | 27 | US: Platinum; UK: Silver |
| New Amsterdam: Live at Heineken Music Hall | Released: June 19, 2006; Label: Geffen; Formats: CD, download | 52 | — | — | — | — | — | 32 | — | 143 | |
| iTunes Live from Soho | Released: July 22, 2008; Label: Geffen; Formats: Download | 66 | — | — | — | — | — | — | — | — | |
| August and Everything After: Live at Town Hall | Released: August 29, 2011; Label: Eagle Rock; Formats: CD, download, vinyl | 73 | — | — | — | — | — | — | — | — | |
| Echoes of the Outlaw Roadshow | Released: April 8, 2013; Label: Cooking Vinyl; Formats: CD, download, vinyl | — | — | — | — | — | — | 80 | — | — | |
"—" denotes items that did not chart or were not released in that territory.

== Extended plays ==
| Title | EP details |
|---|---|
| Butter Miracle, Suite One | Released: May 21, 2021; Label: BMG; Formats: Download, vinyl |

== Singles ==
=== 1990s ===
| Year | Title | Peak chart positions | | | | | | | | | | Certifications | Album |
| Year | Title | US Air. | US Alt. | US Main. | AUS | CAN | FRA | IRE | NLD | NZ | UK | Certifications | Album |
|---|---|---|---|---|---|---|---|---|---|---|---|---|---|
| 1993 | "Mr. Jones" | 5 | 2 | 2 | 13 | 1 | 7 | 75 | 42 | 49 | 28 | UK: Platinum; RMNZ: 6× Platinum | August and Everything After |
| 1994 | "Round Here" | 31 | 7 | 11 | 58 | 6 | — | — | — | — | 70 | RMNZ: Gold | August and Everything After |
| 1994 | "Omaha" | — | — | — | 85 | — | — | — | — | — | — | | August and Everything After |
| 1994 | "Einstein on the Beach (For an Eggman)" | 45 | 1 | — | — | — | — | — | — | — | — | | DGC Rarities Vol. 1 |
| 1994 | "Rain King" | 66 | — | 4 | — | 18 | — | — | — | — | 49 | | August and Everything After |
| 1995 | "A Murder of One" | — | — | 17 | — | 38 | — | — | — | — | — | | August and Everything After |
| 1996 | "Angels of the Silences" | 45 | 3 | 4 | 77 | 8 | — | — | — | — | 41 | | Recovering the Satellites |
| 1996 | "A Long December" | 6 | 5 | 9 | 86 | 1 | — | — | 68 | — | 62 | | Recovering the Satellites |
| 1997 | "Daylight Fading" | 51 | 26 | 24 | — | 26 | — | — | — | — | 54 | | Recovering the Satellites |
| 1997 | "Have You Seen Me Lately?" | — | 34 | 34 | — | 50 | — | — | — | — | — | | Recovering the Satellites |
| 1999 | "Colorblind" | — | — | — | — | — | 144 | — | — | — | — | | Cruel Intentions: Music From The Original Motion Picture Soundtrack |
| 1999 | "Hanginaround" | 19 | 17 | 37 | 65 | 3 | — | 39 | 87 | 38 | 46 | | This Desert Life |
"—" denotes items that did not chart or were not released in that territory.

=== 2000s ===
| Year | Title | Peak chart positions | | | | | | | | | | Certifications | Album |
| Year | Title | US | US AAA | US Adult | AUS | BEL | GER | IRE | NLD | NZ | UK | Certifications | Album |
|---|---|---|---|---|---|---|---|---|---|---|---|---|---|
| 2000 | "Mrs. Potter's Lullaby" | — | 3 | 40 | — | — | — | — | — | — | — | | This Desert Life |
| 2000 | "All My Friends" | — | 7 | — | — | — | — | — | — | — | — | | This Desert Life |
| 2002 | "American Girls" (featuring Sheryl Crow) | — | 1 | 24 | — | — | — | 47 | 77 | — | 33 | | Hard Candy |
| 2002 | "Miami" | — | 9 | — | — | — | — | — | — | — | — | | Hard Candy |
| 2003 | "Big Yellow Taxi" (featuring Vanessa Carlton) | 42 | 2 | 5 | 3 | 33 | 67 | 7 | 23 | 4 | 16 | US: Gold; AUS: Platinum; RMNZ: 2× Platinum; UK: Silver | Hard Candy |
| 2003 | "If I Could Give All My Love" | — | — | — | 89 | — | — | 40 | 97 | — | 50 | | Hard Candy |
| 2003 | "She Don't Want Nobody Near" | — | 1 | 20 | — | — | — | — | — | — | — | | Films About Ghosts (The Best Of...) |
| 2004 | "Accidentally in Love" | 39 | 1 | 3 | 11 | — | 86 | 3 | 14 | 39 | 28 | US: Gold; AUS: Gold; RMNZ: 2× Platinum; UK: Platinum | Shrek 2: Motion Picture Soundtrack |
| 2004 | "Holiday in Spain" (featuring BLØF) | — | — | — | — | 52 | — | — | 1 | — | — | NLD: Platinum | Het eind van het begin |
| 2008 | "1492" | — | — | — | — | — | — | — | — | — | — | | Saturday Nights & Sunday Mornings |
| 2008 | "You Can't Count on Me" | — (Note: "You Can't Count on Me" did not chart on the Billboard Hot 100, but peaked at number 3 on the Bubbling Under Hot 100 chart.) | 1 | 34 | — | — | — | — | 69 | — | — | | Saturday Nights & Sunday Mornings |
| 2008 | "Come Around" | — | 1 | — | — | — | — | — | — | — | — | | Saturday Nights & Sunday Mornings |
| 2008 | "When I Dream of Michelangelo" | — | 7 | — | — | — | — | — | — | — | — | | Saturday Nights & Sunday Mornings |
"—" denotes items that did not chart or were not released in that territory.

=== 2010s and 2020s ===
| Year | Title | Peak chart positions | | | Album |
| Year | Title | US AAA | US Rock | BEL Tip | Album |
|---|---|---|---|---|---|
| 2012 | "Untitled (Love Song)" | 19 | — | — | Underwater Sunshine |
| 2014 | "Palisades Park" | — | 33 | — | Somewhere Under Wonderland |
| 2014 | "Scarecrow" | 7 | — | 64 | Somewhere Under Wonderland |
| 2014 | "God of Ocean Tides" | — | 42 | — | Somewhere Under Wonderland |
| 2014 | "Earthquake Driver" | — | 30 | 88 | Somewhere Under Wonderland |
| 2021 | "Elevator Boots" | 2 | — | — | Butter Miracle, Suite One |
| 2023 | "Almost Woke You Up" (with Stephen Kellogg) | — | — | — | Non-album single |
| 2025 | "Spaceman in Tulsa" | 6 | — | — | Butter Miracle, The Complete Sweets! |
| 2025 | "Under the Aurora" | — | — | — | Butter Miracle, The Complete Sweets! |
| 2025 | "With Love, From A–Z" | 28 | — | — | Butter Miracle, The Complete Sweets! |
"—" denotes items that did not chart or were not released in that territory.

== Other contributions ==
=== Album ===
| Year | Song | Album |
|---|---|---|
| 1994 | "Einstein on the Beach (For an Eggman)" | DGC Rarities Vol. 1 |
| 1995 | "The Ghost in You" | Clueless: Original Motion Picture Soundtrack |
| 1999 | "Colorblind" | Cruel Intentions: Music from the Original Motion Picture Soundtrack |
| 2000 | "Mrs. Potter's Lullaby" (Live) | On the Mountain Six* |
| 2002 | "Goin' Down to New York Town" | Mr. Deeds: Music from the Motion Picture |
| 2002 | "American Girls" | Live at the World Café: Handcrafted |
| 2004 | "Accidentally in Love"**†‡ | Shrek 2: Motion Picture Soundtrack |
* Track also appears on Live from the Mountain Music Lounge Volume 10 Plus Best of Volumes 1-9 (2004). ** Nominated for Best Original Song at the 77th Annual Academy Awards. † Nominated for Best Original Song at the 62nd Golden Globe Awards. ‡ Nominated for Best Song Written for a Motion Picture, Television or Other Visual Media at the 47th Grammy Awards.

=== Non-album ===
| Year | Song | Project |
|---|---|---|
| 1998 | "Baby, I'm a Big Star Now"* | Rounders (film only**) |
| 2000 | "My Love" | Ropewalk (film only†) |
| 2000 | "Here Comes That Feeling Again" | Ropewalk (film only†) |
| 2002 | "Big Yellow Taxi" (featuring Vanessa Carlton) | Two Weeks Notice (film only‡) |
| 2012 | "Just Like A Woman" (with Augustana) | Roadie (film only†) |
| 2012 | "Load Out" (as Adam Duritz and the Devil and the Bunny Show) | Roadie (film only†) |
| 2019 | "August and Everything After" | Amazon Music Exclusive |
* Subsequently released as a bonus track on the UK release of Saturday Nights & Sunday Mornings. ** The instrumental score for Rounders was released, but no soundtrack has been released. † There has been no soundtrack release for Ropewalk or Roadie. ‡ The instrumental score for Two Weeks Notice was released, but no soundtrack has been released.
