= Aural 6 =

- The cover to Aural 6 is a montage of (top, left to right): August and Everything After, Recovering the Satellites, and Across a Wire: Live in New York City and (bottom, left to right): This Desert Life, Hard Candy, and Saturday Nights & Sunday Mornings

EP compilation sampler album by Counting Crows
- Released: November 27, 2008
- Recorded: 1993–2007, various locations in California
- Genre: Alternative rock
- Length: 25:20
- Label: DGC
- Producers: T-Bone Burnett; Brian Deck; Dennis Herring; Steve Lillywhite; David Lowery; Gil Norton

Counting Crows chronology
iTunes Live from SoHo (2008)	Aural 6 (2008)	August and Everything After: Live at Town Hall (2011)

Aural 6 is an EP by Counting Crows released on November 27, 2008. The Best Buy-exclusive compilation sampler contains tracks from several of their previous albums. This was one of a series of six-song EPs released at Best Buy for $5.99 for Black Friday, 2008.

== Track listing ==
1. "Mr. Jones" (David Bryson and Adam Duritz) – 4:33 (Originally from August and Everything After)
2. "A Long December" (Duritz) – 4:57 (Originally from Recovering the Satellites)
3. "Colorblind" (Charles Gillingham and Duritz) – 3:23 (Originally from This Desert Life)
4. "Hard Candy" (Gillingham, Duritz, and Dan Vickrey) – 4:20 (Originally from Hard Candy)
5. "Hanging Tree" (Duritz and Vickrey) – 3:50 (Originally from Saturday Nights & Sunday Mornings)
6. "Washington Square" – 4:17 (Originally from Saturday Nights & Sunday Mornings)

Although the photo montage on the cover displays Across a Wire: Live in New York City, no tracks from that album appear on this compilation.

== Personnel ==
Counting Crows

- Jim Bogios – drums and percussion on "Hanging Tree" and "Washington Square"
- David Bryson – guitar
- Adam Duritz – vocals, piano on "A Long December"
- Charles Gillingham – piano, Hammond B-3 organ, Mellotron, synthesizer, vocals
- David Immerglück – guitar
- Matt Malley – bass guitar on "A Long December", "Hard Candy", and "Mr. Jones"
- Ben Mize – drums on "Hard Candy"
- Millard Powers – bass guitar on "Hanging Tree" and upright double bass on "Washington Square"
- Dan Vickrey – guitars

Additional musicians

- Denny Fongheiser – drums and percussion on "Mr. Jones"
- David Gibbs – backing vocals on "Hard Candy"
- Matthew Sweet – backing vocals on "Hard Candy"

Production

- "Colorblind" – Dennis Herring and David Lowery
- "Hanging Tree" – Gil Norton
- "Hard Candy" – Steve Lillywhite
- "A Long December" – Gil Norton
- "Mr. Jones" – T-Bone Burnett
- "Washington Square" – Brian Deck
