= Across a Wire: Live in New York City =

Live album by Counting Crows
- Released: July 13, 1998
- Recorded: Chelsea Studios, New York City, August 12, 1997, and Hammerstein Ballroom, New York City, November 6, 1997
- Genre: Alternative rock
- Length: 121:54
- Label: Geffen
- Producers: Sean Murphy and Mike Simon, Nancy McDonald

Counting Crows chronology
| Recovering the Satellites (1996) | Across a Wire: Live in New York City (1998) | This Desert Life (1999) |

Professional ratings
Review scores
| Source | Rating |
|---|---|
| AllMusic | 3/5 stars |
| Entertainment Weekly | C+ |
| Rolling Stone | 2.5/5 stars |

Across a Wire: Live in New York City (also known as Across a Wire: Live in New York for short) is the third album released by American rock band Counting Crows, released on July 14, 1998. It is a double-live album, featuring songs from their first two albums, August and Everything After (1993) and Recovering the Satellites (1996). Because the album contained two discs, the release was certified platinum by the RIAA for shipments of over 500,000 copies.

The first disc, recorded for VH1 Storytellers, is acoustic and intimate; it also contains a previously unreleased hidden track, "Chelsea". The second disc, recorded for MTV's Live from the 10 Spot show, is rocky and direct.

The cover art for the album, featuring electrical poles with the Statue of Liberty in the background, is taken from a 1967 photograph by David Plowden entitled "Statue of Liberty from Caven Point Road, Jersey City, New Jersey."

== Track listing ==
All tracks are written by Adam F. Duritz unless otherwise indicated.

Disc One: VH1 Storytellers (Chelsea Studios, NYC - August 12, 1997)
| No. | Title | Writer(s) | Length |
|---|---|---|---|
| 1. | "Round Here" | Duritz; Dave Janusko; Dan Jewett; Chris Roldan; David Bryson | 6:16 |
| 2. | "Have You Seen Me Lately?" | | 3:57 |
| 3. | "Angels of the Silences" | Duritz; Charles Gillingham | 3:57 |
| 4. | "Catapult" | | 3:57 |
| 5. | "Mr. Jones" | Duritz; Bryson | 5:17 |
| 6. | "Rain King" | Duritz; Bryson | 5:51 |
| 7. | "Mercury" | | 3:45 |
| 8. | "Ghost Train" | | 5:27 |
| 9. | "Anna Begins" | Duritz; Bryson; Marty Jones; Toby Hawkins; Lydia Holly | 13:55 |
| 10. | "Chelsea*" | Duritz; Bryson; Gillingham; Malley | 6:15 |
| Total length: | | | 58:37 |

Disc Two: MTV Live from the 10 Spot (Hammerstein Ballroom, NYC - November 6, 1997)
| No. | Title | Writer(s) | Length |
|---|---|---|---|
| 1. | "Recovering the Satellites" | | 5:39 |
| 2. | "Angels of the Silences" | Duritz; Gillingham | 3:34 |
| 3. | "Rain King" | Duritz; Bryson | 5:48 |
| 4. | "Sullivan Street" | Duritz; Bryson | 4:37 |
| 5. | "Children in Bloom" | | 5:19 |
| 6. | "Have You Seen Me Lately?" | | 4:10 |
| 7. | "Raining in Baltimore" | | 5:34 |
| 8. | "Round Here (feat. "Have You Seen Me Lately?" alt)" | Duritz; Janusko; Jewett; Roldan; Bryson | 10:00 |
| 9. | "I'm Not Sleeping" | | 4:58 |
| 10. | "A Murder of One" | Duritz; Bryson; Malley | 3:35 |
| 11. | "A Long December" | | 6:06 |
| 12. | "Walkaways" | Duritz; Dan Vickrey | 1:50 |
| Total length: | | | 61:10 |

* Studio track recorded during sessions for 'Recovering the Satellites' but left off the album.

== Personnel ==
=== Counting Crows ===
- Adam Duritz – lead vocals, piano
- Charlie Gillingham – Hammond B-3, keyboards, piano, Wurlitzer, accordion, backing vocals
- David Bryson – electric and acoustic guitars
- Dan Vickrey – electric and acoustic guitars, banjo, backing vocals
- Matt Malley – bass, double bass
- Ben Mize – drums, percussion

=== Technical ===
- Recorded by John Harris
- Mixed by Bob Clearmountain
- Second engineers – David Boucher and Ryan Freeland
- Digital editor – Ryan Freeland
- Mastered by Bob Ludwig at Gateway Mastering (Portland, Maine)
- Art direction – Bill Merryfield and Mary Ann Dibbs
- Design – Mary Ann Dibbs, Bill Merryfield, and Anthony Altieri
- Cover photography – David Plowden
- Back cover photography – Jack Pierson
- Inside photography – Niels Alpert, Jack Pierson, Dennis Keeley, Chris Strother, Greg Bartram, Amy Milam, Tony George, Kory Carter, and Jeff Payatt
- Management – Steven Jensen and Martin Kirkup

== Chart performance ==
| Chart (1998) | Peak position |
|---|---|
| Australian Albums (ARIA) | 34 |
| Belgian Albums (Ultratop Flanders) | 16 |
| Dutch Albums (Album Top 100) | 14 |
| German Albums (Offizielle Top 100) | 74 |
| Irish Albums (IRMA) | 63 |
| New Zealand Albums (RMNZ) | 34 |
| Scottish Albums (Official Charts) | 46 |
| UK Albums (Official Charts) | 27 |
| US Billboard 200 | 19 |

== Certifications ==
| Organization | Level | Date |
|---|---|---|
| RIAA – U.S. | Gold | September 22, 1998 |
| RIAA – U.S. | Platinum | October 25, 2005 |
