= August and Everything After: Live at Town Hall =

2011 live album by Counting Crows

Live album by Counting Crows
- Released: August 29, 2011
- Recorded: Town Hall, New York City; September 18, 2007
- Genre: Alternative rock
- Length: 76:30
- Label: Eagle Rock

Counting Crows chronology
Aural 6 (2009)	August and Everything After: Live at Town Hall (2011)	Underwater Sunshine (Or What We Did on Our Summer Vacation) (2012)

Counting Crows live chronology
iTunes Live from SoHo (2008)	August and Everything After: Live at Town Hall (2011)	Echoes of the Outlaw Roadshow (2013)

August and Everything After: Live at Town Hall

Video by Counting Crows
- Released: August 30, 2011
- Recorded: September 18, 2007
- Genre: Alternative rock
- Length: 76:30
- Label: Eagle Rock Entertainment

August and Everything After: Live at Town Hall is a live album and video by Counting Crows. The DVD and Blu-ray Disc versions represent the first official live concert video release of the band's career.

== Release ==
The concert was released on DVD and Blu-ray Disc video formats, as well as in album form on CD and LP, on August 30, 2011, in the United States. The album was also made available via digital download through Amazon.com and iTunes one day earlier.

== Songs ==
The live concert was recorded at Town Hall in New York City on September 18, 2007. It features a performance of the band's 1993 commercial debut album, August and Everything After, in its entirety. The band performed the songs in the exact track list order featured on the album, except for the inclusion of lyrics of the song "Raining in Baltimore" in their performance of their hit single "Round Here".

== Track listing ==
All songs written by Adam Duritz unless otherwise noted.

1. "Round Here"* (Duritz, Dave Janusko, Dan Jewett, Chris Roldan, David Bryson) – 11:42
2. "Omaha" – 3:43
3. "Mr. Jones" (Duritz, Bryson) – 6:19
4. "Introduction to Perfect Blue Buildings" – 1:12
5. "Perfect Blue Buildings"* – 5:05
6. "Anna Begins" (Duritz, Bryson, Marty Jones, Toby Hawkins, Lydia Holly) – 5:34
7. "Time and Time Again" (Duritz, Bryson, Charlie Gillingham, Steve Bowman, Don Dixon) – 5:50
8. "Rain King"* (Duritz, Bryson) – 8:57
9. "Introduction to Sullivan Street" – 2:25
10. "Sullivan Street" (Duritz, Bryson) – 8:42
11. "Ghost Train" – 5:54
12. "A Murder of One"* (Duritz, Bryson, Matt Malley) – 11:07

* Track No. 1 includes lyrics of the song "Raining in Baltimore" and the Sordid Humor song "Private Archipelago".
* Track No. 5 includes lyrics of the song "Miller's Angels" and the Prince song "Sometimes it Snows in April".
* Track No. 8 includes lyrics of the Bruce Springsteen song "Thunder Road".
* Track No. 12 includes lyrics of the U2 song "Red Hill Mining Town" and the Sordid Humor song "Dorris Day".

== Personnel ==
- Jim Bogios – drums, vocals, and percussion
- David Bryson – electric guitar, acoustic guitar, and vocals
- Adam Duritz – vocals
- Charlie Gillingham – piano, Hammond B-3 organ, accordion, harmonica, and vocals
- David Immergluck – electric guitar, acoustic guitar, mandolin, pedal steel, and vocals
- Millard Powers – bass, vocals, and piano
- Dan Vickrey – electric guitar, acoustic guitar, banjo, and vocals
