= New Amsterdam: Live at Heineken Music Hall February 4–6, 2003 =

Live album by Counting Crows
- Released: June 19, 2006
- Genre: Alternative rock
- Length: 74:30
- Label: Geffen

Counting Crows chronology
| Films About Ghosts (2003) | New Amsterdam: Live at Heineken Music Hall February 4–6, 2003 (2006) | Saturday Nights & Sunday Mornings (2008) |

Professional ratings
Review scores
| Source | Rating |
|---|---|
| Absolutepunk.net | 62% link |
| Allmusic | link |

New Amsterdam - Live at Heineken Music Hall is the second live album by American rock band Counting Crows, released by Geffen Records on June 19, 2006, in the United Kingdom and the following day in the United States. The live performance was recorded in the Heineken Music Hall in Amsterdam, The Netherlands between February 4–6, 2003.

== Reception ==
AllMusic's Thom Jurek praised the release, stating that it "feels warts-and-all, like a special kind of bootleg," that ultimately gives an insight into vocalist and lyricist Adam Duritz's state of mind. Jurek states that the track listing, "as strange and beguiling as it is, is a flawed and fitting testament to the Counting Crows' continued trudge out there on the margins of rock & roll."

== Track listing ==
All tracks written by Adam F. Duritz unless otherwise indicated.

1. "Rain King" (Duritz, David Bryson) – 7:23
2. "Richard Manuel is Dead" (Duritz, Daniel J. Vickrey, David Immerglück, Charles Gillingham, Matt Malley) – 3:57
3. "Catapult" (Duritz, Malley, Vickrey, Ben Mize, Bryson, Gillingham) – 3:40
4. "Goodnight L.A." – 4:29
5. "Four White Stallions" (Jeff Trott, Patrick Winningham, Vickrey) – 4:11
6. "Omaha" – 3:49
7. "Miami" (Duritz, Gillingham, Immerglück) – 5:11
8. "Hazy" (Duritz, Gemma Hayes) – 2:54
9. "Good Time" – 5:13
10. "St. Robinson in His Cadillac Dream" – 5:20
11. "Perfect Blue Buildings" – 5:04
12. "Hanginaround" (Duritz, Vickrey, Mize, Bryson) – 5:29
13. "Goodnight Elisabeth" – 8:13
14. "Hard Candy" (Duritz, Vickrey, Gillingham) – 4:53
15. "Holiday in Spain" – 4:44

Bonus tracks

16. "Mr. Jones (Live at the Ahoy)" (UK version) (Duritz, Bryson)
16. "Blues Run the Game" (Barnes & Noble bonus track, also available on UK, Dutch and Brazilian versions) (Jackson C. Frank) – 3:56
16. "Big Yellow Taxi" (Best Buy bonus track) (Joni Mitchell) – 3:46
16. "Black and Blue" (iTunes bonus track)

== Personnel ==
Counting Crows

- Jim Bogios – drums, backing vocals
- David Bryson – guitar, backing vocals
- Adam Duritz – vocals, piano
- Charlie Gillingham – piano, Hammond B-3 organ, keyboards, backing vocals
- David Immerglück – guitar, mandolin, pedal steel, backing vocals
- Matt Malley – bass guitar, piano, backing vocals
- Dan Vickrey – guitar, backing vocals

Recording personnel

- François Lamoureux – recording
- Pat Morrow – recording coordinator
- Bob Clearmountain – mixing
- Brandon Duncan – mixing assistant
- Kevin Harp – mixing assistant
- Bob Ludwig – mastering

Artwork

- Felipe Molina – album art
- Frank Olinsky – design
