= Holiday in Spain (song) =

2002 song by Counting Crows

Song by Counting Crows

from the album Hard Candy
- Studio: Ocean Way Recording (Hollywood, California); Westside (London, England)
- Length: 3:48
- Label: Geffen
- Songwriter: Adam F. Duritz
- Producer: Steve Lillywhite

"Holiday in Spain"

Single by Counting Crows with BLØF

from the album Het eind van het begin
- Released: May 28, 2004
- Recorded: March 2004
- Studio: Wisseloord (Hilversum, Netherlands)
- Length: 3:52
- Label: Geffen
- Composer: Adam F. Duritz
- Lyricists: Adam F. Duritz; Peter Slager
- Producers: Counting Crows; BLØF

Counting Crows singles chronology
"Accidentally in Love" (2004)	"Holiday in Spain" (2004)	"1492" (2008)

"Holiday in Spain" is a song by American rock band Counting Crows from their fourth studio album, Hard Candy (2002), and later recorded as a duet with Dutch pop-rock group BLØF in 2004. This version features BLØF singing parts of the song in Dutch, whereas the parts performed by Counting Crows are sung in English. Regardless of language changes, the lyrics remain consistent throughout the song. The duet version is included on BLØF's 2004 compilation album, Het eind van het begin.

Released as a single in Europe on May 28, 2004, the duet became a platinum-selling hit in the Netherlands, reaching number one on both the Dutch Top 40 and Single Top 100 charts. The three CD singles released include additional Counting Crows songs that were recorded live at Rotterdam Ahoy on March 10, 2004, including "Mr. Jones", "Daylight Fading", and "Hanginaround". The original version of "Holiday in Spain" also appears on Counting Crows' compilation album Films About Ghosts (The Best Of...) (2003).

== Track listings ==
All live tracks were recorded on March 10, 2004, at Ahoy, Holland.

European CD1

1. "Holiday in Spain" (with BLØF)
2. "Good Time" (live at Ahoy, Holland)
3. "Mr. Jones" (live at Ahoy, Holland)
4. "Round Here" (live at Ahoy, Holland)

European CD2

1. "Holiday in Spain" (with BLØF)
2. "Rain King" (live at Ahoy, Holland)
3. "St. Robinson in His Cadillac Dream" (live at Ahoy, Holland)
4. "Hanginaround" (live at Ahoy, Holland)

European CD3

1. "Holiday in Spain" (with BLØF)
2. "Daylight Fading" (live at Ahoy, Holland)
3. "Hard Candy" (live at Ahoy, Holland)
4. "Holiday in Spain" (with BLØF live at Ahoy, Holland)

== Credits and personnel ==
=== Original version ===
Credits are adapted from the Hard Candy booklet.

Studios

- Recorded at Ocean Way Recording (Hollywood, California) and Westside Studios (London, England)
- Mastered at Gateway Mastering (Portland, Maine, US)

Counting Crows

- Adam F. Duritz – words, music, vocals, piano, string sampler
- Dan Vickrey – electric and acoustic guitars, banjo, vocals
- Ben Mize – drums, percussion, loops, vocals
- Matt Malley – bass guitar, upright bass, vocals
- David Immerglück – electric and acoustic guitars, mandolin, bass, vocals
- Charles Gillingham – piano, other keys, synthesizer, vocals
- David Bryson – electric and acoustic guitars, vocals

Other personnel

- Steve Lillywhite – production
- Cindi Peters – production coordination
- Jack Joseph Puig – mixing
- Carl Glanville – recording
- Bob Ludwig – mastering

=== Duet version ===
Credits are adapted from the European CD2 liner notes.

Studios

- Recorded in March 2004 at Wisseloord Studios (Hilversum, Netherlands)
- Mixed at Down Under Studio (Hilversum, Netherlands)
- Mastered at Q Point Digital Audio (Hilversum, Netherlands)

Personnel

- Adam F. Duritz – words, music
- Peter Slager – words
- Counting Crows – production
- BLØF – production
- Holger Schwedt – recording, engineering, mixing
- Arjen Mensinga – additional engineering
- Marty Brugmans – additional engineering
- Peter Brussee – mastering

== Charts ==
=== Weekly charts ===
Chart (2004)	Peak position
Belgium (Ultratip Bubbling Under Flanders)	2
Netherlands (Dutch Top 40)	1
Netherlands (Single Top 100)	1

=== Year-end charts ===
Chart (2004)	Position
Netherlands (Dutch Top 40)	2
Netherlands (Single Top 100)	3

=== Decade-end charts ===
Chart (2000–2009)	Position
Netherlands (Single Top 100)	18

== Certifications ==
Region	Certification	Certified units/sales
Netherlands (NVPI)	Platinum	60,000^{^}
^{^} Shipments figures based on certification alone.

== Release history ==
Region	Date	Format(s)	Label(s)	Ref.
Europe	May 28, 2004	CD: CD1	Geffen	
Europe	June 11, 2004	CD: CD2	Geffen	
Europe	June 26, 2004	CD: CD3	Geffen	
