= Daylight Fading =

1997 single by Counting Crows

Single by Counting Crows

from the album Recovering the Satellites
- Released: May 19, 1997
- Recorded: Early 1996
- Studio: The Sound Factory (Los Angeles)
- Genre: Rock
- Length: 3:50
- Label: DGC; Geffen
- Songwriters: David Bryson; Adam Duritz; Charlie Gillingham; Matt Malley; Ben Mize; Dan Vickrey
- Producer: Gil Norton

Counting Crows singles chronology
"A Long December" (1996)	"Daylight Fading" (1997)	"Hanginaround" (1999)

"Daylight Fading" is a song by the American rock band Counting Crows. It is the third track and third single from their second album, Recovering the Satellites (1996). This song, along with previous releases such as "Mr. Jones" and "A Long December," had video rotation on MTV and VH1. The single peaked at No. 26 on the US Billboard Modern Rock Tracks chart.

== Track listing ==
1. "Daylight Fading"
2. "Rain King" (live)
3. "Daylight Fading" (live)

== Charts ==
=== Weekly charts ===
Chart (1997)	Peak position
Canada Top Singles (RPM)	26
Scottish Singles Sales (Official Charts)	40
UK Singles (Official Charts)	54
US Radio Songs (Billboard)	51
US Adult Alternative Airplay (Billboard)	5
US Adult Pop Airplay (Billboard)	20
US Alternative Airplay (Billboard)	26
US Mainstream Rock (Billboard)	24
US Pop Airplay (Billboard)	26

=== Year-end charts ===
Chart (1997)	Position
US Mainstream Rock Tracks (Billboard)	93
US Triple-A (Billboard)	29

== Release history ==
Region	Date	Format(s)	Label(s)	Ref.
United States	1997	Rock radio	DGC	
United States	May 6, 1997	Contemporary hit radio	DGC	
United Kingdom	May 19, 1997	CD; cassette	Geffen	
