= Angels of the Silences =

1996 single by Counting Crows

Single by Counting Crows

from the album Recovering the Satellites
- Released: September 24, 1996
- Recorded: Early 1996
- Studio: The Sound Factory (Los Angeles)
- Genre: Rock
- Length: 3:37
- Label: DGC, Geffen
- Songwriters: David Bryson, Adam Duritz, Charlie Gillingham, Matt Malley, Ben Mize, Dan Vickrey.
- Producer: Gil Norton

Counting Crows singles chronology
"A Murder of One" (1995)	"Angels of the Silences" (1996)	"A Long December" (1996)

"Angels of the Silences" is a song by American alternative rock band Counting Crows. It is the lead single and second track from their second album, Recovering the Satellites (1996). The song peaked at number three on the US Billboard Modern Rock Tracks chart, making it the highest-placing single from the album.

== Background ==
Adam Duritz said about that song (from Storytellers):

I write quite a few songs where the sort of issue is faith–having faith, keeping faith. And this song in particular is about the difficulty in having faith in things, and finding things to have faith in, in yourself, in God, in like he said, a woman. Faith is a weird thing, it in a sense it is all about waiting. It's not actually about getting anything, you know, faith is about the wait, because once you get something there is no need anymore. So a lot about faith is just the willingness to sort of throw yourself on a fence and hang there for a while. That's a very difficult and bitter thing, you know. In this song, I keep saying the main character, *I*, I said, "All my sins, I would pay for them if I could come back to you." It's not just about finding things to believe in, it's about wanting to be able to believe in anything too. And it's about all the voices that get inside your head and whisper for you to do it or not to do it as well. And it's called "Angels of the Silences."

== Writing ==
Similar to the content of the rest of Recovering the Satellites, the song has a heavier sound than that of Counting Crows' debut, August and Everything After, incorporating distorted guitar riffs, blearier production, and higher emphasis on percussion to create a driving and dirty instrumental. The song is in the key of E Major with a tempo of 160 BPM.

== Track listing ==
CD single
No.	Title	Length
1.	"Angels of the Silences"	3:39
2.	"Recovering the Satellites"	5:23
3.	"Round Here" (live)	11:53

== Personnel ==
- David Bryson – guitar
- Adam Duritz – lead vocals
- Charlie Gillingham – Hammond B-3, background vocals
- Matt Malley – electric bass
- Ben Mize – drums
- Dan Vickrey – guitar

== Charts ==
=== Weekly charts ===
Chart (1996)	Peak position
Australia (ARIA)	77
Canada Top Singles (RPM)	8
Canada Rock/Alternative (RPM)	8
European Alternative Rock (Music & Media)	7
Scottish Singles Sales (Official Charts)	30
Spain Airplay (Music & Media)	8
Sweden (Sverigetopplistan)	55
UK Singles (Official Charts)	41
US Radio Songs (Billboard)	45
US Adult Alternative Airplay (Billboard)	19
US Alternative Airplay (Billboard)	3
US Mainstream Rock (Billboard)	4

=== Year-end charts ===
Chart (1996)	Position
US Mainstream Rock Tracks (Billboard)	64
US Modern Rock Tracks (Billboard)	68

Chart (1997)	Position
US Mainstream Rock Tracks (Billboard)	85

== Release history ==
Region	Date	Format(s)	Label(s)	Ref.
United States	September 24, 1996	Contemporary hit radio	DGC	
United States	September 30, 1996	Alternative radio	DGC	
Japan	October 2, 1996	CD	Geffen	
United Kingdom	October 7, 1996	CD; cassette	Geffen	
