= Echoes of the Outlaw Roadshow =

Live album by Counting Crows

Live album by Counting Crows
- Released: April 8, 2013
- Recorded: 2012, live across the United States
- Genre: Alternative rock, country rock
- Length: 79:23
- Language: English
- Label: Cooking Vinyl

Counting Crows chronology
Underwater Sunshine (or What We Did on Our Summer Vacation) (2012)	Echoes of the Outlaw Roadshow (2013)	Somewhere Under Wonderland (2014)

Professional ratings
Review scores
Source	Rating
AbsolutePunk	7.5/10

Echoes of the Outlaw Roadshow is a 2013 live album from American alternative rock band Counting Crows, released on Cooking Vinyl. The album was made available by the band through digital distributors, physical media, and pre-orders for tickets to their co-headlining tour with The Wallflowers. As of 2024, it is their most recent live release (excluding soundboard releases from numerous tours)

== Track listing ==
1. "Girl from the North Country" (Bob Dylan) – 6:04
2. "Round Here" (David Bryson, Adam Duritz, Dave Janusko, Dan Jewett, and Chris Roldan) – 10:12
3. "Untitled (Love Song)" (Luke McMaster) – 4:52
4. "Four Days" (Adam Duritz) – 3:32
5. "Hospital" (Coby Brown) – 3:07
6. "Carriage" (Duritz) – 4:04
7. "Start Again" (Norman Blake) – 3:29
8. "I Wish I Was a Girl" (Duritz and Charlie Gillingham) – 5:48
9. "Sundays" (Duritz) – 4:39
10. "Mercury" (Duritz) – 6:37
11. "Friend of the Devil" (John Dawson, Jerry Garcia, and Robert Hunter) – 4:32
12. "Rain King" (Bryson and Duritz) – 7:38
13. "Le Ballet d'Or" (Duritz, Gillingham, and David Immerglück) – 5:01
14. "Up All Night (Frankie Miller Goes to Hollywood)" (Duritz) – 5:22
15. "You Ain't Goin' Nowhere" (Dylan) – 4:26
- Track No. 12 includes lyrics of the Elbow song "Lippy Kids".

== Tour dates ==
Date	City	Venue
March 9, 2012	San Francisco	Slim's Nightclub
March 10, 2012	San Francisco	Great American Music Hall
April 13, 2012	Seattle	Showbox Sodo
April 14, 2012	Portland	Roseland Theatre
April 16, 2012	Oakland	Fox Theater
April 17, 2012	Los Angeles	Club Nokia
April 19, 2012	Denver	Paramount Theater
April 21, 2012	Minneapolis	State Theatre
April 22, 2012	Chicago	Riviera Theatre
April 24, 2012	New York City	Roseland Ballroom
April 25, 2012	Boston	House of Blues
April 27, 2012	Mashantucket	MGM Grand Casino
April 28, 2012	Atlantic City	Borgata Spas and Resorts
May 1, 2012	Jacksonville	Florida Theatre
May 2, 2012	West Palm Beach	SunFest
May 4, 2012	Atlanta	The Tabernacle
May 5, 2012	Nashville	Ryman Auditorium
June 8, 2012	New York City	Good Morning America
November 25, 2012	Anaheim	Grove of Anaheim

== Personnel ==
Counting Crows

- Jim Bogios – drums, backing vocals
- David Bryson – guitar, backing vocals
- Adam Duritz – lead vocals, piano
- Charlie Gillingham – accordion, keyboards, piano
- David Immerglück – guitar
- Millard Powers – bass guitar, backing vocals
- Dan Vickrey – lead guitar, backing vocals

== Charts ==
Chart (2013)	Peak position
Belgian Albums (Ultratop Flanders)	120
Dutch Albums (Album Top 100)	80
