= Einstein on the Beach (For an Eggman) =

1994 single by Counting Crows

Single by Counting Crows

from the album DGC Rarities Volume 1
- Released: 1994
- Recorded: 1991
- Length: 3:56
- Label: Geffen
- Songwriters: Adam Duritz, David Bryson
- Producer: T Bone Burnett

Counting Crows singles chronology
"Round Here" (1994)	"Einstein on the Beach (For an Eggman)" (1994)	"Rain King" (1994)

"Einstein on the Beach (For an Eggman)" is a song by American rock band Counting Crows from the compilation album DGC Rarities Vol. 1. The title of the song was inspired by the Philip Glass opera Einstein on the Beach. The song became the band's first number-one song on the US Billboard Modern Rock Tracks chart, beating their previous highest-charting single, "Mr. Jones", which reached number two. Although the song charted only in the United States, it ranked at number 47 on the Australian Triple J Hottest 100 for 1994, one position above "Mr. Jones". The song was later included on Counting Crows' best-of compilation, Films About Ghosts (The Best Of...), in 2003.

== Background ==
According to Counting Crows frontman Adam Duritz, "Einstein on the Beach (For an Eggman)" was first recorded around 1991, shortly after the band first formed, as a home recording. He believed the song would have been ignored, so it was not included on the band's debut album, August and Everything After (1993).

The following year, however, when Geffen Records asked Duritz for a song to include on the rarities album DGC Rarities Volume 1 (1994), he allowed them to use "Einstein" on the compilation. Upon hearing it, the label saw the song as a hit, so it was serviced to radio stations and gained popularity, reaching number one on the Billboard Modern Rock Tracks chart for the week of August 13, 1994.

The success of "Einstein" caused Duritz dismay, however, as he was afraid the listeners of their songs would turn on them due to overexposure (citing fellow rock band Hootie & the Blowfish as an example), so the band scaled down their promotion and also refused to make a music video for their single "Rain King".

The message of "Einstein on the Beach (For an Eggman)" can be seen as the achievements that come about by accepting failure, although Duritz claimed the song was a facetious creation. In an interview with Songfacts, Duritz did admit the song had some meaning:

"It sort of takes the idea of, what if you're someone who's a brilliant mathematician like Albert Einstein or any of us doing creative work on something that seems so clean and brilliant, and then it turns out to be an atomic bomb. It's your idea, which is so amazing and graceful in and of itself, but it turns into something not so great."

Duritz also stated he liked the song, specifying its good harmony and the enthusiasm of his voice, and he still listens to it occasionally.

== Charts ==
=== Weekly charts ===
Chart (1994)	Peak position
US Radio Songs (Billboard)	45
US Alternative Airplay (Billboard)	1

=== Year-end charts ===
Chart (1994)	Position
US Modern Rock Tracks (Billboard)	10

== See also ==
- List of Billboard Modern Rock Tracks number ones of the 1990s
