= ITunes Live from SoHo (Counting Crows album) =

Live album by Counting Crows

iTunes Live from SoHo

Live album by Counting Crows
- Released: July 22, 2008
- Recorded: March 27, 2008
- Venues: Apple Store SoHo, New York City
- Genres: Alternative rock, folk rock, acoustic
- Length: 51:44
- Language: English
- Label: Geffen

Counting Crows chronology
Saturday Nights & Sunday Mornings (2008)	iTunes Live from SoHo (2008)	August and Everything After: Live at Town Hall (2011)

Professional ratings
Review scores
Source	Rating
AllMusic	review

iTunes Live from SoHo is a 2008 live album from American alternative rock band Counting Crows. The album is part of a series of live recordings by various musicians and bands at the Apple Store in New York City's SoHo neighborhood. Recorded in March 2008 while the band was touring and promoting their 2008 studio album Saturday Nights & Sunday Mornings, it is a digital exclusive on Apple's iTunes platform and streaming on Apple Music.

== Track listing ==
All tracks are written by Adam Duritz, unless otherwise indicated.

iTunes Live from SoHo track listing
No.	Title	Writer(s)	Length
1.	"Blues Run the Game"	Jackson C. Frank	4:11
2.	"Richard Manuel is Dead"	Duritz, Dan Vickrey, David Immerglück, Charles Gillingham, Matt Malley	4:36
3.	"Angels of the Silences"	Duritz, Gillingham	3:56
4.	"A Long December"		5:09
5.	"Washington Square"		4:47
6.	"On Almost Any Sunday Morning"		2:54
7.	"When I Dream of Michelangelo"	Duritz, Gillingham, Immerglück, Vickrey	3:38
8.	"You Can't Count on Me"		3:24
9.	"Le Ballet d'Or"	Duritz, Gillingham, Immerglück	5:01
10.	"On a Tuesday in Amsterdam Long Ago"	Duritz, Gillingham	4:37
11.	"Rain King"	Duritz, David Bryson	9:31
Total length:			51:44

== Personnel ==
Counting Crows

- Jim Bogios – drums, sleigh bells, tambourine, maracas, percussion, vocals
- David Bryson – guitar, vocals
- Adam Duritz – vocals
- Charlie Gillingham – keyboards, vocals
- David Immergluck – guitar, vocals
- Millard Powers – bass guitar, upright double bass, vocals
- Dan Vickrey – guitar, banjo, keyboard, vocals
