= Recovering the Satellites =

Studio album by Counting Crows
- Released: October 15, 1996
- Recorded: Winter 1996
- Studios: Unknown house (Hollywood Hills); Sunset Sound Factory (Hollywood); Capitol Studio B (Hollywood); Coast Recorders (San Francisco)
- Genre: Alternative rock
- Length: 59:28
- Label: Geffen
- Producer: Gil Norton

Counting Crows chronology
August and Everything After (1993)	Recovering the Satellites (1996)	Across a Wire: Live in New York City (1998)

Singles from Recovering the Satellites
- 1. "Angels of the Silences" Released: September 24, 1996; 2. "A Long December" Released: November 19, 1996; 3. "Daylight Fading" Released: May 19, 1997

Recovering the Satellites is the second studio album by American alternative rock band Counting Crows. It was released in the United States on October 15, 1996, three years after their debut album and following two years of worldwide touring. With producer Gil Norton, it features founding members Adam Duritz, David Bryson (guitar), Charlie Gillingham (keyboards), and Matt Malley (bass), as well as new additions Ben Mize (drums) and Dan Vickrey (guitars). Multi-instrumentalist and eventual band member David Immerglück played on the album as a session musician, as well.

Three singles were released, with "A Long December" being the best charting, peaking at number 6 on the US Radio Songs chart and number 1 in Canada.

The album reached No. 1 on the Billboard Hot 200 album chart in the US, No. 4 on the OOC album charts in the UK, and No. 7 on the ARIA charts in Australia. It has been certified double-platinum in both the US and Canada, and well as gold in the UK, Australia, and New Zealand. It received generally positive reviews.

== Recording and release ==
As with their debut, August and Everything After, the band recorded the album with Norton by renting a large house and using the acoustics of the space for unique sounds. Marvin Etzioni produced the album's eighth track, "Miller's Angels".

Duritz recorded two songs for the album on piano with friends from the Soul Rebels Brass Band playing horns that were ultimately cut: "Chelsea" and "Good Luck". He has said that he could not figure out how to sequence the songs with the rest of the album.

"Chelsea" was eventually released as a bonus track on the live double album Across a Wire: Live in New York City. "Good Luck" was presumed lost for several years until in the early 2020s. Geffen Records were contacted by filmmakers making a documentary on the band for HBO, covering the period between August and Everything After and Recovering the Satellites, for music and archive information. Original masters of the recordings, once thought lost in the 2008 Universal Studios fire, and video performances were provided by the label, including "Good Luck".

== Reception ==
Professional ratings
Review scores
Source	Rating
AllMusic	4/5 stars
Entertainment Weekly	C
Los Angeles Times	2.5/4 stars
MusicHound Rock	4/5 stars
Q	4/5 stars
Rolling Stone	4/5 stars
The Rolling Stone Album Guide	2/5 stars
Spin	6/10

Writing for Rolling Stone, Anthony DeCurtis gave the album four out of five stars. He said that the band's second album develops the sounds of August and Everything After and that they "largely achieve their serious ambitions". He praised Adam Duritz's lyrics and called the album "deeply satisfying". Andy Gill from The Independent gave the album a more negative review. He criticized Duritz's song-writing as "self-pity[ing]" and called him a "classic solipsistic soul-barer, he just won't shut up about himself". He called the album "bland" with "obvious" influences (including R.E.M., Bruce Springsteen and Lynyrd Skynyrd). Gill had some praise for producer Gil Norton's work on the album.

In a review for Entertainment Weekly, Ken Tucker also had negative feelings about the album, and gave it a "C" grade. He criticized Duritz's "yowling" and "moans" and called Counting Crows a "pastiche of its influences". The Los Angeles Times concluded that "there are precious few of the killer pop hooks that made such songs as 'Mr. Jones' and ''Round Here' irresistible despite their lack of originality."

In a review for AllMusic, Stephen Thomas Erlewine called the album a "self-consciously challenging response" to their successful debut album. He described the songs as "slightly more somber" than those on the first album but "more affecting". He noted an occasional "pretentiousness" on the album but praised "A Long December" as particularly articulate.

== Track listing ==
All tracks are written by Adam Duritz, with additional writers noted.

No.	Title	Writer(s)	Length
1.	"Catapult"	David Bryson; Charlie Gillingham; Matt Malley; Dan Vickrey; Ben Mize	3:34
2.	"Angels of the Silences"	Gillingham	3:39
3.	"Daylight Fading"	Gillingham; Vickrey	3:50
4.	"I'm Not Sleeping"	Bryson; Gillingham; Malley; Vickrey; Mize	4:57
5.	"Goodnight Elisabeth"		5:20
6.	"Children in Bloom"		5:23
7.	"Have You Seen Me Lately?"		4:08
8.	"Miller's Angels"	Vickrey	6:33
9.	"Another Horsedreamer's Blues"		4:32
10.	"Recovering the Satellites"		5:24
11.	"Monkey"		3:02
12.	"Mercury"		2:48
13.	"A Long December"		4:57
14.	"Walkaways"	Vickrey	1:12

== Personnel ==
=== Counting Crows ===
- Adam Duritz – lead vocals, piano, Wurlitzer, tambourine
- Charlie Gillingham – Hammond B-3, piano, Mellotron, Wurlitzer, accordion, harmonica, backing vocals
- David Bryson – guitars, Dobro, tambourine, backing vocals
- Dan Vickrey – guitars, backing vocals
- Matt Malley – electric bass guitar, double bass, backing vocals
- Ben Mize – drums, tambourine, light bulbs, Zippo lighter, backing vocals

==== Additional musicians ====
- Paul Buckmaster – orchestra conductor (3, 4, 9)
- Charlie Gillingham – string arrangements (3, 4, 9)
- David Immerglück – pedal steel guitar (8), octave mandolin (8)
- Marvin Etzioni – mandolin (12)

=== Technical ===
- Produced by Gil Norton (1–7, 9–14) and Marvin Etzioni (8)
- Recorded by Bradley Cook (1–7, 9–14) and David Vaught (8)
- Mixed by Michael Barbiero
- Programming – Mark Phythian
- Assistant engineer – Sevon Smokes Wright
- Second engineers – S. Husky Höskulds, Rail Rogut, Jay Ryan, Andy Taub
- Project coordinator – Janette Sheridan
- Creative direction – Robin Sloane
- Cover photography – Sarah Moon
- Photography – Chris Strother
- Art direction – Bill Merryfield and Robin Sloane
- Design – Bill Merryfield
- A&R – Tony Berg and Gary Gersh
- Management – Steven Jensen and Martin Kirkup

== Charts ==
=== Weekly charts ===
Chart (1996–1997)	Peak position
Australian Albums (ARIA)	7
Belgian Albums (Ultratop Flanders)	21
Belgian Albums (Ultratop Wallonia)	28
Canadian Albums (Billboard)	19
Dutch Albums (Album Top 100)	54
European Albums (European Top 100 Albums)	14
German Albums (Offizielle Top 100)	40
New Zealand Albums (RMNZ)	4
Norwegian Albums (VG-lista)	20
Scottish Albums (Official Charts)	6
Swedish Albums (Sverigetopplistan)	6
Swiss Albums (Schweizer Hitparade)	22
UK Albums (Official Charts)	4
US Billboard 200	1

=== Year-end charts ===
Chart (1997)	Position
Canadian Albums (Nielsen Soundscan)	93
US Billboard 200	35

== Certifications ==
Region	Certification	Certified units/sales
Australia (ARIA)	Gold	35,000^{^}
Canada (Music Canada)	2× Platinum	200,000^{^}
New Zealand (RMNZ)	Gold	7,500^{^}
United Kingdom (BPI)	Gold	100,000^{^}
United States (RIAA)	2× Platinum	2,000,000^{^}
^{^} Shipments figures based on certification alone.
