= Holiday In Spain =

Holiday in Spain can refer to:

- Holiday in Spain (album), a 1999 music album by Machine Translations
- "Holiday in Spain" (song), a 2004 song by Counting Crows and Bløf
- Scent of Mystery, a 1960 mystery film that featured the one and only use of Smell-O-Vision, later retitled as Holiday in Spain
- Public holidays in Spain
