= Toby Hawkins =

Toby Hawkins may refer to:

- Toby Hawkins (musician) on August and Everything After
- Toby Hawkins, character in Humans (TV series)
