= Hanginaround =

1999 single by Counting Crows

Single by Counting Crows

from the album This Desert Life
- B-side: "A Long December"
- Released: September 28, 1999
- Length: 4:16
- Label: DGC
- Songwriters: David Bryson; Adam Duritz; Charlie Gillingham; Matt Malley; Ben Mize; Dan Vickrey
- Producers: David Lowery, Dennis Herring

Counting Crows singles chronology
"Daylight Fading" (1997)	"Hanginaround" (1999)	"Mrs. Potter's Lullaby" (2000)

"Hanginaround" is a song by American rock band Counting Crows. It is the first track on their third album, This Desert Life (1999). It was serviced to US radio on September 28, 1999, as the album's lead single. It reached number 28 on the US Billboard Hot 100, becoming their biggest hit on the chart from this album. It also reached number one on the Billboard Triple-A chart, their second number-one single on this listing.

Outside the United States, "Hanginaround" became the band's fifth top-10 single in Canada, reaching number three on the RPM 100 Hit Tracks chart, and peaked within the top 50 in Ireland, New Zealand, and the United Kingdom. In April 2022, American Songwriter ranked the song at number nine on their list of "The Top 10 Counting Crows Songs".

== Background ==
As with on much of the This Desert Life album, Hanginaround saw the band experimenting with different recording techniques - in this case, utilizing looping. The song consists of eight different piano loops arranged in various configurations in setup inspired by Brian Wilson's Smile project. According to Counting Crows fansite anna-begins.com, Duritz says:

So I was sort of ... semi-celebratory about that but also [thinking] 'Where am I going?' It's about a wild time when I was growing' up. Living a bit of a wild life, celebrating that. It's also about being scared that you don't have a future, but I don't think that's a waste. In the end, the guy just decides to continue having fun and to worry about it later.

In an interview with Songfacts, Adam Duritz summed up his thought process behind the lyrics by stating "The idea of a song created with loops made me think of being on a loop myself. I wrote that song about when I was younger and the latter years in Berkeley and how I loved it there, but I was kind of going nowhere."

== Music video ==
The music video for the song shows the band performing the song in a living room of a house surrounded by a large crowd (which includes actress Meredith Salenger), as well as Adam Duritz waiting at a bus stop on a clear, colorful day. Throughout the video, the scene changes constantly, from people walking by (including one woman naked with her exposed areas blurred) to a construction crew removing the bench and replacing it with a bus canopy they built, to the other band members performing with Adam. At the end, a woman walks up to the canopy and sits next to Adam. After he glances at her necklace, a bus pulls up. Many others board it first, and as the woman is about to do so, she asks Adam to ride with her. He agrees, and gets on. The video ends with the crowd in the living room applauding the performance, and the bus (with posters of the band's "This Desert Life" album cover on the back of it) driving away from the stop.

== Track listings ==
US 7-inch single

A. "Hanginaround"
B. "A Long December"

UK CD single

1. "Hanginaround" (CD version)
2. "Baby, I'm a Big Star Now"
3. "Omaha" (live)

European CD single

1. "Hanginaround" – 4:12
2. "Mercury" – 8:17
3. "Goodnight Elisabeth" (live) – 6:44

== Charts ==
=== Weekly charts ===
Chart (1999–2000)	Peak position
Canada Top Singles (RPM)	3
Canada Adult Contemporary (RPM)	70
Canada Rock/Alternative (RPM)	2
Netherlands (Single Top 100)	87
New Zealand (Recorded Music NZ)	38
Scottish Singles Sales (Official Charts)	42
UK Singles (Official Charts)	46
US Billboard Hot 100	28
US Adult Alternative Airplay (Billboard)	1
US Adult Pop Airplay (Billboard)	5
US Alternative Airplay (Billboard)	17
US Mainstream Rock (Billboard)	37
US Pop Airplay (Billboard)	21

Chart (2004)	Peak position
Ireland (IRMA)	39
Scottish Singles Sales (Official Charts)	61
UK Singles (Official Charts)	68

=== Year-end charts ===
Chart (1999)	Position
Canada Top Singles (RPM)	84
Canada Rock/Alternative (RPM)	39
US Adult Top 40 (Billboard)	99
US Triple-A (Billboard)	39

Chart (2000)	Position
US Adult Top 40 (Billboard)	20
US Mainstream Top 40 (Billboard)	78
US Modern Rock Tracks (Billboard)	82
US Triple-A (Billboard)	13

== Release history ==
Region	Date	Format(s)	Label(s)	Ref.
United States	September 28, 1999	Mainstream rock; active rock radio	DGC	
United States	October 4, 1999	Hot adult contemporary radio	DGC	
United Kingdom	October 18, 1999	CD	Geffen	
United States	October 19, 1999	Contemporary hit radio	DGC	
United Kingdom (re-release)	March 15, 2004	CD	Geffen	
