= A Long December =

1996 single by Counting Crows

Single by Counting Crows

from the album Recovering the Satellites
- Released: November 19, 1996
- Recorded: Early 1996
- Studio: The Sound Factory (Hollywood, California)
- Genre: Alternative rock
- Length: 4:57
- Label: DGC; Geffen
- Songwriter: Adam F. Duritz
- Producer: Gil Norton

Counting Crows singles chronology
"Angels of the Silences" (1996)	"A Long December" (1996)	"Daylight Fading" (1997)

Music video
- "A Long December" on YouTube

"A Long December" is a song by American rock band Counting Crows. The ballad is the second single and 13th track from their second album, Recovering the Satellites (1996). Lead singer Adam Duritz was inspired to write the track after his friend was hit by a motorist and injured, making the song about reflecting on tragedy with a positive disposition. The song was serviced to US radio in November 1996 and was released commercially on December 2 in the United Kingdom.

"A Long December" peaked at number six on the US Billboard Hot 100 Airplay chart and at number one on the Canadian RPM 100 Hit Tracks chart, becoming the band's second number-one single in Canada. In December 1997, the song was re-released in the UK and reached number 68, six places below its original peak of number 62. American Songwriter magazine named "A Long December" the Counting Crows' greatest song.

== Background and composition ==
In an interview with Rolling Stone magazine, lead singer Adam Duritz explained that he was inspired to write "A Long December" after one of his friends had been hit by a motorist and was injured. While the song is a reflection on tragedy, it also possesses an optimistic tone. According to Duritz, the song is about "looking back on your life and seeing changes happening" while simultaneously looking forward to positive change in the future.

"A Long December" is an alternative rock ballad. The track is composed in the key of F major and written in common time, with a tempo of 72 beats per minute. Speaking of "A Long December" in a 2025 interview, Duritz said, "I knew that was the best thing I'd ever written when I wrote it. I knew it was a perfect song, and I knew I was going to love playing it forever."

== Chart performance ==
In the United States, "A Long December" was ineligible to chart on the Billboard Hot 100 since it was never released as a physical single there, which was a rule at the time. The song instead appeared on the Hot 100 Airplay chart, where it peaked at number six in February 1997 and spent 29 weeks on the chart. On other Billboard rankings, the song entered the top 10 on five of them, reaching number one on the Triple-A chart for two weeks. In Canada, the song became a number-one hit for two weeks and was the seventh-most-successful song of 1997. It was Counting Crows' second Canadian chart-topper, after "Mr. Jones" in 1994. On the UK Singles Chart, "A Long December" charted twice, peaking at number 62 during its original run in December 1996 and re-entering the listing at number 68 one year later. The single also charted in the Netherlands, reaching number 68, and in Australia, peaking at number 86.

== Music video ==
Lawrence Carroll directed the music video for "A Long December", which features American actress Courteney Cox, whom Duritz was dating at the time. Filmed in Hollywood, California, the video was produced by Victoria Vallas. The clip was first added to MTV, VH1, and The Box on the week ending December 1, 1996. The video, which evokes a somber mood with its images of snow and dull colors, features Duritz playing a piano in the woods and Cox writing a letter in a dark room. Shown throughout the video are scenes of a chalkboard with dates written on it and Counting Crows playing their instruments. Cox eventually leaves the building she is in and walks to a bus stop, clutching her note. Niko Stratis of Spin magazine called the video "perfect".

== Track listings ==
All songs were written by Duritz except where noted. All live tracks were recorded at Elysée Montmartre (Paris, France) on December 9, 1994.

UK CD1; Australian and Japanese CD single

1. "A Long December" (LP version)
2. "Ghost Train" (live)
3. "Sullivan Street" (live) (Duritz, David Bryson)

UK CD2

1. "A Long December" – 4:55
2. "A Murder of One" (live) (Duritz, Bryson, Matt Malley) – 14:57

European CD single

1. "A Long December" (LP version)
2. "Ghost Train" (live)

== Credits and personnel ==
Credits are lifted from the Recovering the Satellites booklet.

Studios

- Recorded in early 1996 at The Sound Factory (Hollywood, California)
- Mixed at River Sound (New York City)
- Mastered at Gateway Mastering (Portland, Maine, US)

Counting Crows

- Adam F. Duritz – words, music, vocals, piano, Wurlitzer, tambourine
- David Bryson – guitars, Dobro, tambourine, vocals
- Dan Vickrey – guitars, vocals
- Matt Malley – electric bass guitar, double bass, vocals
- Charles Gillingham – Hammond B-3, piano, Mellotron, Wurlitzer, accordion, vocals
- Ben Mize – drums, tambourine, vocals

Other personnel

- Gil Norton – production
- Bradley Cook – recording
- Michael Barbiero – mixing
- Mark Phythian – programming
- Sevon Smokes Wright – assistant engineering
- Bob Ludwig – mastering

== Charts ==
=== Weekly charts ===
Chart (1996–1998)	Peak position
Australia (ARIA)	86
Canada Top Singles (RPM)	1
Canada Adult Contemporary (RPM)	23
Canada Rock/Alternative (RPM)	17
European Radio (Music & Media)	38
European Alternative Rock Radio (Music & Media)	12
Netherlands (Dutch Top 40 Tipparade)	12
Netherlands (Single Top 100)	68
Poland Airplay (Music & Media)	15
Scottish Singles Sales (Official Charts)	59
Spain Airplay (Music & Media)	9
UK Singles (Official Charts)	62
US Radio Songs (Billboard)	6
US Adult Alternative Airplay (Billboard)	1
US Adult Pop Airplay (Billboard)	6
US Alternative Airplay (Billboard)	5
US Mainstream Rock (Billboard)	9
US Pop Airplay (Billboard)	7

=== Year-end charts ===
Chart (1996)	Position
Brazil (Crowley)	57

Chart (1997)	Position
Canada Top Singles (RPM)	7
US Hot 100 Airplay (Billboard)	29
US Adult Top 40 (Billboard)	23
US Mainstream Rock Tracks (Billboard)	44
US Modern Rock Tracks (Billboard)	30
US Top 40/Mainstream (Billboard)	33
US Triple A (Billboard)	6

== Release history ==
Region	Date	Format(s)	Label(s)	Ref.
United States	November 19, 1996	Contemporary hit radio	DGC	
United Kingdom	December 2, 1996	CD; cassette	Geffen	
Japan	December 18, 1996	CD	Geffen	
United Kingdom (re-release)	December 8, 1997	CD	Geffen	

== In popular culture ==
The song was used in the 2026 film Teenage Sex and Death at Camp Miasma where the serial killer Little Death murders a group of camp counsellors in a long sequence arranged to this song and filmed mostly in an unbroken take.
