= Martin Kirkup =

British-born music industry executive (1948–2024)

- Born: 1948; Tynemouth, Northumberland, England
- Died: February 4, 2024 (aged 75); Hawaii, U.S.
- Citizenship: American
- Education: University of Leicester
- Occupation: Artist manager (music)
- Employer: Direct Management Group
- Organization(s): NARAS, BAFTA
- Website: www.directmanagement.com

Martin Kirkup (1948 – February 4, 2024) was a British-born American music industry executive. He was a founding partner of the Los Angeles-based Direct Management Group. Over the course of his career, Kirkup has worked with artists including Katy Perry, Adam Lambert, k.d. lang, Counting Crows, The B-52s, Echo and the Bunnymen, and Orchestral Manoeuvres in the Dark.

== Early life and education ==
Kirkup was born and grew up in Tynemouth, Northumberland. He attended the University of Leicester, and came to the United States in 1973 as a visiting professor at the University of Rhode Island. He later moved to New York, where he began his career in the music industry in the publicity department at Elektra Records.

== Career ==
Kirkup was hired by A&M Records in 1975 as director of creative services. He moved to Los Angeles in 1978, and was named vice president of artist development, overseeing campaigns for the artists on A&M's roster, which at the time included Peter Frampton, Nils Lofgren, Supertramp, Squeeze, The Tubes, Bryan Adams, Joe Jackson, The Police and Joan Armatrading.

In 1984, he founded Direct Management with Steve Jensen, who was previously a booking agent. Kirkup and Jensen's first clients were Boy Meets Girl and Nell Carter. Their first significant success was with Orchestral Manoeuvres in the Dark; they placed "If You Leave" on the Pretty in Pink soundtrack, and the song became a Top 5 hit on the Billboard Top 100. While the band previously had hits in Europe, the album which followed the Pretty in Pink soundtrack, The Pacific Age, was their first American gold album.

Bryan Ferry was signed in 1988 Echo and the Bunnymen were signed in 1986, and in 1989 Kirkup and Jensen began working with The B-52's, reformed after the death of guitarist Ricky Wilson. Their first release as a Direct client, Cosmic Thing included the hit singles "Roam" and "Love Shack" and more than 5 million copies of the album were sold. Kirkup and Jenson were credited for "steering (the B-52s) into a major comeback."

In 1992 Kirkup and Jensen signed Counting Crows; their debut, August and Everything After, sold in excess of 10 million albums. Direct worked with the band until 2001. They have managed Lang since signing her in 2000.

Bradford Cobb joined Direct in 1997, and in 2004, he met Katy Perry and producer Glen Ballard. She was signed by Direct shortly thereafter. The first single from the debut Katy Perry album, One of the Boys, I Kissed a Girl", became her first Billboard Hot 100. Her next album, Teenage Dream became the first album by a female artist to produce five number-one Billboard Hot 100 singles As of 2018, Perry had sold more than 100 million records.

Direct also manages AU/RA. The company managed Adam Lambert from 2011 until 2017.

== Death ==
Kirkup died in Hawaii on February 4, 2024, at the age of 75.
