= Steve Bowman =

American rock drummer and songwriter (born 1967)

- Born: January 14, 1967 (age 59)
- Genres: Rock
- Occupations: Musician; songwriter
- Instrument: Drums
- Website: www.mumulab.org

Steve Bowman (born January 14, 1967) is an American rock drummer and songwriter. He was a founding member and drummer for Counting Crows during the recording and period of time following their debut album, August and Everything After (1993). The band's unexpected success led them to performances on Late Night with David Letterman and Saturday Night Live. They toured with The Rolling Stones, were nominated for two Grammy Awards and won an American Music Award. By 1994, they were also on the cover of Rolling Stone magazine.

Bowman, as explained by Adam Duritz, was "kicked out" of Counting Crows in late 1994. In the next few years, he went on to play with Third Eye Blind, John Wesley Harding and Penelope Houston. In 1998, Bowman and his new band Luce recorded the song "Good Day", which was featured in the films How to Lose a Guy in 10 Days (2003) and 13 Going on 30 (2004). Bowman also played on Luce's second record which produced the single "Buy a Dog".

Bowman is active as a session musician, has released a book on drumming called Groove Control, contributes freelance articles to various music magazines, and runs a private teaching studio just outside Nashville called Murfreesboro Music Lab.

As of 2022, Bowman had created a studio called Murfreesboro Music Lab and started a podcast called Letters to an Aspiring Musician, to help other musicians.
