= A Murder of One =

1995 Counting Crows single

Single by Counting Crows

from the album August and Everything After
- Released: 1995
- Genre: Rock
- Length: 5:44
- Label: Geffen
- Songwriters: David Bryson, Adam Duritz, Matt Malley
- Producer: T-Bone Burnett

Counting Crows singles chronology
"Rain King" (1995)	"A Murder of One" (1995)	"Angels of the Silences" (1996)

"A Murder of One" is a song by Counting Crows, released as the fourth single from their debut album, August and Everything After (1993).

Frontman Adam Duritz explained the song's meaning as follows: "I can remember being eight years old and having infinite possibilities. But life ends up being so much less than we thought it would be when we were kids, with relationships that are so empty and stupid and brutal. If you don't find a way to break the chain and change in some way, then you wind up, as the rhyme goes: a murder of one, for sorrow." "Murder" is a term used to refer to a group of crows. The band's name, Counting Crows, and a line from this song are both references to an English divination rhyme that came from an old superstition.

The music was created by Adam Duritz, Matt Malley, and David Bryson.

The song was featured in a 2004 episode of Scrubs, entitled "My Porcelain God". The song was also featured in a season 3 episode of The Bear, entitled "Apologies".
