= August and Everything After =

Studio album by Counting Crows
- Released: September 14, 1993
- Recorded: February−June 1993
- Studios: Counting Crows' house (Los Angeles); Kiva West (Encino); Conway Recording Studios (Hollywood); Village Recorders (Los Angeles); Sunset Sound (Hollywood)
- Genres: Alternative rock; country rock; roots rock
- Length: 51:42
- Label: DGC
- Producer: T Bone Burnett

Counting Crows chronology
August and Everything After (1993)	Recovering the Satellites (1996)

Singles from August and Everything After
- 1. "Mr. Jones" Released: December 1, 1993; 2. "Round Here" Released: May 23, 1994; 3. "Rain King" Released: October 3, 1994; 4. "A Murder of One" Released: 1995

August and Everything After is the debut studio album by American rock band Counting Crows, released September 14, 1993, via DGC Records. The album was produced by T Bone Burnett and featured the founding members of the band: Steve Bowman (drums), David Bryson (guitar), Adam Duritz (vocals), Charlie Gillingham (keyboards) and Matt Malley (bass). Session musicians used for the album were multi-instrumentalist David Immerglück (who later joined the band as a full-time member in 1999) and Burnett (who also provided additional guitar work).

Four singles were released from the album, with the highest charting being "Mr. Jones", which peaked at number 5 on the Billboard US Radio Songs Chart and number 2 on several genre-specific Billboard charts. The album was well received by critics and has gone multi-platinum in several countries, including the U.S. where it has sold over seven million copies, and peaked at number 4 on the Billboard 200 album chart.

The album cover depicts handwritten lyrics to the titular song, but the band decided against featuring the song on the album. It was not until over a decade later that it was played as part of one of their live concerts. The song "August and Everything After" was released on January 24, 2019, as an Amazon Original.

On September 18, 2007, a two-disc deluxe edition of the album was issued. The first disc contains the original album, remastered by Adam Ayan at Gateway Mastering, with six demos added as bonus tracks. The second disc is taken from the band's penultimate performance during the August tour, recorded at Élysée Montmartre in Paris, France, on December 9, 1994.

The album August and Everything After: Live at Town Hall was released on August 29, 2011, featuring live recordings of the songs from this album. More than six million copies of the album have been sold by February 2002 in the US.

== Critical reception ==
Professional ratings
Initial reviews (in 1993/1994)
Review scores
Source	Rating
Calgary Herald	B
Entertainment Weekly	D
NME	6/10
Rolling Stone	4/5 stars
Select	3/5 medals
The Village Voice	B−

Professional ratings
Retrospective reviews (after 1993/1994)
Review scores
Source	Rating
AllMusic	4/5 stars
The Encyclopedia of Popular Music	5/5 stars
MusicHound Rock	5/5 stars
The Rolling Stone Album Guide	3.5/5 stars
Uncut	4/5 stars

The Washington Post wrote: "Enlisting accordions, mandolin, pedal steel, and harmonica to flavor the usual rock instrumentation, the Crows play transliterated Celtic rock not unlike The Hooters. Such music seems to require a sense of self importance, and the quintet is not lacking".

Rolling Stone placed the album at number 67 on its list of the 100 Best Albums of the '90s, published in October 2019.

== Track listing ==
=== Original release ===
All tracks are written by Adam Duritz, except where noted.

No.	Title	Writer(s)	Length
1.	"Round Here"	Duritz; David Bryson; Dave Janusko; Dan Jewett; Chris Roldan	5:32
2.	"Omaha"		3:40
3.	"Mr. Jones"	Duritz; Bryson	4:33
4.	"Perfect Blue Buildings"		5:01
5.	"Anna Begins"	Duritz; Bryson; Marty Jones; Toby Hawkins; Lydia Holly	4:32
6.	"Time and Time Again"	Duritz; Bryson; Charlie Gillingham; Steve Bowman; Don Dixon	5:13
7.	"Rain King"	Duritz; Bryson	4:16
8.	"Sullivan Street"	Duritz; Bryson	4:29
9.	"Ghost Train"		4:01
10.	"Raining in Baltimore"		4:41
11.	"A Murder of One"	Duritz; Bryson; Matt Malley	5:44

=== 2007 deluxe edition ===
Additional tracks (produced by David Bryson)
No.	Title	Writer(s)	Length
12.	"Shallow Days" (Acoustic Demo)	Duritz; Bryson; Jones; Hawkins; Holly	4:50
13.	"Mean Jumper Blues" (Acoustic Demo)	Blind Lemon Jefferson	4:24
14.	"Love and Addiction" (Demo)	Duritz; Bryson Jones; Hawkins; Holly	4:21
15.	"Omaha" (Demo)		3:18
16.	"Shallow Days" (Demo)	Duritz; Bryson; Jones; Hawkins; Holly	4:41
17.	"This Land Is Your Land" (Acoustic Demo)	Woody Guthrie	3:44

Bonus disc (Live at Élysée Montmartre, Paris, France, December 9, 1994)
No.	Title	Writer(s)	Length
1.	"Anna Begins"	Duritz; Bryson; Jones; Hawkins; Holly	5:21
2.	"Omaha"		3:43
3.	"Jumping Jesus"	Tom Barnes; Jim Gordon	3:01
4.	"Margery Dreams of Horses"	Duritz	4:13
5.	"Perfect Blue Buildings"		5:24
6.	"Round Here"	Duritz; Bryson; Janusko; Jewett; Roldan	11:45
7.	"Rain King"	Duritz; Bryson	4:49
8.	"Time and Time Again"	Duritz; Bryson; Gillingham; Bowman; Dixon	6:16
9.	"Ghost Train"		5:38
10.	"Children in Bloom"		5:27
11.	"A Murder of One"	Duritz; Bryson; Malley	14:42
12.	"Sullivan Street"	Duritz; Bryson	5:10
13.	"The Ghost in You"	Richard Butler; Tim Butler	3:36

== Personnel ==
=== Counting Crows ===
- Adam Duritz – lead vocals, piano, harmonica
- Charlie Gillingham – piano, Hammond B-3, accordion, Chamberlin, backing vocals
- David Bryson – guitars, backing vocals
- Matt Malley – bass, guitar, backing vocals
- Steve Bowman – drums, backing vocals

==== Additional personnel ====
- David Immerglück – guitars, mandolins, pedal steel guitar, mandocello, backing vocals
- Bill Dillon – guitar, guitorgan
- T Bone Burnett – guitar
- Denny Fongheiser – percussion, drums (3)
- Gary Louris – backing vocals
- Mark Olson – backing vocals
- Maria McKee – backing vocals

=== Technical ===
- Produced by T Bone Burnett
- Executive producer – Gary Gersh
- Recorded by Pat McCarthy
- Mixed by Scott Litt (1, 3, 6–8, 11) and Pat McCarthy (2, 4, 5, 9, 10)
- Second engineers – Brant Scott and Mark Guilbeault
- Additional engineers – Howard Willing, Robert Hart, Steve Holroyd, and Clark Germain
- Mastered by Stephen Marcussen at Precision Mastering (Los Angeles, CA)
- Creative direction – Robin Sloane
- Art direction – Larry Vigon
- Design – Larry Vigon and Brian Jackson
- Photography – Michael Tighe
- Management – Steven Jensen and Martin Kirkup

==== 2007 Deluxe Edition ====
- Mastered by Adam Ayan at Gateway Mastering (Portland, ME)

== Charts ==
=== Weekly charts ===
Chart (1993–1994)	Peak position
Australian Albums (ARIA)	12
Austrian Albums (Ö3 Austria)	24
Canada Top Albums/CD's (RPM)	1
Dutch Albums (Album Top 100)	58
European Albums (European Top 100 Albums)	37
German Albums (Offizielle Top 100)	56
New Zealand Albums (RMNZ)	12
Portuguese Albums (AFP)	10
Scottish Albums (Official Charts)	23
Spanish Albums (Promusicae)	8
Swedish Albums (Sverigetopplistan)	22
UK Albums (Official Charts)	16
US Billboard 200	4
US Cashbox Album Charts	1

Chart (2001)	Peak position.
Irish Albums (IRMA)	24

=== Year-end charts ===
Chart (1994)	Position
Australian Albums (ARIA)	29
Canada Top Albums/CDs (RPM)	3
European Top 100 Albums (Music & Media)	94
New Zealand Albums (RMNZ)	18
Spanish Albums (AFYVE)	30
US Billboard 200	5
UK Albums (OCC)	120

Chart (1995)	Position
US Billboard 200	63

=== Decade-end charts ===
Chart (1990–1999)	Position
US Billboard 200	66

== Certifications ==
Region	Certification	Certified units/sales
Australia (ARIA)	Platinum	70,000^{^}
Canada (Music Canada)	7× Platinum	831,000
Denmark (IFPI Danmark)	Platinum	20,000^{‡}
New Zealand (RMNZ)	Platinum	15,000^{^}
Spain (Promusicae)	Gold	50,000^{^}
United Kingdom (BPI)	Platinum	300,000^{^}
United States (RIAA)	7× Platinum	7,000,000^{^}
Summaries
Worldwide	—	10,000,000
^{^} Shipments figures based on certification alone.^{‡} Sales+streaming figures based on certification alone.
