= Rain King =

1994 single by Counting Crows

Single by Counting Crows

from the album August and Everything After
- B-side: "Anna Begins" (live)
- Released: October 3, 1994
- Length: 4:16
- Label: Geffen
- Songwriters: David Bryson; Adam Duritz
- Producer: T-Bone Burnett

Counting Crows singles chronology
"Einstein on the Beach (For an Eggman)" (1994)	"Rain King" (1994)	"A Murder of One" (1995)

"Rain King" is a single by the rock band Counting Crows. It was released in October 1994 by Geffen Records as the band's fourth single, and third single from their debut album, August and Everything After (1993). The title is a reference to Saul Bellow's Henderson the Rain King. "Rain King" peaked at number 66 on the US Billboard Hot 100 Airplay chart, number 18 in Canada, and number four in Iceland. In April 2022, American Songwriter ranked the song at number eight on their list of "The Top 10 Counting Crows Songs".

== Background ==
Adam Duritz said, about this song: "I read this book in college when I was at Berkeley called Henderson, the Rain King. And the main character in the book was kind of this big, open-wound of a person, Eugene Henderson, he just sort of bled all over everyone around him. For better or for worse, full of joy, full of sorrow, he just made a mess of everything. And when I wrote the song years later, it didn't really have anything to do with the book except the book had kind of become a totem for how I felt about creativity and writing–that it was just this thing where you just took everything inside of you and just sort of [funny noise] sprayed it all over everything, and not to worry too much about it. You try and craft it but not to be self-conscious about it, in any case. And, it's sort of a song about everything that goes into writing, all the feelings, everything that makes you want to write, makes you want to maybe pick up a guitar and do it, and express yourself because it's full of all the doubts and the fears about how I felt about my life at that time. And also the feeling that I really deserved something better than what I had accomplished up to that point. I think it *is* sort of a religious song about the sort of undefinable thing inside you or out there somewhere that makes you write, makes you create, makes you do any kind of art form, you know? And makes me the rain king, sort of."

== Track listings ==
- UK CD and cassette single; European CD single
1. "Rain King" (LP version) – 4:13
2. "Anna Begins" (recorded live for BBC Radio 1 on April 6, 1994) – 5:30
3. "Round Here" (recorded live for BBC Radio 1 on April 6, 1994) – 6:14
- Australian CD single
1. "Rain King" (LP version) – 4:16
2. "A Murder of One" (LP version) – 5:44
3. "Mr. Jones" (acoustic live from World Cafe) – 4:47

== Charts ==
=== Weekly charts ===
Chart (1994–1995)	Peak position
Canada Top Singles (RPM)	18
France Radio (SNEP)	87
Germany (GfK)	94
Iceland (Íslenski Listinn Topp 40)	4
Scottish Singles Sales (Official Charts)	33
UK Singles (Official Charts)	49
UK Rock & Metal (Official Charts)	5
UK Airplay (Music Week)	32
US Radio Songs (Billboard)	66
US Mainstream Rock (Billboard)	4
US Pop Airplay (Billboard)	31

=== Year-end charts ===
Chart (1994)	Position
Iceland (Íslenski Listinn Topp 40)	97
US Album Rock Tracks (Billboard)	37

== Release history ==
Region	Date	Format(s)	Label(s)	Ref.
United Kingdom	October 3, 1994	CD; cassette	Geffen	
Australia	April 24, 1995	CD	Geffen	
