= Mr. Jones (Counting Crows song) =

1993 single by Counting Crows

Single by Counting Crows

from the album August and Everything After
- B-side: "Raining in Baltimore" (LP version)
- Released: December 1, 1993
- Genre: Alternative rock; jangle pop; pop rock; folk-pop
- Length: 4:32
- Label: Geffen
- Songwriters: David Bryson; Adam Duritz
- Producer: T-Bone Burnett

Counting Crows singles chronology
"Mr. Jones" (1993)	"Round Here" (1994)

Music video
- "Mr. Jones" on YouTube

Audio sample
- Counting Crows – "Mr. Jones": file; help

"Mr. Jones" is a song by American rock band Counting Crows. It was released as their debut single in December 1993 by Geffen Records, serving as the lead single from their debut album, August and Everything After (1993). The song was written by band members David Bryson and Adam Duritz, and produced by T-Bone Burnett. It became the band's first radio hit and has been described as their breakout single.

"Mr. Jones" reached number five on the US Billboard Hot 100 Airplay chart. Internationally, the song peaked at number one in Canada and number seven in France. Its accompanying music video was directed by Charles Wittenmeier and filmed in New York City. It won two awards at the 1994 Billboard and MTV Music Video Awards. American Songwriter ranked the song at number four on their list of "The Top 10 Counting Crows Songs" in 2022.

== Background ==
The band's surprise success happened to coincide with Kurt Cobain's death. These events took a significant toll on Adam Duritz, the lead vocalist and principal songwriter. Duritz said in an interview, "We heard that, that [Cobain] had shot himself. And it really scared the hell out of me because I thought, these things in my life are getting so out of control." These events and feelings were the basis for "Catapult", the first track of Recovering the Satellites.

== Lyrics and performances ==
The song is about struggling musicians (Duritz and bassist Marty Jones of the Himalayans) who "want to be big stars", believing that "when everybody loves me, I will never be lonely". Duritz would later recant these values; and in some later concert appearances, "Mr. Jones" was played in a subdued acoustic style, if at all. On the live CD Across a Wire, Duritz changes the lyrics "We all wanna be big, big stars, but we got different reasons for that" to "We all wanna be big, big stars, but then we get second thoughts about that"; he also changed the lyrics "when everybody loves you, sometimes that's just about as funky as you can be" to "when everybody loves you, sometimes that's just about as fucked up as you can be."

Some believe the song is a veiled reference to the protagonist of Bob Dylan's "Ballad of a Thin Man", based on the lyric "I wanna be Bob Dylan, Mr. Jones wishes he was someone just a little more funky." According to Adam Duritz on VH1 Storytellers, "It's really a song about my friend Marty and I. We went out one night to watch his dad play, his dad was a Flamenco guitar player who lived in Spain (David Serva), and he was in San Francisco in the mission playing with his old Flamenco troupe. And after the gig we all went to this bar called the New Amsterdam in San Francisco on Columbus."

In a 2013 interview, Duritz explained that even though the song is named for his friend Marty Jones, it is actually about Duritz himself. "I wrote a song about me, I just happened to be out with him that night", Duritz said. The inspiration for the song came as Duritz and Jones were drunk at a bar after watching Jones' father perform, when they saw Kenney Dale Johnson, longtime drummer for the musician Chris Isaak, sitting with three women. "It just seemed like, you know, we couldn't even manage to talk to girls, ... we were just thinking if we were rock stars, it'd be easier. I went home and wrote the song", Duritz said.

In the live version of the song, as on the album Across a Wire: Live in New York City, the first couplet of the song is a quotation of the 1967 song "So You Want to Be a Rock 'n' Roll Star" by the Byrds. In that same live version Duritz ends the song by singing "Mr. Jones and me. We don't see each other much anymore."

== Production ==
"Mr. Jones" is the only song on the album August and Everything After where the drums are not played by Counting Crows drummer Steve Bowman. Bowman "hated the song," because he "didn't sign up to play country music" and "thinking that way, he played it that way and ruined it over and over again" says Duritz. Producer T-Bone Burnett brought in drummer Denny Fongheiser who "nailed the song in two takes" and is on the released version. Singer Duritz also struggled with the vocals for this song and "Rain King" which appears on the same album. Duritz "must have sang the song 100 times" in multiple studios before getting a good take.

== Reception ==
=== Critical ===
Larry Flick from Billboard magazine wrote, "Cut is lodged solidly at the top of the rock singles charts, and probably hasn't seen its peak there. Meanwhile, top 40 radio should give it a listen—the song's classic rock influences, punchy, pop-oriented production, and pleasant sing-along chorus would round out many a pop roster." Mark Tremblay from Calgary Herald found that "they're best uptempo, especially when they parade their youthful naivete" as in "Mr. Jones". British music and entertainment retailer HMV named the song Single of the Week in the last week of April 1994. Alan Jones from Music Week gave it three out of five, saying, "From what is arguably the finest debut album of 1994 comes this, Counting Crows' first single, a vibrant and melodic song. An acoustic version of the song is added here as a bonus track. Perfection." Pan-European magazine Music & Media wrote, "No, it's not the Talking Heads song from 1988. An outtake of the Tragically Hip's Up to Here sessions is more like it. Good stuff for 'April and everything after!'"

Head of music on Swedish radio station City 107/Malmö, Lars Bodin, particularly liked "those harmonies like CSNY and the Eagles used to do. I like to hear this slightly rougher version of that typical American group sound again. Twice a day is our advice!" In their review of the album, Music & Media named it "the most poppy track", noting that it "is already an alternative fave, because of its "Eddie Vedder meets the Tragically Hip" angst factor." Stuart Bailie from NME said, "On 'Mr. Jones', Adam Duritz sings, I want to be a lion/Everybody wants to pass as cats, and you're on his side, even if the music and the tortured scrawl of a voice suggest that lionisation may be a long way off." NME editor Johnny Cigarettes felt the first lines of the song "are Sha la la la la in a please-let-me-be-reincarnated-as-Van-Morrison voice." He viewed it as "an inoffensive folk-pop tune that trundles along without the obscene diversions into Hothouse Flowers hell that you half expect." Clark Collis from Select wrote that "re-writing Dylan" with "Mr. Jones", "the San Franciscan five-piece plot a steady bitter-sweet course between the clashing rocks of country-rock and braindead MOR."

=== Commercial ===
"Mr. Jones" debuted on the US Billboard Hot 100 Airplay chart on January 22, 1994. On May 14, 1994, the song reached its peak US chart position at number five.

=== Legacy ===
According to Duritz, the song title had a hand in the naming by Jonathan Pontell of "Generation Jones", the group of people born between 1954 and 1965. "I feel honored that my song Mr. Jones was part of the inspiration for the name 'Generation Jones'."

== Music video ==
The music video for "Mr. Jones" was directed by Charles Wittenmeier, produced by Phyllis Koenig and filmed in New Amsterdam, New York City. It won the band an award for Best New Artist at the 1994 MTV Video Music Awards. At the 1994 Billboard Music Video Awards, it won an award for Best New Artist Clip of the Year in the category for Rock and was nominated for Maximum Impact Clip of the Year. The video was later made available remastered in HD on Counting Crows' official YouTube channel in 2009, having generated more than 412 million views as of October 2026.

== Accolades ==
Year	Association	Category	Result
1994	Billboard Video Music Awards	Best New Rock Artist Clip of the Year	Won
1994	MTV Video Music Awards	Best New Artist	Won

== Track listings ==
- Australian CD single
- UK 7-inch and cassette single
1. "Mr. Jones" (LP version) – 4:31
2. "Raining in Baltimore" (LP version) – 4:38
3. "Mr. Jones" (acoustic live recording from World Cafe) – 4:42
- UK CD single
1. "Mr. Jones" (LP version) – 4:31
2. "Raining in Baltimore" (LP version) – 4:38
3. "Mr. Jones" (acoustic live recording from World Cafe) – 4:42
4. "Rain King" (acoustic live recording from World Cafe) – 5:10
- French CD single
1. "Mr. Jones" (LP version) – 4:31
2. "Mr. Jones" (acoustic live recording from World Cafe) – 4:42

== Personnel ==
Personnel are taken from AllMusic.

- Composers – David Bryson, Adam Duritz
- Performed by – Counting Crows
- Producers – T-Bone Burnett, Bruce Ranes
- Executive producer – Gary Gersh
- Mixing – Scott Litt, Patrick McCarthy
- Engineers – Patrick McCarthy, Bruce Ranes
- Photography – Michael Tighe

== Charts ==
=== Weekly charts ===
Chart (1993–1994)	Peak position
Australia (ARIA)	13
Austria (Ö3 Austria Top 40)	27
Belgium (Ultratop 50 Flanders)	45
Canada Contemporary Album Radio (The Record)	1
Canada Top Singles (RPM)	1
Europe (Eurochart Hot 100)	49
Europe (European Hit Radio)	18
Europe (European AC Radio Top 25)	21
France (SNEP)	7
France Airplay (Music & Media)	11
Iceland (Íslenski Listinn Topp 40)	10
Italy (Musica e dischi)	22
Lithuania (M-1)	9
Netherlands (Dutch Top 40 Tipparade)	14
Netherlands (Single Top 100)	42
New Zealand (Recorded Music NZ)	49
Peru (UPI)	5
Quebec (ADISQ)	5
Scottish Singles Sales (Official Charts)	77
Spain Airplay (Music & Media)	1
UK Singles (Official Charts)	28
UK Airplay (Music Week)	32
US Radio Songs (Billboard)	5
US Adult Contemporary (Billboard)	25
US Alternative Airplay (Billboard)	2
US Mainstream Rock (Billboard)	2
US Pop Airplay (Billboard)	2

Chart (2012)	Peak position
Ireland (IRMA)	75

=== Year-end charts ===
Chart (1994)	Position
Australia (ARIA)	80
Brazil (Mais Tocadas)	66
Canada Top Singles (RPM)	5
France (SNEP)	39
Iceland (Íslenski Listinn Topp 40)	50
Spain Airplay (Music & Media)	6
US Hot 100 Airplay (Billboard)	7
US Album Rock Tracks (Billboard)	11
US Modern Rock Tracks (Billboard)	31

== Certifications ==
Region	Certification	Certified units/sales
Brazil (Pro-Música Brasil)	Gold	30,000^{‡}
Denmark (IFPI Danmark)	Gold	45,000^{‡}
Italy (FIMI)	Gold	25,000^{‡}
New Zealand (RMNZ)	6× Platinum	180,000^{‡}
Spain (Promusicae)	Platinum	60,000^{‡}
United Kingdom (BPI)	Platinum	600,000^{‡}
^{‡} Sales+streaming figures based on certification alone.

== Release history ==
Region	Date	Format(s)	Label(s)	Ref.
Europe	December 1, 1993	CD	Geffen	
Australia	February 28, 1994	CD	Geffen	
Australia	March 28, 1994	Cassette	Geffen	
United Kingdom	April 18, 1994	7-inch vinyl; CD; cassette	Geffen	
