= Counting Crows =

American rock band

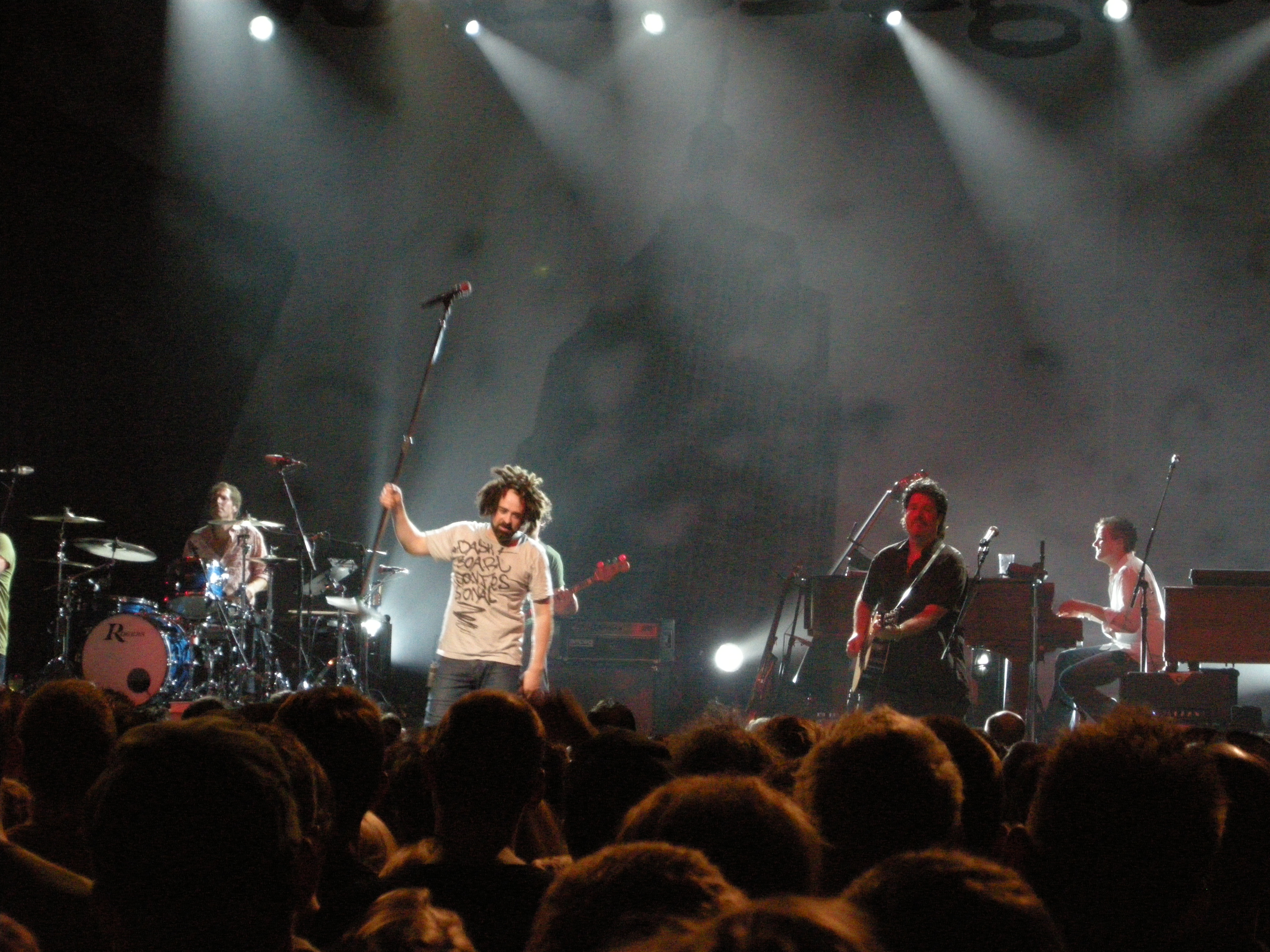
- Counting Crows in Brussels, 2008. Left to right: Bogios, Duritz, Immerglück, and Gillingham. Vickrey is cut off at the left, Powers is behind Duritz; Bryson is out of frame.

Background information
- Origin: Berkeley, California, U.S.
- Genres: Alternative rock; roots rock; pop rock
- Years active: 1991–present
- Labels: DGC; Geffen; Capitol; Cooking Vinyl
- Members: Adam Duritz; David Bryson; Charlie Gillingham; Dan Vickrey; David Immerglück; Jim Bogios; Millard Powers
- Past members: Steve Bowman; Ben Mize; Matt Malley
- Website: countingcrows.com

Counting Crows is an American rock band from Berkeley, California. Formed in 1991, the band consists of rhythm guitarist David Bryson, drummer Jim Bogios, vocalist Adam Duritz, keyboardist Charlie Gillingham, multi-instrumentalist David Immerglück, bassist Millard Powers, and lead guitarist Dan Vickrey. Past members include drummers Steve Bowman (1991–1994) and Ben Mize (1994–2002), and bassist Matt Malley (1991–2005).

Counting Crows gained popularity following the release of their first album, August and Everything After (1993). With the breakthrough hit single "Mr. Jones" (1993), the album sold more than seven million copies in the United States. The band received two Grammy Awards nominations in 1994, one for "Best Rock Performance by a Duo or Group with Vocal" (for "Round Here") and one for "Best New Artist". The follow-up album, Recovering the Satellites, reached number one on the US Billboard 200 album chart and reached number one in several other countries. All but one of their subsequent albums reached the top 10 on the Billboard 200 list.

Their hit singles include the aforementioned "Mr. Jones" as well as "Rain King", "A Long December", "Hanginaround", and a cover version of Joni Mitchell's "Big Yellow Taxi". Counting Crows received a 2004 Academy Award nomination for the single "Accidentally in Love", which was included in the film Shrek 2. The band has sold more than 20 million albums and is known for its dynamic live performances. Billboard has also ranked the band as the 8th greatest Adult Alternative Artist of all time.

The band released the album Somewhere Under Wonderland in 2014. They released a four-song EP in 2021 titled Butter Miracle, Suite One. This was expanded into Butter Miracle, The Complete Sweets!, a full-length album with five additional songs at the start, in May 2025.

== Origin of band name ==
The band name is derived from "One for Sorrow", a British divination nursery rhyme about the superstitious counting of magpies, which are members of the crow family. Singer Adam Duritz heard the rhyme in the film Signs of Life, which starred his close friend, actress Mary-Louise Parker.

Here is one modern version of the rhyme:

One for sorrow,
Two for joy,
Three for a girl,
Four for a boy,
Five for silver,
Six for gold,
Seven for a secret,
Never to be told.
Eight for a wish,
Nine for a kiss,
Ten for a bird,
You must not miss.

The rhyme is featured in the song "A Murder of One" on the band's debut album, August and Everything After.

== History ==
=== 1990s ===
==== 1991–1992: Formation and early years ====
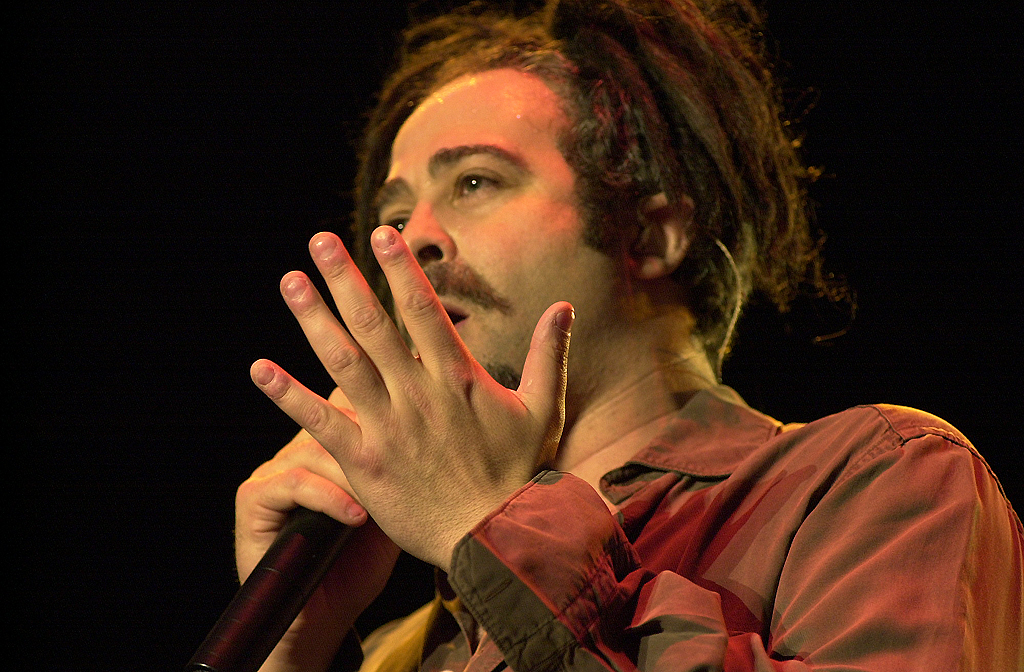
Vocalist Adam Duritz

Adam Duritz, former member of the San Francisco Bay Area band the Himalayans, and producer/guitarist David Bryson formed Counting Crows in San Francisco in 1991. They began as an acoustic duo, playing gigs in and around Berkeley and San Francisco. Friend David Immerglück played with them from time to time on a variety of instruments, though he was not an official member of the group. As the emerging band recorded some demos, and as other musicians joined the duo to make a full band, Immerglück recorded with the band on some songs for its first album. He declined to join the band, citing his obligations with two other locally popular bands: Monks of Doom and Camper Van Beethoven. By 1993, the band had grown to a stable lineup of Duritz as vocalist, occasional pianist, and primary songwriter, Bryson on guitar, Matt Malley playing bass guitar, Charlie Gillingham on keyboards, and Steve Bowman as drummer, and the band was a regular in the Bay Area scene.

When Gary Gersh of Geffen Records heard the band's demo tape, he was "blown away". A bidding war between nine different record labels broke out in February 1992. In April, the band—which, by that time, included other members—"signed a deal with Gersh and Geffen believed to be so lucrative that industry wags dubbed them Accounting Crows". On January 16, 1993, the band, still relatively unknown, filled in for Van Morrison at the Rock & Roll Hall of Fame ceremony, and was introduced by an enthusiastic Robbie Robertson. At the ceremony, they played a cover of Van Morrison's "Caravan".

Before signing to Geffen, the band recorded demo versions of a number of songs, known as the "Flying Demos". These later surfaced among the Counting Crows fanbase. Tracks include "Rain King", "Omaha", "Anna Begins", "Einstein on the Beach (For an Eggman)", "Shallow Days", "Love and Addiction", "Mr. Jones", "Round Here", "40 Years", "Margery Dreams of Horses", "Bulldog", "Lightning", and "We're Only Love".

==== 1993–1994: August and Everything After and popular success ====
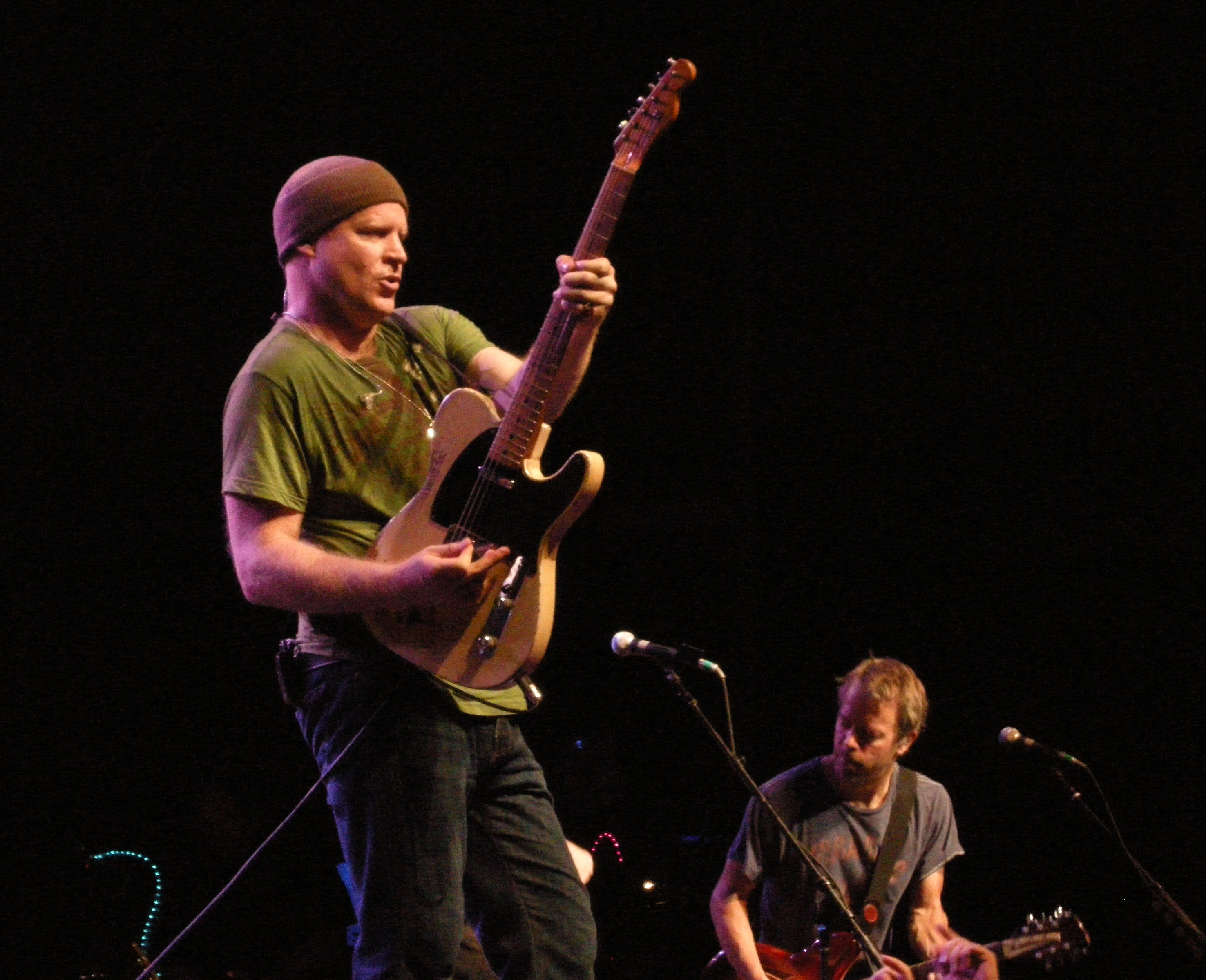
Dan Vickrey, David Bryson

The band's debut album, August and Everything After, was released in September 1993. The album's first single, "Mr. Jones", refers to Marty Jones (Himalayans bassist, and Duritz's childhood friend) and Kenney Dale Johnson (the drummer of Silvertone, Chris Isaak's band). It describes the desire of working musicians to make it big and the fantasies they entertain about what fame might bring. Duritz sang the song in fun, enjoying the fantasy; he did not realize that just months later, in December 1993, MTV would begin playing the video for the song. "Mr. Jones" was a breakthrough hit, drawing massive radio play and launching the band into stardom. In 2018, the Chicago Sun-Times described August and Everything After as follows:

"August And Everything After" [launched] the Bay Area septet with its hippie-inspired, roots-rock-infiltrating hits "Mr. Jones", "Round Here", and "Rain King", (ironically, at a time when grunge dominated the charts). Counting Crows eschewed the trend, happily wearing their time-stamped influences like Van Morrison and The Band on their patchwork sleeves, and found an audience who agreed with them. That first album went on to become a seven-times-platinum success in the U.S. alone, at the time the fastest-selling record since Nirvana's Nevermind.

With "Mr. Jones" propelling the band forward, and with positive reviews from Rolling Stone and other publications, it was decided that the band could use a second guitarist, and Dan Vickrey, another Bay Area musician, was offered the role as lead guitarist, singing backing vocals. The band toured extensively in 1993 and 1994, both as headliners and in supporting roles with other artists, including the Rolling Stones, Cracker, the Cranberries, Suede, Bob Dylan, Los Lobos, Jellyfish, and Midnight Oil. In 1994, the band appeared on the January 15 broadcast of Saturday Night Live an appearance that Duritz credited with opening the band from a mostly radio play audience to a broader audience and propelling record sales. The band also appeared on Late Show with David Letterman. The album sold seven million copies in the U.S. The band received two Grammy nominations in 1994; one for Best Rock Performance By A Duo Or Group With Vocal (for "Round Here") and one for Best New Artist.

Success took a toll on Counting Crows; Duritz suffered a widely reported nervous breakdown, which was not his first. Towards the end of 1994, Bowman was fired from the band. He was replaced on drums by Ben Mize.

==== 1995–1998: Recovering the Satellites and double live album ====
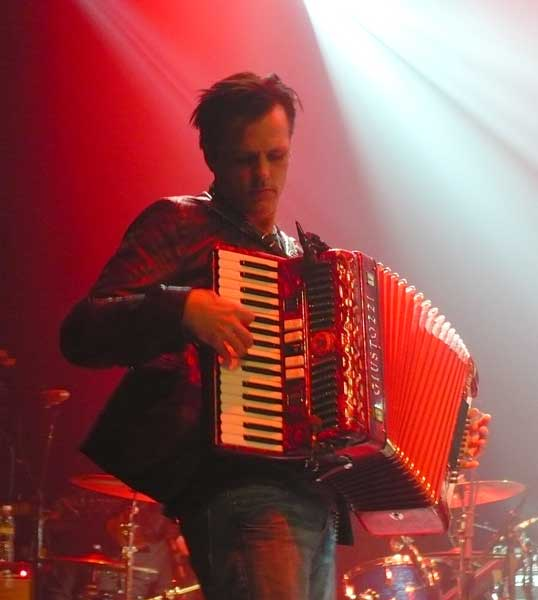
Charlie Gillingham, keyboardist for the band, on accordion

The band played only two gigs in 1995. This allowed Duritz to write a set of songs that became the band's second album, Recovering the Satellites. Released October 15, 1996, it was heavier than August and Everything After. A response to the sudden fame that "Mr. Jones" had brought, it contains lyrics such as "These days I feel like I'm fading away / Like sometimes when I hear myself on the radio" (from "Have You Seen Me Lately?") and "Gonna get back to basics / Guess I'll start it up again" (from "Recovering the Satellites"). Dealing with the theme of Duritz's unease with his newfound fame, the album was described as "a concept album of sorts about trying to pick up the pieces of a family, a social life and a psyche shattered by fame". This album contained the single "A Long December", which was a number one hit in Canada and a Top 10 hit in the United States.

On July 2, 1997, Counting Crows started off a co-headlining tour with the Wallflowers that continued to September. The tour included opening acts by Bettie Serveert, Engine 88, Gigolo Aunts and That Dog, with each opening band touring for three-weeks. After nine months of near-constant touring in support of the album, Duritz developed nodules on his vocal cords in July 1997, leading to the cancellation of a number of gigs. After taking time off to recover, the band toured for the rest of 1997, concluding with a MTV show at the Hammerstein Ballroom in New York City. This concert was released as half of a double live album, Across a Wire: Live in New York City. The other disc was a recording of a predominantly acoustic set from the band's appearance on the VH1 Storytellers show.

==== 1999–2001: This Desert Life and extensive touring ====
In 1999, Counting Crows performed at Woodstock 99. Later that same year, the band released This Desert Life, sales of which were propelled by the success of "Hanginaround" and "Colorblind", which was also featured in the movie Cruel Intentions. Supporting the album, the band embarked on a co-headlining tour with alternative rock band Live. Counting Crows closed nearly every show. Before this album and subsequent tour, the band invited session player and long-time friend David Immerglück to join the band as a permanent member. Immerglück had played on every Counting Crows album as a sideman, but early on had declined a permanent position. This time, however, Immerglück agreed. He plays a variety of instruments with the band, including acoustic, electric and pedal steel guitars, slide guitar and mandolin, as well as backing vocals.

=== 2000s ===
==== 2002–2003: Hard Candy and greatest hits album ====
On July 9, 2002, the band released its fourth studio album, Hard Candy. The album included a cover of Joni Mitchell's song "Big Yellow Taxi". Vanessa Carlton contributed backing vocals to the single edit of the track, which appeared on the soundtrack for Two Weeks Notice and was re-released on future Hard Candy albums. The original version, without vocals by Carlton, appeared on the first album release as a hidden track. Hard Candy received better reviews than the previous efforts, with "radio friendly" songs, like "American Girls" (which featured Sheryl Crow on backing vocals), and contains a more upbeat feel and tempo. The band toured with the Dutch band, Bløf. A song, "Holiday in Spain", came together as a result of the camaraderie between the two groups: it is sung partly as a dual language duet, and partly as a musical "round", with both lead singers singing in differing languages at the end of the song.

Midway through the Hard Candy tour, drummer Mize amicably left the band to spend more time with his family and pursue his own musical interests. After Mize completed the American leg of the tour, he was replaced by Jim Bogios, formerly a drummer with Ben Folds and Sheryl Crow. Bogios attributes leaving Sheryl Crow for Counting Crows to becoming a band member and having more creative input. Following the Hard Candy tour, longtime bassist Malley left the band after growing weary of touring, and to attend to his duties as a new father. He was replaced by Millard Powers.

Counting Crows released the greatest hits album Films About Ghosts in November 2003.

==== 2004–2006: Oscars and New Amsterdam ====
In 2004, the band's "Accidentally in Love" song appeared on the soundtrack of the animated film Shrek 2. At the 77th Academy Awards, the song was nominated for Best Original Song, but lost to "Al otro lado del río" from The Motorcycle Diaries.

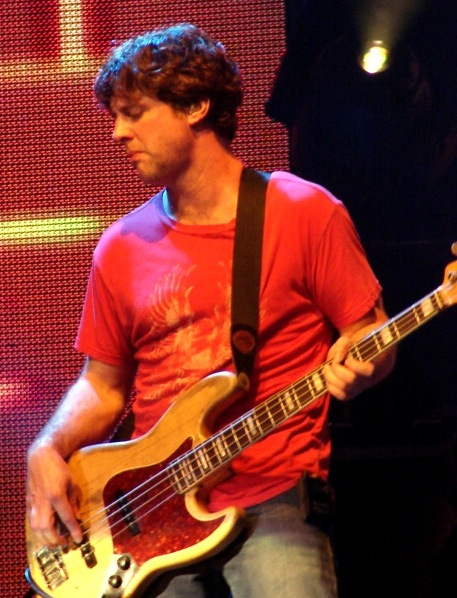
Bassist Millard Powers

In June 2006, the band released New Amsterdam: Live at Heineken Music Hall album.

==== 2007–2008: Saturday Nights & Sunday Mornings ====
Duritz hinted in a 2006 interview that Counting Crows' next studio record would be released in late 2007. He indicated that the band had spent three weeks working in a recording studio with Gil Norton, the producer behind Recovering the Satellites, and revealed the working title of the album to be Saturday Nights & Sunday Mornings. Duritz explained that, "Saturday night is when you sin and Sunday is when you regret. Sinning is often done very loudly, angrily, bitterly, violently." Vickrey stated that "the idea at the moment is to have kind of a rocking side and then an acoustic-y, maybe country-ish side. We got the first half done in May in New York, so half of it is pretty strong and done. And now we're going to work on the second half, the country tunes, during the tour."

Amidst touring in the summer of 2007, the band performed live before the Home Run Derby at the 2007 MLB All-Star Game on July 9, 2007. On July 22 they previewed two new songs at Daniel S. Frawley Stadium in Wilmington, Delaware, a new ballad titled "Washington Square" and a hard rocking track called "Cowboys". On August 8, 2007, VH1 filmed a live performance of "Mr. Jones", clips of which were shown on the miniseries 100 Greatest Songs of the 90s. The song ranked No. 27 on the list.

In September 2007, Counting Crows played a unique show at Town Hall in New York City, during which it performed all the tracks from August and Everything After in album order. The show was recorded for a planned DVD release, and also featured several songs from the new album. On September 27, Duritz announced on his blog that the band had asked its record label to postpone the release of Saturday Nights & Sunday Mornings until early 2008, citing the time pressures involved in preparing both the new album and an August and Everything After deluxe edition for release.

On January 16, 2008, the band released a digital single on its official website as a free download. It featured "1492" from the "Saturday Nights" half of the new album, and "When I Dream Of Michelangelo" from the "Sunday Mornings" half as its B-side. The album was released on March 25, 2008.

==== Departure from Geffen ====
On March 22, 2009, Duritz announced on the band's website that they would be leaving Geffen Records, with whom they had worked for 18 years. He ended the post with a free download of the band's cover of Madonna's "Borderline", recorded live at the Royal Albert Hall in 2003.

Following the departure from Geffen, the band has continued to tour. During the summer of 2009, they launched the ambitious Saturday Night Rebel Rockers Traveling Circus and Medicine Show tour with longtime Bay Area friend Michael Franti, his band Spearhead, and the band Augustana. Instead of the traditional concert format of a short set by an opening act, followed by a longer set from a main supporting act, and then a long set by the headlining band, the shows featured members of all of the bands joining each other for songs from each bands' catalogs at various points throughout the evening. As Duritz explained in a welcoming message on the official website for the tour, each show "is going to start with EVERYONE onstage together and we're going to all be running on & off stage all night playing one each other's songs all together and basically just playing whenever we feel like playing."

=== 2010s ===
==== 2010–2013: Independent releases and individual projects ====
The album August and Everything After: Live at Town Hall was released on August 29, 2011. The release marked the band's third professionally produced live album, and the first concert video of its career. The album used footage from the Town Hall concert, recorded in September 2007.

The band released a covers album entitled Underwater Sunshine (Or What We Did On Our Summer Vacation) on April 10, 2012, with a cover design by a fan chosen in a promotional contest. After touring extensively in 2012 and 2013 in support of the album (including headlining The Outlaw Roadshow, a traveling festival tour presented in conjunction with Ryan Spaulding of the music blog Ryan's Smashing Life, and touring North America in the summer of 2013 with the Wallflowers), the band began working on material for a new album. Duritz also took time in the summer of 2012 to begin co-writing a play called Black Sun, which will also feature some music written by Duritz, including well-known rarity songs "Good Luck" and "Chelsea".

A live album, Echoes of the Outlaw Roadshow, was released in North America in November 2013.

==== 2014–2019: Somewhere Under Wonderland, podcast and wine ====
The writing of material for a new album, Somewhere Under Wonderland, began early in 2013 and continued during that year's summer tour. The album was released on September 2, 2014.

In 2018, Duritz became an investor in three wineries based in Napa Valley, California—Elyse Winery, Institution Winery, and Addax Winery—managed by winemaker Russell Bevan.

Starting in February 2018, Duritz began recording the Underwater Sunshine Podcast, a weekly music podcast with author and music journalist James Campion. Having parted ways with Spaulding, Duritz and friends began putting on their own twice-annual music festival in New York called the Underwater Sunshine Fest to showcase independent music. The first festival, held at the Bowery Electric in October 2018, featured 17 bands over two nights. A second in April 2019 showcased 18 bands, and a third held at Rockwood Music Hall in November 2019 expanded the lineup to 26. Acts as diverse as Yellow House Orchestra, Seán Barna, Mikaela Davis, Marcy Playground, Matt Sucich, Stephen Kellogg, Stew and the Negro Problem, and Fairhazel have appeared. More bands recorded acoustic sessions at Duritz's loft the weekends of each of the festivals.

In January 2019, Counting Crows released a newly recorded version of "August and Everything After" performed with the London Symphony Orchestra at AIR Studios. The song was cut from the band's first album, which had been named after it. Duritz then revealed in late 2019 that he had begun writing new music that past August.

=== 2020s ===
==== 2020–present: Butter Miracle, cooking and more ====
In early February 2020, Duritz described the band's next project as suites of music that may be released on various EPs. The band began studio sessions in late February and early March on four songs that complete the first suite: "The Tall Grass", "Elevator Boots", "The Angel of 14th Street", and "Bobby and the Rat Kings". Mott the Hoople, Thin Lizzy, and Seán Barna's album CISSY were cited as influences on demos of the songs.

During the COVID-19 pandemic, without touring and being unable to work on music in the studio, as well as taking a hiatus from his podcast, Duritz began hosting cooking videos through his Instagram stories. Speaking with chef Tyler Florence, Duritz said the type of research he would do regarding music for the podcast he turned into exploring more about food and cooking to share with others. Duritz and Campion would return to producing the Underwater Sunshine Podcast in May 2021.

"Elevator Boots" was released as the first single for the four-track EP in April 2021, described by Rolling Stone as "a melodic, wistful ode to life on tour, with a sound that somehow manages to bridge the gap between The Band and Mott the Hoople." The EP, titled Butter Miracle, Suite One, was released on May 21, 2021.

At the time, Duritz told Rolling Stone that a second EP, Butter Miracle, Suite Two, would be released and together with the first form a full album. He was writing songs for the second EP, and the band planned to resume touring in the fall of 2021. In February 2022, Duritz appeared as a guest vocalist on two tracks on Gang of Youths' third studio album Angel in Realtime. Later that year, he confirmed that he had completed writing for Suite Two, but that he believed that the initial songwriting was not strong enough. He decided to rewrite the songs and add an additional composition, and that recording for the follow-up could only happen once the band was done with touring.

During the 2022 Butter Miracle Tour, Counting Crows performed live in Israel for the first time, playing in an amphitheater in the city of Ra'anana. In April 2023, the band returned to Australia and New Zealand for a series of headlining shows, with English musician Frank Turner supporting them. The following year, the Oneness Tour saw them travel with Santana.

On February 21, 2025, the band put out a new single, "Spaceman in Tulsa", to announce the release date for the upcoming album Butter Miracle, The Complete Sweets!. Forgoing a second EP, the new album, with the four songs from the Suite One EP, plus five additional songs, was released on May 9, 2025.

== Influences, live performances and covers ==
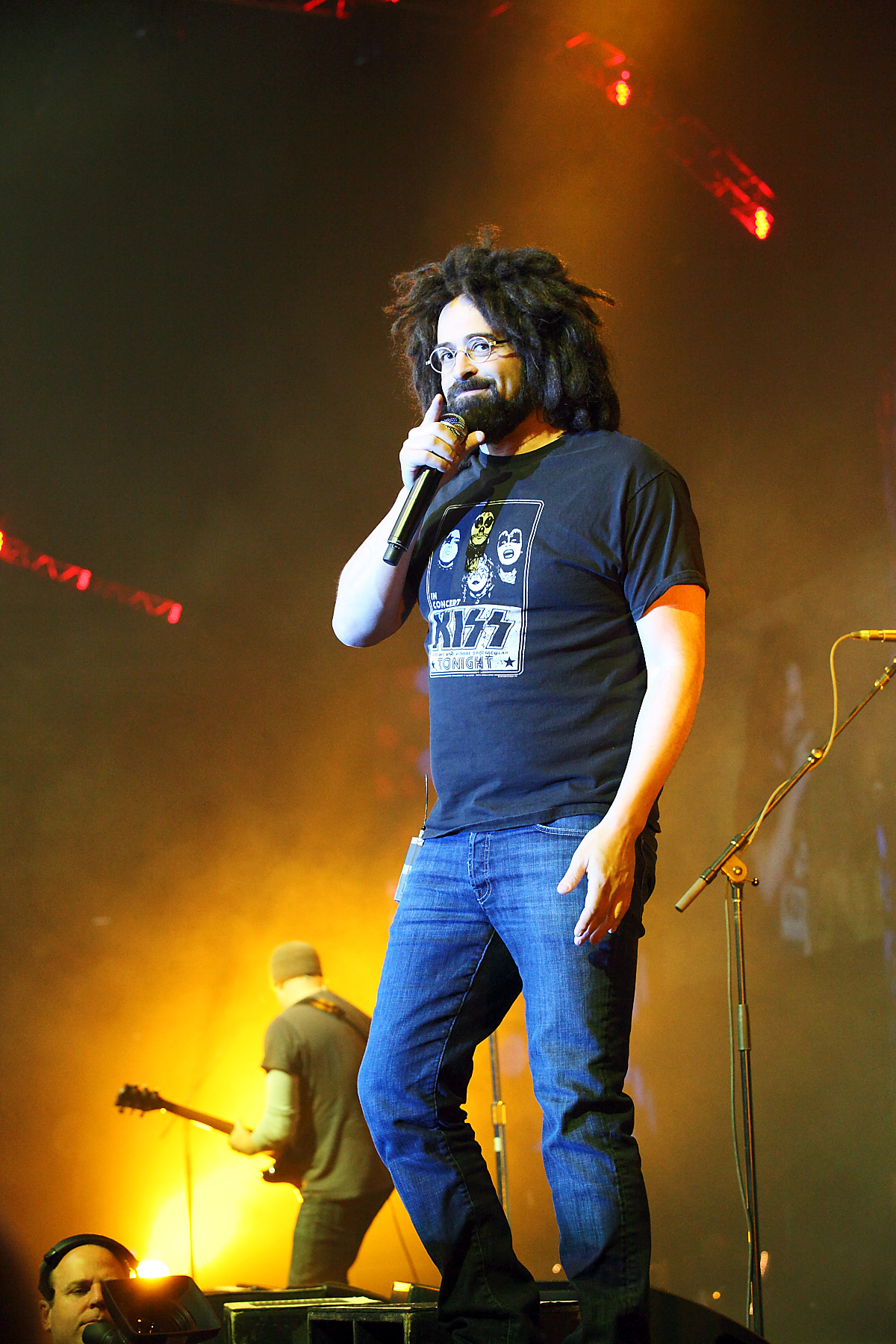
Duritz performing with the band in May 2010

Counting Crows, and Duritz in particular, have become renowned for energetic, passionate live performances. The band's influences include Van Morrison, R.E.M., and Bob Dylan.

Several Counting Crows songs have been altered during the band's live performances, such as "Round Here", "Goodnight Elisabeth", "Rain King", and "A Murder of One". This can be heard on the Across a Wire: Live in New York City album on the first disc (on which "Round Here" contains lyrics from "Have You Seen Me Lately?") and the second disc ("Anna Begins" has an extended midsection with new lyrics, and the introduction to "Mr. Jones" includes lyrics from "Miller's Angels" and from the Byrds' "So You Wanna Be A Rock & Roll Star").

In February 2011, Duritz released an indie album of cover songs he had recorded entitled All My Bloody Valentines. He allowed Facebook followers to help name and design the cover art for the album.

The band has sold more than 20 million albums worldwide.

== Documentary ==
On December 18, 2025, HBO Max released Counting Crows: Have You Seen Me Lately? a feature-length documentary under its Music Box series that focuses on the band's rise to fame after the release of August and Everything After and the making of Recovering the Satellites.

The film was directed by Amy Scott and features David Bryson, Charlie Gillingham, Dan Vickrey, and David Immerglück, as well as former bandmate Matt Malley. Additional celebrities such as Cyndi Lauper, Chris Martin of Coldplay, actress Mary-Louise Parker, and comedian Jeff Ross were also interviewed for the film, among other notable interviewees.

== Band members ==
=== Current members ===
- David Bryson – rhythm guitar (1994–present), backing vocals (1991–present), lead guitar (1991–1994)
- Adam Duritz – lead vocals, keyboards, occasional harmonica and auxiliary percussion (1991–present)
- Charlie Gillingham – keyboards, backing vocals (1991–present), accordion, clarinet (1996–present)
- Dan Vickrey – lead guitar, backing vocals (1994–present), banjo (2002–present)
- David Immerglück – guitars, bass, pedal steel, mandolin, backing vocals (1999–present, session musician 1993–1999), banjo (2011–present)
- Jim Bogios – drums, backing vocals (2002–present)
- Millard Powers – bass, piano, rhythm guitar, backing vocals (2005–present)

=== Former members ===
- Steve Bowman – drums, backing vocals (1991–1994)
- Matt Malley – bass, rhythm guitar, backing vocals (1991–2005)
- Ben Mize – drums, backing vocals (1994–2002)

== Accolades ==
=== American Music Awards ===
The American Music Awards is an annual awards ceremony created by Dick Clark in 1973.

Year	Nominee / work	Award	Result
1995	August and Everything After	Favorite Pop/Rock Album	Nominated
1995	Counting Crows	Favorite Pop/Rock New Artist	Nominated
1995	Counting Crows	Favorite Alternative Artist	Won

=== Grammy Awards ===
The Grammy Awards are awarded annually by the National Academy of Recording Arts and Sciences.

Year	Nominee / work	Award	Result
1995	"Round Here"	Best Rock Vocal Performance by a Duo or Group	Nominated
1995	Counting Crows	Best New Artist	Nominated

=== Juno Awards ===
The Juno Awards, more popularly known as the JUNOS, are awards presented annually to Canadian musical artists and bands to acknowledge their artistic and technical achievements in all aspects of music.

Year	Nominee / work	Award	Result
1995	August and Everything After	Best Selling Album (Foreign or Domestic)	Nominated

=== MTV Video Music Awards ===
The MTV Video Music Awards were established in 1984 by MTV to celebrate the top music videos of the year

Year	Nominee / work	Award	Result
1994	"Mr. Jones"	Best New Artist in a Video	Won
1997	"A Long December"	Best Group Video	Nominated

== Discography ==
Studio albums

- August and Everything After (1993)
- Recovering the Satellites (1996)
- This Desert Life (1999)
- Hard Candy (2002)
- Saturday Nights & Sunday Mornings (2008)
- Underwater Sunshine (or What We Did on Our Summer Vacation) (2012)
- Somewhere Under Wonderland (2014)
- Butter Miracle, The Complete Sweets! (2025)

== See also ==
- List of bands from the San Francisco Bay Area
