= Dan Vickrey =

American musician (born 1966)

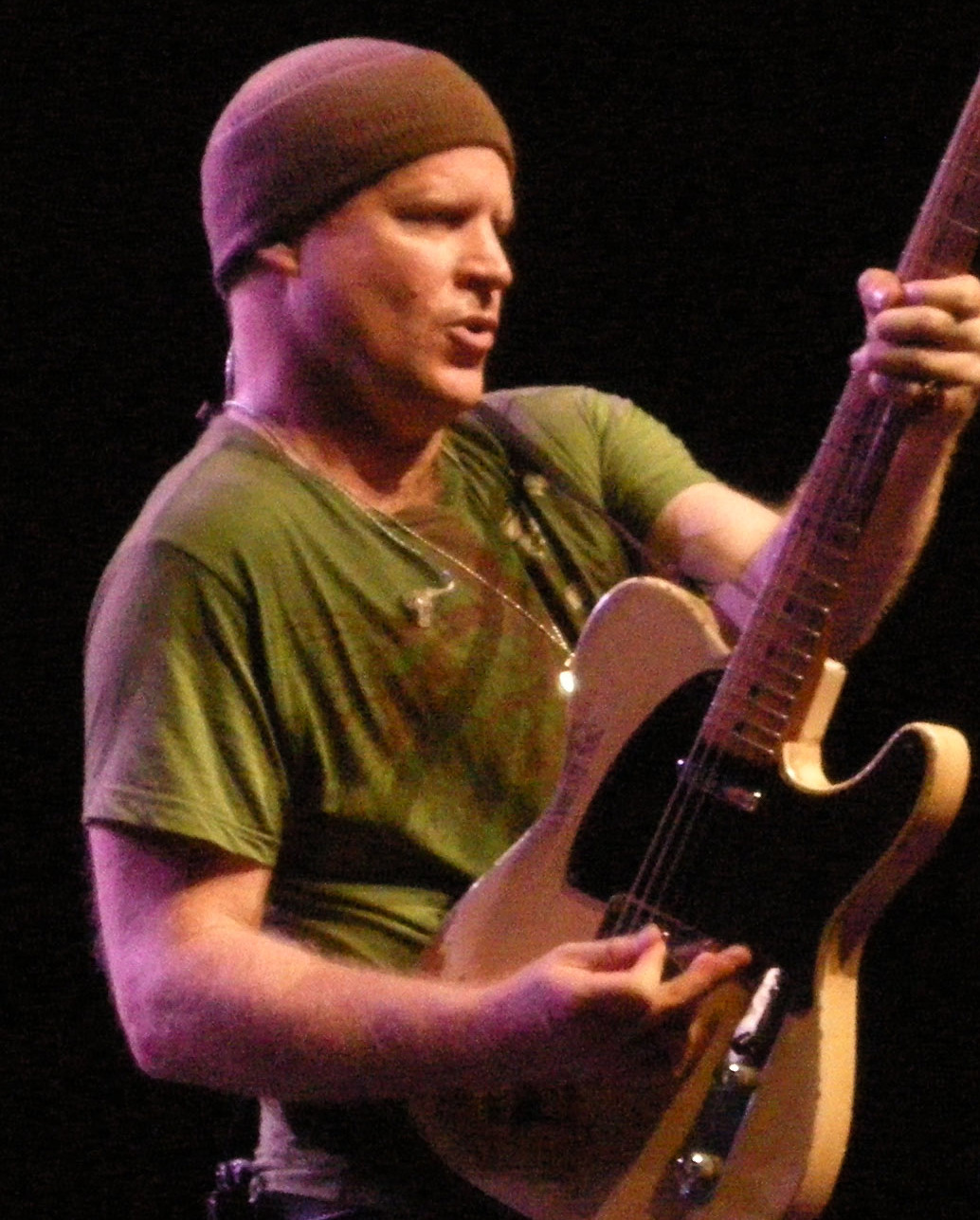
- Vickrey, with Counting Crows in Brussels, 2008

Background information
- Born: Daniel Vickrey; August 26, 1966 (age 60); Walnut Creek, California, United States
- Genres: Rock; alternative rock; pop rock
- Occupations: Musician; singer; songwriter
- Instrument: Guitar
- Years active: 1994–current
- Member of: Counting Crows

Daniel Vickrey (born August 26, 1966) is an American musician. He has performed since 1994 as a lead guitarist in the alternative rock band Counting Crows. Vickrey also provides backing vocals, and is a harmonist within the band.

As co-writer of a number of hit songs with Counting Crows, Vickrey has distinguished himself as a nominee for a Grammy Award, Golden Globe Award, an Oscar, and was a winner of an award from BMI for co-writing the song "Accidentally in Love."

== Early years and influences ==
Vickrey learned to play the guitar when he was about 11 years old with his father. Because of this, he was first influenced by his father's musical preferences. From childhood, he had listened to vinyl records belonging to his father, older brother, and sister. Albums in these collections featured Bruce Springsteen, Willie Nelson, Frank Sinatra, Stevie Wonder, Lynyrd Skynyrd, and his sister's Bee Gees records. Vickrey's next-door neighbor introduced him to The Beatles, and Vickrey began spending time at a local guitar shop where he found a guitar teacher named Bruce Hock, a blues fanatic, who gave Vickrey a taste of some of Eric Clapton's earliest work, performing with John Mayall & the Bluesbreakers, which left a lasting impression on him. He joined his first band with his neighbor, Steve Bowman, and his brother.

== Counting Crows ==
As he matured, Vickrey continued playing with various bands, branching out into songwriting and eventually, while attending UCLA, he played his own compositions solo with acoustic guitar, in local coffee houses and small venues which included Madame Wong's and the Viper Room, (even before it had that name). After graduation from College, and a return to the San Francisco Bay Area, he was introduced to Charles Gillingham by a mutual friend, and after playing with him for a time, was surprised to find he had quit all his various musical pursuits to join a new band, Counting Crows. Vickrey was an original fan and expressed a desire to join the band if a guitarist was ever needed. In late 1993, Vickrey was asked to join after the release of their first album, August and Everything After, when the band felt they could benefit with a new lead guitarist. At that point, Vickrey joined the band, performing on guitar, joining David Bryson in providing harmony and backing vocals for the band. He has performed on every album and tour since that time.

== Tender Mercies ==
In 2011, Vickrey along with the San Francisco songwriters, guitarist Patrick Winningham, bassist Kurt Stevenson and Counting Crows drummer Jim Bogios, joined Tender Mercies to produce and release their eponymous debut album.

== Personal interests ==
Vickrey's interests include politics, playing and collecting vintage guitars and amplifiers, film and music. He now resides in the San Francisco Bay Area.
