= Charlie Gillingham =

American musician (born 1960)

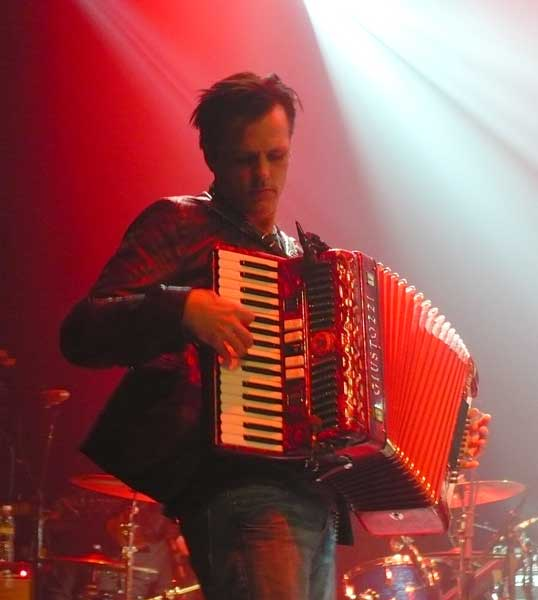
- Gillingham in 2008

Background information
- Born: Charles Thomas Gillingham; January 26, 1960 (age 66)
- Origin: Torrance, California, U.S.
- Genre: Rock
- Occupation: Musician
- Instrument: Keyboards
- Years active: 1990–present

Charles Thomas Gillingham (born January 26, 1960) is an American keyboardist and multi-instrumentalist, best known for his performance on the Hammond B-3 organ, accordion, piano, and keyboards for the band Counting Crows. He has also played the bass guitar in live shows during certain songs such as "Holiday in Spain".

== Early life and education ==
Charles Thomas Gillingham was born on January 26, 1960 in Torrance, California. Gillingham attended Richard Henry Dana Junior High in San Pedro, California, and also attended Miraleste High School in Rancho Palos Verdes. Gillingham studied philosophy and artificial intelligence at University of California, Berkeley. Before entering the music industry, he worked as a software engineer in the field of artificial intelligence.

== Career ==
He was a member of Slip Stream, Clark, Kent, and the Reporters, Midnight Radio, Zip Code Revue, and played keyboards on Train's 1998 debut album.

In 2004, Gillingham was nominated for an Oscar as co-composer of the song "Accidentally in Love". He was put forward in the category Academy Award for Best Original Song with his fellow songwriters Adam Duritz, Jim Bogios, David Immerglück, Matt Malley, David Bryson and Dan Vickrey. The track was used in the film Shrek 2.

== Personal life ==
In 2004, Charles divorced from his first wife, Gretchen Rosenblatt - daughter of the late Geffen Records co-founder, Eddie Rosenblatt. The couple had two children Josephine and Dashiell. In 2006, Gillingham married television producer Nikki Varhely. Together they had two sons, True in 2008 and Ever in 2013. Ever has performed on stage with Counting Crows many times over the years, playing piano and organ.

== Recordings ==
Apart from his work with Counting Crows, Gillingham also contributed to the following recordings:

- Low Stars – Low Stars – 2007
- Comfort in Sound – Feeder – 2003
- Propeller – Peter Stuart – 2002
- Nowhere is Brighter – Garrin Benfield – 2002
- Still Waiting for Spring – Matt Nathanson – 2000
- Train – Train – 1998
- Whatnot – Cola – 1997
- The Golden Age – Cracker – 1996
- Abundance – Zip Code Revue – 1996
- Slipaway – Jerry Shelfer – 1992
- United Kingdom – American Music Club – 1990

== See also ==
- List of Hammond organ players
