= Adam Duritz =

American singer

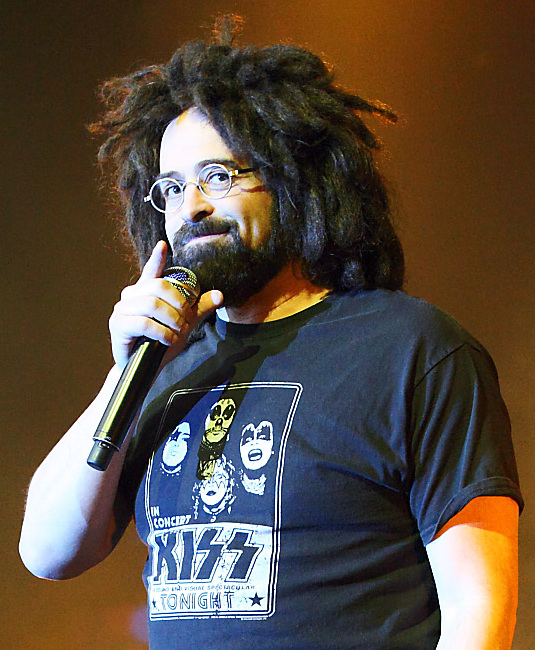
- Duritz in 2010

Background information
- Born: Adam Fredric Duritz; August 1, 1964 (age 62); Baltimore, Maryland, U.S.
- Genres: Folk rock; alternative rock; pop rock
- Occupations: Singer; songwriter; record producer
- Instruments: Vocals; keyboards; harmonica; percussion
- Years active: 1990–present
- Member of: Counting Crows; Mod-L Society
- Formerly of: The Himalayans; Sordid Humor
- Website: countingcrows.com

Adam Fredric Duritz (born August 1, 1964) is an American singer, best known as the frontman for the rock band Counting Crows, for which he serves as a founding member and main composer. Since its founding in 1991, Counting Crows has sold over 20 million records, released seven studio albums that have been certified gold or platinum, and been nominated for two Grammy Awards and an Academy Award.

Duritz has recorded solo material of his own and has collaborated with other musical acts. He has also founded two record labels, E Pluribus Unum and Tyrannosaurus Records. His work scoring music for film earned an award from BMI for co-writing the song "Accidentally in Love" for the movie Shrek 2.

== Career ==
Duritz and producer/guitarist David Bryson formed Counting Crows in San Francisco in 1991. When Gary Gersh of Geffen Records heard the band's demo tape, he was "blown away". A bidding war between nine different record labels broke out in February 1992. In April, the band—which, by that time, included other members—"signed a deal with Gersh and Geffen believed to be so lucrative that industry wags dubbed them Accounting Crows".

The band's first album, August and Everything After, charted within the top five of the Billboard 200, and the single "Mr. Jones" (1993) was a number-one hit in Canada. After the band performed as the music guest on Saturday Night Live, "Mr. Jones" jumped 40 spots in the charts. The album has been certified 7× Platinum by the Recording Industry Association of America. Six of the band's albums have charted on the Billboard 200 and four have been certified gold or platinum by the Recording Industry Association of America. Counting Crows was nominated for two Grammy Awards in 1994. The band also received a 2004 Academy Award nomination for the song "Accidentally in Love", which was included in the film Shrek 2.

Duritz has collaborated with The Wallflowers (led by Jakob Dylan) on the album Bringing Down the Horse on the track "6th Avenue Heartache"; with Ryan Adams on Gold and the song "Butterfly in Reverse" from Hard Candy; with Peter Stuart on Propeller and Daisy; with Live on V;, with Dashboard Confessional on the track "So Long, So Long" from Dusk and Summer, with Maria Taylor on the song "Waiting In Line", and with Nanci Griffith on the song "Going Back to Georgia" on her album Flyer.

Duritz also contributed the songs "Spin Around", "You Don't See Me", and "You're a Star" to the Josie and the Pussycats soundtrack that was performed by the film's fictional title band. Along with bandmates Dan Vickrey, Bryson, and Immerglück, Duritz co-wrote the song "Accidentally in Love" for the soundtrack of the movie Shrek 2, winning them each an award from BMI in 2005.

Duritz's lyrics have been described as "morose" and "tortured" and as "wordy introspection", while his vocals have been called "expressive".

In October 2018, Duritz co-founded the Underwater Sunshine Music Festival.

Duritz co-founded the record label E Pluribus Unum in 1997. Before the label was purchased by new ownership, Duritz had signed Joe 90, Gigolo Aunts, and Neilson Hubbard. In 2007, Duritz launched a record label called Tyrannosaurus Records. Debut artists on the label included Notar and Blacktop Mourning. As of 2015, the label was defunct.

Duritz was executive producer for the film The Locusts and produced the ensemble comedy film Freeloaders. He appeared in the 2007 mockumentary film Farce of the Penguins.

Duritz features prominently in Brian T. Atkinson's Love at the Five and Dime: The Songwriting Legacy of Nanci Griffith (Texas A&M University Press, 2024).

== Personal life ==
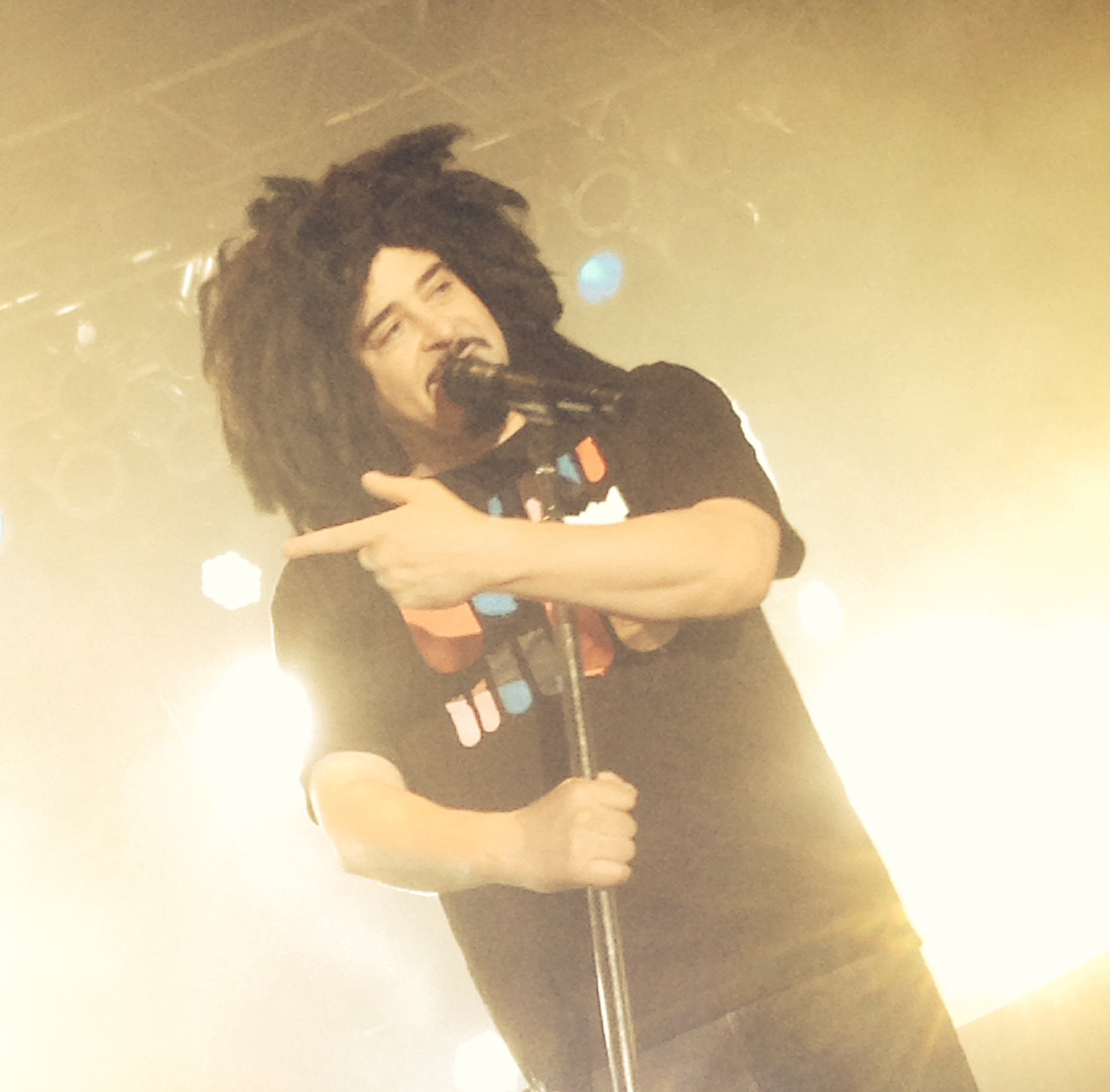
Adam Duritz

Duritz was born in 1964 in Baltimore, Maryland to Gilbert and Linda Duritz, both physicians. He has a younger sister, Nicole. Duritz is Jewish. His family lived near Pimlico. They moved to California when he was a child. He graduated from Head-Royce School in Oakland, California and attended the University of California, Berkeley, majoring in English, although he later dropped out. He credited his college experience with teaching him about writing and epistemology. He is a fan of the California Golden Bears.

Duritz has dissociative mental health issues. He disclosed this mental health issue publicly in 2008 and has noted his struggles with relationships. He has also said he stopped taking drugs at age 21 because, as he said, his mental health issues "did not mix well with drugs".

Duritz briefly dated actress Jennifer Aniston in 1995 after mutual friends got them together at The Viper Room. He has also been linked to Courteney Cox and Mary-Louise Parker. Duritz worked as a bartender at The Viper Room for a period of time after the suicide of Kurt Cobain to help keep his head clear.

In the summer of 2009, he started dating Emmy Rossum. The pair broke up in 2010.

In August 2019, Duritz—who had "rocked voluminous dreadlocks" since Counting Crows was formed—traveled to London to shave them. He had previously revealed some of the dreadlocks were extensions.

Duritz and Counting Crows were highlighted on HBO Music Box: Counting Crows Have You Seen Me Lately?
