= The Semantics =

American pop rock band

- Also known as: Spence Powers Owsley, Parade
- Origin: Nashville, Tennessee, United States
- Genres: Pop rock, power pop
- Years active: 1990–1996
- Labels: Sony Music Publishing, Geffen, Alfa International
- Past members: Will Owsley; Millard Powers; Jody Spence; Zak Starkey

The Semantics was an American pop rock band from Nashville, Tennessee, formed by Jody Spence (drums), Millard Powers (bass) and Will Owsley (guitars, vocals). Zak Starkey later replaced Spence on drums. The band recorded one album, Powerbill, which was released in Japan. After being dropped by their record label shortly after recording the album, the band members at the time (Powers, Owsley, and Starkey) all went on to successful careers in the music industry. Powers has performed as a bassist with Ben Folds and Counting Crows and has worked as a record engineer and producer. Owsley had a successful solo career before his death in 2010. Starkey has served as the drummer for the bands Oasis and The Who.

== History ==
Jody Spence and Owsley began writing songs after a couple of years of touring with Judson Spence, Jody's brother. Jody and Owsley soon got publishing contracts with Sony Music Publishing which were facilitated by Scott Siman in 1990. In 1991, Siman attended a show in North Carolina where a band called Majosha performed, which featured Ben Folds and Millard Powers. Not long after that, Siman brought Folds to Nashville and Powers later followed. Siman furnished a small demo studio that the Spence brothers, Owsley and Folds would often share. Folds would eventually introduce Millard Powers to Jody Spence and Owsley.

Within a month of meeting each other, Spence, Powers and Owsley had written and recorded entire albums worth of songs at the Sony Tree studio, 7 of which would later end up on the Geffen Records album Powerbill. The trio played a few shows in and around Nashville under the names "Spence Powers Owsley" and "Parade" with Folds sitting in on keys sometimes. The name "Jody's Powerbill", often confused with "The Semantics", was a name that Folds had suggested for the trio which they didn't use. Folds used the name himself for a while before becoming Ben Folds Five. After a trip to Los Angeles and changing their name to "The Semantics", the trio developed a buzz within the major labels which eventually brought John Kalodner of Geffen Records to Nashville, Tennessee for a showcase and the band ended up signing with him.

In the search for a producer, tensions grew between the three and Jody Spence ended up leaving the band. Spence was eventually replaced by drummer Zak Starkey, Ringo Starr's son. A producer was eventually found in Peter Asher, under whose tutelage the band members worked for four years on the album Powerbill, a process which had taught the band members much about the production process and about management. Powerbill was initially slated for release in 1993, but was never released in the U.S for being "too pop for alternative and too alternative for pop." It eventually got distributed in Japan through Alfa International on December 21, 1996.

Although suddenly being dropped from the label initially left some band members destitute and broke, they overcame this shock and continued to pursue a career in music, while also paying tribute to The Semantics. In 1999, Owsley re-recorded the "Coming Up Roses" and "The Sky Is Falling" for his eponymous first solo album Owsley. The album was nominated for a Grammy Award for Best Engineered Album. Millard Powers' 2001 solo album featured "Jenny Won't Play Fair", a re-recording of the song off Powerbill.

Powers, Starkey and Spence continue to perform and record. Will Owsley died in April 2010, as the result of an apparent suicide.

== Discography ==
- Powerbill (1993), Geffen Records (unreleased)
- Powerbill (December 21, 1996), Alfa International (Japan)
