= Hanging Tree (Counting Crows song) =

Song by Counting Crows

from the album Saturday Nights & Sunday Mornings
- Released: March 25, 2008
- Genre: Alternative rock
- Length: 3:50
- Label: Geffen
- Composer(s): Dan Vickrey, Adam Duritz
- Lyricist(s): Adam Duritz
- Producer(s): Gil Norton

"Hanging Tree" is the second track on Counting Crows' 2008 album Saturday Nights & Sunday Mornings.

== Song Meaning ==
Duritz has cited in interviews that the angst he felt not being around his grandmother for a long time due to frequent touring, up until her death while he was in Perth, Australia, inspired this song:

In the last five years of her life I barely saw her because I was always working. She didn't recognize me. To her I was this fat, hairy, bearded guy with dreadlocks. I think I scared her some of the time. And then it was too late... ...It's about losing that girl. It's a snapshot about when I am very much in love but I know I have to leave ... I wasn't good at being caring. It was a lot to handle me. I was 10,000 miles away and I wasn't there for her.

Duritz explained in an April 2008 interview the broader meaning of the song:

‘Hanging Tree’ is about looking in a very banal way. Sitting in a cafeteria with someone and losing your connection with someone in a very angry way in the most banal conversations in a cafeteria.

As with the tracks "Sundays" and "Insignificant", imagery pertaining to the Greek myth of Icarus appears in the song, specifically in the lyric: "I got a pair of wings for my birthday and I'll fall down through the sun this evening."

Duritz reportedly preferred having either this song or "When I Dream of Michelangelo" released as the lead single, as he believed either one of those tracks better represented the album as a whole thematically, in contrast to "You Can't Count on Me".
