= Listen to What the Man Said (album) =

Listen to What the Man Said: Popular Artists Pay Tribute to the Music of Paul McCartney

Compilation album by various artists
- Released: 18 September 2001 (UK); 30 October 2001 (US)
- Genre: various
- Length: 60:30
- Label: Oglio
- Producer: various

Listen to What the Man Said: Popular Artists Pay Tribute to the Music of Paul McCartney is a 2001 tribute album to the music of English musician Paul McCartney, featuring covers of McCartney's music by various artists. It has a companion album titled Coming Up: An Indie Tribute to the Music of Paul McCartney.

The album and its companion are charity albums, with the profits of the albums going to the Susan G. Komen Breast Cancer Foundation, in memory of McCartney's wife Linda who died of the disease in 1998.

The opening track, a cover of "Band on the Run", was included on Owsley's album The Hard Way as a hidden track.

Each of the artists on the album have cited McCartney as an influence and all waived studio costs and royalties of the album to the Komen Foundation.

== Critical reception ==
Professional ratings
Review scores
Source	Rating
AllMusic	3.5/5 stars
Pitchfork	5/10

AllMusic critic Kenneth Bays said that "Covering the songs of Paul McCartney's solo career is a daunting task", noting "it's surprising that Listen to What the Man Said works as well as it does", concluding saying that "either way, Listen to What the Man Said isn't going to go down as a timeless album, but it has enough moments of pop pleasure to be recommended to the more adventurous McCartney fans."

Joe Tangari of Pitchfork states: "A few of the selections here manage to do clever things with their respective originals, and all of the readings at least reflect a genuine admiration for the source material", noting "The main problem with this disc is that most of the artists simply don't do enough with the songs they're using to make it interesting."

John F. Butland believed most of the covers were better than the originals in his review for the magazine Exclaim!.

== Track listing ==
No.	Title	Performer(s)	Length
1.	"Band on the Run"	Owsley	5:14
2.	"My Brave Face"	SR-71	3:00
3.	"Junk"	Kevin Hearn, Steven Page and Stephen Duffy	2:56
4.	"Jet"	Semisonic	4:15
5.	"No More Lonely Nights"	The Merrymakers	4:11
6.	"Let Me Roll It"	Robyn Hitchcock	4:21
7.	"Too Many People"	The Finn Brothers	3:43
8.	"Dear Friend"	The Minus 5	4:45
9.	"Every Night"	Matthew Sweet	2:56
10.	"Waterfalls"	Sloan	4:21
11.	"Man We Was Lonely"	World Party	2:59
12.	"Coming Up"	John Faye Power Trip	3:43
13.	"Maybe I'm Amazed"	Virgos	4:14
14.	"Love in Song"	The Judybats	4:04
15.	"Warm and Beautiful"	Linus of Hollywood	3:08
16.	"Ram On"	They Might Be Giants	2:40
Total length:			60:30
