= Somewhere Under Wonderland =

Studio album by Counting Crows
- Released: September 2, 2014
- Recorded: December 2013 and February 2014
- Studio: Fantasy Recording Studios in Berkeley, California, United States
- Genre: Alternative rock, roots rock
- Length: 41:23
- Label: Capitol
- Producer: Brian Deck

Counting Crows chronology
Echoes of the Outlaw Roadshow (2013)	Somewhere Under Wonderland (2014)	Butter Miracle, Suite One (EP) (2021)

Singles from Somewhere Under Wonderland
- 1. "Palisades Park" Released: July 8, 2014; 2. "Scarecrow" Released: September 2, 2014; 3. "Earthquake Driver" Released: 2014

Somewhere Under Wonderland is the seventh studio album by American rock band Counting Crows, released on September 2, 2014 by Capitol Records. The album is the band's first album of original material in six years since 2008's Saturday Nights & Sunday Mornings and is their first release on Capitol. The release has received positive reviews from critics.

== Background, recording, and release ==
After parting with original label Geffen Records of 18 years in 2009, the band released two live albums and a studio album of cover songs independently. In 2013, while touring in the "Outlaw Roadshow"—a traveling festival show sponsored by the band in part with the music blog Ryan's Smashing Life—the band began to write new material. Duritz explained in concert that "God of Ocean Tides" was the first new song he'd written in years, and was inspired by leaving Nashville on their tour bus at two in the morning. After recording independently, they shopped the album around to eight or nine labels and finally signed with Capitol.

The album was promoted with a nationwide event that involved the band posting sidewalk chalk art by Chris Carlson onto their Facebook profile and rewarding the first fan to show up at that location with a copy of the album or concert tickets. The lead single from Somewhere Under Wonderland, entitled "Palisades Park", was released on July 8, 2014. It was followed by a second single, "Scarecrow". A concert tour followed.

== Critical reception ==
Professional ratings
Aggregate scores
Source	Rating
Metacritic	74/100
Review scores
Source	Rating
AllMusic	4/5 stars
Rolling Stone	3/5 stars
The Daily Telegraph	4/5 stars

Somewhere Under Wonderland has received mostly positive feedback from music critics. At Metacritic, they assign a "weighted average" rating out of 100 to selected independent ratings and reviews from mainstream critics, and the album has received a Metascore of a 74, based on 10 reviews, indicating "generally favorable reviews".

Fred Thomas of AllMusic rates the album four stars, calling "Somewhere Under Wonderland distinctively Counting Crows. Duritz's raspy voice and lucid, lyrical stories always hold just a hint of desperation, and even decades into a staggered career, these new tunes can't help but feel like part of a larger narrative that began during the band's '90s glory days but finds further, greater refinement here." In a three stars review on behalf of Rolling Stone, Jon Dolan writes how "Adam Duritz is still the same dreadlocked dreamer you remember from the Nineties, channeling Van Morrison, R.E.M. and Bruce Springsteen into word-zonked ballads that reference Jackie-O., Elvis, Johnny Appleseed and more." Helen Brown of The Daily Telegraph calls the album "their best collection of songs since their debut."

The album's cover is by artist Felipe Molina.

== Track listing ==
All lyrics are written by Adam Duritz.

Somewhere Under Wonderland track listing
No.	Title	Writer(s)	Length
1.	"Palisades Park"	Duritz	8:21
2.	"Earthquake Driver"	Duritz and David Immerglück	3:31
3.	"Dislocation"	Duritz, Immerglück, Millard Powers, and Dan Vickrey	4:55
4.	"God of Ocean Tides"	Duritz, Powers, and Vickrey	3:12
5.	"Scarecrow"	Duritz, Immerglück, Powers, and Vickrey	4:47
6.	"Elvis Went to Hollywood"	Duritz and Immerglück	3:56
7.	"Cover Up the Sun"	Duritz, Immerglück, Powers, and Vickrey	3:46
8.	"John Appleseed's Lament"	Duritz, Immerglück, Powers, and Vickrey	4:43
9.	"Possibility Days"	Duritz	4:12
Total length:			41:23

Deluxe edition with bonus tracks
No.	Title	Writer(s)	Length
10.	"Earthquake Driver" (Demo)	Duritz and Immerglück	3:30
11.	"Scarecrow" (Demo)	Duritz, Immerglück, Powers, and Vickrey	4:13
Total length:			49:09

== Personnel ==
Counting Crows

- Jim Bogios – drums, percussion, harmony vocals, hand claps on "Earthquake Driver"
- David Bryson – guitar, acoustic guitar, harmony vocals
- Adam Duritz – lead vocals, piano, harmony vocals
- Charlie Gillingham – keyboards, piano, Hammond B3 organ, Mellotron, harmony vocals
- David Immerglück – guitar, pedal steel guitar, mandolin, vocals, harmony vocals
- Millard Powers – bass guitar, harmony vocals
- Dan Vickrey – guitar, 12-string guitar, harmony vocals

Additional musicians

- Brian Deck – glockenspiel on "Palisades Park" and "God of Ocean Tides", hand claps on "Earthquake Driver", production, mixing at The Magic Shop in New York City in April 2014
- Eric Hillman – backing vocals on "Cover Up the Sun"
- Brian Holl – backing vocals on "Cover Up the Sun"
- John Paul Roney – backing vocals
- Chris Watson – trumpet on "Palisades Park"

Technical personnel

- Jason Butler – assistant engineering
- Greg Calbi – mastering at Sterling Sound in New York City
- Shawn Dealey – engineering
- Kabir Hermon – assistant engineering, engineering
- Albert Hernandez – assistant engineering
- Eric Hillman – vocal engineering
- Felipe Molina – art conception, paintings

== Chart performance and sales ==
Somewhere Under Wonderland debuted at No. 6 on the Billboard 200 chart, selling 32,000 copies in its first week. It marks the band's sixth top 10 album.

In Canada, the album debuted at No. 10 on the Canadian Albums Chart, selling 1,500 copies.

Chart performance for Somewhere Under Wonderland
Chart (2014)	Peak
Australian Albums (ARIA)	27
Belgian Albums (Ultratop Flanders)	27
Belgian Albums (Ultratop Wallonia)	69
Dutch Albums (Album Top 100)	12
German Albums (Offizielle Top 100)	56
Irish Albums (IRMA)	13
Italian Albums (FIMI)	22
Scottish Albums (OCC)	15
Swiss Albums (Schweizer Hitparade)	36
UK Albums (OCC)	15
US Billboard 200	6

== Release history ==
Release formats and details for Somewhere Under Wonderland
Region	Date	Format(s)	Label	Catalog
United States	September 2, 2014	Compact disc	Capitol	B002125202
United States	September 2, 2014	vinyl LP	Capitol	B002125301
United States	September 2, 2014	CD deluxe edition	Capitol	B002147880
United States	September 2, 2014	LP deluxe edition	Capitol	B002147880
Worldwide	September 2, 2014	digital download; streaming	Capitol	—
Australia	September 11, 2014	CD	Capitol	3791963
Canada	September 11, 2014	CD	Capitol	B002125402
Europe	September 11, 2014	CD	Capitol	0602537919284
Europe	September 12, 2014	CD deluxe edition	Capitol	0602537919635
Europe	September 12, 2014	LP deluxe edition	Capitol	00602537919291
Brazil	2014	CD	Capitol Records/Universal Music	060253791928
United States	June 28, 2018	LP blue vinyl Tour Edition	Capitol Records	BOO2125301
United States	2019	LP blue vinyl	Geffen Records	002847801
