= Shh =

Shh or Shhh or SHH may refer to:

== Arts and entertainment ==
=== Film and television ===
- Sh-h-h-h-h-h, a 1955 American cartoon directed by Tex Avery
- "Shh!", a television episode of Adventure Time
- Shh..., 2009 Indian film
- Shhh (film), a 1975 American comedy film starring Rita Moreno
- Shhh! (film), a 1993 Indian horror film starring Sadhu Kokila
- Shh. (2001 film), Australian short animated film directed by Adam Robb
- Ssshhhh...Koi Hai, an Indian horror television series
- Shinbi's Haunted House, an early title for The Haunted House

=== Literature ===
- Shhhhh! Everybody's Sleeping, a children's book by Julie Markes
- "Sshhh ...", a science fiction short story by David Brin

=== Music ===
==== Albums ====
- Shhh (Chumbawamba album), a 1992 album by English anarcho-punk band Chumbawamba
- Shhh! (Kumbia Kings album), a 2001 album by A.B. Quintanilla and Kumbia Kings
- Shhh... Don't Tell, a comedy album by Adam Sandler
- Shh, Just Go with It, a 2008 album by pop punk band Every Avenue
- Shhh!, a 2008 EP by Flying Lotus

==== Songs ====
- "Shh" (After School song), 2014
- "Shh" (Theo Evan song), 2025
- "Shh", by Frou Frou from Details, 2002
- "Shh", by Pentagon, 2023
- "Shh!", by Stand Atlantic from Pink Elephant, 2020
- "Shhh", by Bhad Bhabie from 15, 2018
- "Shhh", by Prince from The Gold Experience, 1995
- "Shhh!", by Koda Kumi from W Face: Inside/Outside, 2017
- "Shhh/Peaceful", by Miles Davis from the album In a Silent Way, 1969
- "Secret (Shh)", by Charli XCX from EP Vroom Vroom, 2016
- "Shhh!", by Viviz from EP Voyage, 2024
- "Shhh" (Kiss of Life song), 2023
- "Shit" (song) (censored Shhh...) by Future from Honest, 2013

==== Bands ====
- Sshh, an English rock duo featuring drummer Zak Starkey and Australian singer Sharna Sshh Liguz

== Places ==
- Shishmaref Airport (IATA and FAA LID codes: SHH), Alaska, US
- Sir Solomon Hochoy Highway, a freeway in Trinidad and Tobago
- South Harrow tube station (London Underground station code), England

== Other uses ==
- Shh, a request for silence
- Sshh Liguz (born 1984), stage name of Sharna Liguz, Australian musical artist
- Sonic hedgehog protein and gene
- Shoshoni language (ISO 639-3 alpha-3 code)
- Slater Hogg & Howison, a property services group in Scotland, owned by Countrywide
- SKYhigh Dominicana (ICAO: SHH), Dominican airlines

== See also ==
- SSH (disambiguation)
- SH (disambiguation)
