= SSH (disambiguation) =

SSH is the Secure Shell Protocol for secure data communication and remote command execution.

SSH may also refer to:

== Science and technology ==
- Saffir–Simpson hurricane scale, classifies hurricanes
- Sea-surface height, the topography of the ocean surface
- Social sciences and humanities, the disciplines and communities involved in or related to this area of research and science
- Suppression subtractive hybridization, a genetic technique to show differentially expressed genes
- Su–Schrieffer–Heeger model, a physical model for a simple model for a topological insulator

== Organizations ==
- SSH Communications Security, a Finnish company that developed the Secure Shell protocol
- Secondary State Highways, branches of Primary State Highways in Washington from 1937 to 1964
- Sharm El Sheikh International Airport (IATA airport code), an international airport in Egypt
- Silver State Helicopters, a helicopter operator

== Other uses ==
- Shihhi Arabic (ISO 639-3 code), a language
- South Superhighway (disambiguation)

== See also ==
- shh (disambiguation)
- SH (disambiguation)
