= Palisades Park =

Palisades Park may refer to:

- Palisades Park, New Jersey, a borough in Bergen County, New Jersey
- Palisades Amusement Park, a defunct amusement park in Bergen County, New Jersey
  - "Palisades Park" (Freddy Cannon song), 1962 recording inspired by the park
  - "Palisades Park" (Counting Crows song), 2014 recording inspired by the park
- Palisades Park (Santa Monica), a park along the Pacific coastline in Santa Monica, California

== See also ==
- Palisades Interstate Park Commission, joint New York and New Jersey commission to oversee parks along the Palisades on the west bank of the Hudson River
- Palisades Interstate Parkway, highway running north from the George Washington Bridge in Bergen County, New Jersey to Rockland County and Orange County in the state of New York
- Pacific Palisades, Los Angeles
