= SH1 =

SH1 or SH-1 may refer to:

- State Highway 1; see List of highways numbered 1
- SH1 (classification), a Paralympic shooting classification
- PCL-09, exported as SH1, a Chinese truck-mounted howitzer artillery system
- Silent Hill, the first video game of the Silent Hill franchise
- sh1, the first Sharpless catalog

== See also ==
- SH (disambiguation)
- SHA-1, a cryptographic hash function
