= Come Around (Counting Crows song) =

Single by Counting Crows

from the album Saturday Nights & Sunday Mornings
- Released: July 2008
- Genre: Rock
- Label: Geffen
- Songwriter(s): Jim Bogios, David Bryson, Adam Duritz, Charlie Gillingham, David Immerglück, Millard Powers, Dan Vickrey,
- Producer(s): Gil Norton

Counting Crows singles chronology
"You Can't Count On Me" (2008)	"Come Around" (2008)	"When I Dream of Michelangelo" (2008)

"Come Around" is the last song on Counting Crows' 2008 album Saturday Nights & Sunday Mornings.

Despite never issued as a physical single release, "Come Around" was serviced as an airplay single to the Adult Alternative radio format in summer 2008. It would go on to top the Billboard Triple A chart the week of September 27, 2008 (it remained the #1 single for three weeks) becoming the band's first chart-topper since "Accidentally in Love" in 2005.

Lead singer Adam Duritz reportedly was unhappy with the selection due to his belief that the decidedly more melodic mood of the track did not represent the mood of the album as a whole, preferring that a track from the edgier "Saturday Nights" half of the record be released instead.

== Song meaning ==
In early 2008, Duritz explained the meaning of the song in a live band performance:

It comes to the end of the record, and the last song is about having sort of decided that: “Look, if I’ve been through all this and I’ve come to here, then whatever that hurts, feeling is living. So if I’m still here and you’re still here, then we should go out and play some rock and roll. And it’s sort of a song of defiance about "hey, I’m still around."

However, Duritz has denied forthright the song is about redemption, and rather suggests a lasting heartache from a failed relationship.
