= The Romany Rye (disambiguation) =

The Romany Rye is an 1857 novel by George Borrow.

The Romany Rye may also refer to:

- The Romany Rye (band), an American indie band
- The Romany Rye (play), a play by George Robert Sims
