= 1492 (disambiguation) =

1492 was a year in the Julian calendar, most notable for being the year that Christopher Columbus sailed for America.

1492 may also refer to:

- 1492: Conquest of Paradise, a 1992 movie telling of Columbus's discovery of the new world
- 1492 epopea lirica d'America, an opera by Antonio Braga
- "1492" (song), a 2008 song by the band Counting Crows
- Papal conclave, 1492, a famous papal conclave that elected Alexander VI as Pope
- 1492 Pictures, a film production company owned by Chris Columbus
- 1492 Oppolzer, an asteroid
