= Ram On =

Ram On may refer to:

- Ram-On, a moshav in the Ta'anakh region
- "Ram On" (song), a 1971 song by Paul McCartney from his Ram album
