= Evan Olson =

American musician

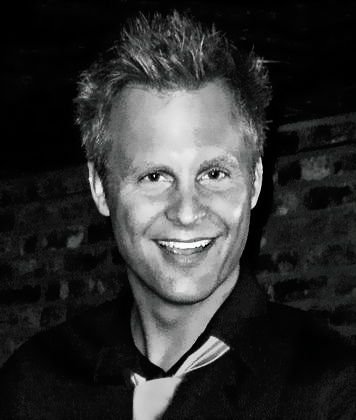
- Olson in 2010

Background information
- Born: Evan Scott Olson; 1967 (age 58–59)
- Genres: Rock, new wave, pop
- Occupations: Musician, singer-songwriter
- Instruments: Guitar, drums, bass
- Years active: 1986–present
- Label: LoveCat Music
- Website: evanolson.com

Evan Scott Olson (born 1967) is an American rock singer and songwriter based in Greensboro, North Carolina. Professionally known since the early 2000s for his work as a songwriter for film and television, Olson received renewed interest in his earlier independent recording when one of his songs was the subject of a musical mystery featured on the podcast Reply All.

== Early life ==
Evan Scott Olson was born in West Point, New York during the “Summer Of Love.” His father was an officer in the Army Corps of Engineers. After moving from base-to-base for the first 12 years of his life, Olson's father retired and settled the family in North Carolina. In 1986 Olson enrolled at the University of North Carolina in Greensboro, where he earned a degree in psychology. In 1988, while still in school he formed a band called The DT's with brothers Ben and Chuck Folds, and then joined Ben Folds' funk-rock/power-pop band Majosha that Folds had founded with Millard Powers and Eddie Walker. The group released the album Shut Up and Listen to Majosha in 1989 before disbanding.

After Majosha, Olson and Ben Folds briefly formed the trio Pots and Pans with guitarist Britt "Snüzz" Uzzell before Folds departed to start his own Ben Folds Five who would go on to record some of Majosha's material cowritten by Olson. Meanwhile, Olson and Uzzell recruited Eddie Walker and Chuck Folds for their new project, initially called Straight Ahead. For legal reasons they soon changed the band's name to Bus Stop and went on to release two albums of songs. In 1992 Bus Stop entered and won Dick Clark's USA Music Challenge contest.

== Career ==
In the late 1990s Olson took to recording all of his own songs as a solo artist at home, playing and multitracking each instrument himself. A demo recording garnered him a deal with Universal Music who released his home demos as the album One Room in 1999. After Universal gave the album limited promotion and pushed back its release date, label representatives asked Olson to bolster sales through word-of-mouth marketing before eventually dropping him as an artist. After his brief tenure with Universal, Olson returned to self-releasing his albums through his own label, Explosive Entertainment.

While still in Bus Stop, Olson had started working with advertising production company Radio Kings through which he wrote jingles for Hershey's chocolates, Mercedes-Benz, and other smaller companies. By the early 2000s Olson had established himself as a songwriter for film and television through the independent label and publisher LoveCat Music. With LoveCat's backing, Olson wrote, performed and produced his songs for Sex and the City, Dawson's Creek, The American Embassy, Felicity, Third Watch, Just Deal, 90210, Friday Night Lights, In America, Scooby-Doo, Ugly Betty, One Tree Hill, My Boss's Daughter, Laguna Beach, Real Sex, and MTV's The Hills. In 2012, his song "Another Sunny Day" was featured in the movie Diary of a Wimpy Kid: Dog Days. Olson is also the main composer for the show Tech Toys 360, on Velocity TV, and the DVD edition for the pilot and first season of Baywatch, Olson's song "Strong Enough" replaced Kim Carnes' theme song originally used during show's original broadcast.

After the 2008 economic crisis Olson economized his live performances by playing either as a solo artist or in more stripped-down coffeehouse acts instead of larger rock bands. He formed the duo Evan and Dana with upright bassist Dana Bearror, and another duo stylized as AM rOdeO with his partner Jessica Mashburn on keyboards and vocals. Both projects play sets of mostly cover songs for the bistro crowd, with some original songs as well. Throughout the 2010s Olson also played occasional reunion gigs with Ben Folds and the members of Bus Stop.

In 2020 Olson's 1999 single "So Much Better" was featured as a mysterious earworm in an episode of the podcast Reply All. Podcast host PJ Vogt recruited a group of musicians into a studio to re-create the song based on the guidance of one person who had heard the song on the radio more than 20 years earlier. In revealing the identity of "So Much Better"'s songwriter, the podcast episode revived listener interest in Olson's would-be hit beyond the limited airplay it had received back in the late 1990s. A subsequent uptick in plays on Spotify and YouTube prompted Universal Music to release Olson's 1999 album One Room on Apple Music.

== Personal life ==
Olson was briefly married and divorced in the 1990s. He now lives with fellow musician and DJ Jessica Mashburn.

== Discography ==
=== Solo albums ===
- One Room (Universal, 1999)
- Olson (LoveCat, 2000)
- All You Desire (2001)
- Red (LoveCat, 2002)
- Club Evos (LoveCat, 2003)
- Audio (LoveCat, 2004)
- Take the World (LoveCat, 2005)
- All the Way (as Able to Fly; LoveCat, 2006)
- Eternal Bliss (Explosive Entertainment, 2012)
- Evan Scott Olson (Independent, 2025)

=== With Majosha ===
- Shut Up and Listen to Majosha (Fresh Avery Records, 1989)

=== With Bus Stop ===
- Miracle Time (Ripe & Ready, 1992)
- A Little Faster (Ripe & Ready/AMP, 1995)
- Ball & Chain compilation (LoveCat, 2000)

=== Compilations ===
- A Day at the Beach soundtrack (2000)
- Pure Disco with a Touch of Funk (2006)

=== Singles ===
- "So Much Better" (Universal, 1999)
- "A Million Things" (Universal, 2000)
- "Everybody Loves Me" (LoveCat, 2008)
- "Another Sunny Day" (Explosive Entertainment, 2012)
- "Begin Again" (2016)
- "You're A Star" (2016)
- "Shine On Me" (w/ Jessica Mashburn, 2019)
- "My Christmas Angel" (2019)
- "Your Spell" (2019)
- "Summertime Groove" (2019)
- "Right Or Wrong" (2021)
