= Got to Be Tough (Toots and the Maytals album) =

Studio album by Toots and the Maytals
- Released: 28 August 2020
- Studios: Reggae Center, Jamaica
- Genres: Reggae; rocksteady; ska; R&B
- Length: 41:26
- Labels: Trojan Jamaica, BMG
- Producers: Toots Hibbert, co-producers: Nigel Burrell, Zak Starkey, Youth

Toots and the Maytals chronology
Pressure Drop – The Golden Tracks (2011)	Got to Be Tough (2020)

Got to Be Tough is a studio album by Jamaican reggae band Toots and the Maytals. It was released through Trojan Jamaica/BMG on 28 August 2020 and financed by Trojan Jamaica owner Zak Starkey, who also played guitar for the recording. The album is the first studio release from Toots and the Maytals in more than a decade and the first after an accident wherein bandleader Toots Hibbert was hit in the head with a glass bottle, leading to his hiatus from performing. The lyrical content of the album is political, featuring pleas for unity among people.

Got to Be Tough was the band's final studio release before Hibbert's death on 11 September 2020 due to complications from COVID-19. After his death, the album won the Grammy Award for Best Reggae Album at the 63rd Annual Grammy Awards.

== Critical reception ==
Professional ratings
Aggregate scores
Source	Rating
AnyDecentMusic?	7.1/10
Metacritic	74/100
Review scores
Source	Rating
AllMusic	4/5 stars
And It Don't Stop	A−
The Arts Desk	4/5 stars
Crack Magazine	6/10
Exclaim!	7/10
Gigwise	9/10 stars
NME	3/5 stars
The Observer	3/5 stars
Pitchfork	6.5/10
Rolling Stone	4/5 stars

Got to Be Tough was met with generally positive reviews. At Metacritic, which assigns a normalized rating out of 100 to reviews from professional critics, the album received an average score of 74, based on 10 reviews. Reviewing in his "Consumer Guide" column, Robert Christgau said, "What I like about these [songs], and Starkey must have too, is how conscious they are. Having long favored danceable love songs, [Hibbert] spends most [of] these 36 minutes looking time tough in its ugly face. 'Just Brutal,' 'Warning Warning,' and 'Got to Be Tough'; bus fares, low wages, invisible pensions, and picking yourself up off the ground. But he's also proud to stand accused for feeding his enemies." Tom Dibb from Gigwise wrote that the album "calls the world to task, and has them dancing all the while", describing it as "politically minded, brutally honest but maintaining the heartfelt and soulful nature of rocksteady and ska". Variety magazine's Steve Bloom also applauded Hibbert's messages of optimism on songs that "alternate between reggae and R&B".

== Track listing ==
Got to Be Tough track listing
No.	Title	Music	Length
1.	"Drop Off Head"	Frederick Hibbert	3:52
2.	"Just Brutal"	Hibbert	3:35
3.	"Got to Be Tough"	Hibbert	4:06
4.	"Freedom Train"	Hibbert	3:41
5.	"Warning Warning"	Hibbert	3:54
6.	"Good Thing That You Call"	Hibbert	3:02
7.	"Stand Accused"	Hibbert	3:23
8.	"Three Little Birds" (featuring Ziggy Marley)	Bob Marley	5:20
9.	"Having a Party"	Hibbert	5:21
10.	"Struggle"	Hibbert	5:12
Total length:			41:26

== Personnel ==
- Producer: Frederick "Toots" Hibbert
- Co-producers: Nigel Burrell, Zak Starkey, Martin "Youth" Glover

Other - credits taken from AllMusic:

- Nigel Burrell – drum programming, engineer, harmony
- Tomas Crow – engineer
- Lisa Davis – harmony
- Sly Dunbar – drums
- Latoya Hall-Downer – harmony
- Carl Harvey – guitar
- Frederick "Toots" Hibbert – bass, composer, drums, guitar, harmony, keyboards, vocals
- Leba Hibbert – harmony
- Stewart Hurwood – guitar technician
- Sharna Liguz – cover art concept
- Gavin Lurssen – mastering
- Bob Marley – composer
- Ziggy Marley – featured artist, vocals
- Dario Morgan – guitar
- Cyril Neville – percussion
- Max Noise – engineer
- Conrad Pinnock – saxophone
- Delroy "Fatta" Pottinger – engineer
- Michael Rendall – engineer
- Dwight Richards – trumpet
- Nambo Robinson – trombone
- Dave Sardy – mixing
- Sheldon Palmer – saxophone
- Sshh – editing
- Zak Starkey – editing, guitar
- Ringo Starr – tambourine
- Steven Stewart – keyboards
- Bruce Sugar – engineer
- Toots & the Maytals – primary artist
- Twiggy – harmony
- Dale Voelker – design, illustrations
- Hopeton Williams – trumpet
