= Owsley (musician) =

American musician (1966–2010)

Will Owsley
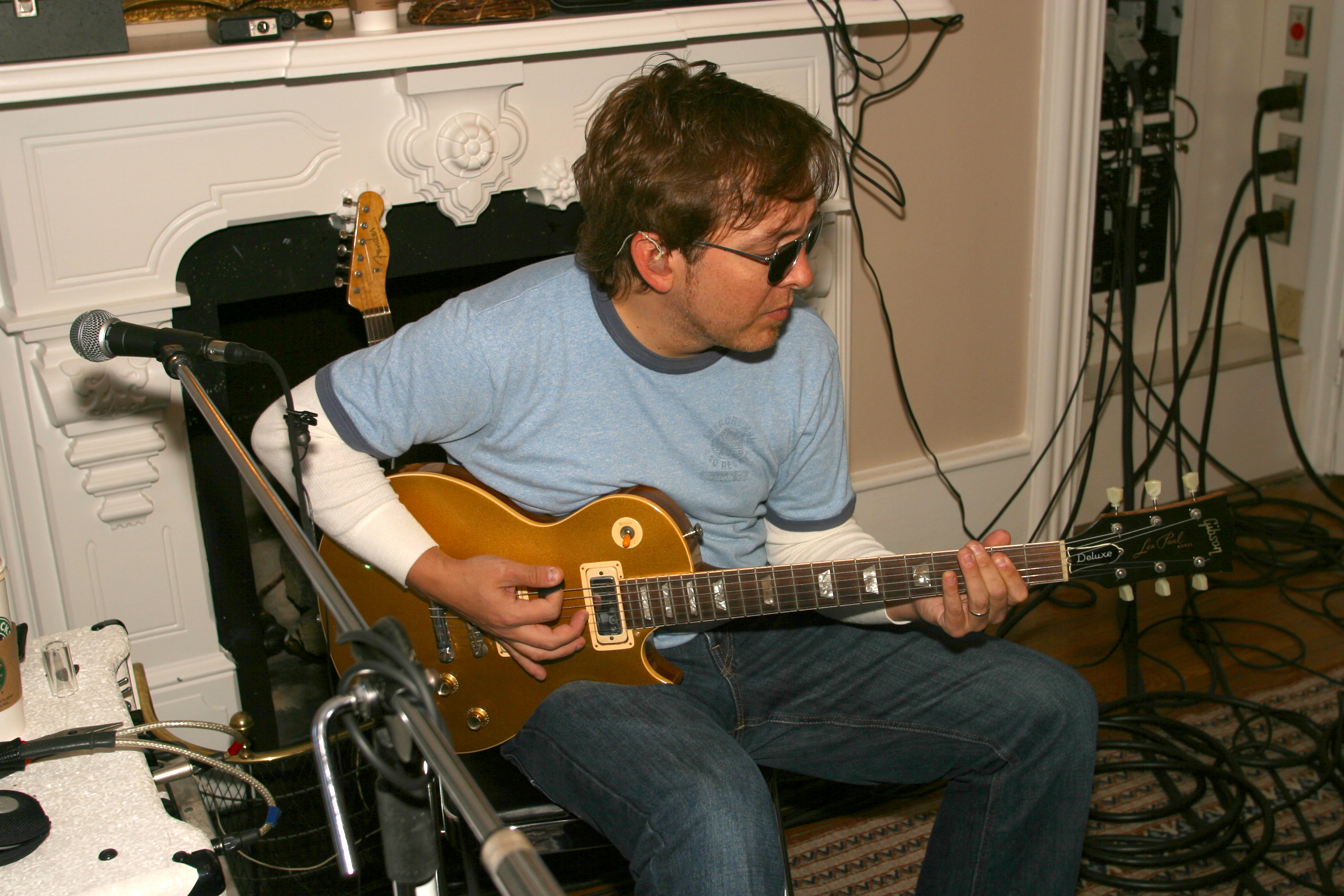
- Owsley recording in 2004.

Background information
- Also known as: Owsley
- Born: William Reese Owsley III; March 6, 1966; Anniston, Alabama, U.S.
- Died: April 30, 2010 (aged 44) Franklin, Tennessee, U.S.
- Genres: Power pop, rock, bluegrass
- Occupations: Singer-songwriter, guitarist, record producer, recording engineer
- Instruments: Vocals, guitar, bass, piano, mandolin, pedal steel, mellotron
- Years active: 1985–2010
- Labels: Not Lame Recordings, Giant Records, Lakeview Entertainment, UMe Digital
- Formerly of: The Semantics

William Reese Owsley III (March 6, 1966 – April 30, 2010), known professionally as Owsley, was an American singer and songwriter. His two solo albums won critical acclaim, and his debut album was nominated for a Grammy Award, as was the song "Threaten Me With Heaven". Owsley was also a record producer, a recording engineer, and the guitarist in Amy Grant's touring band.

== Early life and influences ==
Owsley was born and raised in Anniston, Alabama, in a musical household. His father was the drum major of the Million Dollar Band, the marching band of the University of Alabama; his mother was a singer and stage actress; his sister was a classically trained pianist, and his brother was a rock guitarist. Owsley graduated from the Rectory School and attended the Blue Ridge School.

He was a guitarist and singer in the Southeastern rock club band Baghdad in the mid-80s that played both covers and original work, before moving to Nashville, Tennessee, in 1987.

Owsley started playing guitar at age nine. He was a fan of Kiss and of Todd Rundgren, but mostly practiced Eddie Van Halen and Steve Morse licks note-for-note. With his father's mentorship, he played snare drum in the Anniston High School marching band, while continuing his passion for guitar, playing in his high school jazz band and in top-40 cover bands at local venues. With his brother, he would play in the band Stormfront. The songs he started writing himself were more in the style of The Beatles. As a guitarist, he also cited influences such as Chet Atkins, Jimi Hendrix and Robert Johnson.

== Career ==
=== Early career and The Semantics (1986–1998) ===
Prior to developing his own band and solo work, he was added to the band of Judson Spence, appeared in his various videos on MTV, and was part of Spence's groundbreaking Nashville showcases that landed him 14 label offers. Nashville music executive Scott Siman encouraged Owsley to pursue his own writing and performing, which is why he declined an offer by Amy Grant in the late 1980s to become her guitarist.

Together with Millard Powers, he founded the power pop band The Semantics, which included Jody Spence and Ringo Starr's son, Zak Starkey. They were signed to Geffen Records by John Kalodner. The band recorded an album entitled Powerbill in 1993, which was never released in the U.S for being "too pop for alternative and too alternative for pop." It eventually got distributed in Japan in 1996. Fine-tuning the album under the tutelage of producer and manager Peter Asher for four years taught him much about the production process and about management. Suddenly being dropped from the label left the band members destitute and broke.

Amy Grant turned out to have heard tapes of The Semantics and she contacted Owsley in 1994 to let him know how much she liked it, and to ask him to join her as her guitarist on the House of Love tour. Owsley would subsequently hold the position of tour guitarist for 16 years, until his death. He would later also co-write and record various songs with her. Through his work with producer Mutt Lange, Owsley was introduced to Shania Twain. Over the years, he would tour with her as guitarist and harmony singer, with appearances on many national television shows and awards programs. Owsley went on to work with many mainstream and Christian artists, often in the country genre. During the 1990s, he among others worked with Vince Gill, Michael W. Smith, Chris Rodriguez, dc Talk (for whom he also produced), the Neville Brothers, Vanessa L. Williams, and Wynonna.

=== Solo albums (1998–2005) ===
==== Owsley (1999) ====
With the money he earned working with Amy Grant and Shania Twain, he bought a house in Green Hills, Tennessee, and in it built a home recording studio. In 1998, it led to the release of his self-titled solo album distributed by Not Lame Recordings. It was co-produced by Millard Powers and Jeff Balding. Doug Morris of Universal Music Group picked it and proposed the album to be rerecorded, but Owsley insisted that it simply needed to be remixed by either Tom Lord-Alge, Bob Clearmountain or Andy Wallace. Tom Lord-Alge signed on, together with J.R. McNeely. The eponymous album Owsley got re-released on March 23, 1999, under Giant Records.

Many of the songs on the album are about Anniston, Alabama, where he was born and lived until he was 21, and his longing for the town. With the first single off the album being "Coming Up Roses", Owsley sent the entire staff of Giant a red rose and a Valentine's Day card, expressing his hopes that things were "coming up roses" for all. The single didn't catch on, but "I'm Alright" later did score a minor hit. Recorded almost entirely on a vintage Studer A-80 (2-inch, 16-track of which one defective) tape machine in his home studio on Hobbs Road in Nashville, Tennessee, it garnered him a Grammy Award nomination for Best Engineered Album. The album would be labeled one of the best pop records of the 1990s. During the ensuing tour, he among others joined the Pat McGee Band and Fountains of Wayne, whose bassist Adam Schlesinger Owsley recorded with in later years.

==== The Hard Way (2004) ====
Owsley released his second album, The Hard Way, on the indie record label Lakeview Entertainment on February 24, 2004, five years after his first solo album. It was ready in 2003, but got delayed in part due to legal difficulties with his former label, Giant Records. The album had a heavier and more mature sound compared to his debut. Be With You was chosen as single, but despite some rotation on triple-A radio stations, it never reached the greater audience. The album was recorded over the span of three years, using a variety of recording formats, in his new home studio in Franklin, Tennessee, and a number of studios in Tennessee. Owsley played multiple roles on it, including that of producer. It was entirely mixed by Paul David Hager, and dedicated to Owsley's maternal grandmother, the late Alys O. Boozer. A cover of Paul McCartney's "Band on the Run", which Owsley recorded for a 2001 tribute album, was included as a hidden track.

==== Psycho / Upside Down (2005) ====
In 2004, he entered into an agreement with UMe Digital, a new label in the Universal Music Group, and the first major label to distribute music only through digital downloads. It led to the release of the combined single Psycho / Upside Down in 2005. That same year, Owsley contributed the cover song "Got a Lot on My Head" to Substitution Mass Confusion, a tribute album in honor of The Cars.

=== Session work (2005–2010) ===
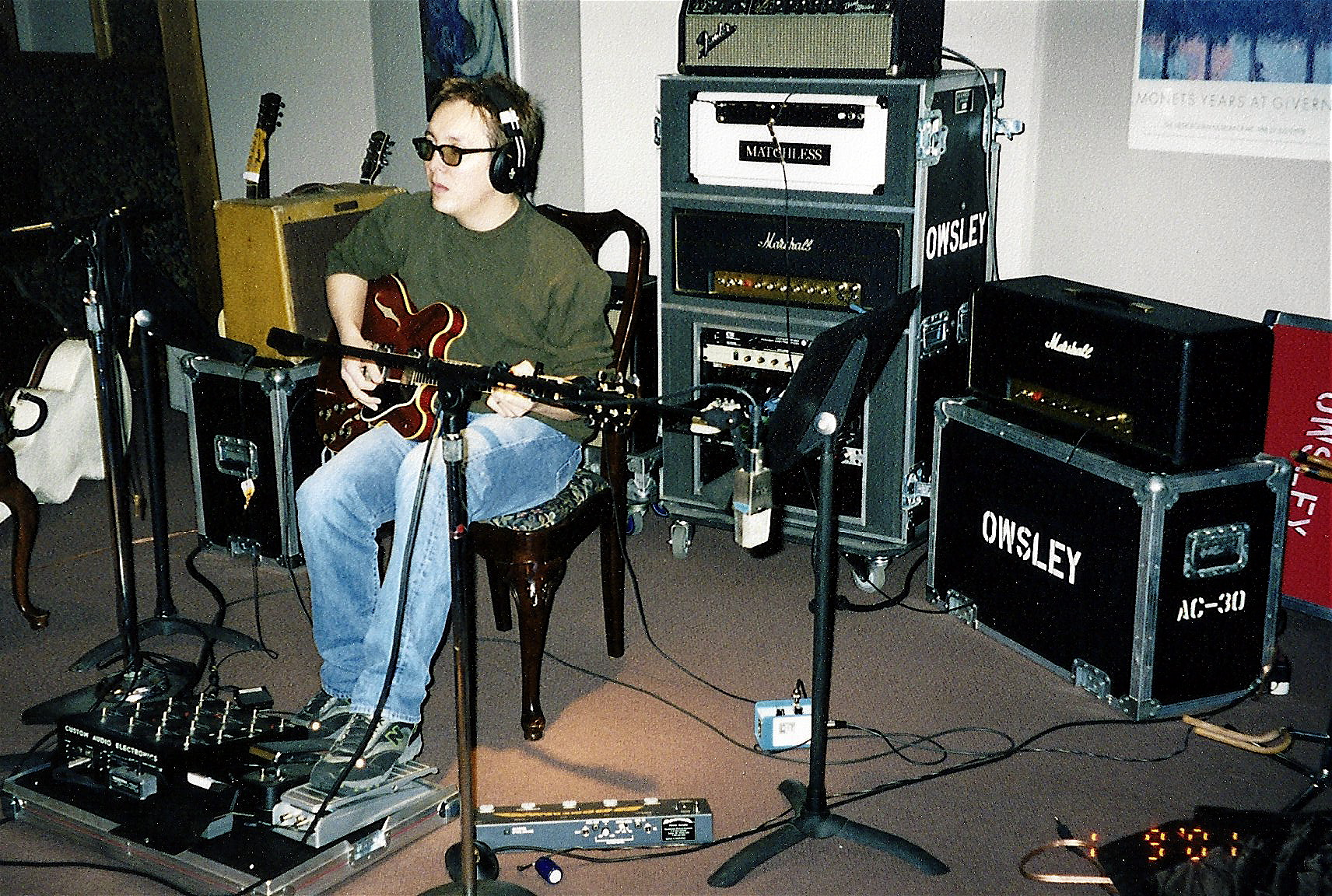
Will Owsley laying down a guitar track at the Bennett House studio.

In the 2000s (decade), Owsley continued work as a session guitarist, (backing) vocalist, mandolin player and less frequently as bassist and keyboardist. He among others recorded with Faith Hill, Michael McDonald, Charlotte Church, Jump5, Natalie Grant, David Phelps, James Ingram, Rodney Crowell, MercyMe, The Katinas, Nate Sallie, Graham Colton, and Kenny Loggins. Producer John Fields arranged for Owsley to back various Disney stars, such as Miley Cyrus, Selena Gomez, Demi Lovato, the Jonas Brothers, and Luke Benward.

Besides being a musician, Owsley also continued producing and engineering. He co-produced Kevin Max's 2007 album The Blood and toured with him. He played various instruments on Chris Sligh's 2008 album Running Back to You and produced several songs on it. In the last two years of his life, Owsley occasionally worked as a session guitarist for Andy Sturmer's movie soundtracks. In 2009, Owsley made a version of "When Lonely Comes Around" (Grant/Owsley), sung and recorded by himself, available to fans for free. Also in 2009, Owsley co-produced and played on Popfilter Boston's debut release Pop This.

== Personal life ==
In sports, Owsley was a University of Alabama football fan. He played soccer and lacrosse and competed in cross country running in his formative years. As an adult, Owsley was a golfer and tennis player, as well as a table tennis and billiard player. Whenever he was on tour and playing a club that had a billiard table, he'd often pick-up a game prior to going on stage to perform. He was also a horseman and owned several Tennessee Walking Horses over the years.

Owsley had a passion for telling jokes. He was widely known for his sense of humor, as well as being a terrific mimic, skilled at closely imitating people. He also was a fan of card tricks and coin illusion tricks and worked for years to hone his skills in illusion. Whenever he was in Los Angeles, he frequently visited the Magic Castle, located in Hollywood.

Owsley was an American Civil War buff. He was very knowledgeable on the subject and loved to interact with others who were interested in it as well. On many occasions, he helped to reenact specific battles.

Owsley was a Christian and was a member of the Village Chapel in Nashville, TN.

Owsley was an collector of vintage guitars, amplifiers, microphones and mic preamps for his studio.

== Death ==
Owsley died on April 30, 2010, at Williamson County Hospital in Franklin, Tennessee. He was 44. The Tennessean reported the cause of death was "an apparent suicide." He is survived by his two sons Walker (born 1998) and Liam (born 2001) from his previous marriage with Rebecca Walker.

In 2011, Vince Gill released the song "Threaten Me With Heaven", which was co-written with Amy Grant, Owsley and Dillon O'Brian. It was nominated for the 2012 Grammy Awards in the category of "Best Country Song", which according to Gill is "a lasting tribute to Owsley" and "would have meant the world to him". The song was recorded prior to Owsley's death and was also performed at Owsley's funeral.

== Discography ==
The Semantics

- 1996: Powerbill

Owsley solo

- 1999: Owsley
- 2004: The Hard Way
- 2005: Psycho / Upside Down (digital download only)

== Cover versions by other artists ==
- Avalon recorded Be With You for their 2004 album The Creed under the title I Wanna Be With You. The lyrics were slightly altered.
- Trevor Morgan, who toured with Owsley as bassist, recorded his own version of Upside Down (Morgan, Dillon O'Brian, Owsley) as the opening track for Wonderlight (2004).
