= Majosha =

American alternative rock band

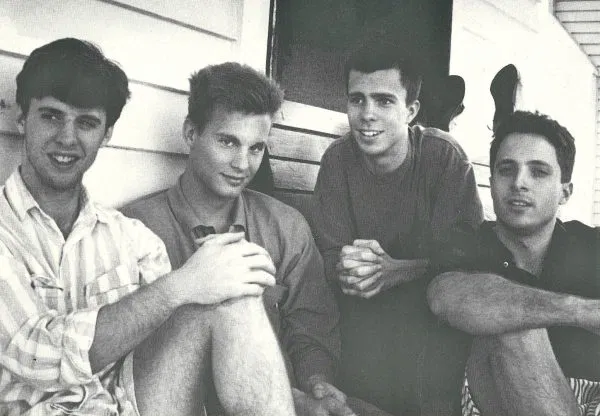
- A promotional photo of Majosha, circa 1989

Background information
- Origin: Winston-Salem, North Carolina, U.S.
- Genres: Alternative rock, indie rock, power pop
- Years active: 1988–1990
- Label: Fresh Avery Records
- Past members: Ben Folds; Millard Powers; Evan Olson; Dave Rich; Eddie Walker; Chris Brown

Majosha (formerly stylized as Majôsha) was an American alternative rock band formed around early 1988 in Winston-Salem, North Carolina. It featured Ben Folds on bass and keyboards, Millard Powers on guitar, Evan Olson on guitar, and Eddie Walker on drums. They released a self-produced EP, Party Night: Five Songs About Jesus in 1988, which contained four tracks, none of which were about Jesus. After gaining popularity, they released their first and only studio album, Shut Up and Listen to Majosha in 1989. The band disbanded in early 1990 and the members went on to pursue other projects.

== History ==
=== The band ===
Formed in the spring of 1988, Majôsha (pronounced ma-JOSH-a) featured Millard Powers on guitar and lead vocals, Dave Rich on drums, and Folds on bass. At the time, paying gigs had a preference for bass players who could slap, so Folds picked up the technique quickly and it became a mainstay in the sound of the band. Their first gig was at Duke University's Battle of the Bands, which they won. Folds approached soul singer-songwriter Evan Olson to join the band later that year. They played at bars and fraternity parties, and self produced Party Night: Five Songs About Jesus, which they sold locally.

Party Night was followed by their debut studio album Shut Up and Listen to Majosha (1989) under the label Fresh Avery Records. It contained, among other tracks, the four songs from Party Night (remixed and/or re-recorded). Every song was written and produced by Folds and Powers, with the exception of Emaline, which was co-written by Olson. Folds also played all bass, keys, and drums on the album except for the track "We Know", on which Chris "Hound Dog" Brown played drums. The album never made it to CD and was only ever released on cassette and vinyl.

After the release of Shut Up and Listen to Majosha in 1989, a dance mix of Get That Bug titled Get That Bug (Outta Your System) was recorded at the Hit Factory and released as a promotional CD exclusively in Japan. Around this time, Hound Dog left the band and, after a rotating cast of drummers, Eddie Walker came on board for the touring band.

The songs "Emaline" and "Video" were later re-recorded and appeared on Ben Folds Five albums, and "Kalamazoo" was released on the Folds solo EP Super D. Other songs from the album such as "Clueless", "Guilty", and "Where's Bohemia" have also been demoed by Folds.

=== Following the break-up ===
The band broke up in early 1990, and Ben quickly formed the short-lived Pots & Pans with himself on drums, Evan Olson on bass, and Britt “Snüzz” Uzzell on guitar and vocals. The debut Majosha album was re-issued as a Pots & Pans album while the band recorded a demo tape. The band only lasted about a month, and Olson and Snüzz went on to form Bus Stop with Folds' brother, Chuck Folds, on bass, and Eddie Walker on drums. They have independently released 4 CDs.

Folds went on to form the alternative rock band Ben Folds Five with Robert Sledge and Darren Jessee in 1993, with whom he released 4 studio albums. Outside of the band Folds has pursued a successful solo career and collaborated with artists such as Amanda Palmer, William Shatner, Regina Spektor, "Weird Al" Yankovic, and yMusic. He has also continued to work with former Majosha and Pots & Pans members.

After the break-up of Bus Stop, Powers has released a eponymous solo album, and has been the bassist of Counting Crows since 2008, appearing on every record since the departure of Matt Malley. Evan Olson, Snüzz, and Chuck Folds have also since pursued respective solo careers.
