= Engine 88 =

American rock band

- Origin: San Francisco, California, U.S.
- Genres: Rock, indie, alternative
- Years active: 1992–1998, 2006, 2017
- Labels: Shut Up & Drive, Caroline, Wingnut
- Members: Tom Barnes; Damon Wood; Eric Knight; Dave Hawkins
- Website: engine88.net

Engine 88 was an American rock band that spawned out of the San Francisco Bay Area in the 1990s.

== History ==
Engine 88 (originally known as simply Engine) released three albums and a handful of seven-inch singles throughout the 1990s. The band featured Tom Barnes of the notable college rock band Sordid Humor as lead singer, Damon Wood of Smoking Section on guitar, Eric Knight on bass and Dave Hawkins (also of Smoking Section) on the drums.

Their first 7 inch singles release, Funny Car was put out independently on their own label, Shut Up and Drive in 1993. In 1995, their first full length LP, Clean Your Room was released on Caroline Records, defining their characteristic sound of driving guitars and rhythms counter-acted with introspective and often abstract lyrics. Clean your Room peaked at #42 on the CMJ Top 200 chart.

1997's Snowman followed, to much critical acclaim. Stephen Thompson of The A.V. Club praised the album, writing that it "flat-out rocks, with 38 minutes of smart lyrics, driving guitars, and hyper-infectious choruses." He also noted that "singer Tom Barnes has a distinctively cracked lyrical style, and in an ideal world, it’d make him a star."

In 1998 the group disbanded and their final full-length, Flies and Death n' Stuff was released posthumously in 1998 on Wingnut Records.

Engine 88 reunited for a performance at Bottom of the Hill in San Francisco on October 27, 2006, to celebrate the release of their friends’ book Every Day Is Saturday by photographer Peter Ellenby.

At the prompting of Jawbreaker, Engine 88 agreed to reunite for an appearance at Chicago's Riot Fest on September 17, 2017.

== Where are they now? ==
Singer Tom Barnes released a CD entitled Three Day Ditties, which abandoned the louder rock sound of Engine 88, in favor of a more soft rock sound similar to that of his former project, Sordid Humor. His songs have gained a cult following and have been covered live by the band Counting Crows.

In August 2024, Barnes released Last Ride of Mercury Man to streaming formats.

Guitarist Damon Wood is now a software engineer at Pandora performing in a Pretenders tribute band, Message of Love, and in an R&B cover band, Curtis Bumpy, in the San Francisco Bay Area.

Bassist Eric Knight works at UC Berkeley and trains and coaches martial arts at SBG NorCal.

Drummer, Dave Hawkins, opened a popular movie rental store, Lost Weekend Video, in San Francisco, with Christy Colcord, who previously booked European tours for many US punk bands (including Green Day), and Adam Pfahler of Jawbreaker.

== Band members ==
- Tom Barnes (vocals, guitar)
- Damon Wood (guitar)
- Eric Knight (bass)
- Dave Hawkins (drums)

== Albums ==
Title	Album details
Clean Your Room	Released: June 6, 1995; Label: Caroline Records; Formats: LP, CD
Snowman	Released: January 14, 1997; Label: Caroline Records; Formats: CD

== Singles ==
Title	Single details
Funny Car	Released: 1993; Label: Shut Up and Drive; Formats: 7-inch
20 / She Breaks a Bottle	Released: 1994; Label: No Life Records; Formats: 7-inch
Robots Are Real – Split w/ American Sensei	Released: 1995; Label: Hep-Cat; Formats: 7-inch
Funny Car – Split w/ Sincola	Released: 1996; Label: Caroline Records; Formats: 7-inch
Seconal	Released: 1997; Label: Caroline Records; Formats: 7-inch
Manclub	Released: 1997; Label: Caroline Records; Formats: 7-inch

== Samplers / Various Artists ==
Song	Compilation	Format	Label	Year
GTO	Various – Germ's Choice '94	CD, Compilation	911 Records	1994
Spinach	Various – CMJ New Music Monthly Volume 23 July 1995	CD, Compilation, Promo	College Music Journal	1995
Spinach	Various – Caroline Records' Bowling Team Sampler	CD, Compilation, Promo	Caroline Records	1995
Mangos	Various – hu H (CD 8)	CD, Compilation	Huh Music Service	1995
Mangos	Various – Babe, You're No. 1	CD, Compilation, Promo	Hits	1995
Spinach	Various – CMJ Music Sampler – Hooked	CD, Compilation, Promo	Sony Music Publishing	1995
Mangos	Various – Indie-Gestion 9	CD, Album, Compilation	Alternative Press	1995
Seconal	Various – How Low Can A Punk Get?	CD, Compilation, Promo, Sampler	Caroline Records	1996
Funny Car	Various – Wild Promotions Compilation Volume 2	CD, Compilation, Promo, Sampler	Wild	1996
Manclub	Various – Live 105 10 Year Anniversary: 1986–1996	CD, Compilation	Live 105	1996
Seconal	Various – Killing Cuts 1	CD, Compilation, Cardsleeve	Metal Hammer	1997
Manclub	Various – Virtually Alternative 77	2×CD, Compilation, Promo	The Album Network	1997
Ballerina	Various – Vital Distribution At London Music Week	CD, Compilation, Promo	Vital	1997
Fire	Various – Blind Herd Of Sheep: A Compilation Of Berkeley High Bands	CD, Compilation	El Sabado Records	1999
Get Off	Various – For Callum	2×CD, Compilation	Catlick Records / The Cultural Society / Letterbox	2007
Mangos	Various – Virtually Alternative 60	2×CD, Compilation, Promo	The Album Network	Unknown
