= You Can't Count On Me =

Single by Counting Crows

from the album Saturday Nights & Sunday Mornings
- Released: March 25, 2008
- Genre: Rock
- Label: Geffen
- Songwriters: Jim Bogios, David Bryson, Adam Duritz, Charlie Gillingham, Millard Powers, Dan Vickrey
- Producer: Brian Deck

Counting Crows singles chronology
"1492" (2008)	"You Can't Count On Me" (2008)	"Come Around" (2008)

"You Can't Count On Me" is the second single and lead commercial single released by Counting Crows from their album Saturday Nights & Sunday Mornings.

== Critical reception ==
Billboard magazine gave the single three-and-a-half stars, calling it "a pleasant surprise" and saying "Duritz's vocals are still more whiny than soulful, but he can deliver a lyrical twist like he's holding an ice pick."

"You Can't Count On Me," was released to radio stations on February 4, 2008. A music video for the song was released on March 20, 2008. To promote the album, the band performed on Private Sessions, Good Morning America, Late Show with David Letterman, The View and The Late Late Show with Craig Ferguson.

Frontman Adam Duritz has stated in concert that the song is about "people mistaking you for a dependable guy".

== Charts ==
Chart (2008)	Peak Position
U.S. Billboard Adult Alternative Songs	1
U.S. Billboard Adult Top 40	35
U.S. Billboard Pop 100	80
