= Shut Up and Listen to Majosha =

Studio album by Majosha
- Released: 1989
- Recorded: 1988–1989
- Studios: TGS Studio, Omnitrax Studio, Greensboro, NC
- Genres: Rock; funk rock; power pop; jangle pop
- Length: 38:11
- Label: Fresh Avery Records
- Producers: Ben Folds; Millard Powers

Shut Up and Listen to Majosha is Majosha's first and only full-length album, released in 1989. This album never made it to CD, and was only ever available on vinyl and cassette. All songs were written by Ben Folds and Millard Powers except "Emaline", written by both Ben Folds and Evan Olson. Songs "Emaline" and "Video" later appeared on Ben Folds Five albums, and "Kalamazoo" was released on the Folds solo EP Super D.

== Track listing ==
=== Vinyl version ===
All tracks are written by Ben Folds, except for "Emaline", co-written with Evan Olson.

Side A
No.	Title	Lead vocals	Length
1.	"Where's Bohemia"	Olson; Millard Powers	3:26
2.	"Clueless"	Powers; Olson	2:30
3.	"Emaline"	Powers	3:08
4.	"Guilty"	Folds	4:00
5.	"Video"	Folds	4:22
6.	"Deal With It"	Folds	0:54
7.	"Untitled" (hidden track)	instrumental	1:37
Total length:			19:59

Side B
No.	Title	Lead vocals	Length
1.	"Get That Bug (Outta Your System)"	Powers	2:52
2.	"Everyone Else"	Olson	3:41
3.	"Kalamazoo"	Powers	3:51
4.	"We Know What's Right"	Olson	3:51
5.	"Cool Whip"	Powers	3:31
Total length:			18:11

=== Cassette version ===
Side A
No.	Title	Writer(s)	Lead vocals	Length
1.	"We Know What's Right"		Olson	4:16
2.	"Clueless"		Powers; Olson	2:30
3.	"Emaline"	Folds, Olson	Powers	3:08
4.	"Guilty"		Folds	4:00
5.	"Cool Whip"		Powers	3:31
6.	"Deal With It"		Folds	0:54
Total length:				18:20

Side B
No.	Title	Lead vocals	Length
1.	"Get That Bug (Outta Your System)"	Powers	2:52
2.	"Everyone Else"	Olson	3:41
3.	"Kalamazoo"	Powers	3:51
4.	"Where's Bohemia"	Powers; Olson	3:26
5.	"Video"	Folds	4:22
Total length:			18:13

- Track A1 is listed as "We Know What's Right For You" on the spine of the cover, as well as the label of the cassette itself.

== Personnel ==
=== The band ===
- Millard Powers – guitar, vocals, producer
- Ben Folds – bass guitar, piano, vocals, drums (various tracks), producer
- Evan Olson – vocals
- Chris Brown – drums (various tracks)
- Dave Rich – drums (various tracks)
