= When I Dream of Michelangelo =

Single by Counting Crows

from the album Saturday Nights & Sunday Mornings
- Released: December 2008
- Genre: Rock
- Length: 3:06
- Label: Geffen
- Songwriters: Adam Duritz, David Bryson, Charlie Gillingham, Dan Vickrey, David Immerglück, Jim Bogios, Millard Powers
- Producer: Brian Deck

Counting Crows singles chronology
"Come Around" (2008)	"When I Dream of Michelangelo" (2008)	"Palisades Park" (2014)

"When I Dream of Michelangelo" is the eighth track on Counting Crows' 2008 album Saturday Nights & Sunday Mornings (the second on the more reflective "Sunday Mornings" half of the record).

Although it was not released as a single, it was featured as the B-side to "1492" on a free downloadable "digital 45" that preceded the release of the album. In December 2008, it would also be serviced to the Adult Alternative (or Triple A) radio format as the third airplay single this era, following up the chart-topping "Come Around". It hit a peak of #7 on the chart on 27 March 2009.

The track shares a lyric from the band's earlier single "Angels of the Silences", from which the song's title originates: "I dream of Michelangelo when I’m lying in my bed".

== Song meaning ==
Duritz acknowledged in a 23 April 2008 interview via Leo's Music Cast that the song is among the first he ever started writing:

"When I Dream of Michelangelo" was a song I began writing 20 years ago. I only had an idea of that image – and a bit of the music. Which is why that line shows up later in "Angels of the Silences" because I still didn’t understand what "When I Dream of Michelangelo" was about; but I had that image. And that was the right image for that line in "Angels of the Silences". But it wasn’t until now that I was able to write the whole song. But that little piece of music and the sliver of lyrics that went along with it have been there for 20 years. I just hadn’t able to get the song out or understand what it was really about.

Duritz explained the song's evolution more elaborately in a March 2008 interview with James Campion:

I had this idea of Michelangelo lying on his back painting the Creation: God reaching out to Adam, and in my mind not being able to quite reach God. Obviously it's the opposite, God has just touched Adam and he is alive. This is what's happening, but in my mind it was always he reaching out and not quite touching God. But I couldn't flesh this out. So the idea crops up in Angels of the Silences, but as I changed, experienced more, and understood what the song was going to be about; it became about the constant struggle of the artist to reach for something divine, to create something out of nothing, which is the original divine act; there was a void and let there be light, making something out of nothing. Anything! Build a chair, make a song, make a jump shot, but always try and reach for something different. But to me I would never, ever be able to reach an understanding, a feeling of satisfaction in it. Finally, what the song is really about for me is that while you're spending your whole life stretching out from something you can't touch, you forget to touch everything else around you, and that I had become so divorced from the world through this disorder that the only thing I ever focused on was the music and it was the only touchstone I had on earth, and I had lost touch with everything else, and that is what that song was about, and now I knew how to write it.
