= Underwater Sunshine (or What We Did on Our Summer Vacation) =

Studio album by Counting Crows
- Released: April 10, 2012
- Recorded: April and June 2011
- Genres: Alternative rock; country rock
- Length: 61:26
- Labels: Cooking Vinyl (UK); Collective Sounds (US)
- Producers: Counting Crows; Shawn Dealey

Counting Crows chronology
August and Everything After: Live at Town Hall (2011)	Underwater Sunshine (or What We Did on Our Summer Vacation) (2012)	Echoes of the Outlaw Roadshow (2013)

Underwater Sunshine (Or What We Did on Our Summer Vacation) is the sixth studio album by American rock band Counting Crows, released on April 10, 2012, on Cooking Vinyl. The album is composed of cover songs, with vocalist Adam Duritz stating, "Sometimes it's great to play someone else's music and try to make it your own. Sometimes it's great just because it's fun."

Produced by both the band and Shawn Dealy, the album includes compositions from the 1960s through to the 2010s, and features songs written by the band's early contemporaries Tender Mercies and Sordid Humor, both of which included members of Counting Crows before the formation of the band.

== Background and recording ==
In March 2009, Counting Crows left Geffen Records, becoming independent recording artists for the first time in eighteen years. The band subsequently decided to record a covers album as their first independent release, with vocalist Adam Duritz noting, "it seemed [like] a good time for it." In April 2011, the band began recording Underwater Sunshine, in Burbank, California, with sound engineer Shawn Dealey co-producing the sessions. Brian Deck, who had previously produced the latter half of the band's previous double album, Saturday Nights & Sunday Mornings (2008), mixed the album. The band collaborated to choose their favorite songs to record.

The band worked on versions of Stereophonics' "Local Boy in the Photograph" and Joe Jackson's "It's Different for Girls" during the recording process; however they were not included in the final track listing. They continued to write original songs while recording the album.

The band commissioned fans to create the album's artwork.

== Critical reception ==
Professional ratings
Aggregate scores
Source	Rating
Metacritic	62/100
Review scores
Source	Rating
Consequence of Sound	3/5 stars
Daily Express	3/5 stars
The Guardian	3/5 stars
Hot Press	Positive
Irish Independent	Negative
Washington Post (by way of Associated Press)	Positive

The album received mixed reviews. Hot Press' Edwin McFee who wrote that its "spirit of adventure infuses the opus with a sense of fun and excitement." Caroline Sullivan of The Guardian gave the album three out of five stars, remarking that it seems a "waste of energy" to release an album of covers, but a few of the tracks were surprisingly fresh. Writing for Daily Express, Simon Gage called the country rock feel of the album "surprisingly lovely", but gave the effort only three out of five stars. An Associated Press review was particularly positive, highlighting the country influence, saying that it "feels like a comfortable pair of jeans."

Another three star review came from Matt Melis of Consequence of Sound who mentioned the country rock stylings on the songs and remarked that the album "doesn't reward listeners with definitive versions or perfect takes. Rather, it's sprinkled with 'keeper' moments and variations (subtle and not so) on originals that feel just right."

A negative review came from Irish Independent's John Meagher, who criticized both the song selection and the performances on the album as bland and no better than the originals.

== Track listing ==
No.	Title	Writer(s)	Original artist	Length
1.	"Untitled (Love Song)"	Luke MacMaster	The Romany Rye	5:07
2.	"Start Again"	Norman Blake	Teenage Fanclub	3:33
3.	"Hospital"	Coby Brown	Coby Brown	3:08
4.	"Mercy"	Kurt Stevenson, Patrick Winningham and Chris Boesel	Tender Mercies	3:31
5.	"Meet on the Ledge"	Richard Thompson	Fairport Convention	3:37
6.	"Like Teenage Gravity"	Kasey Anderson	Kasey Anderson	5:10
7.	"Amie"	Craig Fuller	Pure Prairie League	4:33
8.	"Coming Around"	Fran Healy	Travis	2:59
9.	"Ooh La La"	Ronnie Lane and Ron Wood	Faces	4:37
10.	"All My Failures"	Taylor Goldsmith	Dawes	4:37
11.	"Return of the Grievous Angel"	Gram Parsons and Thomas Stanley Brown	Gram Parsons	4:22
12.	"Four White Stallions"	Patrick Winningham, Jeff Trott, and Dan Vickrey	Tender Mercies	4:00
13.	"Jumping Jesus"	Tom Barnes and Jim Gordon	Sordid Humor	3:04
14.	"You Ain't Goin' Nowhere"	Bob Dylan	Bob Dylan and The Byrds	4:19
15.	"The Ballad of El Goodo"	Alex Chilton and Chris Bell	Big Star	4:49

iTunes Store bonus tracks
No.	Title	Writer(s)	Original artist	Length
16.	"Borderline"	Reggie Lucas	Madonna	4:18
17.	"Girl from the North Country"	Dylan	Bob Dylan	5:52

== Personnel ==
=== Counting Crows ===
- Jim Bogios – drums and percussion; tambourine on "Start Again", "Hospital", "Amie", and "Ooh La La"; backing vocals on "Meet on the Ledge" and "Coming Around"
- Dave Bryson – electric guitar on "Hospital", "Like Teenage Gravity", "All My Failures", and "Jumping Jesus"; acoustic guitar on "Mercy", "Meet on the Ledge", "Amie", "Return of the Grievous Angel", "Four White Stallions", and "You Ain't Goin' Nowhere"; twelve-string electric guitar on "Start Again" and "Coming Around"; mandolin on "Untitled (Love Song)"; and banjo on "The Ballad of El Goodo"
- Adam Duritz – lead vocals, backing vocals on "Start Again", "Meet on the Ledge", and "The Ballad of El Goodo"
- Charlie Gillingham – piano on "Untitled (Love Song)", "Start Again", "Mercy", "Meet on the Ledge", "Like Teenage Gravity", "Ooh La La", "All My Failures", "Return of the Grievous Angel", and "You Ain't Goin' Nowhere"; Hammond B-3 on "Untitled (Love Song)", "Mercy", "Meet on the Ledge", "Like Teenage Gravity", "Coming Around", "All My Failures", and "Four White Stallions"; accordion on "Amie", Mellotron on "Coming Around", Wurlitzer on "Coming Around", backing vocals on "Untitled (Love Song)", "Mercy", "Amie", "All My Failures", and "Jumping Jesus"; string composition on "Hospital", pizzicato strings on "Jumping Jesus", doorbell on "Coming Around"
- David Immergluck – mandolin on "Start Again", "Amie", "Return of the Grievous Angel", and "You Ain't Goin' Nowhere"; acoustic guitar on "Like Teenage Gravity", "Ooh La La", "Jumping Jesus", and "The Ballad of El Goodo"; electric guitar on "Untitled (Love Song)", "Meet on the Ledge", and "All My Failures"; bass guitar on "Hospital"; banjo on "Mercy"; twelve-string electric guitar on "Coming Around"; glockenspiel on "Coming Around", pedal steel on "Four White Stallions", baritone electric guitar on "Jumping Jesus", backing vocals on "Start Again", "Hospital", "Meet on the Ledge", "Amie", "Ooh La La", "You Ain't Goin' Nowhere", and "The Ballad of El Goodo"
- Millard Powers – bass guitar, upright double bass on "Amie", acoustic guitar on "Hospital", backing vocals on "Coming Around"
- Dan Vickrey – electric guitar on "Untitled (Love Song)", "Hospital", "Mercy", "Meet on the Ledge", "Like Teenage Gravity", "Return of the Grievous Angel", "Four White Stallions", "Jumping Jesus", and "You Ain't Goin' Nowhere"; acoustic guitar on "Start Again", "Amie", "Ooh La Lah", and "All My Failures"; banjo on "Coming Around"; acoustic twelve-string guitar on "The Ballad of El Goodo"; backing vocals on "Untitled (Love Song)", "Start Again", "Mercy", "All My Failures", "Return of the Grievous Angel", "Four White Stallions", "Jumping Jesus", "You Ain't Goin' Nowhere", and "The Ballad of El Goodo"

=== Additional musicians ===
- Leanne Zacharias – cello on "Hospital"

=== Recording personnel ===
- Dave Bryson – additional engineering, mixing on "Coming Around"
- Counting Crows – production
- Shawn Dealey – production, recording engineering
- Brian Deck – mixing
- Richard Dodd – mastering
- Brian Dong – recording assistant
- Robert Hawes – recording assistant
- Josh Rhinehart – package design
- Ivan Sciberras – cover concept, cover design
- Jorge Velasco – recording assistant

== Charts ==
Chart performance for Underwater Sunshine (or What We Did on Our Summer Vacation)
Chart (2012)	Peak position
Belgian Albums (Ultratop Flanders)	40
Dutch Albums (Album Top 100)	11
Irish Albums (IRMA)	46
Italian Albums (FIMI)	93
Scottish Albums (Official Charts)	15
Swiss Albums (Schweizer Hitparade)	77
UK Albums (Official Charts)	23
US Billboard 200	11
US Independent Albums (Billboard)	4
US Top Alternative Albums (Billboard)	3
US Top Rock Albums (Billboard)	4
