= Sordid Humor =

US rock band

- Origin: San Francisco, California, U.S.
- Genres: Rock, indie, alternative, College rock
- Years active: 1987–1991
- Labels: Oedipus Records, Capricorn Records
- Past members: Tom Barnes; Jim Gordon; Adam Duritz; Toby Hawkins; Jim Gordon; Ken Gregg; David Immergluck; Marty Jones; Chris Pedersen; Tony Fader

Sordid Humor was an American rock music band, formed in San Francisco, California in 1987 by singer and guitarist Tom Barnes and bassist Jim Gordon, who met while working at a pizzeria in Oakland.

== History ==
=== Early years ===
Formed amid San Francisco’s vibrant late 1980s post punk club scene, then thriving with small venues showcasing emerging alternative acts, Sordid Humor played early gigs at the Kennel Club, I-Beam, Paradise Lounge, and DNA Lounge, sharing stages with bands such as Primus, Napalm Beach, and Swamp Zombies. The group featured a rotating lineup of drummers and was known for its dark, melodic sound and introspective lyrics exploring themes of human fragility and emotional complexity.

=== EP Release ===
The band released their self-recorded debut EP, Tony Dont, on vinyl in 1989 through their own label, Oedipus Records. The record was well received on college radio, earning airplay on more than 100 college and modern rock stations across the United States. CMJ New Music Report praised the EP at the time, noting that "Sordid Humor has a well-developed, savvy knack for pulling just the right melodic strings, cutting pure, sprightly pop with enough grams of eccentricity to keep the brain moving right along with the toes." It also called the songs "Apollo XII" and "First Goodbye" "radio winners and fine indications of more aural splendor from Sordid Humor further down the line."

=== Breakup and Posthumous Release ===
Despite the positive response to their self-released EP and a strong following in the San Francisco club scene, Sordid Humor did not sign with either an independent or major record label. "We would’ve liked someone to put an album out. People seemed to like us, but we never had an opportunity,” Barnes told The San Francisco Examiner in 1994. “Maybe the issues we dealt with were too intense. The songs are often about a sole personality trying to find an anchor or some kind of serenity. By ‘91, I was so bitter. I thought, Why beat a dead horse?’ So we disbanded.”

Sordid Humor’s only full-length album, Light Music for Dying People, was released posthumously in 1994 by Capricorn Records. The album was compiled from three years of demo recordings.

Although Sordid Humor had been inactive for three years, their unreleased recordings attracted renewed attention following the rise of Counting Crows, whose frontman Adam Duritz had sung backing vocals on much of the band’s material. The connection highlighted the creative overlap between the two groups: Duritz contributed to several tracks on Light Music for Dying People—including “Barbarossa,” which he also co-wrote—while David Immerglück played bass and David Bryson produced much of the album at his Dancing Dog Studios in Emeryville. Counting Crows often performed Sordid Humor’s “Jumping Jesus” in concert and later recorded it for their album ‘’Underwater Sunshine’’, and Duritz occasionally incorporated lyrics from other Sordid Humor songs into live Counting Crows performances.

=== Post Sordid Humor ===
After Sordid Humor, Tom Barnes went on to form the band Engine 88, while Gordon left the music industry.

== Albums ==
| Title | Album details |
|---|---|
| Light Music for Dying People | Released: 1994; Label: Capricorn Records; Formats: CD |

== Singles and EPs ==
| Title | Single details |
|---|---|
| Tony Don't | Released: 1989; Label: Oedipus Records; Formats: 12-inch EP |
| Barbarossa | Released: 1994; Label: Capricorn Records; Formats: CD, Promo Single |
