= Chuck Folds =

Chuck Folds is a musician living in North Carolina. He is the younger brother of the piano playing pop/rock star Ben Folds. Chuck has played bass in a number of bands since the late 1980s, including Bus Stop with Evan Olson, Britt "Snuzz" Uzzell, and Eddie Walker. Bus Stop independently released 4 CDs and played the south-eastern U.S. for about 7 years, becoming one of the more popular bands in North Carolina during the early 1990s.

After Bus Stop disbanded, Chuck joined Eddie Walker to back up Britt Uzzells in a band called Snuzz. Uzzell later played guitar with Ben Folds on the Rockin' the Suburbs tour, and played in International Orange with Ben's former bass player Robert Sledge (incidentally, Chuck and Robert were friends and that is how Robert got the gig in Ben Folds Five). During the same time period he started his own cover band called Rubberband which primarily plays for private events and has become a popular U.S. east coast party band .

Chuck's most recent project is called Chuck Folds Five, which is a comic reference to his older brother's former band. Chuck Folds Five is a three-piece band and also includes Steve Williard on guitar and Tim Poole on the drums. They are primarily a cover band but also record and perform their own original songs which can be found on Chuck's website.

Currently, Chuck is a Ph.D. student at The University of North Carolina at Greensboro in their Geography program and is also a professor there.
