= Palisades Park (Counting Crows song) =

2014 single by Counting Crows

Single by Counting Crows

from the album Somewhere Under Wonderland
- Released: July 8, 2014
- Recorded: 2013–2014
- Genre: Alternative rock
- Length: 8:22
- Label: Capitol
- Songwriter: Adam Duritz
- Producer: Brian Deck

Counting Crows singles chronology
"When I Dream of Michelangelo" (2008)	"Palisades Park" (2014)	"Scarecrow" (2014)

"Palisades Park" is a 2014 song released by Counting Crows on Capitol Records as the lead single from the album Somewhere Under Wonderland.

Adam Duritz has said that the song is "about the best thing I've written in my life. It's an epic story of two kids from New York in the late '70s and their lives in Basin Park. It's about taking a look at your life and trying to figure out how you got here when you were there. It's also about Reno in 1910 and the story of Jack Johnson knocking out Jim Jeffries, who ends up lying on the ground looking at the sky thinking he’s not sure how this happened, how am I here? I was there. It starts as a story about that, then changes to be about these kids and their lives and how they changed. It's the best thing I've ever written, very heartfelt." Duritz expanded on a 2014 episode of Acoustic Café: "I started writing this song and initially it was about a guy and a girl growing up in the '60s and '70s. I started to write about their lives, but then when we got to... the verse after the first chorus. 'You walk into the bar like some Saturday star stud straight on spiked heels and needles and nerves.' I really started to get this idea about them cross-dressing. Well at least the guy dressing up in woman's clothes. So the song's very informed about that, about people living on the fringes and trying things just cause it's interesting to try things in life. I mean cause they're interested in what's over the next hill. What does it feel like to dress up in woman's clothes when you’re a guy? You know, it's nothing to do with being gay or not being gay. It's just what does it feel like to be different?"

== Music video ==
The song was promoted by a short film directed by Bill Fishman, filmed in New York City in 2014.
