= Owsley (album) =

Studio album by Owsley
- Released: March 23, 1999
- Recorded: October 1995–December 1998
- Studios: The Outhouse and The White House (Nashville, Tennessee); Sound Kitchen (Franklin, Tennessee); Encore Studios (Burbank, California).
- Genres: Rock, power pop
- Length: 42:23
- Label: Giant
- Producers: Owsley, Millard Powers, Jeff Balding, Chris McHugh (executive)

Owsley chronology
Owsley (1999)	The Hard Way (2004)

Professional ratings
Review scores
Source	Rating
AllMusic	4/5 stars

Owsley is the debut album by American singer-songwriter Owsley, released on Giant Records in 1999. The album was nominated for a Grammy Award for Best Engineered Album.

Critics have noted musical influences from 1970s pop rock, including The Beatles, Todd Rundgren, and The Cars.

Owsley recorded the album in his own home studio, funded largely by his work as guitarist in Amy Grant's touring band.

== Track listing ==
Owsley
No.	Title	Length
1.	"Oh No the Radio" (William Reese Owsley III, Millard Powers, Ross Rice)	5:00
2.	"I'm Alright" (Owsley, Trevor Morgan)	3:06
3.	"Coming Up Roses" (Owsley, Powers)	4:03
4.	"Good Old Days" (Owsley)	3:28
5.	"The Sky Is Falling" (Owsley, Powers, Jody Spence)	3:47
6.	"Sentimental Favorite" (Owsley, Morgan)	3:29
7.	"Zavelow House" (Owsley, Morgan)	3:42
8.	"Sonny Boy" (Owsley)	4:23
9.	"The Homecoming Song" (Owsley)	3:00
10.	"Uncle John's Farm" (Owsley)	2:37
11.	"Class Clown" (Owsley)	5:48
Total length:		42:23

== Personnel ==
- Will Owsley – vocals (except 5-instrumental-out), all guitars, bass (2, 3, 5, 9–11), Echoplex (2), Mellotron (3, 11), Wurlitzer electric piano (3), Hammond B3 organ (3), Chamberlin (3), acoustic piano (8, 10)
- Jonathan Hamby – Hammond B3 organ (1, 4, 5), Minimoog (2), Wurlitzer electric piano (5, 6), Chamberlin (6)
- Phil Madeira – Hammond B3 organ (9)
- Millard Powers – bass (1, 3, 5-instrumental-out, 6), backing vocals (3), Minimoog solo (7)
- Spencer Campbell – bass (4, 8), string parts (6)
- Bob Parr – bass (7)
- Chris McHugh – drums, percussion (4, 5, 7, 9)
- John Catchings – cello (3)
- John Mark Painter – string parts (3)
- Rebecca Walker – backing vocals (7, 11)

== Production ==
- Chris McHugh – executive producer
- Will Owsley – producer, engineer (4, 8), mix assistant (9)
- Millard Powers – producer (1, 3, 6), engineer (1, 3, 6, 7), mixing (9)
- Jeff Balding – producer (9, 10, 11), engineer (10, 11)
- J.R. McNeely – engineer (2, 5), mixing (5-instrumental-out, 6, 8, 10, 11)
- Shane Wilson – engineer (3), recording (5-instrumental-out)
- J.C. Monterrosa – assistant engineer (2, 5)
- Todd Gunnerson – assistant engineer (6, 8, 10, 11)
- Tom Lord-Alge – mixing (1–5, 7)
- Mauricio Iragorri – mix assistant (1–5, 7)
- Fred Paragano – digital editing
- Bob Ludwig – mastering at Gateway Mastering (Portland, Maine)
- Karen Lichtman – album coordination
- Stephen Walker – art direction
- Airedale Brothers – photography
- Sean Dungan – photography
- John Clark – photography
