= Sshh Liguz =

- Also known as: SSHH
- Born: Sharna Liguz; 10 September 1984 (age 41); Bondi, New South Wales, Australia
- Origin: London, England
- Genres: Rock, hard rock, alt rock, and punk rock
- Instrument: Vocals
- Spouse: Zak Starkey (m. 2022)

Sharna Liguz, also known as Sshh Liguz, (born 10 September 1984) is an Australian-English artist and singer currently living in London, UK. She is a part of the music duo Sshh with her husband Zak Starkey.

== Early life ==
Sshh Liguz was born on 10 September 1984 in Bondi, New South Wales, Australia, where she grew up with an interest in entertainment and the arts. As a teenager, she wrote reviews and hosted a radio show before attending Bradfield College of the Arts and eventually the National Art School. In school, Liguz began playing with various bands in Australia, and became more interested in performing than attending art classes with their strict structure. Liguz dropped out of art school and moved to England looking for her next path. Liguz eventually met musician Zak Starkey at a show, and they began making music together. They began collaborating when Starkey was touring as the drummer for Oasis. Starkey sent Sshh a guitar riff which she added on to, leading to their first song recorded over the phone. They started releasing material in 2006 under the name Pengu!ns, with Starkey on drums, Sshh on vocals, Shane Devany on guitar, and Tatia Starkey on bass. The project name comes from the lyric ‘Penguins start your engines’ from their song ‘Jet Engines.’ The group began playing live together in 2008, and in 2011, the touring Pengu!ns lineup consisted solely of Sshh and Starkey as a duo. They now both reside in London, UK. On March 21, 2022, she married her music partner Zak Starkey.

== Sshh ==
The duo continued making music together in London with Zak Starkey on guitar and Liguz on vocals under the name Sshh. They were asked to do a SiriusXM series discussing their musical influences. Instead of simply discussing individual songs, the duo decided to take a different approach to the series by inviting original members of the rhythm sections of the influential bands to play with them and record. The effort resulted in Issues, the duo's debut album of cover songs which benefits the Teen Cancer Program.

The duo have not set a release date for the album, but have released the track list with the names of collaborating artists:

1. "Problems" with Paul Cook and Glen Matlock of Sex Pistols
2. "Jah War" with Dave Ruffy and Segs of The Ruts
3. "Shoot Speed Kill Light/Rocks" with Darren Moonie and Simone Butler of Primal Scream
4. "All The Young Dudes" with Mick Ralphs of Mott the Hoople and Martin Chambers and Glen Matlock
5. "Dominos" with Robbie Furze of The Big Pink, and Twiggy and Gil Sharone from Marilyn Manson
6. "One Way Or Another" with Clem Burke of Blondie
7. "Back To Black" with Dale Davis and Nathan Allen of Amy Winehouse's band
8. "Private Life" with Martin Chambers of The Pretenders and Glen Matlock
9. "Get Up Stand Up" with Santa Davis and Fully Fullwood of Peter Tosh Word Sound & Power and Eddie Vedder
10. "Babylon's Burning" with Dave Ruffy and Segs of The Ruts
11. "Tin Soldier" with Kenney Jones of the Small Faces
