= Ram On (song) =

Song by Paul McCartney

from the album Ram
- Released: 17 May 1971
- Recorded: 22 February—18 June 1971
- Genre: Lo-fi rock
- Length: 2:24; 0:52 (reprise)
- Label: Apple
- Songwriter: P. McCartney
- Producers: P. McCartney and Linda McCartney

"Ram On" is a song written by recorded by Paul McCartney and included on his 1971 collaborative album Ram (1971) with his then wife Linda McCartney. Although included on the album, it is credited to Paul McCartney.

== Background ==
Paul wrote the song on its primary instrument, the ukulele, as he would carry ukuleles with him when he would take cab rides in New York, although the cabbies would call him crazy.

== Music and lyrics ==
The song's music consists of Paul playing a ukulele and singing while drums, percussion, piano, and a Wurlitzer electric piano plays near the end (the piano and Wurlitzer also appear in the beginning). His wife Linda also sings backing vocals. Ram engineer Eirik Wangberg stated that "I was supposed to stop the mix before this song starts – but I found the transition going down so cool I wanted it before the fade!" as the song was supposed to segue into "Big Barn Bed", which would later appear on Red Rose Speedway. He also recalled the song being originally longer than 2 minutes. Its lyrics ask the listener to "give your heart to somebody soon, right away". the song's title is a reference to an old stage name "Paul Ramon".

=== Reprise ===
"Ram On" has an under one minute reprise on side two of the album. Jason Greene believed that it "function[s] like a calming breeze" in a Pitchfork review.

== Release and reception ==
In a review of the deluxe edition of Ram, Jayson Greene wrote in a Pitchfork review that it "could serve as the album's redeeming spirit: A haunting, indelible little tune [that] drifts past on ukulele as Paul croons", noting that it acts as a sort of mirror image to John Lennon's song "Hold On" from his debut solo album. Nathan Kamal called it simply a "dreamy ukulele melody". The song is included on the orchestral album Thrillington, which featured Vic Flick on guitar, Clem Cattini on drums, Jim Lawless on percussion, Herbie Flowers on bass and the Mike Sammes Singers on vocals, it is unknown who plays the orchestral instruments.

== Credits and personnel ==
According to the Paul McCartney Project:

Performers

- Paul McCartney – lead and backing vocals, drums and percussion, piano, producer, ukulele, Wurlitzer electric piano
- Linda McCartney – backing vocals, producer

Technical

- Eirik Wangberg – mixing engineer
- Phil Ramone – recording engineer
- Jim Guercio – recording engineer
- Dixon Van Winkle – assistant recording engineer
- Armin Steiner – recording engineer

== Cover version ==
American alternative rock band They Might Be Giants covered the song for the tribute album Listen to What the Man Said: Popular Artists Pay Tribute to the Music of Paul McCartney.
