= The Hard Way (Owsley album) =

Studio album by Owsley
- Released: February 24, 2004
- Recorded: 2001–2003; Circa (studio); The Outhouse (Nashville, Tennessee); The Sound Kitchen (Franklin, Tennessee); The Bennett House (Franklin, Tennessee); Emerald Tracking Room (Nashville, Tennessee)
- Genres: Rock, power pop
- Length: 47:34
- Label: Lakeview
- Producers: Owsley, Keith Thomas, Scot McCracken (executive)

Owsley chronology
Owsley (1999)	The Hard Way (2004)

Professional ratings
Review scores
Source	Rating
AllMusic -	4/5 stars

The Hard Way is the second and final studio album released by American rock musician Owsley.

It was released in 2004 on the independent Lakeview label, five years after his debut album. Some of the delay was attributed to legal difficulties with his former label, Giant Records.

Critics have described the album as having a "heavier" and "more mature" sound compared to his debut album, and note musical influences of Big Star, Todd Rundgren, Tom Petty and Paul McCartney and Wings. Critic Susanne Ault of Billboard wrote, "The music straddles indie and pop sensibilities without ever stepping one foot clearly onto one side or the other. While The Hard Way rolls along competently, the midtempo guitar hooks and straightahead vocals lack the necessary punch to reach mainstream consciousness."

The album was recorded over the span of three years, at different studios in Tennessee, as well as at his home recording studio in Anniston, Alabama. As recording formats and equipment, Owsley used a Studer 16-track 2" at 15 ips, an MCI 16-track 2" at 30 ips, the Otari Radar II multitrack hard disk recorder, and Pro Tools.

The lead single is "Be with You".

== Track listing ==
The Hard Way
No.	Title	Length
1.	"Be with You" (William Reese Owsley III, Dill O'Brien, Keith Thomas)	4:37
2.	"Rise" (Owsley, O'Brien)	5:22
3.	"She's the One" (Owsley, Trevor Morgan)	3:55
4.	"Dude" (Owsley, Gordon Kennedy)	3:41
5.	"Down" (Owsley)	3:25
6.	"Matriarch" (Owsley)	3:56
7.	"Undone" (Owsley, Kennedy)	3:26
8.	"The Hard Way" (Owsley, James Michael, Simon Petty)	4:07
9.	"Dirty Bird" (Owsley)	3:46
10.	"Rainy Day People" (Owsley, Morgan)	5:31
11.	"Band on the Run" (hidden at 6:00 of Rainy Day People; Paul McCartney, Linda McCartney)	5:13
Total length:		47:34

== Personnel ==
- Will Owsley – lead vocals, backing vocals, electric guitars, acoustic guitar (3, 8), bass (5, 6, 8), acoustic piano (6, 7)
- Jonathan Hamby – Hammond B3 organ, acoustic piano (4), Chamberlin (5), synthesizers (9)
- Keith Thomas – strings (1, 6)
- John Mark Painter – Chamberlin (2)
- Tom Bukovac – electric guitar (1), acoustic guitar (1), bass (2)
- Gordon Kennedy – electric guitar (7), backing vocals (7)
- Jimmie Lee Sloas – bass (1, 7)
- Michael Rhodes – bass (3, 9, 10)
- Millard Powers – bass (4)
- Chris McHugh – drums, percussion
- Simon Petty – harmonica (8)
- Rebecca Walker – backing vocals (10)

== Production ==
- Scot McCracken – executive producer, creative director
- Will Owsley – producer, engineer
- Keith Thomas – producer (1), photography
- James Michael – vocal producer (8)
- Paul David Hager – engineer, mixing
- Mark Ralston – mix assistant
- Jeff Balding – engineer
- J.R. McNeely – engineer
- Dan Shike – engineer
- F. Reid Shippen – engineer
- Billy Whittington – engineer
- Shane D. Wilson – engineer
- George Marino – mastering at Sterling Sound (New York City, New York)
- Jill Simonsen – package design
- Lisa Robinson – wardrobe stylist
