= The Romany Rye (band) =

- Origin: Long Beach, CA, US
- Genres: Folk-rock, indie, Americana
- Years active: 2009–present

The Romany Rye is a band formed by Luke MacMaster, former guitarist of The Colour. Their first album, Highway 1, Looking Back Carefully, was released on October 5, 2009 with a track listing of eight songs. The band could be categorized as indie folk-rock and draws comparisons to the likes of Neil Young, My Morning Jacket, Ryan Adams & The Cardinals, and many others. Kings of Leon guitarist Matthew Followill, whose band has its early roots in country rock, dubbed them a band to watch in 2010. On January 3, 2012, they released their second album, "Quicksilver Sunbeam".

The band's song "Untitled (Love Song)" was covered by Counting Crows on their 2012 album Underwater Sunshine.

== Highway 1, Looking Back Carefully ==
Track	Track title	Length
1	Brother	4:36
2	Dear Holly	3:44
3	Old Soul	4:16
4	All the Boys	4:18
5	Black Hair	2:43
6	Long Way Down	3:53
7	Marquee	2:42
8	Untitled (Love Song)	5:22

== Quicksilver Sunbeam ==
On January 3, 2012, The Romany Rye released "Quicksilver Sunbeam." The album contained 12 tracks including "Brother" and "Untitled (Love Song)" from their previous release. Some albums were released with a bonus 13th track, "Yesterday's Boy".

Track	Track title	Length
1	My True North	4:00
2	You Only For My Sorrow	3:13
3	New King Of The Mountain	4:42
4	Sunday Smoke (Jesus Christ)	3:58
5	Untitled (Love Song)	5:24
6	Hold The Ones You Love	4:15
7	Brother	4:37
8	My Old Home	3:40
9	Country Girls	3:36
10	Quicksilver Sunbeam	3:18
11	On The Road	5:05
12	I Hate Myself	4:32
13	Yesterday's Boy (Bonus Track)	3:46

== Rolling Stone Cover Contest ==
In early February 2011, when Rolling Stone magazine created a contest called "Do You Wanna Be A Rock & Roll Star?", The Romany Rye was one of the 16 selected bands. The contest pits these 16 up-and-coming bands against each other in a tournament where fans vote on the bands in order to progress them to the next round. The winner will be featured on the cover of Rolling Stone magazine. On March 16, it was announced that the band made it through into the second round, with 8 bands left. However, it was later reported that the band was disqualified due to a non disclosure agreement violation after Round Two. The Sheepdogs went on to win the competition and be the first ever unsigned band to appear on the cover of Rolling Stone.
