= South Superhighway =

South Superhighway may refer to:

- Osmeña Highway, a toll-free highway from Manila to Magallanes Interchange
- South Luzon Expressway, the tolled portion of South Superhighway from Magallanes Interchange to Matnog, Sorsogon
