= 1492 (song) =

Single by Counting Crows

from the album Saturday Nights & Sunday Mornings
- B-side: "When I Dream of Michelangelo"
- Released: January 12, 2008
- Recorded: 2007–2008
- Genre: Rock
- Label: Geffen
- Songwriter: Adam Duritz

Counting Crows singles chronology
"Holiday in Spain" (2004)	"1492" (2008)	"You Can't Count On Me" (2008)

"1492" is the first song on Counting Crows' 2008 album Saturday Nights & Sunday Mornings. Adam Duritz announced in a voicemail message to his fans on January 12, 2008, that this song would be released as part of a digital 45 release to precede the release of Saturday Nights & Sunday Mornings, with "When I Dream of Michelangelo" to be featured as its B-side. It is, however, not the lead commercial single, as "You Can't Count On Me" was released as the lead airplay/video single on February 4, 2008.

Duritz said that "We just came from New Orleans, we spent about four days in New Orleans. Which at times has been like a home away from home for me, but a rather exhausting one. I expect to have a hangover for the next week. A truly debauched place. If you ever get a chance to go to Italy, and you end up in some dark underground club in Milan with the disco lights flashing all around you, and people writhing on the floor, liquor flying everywhere, and smoke so thick it hurts your eyes, then you’ll understand this song, which is about finding what's real for yourself, whether that's in friends you may or may not have, or laying drunk face down on the floor of some club in Milan, or walking in the middle of the street past train stations and transvestite prostitutes parading in front of you. So this is a song about American history and Italian discovery, and tranny whores. And in the wake of the last four days, it seems like a perfectly good subject, and it's called '1492'."

The song was originally slated for inclusion on the album Hard Candy, but was not included due to Duritz's dissatisfaction with the quality of the recordings made at that time and the inclusion of a six-minute sitar solo.

The digital single was made available for download on their official website on January 16, 2008.

== Track listing ==
1. "1492" – 3:50
2. "When I Dream of Michelangelo" – 3:10
