= Zak Starkey =

English drummer (born 1965)

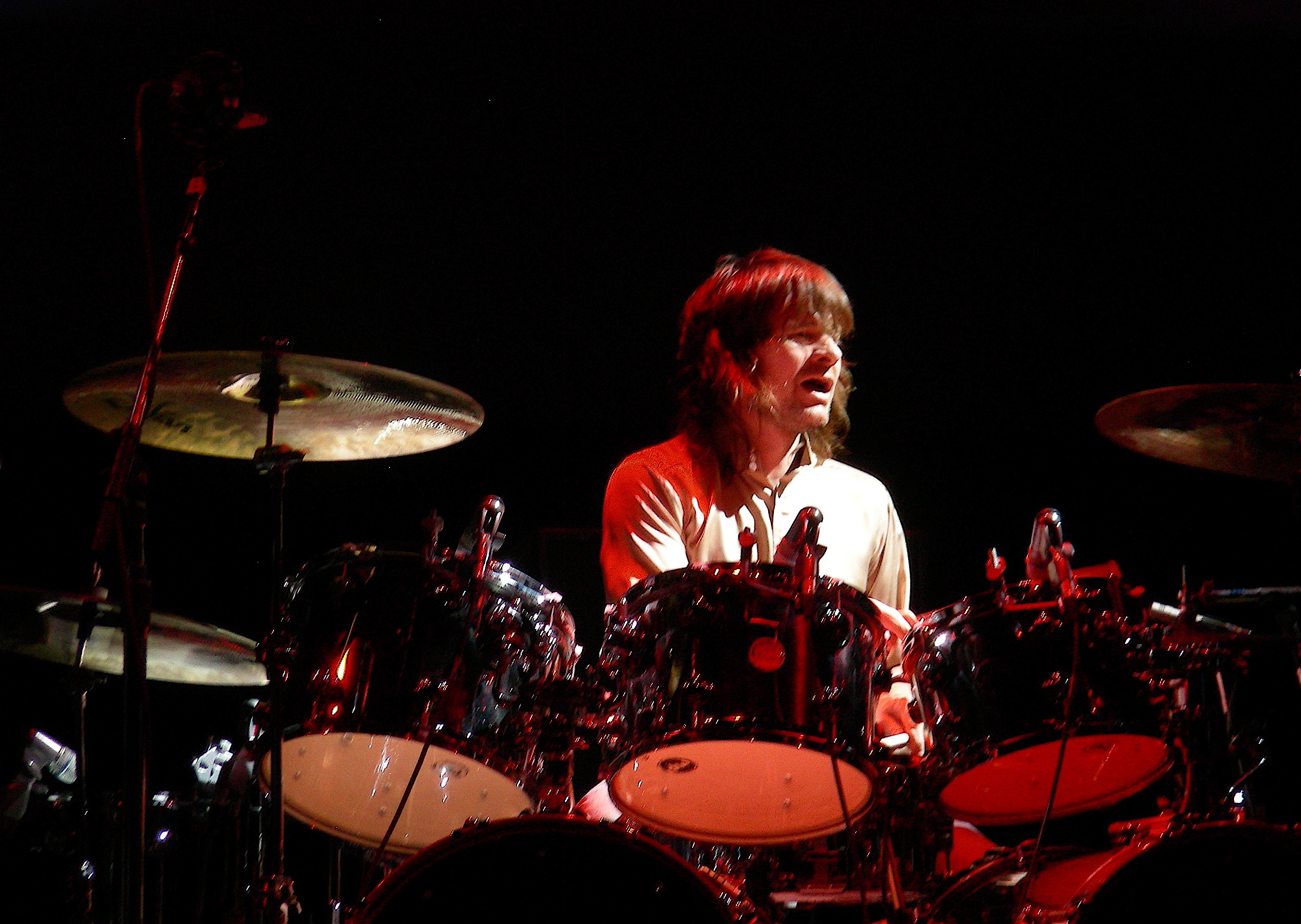
- Starkey performing with the Who in 2008

Background information
- Born: Zak Richard Starkey; 13 September 1965 (age 61); Hammersmith, London, England
- Genres: Hard rock; alternative rock; Britpop; post-punk; pop rock; art rock
- Occupations: Musician
- Instruments: Drums; percussion
- Years active: 1983–present
- Labels: Republic; Main Entry; RCA; Big Brother; SPV; Polydor; Geffen
- Member of: The Empty Hearts
- Formerly of: The Who; Oasis; The Icicle Works; the Lightning Seeds; Ringo Starr & His All-Starr Band; Johnny Marr and the Healers; the Semantics; Casbah Club
- Spouses: Sarah Menikides (m. 1985; div. 2021) Sharna Liguz (m. 2022)

Zak Richard Starkey (born 13 September 1965) is an English drummer, musician and percussionist who toured and recorded with the Who from 1996 to 2025. Other musicians and bands he has worked with include Oasis, Johnny Marr, the Icicle Works, the Lightning Seeds, and the Semantics. He is the son of the Beatles' drummer Ringo Starr and Maureen Starkey.

== Early life ==
Zak Richard Starkey was born on 13 September 1965, at Queen Charlotte's and Chelsea Hospital in Hammersmith, London, to the Beatles' drummer Ringo Starr (Richard Starkey) and Maureen Starkey, Starr's first wife. He grew up at Sunny Heights at St George's Hill in Surrey and Tittenhurst Park at Sunninghill, Berkshire, and attended Highgate School in London until 1981.

At the age of eight, Starkey was given a drum kit by the Who's drummer, Keith Moon. Moon (known to young Zak as "Uncle Keith") was one of his father's closest friends and Starkey's godfather. Although they never sat together at a drum kit, Moon discussed drumming with him as a boy. The drum kit was later sold at Sotheby's for £12,000.

Starkey subsequently began teaching himself to play the drums. His father gave him only one lesson, but he discouraged his growing interest because of the desire not to see him in the same business. Although Starr has praised his son's abilities, he had always regarded him as a future lawyer or doctor. Starr's close friend, Kenney Jones, drummer for Faces and Moon's replacement in the Who, stated that he "virtually taught" the young Starkey to play the drums. By the age of twelve, Starkey was performing in pubs as a member of the garage band the Next. After Moon's death, Jones gifted the teenage Starkey a white drum kit formerly owned by Moon, which had been kept in storage by the Who.

== Career ==
=== Spencer Davis, Eddie Hardin, John Entwistle and the Icicle Works ===
In the early 1980s, Starkey appeared with a re-formed Spencer Davis Group. He briefly joined the Semantics, replacing founding drummer Jody Spence, during the recording process for their album Powerbill, which ended up being released only in Japan in 1996 (after the group had disbanded). He joined the band when they moved from Nashville to Los Angeles and played in some shows and some recording sessions, but the band broke up less than a year after he joined.

In 1985, Starkey played on John Entwistle's solo album The Rock (released in 1996). Starkey replaced Chris Sharrock as the drummer in the Icicle Works in 1988, leaving the band after a brief tenure and appearing on only one recording. Founder member Ian McNabb issued a B-side after Starkey's departure from the band. The song features Starkey on drums and, as it includes band personnel from the time, is presumed to date from his tenure with the group. Starkey also plays on the 1989 album Silver and Gold, a solo work released by Iron Maiden guitarist Adrian Smith.

=== Ringo Starr and the All-Starr Band ===
In 1985, Starkey joined his father on Sun City by Artists United Against Apartheid, and during 1992 and 1995, he toured with Ringo Starr and His All-Starr Band, having previously guested on the band's 1989 tour. Starkey performed at Ringo Starr's 70th birthday party on 7 July 2010 at Radio City Music Hall in New York City. He joined his father and guest stars Yoko Ono, Nils Lofgren, Steven Van Zandt and Jeff Lynne for "With a Little Help from My Friends" and "Give Peace a Chance".

=== The Who: 1996–2025 ===
In 1994, he joined John Entwistle and Roger Daltrey of the Who on a tour entitled "Daltrey Sings Townshend", which had developed from a two-night performance at Carnegie Hall to celebrate Daltrey's fiftieth birthday. In late 1995, he joined the band Face. In the spring of 1996, he left the band to work with the Who on their Quadrophenia tour. He received good reviews in this role and was praised by the music press for his strong drumming presence, without trying to emulate the band's original drummer Keith Moon. Both Townshend and Daltrey stated that Starkey was the best match for the band since the death of Keith Moon.

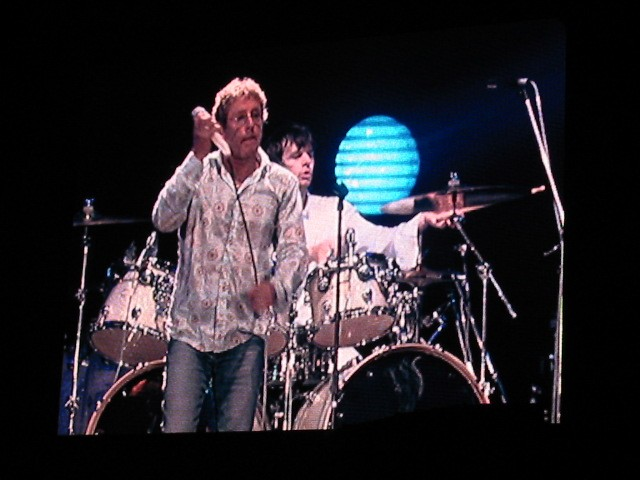
Starkey with Roger Daltrey of the Who in concert

On 20 October 2001, he performed with the Who at the Concert for New York City at Madison Square Garden. This was heralded as the Who's "comeback" performance and they stole the show. Rolling Stone called their performance "one of the 50 moments that changed rock and roll". It was also one of John Entwistle's final appearances with the band. On 7 February 2010, Starkey appeared with the Who during the half-time show of Super Bowl XLIV at the Sun Life Stadium, Miami, Florida.

Starkey was not available to record for most of the Who's 2006 album Endless Wire, as he had been on the road with Oasis and only had time to play on one track. However, he did join the Who for The Who Tour 2006-2007 in support of the album, during which they headlined at Glastonbury Festival in 2007. The tour finished at the Hartwall Areena in Helsinki, Finland on 9 July 2007. Pete Townshend's official website stated that Starkey was afterwards invited to become a full member of the Who, stating: "Some of you may have noticed in one of my recent diary postings that I welcomed Zak into the Who as a permanent member. This is something he doesn't feel he needs or wants. Let's just say that the door is always open to this amazing musician and whenever we can, we will always try to make it possible for Zak to work with the Who in the future." On 12 July 2008, Starkey played the drums for the Who at the 3rd annual VH1 Rock Honors, which celebrated the band's long career.

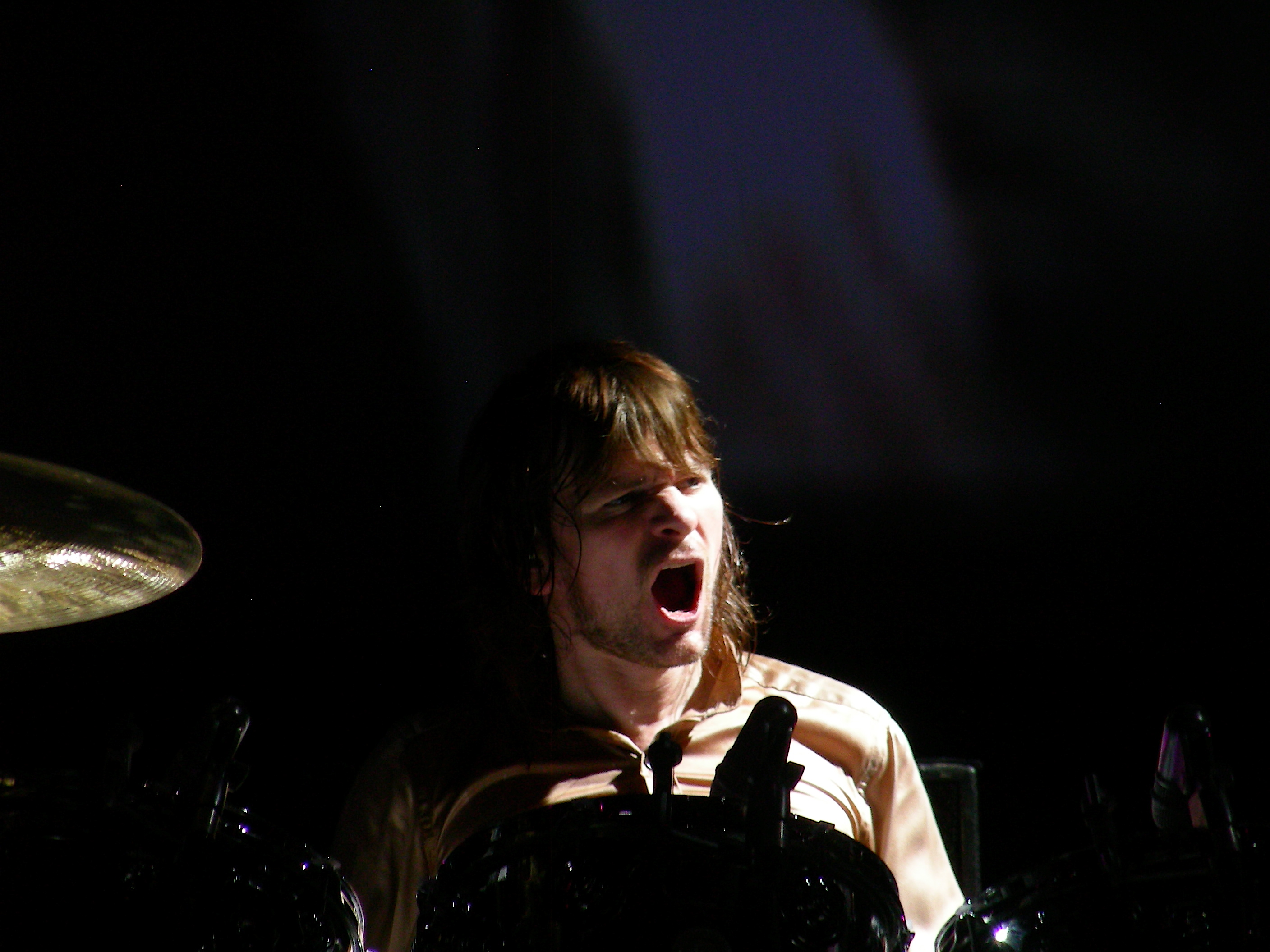
Starkey on stage with the Who in 2008

On 30 March 2010, he played with the band during their performance of Quadrophenia at the Royal Albert Hall in aid of the Teenage Cancer Trust. On 12 August 2012, he played with the Who at the finale of the 2012 Summer Olympics closing ceremony and later that year, on 12 December, he joined them at 12-12-12: The Concert for Sandy Relief. Starkey also joined the Who on their 2012–13 Quadrophenia and More tour, but he had to back out in February 2013 when he developed tendonitis but he re-joined the Who in September 2014 for their Who Hits 50 tour of UK and Europe and North America. in July 2015 and other shows during this year as part of The Who Hits 50! tour, which had started in 2014. This tour went on to include the Who at Desert Trip concert at Coachella Festival in California on 28 June 2015. Starkey also appeared with the Who when they performed as the headline act at the Glastonbury Festival. During this time, Starkey also played shows with Mick Jones of the Clash and formed the Silver Machine with Bobby Gillespie, Andrew Innes, Glen Matlock and Little Barrie.

In September 2016, Starkey was interviewed by Rolling Stone about the new covers album he was working on with Sharna Liguz, compiled with songs that had influenced them. They recorded these with the original members from each of the relevant bands. Funding for the album's ten tracks was raised by a crowdfunding campaign through the Pledgemusic site. Under the name SSHH, Starkey and Liguz also recorded other tracks.

On 15 April 2025, it was reported that Townshend and Daltrey had sacked Starkey as their drummer, due to a disagreement or miscommunication between Daltrey and Starkey. During a charity concert on 30 March at the Royal Albert Hall, Roger Daltrey stopped the show a few times, with Pete Townshend carrying on when he could not, due to a problem with sound levels. Daltrey ended the concert at the last song, saying "To sing that song I do need to hear the key, and I can’t. All I’ve got is drums going boom, boom, boom. I can’t sing to that". Daltrey later explained that the problem was caused by the sound person feeding a bad mix into his in-ear monitor, but Starkey took this as criticism of his playing, sniped back, and there were hurt feelings all round.

Starkey stated: "I was surprised and saddened anyone would have an issue with my performance that night" but added: "I remain their biggest fan" and "wish them the best." On 19 April, the band publicly announced that Starkey would be remaining with the band after all, with Townshend stating that all communication issues between Starkey and the band had been "aired happily". However, a month later on May 18, Townshend announced on Instagram that Starkey would be leaving to pursue other projects. Starkey refuted this statement on Instagram, saying he had been fired two weeks after reinstatement and had been asked by the band to state that he had quit. The band then released a formal announcement reiterating their impending retirement and that Starkey "needs to devote all his energy" towards his other projects. He later claimed that he had been "retired rather than fired". Starkey was still set to perform songs by The Who at an upcoming solo concert in February 2026. In August 2026, Daltrey revealed to the audience at a solo show in Las Vegas that The Who had recently rehearsed with Starkey for a possible European leg of the farewell tour, with Starkey later confirming Daltrey's comments.

=== Johnny Marr & the Healers: 1996–2003 ===
In 2000, Starkey was a founding member of Johnny Marr & the Healers, although their first album, Boomslang, would not be released for another three years after which the band did a world tour in 2003. On 14 April 2001, he featured in both of the backing bands for the "Steve Marriott Tribute Concert", in which he appeared along with Rick Wills, Rabbit Bundrick, Bobby Tench, Noel Gallagher and Paul Weller.

=== Oasis (Touring guest member) ===
Starkey was a touring guest member for the band Oasis from 2004 and was also featured on two tracks included on the Who's biographical album, The Who: Then and Now. In May 2005, Noel Gallagher told the BBC that Starkey had participated in the recording sessions for Don't Believe the Truth although he was never an official member of the band. Starkey had recorded all but one track of these sessions which were originally called "Mucky Fingers" and were also for an official promotional video for the album. After the completion of these sessions Starkey stated: "It was amazing. They're all singers, they're all guitar players, they're all songwriters, they're all producers and they're all drummers."

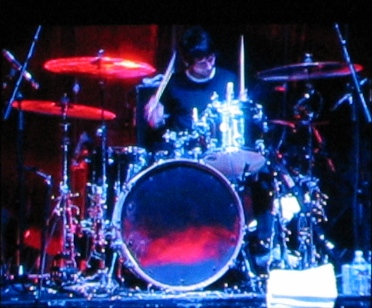
Starkey on stage with Oasis in 2005

He travelled as a sideman on the year-long Oasis tour that followed and appeared in promotional videos for the associated singles. Despite this, he was not an official member of the band and rarely appeared with them in promotions. In April 2005, Noel Gallagher confirmed that Starkey was still a member of the Who. On 14 February 2007, Starkey appeared with Oasis when they received the BRIT Award for outstanding contribution to music.

Starkey recalled that playing with them was "massive" and called the band "some of the smartest musicians I've ever met".

=== Penguins Rising ===
In 2008, Starkey formed the band Penguins Rising which had previously been called Penguin, along with his partner Sharna Liguz. The band's original lineup also included his daughter Tatia. Penguins Rising went on to support Kasabian and Beady Eye on their respective tours. They released an album under the moniker of Pengu!ns, entitled Hatemale, in 2011. Sshh signed to BMG as a solo artist in 2018, and the duo toured Australia opening for Primal Scream and then Liam Gallagher in support of the Sshh single "Rising Tide".

=== Jamaica, reggae albums: 2016–present ===
Starkey went on to build a studio in Ocho Rios and formed the in-house recording group with Sshh Liguz, Sly & Robbie, Tony Chin, Cyril Neville and Robbie Lyn. In 2016, he launched the record label Trojan Jamaica based on the island, co-funded by BMG Rights Management. The Trojan name was licensed for use from the Trojan Records label. The label was formed with a mandate to reflect music from Jamaica along with soul and blues from America. Recording on Trojan Jamaica and with the roles of co-producer and guitarist he is credited on the albums 'Red Gold Green & Blue', 'Red Gold Green & Blue RMXZ' both released in 2019. In 2020, RGGB RMXZ was released, while Got to Be Tough by Toots and the Maytals followed the same year. This won a Grammy for Best Reggae Album that year. Additionally, the album Solid Gold was released by U-Roy, featuring Ziggy Marley, Santigold, Shaggy, Big Youth, Mick Jones of the Clash (Starkey has previously gigged with Jones), Richie Spice, Tarrus Riley, Jesse Royal, and Rygin King. At this time, Starkey and his partner's band Sshh appeared at the invitation of the Peter Tosh Museum in Kingston, Jamaica, performing their version of "Get Up, Stand Up" (featuring Soul Syndicate and Eddie Vedder).

=== Solo Concerts ===
On February 20, 2026, Zak Starkey premiered a solo multimedia production, Zak Starkey... Who? An Evening of Drums and Conversation, at the Gramercy Theatre in New York City. The performance opened with a film featuring previously unseen footage and photographs from his personal collection. The show's format integrated autobiographical storytelling and live drumming performed in synchronization with on-screen videos of past collaborators, including The Who, Oasis, Toots and the Maytals, Johnny Marr, and Mantra of the Cosmos. The event also featured a Q&A segment moderated by Marky Ramone; Starkey has described their professional relationship as being "drum-curious" about one another's styles.

== Personal life ==
In 1985, Starkey married Sarah Menikides (b. 1959). They separated in 2006 and divorced in 2021. They had a daughter, Tatia Jayne (born 7 September 1985).

Starkey married Sharna Liguz, his partner of 18 years, on 21 March 2022. The couple had chosen the date in honour of their daughter, Luna Lee Lightnin, who was born a year earlier. The wedding was held at the Sunset Marquis Hotel in West Hollywood, California. Eddie Vedder and Johnny Marr served as Starkey's best men, while reggae musician Pato Banton officiated the ceremony.

== Associated acts ==
- The Icicle Works (1988)
- Ringo Starr & His All-Starr Band (1992–1995)
- The Semantics (1992–1993)
- Roger Daltrey (1994–1995)
- Face (1995–1996)
- The Who (1996–2025)*
- The Lightning Seeds (1997–2000)
- Johnny Marr and the Healers (2000–2003)
- Oasis (2004–2008)

== Discography ==
- Artists United Against Apartheid – Sun City (1985)
- Roger Daltrey – Under a Raging Moon (1985)
- ASAP – Silver and Gold (1989)
- Ringo Starr – Ringo Starr and His All-Starr Band (1990)
- Ringo Starr – Ringo Starr and His All-Starr Band Volume 2: Live from Montreux (1993)
- Tony Martin – Back Where I Belong (1992)
- Moody Marsden Band – Never Turn Our Back on the Blues (1992)
- Robert Hart – Robert Hart (1992)
- Eikichi Yazawa – Anytime Woman (1992)
- The Semantics – Powerbill (1996)
- John Entwistle – The Rock (1996)
- Simon Townshend – Among Us (1996)
- Ringo Starr – Ringo Starr and His Third All-Starr Band Volume 1 (1996)
- Eddie Hardin – Wizard's Convention, Vol. 2 (1997)
- The Lightning Seeds – Like You Do (1997)
- The Lightning Seeds – Tilt (1999)
- Sasha – Surfin' on a Backbeat (2001)
- Johnny Marr and the Healers – Boomslang (2003)
- The Who – Then and Now (2004)
- Oasis – Don't Believe the Truth (2005)
- The Who – Endless Wire (2006)
- Paul Weller and Graham Coxon – "This Old Town" (2007)
- Broken English – The Rough with the Smooth (2007)
- Oasis – Dig Out Your Soul (2008)
- SSHH – Issues (2016)
- Various – Red Gold Green & Blue (2019)
- The Who – Who (2019)
- Toots and the Maytals – Got to Be Tough (2020)
- U-Roy – Solid Gold (2021)
- Mick Fleetwood & Friends – Celebrate the Music of Peter Green and the Early Years of Fleetwood Mac (2021)
