= Saturday Nights & Sunday Mornings =

Studio album by Counting Crows
- Released: March 25, 2008
- Recorded: June 2006 – February 2007 (Saturday Nights) March–April 2007 (Sunday Mornings)
- Genres: Alternative rock, folk rock
- Length: 59:54
- Label: Geffen
- Producers: Gil Norton; Brian Deck; Dennis Herring; Steve Lillywhite; David Lowery

Counting Crows chronology
New Amsterdam: Live at Heineken Music Hall February 4–6, 2003 (2006)	Saturday Nights & Sunday Mornings (2008)	iTunes Live from SoHo (2008)

Singles from Saturday Nights & Sunday Mornings
- 1. "1492" Released: January 12, 2008; 2. "You Can't Count on Me" Released: February 4, 2008; 3. "Come Around" Released: June 2008(Triple A airplay only); 4. "When I Dream of Michelangelo" Released: December 2008 (Triple A airplay only)

Professional ratings
Aggregate scores
Source	Rating
Metacritic	(63/100)
Review scores
Source	Rating
AbsolutePunk.net	76%
Allmusic	4.5/5 stars
Daily Mirror	4/5 stars
Entertainment Weekly	B−
The Guardian	2/5 stars
musicOMH	2/5 stars
Paste	(4/10)
PopMatters	5/10 stars
Rolling Stone	3/5 stars
Slant Magazine	2/5 stars

Saturday Nights & Sunday Mornings is the fifth studio album by American rock band Counting Crows, released in the United States on March 25, 2008. It is thematically divided into two sides: the rock music of Saturday Nights and the more country-influenced Sunday Mornings. Vocalist and lyricist Adam Duritz states that the album "is about really wanting to mean something and failing to do it. You want your life to mean something. You want to be somebody and then what you turn out to be is so much less than what you thought you were going to be."

The Saturday Nights portion was produced by Gil Norton (who also produced the band's second album, Recovering the Satellites), while Sunday Mornings was produced by Brian Deck, perhaps best known for his production work on Modest Mouse's album The Moon and Antarctica.

The album debuted at number 3 on the Billboard 200, the band's highest peak since Recovering the Satellites and it sold 106,000 copies in first week. The cover depicts the Empire State Building in New York City.

== Recording ==
After aggressively touring for five years, lead singer Adam Duritz explained he had, emotionally and physically, reached a nadir:

At the end of it I had totally lost my mind. Not that I wasn't doing it for 20 years already, but there was this moment when my grandmother died and I lost this girl I had been dating all in the same five-minute moment, where I got the phone call from both of them at the same moment, while sitting in a hotel room in Perth [Australia], literally the most isolated city on Earth. There is no other major city that is as far from other cities as Perth on earth. And the sense of being so far from everywhere I was supposed to be in life was so palpable. That was the egg cracking. There wasn't much egg left anyway, but that just cracked me. After that, I just stopped. We played some gigs, but I was essentially done. I walked off the plane to go to the funeral. I mean, I almost didn't do that, and then we didn’t do anything for a while. I mean, we played. We still toured every summer. We did some gigs here and there, but I didn't want to make any more records. I knew I didn't know how to live anymore. I knew I had lost my mind. I knew that I'd never make it through another tour, but I also thought, "You can't stop fucking around with this. This is really serious mental illness and you've got to figure out your life before you go and do this again, because there's nowhere lower that you can go." I was wrong about that actually; it did get a lot worse.

However, Duritz acknowledged that, upon listening to "1492" (then an out-take from the Hard Candy sessions) that he began thinking: "There's this album here":

Suddenly, I thought, “We have to go in the studio now. Right now.” Everyone came to NYC in June—I still wasn't capable of leaving home—and we did 20 days or something. We got the basis of Saturday Nights, which is all the record was at that time. Then we went on tour, and afterward I just went completely down the pipe and we never went back to work on it.

After initial slow progress, Duritz has mentioned that, realizing Gil Norton was scheduled to produce the Foo Fighters' record "Echoes, Silence, Patience and Grace" at the beginning of March, the band agreed to reconvene with Norton for another several weeks to complete the material at hand.

Despite the band initially intending to release a single album under the "Saturday Nights" concept, Duritz began contemplating a companion piece for the record as they were finalizing their existing material:

When we came back to finish it, my life had changed a little bit by then and I started thinking about another set of songs and a possible different album that might work as a companion piece to this one that would fit together, but I wasn’t sure what it was. The further we sort of started to explore it and we started to demo some of those songs, we set up a studio in the lounge where we were recording what became ‘Saturday Nights’ and we started sort of trying some of these songs out and trying to think of ways to arrange that kind of music ‘cause it was very different. I didn’t want us to do an unplugged record. I think a lot of folk music has become this unplugged thing and it never was intended to be that way. It was a very creative art form at one point, making folk records. As we started to explore that, I started to realize there was a whole other record there. Then I realized I wanted to do it with someone totally different and not like ‘Satellite’ but totally separate. Then I sort of thought of the title and the fact that there were two records there and then we started looking for producers and I started looking into who was making the best indie folk music ‘cause that’s where the really good stuff is.

Duritz claimed the band's decision to draft Brian Deck as the producer for the "Sunday Mornings" half of the record came out of frequent Internet research:

On my computer, I had iTunes, Allmusic.com and Amazon all up at once and I was going through all of those and reading about different bands and different records and listening to them in iTunes, clips of them, and then downloading them or buying them or ordering them if they weren’t available ‘cause a lot of them were really indie so they weren’t available on iTunes. Then I read about the band or I read about the band’s influence and who produced it and look at other records that he produced and sort of chase it around. I was running all the branches of this tree, sort of following them all over the place. I started to realize this name that was popping up all over the place, which was Brian. So I went to allmusic.com to find Deck and the guy made like 50 records since 2000, so I listened to all these records that he made and felt like he was doing a lot of really, really creative work in this sort of genre. Not just unplugged records that were just a guy with an acoustic guitar, but that were really creatively arranged, interesting records. I called him up and he came out and hung out with us and listened to what we were working on and we decided to do it with Brian and that’s how it all developed.

After some initial studio sessions and brainstorming, Duritz then realized a thematic significance and cohesion of the two records:

‘Sunday Mornings’ is mostly about failing and getting better. When it’s time to change your life, you don’t necessarily know what it takes to get it right, right away. So you mostly fail, but you’re still different from heading downhill. Most of ‘Sunday Mornings’ is about failure, but like I said, it’s mostly different from still heading downhill. Even the last song, ‘Come Around’ is about getting dumped or losing a relationship. It’s also about not letting that ruin your life and deciding to go out and play some rock and roll anyway. Whereas on ‘Saturday Night’ in songs like ‘Sundays’ or ‘Hanging Tree’ there’s a huge amount of bitterness or ‘Cowboys,’ the loss of someone and the attachment and the untethered feeling that comes with it is very angry and bitter and it drives the person getting out of it. It’s also like ‘well, it happened,’ and I go get on a bus. It began in ‘Washington Square’ which takes about leaving home. It’s a very sad thought, and there’s suffering for it, but it’s still a decision to go out there again.

Duritz also described the recording process for "You Can't Count On Me":

The acoustic demos we cut at my apartment while we were finishing Saturday Nights all sucked for the same reason my original demo sort of sucked: they were too pretty. So when we went out to Berkeley to record Sunday Mornings, we took a different tack.

We started out electric, figuring it would make a jarring centerpiece to the latter album. It didn’t work. The drums and bass made the song too bombastic. It wasn’t jarring at all. It was just turning into an arena rock power ballad. Which sucked. So then we took the drums and the electric guitar out and went back to playing it acoustically with a dobro, an upright bass and some percussion but that just had no balls at all so we had to abandon that as well. Because that really sucked.

Finally, after singing about 20 versions of the song that day, I went out to dinner and most of the guys went home. I came back a few hours later to find our drummer Jim and our producer scurrying around the hallways excitedly between our studio and one down the hall that was empty. They’d had an idea. They set up a really stripped down drum kit in the small square room with only three mics: two over heads about 3-ft above the kit and one kick drum mic about 6-7 feet away from the kick (as opposed to inside the drum where you’d normally put it). By setting it up this way, you could beat the living crap out of the drums and they never sounded big or bombastic.

They’re violent but they go 'crack' instead of 'boom'. We called our bass player Millard, woke him up, and made him run back to the studio with this little Hofner Beatle Bass. Then, with everything we’d recorded muted (except the piano track so we had something to play to), Jim, Millard, and me played the song as hard and as loud as we could play it. We had Jim keep his high hat open so it sounded really sloppy and we just beat the crap out of the song until we had this insane aggro version of it. Then we went home.

The next day when the other guys came in, Brian had them set up to play the pretty acoustic version but made them play it to these insane drums, bass, and vocal tracks. And that didn’t suck at all. It worked. The song would seem really pretty and then it would blow up in your face. You could hear all the violence and the edge in the drums and bass without overwhelming piano arpeggios or picking acoustic guitar. The last step was finding the thing to go on top. I’d always wanted someone to slash at it with a distorted electric guitar like a Replacements song and Dan had been trying out just that sound on some other song so I had him play it on this song instead. We made him play as hard as he could because we wanted mistakes and bad notes and some dissonance. Dan just killed it. He was inspired and a little disturbing. We actually got more than HE wanted. Brian and I loved it but we had to talk Dan out of fixing some of it.

From mid-March through mid-April 2007, the band recorded "Sunday Mornings" in Berkeley. After Duritz took a two-week break, the band would reconvene with their engineer James Brown to mix the "Saturday Nights" half of the record from late-April to mid-May, followed finally by over three weeks of intensive mixing of "Sunday Mornings" throughout the remainder of May 2007. By early June the album was mastered. The album was the first album in which featured Jonah Soucy the nephew at the time of Band Manager Joel Soucy. This was one of 2 albums Jonah was featured on.

== Release ==
Initially, the band planned on releasing "Saturday Nights and Sunday Mornings" in November 2007. However, Duritz directly requested to Geffen Records to postpone the album's release until early 2008, citing the lack of promotional preparation including the selection of a single and album photography as the reasoning to do so. The label agreed, and the album's release date was moved back to March 25, 2008.

The album was also the #1 Amazon.com download upon its original release, additionally mentioned while performing on The View by Whoopi Goldberg (a friend of Adam Duritz).

== Singles ==
On January 16, 2008, the band released a digital single as a free download on their official website. It comprises the songs "1492" (as the A-side) and "When I Dream of Michelangelo" (as the B-side). The latter song appeared at the end of an episode of the ABC series Brothers & Sisters.

The lead commercial single, "You Can't Count on Me," was released to radio on February 4, 2008. A music video for the song was released on March 20, 2008. It would go on to peak at No. 2 on Billboard's Adult Alternative chart (also known as the Triple A format), held off the top spot by R.E.M's "Supernatural Superserious" and briefly charted on the Billboard Hot Adult Contemporary Singles chart, peaking at No. 35.

While there has been no follow-up physical single releases, two album tracks have been serviced as airplay singles to the Adult Alternative format; both of which have enjoyed strong airplay. "Come Around" first charted the format in summer of 2008, and went on to top the chart the week of September 19, 2008 (it remained the #1 single for four weeks). A third track, "When I Dream of Michelangelo" (previously released as half of the "digital 45" that preceded the release of the album) would make its first chart appearance on the Adult Alternative chart in December 2008, and has since peaked at No. 7.

== Track listing ==
All songs written by Adam Duritz except where noted.

Saturday Nights

All songs produced by Gil Norton except where noted.

1. "1492" – 3:50 (produced by Norton and Steve Lillywhite)
2. "Hanging Tree" (Duritz, Dan Vickrey) – 3:50
3. "Los Angeles" (Duritz, Ryan Adams, Dave Gibbs) – 4:40
4. "Sundays" – 4:21 (produced by Norton, Dennis Herring, and David Lowery)
5. "Insignificant" (Duritz, Vickrey, Charles Gillingham, David Immerglück) – 4:14
6. "Cowboys" – 5:22

Sunday Mornings

All songs produced by Brian Deck except where noted.

7. "Washington Square" – 4:17
8. "On Almost Any Sunday Morning" – 2:58
9. "When I Dream of Michelangelo" (Duritz, Gillingham, Immerglück, Vickrey) – 3:10
10. "Anyone But You" (Duritz, Gillingham, Immerglück) – 5:25
11. "You Can't Count on Me" – 3:16
12. "Le Ballet D'or" (Duritz, Gillingham, Immerglück) – 5:01
13. "On a Tuesday in Amsterdam Long Ago" (Duritz, Gillingham) – 4:57
14. "Come Around" (Duritz, Vickrey) – 4:31 (produced by Norton)

Dutch bonus track

15. "Wennen aan September" (acoustic; featuring Bløf)

UK bonus track

15. "Baby, I'm a Big Star Now" – 5:59

iTunes Store bonus tracks

15. "There Goes Everything" (Duritz, Immerglück)
16. "Come Around" (acoustic version)
17. "Sessions" (Duritz, Gillingham, Immerglück) – 4:17
18. "Sunday Morning L.A." (Duritz, Gillingham, Immerglück) – 5:48

The iTunes Store version also includes a track-by-track interview with Duritz.

== Personnel ==
Counting Crows

- Jim Bogios – drums, sleigh bells, tambourine, maracas, percussion, vocals
- David Bryson – guitar, vocals
- Adam Duritz – vocals
- Charlie Gillingham – keyboards, vocals
- David Immergluck – guitar, vocals
- Millard Powers – bass guitar, upright double bass, vocals
- Dan Vickrey – guitar, banjo, keyboard, vocals

Additional musicians

- Brian Deck – piano plucking
- Dave Gibbs – vocal arrangements and backing vocals on "Los Angeles"
- Dennis Herring – dobro, acoustic guitar on "Sundays"
- Matt Malley – bass guitar on "Sundays" and "Baby, I'm a Big Star Now"
- Ben Mize – drums on "Los Angeles", "Sundays" and "Baby, I'm a Big Star Now"

Production

- Brian Deck – Sunday Mornings (except "Come Around")
- Dennis Herring – co-production on "Sundays"
- Steve Lillywhite – co-production on "1492"
- David Lowery – co-production on "Sundays"
- Gil Norton – Saturday Nights and "Come Around", co-production on "1492" and "Sundays"

== Charts ==
=== Weekly charts ===
Chart (2008)	Peak position
Australian Albums (ARIA)	22
Belgian Albums (Ultratop Flanders)	31
Belgian Albums (Ultratop Wallonia)	98
Canadian Albums (Billboard)	8
Dutch Albums (Album Top 100)	5
German Albums (Offizielle Top 100)	57
Irish Albums (IRMA)	28
New Zealand Albums (RMNZ)	36
Norwegian Albums (VG-lista)	27
Scottish Albums (Official Charts)	16
Swedish Albums (Sverigetopplistan)	32
Swiss Albums (Schweizer Hitparade)	57
UK Albums (Official Charts)	12
US Billboard 200	3
US Top Rock Albums (Billboard)	2

=== Year-end charts ===
Chart (2008)	Position
US Billboard 200	148

=== Singles ===
Year	Single	Chart	Peak Position
2008	"You Can't Count on Me"	Billboard Hot Adult Top 40 Tracks	34
2008	"You Can't Count on Me"	Billboard Pop 100	80
