= Millard Powers =

American musician (born 1965)

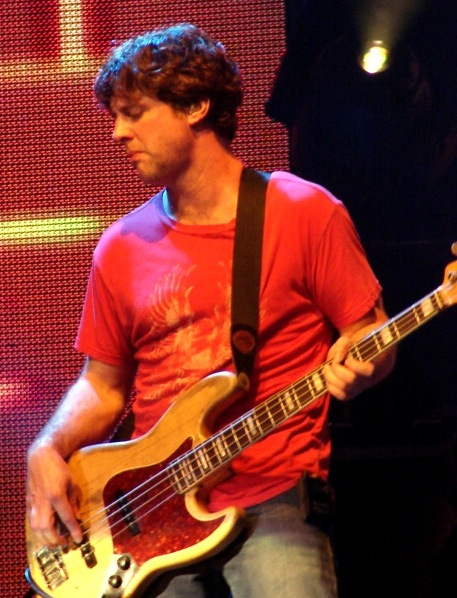
- Powers performing with Counting Crows, August 21, 2006 Starwood Amphitheater, Nashville, Tennessee

Background information
- Born: Avery Millard Powers III; December 24, 1965 (age 60); Greensboro, North Carolina
- Genres: Rock; power pop
- Occupations: Musician; engineer; songwriter; singer
- Instrument: Bass

Avery Millard Powers III (born December 24, 1965) is an American musician, songwriter, record producer, and Grammy-nominated recording engineer. While a student at the University of North Carolina at Greensboro in the 1980s, he collaborated with fellow student Ben Folds and with Alabama-based singer-songwriter Owsley, both of which he continued to work with as a musician and as a producer for the next several decades. Since 2005, he has played bass guitar in the band Counting Crows.

== Career ==
=== Early history ===
Powers studied piano for six years, and played trumpet in his middle school and high school bands for five years. He went on to study guitar performance and communications at University of North Carolina at Greensboro.

=== Majosha ===
Majosha was a band formed around early 1988 with Ben Folds on bass, Powers on guitar, and Dave Rich on drums. They played their first show at Duke University's Battle of the Bands in 1988 and won. Majosha released an EP, Party Night: Five Songs About Jesus in 1988, which contained four tracks, none of which were about Jesus. After gaining popularity, they released their first album, Shut Up and Listen to Majosha in 1989. Around the same time, they did a dance mix of "Get That Bug" which was released in Japan. The band's label was Fresh Avery Records. All tracks were produced by Folds and Powers.

=== The Semantics ===
The Semantics, a power-pop band formed by Millard Powers and Will Owsley, featured Jody Spence and Ringo Starr's son, Zak Starkey. Ben Folds appeared on drums on two demos which were not released and on keyboard at a few live performances. Folds was not involved with the creative aspects of the group. The band was signed to Geffen Records, and their album Powerbill, initially slated for release through Geffen Records in 1993, was released in Japan through Alfa International on December 21, 1996.

=== Solo album ===
Powers released a self-titled solo album in 2001. Powers played all instruments (bass, guitar, drums, keyboard), recorded, produced, mixed, and engineered the album himself in his apartment in Nashville, Tennessee. No other artists were featured on the album.

==== Track listing ====
1. Pamela (4:28)
2. One More Step (3:34)
3. Jerry Deacon (2:26)
4. Gone (2:49)
5. She's So Clean (2:26)
6. Heart Attack (2:55)
7. Simple Thing (3:04)
8. Jenny Won't Play Fair (2:19)
9. Vegas (4:12)

=== Production and engineering ===
Powers was nominated for a Grammy Award for Best Engineered Album in 1999 for his work on the album Owsley by American singer-songwriter and guitarist Will Owsley.

=== Touring ===
He has played with acts such as Counting Crows, Keith Urban, Amy Grant, Ben Folds, Holly Williams, Cyndi Thomson, Greta Gaines, Anita Cochran, and Butterfly Boucher.

== Counting Crows ==
Following longtime bassist Matt Malley's departure from the band in late 2004, Powers began touring with Counting Crows. He played his first show on April 22, 2005, in Denver, Colorado, and would eventually join the band full-time. Powers plays bass guitar, upright double bass, piano, and performs live vocals. He's recorded on each of the band's studio albums since 2008's Saturday Nights & Sunday Mornings, as well as two live releases. He also appears on a Counting Crows compilation album.

=== Saturday Nights & Sunday Mornings ===
Saturday Nights & Sunday Mornings was released March 25, 2008. The album debuted at #3 on the Billboard 200 and #1 on iTunes. This is the fifth studio album by Counting Crows. It is thematically divided into two sides: the rock music of Saturday Nights and the more country-influenced Sunday Mornings. The Saturday Nights portion was produced by Gil Norton (who also produced the band's second album, Recovering the Satellites), while Sunday Mornings was produced by Brian Deck.

Powers's contribution to the album is listed in the liner notes as, "bass guitar, upright double bass, general all-around unflappable musical genius ... and vocals."

=== Live From Soho ===
iTunes Live from SoHo was recorded on March 27, 2008, at an in-store performance in Apple's famous SoHo location in New York City. This album was an iTunes exclusive. Powers plays bass and upright double bass.

=== Aural 6 ===
Aural 6 is an EP released on November 27, 2008. The Best Buy-exclusive compilation sampler contains tracks from several of their previous albums, including Saturday Nights & Sunday Mornings. This was one of a series of six-song EPs released at Best Buy on Black Friday, 2008.

=== Underwater Sunshine (Or What We Did On Our Summer Vacation) ===
Underwater Sunshine (Or What We Did On Our Summer Vacation) was released April 10, 2012. The album consists of nothing but cover songs. The band chose to re-record several songs that they have previously released, including "Amie," "Four White Stallions," "Ooh La La," "You Ain't Going Nowhere" as well as songs they have not previously performed.

== Television appearances ==
Powers has made multiple television appearances on Good Morning America, The Today Show, The View, the Late Show with David Letterman, The Tonight Show with Jay Leno, and many other programs between 1991 and present. In 2005 he appeared in 10 episodes of the program Three Wishes, with Amy Grant. In 2009, Powers performed on the U.K. series Live from Abbey Road with Counting Crows.

== Discography ==
Powers has taken a role in the following works:

=== 2010-present ===
- 2014: Somewhere Under Wonderland, Counting Crows (bass guitar, harmony vocals)
- 2013: Echoes of the Outlaw Roadshow, Counting Crows (bass guitar, backing vocals)
- 2012: Underwater Sunshine (Or What We Did On Our Summer Vacation), Counting Crows (bass, acoustic guitar, upright double bass, backing vocals)

=== 2000-2009 ===
- 2009: Lines, Vines and Trying Times, Jonas Brothers (12 string acoustic guitar)
- 2008: Aural 6, Counting Crows (bass)
- 2008: Live from Soho, Counting Crows (bass, upright double bass)
- 2008: Saturday Nights & Sunday Mornings, Counting Crows (bass, upright double bass, vocals)
- 2008: Whiskey Thoughts, Greta Gaines (bass)
- 2008: Raiders of the Lost Hook Volume 3, various artists (featured artist, Heart Attack)
- 2006: Time Again... Amy Grant Live (CD & DVD), Amy Grant (bass, vocals)
- 2005: Popcorn And A Mama Who Loves Me Too, Swan Dive (bass, Moog bass)
- 2004: It Was Hot, Greta Gaines (bass, vocals)
- 2004: The Hard Way, Owsley (bass)
- 2003: Memory Girls, Warren Zanes (bass, vocals)
- 2001: Millard Powers, Millard Powers
- 2001: Gypsy Flat Road, Sandra McCracken (bass)
- 2001: Covered, Sarah Siskind (bass)
- 2000: Six Songs of Mine, Sarah Siskind (bass)

=== 1990-1999 ===
- 1999: Deep Volume 3, Various Artists (Featured Artist, She's So Clean)
- 1999: Greta Gaines, Greta Gaines (bass)
- 1999: Owsley, Owsley (producer, engineer, songwriter)
- 1998: Nashpop: A Nashville Pop Collection, various artists (featured artist, She's So Clean)
- 1998: Ten: The Birthday Album, Various Artists (bass, engineer)
- 1993: Powerbill, The Semantics (songwriter, producer, musician)
- 1992: The World as Best as I Remember It, Volume Two, Rich Mullins (vocals)

=== 1980-1989 ===
- 1989: Shut Up and Listen to Majosha, Majosha (guitar, mandolin, vocals, producer)
- 1988: Party Night: Five Songs About Jesus, Majosha (guitar, vocals, producer)
