= SH =

SH may refer to:

== Places and transportation ==
- Saint Helena (ISO 3166 digram and FIPS PUB 10-4 territory code)
- Canton of Schaffhausen, Switzerland
- Schleswig-Holstein, a state of Germany
- Shanghai, China (Guobiao abbreviation SH)
- Shatin Hospital, a hospital in Shatin, Hong Kong
- Shortstown, England
- South Horizons
- State highway
- FlyMe (IATA airline designator SH), a defunct airline

== Language ==
- sh (digraph), a letter combination used in some languages
  - Voiceless postalveolar fricative [ʃ], the sound usually spelt sh in English
- sh (letter), a letter of the Albanian alphabet
- sh, IETF language tag and deprecated ISO 639-1 code for Serbo-Croatian

== Science, technology, and mathematics ==
=== Computing and telecommunications ===
- Lib Sh, a graphics metaprogramming library for C++
- Unix shell, a general command-line shell for Unix
  - Bourne shell, a command-line shell for Unix
  - Thompson shell, a command-line shell for Unix
- sh, Store Half, an RISC-V instruction
- SuperH, a Hitachi microcontroller
- Sensor hub
- An interface type in the IP Multimedia Subsystem
- .sh, the country code top-level domain (ccTLD) of Saint Helena
- Sharp Corporation's mobile phones in Japan

=== Mathematics ===
- Hyperbolic sine (sh), a mathematical function
- Suslin hypothesis, in mathematical set theory

=== Earth science ===
- Siberian High, in meteorology
- Seismic Handler, a program that used in seismology

=== Other uses in science ===
- -SH, representing the thiol functional group in a chemical structure diagram
- Sherwood number, in engineering

== Other uses ==
- Sacred Heart Cathedral Preparatory, a school in San Francisco, California, USA
- Sacred Heart University
- Sonatrach, an Algerian oil company
- Sacrifice hit, in baseball scoring
- Self-harm, where people intentionally hurt themselves
- Sheikh, an honorific title in the Arabic language
- Silent Hill, video game franchise of survival horror
- Sherlock Holmes, a fictional detective created by Arthur Conan Doyle
- HS or SH Solar Hijri calendar, the modern Iranian calendar
- An abbreviation for shilling

== See also ==
- Sha (Cyrillic), the letter ш, transliterated into English script as "sh"
