= My Life with the Thrill Kill Kult discography =

- Studio albums: 11
- Extended plays: 2
- Soundtrack albums: 4
- Live albums: 1
- Compilation albums: 4
- Singles: 10
- Video albums: 2
- Remix albums: 6
- Compilations with various artists: 1

The American electronic industrial rock band My Life with the Thrill Kill Kult has released ten studio albums, one live album, three compilation albums, two video albums, six remix albums, three extended plays, and ten singles. In addition, their songs have been featured on three soundtrack albums and one promotional single for major Hollywood films.

They began their career on the independent record label Wax Trax! Records, which, like the band, was based in Chicago. In 1991, their single "Sexplosion!" from the album of the same name became a top 10 dance club hit in the U.S. Following this success, Thrill Kill Kult was signed by the major label Interscope Records, which re-released the Sexplosion! album. On Interscope, the band achieved their biggest hit, "Sex On Wheelz", which reached the top 20 on both the dance club and alternative U.S. charts.

The band's 1993 Interscope album 13 Above the Night was their only album to chart, reaching #194 on the Billboard top 200 albums chart. The album provided two more dance chart hits, "Blue Buddha" and "Final Blindness". After one more Interscope album, Thrill Kill Kult briefly moved to Red Ant Records in the late 1990s. Their releases since 2000 have been on Rykodisc and/or the band's own label, Sleazebox Records.

Thrill Kill Kult's songs have also been featured (along with other artists) on three soundtrack albums for the films Cool World (1992), The Crow (1994), and Showgirls (1995), as well as a promo-only single for the film The Flintstones (1994).

== Studio albums ==
The following table is a summary of My Life with the Thrill Kill Kult's studio albums.

Year	Title	Record label	Notes
1988	I See Good Spirits and I See Bad Spirits	Wax Trax! Records	
1990	Confessions of a Knife...	Wax Trax! Records	
1991	Sexplosion!	Wax Trax! Records, Interscope Records	
1993	13 Above the Night	Interscope Records	#194 Billboard 200 Albums
1995	Hit & Run Holiday	Interscope Records	
1997	A Crime for All Seasons	Red Ant Records	
2001	The Reincarnation of Luna	SleazeBox Records	
2005	Gay, Black and Married	Rykodisc	
2007	The Filthiest Show in Town	Rykodisc	
2009	Death Threat	Rykodisc, SleazeBox Records	
2014	Spooky Tricks	SleazeBox Records	
2019	In the House of Strange Affairs	SleazeBox Records	

== Remix albums ==
Year	Title	Record label	Notes
1999	Dirty Little Secrets: Music to Strip by...	Rykodisc	
2002	Golden Pillz: The Luna Remixes	SleazeBox Records	
2004	Diamonds & Daggerz	Rykodisc	Contains both new and classic songs extensively reworked and remixed into one continuous mix.
2005	My Life Remixed: A Remix Tribute to My Life with the Thrill Kill Kult	Red Ant Records	Contains remixes by other artists.
2007	Blood + Dope + Sin + Gold	SleazeBox Records	This CD was only available at the merchandise booth on the 2007 tour. It features remixes from The Filthiest Show in Town, Gay, Black and Married, and The Reincarnation of Luna.
2010	Sinister Whisperz - Volume One: The "Wax Trax" Years (1987–1991)	SleazeBox Records, Rustblade (Europe)	This CD contains remixes of songs from the Wax Trax! years (1987–1991).
2016	Sinister Whisperz II: The Interscope Years (1992–1996)	SleazeBox Records	This CD contains remixes of songs from the Interscope years (1992–1996).
2020	Sinister Whisperz III: The Rykodisc Years	SleazeBox Records	This CD contains remixes of songs from the Rykodisc years.
2021	Sleazy Action	SleazeBox Records	This CD contains a compilation of 12 previously unreleased remixes by TKK's Buzz McCoy, including tracks from related side-project Bomb Gang Girlz and new songs by Buzz McCoy and Groovie Mann’s Darling Kandie.

== Live albums ==
Year	Title	Record label	Notes
2002	Elektrik Inferno Live	SleazeBox Records	

== Compilation albums ==
Year	Title	Record label	Notes
1989	Kooler Than Jesus	Wax Trax! Records	The original vinyl version of this CD was only the first two tracks. The cassette and CD versions added the tracks from the first two releases My Life with the Thrill Kill Kult (Wax 039) and Some Have to Dance, Some Have to Kill (Wax 055) which had been vinyl only.
1998	Some Have to Dance... Some Have to Kill	Red Ant Records	This album is different from the earlier release of the same name. This version was a promo-only release sold during the band's 1998 tour.
2004	The Be(a)st of TKK	Rykodisc	
2004	My Life with the Thrill Kill Kult	Rykodisc	This CD is a compilation of the following singles and EPs: My Life with the Thrill Kill Kult 12" (1987), Some Have to Dance, Some Have to Kill 12" (1988), Kooler Than Jesus (1989), 'Cuz It's Hot (1990), plus 4 bonus tracks. Several tracks are shorter than the original WaxTrax versions.

== Extended plays ==
Year	Title	Record label	Notes
1987	My Life with the Thrill Kill Kult	Wax Trax! Records	This 12" was the band's first release (WAX 039) before I See Good Spirits and I See Bad Spirits. Side one is the track "First Cut", and is 45 RPM. Side two has "Shock of Point 6" and "Resisting the Spirit", and is 33 1/3 RPM.
1988	Some Have to Dance, Some Have to Kill	Wax Trax! Records	Released on July 26, 1988 (WAX 055), this 12" EP featured the songs "Nervous Xians" and "The Devil Does Drugs", with test pressings also including "Easy Girl" and "Acid Xians".

== Singles ==
Year	Title	Record label	Notes
1989	"Kooler Than Jesus"	Wax Trax!	12" vinyl not to be confused with the compilation album of the same name
1990	"A Girl Doesn't Get Killed by a Make-Believe Lover... 'Cuz It's Hot"	Wax Trax!	B-side is "A Daisy Chain 4 Satan", a remix of which is the first track on Confessions of a Knife
1991	"Naïve/The Days of Swine & Roses"	Wax Trax!	#39 Billboard Dance Singles Sales (split single with KMFDM)
1991	"Sexplosion!"	Wax Trax!	#10 Billboard Dance Club Songs
1992	"Sex on Wheelz"	Interscope	#15 Billboard Dance Club Songs, #17 Billboard Alternative Songs
1993	"Blue Buddha"	Interscope, Atlantic	#17 Billboard Dance Club Songs
1993	"Final Blindness"	Interscope, Atlantic	#39 Billboard Dance Club Songs (limited edition 7" & 12" versions)
1995	"Hit & Run Holiday"	Interscope, MCA	
1997	"Sexy Sucker"	Red Ant Records	

== Video albums ==
Year	Title	Record label	Notes
1996	Ride The Mindway Kult Kompilation 89-96	Mindway Corporation	VHS
2004	The Kult Kollection	Rykodisc	DVD

== Soundtracks ==
- Cool World featured the songs "Sex on Wheelz" and "Her Sassy Kiss" (1992). The film itself contained three other Thrill Kill Kult songs: "The Devil Does Drugs", "Sedusa", and "Holli's Groove". "Holli's Groove" was retitled "Strippers Only" and featured on the album Dirty Little Secrets. "Sedusa" was retitled "The Smash-Up" and appeared as a bonus track on a later compilation simply titled "My Life with the Thrill Kill Kult."
- The Crow featured the exclusive song "After the Flesh" (1994), which is a re-working of the earlier track "Nervous Xians". The band is also featured briefly in the movie performing live.
- The Flintstones (1994) featured a different version of the song "Hit & Run Holiday". A one-track promo only single was released featuring this version of the song.
- Showgirls (1995) featured two original songs, "Wasted Time" and "Someone New". The song "The Devil Does Drugs" also appears in the film, but not on the soundtrack album. Another track called "Seduction 23" was composed for the film, but swapped with "Wasted Time" near completion of the movie.
- BASEketball featured the songs "Golden Strip", "Glamour Is a Rocky Road", and "Hot Blood Risin'", but they were not on the soundtrack.
- Beavis and Butthead featured the main characters watching the video to the song "Blue Buddha"
- The Suicide Girls DVD The First Tour featured the song "Hour of Zero (Don't Mess with Illinoize Remix)"
- CSI: NY Episode 52 Season 3 "Oedipus Hex" - Guest appearance by Suicide Girls, featured the song "Hour of Zero (Don't Mess with Illinoize Remix)"
- So You Think You Can Dance Fox TV: air date 7/21/2010 - featured the song "Wasted Time"
- The Amityville Legacy (2016) featured "Spooky Tricks" in the film, but not on the official soundtrack.
- Nemesis 5: The New Model (2018) featured the Bomb Gang Girlz song "Want" in the film, but not on the official soundtrack.
