= Blood + Dope + Sin + Gold =

Remix album by My Life with the Thrill Kill Kult
- Released: 2007
- Genre: Industrial
- Label: SleazeBox Records
- Producer: Buzz McCoy

My Life with the Thrill Kill Kult remix album chronology
My Life Remixed: A Remix Tribute to My Life with the Thrill Kill Kult (2005)	Blood + Dope + Sin + Gold (2007)	Sinister Whisperz - Volume One: The "Wax Trax" Years (1987–1991) (2010)

Blood + Dope + Sin + Gold is a 2007 remix album by industrial music group My Life with the Thrill Kill Kult. It features remixes from The Filthiest Show in Town, Gay, Black and Married, and The Reincarnation of Luna.

== Track listing ==
No.	Title	Length
1.	"TV Sista" (Hong Kong Long Mix)
2.	"Born of Fire" (Cherry Pie Mix)
3.	"Freaky Fever" (Hollywood Hustler Mix)
4.	"Girl Without a Planet" (Slut of Saturn Mix)
5.	"Magic Boy Magic Girl" (Dirty Sanchez Mix)
6.	"Out 4 the Kill" (Beware of God Mix)
7.	"Hour of Zero" (Human Inferno Mix)
8.	"High Class Taboo" (Booze & Broadz Mix)
9.	"Jet Set Sex" (Cockpit Mix)
10.	"Flesh Playhouse" (Sinsexual Mix)
11.	"TV Sista" (Sorella Diavolo Mix)
12.	"Drug Chain 4 Jesus" (Speed Demon Mix)

== Personnel ==
- Buzz McCoy – producer, remixer (tracks 1–4, 6–10, 12)
- Track 5 remixed by Dirty Sanchez
- Track 11 remixed by Justin Bennett

== Release ==
The physical CD was only available at the merchandise booth on the 2007 tour, but the tracks were later made available as digital downloads from SleazeBox Records.

== Reception ==
The website industrialreviews.ru gave the release a rating of 3 out of 5 stars, writing, "The group of goofy buddies known as My Life With The Thrill Kill Kult clearly has a penchant for remixing. They're not exactly open to other people's work (perhaps their most famous achievement to date is the remix of KMFDM's "Naive" [sic]), but they're constantly reworking their own legacy. Moreover, the band almost always does all the reworking themselves, most often through their leader, Buzz McCoy. And the strangest thing is, these remixed albums sound much better than their original counterparts, even though the latter are based on the former, at least to my ears. Apparently, the additional arrangements and enhanced dance accents, while maintaining that distinctive strip club atmosphere, make the tracks even more appealing to skeptics like me. Overall, surprisingly good."
