= Hard, Fast & Beautiful (disambiguation) =

Hard, Fast and Beautiful is a 1951 American drama film.

Hard, Fast & Beautiful may also refer to:

- "Hard, Fast & Beautiful (Tight Mix)" a song by My Life with the Thrill Kill Kult from the 1999 album Dirty Little Secrets: Music to Strip By...
- "Hard, Fast & Beautiful (Club Ex Mix)" a song by My Life with the Thrill Kill Kult from the 1999 album Dirty Little Secrets: Music to Strip By...
- "Hard, Fast & Beautiful (Hellza Poppin' Mix)", a song by My Life with the Thrill Kill Kult from the 2020 album Sinister Whisperz III
