= Kiss the Goat =

Kiss the Goat may refer to:

- Kiss the Goat (Lord Belial album), 1995
- Kiss the Goat (The Electric Hellfire Club album), 1995
- "Kiss The Goat", a song by Redd Kross from Show World, 1997
