= Dirty Little Secrets: Music to Strip By... =

Remix album by My Life with the Thrill Kill Kult
- Released: 26 October 1999
- Genre: Industrial
- Label: Rykodisc
- Producer: Buzz McCoy

My Life with the Thrill Kill Kult remix album chronology
Dirty Little Secrets: Music to Strip By... (1999)	Golden Pillz: The Luna Remixes (2002)

Dirty Little Secrets: Music to Strip By... is the first remix album by industrial music group My Life with the Thrill Kill Kult. The album is a collection of remixes, b-sides, and previously unreleased tracks reminiscent of their sound from the era of Sexplosion! and Hit & Run Holiday.

== Track listing ==
No.	Title	Length
1.	"Dirty Little Secrets" ("Lula's Lounge" mix)	3:54
2.	"Strippers Only" ("China's" mix)	4:02
3.	"Hard, Fast & Beautiful" ("Tight" mix)	4:00
4.	"Operation Sex-Trip" ("High Heels" mix)	3:36
5.	"Eight of Space" ("Dreamer's" mix)	3:14
6.	"Babylon Drifter" ("Pusher" mix)	4:16
7.	"Martini Built for 2" ("Daddy O" mix)	4:28
8.	"Dimentia 66" ("Cherry's" mix)	3:27
9.	"Wasted Time" ("Lap Dance" mix)	3:53
10.	"Doris Love Club" ("Lizard" mix)	4:01
11.	"Hungry Venus" ("BlueBoy" mix)	2:40
12.	"Sexplosion!" ("Orgazm" mix)	4:05
13.	"Naked in the Grass" ("Scorpio's" mix)	3:18
14.	"Golden Strip" ("Bomb Gang Girlz" mix)	3:21
15.	"Starlet Street" ("JJ's" mix)	2:35
16.	"International Sin Set" ("Rhonda Bond" mix)	4:14
17.	"Dirty Little Secrets" ("Kiss the Boys" mix)	4:11
18.	"Hard, Fast & Beautiful" ("Club Ex" mix)	6:48
Total length:		70:03

== Personnel ==
- Buzz McCoy
- Groovie Mann
- Lydia Lunch

== Notes ==
Tracks 1, 6, 8, 10, 14, 16, and 17 are new mixes of previously released songs, while tracks 2, 3, 4, 5, 11, 13, 15, and 18 are songs that had never been released in any version before this compilation.

Track 7 was originally released as "A Martini Built for 2 (Daddy-O Mix)" on the 1991 promotional single "The International Sin Set" released on Interscope Records. Track 9 was originally released as "Wasted Time" on the soundtrack to the 1995 film Showgirls. The "Lap Dance" remix is identical to the original release. Track 12 was originally released on the 1991 single Sexplosion! released on Wax Trax! Records.

== Reception ==
The website industrialreviews.ru gave the release a rating of 2 out of 5 stars, writing, "The album's subtitle, 'Music To Strip By,' is quite appropriate—all these mid-tempo tunes are perfect for leisurely pleasures or the appropriate clubs with pole dancing. At home, though, they were perfect for washing dishes, tidying up scattered papers, and dreaming of summer and the beach, after which you could forget about it."
