= Allen Clapp =

American musician

Allen Gordon Clapp (born August 5, 1967) is the singer, guitarist and principal songwriter for the California rock band The Orange Peels. Since 1990, he has also periodically released material under his own name and under the moniker "Allen Clapp and his Orchestra".

== History ==
=== Foster City and garage bands ===
Clapp was raised two blocks from the San Francisco bay in a Joseph Eichler-built home in Foster City, California, where his mother and big sister taught him piano as a young child. He also studied the violin until his teen years, when he joined like-minded musicians Dan Jewett, Larry Winther, Chris Boyke and Maz Kattuah for form a garage band alternately known as The Batmen and The Morsels.

The band disintegrated at the end of the 1980s, with Winther and Kattuah going on to form garage-rock band The Mummies, and Jewett leaving to form The Himalayans, a band which included a pre-Counting Crows Adam Duritz.

Clapp and Boyke split off to explore more esoteric, folky material in the duo The Goodfellows, who performed regularly around Berkeley (where Clapp had graduated in 1989 with a major in English Literature), and San Francisco. The two later added a bass player, Neal Trembath (Pullman), a drummer, Tom Freeman (The Muskrats), and harmonica player, Juliet Pries. With this lineup, they gigged around the San Francisco Bay Area as "Huck."

=== Early 4-track recordings ===
In the midst of playing in those bands, Clapp had begun recording pop songs under his own name using a Radio Shack tie-clip microphone, a Roland RE-201 Space Echo and his Tascam Porta One four-track cassette recorder. Despite primitive production values, Clapp's ear for melody and economical pop arrangements captured the interest of Kattuah, who started the Four Letter Words record label while he was in the Mummies. Four Letter Words issued Clapp's first release under his own name, a song called "Very Peculiar Feeling" on a split flexi-disc with Japanese pop band Bridge (1990).

He followed up with the one-sided 45 "A Change in the Weather". The single quickly sold out, and attracted interest from the Iowa City-based Bus Stop Label. In 1992, Clapp released "Mystery Lawn", a three-song EP on Bus Stop. Based on its success, Bus Stop owner Brian Kirk asked Clapp to release a full-length album—the label's first. In 1994, Clapp released One Hundred Percent Chance of Rain under the name Allen Clapp and his Orchestra (Bus Stop) on vinyl and CD.

Recorded in Redwood City on Clapp's four track with limited equipment, the album was praised as a lo-fi masterpiece. The album's second song, "Something Strange Happens", was considered a standout track, and has since appeared on various compilations and in two independent films.

=== With The Orange Peels ===
Soon after, Allen formed a band with his wife, Jill Pries, on bass, and his old former bandmates—Winther on drums and Kattuah on guitar. Minty Fresh signed the group, and after a lineup change (Winther moving to guitar, and Bob Vickers joining on drums) the band rechristened themselves The Orange Peels, who have continued to change lineups and gone on to record for SpinART and Parasol records.

One Hundred Percent Chance of Rain was reissued in 2000 by Bus Stop on CD and LP. Clapp released a second solo album in 2002, a soft-rock effort for March Records called Available Light. He returned to the Allen Clapp and his Orchestra moniker on his 2011 album Mixed Greens.

In 2009, in preparation for the release of the fan-funded "2020" by The Orange Peels, Clapp formed his own label imprint: Mystery Lawn Music. Soon after, he began releasing music by other artists in the San Francisco Bay Area, many of whom had recorded at Clapp's Sunnyvale studio. As of 2016, the label had a catalog of 20 releases and an artist roster of 18 associated acts.

=== In the Santa Cruz Mountains ===
After being hit by a drunk driver on the way to the last show on The Orange Peels' Sun Moon tour in late 2013, Clapp and Pries decided to move to the Santa Cruz Mountains. In spring of 2014, they bought a house on a mountain in the northern San Lorenzo Valley and moved Mystery Lawn Studio into the lower level. Now using the name Mystery Lawn Mountain, Clapp continued to record and produce albums for like-minded musicians in Boulder Creek, California.

Following a summer 2015 tour with Matthew Sweet, Clapp retreated to the studio to write and produce a six-song EP, "Six Seasons." Full of cosmic imagery and vintage synthesizers, the release would pre-figure a stylistic shift for The Orange Peels on their next two albums (Trespassing, 2018; and Celebrate the Moments of Your Life, 2021).

While in California, Clapp engineered and produced all recordings under his own name, as well as five out of eight albums by his band The Orange Peels. He has also worked as a recordist, producer and mix engineer with The Ocean Blue (Waterworks), the Santa Cruz collective The Incredible Vickers Brothers, Alison Faith Levy, The Corner Laughers, Oakland rockers Felsen (Blood Orange Moon), and two albums by Sacramento pop band Arts & Leisure.

=== In the Virgin Islands ===
In 2021, Clapp and Pries moved to St. John in the U.S. Virgin Islands to start a new chapter. During 2020, Clapp lost both of his parents within 6 months, only to face a month-long evacuation in the CZU Lightning Complex fires. Relocating to Coral Bay, St. John, he built a new studio — Coral Star — as a workshop for new Orange Peels and solo material.

By 2022, word had gotten out around the island and Clapp began producing local artists, including jam-band Mother Goat USVI, country-rock artist Moss Henry, bar-band The Housewives of St. John, and Terre Roche, founding member of The Roches, who recorded her 2024 album "Inner Adult" in a single afternoon with Clapp engineering.

By 2024, Clapp's St. John-based productions and collaborations spanned 20 different artists, and he began thinking about launching a new record label to support the eclectic island scene. Early that year, he and Jared Warren (Mother Goat, Wonderlost) connected to co-produce the local steelpan band Love City Pan Dragons. When it came time to release the album for the Pan Dragons' Christmas concert series, Clapp and Warren decided to form a record label.

Good Duck records was launched in December 2024, and has since released music by the Love City Pan Dragons, Wonderlost, Moss Henry, The Addis Revolution, Elena Serene, as well as St. John Electric — a new band formed by Clapp and Pries with friends Jeremy Newman and Tyler Perrino.

== Discography ==
Very Peculiar Feeling, 1990 (Four Letter Words, flexi)

A Change in the Weather, 1991 (Four Letter Words, 7" 45 rpm single)

Mystery Lawn, 1992 (The Bus Stop Label, 7" 45 rpm EP)

One Hundred Percent Chance of Rain, 1994 (The Bus Stop Label, LP, CD)

Brown Formica Table, 1995 (Elefant Records)

Whenever We're Together, 2002 (The Bus Stop Label, CD EP)

Available Light, 2002 (March Records, CD)

Something Strange Happens: Four Track Forecasts by Allen Clapp (1990–2000), 2006 (The Bus Stop Label, Digipak CD)

Mixed Greens, (Minty Fresh digital release December, 2011; Minty Fresh-Mystery Lawn vinyl and CD release, May 2012)

Six Seasons, (Minty Fresh and Mystery Lawn Music, November 11, 2016)
