= Calling Dr. Luv =

Studio album by The Electric Hellfire Club
- Released: September 3, 1996
- Label: Cleopatra
- Producer: Paul Kneevers; Thomas Thorn

The Electric Hellfire Club chronology
Kiss the Goat (1995)	Calling Dr. Luv (1996)

Professional ratings
Review scores
Source	Rating
AllMusic	2.5/5 stars

Calling Dr. Luv is the third studio album by American industrial band The Electric Hellfire Club, released on September 3, 1996, by Cleopatra Records. The album is named after the Kiss song "Calling Dr. Love" and after their keyboardist The Rev. Dr. Luv who had recently died, which the album was dedicated to.

== Track listing ==
Calling Dr. Luv track listing
No.	Title	Length
1.	"Funeral Procession"	1:57
2.	"Book of Lies"	3:15
3.	"Hellflower"	6:20
4.	"Prince of Darkness"	2:38
5.	"He Who Holds the Lightning Rod"	5:00
6.	"Circuit Breaker"	5:14
7.	"Very Groovy Boots"	4:12
8.	"Servants of Evol"	6:17
9.	"Ultraviolence"	3:49
10.	"Pack 44"	5:06
11.	"Unleash the Beast"	7:42
12.	"Calling Dr. Love (Kiss cover)" (actually only 4:31 long, followed by silence until 5:01)	5:01
13.	"7th Angel"	2:14
