= Golden Pillz: The Luna Remixes =

Remix album by My Life with the Thrill Kill Kult
- Released: 2002
- Genre: Industrial
- Label: SleazeBox Records
- Producer: Buzz McCoy

My Life with the Thrill Kill Kult remix album chronology
Dirty Little Secrets: Music to Strip by... (1999)	Golden Pillz: The Luna Remixes (2002)	Diamonds & Daggerz (2004)

Golden Pillz: The Luna Remixes is a 2002 remix album by industrial music group My Life with the Thrill Kill Kult featuring remixes from the 2001 album The Reincarnation of Luna.

== Track listing ==
No.	Title	Length
1.	"Temptation Serenade (Smell The Heel)" (Remixed by Vermyn)	6:33
2.	"Asylum Disciple (Set It Free)" (Remixed by Jonathan Cox)	5:35
3.	"Radio Silicon (Silverado)" (Remixed by The Diamond Galaxy)	4:45
4.	"Hour of Zero (Don't Mess with Illinoize)" (Remixed by TRS-80)	4:18
5.	"Girl Without a Planet (Zodiac Girl)" (Remixed by Kito)	5:34
6.	"Flesh Playhouse (1 on 1)" (Remixed by Jonathan Cox)	5:01
7.	"Temptation Serenade (Bombasic)" (Remixed by Francis A. Preve)	5:21
8.	"Radio Silicon (Consumed)" (Remixed by Julian Beeston)	4:58
9.	"Asylum Disciple (.38)" (Remixed by The Baldwin Brothers)	5:37
10.	"Flesh Playhouse (Give Us Flesh)" (Remixed by The Diamond Galaxy)	4:37
11.	"Jungle of Love (Juju)" (Remixed by Buzz McCoy)	4:31
12.	"Hour of Zero (On Fire)" (Remixed by Juttajaw)	5:11
13.	"The Untouchable Class (Megatroid)" (Remixed by Buzz McCoy)	4:29
14.	"Flesh Playhouse (Eat You Up" (Remixed by Bill Van Ryn)	5:35

== Release ==
The CD was released in 2002 by Sleazebox Records.

== Reception ==
The music review magazine Sonic Seducer wrote, "In terms of sound, the album is fodder for progressive clubs, although the Eat Static mix could also really shake up the dark clubs. For a rather random compilation, however, 'Golden Pillz' is remarkably easy to listen to in one go, and in the meantime the record manages to create the atmosphere of a loud summer night full moon party in no time at all, even on cold, gray Sunday afternoons."

The review website industrialreviews.ru gave the album two out of five stars, writing, "Well, it's quite possible that the disk will be something to like, because there are some quite good things in it, and some of it is even quite suitable as a dance floor soundtrack."
