= Kooler Than Jesus =

Compilation album by My Life with the Thrill Kill Kult
- Released: 24 May 1990
- Recorded: 1987–1989
- Genre: Industrial dance
- Label: Wax Trax!
- Producer: Buzz McCoy

Kooler Than Jesus is a compilation released by electronic industrial rock band My Life with the Thrill Kill Kult in 1990. It contains the original "Kooler Than Jesus" 12" single along with two other previously released 12" singles, "My Life with the Thrill Kill Kult" and "Some Have to Dance... Some Have to Kill".

== Content ==
The lead track, "Kooler Than Jesus", was later remixed in 1990 for the band's second album Confessions of a Knife.... In 1994, "Nervous Xians" was heavily reworked and then retitled to "After the Flesh" for the soundtrack to the film The Crow, and the band also performed the song during the film itself. All of the tracks on Kooler Than Jesus was later included on the 2004 compilation My Life With the Thrill Kill Kult.

== Reception ==
Professional ratings
Review scores
Source	Rating
Allmusic	4/5 stars
Sputnik Music	4/5 stars

Kooler Than Jesus received positive reviews. Vincent Jeffries of AllMusic called it "one of the industrial genre's significant early-‘90s releases". Raul Stanciu of Sputnik Music called it "a huge achievement for the band".

== Track listing ==
No.	Title	Length
1.	"Kooler Than Jesus"	6:17
2.	"Devil Bunnies"	6:13
3.	"Nervous Xians"	9:49
4.	"The Devil Does Drugs"	7:03
5.	"First Cut"	5:04
6.	"Shock of Point 6"	5:09
7.	"Resisting the Spirit"	6:26
Total length:		46:01
