= Cerulean (The Ocean Blue album) =

Studio album by the Ocean Blue
- Released: 1991
- Genre: Alternative rock, pop
- Label: Sire
- Producer: Pat McCarthy, David Schelzel, Rob Minnig

The Ocean Blue chronology
The Ocean Blue (1989)	Cerulean (1991)	Beneath the Rhythm and Sound (1993)

Singles from Cerulean
- 1. "Ballerina Out of Control" Released: 1991; 2. "Cerulean" Released: 1991; 3. "Mercury" Released: 1992

Cerulean is the second album by the American band the Ocean Blue, released in 1991. They supported it by opening for the Psychedelic Furs on a North American tour. "Ballerina Out of Control" peaked at No. 3 on Billboard's Modern Rock Tracks chart.

== Production ==
The album was produced by Pat McCarthy and bandmembers David Schelzel and Rob Minnig. The Ocean Blue were more interested in producing an album that sounded of a piece rather than worrying about how well singles would do. The majority of the keyboard parts were played by Minnig. "The Planetarium Scene" alludes to a passage from the Book of Psalms. "Falling Through the Ice" is an instrumental.

== Critical reception ==
Professional ratings
Review scores
Source	Rating
AllMusic	3.5/5 stars
The Daily Illini	3/5 stars
The Macon Telegraph	1.5/4 stars
The Philadelphia Inquirer	2.5/4 stars
St. Petersburg Times	1/5 stars
Syracuse Herald-Journal	3/4 stars
York Daily Record	2/4 stars

The St. Petersburg Times opined, "Although it may be a botched attempt at moving in a more acoustic direction, Cerulean is a complete disaster, and unravels all the promise that the Ocean Blue originally showed." The Washington Post noted that "the quartet's cocktail-lounge rhythms and its interest in colors, flowers and mutability ... suggest a strong kinship with its trans-Atlantic peers... Like the products of most of those bands, Cerulean is pleasant but a bit too wispy for its own good." Dave Eggers, in The Daily Illini, said that the lyrics "are delicate, poetic and small-scaled." The York Daily Record concluded that, "as with a lot of alternative bands these days ... the Ocean Blue [have] tapped the sound of alternative rock without tapping any of the depth or sense of experimentation that made this music just that—an alternative." The Morning Call listed Cerulean as one of the worst albums of 1991.

In 1999, the Portland Press Herald included the album on its list of the 90 "best CDs of the '90s that no one heard". In 2024, the Star Tribune noted that the music "fell in with the more mopey, lusher, prettier brand of pre-Nirvana alternative rock led by groups like the Cure, New Order, the Church and fellow Sire label mates Echo & the Bunnymen."

== Track listing ==
No.	Title	Length
1.	"Breezing Up"
2.	"Cerulean"
3.	"Marigold"
4.	"A Separate Reality"
5.	"Mercury"
6.	"Questions of Travel"
7.	"When Life Was Easy"
8.	"The Planetarium Scene"
9.	"Falling Through the Ice"
10.	"Ballerina Out of Control"
11.	"Hurricane Amore"
12.	"I've Sung One Too Many Songs for a Crowd That Didn't Want to Hear"
