= Beneath the Rhythm and Sound =

Studio album by the Ocean Blue
- Released: 1993
- Studio: Compass Point (Nassau)
- Genre: Alternative rock
- Label: Sire/Reprise
- Producer: The Ocean Blue, Kevin Moloney

The Ocean Blue chronology
Cerulean (1991)	Beneath the Rhythm and Sound (1993)	Peace and Light EP (1994)

Singles from Beneath the Rhythm and Sound
- 1. "Sublime" Released: 1993

Beneath the Rhythm and Sound is an album by the American band the Ocean Blue, released in 1993.

The first single, "Sublime", peaked at No. 3 on Billboard's Modern Rock Tracks chart. The band supported the album by touring with Suddenly, Tammy!

== Production ==
The album was recorded in Nassau, Bahamas. The lyrics were written by lead singer David Schelzel, who wanted to return to the song-based writing of the first album, instead of concentrating mostly on the production.

== Critical reception ==
Professional ratings
Review scores
Source	Rating
AllMusic	4/5 stars
Chicago Tribune	3/4 stars
The Philadelphia Inquirer	1.5/4 stars
The Record	2.5/4 stars
The Tampa Tribune	3/4 stars

Trouser Press thought that "the self-produced Beneath the Rhythm and Sound lacks the outside opinion it clearly needed; a more seasoned set of hands could've brought 'Sublime' (which pleads for multi-tracked backing vocals) and 'Either/Or' ... to much fuller fruition." The Washington Post determined that "this Anglophile Pennsylvania quartet cultivates a generalized mid-'80s British guitar-band sound on upbeat tunes like 'Peace of Mind' and 'Sublime', but when the pace slips toward the sauntering the debt to Morrissey and Marr becomes formidable." The Columbus Dispatch called Beneath the Rhythm and Sound "a lush, jangly, alluring collection of rock songs."

The St. Petersburg Times praised "Dave Lau's light sax on 'Bliss is Unaware'." The Philadelphia Inquirer opined that "you'd be hard-pressed to find a record more bland and blanched than the third release from the Ocean Blue... Choosing to set sail on a listless sea of English pop styles, David Schelzel affects the adenoidal mannerisms of New Order's Bernard Sumner, Haircut 100's Nick Heyward, and a host of Postard-label Scottish acts." The Chicago Tribune stated that the band "rings in a subtle alternative rock sound with swirling keyboards." The Record commended "the guitar and keyboard interplay that adds tension to 'Don't Believe Everything You Hear'."

AllMusic wrote: "Leaving behind the mellow minimalism of their first two records, the Pennsylvanians gave their ethereal music a brighter, glossier sheen on this record."

== Track listing ==
All tracks are written by David Schelzel.

No.	Title	Length
1.	"Peace of Mind"	2:59
2.	"Sublime"	3:08
3.	"Listen, It's Gone"	3:46
4.	"Either/Or"	3:43
5.	"Bliss Is Unaware"	2:24
6.	"Ice Skating at Night"	3:18
7.	"Don't Believe Everything You Hear"	3:47
8.	"Crash"	3:28
9.	"Cathedral Bells"	3:19
10.	"The Relatives"	2:58
11.	"Emotions Ring"	4:06

== Personnel ==
The Ocean Blue

- David Schelzel – vocals, guitar
- Rob Minnig – drums, keyboards, backing vocals
- Bobby Mittan – bass guitar
- Steve Lau – keyboards, saxophone, backing vocals

Technical

- The Ocean Blue – producers (track 6), co-producers (tracks 1–5, 7–11)
- Kevin Moloney – co-producer (tracks 1–5, 7–11)
- Rob Minnig – engineer (track 6), mixing (tracks 6, 10–11)
- Michael Brauer – mixing (tracks 1–2, 8)
- Jay Healy – mixing (tracks 3–4, 8–9)
- Neil Davenport – photography
- Kim Champagne – art direction
- Scott Hull – mastering
