= Violence Is Golden =

Violence Is Golden may refer to:

- "Violence Is Golden", a song by John Fogerty from Eye of the Zombie
- Violence Is Golden, an album by Scanners
- Violence Is Golden, a book by Brett Halliday
- Violence Is Golden, a book by Stephen Marlowe
- "Where Violence Is Golden...", a song by the Electric Hellfire Club from Burn, Baby, Burn!
