= Burn, Baby, Burn! =

Studio album by The Electric Hellfire Club
- Released: October 25, 1993
- Genre: Industrial rock
- Length: 53:36
- Label: Cleopatra
- Producer: Brian Daly

The Electric Hellfire Club chronology
| Burn, Baby, Burn! (1993) | Satan's Little Helpers (1994) |

Professional ratings
Review scores
| Source | Rating |
|---|---|
| AllMusic | 4.5/5 stars |

Burn, Baby, Burn! is the debut album by American industrial rock band The Electric Hellfire Club. Released on October 25, 1993, by Cleopatra Records, following Thomas Thorn's departure from My Life with the Thrill Kill Kult, the album's lyrical theme ranges from satanism, drugs, sex, psychedelia to Ricky Kasso, the Son of Sam, and Charles Manson.

== Track listing ==
1. "Invocation / Age of Fire" - 07:50
2. "Psychedelic Sacrifice" - 05:33
3. "Fall From Grace" - 07:06
4. "Prodigal Son (A Libertine's Lament)" - 05:20
5. "Mr. 44" - 04:36
6. "Where Violence Is Golden..." - 06:09
7. "The Electric Hellfire Acid Test" - 05:38
8. "Epitaph" - 06:02
9. "Black Bus" - 05:22

== Personnel ==
- Thomas Thorn – vocals, programming
- Shane "Rev. Dr. Luv" Lassen – keyboards
- Sabrina Satana – dancer, backing vocals
- Ronny Valeo – guitars
- Richard Frost – drums

== Notes ==
The album's cover artwork was inspired by the church burnings in Norway during the early 90s.
