= The Orange Peels =

American band

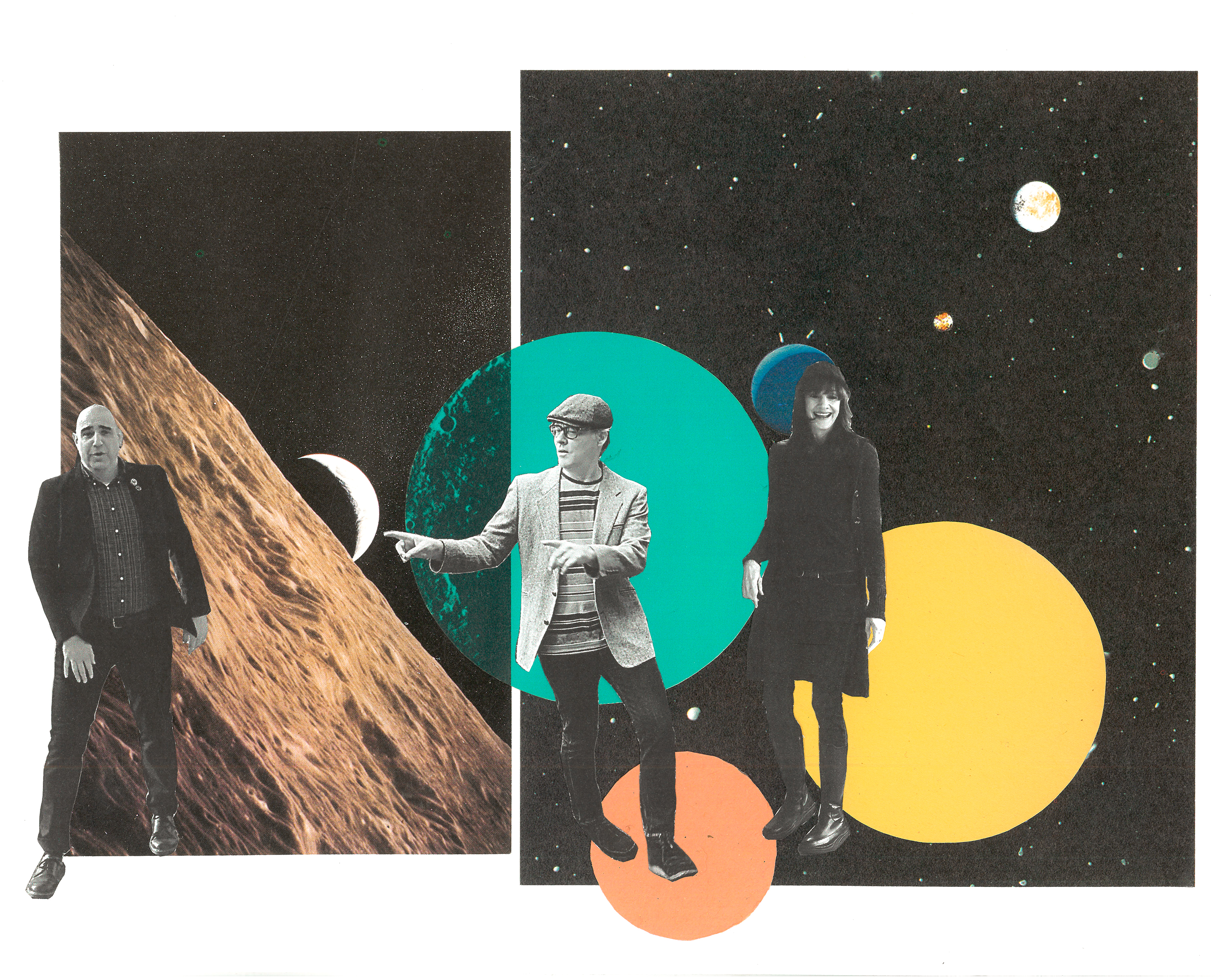
- Gabriel Coan, Allen Clapp, and Jill Pries

Background information
- Origin: Redwood City, California, United States
- Genres: Indie rock, pop rock, alternative country
- Years active: 1994–present
- Labels: Minty Fresh Records, spinART Records, Parasol Records
- Members: Allen Clapp; Jill Pries; Gabriel Coan
- Past members: Larry Winther; Maz Kattuah; Bob Vickers; John Moremen; Oed Ronne
- Website: www.theorangepeels.com

The Orange Peels is an American rock band influenced by the international indie-pop and indie-rock movements of the 1990s.

Over seven albums, has explored multiple genres including; psychedelia, orchestral pop, progressive rock, and electronic music. The band's music has been compared to artists as varied as Todd Rundgren, Prefab Sprout, The Posies, Big Star, Yes, and R.E.M.

The band's lineup has changed several times. Founding members Allen Clapp and Jill Pries have remained members throughout the band's history. Since the summer of 2019, the band has been a trio, made up of Clapp, Pries, and Gabriel Coan.

== History ==
=== Background, formation and Square (1994–1997) ===
The group originated as an offshoot of singer-songwriter Allen Clapp's fictitious band, "Allen Clapp and His Orchestra," which received recognition for Clapp's first album, "One Hundred Percent Chance of Rain" (The Bus Stop Label, 1994). Soon after the album's release, Clapp's high school friend Larry Winther reappeared after touring with garage-rock phenomenon The Mummies for four years. Clapp (guitar, vocals), Pries (bass), and Winther (drums) formed an energetic 3-piece in Redwood City, taking the fictional name from Clapp's first album. The orchestra played throughout the Bay Area and worked up new material for a second album, which they began recording at home on a four-track cassette recorder.

Soon after, music critic Jud Cost introduced Clapp to local producer Jeff Saltzman, who took on the task of engineering and producing the record in a double-wide mobile home in Campbell, California called Mysterious Cove Studios. Around this time, Maz Kattuah—Winther's bandmate from the Mummies—joined the orchestra on lead guitar. However, with the band's first recording session nearing, it was decided that Winther would be better on guitar, and Kattuah on the drums. The switch was made, but Kattuah soon left the group due to an increasing tour schedule with The Phantom Surfers.

A session drummer, Bob Vickers, was hired for the initial recording sessions (Saltzman and Vickers had recorded under the name Cerebral Corps. in the early 1990s). The Santa Cruz drummer was soon asked to join as a member in 1995. As sessions progressed, the band received offers from several labels to release the recordings. The group signed with Chicago-based Minty Fresh Records in late 1996, but the label wanted the band to finish the album with a different producer.

The band traveled to Minneapolis during the winter season to finalize the album under the supervision of producer-engineer Bryan Hanna. In the studio, they performed numerous tracks live, reinvigorating the group and creating a new identity separate from Allen Clapp and his Orchestra. Consequently, the group formally adopted the name "The Orange Peels" in the initial months of 1997, and their first album, Square, was launched in the late summer of the same year. The album received high critical praise and was nominated for two California Music Awards: Best Debut Album and Best Independent Album.

=== So Far (1998–2001) ===
After touring on its debut record was finished, Clapp built a modest home studio where the group embarked on the recording of its second album. Halfway through the sessions, Vickers left the group. San Francisco multi-instrumentalist John Moremen was asked to join, and the group continued playing live and recording until Winther left.

These sessions continued with the three remaining members until the rest of the album was completed. During this time, the band's headquarters moved from Redwood City to Sunnyvale, where Clapp and Pries had purchased an Eichler home. Just before the master tapes were due in Japan for release on Quattro Label, Winther and Vickers both returned, with Winther on lead guitar and Vickers on either lead guitar or electric piano. This lineup toured on the release of So Far (spinART Records) in the early months of 2001. A blitz of media coverage ensued, with television appearances, radio interviews, and shows. It culminated with the band being featured on the cover of the San Francisco Guardian.

Two songs, "So Far" and "The Pattern on the Wall" would go on to appear in the "Happy Birthday" episode of the television show Felicity, and the lead track, "Back in San Francisco" remains the band's most-downloaded song. Vickers again left soon after, reducing the band to its lineup in version 4 of the group. This version of the group did considerable touring and led to a more straight-ahead rock presentation, which would be reflected in the songs being written for their third album. Just as home sessions were progressing, the group disintegrated with Winther and Moremen leaving after a tour of the East Coast.

=== Circling the Sun and 2020 (2002–2009) ===
Having already written most of the third album, Clapp and Pries decided to record the album with Bryan Hanna in Minneapolis. Joining them were multi-instrumentalist Oed Ronne and drummer Peter Anderson, both from The Ocean Blue. Hanna also drummed on the sessions. Ronne and Anderson had played with Clapp and Pries in late fall in New York on a tour for Clapp's second solo album, Available Light. They met at the Terrarium over Christmas and New Years 2002–2003 to record most of Circling the Sun.

Overdubs and a few new songs were completed later that year at the Sunnyvale studio with Ronne and with Vickers returning as a guest musician. In 2005, Parasol Records released Circling the Sun and the band embarked on West Coast and Midwest tours. The band performed west coast shows with the B-52s, The Ocean Blue, Ivy, the Apples in stereo, and ABC during this period.

This version of the group wrapped production on its fourth album, 2020, in its Sunnyvale, California studio with guest appearances by Winther, Vickers, as well as John Moremen. In particular, the album's closing song, "Broken Wing," features as many as four lead guitar players, and the lead track, "We're Gonna Make It," features guitar melodies by Ronne and Winther. The album was released on November 10, 2009, on Minty Fresh, before the lineup changed again.

=== Sun Moon (2009–2013) ===
After 2020 was released, the lineup changed yet again, with Ronne bowing out. Rather than audition for a new lead guitarist, the Peels' long-time drummer, John Moremen, moved to lead guitar and the band began its search for a new drummer. Gabriel Coan was chosen after one audition, and the band went out over the next several months to tour the Northwest and Midwest on the material from 2020.

Amid the rehearsals, they also began recording new material, which eventually became the band's fifth album, Sun Moon (2013, Minty Fresh). The band had funded the vinyl pressing through a successful 2012 Kickstarter campaign. Having written and recorded the material together at the Sunnyvale Eichler in a collaborative atmosphere, the live set took on the sound and feel of the sessions. The band toured the East coast, the West coast and the Midwest.

=== Begin the Begone (2014–2015) ===
On the night of their last show on the Sun Moon tour, Jill and Allen were in a serious highway accident. Stopped in traffic, the two were hit by a drunk driver. Surviving the crash with no serious injuries, the two decided to fulfill a decade-long dream by relocating from Silicon Valley to the Santa Cruz Mountains. One last session was recorded at the Eichler, which spawned almost the entire song count for a new album.

After moving to a hexagonal house in Boulder Creek, California, in spring of 2014, the group reunited in the mountains to finish overdubs and mix the album. Begin the Begone continues in the compositional style of Sun Moon, where collaboration was key, but diverges in atmospherics, which play an important role in the sound of the album.

=== Trespassing (2015–2018) ===
As Begin the Begone began to attract attention, the group was added to Matthew Sweet's 2015 summer tour of the midwest. Sweet subsequently asked Moremen to play on the sessions for his new album, Tomorrow Forever (2017). Meanwhile, Coan relocated to Philadelphia to work at WHYY.

Clapp took the opportunity to record a solo EP, Six Seasons (2016). In winter 2016–17, the band began to gather demos and ideas for a new album. In March, 2017, they gathered at the new Boulder Creek headquarters with long-time collaborator, Bryan Hanna at the production helm. The sessions were a departure for the band: Two tracks were recorded outdoors in the redwoods ("Dawn Tree" and "Running Away"), while others featured new textures from vintage synthesizers (a Hammond Aurora, a Yamaha CS-50, and a Crumar Orchestrator feature prominently in "Heart Gets Broken by the Song" and "Stealing Days").

=== Celebrate the Moments of Your Life (2018–2021) ===
After the band parted ways with Moremen, the remaining members continued as a three-piece. They began work on a new album in the summer of 2019, but the COVID-19 pandemic interfered, and the trio found themselves isolated in the studio, and by the time the session wrapped, the band had composed an entire new album of material. All of the material was released on a double album with Bryan Hanna mixing, and Dave Gardner (Infrasonic Sound) mastering. Three singles were released: "Thank You" (2020), "Birds Are Louder" (2020), and "Give My Regards to Rufus (2021). Fans also funded a re-issue of the band's debut album, "Square" in 2019, which was pressed to vinyl for the first time, and included 2 CDs of outtakes, alternate mixes, and demos.

== Band members ==
=== Current members ===
- Allen Clapp – vocals, guitar, piano, synthesizers (1994–present)
- Jill Pries – bass guitar (1994–present)
- Gabriel Coan – drums, synthesizers (2010–present)

=== Former members ===
- Larry Winther – drums (1995), lead guitar (1995–2002)
- Maz Kattuah – drums (1995)
- Bob Vickers – drums, keyboards, guitar (1995–2009)
- Oed Ronne – lead guitar (2002–2009)
- John Moremen – drums (1999–2002), lead guitar (2009–2019)

== Discography ==
Studio albums
Year	Title	Record label	Notes
1997	Square	Minty Fresh Records	Produced by Bryan Hanna, Allen Clapp, and Jeff Saltzman
2001	So Far	spinART Records	Produced by Allen Clapp
2005	Circling the Sun	Parasol Records	Produced by Bryan Hanna and The Orange Peels
2009	2020	Minty Fresh Records	Produced by Allen Clapp
2013	Sun Moon	Mystery Lawn/Minty Fresh Records	This album was produced with money raised in 2012, on the crowdfunding website Kickstarter.
2015	Begin the Begone	Mystery Lawn/Minty Fresh Records	Produced by Allen Clapp and Gabriel Coan
2018	Trespassing	Mystery Lawn/Minty Fresh Records	Produced by Bryan Hanna, with Allen Clapp and Gabriel Coan
2020	Square³	Mystery Lawn/Minty Fresh Records	Remastered, expanded re-issue of Square issued on vinyl and double-CD
2021	Celebrate the Moments of Your Life	Minty Fresh Records	Double album released on vinyl and CD; Produced by Allen Clapp and Gabriel Coan, mixed by Bryan Hanna

=== Singles ===
- "A Girl for All Seasons" with "The Pattern on the Wall" (1999) The Bus Stop Label
- "Real You" (2010) Minty Fresh Records
- "Aether Tide" (2011) Minty Fresh Records
- "The Words Don't Work" (2013) Minty Fresh Records
- "Grey Holiday," with "The Old Laughing Lady (2013) Minty Fresh Records
- "9" (2014) Minty Fresh Records
- "Running Away" (2018) Minty Fresh Records
- "Stealing Days" (2018) Minty Fresh Records
- "Thank You" (2020) Minty Fresh Records
- "Birds Are Louder" (2020) Minty Fresh Records
- "Give My Regards to Rufus" (2021) Minty Fresh Records
