= The Ocean Blue (album) =

Studio album by the Ocean Blue
- Released: July 21, 1989
- Studio: Eden, London, England
- Genre: Alternative rock, indie pop, jangle pop, new wave
- Length: 45:47
- Label: Sire; Reprise
- Producer: Mark Opitz; John Porter

The Ocean Blue chronology
The Ocean Blue (1989)	Cerulean (1991)

Singles from The Ocean Blue
- 1. "Between Something and Nothing" Released: July 1989; 2. "Drifting, Falling" Released: 1990; 3. "Vanity Fair" Released: 1990

The Ocean Blue is the debut studio album by American indie pop band the Ocean Blue, released on July 21, 1989, by record labels Sire and Reprise.

== Composition ==
The song "Vanity Fair" references The Pilgrim's Progress.

== Reception ==
Professional ratings
Review scores
Source	Rating
AllMusic	4/5 stars
Magnet	favorable
Trouser Press	generally favorable

In a retrospective review for AllMusic, Nitsuh Abebe wrote, "While its songwriting occasionally falters, and it lacks the sonic cohesion of its two successors, The Ocean Blue delivers on what makes all of the band's work so appealing: simple, beautiful hooks and melodies."

The album peaked at No. 155 on the Billboard 200.

== Track listing ==
All lyrics are written by David Schelzel; all music is composed by David Schelzel and the Ocean Blue.

No.	Title	Length
1.	"Between Something and Nothing"	4:02
2.	"Vanity Fair"	4:38
3.	"Drifting, Falling"	3:54
4.	"The Circus Animals"	3:56
5.	"Frigid Winter Days"	3:21
6.	"Just Let Me Know"	3:29
7.	"Love Song"	3:22
8.	"Ask Me Jon"	3:12
9.	"Awaking to a Dream"	4:11
10.	"The Office of a Busy Man"	3:46
11.	"Myron"	3:29
12.	"A Familiar Face"	4:33
Total length:		45:47

== Personnel ==
The Ocean Blue

- David Schelzel – vocals, guitars
- Steve Lau – keyboards, saxophone, vocals
- Bobby Mittan – bass guitar
- Rob Minnig – drums

Production

- Mike Dignam – engineer
- Mark Opitz – mixing
- Bob Ludwig – mastering
