= The Ocean Blue =

American indie pop band

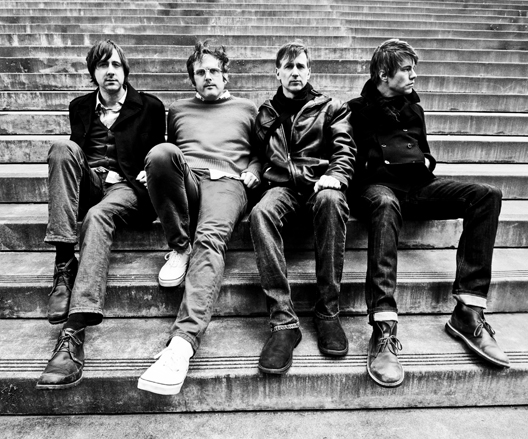

Background information
- Origin: Hershey, Pennsylvania, United States
- Genres: Indie pop; dream pop; jangle pop
- Years active: 1986–present
- Labels: Sire; Warner Bros.
- Members: David Schelzel; Oed Ronne; Bobby Mittan; Peter Anderson
- Past members: Steve Lau; Rob Minnig; Scott Stouffer
- Website: theoceanblue.com

The Ocean Blue is an American indie pop band formed in Hershey, Pennsylvania, in 1986. Its original members included David Schelzel on lead vocals/guitar, Steve Lau on keyboards/saxophone, Bobby Mittan on bass guitar and Rob Minnig on drums and vocals.

== Early career ==
The members of the Ocean Blue met in junior high school. They cut a series of demos while in high school, with Scott Stouffer sitting in on drums. They managed to get two of these earliest recordings, "On Growing Up" and "Wounds of a Friend", included on a local radio station compilation in late 1986. The compilation also included very early work from noted local artists the Innocence Mission, who were friends and mentors of the Ocean Blue. Rob Minnig would join as permanent drummer in 1987, and the classic line-up of Schelzel/Lau/Minnig/Mittan would continue through 1994.

== Sire Records years ==
The Ocean Blue's members were still in high school when they signed a three-album deal in 1988 with Sire Records, at the behest of Sire founder Seymour Stein. Their self-titled debut album was recorded in London with producers John Porter and Mark Opitz.

The band's busy calendar included U.S. touring and an appearance on one of the first episodes of Club MTV, with Downtown Julie Brown. The first single, "Between Something and Nothing", peaked at No. 2 on the Billboard Alternative Songs chart, while its follow-up, "Drifting, Falling", peaked at No. 10. Two videos were made for the songs and both received rotation on PostModern MTV. The band joined the Mighty Lemon Drops and John Wesley Harding on an extensive tour of the U.S. and Canada. All of this promotion helped the band sell well over 150,000 copies of the first record.

After recording in several New England studios with Pat McCarthy engineering and co-producing, the band released their second album, Cerulean, in 1991. The singles "Ballerina Out of Control" and "Mercury" both charted on the Billboard Alternative Songs chart, at Nos. 3 and 27, respectively. Drummer Rob Minnig began to hone his song production and mixing abilities, which would be reflected on the next album and its single B-sides, which the band chose to produce themselves.

The final Sire Records release came in 1993 with Beneath the Rhythm and Sound, which sold over 100,000 copies. The single "Sublime" peaked at No. 3 on the Billboard Alternative Songs chart.

The band contributed songs to the 1994 Martin Scorsese-produced film Naked in New York. For the duration of their 1993-1994 tour in support of Beneath the Rhythm and Sound, they toured as a five-piece group, with newly-added second guitarist Oed Ronne. Westwood One Radio Networks recorded the group's June 20, 1994, concert in Ventura, California and released it as a promotional-only CD, the band's only official live album.

In 1994, keyboardist/sax player and original member Steve Lau was becoming more interested in the music business and moved to New York City, where he founded Kinetic Records. His final appearance on a commercial release by the band came with the Peace and Light EP, featuring the album track "Peace of Mind", as well as two live performances and a previously unreleased track.

== Mercury Records and indie releases ==
In 1996, Mercury Records signed the band and released their fourth album, See the Ocean Blue, that fall, which saw the arrival of new guitarist Oed Ronne and the band's renewed interest in the music of the 1960s and 1970s. While Schelzel remained the predominant songwriter of the band, Ronne composed two tracks and sang lead on his song "Behind".

See was released to lukewarm results, with the record company cancelling plans to film a video for the second single, "Slide", although the band embarked upon a U.S. tour. In 1999, the band recorded and self-released their fifth album, Davy Jones' Locker. Two years later, the album was re-sequenced, re-mastered and re-released on March Records, with March releasing both "Denmark" and "Ayn" as EPs, each featuring three new B-sides. Shortly thereafter, drummer Minnig decided to leave the group after fourteen years, and Peter Anderson, a friend of the band from Minneapolis, was brought in for live shows and, eventually, permanent recording work.

In 2004, the band released the diverse six-song EP Waterworks on What Are Records?. That year, the group performed select dates around the U.S., recruiting the Owls' saxophonist Brian Tighe. The Orange Peels' Allen Clapp contributed music and production duties to the EP and, to reciprocate, Ronne and Anderson contributed to Allen Clapp and the Orange Peels' 2005 album Circling the Sun. In October of that year, Schelzel recorded a solo version of Adolphe Adam's 1847 Christmas classic "O Holy Night". This song was available only as a digital download via the band's website for the 2005 holiday season.

In late 2005, the Ocean Blue's entire five-studio-album catalogue, as well as the Waterworks EP and the band's first four videos, became available for purchase on iTunes.

On June 1, 2006, the Ocean Blue's Schelzel/Mittan/Ronne/Anderson line-up played its first-ever South American concert, with a show at Teatro Rajatabla El Llonja, Barranco-Lima, Peru.

In July 2010, the Ocean Blue's long-unreleased studio track "City Traffic" was uploaded to Dailymotion and YouTube, with an accompanying homemade video.

== Comeback ==
In December 2010, the band's website announced that a new record was in the works. The website also offered a free Christmas download of a newly recorded cover version of the ancient Basque carol "The Angel Gabriel from Heaven Came", performed by Schelzel and Don Peris (of the Innocence Mission).

In December 2011, the band's website announced that another free Christmas download—performed again by Schelzel and Peris—was available via the band's Facebook page. The release was a cover version of "Walking in the Air", a song written by Howard Blake and first showcased in the 1982 animated film The Snowman, adapted from Raymond Briggs' noted 1978 children's novel of the same name.

On January 12, 2013, the band performed their first concert since 2006 at the Korda Records Showcase in Minneapolis, Minnesota. (Korda Records was a new independent label formed by several artists, including Schelzel.)

On March 6, 2013, the band released "Sad Night, Where Is the Morning?", the first single from their forthcoming album, to radio and in digital and physical formats. On March 19, the Ocean Blue's sixth album, Ultramarine, was released on Korda. The band embarked upon a tour of key markets in the U.S., followed by dates in Paraguay and Peru.

On September 9, 2014, the band reissued their 2004 Waterworks EP as a full-length album, expanded with the addition of three extra tracks. The band supported the release with a six-date US tour.

In 2015, the band worked with Sire and Rhino Records to reissue their first three Sire albums on vinyl. The band marked the occasion by performing the first two albums in their entirety at limited concerts throughout the U.S. Also that year, Rhino made "City Traffic" available for digital download on iTunes. The following year, the band embarked upon a full South American tour.

In June 2019, the band released their eighth full-length album, Kings and Queens / Knaves and Thieves, on Korda. They also released a video for the song "Therein Lies the Problem with My Life". A concert tour was planned for late 2021, postponed from 2020 due to the global COVID-19 pandemic.

== Personnel ==
- David Schelzel – lead vocals, guitar (1986–present)
- Bobby Mittan – bass guitar (1986–present)
- Oed Ronne – guitar, keyboards, vocals (1993–present)
- Peter Anderson – drums (2000–present)

Past members

- Rob Minnig – drums, keyboards, vocals (1986–2001)
- Steve Lau – keyboards, saxophone, vocals (1986–1994)
- Scott Stouffer – drums (1986)

== Discography ==
=== Studio albums ===
Year	Album details	Peak chart positions		Sales
Year	Album details	US	US Heat	Sales
1989	The Ocean Blue: Label: Sire Records	155	—	150,000
1991	Cerulean: Label: Sire Records	—	23	175,000
1993	Beneath the Rhythm and Sound: Label: Sire Records	—	10	100,000
1996	See the Ocean Blue: Label: Polygram	—	—	
1999	Davy Jones' Locker: Label: March Records	—	—	
2013	Ultramarine: Label: Korda Records			
2014	Waterworks (Expanded LP Version): Label: Korda Records			
2019	Kings and Queens / Knaves and Thieves: Label: Korda Records			

=== Singles ===
Year	Single	Peak chart positions		Album
Year	Single	US Bub.	US Alt.	Album
1989	"Between Something and Nothing"	-	2	The Ocean Blue
1990	"Vanity Fair"	-	-	The Ocean Blue
1990	"Drifting Falling"	-	10	The Ocean Blue
1991	"Ballerina Out of Control"	-	3	Cerulean
1991	"Cerulean"	-	16	Cerulean
1992	"Mercury"	-	27	Cerulean
1993	"Sublime"	121	3	Beneath the Rhythm and Sound
1993	"Don't Believe Everything You Hear"	-	-	Beneath the Rhythm and Sound
1994	"Peace of Mind"	-	-	Beneath the Rhythm and Sound
1996	"Whenever You're Around"	-	-	See
1997	"Slide"	-	-	See
2004	"Pedestrian"	-	-	Waterworks EP
2013	"Sad Night, Where Is the Morning?"	-	-	Ultramarine
2019	"Kings and Queens"	-	-	Kings and Queens / Knaves and Thieves

=== EPs ===
1. Peace & Light (1994)
2. Denmark (2000)
3. Ayn (2001)
4. Waterworks (2004)

=== Side projects, promo CDs and compilations ===
1. WJTL Radio Lancaster Preliminary Hearing compilation (1986)
2. Just Say Mao (1989)
3. The Laugh Tour EP (1990)
4. The Ocean Blue Westwood One Radio Networks-Live in Concert (June 20, 1994)
5. The Orange Peels Circling the Sun (2005)

=== Demos, B-sides, rarities and unreleased tracks ===
1. "On Growing Up" (1986 – Susquehanna Sound)
2. "Wounds of a Friend" (1986 – Susquehanna Sound)
3. "Between Something and Nothing" (1988 – Sire demo)
4. "Vanity Fair" (1988 – Sire demo)
5. "Drifting, Falling" (1988 – Sire demo)
6. "Ask Me Jon" (1988 – Sire demo)
7. "The Office of a Busy Man" (1988 – Sire demo)
8. "The Circus Animals" (1990 – PA Mix/demo Laugh Tour EP and B-side to "Drifting, Falling")
9. "Renaissance Man" (1990 – from Laugh Tour EP- 77's cover)
10. "There Is a Light That Never Goes Out" (1994 – Live from Peace and Light EP - Smiths cover)
11. "Don't Believe Everything You Hear" (1994 – Live from Peace and Light EP)
12. "Sea of Green" (1994 – from Peace and Light EP)
13. "City Traffic" (1993/1994 – unreleased from Naked in New York sessions, Dailymotion video-audio release in July 2010)
14. "Whenever You're Around" (single version) (1996)
15. "Walk Away" (2000 – from Denmark EP)
16. "Sweetheart, You're Surrounded" (2000 – from Denmark EP)
17. "Mood Swing" (2000 – from Denmark EP)
18. "Garden Song (Dawn at New Hope, PA version)" (2001 – from Ayn EP)
19. "Harlequin" (2001 – from Ayn EP)
20. "New Man from Chicago" (2001 – from Ayn EP)
21. "O Holy Night" (2005 – The Ocean Blue website download)
22. "The Angel Gabriel from Heaven Came" (2010 – David Schelzel and Don Peris/The Ocean Blue website download)
23. "Walking in the Air" (2011 – David Schelzel and Don Peris/The Ocean Blue Facebook website download)
24. "Bleary Eyed" (2013 – B-side to "Sad Night, Where Is the Morning?")
25. "No Money in That" (2013 – from the Korda Records compilation Korda Komp 2)
26. "Big Ideas" (2016 – from the Korda Records compilation Korda Komp 3)
