= The Himalayans (American band) =

American rock band (1990–1991)

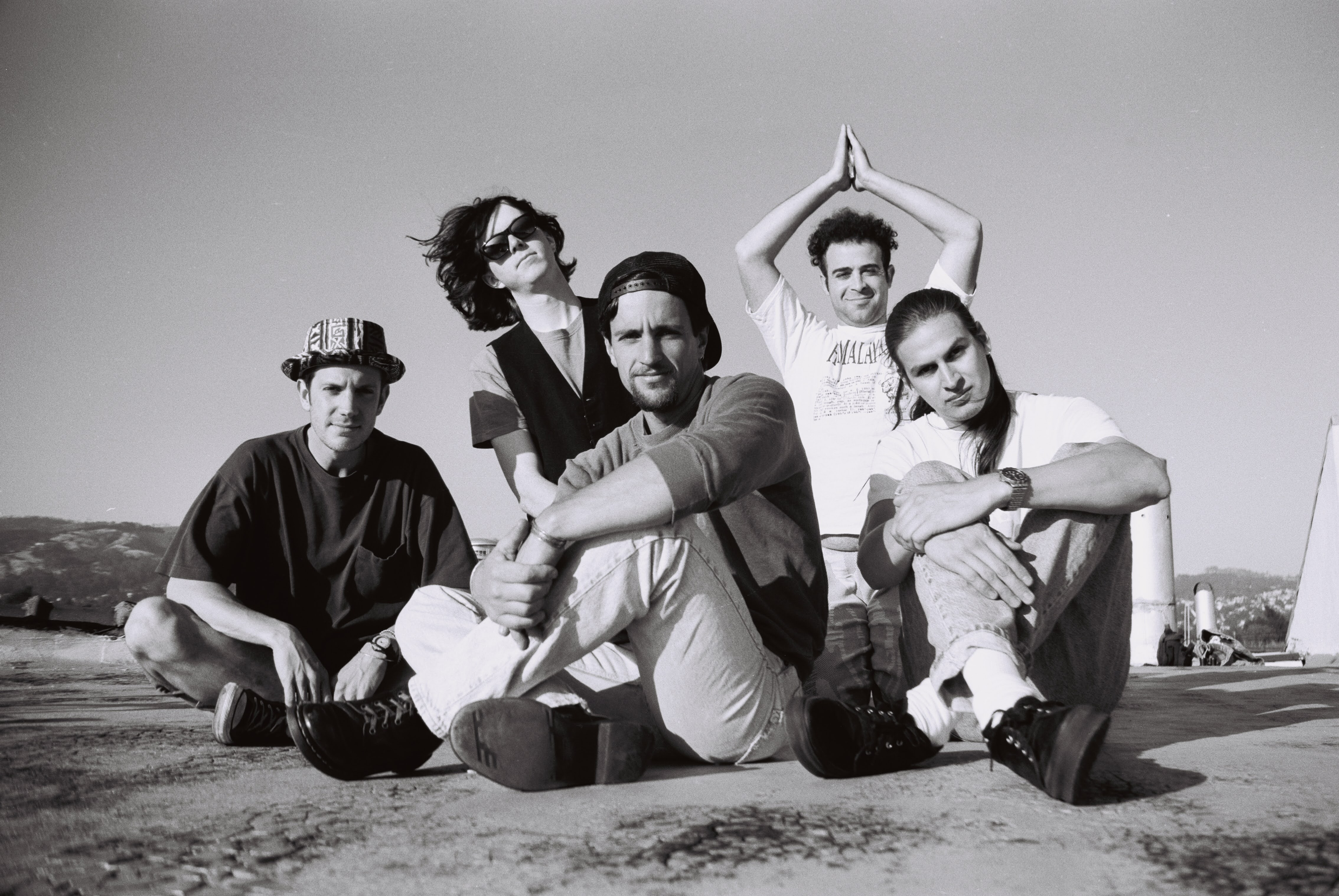
- The Himalayans 1991 lineup (left to right): Dave Janusko, Dan Jewett, Marty Jones, Adam Duritz, Chris Roldan

Background information
- Origin: San Francisco, California, United States
- Genres: Rock, alternative rock, pop rock, indie pop
- Years active: 1990–1991
- Label: Tyrannosaurus Records
- Past members: Adam Duritz; Dave Janusko; Dan Jewett; Marty Jones; Chris Roldan

The Himalayans were an American rock band active between 1989 and 1991. They are best known for starting the careers of two musicians, Adam Duritz of Counting Crows and Dave Janusko, a successful musician and songwriter.

== History ==
The Himalayans formed in 1990 consisting of members Adam Duritz (vocals), Dave Janusko (guitar, bass), Dan Jewett (guitar), Marty Jones (bass), Chris Roldan (drums). Duritz and Jones had previously worked together when they recorded on tracks that appeared on the Sordid Humor album Light Music for Dying People. The band recorded an album's worth of material, some of the tracks on that album were produced by future Counting Crows guitarist David Bryson. During this time Duritz and Bryson were performing as an acoustic duo at open mic nights and calling themselves Counting Crows prior to the formation of the full band.

Although the recorded album was never released while the Himalayans were an active band it was released in 2002 by Duritz's Tyrannosaurus Records label. A remastered version of the album was released in 2007. The album, She Likes the Weather, contains a mixture of original Himalayans songs recorded in the studio, snippets from radio interviews with the members and one live track. One of the original songs is an early version of "Round Here" which was made famous by Counting Crows on their debut release August and Everything After.

Following the band's breakup in 1991, Adam Duritz then formed Counting Crows with Himalayans producer David Bryson. Dave Janusko moved on, continuing his career as a musician and songwriter. He toured with My Life with the Thrill Kill Kult under the stage name Davey Dasher. Marty Jones was the main subject of the Counting Crows song "Mr. Jones."

In 2021 Adam Duritz spoke to Stereogum Magazine about his time in The Himalayans: “I was still in Counting Crows at the same time as this band—David Bryson and I were playing a lot of acoustic shows and open mics. But my main band was the Himalayans, along with Sordid Humor. I loved being in those two bands…The nice thing about the Himalayans is that it was very democratic between four people. I barely wrote any music in that band. I just wrote lyrics. It was a much wilder band in a lot of ways—loud guitars, very psychedelic. It was a lot of fun, I really enjoyed my time in that band… I would’ve been happy in that band forever, but I got back to wanting to write songs myself again. I started to have a vision for a kind of band I wanted to try, and when we got Counting Crows together, it worked really well. Once it was pretty clear that we were getting signed as Counting Crows, it wasn’t possible to do both anymore.”

In 2022, the band digitally remastered their catalog and released two albums and an EP to online streaming services. Russian Hill Sessions, recorded in one December 1991 session at Russian Hill Studios in San Francisco (previously released on CD as She Likes the Weather with snippets of KALX and KUSF radio interviews intercut between tracks), was digitally remastered for streaming platforms with an improved track order and the interviews removed. The album, recorded immediately after the band's last show at Berkeley Square, featured a new five-piece lineup with Marty “Mr. Jones” Jones replacing Dave Janusko on bass guitar—Janusko rounded out the band's sound by joining Dan Jewett on guitar. Dancing Dog Sessions, a three-song EP made by the original four-piece version of the band, was produced in March 1991 at Dancing Dog Studios in Emeryville, California, by Dave Bryson, guitarist for Counting Crows. It contains the group's original version of the song “Round Here,” which was covered by Counting Crows on their smash multiplatinum debut album August and Everything After.

Also in 2022, the group discovered a self-made 4-track cassette recording from the Himalayans’ early days. Recorded at the band's South of Market rehearsal space by Dave Janusko, this cassette features the original four-piece lineup and was remastered and released on streaming platforms as Harrison Street 4-Track Sessions.

== Members ==
- Adam Duritz – lead vocals
- Dave Janusko – guitar, bass
- Dan Jewett – guitar
- Marty Jones – bass
- Chris Roldan – drums
