= Satan's Little Helpers =

EP by The Electric Hellfire Club
- Released: October 4, 1994
- Length: 35:13
- Label: Cleopatra

The Electric Hellfire Club chronology
Burn, Baby, Burn! (1993)	Satan's Little Helpers (1994)	Kiss the Goat (1995)

Satan's Little Helpers is an EP by American industrial rock band The Electric Hellfire Club. Released in 1994, it features remixes of previously released material from their debut CD Burn, Baby, Burn!; Psychedelic Sacrifice, The Electric Hellfire Acid Test, Mr. 44 twice (Sam Speaks Mix and Sean Sellers mix) and a remix of a previously unreleased track Night of the Buck Knives. In addition the release featured two new original songs, the title track and an ambient instrumental track. Satan's Little Helpers features the band's trademark theme of Satanism, sex and drugs the lyrical concept also focuses on the crimes of infamous murderers, such as Charles Manson, David Berkowitz, Richard Ramirez, Jack the Ripper, and Sean Sellers. The EP like all other EHC releases features numerous samples from films, news reports and most notably David Berkowitz and Charles Manson.

== Track listing ==
1. "Psychedelic Sacrifice (Say You Love Satan mix)" - 05:32
2. "Satan's Little Helpers" - 05:38
3. "Mr. 44 (Sam Speaks mix)" - 04:39
4. "Baptized in Blood" - 03:03
5. "Mr. 44 (Sean Seller mix)" - 03:33
6. "Kali on Acid (Acid Test remix)" - 04:14
7. "Night of the Buck Knives (Altamont mix)" - 08:34

== Notes ==
The cover's artwork features depictions of serial killers, cult leaders and other infamous people; who have horns drawn on their heads, and various symbols drawn their foreheads. Some of the people on the cover include Sean Sellers, Richard Ramirez, and Ricky Kasso.
