= The Electric Hellfire Club =

American industrial rock band

- Origin: Kenosha, Wisconsin, U.S.
- Genres: Industrial rock, industrial metal, electro-industrial
- Years active: 1991–2002, 2016, 2025–present
- Label: Cleopatra Records
- Members: Thomas Thorn; Professor Cain; Doctor Scottario; Jericho Jovrax/J-44
- Past members: Ronny Valeo; Shane "Rev. Dr. Luv" Lassen; Eric Peterson; Richard Frost; Sabrina Satana; Ricktor Ravensbrück; Gregor Mephisto; Giddle "Go Go" Partridge; Wilhelm Curse; Vernon Vitn; James "The Butcher" Casper; DioBlo Ocho; Black Circle Chucky; Klem Kthulu; Dominic St. Charles
- Website: The Electric Hellfire Club on Facebook

The Electric Hellfire Club (EHC) is an American industrial rock band mixing elements of glam metal, techno, gothic rock, and psychedelia. The band's lyrics contain tongue-in-cheek references to sin, violence, sex, devil worship and similar themes. The band also made use of sampling, mainly from low-budget horror films.

== History ==
Based in Kenosha, Wisconsin, the Electric Hellfire Club was formed in 1991 when Thomas Thorn (a.k.a. Buck Ryder) departed the industrial/techno band My Life with the Thrill Kill Kult.

The Electric Hellfire Club was initially composed of Thorn (vocals, keyboard programming), co-founder and keyboardist Shane Lassen (a.k.a. Rev. Dr. Luv), and guitarist Ronny Valeo. After the initial string of live shows, drummer Eric Peterson (a.k.a. Janna Flail) was added to enhance the band's live shows, thus completing the band's original lineup. Prior to recording the first album, Burn, Baby, Burn!, dancer and back-up singer Sabrina Satana joined the group, and Peterson was replaced on drums by percussionist Richard Frost.

The EHC toured extensively throughout the early to mid-1990s, both as an opening act, and as headliners in their own right. They toured with Type O Negative, Christian Death, Spahn Ranch, Penal Colony, and Genitorturers, amongst others.

On January 22, 1996, Shane Lassen was killed in an automobile accident. After the death of The Rev. Dr. Luv, the band regrouped and recorded the album Calling Dr. Luv, dedicating the title track, a cover of the Kiss song from which Lassen drew his stage name, in his honor.

After recording Calling Dr. Luv, the band began extensive touring again, setting out on the road with Boyd Rice. During this period of near-constant touring, the band toured with such acts as Type O Negative, Danzig, Coal Chamber, Gwar, Powerman 5000, Fear Factory, Godflesh, and played one-off shows with Spahn Ranch, and Alien Sex Fiend. Before setting off on tour with Gwar in the summer of 1997, the band entered the studio and recorded the single "D.W.S.O.B.", which appeared on the soundtrack to the 1997 film Gummo. They also performed a cover tune for the television theme song "Charles in Charge" changing it and the inferred meaning with a goth and industrial style. The song was released on the two-CD set of 36 TV show opening tunes of TV cover songs done by gothic and industrial bands. The CD was titled TV Terror: Felching a Dead Horse, which was released in September 1997.

Following the completion of an extensive tour in 2002, the band entered a period of extended hiatus. A cover song of Metallica's "Devil's Dance", released through the band's website in early 2004, was a brief flurry before the band scattered in 2005. Front man Thomas Thorn relocated from the band's native Wisconsin to the Florida Keys, and Sabrina Satana relocated to Los Angeles. The official website went offline, and the official message board was taken down. In 2007, a new official website appeared, and the band's page on the website myspace.com began receiving updates. Information online indicated that the band was regrouping and possibly working together again, and that Wilhelm Curse had resumed keyboarding duties for the band. Throughout mid to late 2008, the band began releasing demo versions of previous songs, and other rare recordings via Myspace account. These tracks were available for streaming.

Early 2009 brought about the reactivation of the band in earnest. In January, it was reported on the official website and on the band's MySpace page that preliminary work had started on a new full-length album, which would mark the band's first studio album in seven years. It also saw Charles Edward from the Denver area gothic metal band Seraphim Shock join the band as guitarist, replacing long time band member Ricktor Ravensbrück, who was serving time in federal prison on drug charges. Original drummer Eric Peterson rejoined the band in February, reuniting half of the band's original lineup. In February 2011, a news update to the band's official site indicated that work on a new album was "indefinitely postponed". Subsequently, however, Frozen North Records announced via MK Ultra that Thorn, Ravensbrück and company had reunited and been signed to FNR in February 2014 to produce their first new album in over a decade, titled Tech Noir. The album reportedly would have paid tribute to not only the band's electro-industrial roots, but also maintain the heavy-hitting metal crunch they have been associated with more lately.

On November 2, 2016, Thomas Thorn announced via his Facebook page that The Electric Hellfire Club will never create new music again. The band marked its 25th anniversary with one final show in Tampa, Florida, at The Orpheum, on December 2, 2016.. On December 3, 2016, they played a private show at HOWL Gallery/Tattoo, in Fort Myers, Florida.

Thomas Thorn and an all new lineup of The Electric Hellfire Club played a one off show at The Orpheum in Tampa, Florida, on October 30, 2025. This was a celebration of the 30th Anniversary of their Kiss The Goat album.

On October 31, 2025, the band released a 7" vinyl limited to 200 copies. The A-side features a rerecording of Kiss The Goat, titled Kiss The Goat! (2025). The B-side features the song Beheaded by Burned At The Stake. It was self released.

Thomas Thorn said on Facebook that the band will start recording a new album in July 2026.

The band performed two live shows in 2026. They did a headline show at SancFest on June 6, 2026, in Milwaukee, Wisconsin, at Da Bar. They also did their own headline show in Chicago, Illinois, at LiveWire Lounge on June 7, 2026.

== Lineup ==
- Thomas Thorn – vocals, keyboards, samples, programming (1991–02, 2016, 2025–present)
- Jericho Jovrax/J-44 – drums (2025–present)
- Professor Cain – keyboards, electronic effects (2025–present)
- Doctor Scottario – guitars (2025–present)

== Past members ==
- Ronny Valeo – guitars (1991–93), (died 2024)
- Shane "Rev. Dr. Luv" Lassen – keyboards (1991–96), (died 1996)
- Eric Peterson – drums (1991–92, 1996–98, 2016)
- Richard Frost – drums (1992–96), keyboards (2016)
- Sabrina Satana – dancing, vocals (1993–96, 1996–99), bass, vocals (1999–02, 2026)
- Ricktor Ravensbrück – guitars (1993–94, 1996–02, 2016)
- Gregor Mephisto – guitars (1994–96)
- Giddle "Go Go" Partridge – keyboards, backing vocals (1996)
- Wilhelm Curse - keyboards (1997–98)
- Vernon Vitn – drums (1998–99)
- James "The Butcher" Casper – drums (1999)
- DioBlo Ocho – drums (1999–00)
- Black Circle Chucky – keyboards (1999–02)
- Klem Kthulu – drums (2001–02)
- Dominic St. Charles – bass (2016)

== Discography ==
- Burn, Baby, Burn! (1993), Cleopatra Records
- Satan's Little Helpers (1994), Cleopatra Records
- Kiss the Goat (1995), Cleopatra Records (reissued 2005)
- Trick or Treat? Halloween '95 (1995), Cleopatra Records (limited pressing of 1,000 LPs on orange vinyl, and 500 CD copies)
- Calling Dr. Luv (1996), Cleopatra Records
- Calling Dr. Luv (1996), Cleopatra Records (CD single)
- Unholy Roller – And An Eclectic Collection Of Remakes, Remixes, & Reruns (1998), Cleopatra Records
- Empathy For The Devil – A Collection of Creepy Covers and Holiday Hymns (2000), Cleopatra Records
- Witness The Millennium (2000), Cleopatra Records
- Electronomicon (2002), Cleopatra Records (reissued 2005)
- Necessary Evils – The Best Of The Electric Hellfire Club (2016), Cleopatra Records
- The Electric Hellfire Club – Kiss The Goat! (2025)/Burned At The Stake – Beheaded (2025), self released (7" vinyl, limited to 200 copies)
