= Diamonds & Daggerz =

Remix album by My Life with the Thrill Kill Kult
- Released: October 12, 2004
- Genre: Industrial, progressive house, disco
- Label: SleazeBox Records
- Producer: Buzz McCoy

My Life with the Thrill Kill Kult remix album chronology
Golden Pillz: The Luna Remixes (2002)	Diamonds & Daggerz (2004)	My Life Remixed: A Remix Tribute to My Life with the Thrill Kill Kult (2005)

Diamonds & Daggerz is a 2004 remix album by industrial music group My Life with the Thrill Kill Kult. It contains both new and classic songs extensively reworked and remixed into one continuous mix. Several of the tracks are mash-up remixes of multiple songs.

== Track listing ==
No.	Title	Length
1.	"Dream 101"	1:06
2.	"Devil Rider"	5:45
3.	"Hot Rod Boys"	5:56
4.	"Mz Disco"	5:29
5.	"Sex Whip"	5:20
6.	"Out 4 the Kill"	5:13
7.	"Mondo Fever"	5:24
8.	"Flesh Star"	5:55
9.	"Young Tongue"	7:45
10.	"Evil Lover"	5:54
11.	"Dope Kult"	8:25
12.	"The End"	1:42

== Personnel ==
- Engineer [Engineered by] – Skye d'Angelo
- Featuring [Directed by] – Groovie Mann
- Featuring [Starring] – Avaluciuos Whyte, Groovie Mann, Jacky Blacque, Jasmine Night, Kitty Killdare, Lois Blue, Lydia Lunch, Marcie, Rhonda Bond, Sekret DeZyre, Shawn Christopher, Sinderella Pussie, Viva Nova
- Mastered by – Collin Jordan
- Mixed by – Enzo X. Santiago
- Producer [Produced by] – Buzz McCoy
- Written by – Buzz McCoy

== Samples ==
The back cover of the album reads "* this album contains previously released Thrill Kill Kult samples". The following is a list of the samples:

- "Mz Disco" samples "Mindcage".
- "Out 4 the Kill" samples "A Continental Touch".
- "Mondo Fever" samples "Golden Strip", "Portrait of the Damned", and "The International Sin Set".
- "Flesh Star" samples "Disko Fleshpot" and "Starmartyr".
- "Young Tongue" samples "A Girl Doesn't Get Killed by a Make-Believe Lover... 'Cuz It's Hot", "Disko Fleshpot", "Flesh Playhouse", and "Kooler Than Jesus".
- "Evil Lover" samples "...And This Is What the Devil Does!", "Mystery Babylon", "Sexy Sucker", and "Universal Blackness".
- "Dope Kult" samples "...And This Is What the Devil Does!", "A Daisy Chain 4 Satan", "After the Flesh", "Easy Girl", "Ride the Mindway", and "The Days of Swine and Roses".
