= A Crime for All Seasons =

- Original Red Ant cover

Studio album by My Life with the Thrill Kill Kult
- Released: June 10, 1997
- Recorded: Starlust Studios (Los Angeles, California)
- Genre: Industrial dance
- Label: Red Ant Entertainment
- Producer: Buzz McCoy

My Life with the Thrill Kill Kult chronology
Hit & Run Holiday (1995)	A Crime for All Seasons (1997)	The Reincarnation of Luna (2001)

Professional ratings
Review scores
Source	Rating
AllMusic	3/5 stars

A Crime for All Seasons (June 10, 1997) is a studio album by industrial disco band My Life with the Thrill Kill Kult.

== Recording ==
A Crime for All Seasons was the band's first album for Red Ant Entertainment. It was recorded and mixed at Starlust Studios, Los Angeles.

== Release ==
A Crime for All Seasons was originally released by Red Ant Entertainment as a promotional cassette in 1996, followed by its official release on CD and cassette on June 10, 1997. It was later reissued on Rykodisc in 2000 with the additional remix "Sexy Sucker (Juicey Mix)".

== Touring ==
The band toured the U.S. in support of the album from June to July 1997. The live lineup of the A Crime 4 All Seasons Tour included Groovie Mann, Buzz McCoy, Levi Levi, James Fury, Davey Dasher, and Curse.

== Track listing ==
No.	Title	Length
1.	"Fangs of Love"	3:16
2.	"Dope Doll Jungle"	4:50
3.	"Sexy Sucker"	4:35
4.	"Blondes with Lobotomy Eyes"	3:03
5.	"Lucifer's Flowers"	3:59
6.	"Yesterday's Void"	4:00
7.	"Feel the Bite"	4:12
8.	"The Twilight Web"	4:50
9.	"Mr & Mrs Bottomless Pit"	4:05
10.	"Blue Moon"	2:12
11.	"Sexy Sucker (Juicey Mix)" (Rykodisc reissue only)	6:47

== Credits ==
- Design – McCoy, Mann
- Performer – The Bomb Gang Girlz, Thrill Kill Kult
- Producer – Buzz McCoy
- Remix – Buzz McCoy
- Written by – Thrill Kill Kult
