= Round Here =

1994 single by Counting Crows

Single by Counting Crows

from the album August and Everything After
- Released: May 23, 1994
- Length: 5:32
- Label: Geffen
- Songwriters: Steve Bowman; David Bryson; Adam Duritz; Charlie Gillingham; Matt Malley; Dave Janusko; Dan Jewett; Chris Roldan
- Producer: T-Bone Burnett

Counting Crows singles chronology
"Mr. Jones" (1993)	"Round Here" (1994)	"Einstein on the Beach (For an Eggman)" (1994)

Music video
- "Round Here" on YouTube

"Round Here" is a song by American rock band Counting Crows, released as the second single from their debut album, August and Everything After (1993), on May 23, 1994, by Geffen Records. The song's origins lie in the group the Himalayans, which featured singer Adam Duritz before he co-founded Counting Crows. Songwriting credits include Duritz along with members of both Counting Crows and the Himalayans.

Despite not charting on the US Billboard Hot 100 due to rules in place at the time, "Round Here" peaked at number 31 on the Billboard Hot 100 Airplay chart and number seven on the Modern Rock Tracks chart. The song also reached the top 20 in Canada and Iceland, peaking at number six in the former country and number 12 in the latter. The accompanying music video was directed by Mark Neale. In April 2022, American Songwriter ranked the song at number five on their list of "The Top 10 Counting Crows Songs".

== Song meaning ==
Duritz explained on VH1 Storytellers the meaning to the song:

The first way Counting Crows ever sounded, it was me and Dave in bars and coffee houses playing open mics, doing this song this way. The song begins with a guy walking out the front door of his house, and leaving behind this woman. But the more he begins to leave people behind in his life, the more he feels like he's leaving himself behind as well. The less and less substantial he feels like he's becoming to himself. And that's sorta what the song's about because he feels that even as he disappears from the lives of people, he's disappearing more and more from his own life. The chorus is, he sorta keeps screaming out these idioms these lessons that your mother might say to you when you were a kid, sorta child lessons ya know, "round here we always stand up straight", "carving out our names". Things that you are told when you are a kid that you do these things that.. that when you're grown up it'll add up to something, you'll have a job, you'll have a life. I think for me and the character of the song they don't add up to anything, it's just a bunch of crap kinda. Your life comes to you or doesn't come to you, but those things don't really mean anything. By the end of the song he's so dismayed by this that he's kinda screaming out that he can stay up as long as he wants and that no one makes him wait...the sort of things that are important if you are a kid. You know that you don't have to go to bed, you don't have to do anything. The sort of things that don't make any difference at all when you're an adult, they're nothing. And uh and uh this is a song about, about me.

In a concert in Amsterdam for "This Desert Life", on October 17, 1999, Duritz adds,

We wrote this song in 1989 ... We were all in bands and we had shitty jobs. We would wash dishes, work in record stores and wash windows and ... by day, so that we can be in a rock and roll band at night. You know? And it was after college and our friends are getting on with their lives. And they had good jobs, well... boring jobs... but they made more money than we did, and they had futures and we didn't. And there comes a point in the life of everyone in a rock and roll band that you have to sort of decide, am I going to do this with my life, or am I going to go get one of those other jobs? Because I can't deal with washing dishes anymore and I can't dig any more holes, and I can't wash another window. And there is those that go, and there is those that stay. And you walk out on the edge of the world and you balance yourself there for a while and you try to figure out just which one you're gonna be. And a lot of our friends are doing other things right now. And we're standing right up here on this stage.

== Composition ==
The Counting Crows version (the more well-known recording) is a slow and mellow folk rock song. The original by the Himalayans is done in a more "pure" rock style—somewhat harder and faster, with prominent electric guitar and bass parts. In a tradition that has manifested in several Counting Crows songs, the two versions of this song feature somewhat different lyrics. Various live recordings of the song also feature significantly altered lyrics.

== Critical reception ==
Upon the release of the single, Alan Jones from Music Week gave it a score of three out of five, writing, "A finely crafted rock ballad delivered in strong, melancholic style. While it is not really the stuff that daytime radio will embrace, the Crows' growing fanbase will embrace it, not least for the previously unreleased live track, 'The Ghost in You'."

== Music video ==
The music video for "Round Here", directed by British documentarian and film director Mark Neale and executive-produced by Debbie Samuelson, starts with some buildings collapsing and falling down, and it features Adam Duritz singing and walking alone over a railroad tracks. At the same time a man stands in the Dry Lake desert with clocks and watches, a woman (Bonnie Aarons) walks by the street carrying a sign saying "Nobody Move and Nobody Gets Hurt", and another woman (the Maria of the lyrics) walks with a suitcase by different locations of Los Angeles.

== Track listings ==
- UK CD single
1. "Round Here" (LP version) – 5:28
2. "Ghost Train" (LP version) – 4:01
3. "The Ghost in You" (live) – 3:30
- European and Australian CD single
1. "Round Here" (LP version) – 5:28
2. "Rain King" (live) – 5:12
3. "The Ghost in You" (live) – 3:30

== Charts ==
=== Weekly charts ===
Chart (1994)	Peak position
Australia (ARIA)	58
Canada Top Singles (RPM)	6
Iceland (Íslenski Listinn Topp 40)	12
UK Singles (Official Charts)	70
US Radio Songs (Billboard)	31
US Alternative Airplay (Billboard)	7
US Mainstream Rock (Billboard)	11
US Pop Airplay (Billboard)	10

=== Year-end charts ===
Chart (1994)	Position
Canada Top Singles (RPM)	57
Iceland (Íslenski Listinn Topp 40)	85
US Modern Rock Tracks (Billboard)	40

== Certifications ==
Region	Certification	Certified units/sales
New Zealand (RMNZ)	Gold	15,000^{‡}
^{‡} Sales+streaming figures based on certification alone.

== Release history ==
Region	Date	Format(s)	Label(s)	Ref.
Australia	May 23, 1994	CD; cassette	Geffen	
United Kingdom	June 20, 1994	7-inch vinyl; CD; cassette	Geffen	

== In popular culture ==
- Lyrics from the song are referenced by band the Gaslight Anthem in their song "High Lonesome" from the album The '59 Sound.
- Dustin Kensrue of the band Thrice has covered the song live.
- Kasey Chambers covered the song on her single "Nothing at All".
- Panic! at the Disco has covered this song live many times.
- David Ford occasionally plays this live.
- Josh Ramsay of the band Marianas Trench (band) has sampled this song live.
- Noah Gundersen released a live cover in 2024, describing it at the start of the recording as, "...the song that made me want to write music."
