= Death Threat (album) =

Studio album by My Life with the Thrill Kill Kult
- Released: April 20, 2009
- Recorded: Starlust Studios (Los Angeles, California)
- Genre: Industrial dance
- Producer: Buzz McCoy

My Life with the Thrill Kill Kult chronology
The Filthiest Show in Town (2007)	Death Threat (2009)	Spooky Tricks (2014)

Death Threat is a 2009 studio album by industrial disco band My Life with the Thrill Kill Kult.

== Release ==
Death Threat was released by the band's own SleazeBox Records label. In Italy, the album was released in digipack format by Rustblade.

== Touring ==
The band toured the U.S. in support of the album during May 2009. The live lineup of the Death Threat Tour included Groovie Mann, Buzz McCoy, Justin Thyme, Pepper Somerset, Stella Suicide, and Brett Piranha.

== Track listing ==
No.	Title	Length
1.	"Witchpunkrockstar"	6:20
2.	"Invasion (of the Ultra Modelz)"	4:56
3.	"Death Threat"	4:33
4.	"Spotlite Hooker"	3:49
5.	"Lone Road"	5:24
6.	"Who R U Now?"	3:58
7.	"Foxxxy Rockit"	4:36
8.	"The Ultimate Nude"	2:46
9.	"Bottoms Up"	4:36
10.	"Psychik Yoga"	7:02

== Credits ==
- Artwork – Buzz McCoy, Groovie Mann
- Directed By – Groovie Mann
- Drums – Adam Aaronson, Justin Bennett
- Producer – Buzz McCoy
- Sampler – Bill Van Ryn, Curse Mackey
- Vocals – Pepper Somerset, Rayzor, Wickedboy X
- Written-By – Buzz McCoy, Groovie Mann
