= Dave Janusko =

American musician (born 1965)

- Also known as: Davey Dasher
- Born: September 8, 1965 (age 60); United States
- Origin: San Francisco, California, U.S.
- Genres: Pop, electronic industrial, Breakbeat, Funk, Rock, Soul, Outlaw country, Honky-tonk
- Occupations: Songwriter, musician, producer, DJ, remixer
- Instruments: Guitar, bass guitar, synthesizer
- Years active: 1988–present
- Label: Tyrannosaurus Records

Dave Janusko (born September 8, 1965) is an American songwriter, musician, producer, DJ, and remixer. He lives in San Francisco, California, United States.

== Career ==
Janusko studied graphic design at Kent State University, then moved to New York City in 1988. Janusko and vocalist Tom Mullady teamed up to record music demos as emo / punk band The Medicine Men.

In the early 1990s, Janusko was a bass player and songwriter for the Bay Area pop band The Himalayans, which included members Adam Duritz (before the formation of Counting Crows), Dan Jewett, Chris Roldan, and Marty Jones. In the Himalayans, Dave co-wrote the song "Round Here," which was then re-recorded by Adam Duritz’s new band Counting Crows and became the second hit off their 1993 release August and Everything After. In 2007, Duritz's Tyrannosaurus Records released She Likes the Weather, the original recordings of The Himalayans, which had not been publicly available previously. This release included the original recording of "Round Here". "Round Here" earned Janusko a BMI Pop Music Award in 1996.

Janusko joined the electronic industrial band My Life with the Thrill Kill Kult (TKK) as the principal guitarist in 1997, using the stage name Davey Dasher. He toured internationally with TKK through 2004.

In 2000, Janusko collaborated with TKK drummer James Basore (a.k.a. James Fury) to create the live electronic band The Diamond Galaxy. Working with BZ Lewis and Studio 132, The Diamond Galaxy released their self-published debut, Technophiliacs, in 2001. The first song on Technophiliacs, “Another Day Until Tomorrow,” was featured in the Electronic Arts video game NHL 2001, and was awarded Best Industrial Song 2002 by the Just Plain Folks Music Organization. The song “It’s All a Game” was featured on MTV’s Making the Video: Dr. Dre; and “Alive and Dreaming” was featured on MTV’s Undressed.

Over the years, The Diamond Galaxy morphed into a live breakbeat band including members Meat Beat Manifesto drummer Lynn Farmer and Good Charlotte drummer Robin Eckman.

In 2004, Janusko and vocalist Krystle Jones teamed up to create the musical act Firefly, a blend of funk, rock, soul, and diva house. Former 4 Non Blondes drummer Dawn Richardson joined Firefly on stage for a couple of performances in San Francisco.

Janusko then played lead guitar in the San Francisco outlaw country / honky-tonk band The Plain High Drifters. The band includes members Smelley Kelley and Les James from Red Meat, bassist/vocalist Tom Armstrong, and banjo/guitar player Eric Embry of The Burning Embers.

Since early 2009, Janusko has been working with Meat Beat Manifesto front man Jack Dangers, contributing guitar and bass to new tracks and remixes. He collaborated with Dangers to create “In C – Extension,” a remix of Terry Riley’s avant-garde musical composition In C, for the album In C Remixed.

== Other work ==
In addition to his live and recorded music collaborations, Janusko has produced music for several TV and radio ads, including Toyota, AT&T, and 24-Hour Fitness. He has teamed up with film producer Drea Cooper to provide the soundtrack for online videos and public service announcements for the Pearson Foundation, the Milk-Bone Canine Assistants program, and the law firm Townsend & Townsend & Crew. In 2008, he wrote the soundtrack for the award-winning short film, The Trade, which was created as part of the 48 Hour Film Project in San Francisco.

== Equipment ==
Since 1998, Janusko has been endorsed by Washburn Guitars. He also plays an assortment of Fender, Gretsch, Gibson, and Music Man instruments, in addition to Nord synthesizers. For production and sequencing, Janusko uses Ableton Live and Propellerheads Reason software.

== Discography ==
=== Albums ===
The Diamond Galaxy – Technophiliacs (2001)
Firefly – The Big 8: Double Golden (2004)
The Himalayans – She Likes the Weather (re-release of 1991 recording) (Tyrannosaurus Records, 2007)

=== Remixes ===
"Radio Silicon: Silverado Remix," on Golden Pillz: The Luna Remixes by My Life with the Thrill Kill Kult (Underground Inc., 2002)
"Flesh Playhouse: Give Us Flesh Remix," on Golden Pills: The Luna Remixes by My Life with the Thrill Kill Kult (Underground Inc., 2002)
"In C – Extension," on In C Remixes by Terry Riley (Innova Records, 2009)

== Awards ==
2008 Silver ADDY Award
Toyota Belt Buckle Ad with Hoffman/Lewis
Regional/National TV, Single Spots, Consumer Products, Automotive

RIAA Platinum Record Award
August and Everything After - Counting Crows ("Round Here")
7,000,000 sales

RIAA Gold Record Award
Films About Ghosts - Counting Crows ("Round Here")
500,000 sales

Best Industrial Song 2002
The Diamond Galaxy: "Another Day Until Tomorrow"
(First Place)
Just Plain Folks Music Organization

Best Industrial Album 2002
The Diamond Galaxy: Technophiliacs
(fourth place)
Just Plain Folks Music Organization

BMI Pop Music Award 1995
"Round Here"
(Counting Crows)
