= 13 Above the Night =

- Original digipack cover

Studio album by My Life with the Thrill Kill Kult
- Released: September 7, 1993
- Recorded: Ground Control Studios (Los Angeles, California)
- Genre: Industrial dance
- Label: Interscope
- Producer: Buzz McCoy

My Life with the Thrill Kill Kult chronology
Sexplosion! (1991)	13 Above the Night (1993)	Hit & Run Holiday (1995)

Professional ratings
Review scores
Source	Rating
AllMusic	4/5 stars

13 Above the Night is the fourth studio album by industrial disco band My Life with the Thrill Kill Kult. It was originally released in 1993 on Interscope Records.

== Recording ==
13 Above the Night was the band's first album for Interscope and also their first album recorded with their touring band members Levi Levi (bass), Otto Matrix (drums), Trash Kavity (guitar) and "Chicago House Diva" singer Shawn Christopher. Lydia Lunch also co-wrote and contributed vocals to the song "Dirty Little Secrets". It was recorded at Ground Control Studios and Mixed at Starlust Studios, both in Los Angeles.

== Samples ==
On the track "Disko Fleshpot", the spoken words "Who do you think you're dealing with, some old slut on 42nd Street?" and "In case you didn't happen notice this, I'm one hell of a gorgeous chick!" are samples from the 1969 film Midnight Cowboy.

On the track "Starmartyr", the spoken words "How do you like the accommodations? Just fine, honey" were sampled from the 1976 horror film Squirm.

== Release ==
13 Above the Night was released on cassette and digipack CD on September 7, 1993. It was later reissued with two bonus remixes on Rykodisc in 1999.

== Touring ==
The band toured the U.S. in support of the album from October to December 1993. The support act on the 13 Above the Night Tour was Machines of Loving Grace.

== Track listing ==
No.	Title	Length
1.	"The Velvet Edge"	3:44
2.	"Delicate Terror"	5:37
3.	"Badlife"	4:16
4.	"Dirty Little Secrets" (written by Lydia Lunch)	3:40
5.	"China De Sade"	4:28
6.	"Dimentia 66"	4:23
7.	"Final Blindness"	4:43
8.	"Blue Buddha"	7:15
9.	"Starmartyr"	5:46
10.	"Electrical Soul Wish"	5:30
11.	"13 Above the Night"	3:42
12.	"Disko Fleshpot"	5:03
13.	"Savage Sexteen"	3:01
14.	"Blue Buddha (Master of the UltraFlesh Mix)" (reissue only)	6:11
15.	"Electrical Soul Wish (Miss Hate Mix)" (reissue only)	4:14

== Credits ==
- Artwork by – Kaptain Dave
- Co-producer – Fred
- Engineer – Eric Stitt Greedy, Jay Lean
- Executive Producer – Groovie Mann, Jacky Blacque
- Guitar – Bruce Manning, Luc van Acker
- Performer – The Bomb Gang Girlz, Buzz McCoy, Groovie Mann, Jacky Blacque, Kitty Killdare, Levi Levi, Otto, Trash K.
- Producer, Written-By – Buzz McCoy
- Sampler – Gro, Miss Stress Aviv Avon*
- Vocals – Lydia Lunch, Shawn Christopher
- Written by – Groovie Mann (tracks: 1 to 3, 5 to 13)
