= Spooky Tricks =

Studio album by My Life with the Thrill Kill Kult
- Released: May 6, 2014
- Recorded: Starlust Studios (Los Angeles, California)
- Genre: Industrial dance
- Producer: Buzz McCoy

My Life with the Thrill Kill Kult chronology
Death Threat (2009)	Spooky Tricks (2014)	In the House of Strange Affairs (2019)

Spooky Tricks is a 2014 studio album by industrial disco band My Life with the Thrill Kill Kult.

== Release ==
The album was released May 6, 2014, on Sleazebox Records (SLZ 015).

== Track listing ==
No.	Title	Length
1.	"Room on the Moon"	7:58
2.	"Spooky Tricks"	6:03
3.	"Hell Kat Klub"	5:02
4.	"Neon Diva"	4:11
5.	"The Way We Live Now"	5:05
6.	"Monti Karlo"	5:03
7.	"Bella Piranha"	5:41
8.	"Dope Freek"	5:55
9.	"Diamonde Doll"	3:57
10.	"Sex Witch"	6:13
11.	"The Strange Ones"	4:49
12.	"Room on the Moon [DJ Toxic Rainbow's Moon Shroom Mix]"	5:26

== Touring ==
The band toured for the album on the Spooky Tricks Tour from May 28 to July 2, 2014. This was followed by an old-school "INFERNO XPRESS style" tour with five dates in California from September 19 to November 16. In 2015 this was followed by the 2015 Summer Sizzler with six dates from June 26 to August 16 and then the Elektrik Messiah Tour 2015 from September 17 to November 17, 2015.

== Credits ==
- Artwork – Buzz McCoy, Groovie Mann
- Directed By – Groovie Mann
- Mastered By – Collin Jordan
- Performer – The Bomb Gang Girlz, Thrill Kill Kult
- Producer – Buzz McCoy
- Written-By – Buzz McCoy, Groovie Mann
