= Thomas Thorn =

American musician

Thomas Torquemada Thorn
- Also known as: Buck Ryder, Rev. Thomas Thorn
- Born: Thomas A. Lockyear, II; 2 August 1964 (age 61)
- Origin: Kenosha, Wisconsin, U.S.
- Genres: Rock; Metal; Industrial
- Occupation: Musician
- Instruments: Vocals, Keyboards, Sampling
- Years active: 1986-present
- Labels: Cleopatra Records, Wax Trax! Records
- Website: Electric Hellfire Club on Myspace

Thomas Torquemada Thorn (born Thomas A. Lockyear, II; 2 August 1964) is an American musician. Born in Madison, Wisconsin, he is best known as co-founder of, and lead vocalist for, the industrial metal band The Electric Hellfire Club.

During his youth, Thorn participated in several punk and post-punk bands (including the short-lived WestWorld), before founding the power electronics duo Slave State with Boris Dragos in 1987. Slave State played a handful of shows throughout the midwest along with staging a performance entitled "The Theory and Practice of Hell" in Antwerp, Belgium. While Slave State only released their music in cassette format, their influence was nonetheless far-reaching as they are cited by Godflesh founder Justin Broadrick as the inspiration for the title of his album bearing the group's name.

Re-locating to Chicago later that year, Thorn was approached and offered a position as live keyboardist for industrial dance pioneers My Life with the Thrill Kill Kult, which he accepted, under the pseudonym "Buck Ryder". Following Dragos' suicide in early 1989, Thorn signed on as a permanent member of the group. During his tenure with the band, Thorn (under his Buck Ryder guise) toured extensively with the band, and appeared in the music video for the song "Kooler Than Jesus". Thorn also claims to have contributed to both the "Confessions of a Knife" and "Sexplosion!" albums. Thorn chose to leave the group for undisclosed reasons prior to that album's release in 1991, instead relocating to Kenosha, WI where he founded The Electric Hellfire Club with Shane Lassen (Rev. Dr. Luv) and guitarist Ronny Valeo of Screamer. Thorn has also collaborated with bands such as Sleep Chamber, Chthonic Force, and Morphine Angel.

During a 1996 tour with Boyd Rice, Rice introduced Thorn to Church of Satan founder, Anton LaVey. During their meeting, he was ordained a priest in the church by LaVey. Thorn later wrote a eulogy of LaVey following the latter's death in 1997, which appeared in the Church of Satan's house organ The Black Flame.
