= I See Good Spirits and I See Bad Spirits =

Studio album by My Life with the Thrill Kill Kult
- Released: 1988
- Recorded: June 17–26, 1988
- Studios: Zas Productions, Bost, Belgium
- Genres: Industrial rock, industrial dance
- Length: 48:16 (1988); 61:14 (2004 reissue)
- Label: Wax Trax!
- Producer: My Life with the Thrill Kill Kult

My Life with the Thrill Kill Kult chronology
I See Good Spirits and I See Bad Spirits (1988)	Confessions of a Knife... (1990)

I See Good Spirits and I See Bad Spirits is the first studio album by the band My Life with the Thrill Kill Kult. It was released in 1988 via Wax Trax!

The band's sound was initially an amalgam of heavy dance rhythms, horror film sampling, and quasi-Satanic imagery. Their early recordings were extremely popular in industrial dance clubs. A music video was released for the song, "...And This is What the Devil Does!", and appears on The Kult Kollection DVD. In 2004, the album was remastered and reissued with three bonus tracks, featuring two live tracks recorded on October 28, 1988, at The Riviera, Chicago.

== Critical reception ==
Professional ratings
Review scores
Source	Rating
AllMusic	3/5 stars
Melody Maker	(favorable)
Sputnikmusic	3.5/5

Trouser Press wrote that "the dreary mix of electronic atmospherics, vaguely ominous chants, disco beats and B-movie samples aspires to sleaziness but never breaks (out in) a sweat."

== Track listing ==
All tracks composed by My Life with the Thrill Kill Kult and the Bomb Gang Girls

No.	Title	Length
1.	"Heresy"	4:01
2.	"X-Communication"	5:10
3.	"Do You Fear (For Your Child?)"	5:34
4.	"Easy Girl"	4:11
5.	"Universal Blackness"	7:08
6.	"...And This Is What the Devil Does!"	5:56
7.	"These Remains"	5:20
8.	"On This Rack"	4:38
9.	"Gateway to Hell"	4:26
10.	"Scene One, Seen 'Em All"	1:52
Total length:		48:16

2004 reissue bonus tracks
No.	Title	Length
11.	"Nervous Xians" (live)	4:15
12.	"X-Communication" (live)	4:56
13.	"Back from Beyond"	3:47
Total length:		61:14
