= The Filthiest Show in Town =

Studio album by My Life with the Thrill Kill Kult
- Released: 2007
- Recorded: Starlust Studios (Los Angeles, California)
- Genre: Industrial dance
- Label: Rykodisc
- Producer: Buzz McCoy

My Life with the Thrill Kill Kult chronology
Gay, Black and Married (2005)	The Filthiest Show in Town (2007)	Death Threat (2009)

Professional ratings
Review scores
Source	Rating
AllMusic	3.5/5 stars

The Filthiest Show in Town is a 2007 studio album by industrial disco band My Life with the Thrill Kill Kult.

== Recording ==
The Filthiest Show in Town was the band's second album recorded for Rykodisc. It was recorded and mixed at Starlust Studios, Los Angeles. It was mastered at The Boiler Room, Chicago.

== Release ==
The Filthiest Show in Town was released on CD by Rykodisc in the UK, US, and Europe in 2007.

== Touring ==
The band toured the U.S. in support of the album from November to December 2007. The live lineup of the Filthiest Show Tour included Groovie Mann, Buzz McCoy, Justin Thyme, Levi Levi, and Pepper Somerset.

== Track listing ==
No.	Title	Length
1.	"Cadillac Square"	5:48
2.	"Born of Fire"	4:32
3.	"Jet Set Sex"	8:15
4.	"High Class Taboo"	4:11
5.	"Me & Harlow"	5:33
6.	"Sophisticated Living"	5:57
7.	"TV Sista'"	5:50
8.	"My Kinda Guy"	5:22
9.	"Jive Ass Ave"	4:15
10.	"CoverGirl Blues"	6:50

== Credits ==
- Artwork – McCoy, Mann
- Directed By – Groovie Mann
- Mastered By – Collin Jordan
- Performer – The Bomb Gang Girlz, Thrill Kill Kult
- Producer – Buzz McCoy
- Written-By – Buzz McCoy, Groovie Mann
