= Sexplosion! =

Studio album by My Life with the Thrill Kill Kult
- Released: 1991
- Recorded: December 1990 – January 1991 (Chicago, Illinois)
- Genre: Industrial dance
- Labels: Wax Trax! Interscope/Atlantic
- Producer: Buzz McCoy

My Life with the Thrill Kill Kult chronology
Confessions of a Knife... (1990)	Sexplosion! (1991)	13 Above the Night (1993)

Sexplosion! is the third studio album by industrial disco band My Life with the Thrill Kill Kult. It was originally released in 1991 on Wax Trax! Records. Described by lead vocalist Groovie Mann as their "sexy" album, Sexplosion! is one of the band's biggest commercial and critical successes.

== Background ==
Vocalist Groovie Mann called Sexplosion! the group's "sexy" album in 1995, adding that it was "total disco". He said it was intended as an open-ended fantasy for listeners and that it was genderless in its suggestions.

== Release ==
Sexplosion! was released in 1991 on Wax Trax! Records and became one of the most successful releases in the label's history, selling more than 61,000 copies within six weeks of the album's June 1 release. The title track peaked at No. 10 on the Billboard Dance/Club Play Songs on October 26, 1991. The song "Sex on Wheelz" peaked at No. 15 on the same chart on July 27, 1991, as well as reaching No. 23 on the Modern Rock Tracks Chart. "Sex on Wheelz" appeared on the latter chart again, with its Cool World soundtrack remix, when it peaked at No. 17 on August 15, 1992.

== Reception ==
Professional ratings
Review scores
Source	Rating
AllMusic	4/5 stars
Chicago Tribune	3.5/4 stars

Sexplosion! was well received by critics. Ned Raggett of AllMusic said it was the band's best album, calling it a clever blend of pop music sensibilities and trashiness. He went on to say the album mostly concerned itself with "who is doing whom and whether or not there will be enough spangles, muscle boys, and cocktails available." He noted with approval its lounge music vibe in places, as well as its sampling of theme songs from James Bond movies including Thunderball. He particularly praised the album's hit single "Sex on Wheelz" for its "nutty stomp and leer" and called it "as compressed and propulsive a celebration of fornication and driving as anything else America has ever come up with." Greg Kot of the Chicago Tribune was similarly enthusiastic, and began his review by saying, "This record has absolutely no redeeming social value whatsoever, and it's wonderful." He went on to call the album a blend of "sleaze ... camp ... and neon stylishness", and said it is all about having adult fun.

== Touring ==
The band toured in support of the album in July 1991. Eric Brace of The Washington Post said the live show was quite strong considering how devoted to camp the band is. He noted Groovie Mann's vocals and the excessive use of smoke machines as the show's primary weak points, while praising the performances of the instrumentalists in the group.

== Track listing ==
All tracks are written by Buzz McCoy and Groovie Mann.

Original Wax Trax! release (1991)
No.	Title	Length
1.	"The International Sin Set"	5:48
2.	"Leathersex"	6:10
3.	"A Martini Built for Two"	5:48
4.	"Dream Baby"	5:47
5.	"Mood No. 6"	2:25
6.	"Sexplosion!"	5:52
7.	"Princess of the Queens (The Lost Generation)"	4:31
8.	"Sex on Wheelz"	4:59
9.	"A Continental Touch"	6:11
10.	"Mystery Babylon"	7:13
11.	"Dream Baby" (Nocturnal Mix)	7:04
12.	"Sex on Wheelz" (Radio Mix)	3:58

Interscope re-release (1992)
No.	Title	Length
1.	"The International Sin Set"	5:48
2.	"Leathersex"	6:10
3.	"A Martini Built for Two"	5:48
4.	"Dream Baby"	5:47
5.	"Mood No. 6"	2:25
6.	"Sexplosion!"	5:52
7.	"Princess of the Queens (The Lost Generation)"	4:31
8.	"Sex on Wheelz"	4:59
9.	"A Continental Touch"	6:11
10.	"Mystery Babylon"	7:13
11.	"Sex on Wheelz" (Motor City Remix)	4:40

== Personnel ==
- Groovie Mann – vocals
- Buzz McCoy – programming, guitar
- Sekret Dezyre (Laura Dame) – vocals
- Shawn Christopher – vocals (7)
