= Kiss the Goat (The Electric Hellfire Club album) =

Kiss The Goat

Studio album by The Electric Hellfire Club
- Released: April 8, 1995
- Genre: Industrial
- Length: 63:48
- Label: Cleopatra

The Electric Hellfire Club chronology
Satan's Little Helpers (1994)	Kiss The Goat (1995)	Trick or Treat (1995)

Professional ratings
Review scores
Source	Rating
AllMusic	3/5 stars

Kiss the Goat is the second studio album by American industrial rock band The Electric Hellfire Club. The musical styling is a departure from the first album (1993's Burn, Baby, BURN!), utilizing much less prominent guitars, and significantly different effects on the lead vocals. Musical themes and references include: Lust, the Kama Sutra, ultraviolence, Charles Manson, Richard Ramirez.

== Track listing ==
1. "Invitation to Your Damnation" - 02:08
2. "Hellfire!" - 04:04
3. "Dakshineswar / In the Temple of Flesh" - 06:36
4. "The Abattoir Eternal" (credited to Blood Axis) - 01:22
5. "Slaughter of Elysium" - 05:12
6. "Incubus" - 04:35
7. "Evil Genius (Queen of Sin)" - 06:47
8. "Love Is the Law" - 05:47
9. "Jack the Knife" - 07:25
10. "Bitchcraft" - 03:27
11. "Creepy Crawler" - 02:48
12. "Night of the Buck Knives (Coming Down Fast mix)" - 05:06
13. "Kiss the Goat" - 08:31
14. "Hellfire! (Cykophuk remix)" (bonus track on the Magick 2005 reissue)
15. "Root of All Evil (Bring Me the Head of Bob Larsen...)" (bonus track on the Magick 2005 reissue)

== Notes ==
- Dedicated to Anton LaVey's son, Satan Xerxes Carnacki LaVey.
- This was the last record to feature co-founder and keyboardist Shane "Rev. Dr. Luv" Lassen, who was killed in an automobile accident on January 22, 1996.
- Album was reissued through Magick in 2005 and features "Hellfire! (Cykophuk remix)" and "Root of All Evil (Bring Me the Head of Bob Larsen...)" as bonus tracks. Both songs first appeared on the 1998 release, "Unholy Roller, and an Eclectic Collection of Remakes, Remixes and Reruns."
- The reissue contained 34 total tracks; Tracks 16–33 each consist of 4 seconds of silence. Track 34 is "Charles in Charge", a cover of the theme song from the show of the same name, in which the lyrics have been changed to be about Charles Manson. The song was originally recorded for the TV Terror compilation.
