= Confessions of a Knife... =

Studio album by My Life with the Thrill Kill Kult
- Released: July 12, 1990
- Recorded: 1990
- Genre: Industrial rock
- Length: 1:00:32 (1990)
- Label: Wax Trax!

My Life with the Thrill Kill Kult chronology
I See Good Spirits and I See Bad Spirits (1988)	Confessions of a Knife... (1990)	Sexplosion! (1991)

Professional ratings
Review scores
Source	Rating
Select	3/5

Confessions of a Knife... is the second studio album by the industrial rock band My Life with the Thrill Kill Kult. The album was released in 1990 on CD, LP, and cassette by Wax Trax! Records. The 1990 CD release had one extra track, "Do You Fear (The Inferno Express?)". The album was reissued by Rykodisc in 2004 with three additional tracks.

== Track listing ==
No.	Title	Length
1.	"A Daisy Chain 4 Satan" (Acid & Flowerz Mix)	5:29
2.	"The Days of Swine & Roses"	6:01
3.	"Hand in Hand"	6:15
4.	"Waiting for Mommie"	5:23
5.	"Confessions of a Knife" (Theme Part 1)	2:59
6.	"Ride the Mindway"	7:11
7.	"Rivers of Blood, Years of Darkness"	6:12
8.	"Kooler Than Jesus" (Electrik Messiah Mix)	4:09
9.	"Burning Dirt"	5:02
10.	"Confessions of a Knife" (Theme Part 2)	3:42
11.	"Do You Fear (The Inferno Express?)" (Bonus Track)	4:32
Total length:		1:00:32

2004 reissue bonus tracks
No.	Title	Length
11.	"Waiting for Mommie" (JB's Blackjack Mix)	5:17
12.	"Ride the Mindway" (UK Remix)	4:25
13.	"Confessions of a Knife (Theme Part 3)"	5:07

The 2004 reissue omits bonus track #11 "Do You Fear (The Inferno Express?)" from the original 1990 release. It is replaced by "Waiting for Mommie (JB's Blackjack Mix)".

The song "Confessions of a Knife (Theme Part 2)" features multiple audio samples of dialogue from George A. Romero's Day of the Dead.

The song "A Daisy Chain 4 Satan (Acid & Flowerz Mix)" features multiple audio samples from a 1967 radio program entitled A Child, Again presented by the WNEW Radio News and Public Affairs Department, in which Steve Young interviewed a young woman named Marcy who described her life as a hippie.
