= Gay, Black and Married =

Studio album by My Life with the Thrill Kill Kult
- Released: 2005
- Recorded: Starlust Studios (Los Angeles, California)
- Genre: Industrial dance
- Label: SleazeBox Records
- Producer: Buzz McCoy

My Life with the Thrill Kill Kult chronology
The Reincarnation of Luna (2001)	Gay, Black and Married (2005)	The Filthiest Show in Town (2007)

Professional ratings
Review scores
Source	Rating
AllMusic	2.5/5 stars

Gay, Black and Married is a 2005 studio album by industrial disco band My Life with the Thrill Kill Kult. The band describes it as an homage to the 1970s disco era.

== Recording ==
The album was recorded at The Cave and mixed at Starlust Studios in Los Angeles. It was mastered at The Boiler Room in Chicago.

== Release ==
Gay, Black and Married was the first album to have its initial release on Rykodisc, the label that handles their reissues. It was released in the UK in a plastic sleeve with an insert.

== Track listing ==
No.	Title	Length
1.	"Do Ya Wanna Get Funky with Me"	4:23
2.	"Euro-Freak Hustle"	6:06
3.	"Freaky Fever"	7:42
4.	"One Nite Stand"	8:35
5.	"Magic Boy, Magic Girl"	5:35
6.	"Foreign World"	6:09
7.	"Paradise Motel"	7:01
8.	"Fhantasi Luv'r"	5:49
9.	"Sci-Fi Affair"	6:11
10.	"Dream 13"	4:28
11.	"Freaky Fever (Radio Version)"	3:21

== Credits ==
- Arranged By – LaZar
- Art Direction – Coco St. Clair
- Backing Vocals – The Birds Of Paradise, Gabriella LaBlanca
- Concept By – Enzo Santiago, Skye d'Angelo
- Design – House Of Monique
- Directed By – Groovie Mann
- Engineer – Bruno Zorelli
- Flute – Varushka
- Handclaps [Magic] – Pierre, Suki
- Keyboards [Additional] – Sergio Z.
- Mastered By – Collin Jordan
- Mixed by – Buzz McCoy, Enzo Santiago
- Producer – Buzz McCoy
- Programmed by – Xavier Dolce
- Strings – Fredrico Villani
- Tenor saxophone – Max Baxter
- Written by – Santiago (tracks 2–11), d'Angelo (tracks 2, 3, 9), Peter Brown, Robert Rans (track 1)
