= Hit & Run Holiday =

- Original Interscope cover

Studio album by My Life with the Thrill Kill Kult
- Released: August 22, 1995
- Recorded: Starlust Studios (Los Angeles, California)
- Genres: Industrial dance, gothabilly
- Label: Interscope
- Producer: Buzz McCoy

My Life with the Thrill Kill Kult chronology
13 Above the Night (1993)	Hit & Run Holiday (1995)	A Crime for All Seasons (1997)

Professional ratings
Review scores
Source	Rating
AllMusic	4/5 stars

Hit & Run Holiday is the fifth studio album by industrial disco band My Life with the Thrill Kill Kult. It was originally released in 1995 on Interscope Records. The band describes it as a surf-punk meets Motown sound that tells the story of vixen Krystal Starlust and drifter Apollo.

== Recording ==
Hit & Run Holiday was the band's second album for Interscope. It was recorded and mixed at Starlust Studios, Los Angeles.

== Release ==
Hit & Run Holiday was originally released on Interscope in 1995. It was later reissued on Rykodisc in cardboard box format in 1999.

== Touring ==
The band toured the U.S. in support of the album from October to November 1995. The support acts on the Hit & Run Holiday Tour were Big Stick, Eve's Plum, and Superstar DJ Traci Lords.

== Track listing ==
No.	Title	Length
1.	"Hit & Run Holiday"	3:02
2.	"Glamour Is a Rocky Road"	3:27
3.	"Portrait of the Damned"	4:25
4.	"Apollo 69"	4:04
5.	"Chemical Cop-Out"	2:41
6.	"Babylon Drifter"	3:39
7.	"Hottest Party in Town"	2:31
8.	"Golden Strip"	3:46
9.	"The Doris Love Club"	2:30
10.	"Mindcage"	3:21
11.	"Mr. Eleganza"	3:41
12.	"Universal Luxury"	3:35
13.	"Hot Blood Risin'"	2:54
14.	"Mission: Stardust"	4:01
15.	"The Last Ride Out"	3:22

== Credits ==
- Backing vocals – Arena Rock, Ava Lucious Whyte, Cookie Bo'Kay, Lois Blue
- Bass – Levi Levi
- Co-producer – Carmen Marusich
- Drums – Dick Fury
- Guitar – Buzz McCoy
- Keyboards – Kitty Killdare
- Management – Tony Ferguson
- Producer – Buzz McCoy
- Vocals – Groovie Mann, Jacky Blacque, Cinderella Pussie
- Written by – Buzz McCoy, Groovie Mann
