= David Schelzel =

American singer, songwriter and guitarist

- Born: David G. Schelzel; 26 September 1967 (age 58)
- Origin: Hershey, Pennsylvania
- Occupations: Musician; singer; songwriter
- Instruments: Vocals; guitar
- Years active: 1986–present
- Member of: The Ocean Blue
- Website: www.theoceanblue.com

David G. Schelzel (born 26 September 1967) is an American singer, songwriter, and musician. He is best known as the lead vocalist and guitarist of the band The Ocean Blue, which he founded alongside Steve Lau, Bobby Mittan, and Rob Minnig in the mid-1980s while they were students in Junior High in Hershey, Pennsylvania.

== Early life and career ==
Schelzel was born on 26 September 1967, and grew up in Hershey, Pennsylvania. Schelzel was particularly interested in "college-radio" and what was considered "underground" during his childhood and teenage years and cited The Smiths as one of his musical influences. In 1988, when he was still in high school, The Ocean Blue signed a three-album deal with Sire Records. This record deal allowed the group to release their self-titled album in 1989.

== Other Work ==
In addition to his career as a musician, Schelzel is also an attorney, having obtained his J.D. from the University of Minnesota Law school. He currently serves as a partner at Best & Flanagan in Minneapolis, where he has lived since 1997. Additionally, he is also the City Attorney for the City of Wayzata, MN.
