= Justin Bennett =

American musician

- Birth name: Justin Gabriel Isaac Bennett
- Born: December 18, 1973 (age 51)
- Genres: Electronica, industrial rock, electro-industrial
- Occupation(s): Touring and session drummer, producer
- Instrument: Drums
- Years active: 1995–present
- Website: Official website

Justin Bennett is an American studio and live session musician and producer. He has been working professionally since 1995 since his first project Professional Murder Music featured in the hit Arnold Schwarzenegger film End of Days and he has participated on tours and albums with a number of notable bands and artists, including Skinny Puppy, ohGr, My Life With The Thrill Kill Kult, Peter Murphy and Rozz Williams as well as forming his own projects kETvECTOR, Bahntier, Askew, American Memory Project, and The Implicate Order. He currently resides in Bologna, Italy.

== American Memory ==
Bennett worked on a video project called American Memory with guitarist William Morrison. According to Morrison, the idea of the project is that far in the future, after America no longer exists, an archive of American audio and visual material is discovered by a group of artists, who reinterpret their findings and broadcast them back in time.

== Tours ==
American Memory toured with ohGr in the United States and Canada in 2008, adding visuals to the shows. Bennett toured with Skinny Puppy on their last three tours, "Greater Wrong of the Right", "Mythrus", and "In Solvent See". In spring 2010 he toured with My Life with the Thrill Kill Kult and Bahntier.
