= The Reincarnation of Luna =

- Original SleazeBox cover

Studio album by My Life with the Thrill Kill Kult
- Released: October 2, 2001
- Recorded: Starlust Studios (Los Angeles, California)
- Genre: Industrial dance
- Label: SleazeBox Records
- Producer: Buzz McCoy

My Life with the Thrill Kill Kult chronology
A Crime for All Seasons (1997)	The Reincarnation of Luna (2001)	Gay, Black and Married (2005)

Professional ratings
Review scores
Source	Rating
AllMusic	2.5/5 stars

The Reincarnation of Luna is a 2001 studio album by industrial disco band My Life with the Thrill Kill Kult.

== Recording ==
The Reincarnation of Luna was recorded and mixed at Starlust Studios, Los Angeles.

== Release ==
The Reincarnation of Luna was originally released by SleazeBox Records in 2001. It was later re-recorded and remixed for a 2007 release on Rykodisc under the name The Resurrection of Luna with the additional tracks "Ocean of Hate", "Hallowed Be My Name" and "Temptation Serenade (Remix)".

== Track listing ==
No.	Title	Length
1.	"Radio Silicon"	5:55
2.	"The Untouchable Class"	3:39
3.	"Hour of Zero"	5:11
4.	"The Kult Konnection"	5:28
5.	"Girl Without a Planet"	4:48
6.	"Temptation Serenade"	6:19
7.	"Bettie"	4:57
8.	"Flesh Playhouse"	5:05
9.	"Heelz Afire"	4:36
10.	"Jungle of Love"	6:51
11.	"Asylum Disciple"	6:55
12.	"Theme De Luna"	6:11

== Credits ==
- Artwork – McCoy, Mann
- Mastered by – Chris Greene
- Performer – The Bomb Gang Girlz, Thrill Kill Kult
- Producer – Buzz McCoy
- Written by – Buzz McCoy, Groovie Mann
