= My Life with the Thrill Kill Kult =

American industrial music group

- Origin: Chicago, Illinois, U.S.
- Genres: Industrial, industrial rock, industrial dance
- Years active: 1987–present
- Labels: Interscope/Atlantic, Red Ant, Rykodisc, SleazeBox, Wax Trax!/TVT
- Spinoffs: Excessive Force
- Members: Groovie Mann; Buzz McCoy; Mimi Star; Arena Rock; Justin Bennett
- Past members: Jacky Blacque; Shawn Christopher; Davey Dasher; Sekret Dame DeZyre; Brett Frana; Dick Fury; Kitty Killdare; Linda LeSabre; Lydia Lunch; Curse Mackey; Bruce Manning; Otto Matix; Ruth McArdle; Sinderella Pussy; Arena Rock; Pepper Somerset; Brian St. Clair; Skip Towne; Thomas Thorn; William Tucker; Charles Levi; Westin Halvorson; Xtina X Alex Uberman
- Website: mylifewiththethrillkillkult.com

My Life with the Thrill Kill Kult (often shortened to Thrill Kill Kult or TKK) is an American electronic industrial rock band originally based in Chicago and founded by Groovie Mann (born Frank Nicholas Nardiello) and Buzz McCoy (born Marston Daley). They became known in the 1980s as pioneers of the industrial music genre – although by the early 1990s they had changed to a more disco-oriented sound – and as a frequent target of censorship groups, including the PMRC, which objected to the band's humorous and satirical references to Satan, Jesus and sex in their song lyrics and stage shows.

During the early 1990s, Thrill Kill Kult had several hits on the U.S. dance club and alternative charts. They also contributed songs to several movie soundtracks and appeared in the 1994 film The Crow. The band has continued to record and tour with a rotating lineup in addition to core members Mann and McCoy. In 2017, the band celebrated its 30th anniversary.

== History ==
Nardiello and Daley met in 1987 while touring together with the band Ministry. Soon after, Nardiello and Daley began to conceive an art film to be called My Life with the Thrill Kill Kult – a headline taken from a British tabloid Nardiello had noted a few years prior when he lived in London. The film was never completed, but the music they had recorded for its soundtrack appealed to Wax Trax! Records, who released the completed songs as a three-track EP.

Dubbing themselves Groovie Mann (Nardiello) and Buzz McCoy (Daley), they launched My Life with the Thrill Kill Kult. When the first EP sold well, a full-length album, I See Good Spirits and I See Bad Spirits, followed in 1988. Both attracted attention from college radio stations and dancefloors, as well as religious groups who balked at the overtly occult imagery in both the music and the artwork of the releases. The group continued to stoke controversy with each subsequent release, which included a remix EP entitled Nervous Xians, and they became even more popular with release of the 12-inch single "Kooler Than Jesus".

Thrill Kill Kult's second album, Confessions of a Knife..., became one of the best-selling releases on Wax Trax!, and continued to goad parental groups with song titles like "A Daisy Chain 4 Satan" and "Rivers of Blood, Years of Darkness".

Along with labelmates Ministry, KMFDM, and Front 242, Thrill Kill Kult helped develop the industrial music genre, but they themselves continued to evolve, creating a sound that was not easily identified or categorized. It was electronic club music with heavy beats, reminiscent of both disco and funk, yet amplified to a sometimes abrasive level. Thrill Kill Kult reflected a shift where dance records could be ominous and aggressive, and they laced their music with riffs and references that would seem more at home in a heavy metal group. One of their most distinctive characteristics is their use of spoken-word samples lifted from B-movies and old television shows.

At the onset of their career, the band's music was known as having a "satanic" theme, although used in a satirical sense. The occult element of the band has moved to the background in recent years, as they have focused more on their sleazy disco sound although still laden with satire. The 1991 album Sexplosion! marked TKK's leap toward more psychedelic house beats and their later grind house lounge sound. Later albums expanded upon these sounds and explored new directions as well, such as the 1995 Interscope release Hit & Run Holiday, which combined the Kult's signature electronic sound with a psychedelic surf rock/go-go theme reminiscent of 1960s garage rock and more modern acts like The B-52's.

Jacky Blacque died in May 2025.

== Live shows ==
Mann and McCoy recruited Thomas Thorn (a.k.a. Buck Ryder) to play keyboards and administer samples on the band's first tour. Brian Gillespie (a.k.a. Skip Town) from The Five and later Concussion Ensemble played a classic Slingerland Silver Sparkle drum set with sample triggers. The live act also featured female backup singers referred to as "The Bomb Gang Girlz", among the first of whom were Jacky Blaque, Rhonda Bond and Kitty Killdare.

Thorn soon departed amicably from the live act to form his own band, The Electric Hellfire Club (which embraced the overtly Satanic themes with which My Life with the Thrill Kill Kult had only flirted).

My Life with the Thrill Kill Kult had a revolving cast of characters in their stage show over the years, as well as a number of artists, sound technicians, musicians, and filmmakers. However, the core of the band has always been Mann and McCoy.

The "Sexplosion!" tour in 1991 achieved a particularly edgy reputation. In addition to its staging, which featured a bar and bartender onstage with the band, the show also featured a male/female duo known as Ten and Avaluscious White, who appeared onstage dressed in a number of different guises. At one point, Ten was dressed as Jesus strapped to a cross and featuring a large black dildo or alternately a large sausage between his legs, while Avaluscious White dressed as a demon girl performed simulated oral sex on him. This created controversy and protest in a number of American locations, adding to the band's notoriety.

In the summer of 2010, the band once again hit the road with Lords of Acid, with whom they had previously toured on the Sextacy Ball Tour in 1995. The 2010 tour was originally titled Sextacy Ball 2, but was changed to the Sextreme Ball for legal reasons.

In 2012, My Life with the Thrill Kill Kult announced their 25-year anniversary tour covering over 30 dates in the US tour featuring direct support by Left Spine Down.

== Record labels ==
Thrill Kill Kult left Wax Trax! Records after their third album, Sexplosion!, surpassed Confessions to become the biggest seller on the imprint, and major label Interscope Records took notice. TKK signed to Interscope, which re-released Sexplosion! and garnered the band their most familiar alternative radio hit, "Sex on Wheelz". Their following two albums, 13 Above the Night and Hit & Run Holiday, were recorded for Interscope until they parted with the label in 1996. The band's subsequent album, A Crime for All Seasons, was released on Red Ant Records.

In 2001 the album The Reincarnation of Luna appeared on their own Sleazebox Records imprint, distributed by Invisible Records. The band released a companion piece to Luna called Golden Pillz: The Luna Remixes, as well as a live album called Elektrik Inferno. Rykodisc became the band's next and most current home after putting out the rarities compilation Dirty Little Secrets. Rykodisc eventually released My Life with the Thrill Kill Kult's entire back catalog, as well as a new "best-of" compilation, a non-stop megamix album featuring mash-ups of tracks from different eras called (Diamonds & Daggerz), and a long-unreleased project entitled Gay, Black & Married.

In 2009, the band's own SleazeBox Records joined forces with Italy's Rustblade label and have together released TKK's most recent CDs Blood + Dope + Sin + Gold (2008), Death Threat (2009) and Sinister Whisperz (2011).

== Soundtracks ==
Thrill Kill Kult has contributed songs to soundtracks of several films, including Cool World (1992), Totally Fucked Up (1993), The Crow (1994), The Flintstones (1994), Showgirls (1995), Baseketball (1998), The Amityville Legacy (2016) and Nemesis 5: The New Model (2018). They were used in dialog for The Doom Generation (1995) and Sexy Evil Genius (2013). They also appeared in The Crow performing in the nightclub shootout scene.

== Related projects ==
Both Mann and McCoy have worked on various side projects and with other bands and musicians.

=== Groovie Mann ===
- Special Affect – with Marty Sorenson on bass, Al Jourgensen on guitar and Harry Rushakoff on drums
- Drowning Craze
- Darling Kandie – with William Tucker
- Fred EP with Fred Giannelli
- The Katastrophe Klown
- Trash Deity

=== Buzz McCoy ===
- Rota (Rights of the Accused) – as a producer for a cover of Kiss's "Do You Love Me?"
- Excessive Force – with Sascha Konietzko of KMFDM
- Pigface – on the live album Welcome to Mexico... Asshole
- Cherrie Blue – with Ruth McArdle (a.k.a. Lady Galore) from Lords of Acid
- Bomb Gang Girlz

McCoy has also remixed tracks for bands such as Radio Iodine, KMFDM, Evil Mothers, Pigface, Voodou, and Professional Murder Music.

== Wax Trax! Deejays ==
As an original Wax Trax! artist, Buzz McCoy returned to Chicago February 23, 2007, to DJ Classic Wax Trax! rarities and remixes from his personal collection at famed TKK hangout, Berlin Chicago.

== Discography ==
- I See Good Spirits and I See Bad Spirits (1988)
- Confessions of a Knife... (1990)
- Sexplosion! (1991)
- 13 Above the Night (1993)
- Hit & Run Holiday (1995)
- A Crime for All Seasons (1997)
- The Reincarnation of Luna (2001)
- Gay, Black and Married (2005)
- The Filthiest Show in Town (2007)
- Death Threat (2009)
- Spooky Tricks (2014)
- In the House of Strange Affairs (2019)
