= Films About Ghosts (The Best Of...) =

Films About Ghosts (The Best of...)

Greatest hits album by Counting Crows
- Released: November 2, 2003
- Recorded: 1993–2003
- Genre: Alternative rock
- Length: 75:36 (US); 76:40 (UK)
- Label: Geffen
- Producers: David Bryson, T Bone Burnett, Dennis Herring, Steve Lillywhite, David Lowery, Gil Norton, Brendan O'Brien

Counting Crows chronology
Hard Candy (2002)	Films About Ghosts (The Best of...) (2003)	New Amsterdam: Live at Heineken Music Hall 2003 (2006)

Professional ratings
Review scores
Source	Rating
AllMusic	4.5/5 stars
The Rolling Stone Album Guide	2/5 stars
Uncut	4/5 stars

Films About Ghosts (The Best of...) is a compilation album by American rock band Counting Crows. It was released by Geffen Records on November 2, 2003. The album contains songs from their first four studio albums. The album takes its name from a line in "Mrs. Potter's Lullaby": "If dreams are like movies, then memories are films about ghosts."

== Track listing ==
Films About Ghosts (The Best Of...) track listing
No.	Title	Writer(s)	Length
1.	"Angels of the Silences" (from Recovering the Satellites)	Adam Duritz, Charlie Gillingham	3:39
2.	"Round Here" (from August and Everything After)	Duritz, David Bryson, Dave Janusko, Dan Jewett, Chris Roldan	5:32
3.	"Rain King" (from August and Everything After)	Duritz, Bryson	4:17
4.	"A Long December" (from Recovering the Satellites)	Duritz	4:58
5.	"Hanginaround" (from This Desert Life)	Duritz, Bryson, Dan Vickrey, Ben Mize	4:16
6.	"Mrs. Potter's Lullaby" (from This Desert Life)	Duritz	7:46
7.	"Mr. Jones" (from August and Everything After)	Duritz, Bryson	4:33
8.	"Recovering the Satellites" (from Recovering the Satellites)	Duritz	5:25
9.	"American Girls" (from Hard Candy)	Duritz	4:35
10.	"Big Yellow Taxi" (from Hard Candy / with Vanessa Carlton)	Joni Mitchell	3:46
11.	"Omaha" (from August and Everything After)	Duritz	3:41
12.	"Friend of the Devil" (previously unreleased Grateful Dead cover)	Jerry Garcia, Robert Hunter, John Dawson	4:37
13.	"Einstein on the Beach (For an Eggman)" (from compilation album DGC Rarities Vol.1)	Duritz, Bryson	3:53
14.	"Anna Begins" (from August and Everything After)	Duritz, Bryson, Marty Jones, Toby Hawkins, Lydia Holly	4:32
15.	"Holiday in Spain" (from Hard Candy)	Duritz	3:50
16.	"She Don't Want Nobody Near" (previously unreleased)	Duritz, Brendan O'Brien	3:08

Pressings of the disc from mid-2004 onward include "Accidentally in Love", the Crows' hit single from the soundtrack of DreamWorks Animation Studios' Shrek 2 (2004). The Dutch version of the album includes a new version of "Holiday in Spain", recorded as a duet with Dutch band Bløf. The single, in English and Dutch, went to number one in the Netherlands, as did the album after the success of the single.

The original British version contained the song "Blues Run the Game", a cover of a Jackson C. Frank song and later pressing have a version of "Four White Stallions" from New Amsterdam: Live at Heineken Music Hall February 4–6, 2003. The South American version contained the latter and Enhanced CD data.

This album was released twice in Australia, the second release containing a DVD of live performances. A version with a second disc containing the music videos of "American Girls", "Mrs. Potter's Lullaby", "Angels of the Silences", "Round Here", "Daylight Fading", "A Long December", "Hanginaround" and "Mr. Jones" was also released in the United Kingdom.

== Release history ==
Country	Date
United States	November 25, 2003
United Kingdom	January 26, 2004

== Charts ==
=== Weekly charts ===
Chart (2003–2004)	Peak position
Australian Albums (ARIA)	70
Belgian Albums (Ultratop Flanders)	73
Canadian Albums (Nielsen Soundscan)	71
Dutch Albums (Album Top 100)	1
Irish Albums (IRMA)	41
Scottish Albums (Official Charts)	8
UK Albums (Official Charts)	15
US Billboard 200	32

=== Year-end charts ===
Chart (2004)	Position
Dutch Albums (Album Top 100)	22
US Billboard 200	128

=== Single ===
Year	Single	Chart	Position
2004	"Accidentally in Love"	UK Singles Chart	28

== Certifications ==
Region	Certification	Certified units/sales
Netherlands (NVPI)	Platinum	80,000^{^}
New Zealand (RMNZ)	Gold	7,500^{^}
United Kingdom (BPI)	Gold	100,000^{*}
United States (RIAA)	Gold	500,000^{^}
^{*} Sales figures based on certification alone.^{^} Shipments figures based on certification alone.
