= Accidentally in Love (song) =

2004 single by Counting Crows

Single by Counting Crows

from the album Shrek 2: Motion Picture Soundtrack
- B-side: "American Girls" (live); "If I Could Give All My Love (Richard Manuel Is Dead)" (live)
- Released: May 3, 2004
- Genre: Pop rock
- Length: 3:08
- Label: Geffen; DreamWorks
- Songwriters: Adam Duritz; Dan Vickrey; David Bryson; Matt Malley; David Immerglück
- Producer: Brendan O'Brien

Counting Crows singles chronology
"She Don't Want Nobody Near" (2003)	"Accidentally in Love" (2004)	"Holiday in Spain" (2004)

"Accidentally in Love" is a song by American rock band Counting Crows. The song was written for the opening scene of the 2004 DreamWorks animated film Shrek 2 and appears on the movie's soundtrack as the opening track. It was released as a single on May 3, 2004, two weeks before the movie premiered in theaters. "Accidentally in Love" was commercially successful, peaking within the top 40 on several music charts, including the Irish Singles Chart, where it reached number three and spent 10 weeks in the top 50. The song was nominated for Best Original Song at the 77th Academy Awards.

== Background ==
DreamWorks Animation chose Counting Crows lead singer Adam Duritz to write a song that would be featured in the opening scene of their 2004 film Shrek 2, in which Shrek and his wife, Princess Fiona, celebrate their honeymoon following the events of the first movie. To get an idea on how to write the song, Duritz went to the DreamWorks animation camp and watched approximately half of the film. Duritz reported to Billboard magazine that he almost did not write the song, as he was not used to writing songs on demand and was experiencing a block. However, DreamWorks allowed him creative freedom on the song and did not force him to work tirelessly.

According to Duritz, the song had to be uplifting, and the studio told him to write a song about himself, not Shrek. Duritz said that the song was indeed about the events that were happening in his life during the writing process, including falling in love with an "inconvenient" lover. He was happy with the track's results, especially since it would appeal to multiple age groups, and he also claimed that "Accidentally in Love" would be "timeless" since it was an original song written for a film.

== Release ==
Geffen Records and DreamWorks Records released the song to American hot adult contemporary and triple A radio stations on May 3, 2004, two weeks before Shrek 2 premiered in theaters. On June 8, 2004, it was serviced to contemporary hit radio. A digital download of the song was released on July 5, 2004, in various countries, including the United States, Canada, and the United Kingdom. In the latter country, a CD single was issued on July 12, 2004, containing live versions of "American Girls" and "If I Could Give All My Love (Richard Manuel Is Dead)" recorded in Oslo, Norway, as well the song's music video. In Australia, a different CD single was issued, containing a live version of "Miami" from Oslo and the music video.

== Critical reception ==
Billboard magazine reviewed the song on their May 22, 2004, issue, with Susanne Ault writing that "Accidentally in Love" was the "perfect kickoff for the summer" and would please both children and their parents, going on to write that it contains a "light and breezy" hook for the beach season. However, she also noted that the song's success would be temporary and called it "a little sappy". Reviewing the film's soundtrack on AllMusic, Heather Phares called the song a cross between one of the Counting Crows' older songs and "Closer to Free" by BoDeans, targeting parents and older siblings rather than children. On the same site, Johnny Loftus wrote that "Accidentally in Love" was the band's most "uplifting" song since "Hanginaround" in 1999 and that the band approached the track well, referring to its beat as "cartoon-y sunshine" and its chorus as "love-drenched XTC". Dillon Eastoe of British news site Gigwise called the track "brilliant". In April 2022, American Songwriter ranked the song at number seven on their list of "The Top 10 Counting Crows Songs".

"Accidentally in Love" was nominated for the Academy Award for Best Original Song; Counting Crows performed the song at the ceremony but did not win the award. The song also received nominations for the Golden Globe Award for Best Original Song and the Grammy Award for Best Song Written for a Motion Picture, Television or Other Visual Media.

== Chart performance ==
In the United States, "Accidentally in Love" topped the Billboard Triple-A chart for five weeks in July and August 2004. On the Billboard Hot 100, it debuted at number 61 on June 26, 2004, rising to its peak of number 39 eight weeks later (on August 21) and spending 20 weeks on the chart. It also appeared on several other Billboard rankings, reaching number three on the Adult Top 40, number 23 on the Adult Contemporary chart, and number 35 on the Mainstream Top 40. The Recording Industry Association of America (RIAA) awarded the song a gold disc in January 2005 for shipping over 500,000 units.

Overseas, the single found its highest national chart peak in Ireland. It first appeared on the Irish Singles Chart at number six on the week ending July 15, 2004, taking three weeks to reach its peak of number three, where it remained for three weeks. It spent 10 weeks in the top 50, tallying its final week on September 16 at number 49. In the United Kingdom, the song debuted and peaked at number 28 on the UK Singles Chart and logged five weeks in the top 100. In October 2024, it was certified platinum by the British Phonographic Industry (BPI) for sales and streaming figures exceeding 600,000.

Across mainland Europe, "Accidentally in Love" peaked at number 86 in Germany, number 59 in Austria, and number 47 in Romania. It became a top-20 hit in Hungary and the Netherlands, achieving a peak of number 12 in the former country and number 14 in the latter. In Hungary, it was the 54th-most-aired song of 2004, and in the Netherlands, it was the 97th-best-selling single of the year according to the Dutch Top 40. On Australia's ARIA Singles Chart, the track charted for 13 weeks, peaking at number 11 on August 15, 2004, and ended the year at number 78 on the ARIA year-ending ranking. The same year, it was awarded a gold certification by the Australian Recording Industry Association, denoting 35,000 shipments. In New Zealand, the song grazed the top 40, making its only chart appearance at number 39 on the week of September 27, 2004.

== Music video ==
The main music video for the song, directed by Meiert Avis, features a stuffed toy rabbit (voiced by and modeled after the band's frontman Adam Duritz) in the apartment of a young couple (the girl is Ashley Roberts from the Pussycat Dolls and the boy is LA Models model Steve Vanda), complete with a TV showing scenes from the film. The rabbit comes to life and serenades the girl. She falls in love with him and leaves her boyfriend behind while he is in the kitchen making breakfast for her. The band itself is not present at all in the video.

An alternative music video for the song is included on the Shrek 2 DVD as a bonus feature and combines clips from the movie with scenes of Duritz recording the song.

== Track listings ==
UK 7-inch picture disc single

A1. "Accidentally in Love"
B1. "American Girls" (live in Oslo)
B2. "If I Could Give All My Love (Richard Manuel Is Dead)" (live in Oslo)

UK CD single

1. "Accidentally in Love"
2. "American Girls" (live in Oslo)
3. "If I Could Give All My Love (Richard Manuel Is Dead)" (live in Oslo)
4. "Accidentally in Love" (video)

European CD single

1. "Accidentally in Love" – 3:09
2. "American Girls" (live in Oslo) – 4:29

Australian CD single

1. "Accidentally in Love" – 3:09
2. "Miami" (live in Oslo) – 4:59
3. "Accidentally in Love" (video) – 3:09

== Charts ==
=== Weekly charts ===
Chart (2004–2005)	Peak position
Australia (ARIA)	11
Austria (Ö3 Austria Top 40)	59
Canada (Nielsen BDS)	8
Canada AC Top 30 (Radio & Records)	17
Canada Hot AC Top 30 (Radio & Records)	1
Germany (GfK)	86
Hungary (Rádiós Top 40)	12
Ireland (IRMA)	3
Netherlands (Dutch Top 40)	15
Netherlands (Single Top 100)	14
New Zealand (Recorded Music NZ)	39
Romania (Romanian Top 100)	47
Scottish Singles Sales (Official Charts)	24
UK Singles (Official Charts)	28
US Billboard Hot 100	39
US Adult Alternative Airplay (Billboard)	1
US Adult Contemporary (Billboard)	23
US Adult Pop Airplay (Billboard)	3
US Pop Airplay (Billboard)	35

=== Year-end charts ===
Chart (2004)	Position
Australia (ARIA)	78
Hungary (Rádiós Top 40)	54
Netherlands (Dutch Top 40)	97
US Adult Contemporary (Billboard)	45
US Adult Top 40 (Billboard)	12
US Triple-A (Billboard)	7

== Certifications ==
Region	Certification	Certified units/sales
Australia (ARIA)	Gold	35,000^{^}
New Zealand (RMNZ)	Platinum	30,000^{‡}
Spain (Promusicae)	Gold	30,000^{‡}
United Kingdom (BPI)	Platinum	600,000^{‡}
United States (RIAA)	Gold	500,000^{*}
^{*} Sales figures based on certification alone.^{^} Shipments figures based on certification alone.^{‡} Sales+streaming figures based on certification alone.

== Release history ==
Region	Date	Format(s)	Label(s)	Ref.
United States	May 3, 2004	Hot adult contemporary; triple A radio	Geffen; DreamWorks	
United States	June 8, 2004	Contemporary hit radio	Geffen; DreamWorks	
United States	July 5, 2004	Digital download	Geffen; DreamWorks	
Canada	July 5, 2004	Digital download	Geffen; DreamWorks	
United Kingdom	July 5, 2004	Digital download	Geffen; DreamWorks	
United Kingdom	July 12, 2004	CD	Geffen; DreamWorks	
