= House of Love (Amy Grant album) =

Studio album by Amy Grant
- Released: August 23, 1994
- Recorded: 1993–1994
- Studio: The Bennett House and Tejas Recorders (Franklin, Tennessee); Soundshop Recording Studios, Secret Sound and MasterMix (Nashville, Tennessee)
- Genre: Pop, contemporary Christian music
- Length: 48:08
- Label: A&M, Myrrh
- Producer: Michael Omartian; Keith Thomas

Amy Grant chronology
Home for Christmas (1992)	House of Love (1994)	Behind the Eyes (1997)

Singles from House of Love
- 1. "Lucky One" Released: 1994; 2. "House of Love" Released: November 28, 1994; 3. "Say You'll Be Mine" Released: 1994; 4. "Big Yellow Taxi" Released: March 1995; 5. "Oh How the Years Go By" Released: 1995

Professional ratings
Review scores
Source	Rating
AllMusic	3/5 stars

House of Love is the eleventh studio album by Christian and pop singer Amy Grant, released in 1994.

The album is the follow-up to Grant's quintuple-platinum 1991 release Heart in Motion. Although House of Love sold less than half of what its predecessor sold, it similarly combines pop music with Christian values. "Lucky One" was the album's biggest hit, peaking at No. 18 on the Billboard Hot 100 and No. 2 on the Adult Contemporary chart in the U.S., followed by the title song and a remake of Joni Mitchell's "Big Yellow Taxi". "Say You'll Be Mine" also was a Top 50 hit on the UK singles chart. When it was released in 1994, House of Love was the biggest initial release in Christian music history, shipping almost a half million copies on its first day alone.

Copies of this album sold in Europe, Australia and Japan feature the additional track "Politics of Kissing". Some of the album's other tracks garnered more notice later on when covered by other artists. "The Power" (written by Tommy Sims and Judson Spence) is featured on Cher's 1998 album Believe, and Vanessa Williams had an Adult Contemporary hit with her version of "Oh How the Years Go By" (written by Simon Climie and Will Jennings) from her 1997 album Next.

In 2007, House of Love was reissued and digitally remastered by Grant's new record label, EMI/Sparrow Records. The remastered edition is labeled with a "Digitally Remastered" logo in the 'gutter' on the CD front.

On September 27, 2024, in celebration of the album's 30th anniversary, it was reissued in expanded form: the original 11-song album with the inclusion of the non-album b-sides ("Politics of Kissing" and "Life’s Gonna Change"), remixes, alternate mixes and re-recordings of previously released songs. The reissue was released in two formats: a 2-CD/digital version and a 2-LP version with the non-album b-sides and selected track mixes from the 2-CD/digital version.

== Track listing ==
No.	Title	Writer(s)	Length
1.	"Lucky One"	Amy Grant, Keith Thomas	4:11
2.	"Say You'll Be Mine"	Grant, Wayne Kirkpatrick, Thomas	4:04
3.	"Whatever It Takes"	Grant, Gary Chapman, Thomas	4:10
4.	"House of Love" (duet with Vince Gill)	Greg Barnhill, Kenny Greenberg, Wally Wilson	4:38
5.	"The Power"	Tommy Sims, Judson Spence	3:54
6.	"Oh How the Years Go By"	Simon Climie, Will Jennings	5:12
7.	"Big Yellow Taxi"	Joni Mitchell	3:01
8.	"Helping Hand"	Grant, Beverly Darnall, Sims	4:39
9.	"Love Has a Hold On Me"	Grant, Thomas	3:55
10.	"Our Love"	Grant, Tom Hemby	5:08
11.	"Children of the World"	Grant, Kirkpatrick, Sims	5:16

- For the UK version of the album, the "Big Yellow Taxi" b-side "Politics of Kissing" is listed as track 9 (in between "Helping Hand" and "Love Has a Hold On Me") and "Say You'll Be Mine" (Radio Mix) is listed as track 13, closing out the album.

30th Anniversary Expanded Edition (disc one bonus tracks)
No.	Title	Writer(s)	Length
12.	"House of Love" (Michael Omartian Version)	Barnhill, Greenberg, Wilson	4:12
13.	"Oh How the Years Go By" (Keith Thomas Version)	Climie, Jennings	5:00

30th Anniversary Expanded Edition (disc two)
No.	Title	Writer(s)	Length
1.	"The Power" (2024 Version)	Sims, Spence	3:30
2.	"Helping Hand" (2024 Version)	Grant, Darnall, Sims	4:24
3.	"Politics of Kissing" ("Big Yellow Taxi" b-side)	Grant, Kirkpatrick, Clif Magness	4:14
4.	"Life's Gonna Change" ("Say You'll Be Mine" b-side)	Grant, Michael Omartian	3:42
5.	"House of Love" (The Classic Philly Soul Mix)	Barnhill, Greenberg, Wilson	4:31
6.	"Lucky One" (The Lucky Street Mix)	Grant, Thomas	3:57
7.	"Big Yellow Taxi" (The Alternate Paradise Mix)	Mitchell	3:02
8.	"House of Love" (The South Street Mix)	Barnhill, Greenberg, Wilson	4:35
9.	"Lucky One" (The A/C Rhythm Mix)	Grant, Thomas	3:42
10.	"Say You’ll Be Mine" (Radio Mix)	Grant, Kirkpatrick, Thomas	3:37
11.	"Lucky One" (Remix)	Grant, Thomas	4:05
12.	"Big Yellow Taxi" (The Paradise Mix)	Mitchell	3:05
13.	"Children of the World" / "Jesus Loves the Little Children"	Grant, Kirkpatrick, Sims / Traditional	5:37
14.	"Lucky One" (Kupper Radio)	Grant, Thomas	3:41
15.	"Oh How The Years Go By" (Radio Mix with Intro)	Climie, Jennings	5:15
16.	"Lucky One" (Kupper 12” Mix)	Grant, Thomas	5:20
17.	"Lucky One" (Churban 12” Mix)	Grant, Thomas	5:42

== Personnel ==
- Amy Grant – vocals
- Keith Thomas – acoustic piano (1–3, 9), synthesizers (1–4, 9, 11), bass programming (1–3, 9), drum programming (1, 3), electric piano (4), additional synthesizer programming (5), percussion programming (9, 11)
- Phil Madeira – Hammond B3 organ (4, 11)
- Michael Omartian – keyboards (6–8, 10), drum sequencing (8), horn arrangements (8)
- Tom Hemby – keyboards (10), guitars (10), drum programming (10)
- Jerry McPherson – electric guitars (1, 3, 4, 11), guitars (7)
- Scott Denté – acoustic guitars (1, 11)
- Will Owsley – acoustic guitars (1, 5)
- Dann Huff – electric guitars (2), guitars (6, 8), acoustic guitar (9)
- Kenny Greenberg – acoustic guitars (4), electric guitars (4)
- Judson Spence – acoustic guitars (5)
- Brent Rowan – guitars (7), mandolin (7)
- Jerry Douglas – dobro (5)
- Gary Chapman – lap steel guitar (7)
- Tommy Sims – bass guitar (1, 4, 11), synthesizers (5), bass programming (5), drum programming (5)
- Danny O'Lannerghty – bass guitar (7)
- Mark Hammond – drum programming (1–3), drums (9)
- Chad Cromwell – drums (4, 11)
- Chris McHugh – drums (6, 7)
- Terry McMillan – percussion (4)
- Eric Darken – percussion (7)
- Mark Douthit – saxophone (8), soprano saxophone (10)
- Doug Moffett – saxophone (8)
- Mike Haynes – trumpet (8)
- George Tidwell – trumpet (8)
- Mark O'Connor – violin (11)
- Ronn Huff – string arrangements and conductor (5)
- Carl Gorodetzsky – string contractor (5)
- The Nashville String Machine – strings (5)

Background vocalists

- Athena Cage – backing vocals (1, 3)
- Amy Grant – backing vocals (1, 2, 8, 11)
- Lisa Keith – backing vocals (1)
- Ada Dyer – backing vocals (2–5)
- Judson Spence – backing vocals (2–5)
- Audrey Wheeler – backing vocals (2–5)
- Vince Gill – guest vocals (4)
- Tommy Sims – backing vocals (5)
- Ashley Cleveland – backing vocals (6–8)
- Donna McElroy – backing vocals (6, 8)
- Michael Mellett – backing vocals (6–8)
- Lisa Bevill – backing vocals (7)
- Gary Chapman – backing vocals (7)
- Chris Rodriguez – backing vocals (8)

Choirs (Track 11)

- Beverly Darnall – choir contractor
- Leann Albrecht, Jackie Cusic, Butch Curry, Beverly Darnall, Gail Farrell, Rick Gibson, Lisa Glasgow, David Holloway, Sarah Huffman, Michael Mellett, Donny Monk, Ellen Musick, Guy Penrod, Gary Robinson, Beau Stroupe, Kristine Stroupe, Leah Taylor, Melodie Tunney, Scott Williamson and Chris Willis – adult choir
- Isaac Darnall, Katy Dunham, Lance High, Aubrey Hunt, Asher Larrison, Shannon Love, Trevor Matheison and Mary Catherine Musick – children choir

Production

- Brown Bannister – executive producer
- Michael Blanton – executive producer
- Amy Grant – executive producer
- Keith Thomas – producer (1–5, 9, 11), arrangements (1–5, 9, 11)
- Michael Omartian – producer (6–8, 10)
- Todd Moore – production coordinator (1–5, 9, 11)
- Suzy Martinez – production coordinator (6–8, 10)
- Norman Moore – art direction, design
- Richard Frankel – art direction
- Albert Sanchez – photography

Technical credits

- Stephen Marcussen – mastering at Precision Mastering (Hollywood, California)
- Bill Whittington – recording (1–5, 9, 11), mixing (1–5, 9, 11)
- Terry Christian – engineer (6–8, 10), mixing (7, 8, 10)
- Mick Guzauski – mixing (6)
- Shawn McLean – assistant engineer (1–5, 9, 11)
- Greg Parker – assistant engineer (1–5, 9, 11)
- Danny Duncan – MIDI assistant (5)
- Mark Capps – assistant engineer (6–8, 10)
- John Dickson – assistant engineer (6–8, 10)
- Scott Link – assistant engineer (6–8, 10)
- Keith Robichaux – assistant engineer (6–8, 10)
- Jim Dineen – additional engineering (6–8, 10)

== Charts ==
=== Weekly charts ===
Chart (1994)	Peak position
Australian Albums (ARIA)	127
US Billboard 200	13
US Top Contemporary Christian	1

=== Year-end charts ===
Chart (1994)	Position
Billboard Top Contemporary Christian Albums	17

=== End-of-decade charts ===
Chart (1990–1999)	Rank
US Billboard Top Contemporary Christian	9

== Certifications and sales ==
Region	Certification	Certified units/sales
Canada (Music Canada)	Platinum	100,000^{^}
United States (RIAA)	2× Platinum	2,000,000^{^}
^{^} Shipments figures based on certification alone.
