= Shrek 2 (soundtrack) =

2004 film soundtrack album

Shrek 2 (Motion Picture Soundtrack)

Soundtrack album by various artists
- Released: May 11, 2004
- Genres: Rock; alternative rock; pop rock
- Length: 47:35
- Labels: DreamWorks, Geffen
- Producers: Brad Jones, Brendan O'Brien, Gustavo Santaolalla, Guy Sigsworth, Eric Valentine, Tony Visconti, Andy Zulla, John Alagía, Andrew Sherman, Joseph Arthur, Robin Eaton, Harry Gregson-Williams, Ken Rich, Butterfly Boucher, Juan Campodónico, Mark Oliver Everett

Singles from Shrek 2 (Motion Picture Soundtrack)
- 1. "Accidentally in Love" Released: May 3, 2004

Shrek 2 (Original Motion Picture Soundtrack) is the soundtrack album to the 2004 DreamWorks Animation film Shrek 2, the second instalment in the Shrek franchise and a sequel to Shrek (2001). The album was released on May 11, 2004, through DreamWorks Records and Geffen Records and featured 14 songs, most of them were licensed contemporary numbers, emulating a similar strategy that resulted in the success of the first film's soundtrack. An original song, "Accidentally in Love", was composed specifically for this film.

The album initially garnered a lukewarm reception, but topped the Billboard Top Soundtracks and Australian ARIA Charts. and its reception has improved in the years following its release. It was certified Platinum by the Recording Industry Association of America (RIAA) for selling over a million units. Successively, the song "Accidentally in Love" received a nomination for Academy Award for Best Original Song, Broadcast Film Critics Association Award for Best Song and a Grammy Award for Best Song Written for Visual Media, while the album also receiving a Grammy Award for Best Compilation Soundtrack Album for Motion Pictures, Television or Other Visual Media.

== Background and development ==
For the sequel, Chris Douridas served as the music supervisor, curating and producing the soundtrack. Like the first film, the sequel's soundtrack also included covers and renditions of pop hits which were licensed and incorporated for this film. However, an original song "Accidentally in Love" was written specifically for this film, which was performed by the rock band Counting Crows. The song was preceded as a single on May 3, 2004, to promote the album and the film and achieved significant commercial success. This song was considered a placeholder for one of the songs from an artist, (Note: The artist/band's name was not revealed by Douridas) to depict Shrek and Fiona's relationship in the opening sequence and Weezer's "Island in the Sun" was temped for it, but the artist refused to work on it, and as a result, the song "Accidentally in Love" was composed for that situation. Douridas said that the band watched the opening sequence of the film and impressed by it, had written the song within minutes. He further added that the band had cancelled their shows in Brussels at the last minute and recorded the song within a day.

For the rest of the songs, Andrew Adamson and Douridas brainstormed on selecting efficient needledrops that would compliment the story and while also being appealing. Other songs from indie rock bands such as Eels ("I Need Some Sleep") and Dashboard Confessional ("As Lovers Go") were also utilized in the film, while Tom Waits and Nick Cave who made cameo appearances in the film, had also allowed to use their songs "Little Drop of Poison" and "People Ain't No Good" (courtesy of Nick Cave and the Bad Seeds). Buzzcocks' "Ever Fallen in Love (With Someone You Shouldn't've)" was considered to be the favorite of Mike Myers (who voiced Shrek) as he found the band to be the underrated cultural influencers.

Douridas approached Guy Sigsworth to convince Imogen Heap to cover a version of "Holding Out for a Hero" by Bonnie Tyler for the film, as he was a fan and supporter of the electronic duo Frou Frou (featuring Sigsworth and Heap) which disbanded the group following the eventual failure of their debut album Details (2002), although "Let Go" attained popularity after its use in the soundtrack of Garden State. With Douridas' convinction, the duo appeared as Frou Frou to record the rendition of the song which featured in the closing credits. Rachel Brodsky of Vulture considered the cover to be a "simmering synth-pop gem that shows the power in a cover’s ability to both pay homage to and also reinvent a beloved classic". Another version of the song is covered by Jennifer Saunders, who played the fairy godmother.

== Track listing ==
No.	Title	Writer(s)	Producer(s)	Length
1.	"Accidentally in Love" (Counting Crows)	Adam Duritz; Dan Vickrey; David Immerglück; Matthew Malley	Brendan O'Brien	3:08
2.	"Holding Out for a Hero" (Frou Frou)	Dean Pitchford; Jim Steinman	Guy Sigsworth	3:22
3.	"Changes" (Butterfly Boucher featuring David Bowie)	David Bowie	Brad Jones; Robin Eaton; Butterfly Boucher; Tony Visconti (David Bowie)	3:22
4.	"As Lovers Go" (Ron Fair remix) (Dashboard Confessional)	Christopher Ender Carrabba		3:29
5.	"Funkytown" (Lipps Inc.)	Steven Greenberg		3:59
6.	"I'm on My Way" (Rich Price)	Rich Price; Clint Bierman	Andy Zulla	3:21
7.	"I Need Some Sleep" (Eels)	E	Mark Oliver Everett	2:28
8.	"Ever Fallen in Love" (Pete Yorn)	Peter Shelley	Eric Valentine	2:32
9.	"Little Drop of Poison" (Tom Waits)	Tom Waits; Kathleen Brennan		3:11
10.	"You're So True" (Joseph Arthur)	Joseph Arthur	John Alagía; Joseph Arthur; Ken Rich; Andrew Sherman	3:55
11.	"People Ain't No Good" (Nick Cave and the Bad Seeds)	Nick Cave		5:39
12.	"Fairy Godmother Song" (Jennifer Saunders)	Music: Harry Gregson-Williams; Stephen Barton; Lyrics: Walt Dohrn; Dave Smith; Andrew Adamson; Aron Warner	Harry Gregson-Williams	1:52
13.	"Livin' la Vida Loca" (Eddie Murphy Antonio Banderas and John Greenhalgh)	Desmond Child; Robi Rosa	Gustavo Santaolalla; Juan Campodónico; Aníbal Kerpel (assoc.)	3:29
14.	"Holding Out for a Hero" (bonus track) (Jennifer Saunders)	Pitchford; Steinman	Gregson-Williams	3:56
Total length:				47:43

== Reception ==
Professional ratings
Review scores
Source	Rating
AllMusic	3/5 stars

Initial reception for the album was initially unfavorable. Heather Phares of AllMusic said that "the album doesn't have as many surprises as its predecessor", adding that "none of the songs here have the same left-field feel [...] making Shrek 2 a lukewarm compromise that isn't likely to satisfy either audience." Peter Bradshaw of The Guardian said, in his review of the film itself, that the "subdued cover versions" of the songs felt "pedestrian" and "disappointing".

However, it has since undergone a reappraisal and has been considered "one of the quintessential albums of the 2000s" rivalling with Shrek. Esther Zuckerman of Thrillist who ranked the Shrek soundtrack on number 49 for their publication's best soundtracks, considered the Shrek 2 soundtrack to be better than the first film's as it had a "cooler" and "moodier" appeal in comparison with the first film's soundtrack which was "overwhelmingly, almost aggressively, upbeat".

Commercially, the soundtrack peaked at No. 10 position on the Billboard 200 and topped the Soundtrack charts. Like the first film's soundtrack, it also received wide international success, though not on the same level as its predecessor. The album sold around 1.2 million units in the United States.

== Chart positions ==
Chart (2004)	Peak position
Australian Albums (ARIA)	1
Austrian Albums (Ö3 Austria)	13
Belgian Albums (Ultratop Flanders)	61
Belgian Albums (Ultratop Wallonia)	98
Canadian Albums (Billboard)	12
French Albums (SNEP)	35
German Albums (Offizielle Top 100)	40
Hungarian Albums (MAHASZ)	18
New Zealand Albums (RMNZ)	2
Polish Albums (ZPAV)	6
Swiss Albums (Schweizer Hitparade)	37
US Billboard 200	8
US Soundtracks (Billboard)	1

== Certifications ==
Region	Certification	Certified units/sales
Australia (ARIA)	Platinum	70,000^{^}
Germany (BVMI)	Gold	100,000^{^}
New Zealand (RMNZ)	Platinum	15,000^{^}
Poland (ZPAV)	Platinum	70,000^{*}
Russia (NFPF)	Gold	10,000^{*}
United Kingdom (BPI)	Gold	100,000^{*}
United States (RIAA)	Platinum	1,000,000^{^}
^{*} Sales figures based on certification alone.^{^} Shipments figures based on certification alone.

== Accolades ==
Award	Category	Name	Result	Ref.
Academy Awards	Best Original Song	"Accidentally in Love" – Counting Crows	Nominated	
BMI Film & TV Awards	Most Performed Song from a Film	"Accidentally in Love" – Counting Crows	Won	
Broadcast Film Critics Association Award	Best Song	"Accidentally in Love" – Counting Crows	Nominated	
Gold Derby Awards	Best Original Song	"Accidentally in Love" – Counting Crows	Nominated	
Grammy Awards	Best Compilation Soundtrack Album for Motion Pictures, Television or Other Visual Media	Shrek 2 (Original Motion Picture Soundtrack) – Andrew Adamson, Christopher Douridas and Michael Ostin	Nominated	
Grammy Awards	Best Song	"Accidentally in Love" – David Bryson, Adam Duritz, David Immerglück, Matthew Malley and Dan Vickrey	Nominated	
World Soundtrack Awards	Best Original Song Written for Film	"Accidentally in Love" – Counting Crows	Nominated	
