= Monica Potter =

American actress (born 1971)

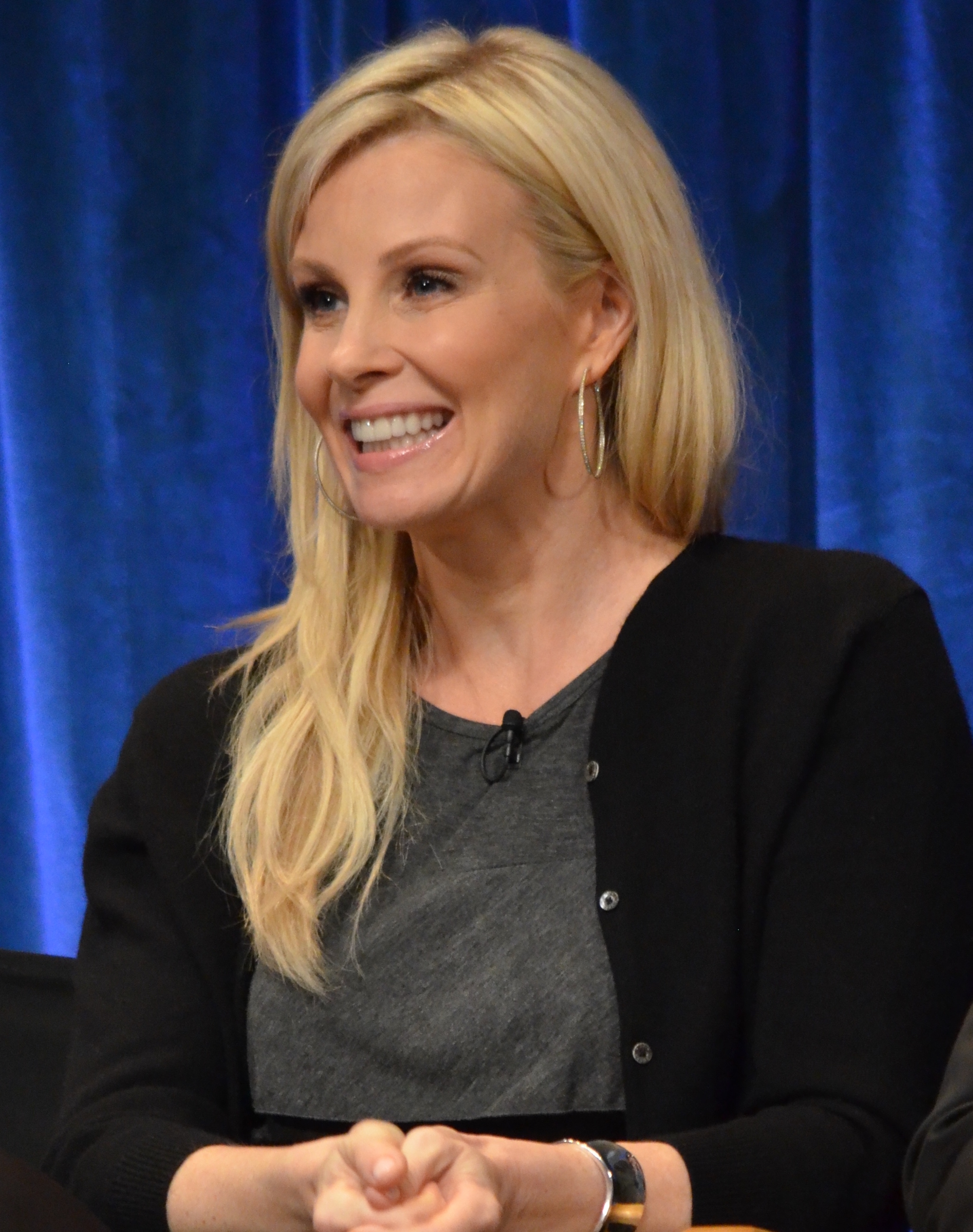
- Potter in 2013
- Born: June 30, 1971 (age 55); Cleveland, Ohio, U.S.
- Occupation: Actress
- Years active: 1993–present
- Spouses: Tom Potter (m. 1990; div. 1998) Daniel Christopher Allison (m. 2005; div. 2018)
- Children: 3

Monica Potter (born June 30, 1971) is an American actress. She is known for her starring roles in the films Con Air (1997), Patch Adams (1998), and Along Came a Spider (2001). She also appeared in the horror film, Saw (2004), and The Last House on the Left, a 2009 remake film.

Potter has also appeared on television, as a series regular on Boston Legal, as well as a Golden Globe-nominated role as Kristina Braverman in the NBC comedy-drama series Parenthood (2010–2015). She was a series regular in the CBS drama Wisdom of the Crowd.

Potter is also the founder and principal owner of Monica Potter Home, an upscale home goods, natural skin care and home decor business in Cleveland, Ohio. With the family business struggling to make money, the company was featured on the reality TV show, The Profit.

== Early life ==
Monica Potter's mother was a secretary in a hospital, and her father invented the first flame-resistant car wax. Potter has three sisters (Kerry, Jessica, and Brigette). Her maternal grandparents were Irish immigrants, and she was raised Catholic. As a child, Potter wanted to be a nun.

During her childhood she attended the Villa Angela Academy, and graduated from Euclid High School. She also spent part of her early years in Arab, Alabama. Potter had wanted to be an actress since childhood. She began acting at the Cleveland Play House when she was in elementary school. Starting at age 12, she worked at a flower shop, and later in her teens, she worked in a sub sandwich shop and did some modeling for newspaper and magazine ads and local commercials. After appearing in several commercials in Chicago, Potter relocated to Los Angeles in 1994. In 1995, she appeared in the Alan Jackson music video for "Tall, Tall Trees".

== Career ==
Potter made her screen debut in 1994, on CBS soap opera The Young and the Restless as Sharon Newman. In 1995, Potter was featured in the music video for the song "Tall, Tall Trees" by country artist Alan Jackson. She later appeared in several feature films, including Con Air (playing the wife of Nicolas Cage's character) and starring opposite Robin Williams in Patch Adams. In 1998, she played the love interest of doomed distance runner Steve Prefontaine in the movie Without Limits, and also appeared in the British comedy Martha, Meet Frank, Daniel and Laurence (1998). In 2001, she had two major roles, co-starring with Freddie Prinze, Jr. in Head Over Heels, and in the thriller Along Came a Spider with Morgan Freeman, based on the James Patterson best-seller.

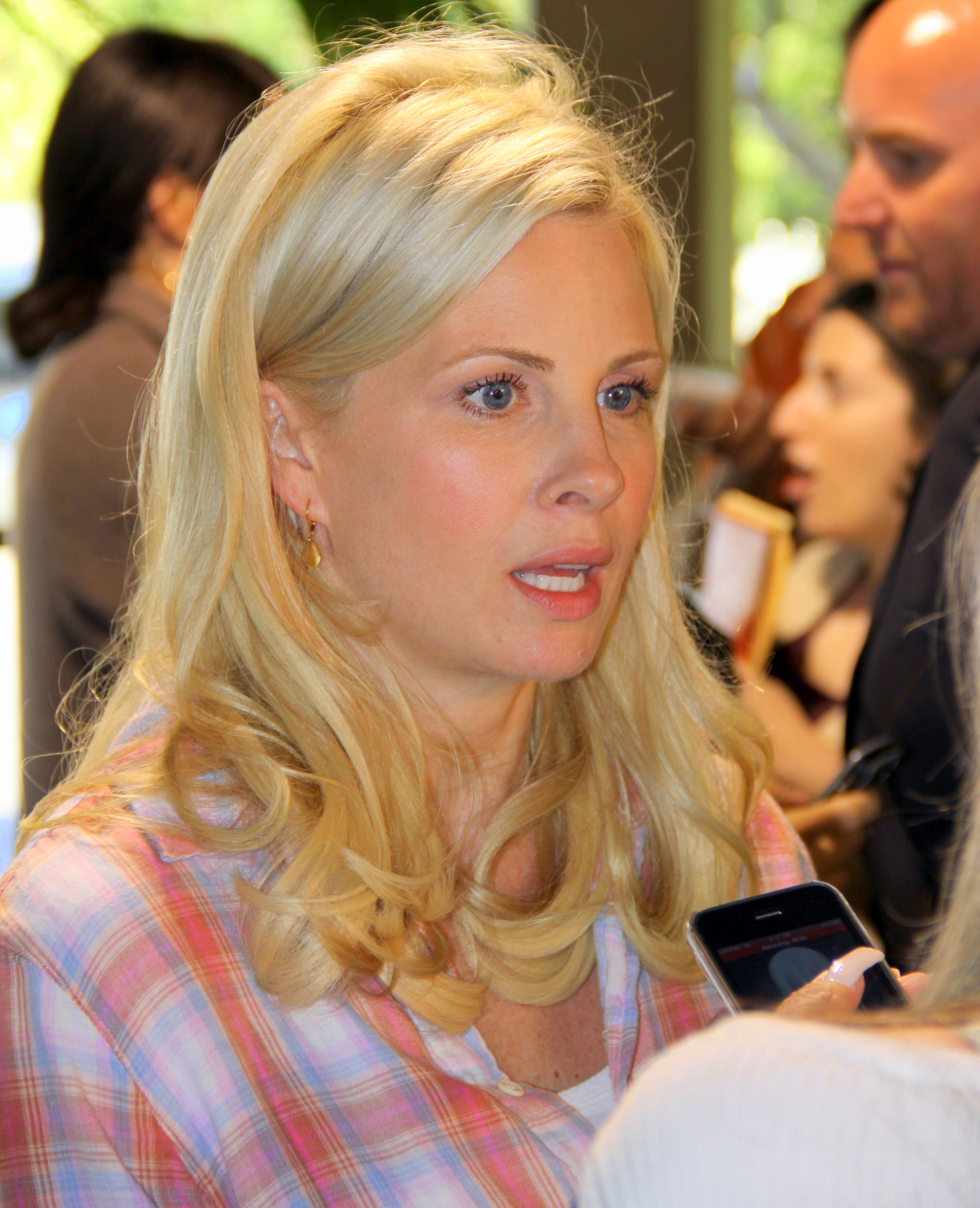
Potter in 2010

In 2004, Potter played the role of Alison Gordon in the first Saw film. Later Potter worked on television. She was a cast member of the ABC legal drama Boston Legal but left during the second season. In 2009, Potter became a cast member of the new TNT series Trust Me which was cancelled after the first season due to low ratings. In 2009, she had a lead role in the horror-thriller remake of Wes Craven's The Last House on the Left, opposite Tony Goldwyn.

Potter played the role of Kristina Braverman in the comedy-drama Parenthood, receiving critical acclaim for her performance in the fourth season. In 2013, she won the Critics' Choice Television Award for Best Drama Supporting Actress and was nominated for a Golden Globe Award for Best Supporting Actress – Series, Miniseries or Television Film for her role in the show.

In 2014, Potter created Monica Potter Home, an upscale home goods, natural skin care and home decor business in Cleveland, Ohio. The business began based on her skin care regimen that made use of Sea Buckthorn essential oils. Her father started using a balm, a natural product, on her when she was a young child because of her eczema. The business is a family affair; her mother and sisters work for her in the business. In 2017, with the business failing, she collaborated with Marcus Lemonis of CNBC's The Profit. She and her business appeared with her family and coworkers in episode 4 of the fifth season.

In 2015, Potter was joined by her mother and all three sisters on Celebrity Family Feud. The following year, she appeared in a HGTV reality series titled Welcome Back Potter, which chronicled the purchase and restoration of her childhood home in Cleveland, Ohio thirty years after the family sold it in 1987.

In 2016, Counting Crows frontman Adam Duritz confirmed that the band's song "Mrs. Potter's Lullaby", from the album This Desert Life (1999), was written about an imaginary version of her, as they had never met. Duritz explained that serendipity led to them meeting (for the first time) for a casual supper with industry friends the day the band was recording the song, and Potter returned to the studio with Duritz to watch them record. They became friends, and a tape he forgot he gave her on the night of the recording ended up salvaging the song, which the band felt they had ruined during post-production and had decided to not keep on the album.

== Personal life ==
Potter was married to Tom Potter from 1990 to 1998; together they have two sons. In 2005, Potter married Daniel Christopher Allison, an orthopedic surgeon. Potter and Allison have one daughter. In March 2015, Potter's husband joined the U.S. Navy Reserve as a physician, with the starting rank of Lieutenant Commander. In February 2018, the couple filed for divorce.

Potter's father died of cardiovascular disease in 2004.

== Filmography ==
=== Film ===
Year	Title	Role	Notes
1996	Bulletproof	Biker's Woman	
1997	Con Air	Tricia Poe	
1998	A Cool, Dry Place	Kate Durrell	
1998	Martha, Meet Frank, Daniel and Laurence	Martha	Alternative title: The Very Thought of You
1998	Without Limits	Mary Marckx	
1998	Patch Adams	Carin Fisher	
1999	Heaven or Vegas	Lilli	
2001	Head Over Heels	Amanda Pierce	
2001	Along Came a Spider	Secret Service Agent Jezzie Flannigan	
2002	I'm with Lucy	Lucy	
2004	Reversible Errors	Muriel Wynn	
2004	Saw	Alison Gordon	
2008	Lower Learning	Laura Buchwald	
2009	The Last House on the Left	Emma Collingwood	
2014	Lennon or McCartney	Herself	Short documentary film; interview clip
2024	The Girl in the Pool	Kristen	
2024	Running on Empty	Elaine	

=== Television ===
Year	Title	Role	Notes
1993	Nubeluz	Dalina	TV pilot for English version of Peruvian TV Children's show.
1994	The Young and the Restless	Sharon Newman #1	
2003	The Lunchbox Chronicles	Kate	"Pilot"
2004	Reversible Errors	Muriel Wynn	Miniseries
2004–2005	Boston Legal	Lori Colson	Main role Nominated - Screen Actors Guild Award for Outstanding Performance by an Ensemble in a Comedy Series (2005)
2007	Protect and Serve	Lizzie Borelli	"Pilot"
2009	Trust Me	Sarah Krajicek-Hunter	Main role
2010–2015	Parenthood	Kristina Braverman	Main role Critics' Choice Television Award for Best Drama Supporting Actress (2013); Nominated - Golden Globe Award for Best Supporting Actress - Series, Miniseries or Television Film (2013); Nominated - TCA Award for Individual Achievement in Drama (2013)
2016	Welcome Back Potter	Herself	Six episodes
2017	Wisdom of the Crowd	Alex	Main role
2017	The Profit	Herself	1 Episode
2020–2021	Goliath	Christina Lukin	Seasons 3 & 4
2026	Law & Order: Special Victims Unit	Talia Fedorov	Season 27, episode 19
