= Say You'll Be Mine (Amy Grant song) =

1994 single by Amy Grant

Single by Amy Grant

from the album House of Love
- Released: October 10, 1994
- Studio: The Bennett House (Franklin, TN)
- Genre: Swingbeat
- Length: 4:04
- Label: A&M
- Songwriters: Amy Grant; Keith Thomas; Wayne Kirkpatrick
- Producer: Keith Thomas

Amy Grant singles chronology
"House of Love" (1994)	"Say You'll Be Mine" (1994)	"Big Yellow Taxi" (1995)

"Say You'll Be Mine" is a song by Christian music singer Amy Grant. It was released by A&M Records as the second single from her 11th studio album, House of Love (1994), in the United Kingdom in October 1994. Unlike the previous singles from House of Love, "Say You'll Be Mine" was not released in the United States. On her 2004 DVD release, Greatest Videos 1986-2004, Grant revealed that "Say You'll Be Mine" was planned as a US single but the label pulled its release at the last minute. On the UK Singles Chart, the song reached number 41.

== Critical reception ==
Pan-European magazine Music & Media described the song as a "swing-beat escapade". Alan Jones from Music Week wrote, "A cutesy pop confection, a shade too repetitious and lightweight to help her recapture lost ground."

== Music video ==
Grant recorded a music video for the song, which was aired in both the US and the UK. It was directed by German film director and producer Nico Beyer and filmed in Los Angeles. The original album version is available on the 2004 DVD Greatest Videos 1986-2004.

== Track listing ==
- UK CD single
1. "Say You'll Be Mine" (radio mix) (3:58)
2. "Life's Gonna Change" (3:46)
3. "Say You'll Be Mine" (album version) (4:04)
4. Heart in Motion (Medley mix) (6:06)

== Personnel ==
- Amy Grant – lead and backing vocals
- Keith Thomas – acoustic piano, synthesizers, bass programming
- Dann Huff – electric guitars
- Mark Hammond – drum programming
- Ada Dyer – backing vocals
- Judson Spence – backing vocals
- Audrey Wheeler – backing vocals
- Martyn Phillips – remix

== Charts ==
Chart (1994)	Peak position
Scotland Singles (OCC)	42
UK Singles (OCC)	41
UK Airplay (Music Week)	39
