= Say You'll Be Mine =

Say You'll Be Mine may refer to:

- "Say You'll Be Mine" (Christopher Cross song), 1980
- "Say You'll Be Mine" (Amy Grant song), 1994
- "Say You'll Be Mine" (Steps song), 1999
- "Say You'll be Mine", a 2008 song by Kitty, Daisy & Lewis

== See also ==
- Say Forever You'll Be Mine, 1975 duet album by Porter Wagoner and Dolly Parton, and the title track from the album
