= Happiness (Vanessa Williams song) =

Single by Vanessa Williams

from the album Next
- Released: July 24, 1997
- Recorded: 1997
- Studio: Flyte Tyme Studios (Edina, MN)
- Genre: R&B; hip hop soul
- Length: 4:27
- Label: Mercury
- Songwriters: James Harris III, Terry Lewis; John Smith
- Producers: Jimmy Jam and Terry Lewis

Vanessa Williams singles chronology
"Do You Hear What I Hear? / The Little Drummer Boy" (1996)	"Happiness" (1997)	"First Thing on Your Mind" (1997)

Music video
- "Vanessa Williams - Happiness" on YouTube

"Happiness" is a song by American singer and actress Vanessa Williams, released as the first single from her fifth studio album, Next (1997). Written and produced by Jimmy Jam and Terry Lewis and released through Mercury Records in July 1997, it reached number 25 on the US Billboard Adult R&B Airplay Chart, number 23 on the Mainstream R&B/Hip-Hop Airplay chart, and number 38 on the R&B/Hip-Hop Airplay. It also reached number 49 on the New Zealand Singles Chart. The song samples from Nu Shooz's "I Can't Wait" and Funkadelic's "(Not Just) Knee Deep".

== Critical reception ==
Larry Flick from Billboard magazine wrote "Vanessa getsdown and funky on this peek into Next, a project that has the juice to push her backto the top of da pops. Bolstered by thekind of finger-poppin' pop/soul groove that producers Jimmy Jam and Terry Lewis [..] Williams delivers a performance that is, by turns, playful and sophisticated. After last year's credible but underappreciated foray into jazz, she's back on the street-and sheappears to be doing it on her own terms. Good for her. She should be rewarded by the ardor of popsters who are starved for something sweet to eat."

== Music video ==
An accompanying music video directed by Francis Lawrence was released, and shows Williams singing and dancing across different areas of a mansion.

== Track listing and formats ==
- US CD single
1. "Happiness" (Radio Edit) – 3:55
2. "Happiness" (Morales Def Club Mix) – 7:36
3. "Happiness" (Morales Dubiness Mix) – 7:38
4. "Happiness" (Album Version) – 4:27
- Japanese Maxi single
1. "Happiness" (Album Verson) – 4:27
2. "First Thing On Your Mind" (Album Version) – 3:57
3. "Happiness" (Radio Morales) – 3:22
4. "Happiness" (Dubiness Mix) – 7:38
- European CD single
1. "Happiness" (Radio Edit) – 3:55
2. "Happiness" (Radio Morales) – 3:22
3. "Happiness" (Morales Def Club Mix) – 7:36
4. "Happiness" (Morales Dubiness Mix) – 7:38
5. "Happiness" (Darkchild Remix With Rap) – 4:20
6. "Happiness" (Darkchild Remix No Rap) – 4:20
7. "Happiness" (Darkchild Beat Mix) – 4:20
8. "Happiness" (Redbull Dance Hall Mix) – 2:54

== Charts ==
Chart (1997)	Peak position
Canada Top Singles (RPM)	70
New Zealand (Recorded Music NZ)	49
US Adult R&B Songs (Billboard)	25
US R&B/Hip-Hop Airplay (Billboard)	38
