= Martha, Meet Frank, Daniel and Laurence =

- Promotional poster
- Directed by: Nick Hamm
- Written by: Peter Morgan
- Produced by: Grainne Marmion
- Starring: Monica Potter; Rufus Sewell; Tom Hollander; Joseph Fiennes; Ray Winstone
- Cinematography: David Johnson
- Edited by: Michael Bradsell
- Music by: Edward Shearmur
- Distributed by: FilmFour Distributors
- Release date: 8 May 1998 (UK)
- Running time: 88 minutes
- Country: United Kingdom
- Language: English
- Box office: $5.3 million

Martha, Meet Frank, Daniel and Laurence (released in the United States as The Very Thought of You) is a 1998 British romantic comedy directed by Nick Hamm and starring Monica Potter and Joseph Fiennes. The screenplay by Peter Morgan focuses on the chance meeting each of three childhood friends now living in London has with an American tourist.

== Plot ==
Fed up with her dead-end job with a Minneapolis car rental agency, Martha quits, cashes her final paycheck, and uses the money to purchase an airline ticket to the least expensive international destination she can find – London. At the airport, she meets Daniel, a successful music label executive, who covertly arranges for her to be upgraded to First Class and seated next to him on the flight. When she sells the ticket to another passenger and Daniel finds his seatmate is an obnoxiously loud woman instead of the girl of his dreams, he moves back to the Economy section and takes the vacant seat next to Martha. Before landing in London, he offers her the use of a deluxe suite in a luxury hotel at his company's expense in exchange for a lunch date the following day.

Through a series of flashbacks and flashforwards, we learn Laurence, a former bridge champion who now teaches the game to wealthy women, went to the airport to pick up Daniel but missed him because the flight landed early. Instead, he literally runs into Martha, who hits him with a luggage cart while searching for the exit. She coerces him into taking her into the city and invites him to the suite for dinner. While she is in the bathroom, a bouquet of flowers from Daniel is delivered to the suite, and when Laurence sees the attached card, he departs without explanation.

The following day, Martha meets struggling actor Frank, who has fled an audition in a panic and has gone to the park to console himself with a half-bottle of whiskey. Having heard about her from Daniel, he realises who she is and calls Laurence to boast that he is about to make her his conquest. He takes her to a nearby art gallery. Martha slips away and heads for the exit, where she reunites with Laurence, who was looking for the pair. He invites her back to his flat and she accepts.

Torn between loyalty to Daniel and love for Martha, Laurence seeks advice from Pederson, a neighbour he mistakenly believes is a psychiatrist, in the early morning hours. In the interim, Martha awakens and seeing a photograph of the three friends, assumes she has been the target of an elaborate practical joke. To get even, she separately invites each of the men to meet her for breakfast and when all three arrive, bearing floral arrangements of varying size, a brawl ensues. Laurence sees Martha running off in the distance but is unable to catch her. Despondent, he goes to a travel agency to purchase a ticket anywhere he can go for £99, which proves to be Reykjavík. At the airport gate, he is told he is being seated in First Class and when he boards the plane, he finds Martha waiting for him. She reveals she was responsible for the upgrade, a trick she learned from Daniel.

== Cast ==
- Monica Potter as Martha
- Joseph Fiennes as Laurence
- Tom Hollander as Daniel
- Rufus Sewell as Frank
- Ray Winstone as Pedersen

== Production ==
The film was shot on location in Minneapolis, at Stansted Airport in Essex, and at various London locations, including Battersea Park, Blakes Hotel in South Kensington, and South Bank.

The soundtrack includes "Halo" by Texas, "Brown Paper Bag" by Roni Size, "Fall in Love with Me" by Booth and the Bad Angel, "Fools Like Us" by Echo & the Bunnymen, "Tape Loop" by Morcheeba, and "I Only Want to Be with You" by Dusty Springfield.

== Reception ==
The film has a 40% critic approval on aggregate review site Rotten Tomatoes with an average score of 4.8/10, based on 10 reviews. Another review aggregator, Metacritic, which assigns a weighted mean rating out of 100 to reviews from mainstream critics, calculated an average score of 43, based on 10 reviews, considered to be "mixed or average reviews".

Stephen Holden of The New York Times called the film

...one of those coyly edited movies that fills in the mystifying gaps in its story by periodically doubling back to repeat a scene with new crucial information added... To maintain its fizz, a comedy like The Very Thought of You requires the spicy contemporary equivalent of Noël Coward banter. But if the story is a clever sitcomy contraption, the dialogue is pedestrian. Among the contestants for Martha's love, the only character with a distinctive personality is Hollander's vain, petulant Daniel, whose ego is in need of puncturing. As the shy, tongue-tied Laurence, who needs lessons in self-assertion, Fiennes lacks the debonair twinkle and the comic timing of Hugh Grant, who might have made the role come alive. As for Ms. Potter's Martha, the character is a fabrication that not even Ms. Roberts with all her wiles could have made believable.

Variety's Derek Elley wrote: "Lack of real chemistry between the leads and unsteady direction by Nick Hamm dampen an otherwise promising screenplay by Peter Morgan." He also called the film "in some respects a '90s version of Richard Lester's '60s comedy The Knack".

=== Box office ===
The film grossed £1.4 million ($2.3 million) in the United Kingdom and $3 million worldwide.

== Home media ==
The Region 1 DVD was released by Buena Vista Home Entertainment on 14 December 1999. The film is in anamorphic widescreen format with an audiotrack and subtitles in English. There are no bonus features. The Region 2 DVD was released on 7 June 2004.
