= She Don't Want Nobody Near =

Single by Counting Crows

from the album Films About Ghosts (The Best Of...)
- Released: October 20, 2003
- Genre: Rock
- Label: Geffen
- Songwriters: Jim Bogios, David Bryson, Adam Duritz, Charlie Gillingham, David Immerglück, Matt Malley, Brendan O'Brien, Dan Vickrey

Counting Crows singles chronology
"If I Could Give All My Love (Richard Manuel Is Dead)" (2003)	"She Don't Want Nobody Near" (2003)	"Accidentally in Love" (2004)

"She Don't Want Nobody Near" is a single by American rock band Counting Crows from their greatest hits album, Films About Ghosts (The Best Of...). The song bases itself around the double negative of the title, and is a song about a girl who wants people around her.

Adam Duritz has said: "It’s just about people who are uncomfortable in the company of other people and also tired of being alone and they are trying to juggle those two opposing feelings. They are trying to figure out how to live that way."

== Charts ==
=== Weekly charts ===
Chart (2004)	Peak position
US Adult Alternative Airplay (Billboard)	1
US Adult Pop Airplay (Billboard)	20

=== Year-end charts ===
Chart (2004)	Position
US Adult Top 40 (Billboard)	68
US Triple-A (Billboard)	14
