= Hard Candy (Counting Crows album) =

Studio album by Counting Crows
- Released: July 7, 2002
- Genres: Alternative rock, jangle pop
- Length: 59:30
- Label: Geffen
- Producer: Steve Lillywhite

Counting Crows chronology
This Desert Life (1999)	Hard Candy (2002)	Films About Ghosts (The Best Of...) (2003)

Singles from Hard Candy
- 1. "American Girls" Released: May 13, 2002; 2. "Miami" Released: July 9, 2002; 3. "Big Yellow Taxi" Released: November 11, 2002; 4. "If I Could Give All My Love (Richard Manuel Is Dead)" Released: June 16, 2003

Hard Candy is the fourth studio album by American rock band Counting Crows, released in the United Kingdom on July 7, 2002, and the following day in the United States.

The album features the hidden track "Big Yellow Taxi", a Joni Mitchell cover. This was one of their biggest radio hits from the album; re-releases were revised to mention the song. Originally the song did not include Vanessa Carlton and the standard version caught the ear of a producer who added it to the movie Two Weeks Notice adding Carlton's voice to the track. This version topped the VH-1 charts and American Top 40 for a while. A new version of the song "Holiday in Spain", recorded as a duet in English and Dutch with Dutch band BLØF, became a number-one hit in the Netherlands.

== Reception ==
Professional ratings
Aggregate scores
Source	Rating
Metacritic	69/100
Review scores
Source	Rating
AllMusic	4/5 stars
Blender	3/5 stars
Entertainment Weekly	B−
PopMatters	8/10 stars
Q	3/5 stars
Rolling Stone	3/5 stars
Spin	6/10
Stylus Magazine	D+
Uncut	3.5/5 stars
USA Today	3/4 stars

Reviews hailed the album as the best release from Counting Crows since their debut album August and Everything After (1993), with the albums of the mid-1990s being "long, and drawn out", likely due to lead singer Adam Duritz's state of mind at that time, one reviewer happily announced that, "Hard Candy is crisp and tight, packed with three- and four-minute shots of radio friendly fare", and that during a time when hard rock is the standard, the band are not afraid of a sound that is in the title track, compared to the Byrds, and with its "Allman-esque" twin guitars, echoes The Band in "If I Could Give All My Love (Richard Manuel Is Dead)". The album has received a score of 69 out of 100 based on "generally favorable reviews" from Metacritic.

However, the cover of Joni Mitchell's "Big Yellow Taxi" was met with searing criticism, with The Village Voice naming it the worst song of the 2000s:

Adam, we don't know if you misunderstood the song's anti-globalization, anti-industrialization, anti-corporation message, or just chose to ignore it so you could get free Frappucinos for life. But we're gonna hip you to a harsh reality. Seriously, you know the line about how they "paved paradise and put up a parking lot?" Like how they replaced something beautiful with something cold and heartless and commercial? That's you. You're the parking lot, motherfucker. You drove your shitty steamroller over something everyone loved so you could pander your sensitive pussyhound whine to people waiting in line at the Carl's Jr. They paved Nirvana and put up a Counting Crow. Argh!

Additionally, NME also included this cover on its list of the worst songs of the 2000s, and Ultimate Classic Rock highlighted this song in its Terrible Classic Rock Covers series.

== Track listing ==
All tracks written by Adam F. Duritz unless otherwise indicated. The song "Big Yellow Taxi" was written by Joni Mitchell, who is credited in the liner notes with the passage "May contain trace amounts of Joni Mitchell"

1. "Hard Candy" (Duritz, Daniel J. Vickrey, Charles Gillingham) – 4:20
2. "American Girls" – 4:32
3. "Good Time" – 4:24
4. "If I Could Give All My Love (Richard Manuel Is Dead)" (Duritz, Vickrey, David Immerglück, Gillingham, Matt Malley) – 3:52
5. "Goodnight L.A." – 4:17
6. "Butterfly in Reverse" (Duritz, Ryan Adams, Gillingham) – 2:48
7. "Miami" (Duritz, Gillingham, Immerglück) – 5:01
8. "New Frontier" – 3:51
9. "Carriage" – 4:04
10. "Black and Blue" – 3:53
11. "Why Should You Come When I Call?" (Duritz, Gillingham) – 4:38
12. "Up All Night (Frankie Miller Goes to Hollywood)" – 5:07
13. "Holiday in Spain" – 3:50
14. "Big Yellow Taxi" (Joni Mitchell) – 3:57 [Original issue hidden track]

2006 revised edition

14. "4 White Stallions" (Jeff Trott, Vickrey, Patrick Winningham) – 4:21
15. "Big Yellow Taxi" (Single Version, featuring Vanessa Carlton) (Mitchell) – 3:47

United Kingdom release

14. "4 White Stallions" (Trott, Vickery, Winningham) – 4:21
15. "You Ain't Going Nowhere" (Bob Dylan) – 8:43
16. "Big Yellow Taxi" (Mitchell) – 3:57 [Original issue hidden track]

United Kingdom 2003 re-release

14. "4 White Stallions" (Trott, Vickery, Winningham) – 4:21
15. "You Ain't Going Nowhere" (Dylan) – 3:44
16. "Big Yellow Taxi" (Single Version, featuring Vanessa Carlton) (Mitchell) – 3:47

Japanese release

14. "4 White Stallions" (Trott, Vickrey, Winningham) – 4:21
15. "You Ain't Going Nowhere" (Bob Dylan) – 3:44
16. "Start Again" (Norman Blake) – 3:34
17. "Big Yellow Taxi" (Mitchell) – 3:57 [Original issue hidden track]

Japanese 2003 re-release

14. "4 White Stallions" (Trott, Vickrey, Winningham) – 4:21
15. "You Ain't Going Nowhere" (Dylan) – 3:44
16. "Start Again" (Blake) – 3:34
17. "Big Yellow Taxi" (Single Version, featuring Vanessa Carlton) (Mitchell) – 3:47

== Personnel ==
Counting Crows

- Dave Bryson – acoustic guitar, electric guitar
- Adam Duritz – piano, vocals, horn arrangements, string arrangements, string samples
- Charlie Gillingham – synthesizer, piano, oboe, Hammond organ, Mellotron, Omnichord, Fender Rhodes, horn arrangements, string arrangements, Wurlitzer, tack piano, vocals
- David Immerglück – acoustic guitar, bass, mandolin, electric guitar, vocals, slide guitar, electric sitar
- Matt Malley – bass, vocals, upright bass
- Ben Mize – drums, percussion, vocals, drum loops
- Dan Vickrey – acoustic guitar, banjo, electric guitar, vocals

Additional musicians

- Ryan Adams – backing vocalist on "Butterfly In Reverse"
- Vanessa Carlton – backing vocalist on "Big Yellow Taxi"
- Sheryl Crow – backing vocalist on "American Girls"
- Dave Gibbs – backing vocalist on "Hard Candy"
- Leona Naess – backing vocalist on "Black and Blue"
- Matthew Sweet – backing vocalist on "Hard Candy"
- Carole Castillo – viola
- Jacqueline Brand – violin
- Mario deLeon – violin
- Brian Dembow – viola
- Stephen Erdody – cello
- Ron Fair – string arrangements
- Richard Feves – bass
- Alan Grunfeld – violin
- Jerry Hey – flugelhorn, horn arrangements, string arrangements
- Paula Hochhalter – cello
- Ethan Johns – conga
- Karen Jones – violin
- Natalie Leggett – violin
- Alan Mautner – violin
- Ed Meares – bass
- Ralph Morrison – violin
- Robin Olson – violin
- Sara Parkins – violin
- Katia Popov – violin
- John Scanlon – viola
- Tina Soule – cello
- Cecilia Tsan – cello
- Josephina Vergara – violin

== Charts ==
=== Weekly charts ===
Chart (2002)	Peak position
Australian Albums (ARIA)	13
Austrian Albums (Ö3 Austria)	42
Belgian Albums (Ultratop Flanders)	14
Danish Albums (Hitlisten)	20
Dutch Albums (Album Top 100)	10
French Albums (SNEP)	126
German Albums (Offizielle Top 100)	28
Irish Albums (IRMA)	4
Italian Albums (FIMI)	49
New Zealand Albums (RMNZ)	15
Norwegian Albums (VG-lista)	16
Scottish Albums (Official Charts)	5
Swedish Albums (Sverigetopplistan)	19
Swiss Albums (Schweizer Hitparade)	39
UK Albums (Official Charts)	9
US Billboard 200	5

=== Year-end charts ===
Chart (2002)	Position
Canadian Alternative Albums (Nielsen SoundScan)	78
Dutch Albums (Album Top 100)	83
US Billboard 200	170

Chart (2003)	Position
Dutch Albums (Album Top 100)	95

== Certifications ==
Region	Certification	Certified units/sales
Australia (ARIA)	Gold	35,000^{^}
New Zealand (RMNZ)	Gold	7,500^{^}
United Kingdom (BPI)	Gold	152,990
United States (RIAA)	Gold	711,000
^{^} Shipments figures based on certification alone.
