= The Fantastic All-Electric Music Movie =

The Fantastic All-Electric Music Movie, also known as John Wilson's Mini Musicals, is an anthology of short animated music videos which were originally created by John Wilson for The Sonny and Cher Show during the early to mid-1970s.

The film was released on home video in 1981 by Video Gems under license from Fine Arts Films, an animation company founded by John Wilson in 1955. As well as the sixteen animated music videos from the show, the film includes an animated short based on Igor Stravinski's Petrushka.

== Starring musical voices ==
- Joni Mitchell
- Helen Reddy
- Jim Croce
- Coven
- Cher
- Sonny and Cher
- Sonny Bono
- Melanie
- Wayne Carpenter (Kinks)
- Stan Kenton's Big Band Latin Rhythm

== Songs featured ==
- "Big Yellow Taxi"
- "Angie Baby"
- "Both Sides Now"
- "Bad, Bad Leroy Brown"
- "One Tin Soldier"
- "Dark Lady"
- "Say, Has Anybody Seen My Sweet Gypsy Rose"
- "The Candy Man"
- "A Cowboy's Work Is Never Done"
- "Brand New Key"
- "Black and White"
- "Demon Alcohol"
- "Higher Ground"
- "You and Me (Babe)"
- "Reachin'"
- "Congo Valentine"

== Content description ==
Animator John Wilson produced animated music video shorts for original songs and covers of original songs sung by Sonny Bono and Cher. The songs "Big Yellow Taxi" and "Both Sides Now" are sung by Joni Mitchell. "Higher Ground" is covered by Sonny and Cher. "Angie Baby" is performed by Helen Reddy.

The animated music video for Joni Mitchell's Both Sides Now utilizes ground-breaking computer animation.

== Distribution ==
Television: CBS TV Sonny and Cher Show 1973-77 Home Video: Video Gems 1981 VHS
