= Big Yellow Taxi =

1970 single by Joni Mitchell

- Side A of 1970 Canadian single

Single by Joni Mitchell

from the album Ladies of the Canyon
- B-side: "Woodstock"
- Released: April 1970
- Recorded: 1970
- Studio: A&M (Hollywood, California)
- Genre: Folk rock; pop; folk
- Length: 2:16
- Label: Reprise
- Songwriter: Joni Mitchell
- Producer: Joni Mitchell

Joni Mitchell singles chronology
"Chelsea Morning" (1969)	"Big Yellow Taxi" (1970)	"Carey" (1971)

Lyric video
- "Big Yellow Taxi" on YouTube

"Big Yellow Taxi" is a song written, composed, and originally recorded by Canadian singer-songwriter Joni Mitchell in 1970, and originally released on her third album, Ladies of the Canyon (1970). Released in April 1970 by Reprise Records, the single was a hit in her native Canada (No. 15) as well as Australia (No. 6) and on the UK Singles Chart (No. 11). It only reached No. 67 on the US Billboard Hot 100 in 1970, but was later a bigger hit there for her in a live version released in 1974, which peaked at No. 24. Charting versions have also been recorded by the Neighborhood (who had the original top US 40 hit with the track in 1970, peaking at No. 29), and most notably by Amy Grant in 1995 and Counting Crows and Vanessa Carlton in 2002. The song was also sampled in Janet Jackson's "Got 'til It's Gone" (1997).

== Mitchell's composition and recording ==
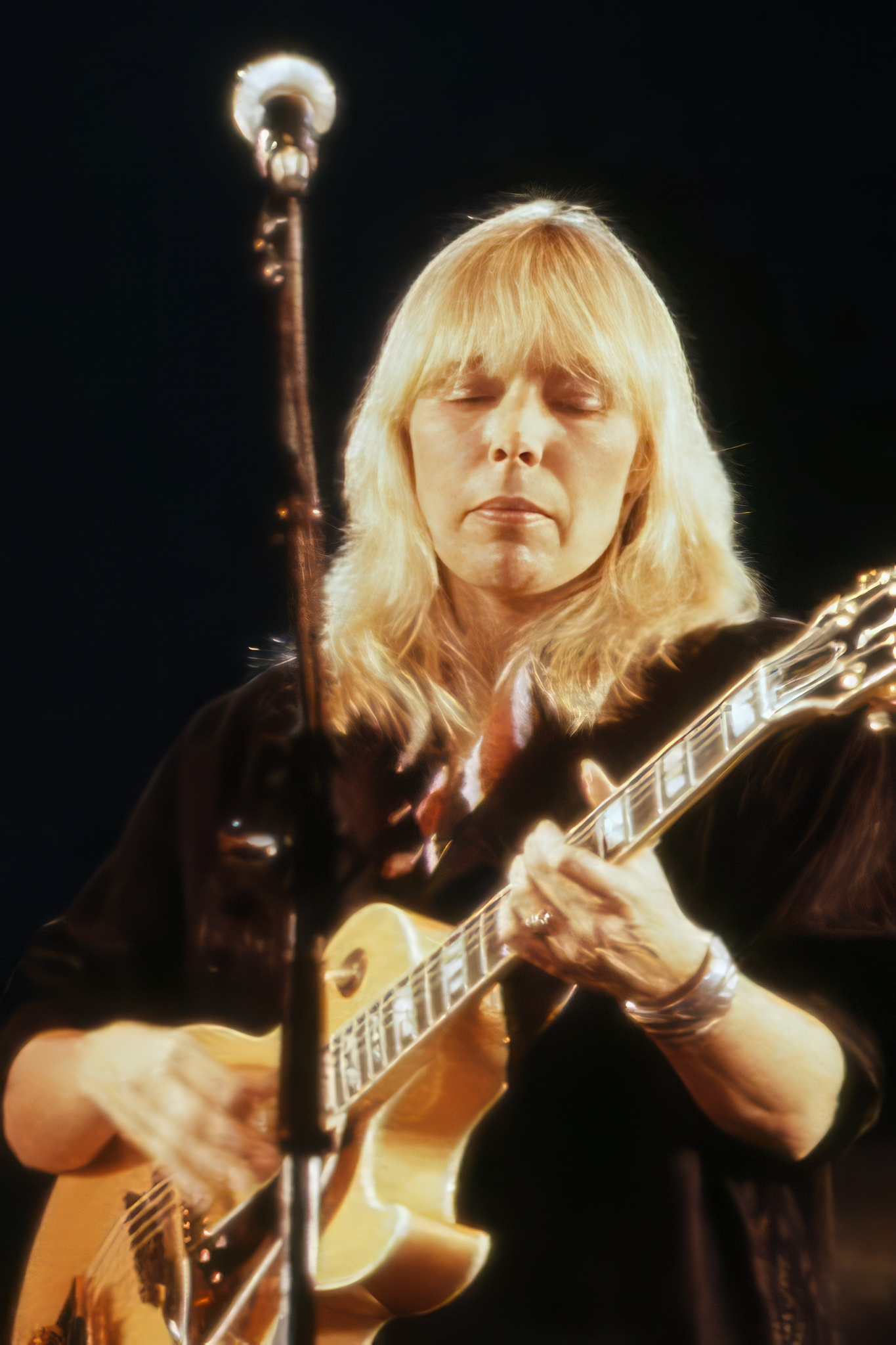
Joni Mitchell (pictured in 1983) wrote and recorded the song "Big Yellow Taxi".

In 1996, speaking to journalist Robert Hilburn, Joni Mitchell said this about writing the song:

I wrote 'Big Yellow Taxi' on my first trip to Hawaii. I took a taxi to the hotel and when I woke up the next morning, I threw back the curtains and saw these beautiful green mountains in the distance. Then, I looked down and there was a parking lot as far as the eye could see, and it broke my heart […] this blight on paradise. That's when I sat down and wrote the song.

The song is known for its environmental concern: "They paved paradise to put up a parking lot" and "Hey farmer, farmer, put away that DDT now". The line "They took all the trees, and put 'em in a tree museum / And charged the people a dollar and a half just to see 'em" refers to Foster Botanical Garden in downtown Honolulu, which is a living museum of tropical plants, some rare and endangered.

In the song's final verse, the political gives way to the personal. Mitchell recounts the departure of her "old man" in the eponymous "big yellow taxi", which may refer to the old Metro Toronto Police patrol cars, which until 1986 were painted yellow. In many covers the departed one may be interpreted as variously a boyfriend, a husband or a father.

Mitchell's original recording was first released as a single and then included on her 1970 album Ladies of the Canyon. A later live version was released in 1974 (1975 in France and Spain) on Miles of Aisles and reached No. 24 on the U.S. Billboard Hot 100 chart. Billboard regarded the live version as "more full of life" than any of the singles Mitchell released in a long time. Cash Box called the live version "a great rendition of this excellent lyrical song."

In 1995, to coincide with the song's inclusion in the American sitcom Friends, the song was rereleased as a maxi-single with new remixes in a variety of styles.

The song still receives significant airplay in Canada; in 2005, it was voted No. 9 on CBC's list of the top 50 essential Canadian tracks.

In 2007, Joni Mitchell released the album Shine, which includes a newly recorded, rearranged version of the song.

== Music video ==
An animated music video of Joni Mitchell's "Big Yellow Taxi" was produced by John Wilson of Fine Arts Films as an animated short for The Sonny & Cher Comedy Hour television show in the mid-1970s. The only commercial release of this full-length music video was in the Video Gems home video release on VHS titled John Wilson's Mini Musicals, also released as The Fantastic All-Electric Music Movie. The home video also contains an animated music video of Mitchell's song "Both Sides, Now".

== Track listing ==
- 1995 maxi-single
1. "Big Yellow Taxi" (Radio Mix)
2. "Big Yellow Taxi" (Friends Album Version)
3. "Big Yellow Taxi" (Late Night Club Mix)
4. "Big Yellow Taxi" (N.Y. Cab To Club Mix)
5. "Big Yellow Taxi" (Double Espresso NRG Mix)
6. "Big Yellow Taxi" (Tribal Dub)
7. "Big Yellow Taxi" (Original A Cappella with Guitar)

== Charts ==
1970 weekly chart performance for "Big Yellow Taxi"
Chart (1970)	Peak position
Australia (Kent Music Report)	6
Canada Top Singles (RPM)	15
Netherlands (Dutch Top 40)	27
Netherlands (Single Top 100)	19
UK Singles (OCC)	11
US Billboard Hot 100	67
US Easy Listening (Billboard)	33
US Cash Box Top 100	100

1974–1975 weekly chart performance for "Big Yellow Taxi (Live)"
Chart (1974–1975)	Peak position
US Billboard Hot 100	24
US Easy Listening (Billboard)	27
US Cash Box Top 100	25

1996 weekly chart performance for "Big Yellow Taxi"
Chart (1996)	Peak position
US Dance Club Play (Billboard)	39

== Certifications ==
Certifications for "Big Yellow Taxi"
Region	Certification	Certified units/sales
Canada (Music Canada)	Platinum	80,000^{‡}
New Zealand (RMNZ)	Platinum	30,000^{‡}
United Kingdom (BPI)	Gold	400,000^{‡}
^{‡} Sales+streaming figures based on certification alone.

== Amy Grant version ==
"Big Yellow Taxi"
- Artwork for US and Australian single

Single by Amy Grant

from the album House of Love
- Released: March 1995
- Length: 3:01
- Label: A&M
- Songwriter: Joni Mitchell
- Producer: Michael Omartian

Amy Grant singles chronology
"Say You'll Be Mine" (1994)	"Big Yellow Taxi" (1995)	"Oh How the Years Go By" (1995)

Music video
- "Big Yellow Taxi" on YouTube

In 1995, American singer-songwriter Amy Grant released a cover of "Big Yellow Taxi" to pop and adult contemporary radio in the United States and United Kingdom. The song was released by A&M Records as the fourth (third in the US) pop radio single from her eleventh album House of Love (1994). Grant's version featured slightly altered lyrics, which she changed at Joni Mitchell's request.

The cover peaked at No. 67 on the US Billboard Hot 100, No. 25 in Canada, No. 20 on the UK Singles Chart, and No. 4 in Iceland. Grant also released a music video for the single, which was aired in the US and UK and released to home video on Grant's Greatest Videos 1986-2004 DVD. Grant also performed the song for her 2006 concert album, Time Again... Amy Grant Live.

=== Critical reception ===
A reviewer from Music & Media wrote, "Grant takes the cab that's been driven by Joni Mitchell before. Acoustic guitar and mainly mandolin give the single a far more intimate ambience than many of its more straight pop forerunners."

=== Track listings ===
- US CD single
1. "Big Yellow Taxi" (Paradise Mix) (3:08)
2. "Big Yellow Taxi" (Alternative Paradise Mix) (3:04)
3. "Politics of Kissing" (4:18)
4. Heart in Motion Medley Mix (6:08)
- UK CD single
1. "Big Yellow Taxi" (Paradise Mix) (3:06)
2. "House of Love" (South Street Mix) (4:39)
3. "Every Heartbeat" (Piano Mix) (3:31)
4. "Lucky One" (4:10)

=== Charts ===
==== Weekly charts ====
Weekly chart performance for Amy Grant's version of "Big Yellow Taxi"
Chart (1995)	Peak position
Australia (ARIA)	156
Canada Top Singles (RPM)	25
Canada Adult Contemporary (RPM)	4
Europe (Eurochart Hot 100)	67
Europe (European Hit Radio)	27
Iceland (Íslenski Listinn Topp 40)	4
Scottish Singles Sales (Official Charts)	17
UK Singles (Official Charts)	20
US Billboard Hot 100	67
US Adult Contemporary (Billboard)	18
US Adult Pop Airplay (Billboard)	28

==== Year-end charts ====
Year-end chart performance for Amy Grant's version of "Big Yellow Taxi"
Chart (1995)	Position
Canada Adult Contemporary (RPM)	47
Iceland (Íslenski Listinn Topp 40)	96
US Adult Contemporary (Billboard)	38

=== Release history ===
Release dates and formats for Amy Grant's version of "Big Yellow Taxi"
Region	Date	Format(s)	Label(s)	Ref.
United States	March 1995	—N/a	A&M	
United Kingdom	June 12, 1995	7-inch vinyl; CD; cassette	A&M	
United States	July 18, 1995	Contemporary hit radio	A&M	
Australia	July 31, 1995	CD; cassette	A&M	

== Counting Crows and Vanessa Carlton version ==
"Big Yellow Taxi"

Single by Counting Crows featuring Vanessa Carlton

from the album Hard Candy
- Released: November 11, 2002
- Genre: Pop rock
- Length: 3:47
- Label: Geffen
- Songwriter: Joni Mitchell
- Producer: Steve Lilywhite

Counting Crows singles chronology
"Miami" (2002)	"Big Yellow Taxi" (2002)	"If I Could Give All My Love (Richard Manuel Is Dead)" (2003)

Vanessa Carlton singles chronology
"Ordinary Day" (2002)	"Big Yellow Taxi" (2002)	"Pretty Baby" (2002)

Music video
- "Big Yellow Taxi" on YouTube

In 2002, American rock band Counting Crows covered "Big Yellow Taxi" with backing vocals by American singer-songwriter Vanessa Carlton. It was included on the soundtrack to the film Two Weeks Notice, starring Sandra Bullock and Hugh Grant. Originally, the song was a hidden track on the band's 2002 album Hard Candy, and it did not include Carlton until it was to be featured in the film. New releases of the album included it as a track with her added, as with her in the video (which was shot on Coney Island, Brooklyn, and in nearby Bensonhurst), although Counting Crows and Carlton neither appeared in the video together nor recorded together. This version slightly changed Mitchell's original lyrics to describe when the eponymous taxi "took my girl away", instead of Mitchell's "took away my old man". The original version of the song without Carlton was included on the album Nolee Mix, which was released to promote the My Scene dolls.

This cover reached No. 42 on the US Billboard Hot 100 and entered the top five on three other Billboard listings. The song became the band's only top-20 single in the United Kingdom, peaking at No. 13, and it reached the top 10 in Australia, Ireland, and New Zealand. The single was certified gold by the Recording Industry Association of America (RIAA) and platinum by the Australian Recording Industry Association (ARIA).

=== Critical reception ===
The Village Voice named this cover the worst song of the 2000s, and the Village Voice's scathing review of the cover is archived on Joni Mitchell's website. The review derided the cover as having paved paradise (Mitchell's original song) and put up a parking lot.

Adam, we don't know if you misunderstood the song's anti-globalization, anti-industrialization, anti-corporation message, or just chose to ignore it so you could get free Frappucinos for life. But we're gonna hip you to a harsh reality. Seriously, you know the line about how they "paved paradise and put up a parking lot?" Like how they replaced something beautiful with something cold and heartless and commercial? That's you. You're the parking lot, motherfucker. You drove your shitty steamroller over something everyone loved so you could pander your sensitive pussyhound whine to people waiting in line at the Carl's Jr. They paved Nirvana and put up a Counting Crow. Argh!

Additionally, NME also included this cover on its list of the worst songs of the 2000s, and Ultimate Classic Rock highlighted this song in its Terrible Classic Rock Covers series. In April 2022, American Songwriter ranked "Big Yellow Taxi" at number 10 on their list of "The Top 10 Counting Crows Songs".

=== Music video ===
The music video for "Big Yellow Taxi" features the Counting Crows performing on a boardwalk in Coney Island, New York. Vanessa Carlton also walks around the streets and sings along to the song. Several people are shown looking back at mirages of past relationships or friendships that they regret losing. Meanwhile, a yellow taxi drives through the streets, calling the attention of the Crows, Carlton, and the former couples. The taxis are transporting mirage of themselves or their former significant other, with some trying to chase after it. The "big yellow taxi [that] took my old man/girl away". One former couple does in fact again meet face to face.

=== Track listing ===
Australasian CD single
No.	Title	Writer(s)	Length
1.	"Big Yellow Taxi" (featuring Vanessa Carlton)	Joni Mitchell	3:48
2.	"Big Yellow Taxi"	Mitchell	3:56
3.	"If I Could Give All My Love (Richard Manuel Is Dead)" (live and acoustic)	Adam Duritz	4:00
4.	"Hard Candy" (live and acoustic)	Duritz	3:41
5.	"Big Yellow Taxi" (enhanced video)

=== Charts ===
==== Weekly charts ====
Weekly chart performance for Counting Crows' version of "Big Yellow Taxi"
Chart (2003)	Peak position
Australia (ARIA)	3
Austria (Ö3 Austria Top 40)	40
Belgium (Ultratop 50 Flanders)	33
Canada CHR (Nielsen BDS)	12
Europe (Eurochart Hot 100)	43
European Radio Top 50 (Music & Media)	7
Germany (GfK)	67
Hungary (Rádiós Top 40)	7
Ireland (IRMA)	7
Latvia (Latvijas Top 40)	4
Netherlands (Dutch Top 40)	19
Netherlands (Single Top 100)	23
New Zealand (Recorded Music NZ)	4
Poland (PiF PaF)	21
Romania (Romanian Top 100)	23
Scottish Singles Sales (Official Charts)	10
Sweden (Sverigetopplistan)	55
Switzerland (Schweizer Hitparade)	63
UK Singles (Official Charts)	16
US Billboard Hot 100	42
US Adult Alternative Airplay (Billboard)	2
US Adult Contemporary (Billboard)	5
US Adult Pop Airplay (Billboard)	5
US Pop Airplay (Billboard)	30

==== Year-end charts ====
2003 year-end chart performance for Counting Crows' version of "Big Yellow Taxi"
Chart (2003)	Position
Australia (ARIA)	15
Ireland (IRMA)	52
Netherlands (Dutch Top 40)	93
New Zealand (RIANZ)	11
UK Singles (OCC)	183
US Adult Contemporary (Billboard)	13
US Adult Top 40 (Billboard)	9
US Triple-A (Billboard)	5

2004 year-end chart performance for Counting Crows' version of "Big Yellow Taxi"
Chart (2004)	Position
US Adult Contemporary (Billboard)	16

=== Certifications ===
Certifications for Counting Crows' version of "Big Yellow Taxi"
Region	Certification	Certified units/sales
Australia (ARIA)	Platinum	70,000^{^}
New Zealand (RMNZ)	2× Platinum	60,000^{‡}
United Kingdom (BPI)	Silver	200,000^{‡}
United States (RIAA)	Gold	500,000^{*}
^{*} Sales figures based on certification alone.^{^} Shipments figures based on certification alone.^{‡} Sales+streaming figures based on certification alone.

=== Release history ===
Release dates and formats for Counting Crows' version of "Big Yellow Taxi"
Region	Date	Format(s)	Label(s)	Ref.
United States	November 11, 2002	Hot adult contemporary radio	Geffen	
Australia	January 13, 2003	CD	Geffen	
United States	January 13, 2003	Triple A radio	Geffen	
United States	February 3, 2003	Contemporary hit radio	Geffen	
United Kingdom	February 3, 2003	CD; cassette	Geffen	

== Other versions ==
According to Mitchell's official website, "'Big Yellow Taxi' has been recorded by 627 other artists" as of October 12, 2026. Some other versions include:

- A single version by Chicago band the Neighborhood reached the Billboard top 40 (No. 29) in the summer of 1970. It also peaked at number 19 in Australia.
- Lyrics from this song are referenced in the Manfred Mann's Earth Band song "Lies (Through the 80s)" from the 1980 album Chance where in the chorus they sing "Pull up the trees and put up a parking lot".
- Joe Dassin covered the song on his self-titled fourth studio album, released in 1970, as "Le Grand Parking". The lyrics were translated to French by Claude Lemesle.
- A cover of the song was featured on the 1973 album Dylan by Bob Dylan. It received unfavorable critical reception.
- Punk band Pinhead Gunpowder covered the song on their 1992 EP Fahizah.
- In 1996, "Big Yellow Taxi (Traffic Jam Mix)" peaked on the U.S. Dance chart at No. 39 and was part of the soundtrack album to Friends: Music from the TV Series.
- The song is sampled in “Got ’til It’s Gone”, from Janet Jackson’s 1997 album The Velvet Rope.
- A cover of the song was featured on the 2001 album Big Wide Grin by Keb' Mo'.
- This song is sampled by Labrinth in the song "Sundown", from his 2012 debut album Electronic Earth.

== Real world ==
The Joni Mitchell Cup initiated by Club Captain Barry Thomas - co- winners Kevin Dunn and Regan Miles.

On the last day of 2024 The "Big Yellow Taxi" was referenced on the final day of the full Miramar, 18 hole, championship golf course in Wellington New Zealand when the club held a special and sad final competition called "The Joni Mitchell Cup." The adjacent international airport had compulsorily acquired the back nine holes so it could build a new carpark.
