= Star Bright (Vanessa Williams album) =

1996 studio album by Vanessa Williams

Studio album by Vanessa Williams
- Released: November 5, 1996
- Studios: Clinton Recording Studios (New York, NY); Edison Studios (New York, NY); The Hit Factory (New York, NY)
- Genres: Christmas; R&B
- Length: 52:17
- Label: Mercury
- Producers: Gerry "The Gov" Brown; Bruce Carbone; Ron Von Arx

Vanessa Williams chronology
The Sweetest Days (1994)	Star Bright (1996)	Next (1997)

Singles from Star Bright
- 1. "Do You Hear What I Hear"/"The Little Drummer Boy" Released: October 22, 1996

Star Bright is the fourth studio album and first Christmas album by Vanessa Williams, released on November 5, 1996, on Mercury Records. It achieved success as one of the best-selling holiday albums of 1996 and '97. It peaked at #36 on the Billboard 200, #24 on the Top R&B/Hip-Hop Albums and #5 on the Top Holiday Albums. The album went on to be nominated for a 1998 Grammy Award for Best Pop/Contemporary Gospel Album and was certified gold by the RIAA for sales of over 500,000 copies.

Although no official singles were released from the album, "Do You Hear What I Hear/The Little Drummer Boy" reached #15 on the Hot Adult Contemporary Tracks chart. A video was shot in 1993 for "What Child Is This?" that was originally featured on the A&M Records Christmas compilation A Very Special Christmas 2. The album was re-released in 2003 as The Christmas Collection: 20th Century Masters: The Best of Vanessa Williams.

== Critical reception ==
Professional ratings
Review scores
Source	Rating
AllMusic	4/5 stars
Entertainment Weekly	B−

Entertainment Weekly editor Chris felt that Williams "gets plenty of bonus points for good taste, starting with the actual cover of "Star Bright", which finds her striking a Julie Londonesque pose in a slinky evening dress that isn’t even red or green. The quiet orchestrations and modest interpretations she favors may be too careful [...] but compared with the overreachings of certain parties to be named shortly, a little subtlety goes a long way." Shawn M. Haney from AllMusic found that "Williams blends in the beauty of jazz, gospel, and soul music to create a portrait of Christmas songs. The record, entitled Star Bright, is genuinely filled with a glistening appeal, and the songs that it contains encompass a rich tapestry of the best and brightest seasonal music. The setting changes via each song, some tunes filled with Williams' rich voice backed by an assertive, charismatic gospel choir."

== Track listing ==
1. "Do You Hear What I Hear/The Little Drummer Boy" (K. Davis, Henry Onorati, Noel Regeny, Gloria Shayne, Harry Simeone, Traditional) - 5:02
2. "Star Bright" (Rob Mathes) - 3:37
3. "Hark! The Herald Angels Sing (Shout)" (Mathes, Felix Mendelssohn, Charles Wesley) - 5:34
4. "Baby, It's Cold Outside" (With Bobby Caldwell) (Frank Loesser) - 5:51
5. "I Wonder as I Wander" (Mathes) - 4:40
6. "Sleep Well, Little Children" (Alan Bergman, Leon Klatzkin) - 0:40
7. "Angels We Have Heard on High" (Traditional) - 4:58
8. "The First Noel" (William Sandys) - 4:28
9. "What Child Is This?" (William Chatterton Dix, Traditional) - 3:52
10. "Gracious Good Shepherd" (Mathes) - 4:15
11. "Go Tell It on the Mountain/Mary Had a Baby" (Public domain, Traditional) - 5:48
12. "I'll Be Home for Christmas" (Kim Gannon, Walter Kent, Buck Ram) - 3:32

== Charts ==
Weekly chart performance for Star Bright
Chart (1996)	Peak position
US Billboard 200	36
US Top Holiday Albums (Billboard)	5
US Top R&B/Hip-Hop Albums (Billboard)	24

== Certifications ==
Certifications for Star Bright
Region	Certification	Certified units/sales
United States (RIAA)	Gold	500,000^{^}
^{^} Shipments figures based on certification alone.
