= House of Love (Amy Grant song) =

1994 single by Amy Grant

Single by Amy Grant and Vince Gill

from the album House of Love
- Released: November 16, 1994
- Genre: Pop
- Length: 4:38
- Label: A&M
- Songwriters: Wally Wilson; Kenny Greenberg; Greg Barnhill
- Producer: Keith Thomas

Amy Grant singles chronology
"Lucky One" (1994)	"House of Love" (1994)	"Say You'll Be Mine" (1994)

Music video
- "House of Love" (Classic Philly Soul mix) on YouTube

Music video
- "Building the House of Love (link is for Part 1 of 8 only)" on YouTube

"House Of Love"

"House of Love" is a song by American Christian music singer Amy Grant, recorded as a duet with American country singer Vince Gill. It is written by Wally Wilson, Kenny Greenberg and Greg Barnhill, and produced by Keith Thomas. In the United States, it was released in November 1994 by A&M Records as the second single from her eleventh album House of Love (1994) and as the fourth and final single from the album in the United Kingdom.

== Background ==
After the success of her 1991 hit album, Heart in Motion, Amy Grant took time off from recording and touring. She conceived her third child in early 1992 and Sarah Cannon Chapman was born on October 11. That same month, Grant's second Christmas album, Home for Christmas, was released, spawning two singles, "Breath of Heaven" and "Grown-Up Christmas List".

Grant spent much of 1993 writing songs for her next album House of Love and recorded Songs from the Loft, a praise and worship album for teenagers, which won the Dove Award for Worship Album of the Year at 25th GMA Dove Awards in 1994. House of Love was completed soon thereafter, and the title track, a duet with country singer Vince Gill, was issued as its second single.

Two versions of the song were recorded: one produced by Keith Thomas and one produced by Michael Omartian. Only Thomas' was released on the album, although, Grant said, she initially considered putting both on the album. A snippet of Omartian's version, with a slightly more hip-hop lilt, can be heard in the documentary Building the House of Love, a video that documented the making of the album. Omartian's version was finally released on the 30th anniversary "expanded edition" of the album in 2024. The alternate versions on the maxi singles were remixes, not alternate recordings. Gill sang on both versions.

The song can also be heard over the closing credits of the Michael Keaton/Geena Davis romantic comedy Speechless.

== Critical reception ==
Larry Flick from Billboard magazine wrote, "Title cut from Grant's sweet, new album delights with friendly and inspirational lyrics and a delicious retro-soul musical demeanor. Gill adds an unobtrusive and meticulous tenor harmony, as well as a nimble funk guitar solo. Single has a bit more spice than the previous top 20 hit, 'Lucky One', and should bring even more programmers and consumers to the table."

== Chart performance ==
"House of Love" did not appear on the Christian radio charts, but it was successful on the US Billboard Adult Contemporary chart, peaking at number five. It also entered the top 40 of the Billboard Hot 100, where it reached number 37 and became a minor hit in the United Kingdom, peaking at number 46 on the UK singles chart. In Canada, the song became a top 10 hit, peaking at number nine on the RPM 100 Hit Tracks chart.

Notwithstanding its chart success, the remaining legacy of "House of Love" is that the recording sessions for the song are where Grant and Gill first spent meaningful time together and they soon became fast friends. Throughout the 1990s they remained so. Gill divorced his wife Janis Oliver in 1998, Grant divorced from her husband Gary Chapman in 1999 and Grant and Gill married a year later.

== Track listings ==
- US CD single
1. "House of Love" (The Classic Philly Soul mix)
2. "House of Love" (The South Street remix)
3. "House of Love" (LP version)
4. "Lucky One" (Kupper 12-inch mix)
- UK CD1
1. "House of Love" (radio mix)
2. "Baby Baby" (No Getting Over You mix)
3. "Good for Me"
4. "House of Love"
- UK CD2
1. "House of Love" (radio mix)
2. "Big Yellow Taxi" (Paradise mix)
3. "That's What Love Is For"
4. "Lead Me On"

== Charts ==
=== Weekly charts ===
Chart (1994–1995)	Peak position
Australia (ARIA)	109
Canada Top Singles (RPM)	9
Canada Adult Contemporary (RPM)	2
Iceland (Íslenski Listinn Topp 40)	20
UK Singles (Official Charts)	46
US Billboard Hot 100	37
US Adult Contemporary (Billboard)	5
US Adult Pop Airplay (Billboard)	31
US Cash Box Top 100	63

=== Year-end charts ===
Chart (1995)	Position
Canada Top Singles (RPM)	78
Canada Adult Contemporary (RPM)	17
US Adult Contemporary (Billboard)	8

== Release history ==
Region	Date	Format(s)	Label(s)	Ref.
Japan	November 16, 1994	Mini-CD	A&M	
Australia	November 28, 1994	CD; cassette	A&M; Polydor	
