= Lucky One (Amy Grant song) =

1994 single by Amy Grant

Single by Amy Grant

from the album House of Love
- Released: August 1, 1994
- Genre: Pop
- Length: 4:11
- Label: A&M
- Songwriters: Amy Grant; Keith Thomas
- Producer: Keith Thomas

Amy Grant singles chronology
"We Believe in God" (1993)	"Lucky One" (1994)	"House of Love" (1994)

Music video
- "Lucky One" on YouTube

"Lucky One" is a single by American Christian music singer Amy Grant. It was released in August 1994 by A&M Records as the first single from her 11th studio album, House of Love (1994). The song reached number two on the US Billboard Adult Contemporary chart and number 18 on the Billboard Hot 100, giving Grant her last top-20 hit in the United States. It also peaked at number four in Canada and reached the top 75 in Germany and the United Kingdom.

== Critical reception ==
Larry Flick from Billboard magazine wrote, "Grant previews her sweet new House of Love collection with a chugging pop ditty that will remind some of the massive 'Baby Baby'. However, this tune actually has its own unique and interesting melody and far more thoughtful lyrics. Grant's voice has rarely sounded this assured, which makes room for more creative phrasing and broader note reach. A thoroughly satisfying and heartwarming single from a most engaging artist." Pan-European magazine Music & Media described the song as "soft pop" in their review of the House of Love album.

== Track listings ==
- US CD single
1. "Lucky One" (remix)
2. "Lucky One" (The Lucky Street mix)
3. "Lucky One" (The A/C Rhythm mix)
4. "Lucky One" (Kupper radio)
5. "Good For Me" (7-inch Good for You mix)
- UK CD1
1. "Lucky One"
2. "Baby Baby" (No Getting Over You mix)
3. "Every Heartbeat" (7-inch Heart and Soul mix)
- UK CD2
1. "Lucky One"
2. "Lucky One" (remix)
3. "Lucky One" (The Lucky Street mix)
4. "Lucky One" (Martyn Phillips mix)

== Personnel ==
- Amy Grant – lead and backing vocals
- Keith Thomas – acoustic piano, synthesizers, bass programming, drum programming
- Scott Denté – acoustic guitar
- Will Owsley – acoustic guitar
- Jerry McPherson – electric guitars
- Tommy Sims – bass guitar
- Mark Hammond – drum programming
- Athena Cage – backing vocals
- Lisa Keith – backing vocals

== Charts ==
=== Weekly charts ===
Chart (1994)	Peak position
Australia (ARIA)	147
Canada Retail Singles (The Record)	12
Canada Top Singles (RPM)	4
Canada Adult Contemporary (RPM)	2
Germany (GfK)	56
Iceland (Íslenski Listinn Topp 40)	34
Scottish Singles Sales (Official Charts)	70
UK Singles (Official Charts)	60
US Billboard Hot 100	18
US Adult Contemporary (Billboard)	2
US Pop Airplay (Billboard)	16

=== Year-end charts ===
Chart (1994)	Position
Canada Top Singles (RPM)	43
Canada Adult Contemporary (RPM)	28
US Adult Contemporary (Billboard)	32

== Release history ==
Region	Date	Format(s)	Label(s)	Ref.
United Kingdom	August 1, 1994	7-inch vinyl; CD; cassette	A&M	
Japan	August 22, 1994	Mini-CD	A&M	
Australia	September 19, 1994	CD; cassette	A&M; Polydor	
