= Mrs. Potter's Lullaby =

2000 single by Counting Crows

Single by Counting Crows

from the album This Desert Life
- B-side: "All My Friends"
- Released: April 3, 2000
- Length: 7:46
- Label: DGC
- Songwriters: David Bryson; Adam Duritz; Charlie Gillingham; Matt Malley; Ben Mize; Dan Vickrey
- Producers: David Lowery; Dennis Herring

Counting Crows singles chronology
"Hanginaround" (1999)	"Mrs. Potter's Lullaby" (2000)	"All My Friends" (2000)

"Mrs. Potter's Lullaby" is a song by American rock band Counting Crows. It is the second track on their third album, This Desert Life (1999), and was released as its second single. The song reached number three on the US Billboard Triple-A chart and number 16 on the Canadian RPM Top 30 Rock Report. In April 2022, American Songwriter ranked the song at number three on their list of "The Top 10 Counting Crows Songs".

== Background ==
The band's frontman, Adam Duritz, has stated that the song was written about actress Monica Potter. Duritz, who has based other songs on real people, explained that this song was influenced by an imaginary version of the actress, based on seeing her onscreen in Con Air (1997) and Patch Adams (1998). They ended up meeting for the first time at dinner with entertainment industry friends on the day the band was recording the song, and Potter returned to the studio with Duritz to watch them work. At the end of the session, a production assistant gave Potter a recording of one of the takes. Afterwards, Duritz told Potter the song was being dropped because over production after the recording session had ruined it. She gave him her copy, which was the fourth of eight takes that had been recorded while she was in the studio. This version was subsequently added to the album.

== Charts ==
=== Weekly charts ===
Chart (2000)	Peak position
Canada Rock/Alternative (RPM)	16
US Adult Alternative Airplay (Billboard)	3
US Adult Pop Airplay (Billboard)	40

=== Year-end charts ===
Chart (2000)	Position
US Triple-A (Billboard)	11

== Release history ==
Region	Date	Format(s)	Label(s)	Ref(s).
United States	April 3, 2000	Adult contemporary; hot adult contemporary; modern adult contemporary radio	DGC	
United States	April 18, 2000	Contemporary hit radio	DGC	
