= John Greenhalgh =

John Greenhalgh may refer to:

- John Greenhalgh (governor) (died 1651), governor of the Isle of Man
- John Greenhalgh (footballer) (1898–1987), English footballer with Burnley and Accrington Stanley
- Jack Greenhalgh (trade unionist) (1908–1980), British trade union leader

== See also ==
- Jack Greenhalgh, American cinematographer
