= Keith Thomas (music producer) =

American record producer and songwriter

- Born: Brian Keith Thomas; Conyers, Georgia, U.S.
- Genres: R&B; pop; contemporary Christian music
- Occupations: Producer; songwriter

Brian Keith Thomas is an American record producer and songwriter from Franklin, Tennessee. He founded the record label and artist management company Levosia Entertainment in 2003. He has received two Grammy Awards from six nominations.

== Career ==
Born and raised in the Atlanta suburb of Conyers, Georgia, Thomas was singing lead for his father's gospel group by the age of 9. While still in high school, his ability as a keyboard player led him to recording sessions in the local Atlanta studios. Here, he came to the attention of country singer Ronnie Milsap.

Thomas moved to Nashville as Milsap's first staff writer for his publishing company, Ronjoy Music. Shortly thereafter, Thomas signed on with Word Records and began a seven-year tenure as their staff writer and producer. During this time, Thomas produced over 16 albums for various artists earning over 20 No. 1 singles.

Encouraged by this success, Thomas left Word and founded his own publishing and production company, Yellow Elephant Music, and began writing and producing music for BeBe and CeCe Winans. During their four album collaboration, the three sold over 3 million albums and had nine top 30 singles, six of which went top 10 and two of which went No. 1. As a result of this relationship, BeBe & CeCe Winans earned four Grammy Awards, a nomination, and five Dove Awards. In 1989, he collaborated once more with BeBe Winans, this time co-writing Takin' a Chance, a Japan-exclusive single from Whitney Houston's third album, "I'm Your Baby Tonight".

=== 1990s ===
In 1991, Thomas crossed over into the world of mainstream pop when he partnered with longtime friend and Christian contemporary musician Amy Grant to collect their first No. 1, Top 40 hit, "Baby Baby." Meanwhile, Thomas focused his music on former Miss America, soon to become global pop star and actress, Vanessa Williams. He produced five tracks on her Comfort Zone album including the No. 1 hit, "Save the Best for Last". These two No. 1 songs with Grant and Williams earned Thomas Grammy nominations for Producer of the Year, Song of the Year, and Record of the Year.

Responding to the momentum created by this success, Thomas owned The Bennett House recording studio in Franklin, Tennessee. Twenty minutes from downtown Nashville, The Bennett House not only accommodates Thomas' personal project studio and administrative offices but also offers outside clients a 19th-century recording environment that is unique in the Nashville music scene.

Christening the move into The Bennett House, Thomas gained his attention again to Amy Grant by writing and producing for her House of Love album. This album featured several hits for Thomas including the songs, "Lucky One," and the title track, "House of Love." Thomas produced the song "The Sweetest Days" for Vanessa Williams as well as records for James Ingram, Peabo Bryson, Deborah Cox, Regina Belle and Wendy Moten. In 1995, Thomas wrote and produced the hit song, "I Could Fall in Love," for Selena. Selena thus became the first artist to place both a Spanish- and an English-language song in the top 10 of the Hot Latin Tracks chart. "I Could Fall in Love" became the fifth best-charting song from that chart in 1995 and remained the highest-charting English-language song for two years, until Celine Dion's 1998 single "My Heart Will Go On" surpassed it when it peaked at number 1. The album, Dreaming of You, on which "I Could Fall in Love" appears, has now been certified 35x platinum. That year Thomas also produced Williams' Academy Award-winning single, "Colors of the Wind," for the multi-platinum selling motion picture soundtrack, Pocahontas.

In 1997, Thomas completed tracks for Grant's next album, Behind the Eyes and Williams' follow up album, Next. He also produced records for Michael Bolton, Luther Vandross, Brian McKnight, Tamia and Puff Johnson.

In early 1998, Thomas produced several songs for Williams and Jon Secada for the movie, Dance with Me. He also produced the track, "I Do (Cherish You)," for 98 Degrees' multi-platinum album on Universal Records, 98° and Rising. The song was also featured in the movie, Notting Hill, that starred Julia Roberts and Hugh Grant. In addition, Thomas was nominated for a Grammy for Producer of the Year for the 1998 Grammy awards.

In late 1998, Thomas served as the principal producer and co-executive producer for the soundtrack Touched by an Angel featuring songs inspired by the popular TV series. On this project, Thomas worked with Deana Carter, Amy Grant, Faith Hill, Uncle Sam and Wynonna.

Early in 1999, Thomas produced the track "Precious Wings" with actress/singer Tatyana Ali for the movie The Adventures of Elmo in Grouchland. During that year he also produced tracks for Yolanda Adams, Wild Orchid and Vanessa Williams. Thomas also produced the song "You're Where I Belong", written by Diane Warren for Trisha Yearwood for the movie Stuart Little.

=== 2000s ===
In early 2000, Thomas wrote and produced the hit song, "I Wanna Be with You," for Mandy Moore. The song was featured in the Columbia Pictures film, Center Stage.

In 2009, Thomas produced the Grammy Award-winning Heather Headley album, Audience of One.

=== 2010s ===
In 2012, Thomas produced the Grammy-nominated band, Forever Jones' album, Musical Revival released April 10, 2012 on EMI Records. He also reunited with Headley in 2012 to produce a project in conjunction with her lead role in the stage adaptation of The Body Guard, which opened in the UK, November 2012. The Whitney Houston tribute moves from the West End to Broadway in 2014.

Thomas produced the title track and three additional songs for The Voice finalist Chris Mann's 2012 debut album Roads on Universal Republic.
