= Next (Vanessa Williams album) =

1997 studio album by Vanessa Williams

Studio album by Vanessa Williams
- Released: August 26, 1997
- Recorded: February–June 1997
- Studio: The Bennett House (Franklin, Tennessee) (Note: Tracks 1, 5 and 12); Flyte Tyme (Edina, Minnesota) (Note: Tracks 2 and 11); Clinton (New York City) (Note: Track 3); Blue Light (New York City); Westlake (West Hollywood, California) (Note: Track 4); Sound Chamber Recorders (North Hollywood, California) (Note: Track 6; strings on track 5); Stonecreek (Gladwyne, Pennsylvania) (Note: Track 6); Avatar (New York City); Right Track (New York City) (Note: Tracks 7 and 8); Barking Doctor Recording (Mount Kisco, New York) (Note: Track 8); East Bay Recording (Tarrytown, New York) (Note: Track 9); Soundtrack (New York City); Chicago Trax (Chicago) (Note: Track 10); Chicago Recording Company (Chicago); Starstruck (Nashville, Tennessee) (Note: Strings on track 10)
- Genre: Dance-pop; hip hop soul; R&B
- Length: 53:09
- Label: Mercury
- Producer: J. Dibbs; Jimmy Jam and Terry Lewis; R. Kelly; Jeff Kievit; Rob Mathes; Dennis Ross III; Daryl Simmons; Keith Thomas

Vanessa Williams chronology
Star Bright (1996)	Next (1997)	Silver & Gold (2004)

Singles from Next
- 1. "Happiness" Released: July 24, 1997; 2. "First Thing on Your Mind" Released: September 21, 1997; 3. "Oh How the Years Go By" Released: November 27, 1997; 4. "Who Were You Thinkin' 'Bout" Released: April 21, 1998

Professional ratings
Review scores
Source	Rating
AllMusic	3/5 stars
Robert Christgau	(dud)
Los Angeles Times	2.5/4 stars

Next is the fifth studio album by American singer and actress Vanessa Williams. It was released through Mercury Records on August 26, 1997. It includes the singles "Happiness" (number 36 on the Hot R&B/Hip-Hop Singles and Tracks chart), "Who Were You Thinkin' 'Bout", "First Thing on Your Mind" and "Oh How the Years Go By" (number 6 on the Hot Adult Contemporary Tracks chart). Bonus track “And This Is Life” featured on the Japanese release of the album.

== Track listing ==
No.	Title	Writer(s)	Producer(s)	Length
1.	"Who Were You Thinkin' 'Bout?"	Keith Thomas; Phil Galdston	Thomas	4:06
2.	"Happiness"	James Harris III; Terry Lewis; John Smith	Jimmy Jam and Terry Lewis	4:27
3.	"And My Heart Goes"	J. Dibbs; Joyce Dean	J. Dibbs	4:23
4.	"First Thing on Your Mind"	Antonina Armato; Kenny Lamar McGowan; Ken Miller	Armato	3:57
5.	"Crazy 'Bout You"	Daryl Simmons	Simmons	4:34
6.	"Lost Without You"	Adrianne Johnson Ross	Dennis Ross III	4:40
7.	"Someone Like You"	Van Morrison	Jeff Kievit; Rob Mathes	4:53
8.	"The Easiest Thing"	Stephanie Lewis; Mathes	Kievit	4:34
9.	"Surrender"	Barry J. Eastmond; Siedah Garrett	Eastmond	4:55
10.	"Start Again"	R. Kelly	R. Kelly	3:56
11.	"And If I Ever" (featuring Simbi Khali)	Harris; Lewis	Jimmy Jam and Terry Lewis	4:06
12.	"Oh How the Years Go By"	Simon Climie; Will Jennings	Thomas	5:11

=== Sample credits ===
- "Happiness" contains an interpolation of "I Can't Wait" by Nu Shooz.

== Personnel ==
- Vanessa Williams – vocals, backing vocals (2, 4, 8, 9)
- Keith Thomas – keyboard programming (1), guitars (1), drum programming (1, 5, 12), synth piano (5), bass programming (5), arrangements (5, 12), acoustic piano (12), synthesizer programming (12), string arrangements (12)
- Jimmy Jam and Terry Lewis – instruments (2, 11), arrangements (2, 11)
- J. Dibbs – instruments (3)
- Daryl Simmons – synthesizer programming (5), arrangements (5)
- Dennis Ross III – acoustic piano (6), keyboards (6)
- Rob Mathes – additional strings (6), keyboards (7, 8), arrangements (7), Hammond B3 organ (8), 12-string guitar (8), backing vocals (8), music arrangements (8)
- Jan Folkson – programming (7, 8)
- Barry Eastmond – keyboards (9), arrangements (9)
- Eric Rehl – synthesizer programming (9)
- R. Kelly – instruments (10), backing vocals (10)
- Lafayette Carthon – additional keyboards (10)
- Phil Madeira – lap steel guitar (1), Hammond B3 organ (12)
- Dann Huff – guitars (5)
- Sonny Lallerstedt – acoustic guitar (6)
- Mark Shulman – electric guitar (8)
- Chuck Kawal – acoustic guitar (10), electric guitar (10)
- Jerry McPherson – guitars (12)
- Clay Sears – bass (6)
- Mark Egan – bass (7)
- Will Lee – bass (8)
- Jimmie Lee Sloas – bass (12)
- Mark Hammond – drum programming (1, 5, 12)
- Shawn Pelton – drums (6, 8)
- Trevor Gale – drum programming (9)
- Dan Needham – drums (12)
- Bashiri Johnson – percussion (7, 8)
- Dave Koz – saxophone solo (4)
- Ricardo Morales – clarinet (7)
- Roger Shell – cello (7)
- Peter Wyrick – cello (7)
- Richard Brice – viola (7)
- David Cerutti – viola (7)
- Rick Dolan – violin (7)
- Joel Pitchon – violin (7)
- Peter Winograd – violin (7)
- The Nashville String Machine – strings (12)
- Antonina Armato – arrangements (4)
- Kenny Lamar McGowan – arrangements (4)
- Jeremy Lubbock – string arrangements (5, 6), string conductor (5)
- Ronn Huff – string arrangements (12), string contractor (12)
- Jules Chaikin – string contractor (5)
- Carl Gorodetzky – string contractor (12)
- Eric Wyrick – concertmaster (7)
- Lisa Cochran – backing vocals (1)
- Lisa Keith – backing vocals (2)
- Sue Ann Carwell – backing vocals (4), additional vocal arrangements (4)
- Trey Lorenz – backing vocals (5)
- Adrienne Johnson Ross – backing vocals (6)
- Jerry Barnes – backing vocals (8)
- Katreese Barnes – backing vocals (8)
- Sharon Bryant – backing vocals (8)
- Angela Clemmons-Patrick – backing vocals (8)
- Lajuan Carter – backing vocals (9)
- Cindy Mizelle – backing vocals (9, 12)
- Cynthia Jernigan – backing vocals (10)
- Ada Dyer – backing vocals (12)
- Audrey Wheeler – backing vocals (12)

Choir on "Oh How The Years Go By"

- Chris Harris – contractor
- Michael Black, Lisa Cochran, Da'dra Crawford-Greathouse, Steve Crawford, Tim Davis, Tabitha Fair, Billy Gaines, Chris Harris, Robert White Johnson, Michael Mellett, George Pendergrass, Gary Pigg, Cindy Richardson and Denise "Nee-C" Walls – singers

== Production ==
- Bruce Carbone – executive producer
- John Dukakis – executive producer
- Qadrie El-Amin – executive producer
- Vanessa Williams – executive producer
- Shaun Shankel – production coordinator (1, 5, 12)
- Jill Dell'Abate – production coordinator (8)
- Leanne Drum – A&R coordinator
- Margery Greenspan – art direction
- Jeffdidthis (Jeff Schultz) – design
- Kevyn Aucoin – photography
- Southpaw Entertainment – management

Technical

- Herb Powers – mastering at Powers House of Sound (New York City, New York)
- Bill Whittington – recording (1, 5, 12), mixing (1, 5, 12)
- Steve Hodge – recording (2, 11), mixing (2, 11)
- Adam Kudzin – engineer (3)
- Rich Travali – mixing (3)
- Paul Arnold – engineer (4)
- Jon Gass – mixing (4)
- Joe Alexander – recording (6)
- Rob Eaton – recording (6–8), mixing (7)
- Humberto Gatica – recording (6)
- Ray Lubrana – recording (6)
- Darin Prindle – recording (6)
- David Reitzas – recording (6)
- Mick Guzauski – mixing (6, 8), additional engineer (8)
- Mikael Ifversen – engineer (9)
- Stan Wallace – engineer (9)
- Bob Brockmann – mixing (9)
- Chris Brickley – engineer (10)
- Stephen George – engineer (10), mixing (10)
- R. Kelly – mixing (10)
- Greg Parker – assistant engineer (1, 5)
- J. Dibbs – assistant engineer (3), mix assistant (3)
- Nick Brophy – assistant engineer (4)
- Casey Stone – assistant engineer (5)
- Joe Lizzi – assistant engineer (7, 8)
- Matt Curry – assistant engineer (8)
- Pete Karam – assistant engineer (8)
- Marnie Riley – assistant engineer (8), mix assistant (8)
- Tom Bender – mix assistant (8)
- Wade Thoren – assistant engineer (9)
- John Reigart – mix assistant (9)
- Jason Bacher – assistant engineer (10)
- Trey Fratt – assistant engineer (10)
- Ron Lowe – assistant engineer (10), mix assistant (10)
- Scott Ahaus – assistant engineer (12)
- Shawn McLean – assistant engineer (12)

== Charts ==
Chart performance for Next
Chart (1997)	Peak position
Japanese Albums (Oricon)	31
US Billboard 200	53
US Top R&B/Hip-Hop Albums (Billboard)	28

== Certifications ==
Certifications for Next
Region	Certification	Certified units/sales
Japan (RIAJ)	Gold	100,000^{^}
^{^} Shipments figures based on certification alone.
