= Miami (Counting Crows song) =

Single by Counting Crows

from the album Hard Candy
- Released: July 9, 2002
- Genre: Rock
- Length: 5:01
- Label: Geffen
- Songwriter(s): David Bryson, Adam Duritz, Charlie Gillingham, David Immerglück, Matt Malley, Ben Mize, Dan Vickrey
- Producer(s): Steve Lillywhite

Counting Crows singles chronology
"American Girls" (2002)	"Miami" (2002)	"Big Yellow Taxi" (2002)

"Miami" is a single by the American rock band Counting Crows. It is the seventh track on their fourth album Hard Candy (2002).

Lead singer Adam Duritz said about this song: "So you leave home.. and you fall in love again. And I found myself on the Southeastern tip of America in love with a different girl, years later. And I had been off on a bus and she went off on a plane to the other side of the world to work and I hadn’t seen her. But she was coming home after a few months to see me and she was meeting me there, at the edge of America. I went to the airport to pick her up and went down to the gates- it’s weird to think about the fact that you could go to the gates then. And I sat there and I waited for her to come. And uh, the planes came one by one down the runway, and the sun extinguished itself on the ocean. And I thought about how much I missed her, and then I got this sick feeling in this pit of my stomach cause I knew I was still the same and I knew I would leave. I mean, I was happy she was coming home, but it was temporary. Like everything back then. You could have everything in the palm of your hand and know that it is the same thing as having nothing at all. This world, this life gives you everything and nothing at the same time and doesn’t exactly tell you how to deal with that. The truth is you have to hold them both. I didn’t know how to do that. How do you live with loving something and knowing you’re going to throw it away? I stood there and watched the sun go down and her plane landed and she came home and I kissed her. And we went back to our hotel, in Miami." (10/1/08 Atlanta, GA).

== Track listing ==
1. "Miami" (Radio Edit) - 3:37
2. "Miami" (LP Version) - 5:01

== Charts ==
Chart (2002)	Peak position
US Adult Alternative Songs (Billboard)	9
