= If I Could Give All My Love (Richard Manuel Is Dead) =

2003 single by Counting Crows

Single by Counting Crows

from the album Hard Candy
- Released: June 2003
- Studio: Ocean Way (Hollywood, California); Westside (London, England)
- Length: 3:53
- Label: Geffen
- Composers: Adam F. Duritz; Dan Vickrey; David Immerglück; Charles Gillingham; Matt Malley
- Lyricist: Adam F. Duritz
- Producer: Steve Lillywhite

Counting Crows singles chronology
"Big Yellow Taxi" (2002)	"If I Could Give All My Love (Richard Manuel Is Dead)" (2003)	"She Don't Want Nobody Near" (2003)

"If I Could Give All My Love (Richard Manuel Is Dead)" is a song by American rock band Counting Crows. It is the fourth track on their fourth album, Hard Candy (2002), inspired by the death of the Band member Richard Manuel. When released as a single, it reached number 40 on the Irish Singles Chart, number 50 on the UK Singles Chart, and became a minor chart hit in Australia and the Netherlands. In the United Kingdom, it debuted and peaked at number nine on the UK Rock Singles Chart.

== Background ==
The inspiration for the song, according to Adam Duritz, came from the sense of "not lasting" he felt when he went to bed and read a newspaper that stated Richard Manuel, a founding member of the Band, had died of an apparent suicide. Manuel was a pianist and vocalist who suffered from bouts of depression—all abilities and traits shared by Duritz. Duritz stated that the sense of impermanence was "overwhelming" and 15 years after the death of Manuel this sense inspired him to write the song.

== Track listings ==
UK CD1

1. "If I Could Give All My Love" (album version) – 3:53
2. "Big Yellow Taxi" (live) – 3:22
3. "Ooh La La" – 4:34
4. "If I Could Give All My Love" (video)

UK CD2

1. "If I Could Give All My Love" (album version) – 3:53
2. "A Long December" (live) – 3:54
3. "Return of the Grievous Angel" – 4:21

European CD single

1. "If I Could Give All My Love" – 3:53
2. "Ooh La La" – 4:34

Australian CD single

1. "If I Could Give All My Love"
2. "Ooh La La"
3. "Return of the Grievous Angel"
4. "If I Could Give All My Love" (video)

== Credits and personnel ==
Credits are adapted from the Hard Candy album booklet.

Studios

- Recorded at Ocean Way Recording (Hollywood, California) and Westside Studios (London, England)
- Mastered at Gateway Mastering (Portland, Maine, US)

Counting Crows

- Adam F. Duritz – words, music, vocals, piano
- Dan Vickrey – music, electric and acoustic guitars, banjo, vocals
- David Immerglück – music, electric and acoustic guitars, bass, vocals
- Charles Gillingham – music, piano, other keys, synthesizer, vocals
- Matt Malley – music, bass guitar, vocals
- Ben Mize – drums, percussion, loops, vocals
- David Bryson – electric and acoustic guitars, vocals

Other personnel

- Steve Lillywhite – production
- Cindi Peters – production coordination
- Jack Joseph Puig – mixing
- Carl Glanville – recording
- Bob Ludwig – mastering

== Charts ==
Chart (2003)	Peak position
Australia (ARIA)	89
Ireland (IRMA)	40
Netherlands (Single Top 100)	97
Scotland Singles (Official Charts)	51
UK Singles (Official Charts)	50
UK Rock & Metal (Official Charts)	9

== Release history ==
Region	Date	Format(s)	Label(s)	Ref.
United Kingdom	June 2003	CD	Geffen	
Australia	June 16, 2003	CD	Geffen	
