= American Girls (Counting Crows song) =

2002 single by Counting Crows

Single by Counting Crows featuring Sheryl Crow

from the album Hard Candy
- Released: May 13, 2002
- Length: 4:33
- Label: Geffen
- Songwriter: Adam Duritz
- Producer: Steve Lillywhite

Counting Crows singles chronology
"All My Friends" (2000)	"American Girls" (2002)	"Miami" (2002)

Music video
- "Counting Crows - American Girls" on YouTube

"American Girls" is a single by American rock band Counting Crows. It is the second track on their fourth studio album, Hard Candy (2002), and features Sheryl Crow on backing vocals. The song was released on May 13, 2002, and reached number one on the US Billboard Triple-A chart.

== Charts ==
=== Weekly charts ===
Chart (2002)	Peak position
Ireland (IRMA)	47
Netherlands (Single Top 100)	77
Scotland Singles (OCC)	38
Switzerland (Schweizer Hitparade)	93
UK Singles (OCC)	33
US Adult Alternative Airplay (Billboard)	1
US Adult Pop Airplay (Billboard)	24

=== Year-end charts ===
Chart (2002)	Position
US Adult Top 40 (Billboard)	80
US Triple-A (Billboard)	13

== Release history ==
Region	Date	Format(s)	Label(s)	Ref(s).
United States	May 13, 2002	Triple A radio	Geffen	
Australia	June 10, 2002	CD	Geffen	
United Kingdom	June 17, 2002	CD	Geffen	
