= Judson Spence =

American singer-songwriter

Judson Spence (born 29 April 1965, Pascagoula, Mississippi) is an American pop music singer, songwriter, multi-instrumentalist based in Nashville, Tennessee. He originally gained fame when he released his eponymously titled debut solo effort on Atlantic Records in 1988. The album was produced by Monroe Jones and David Tickle, and executive produced by future Interscope founder Jimmy Iovine.

Although he had a top 40 hit with "Yeah, Yeah, Yeah" in 1988 and also had a minor hit with "Drift Away" from The Wonder Years soundtrack, Spence was dropped from Atlantic before completing his second album in 1991.

After several years of struggle, Spence's composition "The Power" was covered by both Amy Grant and Cher and was also used for a national Century 21 advertising campaign. Subsequently, he recorded the indie release "painfaithjoy" in 1995.

He performed with Trisha Yearwood on the Oscar nominated song "How Do I Live Without You" in 1997 and sang live with her on the American Music Awards, The Tonight Show, The Oscars, and the CMA Awards.

In 1999, he released his third solo album in Japan, titled I Guess I Love It before his record label, Pioneer Music Group closed its doors. That album was produced by former Eagle Bernie Leadon. In 2000, he toured with Trisha Yearwood. The following year, Wynonna Judd cut Judson's song "New Day Dawning", and it became the title track to her album.

In 2003, Spence released two albums: The Velvet Kitten Sessions, which was a mainstream collection, and Opus Dei, which was a religious-themed effort.

In 2014, Spence filmed a movie about his life, Sing the Blues, that also featured his music.

== Discography ==
- Judson Spence (1988)
- I Guess I Love It (1998?, January 23, 2001)
- The Velvet Kitten Sessions (2003)
- Judson Spence (2003)
