= This Desert Life =

Studio album by Counting Crows
- Released: November 2, 1999
- Recorded: 1998
- Genre: Alternative rock
- Length: 59:46
- Label: Geffen
- Producers: David Lowery; Dennis Herring

Counting Crows chronology
Across a Wire: Live in New York City (1998)	This Desert Life (1999)	Hard Candy (2002)

Singles from This Desert Life
- 1. "Hanginaround" Released: October 18, 1999; 2. "Mrs. Potter's Lullaby" Released: August 15, 2000; 3. "All My Friends" Released: 2000

Professional ratings
Review scores
Source	Rating
Allmusic	4/5 stars
The Encyclopedia of Popular Music	4/5 stars
Entertainment Weekly	C+
Los Angeles Times	2.5/4 stars
Q	4/5 stars
Rolling Stone	3.5/5 stars
Spin	6/10
The Village Voice	(choice cut)

This Desert Life is the third studio album from American rock band Counting Crows. The cover art is by noted comic book artist Dave McKean, best known for his work with Neil Gaiman, and was adapted from the cover art McKean did for Gaiman's picture book The Day I Swapped My Dad for Two Goldfish. The album had sold more than 2 million copies worldwide by February 2002. The song "Hanginaround" was the first of three singles released from the album, and the highest-charting single off the album, reaching number 1 on the US Billboard Adult Alternative Songs chart and number 28 on the Billboard Hot 100, as well as top ten in Canada and top 50 in a number of other countries.

The album contains the same personnel as the band's previous studio album, Recovering the Satellites, being David Bryson (guitar), Adam Duritz (vocals), Charlie Gillingham (keyboards), Matt Malley (bass), Ben Mize (drums) and Dan Vickrey (guitars), with multi-instrumentalist David Immerglück, who formerly was credited as a session player on the previous two albums, promoted to full member. It received generally positive reviews from critics.

== Background ==
Two years after the release of Counting Crows' second studio album, 1996's Recovering the Satellites, the band collaborated with producers David Lowery and Dennis Herring in a rented house in Hollywood, Los Angeles to record their third album. Describing the content of the album in comparison to other releases by the band, lead singer and primary song writer Adam Duritz remarked, "I think the first [album] was really about yearning for a change where you are, and I think the second album was very much about having gotten that change and being thrown up in the stratosphere and kind of come crashing down. And I think [This Desert Life] is about sort of recognizing that life is about confusion and change".

Lowery compared Counting Crows' past works from a more commercial aspect: "Commercially, it's been very successful for [Counting Crows] to be very introspective and sort of sad. So on this record, I thought we'd get a least a little bit of this humor and reverence to come through".

While writing and recording the album, the band allowed two songs to be used on movie soundtracks: "Colorblind" and "Baby, I'm a Big Star Now". The former was featured in the 1999 film Cruel Intentions, while the latter would feature in the 1998 film Rounders. "Colorblind" would also be used in 2014's Mommy. Concerned about having too many songs from the album available in other places, Duritz believed that two album tracks on other albums could detract people from buying This Desert Life. He was also finding it difficult to sequence the song with the album's other tracks. Ultimately, it was left off the album.

When an instrumental score album for Rounders was released instead of soundtrack album, "Baby, I'm a Big Star Now" was not broadly commercially available for many years. It was something Duritz came to regret. The song was released as a B-side on the "Hanginaround" single, and was eventually included as bonus track on the UK release of 2008's Saturday Nights & Sunday Mornings. It was most recently featured in an episode of the television series The Bear.

== Track listing ==
All tracks are written by Adam Duritz, with additional writers noted.

Side 1
No.	Title	Writer(s)	Length
1.	"Hanginaround"	David Bryson; Dan Vickrey; Ben Mize	4:07
2.	"Mrs. Potter's Lullaby"		7:46
3.	"Amy Hit the Atmosphere"	Matt Malley	4:36
4.	"Four Days"		3:28
5.	"All My Friends"		4:49
6.	"High Life"	Vickrey	6:20
7.	"Colorblind"	Charlie Gillingham	3:23
8.	"I Wish I Was a Girl"	Gillingham	5:53
9.	"Speedway"	Vickrey	3:44
10.	"St. Robinson in His Cadillac Dream"	Gillingham	5:03*
11.	"Kid Things (hidden track**)"		7:06†
Total length:			59:46

* Original track length is 15:40, which included the hidden track "Kid Things".
** On digital purchase and streaming, "Kid Things" is listed as a separate track.
† Originally a hidden track that started at 8:33 on the "St. Robinson in His Cadillac Dream" track; length includes intro and outro studio outtakes.

An unofficial double LP vinyl bootleg of the album first appeared online for sale in 2022. It includes "St. Robinson in His Cadillac Dream" and "Kid Things" as separate tracks, as well as "Baby, I'm a Big Star Now" (erroneously labeled on the cover as "I'm a Big Star Now").

== Personnel ==
=== Counting Crows ===
- Adam Duritz – lead vocals, backing vocals (1), piano (1–3, 5, 7), loo bells (3, 7)
- Charlie Gillingham – piano, Mellotron, Wurlitzer electric piano, Hammond B-3 organ, Nord, acoustic guitar, Chamberlin, handclaps (1), backing vocals, string arrangements
- Dave Bryson – electric and acoustic guitars, slide guitars, 12-string electric guitar (4), handclaps (1)
- Dan Vickrey – electric and acoustic guitars, sitar (3), handclaps (1), backing vocals
- Matt Malley – bass, 12-string guitars (10), backing vocals
- Ben Mize – drums, percussion, handclaps (1), backing vocals

==== Additional musicians ====
- David Immerglück – bass (4), pedal steel (5), electric guitar (8), mandolin
- Clay Jones – acoustic guitar (2), electric guitar (4), mandolin (10)
- Dennis Herring – keyboards (4), loops (10)
- Joel Derouin – violin
- Eve Butler – violin
- Matt Funes – viola
- Larry Corbett – cello
- David Campbell – additional string arrangements, orchestration, conductor
- Gretchen Rosenblatt – handclaps (1)
- Jennifer McComb – handclaps (1)
- Heather McComb – handclaps (1)
- Cinjun Tate – handclaps (1)
- Cedric Lemoyne – handclaps (1)
- Cindy Butler – handclaps (1)
- Jeffrey Cain – handclaps (1)
- Greg Slay – handclaps (1)
- Adam Hamilton – handclaps (1)
- Chris Seefried – handclaps (1), backing vocals (8)
- Gary DeRosa – handclaps (1), backing vocals (1)
- Craig Ruda – handclaps (1)
- Tony Moore – handclaps (1)
- Teri Polo – handclaps (1)
- Jen Keohane – handclaps (1)
- Eddie Mills – handclaps (1)
- Susan Johnson – handclaps (1)
- David Lowery – backing vocals (1)
- Cinjun Tate – backing vocals (1)

=== Technical ===
- Produced by David Lowery and Dennis Herring
- Recorded by Richard Hasal
- Additional engineers – Martin Pradler (1) and Jeff Sheehan (6)
- Mixed by Jack Joseph Puig (1), Jim Scott (2–6, 8–11), and Dennis Herring (7)
- Second engineers – Ok Hee Kim and Jim Champagne
- Mastered by Bob Ludwig at Gateway Mastering (Portland, Maine)
- Production coordination – Janette Sheridan
- Creative direction – Bill Merryfield
- Art direction – Bill Merryfield, David McKean, and Adam Duritz
- Illustrations – Dave McKean
- Photography – Rocky Schenck
- Mangement – Steve Jensen and Martin Kirkup

== Release history ==
Country	Date
United Kingdom	November 1, 1999
United States	November 2, 1999

== Charts ==
Chart (1999)	Peak position
Australian Albums (ARIA)	20
Belgian Albums (Ultratop Flanders)	26
Dutch Albums (Album Top 100)	21
German Albums (Offizielle Top 100)	36
Irish Albums (IRMA)	56
New Zealand Albums (RMNZ)	19
Norwegian Albums (VG-lista)	9
Scottish Albums (Official Charts)	54
Swedish Albums (Sverigetopplistan)	20
UK Albums (Official Charts)	19
US Billboard 200	8

== Certifications ==
Region	Certification	Certified units/sales
Canada (Music Canada)	Platinum	100,000^{^}
United Kingdom (BPI)	Gold	100,000^{*}
United States (RIAA)	Platinum	1,100,000
^{*} Sales figures based on certification alone.^{^} Shipments figures based on certification alone.
