= Puffy AmiYumi discography =

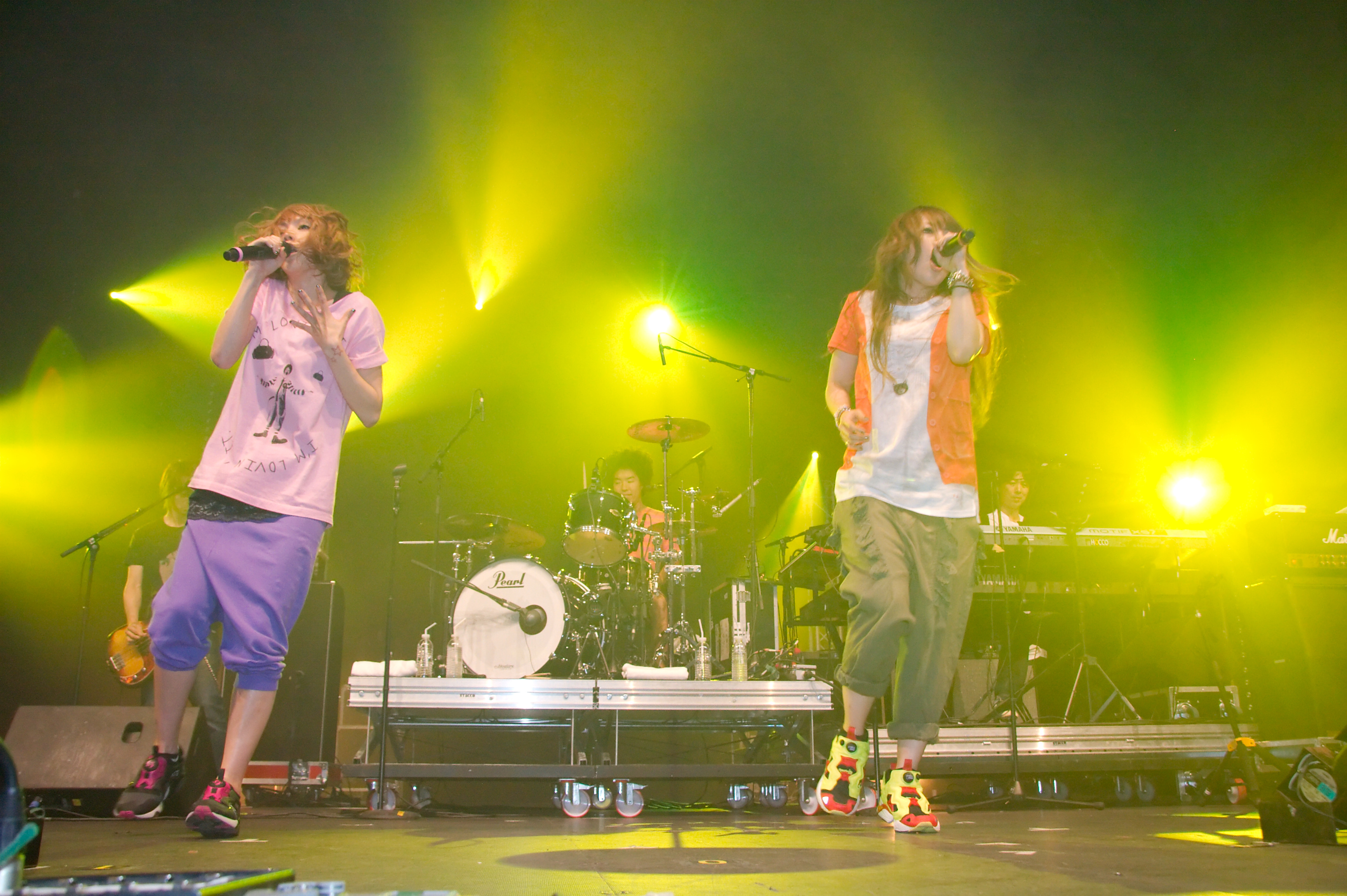
- Puffy AmiYumi live at Japan Expo 2009 (Paris, France)
- Studio albums: 14
- Compilation albums: 9
- Singles: 41
- DVDs: 12

The discography for Japanese pop-rock duo Puffy AmiYumi consists of fourteen studio albums, nine compilation albums, two remix albums, twelve video albums, and 41 singles. Their first single, "Asia no Junshin", became an instant hit in Japan where it sold more than a million records and help to catapult the group.

Jet-CD is their most successful album, having sold more than a million copies only in Japan. "Kore ga watashi no ikiru michi" is their most successful single, having sold more than 1.5 million copies only in Japan. Both songs have sold more than 15 million records worldwide.

== Albums ==
=== Studio albums ===
Title	Album details	Peak chart positions	
Title	Album details	JPN	US World
AmiYumi	Released: July 22, 1996; Label: Epic Records Japan	3	—
Solo Solo	Released: August 6, 1997; Label: Epic Records Japan	2	—
Jet CD	Released: March 31, 1998; Label: Epic Records Japan	1	—
Fever Fever	Released: June 23, 1999; Label: Epic Records Japan	3	—
Spike	Released: October 12, 2000; Label: Epic Records Japan	10	—
The Hit Parade	Released: February 20, 2002; Label: Epic Records Japan	10	—
Nice	Released: January 22, 2003; Label: Epic Records Japan	20	—
59	Released: March 31, 2004; Label: Epic Records Japan	—	—
Splurge	Released: June 28, 2006; Label: Kioon Music	19	9
Honeycreeper	Released: September 26, 2007; Label: Kioon Music	27	—
Puffy AmiYumi × Puffy	Released: March 25, 2009; Label: Kioon Music	—	—
Bring It!	Released: June 17, 2009; Label: Kioon Music	17	—
Thank You	Released: March 9, 2011; Label: Kioon Music	25	—
The Puffy	Released: September 22, 2021; Label: Warner Music Japan	27	—

=== Compilation albums ===
Title	Album details	Peak chart positions
Title	Album details	JPN
PRMX	Released: December 31, 1999; Label: Epic Records Japan	28
The Very Best of Puffy/AmiYumi Jet Fever	Released: July 5, 2000; Label: Epic Records Japan	2
An Illustrated History	Released: May 21, 2002; Label: Bar/None	—
PRMX Turbo	Released: September 18, 2003; Label: Epic Records Japan	—
Hi Hi Puffy AmiYumi	Released: May 11, 2005; Label: Kioon Music	49
Hit&Fun	Released: February 14, 2007; Label: Kioon Music	9
15	Released: November 23, 2011; Label: Kioon Music	21
20th Anniversary Best Album (非脱力派宣言)	Released: April 6, 2016; Label: Warner Music Japan	14
30th Anniversary	Released: May 13, 2026; Label: Sony Music Japan	18

== Singles ==
Title	Year	Peak chart positions	Album
Title	Year	JPN	Album
"Asia no Junshin" (アジアの純真, Ajia no Junshin; True Asia)	1996	3	AmiYumi
"Kore ga Watashi no Ikiru Michi" (これが私の生きる道; That's the Way It Is)	1996	1	Jet CD
"Circuit no Musume" (サーキットの娘, Sākitto no Musume; Wild Girls on the Circuit)	1997	1	Jet CD
"Nagisa ni Matsuwaru Et Cetera" (渚にまつわるエトセトラ, Nagisa ni Matsuwaru eto Setora)	1997	1	Jet CD
"Mother/Nehorina Hahorina" (Mother/ネホリーナハホリーナ)	1997	5	Jet CD
"Ai no Shirushi" (愛のしるし; Sign of Love)	1998	3	Jet CD
"Tararan/Puffy no Tormen" (たららん/パフィーのツアーメン)	1998	4	Fever*Fever
"Puffy de Rumba" (パフィー de ルンバ, Pafī de Rumba)	1998	14	Fever*Fever
"Nichiyōbi no Musume" (日曜日の娘; Sunday Girls)	1999	15	Fever*Fever
"Yume no tame ni" (夢のために; For Our Dreams)	1999	12	Fever*Fever
"Umi e to/Pool ni te" (海へと/プールにて, Umi e to/Pūru ni te)	2000	15	Spike
"Boogie Woogie No. 5" (ブギウギ No.5)	2000	22	Spike
"Atarashī Hibi" (あたらしい日々; Brand-new Days)	2001	28	Nice
"Aoi Namida" (青い涙; Blue Tears)	2001	32	The Hit Parade
"Hurricane" (ハリケーン, Harikēn)	2002	36	The Hit Parade
"Akai Buranko/Planet Tokyo" (赤いブランコ/Planet Tokyo; Red Swing/Planet Tokyo)	2002	45	Nice
"Sunrise"	2004	34	59
"Hajimari no Uta/Nice Buddy" (はじまりのうた/ナイスバディ, Hajimari no Uta/Naisu Badi; Song of Origin/Nice Buddy)	2005	33	Splurge
"Hi Hi"	2005	—	Hi Hi Puffy AmiYumi
"Mogura Like" (モグラライク, Mogura Raiku)	2006	33	Splurge
"Tokyo I'm on My Way"	2006	58	Splurge
"Hazumu Rhythm" (ハズムリズム, Hazumu Rizumu) (feat. Tokyo Ska Paradise Orchestra)	2006	15	Hit&Fun
"Hataraku Otoko" (働く男; Working Boy)	2006	41	Hit&Fun
"Boom Boom Beat"	2007	47	Honeycreeper
"Oriental Diamond/Kuchibiru Motion" (オリエンタル・ダイヤモンド/くちびるモーション, Orientaru Daiyamondo/Kuchibiru Mōshon)	2007	—	Honeycreeper
"All Because of You"	2008	34	Bring It!
"My Story"	2008	44	Bring It!
"Hiyori Hime" (日和姫; Weather Princess)	2009	38	Bring It!
"Dareka ga" (誰かが; Someone)	2009	30	15
"R.G.W."	2010	44	Thank You!
"Happy Birthday" (ハッピーバースデイ, Happī Bāsudei)	2011	—	Thank You!
"Sweet Drops"	2011	34	15
"Tomodachi no Wao!" (トモダチのわお！)	2012	—	20th Anniversary Best Album
"Datsu Dystopia" (脱ディストピア, Datsu Disutopia)	2013	—	20th Anniversary Best Album
"Himitsu no Gimme Cat: Ufufu Hontō yo" (秘密のギミーキャット 〜うふふ 本当よ〜, Himitsu no Gimme Kyatto: Ufufu Hontō yo)	2014	—	20th Anniversary Best Album
"Colorful Wave Surfers"	2015	—	Non-album single
"Puffypipoyama" (パフィピポ山, Pafīpipoyama)	2015	—	The Puffy
"Bōken no Dadada" (冒険のダダダ)	2017	—	The Puffy
"Susume Nonsense" (すすめナンセンス, Susume Nonsensu)	2018	—	The Puffy
"Hō yare ho" (ほうやれほ)	2020	—	Non-album single
"Pathfinder"	2021	—	The Puffy
"Sweet Sweet"	2023	—	The Puffy
"Collage"	2024	—	Non-album single

== DVDs ==
The release date on DVD is in parentheses

1. Run! Puffy! Run! 1996 (2000, and VHS)
2. Tour! Puffy! Tour! 1997 (2000, and VHS)
3. Jet Tour '98 (2000)
4. Jet DVD 1998 (2000) - Music videos, including Chinese version of "Kore ga Watashi no Ikiru Michi"
5. Fever Fever 1999 (2000) - Concert footage from Fever Fever tour
6. Clips (July 5, 2000, and VHS) #15
7. Puffy Spike Daisakusen (2001) - Concert footage
8. Rolling Debut Revue – Canada USA Tour 2002 (2002)
9. Fun Clips Fun Club (2005) #99
10. Tour! Puffy! Tour! 10 Final (2006) # 168
11. Sparks Go Go 15th Special Junk! Junk! Junk! (2006) #186
12. Sparks Go Go 20th Anniversary Special (Junk! Junk! Junk! 2010) #58

== Other works ==
- Hosted Pa-Pa-Pa-Pa-Puffy.
- Appeared on Jimmy Kimmel Live! on April 25, 2005.
- Played "Electric Beach Fever" and "That's the Way It Is" at Japan's New Year's Eve Countdown show (2005–2006).
- Recorded a version of "Girls Just Wanna Have Fun" with Cyndi Lauper on her album, The Body Acoustic.
- Recorded the Teen Titans theme song.
- Recorded the opening theme (Sunrise) for SD Gundam Force.
- Two songs from Puffy AmiYumi's Solo Solo album, Yumi Yoshimura's solo song, "Kyōki na Futari" (lit. 'Perfect Couple'), for an opening theme and Ami Onuki's solo song, "Tadaima" (lit. 'I'm Home') for an ending theme were recorded for Fair, then Partly Piggy.
- Recorded the song "Hito Natsu No Keiken" on the Yamaguchi Momoe Tribute Album Tribute Thank You For....
- Recorded a cover version of the Guitar Wolf song "Can-Nana Fever" on a tribute album I Love Guitar Wolf Very Much.
- Contributed backing vocals on "Sayonara" for an early American version and eventual Japanese version of Bleu's album Redhead.
- "Friends Forever" was featured on the Scooby-Doo 2: Monsters Unleashed soundtrack.
- "Urei" was featured in "Big Appetite in Little Tokyo", the first episode of second season of What's New, Scooby-Doo?
- "Hi Hi" was featured in Chilean telenovela Brujas.
- "Asia no Junshin" was featured on the compilation album Japan For Sale Vol.1 and arcade game Taiko no Tatsujin 5.
- "Atarashī Hibi" was featured on the compilation album Japan For Sale Vol.2.
- "Hajimari no Uta" was featured on the compilations albums Jpop CD, Vol. 2 and Pikachu The Movie Song Best 1998-2008. It was also featured in Pokémon film Pokémon: Lucario and the Mystery of Mew.
- Nice Buddy was featured in the eighth episode of the first season of Gossip Girl titled "Seventeen Candles".
- "Kore ga Watashi no Ikiru Michi" was featured in Heroes episode called Genesis (first season, first episode). It was used in Donkey Konga 3. It also was used in the French/Japanese film Wasabi.
- "Ai no Shirushi" was featured in Japanese film Waterboys. and Love Com.
- Recorded the opening theme "Hataraku Otoko" for Hataraki Man, originally by Unicorn.
- Recorded the opening theme "Oh Edo Nagareboshi IV" for anime television series Oh! Edo Rocket.
- Recorded the opening theme "Hiyori Hime" for Genji Monogatari Sennenki anime television series.
- Recorded and covered "Wedding Bell", originally by Sugar, for Japanese drama Konkatsu!.
- Recorded "Dareka ga" for Naruto Shippuden the Movie: The Will of Fire.
- Recorded "Sweet Drops" for Bunny Drop film.
- Recorded "Now Romantic" for CD compilation Yoshimoto Cover & Best (CD).
- "Susume Nonsense" was recorded as the eleventh ending theme for Chibi Maruko-chan appearing for the first time in episode 1119 premiered on October 8, 2017.
- Performed "Koi no Vacance" song by The Peanuts for Chibi Maruko-chan 1995 Christmas Special premiered on December 23, 2018.
- Recorded a cover of "The Night Begins to Shine" for the ending of four-part special Teen Titans Go! based on the song, which was also included on the soundtrack CD.
