= Hit&Fun =

Compilation album by PUFFY
- Released: February 2007 (Japan release)
- Genre: Pop
- Label: Ki/oon Records (Japan)

PUFFY chronology
Splurge (2006)	Hit&Fun (2007)	Honeycreeper (2007)

Hit&Fun is a compilation album by pop duo PUFFY, that was released on February 14, 2007.

The album features tracks especially chosen by fans via an internet survey. 3 songs could be picked, with reasons given, and extra messages for Puffy were also allowed. A majority of the songs featured have previously been released in singles/numerous other albums themselves, while a couple have only ever been released on one album each ('Hito ni Yasashiku' from The Hit Parade and 'Invisible Tomorrow' from Nice.)

The limited version of the album contained a 2nd disc (a minidisc) in addition to the regular disc, and contained 4 extra songs.

== Track listing ==
DISC 01:

1. Tokyo I'm on My Way
2. 海へと (Umi e To)
3. 渚にまつわるエトセトラ (Nagisa ni matsuwaru etc.)
4. Hi Hi
5. 働く男 (Hataraku Otoko)
6. 赤いブランコ(Akai Buranko)
7. サーキットの娘 (Circuit no Musume)
8. パフィーのルール (Puffy no Rule - Puffy's Rule)
9. これが私の生きる道 (Kore ga Watashi no Ikiru Michi)
10. ともだち (Tomodachi - Friends)
11. モグラライク (Mogura Like)
12. ブギウギ No.5 (Boogie Woogie No.5)
13. Teen Titans Theme
14. 人にやさしく (Hito ni Yasashiku)
15. 愛のしるし (Ai no Shirushi)
16. Invisible Tomorrow
17. ハズムリズム (Hazumu Rizumu)
18. たららん (Tararan)
19. アジアの純真 (Asia no Junshin)
20. オトメモリアル (Otomemoriaru)

DISC 02 (available in Limited Edition only):

1. Call Me What You Like
2. Go Baby Power Now
3. TEEN TITANS THEME -POLYSICS' CR-06 MIX-
4. Basket Case (Live at 日比谷野音 2006/5/13)

== Chart performance ==
In Japan it peaked at # 9, selling 17.896 copies that week, and stayed in the chart for 6 weeks.

Chart (2007)	Peak position
Japanese Albums Chart	9
