= The Very Best of Puffy / amiyumi jet fever =

Compilation album by PUFFY
- Released: July 5, 2000
- Genres: J-pop, pop rock
- Length: 70:17
- Language: Japanese
- Label: Epic Records Japan
- Producers: Tamio Okuda, Andy Sturmer, Masanori Sasaji

The Very Best of Puffy / amiyumi jet fever is the debut compilation album by J-pop/rock duo PUFFY. It was released on July 5th, 2000 under Epic Records Japan. The album features the duo's hit singles such as "Kore ga Watashi no Ikiru Michi" and "Ai no Shirushi", including the Mandarin versions of the tracks for the Taiwanese/Hong Kong release.

== Track listing ==
No.	Title	Length
1.	"Kore ga Watashi no Ikiru Michi"	3:19
2.	"Nagisa ni Matsuwaru Et Cetera"	3:53
3.	"Asia no Junshin"	4:40
4.	"Circuit no Musume"	3:22
5.	"Umi he to"	3:10
6.	"Ai no Shirushi"	2:46
7.	"Nehori-na Hahori-na"	4:22
8.	"Stray Cats Fever"	4:42
9.	"Tararan"	4:19
10.	"Toku Suru Karada"	4:00
11.	"Nichiyoubi no Musume"	3:35
12.	"Mother"	3:40
13.	"V-A-C-A-T-I-O-N"	3:29
14.	"Honey"	2:45
15.	"Yume no Tame ni"	3:10
16.	"Puffy de Rumba"	3:31
17.	"Jet Keisatsu"	3:45
18.	"Dare ga Sore wo"	4:32
19.	"Kore ga Watashi no Ikiru Michi (Mandarin Version)"	3:18
20.	"Ai no Shirushi (Mandarin Version)"	2:46

== Charts ==
=== Weekly charts ===
Chart (2000)	Peak position
Japanese Albums (Oricon)	4

=== Year-end charts ===
Chart (2000)	Peak position
Japanese Albums (Oricon)	2

== Release history ==
Date	Edition(s)	Formats	Label	Ref.
July 5, 2000	Standard	CD	Epic Records Japan	
June 20, 2011	Standard	Digital Download	Epic Records Japan	
