= An Illustrated History =

Studio album by Puffy
- Released: May 21, 2002 (US) (CA)
- Genre: Pop
- Length: 64:55
- Label: Bar None; BRN-CD-128

Puffy chronology
The Very Best of Puffy/AmiYumi Jet Fever (2000)	An Illustrated History (2002)	PRMX Turbo (2003)

Professional ratings
Review scores
Source	Rating
AllMusic	4.5/5 stars

An Illustrated History is the second North American album released by Japanese pop group Puffy AmiYumi. It was released on May 21, 2002. (See 2002 in music).

The album consists of a compilation of Puffy's greatest hits in Japan since their debut, albeit in English lyrics. At least one song from each of Puffy's pre-2002 Japanese album releases were included, with the exception of solosolo. Notably, it included the whole of the Atarashii Hibi single, but without the karaoke song.

There is also a bonus movie of 'Boogie-Woogie No.5' able to be seen on a QuickTime Player when placed into a computer.

== Track listing ==
1. Love So Pure (Andy Sturmer)
2. True Asia (Asia no Junshin) (English Version) (Yosui Inoue, Tamio Okuda)
3. That's the Way It Is (Kore ga Watashi no Ikirumichi) (Tamio Okuda)
4. Electric Beach Fever (Nagisa ni Matsuwaru Et Cetera) (Okuda)
5. Wild Girls on Circuit (Circuit no Musume) (Okuda)
6. Sign of Love Captain Funk's Puffy De Samba Mix (Ai no Shirushi) (Kusano Masamune)
7. Puffy de Rumba (Puffy AmiYumi, Tamura Yoriko)
8. Talalan (Tararan) (Puffy AmiYumi, Sturmer)
9. Sunday Girls (Nichiyoubi no Musume) (Okuda)
10. Friends (Tomodachi) (Puffy AmiYumi, Sturmer)
11. Mother (Okuda)
12. Neholina (Nehorina Hahorina) (Matsumoto Tortoise)
13. Brand New Days (Atarashii Hibi) (Puffy AmiYumi, Sturmer)
14. Stray Cats Fever (Masanori Sasaji)
15. Puffy's Rule (Puffy no Rule) (Okuda, Takashi Furuta)
16. Jet Police (Jet Keisatsu) (Okuda)

Bonus QuickTime music video

1. Boogie Woogie (No. 5) (Okuda)
