= Hataraku Otoko =

Single by Puffy AmiYumi
- Released: November 22, 2006
- Genre: Pop / Rock

Puffy AmiYumi singles chronology
"Hazumu Rizumu" (2006)	"Hataraku Otoko" (2006)	"Boom Boom Beat/Oh Edo NagareboshiIV" (2007)

Music video
- "Hataraku Otoko" on YouTube

"Hataraku Otoko" is a single by Japanese pop duo Puffy AmiYumi released on November 22, 2006. The title song is used as the theme to the anime series Hataraki Man.

The single's tracks are all Puffy cover songs originally from different bands. 'Hataraku Otoko' was a song by Tamio Okuda's band Unicorn, 'Lucy in the Sky with Diamonds' was by The Beatles, that originally appeared on John Lennon's tribute album 'Happy Birthday, John' and 'Don't Bring Me Down' by Electric Light Orchestra.

The single's cover is also notable for being drawn by Moyoco Anno, the creator of Hataraki Man.

The Song was later included in 2007's album Hit&Fun

== Track listing ==
1. 働く男 (Hataraku Otoko/Working Man)
2. Lucy in the Sky with Diamonds
3. Don't Bring Me Down

== Chart performance ==
The single peaked at number 41 on the singles chart, selling 3.426 copies that week, and stayed on the chart for 3 weeks.

Chart (2006)	Peak position
Japan (Oricon)	41
