= Hi Hi Puffy AmiYumi (album) =

Compilation album /Soundtrack album by Puffy AmiYumi
- Released: November 16, 2004
- Recorded: 1996–2004
- Genres: J-pop; rock
- Length: 51:25
- Labels: Epic, Sony Music Soundtrax
- Producers: Tamio Okuda, Andy Sturmer, Tetsutaro Sakurai

Puffy AmiYumi chronology
59 (2004)	Hi Hi Puffy AmiYumi (2004)	Splurge (2006)

Professional ratings
Review scores
Source	Rating
Allmusic	4.5/5 stars

Hi Hi Puffy AmiYumi is a compilation album by pop duo Puffy AmiYumi, released in 2004. It was compiled to tie in with the group's animated series of the same name. There is also a Japanese version of this CD, of which contains the subtitle, "Happy Fun Rock Music from the Series" and includes two additional "TV Mix" tracks. The album peaked at #49 on the Japanese Albums Chart.

== Commercial performance ==
By April 2005, the album had sold around 11,000 copies.

== Track listing ==
1. "Hi Hi" (Onuki, Yoshimura, Sturmer) – 2:54
2. "Friends Forever" (Sturmer) – 4:03
3. "Planet Tokyo" (Sturmer) – 3:50
4. "Joining a Fan Club" (Jellyfish cover) (Manning, Sturmer) – 3:58
5. "Forever" (Sturmer) – 2:29
6. "V-A-C-A-T-I-O-N" (Yasuharu) – 3:30
7. "Love So Pure" (Sturmer) – 3:57
8. "True Asia" (Inoue, Okuda) – 4:40
9. "Boogie-Woogie No. 5" (Okuda) – 4:10
10. "That's the Way It Is" (Okuda) – 3:19
11. "Sunrise" (Onuki, Yoshimura, Sturmer) – 3:56
12. "Into the Beach" (also known as "To the Beach" (Okuda) – 3:12
13. "December" (Onuki, Yoshimura, Sturmer) – 4:20
14. "Teen Titans Theme" (Sturmer) – 3:10
15. "Hi Hi Puffy AmiYumi (TV Mix)" (Sturmer) – 2:59 †
16. "Teen Titans Theme (TV Mix)" (Sturmer) – 3:06 †

† Appears only on the Japanese Version of this CD.

== Personnel ==
- Ami Onuki - vocals
- Yumi Yoshimura - vocals
- Puffy AmiYumi - vocals, harmony
- Ikhoka Mukara - guitar
- Kohsaku Abe - drums
- Shinji Asakura - percussion
- Dorian Crozier - drums
- John Fields - bass, guitar, keyboards
- Takashi Furuta - drums, harmony
- Michael S. Kawai - percussion
- Hiroharu Kinoshita - bass
- Maki Kitada - bass
- Masahiro Kitahara - trombone
- Haruo Kubota - guitar
- Daisaku Kume - keyboards
- Takamune Negishi - bass, harmony
- Tamio Okuda - guitar, saxophone, vocoder, harmony
- Susumu Osada - guitar, harmonica
- Zac Rae - glockenspiel, theremin, optigan
- Yuta Saito - keyboards
- Zuyi Ratza - background vocals
- Tetsutaro Sakurai - background vocals
- Iyaza Kukora - background vocals
- Thomas Tjärnqvist - bass, guitar, keyboards
- Lyle Workman - guitar
- Konishi Yasuharu - keyboards

== Production ==
- Producers: Tamio Okuda, Tetsutaro Sakurai, Andy Sturmer
- Executive producers: Yasunori Heguri, Taizo Ito
- Mixing: David Bianco, John Fields, Osamu Hirose, Tetsuhiro Miyajima, David Thoener, Dave Way, Joe Zook
- Mastering: Stephen Marcussen
- A&R: June Shinozaki
- Director: Isao Tanuma
- Compilation: Kaz Utsunomiya
- Art direction: Aimee MacAuley
- Design: Aimee MacAuley
- Photography: Bruce Osborn
