= R.G.W. (song) =

Single by Puffy AmiYumi

from the album Thank You
- Released: November 17, 2010
- Genre: Pop
- Label: Ki/oon Records

Puffy AmiYumi singles chronology
"Dareka ga" (2009)	"R.G.W." (2010)	"Happy Birthday" (2011)

Music video
- "R.G.W." on YouTube

R.G.W. is single by Japanese rock duo Puffy, released on November 17, 2010. The meaning of the name is red, green and white, which are the symbolic colors of Christmas.

A limited edition of the single was released along with the regular edition. The limited edition features an extra live DVD showing footage of 6 songs from Puffy's 2010 Gekidan Asesu Tour. The song was used as the theme song for the Japanese release of Toy Story 3, the b-sides were used as theme songs for TV shows as well, the first one was used for NTV's DON.

== Track listing ==
=== CD single ===
1. R.G.W
2. Jet Love
3. Koi No Yamaarashi

=== DVD (Limited Edition only) ===
1. Nice Buddy
2. Ai no shirushi
3. Circuit no Musume
4. Complaint
5. Boogie Woogie No. 5
6. Youkai PUFFY

== Chart performance ==
The single peaked at number 44 on the singles chart, selling 2.091 copies that week, and stayed on the chart for 2 weeks. The track failed to enter the top 50 in the Billboard charts and remained for only one week on the Hot Single Sales and Hot 100, for the Hot Airplay chart the single drop to number 89 before exciting the chart the next week. On J-Wave the single debuted at number 84 and the next week peaked at 52, the song stayed another 2 weeks on the chart.

=== Oricon Sales Chart ===
Chart (2010)	Peak position
Japan (Oricon)	44

=== Billboard Japan Sales Chart ===
Chart	Peak position
Billboard Japan Hot 100	60
Billboard Japan Hot Top Airplay	59
Billboard Japan Hot Singles Sales	64

=== J-Wave Airplay Chart ===
Chart (2010)	Peak position
J-Wave Tokio Hot 100	52
