= My Story (Puffy AmiYumi song) =

Single by Puffy AmiYumi

from the album Bring It!
- Released: August 6, 2008
- Genre: Rock
- Songwriter: PUFFY
- Producer: Anders Hellgren & David Myhr

Puffy AmiYumi singles chronology
"All Because of You" (2007)	"My Story" (2008)	"Hiyori Hime" (2009)

Music video
- "My Story" on YouTube

"My Story" (マイストーリー) is the 26th single by Japanese pop duo Puffy AmiYumi released on August 6, 2008.

A limited edition of the single was released along with the regular edition. The limited edition features a different cover and contains an extra live DVD showing footage of 4 songs from Puffy's 2007 honeysweeper tour at SHIBUYA-AX.

== Track listing ==
=== CD single ===
1. マイストーリー (My Story)
2. Twilight Shooting Star!
3. All Because Of You (DISCO TWINS Remix)

=== CD single ===
1. マイストーリー (My Story)
2. Twilight Shooting Star!
3. All Because Of You (DISCO TWINS Remix)

=== DVD ===
1. サヨナラサマー (Sayonara Samaa/So Long, Summer)
2. オリエンタル・ダイヤモンド (Oriental Diamond)
3. 赤いブランコ (Akai Buranko/Red Swing)
4. 渚にまつわるエトセトラ (Nagisa ni Matsuwaru Et Cetera/Electric Beach Fever)
