= Frank Enea =

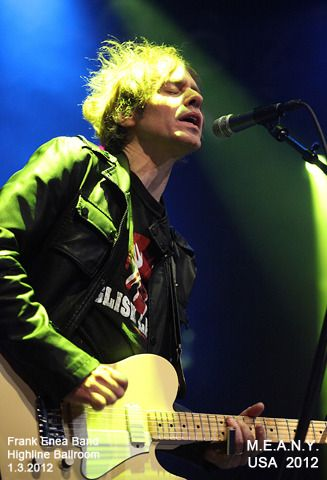

Background information
- Born: White Plains, New York
- Genres: Rock
- Occupations: Musician; singer; songwriter
- Instruments: Guitar; vocals
- Years active: 1984–present
- Label: Telepictures
- Website: frankeneaband.com

Frank Enea is an American musician and songwriter known as the composer, backup vocalist, and guitarist of the band B.E.R. from the Teen Titans Go! animated series. He is known for writing "The Night Begins to Shine" which peaked at #23 on the Billboard Hot Rock songs chart and #1 on the iTunes Rock song chart. The B.E.R. songs "Forever Mine" and "Rise Up" were featured on the soundtrack Teen Titans Go! (Songs from The Night Begins to Shine Special) which peaked at #8 on the Billboard Kid Albums chart and #17 on the Billboard Soundtracks chart. He is a founding member of Frank Enea & the Crooked Hearts, and his music has appeared in several television shows, commercials, and the film Brilliant Mistakes.

"The Night Begins to Shine" was originally written and produced in 2005 as an "'80s-style song" for a music library. The song was first featured in the Teen Titans Go! episode "Slumber Party" as a throwaway joke. The song became popular with fans of the show. The song was subsequently featured in the episode, "40%, 40%, 20%", and was prominently featured in two specials, the four-part 2017 special "The Day the Night Stopped Beginning to Shine and Became Dark Even Though It Was the Day" and a five-part sequel released in 2020, "The Night Begins To Shine 2". The special also featured two other songs by B.E.R., "Forever Mine" and "Rise Up", as well as three covers of the song from Fall Out Boy, CeeLo Green, and Puffy AmiYumi.

== Discography ==
=== Albums ===
Title	Details
Makeshift Days	Released: May 11, 2003; Label: VisionX Records; Format: CD, digital download, streaming
The Morning Show	Released: April 27, 2010; Label: ACM Records; Format: Digital download, streaming
Walk on Water	Released: 2012; Label: Norther Glare; Format: Digital download, streaming
Sunshine in My Head	Released: April 26, 2018; Label: Norther Glare; Format: Digital download, streaming
Melting Pop	Released: July 11, 2020; Label: Norther Glare; Format: Digital download, streaming

=== Singles ===
Title	Year	Notes	Album
Happy Holiday	2006	Included on an ACM Records holiday album	Happy Holiday
Walk on Water	2012	Featured in film Brilliant Mistakes	Walk on Water
Walk the World	2019	Featured in Kane 11 Socks advertisements	Non-album singles
Best Time of the Year	2019	Christmas song	Non-album singles
