= Akai Buranko =

"Akai Buranko/Planet Tokyo"

Single by Puffy AmiYumi
- Released: 20 November 2002
- Genre: J-Rock

Puffy AmiYumi singles chronology
"Hurricane" (2002)	"Akai Buranko/Planet Tokyo" (2002)	"Sunrise" (2004)

Music video
- "Red Swing" on YouTube

Akai Buranko (赤いブランコ ) (Red Swing) is the 16th single released by Japanese pop duo Puffy AmiYumi. "Red Swing" was the opening track for Nice. There is an English version titled "Planet Tokyo".

Sophie Bennett and Kia Luby covered "Planet Tokyo" on their CDs Spin and Planet Tokyo.

== Tracks ==
1. 赤いブランコ (Akai Buranko)
2. Planet Tokyo
3. アジアの純真 ～English Version～
4. Red Swing
