= Hi Hi Puffy Bu =

Japanese television series

- Kanji: Hi Hi Puffy 部
- Starring: Ami Onuki; Yumi Yoshimura
- Country of origin: Japan
- No. of episodes: 13

Production
- Running time: 10 minutes

Original release
- Network: TV Asahi
- Release: 5 July – 27 September 2006

Hi Hi Puffy Club, more accurately titled Hi Hi Puffy Bu (Hi Hi Puffy 部, Hi Hi Puffy Kurabu), is Puffy AmiYumi's reality television series, which premiered on TV Asahi on 22 July 2007. The show stars both Ami Onuki and Yumi Yoshimura, and its opening credits include them in a cel-shaded manga. The theme song for the series is "Shall We Dance?" from their Splurge album.

The spoken title of the show in Japanese ("Hi Hi Puffy Bu") is meant to be something of a joke. It is often called "Hi Hi Puffy Club" in the west.

== Episode list ==
1. 06.07.05 第1回放送 (Kinkyû kikaku kaigi!!!) (5 July 2006) - In this episode they sat down with TV Asahi executives to decide the name of the show
2. 06.07.12 第2回放送 (Jidôsha bu!) (12 July 2006) - In this episode they built a bicycle
3. 06.07.19 第3回放送 (Rajikon bu!) (19 July 2006) - In this episode they played with remote controlled vehicles
4. 06.07.26 第4回放送 (Nitto bu!)(26 July 2006) - In this episode they knitted (Yumi made a coaster, Ami made a hat)
5. 06.08.02 第5回放送 (Keiba bu! Zenpen)(2 August 2006) - In this episode they learned how to bet on horses (we were left wondering who won until next week)
6. 06.08.09 第6回放送 (Keiba bu! Kôhen) (9 August 2006) - In this episode they learned how to bet on horses
7. 06.08.16 第7回放送 (Tonma bu!)(16 August 2006) - In this episode they played with Teddy Bears
8. 06.08.23 第8回放送 (Autodoa bu! Zenpen) (23 August 2006) - In this episode they eat "Nagashi-Somen", remodel a capsule of a photo and make an ocarina.
9. 06.08.30 第9回放送 (Autodoa bu! Kôhen) (30 August 2006) -
10. 06.09.06 第10回放送 (Herushî bu!)(6 September 2006) -
11. 06.09.13 第11回放送 (Manâ bu!) (13 September 2006) - Puffy take a fitness test with Mr.Pierre Taki
12. 06.09.20 第12回放送 (Bishoku kurabu!) (20 September 2006) -
13. 06.09.27 第13回放送 (Hansei kai!) (27 September 2006) -
