= RGW =

RGW may refer to:

- Residential gateway, a hardware device connecting a home network with a wide area network (WAN) or the internet
- RGW, Rat für gegenseitige Wirtschaftshilfe, the East German abbreviation for Comecon
- RGW, relic gravitational waves
- R.G.W. (song) Japanese-language Christmas song
- Ramsgreave and Wilpshire railway station, England; National Rail station code RGW
- Rio Grande Western Railway
- RGW is an abbreviation for "red-green-white", just as RGB is an abbreviation for "red-green-blue", which is a very important concept in color television, color photography, etc. See RGB color model.
