= Boom Boom Beat =

Boom Boom Beat may refer to:

- Boom Boom Beat, album by Australian TV children's presenters Best Children's Album ARIA Music Awards of 2002
- "Boom Boom Beat", 2001 song by Australian TV children's presenters Hi-5 (Australian group)
- Boom Boom Beat Eurobeat label
- Boom Boom Beat (Puffy AmiYumi song)
