= Bring It! =

Studio album by Puffy
- Released: June 17, 2009
- Genre: Pop rock
- Length: 52:21
- Label: Kioon

Puffy chronology
Honeycreeper (2007)	Bring It! (2009)	Thank You (2011)

Singles from Bring it!
- 1. "All Because of You" Released: May 21, 2008; 2. "My Story" Released: August 6, 2008; 3. "Hiyori Hime" Released: February 25, 2009

Alternate cover
- North American cover

Bring It! is the eleventh studio album by the Japanese pop rock duo Puffy. Kioon Records released the album on June 17, 2009. Puffy worked with producers including Butch Walker, The Merrymakers, Masahiko Shimura, Roger Joseph Manning Jr., Shiina Ringo, Kazuyoshi Saito, and Yuta Saito. A pop rock album performed in Japanese and English, its lyrical themes revolve around love and self-acceptance.

The album was supported by the release of three singles, "All Because of You", "My Story", and "Hiyori Hime".

== Track listing ==
No.	Title	Lyrics	Music	Length
1.	"I Don't Wanna"	Avril Lavigne; Butch Walker	Lavigne; Walker	3:27
2.	"My Story"	PUFFY	Anders Hellgren; David Myhr	3:49
3.	"Bye Bye"	Masahiko Shimura	Shimura	4:47
4.	"My Hero!"	Roger Joseph Manning Jr.	Manning	3:47
5.	"Shuen no Onna"	Ringo Sheena	Sheena	3:14
6.	"Doki Doki"	Shimura	Shimura	3:25
7.	"Twilight Shooting Star!"	Sawao Yamanaka	Yamanaka	3:18
8.	"Hare Onna"	Kazuyoshi Saito	Saito	4:42
9.	"All Because of You"	Lavigne; Walker	Lavigne; Walker	2:25
10.	"Anata to Watashi"	PUFFY	Yuta Saito	4:44
11.	"Hiyori Hime"	Sheena	Sheena	3:05
12.	"Bring It On"	Ami Onuki	Takeshi Hosomi	3:34
13.	"Wedding Bell"	Yoshiaki Furuta	Furuta	3:32
Total length:				00:52:21

North American bonus track
No.	Title	Lyrics	Music	Length
14.	"Darekaga"	Yusuke Chiba	Chiba	4:25
Total length:				00:56:46

== Charts ==
Weekly chart positions for Bring It!
Chart (2009)	Peak position
Japan (Oricon)	17
