= All Because of You (Puffy song) =

Single by Puffy

from the album Bring It!
- Released: May 21, 2008
- Genre: Pop-punk; pop rock; J-pop
- Length: 2:25
- Label: Kioon
- Songwriters: Avril Lavigne; Butch Walker
- Producer: Butch Walker

Puffy singles chronology
"Oriental Diamond/Kuchibiru Motion" (2007)	"All Because of You" (2008)	"My Story" (2008)

Music video
- "All Because of You" on YouTube

"All Because of You" is the 25th single from Japanese pop duo Puffy AmiYumi released on May 21, 2008. The title song is written and composed by Avril Lavigne and Butch Walker, and is performed entirely in English. The song was originally intended for Avril’s third studio album The Best Damn Thing. The second song Frontier no Pioneer is a cover originally produced by Tamio Okuda and was used as a CM song for Kagome vegetable juice "Yasai Seikatsu 100!".

The limited edition has different cover art, and comes with a bonus DVD including footage of four songs recorded live at their December 19, 2007 tour finale at the Shibuya AX.

== Track listings and formats ==
- CD Single
1. "All Because of You" – 2:25
2. "フロンティアのパイオニア" ("Frontier Pioneer") – 3:40
3. "Closet Full of Love" (Ryukyudisko Remix) – 4:13

=== CD ===
1. All Because Of You
2. Furontia no Paionia/フロンティアのパイオニア/Frontier Pioneer
3. Closet Full Of Love (RYUKYUDISKO REMIX)

=== DVD ===
1. Boom Boom Beat
2. Tokyo I'm On My Way
3. Kimi To Motorbike
4. Wild Girls On Circuit

== Credits and personnel ==
Credits and personnel adapted from Bring It! album liner notes.

- Puffy – vocals, backing vocals
- Avril Lavigne – writer
- Butch Walker – writer, producer, guitar, bass, keyboards, percussion, backing vocals, programming
- Josh Freese – drums

== Chart performance ==
The single peaked at number 34 on the singles chart, selling 3.599 copies that week, and stayed on the chart for 3 weeks.

Chart (2008)	Peak position
Japan (Oricon)	34
