= Atarashii hibi =

2001 single by Puffy AmiYumi

Single by Puffy AmiYumi
- Released: 2001
- Genre: J-pop; Soft rock
- Producer(s): Andy Sturmer

Puffy AmiYumi singles chronology
| "Boogie Woogie No. 5" (2000) | "Atarashii hibi" (2001) | "Aoi Namida" (2001) |

Music video
- "Atarashii Hibi" on YouTube

"Atarashii Hibi" (あたらしい日々) is the 13th single released by Japanese pop duo Puffy AmiYumi. Puffy's first 21st century single was produced by Andy Sturmer and recorded in L.A.. It was used in the commercial starring the artists themselves. It includes 'Love So Pure', an English-language version of 'Sumire' whose original version was included in their 2000 album 'Spike'.

== List of songs ==
- Atarashii Hibi
- Tomodachi (Friends)
- Love so Pure
- Atarashii Hibi (Original Karaoke)

== Featured ==
- This song was featured on the compilation album Japan For Sale Vol.2
