= Yoshiharu =

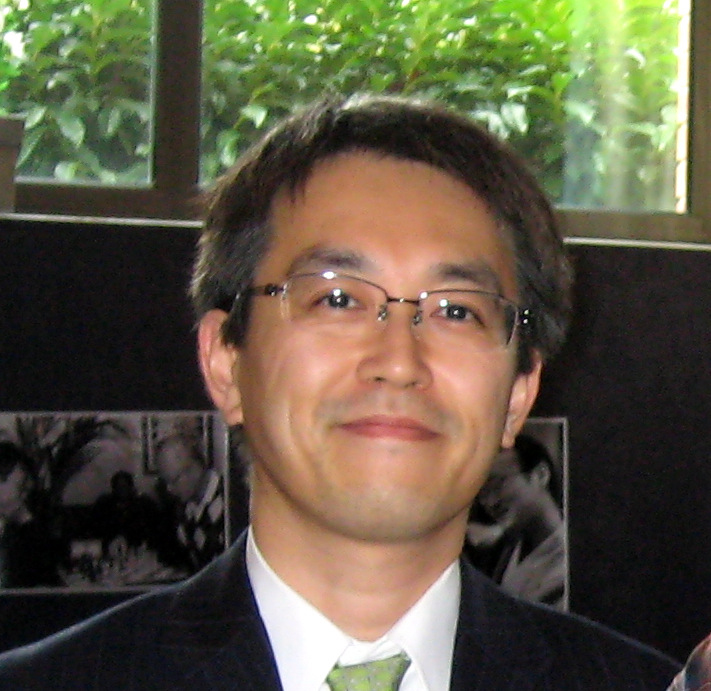
- Yoshiharu Habu, Japanese shogi player
- Pronunciation: joɕihaɾɯ (IPA)
- Gender: Male

Origin
- Origin: Japanese
- Meaning: Different meanings depending on the kanji used

Other names
- Alternative spelling: Yosiharu (Kunrei-shiki) Yosiharu (Nihon-shiki) Yoshiharu (Hepburn)

Yoshiharu is a masculine Japanese given name.

== Written forms ==
Yoshiharu can be written using many different combinations of kanji characters. Here are some examples:

- 義治, "justice, to manage"
- 義春, "justice, spring"
- 義温, "justice, to warm up"
- 吉治, "good luck, to manage"
- 吉春, "good luck, spring"
- 吉温, "good luck, to warm up"
- 善治, "virtuous, to manage"
- 善春, "virtuous, spring"
- 芳治, "virtuous/fragrant, to manage"
- 芳春, "virtuous/fragrant, spring"
- 良治, "good, to manage"
- 良春, "good, spring"
- 慶治, "congratulate, to manage"
- 由治, "reason, to manage"
- 与志治, "give, determination, to manage"
- 嘉治, "excellent, to manage"
- 嘉温, "excellent, to warm up"

The name can also be written in hiragana よしはる or katakana ヨシハル.

== Notable people with the name ==
- Yoshiharu Abe (阿部 義晴; born 1966), Japanese musician and record producer
- Yoshiharu Ashikaga (足利 義晴; 1511–1550), Japanese shōgun
- Yoshiharu Fukuhara (福原 吉春; 1942–1975), Japanese alpine skier
- Yoshiharu Habu (羽生 善治; born 1970), Japanese shogi and chess player
- Yoshiharu Horii (堀井 美晴; 1953–2025), Japanese football player and manager
- Yoshiharu Horio (堀尾 吉晴; 1542–1611), Japanese daimyō
- Yoshiharu Iwamoto (厳本 善治; 1863–1942), Japanese educator
- Yoshiharu Kohayakawa (小早川 美晴, born 1963), Japanese-Brazilian mathematician
- Yoshiharu Minami (南 喜陽, 1951–2024), Japanese judoka
- Yoshiharu Osaka (大阪 可治, born 1947), Japanese karateka
- Yoshiharu Sagara (相良 義陽; 1544–1581), Japanese daimyō
- Yoshiharu Sekino (関野 吉晴; born 1949), Japanese surgeon, explorer, travel writer, photographer and anthropologist
- Yoshiharu Tochiisami (栃勇 義治; born 1947), Japanese sumo wrestler
- Yoshiharu Tomonaga (友永 義治; born 1950), Japanese sprinter
- Yoshiharu Tsuge (つげ 義春; 1937–2026), Japanese cartoonist and essayist
- Yoshiharu Ueno (上野 良治; born 1973), Japanese footballer
- Yoshiharu Yamaguchi (山口 良治; 1943–2026), Japanese rugby union player
