= Umi e to =

Single by Puffy AmiYumi
- Released: April 5, 2000
- Genre: J-pop; Punk pop
- Songwriter: Tamio Okuda

Puffy AmiYumi singles chronology
"Yume no tame ni" (1999)	"Umi e to" (2000)	"Boogie Woogie No. 5" (2000)

Music video
- "Into the Beach (Umi Eto)" on YouTube

"Umi e to" (Into the Beach) is the 11th single released by Japanese pop duo Puffy AmiYumi on April 5, 2000.

== Track listing ==
1. Umi e to (words and music: Tamio Okuda)
2. Pool Nite (words and music: Tamio Okuda)
3. Umi e to [Original Karaoke]
4. Pool Nite [Original Karaoke]

== Chart performance ==
The single peaked at number 15 on the singles chart, selling 20.660 copies that week, and stayed on the chart for 3 weeks.

Chart (2000)	Peak position
Japan (Oricon)	15
