= Splurge =

Studio album by Puffy AmiYumi
- Released: June 28, 2006
- Genre: Pop, rock
- Label: Ki/oon Records (JA); KSCL-1010; Tofu Records (US); TOF-031

Puffy AmiYumi chronology
Hi Hi Puffy AmiYumi (2004)	Splurge (2006)	Honeycreeper (2007)

Professional ratings
Review scores
Source	Rating
AllMusic	4/5 stars

Splurge is a Japanese-language pop album by Puffy Amiyumi that was released on June 28, 2006 in Japan. It was released in the US on July 25, 2006, after their East Coast Tour.

On tracks 12 and 13, "Camel Country" and "Security Blanket", the vocal parts are sung by Yumi Yoshimura and Ami Onuki solo, respectively. A promo EP was released in Japan on July 25, 2006.

== Track listing ==
=== Japan release ===
Track naming from Japanese edition of album, with translated English in brackets.

1. "Radio Tokyo" (Butch Walker)
2. "ナイスバディ (Nice Buddy)" (lyrics: Puffy / music: Andy Sturmer and Andy Thompson)
3. "Tokyo I'm on My Way" (Dexter Holland)
4. "Shall We Dance?" (Butch Walker)
5. "恋のエチュード (Love's Etude)" (Masamune Kusano)
6. "女マシンガン (Girl Machine Gun)" (lyrics: Seiji / music: Jon Spencer)
7. "Sunday in the Park" (Charley Drayton, Tamio Okuda)
8. "モグラライク (Mole-Like)" (Tamio Okuda)
9. "Missing You Baby" (lyrics: Puffy / music: Andy Sturmer)
10. "早春物語 (Early Spring Story)" (lyrics: Puffy / music: Anders Hellgren & David Myhr)
11. "モグラ (Mole)" (Kohmoto Hiroto)
12. "らくだの国 (Camel Country/Camel Land)" (Kazuyoshi Saito)
13. "Security Blanket" (lyrics: Ami Onuki / music: Ken Yokoyama)
14. "はじまりのうた (Song of Origin/Beginnings)" (lyrics: Puffy / music: Andy Sturmer & Bleu)
15. "Basket Case" (lyrics: Billie Joe Armstrong / music: Green Day)

=== US release ===
1. "Call Me What You Like (If You Like Rock-n-Roll)"
2. "Nice Buddy"
3. "Tokyo I'm on My Way"
4. "Radio Tokyo"
5. "Mole-Like"
6. "Etude"
7. "Go Baby Power Now"
8. "Sunday in the Park"
9. "Missing You Baby"
10. "The Story"
11. "Mole"
12. "Cameland"
13. "Security Blanket"
14. "Beginnings"

Bonus tracks:

1. "Friends Forever ~FICKLE Remix~"
2. "Teen Titans Theme ~POLYSICS' CR-06 MIX~"

=== Splurge EP ===
1. Call Me What You Like
2. Security Blanket
3. Tokyo I'm On My Way
4. Go Baby Power Now
5. Basket Case

== Chart performance ==
In Japan it peaked at # 19 and stayed in the chart for 5 weeks, in the world chart peaked at number 9 and stayed in the chart for 2 weeks.

Chart (2006)	Peak position
Japanese Albums Chart	19
World Albums	9
