= Hiyori Hime =

Single by Puffy AmiYumi

from the album Bring It!
- Released: February 25, 2009
- Genre: Rock
- Label: Ki/oon Records
- Songwriter: Ringo Sheena
- Producer: Ringo Sheena

Puffy AmiYumi singles chronology
"My Story" (2008)	"Hiyori Hime" (2009)	"Dareka ga" (2009)

Music video
- "Hiyorihime" on YouTube

"Hiyori Hime" (日和姫; "Weather Princess") is the 27th single by Japanese pop duo Puffy AmiYumi, released on February 25, 2009. The song is used as the opening theme for the Fuji TV anime series Genji Monogatari Sennenki.

A limited edition of the single was released along with the regular edition. The limited edition features an extra live DVD showing footage of 4 songs from Puffy's 2007 honeysweeper tour at Shibuya-AX.

The song was written for Puffy by rock musician Ringo Sheena. Sheena self-covered the song in 2014 on her album Gyakuyunyū: Kōwankyoku.

== Track listing ==
=== CD ===
1. Hiyori Hime
2. Doki Doki
3. My Story [variation by argaph]

=== DVD ===
1. Kuchibiru Motion
2. Hataraku Otoko
3. Jet Keisatsu
4. True Asia
