= Koichi Kawanishi =

Japanese drummer (born 1959)

Koichi Kawanishi 川西 幸一
- Also known as: Koichi Nishikawa (西川 幸一, Nishikawa Kōichi)
- Born: October 20, 1959 (age 65); Kure, Hiroshima, Japan
- Genres: Rock, J-pop
- Occupation: Drummer
- Instrument: Drum
- Years active: 1987–present
- Labels: Sony Music Entertainment Japan (1987 – 1981); Sony Music Records (1992–1999); Ki/oon Music (2009 - )

Koichi Kawanishi (川西 幸一, Kawanishi Kōichi, born October 20, 1959, in Kure, Hiroshima, Japan) is a Japanese drummer who is a member of the Japanese band Unicorn.

== Works ==
=== Singles ===
Year	Title	Notes
1992	"Liquid Man"	

=== Mini albums ===
Year	Title	Notes
1993	Unicorn	In the name, Ebi Okuda Abe Nishikawa Tejima; Recorded "Tatsumaki Yarō"

=== Albums ===
Year	Title	Notes
2007	Koichi Kawanishi Self-selection	Released as 20th Anniversary of Unicorn's debut

=== 615 ===
- 2001–2002 – Guitar: Takeshiitsu Izawa, Bass: Nobuki Tokieda, Vocal: Yuhei

Title	Notes
"615 Demo Tape"	Limited distribution
"2002/4/6 615Tour Final Encore"	Lottery
