= The Night Begins to Shine =

Song from the Teen Titans Go! TV series

Single by B.E.R.

from the album Teen Titans Go! (Songs from The Night Begins to Shine Special)
- Written: 2005
- Released: October 30, 2015
- Recorded: 2013–2014
- Studio: Satellite Music Studios in Mount Kisco, New York and New York City, New York
- Genre: Synthwave; dance-rock; progressive house; new wave
- Length: 3:30
- Label: Telepictures
- Songwriters: Frank Enea, Carl Burnett, William J. Regan

B.E.R. singles chronology
"The Night Begins to Shine" (2015)	"Forever Mine" (2017)

Music video
- "The Night Begins to Shine" on YouTube

"The Night Begins to Shine" is a song by the band B.E.R. popularized by the Teen Titans Go! TV series. The song was originally co-written in 2005 and produced between 2013 and 2014 as an "'80s-style song" for a music library. The song was first featured in the Teen Titans Go! episode "Slumber Party" as a throwaway joke and it became popular with fans of the show. The song was subsequently featured in the episode "40%, 40%, 20%", and was prominently featured in two specials, the four-part 2017 special "The Day the Night Stopped Beginning to Shine and Became Dark Even Though It Was the Day" and a five-part sequel released in 2020, "The Night Begins to Shine 2".

The special also featured two other songs by B.E.R., "Forever Mine" and "Rise Up", as well as three covers of the song from Fall Out Boy, CeeLo Green, and Puffy AmiYumi. A spin-off series from Teen Titans Go! by Cartoon Network was announced in 2021, but as of 2026 no production updates on the project were announced.

== Soundtrack ==
The official soundtrack, Teen Titans Go! (Songs from The Night Begins to Shine Special), was released on July 28, 2017, through WaterTower Music and features music from the television special. All tracks are written by Carl Burnett, Frank Enea, and William J. Regan, except "Forever Mine", which was first written by Enea and rerecorded by B.E.R.

Teen Titans Go! (Songs from The Night Begins to Shine Specials)
No.	Title	Performer(s)	Length
1.	"The Night Begins to Shine"	CeeLo Green	3:39
2.	"Forever Mine"	B.E.R.	3:44
3.	"The Night Begins to Shine (Dragon Remix)"	B.E.R.	4:10
4.	"Rise Up"	B.E.R.	4:13
5.	"The Night Begins to Shine"	Puffy AmiYumi	3:50
6.	"You're the One"	B.E.R.	3:54
7.	"Chimerical"	B.E.R.	4:12
Total length:			28:06

== Commercial performance ==
Upon its official release, "The Night Begins to Shine" peaked at #23 on the Billboard Hot Rock & Alternative Songs chart and #7 on the Billboard Rock Digital Songs chart. The song also peaked at #66 on the iTunes music charts and #1 on the iTunes rock music charts. The song was covered by Fall Out Boy, CeeLo Green, and Puffy AmiYumi for a four-part Teen Titans Go! storyline. The soundtrack peaked at #8 on the Billboard Kid Albums chart, #17 on the Billboard Soundtracks chart, and #31 on the iTunes U.S. Albums chart.

== Weekly charts ==
=== Single ===
Chart (2017)	Peak position
US Hot Rock & Alternative Songs (Billboard)	23

=== Soundtrack ===
Chart (2017)	Peak position
US Kid Albums (Billboard)	8
US Soundtrack Albums (Billboard)	17
