= Kore ga Watashi no Ikiru Michi =

1996 single by Puffy AmiYumi

"Kore ga watashi no ikiru michi"

Single by Puffy

from the album Jet-CD
- Released: 1996
- Genre: J-pop
- Songwriter: Tamio Okuda

Puffy singles chronology
"Asia no junshin" (1996)	"Kore ga watashi no ikiru michi" (1996)	"Circuit no Musume" (1997)

Music video
- "That's the Way It Is (Korega Watashino Ikiru Michi)" on YouTube "That's the Way It Is (Visual R Ver.)" on YouTube

"Kore ga Watashi no Ikiru Michi" (これが私の生きる道; "This Is the Way That I Live") is the 2nd single released by the Japanese pop duo Puffy AmiYumi on October 7, 1996. It sold over 1.5 million copies and was their first #1 hit. They won "Japan Record Award for Best New Artist" in 1996.

It is known in American releases as being titled '"That's the Way It Is"' in An Illustrated History and the album Hi Hi Puffy AmiYumi, although not a direct translation of the song title.

A Mandarin version of the song was released as a single in China and Taiwan in late 1998 and can be found on their compilation album The Very Best of Puffy/amiyumi Jet Fever. A remix of this version is also on their 2003 remix album PRMX Turbo.

== Track listing ==
1. "Kore ga Watashi no Ikirumichi" (Monaural)
2. "Yuki ga Furu Machi" (Unicorn cover)
3. "Kore ga Watashi no Ikirumichi" (Stereo Karaoke)
4. "Yuki ga Furu Machi" (Original Karaoke)

== Phrases and harmonies ==
"Kore ga Watashi no Ikirumichi" is filled with phrases and harmonies of The Beatles and The Who.

In 2012, Tamio Okuda explained it in the magazine PEN's interview featured the Beatles:

"I thought it would be fun if women played a song as a parody of the Beatles a little bit. If I played it, it would only become a song that was merely parodied by the man who liked the Beatles. But I thought it would be OK if Puffy played it."
("あれは、女の人がちょっとビートルズのパロディ的な曲をやるっていうのも、面白いかもしれないと思って。僕がやったら、ただ好きなヤツがパロディにしたっていうだけになっちゃうけど、あいつらならいいかと")

== Chart performance ==
The song became the first Puffy single to debut at number 1, selling 402,920 copies that week (until date, Puffy's biggest first-week sales of a single); the track stayed for another two weeks at the top of the chart and became Puffy's longest reign at number one, selling 735,230 copies only in its first three weeks; it stayed nine non-consecutive weeks at the top 10. The song remained for 16 weeks on the chart and sold 1,566,060 copies, Puffy's biggest selling single. On the J-Wave chart, the song debuted at number 85 and in its fifth week peaked at number 12; it remained on the chart for 20 weeks, Puffy's longest run on the chart.

=== Oricon Sales Chart ===
Chart (1996)	Peak position
Japan (Oricon)	1

=== J-Wave Airplay Chart ===
Chart (1996)	Peak position
J-Wave Tokio Hot 100	12

== Certifications ==
Region	Provider	Certification (sales thresholds)
Japan	RIAJ	Million

== In popular culture ==
- "Kore ga watashi no ikiru michi" was featured in the Japan-only game Donkey Konga 3.
  - A chiptune rendition also appeared in the Japan-only Sega Pico game Minna de Karaoke! Issho ni Utaou Suki na Uta!.
  - It also appeared in a rhythm minigame the Japanese version of Rayman Raving Rabbids 2 where it replaced "A Teenager in Love".
- The song also featured in the pilot episode of the television series Heroes and a remix appeared in the French/Japanese action film Wasabi.
- Parts of the song were notable for being used in a 1996 commercial for Japanese brand Tessera 'Juicy-Juicy' shampoo.
- The song was used for the ending theme of the anime television adaptation of ReLIFE, Episode 05, "Overlap", in July, 2016 and for the opening theme of the anime movie Sound! Euphonium: The Movie – Our Promise: A Brand New Day.
