= Kazuyoshi Saito =

Japanese singer-songwriter (born 1966)

- Also known as: Saito Sitone (斉藤シトーン, Saitō Shitōn)
- Born: June 22, 1966 (age 60); Mibu, Tochigi, Japan
- Genres: Rock, folk rock
- Occupations: Musician, singer-songwriter
- Instruments: Vocals, guitar, bass, drums, keyboards
- Years active: 1992–present
- Labels: Funhouse, Speedstar
- Website: Official site

Kazuyoshi Saito (Japanese: 斉藤和義, Hepburn: Saitō Kazuyoshi; born June 22, 1966) is a Japanese singer-songwriter. After he made his professional debut in 1993, his popularity exploded in 2007 after 15 years in the music industry. He is also one-half of the rock duo Mannish Boys with Tatsuya Nakamura, a member of the supergroup the Curling Sitones (カーリングシトーンズ, Kāringu Shitōnzu), and one-half of the duo Okamura Kazuyoshi (岡村和義) with Yasuyuki Okamura. In 2013, Saito became the first Japanese musician to have a signature model acoustic guitar with Gibson. As of 2020, he had six signature models with them and one with Epiphone.

== Early life ==
Saito was born to parents who worked for a toy maker in Mibu, Tochigi. He has two sisters, one older and one younger. He started playing with a guitar in elementary school. Due to his elder sister's influence, in junior high and high school he became addicted to hard rock acts like the Michael Schenker Group, Kiss, Aerosmith, Van Halen and AC/DC. Around the same time, he was in a Loudness cover band. Saito graduated from Sakushin Gakuin high school. He dropped out of Yamanashi Gakuin University.

== Career ==
=== 1992–2012: Early career and later popularity ===
In 1992, Saito appeared on the TBS audition TV show Seiki Roku Wagayateki Denshi Miyake Yūji no Tenka Gomen!. He made his professional debut in August 1993 with the single "Boku no Mita Beatles wa TV no Naka" on BMG's Funhouse record label, and had his first one-man concert at Nissin Power Station on September 17. His first album, Aoi Sora no Shita..., followed on September 26, 1993. Saito's 1994 song "Aruite Kaerō" was used in the Fuji TV children's show Hirake! Ponkikki. His fourth album Fire Dog was released in February 1996. 15 years later, its song "Sora ni Hoshi ga Kirei" was chosen to be the theme of the 2009 film Kichijōji no Asahina-kun. Saito's first release to reach the top-ten on the Oricon music charts was his 1997 album Dilemma. His seventh album, March 2000's Cold Tube, was his first after switching record labels to Victor's Speedstar. In 2006, Saito and other musicians born in 1966 performed under the name Roots66 for an event put together by FM802.

After 15 years in the music business, Saito's popularity exploded between 2007 and 2008. In 2007, his songs "Wedding Song" and "Ai ni Kite" were hits after being featured in popular TV commercials. The same thing happened with "Ya Mujō" and "Otsukare-sama no Kuni" the following year, with the former going on to win an Excellent Work Award at the 50th Japan Record Awards. Saito's March 2007 album Kurenai-ban is officially labelled a "concept album" because the songs are all about love. With few exceptions, it is mainly composed of covers of songs by other artists. His 12th studio album I Love Me was released in October 2007. The August 2008 compilation Utautai 15 Singles Best 1993–2007 reached fourth place on the Oricon Albums Chart. Music news websites reported that another reason for the late success was that celebrities, including some of which grew up listening to his music, were publicly praising Saito, such as Ryo Nishikido, Riko Narumi, Kazutoshi Sakurai and Puffy.

Saito covered "Hells Bells" for the March 2008 AC/DC tribute album Thunder Tracks. He has made guest appearances with the rock band Lazy since 2008. He is a featured artist on the 2009 version of their 1980 song "Kanjite Knight" for the TV show Shin Mazinger Shōgeki! Z Hen!. Saito composed the music to "Niji ga Kieru Made", which Kyōko Koizumi sang as the theme of the 2009 film Honokaa Boy. His song "Don't Worry Be Happy" was a theme song of the variety show Mezanyu~, while "Ai no Akari" was the theme of the TV drama Limit -Keiji no Genba 2-. At Nishikido's request, Saito wrote the title track for his band Kanjani Eight's album Puzzle. He also wrote "Hare Onna" for Puffy's 2009 album Bring It!. Saito's album Tsuki ga Noboreba was released in September 2009, and includes "Phoenix" which he wrote in memoriam Kiyoshiro Imawano. For Fumiya Fujii's 2009 album F's Cinema, Saito wrote the song "Tsumihoroboshi".

Saito provided vocals to "Kimi to Boku 2010" for Tokyo Ska Paradise Orchestra's 2010 album World Ska Symphony. His own album, Are You Ready?, was released in October 2010 and won an Excellent Work Award at the 52nd Japan Record Awards. His music video for "Zutto Suki Datta", which recreated The Beatles' rooftop concert, later won Best Male Video at the 2011 Space Shower Music Video Awards.

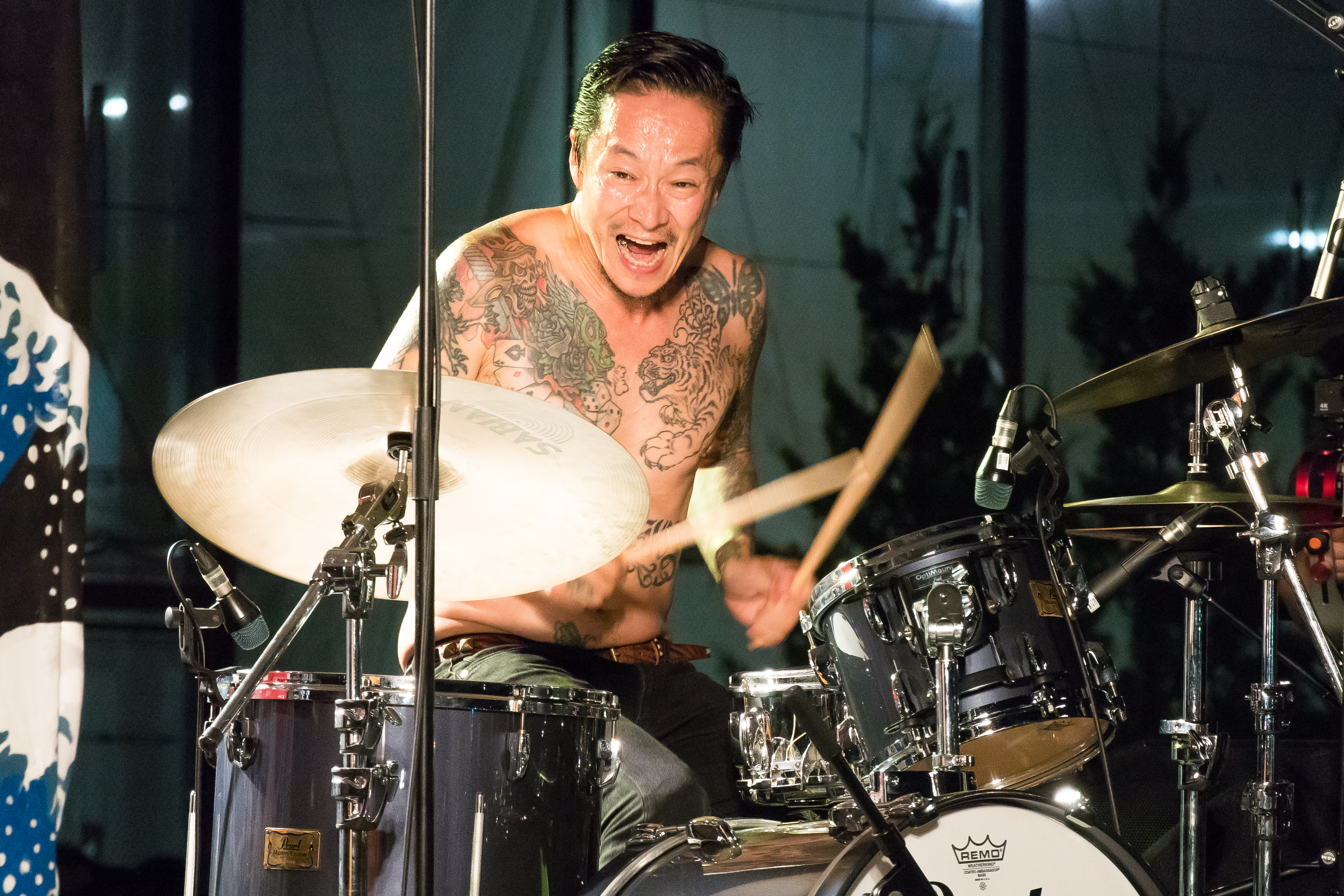
Saito teamed up with Tatsuya Nakamura to form the duo Mannish Boys in 2013.

Saito covered "Uguisu" for the 2011 Reichi Nakaido tribute album OK!!! C'mon Chabo!!!, and recorded a duet version of his own 1994 song "Aruite Kaerō" in French with Clémentine for her album Zoku Animentine. In June 2011, Saito formed the rock duo Mannish Boys with drummer Tatsuya Nakamura. They had their first concert at the Join Alive music festival on July 24, and their second at the Fuji Rock Festival on July 31. Saito's October 2011 album 45 Stones includes two songs written with Nakamura and his own version of "Niji ga Kieru Made". It reached number two on the Oricon, sold 28,000 copies in its first week, and was supported by a 42-date national tour. Saito wrote and performed "Yasashiku Naritai" to be the ending theme of the 2011 TV drama Kaseifu no Mita. It has sold over 2.5 million physical and digital copies, making it one of the best-selling singles in Japan. That year he also wrote the number one single "Boku no Hanbun" for the boy band SMAP.

Saito is a featured guest on "Naraku to Sōshitsu Kibō to Yume" from Number the.'s January 2012 album Night Songs, and covered "Angel" for the Imawano tribute album King of Songwriter ~Songs of Kiyoshiro Covers~. He wrote his May 2012 single "Gekkō" to be the theme of the TV drama Kazoku no Uta, and composed the music to "(500) Nichi no Magic" for Halcali's album Halcali no Okawari. Saito recorded his own version of "Hare Onna" for the July Puffy tribute album Puffy Covers. Mannish Boys released their first album, Ma! Ma! Ma! Mannish Boys!!!, on September 19, 2012. That same day Saito released the special album One Night Acoustic Recording Session at NHK CR-509 Studio, which as the title suggests is a studio live album recorded in a single night. Under the pseudonym Saitō Maraemon (齋藤摩羅衛門), he is a featured guest on "Himegimi Shake!" from Rekishi's December album Rekimi. "Yasashiku Naritai" won an Excellent Work Award at the 54th Japan Record Awards, and Saito performed it at the 63rd NHK Kōhaku Uta Gassen at the end of the year.

=== 2013–2018: Continued success and anniversaries ===
Saito marked his 20th anniversary as a professional musician in 2013 and held his first arena tour to 35,000 people. He wrote "One More Time" to be the theme of the anime film Detective Conan: Private Eye in the Distant Sea, and "Kagerō" for the live-action film adaptation of Kiyoku Yawaku. He released two studio albums that year, Saito and Kazuyoshi. The former collects the singles he released since 45 Stones and his own versions of two songs he wrote for other artists, "Puzzle" and "Tsumihoroboshi", while the latter album is all new material. They reached numbers 2 and 3 on the Oricon, respectively. The albums' tour featured 62 performances in 55 cities and mobilized 140,000 people. Throughout the year, Saito also collaborated with Takashi Hamazaki on "Detarame" for his January 2013 album Gachi × Dachi, with Ren Takada on "Machi Bōke" for his June album Ensemble, and with Kaela Kimura on a cover of "Crazy Little Thing Called Love" for her October album Rock.

Mannish Boys released their second album, Mu? Mu? Mu? Mannish Boys!!!, in September 2014 and went on their first one-man tour. Saito wrote, produced and performed all the instruments on "Player" for Mari Natsuki to sing as the ending theme of the anime Ronja, the Robber's Daughter. He also collaborated with Shinobu Otake on a cover of Miyuki Nakajima's "Kitsune Kari no Uta" for Otake's December 2014 album Utagokoro Koigokoro.

Saito wrote "Jun Ai" for Masayuki Suzuki to be included on his March 2015 compilation All Time Best ~Martini Dictionary~. He also composed, produced, co-wrote and is featured on Kavka Shishido's 2015 song "Don't Be Love". Saito covered "Shiroi Parasol" by Seiko Matsuda for the Takashi Matsumoto tribute album Kazemachi de Aimashō. He is a featured musician on "(Just Like) Starting Over" and "Mō Ichido Sekai o Kaeru no Sa (Album Ver.)" from Theatre Brook's July 2015 album Love Changes the World. Saito's October 2015 album To the End of the Wind was recorded in Los Angeles with musicians such as Darryl Jones, Money Mark and Charley Drayton, and reached number two on the charts. He held a 62-date national tour from November 2015 to May 2016.

Saito appears on two songs from Ohashi Trio's February 2016 album 10 (Ten), providing guitar on "Ai de Kimi wa Kirei ni Naru" and featured vocals on "Koisuru Rider". He wrote and is featured on "Don't Cry Baby" from Toko Furuuchi's March 2016 album Toko Furuuchi with 10 Legends. After 10 years, Roots66 was revived with many more participating musicians for three performances in March and April 2016. Saito wrote "Muddy Water" to be the theme of the TV drama Fukigen'na Kajitsu, and "Ikisaki wa Mirai" to be the theme of the film Samurai Hustle Returns. In October 2016, Mannish Boys released their third album Uruwashi no Furasuka.

Saito wrote, co-composed and features on "Zatchunōza" for Special Others' March 2017 album Special Others II. His 1997 song "Utautai no Ballad" was chosen to be the theme song of the May 2017 anime film Lu over the Wall. He wrote "Iden" for the TV drama Gekokujō Juken and "I'm a Dreamer" for the drama Izakaya Fuji, which is about an actual izakaya that he knew. As Roots66, Saito and 26 other musicians recorded the song "Let's Go! Muttsugo! ~Rokushoku no Niji~" to be an ending theme of Mr. Osomatsu in October. Saito covered "Tasogare My Love" for the November 2017 Yū Aku tribute album Chikyū no Otoko ni Akita Tokoro yo ~Aku Yū Respect Album.

Saito's March 2018 album Toys Blood Music, which he recorded almost entirely by himself, became his first number one record. Its national tour featured 47 performances in 41 cities. Saito covered Elephant Kashimashi's "Kakedasu Otoko" for the Elephant Kashimashi Cover Album 3 ~A Tribute to The Elephant Kashimashi~. To celebrate his 25th anniversary, he held a nine-date anniversary tour and released the compilation album Utautai 25 Singles Best 2008–2017 in July. On July 11, 2018, Saito, Yohito Teraoka (Jun Sky Walkers), Tamio Okuda, Takashi Hamazaki (Flying Kids), Yo-King (Magokoro Brothers) and Tortoise Matsumoto announced the formation of a supergroup called the Curling Sitones. Each member is a multi-instrumentalist with all of them at-least being able to provide vocals and guitar and, like the Traveling Wilburys, each uses a pseudonym featuring "Sitone"; Saito goes by Saito Sitone (斉藤シトーン, Saitō Shitōn). They formed for a concert on September 23, 2018, at Zepp Tokyo celebrating Teraoka's 25th anniversary as a musician.

=== 2018–present: Okamura Kazuyoshi ===
Saito wrote the lyrics to and is featured on "Mystery Train" and "Hana Ichi Monme" from Yoshitaka Minami's September 2018 album Dear My Generation. On November 8, Saito organized a concert at Zepp Diver City featuring numerous other musicians such as his Curling Sitones bandmates, Chara, Yōko Oginome, Yasuyuki Okamura and Sakura Fujiwara where the proceeds went to reconstruction from the 2018 Japan floods. Saito wrote "Color" for the 2018 film Kazokuiro -Railways Watashi-tachi no Shuppatsu-.

Mannish Boys released an EP titled Naked in January 2019. Saito wrote "Are" to be the theme of the TV drama Your Home is My Business! 2nd Attack, and co-composed "Beautiful Dreams" for Kemuri vocalist Fumio Ito's March 2019 album Friendship. He also played guitar on "Okusoko no Uta" from Takehara Pistol's September album It's My Life. Using lyrics that Momoko Sakura wrote about him before she died, Saito composed "Itsumo no Fūkei" to be an ending theme of the anime adaptation of Sakura's Chibi Maruko-chan. Saito wrote nine songs for the musical Rockabilly Jack by Yukinojo Mori. The Curling Sitones' first album Hyojo no Rogue was released in November 2019. Their song "Suberi Shirazu Shirazu" was named the theme song of the 2020 Japan Curling Championships, the first ever in the competition's history.

Saito's 20th studio album 202020 was released in January 2020. That year, he wrote "Junpu" to be the theme song of Junji Takada's TV show Jun Sanpo. Saito's next album, 55 Stones, was released in March 2021. Pineapple followed in April 2023, with its English-language title track that features Sakura Fujiwara. On December 25, 2023, it was announced that Saito had formed the duo Okamura Kazuyoshi with Yasuyuki Okamura. One of impetuses for the group was when Saito appeared on Okamura's NHK Radio 1 show Okamura Yasuyuki no Come On Everybody in January 2020 and the two improvised a song together on the spot. "I Miss Your Fire" was released digitally on January 17, 2024, and was followed by "Haru, Hakudaku" on February 14, which is based on the improvised song from 2020. Their first album, Wakaba, was released on May 16. Their first tour began on the same day and saw them play 12 shows in eight cities. Okamura Kazuyoshi won Best Collaboration at the 2024 GQ Men of the Year Awards.

== Personal life ==
Saito married a woman of the same age, who works as a writer, in 1995. After 15 years of marriage, they had their first child, a boy, on June 3, 2010.

Saito has collaborated several times with author Kōtarō Isaka. Isaka quit his company job and focused on writing after hearing Saito's 1997 song "Kōfuku na Chōshoku Taikutsu na Yūshoku". The author wrote the 2007 short story "Eine Kleine" after receiving a request for song lyrics from Saito, and a character in it is named after the musician. Saito wrote the song "Very Very Strong -Eine Kleine-" based on the story, and Isaka then wrote a story titled "Light Heavy" in response that was included with the limited edition of the single. When Eine Kleine Nachtmusik, the Isaka collection that includes the two previously mentioned stories and others, was adapted into a film in 2019, Saito provided its music. Saito previously provided music to the film adaptations of Isaka's Fish Story, Golden Slumber and Potechi.

== Discography ==
=== Studio albums ===
Year	Album details	Peak chart positions		
Year	Album details	JPN Oricon	JPN Billboard Top	JPN Billboard Hot
1993	Aoi Sora no Shita... (青い空の下…): Released: September 26, 1993	—	—	—
1994	Suteki na Nioi no Sekai (素敵な匂いの世界): Released: March 24, 1994	60	—	—
1995	Wonderful Fish: Released: February 1, 1995	28	—	—
1996	Fire Dog: Released: February 28, 1996	14	—	—
1997	Dilemma (ジレンマ): Released: February 26, 1997	8	—	—
1997	Because: Released: December 26, 1997	19	—	—
2000	Cold Tube: Released: March 23, 2000	18	—	—
2002	35 Stones: Released: January 17, 2002	12	—	—
2003	Nowhere Land: Released: March 26, 2003	41	—	—
2004	Seishun Blues (青春ブルース): Released: April 21, 2004	18	—	—
2006	Oretachi no Rock 'n Roll (俺たちのロックンロール): Released: June 21, 2006	13	—	—
2007	I Love Me (stylized as I ♥ ME): Released: October 17, 2007	7	—	—
2009	Tsuki ga Noboreba (月が昇れば): Released: September 16, 2009	7	9	—
2010	Are You Ready?: Released: October 27, 2010	7	8	—
2011	45 Stones: Released: October 19, 2011	2	2	—
2013	Saito (斉藤): Released: October 23, 2013	2	3	—
2013	Kazuyoshi (和義): Released: October 23, 2013	3	5	—
2015	To the End of the Wind (風の果てまで, Kaze no Hate Made): Released: October 28, 2015	2	2	2
2018	Toys Blood Music: Released: March 14, 2018	1	1	3
2020	202020: Released: January 29, 2020	4	5	6
2021	55 Stones: Released: March 24, 2021	5	4	4
2023	Pineapple: Released: April 12, 2023	6	5	5
2026	Nichijo Days (日常Days, Nichijō Deizu): Released: September 9, 2026	14	—	—
"—" denotes a recording released before the creation of the Billboard chart, or that did not chart.

=== Mini-albums ===
Year	Album details	Peak chart positions
Year	Album details	JPN Oricon
2000	Half: Released: November 29, 2000	37

=== Singles ===
Year	Single details	Peak chart positions	
Year	Single details	JPN Oricon	JPN Billboard Hot 100
1993	"Boku no Mita Beatles wa TV no Naka" (僕の見たビートルズはTVの中): Released: August 25, 1993	—	—
1993	"Rain Rain Rain": Released: November 26, 1993	—	—
1994	"Kimi no Kao ga Suki da" (君の顔が好きだ): Released: February 2, 1994	—	—
1994	"Aruite Kaerō" (歩いて帰ろう): Released: June 1, 1994	60	—
1994	"Kanojo" (彼女): Released: September 24, 1994	—	—
1994	"Déjà Vu": Released: November 23, 1994	67	—
1995	"Post ni Mayonnaise" (ポストにマヨネーズ): Released: March 1, 1995	—	—
1995	"Tōri ni Tateba" (通りに立てば): Released: June 25, 1995	—	—
1995	"Daijōbu" (大丈夫): Released: October 4, 1995	48	—
1996	"Sora ni Hoshi ga Kirei" (空に星が綺麗): Released: January 1, 1996	78	—
1996	"Sabaku ni Akai Hana" (砂漠に赤い花): Released: February 1, 1996	90	—
1996	"Baby, I Love You": Released: August 21, 1996	87	—
1997	"Kyōshū" (郷愁): Released: January 22, 1997	47	—
1997	"Kōfuku na Chōshoku Taikutsu na Yūshoku" (幸福な朝食 退屈な夕食): Released: April 9, 1997	—	—
1997	"Utautai no Ballad" (歌うたいのバラッド): Released: November 21, 1997	91	—
1998	"Hey! Mr. Angryman": Released: February 1, 1998	—	—
1998	"Sofa" (ソファ): Released: December 2, 1998	34	—
2000	"Ageha" (アゲハ): Released: February 23, 2000	44	—
2001	"Gekiteki na Shunkan" (劇的な瞬間): Released: July 25, 2001	40	—
2001	"Rocket" (ロケット): Released: October 24, 2001	49	—
2001	"Tsuki no Mukōgawa" (月の向こう側): Released: December 5, 2001	50	—
2002	"Yawaraka no Hi" (やわらかな日): Released: November 20, 2002	43	—
2003	"Yorokobi no Uta" (喜びの唄): Released: March 5, 2003	72	—
2004	"Bokura no Rule" (ぼくらのルール): Released: March 24, 2004	82	—
2004	"Mayonaka no Pool" (真夜中のプール): Released: August 25, 2004	42	—
2004	"Yakusoku no Juunigatsu/Dareka no Fuyu no Uta" (約束の十二月/誰かの冬の歌): Released: November 17, 2004	48	—
2005	"Sekai wo Shiroku Nure!" (世界を白くぬれ！): Released: January 29, 2005 (limited release at Ski Jam Katsuyama)	—	—
2005	"Fly ~Ai no Tsuzuki wa Bonjour!~" (FLY〜愛の続きはボンジュール!〜): Released: October 19, 2005	37	—
2006	"Humming Bird" (ハミングバード): Released: May 24, 2006	55	—
2006	"Yabureta Kasa ni Kuchizuke wo" (破れた傘にくちづけを): Released: October 20, 2006	—	—
2007	"Wedding Song" (ウエディング・ソング): Released: January 24, 2007	16	—
2007	"Kimi wa Boku no Nani wo Suki ni Nattandarou/Very Very Strong -Eine Kleine-" (君は僕のなにを好きになったんだろう/ベリー ベリー ストロング〜アイネクライネ〜): Released: June 20, 2007	20	—
2007	"Niji" (虹): Released: September 5, 2007	44	—
2008	"Ya Mujō" (やぁ 無情): Released: September 17, 2008	10	9
2008	"Otsukare-sama no Kuni" (おつかれさまの国): Released: December 3, 2008	13	10
2009	"Don't Worry Be Happy" (ドント・ウォーリー・ビー・ハッピー): Released: May 6, 2009	19	12
2009	"Come On!": Released: August 5, 2009	16	16
2010	"Zutto Suki Datta" (ずっと好きだった): Released: April 21, 2010	8	5
2011	"Yasashiku Naritai" (やさしくなりたい): Released: November 2, 2011	6	4
2012	"Gekkō" (月光): Released: May 2, 2012	10	3
2013	"One More Time" (ワンモアタイム): Released: April 17, 2013	9	5
2013	"Always": Released: September 18, 2013	10	7
2013	"Kagerō" (かげろう): Released: October 16, 2013	12	14
2015	"Semete Ikoze!/Kizuguchi" (攻めていこーぜ!/傷口): Released: September 2, 2015	16	22
2016	"Muddy Water" (マディウォーター): Released: June 8, 2016	11	13
2017	"Iden" (遺伝): Released: February 22, 2017	15	14
2018	"Color" (カラー): Released: November 28, 2018	17	46
2019	"Are" (アレ): Released: February 20, 2019	17	46
2019	"Itsumo no Fūkei" (いつもの風景): Released: November 20, 2019	29	—
"—" denotes a recording released before the creation of the Billboard chart, or that did not chart.

=== Compilation albums ===
Year	Album details	Peak chart positions		
Year	Album details	JPN Oricon	JPN Billboard Top	JPN Billboard Hot
1998	Golden Delicious: Released: December 2, 1998	11	—	—
2000	Collection "B": Released: May 24, 2000	38	—	—
2005	Shiro-ban (白盤): Released: December 7, 2005	27	—	—
2005	Kuro-ban (黒盤): Released: December 7, 2005	40	—	—
2008	Utautai 15 Singles Best 1993–2007 (歌うたい15 SINGLES BEST 1993〜2007): Released: August 6, 2008	4	4	—
2008	Collection "B" 1993–2007: Released: September 17, 2008	21	23	—
2018	Utautai 25 Singles Best 2008–2017 (歌うたい25 SINGLES BEST 2008～2017): Released: July 25, 2018	4	3	5
"—" denotes a recording released before the creation of the Billboard chart.

=== Live albums ===
Year	Album details	Peak chart positions		
Year	Album details	JPN Oricon	JPN Billboard Top	JPN Billboard Hot
1999	Juuni Gatsu (十二月): Released: June 2, 1999	26	—	—
1999	Golden Delicious Hour: Released: June 2, 1999	30	—	—
2002	Juuni Gatsu ~Winter Caravan Strings~ (十二月 〜Winter Caravan Strings〜): Released: March 20, 2002	46	—	—
2005	Hikigatari Juuni Gatsu in Budokan ~Seishun Blues Kanketsu-hen~ (弾き語り 十二月 in 武道館 〜青春ブルース完結編〜): Released: March 16, 2005	64	—	—
2010	Saito "Hikigatari" Kazuyoshi Live Tour 2009 ≫ 2010 Juuni Gatsu in Osaka-jo Hall ~Tsuki ga Noboreba Hikigataru~ (斉藤“弾き語り”和義 ライブツアー2009≫2010 十二月 in 大阪城ホール 〜月が昇れば 弾き語る〜): Released: March 24, 2010	23	54	—
2013	Kazuyoshi Saito 20th Anniversary Live 1993–2013 "20<21" ~Korekara mo Yorochikubi~ at Kobe World Kinen Hall 2013.8.25 (Kazuyoshi Saito 20th Anniversary Live 1993-2013“20<21” ～これからもヨロチクビ～ at 神戸ワールド記念ホール 2013.8.25): Released: December 25, 2013	18	17	—
2015	Kazuyoshi Saito Tour 2014 "Rumble Horses" Live at Zepp Tokyo 2014.12.12: Released: March 18, 2015	23	23	—
2016	Kazuyoshi Saito Live Tour 2015–2016 "To the End of the Wind" Live at Nippon Budokan 2016.5.22 (KAZUYOSHI SAITO LIVE TOUR 2015-2016 ‟風の果てまで” Live at 日本武道館 2016.5.22): Released: September 21, 2016	16	14	33
2017	Kazuyoshi Saito Hikigatari Tour 2017 "Singing in the Rain" Live at Nakano Sunplaza 2017.06.21 (斉藤和義 弾き語りツアー 2017 “雨に歌えば” Live at 中野サンプラザ 2017.06.21): Released: October 25, 2017	19	19	31
2018	Kazuyoshi Saito Live Tour 2018 Toys Blood Music Live at Yamanashi Collany Bunka Hall 2018.06.02: Released: November 28, 2018	33	28	46
2019	Kazuyoshi Saito 25th Anniversary Live 1993–2018 25＜26 ~Korekara mo Yorochiku Bīchiku~ Live at Nippon Budokan 2018.09.07 (KAZUYOSHI SAITO 25th Anniversary Live 1993-2018 25＜26 ～これからもヨロチクビーチク～ Live at 日本武道館 2018.09.07): Released: March 20, 2019	28	27	54
2019	Kazuyoshi Saito Hikigatari Tour 2019 "Time in the Garage" Live at Nakano Sun Plaza 2019.06.13 (斉藤和義 弾き語りツアー 2019 “Time in the Garage” Live at 中野サンプラザ 2019.06.13): Released: November 20, 2019	24	19	39
2021	Kazuyoshi Saito Live Tour 2020 "202020" Maboroshi no Setlist de 2-kakan Kaisai! ~Banjikyūsu mo Kishikaisei~ Live at Nakano Sunplaza Hall 2021.4.28 (KAZUYOSHI SAITO LIVE TOUR 2020 "202020" 幻のセットリストで2日間開催!～万事休すも起死回生～ Live at 中野サンプラザホール 2021.4.28): Released: October 27, 2021	41	40	49
2022	Kazuyoshi Saito Live Tour 2021 "202020 & 55 Stones" Live at Tokyo International Forum 2021.10.31: Released: October 5, 2022	21	19	31
2023	Kazuyoshi Saito Hikigatari Tour "Juuni Gatsu~2022" Live at Nippon Budokan 2022.12.21 (斉藤和義 弾き語りツアー「十二月〜2022」Live at 日本武道館 2022.12.21): Released: August 30, 2023	31	26	27
2023	Kazuyoshi Saito Live Tour 2023 Pineapple Express ~Ashita Daisuki na Rock 'n Roll Band ga Kono Machi ni Yattekuru nda~ (KAZUYOSHI SAITO LIVE TOUR 2023 PINEAPPLE EXPRESS ～明日大好きなロックンロールバンドがこの街にやってくるんだ～): Released: December 20, 2023	41	39	42
2024	Kazuyoshi Saito 30th Anniversary Live 1993–2023 30<31 ~Korekara mo Yorochiku Beam~ Live at Tokyo International Forum 2023.09.22 (KAZUYOSHI SAITO 30th Anniversary Live 1993-2023 30＜31 〜これからもヨロチクビーム〜 Live at 東京国際フォーラム2023.09.22): Released: March 27, 2024	22	21	25
2025	Kazuyoshi Saito Live Tour 2024 "Seishun 58 Kippu" ~Trio de Pon~ Live at Zepp Haneda 2024.11.09 (斉藤和義ライブツアー2024 “青春58きっぷ”〜Trio de Pon〜 Live at Zepp Haneda 2024.11.09): Released: March 26, 2025	42	42	—
"—" denotes a recording released before the creation of the Billboard chart, or that did not chart.

=== Other albums ===
Year	Album details	Peak chart positions	
Year	Album details	JPN Oricon	JPN Billboard Top
1995	Wonderful Mix: Released: March 15, 1995; Note: Remix album	—	—
2007	Kurenai-ban (紅盤): Released: March 21, 2007; Note: Concept album	13	—
2012	One Night Acoustic Recording Session at NHK CR-509 Studio: Released: September 19, 2012; Note: Concept album	16	17
2023	Rock'n Roll Recording Session at Victor Studio 301: Released: July 26, 2023; Note: Concept album	12	11
"—" denotes a recording released before the creation of the Billboard chart, or that did not chart.

== Videography ==
Year	Album details	Peak chart positions	
Year	Album details	JPN Oricon DVDs	JPN Oricon Blu-rays
1995	Video Clips Vol. I Kimi no Kao ga Suki da (VIDEO CLIPS Vol.I 君の顔が好きだ): Released: September 1, 1995	—	—
1996	Video Clips Vol. II Rōjin no Uta (VIDEO CLIPS Vol.II 老人の歌): Released: March 15, 1996	—	—
1997	Live Tour '97 Utae Namakemono (LIVE TOUR '97 歌え なまけもの): Released: September 26, 1997	—	—
1998	Video Clips Vol. III Utautai no Ballad (VIDEO CLIPS Vol.III 歌うたいのバラッド): Released: December 2, 1998	—	—
2002	Kazuyoshi Saito Live Tour 2002 35 Stones: Released: November 20, 2002	—	—
2004	Video Clips Vol. IV Bokura no Rule (VIDEO CLIPS Vol.IV ぼくらのルール): Released: May 19, 2004	—	—
2005	Hikigatari Juuni Gatsu in Budokan ~Seishun Blues Kanketsu-hen~: Released: March 16, 2005	—	—
2005	Video Clips '93–'98: Released: June 29, 2005	—	—
2008	Clips Best 1993–2007: Released: September 17, 2008	32	—
2009	Live Tour 2008 Utautai 15＜16 Live at Zepp Tokyo 2008.12.11 (LIVE TOUR 2008 歌うたい15＜16 Live at ZEPP TOKYO 2008.12.11): Released: March 25, 2009	45	—
2010	Saito "Hikigatari" Kazuyoshi Live Tour 2009 ≫ 2010 Juuni Gatsu in Osaka-jo Hall ~Tsuki ga Noboreba Hikigataru~: Released: March 24, 2010	23	—
2010	Kazuyoshi Saito Live Tour 2009≫2010 "Tsuki ga Noboreba" at Nippon Budokan 2010.3.5 (斉藤和義 ライブツアー2009≫2010 "月が昇れば" at 日本武道館 2010.3.5): Released: May 26, 2010	13	—
2011	Kazuyoshi Saito Live Tour 2010 Stupid Spirit Live at Zepp Tokyo 2010.12.12: Released: April 20, 2011	23	—
2012	Kazuyoshi Saito Live Tour 2011–2012 "45 Stones" at Nippon Budokan 2012.2.11: Released: June 27, 2012	7	—
2013	Kazuyoshi Saito 20th Anniversary Live 1993–2013 "20<21" ~Korekara mo Yorochikubi~ at Kobe World Kinen Hall 2013.8.25: Released: December 25, 2013	19	36
2014	Kazuyoshi Saito Live Tour 2013–2014 Saito & Kazuyoshi at Nippon Budokan 2014.2.16 (KAZUYOSHI SAITO LIVE TOUR 2013-2014 斉藤&和義 at NIPPON BUDOKAN 2014.2.16): Released: June 18, 2014	12	10
2015	Kazuyoshi Saito Tour 2014 "Rumble Horses" Live at Zepp Tokyo 2014.12.12: Released: March 18, 2015	23	21
2016	Kazuyoshi Saito Live Tour 2015–2016 "To the End of the Wind" Live at Nippon Budokan 2016.5.22: Released: September 21, 2016	6	9
2017	Kazuyoshi Saito Hikigatari Tour 2017 "Singing in the Rain" Live at Nakano Sunplaza 2017.06.21: Released: October 25, 2017	7	19
2018	Kazuyoshi Saito Live Tour 2018 Toys Blood Music Live at Yamanashi Collany Bunka Hall 2018.06.02: Released: November 28, 2018	10	17
2019	Kazuyoshi Saito 25th Anniversary Live 1993–2018 25＜26 ~Korekara mo Yorochiku Bīchiku~ Live at Nippon Budokan 2018.09.07: Released: March 20, 2019	13	15
2019	Kazuyoshi Saito Hikigatari Tour 2019 "Time in the Garage" Live at Nakano Sun Plaza 2019.06.13: Released: November 20, 2019	9	13
2021	Kazuyoshi Saito Live Tour 2020 "202020" Maboroshi no Setlist de 2-kakan Kaisai! ~Banjikyūsu mo Kishikaisei~ Live at Nakano Sunplaza Hall 2021.4.28: Released: October 27, 2021	7	20
2022	Kazuyoshi Saito Live Tour 2021 "202020 & 55 Stones" Live at Tokyo International Forum 2021.10.31: Released: October 5, 2022	6	12
2023	Kazuyoshi Saito Hikigatari Tour "Juuni Gatsu~2022" Live at Nippon Budokan 2022.12.21: Released: August 30, 2023	8	16
2023	Kazuyoshi Saito Live Tour 2023 Pineapple Express ~Ashita Daisuki na Rock 'n Roll Band ga Kono Machi ni Yattekuru nda~: Released: December 20, 2023	—	—
2024	Kazuyoshi Saito 30th Anniversary Live 1993–2023 30<31 ~Korekara mo Yorochiku Beam~ Live at Tokyo International Forum 2023.09.22: Released: March 27, 2024	8	—
2025	Kazuyoshi Saito Live Tour 2024 "Seishun 58 Kippu" ~Trio de Pon~ Live at Zepp Haneda 2024.11.09: Released: March 26, 2025	14	—
"—" denotes a recording released before the creation of the chart, or that did not chart.
