= Dareka ga =

Single by Puffy AmiYumi
- Released: July 29, 2009
- Genre: Rock
- Label: Ki/oon Records

Puffy AmiYumi singles chronology
"Hiyori Hime" (2009)	"Dareka ga" (2009)	"R.G.W." (2010)

Music video
- "Darekaga" on YouTube

"Dareka ga" (誰かが; "Someone") is the 28th single by Japanese pop duo Puffy AmiYumi, released on July 29, 2009. "Dareka ga" was used as the official theme song for the sixth Naruto movie, Inheritors of the Will of Fire.

A limited edition of the single was released along with the regular edition. The limited edition features an extra DVD with exclusive footage of the movie including the trailer.

== Track listing ==
=== CD single ===
1. Dareka ga
2. Wedding Bell [80kidz remix]

== Chart performance ==
The single peaked at number 30 on the singles chart and stayed on the chart for 4 weeks.

Chart (2009)	Peak position
Japan (Oricon)	30
