= Yoshiharu Abe =

- Born: 30 July 1966 (age 59); Yamagata
- Occupation(s): Artist and producer

Yoshiharu Abe (阿部 義晴, Abe Yoshiharu; born 30 July 1966 in Yamagata) is a Japanese popular music artist and producer. His 1992 single "+ OR -" hit the Billboard charts in Japan at number 5 in October 1992. After Unicorn dissolved in 1994, he started his solo career.

== Discography ==
=== Singles ===
- "+ OR -" (12 September 1992)
- "Yokubo" (21 May 1994)
- "Boku no Yukue" (2 November 1994)
- "Suima" (21 June 1995)
- "Gemusetto" (22 November 1995)

=== Albums ===
- A (2 November 1994)
- Wildfire (13 December 1995)
