= Ai no Shirushi =

1998 song by Puffy AmiYumi

"Ai no shirushi"

Single by Puffy AmiYumi

from the album Jet-CD
- Released: 1998
- Genre: J-pop
- Songwriter: Masamune Kusano

Puffy AmiYumi singles chronology
"Mother/Nehorina hahorina" (1997)	"Ai no shirushi" (1998)	"Tararan/Puffy no tourmen" (1998)

Music video
- "Sign of Love (Ai No Shirushi)" on YouTube

"Ai no Shirushi" (愛のしるし; Sign of Love) is the sixth single released by Japanese pop duo Puffy AmiYumi. It was released on March 14, 1998. This song was written and composed by Masamune Kusano of band Spitz. Some of this song was played in the film Waterboys. Puffy AmiYumi also sang the Chinese version on its album, The Very Best of Puffy/AmiYumi Jet Fever. Captain Funk also did a remix of it on its album An Illustrated History. There was also a special version of the song sung for the Drummania video game. "Ai no Shirushi" was also featured on the live action film Love Com. A portion of the song was also featured in "The Phantom of Rock" of Hi Hi Puffy AmiYumi and the song was also featured in the end credits in the Japanese version of the Disney and Pixar's 2026 animated film Hoppers.

In 2016, the song was also used in a commercial for "Nodogoshi Nama" (のどごし<生>) by Kirin Beer, featuring the duo Puffy AmiYumi.

Critic Nancy Seki pointed out that part of the intro to "Seibu Summer Market" TV commercial by Seibu Department Store, which aired in 1998, the same year the song was released, interpolated the song.

== Track listing ==
1. Ai no Shirushi (愛のしるし; Sign of Love)
2. Ai no Shirushi (inst. (愛のしるし)
3. Sign Of Love (Captain Funk's Puffy De Samba Remix)
4. Ai no Shirushi (Chinese version)
