= Nice (Puffy AmiYumi album) =

Nice.

Studio album by PUFFY
- Released: January 22, 2003 (JA); August 12, 2003 (US); August 19, 2003 (CA)
- Recorded: The Steakhouse Studio, Cello Studio, Sony Music Studios, Tokyo; Sunset Sound, Sub Jersey Studios, Vibratorium, Mansfield Lodge, Andy's house, John's house
- Genres: Pop, rock, ska
- Length: 48:35 (US); 51:08 (Japan)
- Label: Epic/Sony; ESCL-2357; Bar None; BRN-CD-142
- Producer: Andy Sturmer

PUFFY chronology
The Hit Parade (2002)	Nice. (2003)	59 (2004)

Japanese cover
- Japanese Epic/Sony Cover (2003)

Professional ratings
Review scores
Source	Rating
Allmusic	4.5/5 stars

Nice (stylised as Nice.) is an album by Japanese pop group PUFFY, released in 2003 it is their third North American album. The US release featured a few track changes: "Atarashii hibi" and "Tomodachi" were replaced with "Urei", "Teen Titans Theme" and "Planet Tokyo", an English song with the melody of "Akai buranko". The album peaked at No. 20 on the Japanese Albums Chart.

The introductory carrier melody of "K2G(Kimi Ni Go!)" was derived from the introductory interlude of the song "How Was It for You?" by James, from this English Postpunk/Britpop band's third album, Gold Mother (1990).

The cover art for the American version of the album is a homage to John Lennon and Yoko Ono's "bed-in" peace protests held in 1969. The songs Planet Tokyo and K2G (Kimi Ni Go!) are featured in the Hi Hi Puffy AmiYumi World Tour Game and Teen Titans.

== Track listing ==
Japanese edition

1. "Akai buranko" – 3:46
2. "Tokyo Nights" – 3:49
3. "Angel of Love" – 3:11
4. "Sayonara" – 3:18
5. "Invisible Tomorrow" – 3:54
6. "Thank You" – 3:52
7. "Long Beach Nightmare" – 3:14
8. "Your Love Is a Drug" – 3:32
9. "K2G (Kimi Ni Go!)" – 4:34
10. "Shiawase" – 4:21
11. "Atarashii hibi" – 3:32
12. "Tomodachi" – 10:05

US edition

1. "Planet Tokyo" (Sung in English) (Sturmer) – 3:49
2. "Tokyo Nights" (Pierre Taki, Sturmer, John Fields) – 3:53
3. "Angel of Love" (Suzuki Shoko, Sturmer) – 3:12
4. "Sayonara" (YO-KING, Sturmer) – 3:16
5. "Invisible Tomorrow" (Puffy AmiYumi, Sturmer) – 3:54
6. "Thank You" (Yumi, Sturmer) – 3:55
7. "Long Beach Nightmare" (Ami, Sturmer) – 3:15
8. "Your Love Is a Drug" (Sung in English) (Sturmer) – 3:33
9. "K2G (Kimi Ni Go!)" (Puffy AmiYumi, Sturmer) – 4:37
10. "Shiawase (Happiness)" (Okuda Tamio) – 4:20
11. "Worry (憂, Urei)" (Puffy AmiYumi, Sturmer) – 3:54
12. "Teen Titans Theme" (Sturmer) – 3:08
13. "Red Swing" (Puffy AmiYumi, Sturmer) – 3:51

== Personnel ==
Puffy AmiYumi

- Ami Onuki - vocals, harmony
- Yumi Yoshimura - vocals, harmony

Additional personnel

- Andy Sturmer - drums, guitar, drum programming, ARP synthesizer, Moog synthesizer, guitars, pipe organ, mellotron, percussion, vibraphone, keyboards, trumpet, marimba, bass, Prophet synthesizer, Fender Rhodes, vocal kazoo, claps, piano, acoustic guitar, ARP string ensemble, harmony, Vox Continental organ, BVO
- John Fields - guitars, bass, piano, vocoder, Hammond organ B3, Roland Space Echo, chamberlin, Farfisa organ, strange echoes,
- Wookie Von Crozier - crazy drum fill
- Chris James - drums, Wurlitzer, synthesized blips and bleeps, toy piano, chamberlain
- Printz Board - flugelhorn
- Bleu - 12 string guitar
- Dean Parks - banjo, acoustic guitar
- Elizabeth Lea - trombone
- The Horndogs - horns
- James Childs - guitars
- Phillip Broussard, Jr. - harmonies and chorus
- Toishi Toshikazu - harmonies and chorus

== Production ==
- Producer: Andy Sturmer
- Instrument recording: John Fields
- Vocal recording: Thom Russo, John Fields
- Mixing: Thom Russo, John Fields
- Mastering: Kotetsu Tohru
- Mastering assistants: Phillip Broussard, Jr., Ohno, Shiota Osamu, Hatagoshi Hideyasu
- Musical instruments technician: Oba Toshimasa
- A&R: June Shinozaki
- Interpreter: Takamizawa Mai
- Art direction: Central 67
- Design: Central 67
- Photography: Uchida Shoji
- Hair and make-up: Shuma Tesuro
- Styling: Miyajima Takahiro
