= Jet CD =

Jet-CD

Studio album by PUFFY
- Released: March 31, 1998
- Recorded: 1996–1998
- Genres: Pop, rock
- Length: 51:06
- Label: Epic/Sony; ESCB-1871
- Producer: Tamio Okuda

PUFFY chronology
| SoloSolo (1997) | Jet-CD (1998) | Fever Fever (1999) |

Singles from Jet-CD
- 1. "That's the Way It Is" Released: October 7, 1996; 2. "Wild Girls on Circuit" Released: March 12, 1997; 3. "Nagisa Beach Fever" Released: April 4, 1997; 4. "Sign of Love" Released: March 14, 1998

Professional ratings
Review scores
| Source | Rating |
|---|---|
| Allmusic | 4.5/5 stars |

Jet CD is the second studio album by Japanese pop rock duo Puffy, released on March 31, 1998, through Epic/Sony Records. It features five hit singles that they released between 1996 and 1997, including three of which topped the Japanese Oricon charts.

== Release ==
Jet debuted at the number-two on the Oricon Weekly Albums Charts (defeated by Globe's third album Love Again), and climbed the summit in following week. The album remained there for 16 weeks, becoming their only album to have sold more than 1 million copies. In March 1999, the album won the 13th Gold Disc Awards by the Recording Industry Association of Japan, the prizes conferred on the music recordings which gained outstanding commercial success.

In Japan, the album was simultaneously released on MD (entitled Jet-MD). In some Asian territories, it was also released on audio cassette under the alternative title Jet-Cassette.

The third single, "Circuit no Musume" (サーキットの娘, also known by its alternative title "Wild Girls on Circuit"), was released on March 12, 1997. The single was charted as a #1 hit. Its cover design, when put alongside the right side of the cover from the single "Nagisa ni Matsuwaru Et Cetera", create a single picture together.

The fourth single, "Nagisa ni Matsuwaru Et Cetera", was released on April 4, 1997. In the first episode of the Japanese drama "Love Generation", Matsu Takako and Kimura Takuya sing karaoke to this song while doing the punching moves from the music video. The song is also notable for having the alternative title of '"Electric Beach Fever"' in Puffy's 2002 U.S. release An Illustrated History (but is not a direct translation of the original Japanese title). Lining up the single's cover with the single cover from Circuit no musume also results in one big picture.

== Reception ==
The Japanese edition of Rolling Stone ranked Jet-CD as number 76 on their list of "100 Greatest Japanese Rock Albums".

== Track listing ==
| No. | Title | Writer(s) | Length |
|---|---|---|---|
| 1. | "Jet Police (ジェット警察, Jet Keisatsu)" | Tamio Okuda | 3:45 |
| 2. | "That's the Way It Is (これが私の生きる道, Kore ga Watashi no Ikirumichi)" | Okuda | 3:23 |
| 3. | "Cake Is Love" | Yōsui Inoue | 5:10 |
| 4. | "Sign of Love (愛のしるし, Ai no Shirushi)" | Masamune Kusano | 2:48 |
| 5. | "Spring Morning (春の朝, Haru no Asa)" | Kaori Okui | 4:20 |
| 6. | "Lemon Kid (レモンキッド)" | Lyrics: Ami Onuki / Music: Okuda | 4:05 |
| 7. | "Little Beauty (小美人, Shoubijin)" | Lyrics: Okuda / Music: Dr. StrangeLove | 5:48 |
| 8. | "Curiously (ネホリーナハホリーナ, Nehori-na Hahori-na)" | Tortoise Matsumoto | 4:26 |
| 9. | "Philosophy (哲学, Tetsugaku)" | Lyrics: Yumi Yoshimura / Music: Okuda | 1:45 |
| 10. | "De Rio" | Lyrics: Katsumasa Motoya, Masato Inami / Music: Katsumasa Motoya, Harutoshi Inagaki, Masato Inami | 4:38 |
| 11. | "Wild Girls on Circuit (サーキットの娘, Sakitto no Musume)" | Okuda | 3:18 |
| 12. | "Electric Beach Fever (渚にまつわるエトセトラ, Nagisa ni Matsuwaru Et Cetera)" | Lyrics: Inoue / Music: Okuda | 4:00 |
| 13. | "Mother" | Okuda | 3:46 |

== Chart positions ==
| Year | Chart | Position | Sales |
|---|---|---|---|
| 1998 | Japanese Oricon Weekly Albums Chart (Top 100) | 1 | 1,223,000+ |

== Certification ==
| Region | Provider | Certification (sales thresholds) |
|---|---|---|
| Japan | RIAJ | Million |

== Accolades ==
=== Awards ===
| Year | Title | Award(s) |
|---|---|---|
| 1998 | Japan Gold Disc Award | Pop Albums of the Year - for Jet CD by Puffy |
