= Spike (Puffy AmiYumi album) =

2000 album by Puffy AmiYumi

Studio album by Puffy
- Released: October 12, 2000 (JA); May 1, 2001 (US); June 5, 2001 (CA)
- Genre: Pop, rock
- Length: 48:04 (JA); 57:18 (US)
- Label: Epic ESCB 2174; Sony Music International; 810186
- Producer: Takashi Furuta; Tamio Okuda Sparks Go Go; Andy Sturmer

Puffy chronology
Fever*Fever (1999)	Spike (2000)	The Hit Parade (2002)

Professional ratings
Review scores
Source	Rating
AllMusic	4/5 stars
Entertainment Weekly	B
LA Weekly	(favorable)

Spike is a studio album by Puffy released in 2001, and is their first North American album.

== Track listing ==
=== US edition ===
1. "No. 5" (Boogie Woogie No. 5) (Tamio Okuda)
2. "Violet" (Puffy AmiYumi, Sturmer)
3. "Shut Your Mouth, Honey" (Puffy AmiYumi, Atsuya Tachibana, and Shinichi Yakuma)
4. "Cosmic Wonder" (Okuda)
5. "Destruction Pancake" (Onuki)
6. "Su-I-Su-I" (Okuda and Puffy AmiYumi)
7. "Sui Sui" (Okuda and Puffy AmiYumi)
8. "Swimming Pool" (Okuda)
9. "Green Apple" (Puffy AmiYumi, Shinichi Yakuma)
10. "This Is the Song of Sweet Sweet Season When Cherry Garcia Blossoms Bloom" (Yumi Yoshimura and Sturmer)
11. "Into the Beach" (Okuda)
12. "Puffy's Rule" (Okuda, Furata)
13. "December" (Puffy AmiYumi & Andy Sturmer)
14. "Love So Pure" (bonus track) (Sturmer)
15. "Wild Girls on Circuit" [The Ready Made JBL Mix '99] (bonus track) (Okuda)

=== Japanese edition ===
1. "Boogie Woogie No.5"
2. "Sumire"
3. "Mondo Muyo"
4. "Cosmic Nagaretabi"
5. "Destruction Pancake"
6. "Su-i Su-i"
7. "Sui Sui"
8. "Pool Nite"
9. "Aoi Ringo"
10. "Sakura no Hana ga Saku Amai Amai Kisetsu no Uta"
11. "Umi Eto"
12. "Puffy no Rule"
13. "Junigatsu"
