= Boogie Woogie No. 5 =

2000 single by Puffy AmiYumi

Single by Puffy AmiYumi
- Released: 2000
- Recorded: 2000
- Genre: J-pop, Swing revival
- Songwriter(s): Tamio Okuda

Puffy AmiYumi singles chronology
"Umi e to" (2000)	"Boogie Woogie No. 5" (2000)	"Atarashii hibi" (2001)

Music video
- "Boogie Woogie No. 5" on YouTube

"Boogie Woogie No.5" is the 12th single released by Japanese pop duo Puffy AmiYumi with the Tokyo Ska Paradise Orchestra on September 27, 2000.

The remix is featured in the 2003 remix album PRMX Turbo.

== Music video ==
The music video is remade as a bonus video for An Illustrated History.

== Track listing ==
1. "Boogie Woogie No. 5" (words and music: Tamio Okuda) Stereophonic
2. "Lucy wa Moon Face" (words and music: Shinichi Yakuma)
3. "Boogie Woogie No. 5" [Original Karaoke]
4. "Lucy wa Moon Face" [Original Karaoke]

== Chart performance ==
The single peaked at number 22 on the singles chart, selling 20,310 copies that week, and stayed on the chart for 3 weeks.

Chart (2000)	Peak position
Japan (Oricon)	22

== Success to the cartoon series ==
Sam Register, creator of the Hi Hi Puffy AmiYumi cartoon show on Cartoon Network, watched the video in a channel in New York but was unable to find out the band's name since the credits were in Japanese. He later heard it again on radio and found out the band's name. After that he contacted Sony Japan to get the band to record the theme song of Teen Titans and as PUFFY started to grow on Cartoon Network, Register was influenced to create a cartoon series starring the duo in animated adventures. The real band would only appear in live-action skits (filmed in Japan) while the animated versions were voiced by veteran voiceover actors Janice Kawaye and Grey DeLisle (both who speak the language fluently; DeLisle learned the language from her time in the show). This was added to Collect All 5.
