= Honeycreeper (album) =

honeycreeper

Studio album by PUFFY
- Released: September 26, 2007
- Genre: Pop rock
- Language: Japanese and English
- Label: Ki/oon Records; KSCL-1174

PUFFY chronology
Splurge (2006)	honeycreeper (2007)	Bring It! (2009)

Singles from Honeycreeper
- 1. "Boom Boom Beat/Oh Edo NagareboshiIV" Released: July 18, 2007; 2. "Oriental Diamond/Kuchibiru Motion" Released: September 5, 2007

Honeycreeper is an album by Japanese pop band PUFFY that was released on September 26, 2007 in Japan. The album is notable for being the first Puffy album where "band Godfather", Andy Sturmer, is not credited for writing any of the songs.

"Hasan Jauze" is a cover of a song by The Cro-Magnons, which was released within two weeks' time of the original.

== Production and legacy ==
Puffy have said in an interview that inspiration for the album's title name, 'Honeycreeper', came from a leaflet they had come across while on a vacation in Hawaii, and that it was the name for a type of bird, similar to the ones seen on the album's cover.

Kazuya Yoshii, the writer of "Kuchibiru Motion", recorded a cover of "Oriental Diamond" for his 2009 single "Biru Mania".

== Track listing ==
1. "オリエンタル・ダイヤモンド" (Oriental Diamond) (Yosui Inoue/Tamio Okuda) - 4:04
2. "Ain't Gonna Cut It" (Butch Walker & Robert Schwartzman) - 2:51
3. "君とオートバイ" (Kimi to Otobai/You and the Motorbike) (Yusuke Chiba) - 4:14
4. "くちびるモーション" (Kuchibiru Motion/Lip Motion) (Yoshii Kazuya) - 4:02
5. "はやいクルマ" (Hayai Kuruma/Fast Car) (Masatoshi Mashima) - 3:43
6. "サヨナラサマー" (Sayonara Samaa/So Long, Summer) (Sawao Yamanaka) - 4:16
7. "Boom Boom Beat" (Anders Hellgren & David Myhr) - 3:19
8. "妖怪PUFFY" (Youkai PUFFY/Ghost PUFFY) (Kankurou Kudou/Taku Tomizawa) - 7:06
9. "Closet Full Of Love" (Butch Walker & Kara DioGuardi) - 2:58
10. "はさんじゃうぜ" (Hasan Jauze) (Masatoshi Mashima) - 2:48
11. "Complaint" (Sawao Yamanaka) - 2:58
12. "お江戸流れ星IV" (O Edo Nagareboshi IV/Oh Edo Shooting Star IV) (Pierre Taki/Anders Hellgren & David Myhr) - 3:48
13. "アイランド" (Airando/Island) (Yusuke Chiba) - 4:48

== Scrapped Tracks ==
- "Clearance" (Leaked on the Internet two weeks before "Honeycreeper" official release) - 4:22
- "Nothing There" (Only an instrumental and a demo by another male singer) - 3:10
- "Moon/Sun" (Set to be released, cancelled) - 4:01
- "Forget How My Voice Sounds" (Instrumental version leaked, unknown real name, a fan name was given) - 4:57

== Charts ==
The single peaked at number 47 on the singles chart, selling 2.864 copies that week, and stayed on the chart for 4 weeks.

"Boom Boom Beat" (2007)	Peak position
Japan (Oricon)	47

The single peaked at number 55 on the singles chart and stayed on the chart for 2 weeks.

"Oriental Diamond" (2007)	Peak position
Japan (Oricon)	55
