= The Merrymakers =

Swedish musical group

The Merrymakers is a Swedish music duo composed of Anders Hellgren and David Myhr. Former members are Thomas Nyström, Kenneth Berg, Patrik Bergman and Peter Arffman. Hellgren and Myhr have been making music together since the 1990s. Their major releases include Andrew's Store, No Sleep 'Til Famous and Bubblegun. They have also written and produced songs for Puffy AmiYumi, Dorian Gray, Yuko Yamaguchi and Fujifabric.

In March 2008, Anders Hellgren announced that work had begun on a new Merrymakers album, although this project seemed to be shelved in favor of David Myhr's solo album, Soundshine, released in 2012.

Hellgren and Myhr also play in the ABBA tribute band Super Trouper.

== Influences ==
They have cited the Beatles, ABBA and Depeche Mode as some of their major musical influences.

== Discography ==
=== Original Swedish albums ===
- No Sleep 'Til Famous -- 9 October 1995, CNR Records
- Bubblegun -- 26 January 1998, Virgin Records

=== International album releases ===
- No Sleep 'Til Famous (Japan) 28 April 1997
- Bubblegun (Japan) 27 November 1997
- Andrew's Store - early singles compilation (Japan, Sweden) 26 September 1997
- Bubblegun (U.S.) 9 February 1999

=== Original Swedish singles ===
- "Andrew's Store" / "It's Alright" / "I Need Something" / "Making History" 1992
- "Nobody There" / "I Won't Let You Down" 1993
- "Magic Circles" / "Here For You" 1993
- "Spinning My Mind Away" / "Love (You can make it alright)" 1995
- "Monument of Me" / "Still Someone to You" 1995
- "Aeroplane" / "Jetlag" / "Parachute" 1996
- "Monkey in the Middle" / "Coming Home" / "Superstern" / "The Prettiest Star" 26 Nov. 1997
- "Saltwater Drinks" / "Sad" / "Saltwater Drinks" (Remix) 12 Jan 1998
- "April's Fool" / (Hit Vision's radio edit) / (Hit Vision's dance mix) / (Instrumental fool) 1 April 1998

=== International singles ===
- "Monument of Me" / "Parachute" / "Love (You can make it alright)" / "Monument of Me" (Karaoke version) 28 April 1997
- "Smiling in the Sky" 1997 [Japanese promotional single]
- "Superstar" / "Superstern" / "Superstar" (karaoke) 1997
- "Troubled Times" (American promotion single) 1998
- "No More Lonely Nights" (digital single) 18 June 2022 [re-release of 2001 Paul McCartney tribute album track, originally released in U.S. & Japan]

=== Compilation appearances ===
- NOW That's What I Call Music! 6 (Japan) 11 June 1997 -- "Monument of Me"
- NOW That's What I Call Music! 8 (Japan) 24 June 1998 -- "Superstar"
- Full Circle: A Tribute to Gene Clark (U.S., Spain) April 2000 -- "I'll Feel a Whole Lot Better"
- The New Sell Out (Tribute to The Who) (U.S.). 28 May 2012 -- "Commercial Break - Radio London" (power pop compilation assembled in 2000 and originally unreleased)
