= Fever Fever (album) =

1999 album by Puffy AmiYumi

Studio album by Puffy AmiYumi
- Released: June 23, 1999
- Length: 51:09
- Labels: Epic/Sony; ESCB-1995
- Producer: Masanori Sasaji

Puffy AmiYumi chronology
| Jet-CD (1998) | Fever Fever (1999) | Spike (2000) |

Fever Fever (stylized as Fever*Fever) is the third studio album by Japanese pop rock duo Puffy AmiYumi.

== Overview ==
"Puffy de Rumba" was released as a single on December 12, 1998. In the music video, Ōnuki and Yoshimura sing and dance in a magical garden with Jimi Hendrix.

"Tararan"/"Puffy no Tourmen" was released as a single on August 29, 1998. The music video has Ōnuki and Yoshimura singing, interspersed with scenes of a traveling polar bear.

"Yume no tame ni" was released as a single on June 9, 1999.

== Track listing ==
| No. | Title | Writer(s) | Length |
|---|---|---|---|
| 1. | "Stray Cats Fever" | Masato Inami, Katsumasa Mototani, and Puffy AmiYumi | 5:07 |
| 2. | "Yume no Tame ni (夢のために; For Our Dreams)" | Tamio Okuda | 3:09 |
| 3. | "Nichiyōbi no Musume (日曜日の娘; Sunday Girls)" | Tamio Okuda | 3:55 |
| 4. | "Nannari to narudeshō (なんなりとなるでしょう; Anything Can Become a Habit)" | Masato Inami and Yumi Yoshimura | 5:46 |
| 5. | "Kireina Namida ga Tarinai yo" (きれいな涙が足りないよ; Pure Tears Are Not Enough)" | Shōko Suzuki | 2:49 |
| 6. | "Taiyō (太陽, Sun)" | Shinjirō Inoue and Shōko Suzuki | 3:59 |
| 7. | "Robot Prototype Version 0.2 (ロボット プロトタイプヴァージョン0.2, Robotto Purototaipu Vājon 0.2)" | Puffy AmiYumi | 0:48 |
| 8. | "Puffy de Rumba (パフィーdeルンバ, Pafī de Runba)" | Puffy AmiYumi and Yoriko Tamura | 3:33 |
| 9. | "Koi no Line, Ai no Shape (恋のライン愛のシェイプ, Koi no Rain, Ai no Sheipu; Line of Love, Shape of Love)" | Shōko Suzuki | 4:15 |
| 10. | "Always Dreamin' About You" | Linda Herrick, Ami Onuki, and Okuda | 3:02 |
| 11. | "Natsuyasumi Prototype (夏休みプロトタイプ, Natsuyasumi Purototaipu; Summer Vacation Prototype)" | Puffy AmiYumi | 0:44 |
| 12. | "It Works (はたらくよ, Hataraku yo)" | Nario Sakai | 4:28 |
| 13. | "Puffy de Bossa (パフィーdeボッサ, Pafī de Bossa)" | Puffy AmiYumi | 0:33 |
| 14. | "Tararan (たららん)" | Puffy AmiYumi, Tamio Okuda, and Andy Sturmer | 4:16 |
| 15. | "Dare ga Sore o (誰がそれを, Who Does It?)" | Tamio Okuda | 4:45 |

== Charts ==
Chart performance for Fever Fever
| Album (1999) | Peak position |
|---|---|
| Japanese Albums Chart | 3 |

The single ranked #12 and stayed on the chart for four weeks.

| "Yume no tame ni" (1999) | Peak position |
|---|---|
| Japan (Oricon) | 12 |

== Personnel ==
- Sumiharu Arima – French horn
- Tomoyuki Asakawa – harp
- Jake H. Concepcion – sax (tenor)
- Otsuhiko Fujita – French horn
- Takashi Furuta – drums
- Takayuki Hijikata – guitar, electric guitar, handclapping
- Makoto Hirahara – sax (alto)
- Masato Inami – chorus
- Megumi Ishibachi – French horn
- Shin Kazuhara – trumpet
- Taro Kiyooka – trombone
- Chiharu Mikuzuki – bass
- Akira Okazawa – bass
- Tamio Okuda – chorus
- Seigen Ono – engineer, mastering, mixing
- Ami Onuki – vocals
- Puffy AmiYumi – vocals, chorus, handclapping
- Masanori Sasaji – keyboards
- Masatsugu Shinozaki – strings
- Andy Sturmer – producer, engineer, mixing
- Shoko Suzuki – drums, chorus
- Hideyo Takakuwa – flute
- Yuichi Togashiki – drums
- Minoru Uesato – sax (baritone)
- Hiroshi Yaginuma – sax (tenor)
- Tsuyoshi Yokoyama – programming
- Yumi Yoshimura – vocals
- Bob Zung – sax (tenor)
