= The Hit Parade (Puffy AmiYumi album) =

Studio album by Puffy AmiYumi
- Released: February 20, 2002
- Recorded: 2001
- Genre: J-pop; pop rock
- Length: 34:48
- Language: Japanese
- Label: Epic/Sony; ESCL-2288

Puffy AmiYumi chronology
Spike (2000)	The Hit Parade (2002)	Nice. (2003)

Singles from The Hit Parade
- 1. "Aoi Namida" Released: December 5, 2001; 2. "Hurricane" Released: February 6, 2002

Professional ratings
Review scores
Source	Rating
Allmusic	4/5 stars

The Hit Parade (ザ・ヒット・パレード, Za Hitto Parēdo) is a cover album by Puffy AmiYumi (stylized as PUFFY). Released by Epic Records on February 20, 2002, the album features covers of hits from the 1970s and 1980s. The album peaked at No. 10 on Oricon's weekly albums chart.

== Track listing ==
No.	Title	Lyrics	Music	Original artist	Length
1.	"Image Down"	Kyosuke Himuro	Tomoyasu Hotei	Boøwy	3:08
2.	"Hurricane" (Harikēn (ハリケーン))	Reiko Yukawa	Daisuke Inoue	Chanels	2:53
3.	"Ai ga Tomaranai (Turn It into Love)" ((愛が止まらない 〜Turn it into love〜; "Love Doesn't Stop (Turn It into Love)"))	Neko Oikawa	Mike Stock; Matt Aitken; Pete Waterman	Wink	5:00
4.	"Cherry" (Cherī (チェリー))	Masamune Kusano	Kusano	Spitz	4:40
5.	"High-Teen Boogie" (Haitīn Bugi (ハイティーン・ブギ))	Takashi Matsumoto	Tatsuro Yamashita	Masahiko Kondō	2:59
6.	"Aishū Date (New York City Nights)" ((哀愁でいと (NEW YORK CITY NIGHTS); "Sorrowful Date (New York City Nights)"))	Kazuko Kobayashi	Andrew Joseph DiTaranto; Guy Hemric	Toshihiko Tahara	3:28
7.	"Aoi Namida" ((青い涙; "Blue Tears"))	Jirō Mita	Mita	Jirō Mita	2:39
8.	"Hito ni Yasashiku" ((人にやさしく; "Friendly to People"))	Hiroto Kōmoto	Kōmoto	The Blue Hearts	4:00
9.	"Chōshō" ((嘲笑; "Mockery"))	Beat Takeshi	Kōji Tamaki	Beat Takeshi	3:22
10.	"Kakkoman Boogie" (Kakkoman Bugi (カッコマン・ブギ))	Kōshin Okuyama	Ryudo Uzaki	Downtown Boogie Woogie Band	2:39
Total length:					34:48

== Charts ==
Chart (2002)	Peak position
Japanese Albums (Oricon)	10
