= Unicorn (Japanese band) =

Japanese rock band, formed in 1986

- Origin: Hiroshima, Japan
- Genres: Alternative rock, post-punk, new wave
- Years active: 1986–1993; 2009–present
- Labels: CBS/SONY RECORDS (1987–1991); Sony Records (1991–1993); Ki/oon Records (2009–2012); Ki/oon Music (2012–present)
- Members: Okuda Tamio (vocals & guitar); Teshima Isamu (guitar, vocals); EBI (bass, vocals); ABEDON (keyboard, vocals); Kawanishi Koichi (drums, vocals)
- Past members: Mukai Midori (keyboard)
- Website: unicorn.jp

Unicorn (ユニコーン, Yunikōn) is a Japanese rock band, formed in 1986, consisting of Koichi Kawanishi (drums, vocals), Tamio Okuda (vocals, rhythm guitar), Isamu Teshima (lead guitar, vocals), Kazushi Horiuchi (bass guitar, vocals), and Yoshiharu Abe (keyboard, vocals). They reunited in 2009.

Unicorn recorded the theme song for the Space Brothers anime for episodes 01-13, titled "Feel So Moon".

== Members ==
Current line-up

- Tamio Okuda – lead and backing vocals, rhythm guitar, occasional lead guitar and percussion (1986–September 1993, 2009–present)
- Isamu Teshima – lead guitar, backing and lead vocals (1986–September 1993, 2009–present)
- Kazushi "EBI" Horiuchi – bass, backing and lead vocals (1986–September 1993, 2009–present)
- Yoshiharu "ABEDON" Abe – keyboard, lead and backing vocals, occasional rhythm guitar (1988–September 1993, 2009–present)
- Koichi Kawanishi – drums, percussion, backing and lead vocals (1986–February 1993, 2009–present)

Former member

- Midori Mukai – keyboard, backing vocals (1986–1988)

== Discography ==
=== Singles ===
| # | Release date | Title | Peak position | Additional Notes |
|---|---|---|---|---|
| 1 | April 29, 1989 | Big Confusion (大迷惑) | 12 | - |
| 2 | September 1, 1989 | Day Game (デーゲーム) | 11 | Released by the name of "Jirō Sakagami and Unicorn" |
| 3 | July 21, 1990 | Working Man (働く男) | 3 | Theme song for the TV show, A Sweet Nightmare |
| 4 | October 21, 1990 | Cash In (命果てるまで) | 10 | - |
| 5 | January 21, 1991 | Male Star (スターな男) | 6 | Theme song for the TV show, A Sweet Nightmare |
| 6 | June 21, 1991 | Blues (ブルース) | 4 | - |
| 7 | October 25, 1991 | Two Peas in a Pod (ヒゲとボイン) | 23 | - |
| 8 | December 2, 1992 | Snowy Town (雪が降る町) | 4 | - |
| 9 | April 21, 1993; March 24, 2006 (Re-release) | Wonderful Days (すばらしい日々) | 6; 181 (Re-release) | Theme song for the movie Hinagon (2005); Used in the commercial for the Sony HD Handycam HC3 (2006) |
| Project | November 1, 1996 | Snowy Town "more bell mix" (雪が降る町 "more bell mix") | 38 | - |
| 10 | February 4, 2009 | WAO! | 3 | Used in the commercial for Aquarius |
| 11 | October 7, 2009 | Half Century Boy (半世紀少年) | 3 | Ending theme for the variety show SUKKIRI!! |
| 12 | June 9, 2010 | Naked Sun (裸の太陽) | 7 | Used in the commercial for Aquarius |
| 13 | April 27, 2011 | Digital Soup/Buta Buta (デジタルスープ/ぶたぶた) | 7 | Digital Soup: Used in a commercial for Mitsui Fudoson Realty; Buta Buta: Theme song for the movie "That's The Way!!" |
| 14 | June 22, 2012 | Feel So Moon | 5 | Opening theme for the anime Space Brothers |
| 15 | August 12, 2012 | Goju Kara Otoko | - | Digital download |
| 16 | June 8, 2016 | Echo (エコー) | 20 | Ending theme for the drama Jūhan Shuttai |

=== Studio albums ===
| # | Release date | Title | Peak position |
|---|---|---|---|
| 1 | October 21, 1987 | BOOM | 77 |
| 2 | July 21, 1988 | PANIC ATTACK | 18 |
| 3 | June 1, 1989 | Hattori (服部) | 3 |
| 4 | October 1, 1990 | Storm of the Beast (ケダモノの嵐) | 1 |
| EP(5) | November 1, 1990 | Dancing Turtle Yapushi (おどる亀ヤプシ) | 2 |
| EP(6) | December 1, 1990 | Have a Nice Day (ハヴァナイスデー) | 2 |
| 7 | September 30, 1991 | Beard and Boobs (ヒゲとボイン) | 2 |
| 8 | May 21, 1993 | SPRINGMAN | 1 |
| 9 | February 18, 2009 | Chambre (シャンブル) | 1 |
| 10 | May 25, 2011 | Z | 2 |
| EP(11) | August 31, 2011 | Z II | 3 |
| 12 | March 26, 2014 | Igajyakejyoro (イーガジャケジョロ) | 3 |
| 13 | August 10, 2016 | yu 13-14 (ゅ 13-14) | 1 |
| 14 | March 8, 2017 | Half Century No. 5 (半世紀 No. 5) | 9 |
| 15 | March 27, 2019 | UC100V | 5 |
| 16 | October 2, 2019 | UC100W | 8 |
| 17 | August 18, 2021 | Twist Island & Shout Island (ツイス島&シャウ島) | |
| 18 | November 15, 2023 | Crossroad (クロスロード) | |
