= Asia no Junshin =

1998 song by Puffy AmiYumi

Single by Puffy AmiYumi

from the album AmiYumi
- Released: May 13, 1996
- Label: Epic Records Japan
- Songwriters: Tamio Okuda; Yōsui Inoue
- Producer: Tamio Okuda

Puffy AmiYumi singles chronology
"Asia no Junshin" (1996)	"Kore ga Watashi no Ikiru Michi" (1996)

Music video
- "Ajia no Junshin" on YouTube "True Asia (Asia No Junshin) (Ami Yumi Emi Version)" on YouTube

"Asia no Junshin" (アジアの純真, Ajia no Junshin; True Asia) is the debut single of Japanese pop rock duo Puffy released in May 1996. It was produced and composed by Tamio Okuda, with lyrics written by Yōsui Inoue.

== Track listing (3-inch CD single) ==
No.	Title	Writer(s)	Length
1.	"Asia no Junshin (アジアの純真, Ajia no Junshin)"	Tamio Okuda, Yōsui Inoue
2.	"Puffy na Ohirune (Puffyなお昼寝)"	Tamio Okuda, Takemi Shima
3.	"Asia no Junshin (アジアの純真, Ajia no Junshin)" (Karaoke)	Okuda

== Chart positions ==
Chart (1996)	Position	Sales
Japanese Oricon Weekly Singles Chart (top 100)	3	1,189,000+

== Certifications ==
Region	Provider	Certification (sales thresholds)
Japan	RIAJ	Million

== Awards ==
The 38th Japan Record Awards
Year	Category
1996	Best New Artist
