= Tamio Okuda =

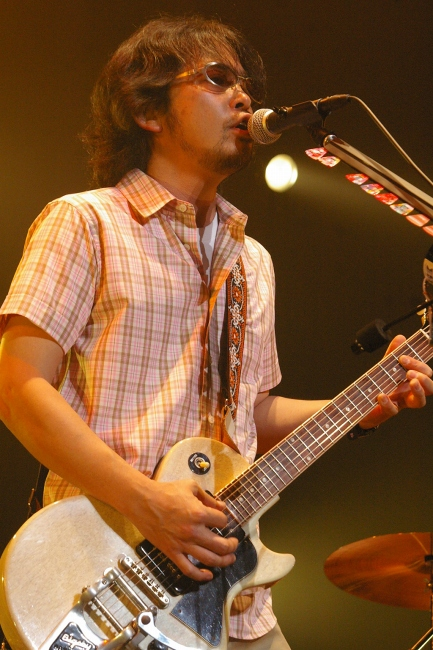
- Okuda in 2009

Background information
- Born: 12 May 1965 (age 61); Hiroshima, Japan
- Genres: Rock
- Occupations: Singer, songwriter, music producer, actor
- Instruments: Vocals, guitar
- Years active: 1987–present
- Labels: Ki/oon Records, Sony Music Entertainment
- Member of: Unicorn; Ooochie Koochie
- Website: Okuda Tamio Web Site, Unicorn

Tamio Okuda (奥田 民生, Okuda Tamio; born 12 May 1965) is a Japanese singer, songwriter, and producer. He started his career in 1986 as a member of the band Unicorn. After Unicorn broke up, Okuda moved on to a solo career in 1994 with the single "Ai no Tame ni". He has written and composed many songs for various artists, particularly Puffy. He is signed to Sony Music Japan.

He was ranked number 25 in a list of Japan's top 100 musicians, provided by HMV Japan in 2003. His band Unicorn was also ranked at number 61. Unicorn reunited in 2009.

He appeared in the 2011 Batsu game on Gaki no Tsukai. He performed his song "Ai no Tame ni" with alternate lyrics to recap all that went on in the New Years' special.

The Japanese dub of Cars 3 uses "Engine" as its ending theme.

On July 11, 2018, Okuda, Kazuyoshi Saito, Yohito Teraoka (Jun Sky Walkers), Takashi Hamazaki (Flying Kids), Yo-King (Magokoro Brothers) and Tortoise Matsumoto announced the formation of a supergroup called the Curling Sitones (カーリングシトーンズ, Kāringu Shitōnzu). Each member is a multi-instrumentalist with all of them at-least being able to provide vocals and guitar and, like the Traveling Wilburys, each uses a pseudonym featuring "Sitone". They formed for a concert on September 23, 2018 at Zepp Tokyo celebrating Teraoka's 25th anniversary as a musician.

In 2025, Okuda formed the unit Ooochie Koochie with Kōji Kikkawa.

== Discography ==
=== Singles ===
- 'Kyuujitsu' (29 August 1992) – Unicorn's solo project
- 'Ai no Tame ni' (21 October 1994)
- 'Musuko' (15 January 1995)
- 'Coffee' (21 May 1995)
- 'Nayande Manande' (1 October 1995)
- 'Iijyuu Rider' (21 June 1996)
- 'Arigato' (13 February 1997) with Yōsui Inoue
- 'Koi no Kakera' (1 November 1997)
- 'Sasurai' (5 February 1998)
- 'Tsuki wo Koero' (20 February 1999)
- 'Marshmallow' (19 January 2000)
- 'The Standard' (25 July 2001)
- 'Custom' (24 October 2001)
- 'Hana ni Naru' (20 March 2002)
- 'Hehehe' (4 September 2002)
- 'Man wo Jishite' (23 October 2002)
- 'Sound of Music' (28 April 2004)
- 'Skywalker' (30 June 2004)
- 'Nan to Iu' (25 August 2004)
- 'Tripper' (5 October 2005)
- 'Many' (19 July 2006)
- 'Parallel love' (20 December 2007) with Yōsui Inoue
- 'Mugen no Kaze' (21 November 2007)
- 'Utsukushiku moeru Mori' (2006) with Tokyo Ska Paradise Orchestra
- 'Sun no Son' (17 September 2008)
- 'Saikyou no Korekara' (8 September 2010)
- 'Kobushi wo ten ni tsukiagero' (11 January 2012)
- 'Engine' (12 July 2017) – Cars 3

=== Albums ===
- 29 (8 March 1995)
- 30 (1 October 1995)
- Shopping (19 March 1997) with Yōsui Inoue
- Fail Box (1 July 1997)
- Matatabi (18 March 1998)
- Gold Blend (23 March 2000)
- Car Songs of the Years (11 January 2001)
- E (19 September 2002)
- Okuda Tamio Live Songs of the Years (6 November 2003) live album
- Lion (6 October 2004)
- Comp (27 April 2005)
- Double Drive (21 February 2007) with Yōsui Inoue
- Fantastic OT9 (16 January 2008)
- Better Songs of the Years (29 October 2008)
- OTRL (4 August 2010)
- Grey Ray & The Chain Gang Tour (28 March 2012) live album
- OT Come Home (27 November 2013)
- Akicolle (11 May 2016) live album
- Tonari no Beethoven (23 August 2016) live album

=== DVD ===
- 'Tour 29/30'
- 'Tourdust 0–30'
- 'Tour 1997 Matatabi'
- 'Hitori Matatabi'
- 'Tour 2000 Goldblend'
- 'OT Clips of the years'
- 'Live songs of the years'
- 'OT Clips of the years Vol. 2'
- 'Hitori Matatabi Special at Hiroshima Municipal Stadium' (2004)
- 'Cheap trip 2006'
- 'Double Shopping Drive'
- 'Fantastic Tour 2008'
- 'Hitori Matatabi Special @ Itsukushima Jinja'
- 'Spice Boys at Nakano Sun Plaza'
- 'Hitori Matatabi Special @ Mazda Stadium'

== Filmography ==
- Custom Made 10.30 (2005)
