= Puffy AmiYumi =

Japanese pop rock duo

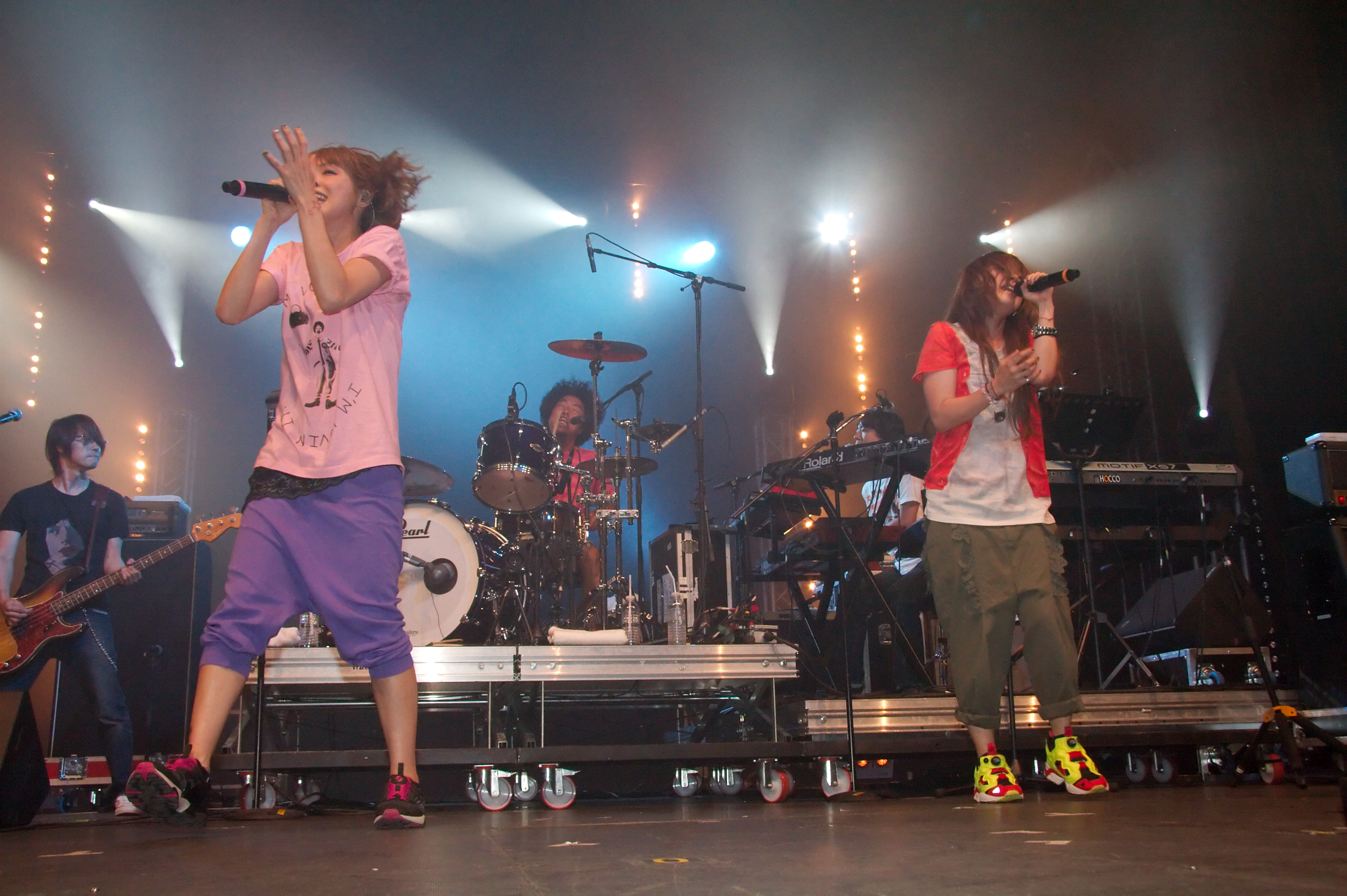
- Yoshimura (left) and Ōnuki (right) performing as PUFFY at the 2009 Japan Expo at the Paris-Nord Villepinte Exhibition Centre

Background information
- Also known as: Puffy
- Origin: Tokyo, Japan
- Genre: Pop rock
- Years active: 1995–present
- Labels: Epic; Ki/oon Music; Warner Music Japan; Bar/None; Tofu
- Members: Ami Ōnuki; Yumi Yoshimura
- Website: puffy.jp

Puffy AmiYumi, (Note: /ˈɑːmi ˈjuːmi/ AH-mee YOO-mee) or PUFFY, (Note: Japanese: パフィー) are a Japanese pop rock duo formed in Tokyo in 1995, consisting of singers Ami Ōnuki and Yumi Yoshimura. In the United States, they adopted the name Puffy AmiYumi to avoid legal naming conflicts with Sean Combs, who also performed under the name Puffy. The duo sings in Japanese, English, and Mandarin Chinese.

Ōnuki and Yoshimura were scouted by Sony-affiliated talent agencies and put together in the mid-1990s. Most of their work was produced or co-written by Okuda Tamio and Andy Sturmer, formerly of the bands Unicorn and Jellyfish, respectively.

The duo's first single, "Asia no Junshin" (1996), sold one million records. They gained mainstream success in Japan in 1998 following the release of their album Jet and continued with several more full-length releases (totaling 15 million sales in Japan).

In 2004, an animated series featuring fictionalized versions of themselves, Hi Hi Puffy AmiYumi, premiered on the US's Cartoon Network. While the singers portrayed themselves for short live-action segments taped in Japan, their characters were voiced by Janice Kawaye and Grey DeLisle respectively.

== History ==
=== 1990s: Pre-debut activities ===
When Ōnuki was in high school, she sang for a band called Hanoi Sex that participated in a Sony SD Audition and passed, becoming employees of Sony Music Entertainment. She later took vocal lessons and attended a professional school to learn how to become a better performer. The band eventually disbanded, leaving only her under Sony's employment. Ōnuki was encouraged to stay despite lacking a band and a clear musical direction.

Yoshimura had learned of the Chotto Sokomade talent search underway by Sony Music Artists at the age of 18. After passing the company's audition, she moved on her own from Osaka to Tokyo, where she eventually met Ōnuki by chance in the Sony Music offices. Both felt alone within the large Sony organization and were not confident in their abilities as solo artists. Although Ōnuki had recorded a solo CD under the guidance of former Unicorn frontman Tamio Okuda, which later become half of solosolo, she and Yumi requested Sony pair them as a duo.

=== 1995–1997: Debut and beginnings ===
Producer and American pop musician Andy Sturmer christened them as "Puffy" and is considered by Ōnuki and Yoshimura as "the godfather of Puffy". Ami had previously met Tamio at a Sparks Gogo concert, and he had produced her then-unreleased solo CD. He was eventually signed on to produce the duo's first studio album, titled AmiYumi. Their debut single, "Asia no Junshin", launched a big craze known to some as "Puffy-mania". Asked if they were surprised by the attention after its success, Yumi told an interviewer "... everything that was put together for that song all came together and made it happen, but we didn't expect it. It was luck."

On July 13, 2005, their song Song of Origin (はじまりのうた, Hajimari no Uta) was used as the ending theme of the eighth Pokémon film: Pokémon: Lucario and the Mystery of Mew, as well as several ads for Daihatsu in their "Move Latte" campaign.

=== Puffy in the United States (2000–'06, 2017) ===
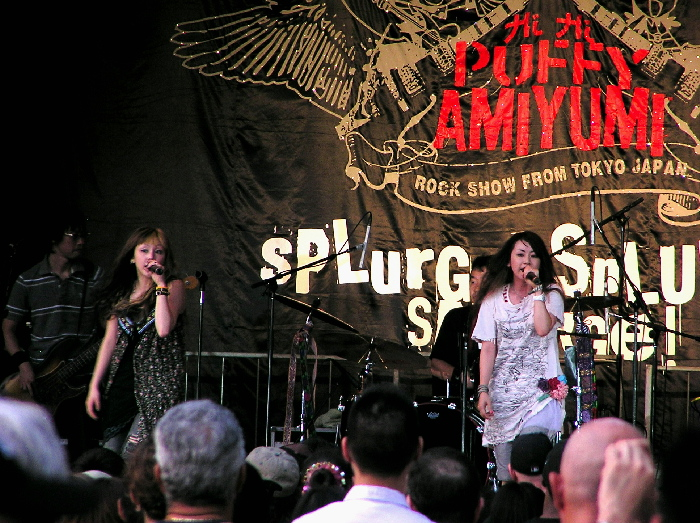
Puffy AmiYumi perform in New York City, dated 2006.

Puffy AmiYumi made its first appearance in the United States as part of Music Japan's "An Evening with Japan's All-Stars" showcase at the 2000 South by Southwest festival in Austin, Texas. Soon after their SXSW performance, attorneys for Sean "Puffy" Combs sent the band a cease and desist letter asking them to change their name. After adopting the new name "Puffy AmiYumi", they told Entertainment Weekly:

Yoshimura: It doesn't bother us at all. We respect the fact that Puff Daddy is Puffy in the U.S.
Ami: The bottom line is that we don't know what the word "Puffy" means. We were given our name by somebody else (Andy Sturmer) six years ago, and we really don't have a clue.

After Pa-Pa-Pa-Pa-Puffy ended production in 2002, Puffy AmiYumi focused on performing in the United States. Several of their previous Japanese albums were released for the US market and they recorded theme songs for the animated series Teen Titans and SD Gundam Force. They have also done a cover version with Cyndi Lauper of her hit "Girls Just Want to Have Fun". They also performed their songs "Hi Hi" and "Akai Buranko" on the show. They came back to the US in 2006 for their Splurge Tour, and also toured with Tally Hall for the Super-Ultimate Awesome Exploration tour the same year. In January 2017, they announced their Not Lazy tour to hold place in April. That same month, the band made an appearance at Anime Boston for autograph signings.

=== Animated series ===
On November 19, 2004, an animated series featuring fictionalized versions of the members – Hi Hi Puffy AmiYumi – premiered on the United States' Cartoon Network on their Friday night block, Fridays. The real Puffy AmiYumi portray themselves and star in short live-action segments video-recorded in Japan while the animated Ami and Yumi are voiced by American actresses Janice Kawaye and Grey DeLisle respectively. Yoshimura said in an interview with LiveDaily: "The Cartoon Network show has given us a great opportunity to introduce the music to a new audience. When we toured, after the Cartoon Network show started, so many little kids came to our show. We always wanted as many people as possible to listen to the music." The duo made an appearance and performed in the 2005 Macy's Thanksgiving Day Parade where they were also represented by their own Hi Hi Puffy AmiYumi float and balloon.

=== Other projects ===
On January 16, 2006, Puffy AmiYumi was appointed goodwill ambassadors to the United States as part of the Japanese government's campaign to encourage tourism in Japan. They also performed cameo voiceovers in episode 9 of the 2011 anime series, Bunny Drop, on July 8. They also performed the opening theme to the anime.

== Musical style ==
Puffy AmiYumi has collaborated with producer Tamio Okuda and American singer-songwriter Andy Sturmer. The duo's vocals have been compared to American vocal sister group the Roches.

== Members ==
- Ami Ōnuki
- Yumi Yoshimura
- Fumio Yanagisawa
- Takeshi Tsuji
- Hiroharu Kinoshita
- Takashi Furuta
- Junichi Fujimoto

== Discography ==
The following is a list of albums published under the names Puffy AmiYumi and their release dates.

- AmiYumi (1996)
- Solo Solo (1997)
- Jet CD (1998)
- Fever Fever (1999)
- Spike (2000)
- The Hit Parade (2002)
- Nice (early-mid 2003 in the US and Canada)
- 59 (2004)
- Splurge (2006)
- Honeycreeper (2007)
- Puffy AmiYumi x Puffy and Bring It! (2009)
- Thank You (2011)
- The Puffy (2021)

== Television works ==
- 1997–2000: Saku Saku Morning Call
- 1997–2002: Pa-Pa-Pa-Pa-Puffy
- 2003–2006: Teen Titans theme
- 2004–2006: Hi Hi Puffy AmiYumi
- 2006: Hi Hi Puffy Bu
- 2009: Dareka ga for Naruto Shippuden the Movie: The Will of Fire
- 2011: Bunny Drop (Episode 9 voiceover)
- 2013–present: Teen Titans Go! theme (remixed version of their own Teen Titans Theme)

== Notes ==
Preceded by Junko Miyama	Japan Record Award for Best New Artist; 1996	Succeeded by Rina Chinen
