= Jellyfish Comes Alive =

EP by Jellyfish
- Released: 1991
- Recorded: The Roxy and Bogart's, (Long Beach, California) and The Hard Rock Cafe (San Francisco)
- Genres: Power pop; jangle pop
- Length: 18:29
- Label: Charisma
- Producers: Albhy Galuten; Jack Joseph Puig

Jellyfish chronology
Bellybutton (1990)	Jellyfish Comes Alive (1991)	Spilt Milk (1993)

Professional ratings
Review scores
Source	Rating
Allmusic	4/5 stars

Jellyfish Comes Alive is a promotional EP released in 1991 by Jellyfish. It has live performances of songs from Bellybutton and covers of songs by Badfinger and Wings.

== Track listing ==
1. "No Matter What" – 2:54
2. "The King Is Half-Undressed" – 3:55
3. "Now She Knows She's Wrong" – 2:51
4. "Let 'Em In/That Is Why" – 4:51
5. "Jet" – 3:58

== Personnel ==
- Andy Sturmer - vocals, drums
- Roger Joseph Manning Jr. - keyboards, guitar, vocals
- Jason Falkner - guitar, vocals
- Chris Manning - bass, vocals
