= Best! (Jellyfish album) =

Greatest hits album by Jellyfish
- Released: May 6, 2006
- Genre: Power pop
- Length: 74:14
- Label: Virgin
- Producer: Albhy Galuten; Jack Joseph Puig; Andy Sturmer; Roger Joseph Manning Jr.

Jellyfish chronology
Fan Club (2002)	Best! (2006)	Radio Jellyfish (2013)

Best! is a greatest hits compilation by the 1990s pop band Jellyfish. The album was released in 2006 and featured twenty tracks. Twelve tracks were pulled from the band's two studio albums, Bellybutton and Spilt Milk. Four were live tracks, including a cover of Badfinger's "No Matter What," and two were demo recordings from the Spilt Milk session. "Ignorance is Bliss" was taken from Nintendo: White Knuckle Scorin', a various artists compilation with an accompanying storybook inspired by the video game Super Mario World. "Think About Your Troubles" was drawn from a 1995 Nilsson tribute album.

== Track listing ==
All songs written by Roger Manning and Andy Sturmer, except where noted.

1. "Joining a Fan Club" – 4:05 (from Spilt Milk)
2. "The King is Half Undressed" – 3:48 (from Bellybutton)
3. "New Mistake" – 4:03 (from Spilt Milk)
4. "Now She Knows She's Wrong" – 2:36 (from Bellybutton)
5. "Bye, Bye, Bye" – 4:03 (from Spilt Milk)
6. "Worthless Heart" – 3:06
7. "Baby's Coming Back" (Sturmer) – 2:58 (from Bellybutton)
8. "He's My Best Friend" – 3:44 (from Spilt Milk)
9. "All I Want is Everything" (Sturmer) – 3:45 (from Bellybutton)
10. "Let 'Em In/That is Why" (Paul McCartney)/(Manning/Sturmer) – 4:57
11. "No Matter What" (Pete Ham) – 2:50
12. "Family Tree" – 4:11
13. "The Ghost at Number One" – 3:37 (from Spilt Milk)
14. "Too Much, Too Little, Too Late" – 3:17 (from Spilt Milk)
15. "I Wanna Stay Home" (Sturmer) – 4:06 (from Bellybutton)
16. "Glutton of Sympathy" – 3:49 (from Spilt Milk)
17. "The Man I Used to Be" – 4:46
18. "Calling Sarah" – 4:03
19. "Ignorance is Bliss" (Sturmer/Wirt) – 3:59 (from Nintendo: White Knuckle Scorin')
20. "Think About Your Troubles" (Harry Nilsson) – 2:35

Tracks 6 and 12 are demo recordings.

Tracks 10, 11, 17 and 18 are live recordings.
