= Now She Knows She's Wrong =

Single by Jellyfish

from the album Bellybutton
- B-side: "Bedspring Kiss"
- Released: 1991
- Recorded: Various: Bill Schnee Studios; (Los Angeles, CA); Ocean Way Recording; (Hollywood, CA); Studio 55; (Los Angeles, CA)
- Genre: Power pop; alternative rock
- Length: 2:35
- Label: Charisma
- Songwriter(s): Roger Manning; Andy Sturmer
- Producer(s): Albhy Galuten; Jack Joseph Puig

Jellyfish singles chronology
"Baby's Coming Back" (1990)	"Now She Knows She's Wrong" (1991)	"I Wanna Stay Home" (1991)

"Now She Knows She's Wrong" is a song by the American power pop group Jellyfish. It is the fourth single released in support of their 1990 debut album Bellybutton.

== Formats and track listing ==
European 7" single (CUSS 3)

1. "Now She Knows She's Wrong" – 2:35
2. "Bedspring Kiss" – 5:02
3. "She Still Loves Him" (live) – 4:11
4. "Baby's Coming Back" (live) – 2:57

European 12" single (Cust 3)

1. "Now She Knows She's Wrong" – 2:35
2. "Bedspring Kiss" – 5:02
3. "The Man I Used to Be" (live) – 4:46
4. "Calling Sarah" (live) – 4:02

European CD single (CUSCD 3)

1. "Now She Knows She's Wrong" – 2:35
2. "Bedspring Kiss" – 5:02
3. "Let 'Em In"/"That Is Why" (live) – 4:56
4. "The King Is Half-Undressed" (live) – 3:43

== Charts ==
Chart (1991)	Peak position
UK Singles (OCC)	49
