= The Lickerish Quartet (band) =

American rock band

- From left: Dover, Manning, and Smith

Background information
- Origin: Los Angeles, California, U.S.
- Genres: Rock
- Years active: 2017–2022
- Members: Roger Manning; Eric Dover; Tim Smith
- Website: thelickerishquartet.com

The Lickerish Quartet was an American rock band formed in Los Angeles in 2017. The group consists of keyboardist Roger Manning, guitarist Eric Dover, and bassist Tim Smith, each of whom were former members of the band Jellyfish. They released the EP Threesome Vol. 1 in May 2020, Threesome Vol. 2 in January 2021, and Threesome Vol. 3 on May 20, 2022.

== Background ==
Keyboardist Roger Manning, guitarist Eric Dover, and bassist Tim Smith were formerly members of Jellyfish. Dover joined the band during the 1993 tour supporting their second album Spilt Milk. After their breakup in 1994, Manning and Dover formed Imperial Drag, a band which lasted until 1997. Meanwhile, Smith formed one-half of the band Umajets and recorded the 1995 album Demolotion with help from Manning and Dover. This marked the last time the three musicians played together until 2017.

By the 2010s, Smith had relocated to Atlanta, while Manning and Dover stayed in Los Angeles. The Lickerish Quartet began forming in early 2017 when Manning reached out to Smith with the intent "to continue in the tradition of a lot of the pop/rock stylings" that he had appreciated. He then reached out to Dover as well. Without the direct goal of recording, the trio got together for several writing sessions, each lasting around a week long, and ultimately produced 12 songs. Jeremy Stacey was recruited to play drums on the recordings.

Ex-Jellyfish frontman Andy Sturmer was not offered to participate. According to Manning, this was because the group was only ever intended to be a collaboration with Smith and Dover, and that Sturmer had "made it very apparent to us and the industry over the years that he's not interested in any kind of post-Jellyfish activity, and that's fine."

In March 2020, the Lickerish Quartet announced that they would have three EPs released by September 2021. The first, Threesome Vol. 1, yielded four songs and was issued on May 15 through Lickerish Quartet/Label Logic. The second, Threesome Vol. 2, was released on January 8, 2021, with its first single Snollygoster Goon arriving on November 19, 2020.

On November 18, 2022, the band made an announcement on their Facebook page stating, "...we have decided to let The Lickerish Quartet fold into our memories for good. What started in 2017 to collaborate together with our pal Jeremy Stacey on drums fulfilled so many dreams for us”, effectively putting an end to the band. The message concluded by thanking the fans for "listening, following, and encouraging" them over the last 6 years. The message was signed by the three members and featured a photo of the band with drummer Jeremy Stacey.

== Members ==
- Eric Dover
- Roger Manning
- Tim Smith

== Discography ==
The "Threesome Vol. 1" cover art, as designed by Tim Smith

Studio albums

Title	Details
Fables From Fearless Heights	Release: June 29, 2022; Label: Sony Music Labels Inc.

Extended plays

Title	Details
Threesome Vol. 1	Release: May 15, 2020; Label: Lickerish Quartet/Label Logic
Threesome Vol. 2	Release: January 8, 2021; Label: Lickerish Quartet/Stranger Danger Records and Tapes
Threesome Vol. 3	Release: May 20, 2022; Label: Lickerish Quartet/Stranger Danger Records and Tapes

Singles

Year	Song
2020	"Lighthouse Spaceship"
2020	"Fadoodle"
2020	"Snollygoster Goon"
