= New Mistake =

1993 single by Jellyfish

Single by Jellyfish

from the album Spilt Milk
- B-side: "He's My Best Friend"
- Released: July 5, 1993
- Length: 4:02
- Label: Charisma
- Songwriter(s): Roger Manning; Andy Sturmer
- Producer(s): Albhy Galuten; Roger Manning; Jack Joseph Puig; Andy Sturmer

Jellyfish singles chronology
"The Ghost at Number One" (1993)	"New Mistake" (1993)

"New Mistake" is a song by American power pop group Jellyfish, released as the second single from their 1993 second and final studio album, Spilt Milk (1993).

== Track listings ==
European 7-inch single (CUSS 11)

1. "New Mistake" – 4:02
2. "He's My Best Friend" – 3:44

European CD1 single (CUSDG 11)

1. "New Mistake" – 4:02
2. "He's My Best Friend" – 3:44
3. "All Is Forgiven" (demo) – 4:09
4. "Russian Hill" (demo) – 4:43

European CD2 single (CUSCD 11)

1. "New Mistake" – 4:02
2. "Sebrina, Paste And Plato" (demo) – 2:12
3. "The Man I Used to Be" (demo) – 4:23
4. "Bedspring Kiss" (demo) – 4:47

US CD single (V25H-12663)

1. "New Mistake" – 4:02
2. "Ignorance Is Bliss" – 3:58
3. "Worthless Heart" (demo) – 3:06
4. "Baby's Coming Back" (live) – 3:05

== Charts ==
Chart (1993)	Peak position
Iceland (Íslenski Listinn Topp 40)	30
UK Singles (OCC)	55

== Release history ==
Region	Date	Format(s)	Label(s)	Ref.
United Kingdom	July 5, 1993	7-inch vinyl; CD1; cassette	Virgin; Charisma	
United Kingdom	July 19, 1993	CD2	Virgin; Charisma	
Japan	September 1, 1993	CD	Virgin; Charisma	
