= The Ghost at Number One =

1993 single by Jellyfish

Single by Jellyfish

from the album Spilt Milk
- B-side: "All Is Forgiven"
- Released: 1993
- Length: 3:37
- Label: Charisma
- Songwriter(s): Roger Manning; Andy Sturmer
- Producer(s): Albhy Galuten; Roger Manning; Jack Joseph Puig; Andy Sturmer

Jellyfish singles chronology
"I Wanna Stay Home" (1991)	"The Ghost at Number One" (1993)	"New Mistake" (1993)

"The Ghost at Number One" is a song by the American power pop group Jellyfish. It is the first single released in support of their 1993 album Spilt Milk.

== Track listings ==
European 7-inch single (CUSS 10)

1. "The Ghost at Number One" (edit) – 3:25
2. "All Is Forgiven" – 4:10

European CD1 single (CUSDG 10)

1. "The Ghost at Number One" (edit) – 3:25
2. "All Is Forgiven" – 4:10
3. "Worthless Heart" – 3:07
4. "Ignorance Is Bliss" – 3:58

European CD2 single (CUSCD 10)

1. "The Ghost at Number One" (edit) – 3:25
2. "All Is Forgiven" – 4:10
3. "Watchin' the Rain" – 4:10
4. "Family Tree" – 4:10

== Charts ==
Chart (1993)	Peak position
US Alternative Airplay (Billboard)	9
UK Singles (OCC)	43
