= I Wanna Stay Home =

Single by Jellyfish

from the album Bellybutton
- B-side: "Jet" (live)
- Released: 1991
- Recorded: Various: Bill Schnee Studios; (Los Angeles, CA); Ocean Way Recording; (Hollywood, CA); Studio 55; (Los Angeles, CA)
- Genre: Alternative rock
- Length: 4:05
- Label: Charisma
- Songwriter: Andy Sturmer
- Producers: Albhy Galuten; Jack Joseph Puig

Jellyfish singles chronology
"Now She Knows She's Wrong" (1991)	"I Wanna Stay Home" (1991)	"The Ghost at Number One" (1993)

"I Wanna Stay Home" is a song by the American power pop group Jellyfish. It is the fifth and final single released in support of their 1990 debut album Bellybutton. It is a melancholic ballad about regret and longing for safety and security, especially the kind found in home and familiarity.

== Formats and track listing ==
European 7" single (CUSS 4)

1. "I Wanna Stay Home" – 4:06
2. "Jet" (live) – 3:22

European CD single (CUSDG 4)

1. "I Wanna Stay Home" – 4:05
2. "Jet" (live) – 3:09
3. "Now She Knows She's Wrong" (live) – 2:45

== Charts ==
Chart (1991)	Peak position
UK Singles (OCC)	59
UK Airplay (Music Week)	48
