= Imperial Drag (album) =

Studio album by Imperial Drag
- Released: May 7, 1996
- Genre: Glam rock; power pop; post-grunge
- Length: 57:25
- Label: Work
- Producer: Brad Jones; Roger Joseph Manning, Jr.

Imperial Drag chronology
Imperial Drag (1996)	Demos (2005)

Professional ratings
Review scores
Source	Rating
AllMusic	4/5 stars
Los Angeles Times	3/4 stars
Rolling Stone	2/5 stars

Imperial Drag is the debut studio album by American rock band Imperial Drag, released on May 7, 1996, by Work.

The album was supported with a single and music video for the song, "Boy or a Girl" (which reached No. 30 on the Billboard Modern Rock chart and No. 54 on the UK singles chart), alongside a promotional single for the song, "Spyder".

Imperial Drag was the only studio album released by the group. A collection of demos (titled Demos) was released in 2005 through the (now defunct) Weedshare music distribution service.

== Track listings ==
=== CD: OK 67378 ===
All songs written by Eric Dover and Roger Joseph Manning, Jr.

1. "Zodiac Sign" – 3:29
2. "Boy or a Girl" – 4:05
3. "Crosseyed" – 3:43
4. "The Man in the Moon" – 4:22
5. ""Breakfast" by Tiger (Kiss It All Goodbye)" – 4:22
6. "Playboy After Dark" – 3:09
7. "Illuminate" – 4:52
8. "Spyder" – 4:50
9. "Overnight Sensation" – 4:40
10. "The Salvation Army Band" – 3:58
11. "Dandelion" – 2:50
12. "Stare into the Sun" – 5:16
13. "Scaredy Cats and Egomaniacs" – 4:57
14. "Down with the Man" (uncredited bonus track) – 2:52

=== Japanese CD: SRCS 8050 ===
1. "Zodiac Sign" – 3:29
2. "Boy Or A Girl" – 4:05
3. "Crosseyed" – 3:43
4. "The Man In The Moon" – 4:22
5. ""Breakfast" by Tiger (Kiss It All Goodbye)" – 4:22
6. "Playboy After Dark" – 3:09
7. "Illuminate" – 4:52
8. "Spyder" – 4:50
9. "Overnight Sensation" – 4:40
10. "The Salvation Army Band" – 3:58
11. "Dandelion" – 2:50
12. "Stare Into The Sun" – 5:16
13. "Scaredy Cats And Egomaniacs" – 4:57
14. "Hey Honey Please" (bonus track) – 5:51
15. "Down With The Man" (bonus track) – 2:52

== Personnel ==
=== Musicians ===
- Eric Skodis - drums, vocals
- Joseph Karnes - bass guitar, vocals
- Roger Joseph Manning, Jr. - keyboards, vocals
- Eric Dover - lead vocals, guitar

=== Additional musicians ===
- Mark Pfaff - harmonica on "Stare into the Sun"
- Phill Cassens - Vibraslap solo on "Spyder"

=== Samples ===
- Dialogue from The Prisoner television series episode "Dance of the Dead" (4)

=== Production ===
- All songs arranged by Imperial Drag and Brad Jones
- Produced by Brad Jones and Roger Joseph Manning, Jr.
- Recorded by Brad Jones at House of Blues Studio, Encino, CA. Assisted by Howard Willing
- Mixed by Brad Jones and Roger Joseph Manning, Jr. at Ocean Way Studios, Hollywood, CA. Assisted by Richard Huredia
- Mastered by Eddy Schreyer at Future Disc

=== Credits ===
- Art direction - Stephen Walker
- Photography - Beth Herzhaft
