= Everything Changed =

Everything Changed may refer to:

- Everything Changed (album), 2004 studio album by American singer-songwriter Abra Moore
- Everything Changed..., 2019 EP by American musical duo Social House
