= Fan Club (Jellyfish album) =

Box set by Jellyfish

Box set by Jellyfish
- Released: August 2002
- Genre: Power pop
- Length: 277:24
- Label: Not Lame
- Producers: Albhy Galuten; Jack Joseph Puig; Andy Sturmer; Roger Manning

Jellyfish chronology
Spilt Milk (1993)	Fan Club (2002)	Best! (2006)

Professional ratings
Review scores
Source	Rating
AllMusic	4.5/5 stars

Fan Club is a box set of demos, rarities and live performances by American power pop band Jellyfish. The box set was released in limited quantity by Not Lame Recordings in August 2002. Fan Club contains demos from the band's 1990 debut, Bellybutton, and their 1993 sophomore follow-up, Spilt Milk. The box set also contains recordings of live performances, rehearsals, compilation track appearances, and interview snippets.

Label owner Bruce Brodeen worked on the project for over 15 months, and to complete it, sought a bank loan that exceeded $100,000 (equivalent to $180,000 in 2025). The remastering alone cost over $10,000. Not Lame amassed over 1,600 advance orders from fans, while another 3,400 advance orders came from distributors. Three pressings (8,000 copies) sold out by the end of the year. The set went out of print within months due to the expiration of the label's rights to the Jellyfish catalog, making it a collector's item.

== Track listing ==
=== Disc One: The Bellybutton Demos, 1988–'89 ===
1. "The Man I Used To Be"
2. "Bedspring Kiss"
3. "Deliver"
4. "Now She Knows She's Wrong"
5. "Queen Of The USA"
6. "Always Be My Girl"
7. "I Wanna Stay Home"
8. "Let This Dream Never End"
9. "Season Of The Witch"
10. "That Girls A Man"
11. "Calling Sarah"
12. "All I Want Is Everything"
13. "Bye Bye Bye"
14. "She Still Loves Him"
15. "Baby's Coming Back"
16. "The King Is Half Undressed"

=== Disc Two: The Bellybutton Tour (A.K.A. "The Innie Through The Outtie Tour"), 1990–'91 ===
1. "MTV Top Of The Hour"
2. "(Much Music Canada)"
3. "The King Is Half Undressed" (Live At The Roxy)
4. "Sugar And Spice" (Live At The Roxy)
5. "(91X San Diego)"
6. "Two All Beef Patties" (Live At The Roxy)
7. "Mr Late" (Live At The Roxy)
8. "No Matter What" (Live At The Roxy)
9. "All I Want Is Everything" (Live At The Roxy)
10. "(Much Music Canada)"
11. "Hold Your Head Up Hello" (Live At Bogarts)
12. "Calling Sarah" (Live At Bogarts)
13. "She Still Loves Him" (Live At Bogarts)
14. "Will You Marry Me" (Live At Bogarts)
15. "Baby Come Back Baby's Coming Back" (Live At Bogarts)
16. "Now She Knows Shes Wrong" (Live At Bogarts)
17. "Let Em In That Is Why" (Live At Bogarts)
18. "Jet" (Live At The Hard Rock)
19. "(Much Music Canada)"
20. "The King Is Half Undressed" (Live At Wembley)
21. "Baby's Coming Back" (Live At Wembley)
22. "I Wanna Stay Home" (Live At Wembley)
23. "She Still Loves Him" (Live At Wembley)
24. "All I Want Is Everything" (Live At Wembley)

=== Disc Three: The Spilt Milk Demos, 1991–'92 ===
1. "(World Cafe)"
2. "Spilt Milk Intro"
3. "Hush"
4. "Joining A Fan Club"
5. "Sebrina Paste And Plato"
6. "New Mistake"
7. "Glutton Of Sympathy"
8. "The Ghost At Number One"
9. "All Is Forgiven"
10. "Russian Hill"
11. "Hes My Best Friend"
12. "Family Tree"
13. "Spilt Milk Outtro"
14. "Ignorance Is Bliss"
15. "Worthless Heart"
16. "Watchin The Rain"
17. "I Need Love"
18. "I Dont Believe You"
19. "Long Time Ago"
20. "Runnin For Our Lives"
21. "Fan Club Message"

=== Disc Four: The Spilt Milk Tour, 1993 ===
1. "Glutton Of Sympathy" (Live Rehearsal)
2. "Baby's Coming Back" (Live on Dutch TV)
3. "That Is Why" (Live on World Cafe)
4. "The Ghost At Number One" (Live on World Cafe)
5. "Joining A Fan Club" (Live on World Cafe)
6. "(World Cafe)"
7. "I Can Hear The Grass Grow" (Live on Australian Radio)
8. "New Mistake" (Live On Japanese Radio)
9. "Eleanor Rigby" (Live On Japanese TV)
10. "S.O.S." (Live on Japanese TV)
11. "S.O.S." (Live at Club Quatro Japan)
12. "All Is Forgiven" (Live at Universal Amphitheatre)
13. "Sebrina Paste And Plato" (Live at Universal Amphitheatre)
14. "Joining A Fan Club" (Live at Universal Amphitheatre)
15. "The Ghost At Number One" (Live at Universal Amphitheatre)
16. "The Man I Used To Be" (Live at Universal Amphitheatre)
17. "Glutton Of Sympathy" (Live at Universal Amphitheatre)
18. "New Mistake" (Live at Universal Amphitheatre)
19. "Think About Your Troubles"

== Personnel ==
- Andy Sturmer – vocals, drums, keyboards, guitar
- Roger Manning – keyboards, vocals
- Jason Falkner – guitars, bass, vocals
- Chris Manning – bass, vocals
- Eric Dover – guitar, vocals
- Tim Smith – bass, vocals
