= Four Leaf Clover (song) =

1997 single by Abra Moore

Single by Abra Moore

from the album Strangest Places
- B-side: "Guitar Song"
- Released: April 14, 1997
- Recorded: 1996
- Studio: Cedar Creek Recording (Austin, Texas)
- Length: 3:32
- Label: Arista Austin
- Songwriter: Abra Moore
- Producer: Mitch Watkins

Abra Moore singles chronology
| "Four Leaf Clover" (1997) | "Strangest Places" (1997) |

Music video
- "Four Leaf Clover" on YouTube

"Four Leaf Clover" is a song by American folk-rock singer Abra Moore. Written by Moore and produced by Mitch Watkins, the song was released as Moore's debut single and as the lead single from her first studio album, Strangest Places (1997). The song became a hit in the United States, topping the Billboard Triple-A chart, and also reached the top 40 in Canada. The song's music video, directed by Nancy Bardawil, shows Moore performing the track outdoors and in several rooms. At the 40th Annual Grammy Awards, the song was nominated for Best Female Rock Vocal Performance.

== Background and release ==
Abra Moore began recording Strangest Places in October 1996, doing so at Cedar Creek Recording in Austin, Texas. Before the album had finished completion, the Austin branch of Arista Records asked several radio stations across the United States for their opinions on the album as well as which songs would have the greatest commercial potential, a process that took three to four months. Response was so positive that Arista Austin decided to release the album two months earlier than scheduled, in May 1997. "Four Leaf Clover", the album's opening track, was sent to US modern rock, college rock and adult album alternative radio stations as the album's lead single on April 14, 1997. The song was later released as a 7-inch single, cassette single, and Minimax CD single in the US, with the CD containing album track "Guitar Song" as a B-side. In 1998, a CD single was issued in the United Kingdom, but the song did not chart.

== Critical reception ==
In 1998, "Four Leaf Clover" was nominated for Best Female Rock Vocal Performance at the 40th Annual Grammy Awards, losing to "Criminal" by Fiona Apple; as of 2026, it is Moore's only nomination in any category. The same year, The Austin Chronicle awarded the track the Austin Music Award for Song of the Year.

== Chart performance ==
"Four Leaf Clover" first appeared on the US Billboard Triple-A chart on May 10, 1997, debuting at number 14. The song rose into the top 10 the following week, then into the top five on June 14, when it jumped to number two. On June 21, the single ascended to number one, where it stayed for one week only. At the end of the year, Billboard placed it at number 13 on the Triple-A year-end chart. On the Billboard Modern Rock Tracks chart, the song debuted at number 40 on May 24, 1997, and took five more weeks to reach its peak of number 27. The track also appeared on the Adult Top 40 ranking, where it peaked at number 23 on August 23.

On July 17, 1997, "Four Leaf Clover" debuted at number 70 on the US Billboard Hot 100 chart. After spending two more weeks at that position, it rose to number 66 on August 9, then to its peak of number 63 one week later. It spent 13 weeks on the listing, last appearing at number 96 on October 11, 1997. In Canada, the single appeared on the RPM 100 Hit Tracks chart, making its debut at number 93 on July 21, 1997. Four weeks later, on August 18, it entered the top 40, ascending to its highest position of number 39. Afterwards, "Four Leaf Clover" spent 12 more weeks within the top 100, leaving from number 96 on November 17.

== Music video ==
The music video for "Four Leaf Clover" was directed by Nancy Bardawil. It shows Moore singing the song as she wanders through several different natural environments, including a deciduous forest, a tropical rainforest, and a flower garden, as well as in front of a forest backdrop. She also performs in front of a house backdrop, an open-air room with flowers on the ground, and a room with striped purple walls. The video was added to the playlists of VH1 and M2 on the week ending May 11, 1997. The following week, on May 18, it was added to The Box. Moore later stated that she was surprised to see the video air on M2, believing they would not be eager to search for new acts.

== Track listings ==
US Minimax CD single

1. "Four Leaf Clover" – 3:32
2. "Guitar Song" – 5:00

US 7-inch single

A. "Four Leaf Clover" – 3:32
B. "Four Leaf Clover" (alternate version) – 3:31

US cassette single

1. "Four Leaf Clover" – 3:32

UK CD single

1. "Four Leaf Clover" – 3:32
2. "Four Leaf Clover" (unplugged) – 3:36
3. "Guitar Song" (unplugged) – 4:54

== Credits and personnel ==
Credits are lifted from the Strangest Places album booklet.

Studios

- Recorded at Cedar Creek Recording (Austin, Texas)
- Additional recording at The Boiler Room, The Institute (Austin, Texas), and Meridian Studio (San Antonio, Texas)
- Mixed at Oceanway Recording (Hollywood, California)
- Mastered at Gateway Mastering (Portland, Maine, US)

Personnel

- Abra Moore – writing, vocals, tambourine, recording assistance
- Mitch Watkins – acoustic and electric guitars, bass, keyboards, shaker, sequence programming, production, additional recording
- Brannen Temple – drums
- Mike McCarthy – recording, additional recording
- Jack Joseph Puig – mixing
- Jim Champagne – assistant mix engineering
- Fred Remmert – syncing
- Bob Ludwig – mastering
- Brian Lee – additional mastering

== Charts ==
=== Weekly charts ===
| Chart (1997) | Peak position |
|---|---|
| Canada Top Singles (RPM) | 39 |
| US Billboard Hot 100 | 63 |
| US Adult Top 40 (Billboard) | 23 |
| US Modern Rock Tracks (Billboard) | 27 |
| US Triple-A (Billboard) | 1 |

=== Year-end charts ===
| Chart (1997) | Position |
|---|---|
| US Triple-A (Billboard) | 13 |
