= That's Why =

"That's Why" can refer to the following:

- That's Why (album), a 2008 album by Craig Morgan, and the title song
- "That's Why", a 1991 single by The Party, from the album The Party
- "That's Why", a 2019 song by Illenium, from the album Ascend
- "That's Why", a 1982 song by Michael McDonald, from the album If That's What It Takes
- "That's Why (I Love You So)", a 1959 single by Jackie Wilson
- "That's Why (You Go Away)", a 1995 single by Danish band Michael Learns to Rock

== See also ==
- "That Is Why", a 1990 single by the band Jellyfish
