= Baby's Coming Back =

Single by Jellyfish

from the album Bellybutton
- B-side: "All I Want Is Everything" (live)
- Released: 1990
- Recorded: Various: Bill Schnee Studios; (Los Angeles, CA); Ocean Way Recording; (Hollywood, CA); Studio 55; (Los Angeles, CA)
- Genre: Pop rock; power pop
- Length: 2:55
- Label: Charisma
- Songwriter: Andy Sturmer
- Producers: Albhy Galuten; Jack Joseph Puig

Jellyfish singles chronology
"That Is Why" (1990)	"Baby's Coming Back" (1990)	"Now She Knows She's Wrong" (1991)

"Baby's Coming Back" is a song by the American power pop group Jellyfish, released in 1990 by Charisma Records, as the third single from their debut album, Bellybutton (1990). It peaked at numbers 46 and 62 on the US Cash Box Top 100 and Billboard Hot 100 charts, and number 51 on the UK Singles Chart.

== Reception ==
Juke said, "Almost unbearably chirpy and good-natured, it's a warm, wet-nosed puppy of a record that follows you home and snuggles in before you realise it.

== Formats and track listing ==
- European 7" single (CUSS 2)
1. "Baby's Coming Back" – 2:55
2. "All I Want Is Everything" (live) – 4:42
- European CD single (CUST 2)
1. "Baby's Coming Back" – 2:55
2. "No Matter What" (live) – 2:50
3. "All I Want Is Everything" (live) – 4:42

== Charts ==
Chart (1991)	Peak position
UK Singles (Official Charts)	51
UK Airplay (Music Week)	47
US Billboard Hot 100	62
US Cash Box Top 100	46

== Cover versions ==
- English power pop band McFly released a cover version in 2007 as part of their "Baby's Coming Back/Transylvania" double A-side which topped the UK Singles Chart.
