= Weight of the World (Ringo Starr song) =

- UK 7" vinyl picture sleeve

Single by Ringo Starr

from the album Time Takes Time
- B-side: "After All These Years"; "Don't Be Cruel" (CD only)
- Released: 28 April 1992 (US); 18 May 1992 (UK)
- Recorded: February–September 1991, February 1992
- Genre: Rock
- Length: 3:54
- Label: Private Music
- Songwriters: Brian O'Doherty, Fred Velez
- Producer: Don Was

Ringo Starr singles chronology
"In My Car" (1983)	"Weight of the World" (1992)	"Don't Go Where the Road Don't Go" (1992)

"Weight of the World" is a song performed by English musician and actor Ringo Starr, released on his tenth album, Time Takes Time (1992). Written by Brian O'Doherty and Fred Velez, the song was released by Private Music as a lead single backed with "After All These Years", and "Don't Be Cruel" (the latter was only on the CD single). The single reached 74 in the UK charts. It was released on 28 April 1992 in the US, (Note: US Private Music 01005-81003-2) and on 18 May in the UK. (Note: 7": UK Private Music 115 392; CD: UK Private Music 665 392)

== Music video ==
An accompanying music video was filmed in March 1992 and premiered on MTV and VH1 in May 1992, the video features Starr performing at a Circus in a theatre on a balance scale along with Jellyfish members Andy Sturmer and Roger Joseph Manning Jr. providing background vocals as they did on the recording, also Starr can be seen playing his drums in some shots along with his band including his best friend Joe Walsh playing guitar. Also, in some shots featured a strong powerlifter (played by a professional wrestler) lifting weights with globes on the sides (the weights were actually light props), a scientist, dancers, and a juggler.

== Track listing ==
- 7" single
1. "Weight of the World" (Brian O'Doherty, Fred Velez) – 3:54
2. "After All These Years" (Richard Starkey, Johnny Warman) – 3:10
- CD single
1. "Weight of the World" (O'Doherty, Velez) – 3:54
2. "After All These Years" (Starkey, Warman) – 3:10
3. "Don't Be Cruel" (Otis Blackwell, Elvis Presley) – 2:08

== Personnel ==
- Ringo Starr – drums, percussion, vocals
- James Hutchinson – bass
- Mark Goldenberg – guitar
- Benmont Tench – keyboards
- Andy Sturmer, Roger Joseph Manning Jr - backing vocals

== Charts ==
Chart (1992)	Peak position
Australia (ARIA)	142
Canada Top Singles (RPM)	61
Germany (GfK)	51
Sweden (Sverigetopplistan)	37
Switzerland (Schweizer Hitparade)	21
UK Singles (OCC)	74
UK Airplay (Music Week)	50
US Mainstream Rock (Billboard)	43
