= Nintendo: White Knuckle Scorin' =

Compilation album by various artists
- Released: December 2, 1991
- Genre: Rock
- Length: 41:12
- Label: MCA
- Producer: Ken Kushnick; David Passick

Singles from Nintendo: White Knuckle Scorin'
- 1. "I Drove All Night" Released: June 22, 1992

Nintendo: White Knuckle Scorin' is a compilation album licensed by Nintendo and released by MCA Records in 1991. It was dedicated to Bobby Brooks, a talent agent who died in the 1990 helicopter crash that also killed Stevie Ray Vaughan. The stated purpose of the compilation was to promote literacy among children (one of Brooks' favorite causes) and "tap the Nintendo youth market" (he was described as a Nintendo fan). Most of the artists featured on the record had employed Brooks in some capacity.

A booklet enclosed with the CD featured a comic story based loosely on the Super NES game Super Mario World. Despite these connections, only one track on the album references the Super Mario franchise, "Ignorance Is Bliss", performed by the power pop band Jellyfish, who were asked to contribute to the record. Frontman Andy Sturmer modeled the song's lyrics after the comic, which depicts the character King Bowser's resentment for literacy. Also included on the album was a previously unreleased song recorded by the late Roy Orbison, "I Drove All Night".

== Background ==
According to a contemporary report by the Los Angeles Times, White Knuckle Scorin' was dedicated to booking agent and "Nintendo player" Bobby Brooks, who died in the helicopter crash that also killed Stevie Ray Vaughan in 1990. The report says that "MCA Chairman Al Teller had long been thinking about doing an album to tap the Nintendo youth market (he's a Nintendo ace himself) and he decided to combine that idea with a tribute to Brooks, who was widely admired in the industry. Some proceeds from the album will go to start a foundation to benefit a favorite Brooks cause: literacy."

Brooks was the agent of many of the other artists who appear on the record: Roy Orbison, Crosby Stills & Nash, Dire Straits, Flesh for Lulu and Sheena Easton. The compilation marked the debut of "I Drove All Night", the first new song by Orbison (who died in 1988) since the release of his last album Mystery Girl (1989). In the Los Angeles Times article, widow Barbara Orbison said: "I know about the obsession some kids have with these games. But this project will give to kids with literacy problems and maybe even get to kids that are playing Nintendo too much."

== "Ignorance Is Bliss" ==
A booklet enclosed with the CD featured a comic story that was loosely based on the Super NES game Super Mario World. It reflects the stated aim of the compilation: Princess Toadstool helps Yoshi and the Koopalings learn to read, however, to the chagrin of King Bowser, who persistently remarks that "ignorance is bliss". At various points, the characters pause mid-panel and announce "SONG CUE" to advise the reader to listen to a track on the CD. However, only the opening track, "Ignorance Is Bliss", references any aspect of the comic or Nintendo franchises.

"Ignorance Is Bliss" was written by Jellyfish frontman Andy Sturmer and his then-girlfriend Sarah Wirt while the group were making their second album Spilt Milk (1993). In the liner notes to the 2002 compilation Fan Club, Sturmer described the song as a "mini opera" that was "a lot of fun to write." Asked about the song in a 2017 interview, bandmate Roger Manning elaborated that the group were asked to contribute a song to the compilation, and that the album's original intention was to center on various Nintendo characters. He said that although the band had no particular interest in video games, "Andy took it upon himself to make sure the lyric was relevant. He loved the challenge of creating a lyric that expanded upon the story line and characters of that Nintendo album."

== Music video ==
A music video for Roy Orbison's "I Drove All Night" single was made. Along with appearances by Jason Priestley and Jennifer Connelly mixed with archive footage of Orbison, the video featured subtle background references to the Mario series and the album's title.

== Reception ==
Professional ratings
Review scores
| Source | Rating |
|---|---|
| AllMusic | 4/5 stars |
| Chicago Tribune | 2/4 stars |

Reviewing the album for the Chicago Tribune, Mark Caro wrote that it was "a strange compilation under the banner of product tie-in. The 10 songs included all apparently appear in Nintendo video games [sic], though they don't share much else in common. ... Only the kickoff track, Jellyfish's 'Ignorance Is Bliss,' captures the loony, cartoony hyperdrive that seems fitting for such a soundtrack."

== Track listing ==
| No. | Title | Writer(s) | Performer(s) | Length |
|---|---|---|---|---|
| 1. | "Ignorance Is Bliss" | Andy Sturmer, Sarah Wirt | Jellyfish | 3:57 |
| 2. | "How Have You Been?" | John Sebastian | Crosby, Stills & Nash | 3:48 |
| 3. | "Magic in the Night" | Roxy Petrucci, Jan Kuehnemund, Harry Paress, Bill Cuomo | Bombshell | 5:18 |
| 4. | "I Drove All Night" | Billy Steinberg, Tom Kelly | Roy Orbison | 3:44 |
| 5. | "Iron Hand" | Mark Knopfler | Dire Straits | 3:05 |
| 6. | "Into the Fire" | Freddy Curci, Steve DeMarchi | Alias | 4:35 |
| 7. | "She Was" | Derek Greening, Nick Marsh, Rocco Baker | Flesh for Lulu | 3:57 |
| 8. | "Line of Fire" | Steve Brown, Dean Fasano, Bill Wray | Trixter | 4:40 |
| 9. | "Turn On" | Billy Childs, Tommy Paris | Britny Fox | 3:43 |
| 10. | "Forever Friends" | Jeff Lorber, Oliver Leiber | Sheena Easton | 4:25 |
| Total length: | | | | 41:12 |
