= MENEW =

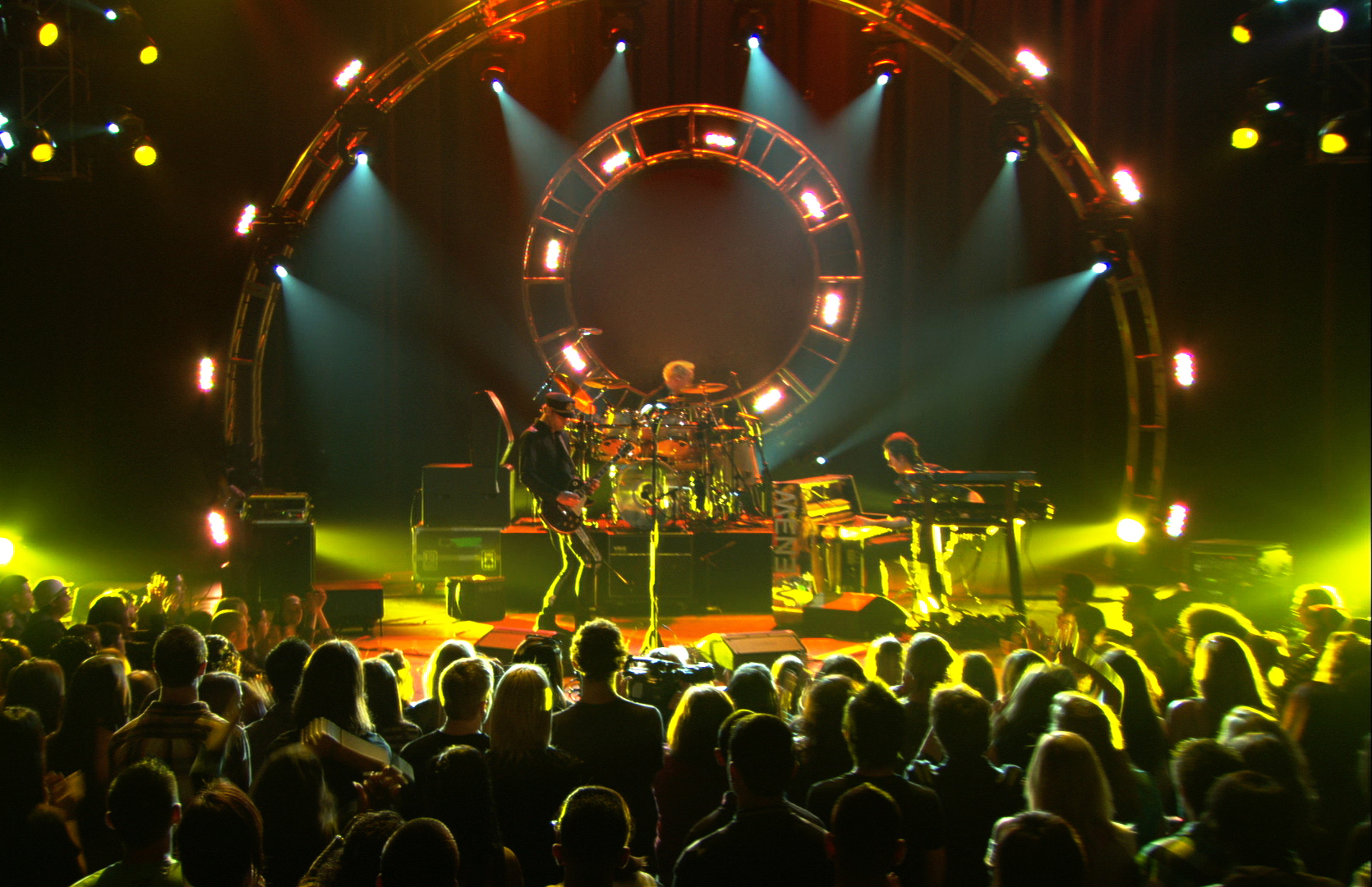
- MENEW performing at The Grove in Anaheim in 2011

Background information
- Also known as: MENEW, MNW, MENU
- Origin: Toronto, Ontario, Canada
- Genres: Alternative rock, indie rock
- Years active: 2007–present
- Labels: RedCore Music Group, The Orchard
- Members: Shade; Key; Nathan Samuel Phillip
- Website: www.menew.com

MENEW are an alternative indie rock band from Cambridge, Ontario, Canada, consisting of three brothers; Shade (lead vocals, guitar), Key (piano, synthesizers) and Nathan Samuel Phillip (drums, vocals). They have released three albums and one EP and toured North America.

== Career ==
=== Formation and early development (early years up to 2007) ===
The Klaas brothers grew up on a farm in a rural part of Cambridge, Ontario. At five years of age, they were given formal music training. The name of the band was created when the trio was rehearsing in their garage. When noticing two ‘NEW’ signs that had been arranged behind Nathan's set of drums, it read MENEW. They made the name into an ambigram and began to play live locally.

=== Of the Future (2008–2010) ===
MENEW released their first EP, Of the Future in summer of 2008. Christian Mock was brought in to co-produce with MENEW and engineer the record, from a long-standing relationship that stemmed from early recordings and demos recorded together with producer Rick Parashar.

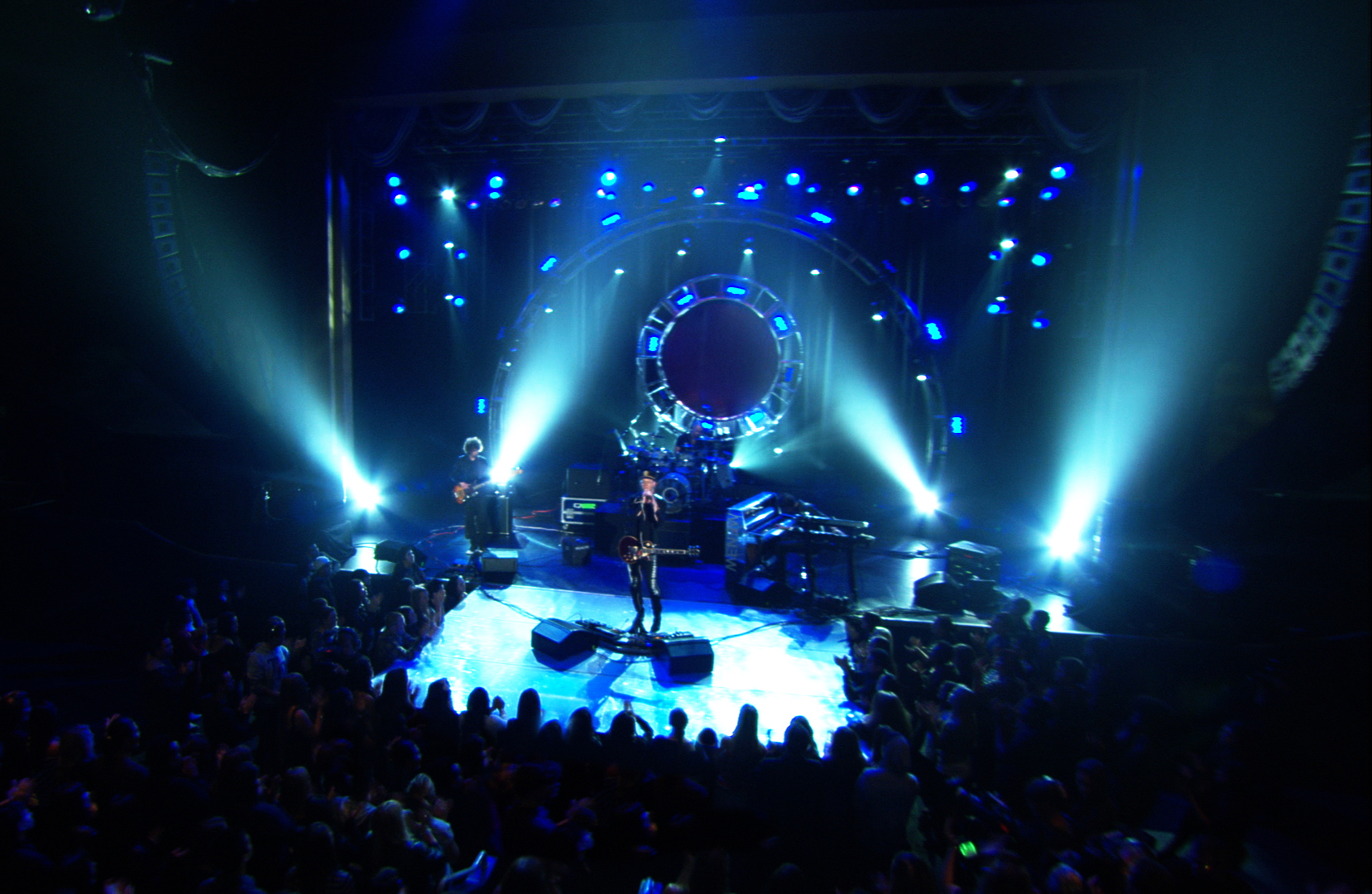
MENEW performing during their North American tour in 2010

The six song EP was released under the band's own independent record company RedCore Music Group. The first single from the EP, "This Isn’t Real", was released as a download in May 2008. It was later followed by the video release, directed by Lyle Christie. The second single, "The Future", was released September 2008, with another video directed by Lyle Christie. Later that year, a live performance of "The Future" at Tattoo Rock Parlour in Toronto was released for download only along with a video of the performance. The band were invited to perform "This Isn't Real" on the Late Show with David Letterman in January 2009, marking the band's network television premiere. MENEW toured in support of the release throughout North America during 2008–2010, including performances at NXNE and CMW.

=== Wide Awake Hello (2010–2011) ===
The recording sessions for the group's first official full-length album, Wide Awake Hello, began in August 2010. The band began writing and pre-production in their home studio Mission Control, outside of Toronto, before entering Dockside Studio in Louisiana, with Christian Mock. The title track of the album "Wide Awake" was recorded and added to the album Spring of 2011. It was the last track included before the official release and was recorded after the Dockside Studio sessions at Emac Studios in London, Ontario. The album Wide Awake Hello was released February 21, 2012, and mixed by Jack Joseph Puig. The first single "Don’t Give Up On Us Now" was featured in episodes of MTV’s Jersey Shore, The Hills and NBC’s Chuck. In February 2012, they released their second video, "Wide Awake", from the album Wide Awake Hello.

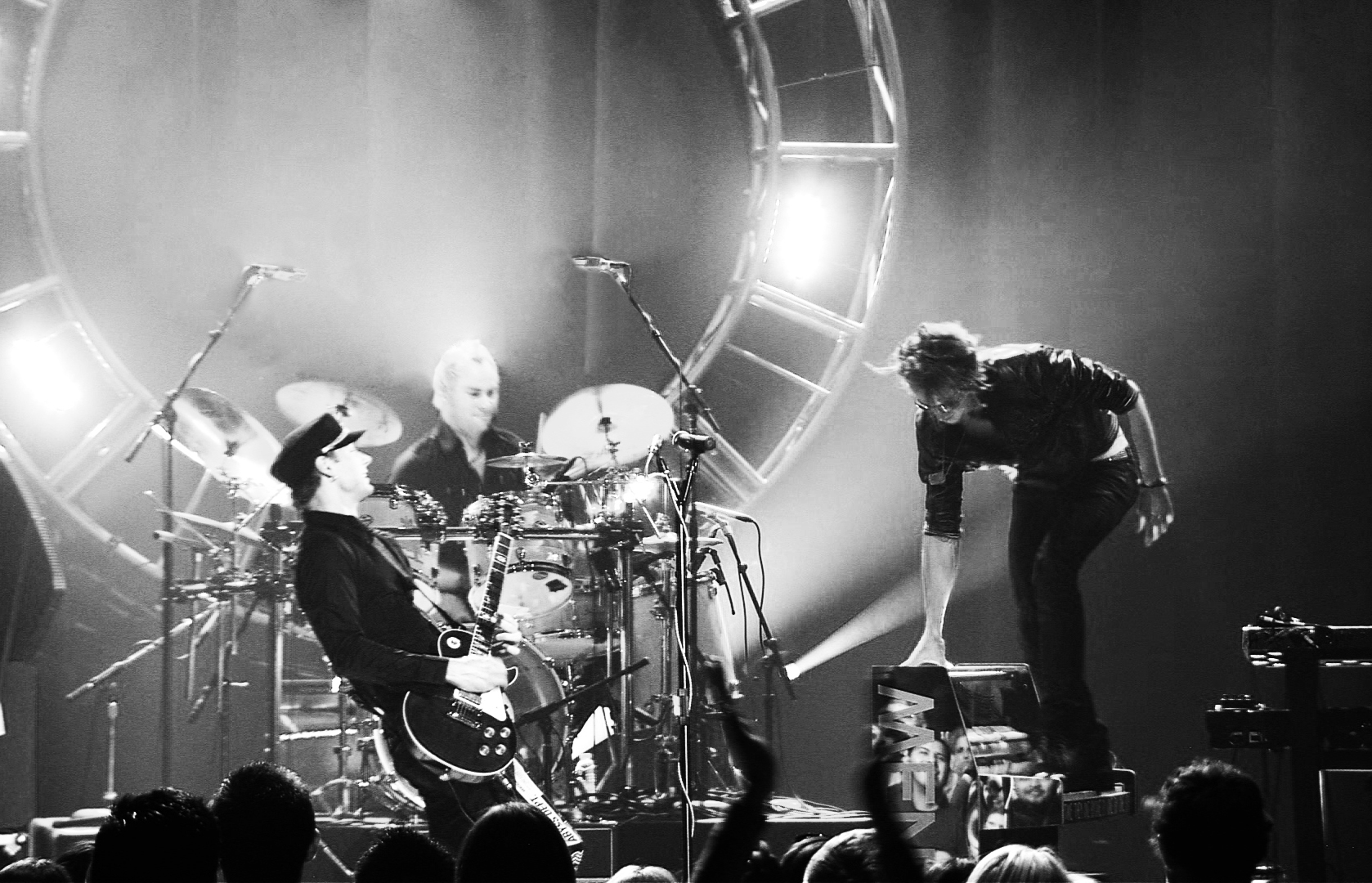
MENEW performing in Los Angeles during their 2012 tour

The third single "Never Let Go" released May 1, 2012. "The Neon Light / In Debt" video released September 10, 2012 as the fourth and final single / video from the Wide Awake Hello album. The band performed at NXNE in June 2011 and a slot for the Frank Zappa Fest / Manifesto, along with other bands such as Ween, in Baltimore in September 2011.

The band toured as support act for Filter and Fuel in 2012 and were described as "if Muse, Coldplay and The Killers had a genius, dirty lovechild – its name would be MENEW." In March 2012, the band played SXSW in Austin, Texas which coincided with several dates in Florida including performances on NBC Miami and Daytime NBC Tampa. The remainder of the year the band spent touring Nationally across the U.S. starting at New York City's Irving Plaza and ending at Roxy Theatre, Hollywood.

=== Mother Nature (2014) ===
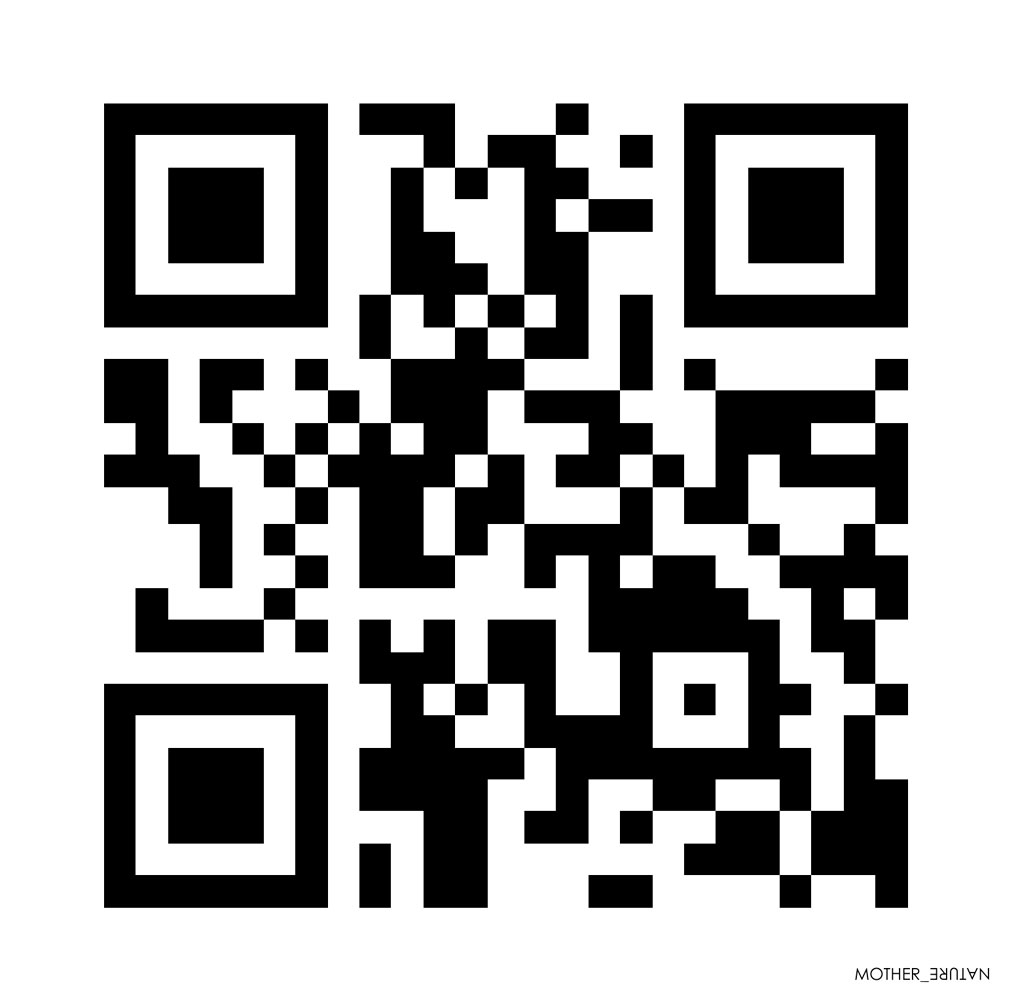
Mother Nature (physical album cover)

MENEW's second full-length album entitled Mother Nature was released April 8, 2014. The album was produced by Christian Mock and MENEW, mixed by Jack Joseph Puig. The album uses QR codes in place of the album artwork of the physical CD, and allows fans to view the changing artwork of Mother Nature online daily. The title track and lead-off single "Mother Nature" was released November 13, 2013. On June 10, 2014 the official video for "Drive" was released.

=== In Cali – Singles (2016) ===
In Cali comprises three singles; "Baby You're Like A Drug", "Lie To Each Other" and "Dangerous". All three were recorded at Sound City Studios complex in Los Angeles, California in August 2015, produced by Matt Wallace and mixed by Chris Lord-Alge at Mix LA in Los Angeles, California. The first single "Baby You're Like A Drug" released February 10, 2016. The official video for "Baby You're Like A Drug" coincided with the single release on February 10, 2016. The video stars actor Joshua Jackson and was directed by Joshua Butler and features a performance of the band on a mountain in Topanga, California.

== Philanthropy ==
MENEW have been supporters of Amnesty International since early on in their career, having Amnesty spokespersons spread awareness of human rights on several of their tours since 2010. They are also supporters of the environment. Their studio headquarters 'Mission Control' is solar powered. On September 4, 2014 the band performed a special benefit concert for Springs Preserve in Las Vegas at Red Rock as part of their Mother Nature Tour, to build culture, community and inspire environmental stewardship for the Nevada-based nature preserve. MENEW have also backed projects for the UN's World Food Programme and Cancer Research including a benefit concert in San Francisco, at the Mezzanine in 2012.

== Band members ==
- Shade – lead vocals, guitar
- Key – piano, synthesizers
- Nathan Samuel Phillip – drums, vocals, percussion

=== Touring ===
- Tyler "T-bone" Lawson – bass guitar (2007–2011)
- Jesse "Wilfur" Filice – bass guitar (2011–present)

== Discography ==
- Early Years-2007: Early Recordings / Demos
- 2008: Of the Future EP
- 2012: Wide Awake Hello
- 2014: Mother Nature
- 2016: In Cali Singles
