= Jellyfish (band) =

American rock band

- The Spilt Milk tour line-up of Jellyfish, 1993. From left: Andy Sturmer, Tim Smith, Roger Manning, and Eric Dover.

Background information
- Origin: San Francisco, California, U.S.
- Genres: Power pop; pop rock; psychedelic pop; indie rock; progressive
- Years active: 1989–1994
- Label: Charisma
- Past members: Andy Sturmer; Roger Manning; Jason Falkner; Chris Manning; Tim Smith; Eric Dover

Jellyfish were an American rock band that formed in San Francisco in 1989. Led by songwriters Andy Sturmer (drums, vocals) and Roger Manning (keyboards, vocals), the group was known for their blend of 1960s classic rock and XTC-style power pop. They released two albums, Bellybutton (1990) and Spilt Milk (1993), that proved influential to many subsequent acts in a similar vein.

Sturmer and Manning met in high school and shared an admiration for jazz, post-punk, and British pop music. Following a stint as members of Beatnik Beatch, they quit the group to continue songwriting with one another and formed Jellyfish, with Jason Falkner and Roger's brother Chris joining on guitar and bass respectively. After the tour for Bellybutton, Falkner and Chris Manning were replaced by Eric Dover on guitar and Tim Smith on bass. The group viewed Spilt Milk as their "masterpiece" and the fulfillment of their original grandiose vision for the band, emphasizing bombasticity, vocal harmonies, orchestration, and studio experimentation.

During their five-year existence, Jellyfish attracted critical acclaim and a devoted cult following, but struggled against prevailing rock trends (hair metal and grunge). Their only charting single on the Billboard Hot 100 was "Baby's Coming Back". Three other songs were top-twenty hits on Billboard's Modern Rock Tracks chart: "The King Is Half-Undressed", "That Is Why", and "The Ghost at Number One". Elsewhere, they had six songs appear on the UK Singles Chart, although none reached higher than the top thirty.

Jellyfish broke up in 1994 due to poor record sales, Sturmer's discomfort with his role as frontman, and artistic conflicts between the two songwriters. Manning subsequently formed Imperial Drag with Dover, and pursued careers as a solo artist and session musician. Sturmer worked with the Japanese pop duo Puffy AmiYumi and continues to compose music for animated television programs. From 2017 to 2022, the trio of Manning, Dover, and Smith recorded together as the Lickerish Quartet.

== Formation ==
While attending Amador Valley High School in Pleasanton, California in the early 1980s, Andy Sturmer and Roger Manning met and bonded over their love for jazz. Later in the decade, they joined Beatnik Beatch, a group fronted by Chris Ketner. Sturmer was the group's drummer, singer, and songwriter, while Manning was keyboardist. The duo soon began collaborating with one another, writing compositions that were stylistically different from the songs the band was producing at the time. As a side gig, the two also briefly wrote commercial jingles for companies such as Montana Hawk Shooting Range and Shutterbug Camera Store. In August 1989, a year after Atlantic Records released Beatnik Beatch's eponymous debut album, Manning and Sturmer left the group to continue songwriting with one another. At this juncture, they were still signed with Atlantic Records, but grew dissatisfied with the label's lack of interest for the new project. Virtually their only advocate at the label was A&R man John S. Carter, who was soon dismissed from the company.

Sturmer was the group's de facto leader and frontman. Although Sturmer and Manning were each credited for 50% of their writing collaborations, typically Sturmer's contributions were musical and lyrical, while Manning's were only musical. Manning commented: "Andy was perfectly capable of writing completed, finished great songs on his own. I could write lyrics, but it was a painstaking process." In Sturmer's summation: "It's not collaborative on every level. I write all the lyrics, but we write the music together. The way Roger and I write is that we embellish each other's ideas, like painting a picture. We grew up together and had a lot of the same records in our collection, so we don't have to explain our offbeat ideas to each other."

Jason Falkner was the lead guitarist for the Three O'Clock, a Los Angeles-based Paisley Underground band. He originally put a newspaper advertisement looking for "like-minded musicians" influenced by XTC, David Bowie, and the Blue Nile. Manning responded to Falkner's ad and the two met to collaborate. Nothing initially came out of the meeting. However, once Manning and Sturmer left Beatnik Beatch, Manning reconnected with Falkner to see if he was interested in joining the new group. Falkner was persuaded by the prospect of a major-label deal. He joined with the understanding – promised by Manning without consulting Sturmer – that he would be a contributing songwriter. Tensions arose immediately, as Sturmer was not ready to accommodate this arrangement, while Falkner struggled to connect with Sturmer on a personal level. Manning later called Falkner "the perfect part of the Jellyfish triangle during that period of our evolution".

The name "Jellyfish" came at the suggestion of an Atlantic executive, but was initially ignored by the group. Once they finished recording for their first album and had to pick a name for themselves, Sturmer decided to go with Jellyfish, for lack of any better alternative. According to journalist Paul Rees, the name was chosen to evoke the feeling of something graceful, yet amorphous and ephemeral.

== Bellybutton ==
We love pop music. It had a bad reputation, but we think it's time to make the world safe for pop music again.

— Andy Sturmer, June 1991

Jellyfish recorded their first album Bellybutton at Schnee Studios in Hollywood with producer Albhy Galuten, best known for his work with the Bee Gees on Saturday Night Fever, and engineer Jack Joseph Puig. Unusually, the band's demos were almost as fully realized as the studio recordings. Manning explained that the group took extra care in writing and arranging material due to the stresses of hourly studio costs, as they wanted to use the time to experiment musically, and because "Andy and I had to believe 100 per cent, 'Okay, this [song] is working. This is mostly going somewhere. We feel that this is now fleshed out enough that we’re confident to be in the studio environment.'" No synthesizers or sequencers were used on the recording. Redd Kross bassist Steve McDonald, who played on the album, said that Manning intended the record to sound "somewhere between Queen and Partridge Family".

Sessions lasted from September 1989 to March 1990 while the band were shopping around their demos to various labels and struggling to extricate themselves from Atlantic. Despite never playing live, they became subject to a bidding war among eight labels. Ultimately, they signed with Charisma Records, a newly-formed subsidiary of Virgin. Bellybutton was released on July 27, 1990 when the prevailing rock music trend was hair metal. Manning remembered that the band were "very aware" of that fact and believed that "in being true to ourselves, we couldn't have been more opposite to what was going on in music." The album peaked at number 124 on the Billboard 200 and was well received by contemporary music critics with singles "The King Is Half-Undressed" and "Baby's Coming Back" enjoying moderate radio play. However, album sales numbered at a then-underwhelming 100,000 units sold.

We don't fit anywhere, and we're up against a wall all the time. It would be very easy to slip into whatever the current fad is and cash in on that movement for as long as it lasts. Fortunately, we’re not associated with anything like that.

— Roger Manning, April 1993

Reviews for Bellybutton ranged from favorable to mixed, with most critics focusing on the group's resemblance to older acts. The band were sometimes dismissed as a revivalist nostalgia group, exacerbated by the flamboyant 1970s-era outfits they wore on stage and on promotional materials. They were also often tagged as alternative rock despite being out of step with any other act in the genre. Sturmer said that the group "never tried to suck up to any genre of music. We just did what came naturally to us and didn't worry about it." Falkner said that they "uniformly loathed the whole lumberjack rock star thing that was starting to happen [...] We didn't want to be an everyman band at all." He denied the assumption that the label forced the group into their Willy Wonka-style image: "There is no record company on the planet that would make people dress like that. That was all down to us." Later, the band toned down their image as they tired of critics writing about their clothes rather than the music.

Jellyfish recruited Roger's younger brother Chris on bass guitar and spent 12 weeks rehearsing for their 50-minute live show. From August 1990 to September 1991, they toured in support of Bellybutton, opening for the bands World Party and the Black Crowes. Their stage show featured an assortment of props, including a white picket fence, a bubble machine, Lite-Brite, and an eight-foot tall standee of Gavin MacLeod. They played the biggest show of their career in front of 72,000 people at Wembley Stadium, as the first of five bands opening for INXS. A considerable cult following began to form around Jellyfish, although the heavy touring schedule fatigued the group substantially. Tensions also worsened among the band members. Frustrated by having his songwriting contributions ignored by Manning and Sturmer, Falkner left the group after the tour. He later said: “I was told that Jellyfish would be an equal three-piece, with us writing and playing everything. That turned out to be a total joke. I felt like I was duped." Chris also quit the band to become a chef.

== Spilt Milk ==
As Jellyfish gathered prestige among industry insiders, many began soliciting the band for collaboration, including actress/singer Kim Basinger and Tears for Fears' Curt Smith. Following the Bellybutton tour, Sturmer and Manning worked with Ringo Starr for his 1992 solo album Time Takes Time. Five songs were written for Starr, but only one was used ("I Don't Believe You"). Sturmer and Manning also appeared in the music video for Starr's "Weight of the World". They were then invited to work with Brian Wilson of the Beach Boys. Wilson and Jellyfish had one songwriting session, but it was unproductive. One of the two songs they worked on, "Wish it Would Rain", later appeared on Manning's solo album Solid State Warrior (2005), albeit with Wilson's contributions omitted. The band also contributed the Mario-inspired song "Ignorance Is Bliss" to the 1991 compilation Nintendo: White Knuckle Scorin'. For the 1992 MTV Video Music Awards, Sturmer and Manning backed William Shatner as he sang the Best Song nominees.

[T]he band upped the ante considerably on 1993's Spilt Milk [...] there's no question that Sturmer and Manning sound like joyous kids left in a toy shop and making splendid use of every plaything at their disposal.

— AllMusic reviewer Chris Deming

After their sessions with Starr and Wilson, the band was dedicated to making their next album Spilt Milk "their masterpiece". Manning and Sturmer spent about eight hours a day, six days a week writing songs together at Sturmer's house in Cotati, CA between October 1991 and March 1992. Galuten and Puig returned as co-producers alongside Manning and Sturmer. Recorded from April to September 1992 on a budget of $300,000 (equivalent to $690,000 in 2025), the album's music was more aggressive, bombastic, and reliant on vocal harmonies and studio experimentation than Bellybutton. Manning reflected that Spilt Milk represented "the total vision we had for Jellyfish. The grandeur that was in our hearts from day one was finally realised with that album." Bassist Tim Smith was recruited for the sessions and upcoming tour. Also featured on the album were guitarists Tom "T-Bone" Wolk, Lyle Workman, and Jon Brion (the latter soon formed the Grays with Falkner).

Released on February 9, 1993, Spilt Milk peaked at number 164 in the US. Its poor sales were attributed to being released during the height of the popularity of grunge. Like Bellybutton, critics generally received the album favorably, but focused on its resemblance to artists of the 1970s, particularly the Raspberries. Detractors bemoaned the group for seemingly choosing Supertramp and Queen as influences. In the UK, the album performed better, reaching number 21. Its fans included Queen's Brian May, who praised the album in a contemporary interview. In late 1993, Jellyfish toured as the opening act for Tears for Fears. This tour included guitarist Eric Dover, who Sturmer said was "not really a full-fledged member [of the group]", with stops in Australia, Europe and Japan (the latter's dates were completely sold out). Jellyfish played their last show on November 20, 1993 at the Broward County Fair in Hallandale Beach, Florida.

In 1994, Jellyfish contributed a cover of Harry Nilsson's "Think About Your Troubles" to the tribute album For the Love of Harry: Everybody Sings Nilsson (1995). Their contribution was a personal request from Nilsson, who was a fan of the group. According to Manning, Nilsson met the band at a concert in Los Angeles, and "we all agreed that we should hook up and do some writing soon. Six weeks later he passed away." The cover was the last song Sturmer and Manning recorded together.

== Breakup ==
During the tour for Spilt Milk, Sturmer and Manning grew increasingly distant as friends. On their return home, the two songwriters independently wrote material for a third album, provisionally titled Nausea Trois. By then, they were drifting apart musically. Manning remembered that, prior, they would bond over albums such as Paul McCartney's Ram or the Zombies' Odessey and Oracle; however, "it was clear that none of that was happening anymore." He said that he was "rediscovering my love of [...] high-energy, fun melodic pop with attitude. And Andy was Leonard Cohen. That was it." When Sturmer presented him a country ballad song, he accordingly "left in tears because I had zero interest in recording it." Sturmer felt that Manning had outgrown the partnership, and for his part, was fearful that Manning's new songs would likely inspire journalists to persistently compare the band to Alice Cooper.

Another reason the band broke up, in Manning's words, was Sturmer's discomfort with being "in the spotlight". Sturmer resented his role as leader and frontman, especially when it came to business matters, and his wish for Manning to take more initiative in the band's leadership had become a source of rancor. However, Sturmer rejected the idea of Tim Smith contributing as a third songwriter, as Smith recalled, "I think that was enough for Roger, partially, among other things, to shut it all down at that point anyway. [...] I felt like I was the one that kind of tried to at least keep the band together in some way, and after that response, it was like, 'Whatever, if it happens it happens, I've done all that I can do here.'" Financial pressures also loomed over the band.

On April 4, Manning phoned Sturmer and said "I think we're done", to which Sturmer responded: "I've been thinking the same thing." One month later, the San Francisco Chronicle reported that the group had disintegrated due to "creative differences". In a June Denver Post article, Falkner responded to the news: "It's ironic. Let's just say that I didn't have a moment of silence when I heard about it."

== Aftermath ==
=== 1994–2000s ===
Soon after Jellyfish broke up, Manning formed the Moog Cookbook and Imperial Drag, the latter group with Eric Dover. He has also released a few solo records and worked as a session musician. Some of his songs proposed for the potential third Jellyfish album were reworked for his solo records, but none made it into Imperial Drag. Tim Smith formed Umajets and recorded the album Demolotion with help from Manning and Dover. It was released in late 1995 to little critical notice.

Sturmer retreated from the public eye, but continued working as a songwriter for cartoons such as Hi Hi Puffy AmiYumi, Teen Titans, and Ben 10. In 2004, Falkner unexpectedly reconnected with Sturmer at a Los Angeles studio: "He said he'd had a premonition that he was going to see me that day. Then he told me he was sorry for never having given me a chance. I was floored. We exchanged phone numbers, but neither of us has ever used them."

Fan Club, a four-CD box set, was released in 2002 by power pop label Not Lame Recordings. The set consists of demos, rarities, interview excerpts, and live performances. By the end of the year, the label had sold out three pressings of the set (8,000 copies). The set went out of print within months due to the expiration of the label's rights to the Jellyfish catalog, making it a collector's item.

In 2004 or 2005, Coachella organizers invited Manning to reunite Jellyfish for a one-off performance at the festival. Manning advised the organizers to consult Sturmer first. Sturmer, through his lawyer, responded he would not accept the offer regardless of any amount of money involved. In a 2008 interview, Manning stated: "Except for Andy, we all speak to one another. [...] nobody is interested in working with Andy in a personal or creative capacity. It would serve no purpose, but I don’t say that with any animosity or sadness."

Manning and Falkner reteamed for the albums Logan's Sanctuary (2000) and TV Eyes (2006), but neither were commercially successful. On July 25, 2008, Falkner joined Manning onstage for a performance of "That Is Why" at the Fuji Rock Festival in Japan. In January 2010, they performed a few shows as the opening act for Cheap Trick, playing solo and Jellyfish songs, and as members of Cheap Trick's supporting band.

=== 2010s–present ===
In 2011, Manning reached out to Sturmer via e-mail. Manning later commented: "[I] felt it was long overdue. In doing some personal growth, I felt I had some amends to make with him that were going to be healing for myself and for both of us, ideally. I'm very happy I did that, and I think Andy was happy as well. He didn’t talk much about it afterwards. Just said, 'Thank you very much for this.'"

In January 2012, Omnivore Recordings reissued Bellybutton and Spilt Milk on limited-edition colored vinyl; the pressings sold out within days. In June, they followed with Live At Bogart's, a complete 1991 performance that originally aired on Westwood One, then the Record Store Day release Stack-a-Tracks, containing the backing tracks of Bellybutton and Spilt Milk. In 2013, Omnivore issued Radio Jellyfish, a collection of 1993 radio performances in which the band played acoustically. In 2015, the label reissued expanded editions of Bellybutton and Spilt Milk that included many of the tracks previously released on Fan Club.

In 2016, Not Lame Media published the band's first biography, Brighter Day: A Jellyfish Story, written by Craig Dorfman. Reviewing the book for PopMatters, Eric Rovie wrote that it was a "balanced" and "well-researched" work that presents the principal members "in conflicting but complementary lights: brilliant, driven, and talented on the one hand, but also selfish, overly-introspective, and obnoxiously perfectionist in others. The music speaks for itself."

According to a journalist in 2015, Sturmer refuses interviews about his past or current work. However, Sturmer participated in interviews for Brighter Day. In a 2014 interview, Manning said that he had not talked to Sturmer in two decades, and ruled out the idea that he would ever write songs with him again. In 2015, he said that they did communicate, but only regarding business matters. Asked about the prospect of a reunion, he said he was uncertain of the possibility and explained: "In general, I think it is lack of enough interest on Andy’s part. I know many people that work with him in film and TV always tell me how happy and successful he is. Last I heard he had four or five shows on Disney that he was scoring."

In 2017, Manning, Smith, and Dover reunited for a new band called the Lickerish Quartet. The musicians had not played together since 1994 and released three EPs from early 2020 to 2022. Sturmer was not offered to participate in the project. In a 2020 interview, Manning commented that Sturmer remains uninterested "in any kind of post-Jellyfish activity, and that’s fine."

== Influences ==
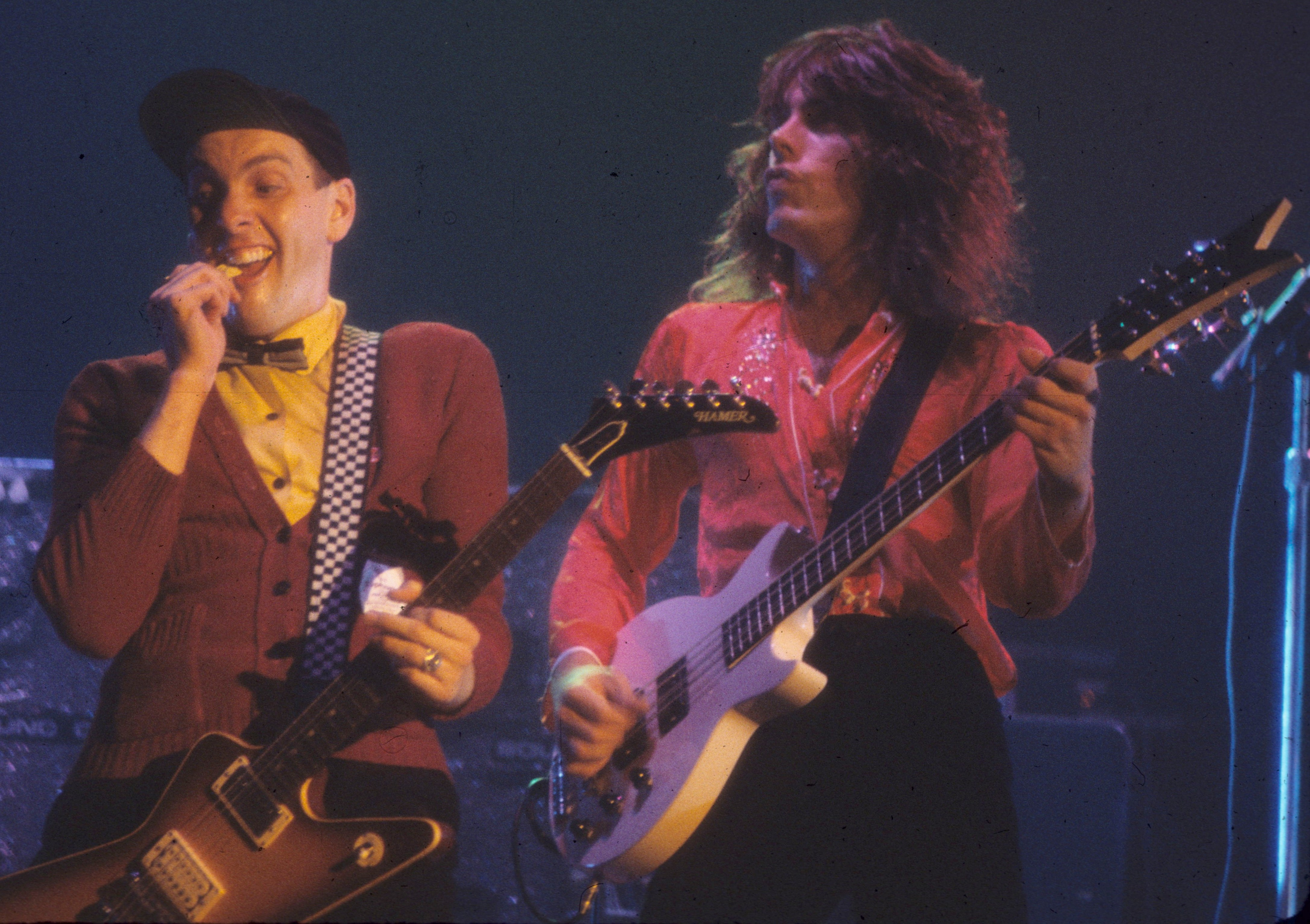
Among power pop bands of the 1990s, Jellyfish were distinguished for being influenced more by Cheap Trick (pictured in 1977)

Jellyfish distinguished themselves from their peers by incorporating a wider variety of sounds and musical styles. Most of their influences were British. Sturmer and Manning shared an admiration for punk, progressive rock, reggae, fusion and for artists that included the Beatles, the Beach Boys, Harry Nilsson, Talking Heads, Cheap Trick, Peter Gabriel, Queen, and the Damned, in addition to jazz musicians such as Art Blakey, John Coltrane, the Jazz Messengers, Miles Davis, Elvin Jones, and Bill Evans. In a 1991 article about the Beatles' influence on new power pop bands, Sturmer commented: "I was much more influenced by ELO and Cheap Trick. After a while I heard a Beatles album and thought, 'Wow, what's up here with these guys?' I kinda went about it backwards." Falkner's inspirations overlapped with his bandmates and included The Fall, Magazine, The Monochrome Set, Yes, and UK. He was originally contacted by Manning specifically because he listed XTC as an influence in his newspaper ad.

Asked about Jellyfish's musical influences, Manning answered: "Britpop and post-punk was happening at the time. My jazz schooling helped me analyze the vocal harmonies and arrangements of The Carpenters and Fleetwood Mac and Burt Bacharach. I then applied that to what we were doing in Jellyfish." He stated that, even though their music was not often associated with jazz, their shared enthusiasm for the genre was significant, as "it opens your ear to so many different kinds of harmony and so many arrangers and composers. Anybody who's just well-rounded and studied has had a jazz background, just as they've studied the great classical composers" However, he noted, "Andy was a mad [Bob] Dylan and Van Morrison fan, and while I have respect for those artists, the songwriting didn’t speak to me." Manning's original concept for the group was akin to the early multimedia crossovers of bands that turned into TV shows or vice versa: the Monkees, the Archies, the Partridge Family, and the Banana Splits.

In response to the band frequently being compared to past acts, Sturmer said: "There are certainly bits of what we do that people could go, 'This sounds to me like that,' but I think that's just a bit of a wank, frankly. [...] I think when things are referenced to death, it's like trying to describe the color blue to a blind person." Washington Post contributor Eric Bruce opined in 1990: "It's impossible not to hear Beatles and Beach Boys, especially, in the band's music, with nods to Supertramp, Cheap Trick, Gilbert O'Sullivan, 10cc, the Hollies, the Monkees, the Raspberries, Crowded House -- heck, just about every pop purveyor of above-average intelligence in the past 25 years". Similarly, Andy Edelstein of Newsday felt that their "greatest influence seems to be the '70s groups who themselves were derivative of the mid-'60s British Invasion bands".

== Legacy ==
[They] either arrived a decade-and-a-half too late or were so far ahead of their time that they're still waiting for the rest of the world to catch up. More than 20 years after their split, Jellyfish practically define the notion of the cult band. To the small but ardent following they attracted, they remain lost geniuses whose promise remains unfulfilled.

— Critic Dave Everley, 2015

Nielsen SoundScan listed the combined US sales of Spilt Milk and Bellybutton with 269,000 copies sold, although the number was likely higher, as Soundscan was launched a year after the release of Bellybutton. Music journalists generally praised Jellyfish at the time, albeit a recurring criticism was that the band's music appeared too derivative. Later, journalists often used the group as a point of comparison to subsequent artists.

Since the breakup, the group has influenced numerous other acts, especially within the power pop genre. Their following also grew significantly. AllMusic's James Christopher Morgan wrote that their influence extends to the Merrymakers, the Hutchinsons, the Excentrics, and Ben Folds Five, and added that the band "secure[d] for themselves the same kind of cult status bestowed upon so many of their heroes." Writing for Louder Sound in 2015, Dave Everley attributed Jellyfish to have "bridged the world of power-pop and progressive rock like no one before or since".

== Members ==
- Andy Sturmer – vocals, drums, keyboards, guitar (1989–1994)
- Roger Manning – keyboards, piano, guitar, percussion, vocals (1989–1994)
- Jason Falkner – guitars, bass, keyboards, backing vocals (1989–1991)
- Chris Manning – bass, backing vocals (1990–1991)
- Eric Dover – guitar, banjo, keyboards, backing vocals (1993–1994)
- Tim Smith – bass, backing vocals (1992–1994)

Timeline

== Discography ==
Jellyfish discography
- Studio albums: 2
- EPs: 3
- Compilation albums: 4
- Singles: 10
- Live albums: 2

=== Albums ===
Studio albums

Title	Album details	Peak chart positions	
Title	Album details	US	UK
Bellybutton	Released: July 27, 1990; Label: Charisma	124	—
Spilt Milk	Released: February 9, 1993; Label: Charisma	164	21
"—" denotes album that did not chart

Live albums

Title	Album details
Live At Bogart's	Released: 2012; Label: Omnivore
Radio Jellyfish	Released: 2013; Label: Omnivore

EPs

Title	Album details
Jellyfish Comes Alive (US promo)	Released: 1991; Label: Charisma
The Scary-Go-Round EP featuring Now She Knows He's Wrong (UK-exclusive)	Released: 1991
New Mistake EP (Japan-exclusive)	Released: 1993

Compilations

Title	Album details
The Greatest (Japan-exclusive)	Released: 1998
Fan Club (box set of demos, rarities and live performances)	Released: August 2002; Label: Not Lame
Best!	Released: May 6, 2006; Label: Virgin
Stack-a-Tracks (backing tracks from Bellybutton and Spilt Milk)	Released: 2012; Label: Omnivore

=== Singles ===
Year	Song	Peak chart positions			Album
Year	Song	US	US Alt	UK	Album
1990	"The King Is Half-Undressed"	—	19	39	Bellybutton
1990	"That Is Why"	—	11	—	Bellybutton
1991	"Baby's Coming Back"	62	—	51	Bellybutton
1991	"Now She Knows She's Wrong"	—	—	49	Bellybutton
1991	"I Wanna Stay Home"	—	—	59	Bellybutton
1991	"Ignorance is Bliss"	—	—	—	Nintendo: White Knuckle Scorin'
1993	"The Ghost at Number One"	—	9	43	Spilt Milk
1993	"New Mistake"	—	—	55	Spilt Milk
1993	"Joining a Fan Club"	—	—	—	Spilt Milk
1993	"Bye, Bye, Bye"	—	—	—	Spilt Milk
"—" denotes releases that did not chart or were not released in that region.
