= The King Is Half-Undressed =

Single by Jellyfish

from the album Bellybutton
- B-side: "Calling Sarah"
- Released: 1990
- Recorded: Various: Bill Schnee Studios; (Los Angeles, CA); Ocean Way Recording; (Hollywood, CA); Studio 55; (Los Angeles, CA)
- Genre: Progressive pop; power pop; alternative rock
- Length: 3:48
- Label: Charisma
- Songwriters: Roger Manning; Andy Sturmer
- Producers: Albhy Galuten; Jack Joseph Puig

Jellyfish singles chronology
"The King Is Half-Undressed" (1990)	"That Is Why" (1990)

"The King Is Half-Undressed" is a song by the American power pop group Jellyfish. It is the first single released in support of their 1990 debut album Bellybutton.

== Formats and track listing ==
All songs written by Roger Manning and Andy Sturmer.

European 7" single (CUSS 1)

1. "The King Is Half-Undressed" – 3:48
2. "Calling Sarah" – 4:03

European CD single (CUSCD1)

1. "The King Is Half-Undressed" – 3:48
2. "Calling Sarah" – 4:03
3. "The Man I Used to Be" – 4:34

== Charts ==
Chart (1990–1991)	Peak position
Australia (ARIA)	111
US Alternative Airplay (Billboard)	19
UK Singles (OCC)	39
UK Airplay (Music Week)	47
