= Demos (Imperial Drag album) =

Compilation album by Imperial Drag
- Released: May 2, 2005
- Genre: Rock, glam rock, progressive rock
- Length: 160:58

Imperial Drag chronology
Imperial Drag (1996)	Demos (2005)

Demos is a compilation of demos and non-album tracks by Imperial Drag, released on May 2, 2005. Five additional tracks were subsequently made available exclusively through the Not Lame Recordings website.

The album was distributed through the (now defunct) Weedshare music distribution service.

== Track listing ==
Demos (CD1)
No.	Title	Length
1.	"She Cries All Night"	3:31
2.	"Smellin' Like a Rose"	4:06
3.	"Mother Nature"	2:53
4.	"Boy or a Girl (Demo)"	4:20
5.	""Breakfast" by Tiger (Demo)"	4:38
6.	"Turpentine & Honey (Demo)"	5:12
7.	"Gypsy Sister (Demo)"	3:49
8.	"There You Go Again (Demo)"	4:41
9.	"Sweet Sweet Love (Demo)"	2:51
10.	"Could've Been You"	4:00
11.	"Scaredy Cats & Egomaniacs (Demo)"	4:11
12.	"I Won't Pay to Buy It"	3:54
13.	"Countless Poets"	4:17
14.	"Look Back over My Shoulder"	4:09
15.	"Hey Honey Please"	5:02
16.	"Please Leave Me Home for X-Mas"	3:27
17.	"Lovin' from the Oven"	3:50
Total length:		68:51

Demos (CD2)
No.	Title	Length
1.	"Do You Spy"	4:12
2.	"Strange"	4:11
3.	"I Don't Feel a Thing"	2:35
4.	"Private Hell (Demo)"	2:12
5.	"Morning Star (Demo)"	4:54
6.	"What Makes You Think (Demo)"	3:22
7.	"Slowdown"	4:06
8.	"Not Enough (Demo)"	3:44
9.	"Why Can't I Be Someone Else (Demo)"	3:14
10.	"Playboy After Dark (Demo)"	3:05
11.	"Crosseyed (Demo)"	3:38
12.	"Down with the Man (Demo)"	2:29
13.	"The Man in the Moon (Demo)"	4:14
14.	"Zodiac Sign (Demo)"	3:25
15.	"The Salvation Army Band (Demo)"	4:22
16.	"Stare into the Sun (Demo)"	4:23
17.	"Illuminate (Demo)"	4:23
18.	"Working Class High (Demo)"	3:18
19.	"Overnight Sensation (Demo)"	6:13
Total length:		72:02

Not Lame Exclusive Tracks
No.	Title	Length
1.	"A Bruise Is Still a Bruise (Demo)"	5:18
2.	"Dandylion (Demo)"	2:49
3.	"Half Off Sale (Demo)"	2:33
4.	"Spyder (Demo)"	4:56
5.	"Suzy Suicide (Demo)"	4:29
Total length:		20:05
