= On the Way (Abra Moore album) =

Studio album by Abra Moore
- Released: June 12, 2007
- Studio: The Institute; Tree Fort Studios, Austin, Texas, US
- Length: 46:26
- Language: English
- Label: Sarathan Records
- Producer: Mitch Watkins

Abra Moore chronology
Everything Changed (2004)	On the Way (2007)

"Yes, my father died. I went through transition, but [associates from home state Hawaii] just painted it as this morose drama. And everyone in Hawaii was calling: 'Are you OK?' It's a chapter of my life; that's how I make records. That's where I was then; I'm over here now."

—Abra Moore on the death of her father and processing her emotions on On the Way

On the Way is a 2007 studio album by American singer-songwriter Abra Moore. It has received positive reviews by critics.

== Reception ==
Editors at AllMusic rated this album 3.5 out of 5 stars, with critic Ronnie D. Lankford, Jr. writing that "there is great deal to like about On the Way", including "the mix of keyboards, pianos, guitars, and percussion fittingly underline Moore's confectionary vocal style, injecting the material with an easygoing pop feel" but ends with the criticism that "On the Way never quite recaptures the magic of its opening moments, leaving the listener enchanted but wanting more". In The Austin Chronicle, Melanie Haupt stated that this album shows Moore's lack of fear in the face of loss of love and death of family members. A review in No Depression ended: "An expressive singer, Moore captures the mood of a song, be it the pensiveness of Tom Freund’s “No Turning Back” (the album’s sole cover) or the wistfulness in the ethereal “You”. Moore’s sole drawback is an occasional tendency to let a song go on too long (as on “Take Care Of Me” and “Birthday Song”), but it’s not a fatal flaw." In Paste, David Mead wrote that "while Abra Moore’s On The Way is, on one level, a pleasingly competent collection of mature observations about relationships, this description fails to do justice to the soul at its loamy core—the source of the faerie/banshee wails and moans that unexpectedly rise out of her like steam from a geyser".

== Track listing ==
All songs written by Abra Moore, except where noted.

1. "Into the Sunset" – 4:35
2. "After All These Years" – 3:52
3. "Sugarite" – 4:14
4. "On the Way" – 4:34
5. "Sorry" – 5:21
6. "I Believe" – 3:09
7. "Take Care of Me" – 4:52
8. "No Turning Back" (Tom Freund) – 4:52
9. "You" – 4:14
10. "Birthday Song" – 5:08
11. "On the Way (Coda)" – 1:34

== Personnel ==
- Abra Moore – acoustic guitar, piano, vocals
- Gina R. Binkley – design
- Gene Elders – violin
- John Fremgen – acoustic bass
- Jeff Hellmer – piano, electric piano
- Jonathan Kochmer – arrangement
- John Leon – pedal steel guitar
- Pat Mastelotto – drums, percussion
- Ephram Owens – Flugelhorn
- Pipa
- Scout
- Will Sexton – vocals
- Jack Spencer – photography
- Jim Vollentine – audio engineering, mixing, audio mastering
- Mitch Watkins – bass guitar, guitar, keyboard bass, keyboards, electric sitar, engineering, production

== See also ==
- List of 2007 albums
