= That Is Why =

Single by Jellyfish

from the album Bellybutton
- B-side: "Calling Sarah"
- Released: 1990
- Recorded: Various: Bill Schnee Studios; (Los Angeles, CA); Ocean Way Recording; (Hollywood, CA); Studio 55; (Los Angeles, CA)
- Genre: Power pop; indie rock
- Length: 4:16 (album version); 3:43 (radio edit)
- Label: Charisma
- Songwriter(s): Roger Manning; Andy Sturmer
- Producer(s): Albhy Galuten; Jack Joseph Puig

Jellyfish singles chronology
"The King Is Half-Undressed" (1990)	"That Is Why" (1990)	"Baby's Coming Back" (1990)

"That Is Why" is a song by the American power pop group Jellyfish. It is the second single released in support of their 1990 debut album Bellybutton.

== Formats and track listing ==
All songs written by Roger Manning and Andy Sturmer

European 7" single (114 091)

1. "That Is Why" (edit) – 3:43
2. "Calling Sarah" – 4:03

US promotional CD single (PRCD 019)

1. "That Is Why" (edit) – 3:43
2. "Calling Sarah" – 4:03
3. "The Man I Used to Be" – 4:34

== Charts ==
Chart (1991)	Peak position
US Alternative Airplay (Billboard)	11
