= Strangest Places =

Studio album by Abra Moore
- Released: May 20, 1997
- Genre: Folk rock
- Length: 48:59
- Label: Arista
- Producer: Mitch Watkins

Abra Moore chronology
Sing (1995)	Strangest Places (1997)	Everything Changed (2004)

Professional ratings
Review scores
Source	Rating
AllMusic	4/5 stars
The Austin Chronicle	3.5/4 stars
No Depression	Favorable

Strangest Places is the second album by the singer-songwriter Abra Moore, released in 1997 by Arista Records. Moore was nominated for a Grammy Award for the single, "Four Leaf Clover".

== Track listing ==
All songs written by Abra Moore, except as noted.

1. "Four Leaf Clover" – 3:32
2. "Don't Feel Like Cryin'" – 3:51
3. "Strangest Places" (Moore, Mitch Watkins) – 4:01
4. "Happiness" – 4:27
5. "Never Believe You Now" – 4:19
6. "Say It Like That" – 4:17
7. "Your Faithful Friend" – 3:07
8. "All I Want" – 3:52
9. "In Light of It All" – 3:50
10. "Keeps My Body Warm" – 4:06
11. "Guitar Song" – 5:00
12. "Summer's Ending" – 4:37

== Personnel ==
- Abra Moore – guitar, assistant engineering, tambourine, vocals
- J. P. Allen – harmonica
- Padraic Aubrey – mixing assistance
- Jim Champagne – mixing assistance
- Stewart Cochran – Hammond organ
- Gene Elders – violin
- Maude Gilman – art direction, art design
- Wade Hunt – design
- Dennis Keeley – photography
- Jimmy LaFave – backing vocals
- Brian Lee – mastering
- Bob Ludwig – mastering
- Lloyd Maines – steel guitar, slide guitar
- Chris Maresh – bass guitar
- Mike McCarthy – engineering
- John Mills – clarinet, baritone saxophone
- Jack Joseph Puig – mixing
- Steve Schnur – A&R
- Chris Searles – drums, percussion
- Stuart Sullivan – engineering
- Brannen Temple – drums
- John Treanor – washboard
- Mitch Watkins – bass guitar, cabasa, drum loop, engineering, acoustic and electric guitar, keyboards, production, programming, shaker
