= Eric Dover =

American musician (born 1967)

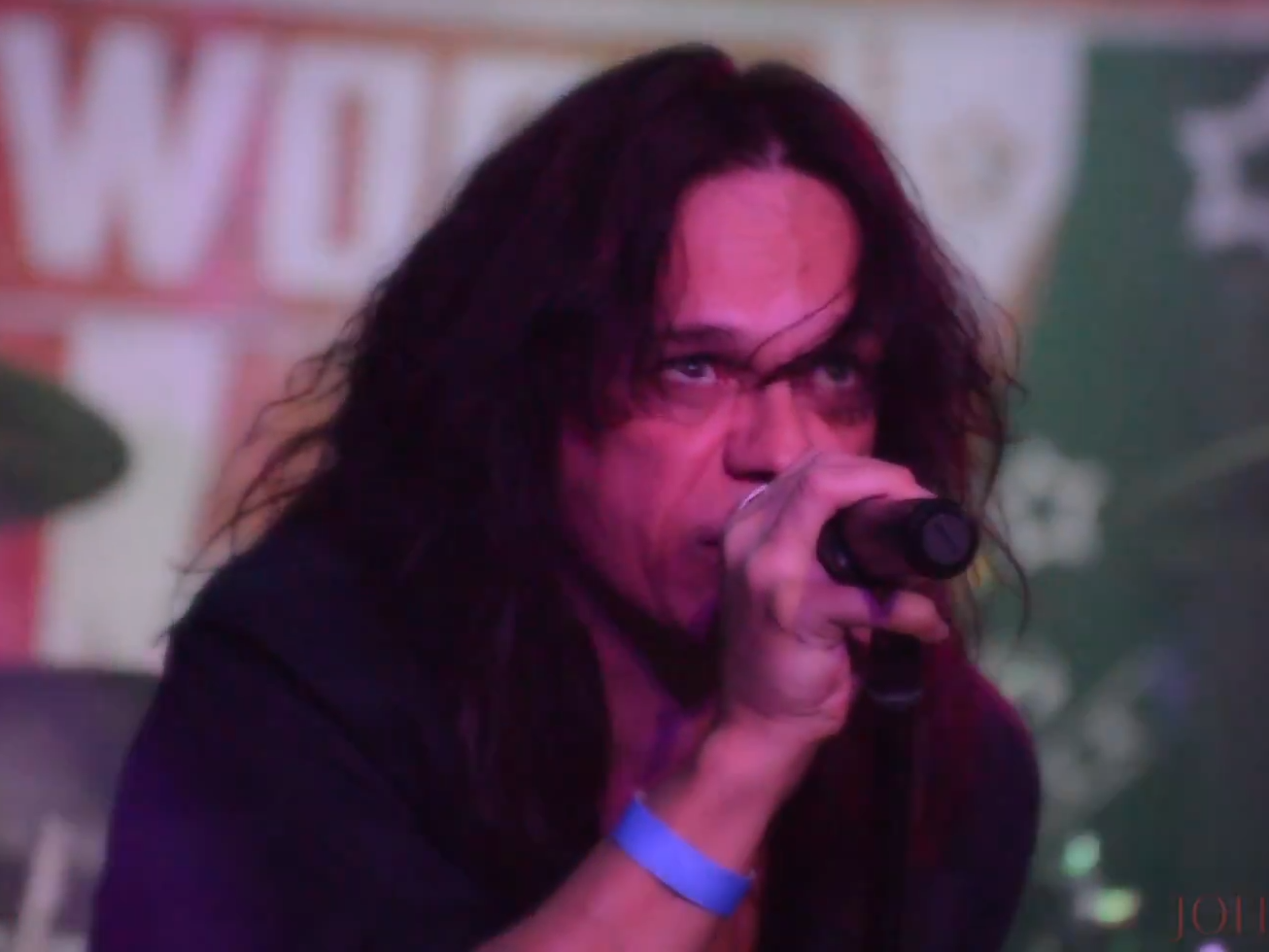
- Dover in 2018

Background information
- Born: January 19, 1967 (age 59); Jasper, Alabama, U.S.
- Genres: Pop rock, hard rock
- Occupations: Musician, songwriter
- Instruments: Guitar, vocals, banjo, keyboards
- Years active: 1993–present
- Labels: Geffen, Work, Eagle, Dramapants
- Website: ericdover.com

Eric Dover (born January 19, 1967) is an American guitarist and singer, most notably with Jellyfish, Slash's Snakepit, Imperial Drag, and Alice Cooper.

== Biography ==
Dover began playing guitar when he was 11 years old. He started playing around town wherever he could. He shared the stage with Kim Boyce and was in the group The Extras with drummer Scott Collier in the mid-1980s. The core of that band split off to form the outfit Love Bang in 1991 with Dover, Chris Baker, Tony Brock, Collier, and Eddie Usher. They were signed to a development deal by Ardent Studios in Memphis and recorded for them for the next two years. Love Bang's album, The Rule of 72's, was released March 26, 2009; Baker and Brock later completed and remastered the shelved recordings, and the album is available on iTunes and Spotify.

In 1993 he joined Jellyfish on tour after the release of Spilt Milk. The group disbanded in 1994 and Dover joined bandmate Roger Manning in the group Doverman. Dover and Manning have cameos as part of Davy Jones' band in the 1995 The Brady Bunch Movie.

Before Doverman went into the studio, Dover auditioned as lead vocalist for the first solo album by Slash of Guns N' Roses. Dover recorded vocals on the Slash's Snakepit album It's Five O'Clock Somewhere before rejoining Manning in the renamed Imperial Drag.

After Imperial Drag broke up in 1997, Dover appeared on several albums as a session musician before joining Alice Cooper's band for the Brutal Planet tour in 2001. He played on 2001's Dragontown and is co-credited with Alice Cooper and fellow guitarist Ryan Roxie on most of the tracks of the 2003 album The Eyes of Alice Cooper. He left the band following the tour for The Eyes of Alice Cooper. Fellow Birminghamian Damon Johnson won the audition to replace him. Dover went on to frequently appear with other members of Cooper's band as Glamnation.

Currently, Dover fronts a group named Sextus and has adopted a moniker of the same name. The debut album Stranger Than Fiction was released by Sextus on March 18, 2008, on Dramapants Records. The second record Devil Angel was released in October 2010. The lineup of Sextus is made of Eric Dover (vocals and guitar), Chris Declercq (guitar), Joe Karnes (bass), Eric "Icky" Skodis (drums), Mitchell Sigman (keyboards) and Ron Dziubla (saxophone).

Since 2017, Dover is also a member of the rock outfit The Lickerish Quartet, alongside other former Jellyfish members multi-instrumentalist Roger Joseph Manning Jr. and bassist Tim Smith. They released their first EP, Threesome Volume 1, in May 2020, and their second, Threesome Volume 2, in late November 2020.
