= Beatnik Beatch =

American rock band

- Origin: San Francisco, California, U.S.
- Genres: Pop rock
- Years active: 1980s–1989
- Labels: Atlantic
- Past members: Chris Witt Ketner; Andy Sturmer; George Cole; Se Padilla; Roger Manning

Beatnik Beatch were an American pop rock band formed in San Francisco in the 1980s. They consisted of Chris Witt Ketner (bass, vocals, viola), Andy Sturmer (drums, vocals), and George Cole (guitar). They also featured keyboardist Se Padilla, later replaced by Roger Manning.

In 1987, they released At The Zula Pool, under the San Francisco based indie label Industrial Records. It was re-released with 5 tracks removed and 4 tracks added after the band was signed by Atlantic Records in 1988. Around this time Manning joined the band.

After Beatnik Beatch disbanded early in 1989, Sturmer and Manning formed Jellyfish.

== Discography ==
Albums

- At the Zula Pool - (Industrial) 1987
- Beatnik Beatch - (Atlantic) 1988

Single

- "Beatnik Beatch" - 1988
