= Imperial Drag =

American rock band

- Genres: Glam rock
- Years active: 1994–1997
- Label: The Work Group
- Past members: Roger Joseph Manning Jr.; Eric Dover; Joseph Karnes; Eric Skodis

Imperial Drag was an American rock band active from 1994 to 1997. The group, formed after the breakup of Jellyfish, released one album and scored one hit single in the U.S. before disbanding.

== History ==
Imperial Drag formed in 1994 after keyboardist Roger Joseph Manning Jr.'s previous group, Jellyfish, broke up. Joining with Jellyfish live band member Eric Dover, bassist Joseph Karnes, and drummer Eric Skodis, the group released a self-titled effort in 1996 on The Work Group. They charted a hit on the U.S. Billboard Modern Rock chart with the single "Boy or a Girl", which peaked at #30 that year. The group's glam rock-influenced image, however, failed to win fans over in the wake of the grunge era. The group's album received a poor review from Rolling Stone and did not sell well, and they disbanded in 1997. Manning moved on to a solo career in the 2000s.

== Members ==
- Eric Dover – vocals, guitar
- Roger Joseph Manning Jr. – keyboards, piano, vocals
- Joseph Karnes – bass, vocals
- Eric Skodis – drums, vocals

== Discography ==
- Imperial Drag (The Work Group, 1996)
- "Boy or a Girl" (single) (Columbia Records, 1996) #30 Modern Rock Tracks, #54 UK
- Demos (2005)
