= Spilt Milk (Jellyfish album) =

Studio album by Jellyfish
- Released: February 9, 1993
- Recorded: April – September 1992
- Studios: Various studios in Los Angeles, California
- Genres: Rock; power pop
- Length: 46:13
- Label: Charisma
- Producers: Albhy Galuten; Jack Joseph Puig; Andy Sturmer; Roger Manning

Jellyfish chronology
Jellyfish Comes Alive (1991)	Spilt Milk (1993)	Fan Club (2002)

Singles from Spilt Milk
- 1. "The Ghost at Number One" Released: 1993; 2. "New Mistake" Released: July 5, 1993

Spilt Milk is the second and final studio album by American rock band Jellyfish, released on February 9, 1993, by Charisma Records. It features a harsher and more ornate sound than their previous, Bellybutton (1990). As with Bellybutton, Spilt Milk was written and co-produced by founding members Andy Sturmer and Roger Manning. Albhy Galuten and Jack Joseph Puig also returned as producers.

Named for the hard work and turmoil surrounding its making, Spilt Milk was recorded after the departure of bassist Chris Manning (who was replaced by Tim Smith) and lead guitarist Jason Falkner. Guitar duties were instead handled by session musicians Jon Brion and Lyle Workman. Production lasted several months due to the record's complicated orchestrations, and ultimately ran over-budget.

The album was supported with a yearlong tour that introduced guitarist Eric Dover into the band's line-up. Spilt Milk performed below commercial expectations, peaking at number 164 on the Billboard 200 and number 21 on the UK Albums Chart. Singles "The Ghost at Number One" and "New Mistake" charted at numbers 43 and 55 in the UK, respectively. An expanded deluxe edition of the album was released by Omnivore Recordings in 2015.

== Background ==
During the yearlong promotional tour for the band's debut Bellybutton, tensions arose amongst the band members. The band's bassist Chris Manning left the group at the end of the tour to pursue a quieter life as a producer. The band's lead guitarist Jason Falkner had grown increasingly frustrated with having his songwriting contributions ignored by Andy Sturmer and Roger Manning. He left the group after the tour. In regards to his departure, Falkner recalled being diagnosed with an ulcer due to his deteriorating relationship with Sturmer.

After the tour, Manning and Sturmer collaborated with Ringo Starr for his 1992 solo album Time Takes Time. They were then invited to work with Brian Wilson of the Beach Boys. Wilson and Jellyfish only had one songwriting session that was unproductive. Manning described the experience as "utterly surreal". After their sessions with Starr and Wilson, the band was dedicated to making their next album "their masterpiece".

== Production ==
Spilt Milk was the vision of what we set out to do fully realized. Everything Andy and I would stay up late dreaming and talking and fantasizing about we went for on Bellybutton, which I was proud of. But on Spilt Milk we saw all those ideas seen through to fruition.

— Roger Manning, 2015

The songs were written in Cotati, CA between October 1991 and March 1992. Manning would go over to Sturmer's home to work on the album for eight hours a day, six days a week. Production lasted from April to September 1992; recording sessions used massed choirs, strings, brass, flutes, wind chimes, harpsichords and other instruments. The album was produced by the same producers as their debut, Albhy Galuten (of Bee Gees fame) and Jack Joseph Puig alongside Manning and Sturmer themselves. Also featured on the album were guitarists Tom "T-Bone" Wolk, Lyle Workman, and Jon Brion (who soon formed the Grays with Falkner). Friend Andy Zax wrote of an anecdote in which he met Manning for a late-night meal at a delicatessen, only for Manning to excuse himself "back to the studio because everyone was still there working. It was 3AM." Sturmer remembered: "Once I literally passed out doing a vocal and woke up in the next room. Making this record was like that Army commercial: 'The toughest job you'll ever love.'"

In reference to the band's influences on Spilt Milk, Sturmer denied that they were "over-the-top, like we have somehow created A Night at the Opera Part 2 or something, or Pet Sounds." Referencing comparisons to the Beach Boys on "The Ghost at Number One", Manning stated: "The Beach Boys would never have done it that way, with really hard verses surrounding it and a banjo at the end of the song. We really take pride in exploring the arrangements. Our strength is in incorporating a lot of different things and twisting them in a way that they haven't been twisted before. Music critic Jon Pareles offered that the band distinguished itself from their influences by adding "a fondness for excess: more sudden shifts, pushier drums and guitars, more bursts of vocal harmony. ... The idea is to cram the music with ideas, turning each song into a Rube Goldberg contraption of pop, daring to incorporate the information overload that pop used to hold at bay."

[W]e had lots of hassles trying to put the record together. We thought it sounded good, but it also took too long and cost too much. But we couldn't cry over spilt milk -- hence the title.

— Andy Sturmer, 1993

The title was chosen in reference to the record going over-budget and behind schedule and the group turmoil that followed Bellybutton. The cover was designed by Charisma's staff creative director Mick Haggerty, known for also designing the cover of Supertramp's Breakfast in America and Hall and Oates' H2O. He later commented in an interview: "I can’t remember where the little girl came in, but I do remember the casting call from hell. It’s very uncomfortable to put out a call requesting lots of young girls in ballet tights and tiaras, knowing full well you’re going to choose the saddest and most pathetic one you can find. ... I shot the studio interior first, then the little girl. We tried everything to make her cry, but in the end, used glycerin for her tears, although I know mine were real. The hand pulling back the curtain was to hint at the 'Greatest Show On Earth meets Sgt. Pepper' mood that prevailed in the studio."

== Release ==
Spilt Milk was released on February 9, 1993, on Charisma Records and later peaked at No. 164 on the Billboard 200. Its poor sales were attributed to being released during the height of the popularity of grunge. The album also made an appearance on the Billboard Heatseekers Albums chart, peaking at No. 8. Internationally, the album peaked at No. 21 on the UK Official Albums Chart and No. 100 on the Japan Oricon charts.

The band embarked on a year-long tour in promotion of the album which included a new line up (Tim Smith on bass and Eric Dover on guitar). Two singles were also issued in support of the album. These were "The Ghost at Number One" (which reached No. 9 on the Billboard Alternative Songs chart and No. 43 on the UK Official Singles Chart) and "New Mistake" (which reached No. 55 on the UK Official Singles Chart).

== Critical reception ==
=== Contemporary ===
Professional ratings
Review scores
Source	Rating
Chicago Tribune	2.5/4 stars
Entertainment Weekly	A
NME	8/10
The Philadelphia Inquirer	4/4 stars
Q	4/5 stars
Rocky Mountain News	B+
The Sacramento Bee	2/4 stars
San Jose Mercury News	4/5 stars
Vox	7/10

In his review for Rocky Mountain News, Justin Mitchell called Spilt Milk a "lavishly produced album that begs comparisons to the best of Queen, Supertramp, Squeeze and Paul McCartney, remixed through Jellyfish's '90s sensibilities." He wrote that "what pulls the whole CD together is an unerring sense of superb melodies, harmonies and a lush wall of instruments ranging from basic guitars, bass and drums to the occasional banjo or woodwind section flying through the mix. ... symphonic but never pretentious, sweet but not cloying and crafted throughout with a sly, lyrical sense of humor." Jon Pareles, in The New York Times, said that the band "proudly join[ed] pop's lineage of tuneful tricksters." OffBeat's Pete Ficht wrote that the production was "superb, full of clever flourishes and turnarounds" and that "the songs themselves are great, full of memorable melodies, hooks and lyrics". Although he believed the album was less immediately accessible than Bellybutton, "the more complex arrangements hold promise for future endeavors."

Bruce Bitt of the San Jose Mercury News described Spilt Milk as being "as compelling a homage to the Beatles and the Beach Boys as there is", but one that is "so heavy on production sleight-of-hand that the melodies sometimes collapse beneath the weight of the sound." Though he criticized the album for being "frustratingly derivative", he praised its "sprawling production and loving performances". Spin's Eric Weisbard said that "by pretending to emulate the past, Jellyfish obliterates it. ... When events of not-so-great importance occur twice, the first time it's a farce, the second time it's a dull tragedy."

David Barton of The Sacramento Bee wrote that the album "stoops beneath the Beatles to borrow from Supertramp and Queen at its most bombastic, which may be fascinating listening at first, but quickly grows irritating." He also criticized the lackluster songs and the band for failing to define their own "style and personality". Mark Caro of the Chicago Tribune praised the album's instrumentation, production, and Manning and Sturmer's songwriting, but asked, "Is it possible for "The Ghost at Number One" to cram in just a few more Beach Boys/"Pet Sounds" touches? Is there really a song here called "Too Much, Too Little, Too Late"?" He concluded that "Pop's greatest groups have been about more than just craftsmanship, and they didn't require the listener to expend so much energy discerning between the homage and the fromage."

=== Retrospective ===
Professional ratings
Review scores
Source	Rating
AllMusic	4.5/5 stars
Classic Rock	9/10
The Encyclopedia of Popular Music	4/5 stars
MusicHound Rock	3/5 stars
Shindig!	4/5 stars
Uncut	8/10

Writing in Far Out magazine in 2015, Tony Curran wrote that Spilt Milk had improved with age and said it was a "wonderfully unpretentious homage to pop music in its essential form: catchiness and melody are the keynotes here. From the soaring 'Joining A Fan Club' ... to the psychedelic pop doodlings of 'Sebrina, Paste and Plato' the band explore a range of possibilities within the pop format—and well beyond." Jon Meyers of The Vinyl District said the album was "sharper and far more vibrant than its predecessor, with clever hooks galore." Reviewing the album's 2015 remaster, Alan Sculley of Florida Weekly wrote: "Spilt Milk was an excellent follow-up to the debut, rocking a bit harder without losing any hookiness." Also reviewing the remaster, John Borack of Goldmine opined that "Jellyfish [took] a great leap forward in songwriting, arranging and sonic sheen."

AllMusic's Mark Deming gave Spilt Milk a positive review, describing it as "conceived and executed on a grand scale". He noted that "Sturmer and Manning sound like joyous kids left in a toy shop and making splendid use of every plaything at their disposal." While Deming criticized the production for being "too big for its own good", he concluded that the album was a "a massive balancing act that Jellyfish miraculously pull off; it might seem like a power pop Spruce Goose, but in this case it not only takes off, it flies high as a remarkable experiment in pop-minded rock on the grandest scale."

In 2011, the album was included in a listicle by PopMatters of "The Best Music for Summer". It also appeared in a similar 2015 list by Newsweek of the "best summer albums (released between 1985 and 1997)". Contributor Zach Schonfeld decreed that Spilt Milk was a "lost power-pop masterwork" containing "12 unfashionably sunny and remarkably well-built pop gems about fan clubs, kindergarten classrooms and—in one less-than-subtle instance—the singer's penis. It's the colorfulness of it all that makes it such a great summer record." McFly took influence from Spilt Milk when recording their third album Motion in the Ocean (2006), having been introduced to it by Matt Willis of Busted. Tom Fletcher of McFly described Jellyfish's album as a "masterpiece".

== Track listing ==
All tracks are written by Andy Sturmer and Roger Manning, except "Russian Hill", by Sturmer.

No.	Title	Length
1.	"Hush"	2:10
2.	"Joining a Fan Club"	4:03
3.	"Sebrina, Paste, and Plato"	2:23
4.	"New Mistake"	4:03
5.	"Glutton of Sympathy"	3:49
6.	"The Ghost at Number One"	3:37
7.	"Bye Bye Bye"	4:02
8.	"All Is Forgiven"	4:10
9.	"Russian Hill"	4:45
10.	"He's My Best Friend"	3:44
11.	"Too Much, Too Little, Too Late"	3:15
12.	"Brighter Day"	6:12
Total length:		46:13

=== 2015 Omnivore bonus tracks ===
All tracks are written by Andy Sturmer and Roger Manning, except where noted.

Disc one
No.	Title	Writer(s)	Length
13.	"Family Tree" (Demo)
14.	"Ignorance Is Bliss" (Demo)	Andy Sturmer, Sarah Wirt
15.	"Worthless Heart" (Demo)
16.	"Watchin' the Rain" (Demo)
17.	"I Need Love" (Demo)	Roger Manning
18.	"I Don't Believe You" (Demo)
19.	"Long Time Ago" (Demo)	Sturmer
20.	"Runnin' for Our Lives" (Demo)

Disc two
No.	Title	Writer(s)	Length
1.	"Spilt Milk Intro" (Demo)	Manning
2.	"Hush" (Demo)
3.	"Joining a Fan Club" (Demo)
4.	"Sebrina, Paste and Plato" (Demo)
5.	"New Mistake" (Demo)
6.	"Glutton of Sympathy" (Demo)
7.	"The Ghost at Number One" (Demo)
8.	"All Is Forgiven" (Demo)
9.	"Russian Hill" (Demo)	Sturmer
10.	"He's My Best Friend" (Demo)
11.	"Spilt Milk Outro" (Demo)	Manning
12.	"Think About Your Troubles"	Harry Nilsson
13.	"That Is Why" (Live)
14.	"The Ghost at Number One" (Live)
15.	"Joining a Fan Club" (Live)
16.	"S.O.S." (Live)	Shunichi Tokura, Yū Aku
17.	"Fan Club Message"

== Personnel ==
Jellyfish

- Andy Sturmer – vocals, drums, guitar, keyboards, producer
- Roger Joseph Manning, Jr. – keyboards, piano, vocals, producer
- Tim Smith – bass, vocals

Additional personnel

- Lyle Workman – guitar
- Jon Brion – guitar
- Tom "T-Bone" Wolk – bass
- Jay Bennett – guitar (track 11 - verses, track 12 - outro power chord)
- John Patitucci – upright bass (Russian Hill)
- Bruce Kaphan – pedal steel (Russian Hill)
- Los Angeles Union Session Musicians – orchestrations and additional instrumentation

== Charts ==
Chart (1993)	Peak position
Japanese Albums (Oricon)	100
Swedish Albums (Sverigetopplistan)	33
UK Albums (Official Charts)	21
US Billboard 200	164
US Heatseekers Albums (Billboard)	8
