= Abra Moore =

U.S. female singer song writer

- Born: Abra Moore; June 8, 1969 (age 57); San Diego, California, U.S.
- Origin: Puna, Hawaii, U.S.
- Genres: Rock, pop, country
- Occupations: singer, songwriter
- Instruments: Guitar, banjo, piano, keyboards, vocals
- Years active: 1988–present
- Labels: Bohemia Beat, Arista Austin, J, Koch, Sarathan

Abra Moore (born June 8, 1969) is an American folk-styled rock singer-songwriter. Moore was a founding member of the Hawaiian rock band Poi Dog Pondering, but left to pursue a solo career after the group's move to Texas in the late 1980s. Her 1997 album Strangest Places included the hit "Four Leaf Clover", which received airplay in Midwest U.S. radio markets and VH1 and MTV2 rotation, and charted on the Billboard Hot 100.

== Early life ==
Moore's parents are Dale and Lisa Moore. Her father named her after the heroine of John Steinbeck's East of Eden. She was raised in Puna, Hawaii, with three brothers—Matt, Pepe, and Zack—and sister Mia in a bohemian household that had very strong jazz influences, including jam sessions by guest musicians.

== Career ==
Abra was influenced by the sax music that her brother, Matt Moore, an accomplished Hawaii Jazz musician, played during her childhood. When she was 19, she joined Poi Dog Pondering with a group of friends, moving to Los Angeles in 1988, and then to Austin, Texas, in 1992. Abra left the band shortly afterward to pursue a solo career. Her first album was Sing (1995), followed by Strangest Places (1997), which had a companion CD Live from the Strangest Places, featuring acoustic versions of several tracks from the album. A single from this album, "Four Leaf Clover", peaked at number 63 on the Billboard Hot 100; it was her only charting single. "Four Leaf Clover" was nominated for the 1998 Grammy Award for Best Female Rock Vocal Performance. During this time, another of her songs, "Trip on Love", was featured in the soundtrack for the 1999 film Cruel Intentions. "Don't Feel Like Cryin" also featured in the 1998 film Sliding Doors.

Abra continued to work on her next studio album No Fear, while contributing songs to several soundtracks. Amidst rumors of creative differences and contractual conflicts, she changed management and recording companies, and the album was eventually shelved. However, her record label, J Records, did release promo copies. Most of the songs later appeared in slightly altered versions on Everything Changed (Koch Records, 2004). Abra's most recent CD, On the Way, was released by Sarathan Records on June 12, 2007.

She appeared in the 1991 movie Slacker and has done other occasional film work in addition to her music career.

== Discography ==
Albums

- Sing (Bohemia Beat Records, 1995)
- Strangest Places (Arista Austin/Bohemia Beat Records, 1997) Reached No. 24 Billboard Heatseekers
- No Fear (J Records, 2002; never commercially released)
- Everything Changed (Koch Records, 2004)
- On the Way (Sarathan Records, 2007)

EPs

- Live from the Strangest Places (Arista Austin, 1998)

Singles

- "Four Leaf Clover" (1997); #63 Billboard Hot 100, #27 Billboard Alternative Songs, #1 Billboard Adult Alternative Songs
- "Strangest Places" (1997)
- "Don't Feel Like Cryin'" (1998); #17 Billboard Adult Alternative Songs

== See also ==
- Poi Dog Pondering
