= Everything Changed (album) =

Studio album by Abra Moore
- Released: April 23, 2004
- Studio: Antarctica, Nashville, Tennessee, US; East Iris Studios, Nashville, Tennessee, US; The Institute, Austin, Texas, US; Presto! Recordings, Lincoln, Nebraska, US; Tragedy; Tragedy, Nashville, Tennessee, US; Viewpoint Studios, Austin, Texas, US; Wire Recording, Austin, Texas, US
- Length: 50:04
- Language: English
- Label: Koch
- Producer: Jay Joyce; Mike Mogis; Mitch Watkins

Abra Moore chronology
Strangest Places (1997)	Everything Changed (2004)	On the Way (2007)

Everything Changed is a 2004 studio album by American singer-songwriter Abra Moore. The album has received positive reviews by critics.

== Reception ==
Editors at AllMusic rated this album 4.5 out of 5 stars, with critic Thom Jurek writing that this album needs to be assessed in terms of Moore's struggle to make a follow-up to her commercial break-through and the result is "something mercurial, enigmatic; in essence, it is a work of desire but not covetousness" that "elevates the pop song to the place of art form and poetry". In The Austin Chronicle, Raoul Hernandez rated this album 3.5 out of 5 stars, calling it "an accomplished album whose emotional complexity resists it". Industry magazine Billboard chose this as an album pick with reviewer Christa L. Titus the "autobiographical" album shows "an artist who has been able to heal and move on" both from professional issues and the death of her father. A brief review in Entertainment Weekly by Marc Weingarten stated that "Moore doesn’t have much to work with here" and the songs devolve into "singer-songwriter cliche". A review in No Depression stated that the "neo-psychedelic arrangements, strummy acoustic guitar-based ruminations and stately piano balladry... should qualify Moore for some type of comeback-of-the-year award".

== Track listing ==
All songs written by Abra Moore, except where noted.

1. "I Do" (Jay Joyce, Moore, and Michael Ramos) – 4:23
2. "No Fear" (Joyce and Moore) – 4:06
3. "Big Sky" (Joyce and Moore) – 4:08
4. "If You Want Me To" – 3:22
5. "Taking Chances" – 3:42
6. "Melancholy Love" – 4:19
7. "Family Affair" – 4:32
8. "Pull Away" – 4:20
9. "The End" – 3:38
10. "Everything Changed" – 2:55
11. "Paint On Your Wings" – 2:42
12. "I Win" (Paul deLay and Moore) – 4:22
13. "Shining Star" (Tawnya Lorae and Moore) – 3:35

== Personnel ==
- Abra Moore – guitar, acoustic guitar, piano, drums, vocals
- Tom Briggs – product management
- Jeff Chenault – art direction, design
- George Couri – executive production
- John Deaderick – keyboards
- Jamie Desautels – strings
- Dianne Donovan – assistant engineering
- Mike Elam – trumpet
- Chris Feinstein – bass guitar
- James D. Hall – trumpet
- Jason Hall – engineering
- Dave Harrison – drums
- Jay Joyce – bass guitar, guitar, backing vocals, programming, engineering, mixing, production
- Hardi Kamsani – assistance
- Steve Kaplan – assistance
- A. J. Mogis – upright bass
- Chris LeBeau – photo production
- Chris Lord-Alge – mixing
- Leigh Mahoney – strings
- Pat Mastelotto – drums
- Kevin Killen – mixing
- Mark Morris – instrumentation
- Mike Mogis – ARP synthesizer, banjo, glockenspiel, guitar, Mellotron, engineering, mixing, production
- Giles Reaves – drums, keyboards, piano, mixing
- Neal Rosengarden – French horn, trumpet
- Jon Sanchez – instrumentation
- Shane Sanders – strings
- Steven Sebring – photography
- Kyle Schneider – instrumentation
- Stuart Sullivan – engineering
- Maria Taylor – backing vocals
- Will Taylor – mixing, strings
- Mitch Watkins – acoustic guitar, electric guitar, bass guitar, keyboard bass, synthesizer, backing vocals, engineering, mixing, production

== See also ==
- List of 2004 albums
