= Bellybutton (album) =

Studio album by Jellyfish
- Released: July 27, 1990
- Studios: Schnee; Studio 55; Ocean Way
- Genre: Power pop
- Length: 39:32
- Label: Charisma
- Producers: Albhy Galuten; Jack Joseph Puig

Jellyfish chronology
Bellybutton (1990)	Jellyfish Comes Alive (1991)

Bellybutton is the debut album by American rock band Jellyfish, released on July 27, 1990, on Charisma Records. It was recorded after Andy Sturmer and Roger Manning's departure from Beatnik Beatch and Jason Falkner's departure from the Three O'Clock. The album was recorded in Schnee Studios in North Hollywood and produced by Albhy Galuten and Jack Joseph Puig.

Bellybutton was released to critical acclaim and peaked at No. 124 on US charts. "Baby's Coming Back" was covered by the British band McFly in 2007, which reached No. 1 on the UK Singles Chart. An expanded deluxe edition was released by Omnivore Recordings in 2015.

== Background ==
Before the formation of Jellyfish, Andy Sturmer and Roger Manning were in the group Beatnik Beatch. Sturmer was the group's drummer, singer, and songwriter. Manning was the group's keyboardist. Jason Falkner during this time was the lead guitarist for the Three O’Clock, a Los Angeles-based Paisley Underground band.

Manning and Sturmer had known each other since high school. Sturmer had initially become the group's drummer but transitioned into one of the group's vocalists and songwriters. Manning joined Beatnik Beatch after the band's keyboardist had quit. Manning and Sturmer soon began collaborating, writing compositions that were stylistically different from the songs the band was producing at the time. Soon after the group released its eponymous debut album in 1989, Manning and Sturmer left the group to continue songwriting with one another.

Falkner had originally put a newspaper advertisement looking for “like-minded musicians”. Manning responded to Falkner's ad and the two met to collaborate. Nothing initially came out of the meeting. However, once Manning and Sturmer had left Beatnik Beatch, Manning got back in touch with Falkner to see if he was interested. Falkner was persuaded by the prospect of a major-label deal.

== Songwriting and production ==
Despite the recent major-label deal, the songwriting sessions were tumultuous in nature. Falkner describes not getting along with Sturmer. Falkner claims Manning had warned him about Sturmer's strong personality. He also claims that Manning and Sturmer's relationship was difficult despite the songwriting partnership. Falkner recalled Manning going up to him in tears and exclaiming, “Screw this, It’s too hard.”

The album was recorded at Schnee Studios in North Hollywood. Falkner performed the majority of the bass tracks on the album; the group was also accompanied by Steven Shane McDonald. The album was produced by Albhy Galuten (who achieved fame for producing the Bee Gees' album Saturday Night Fever) and engineer Jack Joseph Puig.

== Release and promotion ==
Bellybutton was released on July 27, 1990, on Charisma Records. The band embarked on a yearlong tour in support of Bellybutton with Roger Manning's younger brother Chris joining as the band's bassist. While on tour, the band opened up for the bands the Black Crowes and World Party.

The album spawned the singles "The King Is Half-Undressed" (which reached No. 19 on Billboard's Modern Rock Chart and No. 39 on the UK Singles Chart), "That Is Why" (which reached No. 11 on Billboard's Modern Rock Chart), "Baby's Coming Back" (which reached No. 62 on Billboard's Hot 100 chart and No. 54 on the UK Singles Chart), and “I Wanna Stay Home” (which reached No. 59 on the UK Singles Chart).

An extended play was released in support of Bellybutton, titled The Scary-Go-Round E.P., which reached No. 49 on the UK Singles Chart.

The home video Gone Jellyfishin' was also issued with the promo videos from Bellybutton ("The King Is Half-Undressed", which was nominated for Best Art Direction at the 1991 MTV Video Music Awards, "That Is Why" and "Baby's Coming Back"). The band's music videos were heavily aired on MTV.

== Reception ==
Professional ratings
Review scores
Source	Rating
AllMusic	4/5 stars
Classic Rock	8/10
The Encyclopedia of Popular Music	5/5 stars
MusicHound Rock	4.5/5 stars
Q	5/5 stars
Shindig!	4/5 stars
Select	4/5 stars
The State	5/5 stars
Uncut	9/10

Bellybutton was acclaimed by contemporary music critics. However, despite a promotional tour and heavy rotation on MTV, the album failed to reach a wide audience and was a commercial disappointment. The album peaked at No. 124 on the Billboard 200. In a review for the newspaper The State, staff writer Michael Miller gave the album five stars and called the album "the best pop album of the year." He describes the album by saying that it incorporated "the inventive melodies of the Beatles, the vocal harmonies of 10CC and contemporary rhythms of XTC and Crowded House". He concludes by saying that "this attention to detail should help Jellyfish float to the top." Reviewer Mat Snow in magazine Q also gave the album a five-star review calling it "an outstanding debut".

In a retrospective review for the album, Mark Deming of AllMusic says that the band "had all the key ingredients of classic power pop down cold—the sweet but biting melodies, the addictive hooks, the gorgeous stacks of harmonies, and the '60s-styled musical accents—and then revved them up with rock star-proportioned drums and guitars on tunes...". He cites the songs "All I Want is Everything", "The King is Half-Undressed", "I Wanna Stay Home", and "Baby's Coming Back" as album highlights. He concludes by saying that the band "left behind a great pop record that also rocks hard, no small achievement."

The song "I Wanna Stay Home" was covered by Rod Stewart on his box set The Rod Stewart Sessions 1971 - 1998.

In 2007, Burning Sky Records released a track-by-track tribute under the title Sensory Lullabies: The Ultimate Tribute To Jellyfish.

== Track listing ==
All tracks are written by Andy Sturmer and Roger Manning, except where noted.

No.	Title	Writer(s)	Length
1.	"The Man I Used to Be"		4:33
2.	"That Is Why"		4:16
3.	"The King Is Half-Undressed"		3:46
4.	"I Wanna Stay Home"	Sturmer	4:06
5.	"She Still Loves Him"		4:30
6.	"All I Want Is Everything"	Sturmer	3:44
7.	"Now She Knows She's Wrong"		2:35
8.	"Bedspring Kiss"		5:03
9.	"Baby's Coming Back"	Sturmer	2:57
10.	"Calling Sarah"		4:02

Bonus tracks
No.	Title	Writer(s)	Length
11.	"No Matter What"	Pete Ham	2:48
12.	"Let 'Em In/That Is Why"	Paul McCartney (Let 'Em In), Manning, Sturmer (That Is Why)	4:58
13.	"The King Is Half Undressed"		3:38
14.	"Jet"	Paul McCartney, Linda McCartney	3:08
15.	"Now She Knows She's Wrong"		2:45
16.	"Baby's Coming Back"	Sturmer	3:05

Tracks 11–15 are live tracks appearing on the UK Limited Edition release.

Track 16 is a live acoustic track appearing on the Japanese Reissue Edition release.

== Personnel ==
- Andy Sturmer – lead and backing vocals, drums, guitar, keyboards
- Roger Joseph Manning Jr. – keyboards, piano, harpsichord, vocals
- Jason Falkner – guitar, bass, backing vocals
- Chris Manning – "Band Witchdoctor and Mime"
- Steven Shane McDonald – bass on "All I Want Is Everything", "Now She Knows She's Wrong" (Courtesy of Redd Kross)
- John Patitucci – bass on "The Man I Used To Be", "I Wanna Stay Home" & "Bedspring Kiss"
- Tommy Morgan – harmonica
- Chuck Findley – trumpet

== Charts ==
Chart (1990)	Peak position
US Billboard 200	124
