= Jack Joseph Puig =

American audio engineer, A&R executive, and record producer

Jack Joseph Puig is an American audio engineer, record executive, and record producer. He has worked with Tonic, Hole, Jellyfish, Dan Balan, The Black Crowes, John Mayer, Weezer, Fiona Apple, Roger Hodgson, Taxiride, Green Day, Counting Crows, No Doubt, Klaxons, Rancid, Panic! at the Disco, Stone Temple Pilots, L7, and U2, among others. Puig has shared Grammy Awards with The Goo Goo Dolls, Sheryl Crow, Vanessa Carlton, John Mayer, Fergie (The Black Eyed Peas), U2, and No Doubt.

In 2006, Puig was named executive vice president of Interscope-Geffen-A&M Records. He has signed Klaxons and Charlotte Sometimes. As an A&R, he works with Shirley Manson, Ashlee Simpson, Klaxons, Charlotte Sometimes, Counting Crows, Puddle of Mudd, and The Like.

Prior to his mainstream music production successes, Puig rose to prominence as an engineer in the Contemporary Christian music scene of the mid-eighties. He worked mainly on Myrrh Records releases. He engineered for Christian acts such as Amy Grant, Kathy Troccoli, Leslie Phillips, and Russ Taff. Some of the records he engineered were Grammy-award winning works such as Grant's landmark 1985 LP, Unguarded.

== Mixing approach ==
Puig's long-running mix room at Ocean Way Studios is built around a heavily modified Focusrite console and a large collection of analog outboard processors spanning multiple eras. He has described his approach as deliberately combining older analog circuitry with current digital tools, aiming to give each record a distinct sonic identity rather than relying on gear that most engineers already use.

== Discography ==
- Maranatha! Singers – Praise II (1976) e
- Sweet Comfort Band – Sweet Comfort (1977) e
- Gallagher and Lyle – Showdown (1978) e
- Jamie Owens-Collins – Love Eyes (1978) e
- Honeytree – Maranatha Marathon (1979) e/m
- Phil Keaggy – Ph'lip Side (1980) e
- B. J. Thomas – In Concert (1980) e
- Jamie Owens-Collins – Straight Ahead (1980) e
- The Archers – Celebrate: Live in Concert (1980) m
- Amy Grant – Never Alone (1980) e
- Debby Boone – With My Song (1980) e
- The Brothers Johnson – Winners (1981) e/m
- Amy Grant – In Concert (1981) e
- John Michael Talbot – For the Bride (1981) e
- Sweet Comfort Band – Hearts of Fire (1981) e/p/m
- Sweet Comfort Band - Cutting Edge (1982) e
- Amy Grant – Age to Age (1982) e
- Irene Cara – What a Feelin' (1982) e
- Leslie Phillips - Beyond Saturday Night (1983) e
- Russ Taff – Walls of Glass (1983) e
- Amy Grant – A Christmas Album (1983) e/m
- Debby Boone – Surrender (1983) e
- Amy Grant – Straight Ahead (1984) e
- Barbra Streisand – Emotion (1984) e/m
- Dan Peek – Doer of the Word (1984) e
- Michael W. Smith – Michael W. Smith 2 (1984) e/m
- White Heart – Vital Signs (1984) m
- Kenny Loggins – Vox Humana (1985) e
- Amy Grant – Unguarded (1985) e/m
- Russ Taff – Medals (1985) p/m
- Melissa Manchester – Mathematics (1985) e
- James Newton Howard – James Newton Howard and Friends (1985) e
- Patti Austin – Gettin' Away with Murder (1985) e
- Diana Ross – Eaten Alive e/m
- Amy Grant – The Collection (1986) e
- Smokey Robinson – Smoke Signals (1986) e
- White Heart – Live at Six Flags (1986) e
- Toto – Fahrenheit (1986) e
- Chris Eaton – Vision (1986) e/p
- Chaka Khan – "The Other Side of the World" (1986) m
- Russ Taff – Russ Taff (1987) p/m
- Roger Hodgson – Hai Hai (1987) e/p/m
- Olivia Newton-John – The Rumour (1988) e
- Glenn Frey – Soul Searchin' (1988) e
- Russell Hitchcock – Russell Hitchcock (1988) e
- Randy Newman – Land of Dreams (1988) e
- Phil Keaggy – Phil Keaggy and Sunday's Child (1988) e/m
- Green on Red – This Time Around (1989) e
- Nanci Griffith – Storms (1989) e
- Eric Clapton – Journeyman (1989) e
- Bette Midler – Beaches: Original Soundtrack Recording (1989) e
- John Hiatt – Stolen Moments (1990) e/m
- Bette Midler – Some People's Lives (1990) e/m
- Jellyfish – Bellybutton (1990) e/p/m
- Roberta Flack – Set the Night to Music (1991) e
- Dire Straits – On Every Street (1991) e
- Huey Lewis and the News – Hard at Play (1991) m
- Bette Midler – For the Boys (Music from the Motion Picture) (1991) e
- Jackson Browne and Jennifer Warnes – "Golden Slumbers" (1991) e/m
- The Spent Poets – The Spent Poets (1992) e/m
- Fabulon - All Girls are Pretty Vol. 1 (1992)
- Jellyfish – Spilt Milk (1993) e/p/m
- Michael Crawford – A Touch of Music in the Night (1993) e
- Russ Taff – We Will Stand Yesterday and Today (1994) p
- The Grays – Ro Sham Bo (1994) p
- Michael Crawford – Favorite Love Songs (1994) e
- The Black Crowes – Amorica (1994) e/p/m
- The Manhattan Transfer – Tonin' (1995) e
- Belly – King (1995) e/m
- Bette Midler – Bette of Roses (1995) e
- The Badloves – Holy Roadside (1995) m
- Aimee Mann – I'm with Stupid (1995) m
- Tonic – Lemon Parade (1996) e/p/m
- Weezer – Pinkerton (1996) e/m
- The Black Crowes – Three Snakes & One Charm (1996) e/p/m
- Jason Falkner – Presents Author Unknown (1996) m
- Steven Curtis Chapman – Signs of Life (1996) m
- Susanna Hoffs – Susanna Hoffs (1996) e/p/m
- Dimestore Hoods – "Blood in My Eyes" (1996) p
- L7 – The Beauty Process: Triple Platinum (1997) m
- Talk Show – Talk Show (1997) m
- Abra Moore – Strangest Places (1997) m
- Lincoln – "Blow" (1997) p/m
- Birdbrain – Let's Be Nice (1997) m
- Big Wreck – In Loving Memory Of... (1997) m
- Third Day – Conspiracy No. 5 (1997) m
- Son Volt – Wide Swing Tremolo (1998) m
- Nada Surf – The Proximity Effect (1998) m
- Clutch – The Elephant Riders (1998) m
- The Black Crowes – Sho' Nuff (1998) e/p/m
- Athenaeum – Radiance (1998) m
- Seven Mary Three – Orange Ave. (1998) m
- Better than Ezra – "Like It Like That" (1998) m
- Fretblanket – Home Truths from Abroad (1998) m
- Semisonic – Feeling Strangely Fine (1998) m
- Dada – Dada (1998) p/m
- Robbie Williams – I've Been Expecting You (1998) p/m
- Hole – Celebrity Skin (1998) m
- Ugly Americans – Boom Boom Baby (1998) m
- Jeff Black – Birmingham Road (1998) m
- Leah Andreone – Alchemy (1998) m
- Goo Goo Dolls – Dizzy Up the Girl (1998) p/m
- Dovetail Joint – 001 (1999) m
- Gus – Word of Mouth Parade (1999) m
- Delirious? – Mezzamorphis (1999) m
- The Verve Pipe – The Verve Pipe (1999) m
- Deckard – "Still" (1999) m
- Sparklehorse – Good Morning Spider (1999) p/m
- Kendall Payne – Jordan's Sister (1999) m
- Verbena – "Pretty Please" (1999) m
- Stone Temple Pilots – "Revolution" (1999) m
- Counting Crows – This Desert Life (1999) m
- Beck – "Nicotine & Gravy" (1999) m
- Taxiride – Imaginate (1999) e/p
- Hole – "Be a Man" (1999) m
- No Doubt – Return of Saturn (2000) m
- Green Day – Warning (2000) m
- Cherry Poppin' Daddies – Soul Caddy (2000) p/m
- BBMak – "Unpredictable" (2000) m
- Goudie – Peep Show (2000) m
- Tara MacLean – Passenger (2000) m
- Collective Soul – Blender (2000) m
- SR-71 – Now You See Inside (2000) m
- Five for Fighting – America Town (2000) m
- J Mascis + The Fog – "Where'd You Go" (2000) m
- Electrasy – In Here We Fall (2000) m
- Shelby Lynne – Bridget Jones' Diary, original soundtrack (2001) m
- Tricky – Blowback (2001) m
- Athenaeum – Athenaeum (2001) m
- Remy Zero – The Golden Hum (2001) e/p/m
- Taxiride – Garage Mahal (2002) m
- Headstrong – Headstrong (2002) m
- The Rolling Stones – 40 Licks (2002) m
- Phantom Planet – The Guest (2002) m
- Sheryl Crow – C'mon, C'mon (2002) m
- Vanessa Carlton – Be Not Nobody (2002) m
- Counting Crows – Hard Candy (2002) m
- Steven Curtis Chapman – All About Love (2003) m
- Switchfoot – The Beautiful Letdown (2003) m
- Stereomud – Every Given Moment (2003) m
- The Ataris – So Long, Astoria (2003) m
- Stereophonics – You Gotta Go There to Come Back (2003) m
- John Mayer – Heavier Things (2003) e/p/m
- No Doubt – The Singles: 1992-2003 (2003) m
- 311 – Greatest Hits '93-'03 (2004) m
- Steven Curtis Chapman – All Things New (2004) m
- Sum 41 – "Killer Queen" (2005) e/p/m
- Acceptance - Phantoms (2005) m
- Aqualung – Strange and Beautiful (2005) m
- Son Volt – Retrospective 1995-2000 (2005) m
- The Black Eyed Peas – Monkey Business (2005) m
- The Rolling Stones – A Bigger Bang (2005) m
- The Pussycat Dolls – PCD (2005) m
- Mary J. Blige – The Breakthrough (2005) m
- John Hiatt – Chronicles (2005) e/m
- Goo Goo Dolls – Let Love In (2006) m
- Dashboard Confessional – Dusk and Summer (2006) m
- Fergie – The Dutchess (2006) m
- Zucchero Fornaciari – Fly (2006) m
- The Academy Is... – Santi (2007) m
- Macy Gray – Big (2007) m
- U2 – Instant Karma: The Amnesty International Campaign to Save Darfur (2007) p/m
- Lifehouse – Who We Are (2007) m
- Queen Latifah – Trav'lin' Light (2007) m
- Puddle of Mudd – "Psycho" (2007) p/m
- Klaxons – "Golden Skans" (Radio Remix) (2007) m
- Eric Clapton – Complete Clapton (2007) m
- Panic! at the Disco – "Nine in the Afternoon" (2007) m
- Charlotte Sometimes – Waves and the Both of Us (2008) p/m
- Jack Savoretti – Harder Than Easy (2009) m
- Kylie Morgan (2010)
- Owl City – All Things Bright and Beautiful (2011)
- MENEW – Wide Awake Hello (2012)
- Eros – Rockstar (2012)
- 3 Doors Down – The Greatest Hits (2012)
- Dan Balan - Freedom, Part One (2012)
