= Andy Sturmer =

American television composer

- Born: Marvin Andrew Sturmer; March 11, 1965 (age 61); Los Angeles County, California, U.S.
- Genres: Power pop; children's music
- Occupations: Musician; singer; songwriter; composer; record producer
- Instruments: Vocals; drums; guitar; keyboards
- Years active: 1987–present
- Labels: Atlantic; Charisma

Marvin Andrew Sturmer (born March 11, 1965) is an American musician, singer, songwriter, and composer who co-founded the rock band Jellyfish in 1989. He was the group's lead vocalist, drummer, and primary songwriter. Following their break-up in 1994, Sturmer became involved with Tamio Okuda, as writer and producer for the Japanese pop duo Puffy AmiYumi. Although Sturmer maintains a low public profile, he continues working as a songwriter for cartoons produced by Disney and Cartoon Network.

== Jellyfish ==
Sturmer attended Amador Valley High School in Pleasanton, California in the 1970s. There, he was a drummer in the school's jazz band, and met keyboardist Roger Manning. Manning recalled of Sturmer: "I've never seen anyone of his age with that expertise and command of his instrument. Andy was one of the first kids in our town who took it seriously and had a goal. He was my hero." They later joined the group Beatnik Beatch. When the band dissolved in 1988, Sturmer and Manning formed Jellyfish.

Jellyfish released two albums, Bellybutton (1990) and Spilt Milk (1993). Sturmer wrote all of the lyrics, but composed the music with Manning. He had the rare distinction of not only being a drummer who regularly sang lead in a rock group, but also one who played a stand-up drum set at the front of the stage instead of sitting on a throne at the rear of the band. While their records earned critical praise and they toured the world several times, Jellyfish failed to meet commercial expectations, and intra-group friction led to Jellyfish's dissolution in early 1994.

In a May 1994 article published in the San Francisco Chronicle, it was reported that Sturmer and Manning would form new bands in the aftermath of Jellyfish. Sturmer nearly released a solo album on Virgin Records before deciding against the proposal. Manning later said, "It was a surprise to me that Andy chose the route he did. I felt sure he'd make solo albums of his own material, like [one unreleased] ballad he played me. That was a brilliant song and the world should hear it." Elsewhere, Manning attributed the break-up partly to Sturmer's discomfort as frontman: "Andy never wanted to be in the spotlight, but he was never honest with himself. With Jellyfish, he couldn't have been in more foreign territory."

== Puffy AmiYumi and other work ==
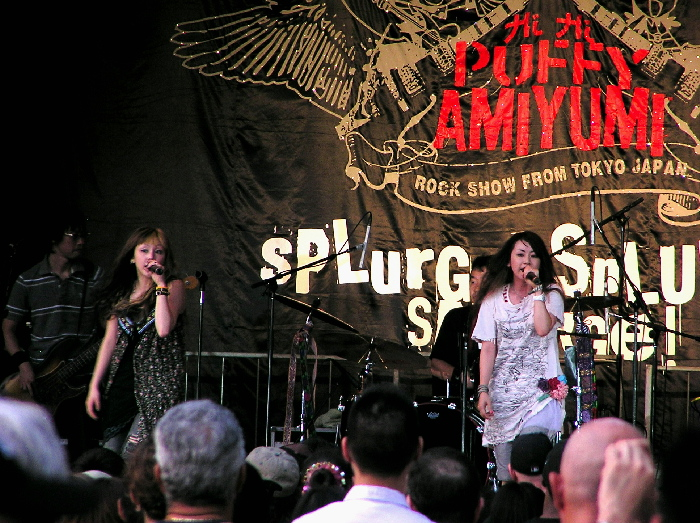
Sturmer is credited with naming the Japanese band Puffy (pictured 2006), as well as writing and co-producing their records with Tamio Okuda

Sturmer subsequently devoted his career to producing and writing for other artists. Among his first projects was the Japanese pop duo Puffy (known as Puffy AmiYumi outside of Japan). He was already a friend of main Puffy composer and producer Tamio Okuda and was credited as "godfather" of the band for giving the group their name. Sturmer also worked with the Swedish pop band the Merrymakers, who tracked him down through the Internet. He ultimately played all the drums on their 1997 album Bubblegun and co-produced four tracks.

Puffy were approached by Cartoon Network to sing the theme song for the 2003 animated series Teen Titans. Originally suggested by the series' producer Sam Register, creator Glen Murakami was delighted when he learned Sturmer would be writing and producing the track. In 2004, Sturmer also became the consulting producer and theme song composer for the cartoon Hi Hi Puffy AmiYumi. After composing and producing most of the songs on Puffy AmiYumi's Nice (2003) and 59 (2004), his involvement with the band lessened.

Following his work on Hi Hi Puffy AmiYumi, Sturmer composed theme songs for other Cartoon Network series, including Ben 10 (alongside its score composition), Batman: The Brave and the Bold, and the third season of The Batman animated series. He also composed the score and wrote the songs for the Disney series My Friends Tigger & Pooh and performed the theme song for Transformers Animated. In 2006, he worked with Mike Viola on the album Alpacas Orgling (credited to LEO).

In the liner notes for the 2002 Jellyfish box set Fan Club, it is stated that Sturmer had been planning "an imminent solo record to be released over the Internet." In 2015, a journalist reported that Sturmer had refused all requests for interviews about his past or current work, although Sturmer agreed to be interviewed for the 2016 book Brighter Day: A Jellyfish Story. Also in 2015, Manning commented in an interview that the reason Jellyfish has never reunited was mostly due to Sturmer's "lack of interest". He added: "I know many people that work with him in film and TV always tell me how happy and successful he is. Last I heard he had four or five shows on Disney that he was scoring."

Andy has also participated in the soundtrack of The Looney Tunes Show (2011-2013) and performed the theme from Tom and Jerry, written by Scott Bradley, for The Tom and Jerry Show (2014-2021): both produced by Warner Bros. Animation for Cartoon Network.
