= The Collection (Amy Grant album) =

Compilation album by Amy Grant
- Released: July 22, 1986
- Recorded: 1978–86
- Studio: Ocean Way Recording (Hollywood, California); The Bennett House (Franklin, Tennessee); Bullet Recording (Nashville, Tennessee)
- Genre: Contemporary Christian music
- Length: 69:12
- Label: Myrrh, A&M
- Producer: Brown Bannister Johnny Potoker

Amy Grant chronology
Unguarded (1985)	The Collection (1986)	The Animals' Christmas (1986)

Singles from The Collection
- 1. "Stay for Awhile" Released: 1986

Professional ratings
Review scores
Source	Rating
Allmusic	5/5 stars

The Collection is a compilation album by Christian music singer Amy Grant, released in 1986 (see 1986 in music).

The Collection was the first compilation of Grant's music to be released, and it was issued after her crossover success in 1985 with the album Unguarded. The Collection spanned Grant's first decade in music, and featured the new songs "Stay for Awhile" and "Love Can Do", the former of which was a Top Twenty Adult Contemporary hit in the United States.

== Release ==
The Collection was originally released in two different versions: a cassette version and an LP version. The LP version was directed to her newer fans, who knew her primarily for her Top 40 pop hit "Find a Way". The cassette version was directed to her older fans, who knew her for her Christian work as well as her secular work. The LP version contained ten tracks, and the cassette version contained fifteen tracks. In 1990, The Collection was re-released on CD with the 15 tracks featured on the cassette version, and two additional tracks, "Too Late" and "I'm Gonna Fly". Word Canada accidentally released the ten-track LP version to CD. The cover and tray art were that of the seventeen-track version causing confusion and recalls. They later issued the seventeen-track version as well. Of Grant's albums released prior to this compilation's release, Amy Grant (1977) and In Concert (1981) are the only albums that are not represented with songs included on this compilation. According to CCM Magazine, The Collection is the best-selling Christian music compilation album ever released, having sold in excess of 1 million copies.

An unauthorized reproduction of the album artwork (featuring Grant) was used for issue No. 15 of the Marvel Comics series Dr. Strange (1990). Apparently, the issue's artist was a fan of the singer and decided to use her likeness for a character in the story.

In 2007, The Collection was reissued and digitally remastered by Grant's new record label, EMI/Sparrow Records. The remastered edition is labeled with a "Digitally Remastered" logo in the 'gutter' on the CD front.

== Track listing ==
=== LP version ===
==== Side A ====
No.	Title	Writer(s)	Original album	Length
1.	"Stay for Awhile"	Amy Grant, Wayne Kirkpatrick, Michael W. Smith	new recording	5:37
2.	"Find a Way"	Grant, Smith	Unguarded (1985)	3:27
3.	"Everywhere I Go"	Mary Lee Kortes	Unguarded	4:10
4.	"Angels"	Grant, Brown Bannister, Gary Chapman, Smith	Straight Ahead (1984)	4:10
5.	"El Shaddai"	Michael Card, John Thompson	Age to Age (1982)	4:06

==== Side B ====
No.	Title	Writer(s)	Original album	Length
1.	"Love Can Do"	Grant, Kirkpatrick, Smith	new recording	4:22
2.	"Sing Your Praise to the Lord"	Rich Mullins	Age to Age	3:17
3.	"Father's Eyes"	Chapman	My Father's Eyes (1979)	4:05
4.	"Thy Word"	Grant, Smith	Straight Ahead	3:19
5.	"Emmanuel"	Smith	A Christmas Album (1983)	3:07

=== Original cassette version ===
==== Side one ====
No.	Title	Writer(s)	Original album	Length
1.	"Stay for Awhile"	Grant, Kirkpatrick, Smith	new recording	5:37
2.	"Love Can Do"	Grant, Kirkpatrick, Smith	new recording	4:22
3.	"Find a Way"	Grant, Smith	Unguarded	3:27
4.	"Everywhere I Go"	Kortes	Unguarded	4:10
5.	"Angels"	Grant, Bannister, Chapman, Smith	Straight Ahead	4:10
6.	"Thy Word"	Grant, Smith	Straight Ahead	3:19
7.	"Emmanuel"	Smith	A Christmas Album	3:07
8.	"Where Do You Hide Your Heart"	Grant, Smith	Straight Ahead	3:55

==== Side two ====
No.	Title	Writer(s)	Original album	Length
1.	"Sing Your Praise to the Lord"	Mullins	Age to Age	3:17
2.	"In a Little While"	Grant, Bannister, Chapman, Shane Keister	Age to Age	4:22
3.	"El Shaddai"	Card, Thompson	Age to Age	4:06
4.	"I Have Decided"	Card	Age to Age	3:16
5.	"All I Ever Have to Be"	Chapman	Never Alone (1980)	2:38
6.	"Father's Eyes"	Chapman	My Father's Eyes	4:05
7.	"Ageless Medley"	Grant, Bannister, Card, Chapman, Chris Christian, Mullins, Thompson	non-album single (1983)	6:10

=== CD version ===
No.	Title	Writer(s)	Original album	Length
1.	"Stay for Awhile"	Grant, Kirkpatrick, Smith	new recording	5:37
2.	"Love Can Do"	Grant, Kirkpatrick, Smith	new recording	4:22
3.	"Find a Way"	Grant, Smith	Unguarded	3:27
4.	"Everywhere I Go"	Kortes	Unguarded	4:10
5.	"Angels"	Grant, Bannister, Chapman, Smith	Straight Ahead	4:10
6.	"Thy Word"	Grant, Smith	Straight Ahead	3:19
7.	"Emmanuel"	Smith	A Christmas Album	3:07
8.	"Where Do You Hide Your Heart"	Grant, Smith	Straight Ahead	3:55
9.	"Sing Your Praise to the Lord"	Mullins	Age to Age	3:17
10.	"In a Little While"	Grant, Bannister, Chapman, Keister	Age to Age	4:22
11.	"El Shaddai"	Card, Thompson	Age to Age	4:06
12.	"I Have Decided"	Card	Age to Age	3:16
13.	"Too Late" (live)	Grant, Bannister, Christian	In Concert Volume Two (1981)	4:24
14.	"I'm Gonna Fly" (live)	Grant	In Concert Volume Two	4:23
15.	"All I Ever Have to Be"	Chapman	Never Alone	2:38
16.	"Father's Eyes"	Chapman	My Father's Eyes	4:05
17.	"Ageless Medley"	Grant, Bannister, Card, Chapman, Christian, Mullins, Thompson	non-album single	6:10

== Personnel ==
- Amy Grant – lead vocals, backing vocals on "Stay for Awhile"
- Robbie Buchanan – keyboards
- David Gamson – keyboards
- Michael W. Smith – keyboards
- Shane Keister – keyboards on "Stay for Awhile"
- Steve Schaffer – Synclavier programming on "Stay for Awhile"
- Dann Huff – guitars
- Nathan East – bass
- Paul Leim – drums
- Paulinho da Costa – percussion
- Richard Page – backing vocals on "Stay for Awhile"
- Gary Chapman – backing vocals on "Love Can Do"
- Greg X. Volz – backing vocals on "Love Can Do"
- Chris Harris – backing vocals on "Love Can Do"
- Mark Heimermann – backing vocals on "Love Can Do"

Production

- Executive producers – Michael Blanton, Dan Harrell and Gary Chapman
- Producer – Brown Bannister
- Co-Producer on "Stay for Awhile" and "Love Can Do" – John Potoker
- Engineers – Sabrina Buchanek, Ed Goodreau and John Potoker
- Additional Engineering – J.T. Cantwell, Spencer Chrislu and Steve McMillan
- Mixed by Sabrina Buchanek and Ed Goodreau at Blue Jay Recording (Carlisle, Massachusetts) and Larrabee Sound Studios (North Hollywood, California)
- Mastered by Doug Sax at The Mastering Lab (Hollywood, California)
- Art direction and design – Kent Hunter
- Photography – Mark Tucker

== Charts ==
=== Weekly charts ===
Year	Chart	Position
1986	The Billboard 200	66
1987	Top Contemporary Christian	1

=== End of year charts ===
Year	Chart	Position
1986	U.S. Billboard Inspirational Albums	21
1987	U.S. Billboard Inspirational Albums	2
1988	U.S. Billboard Inspirational Albums	1
1989	U.S. Billboard Inspirational Albums	10
1990	U.S. Billboard Inspirational Albums	8
1991	U.S. Billboard Inspirational Albums	13

=== End-of-decade charts ===
Chart (1980–1989)	Rank
US Billboard Top Contemporary Christian	1

== Certifications and sales ==
Region	Certification	Certified units/sales
United States (RIAA)	Platinum	1,000,000^{^}
^{^} Shipments figures based on certification alone.

== Accolades ==
GMA Dove Awards

Year	Winner	Category
1988	"Stay for Awhile"	Short Form Music Video of the Year
