= Wise Up =

Wise Up may refer to:

- "Wise Up", a song by Amy Grant from her 1985 album Unguarded
- "Wise Up", a song by Aimee Mann, originally from the Jerry Maguire soundtrack and used in the Magnolia soundtrack
- Wise Up (TV programme), a 1995–2000 British factual children's television programme broadcast on Channel 4
- Wise Up!, a 2006 album by The Hard Lessons
- WiseUp & Co., an American record label founded by hip hop artist Sylvan LaCue in 2015
