= In Concert Volume Two =

In Concert Volume Two may refer to:

- In Concert Volume Two (Amy Grant album)
- In Concert Volume Two (Freddie Hubbard & Stanley Turrentine album)

== See also ==
- In Concert (disambiguation)
