= Stay for Awhile =

Single by Amy Grant

from the album The Collection
- Released: 1986
- Genre: CCM, adult contemporary, pop
- Length: 5:37
- Label: A&M
- Songwriters: Amy Grant, Wayne Kirkpatrick, Michael W. Smith
- Producer: Brown Bannister

Amy Grant singles chronology
| "Sharayah" (1985) | "Stay for Awhile" (1986) | "The Next Time I Fall" (1986) |

Music video
- "Stay for Awhile" on YouTube

"Stay for Awhile" is a 1986 single by Christian singer Amy Grant, and was the first single from her album The Collection. Background vocals were provided by herself and her friend, Richard Page, lead singer for Mr. Mister at the time.

== Background ==
Throughout 1985 and 1986, Amy Grant was busy touring and promoting her successful pop-crossover album Unguarded. Previously she had been solely a CCM artist, but with the release of her single "Find a Way", she established herself as a credible name in mainstream music.

Even though she hardly had time for new recordings, she did manage to release the No. 1 pop single "The Next Time I Fall," which was a duet with Peter Cetera, and her record company issued a best-of compilation that covered her first ten years in the music industry.

== Personnel ==
- Amy Grant – lead and backing vocals
- Dann Huff – guitar
- Nathan East – bass
- Paul Leim – drums
- Paulinho Da Costa – percussion
- David Gamson - keyboards
- Michael W. Smith – keyboards
- Shane Keister – keyboards
- Robbie Buchanan – keyboards
- Steve Schaffer – Synclavier programming
- Richard Page – backing vocals

== Track listing ==
Remixes (featuring Tony Moran) - EP

1. Stay for Awhile (featuring Tony Moran) [Destination Radio Mix] - 3:38
2. Stay for Awhile (featuring Tony Moran) [Destination Mixshow Edit] - 6:38
3. Stay for Awhile (featuring Tony Moran) [Destination Club Anthem Remix] - 8:52
4. Stay for Awhile (featuring Tony Moran & Warren Rigg) [Radio Mix] - 4:08
5. Stay for Awhile (featuring Tony Moran & Warren Rigg) [Club Mix] - 9:00

Official versions

- Album version - 5:37
- Edited version - 3:43
- Promo version - 4:22
- Tony Moran & Warren Rigg club mix - 5:39
- Tony Moran & Warren Rigg radio edit - 4:08
- Tony Moran Destination Club anthem remix - 9:00
- Tony Moran Destination mixshow edit - 6:45
- Tony Moran Destination radio mix - 3:37

== Chart Success ==
In June 1986, The Collection was released in two separate LP and cassette versions, and "Stay for Awhile" was issued as its first single. Although there was a lack of promotion for both the album and the single, The Collection managed to top the Inspirational chart and "Stay for Awhile" topped the Christian radio chart and made the Top Twenty of the Adult Contemporary chart. "Stay for Awhile" paved the road to further pop radio success for Grant. Her next single, "The Next Time I Fall" became her first No. 1 pop song (following a long line of No. 1 songs on the Christian Music charts).

== Charts ==
| Year | Chart | Position |
|---|---|---|
| 1986 | Billboard Christian | 1 |
| 1986 | Adult Contemporary | 18 |

== Accolades ==
GMA Dove Awards

| Year | Winner | Category |
|---|---|---|
| 1988 | "Stay for Awhile" | Short Form Music Video of the Year |
