= 1974 (disambiguation) =

1974 was a common year starting on Tuesday of the Gregorian calendar. It may also refer to:

- 1974 (band), American rock band
- 1974 AD, Nepali rock band
- "1974 (We Were Young)", a song by Amy Grant
- "1974", a song on David Crosby's 2018 album Here If You Listen
- "1974" (Our Friends in the North), a TV episode
