= WOW Number 1s =

WOW #1s

Compilation album by Various artists
- Released: April 5, 2005
- Genre: Gospel, CCM
- Length: 130:06
- Label: Provident Label Group

WOW #1s compilation albums chronology
WOW #1s (2005)	WOW #1s: Yellow (2011)

Professional ratings
Review scores
Source	Rating
Allmusic	5/5 stars

WOW #1s is a two-disc compilation album of thirty one songs that have been heralded as the "Greatest Christian Music Hits Ever," with recordings dating from 1988 to 2005. It was released on April 5, 2005. The album features songs by FFH, Amy Grant, Rebecca St. James, Chris Rice, Avalon, and many other well-known singers and groups. It reached gold sales status in 2005. WOW #1s weighed in at 58th position on the Billboard 200 chart in 2005, and at No. 1 on the Top Christian Albums chart in both 2005 and 2006.

== Track listing ==
Disc one
No.	Title	Writer(s)	Artist (Album)	Length
1.	"Dive"	Steven Curtis Chapman	Steven Curtis Chapman (Speechless)	3:59
2.	"Holy"	Mark Hammond, Nichole Nordeman	Nichole Nordeman (Woven & Spun)	3:22
3.	"I Can Only Imagine"	Bart Millard	MercyMe (Almost There)	4:09
4.	"In Christ Alone"	Shawn Craig, Don Koch	Brian Littrell (Welcome Home)	3:41
5.	"One of These Days"	Jeromy Deibler	FFH (I Want to Be Like You)	4:25
6.	"Big Enough"	Chris Rice	Chris Rice (Past the Edges)	3:07
7.	"Lead Me On"	Amy Grant, Wayne Kirkpatrick, Michael W. Smith	Amy Grant (Lead Me On)	5:36
8.	"Place in This World"	Amy Grant, Wayne Kirkpatrick, Michael W. Smith	Michael W. Smith (Go West Young Man)	4:00
9.	"Gather at the River"	Regie Hamm, Joel Lindsey	Point of Grace (The Whole Truth)	3:27
10.	"Redeemer"	Nicole C. Mullen	Nicole C. Mullen (Nicole C. Mullen)	4:59
11.	"Testify to Love"	Paul Field, Ralph Van Manen, Henk Pool, Robert Riekerk	Avalon (A Maze of Grace)	4:46
12.	"Awesome God"	Rich Mullins	Rich Mullins (Winds of Heaven, Stuff of Earth)	3:06
13.	"On My Knees"	David Mullen, Nicole C. Mullen, Michael Ochs	Jaci Velasquez (Heavenly Place)	3:51
14.	"He's My Son"	Mark Schultz	Mark Schultz (Mark Schultz)	5:41
15.	"Live for You"	Chris Eaton, Chris Rodriguez	Rachael Lampa (Live for You)	3:58
16.	"Butterfly Kisses"	Bob Carlisle	Bob Carlisle (Butterfly Kisses (Shades of Grace))	5:38

Disc two
No.	Title	Writer(s)	Artist (Album)	Length
1.	"Flood"	Dan Haseltine, Charlie Lowell, Stephen Mason, Matt Odmark	Jars of Clay (Jars of Clay)	3:31
2.	"Kiss Me"	Matt Slocum	Sixpence None the Richer (Sixpence None the Richer)	3:28
3.	"If We Are the Body"	Mark Hall	Casting Crowns (Casting Crowns)	3:59
4.	"Undo Me"	Jennifer Knapp	Jennifer Knapp (Kansas)	3:25
5.	"Show Me Your Glory"	Mac Powell, Mark Lee, David Carr, Samuel Anderson, Brad Avery, Carey Byrd	Third Day (Come Together)	3:19
6.	"Jesus Freak"	Mark Heimermann, Toby McKeehan	dc Talk (Jesus Freak)	4:51
7.	"He Reigns"	Peter Furler	Newsboys (Adoration)	4:56
8.	"God of Wonders" (featuring Mac Powell, Cliff Young & Danielle Young)	Marc Byrd, Steve Hindalong	City On a Hill (City on a Hill: Songs of Worship and Praise)	5:10
9.	"I Still Believe"	Jeremy Camp	Jeremy Camp (Stay)	4:36
10.	"God"	Rebecca St. James	Rebecca St. James (God)	4:10
11.	"Stomp"	Kirk Franklin, Walter Morrison, Garry Shider, G. Clinton Jr.	Kirk Franklin (God's Property)	5:00
12.	"There You Go"	Aaron Tate	Caedmon's Call (40 Acres)	3:21
13.	"Open the Eyes of My Heart"	Paul Baloche	SONICFLOOd (Sonicflood)	5:10
14.	"Don't Look at Me"	Mark Heimermann, Stacie Orrico	Stacie Orrico (Genuine)	3:38
15.	"Big House"	Barry Blair, Bob Herdman, Will McGinniss, Mark Stuart	Audio Adrenaline (Don't Censor Me)	3:31

== Certifications ==
Region	Certification	Certified units/sales
United States (RIAA)	Gold	500,000^{^}
^{^} Shipments figures based on certification alone.

== See also ==
- WOW series
