= Everywhere I Go (Amy Grant song) =

Single by Amy Grant

from the album Unguarded
- Released: 1985
- Genre: CCM, Pop
- Length: 4:36
- Label: A&M, Word Records, EMI Records
- Songwriter: Mary Lee Kortes
- Producer: Brown Bannister

Amy Grant singles chronology
"Find a Way" (1985)	"Everywhere I Go" (1985)	"Wise Up" (1985)

"Everywhere I Go" is a 1985 single by Christian music singer Amy Grant. It was released as the second single from her Unguarded album. Unlike "Find a Way" before it and "Wise Up" after it, the song failed to reach The Billboard Hot 100. However, the song did make the Adult Contemporary and Christian music charts in the United States.

"Everywhere I Go" is a somewhat downtempo inspirational song that features heavy use of the synthesizer and some sound effects. The lyrics praise God's constant presence in Grant's life. In the Unguarded liner notes, Grant calls the song "my own version of Psalm 139."

== Background ==
The lead single from Unguarded was "Find A Way". That song went #1 on the Christian music charts, but also gave Grant her first hit on mainstream pop radio (as well as the first-ever Contemporary Christian music song to chart on mainstream pop radio). "Everywhere I Go" capitalized on Grant's newfound mainstream success and was released to both Christian and mainstream pop radio. The song's lyrics, however, are somewhat more explicit with respect to Grant's Christian faith than those of the other Unguarded singles, which may explain why "Everywhere I Go" did not perform quite as well on the mainstream charts. In 1986, Grant released her first compilation album, The Collection. Both "Find a Way" and "Everywhere I Go" were included, the only two songs from the still-new "Unguarded" to make the cut.

== Personnel ==
- Amy Grant – lead and backing vocals
- Shane Keister – Yamaha GS1, synthesizer programming
- Michael W. Smith – Memorymoog, Yamaha GS2
- Jon Goin – electric guitar
- Dann Huff – electric guitar
- Mike Brignardello – bass
- Paul Leim – drums
- Gary Chapman – backing vocals
- Diana Hanna – backing vocals

== Chart Success ==
Everywhere I Go performed well on Christian radio, peaking at #4 on the Christian music charts in the U.S. On mainstream radio, the single did not make The Billboard Hot 100; however, the song still achieved notable mainstream exposure. The single peaked at #28 on the mainstream Adult Contemporary chart.

== Cover versions ==
The song has been covered by several artists. Five Iron Frenzy notably released a punk rock version of the song on their 1997 album, Upbeats and Beatdowns.

== Charts ==
Chart (1985)	Peak position
US Adult Contemporary (Billboard)	28
