= Voice from Home =

Voice From Home

Studio album by FFH
- Released: December 12, 2005
- Recorded: Essential Records
- Studio: Dark Horse Recording (Franklin, Tennessee)
- Genre: CCM
- Length: 53:57
- Producer: Jeromy Deibler

FFH chronology
Still the Cross (2004)	Voice From Home (2005)	Worship in the Waiting (2007)

Voice From Home is an album from FFH. Their ninth album, it was released on December 12, 2005.

== Track listing ==
1. "The Only Hand You Need" (Jeromy Deibler) - 5:20
2. "Great Big Problem" (Jeromy Deibler, Mark Vogel) - 4:25
3. "Well Pleased" (Jeromy Deibler) - 3:56
4. "Can't Let Go" (Michael Boggs) - 3:47
5. "I Am Love" (Jeromy Deibler, Mark Vogel) - 5:00
6. "Worth It All" (Jeromy Deibler) - 4:54
7. "It's You" (Michael Boggs, Belinda Smith) - 3:25
8. "Through My Eyes" (Jeromy Deibler, Mark Vogel) - 5:07
9. "Grand Canyon" (Jeromy Deibler, Mark Vogel) - 4:29
10. "Take a Chance" (Michael Boggs) - 4:24
11. "Come Away" (Jeromy Deibler, Mark Vogel) - 5:26
12. "Listen" (Jeromy Deibler) - 3:38

== Personnel ==
FFH

- Michael Boggs
- Jennifer Deibler
- Jeromy Deibler
- Brian Smith

Additional musicians

- Mark Vogel – acoustic piano (8, 11)
- Matt Shockley – electric guitars (3)
- Kevin Perry – electric guitars (8)
- Tommy Magee – bass (8)
- Brian Barefoot – drums, percussion

== Production ==
- Robert Beeson – executive producer
- Conor Farley – executive producer
- Jeromy Deibler – producer
- Michael Modesto – engineer, mixing
- Harry Shaub – additional engineer, assistant engineer
- Christopher Biggs – mixing
- Barry Weeks – mixing, mastering
- Heather Hetzler – A&R production
- Stephanie McBrayer – art direction
- Tim Parker – art direction
- Robert Ascroft – photography
- Brady Wardlaw – hair stylist, make-up
- Morey Management – management
