= Have I Ever Told You =

Studio album by FFH
- Released: August 21, 2001
- Recorded: 2001
- Genre: CCM
- Length: 48:09
- Label: Essential Records
- Producer: Scott Williamson; David Hamilton

FFH chronology
Found a Place (2000)	Have I Ever Told You (2001)	Ready to Fly (2003)

Have I Ever Told You is the sixth studio album by FFH. The song "Open Up The Sky" was featured on the WOW Hits album for 2003. The album peaked at #119 on the Billboard 200.

== Track listing ==
1. "Watching Over Me" (Jeromy Deibler) - 3:05
2. "Fly Away" (Jeromy Deibler) - 3:59
3. "We Sing Alleluia" (Jeromy Deibler, Scott Williamson, Todd Young) - 4:25
4. "Jesus Speaks to Me" (Jeromy Deibler) - 3:14
5. "Astronaut" (Brad O'Donnell, Matt Kroeker) - 3:44
6. "Have I Ever Told You" (Jeromy Deibler) - 3:57
7. "I'm Amazed" (Jeromy Deibler) - 3:37
8. "Millionaire" (Michael Boggs) - 3:27
9. "Open Up The Sky" (Jeromy Deibler, Brian Smith) - 4:01
10. "Before It Was Said" (Jeromy Deibler, David Hamilton, Michael Boggs) - 5:28
11. "You Write the Words" (Jeromy Deibler) - 3:13
12. "On My Cross" (Jeromy Deibler) - 5:59

== Personnel ==
FFH

- Michael Boggs – vocals, acoustic guitar (1–3, 5, 7–10)
- Jennifer Deibler – vocals
- Jeromy Deibler – vocals, acoustic piano (11)
- Brian Smith – vocals, bass (11)

Musicians

- Jeff Roach – keyboards (1, 2, 4, 8)
- Byron Hagan – keyboards (3, 9), Hammond B3 organ (5, 11), acoustic piano (6)
- David Hamilton – Hammond B3 organ (7, 10), programming (7, 12), arrangements (7), acoustic piano (10, 12), string arrangements and conductor (10, 12)
- Jerry McPherson – electric guitars (1, 2, 4–6, 8, 11), dobro (2), acoustic guitar (4, 6)
- Greg Hagen – electric guitars (3, 9)
- Mark Baldwin – electric guitars (7), gut-string guitar (12)
- David Cleveland – electric guitars (7), acoustic guitar (7)
- Andrew Ramsey – electric guitars (7, 10), acoustic guitar (10)
- Mark Hill – bass (1–6, 8, 9)
- Matt Pierson – bass (7, 10)
- Craig Nelson – bass (12)
- Scott Williamson – drums (1, 2, 4, 6, 8, 11), drum programming (2, 6, 11), percussion (3), tambourine (5, 9), string arrangements (6)
- Steve Brewster – drums (3, 9), drum programming (9)
- Kent Hooper – drum programming (3)
- Miles McPherson – drums (5)
- John Hammond – drums (7, 10), programming (10)
- Eric Darken – percussion (7, 10, 12)
- Jonathan Yudkin – fiddle (7)
- Dave Williamson – string conductor (6, 11), string arrangements (11)
- Carl Gorodetzky – string contractor (6, 10, 11, 12)
- Kyle Hill – music preparation (6, 11)
- Ric Domenico – music preparation (10, 12)
- The Nashville String Machine – strings (6, 10–12)

Choir on "We Sing Alelulia"

- Jannell Els, Kyle Fenton, Lisa Fenton, Lori Johnson, Tony Johnson, Shane McConnell, Amanda Omartian, Chance Scoggins, Allyson Smith, Kara Tualatai Williamson, Dave Williamson and FFH.

== Production ==
- Robert Beeson – executive producer, art direction
- Bob Wohler – executive producer
- Hank Williams – mastering at MasterMix (Nashville, Tennessee)
- Michelle Pearson – A&R production
- Scott Hughes – art direction
- Jordyn Thomas – art direction
- Tim Parker – design
- Kristin Barlowe – photography
- Robin Geary – hair, make-up
- Chad Curry – stylist

=== Tracks 1–6, 8, 9 & 11 ===
- Scott Williamson – producer, overdub recording, vocal recording, track recording (3, 9)
- Todd Robbins – track recording (1, 2, 4–6, 8, 11)
- Kent Hooper – Pro Tools editing
- Philip Cooper – assistant engineer, additional Pro Tools engineer
- James Felver – assistant engineer
- J.C. Monterrosa – assistant engineer
- Ed Simonton – assistant engineer
- Todd Wells – assistant engineer
- Bob Williams – additional Pro Tools engineer
- Jerry Yoder – additional Pro Tools engineer
- Tom Laune – mixing (1, 3, 5, 8, 11)
- F. Reid Shippen – mixing (2, 4, 6, 9)
- Dan Shike – mix assistant (2, 4, 6, 9)
- Recorded at The Sound Kitchen (Franklin, Tennessee).
- Vocals and Overdubs recorded at Dark Horse Recording and Classic Recording Studios (Franklin, Tennessee).
- Pro Tools editing at House of Big Studio (Franklin, Tennessee).
- Mixed at Bridgeway Studios (Franklin, Tennessee) and Recording Arts (Nashville, Tennessee).

=== Tracks 7, 10 & 12 ===
- David Hamilton – producer, overdub recording, digital editing
- Bill Deaton – track recording, mixing
- Doug Sarrett – string recording
- David Streit – vocal recording, recording assistant
- Aaron Shannon – mix assistant
- Tracks and Vocals recorded at The Bennett House (Franklin, Tennessee).
- Overdubbed and digitally edited at HMP Studio (Brentwood, Tennessee).
- Strings recorded at Ocean Way Recording (Nashville, Tennessee).
- Mixed at Quad Studios (Nashville, Tennessee).
