= Ready to Fly (FFH album) =

Studio album by FFH
- Released: April 15, 2003
- Recorded: 2003
- Genre: Contemporary Christian
- Length: 45:50
- Label: Essential Records
- Producer: Scott Williamson; David Hamilton

FFH chronology
Have I Ever Told You (2001)	Ready to Fly (2003)	Still The Cross (2004)

Ready to Fly is the seventh studio album by contemporary Christian music group FFH. It was released on April 15, 2003. The album peaked at #89 on the Billboard 200 and #5 on Top Christian Albums.

== Track listing ==
1. "You Found Me" (Jeromy Deibler) - 3:35
2. "Good to be Free" (Jeromy Deibler) - 3:35
3. "It's a Good Day" (Michael Boggs, Tony Wood) - 3:55
4. "Ready to Fly" (Jeromy Deibler) - 4:04
5. "I'll Join the Rocks" (Jeromy Deibler) - 4:28
6. "Follow Love" (Jeromy Deibler, Scott Krippayne) - 4:36
7. "Never Gonna be Alone" (Jeromy Deibler) - 3:02
8. "Ready for a World" (Michael Boggs, Jeromy Deibler) - 4:00
9. "Waltz for Jennifer" (Jeromy Deibler) - 3:45
10. "His Love Goes On" (Michael Boggs) - 3:00
11. "If Not For Christ" (Jeromy Deibler) - 3:28
12. "Here I Am" (Michael Boggs) - 4:23

== Personnel ==
FFH

- Michael Boggs – vocals, acoustic guitar
- Jennifer Deibler – vocals
- Jeromy Deibler – vocals, acoustic piano
- Brian Smith – vocals, bass, trumpet

Additional musicians

- Byron Hagan – keyboards, acoustic piano, Hammond B3 organ
- David Hamilton – keyboards, programming, string arrangements and conductor
- Jeff Roach – keyboards, acoustic piano, synth bass
- Jim Hammerly – accordion
- Scott Williamson – keyboards, Wurlitzer electric piano, drums, drum programming, tambourine
- Lincoln Brewster – electric guitar
- David Cleveland – electric guitar
- Schuyler Duryee – electric guitar
- Jerry McPherson – acoustic guitar, electric guitar, bouzouki
- Andrew Ramsey – electric guitar
- Joey Canaday – bass
- Mark Hill – bass
- Matt Pierson – bass
- Jackie Street – bass
- Steve Brewster – drums
- John Hammond – drums
- Ken Lewis – percussion
- Dave Williamson – string arrangements and conductor
- The Nashville String Machine – strings
- Carl Gorodetzky – string contractor
- Ric Domenico – music preparation
- Kyle Hill – music preparation

== Production ==
- Bob Wohler – executive producer
- Jeromy Deibler – co-executive producer, liner notes
- Scott Williamson – producer (1–11), mixing
- David Hamilton – producer (12)
- Randy Poole – recording (1–11), overdub and vocal recording (1–11)
- Lincoln Brewster – overdub and vocal recording (1–11)
- Brent King – string recording (1–11)
- Bill Deaton – recording (12), mixing (12), string recording (12)
- David Streit – vocal recording (12)
- Jerry Yoder – recording
- Todd Robbins – mixing
- Shane D. Wilson – mixing
- Drew Bollman – assistant engineer
- Phil Cooper – assistant engineer
- Chris Henning – assistant engineer
- John Lawry – assistant engineer
- Michael Modesto – assistant engineer
- Aaron Shannon – assistant engineer
- Jeff Spence – assistant engineer
- John Mayfield – mastering
- Michelle Pearson – A&R production
- Tim Parker – art direction
- Jordyn Thomas – art direction
- Ben Joyner – design
- Rusty Mitchell – cover design
- Russ Harrington – photography
- Melissa Schleicher – hair stylist, make-up
- Mike Atkins Management – management

Studios

- Recorded at Dark Horse Recording Studio, The Carpal Tunnel, The Border, The Sound Kitchen and The Bennett House (Franklin, Tennessee); HMP Studio (Brentwood, Tennessee); Ocean Way (Nashville, Tennessee); Linc's Crib (Roseville, California).
- Mixed at Pentavarit and Quad Studios (Nashville, Tennessee); The Carpal Tunnel and The Border.
- Mastered at Mayfield Mastering (Nashville, Tennessee).
