= Lead Me On (Amy Grant album) =

Studio album by Amy Grant
- Released: June 28, 1988
- Recorded: 1987–88
- Studios: The Bennett House and The Castle (Franklin, Tennessee); Digital Recorders and Emerald Sound Studios (Nashville, Tennessee); Buchanan House (Vancouver, Canada); Riverstone Farm (Riverstone, Texas); A&M Studios (Hollywood, California); Lion Share Studios (Los Angeles, California)
- Genre: Contemporary Christian music
- Length: 59:35
- Labels: Myrrh, A&M
- Producer: Brown Bannister

Amy Grant chronology
The Animals' Christmas (1986)	Lead Me On (1988)	Heart in Motion (1991)

Alternative cover
- 20th Anniversary Edition cover

Singles from Lead Me On
- 1. "Saved by Love" Released: 1988; 2. "Lead Me On" Released: 1988; 3. "1974 (We Were Young)" Released: 1988; 4. "What About the Love" Released: 1988; 5. "Say Once More" Released: 1988; 6. "Faithless Heart" Released: 1988

Professional ratings
Review scores
Source	Rating
AllMusic	4.5/5 stars

Lead Me On is the eighth studio album by Christian music singer-songwriter Amy Grant, released in 1988 through A&M Recordings.

Lead Me On was a departure from its predecessor, the high-energy pop album Unguarded. Unlike Unguarded or 1991's Heart in Motion, Lead Me On was not as mainstream compatible. Only three of its songs earned mainstream airplay, all of them insignificantly (the title song charted for two weeks on the Billboard Hot 100, reaching No. 96, and "Saved by Love" and "1974 (We Were Young)" made the Adult Contemporary chart in minor positions). Christian music circles, however, praised the album. It would later be named the No. 1 Christian album in CCM Magazine's 2001 book The 100 Greatest Albums in Christian Music. The title song was featured in WOW #1s: 31 of the Greatest Christian Music Hits Ever.

== Anniversary release ==
EMI / Sparrow Records released a double-disc 20th Anniversary Edition of the album on June 24, 2008. The first disc contains EMI's digitally remastered version of the complete original album. The second disc contains new acoustic recordings of songs from the original album, which Grant has described as "songwriter versions" that are stripped down to emphasize the lyrics. Several of these tracks feature special guests. Additionally, the 20th Anniversary Edition includes previously unreleased live recordings from the large-scale Lead Me On Tour and a short interview with Amy Grant about the original album. The discs are packaged with a previously unseen booklet of pictures and liner notes from Grant. The iTunes release includes the music video for "Lead Me On".

In support of the 20th Anniversary Edition, Grant recreated the original Lead Me On tour in 20 cities, starting in October 2008. Most of the original tour's band reunited for the anniversary tour. The reissue and anniversary tour were also supported by TV specials, radio specials, and promotional appearances.

== Track listing ==
No.	Title	Writer(s)	Length
1.	"1974 (We Were Young)"	Amy Grant, Gary Chapman, Jerry McPherson	4:22
2.	"Lead Me On"	Grant, Wayne Kirkpatrick, Michael W. Smith	5:35
3.	"Shadows"	Grant, Karen Peris, Don Peris	5:24
4.	"Saved by Love"	Grant, Justin Peters, Chris Smith	4:38
5.	"Faithless Heart"	Grant, Michael W. Smith	5:10
6.	"What About the Love"	Rhonda Fleming, Janis Ian	5:23
7.	"If These Walls Could Speak"	Jimmy Webb	5:42
8.	"All Right"	Grant, Dann Huff, Phil Naish	4:23
9.	"Wait for the Healing*"	Grant, Chapman, Kirkpatrick, McPherson	5:36
10.	"Sure Enough"	Mike Brignardello, Shane Keister, Kirkpatrick	4:00
11.	"If You Have To Go Away*"	Grant, McPherson	4:01
12.	"Say Once More**"	Grant, Gardner Cole	4:54

20th Anniversary Edition bonus disc
No.	Title	Length
1.	"Lead Me On"	4:40
2.	"Introduction to Faithless Heart (Amy and Michael W. Smith)"	0:33
3.	"Faithless Heart (Acoustic)"	3:51
4.	"Say Once More (Acoustic)"	3:49
5.	"Wait for the Healing (Live)"	6:01
6.	"Shadows (Live)"	5:26
7.	"All Right (Live)"	5:22
8.	"Piano Intro (Michael W. Smith)"	1:51
9.	"Lead Me On (Live)"	6:27
10.	"Quite a Change (Interview)"	1:41
11.	"The Great Balancing Act (Interview)"	1:46
12.	"Seasons (Interview)"	1:19
13.	"Wait for the Healing (Interview)"	1:01
14.	"Looking Back (Interview)"	0:44

* Bonus Track on CD version
** This song is different from the one with the same name on Grant's 1980 Never Alone release.

The release was promoted in the US by the record company (Myrrh/Word Incorporated, Waco Texas) by issue of a unique promotional CD. The gold picture CD was hand numbered and autographed by Amy herself and was limited to 4150 copies (catalogue number 9016656472).

== Personnel ==
Musicians

- Amy Grant – vocals
- Robbie Buchanan – keyboards (1, 3, 6, 9–11), acoustic piano (4)
- Alan Pasqua – keyboards (1–3, 6, 9, 11, 12)
- Michael W. Smith – keyboards (2)
- Benmont Tench – Hammond B3 organ (2, 4, 8, 12)
- Shane Keister – keyboards (3, 8–10), Hammond B3 organ (5), acoustic piano (7)
- Carl Marsh – keyboards (6), arco bass (7)
- Brett Perry – Synclavier (12)
- Keith Thomas – Synclavier (12), keyboards (12)
- Jerry McPherson – electric guitar (1), zither (1), guitars (2–4, 6, 8–11)
- Dann Huff – 12-string guitar (1, 11), guitars (2–6, 8–10, 12), guitar solo (3, 8, 10)
- Gary Chapman – acoustic guitar (4, 6)
- Chris Rodriguez – guitars (10)
- Mark O'Connor – mandolin (4), viola (7), violin (9)
- Mike Brignardello – bass (1–6, 8–11)
- Jimmie Lee Sloas – bass (12)
- Paul Leim – drums (1, 2, 4–6, 8, 10, 11)
- Keith Edwards – drums (3, 9)
- Lenny Castro – percussion (1, 3, 6, 10, 12), tambourine (11)
- John Darnall – string arrangements (7)

Background vocalists

- Amy Grant – backing vocals (1, 4, 5)
- Bill Champlin – backing vocals (2, 8)
- Tommy Funderburk – backing vocals (2)
- Chris Harris – backing vocals (3, 8–10)
- Wayne Kirkpatrick – backing vocals (3, 8–10, 12)
- Chris Rodriguez – backing vocals (3, 8–10)
- Diana DeWitt – backing vocals (3, 10, 11)
- Mary Ann Kennedy – backing vocals (5, 6)
- Pam Rose – backing vocals (5, 6)
- Gary Chapman – backing vocals (8)
- Chris Eaton – backing vocals (8, 10)
- Donna McElroy – backing vocals (8)
- Dave Perkins – backing vocals (8)
- Randy Stonehill – backing vocals (8)
- Russ Taff – backing vocals (8)
- Carmen Twillie – backing vocals (8)

== Production ==
- David Anderle – executive producer
- Michael Blanton – executive producer
- Gary Chapman – executive producer
- Brown Bannister – producer
- Jeff Balding – engineer, mixing (5, 7)
- Marc DeSisto – mixing (1, 3, 4, 6, 8–11)
- Shelly Yakus – mixing (1–4, 6, 8, 10)
- Johnny Potoker – mixing (5)
- Steve MacMillan – mixing (12)
- Claude Achille – assistant engineer
- Jeff Coppage – assistant engineer
- Ron Jacobs – assistant engineer
- Laura Livingston – assistant engineer
- Mark McKenna – assistant engineer
- Paula Montondo – assistant engineer
- Mark Nevers – assistant engineer
- Keith Odle – assistant engineer
- Brian Scheuble – assistant engineer
- Bob Vogt – assistant engineer
- Bill Whittington – assistant engineer
- Randall J. Wine – assistant engineer
- Bob Ludwig – mastering at Masterdisk (New York City, New York)
- Fran Kirkpatrick – production coordinator
- Kimberly Smith – production coordinator
- Richard Frankel – art direction
- Melanie Nissen – design
- Eika Aoshima – photography
- Ed James – merchandising

== Charts ==
=== Weekly charts ===
Chart performance for Lead Me On
Chart (1988)	Peak position
US Billboard 200	71
US Top Christian Albums (Billboard)	1

=== End of year charts ===
Year	Chart	Position
1988	US Billboard Top Contemporary Christian	9
1989	US Billboard Top Contemporary Christian	1
1990	US Billboard Top Contemporary Christian	19

=== End-of-decade charts ===
Chart (1980–1989)	Rank
US Billboard Top Contemporary Christian	7

== Certifications and sales ==
Region	Certification	Certified units/sales
Canada (Music Canada)	Gold	50,000^{^}
United States (RIAA)	Gold	500,000^{^}
^{^} Shipments figures based on certification alone.

== Accolades ==
Grammy Awards

Year	Winner	Category
1989	Lead Me On	Best Gospel Performance, Female

GMA Dove Awards

Year	Winner	Category
1989	Lead Me On	Pop/Contemporary Album of the Year
1989	"Lead Me On"	Short Form Music Video of the Year
