= Lloyd Noble Center =

Arena in Norman, Oklahoma, US

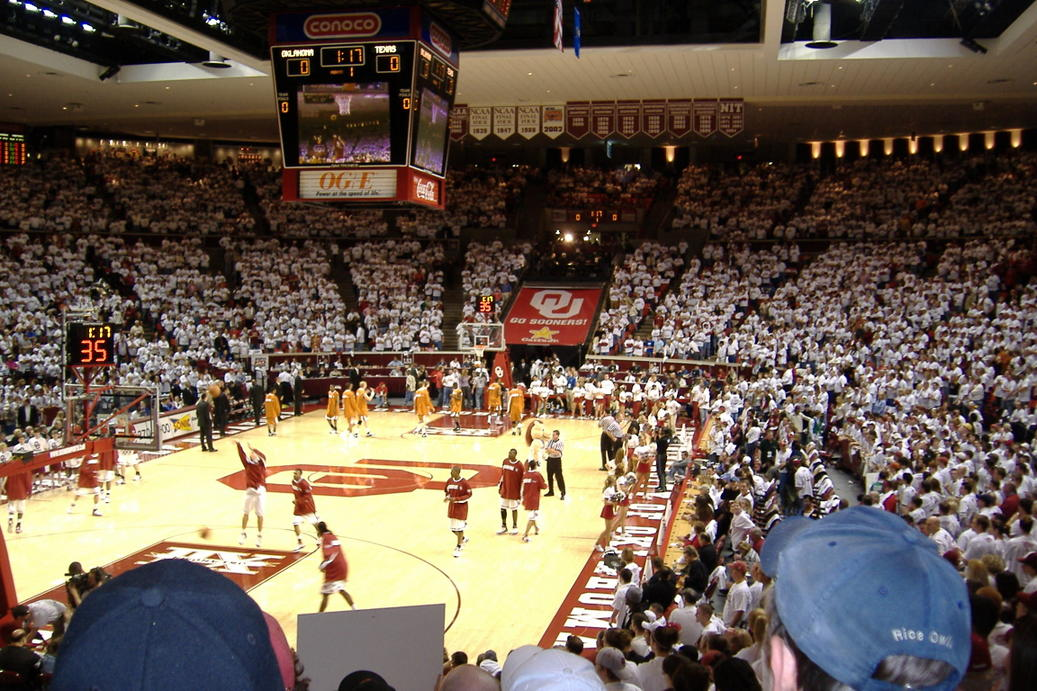
- The Oklahoma Sooners men's basketball team warms up before a game against the Texas Longhorns
- Interactive map of Lloyd Noble Center
- Location: 2900 Jenkins Avenue; Norman, Oklahoma, 73072
- Coordinates: 35°11′15″N 97°26′40″W
- Owner: University of Oklahoma
- Operator: University of Oklahoma
- Capacity: 10,967 (2020-Present); 11,562 (2013–2019); 12,000 (2001–2013); 11,100 (1994–2001); 10,871 (1975–1994)
- Surface: Multi-surface

Construction
- Groundbreaking: 1973
- Opened: October 27, 1975
- Renovated: 2001, 2018, 2023
- Cost: $6 million ($35.9 million in 2025 dollars) $17.1 million (2001 renovation) $7 million (2018 Griffin addition) $9.5 million (2023 renovation)
- Architects: Sorey, Hill & Sorey; Ellerbe Becket (renovations)

Tenant
- Oklahoma Sooners (NCAA DI) (1975–present)

The Lloyd Noble Center is a 10,967-seat multi-purpose arena located in Norman, Oklahoma, some 19 mi (31 km) south of downtown Oklahoma City. It opened in 1975 and is home to the University of Oklahoma men's and women's basketball and women's gymnastics teams of the Southeastern Conference. It also regularly hosts concerts, including city school orchestra concerts, and graduation ceremonies for colleges within the University of Oklahoma as well as those for several high schools in the area.

== History ==
Before the construction of the facility, the teams played in the much smaller OU Field House, now known as McCasland Field House, located on campus near Oklahoma Memorial Stadium. The success of Sooner basketball teams in the early 1970s including star forward Alvan Adams, motivated the building of a larger, state-of-the-art, arena, the Lloyd Noble Center (LNC), which was built in 1973-75 at a cost of $6 Million.

The center is named after Samuel Lloyd Noble (1896–1950), a Houston oilman and philanthropist, and founder of the Noble Corporation and the Samuel Roberts Noble Foundation. Noble is an OU alumnus and former member of the OU Board of Regents; his foundation provided OU's first ever $1 million gift to finance the center.

The Sooners frequently sold out the arena during the Coach Billy Tubbs era, with All-American forward Wayman Tisdale leading the high-scoring team to several Big Eight Conference titles and NCAA Tournament appearances. This led to the popular colloquialism around Norman that Lloyd Noble Center is "the house that Alvan built and Wayman filled." Other notable basketball stars who played at the LNC include Mookie Blaylock, Stacey King, Blake Griffin, Buddy Hield and Trae Young, all of whom also played in the NBA, as well as Stacey Dales, Courtney Paris and Danielle Robinson, who went on to play in the WNBA.

The LNC has hosted NIT men's basketball games and NCAA Women's Basketball Tournament Opening Round games, NCAA Women's Gymnastics Regional and National Semifinal competitions, an NCAA Wrestling Championship, as well as one NBA game. In January 2006, the NBA and the New Orleans Hornets decided to move two games from the Pete Maravich Assembly Center in Baton Rouge to Oklahoma City due to the devastation of Hurricane Katrina and the subsequent low attendance it caused. The Ford Center in Oklahoma City was unavailable for one of the games against the Sacramento Kings, so it was played in the Lloyd Noble Center.

OU and OU Athletics donors have made several investments in the arena over the years to update it, including a $17.1 M renovation in 2001, the addition of the $7 M 18,000 sq ft Griffin Family Performance Center in 2018, and extensive expansion and modernization of the men's and women's basketball locker rooms, offices and meeting facilities, updated video and sound systems, and renovated concourse amenities in 2023 ($9.5 M).

During a men's basketball game on February 14, 2026, a popcorn machine caught fire inside the arena, leading to evacuations and a game delay.

== Facilities Description ==
For sports the LNC can seat 11,700, but with standing room tickets the attendance has sometimes swelled to 12,000. As a concert venue, the Lloyd Noble Center can hold between 2,848 and 4,516 in a theater set-up, 6,165 for end-stage concerts, and 11,238 for center-stage concerts. The arena contains 18,000 sq ft (1,700 m^{2}) of arena floor space as well as 22,534 sq ft (2,093.5 m^{2}) of concourse space, allowing for trade shows to be held at the arena. The arena stands only 51 ft (16 m) tall since the majority of the structure is under ground (including the entire lower arena level), and contains a 40 by 60 ft (12 by 18 m) portable stage and a state-of-the-art scoreboard and video systems that were updated in 2023. There are 12 concession stands on the concourse.

== Concerts ==
Numerous concerts have been held in the Lloyd Noble Center, and the arena was particularly popular for that in its first ten years. Then, with increased competition from Oklahoma City venues, such as the Myriad/Cox Arena, Ford/Chesapeake/Paycom Center, Jim Norick Arena, Zoo Amphitheater, and Gaming Casinos statewide, the number of musical acts has diminished to just a few per year.

Some of the notable musicians and bands that have performed at the LNC include Elvis Presley performing two back-to-back concerts at the center on March 25 & 26 1977, The Grateful Dead on October 11, 1977, U2 on June 10, 1983, and Journey Frontiers Tour for three dates in July, 1983, returning in 1998. Amy Grant recorded half of her live albums, In Concert and In Concert Volume Two, at the LNC.

== See also ==
- List of NCAA Division I basketball arenas
