= Found a Place =

Studio album by FFH
- Released: March 7, 2000
- Recorded: 2000
- Genre: Contemporary Christian
- Length: 42:17
- Label: Essential Records
- Producer: Scott Williamson

FFH chronology
I Want to Be Like You (1999)	Found a Place (2000)	Have I Ever Told You (2001)

Found A Place is the fifth studio album by FFH. The album peaked at #154 on the Billboard 200.

== Track listing ==
1. "When I Praise" (Jeromy Deibler) - 3:48
2. "Found a Place" (Michael Boggs) - 3:36
3. "Why Do I" (Jeromy Deibler) - 4:37
4. "Lord Move, or Move Me" (Jeromy Deibler) - 5:00
5. "Daniel" (Michael Boggs) - 3:16
6. "Your Love is Life to Me" (Jeromy Deibler, Tony Wood) - 3:36
7. "Because of Who You Are" (Jeromy Deibler) - 3:30
8. "Be My Glory" (Dukes Jason Cristoffer) - 3:02
9. "I'm Not Afraid to Love You" (Jeromy Deibler, Tony Wood) - 4:03
10. "It's Been a Long Time" (Jeromy Deibler) - 4:03
11. "Every Now and Then" (Jeromy Deibler, Michael Boggs) - 4:36

== Personnel ==
FFH

- Jeromy Deibler – vocals
- Jennifer Deibler – vocals
- Brian Smith – vocals
- Michael Boggs – vocals, acoustic guitar

Musicians

- Jeffrey Roach – keyboards (1)
- Bryon Hagan – keyboards (2–11)
- Glenn Pearce – electric guitars (1–7, 9–11), acoustic guitar (3)
- Jerry McPherson – additional electric guitar (1), electric guitars (8)
- David Cleveland – acoustic guitar (6)
- Matt Pierson – bass (1, 8)
- Craig Young – bass (2–7, 9–11)
- Scott Williamson – drums, percussion (1–10)
- Steve Brewster – additional drums (8)
- Eric Darken – percussion (11)
- Dave Williamson – string arrangements (4)
- Carl Gorodetzky – string contractor (4)
- The Nashville String Machine – strings (4)
- John Catchings – cello (11)

Handclaps on "Be My Glory"

- Christine Amerman, Katie Kelsey, Brittany Mitchell, Jameson Reeder, Allyson Smith and FFH.

== Production ==
- Executive Producers – Robert Beeson and Bob Wohler
- Producer – Scott Williamson
- Engineers – Jullian Kindred, Randy Poole and Salvo.
- Vocals and Overdubs recorded by Scott Williamson
- Additional Engineers – Kent Hooper and Doug Sarrett
- Assistant Engineers – Robert "Void" Caprio, Alex Chan, Grant Cibula, Mike Elsner, Scott Giles, Grant Greene, Rick Hackley, Carissa Kaberline, Alan Litten and Chris Mara.
- Recorded at Bulldog Studio (Franklin, TN); Uno Mas Studio (Brentwood, TN); Quad Studios (Nashville, TN).
- Tracks 1–4, 7, 9 & 10 mixed by Tom Laune at Bridgeway Studios (Nashville, TN).
- Tracks 5, 6, 8 & 11 mixed by Salvo at Recording Arts (Nashville, TN).
- Mastered by Hank Williams at MasterMix (Nashville, TN).
- A&R Administration – Michelle Pearson
- Artist Development – Jordyn Thomas
- Art Direction – Nina Williams
- Design – Michelle Kapp at Axis Media.
- Photography – Tony Baker
- Stylist – Chad Curry
- Hair and Makeup – Melissa Schleicher
