= Concert program =

Selection of pieces to be performed at a concert

A concert program (in American English) or concert programme (in British English) is a selection and ordering, or programming, of pieces to be performed at an occasion, or concert. Concert programs can be organized into a booklet. In some occasions the programs might be simpler, and will be put on a piece of paper. Programs may be influenced by the available ensemble of instruments, by performer ability or skill, by theme (historical, programmatic, or technical), by musical concerns (such as form), or by allowable time. For example, a brass ensemble may perform an "all brass" program, the pieces of which may be chosen by a theme, such as "all Bach", and the chosen pieces may be ordered so that they build in intensity as the concert progresses. Concert programs may be put together by ensembles, conductors, or ensemble directors, and are often explained in program notes. The structure of modern concert programs can be traced back to the contributions of Felix Mendelssohn while he was director of the Gewandhausorchester in Leipzig. Mendelssohn's programming style consists of an overture (or other short work), a concerto or suite, an intermission, and then a larger work such as a symphony or operatic movement.

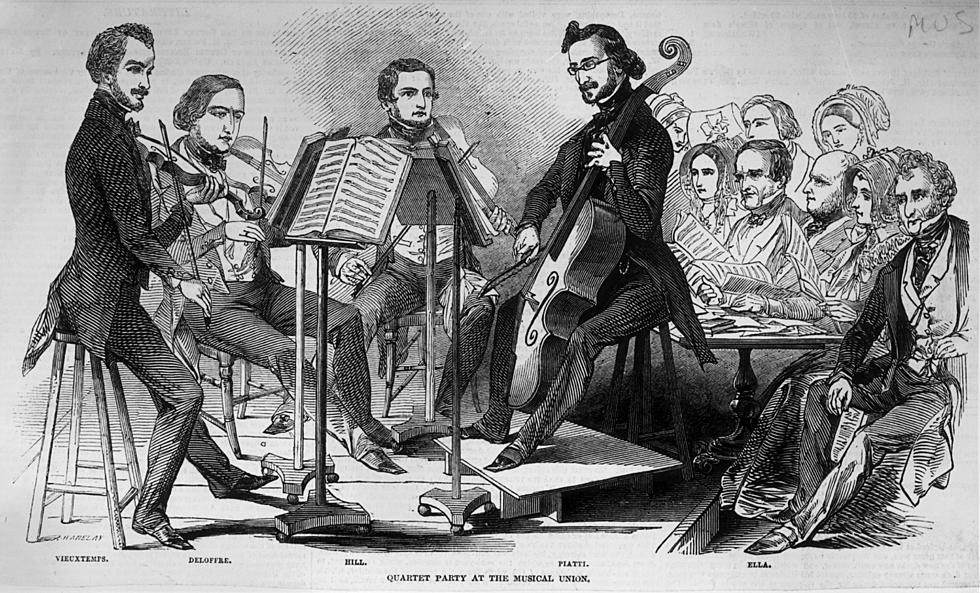
1846 concert showing audience with program notes

Program notes or annotated concert programs are common where contemporary or classical music is being performed. These were introduced in Edinburgh and London in the 1840s, first for chamber music concerts, notably by John Ella and his Musical Union, under the name "Synoptical Analysis". They became common in symphony concerts in the 1850s. In 1862, the Viennese critic Eduard Hanslick considered this particularly necessary for the English middle class: "Feeling usually uncertain about things aesthetic, the English listener loves direct instruction." Program notes arrived later in continental Europe.

With his program notes for the Saturday Concerts at the Crystal Palace, [George] Grove created a model for the concert culture of the second half of the century in Britain and abroad. He personified what was considered a musical guide for his Victorian contemporaries.

— — Christian Thorau, 2019

Program notes serve two purposes: to provide historical and background information on the piece, and to give the audience some sense of what to expect, providing what to listen for during the concert. Also provided, if necessary, is information about the conductor and performers of the ensembles, and especially featured soloists. With the presentation of contemporary pieces, it is common to include notes provided by the composer. Program notes may include information about, and quotes or commentary from, the composer, conductor, or performers, as well as provide context regarding the musical era. Programs may also include information about the programmatic or absolute content of the music, including analysis, and may point out details such as themes, musical motifs, and sections or movements.

== See also ==
- Commission (music)
- Dedication (art)
- In Concert (disambiguation)
- Premiere
- Program music
