= In Concert =

In Concert may refer to:

== Albums ==
- In Concert (Ahmad Jamal album), 1981
- In Concert (1985 America album)
- In Concert (1995 America album)
- In Concert (Amy Grant album), 1981
- In Concert (Apo Hiking Society album), 1974
- In Concert (Blood, Sweat & Tears album), 1976
- In Concert (Carole King album), 1994
- In Concert (Chet Baker and Lee Konitz album), 1982
- In Concert, by Cinderella, reissue title of Live at the Key Club, 1999
- In Concert (Dave Burrell and David Murray album), 1991
- In Concert (Dead Can Dance album), 2013
- In Concert (Derek and the Dominos album), 1973
- In Concert (The Doors album), 1991
- In Concert (The Dubliners album), 1965
- In Concert (iamamiwhoami album), 2010
- In Concert (Janis Joplin album), 1972
- In Concert (Jethro Tull album), 1995
- In Concert (John Hicks album), 1986
- In Concert (Kenny Drew album), 1979
- In Concert (Miles Davis album), 1973
- In Concert (Oregon album), 1975
- In Concert (Peter, Paul and Mary album), 1964
- In Concert (Rockapella album), 2001
- In Concert (Sérgio Mendes album), 1969
- In Concert (Sherbet album), 1975
- In Concert 1972, by Ravi Shankar and Ali Akbar Khan, 1973
- In Concert 1987: Abigail, by King Diamond, 1991
- In Concert at the Outpost Performance Space, Albuquerque 2004, by Kenny Davern, 2005
- In Concert at the Troubadour, 1969, an album by Rick Nelson, 1970
- In Concert on Broadway, by Harry Connick Jr., 2011
- In Concert with The London Symphony Orchestra, 2000
- In Concert, November 1975 (Richard & Linda Thompson album), 2007
- In Concert, Zürich, October 28, 1979, by Chick Corea, 1980
- In Concert – Brandeis University 1963, by Bob Dylan, 2011
- In Concert-Carnegie Hall, by George Benson, 1976
- In Concert – Live at Sibelius Hall, by Tarja Turunen & Harus, 2011
- In Concert: A Benefit for the Crossroads Centre at Antigua, by Eric Clapton & Friends, 1999
- In Concert: Merchants of Cool, by Bad Company, 2002
- In Concert: The Party's Just Begun Tour, by the Cheetah Girls, 2007
- In Concert/MTV Plugged, by Bruce Springsteen, 1993

=== Similar titles ===
- The Beach Boys in Concert, 1973
- David Gilmour in Concert, 2002
- Deep Purple in Concert, 1980
- Donovan in Concert, 1968
- Rising (Donovan album), 1990; released as Donovan in Concert, 1994
- Emerson, Lake & Palmer in Concert, 1979
- In Concert Volume Two (Amy Grant album), 1981
- In Concert Volume Two (Freddie Hubbard & Stanley Turrentine album), 1973
- Strawbs in Concert
- Jane Olivor in Concert, by Jane Olivor, 1982

== Television ==
- In Concert (British TV series), a 1970 BBC music series
- In Concert (American TV series), a 1972 late-night music program
- In Concert (Canadian TV series), a 1981 music concert series
- "In Concert" (WKRP in Cincinnati), an episode

== Other uses ==
- In Concert, a CBC Radio 2 classical music program
- In Concert, a 1989 book by Carl Vigeland
- In Concert 1980, a 1980 concert tour by Mike Oldfield
