= Still the Cross =

Studio album by FFH
- Released: September 28, 2004
- Genre: Contemporary Christian music
- Length: 40:09
- Label: Essential
- Producer: Scott Williamson; Mark Miller

FFH chronology
Ready to Fly (2003)	Still the Cross (2004)	Voice From Home (2005)

Professional ratings
Review scores
Source	Rating
Jesus Freak Hideout	(?)

Still the Cross is the eighth album by Contemporary Christian music group FFH. It was released on September 14, 2004. The album peaked at #10 on the Billboard Hot Christian Albums.

== Track listing ==
1. "You Drive I'll Ride" (Jeromy Deibler, Brian Smith) - 3:56
2. "You Love Me Anyway" (Deibler, Smith) - 4:30
3. "Without You" (Deibler, Michael Boggs, Aaron Benward) - 3:35
4. "Still the Cross" (Deibler, Donna Smith, Scott Williamson) - 5:03
5. "You and Only You" (Deibler, Boggs) - 3:36
6. "The Long Haul" (Deibler) - 4:11
7. "In This Moment" (Boggs, Johnathan Crumpton, Tony Wood) - 3:46
8. "Cover Me" (Deibler, Smith, Trent Dilfer) - 4:10
9. "All Part of the Walk" (Deibler, Smith) - 3:49
10. "Another Day With You" (Boggs) - 3:34

== Personnel ==
FFH

- Michael Boggs – guitars, backing vocals
- Jennifer Deibler – lead vocals, backing vocals
- Jeromy Deibler – lead vocals, acoustic piano, guitars
- Brian Smith – bass, backing vocals

Musicians

- Byron Hagan – keyboards, bar room piano, Hammond B3 organ
- Blair Masters – keyboards, Hammond B3 organ
- Jeff Roach – programming
- Scott Williamson – keyboard and bass programming, drums, percussion, tambourine, drum programming, string arrangements (4, 6)
- Mark Baldwin – electric guitar
- Lincoln Brewster – electric guitar
- Greg Hagan – acoustic guitar, electric guitar
- Jerry McPherson – electric guitar
- Dale Oliver – acoustic guitar, electric guitar, mandolin
- Joey Canaday – bass
- Jason Trimble – drums
- Mark Douthit – saxophones (2)
- Chris McDonald – trombone (2), brass arrangements (2)
- Jeff Bailey – trumpet (2)
- Mike Haynes – trumpet (2)
- Dave Williamson – string arrangements (8)
- Carl Gorodetzky – string contractor (4, 6, 8)
- The Nashville String Machine – strings (4, 6, 8)

Choir on "Still The Cross"

- Craig Adams – director and conductor
- Craig Adams, Julie Balcom, Dorinda Boggs, Ryan Brewer, Ariana Bryant, Lesley Caraway, Marvin Copaus, Angela Garrison, Kacy Holman, Pamela Kelly, Marissa Murphy, Dean Newkirk, Shanda Perkins, Kim Shrum and Vicki Willis – choir singers

== Production ==
- Bob Wohler – executive producer
- Jeromy Deibler – co-executive producer
- John Mayfield – mastering at Mayfield Mastering (Nashville, Tennessee)
- Michelle Pearson – A&R production
- Tim Parker – art direction, design, cross photography
- Andrew Southam – photography
- Ron Roark – cross photography
- Mike Atkins Entertainment – management

=== Tracks 1, 2, 4–6, 8 & 9 ===
- Scott Williamson – producer, band track recording, overdub recording, vocal recording
- Randy Poole – band track recording, mixing (4, 5)
- Todd Robbins – band track recording, mixing (1, 2, 8)
- Brent King – string recording (4, 6, 8)
- Shane D. Wilson – mixing (6, 9)
- Lincoln Brewster – additional recording
- Philip Cooper – assistant engineer
- Chris Henning – assistant engineer
- Michael Modesto – assistant engineer
- Kevin Pickle – assistant engineer
- Erik Tonkin – assistant engineer
- Garrett Williamson – assistant engineer
- Recorded at Dark Horse Recording, The Carpel Tunnel, The Sound Kitchen and Classic Recording Studios (Franklin, Tennessee); OmniSound Studios (Nashville, Tennessee); Linc's Crib (Roseville, California).
- Mixed at John Lawry's Studio and The Poole Room (Franklin, Tennessee); Pentavarit (Nashville, Tennessee).

=== Tracks 3, 7 & 10 ===
- Mark Miller – producer
- Sam Hewitt – recording, mixing
- Recorded and Mixed at Zoo Studios (Franklin, Tennessee).

== Awards ==
On 2005, the title song was nominated for a Dove Award for Inspirational Recorded Song of the Year at the 36th GMA Dove Awards.
