= Gasoline (The Hard Lessons album) =

Album by the band The Hard Lessons

Studio album by the Hard Lessons
- Released: May 28, 2005
- Genre: Indie rock
- Label: No Fun Records
- Producer: Zach Shipps; Jim Diamond

The Hard Lessons chronology
Rock N' Soul (2003)	Gasoline (2005)	Wise Up! (2006)

Professional ratings
Review scores
Source	Rating
Allmusic	link
Metro Times	(not rated)
PopMatters	link

Gasoline is an album by indie rock group the Hard Lessons, released by No Fun Records on May 28, 2005 (see 2005 in music). It was received with generally favorable reviews.

== Track listing ==
1. "Feel Alright" - 3:58
2. "Milk and Sugar" - 4:28
3. "That Other Girl" - 3:22
4. "Share Your Vanity" - 2:11
5. "All Over This Town" - 3:52
6. "Stop! Stop! Stop!" - 2:26
7. "Feedback Loop" - 2:55
8. "Inspired/Admired" - 2:35
9. "How It Is With Me" - 2:48
10. "I Can't Stand It" - 3:26
11. "Love Gone Cold" - 4:15
