= More Like a Lion =

Studio album by Michael Boggs
- Released: March 25, 2014
- Genres: Worship, CCM, Christian rock, Christian alternative rock, country gospel, pop rock
- Length: 49:11
- Label: Stylos

Michael Boggs chronology
| More Than Moved (2010) | More Like a Lion (2014) |

More Like a Lion is the second studio album by Michael Boggs, released on March 25, 2014, by Stylos Records.

== Critical reception ==
Professional ratings
Review scores
| Source | Rating |
|---|---|
| 365 Days of Inspiring Media | 4/5 stars |
| CCM Magazine | 4/5 stars |
| Christian Music Review | 4/5 stars |
| Cross Rhythms | 10/10 squares |
| Indie Vision Music | 4/5 stars |
| Louder Than the Music | 4/5 stars |
| New Release Today | 3.5/5 stars |

Awarding the album four stars at CCM Magazine, Grace Aspinwall states, "a well-written and sophisticated effort." Stephen Luff, rating the album a ten for Cross Rhythms, writes, "In 2012 Michael was honored as GMA's Songwriter Of The Year. Listening to this album, it's not hard to hear why." Giving the album three and a half stars from New Release Today, Sarah Fine says, "More Like A Lion lives up to its title fully." Jonathan Andre, signaling in a four star review by Indie Vision Music, replies, "Michael’s full length album is just as comforting and confronting as his EP." Indicating in a four star review at Christian Music Review, Laura Chambers describes, "Iron truly sharpens iron through Boggs’ heartfelt messages of encouragement and upbuilding. More Like A Lion will alternately convict and comfort you with its Christ-honoring message." Tom Hind, specifying in a four star review for Louder Than the Music, responds, "a nicely balanced album." Designating the album four stars by 365 Days of Inspiring Media, Joshua Andre recognizes, "Michael Boggs has given us potent, emotive, comforting, relaxing, upbeat and moving songs, and his ease at ‘switching genres and styles’ is very commendable."

== Track listing ==
| No. | Title | Writer(s) | Length |
|---|---|---|---|
| 1. | "Turn Around" | Michael Boggs, Matt Maher, Trevor Morgan | 4:08 |
| 2. | "Our Hallelujah" | Boggs, Jason Cox, Kevin Heider | 3:44 |
| 3. | "Rise" | Bogg, Cody Fry | 5:13 |
| 4. | "What Would Jesus Undo" | Boggs, Cox | 4:35 |
| 5. | "Resurrection and the Life" | | 0:34 |
| 6. | "Alive" | Boggs, Cox | 4:14 |
| 7. | "Heart On My Sleeve" | | 5:11 |
| 8. | "Head to the Heart" | Boggs, Cox | 4:12 |
| 9. | "Deep Deep Love" | Boggs | 4:49 |
| 10. | "Song In Me" | Boggs | 4:12 |
| 11. | "We Will Sing Jesus" | Boggs | 4:28 |
| 12. | "What I Already Know" | Boggs, Scotty Alexander, Bryan White | 3:51 |
| Total length: | | | 49:11 |
