= Dove Award for Songwriter of the Year =

Gospel Music Association Dove Award

Winners of the Gospel Music Association Dove Award for Songwriter of the Year are:

- 1969: Bill Gaither
- 1970: Bill Gaither
- 1971: Award vacated because of 1971 GMA vote-buying scandal
  - Had been won by Bill Gaither before nullification
- 1972: Bill Gaither
- 1973: Bill Gaither
- 1974: Bill Gaither
- 1975: Bill Gaither
- 1976: Bill Gaither
- 1977: Bill Gaither
- 1978: Dallas Holm
- 1980: Don Francisco (Awards moved from September to April)
- 1981: Gary Chapman
- 1982: Dottie Rambo
- 1983: Michael Card
- 1984: Lanny Wolfe
- 1985: Michael W. Smith
- 1986: Gloria Gaither
- 1987: Dick and Melodie Tunney
- 1988: Larnelle Harris
- 1989: Steven Curtis Chapman
- 1990: Steven Curtis Chapman
- 1991: Steven Curtis Chapman
- 1992: Steven Curtis Chapman
- 1993: Steven Curtis Chapman
- 1994: Steven Curtis Chapman
- 1995: Steven Curtis Chapman
- 1996: Michael W. Smith
- 1997: Steven Curtis Chapman
- 1998: Steven Curtis Chapman
- 1999: Rich Mullins
- 2000: Michael W. Smith
- 2001: Nicole C. Mullen
- 2002: Bart Millard (of MercyMe)
- 2003: Nichole Nordeman
- 2004: Mark Hall
- 2005: Mark Hall
- 2006: Christa Wells
- 2007: Aaron Shust
- 2008: Cindy Morgan
- 2009: Steven Curtis Chapman
- 2010: Jennie Lee Riddle
- 2011: Gerald Crabb
- 2012: Michael Boggs
- 2013: Matt Redman
- 2014: Chris Tomlin
- 2015: Matt Maher (artist), Seth Mosley (non-artist)
- 2016: Lauren Daigle (artist), Jason Ingram (non-artist)
- 2017: Bart Millard (artist), Bernie Herms (non-artist)
- 2018: Matthew West (artist), Colby Wedgeworth (non-artist)
- 2019: Bart Millard (artist), Jason Ingram (non-artist)
- 2020: Zach Williams (artist), Jason Ingram (non-artist)
- 2021: Brandon Lake (artist), Jason Ingram (non-artist)
- 2022: Phil Wickham (artist), Jason Ingram (non-artist)
