= Wise Up (Amy Grant song) =

Single by Amy Grant

from the album Unguarded
- Released: 1985
- Genre: CCM, Pop
- Length: 3:53
- Label: A&M, Word Records
- Songwriters: Wayne Kirkpatrick, Billy Simon
- Producer: Brown Bannister

Amy Grant singles chronology
"Everywhere I Go" (1985)	"Wise Up" (1985)	"Sharayah" (1985)

Music video
- "Wise Up" on YouTube

"Wise Up" is a 1985 single by Christian music singer Amy Grant. It was released as the third single from her Unguarded album. The song reached The Billboard 100, as well as the Adult Contemporary and Christian music charts in the United States.

"Wise Up" is an uptempo, inspirational song with a rock sound, featuring heavy percussion and guitars. The lyric "better use your head to guard your heart" may be a reference to the album's title, Unguarded. That lyric essentially summarizes the song's central theme.

== Background ==
The lead single from Unguarded was "Find a Way", a song that not only went No. 1 on the Christian music chart, but also gave Grant her first-ever hit on pop radio (making it the first Contemporary Christian music song to chart on pop radio as well). "Wise Up" and the single that came before it, "Everywhere I Go", capitalized on Grant's newfound mainstream success and were released to both Christian and mainstream pop radio.

Grant had previewed the song on the 1984 "Straight Ahead Tour" while the song was still being developed. Its album version was substantially different. During the 1988-89 Lead Me On Tour, Grant performed an updated rendition of "Wise Up" as a regular part of her set list. Since then, the artist has frequently included the song with an updated arrangement in her concerts, including a deep bass version on the "Heart in Motion Tour" and an acoustic rendering with a vintage slide guitar on the "House of Love Tour." The song was also given a "Big Beats" dance remix, which featured, among other things, additional sound effects and Grant repeating the phrase "Pack 'em up, move 'em out".

== Chart performance ==
"Wise Up" performed very well on Christian radio, landing the No. 2 spot on the Christian music charts in the U.S. On mainstream radio, "Wise Up" didn't rise as high as "Find a Way" but did well in some markets. The single peaked at No. 66 on The Billboard Hot 100 and No. 34 on the Adult Contemporary chart. The previous single, "Everywhere I Go," became the follow-up at mainstream radio and would only reach No. 28 on Adult Contemporary in early 1986 without appearing on the Hot 100.

== Music video ==
Grant released a music video for the song, composed of footage from her successful Unguarded tour. In the video, Grant dons the famous leopard skin jacket that is pictured on the cover of Unguarded. Because of the jacket's appearance on the album cover and the music video, as well as Grant's tendency to wear it on television appearances, in concert, and on the Grammy Awards telecast, the jacket became a signature emblem for Grant during the 1980s.

The music video was released on Grant's Find a Way VHS. That release, along with Grant's Old-Fashioned Christmas TV special and VHS release, are among the only available footage from the Unguarded tour. The music video has not yet been released to DVD, but it can be viewed on YouTube.

== Personnel ==
- Amy Grant – lead vocals
- Robbie Buchanan – synthesizers
- Shane Keister – synthesizers
- Larry Williams –synthesizer, saxophone solo
- Dann Huff – electric guitar
- Paul Jackson Jr. – electric guitar
- Michael Landau – electric guitar
- Mike Brignardello – bass
- Paul Leim – drums, LinnDrum programming
- Lenny Castro – percussion
- Bill Champlin – backing vocals
- Tommy Funderburk – backing vocals

== Charts ==
Chart (1985)	Peak position
Adult Contemporary	34
Billboard Hot 100	66
