= I Want to Be Like You =

Studio album by FFH
- Released: 1998
- Recorded: 1998
- Studio: The Bennett House and Sound Kitchen (Franklin, Tennessee); Sixteenth Avenue Sound, Black Dog Studio, Quad Studios and Recording Arts (Nashville, Tennessee)
- Genre: CCM
- Length: 47:32
- Label: Essential Records
- Producer: Scott Williamson

FFH chronology
I Want to Be Like You (1998)	Found a Place (2000)

I Want to Be Like You is the first studio album from FFH on Essential Records following the release of six independent projects. It was released in 1998. The song "One of These Days" was featured on WOW #1s: 31 of the Greatest Christian Music Hits Ever. The album peaked at number 64 on the Billboard 200.

== Track listing ==
1. "One of These Days" - 4:25 (Jeromy Deibler)
2. "Take Me as I Am" - 2:54 (Jeromy Deibler)
3. "Fall to You" -4:09 (Jeromy Deibler)
4. "I Want to Be Like You" - 3:53 (Jeromy Deibler)
5. "I'm Alright" - 4:14 (Jeromy Deibler)
6. "Big Fish" - 3:32 (Jeromy Deibler, Kathy Els)
7. "Wholly to You" - 3:58 (Jeromy Deibler)
8. "So Is His Love" - 3:44 (Rick Hansen)
9. "Only You" - 3:50 (Jeromy Deibler, Scott Williamson)
10. "Breathe in Me" - 3:58 (Jeromy Deibler)
11. "Little Change" - 4:49 (Jeromy Deibler)
12. "Power in His Blood" - 4:06 (Donna Smith, Jeromy Deibler)

== Personnel ==
FFH

- Jeromy Deibler – vocals
- Jennifer Deibler – vocals
- Brian Smith – vocals
- Steve Croyle – vocals, guitars

Additional musicians

- Byron Hagan – organ (1–5, 10), keyboards (4, 8, 10, 11), acoustic piano (11)
- Jeffrey Roach – keyboards (7, 9)
- Jerry McPherson – guitars
- Jimmie Lee Sloas – bass (1, 3, 6, 8, 12)
- Jackie Street – bass (2, 4, 5, 7, 9–11)
- Scott Williamson – drums (1–4, 6–12)
- Steve Brewster – programming (1–3, 8, 10–12), loops (1–3, 8, 10–12), drums (5, 6)
- Shane Holloman – percussion (4, 7)

== Production ==
- Robert Beeson – executive producer
- Bob Wohler – executive producer
- Scott Williamson – producer, overdubbing
- Paul "Salvo" Salveson – engineer (1–9, 11, 12), mixing (1, 2, 6, 10, 12)
- Randy Poole – engineer (10), overdubbing
- Tom Laune – mixing (3–5, 7–9, 11)
- John Mayfield – editing at Mayfield Mastering (Nashville, Tennessee)
- Hank Williams – mastering at MasterMix (Nashville, Tennessee)
- Michelle Kapp at Axis Media – design
- Matthew Barnes – photography
