= B & G Sides =

B & G Sides, Vol. 1-4

Compilation album by The Hard Lessons
- Released: July 8, 2008
- Genre: Rock & Roll, indie rock
- Label: Quack Media

The Hard Lessons chronology
| Hey Hey, My My (2007) | B & G Sides, Vol. 1-4 (2008) | Arms Forest (2009) |

Professional ratings
Review scores
| Source | Rating |
|---|---|
| PopMatters | 8/10 stars |

B & G Sides, Vol. 1-4 is a compilation album combining B & G Sides, Vol. 1, B & G Sides, Vol. 2, B & G Sides, Vol. 3, and B & G Sides, Vol. 4. It was released as a full set in 2008. The compilation is available only as an export outside the US.

== Track listing ==
1. "The Painter (Intro)" - 0:49
2. "See and Be Scene" - 3:06
3. "Don't Shake My Tree" - 3:04
4. "The Sound of Coming Down (Intro)" - 1:31
5. "Everything Away" - 3:48
6. "I Like Your Hair Long" - 3:58
7. "Go Die (Intro)" - 1:49
8. "12345678" - 3:28
9. "Come Back To Me" - 3:55
10. "Teenage Girls Hold the Keys to the World" - 1:53
11. "The Sound of Coming Down" - 3:25
12. "The Painter" - 6:48
