= What About the Love =

Single by Amy Grant

from the album Lead Me On
- Released: 1988
- Genre: CCM, Adult Contemporary, Pop
- Length: 4:53
- Label: A&M, Word Records, EMI Records
- Songwriters: Kye Fleming, Janis Ian
- Producer: Brown Bannister

Amy Grant singles chronology
"1974 (We Were Young)" (1988)	"What About the Love" (1988)	"Say Once More" (1988)

"What About the Love" is a song by Christian music singer Amy Grant, written by Kye Fleming & Janis Ian. It was released as the fourth single from Grant's Lead Me On album. Unlike some of Grant's previous singles, this song was released to Christian radio only and was not marketed to pop or "mainstream" radio.

"What About the Love" is a downtempo inspirational song that adopts a mysterious sound through the use of keyboards, acoustic guitars, and haunting background vocals. The lyrics center around the idea that "something's wrong in Heaven tonight", with each verse decrying some segment of society's neglect of another segment. The first verse tackles preachers who are too focused on religious legalism rather than love. The second verse talks of the corporate world's abuse of despair around the world. The third verse concerns the futility that the elderly feels when the world has decided that their "usefulness" is gone. Finally, the fourth verse finds the singer staring at herself in the mirror, realizing that she is no better than those she has criticized, and likening herself to those who crucified Jesus. The lyrics reveal that the eponymous "love" in the song refers to "the love of God".

== Background ==
The first two singles from Lead Me On cracked the mainstream pop charts in addition to topping the U.S. Christian charts. The album's four remaining singles, however, charted only on Christian radio. The release of "What About the Love" came at a time when Grant was at what seemed to be the height of her career, having recently become the first Contemporary Christian music artist to achieve success on pop radio (though she would later achieve far greater success in the 1990s). The Lead Me On album is widely considered one of the greatest and most successful Christian albums ever recorded and was named the greatest of all time by CCM Magazine.

== Personnel ==
- Amy Grant – lead vocals
- Robbie Buchanan – keyboards
- Carl Marsh – keyboards
- Alan Pasqua – keyboards
- Gary Chapman – acoustic guitar
- Dann Huff – guitars
- Jerry McPherson – guitars
- Mike Brignardello – bass
- Paul Leim – drums
- Lenny Castro – percussion
- Mary Ann Kennedy – backing vocals
- Pam Rose – backing vocals

== Chart Success ==
"What About the Love" was a big success on Christian radio, becoming a No. 1 hit on the Christian music charts in the United States. However, it did not place on any of the major mainstream pop or Adult Contemporary charts.
