= Say Once More =

Single by Amy Grant

from the album Lead Me On
- Released: 1988
- Genre: CCM, Adult Contemporary, Pop
- Length: 4:57
- Label: A&M, Word Records, EMI Records
- Songwriters: Amy Grant, Gardner Cole
- Producer: Brown Bannister

Amy Grant singles chronology
"What About the Love" (1988)	"Say Once More" (1988)	"Faithless Heart" (1988)

"Say Once More" is a 1988 single by Christian music singer Amy Grant. It was released as the fifth single from Grant's Lead Me On album. Unlike some of Grant's previous singles, this song made an impact on Christian radio but not on pop or "mainstream" radio.

"Say Once More" is a downtempo love ballad. Unlike the other five singles from Lead Me On, "Say Once More" does not feature any explicitly Christian lyrics, though it performed well on Christian radio, and can arguably be read either as a secular love song or as a love letter to God.

The song should not be confused with another Amy Grant song of the same name. Grant recorded a very different-sounding song with different lyrics, also titled "Say Once More", for her 1980 album, Never Alone, but like Lead Me On, that song is also the ending track on Never Alone.

== Background ==
The first two singles from Lead Me On cracked the mainstream pop charts in addition to topping the U.S. Christian charts. The album's four remaining singles, however, charted only on Christian radio. The release of "Say Once More" came at a time when Grant was at what seemed to be the height of her career, having recently become the first Contemporary Christian music artist to achieve success on pop radio (though she would later achieve far greater success in the 1990s). The Lead Me On album is widely considered one of the greatest and most successful Christian albums ever recorded and was named the greatest of all time by CCM Magazine.

== Personnel ==
- Amy Grant – lead vocals
- Alan Pasqua – keyboards
- Keith Thomas – keyboards, Synclavier
- Brett Perry – Synclavier
- Benmont Tench – Hammond B3 organ
- Dann Huff – guitar
- Jimmie Lee Sloas – bass
- Lenny Castro – percussion
- Wayne Kirkpatrick – backing vocals

== Official versions ==
- Album Version - 4:57

"Say Once More" was included on Grant's 2014 remix compilation album titled In Motion: The Remixes. On September 9, 2014, a remix EP was released on iTunes in support of the album:

1. Hex Hector Radio Edit - 3:32
2. Hex Hector Remix - 6:10
3. Hex Hector Dub - 6:10
4. Hex Hector Remix Instrumental - 6:10

== Chart Success ==
Despite the small role of faith in the lyrics, "Say Once More" was a success on Christian radio, peaking at #2 on the Christian music charts in the United States. However, it did not place on any of the major mainstream pop or Adult Contemporary charts.

== 20th Anniversary Edition ==
In 2007, Grant had left Word Records and A&M Records, the two labels which had overseen the original release of Lead Me On. That year, her new record label, EMI Records, reissued a new digitally remastered edition of Lead Me On. In 2008, EMI again reissued the album, this time as a double-disc 20th Anniversary Edition. The second disc of that re-release featured a new recording of "Say Once More" by Amy Grant with Will Owsley on guitar. Grant described the new recording as "a songwriter's version", with the music stripped down to further emphasize the lyrics. In promoting the re-release, Grant performed the new acoustic version during various media appearances.

== Charts ==
Chart (1988)	Position
US Billboard Christian	2
