= Saved by Love =

Single by Amy Grant

from the album Lead Me On
- B-side: "Shadows"
- Released: 1988
- Genre: CCM, pop
- Length: 4:38
- Label: A&M
- Songwriters: Amy Grant, Justin Peters, Chris Smith
- Producer: Brown Bannister

Amy Grant singles chronology
"The Next Time I Fall" (1986)	"Saved by Love" (1988)	"Lead Me On" (1988)

"Saved by Love" is a 1988 single by the Christian music singer Amy Grant. It was released as the first single from her Lead Me On album.

Keyboardist Benmont Tench from Tom Petty and the Heartbreakers was the featured Hammond B3 organ player on the song's mid-solo.

"Saved by Love" was a number-one Christian hit and peaked at #32 on the adult contemporary chart.

== Personnel ==
- Amy Grant – lead and backing vocals
- Robbie Buchanan – acoustic piano
- Benmont Tench – Hammond B3 organ
- Gary Chapman – acoustic guitar
- Dann Huff – guitars
- Jerry McPherson – guitars
- Mark O'Connor – mandolin
- Mike Brignardello – bass
- Paul Leim – drums

== Charts ==
Chart (1988–1989)	Peak position
Australia (ARIA)	172
US CCM Hot Hits	1
US CCM Hot Adult Contemporary	1
US Billboard Hot Adult Contemporary	32

== Music sample ==
"Saved by Love"
