= Faithless Heart =

Single by Amy Grant

from the album Lead Me On
- Released: 1988
- Genre: CCM, Adult Contemporary, Pop
- Length: 5:13
- Label: A&M, Word Records, EMI Records
- Songwriters: Amy Grant, Michael W. Smith
- Producer: Brown Bannister

Amy Grant singles chronology
| "Say Once More" (1988) | "Faithless Heart" (1988) | "'Tis So Sweet to Trust in Jesus" (1989) |

"Faithless Heart" is a 1988 single by Christian music singer Amy Grant. It was released as the sixth and final single from Grant's very successful Lead Me On album. Unlike some of Grant's previous singles, this song made a sales and airplay impact on Christian radio but not on pop or "mainstream" radio.

"Faithless Heart" is a downtempo song that caused eyebrows to raise when it was released in the late 1980s. The music adopts a haunting sound with Hammond organ music, whispering, and ominous background vocals. The very personal lyrics detail Grant's doubts about her marriage with then-husband Gary Chapman. In the song, she discusses her temptation to walk out on her husband but her defiant choice to resist temptation and "choose the man that waits for me with a heart that's true". Such messages of doubt had been a central theme of Grant's music up to the point and since, but the lyrics that some perceived as hinting at divorce or adultery made some in the Christian community uneasy. Nevertheless, the song was successful on Christian radio.

The song has received widespread critical praise and is today often heralded as a brave masterpiece. In a 2002 Lifetime documentary on Grant's career, the artist's managers singled out "Faithless Heart" as a classic song that made them very proud of Grant's career, despite the controversy they faced when the song released to radio.

== Background ==
The first two singles from Lead Me On cracked the mainstream pop charts in addition to topping the U.S. Christian charts. The album's four remaining singles, however, charted only on Christian radio. The release of "Faithless Heart" came at a time when Grant was at what seemed to be the height of her career, having recently become one of the first Contemporary Christian music artists to achieve success on pop radio (though she would later achieve far greater success in the 1990s). It also came at a time when Grant and her husband at the time, Gary Chapman, were facing ongoing marital problems. Chapman had battled drug addiction in the 1980s but it was "Faithless Heart" that first clued the public into the problems that Grant faced at home. Grant and Chapman divorced in 1999.

The Lead Me On album is widely considered one of the greatest and most successful Christian albums ever recorded and topped CCM Magazine's 1998 list of the 100 greatest CCM albums.

== Chart Success ==
"Faithless Heart" peaked at #12 on the Christian music charts in the United States. Though still a Top 15 hit, the single had the weakest chart performance of any single from Lead Me On. That may be partly due to the song's position as the sixth Lead Me On single. Chart success often declines for singles released toward the end of an album's radio promotion. The controversial lyrics, however, may also account for the lower chart performance. The song did not crack the pop or mainstream charts.

== 20th Anniversary Edition ==
In 2007, Grant had left Word Records and A&M Records, the two labels which had overseen the original release of Lead Me On. That year, her new record label, EMI Records, reissued a new digitally remastered edition of Lead Me On. In 2008, EMI again reissued the album, this time as a double-disc 20th Anniversary Edition. The second disc of that re-release featured a new recording of "Faithless Heart" by Amy Grant with Michael W. Smith on the electric piano. Grant described the new recording as "a songwriter's version", with the music stripped down to further emphasize the lyrics. The disc also featured a new introduction track with Grant and Smith discussing how to begin the song. In promoting the re-release, Grant performed the new acoustic version during various media appearances.
