= Lead Me On (Amy Grant song) =

Single by Amy Grant

from the album Lead Me On
- B-side: "Find a Way" "Stay For A While (on 12")"
- Released: 1988
- Genre: CCM, Pop
- Length: 5:35 (Album Version); 4:16 (Radio Edit)
- Label: A&M
- Songwriters: Amy Grant, Wayne Kirkpatrick, Michael W. Smith
- Producer: Brown Bannister

Amy Grant singles chronology
"Saved by Love" (1988)	"Lead Me On" (1988)	"1974 (We Were Young)" (1988)

Music video
- "Lead Me On" on YouTube

"Lead Me On"

"Lead Me On" is a 1988 single by Christian music singer Amy Grant. It was released as the second single from the Lead Me On album.

== Content ==
"Lead Me On" was written by Amy Grant, Wayne Kirkpatrick, and Michael W. Smith. It is a fiery song, both in terms of lyrics and in music. The lyrics, according to Grant, deal abstractly with slavery and the Holocaust. The lyrics also talk about man's relation to these events and man's relation to man. The message of the song makes it very strong, unusual for Amy Grant, who was known as a pop/contemporary artist with meaningful, but light lyrics. The music only adds to the drama of the lyrics. This is helped along by the unusual time signature of the verses, with odd-numbered bars adding heightened tension. The intro on the album version is also in 6/8 and 4/4 simultaneously. It is mostly electric guitar, in stark contrast to the natural sounding songs on the rest of the Lead Me On album.

Another seemingly important aspect of the song was when it was being recorded. Grant was recording on the night of September 24, 1987, when she went into labor. She went to the hospital and had her first child, Matthew Garrison Chapman, the next day.

== Chart performance ==
Like almost all the other singles from the album, it topped the Christian radio chart. "Lead Me On" became the only single to chart on the Billboard Hot 100, peaking at #96 and remaining on the chart for two weeks. In the United Kingdom, the single fared slightly better, peaking at #89, her first single to register on the charts there.

== Personnel ==
- Amy Grant – lead vocals
- Michael W. Smith – keyboards
- Alan Pasqua – keyboards
- Benmont Tench – Hammond B3 organ
- Dann Huff – guitars
- Jerry McPherson – guitars
- Mike Brignardello – bass
- Paul Leim – drums
- Bill Champlin – backing vocals
- Tommy Funderburk – backing vocals

== Charts ==
Chart (1988)	Peak position
UK Singles Chart	89
US CCM Hot Hits	1
US CCM Hot Adult Contemporary	5
US Billboard Hot 100	96

== Cover versions ==
- "Lead Me On" was performed by Bethany Dillon on her self-titled debut album in 2004.
- Krista Branch performed Lead Me On, promoting it as a "pro-Israel" song.
- for KING & COUNTRY teamed up with Amy Grant to release a version of “Lead Me On” on the album Unsung Hero (The Inspired By Soundtrack) (2024).
