= Ageless Medley =

EP by Amy Grant
- Released: 1983
- Recorded: 1983
- Genre: Contemporary Christian music
- Length: 6:10
- Label: Myrrh, Word
- Producer: Brown Bannister

Amy Grant chronology
Age to Age (1982)	Ageless Medley (1983)	A Christmas Album (1983)

Ageless Medley is an extended play by Amy Grant, released in 1983 on the label Myrrh Records.It was originally released as a double-sided 7" vinyl record and audio cassette tape EP single. Even though it was designed as purely a promotional tool, it reached the top ten of the Christian radio charts, and won the 1984 Grammy Award for Best Gospel Performance, Female. It was later featured on the CD and cassette releases of Grant's 1986 compilation album The Collection. The title refers to Grant's 1982 album Age to Age, which references a lyric in the song "El Shaddai"

== Track listing ==
7" vinyl/cassette, sides 1 & 2

- Ageless Medley

"Old Man's Rubble"
"Too Late"
"Walking Away with You"
"El Shaddai"
"I'm Gonna Fly"
"Father's Eyes"
"Sing Your Praise to the Lord"
"I Have Decided"

== Accolades ==
- Best Gospel Performance, Female, 1984
