= Dedication (art) =

In art, a dedication is the creation or attribution of a work of art as a tribute to or in honor of a person, place, or thing. The dedicatee may be the commissioner, conductor, premiere performer or musical ensemble, or patron. The work may be memorial.

In music, examples include many of Beethoven's works, such as the Piano Sonata Op. 109, dedicated to his friend Antonie Brentano's daughter Maximiliane.

In literature, examples include Vladimir Nabokov's dedication of works to his wife Véra.

== See also ==
- Concert program
