= The Hard Lessons =

American rock band

- The Hard Lessons at St. Andrews Hall, December 26th, 2007

Background information
- Origin: East Lansing, Michigan, Michigan, U.S.
- Genres: Indie rock, Rock & Roll, pop, Soul, Blues
- Years active: 2003—present
- Members: Augie Visocchi; Korin Louise Visocchi; Steven Warstler
- Past members: The Anvil, Tom Lietz, Mark Dawson, Ryan Vandeberghe
- Website: The Hard Lessons

The Hard Lessons are a rock band from Detroit, Michigan, known for their high-energy live appearances and innovative sound. The band has toured extensively in the United States and Europe. They were originally formed at Michigan State University in East Lansing.

The band consists of married couple Augie Visocchi (Vocals, Electric & Acoustic Guitars, Fuzz Bass, Mandolin, Piano, Kazoo, Percussion, and Vacuum) and Korin "Ko Ko" Louise Visocchi (Vocals, Piano, Synthesizers, Hammond Organ Bass, Autoharp, Glockenspiel, Cornet, Percussion). Mark Dawson is their current live drummer.

They were named 2006 Artists of the Year by Real Detroit Weekly. Their song "Wedding Ring" was featured in an episode of Grey's Anatomy. Their song "Wicked Man" was featured in an episode of Friday Night Lights. Their song "See and Be Scene" was featured in a 2010 Chevrolet commercial.

== Studio Discography ==
Date of release	Title	Record label
2004	Rock N Soul Live at Small's	Self-Released
2004	"Feedback Loop b/w Love Gone Cold 7" VINYL	Self-Released
2005	Gasoline	No Fun Records
2006	Wise Up!	Self-Released
2007	Hey Hey, My My	Self-Released
2008	B & G Sides	Quack Media
2009	Arms Forest	Quack Media
2011	Down Off The Ceiling Vol. 1	Gold Tapes
2014	Start What You Finished	Gangplank Records
