= Angels (Amy Grant song) =

Single by Amy Grant

from the album Straight Ahead
- Released: 1984
- Genre: Contemporary Christian
- Label: Myrrh Records
- Songwriter(s): Amy Grant, Brown Bannister, Gary Chapman, Michael W. Smith

Amy Grant singles chronology
"Emmanuel" (1983)	"Angels" (1984)	"Thy Word" (1984)

"Angels" is a 1984 single by Christian singer Amy Grant, from her album Straight Ahead. Grant performed the song at the 1985 Grammy Awards, where it won her an award for Best Gospel Vocal Performance, Female. It also reached No. 1 on Billboard Hot Christian Songs.

The song begins with an account of the apostle Peter's capture by Herod's guards in the Bible, and goes on to describe how God has His angels watching over believers, to guide and protect them in times of fear, doubt, confusion, or temptation.

"Angels"

== Personnel ==
- Amy Grant – lead vocals
- Robbie Buchanan – acoustic piano
- Michael W. Smith – keyboards, Yamaha GS2
- Shane Keister – synthesizers
- Jon Goin – guitars
- Mike Brignardello – bass
- Andy Widders-Ellis - Chapman Stick
- Paul Leim – drums
- Deborah Black – backing vocals
- Bill Champlin – backing vocals
- Tamara Champlin – backing vocals
- Marty McCall – backing vocals
- Gary Pigg – backing vocals
- Carmen Twillie – backing vocals
