= 1974 (We Were Young) =

Single by Amy Grant

from the album Lead Me On
- B-side: "If You Have to Go Away"
- Released: 1988
- Genre: CCM, Adult Contemporary, Pop
- Length: 4:22
- Label: A&M
- Songwriters: Amy Grant, Gary Chapman, Jerry McPherson
- Producer: Brown Bannister

Amy Grant singles chronology
"Lead Me On" (1988)	"1974 (We Were Young)" (1988)	"What About the Love" (1988)

"1974 (We Were Young)" is a 1988 single by Christian music singer Amy Grant; it is rated 2 out of 5 by AllMusic. It was released as the third single from her album Lead Me On.

== Lyrics ==
The song is about Grant's discovery of faith at the age of fourteen (Grant was born on November 25, 1960), the first verse saying, "We were young...Down upon our knees/we tasted holy wine." In the chorus, Grant tells of God's love at the founding of Him, saying, "Purer than the sky behind the rain...Love had lit a fire we were the flame." The final verses talk about how the discovery of God changes people: "No one had to say we were changed/Nothing else we lived through would ever be the same" and how those who experience God's love never want it to go away: "Stay with me/Make it ever new." In interviews following the release of the song, she revealed that it should have been titled "1975".

== Impact ==
It was given a poor, 2 stars rating out of 5 by AllMusic.

== Personnel ==
- Amy Grant – lead and backing vocals
- Robbie Buchanan – keyboards
- Alan Pasqua – keyboards
- Dann Huff – 12-string guitar
- Jerry McPherson – electric guitar, zither
- Mike Brignardello – bass
- Paul Leim – drums
- Lenny Castro – percussion

== Charts ==
Unlike Grant's previous few singles, "1974" did not achieve mainstream success. Although a #1 Christian single, "1974" only managed to reach #31 on the Adult Contemporary chart. The B side of the single is "If You Have to Go Away", another track from the album.

Chart (1988)	Peak position
US Adult Contemporary	31
US Billboard Christian	1
