= In Concert (Canadian TV program) =

- Genre: Concert
- Country of origin: Canada
- Original language: English
- No. of seasons: 1

Production
- Production location: Toronto
- Running time: 30 minutes
- Production companies: Wilks and Close Associates

Original release
- Network: CBC Television
- Release: 8 July – 16 September 1981

In Concert is a Canadian music concert television program that aired on CBC Television in 1981.

== Premise ==
Concerts were recorded during 1980 at Ontario Place's Forum in Toronto (a venue since replaced by the Molson Amphitheatre and Budweiser Stage). Artists featured included Judy Collins, Rita Coolidge, Chick Corea, Maynard Ferguson, Dizzy Gillespie, The Good Brothers, Dan Hill, Murray McLauchlan, Sérgio Mendes, Peter Tosh and The Travellers.

== Scheduling ==
This half-hour series was broadcast at random times, often on a Wednesday, from 8 July to 16 September 1981.
