= 1974 (band) =

American band

- Origin: Newington, CT
- Genre: Progressive rock
- Years active: 2007––present
- Members: Mike Forgette; Tim Moore; Gary Dionne; Adam Clymer; Parker Hu
- Past members: Dan Neiderhauser; Nick Garofolo; Angela Rhea Piccoli
- Website: 1974online.com

1974 is a cross-over progressive rock band from Newington, Connecticut. The band consists of Mike Forgette (guitar and vocals), Tim Moore (drums and vocals), Gary Dionne (bass and vocals), Adam Clymer (guitar), and Parker Hu (keys and vocals). The band's debut album, 1974 & The Battle For The Lazer Fortress, was released in February 2011. The following year, 1974 released two EP's: The Return and A Soldier's Tale. In 2013, the band released 1974 & The Death Of The Herald, a follow-up to their debut album which received critical acclaim. 1974 is known for their complex time-signatures, full vocal harmonies, and energetic stage show. 1974 is one of the top rock bands in Connecticut, consistently placing in the top 10 rock bands in Hartford according to ReverbNation as well as The Deli's top 100 artists in Connecticut.

== History ==
=== 2011: 1974 & The Battle For The Lazer Fortress ===
1974 & The Battle For The Lazer Fortress was released on February 18; the CD release show was held at UNH, and the communications department streamed the concert live through the university's website. The album received positive reviews from The Charger Bulletin, The Hartford Courant, and CTnow.com. Nick Garofolo left 1974 in the summer owing to the number of shows the band was playing; Adam Clymer took over as the second guitarist. Angela Rhea Piccoli then joined as the new keyboardist and vocalist.

=== 2012: The Return and A Soldier's Tale ===
In 2012, the band decided to dig into the back catalogue of songs written in the first few years and refine them for the current lineup. The Return was recorded and produced independently by the band; it was released on June 9, 2012 and featured songs written in 2007 and 2008. The album received positive reviews from CTnow.com and CTindie.com. In September the 1st Annual Connecticut Music Awards was held at The Bushnell. 1974 received two nominations and took home the award for Best New Band. A Soldier's Tale was the last album to be produced and recorded independently by 1974; it was released on December 14, 2012 and featured songs written in 2008 and 2009.

=== 2013: 1974 & The Death Of The Herald ===
For their second full-length album, 1974 revisited the world they created in 1974 & The Battle For The Lazer Fortress. 1974 & The Death Of The Herald was recorded in the summer of 2013 at Sonic Environments by engineer and co-producer Jeff Weed. When the album was released on October 26, 2013, 1974 performed both full-length albums back-to-back. The album was well received, making LonesomeNoise.com's choice for album of the year. In September, the 2nd Annual Connecticut Music Awards was held, and 1974 took home the Best Rock Band award which was presented by Living Colour.

=== 2014-Present ===
1974's music began to spread internationally, gaining reviews from prog rock websites around the world. The Great Galactic War appeared on the 2nd 24 bit Compilation released by Erzetich, a high-end European electronics producer. The song is also in regular rotation for Cygnus radio. 1974 received awards for Best Rock Band and Best Overall Band from the 2014 Connecticut Music Awards, becoming the first band to win awards for three consecutive years. Paste Magazine included 1974 in their article "10 Connecticut Bands You Should Listen To Now". In the fall of 2014, 1974 started writing material for their third full-length album. Angela Rhea Piccoli left 1974 in December 2014 to pursue other musical interests; Parker Hu replaced Angela on keys and vocals. At the tail end of 2014, the New England Music Awards nominated 1974 as one of the contenders for Rock Act of the Year. In April 2015, 1974 was voted best band in the Rock category for the third time in the Connecticut Music Awards.

== Discography ==
=== 1974 & The Battle For The Lazer Fortress ===
1. Overture
2. Intro
3. The War That Tears Apart The Sky
4. Clone Discovery
5. Welcome To Earth
6. Wait
7. Interlude
8. Guide Our Hands
9. T.E.M.P's
10. Song of Survivors

=== The Return ===
1. The Stirring
2. A Sickening Silence
3. Jubilation
4. Walk In Place
5. The Outline

=== A Soldier's Tale ===
1. Execution of the Wooddaughter
2. The Pyre at Violent Hill
3. Gently Shaken
4. March of Men
5. The Battle
6. Fall of Heroes
7. Voices

=== 1974 & The Death Of The Herald ===
1. The Great Galactic War
2. Phantoms
3. Herald Of Life
4. Building An Empire
5. Essential Arms
6. A New Beginning
7. Vera
8. Admiral Tackett
9. The United Earthlands' Assembly
10. A Dark Thought
11. Abduction
12. Ultimatum
13. Death Of The Herald

== Awards ==
Year	Award	Category
2012	CT Music Awards	Best New Band
2013	CT Music Awards	Best Rock Band
2014	CT Music Awards	Best Rock Band
2014	CT Music Awards	Best Overall Band
2015	CT Music Awards	Best Rock Band
