= FFH (band) =

Christian band from Pennsylvania, United States

- Also known as: Far From Home, Four for Harmony
- Origin: Lancaster, Pennsylvania, United States
- Genres: Contemporary Christian music, worship
- Years active: 1993–present
- Label: Essential
- Members: Jennifer Deibler; Jeromy Deibler
- Past members: Michael Boggs; Jonathan Firey; Brian Smith; Steve Croyle; Chris Ulery
- Website: ffh.net

FFH, also known as Far from Home, are an American contemporary Christian band from Lancaster, Pennsylvania. Formed in 1993, FFH released six independent projects before being signed by Essential Records. Since then, they have released seven studio albums, as well as a "greatest-hits" album.

== Background ==
The group formed as Four for Harmony, an a cappella group. Over time they developed a vocal acoustic pop style, similar to that of Avalon, and changed their name to Far from Home. That name was being used by a secular duo and they became known as FFH.

FFH sang on Shine Your Light with Nichole Nordeman and "Hide Me in Your Heart" on City On a Hill: Sing Alleluia (2002), and on "Table of the Lord" with Paul Coleman Trio on City On a Hill: The Gathering (2003), and "Where Are You" and "Merciful Rain" on City On a Hill: Songs of Worship and Praise (2000).

Following the release of their 2007 album, Worship in the Waiting, they took a break from touring.

Jeromy Deibler was diagnosed with multiple sclerosis in 2007 after he and Jennifer got back from Africa. Deibler is able to keep his MS under control with chemotherapy. The band returned in 2009 as a duo when members Jennifer and Jeromy Deibler released their independent album Wide Open Spaces. It was re-released in 2010 on P-ID Blue. It was followed up in 2011 by One Silent Night: An FFH Christmas. Then in 2012, FFH released their second worship album, and 11th studio album since their major label debut, The Way We Worship.

Jeromy was a full-time worship leader at Journey Christian Church in Irvine, California. They moved back to Franklin, TN in 2021. Jeromy is a life coach and has a podcast called The Gospel According to Jeromy.

== Band members ==
- Jennifer Lois Deibler (born June 14, 1972: née; Els, Hillsboro, Missouri) – vocals
- Jeromy Shawn Deibler (born August 19, 1974, Lancaster, Pennsylvania) – piano, guitar, vocals

Former

- Michael Dean Boggs (born November 8, 1978, Tulsa, Oklahoma) – guitar, vocals (until 2007)
- Brian Richard Smith (born July 27, 1974, Quarryville, Pennsylvania) – bass, vocals (until 2007)
- Jonathan Firey – guitar
- Chris Ulery – bass
- Steve Croyle – vocals, guitar (until 1999)
- Chad Mussmon – vocal, guitar (until 1997)

== Discography ==
| Album | Year | Label | Billboard 200 | Top Christian Albums |
|---|---|---|---|---|
| Open Our Eyes | | independent | — | — |
| Forever for God | | independent | — | — |
| Heart to Heart | | independent | — | — |
| Brother to Brother | | independent | — | — |
| Called a Christian | | independent | — | — |
| One of These Days | 1994 | independent | — | — |
| Winter Wonder | unreleased | | — | — |
| I Want to Be Like You | 1998 | Essential | 64 | — |
| Found a Place | 2000 | Essential | 154 | — |
| Have I Ever Told You | 2001 | Essential | 119 | — |
| Ready to Fly | 2003 | Essential | 89 | 5 |
| Still the Cross | 2004 | Essential | — | 10 |
| Voice from Home | 2005 | Essential | — | — |
| Far from Home: The Best of FFH | 2007 | | — | — |
| Worship in the Waiting | 2007 | | — | — |
| Wide Open Spaces | 2009 | | — | — |
| One Silent Night: An FFH Christmas | 2011 | | — | — |
| The Way We Worship | 2012 | | — | — |

=== Singles ===
Numerous FFH singles have charted, including "Fly Away" and "Watching Over Me" which reached the No. 1 on Christian Adult Contemporary radio and the Top 5 on Christian Hit Radio, "On My Cross" which had a two-week run at No. 1 on inspirational radio. Other singles include "One of These Days", "Big Fish", "I Want to Be Like You" and "What It Feels Like". "Undone" reached No. 18 on the Billboard Hot Christian Songs chart.

== Books ==
- Far From Home: Stories From the Road (2001), Howard Publishing. ISBN 9781582292045
