= Wise Up! =

Studio album by The Hard Lessons
- Released: April 11, 2005
- Genre: Indie rock, garage rock
- Label: self-released
- Producer: Zach Shipps, The Hard Lessons

The Hard Lessons chronology
Gasoline (2005)	Wise Up! (2005)	Hey Hey My My (2007)

Professional ratings
Review scores
Source	Rating
Allmusic	3.5/5 stars

Wise Up! is an album by American indie rock group The Hard Lessons, self-released by the group in 2006. It was given away for free at several concerts.

== Track listing ==
1. "Bamboo" - 3:12
2. "Carey Says (Alright!)" - 1:53
3. "It Bleeds" - 3:37
4. "Move to California" - 3:30
5. "Wicked Man" - 2:53
