= Straight Ahead (Amy Grant album) =

Studio album by Amy Grant
- Released: April 6, 1984
- Recorded: 1983–1984
- Studios: Caribou Ranch (Nederland, Colorado); The Bennett House (Franklin, Tennessee); Bullet Recording (Nashville, Tennessee); Mama Jo's (North Hollywood, California); Bill Schnee Studio (North Hollywood, California); AIR (London, UK)
- Genre: Contemporary Christian music
- Length: 38:36
- Label: Myrrh
- Producer: Brown Bannister

Amy Grant chronology
A Christmas Album (1983)	Straight Ahead (1984)	Unguarded (1985)

Singles from Straight Ahead
- 1. "Angels" Released: 1984

Professional ratings
Review scores
Source	Rating
AllMusic	4/5 stars
Cross Rhythms	10/10 stars

Straight Ahead is the sixth studio album by Christian music artist Amy Grant, released in 1984.

Straight Ahead was the follow-up to Grant's ground-breaking 1982 album Age to Age. Containing songs that were more aggressive than the ones found on Age to Age, Straight Ahead was not as commercially successful as its predecessor. Nonetheless, it still topped Billboard's Christian album chart for 61 weeks, knocking Age to Age from the number-one position. The song "Angels" was also a No. 1 Christian radio hit for 13 weeks, and won a Grammy Award for "Best Gospel Performance, Female." Straight Ahead would be certified gold in 1985. The song "Thy Word" is based on Psalm 119:105.

In 2007, Straight Ahead was reissued and digitally remastered by Grant's new record label, EMI/Sparrow Records. The remastered edition is labeled with a "Digitally Remastered" logo in the 'gutter' on the CD front.

Straight Ahead was the first Christian album to chart on the Billboard 200 chart. A&M reissued it in 1985, just as Grant was appearing on the Grammy Awards performing "Angels".

== Track listing ==
No.	Title	Writer(s)	Length
1.	"Where Do You Hide Your Heart"	Amy Grant, Michael W. Smith	3:57
2.	"Jehovah"	Geoffrey P. Thurman	5:57
3.	"Angels"	Grant, Brown Bannister, Gary Chapman, Smith	4:10
4.	"Straight Ahead"	Grant, Chapman, Smith	3:47
5.	"Thy Word"	Grant, Smith	3:19
6.	"It's Not a Song"	Robbie Buchanan, Chapman	3:27
7.	"Open Arms"	Grant, Chapman, Bruce Hibbard	3:22
8.	"Doubly Good to You"	Rich Mullins	3:12
9.	"Tomorrow"	Grant, Chapman, Hibbard	3:24
10.	"The Now and the Not Yet"	Pam Mark Hall	3:36

== Personnel ==
Musicians

- Amy Grant – vocals
- Robbie Buchanan – Roland Jupiter 8 (1, 2, 5), acoustic piano (2, 3, 8), synthesizers (4), keyboards (6, 7), arrangements (6), Fender Rhodes (7, 9)
- Michael W. Smith – keyboards (1–5, 8–10), Yamaha GS2 (1–3, 8), acoustic piano (4, 5, 9, 10)
- Alan Steinberger – additional synthesizers (1, 5, 6, 9), synthesizers (10)
- Shane Keister – additional synthesizers (2, 5, 8), synthesizers (3), organ (4)
- Jon Goin – electric guitar (1), "fly" guitar (1), guitar (2–4, 6–10)
- Dann Huff – guitar solo (1), guitar (9)
- Gary Chapman – guitar (4), guitar solo (4)
- Dean Parks – guitar (7)
- Mike Brignardello – bass (1–4, 6–10)
- Andy Widders-Ellis – stick bass (3)
- Duncan Mullins – bass (4)
- Paul Leim – drums (1–4, 6–9)
- Kenny Malone – drums (10)
- Lenny Castro – percussion (1, 7, 9)
- Farrell Morris – percussion (8, 10)
- Alan Moore – string arrangements (2, 8)

Background vocalists

- Amy Grant – backing vocals (1, 5, 9, 10)
- Gary Chapman – backing vocals (1, 4, 5, 9)
- Donna McElroy – backing vocals (1, 2, 4, 5, 9)
- Kim Fleming – backing vocals (1, 4, 5, 9)
- Gary Pigg – backing vocals (2, 3)
- Debrorah Black – backing vocals (3)
- Bill Champlin – backing vocals (3)
- Tamara Champlin – backing vocals (3)
- Carmen Twillie – backing vocals (3)
- Marty McCall – backing vocals (3)
- Leann Jones – backing vocals (5)
- Curt Lyles – backing vocals (5)
- Mark Mason – backing vocals (5)
- Steve George – backing vocals (6)
- Richard Page – backing vocals (6)
- Thomas Cain – backing vocals (6)
- Chris Harris – backing vocals (7)
- Billy Sprague – backing vocals (7)
- David Thornton – backing vocals (7)
- Ron Downey – backing vocals (10)

Production

- Michael Blanton – executive producer
- Dan Harrell – executive producer
- Gary Chapman – executive producer
- Brown Bannister – producer
- Jack Joseph Puig – engineer
- Jim Baird – additional engineer
- Kevin Burns – additional engineer
- Gene Eichelberger – additional engineer
- Steven Ford – additional engineer
- Jerry Mahler – additional engineer
- Daniel Garcia – additional engineer
- Dennis Hill – design
- Mike Borum – photography
- Aaron Rapoport – photography

== Music videos ==
Music videos were released for "Angels" in 1984 and "It's Not a Song" in 1985.

== Charts ==
=== Weekly charts ===
Year	Chart	Position
1984	Top Contemporary Christian	1
1985	The Billboard 200	133
1985	Cash Box Top Albums	161

=== Year-end charts ===
Year	Chart	Position
1984	U.S. Billboard Inspirational Albums	3
1985	U.S. Billboard Inspirational Albums	1
1986	U.S. Billboard Inspirational Albums	8

=== End-of-decade charts ===
Chart (1980–1989)	Rank
US Billboard Top Contemporary Christian	11

== Certifications and sales ==
Region	Certification	Certified units/sales
Canada (Music Canada)	Gold	50,000^{^}
United States (RIAA)	Gold	500,000^{^}
^{^} Shipments figures based on certification alone.

== Accolades ==
GMA Dove Awards

Year	Winner	Category
1985	Straight Ahead	Pop/Contemporary Album of the Year

Grammy Awards

Year	Winner	Category
1985	"Angels"	Best Gospel Performance, Female
