= In Concert (Amy Grant album) =

Live album by Amy Grant
- Released: May 29, 1981
- Venues: Mabee Hall, Tulsa, Oklahoma; Lloyd Noble Center, Norman, Oklahoma
- Genre: Gospel/Christian
- Length: 44:13
- Label: Myrrh
- Producer: Brown Bannister

Amy Grant chronology
Never Alone (1980)	In Concert (1981)	In Concert Volume Two (1981)

Professional ratings
Review scores
Source	Rating
AllMusic	4/5 stars
Cross Rhythms	6/10 stars

In Concert is a live album by Christian singer Amy Grant, released in 1981 on Myrrh Records.

In Concert was the first album of a double live set, the other being In Concert Volume Two, which was released later that year. Although the two should have been issued as a double album, budget problems forced the two to be released separately. In Concert featured two new songs: "Mimi's House" and "Singing a Love Song", the latter became a Top Ten Christian radio hit. It was re-released in 2007 by Sparrow Records.

The album was nominated for Grammy Award for Best Gospel Performance, Contemporary.

== Track listing ==
No.	Title	Writer(s)	Length
1.	"Beautiful Music"	Lanier Ferguson	2:19
2.	"Giggle"	Amy Grant	1:20
3.	"Old Man's Rubble"	Brown Bannister	2:34
4.	"Never Give You Up"	Grant, Bannister, Marie Tomlinson	4:15
5.	"Mimi's House"	Grant	2:51
6.	"Father's Eyes"	Gary Chapman	4:34
7.	"Faith Walkin' People"	Grant, Bannister	3:35
8.	"Walking Away With You"	Grant, Chapman, Chris Christian	4:29
9.	"Mountain Top"	Bannister	4:07
10.	"All I Ever Have to Be"	Chapman	4:37
11.	"Singing a Love Song"	Jim Weber	3:52
12.	"Don't Give Up On Me"	Grant, Bannister, Chapman	4:37

== Personnel ==
- Amy Grant – lead vocals
- Eddie DeGarmo – keyboards
- Gerry Peters – Oberheim synthesizer
- Dana Key – electric guitars, backing vocals
- Billy Sprague – acoustic guitars, backing vocals
- Mike Brignardello – bass guitar
- Greg Morrow – drums
- David Durham – backing vocals
- Theresa Ellis – backing vocals
- Jan Harris – backing vocals
- Gary Pigg – backing vocals

=== Production ===
- Michael Blanton – executive producer
- Dan Harrell – executive producer
- Brown Bannister – producer, engineer, mixing
- Jack Joseph Puig – live recording engineer
- Malcom Harper – mobile recording
- Glenn Meadows – mastering at Masterfonics (Nashville, Tennessee)
- Michael Harris Design – art direction, design
- Wyatt Brown – cover photography

== Charts ==
=== Weekly charts ===
Year	Chart	Position
1995	Top Contemporary Christian	38

=== Year-end charts ===
Year	Chart	Position
1981	U.S. Billboard Inspirational Albums	25
1982	U.S. Billboard Inspirational Albums	6
