= Unguarded (Amy Grant album) =

Studio album by Amy Grant
- Released: May 15, 1985
- Recorded: 1984–85
- Studio: Caribou Ranch (Nederland, Colorado); The Bennett House (Franklin, Tennessee); Mama Jo's (North Hollywood, California); Bill Schnee Studio (North Hollywood, California); Bullet Recording (Nashville, Tennessee)
- Genre: Contemporary Christian music
- Length: 43:33
- Label: Myrrh, A&M
- Producer: Brown Bannister

Amy Grant chronology
Straight Ahead (1984)	Unguarded (1985)	The Collection (1986)

Alternate cover
- The W-O-R-D album covers (W & O on top and R & D on the bottom). When the album was issued on compact disc, the 'D' variation became the standard version for the cover.

Singles from Unguarded
- 1. "Find a Way" Released: 1985; 2. "Everywhere I Go" Released: 1985; 3. "Wise Up" Released: 1985; 4. "Sharayah" Released: 1985

Professional ratings
Review scores
Source	Rating
AllMusic	4/5 stars
Cross Rhythms	10/10 stars

Unguarded is the seventh studio album by Christian and pop singer Amy Grant, released in 1985 on A&M Records. It is Grant's first album released by A&M.

When Unguarded was released in 1985, Grant was perhaps the most popular star in contemporary Christian music, recording songs with religious lyrics in the pop/rock style of the day. With this album, however, the religious content of the lyrics was scaled back as compared with her two previous regular studio albums, Age to Age and Straight Ahead. The album track "I Love You" was Grant's first secular love song from her own pen. Despite this, the album's lead-off single, "Find a Way", was a number one hit on the Christian radio charts. Four other singles from the album were also Top Ten Christian radio hits.

The aggressive mainstream style of the songs on Unguarded, combined with a heavy promotional campaign on the part of the album's distributor in secular outlets, A&M Records, helped three of its singles reach the mainstream charts. "Find a Way" was a Top Ten hit on the Adult Contemporary chart and peaked at No. 29 on the Billboard Hot 100, while "Everywhere I Go" was a Top Thirty AC single and "Wise Up" was a minor charting single on the Hot 100. Unguarded would be certified gold in September 1985, and platinum in June 1986.

This was the final album to be recorded at Caribou Ranch, which was owned by former Chicago producer/manager James William Guercio before the infamous March 1985 fire that destroyed the studio's control room.

In 2007, Unguarded was reissued and digitally remastered by Grant's new record label, EMI/Sparrow Records. The remastered edition is labeled with a "Digitally Remastered" logo in the 'gutter' on the CD front.

On October 16, 2020, in celebration of the album's 35th anniversary, it was reissued on limited edition white vinyl, with the original 10-song album along with a bonus LP of live tracks and audio commentary from Grant, with an alternate album cover featuring all four of the W-O-R-D album covers. This version was later released digitally on October 30, for streaming services only.

== Track listing ==
No.	Title	Writer(s)	Length
1.	"Love of Another Kind"	Amy Grant, Gary Chapman, Wayne Kirkpatrick, Rich Mullins	3:22
2.	"Find a Way"	Grant, Michael W. Smith	3:28
3.	"Everywhere I Go"	Mary Lee Kortes	4:12
4.	"I Love You"	Grant, Dann Huff, Smith	4:25
5.	"Stepping In Your Shoes"	Grant, Chris Eaton	4:37
6.	"Fight"	Grant, Chapman, Huff	4:42
7.	"Wise Up"	Kirkpatrick, Billy Simon	3:51
8.	"Who to Listen to"	Chapman, Tim Marsh, Mark Wright	4:22
9.	"Sharayah"	Grant, Eaton	4:53
10.	"The Prodigal (I'll Be Waiting)"	Grant, Chapman, Robbie Buchanan	5:10

35th Anniversary Edition bonus tracks (limited edition vinyl and streaming services)
No.	Title	Length
1.	"Love of Another Kind" (live)	4:22
2.	"Find a Way" (live)	4:57
3.	"Wise Up" (live)	4:59
4.	"Fight" (live)	5:10
5.	"All the Burners" (commentary)	1:54
6.	"Caribou" (commentary)	2:19
7.	"Chip Up" (commentary)	1:56
8.	"There's a Time to Dance" (commentary)	1:42
9.	"Giant Figure-Eight" (commentary)	3:20

== Personnel ==
- Amy Grant – lead vocals, backing vocals (2, 3)
- Robbie Buchanan – Roland Jupiter 8 (1), synthesizer bass (1), synthesizers (2, 4–7, 10), sound effects (4), drum programming (4), synthesizer programming (5), Yamaha DX7 (8), acoustic piano (10), track arrangement (10)
- Shane Keister – synthesizers (1, 7, 9), acoustic piano (1), explosion (2), synthesizer programming (3), Yamaha GS1 (3, 8), Fender Rhodes (5), Memorymoog (6), Fairlight (8)
- Michael W. Smith – Yamaha GS2 (2, 3, 8), Memorymoog (3)
- Larry Williams – synthesizer (7), saxophone (7)
- Dann Huff – electric guitars, guitar solo (4, 5)
- Jon Goin – electric guitars (2–4, 6, 8, 9), acoustic guitar (10)
- Michael Landau – electric guitars (2, 4, 7, 9), guitar solo (10)
- Paul Jackson Jr. – electric guitars (7)
- Mike Brignardello – bass (2–9)
- Paul Leim – drums (1–3, 5–10), drum programming (4), drum overdubs (4), LinnDrum programming (7)
- Lenny Castro – percussion (2, 6, 8, 10)
- Bill Champlin – backing vocals (1, 7)
- Gary Chapman – backing vocals (1, 3, 6, 8)
- Tommy Funderburk – backing vocals (1, 2, 6, 7)
- Diana Hanna – backing vocals (1, 3, 8)
- Chris Harris – screams (1), backing vocals (8)
- Gary Pigg – screams (1), backing vocals (8)
- Kathy Burdick – screams (1)
- Tom Kelly – backing vocals (2, 4, 6, 9)
- Steve George – backing vocals (4, 9)
- Richard Page – backing vocals (4, 9)
- Chris Eaton – backing vocals (5)
- Kim Fleming – backing vocals (8)
- Donna McElroy – backing vocals (8)

== Production ==
- Michael Blanton – executive producer
- Dan Harrell – executive producer
- Gary Chapman – executive producer
- Brown Bannister – producer
- Jack Joseph Puig – engineer, mixing
- Kevin Burns – assistant engineer
- J.T. Cantwell – assistant engineer
- Steven Ford – assistant engineer
- Dan Garcia – assistant engineer
- Alan Henry – assistant engineer
- Richard Markowitz – assistant engineer
- Mike Ross – assistant engineer
- Clark Schleicher – assistant engineer
- Doug Sax – mastering at The Mastering Lab (Hollywood, California)
- Kent Hunter – art direction, design
- Mark Tucker – photography
- Ed James – album cover marketing pop in store
- Julie Miller – stylist

== In popular culture ==
"Who To Listen To" was featured in a second-season episode of Miami Vice ("The Dutch Oven" S02E03).

== Charts ==
=== Weekly charts ===
Year	Chart	Position
1985	200	35
1985	Australia (Kent Music Report)	59
1985	Top Contemporary Christian	1

=== Year-end charts ===
Year	Chart	Position
1985	U.S. Billboard Inspirational Albums	6
1986	U.S. Billboard Inspirational Albums	1
1987	U.S. Billboard Inspirational Albums	11

=== End-of-decade charts ===
Chart (1980–1989)	Rank
US Billboard Top Contemporary Christian	6

== Certifications ==
Region	Certification	Certified units/sales
Canada (Music Canada)	Gold	50,000^{^}
United States (RIAA)	Platinum	1,000,000^{^}
^{^} Shipments figures based on certification alone.

== Awards ==
GMA Dove Awards

Year	Winner	Category
1986	Unguarded	Recorded Music Packaging of the Year

Grammy Awards

Year	Winner	Category
1986	Unguarded	Best Gospel Performance, Female
