= Find a Way (Amy Grant song) =

Single by Amy Grant

from the album Unguarded
- B-side: "Angels"
- Released: 1985
- Genre: CCM, adult contemporary, pop
- Length: 3:28
- Label: A&M
- Songwriter(s): Amy Grant, Michael W. Smith
- Producer(s): Brown Bannister

Amy Grant singles chronology
"Tennessee Christmas" (1983)	"Find a Way" (1985)	"Everywhere I Go" (1985)

Music video
- "Find a Way" on YouTube

"Find a Way" is a 1985 single by Christian music singer Amy Grant. It was released as the first single from her Unguarded album. Also, "Find a Way" was Grant's first major single release, as it was issued in mainstream (non-religious) popular outlets by A&M Records along with the album. Although the single was released in both the United States and the United Kingdom with "It's Not a Song" as a B-side, it only charted in America.

"Find a Way" is an uptempo, inspirational song in which Grant encourages her listener, an "angry young woman", to persevere and stay optimistic despite life's trials, because "love will surely find a way."

== Background ==
Between 1982 and 1984, Amy Grant had become one of the most popular contemporary Christian singers to date. Her album Age to Age had become the best-selling Christian album up to that point; it became the first Christian album by a solo artist to be certified gold in 1983.

Although Grant never made public her intentions to crossover to mainstream music during this period, her success might have hinted at future decisions. When she penetrated the country charts in late 1983 with the holiday single "Tennessee Christmas", she managed to be nominated for an ACM award for Best New Female Vocalist. In 1985 she continued her success when she performed "Angels", a song from her 1984 album Straight Ahead, on the nationally televised Grammy Awards.

At this point, her record company had become convinced that she would be equally successful as a mainstream artist. They soon began negotiations with A&M Records to distribute their catalogue in non-religious outlets. The deal went into effect in January 1985 when A&M reissued Straight Ahead. Although it only peaked at No. 133 on the Billboard 200, it did go gold and was a bigger success than most Christian artists had at the time, and so she and her management decided to record a crossover album.

== Chart performance ==
"Find a Way" was released commercially in mainstream record shops in 1985 by A&M. Word chose, at the time, not to issue it commercially in Christian outlets, since most Christian singles at the time were released solely to radio stations.

Due to the extensive use of keyboards and synthesizers, "Find a Way" was a mainstream hit. It reached the Top 10 of the Adult Contemporary chart and the Top 30 of the pop chart. The album was fairly successful on the pop chart as well, reaching No. 35. In spite of accusations by longtime Christian fans that Grant had "crossed over" into pop , "Find a Way" was also the singer's fifth number-one Christian single.

== Track listing ==
"Find a Way"

Official versions

- Album Version - 3:28
- Ralphi Rosario Big Room Club Mix - 8:14
- Ralphi Rosario Big Room Mixshow Edit - 4:21
- Ralphi Rosario Big Room Radio Edit - 3:36
- Ralphi Rosario Big Room Remix - 6:44
- Ralphi Rosario Big Room Remix Instrumental - 6:44

== Personnel ==
- Amy Grant – lead and backing vocals
- Michael W. Smith – Yamaha GS2
- Robbie Buchanan – synthesizers
- Shane Keister – explosion
- Jon Goin – electric guitar
- Dann Huff – electric guitar
- Michael Landau – electric guitar
- Mike Brignardello – bass
- Paul Leim – drums
- Lenny Castro – percussion
- Tommy Funderburk – backing vocals
- Tom Kelly – backing vocals

== Music video ==
The song featured a music video that was played heavily on MTV and VH1, the first music video directed by television director and producer Thomas Schlamme. It was produced by Fred Seibert, Alan Goodman and Albie Hecht and commissioned by A&M Records creative director Richard Frankel. The video is included on the Find a Way VHS and LaserDisc and has not been released on DVD.

== Charts ==
Chart (1985)	Peak position
Australian (Kent Music Report)	98
Canadian RPM Adult Contemporary	1
US Billboard Christian	1
US Billboard Adult Contemporary	7
US Billboard Hot 100	29
