= Mary Lee's Corvette =

American band

- Genres: Alternative folk
- Years active: 1997–present
- Members: Mary Lee Kortes; Andy York; Joe Chiafolo; Jeremy Chatzky; Rod Hohl; Brad Albetta; Graham Hawthorne

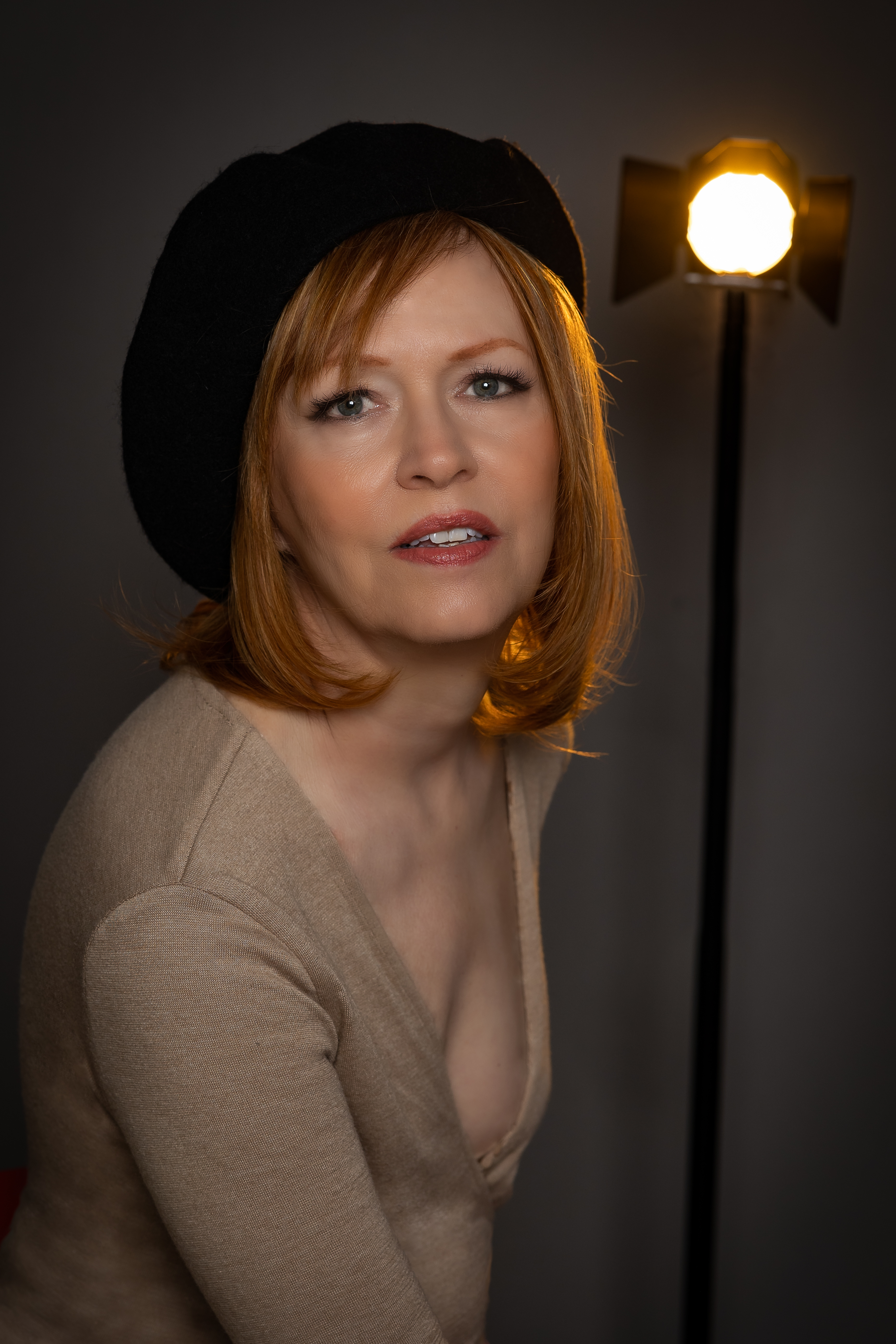
Mary Lee Kortes photo by Charles Chessler

Mary Lee's Corvette is an American band led by Michigan-born singer-songwriter Mary Lee Kortes. The group has recorded five albums, four of which have landed on Billboard magazine's year-end "best of" lists and primarily feature songs written or co-written by Kortes. The band's third album, Blood on the Tracks (2003), was a cover album of Bob Dylan's 1975 album of the same name.

== History ==
Mary Lee's Corvette was founded in New York City by singer-songwriter Mary Lee Kortes with fellow band members including Andy York (guitar) and Joe Chiofalo (accordion). Prior to forming the group, Kortes worked as a session singer with Freedy Johnston and Jewel. She has also written songs recorded by other artists; including "Everywhere I Go" which was recorded by Christian artist Amy Grant for her first A&M Records album Unguarded. She also penned the songs "Save Me" for Once Blue (Rebecca Martin and Jesse Harris) and "He Turned Me Out" for The Pointer Sisters.

MLC released their first album with the Montclair, New Jersey–based record company Ripe & Ready on January 21, 1997. Self titled Mary Lee's Corvette, the album was produced by Kortes's husband Eric Ambel. The recordings made for this album had originally been intended as a promotional sampler to market the group to clubs in New York. Several songs from that sampler were played by Philadelphia WXPN's music director Bruce Warren on the program "World Cafe", and received popular response from the public in that city. This response to the sampler led to the decision to release those same recordings as the band's first album in 1997. The album was included in the "best of" list for several Billboard magazine writers, including then Editor-in-Chief Timothy White and Jim Bessman. Following the album's release, the band toured for performances in Philadelphia, Baltimore, and Washington D.C. in addition to remaining active in the New York City circuit.

In 1998, MLC released the single "Lick the Sunshine" with Wild Pitch Records as a preview of music for the band's second album. In his review in Billboard, music critic Chuck Taylor wrote that the song was a "subtle, insistent invitation to shed the inhibitions of sudden mutual allure that is as magnetic as it is elemental. This second album, entitled True Lovers of Adventure, was released on March 23, 1999; and the songs "Need For Religion", "End of the Road", and "One More Sun" were described as "hits raring to go" by critic Paul Verne. Billboard critic Michael Paoletta listed it as one of the best albums of 1999.

In 2002, MLC recorded a cover album of Bob Dylan's Blood on the Tracks, recorded live at Arlene's Grocery. In his review of the album Rolling Stone critic David Fricke wrote that "the bright bite in Mary Lee Kortes' voice [has] the high-mountain sunshine of Dolly Parton, with a sweet-iron undercoat of Chrissie Hynde."

MLC's fourth album 700 Miles was released in 2003 and included mainly songs written or co-written by Kortes with the exception of a cover of Townes Van Zandt's "No Place To Fall". Jon Pareles of The New York Times wrote, "Transparency reigns in the songs of Mary Lee Kortes. On 700 Miles, her voice is clear, her lyrics direct and her music poised and tuneful. With flickers of wry humor, she sings about love and hopes and memories in songs so meticulously crafted they sound completely natural." Washington Post critic Mike Joyce noted the influence of both Bob Dylan and John Hiatt within her song writing on this album. He further stated that, "The uncluttered yet often imaginatively textured arrangements are a big plus, too, placing the focus where it ought to be—on Kortes's enchanting voice and tale-spinning." MLC toured the US, UK and Europe in support of the album, opening for Joe Jackson who later guested on Kortes's most recent release, Will Anybody Know That I Was Here: The Songs of Beulah Rowley.

MLC's fifth album Love, Loss & Lunacy was released in 2006 with Emergent Records. The band toured the United Kingdom as well as the United States for performances of this album's music.

In 2023, Kortes released Will Anybody Know That I Was Here: The Songs of Beulah Rowley. A concept album about a Depression-era singer and songwriter, the record was produced by Hal Willner, his last individual-artist album. The album has been called "quite simply, spectacular" by The Alternate Root and is set for UK and European release in 2024.

== Discography ==
- Mary Lee's Corvette (1997)
- True Lovers of Adventure (1999)
- Blood on the Tracks (2002)
- 700 Miles (2003)
- Love, Loss & Lunacy (2006)
- Will Anybody Know That I Was Here: The Songs of Beulah Rowley (2023)
