= Age to Age =

Studio album by Amy Grant
- Released: May 1, 1982
- Recorded: 1981–82
- Studios: Caribou Ranch (Nederland, Colorado); Gold Mine (Brentwood, Tennessee); Sound Stage (Nashville, Tennessee)
- Genre: Contemporary Christian music
- Length: 36:35
- Label: Myrrh
- Producer: Brown Bannister

Amy Grant chronology
In Concert Volume Two (1981)	Age to Age (1982)	Ageless Medley (1983)

Professional ratings
Review scores
Source	Rating
AllMusic	5/5 stars
Cross Rhythms	8/10 stars

Age to Age is the fourth studio album by Christian music singer Amy Grant, released in 1982 on Myrrh Records.

Age to Age was Amy Grant's breakthrough album, finally earning her serious recognition within the burgeoning Contemporary Christian music community as it ushered her into stardom, and also contributed to the creation of the mold for the modern Contemporary Christian music star. The hit success of the album's first two singles, "Sing Your Praise to the Lord," featuring a piano intro based on J.S. Bach's "Fugue No. 2 in C Minor" from The Well Tempered Clavier, Book 1, and "El Shaddai," saw its sales take off, selling well over a million copies. It became the first Christian music album by a solo artist to be certified gold in 1983, and the first ever platinum Christian music album in 1985.

The album was listed at No. 92 in the 2001 book, CCM Presents: The 100 Greatest Albums in Christian Music and it was one of the fastest-selling specifically Christian albums ever released. It sold about 5,000 to 6,000 copies a week on average, which was unheard of for a Christian album at the time. Dan Harrell, one of Grant's managers, claimed that it was the fastest selling record in her record company's history. It became so popular that it topped Billboard's Christian albums chart for 85 weeks, including the entire year of 1983, and was named Gospel Album of the 1980s by Billboard. The album title comes from a prominent lyric in one of the album's most prominent tracks, "El Shaddai".

== Track listing ==
No.	Title	Writer(s)	Length
1.	"In a Little While"	Amy Grant, Brown Bannister, Gary Chapman, Shane Keister	4:20
2.	"I Have Decided"	Michael Card	3:13
3.	"I Love a Lonely Day"	Chapman, Michael W. Smith	4:03
4.	"Don't Run Away"	Grant, Chapman	3:33
5.	"Fat Baby"	Steve Millikan, Rod Robison	2:09
6.	"Sing Your Praise to the Lord"	Rich Mullins	3:12
7.	"El Shaddai"	Card, John Thompson	4:05
8.	"Raining on the Inside"	Grant, Kathy Troccoli	4:10
9.	"Got to Let It Go"	Grant, Bannister, Chapman, Keister, Smith	4:00
10.	"Arms of Love"	Grant, Chapman, Smith	3:10

== Personnel ==
- Amy Grant – lead vocals
- Michael W. Smith – keyboards
- Shane Keister – keyboards
- Jon Goin – guitars
- Mike Brignardello – bass
- Paul Leim – drums
- Terry McMillan – percussion
- Farrell Morris – percussion
- Sheldon Kurland – strings
- Gene Meros – saxophone
- Denis Solee – saxophone
- Bobby Taylor – woodwinds
- Cindy Reynolds – harp
- Lori Brooks – backing vocals
- Jackie Cusic – backing vocals
- Diana DeWitt – backing vocals
- Phil Forrest – backing vocals
- Gary Chapman – backing vocals
- Pam Mark Hall – backing vocals
- Dennis Henson – backing vocals
- Alan Moore – backing vocals, arrangements, vocal arrangements (5, 9)
- Gary Pigg – backing vocals
- Kathy Troccoli – backing vocals

Production

- Michael Blanton – executive producer
- Dan Harrell – executive producer
- Brown Bannister – producer
- Jack Joseph Puig – engineer
- Mixed at Mama Jo's Recording Studios (Los Angeles, California)
- Steve Hall – mastering at MCA (Whitney, California)
- Dennis Hill – design
- Mike Borum – photography

== Videos ==
A live concert video cassette and LaserDisc was released by A&M Records which includes seven of this album's songs. A music video was produced for "Don't Run Away" featuring Michael W. Smith as the piano player.

== Chart history ==
=== Weekly charts ===
Year	Chart	Position
1983	Top Contemporary Christian	1

=== Year-end charts ===
Year	Chart	Position
1984	U.S. Billboard Inspirational Albums	1
1985	U.S. Billboard Inspirational Albums	5
1986	U.S. Billboard Inspirational Albums	5
1987	U.S. Billboard Inspirational Albums	21

== Certifications and sales ==
Region	Certification	Certified units/sales
Canada (Music Canada)	Gold	50,000^{^}
United States (RIAA)	Platinum	1,000,000^{^}
^{^} Shipments figures based on certification alone.

== Accolades ==
GMA Dove Awards

Year	Winner	Category
1983	"El Shaddai"	Song of the Year
1983	Michael Card (for "El Shaddai")	Songwriter of the Year
1983	Age to Age	Pop/Contemporary Album of the Year
1983	Age to Age	Recorded Music Packaging of the Year

Grammy Awards

Year	Winner	Category
1983	Age to Age	Best Gospel Performance, Contemporary
