= In Concert Volume Two (Amy Grant album) =

Live album by Amy Grant
- Released: November 1981
- Genre: Contemporary Christian music
- Length: 37:08
- Label: Myrrh
- Producer: Brown Bannister

Amy Grant chronology
In Concert (1981)	In Concert Volume Two (1981)	Age to Age (1982)

Professional ratings
Review scores
Source	Rating
AllMusic	4/5 stars
Cross Rhythms	7/10 stars

In Concert Volume Two is a live album by Christian singer Amy Grant, released in 1981.

In Concert Volume Two was the second album of a double live set, the other being In Concert, which was released earlier that year. Although the two should have been issued as a double album, budget problems forced the two to be released separately. In Concert Volume Two featured four new songs: "I'm Gonna Fly" (which became a Top Ten Christian radio hit), "You Gave Me Love" (a cover of the BJ Thomas song), "Fill Me With Your Love", and "Nobody Loves Me Like You" with DeGarmo & Key (originally on their 1980 album This Ain't Hollywood).

In 2007, In Concert Volume Two was reissued and digitally remastered by Grant's new record label, EMI/Sparrow Records. The remastered edition is labeled with a "Digitally Remastered" logo in the 'gutter' on the CD front.

== Track listing ==
No.	Title	Writer(s)	Length
1.	"I'm Gonna Fly"	Amy Grant	4:12
2.	"Too Late"	Grant, Brown Bannister, Chris Christian	4:43
3.	"So Glad"	Grant, Bannister, Christian	4:57
4.	"You Gave Me Love"	Claire Cloninger, Archie Jordan	3:17
5.	"Fill Me With Your Love"	Gary Chapman	2:44
6.	"What a Difference You've Made"	Jordan	2:33
7.	"If I Have to Die"	Grant	3:31
8.	"That's the Day"	Bruce Hibbard, Hadley Hockensmith, Kelly Willard	3:39
9.	"Look What Has Happened to Me"	Bannister, Chapman	3:12
10.	"Keep It On Going"	Grant	1:03
11.	"Nobody Loves Me Like You Do" (with DeGarmo & Key)	Eddie DeGarmo, Dana Key	3:26

== Personnel ==
- Amy Grant – lead vocals
- Eddie DeGarmo – keyboards
- Gerry Peters – Oberheim OB-X synthesizer
- Dana Key – electric guitars, backing vocals
- Billy Sprague – acoustic guitars, backing vocals
- Mike Brignardello – bass guitar
- Greg Morrow – drums
- David Durham – backing vocals
- Theresa Ellis – backing vocals
- Jan Harris – backing vocals
- Gary Pigg – backing vocals

Production

- Michael Blanton – executive producer
- Dan Harrell – executive producer
- Brown Bannister – producer
- Jack Joseph Puig – engineer, mixing
- Malcolm Harper – mobile recording
- Glenn Wexler – cover photography
