= Michael Boggs (musician) =

- Also known as: Boggsy
- Born: Michael Dean Boggs; November 8, 1978 (age 47); Tulsa, Oklahoma
- Origin: Franklin, Tennessee
- Genres: Worship, CCM, Christian rock, Christian alternative rock, country gospel, pop rock
- Occupations: Singer, songwriter, guitarist, worship pastor
- Instruments: vocals, singer-songwriter, guitar
- Years active: 1999–2007 (with band); 2007–present (solo)
- Labels: Stylos, In:ciite
- Website: michaelboggs.com

Michael Dean Boggs (born November 8, 1978) is an American Christian musician, guitarist, and worship pastor, who mainly plays Christian pop. His nickname was "Boggsy", while he was with FFH. He has released two studio albums, More Than Moved in 2010 with In:ciite Media and More Like a Lion in 2014 with Stylos Records, while he released, an extended play, More Like a Lion in 2013, with Stylos Records. He was awarded the Dove Award for Songwriter of the Year, in 2012.

== Early and personal life ==
Boggs was born, Michael Dean Boggs, on November 8, 1978, in Tulsa, Oklahoma, where he started playing music by drumming "on pots and pans with pencils", while his father joined in playing a guitar and singing. During his tenure with FFH, he was in the process of obtaining a theology degree. He is married to his girlfriend from Oklahoma, Keely, who is an Oklahoma State University graduate, being a former elementary school teacher. They relocated to Franklin, Tennessee, for her husband to pursue his musical ambitions, where he joined FFH, in 1999. Boggs is currently the worship minister at Rejoice Church in Owasso, OK.

== Music career ==
His music career started in 1999, with the band FFH, where he was their guitarist and background vocalist, for eight years from 1999 until 2007, when he commenced his worship leading and individual singing and songwriting career. He released, More Than Moved, a studio album, on October 19, 2010, from In:ciite Media. The subsequent release, an extended play, More Like a Lion, was released on September 24, 2013, by Stylos Records. His second studio album, More Like a Lion, was released on March 25, 2014, with Stylos Records. Boggs was awarded with the Dove Award for Songwriter of the Year, in 2012.

== Discography ==
Studio albums

- More Than Moved (October 19, 2010, In:ciite)
- More Like a Lion (March 24, 2014, Stylos)

EPs

- More Like a Lion (September 24, 2013, Stylos)
