= Rochambeau =

Rochambeau or Ro-Sham-Bo may refer to:

== Arts and media ==
- "Roshambo", a song by The Network
- Another name for the game of rock–paper–scissors
- A game similar to "sack tapping" played by characters on the animated TV show South Park
- A 1992 album by the band Farside
- Ro Sham Bo (album), 1994 album by The Grays

== People ==
- Jean-Baptiste Donatien de Vimeur, comte de Rochambeau (1725–1807), French nobleman and soldier who participated in the American Revolutionary War
- Donatien-Marie-Joseph de Vimeur, vicomte de Rochambeau (1755–1813), French soldier, the son of Jean-Baptiste Donatien de Vimeur, comte de Rochambeau

== Places ==
- Cayenne – Rochambeau Airport in French Guiana
- Rochambeau, a building in Washington D.C. designed by Thomas Franklin Schneider
- Rochambeau Middle School in Connecticut
- Rochambeau Monument, a statue in Newport, Rhode Island
- Rochambeau French International School, a private French international school in Maryland
- Rochambeau Library-Providence Community Library, a historic public library in Providence, Rhode Island
- Rochambeau Worsted Company Mill, a historic textile mill in Providence, Rhode Island

== Ships ==
- French ironclad Rochambeau, originally USS Dunderberg, a French Navy ironclad 1867–1872
- SS Rochambeau, a French transatlantic liner 1911–1934
- USS Rochambeau, a US Navy troopship during World War II
