= Presents Author Unknown =

Studio album by Jason Falkner
- Released: August 13, 1996
- Recorded: Winter 1995
- Studio: Mad Hatter Studios
- Genres: Power pop; pop; indie rock
- Length: 44:17
- Label: Elektra Entertainment
- Producer: Jason Falkner

Jason Falkner chronology
Presents Author Unknown (1996)	Can You Still Feel? (1999)

Singles from Presents Author Unknown
- 1. "I Live" Released: 1996; 2. "Miracle Medicine" Released: 1996; 3. "Follow Me" Released: 1997

Presents Author Unknown (sometimes simply, Author Unknown) is the debut studio album by Jason Falkner (formerly of The Three O'Clock, Jellyfish, and The Grays), released on August 13, 1996 by Elektra Entertainment.

Save for the string arrangements, and a guitar overdub by Alain Johannes on the track "Miracle Medicine", Falkner performs every instrument on the album.

The album was supported by singles for the songs "I Live", "Miracle Medicine", and "Follow Me". Despite receiving critical acclaim from contemporary critics, the album was a commercial disappointment, which Falkner has attributed to a lack of promotion from his label Elektra.

== Background and release ==
=== Departure from Jellyfish and The Grays ===
Before the recording of Presents Author Unknown, Falkner was the lead guitarist for the San Francisco-based power pop band, Jellyfish. He left the group shortly after the promotional tour for the group's 1990 debut, Bellybutton, due to a lack of promised songwriting credits and lead vocals on the group's songs. After quitting, Falkner reluctantly joined the band The Grays. The group released one record, entitled Ro Sham Bo, in 1994. The band split due to the album's unsuccessful commercial performance. Due to Falkner's previous experiences with bands and his desire to have complete control of his music, he plays nearly all of the instruments on his debut album. The album was recorded over a two-and-a-half month period in the winter of 1995 at Madhatter Studios.

=== Release and promotion ===
The album was released on August 13, 1996 on Elektra Entertainment. The album was supported with singles for the songs “I Live”, “Miracle Medicine”, and “Follow Me”. No music videos were released in support of the album.

== Compositions ==
In an article for HuffPost, writer Tony Sachs describes the album's sound as combining “classic ‘60s songcraft, elements of ‘70s glam-rock, and the new-wave sheen of the ‘80s” while “sounding completely contemporary.”

The album opens with the song “I Live” which Matthew Greenwald of AllMusic describes as “a cross between a mid-'70s Raspberries-like power pop sheen and a modernist approach.” The song is an “emotionally direct love song” that uses a descending melody for the chorus. Greenwald called the track “one of his finest, hook-laden rockers” and “one of the great pop moments of the 1990s.”

After the tracks “Miracle Medicine” and “Hectified”, the album continues with the song “Don’t Show Me Heaven” that has been described as using “a comfortable, mid-tempo, power pop melodic base” and “an almost tribal, psychedelic rhythm and series of hooks” to create “an ominous atmosphere that is inescapable.” The song utilizes “ambient sounds, some classical piano flourishes, and an almost Pete Townshend-inspired chord progression” which creates what has been described as “a monolith of sound”. The song's lyrical composition has been interpreted to be about love, with flourishes of mortality and reincarnation.

The song “Before My Heart Attacks” has been described as a mix between “pop, folk, and classical”. It has been compared to the early work of Randy Newman and Harry Nilsson. The lyrics pertain to isolation which is juxtaposed by the song's “subdued yet powerful string arrangement”.

== Critical reception ==
Professional ratings
Review scores
Source	Rating
AllMusic	4.5/5 stars
The Austin Chronicle	3.5/4 stars
The Boston Phoenix	3/4 stars
Chicago Tribune	3/4 stars
The Encyclopedia of Popular Music	4/5 stars
Mojo	4/5 stars
MusicHound Rock	4.5/5 stars
Uncut	4/5 stars

The album has received critical acclaim from contemporary music critics. Mindy Labernz of The Austin Chronicle described the album as "melodious, harmony-laden, and sumptuously produced." She continues by stating that, "His songs are not sanitized by their own perfection, nor do they bury emotions under layers of puns and fictions." To summarize, she says that "Falkner struggles not to make things too familiar. When he wants to seduce the listener, though, as on the wrenching "She Goes to Bed," he is epic. So is much of this album." Brad Webber of the Chicago Tribune, states that Presents Author Unknown "harks to the days when albums were packed with great songs rather than one hit and filler." He continues by saying that "he also takes on a multitude of styles -- neopsychedelia to the near-psychotic." He finishes by saying the album "squarely establishes him as a one-man pop combo with great verve."

In a retrospective review for AllMusic, Tim Sendra wrote, “Writing, producing, singing, and playing nearly everything except the occasional guitar overdub (and strings), Jason has released a one-man pop tour de force. Hooks abound and won't let you down. The more you listen, the more you'll find yourself humming along. Standout tracks include "I Go Astray" and "Don't Show Me Heaven," but all are worthy of a listen. It's good ol' pop music. Better still, it's good music.”

== Commercial performance ==
Despite the album’s critical success, Author Unknown was a commercial disappointment. By May 1997, the album had only sold 6,000 copies in the United States, according to Nielsen SoundScan. Falkner has attributed this to a lack of proper promotion on behalf of his label, Elektra. The label did not provide Falkner with a band to tour in promotion of the album. In an article for The Guardian, Michael Hann argued that the album’s lack of success was due to the fact that Falkner was “...too pretty to be a proper rocker, too tough to be pop, too eccentric for the jocks, too straightforward for the arty people.” After an attempt to be dropped by the label, Falkner was convinced to stay. Falkner eventually left the label after the release of his sophomore follow-up, Can You Still Feel?.

== Track listing ==
All songs written and composed by Jason Falkner.

No.	Title	Length
1.	"I Live"	3:11
2.	"Miracle Medicine"	3:26
3.	"Hectified"	2:44
4.	"Don’t Show Me Heaven"	4:15
5.	"She Goes to Bed"	4:16
6.	"Nobody Knows"	4:06
7.	"Follow Me"	4:07
8.	"Before My Heart Attacks"	3:43
9.	"Afraid Himself to Be"	3:41
10.	"Miss Understanding"	2:58
11.	"I Go Astray"	3:49
12.	"Untitled"	4:02
Total length:		44:17

== Personnel ==
Personnel per liner notes.

- Jason Falkner — vocals, instruments, string arrangements, mixing (tracks: 2, 4, 6 to 12), production
- Alain Johannes — guitar on “Miracle Medicine”
- Charlie Barnett — string arrangements
- Jack Joseph Puig — mixing (tracks: 1 and 4, assisted by Jack Champagne)
- Jim Ebert — mixing (tracks: 2, 4, 6 to 12)
- Arthur Smilios — mixing on “Hectified” (assisted by Doug Trantrow and Steve Fitzmaurice)
- Andrea Byers, David Stone, David Strenske, Larry Corbett, Nancy Roth, Norman Hughes, Peter Kent, Scott Haupert, and Suzie Katayama — string accompaniment
