= Brian Kehew =

- Born: September 22, 1964 (age 61)
- Genres: Rock
- Occupations: Musician; producer
- Instrument: Keyboards

Brian Kehew (born September 22, 1964) is an American musician and record producer. He is a member of the Moog Cookbook and co-author of the Recording the Beatles book, an in-depth look at the Beatles' studio approach.

== Live performances and recordings ==
Kehew performed on keyboards with the Who on portions of their 2006–07 touring schedule. He has worked as an instrument technician (primarily keyboards) for the Who's live performances beginning in 2002, and filled in on keyboards during absences of John Bundrick from the tour. Earlier live performances include appearances with the French electronic-based band Air, Hole, and Dave Davies.

Kehew is also known for his band the Moog Cookbook (partnered with former Jellyfish keyboardist Roger Joseph Manning Jr.), which released two eclectic albums, The Moog Cookbook and Ye Olde Space Bande. The Moog Cookbook recreated well-known songs using vintage keyboard synthesizers. In 2006, the Moog Cookbook independently released a collection of previously unreleased material under the title, Bartell.

== Production, engineering, and mixing ==
Kehew co-produced Fiona Apple's album Extraordinary Machine. He also worked in studio with artists such as Eels, Eleni Mandell, Aimee Mann, Matthew Sweet, Michael Penn, Andrew Sandoval, Beck, and Jon Brion and Megan E. Blake. Mixing work includes Aretha Franklin, Talking Heads, Little Feat, Fleetwood Mac, Ramones, the Pretenders, Morrissey, Alice Cooper, the Faces, Eagles, Black Sabbath, Emerson, Lake & Palmer, the Stooges, MC5, Yes, Elvis Costello, Judee Sill, Rasputina, Crazy Horse, Tiny Tim, Gene Clark, Stone Temple Pilots and Saviour Machine.

== Writing, consulting, and collecting ==
With co-author Kevin Ryan, Kehew spent 15 years researching and writing Recording the Beatles. Published in 2006, the book is a detailed documentation of the personnel, equipment, and processes involved in the Beatles studio work. The book has received strong praise from Beatle historian Mark Lewisohn and many of the engineers who worked on Beatle sessions, including Norman Smith, Ken Townsend, Alan Parsons, Ken Scott, John Kurlander, Martin Benge, and Richard Lush. Kehew has also written articles for Tape Op, Keyboard Magazine, and Beatlefan magazines.

Kehew does consulting and programming work for music equipment manufacturers, including contributions to the Moog Minimoog Voyager, and Little Phatty synthesizers, moogerfooger pedals and Alesis Andromeda, Ion and Fusion synthesizers.

Kehew's collection of synthesizers and electronic musical instruments includes vintage machines, including three Mellotrons, two Chamberlins, a Crumar GDS, and two Con Brio, Inc. synthesizers, the ADS-200 and ADS-200R.

He graduated magna cum laude from California State University, Dominguez Hills in 1987.

In the past, Kehew has served as the Archives Historian for the Bob Moog Foundation, a non-profit whose goal is to preserve the archives of Dr. Robert Moog and to teach children about science, music, and innovation.

In 2017 Kehew began working on the restoration of Raymond Scott's Electronium.

== Discography ==
=== The Who ===
- Encore Series 2006 [November 4–5 & November 10 – December 11] (2006)
- Encore Series 2007 [March 22–26] (2007)
