= Robo-Sapiens =

Studio album by Malibu
- Released: April 18, 2007 (Japan); November 5, 2007 (worldwide)
- Recorded: 2003–2005
- Genre: Electronica
- Length: 72:11
- Label: Pony Canyon (Japan); Expansion Team Records (worldwide)

CD booklet cover

Robo-Sapiens is the debut album by Malibu, the electronica/remix project of Roger Joseph Manning Jr., released in Japan only on April 18, 2007 by Pony Canyon. The album was subsequently released outside Japan with a revised track listing on November 5, 2007 by Expansion Team Records.

The album includes the TV Eyes track "She Gets Around", which was originally released as the B-side of the "She's a Study" 12-inch single in 2003.

== Track listing ==
=== Japanese release (CD) ===
All songs written by Roger Joseph Manning Jr., except where noted.

1. "Yesteryear" – 5:37
2. "Please Don't Go" – 4:20
3. "The Bounce" – 6:22
4. "German Oil" – 6:19
5. "Animal Lovin' Ken" – 6:12
6. "Parisian Nights" – 5:10
7. "Sidekicks" – 7:16
8. "Rubber Tubes" – 5:35
9. "She Gets Around" (Jason Falkner/Manning Jr./Brian Reitzell) – 6:25
10. "D.I.E.T." – 6:34
11. "Time to Time" – 5:06
12. "Whips & Chains on the Astral Plane" – 7:15 (bonus track)

=== Worldwide release (CD) ===
All songs written by Roger Joseph Manning Jr., except where noted.

1. "Yesteryear" – 5:34
2. "The Bounce" – 6:19
3. "German Oil" – 6:19
4. "Sidekicks" – 7:13
5. "She Gets Around" (Jason Falkner/Manning Jr./Brian Reitzell) – 6:21
6. "Rubber Tubes" – 5:33
7. "Parisian Nights" – 5:09
8. "Animal Lovin' Ken" – 6:12
9. "Time to Time" – 5:05
10. "D.I.E.T." – 6:31
11. "Please Don't Go" - 4:20

== Personnel ==
Musicians

- Malibu - all sounds
- Jason Falkner - additional guitar and keyboard
- Brian Reitzell - additional percussive programming

Production

- Mixing and masterering by John Paterno
- Recorded at Stu-Stu-Studio
- Artwork and design: Adaptor
- Synthesizer restoration: Kevin Lightner and Ed Miller
