= T.V. Eye =

T.V. Eye may refer to:

- "T.V. Eye", a 1970 song by The Stooges, released on their second studio album Fun House
- TV Eye Live 1977, a 1978 live album by Iggy Pop
- TV Eyes, an American synthpop group
