= Roger Joseph Manning Jr. =

American musician (born 1966)

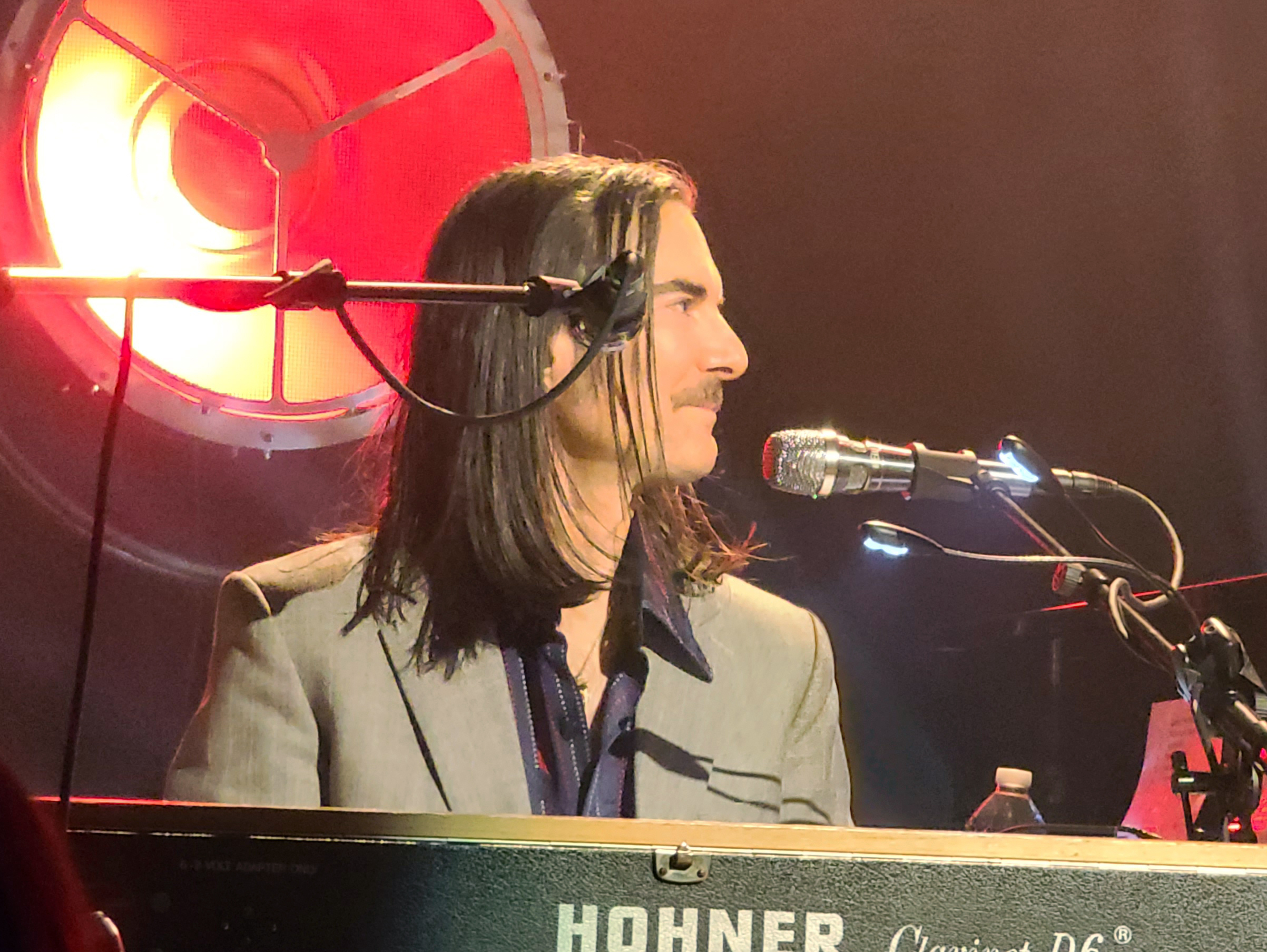
- Manning playing keyboards at Beck's semi-acoustic show at Irving Plaza in New York City on November 9, 2021.

Background information
- Also known as: Meco Eno; Malibu
- Born: May 27, 1966 (age 60)
- Origin: Los Angeles, California, U.S.
- Genres: Pop; rock; electronic
- Occupations: Musician; singer; songwriter; arranger
- Instruments: Keyboards; piano; vocals; guitar; bass; percussion
- Years active: 1988–present
- Website: rogerjosephmanningjrofficial.com

Roger Joseph Manning Jr. (born May 27, 1966) is an American keyboardist, singer, and songwriter who co-founded the bands Jellyfish, the Moog Cookbook, Imperial Drag, and The Lickerish Quartet. He has also spent several years as a member of Beck's backing band, contributed to several recordings by the band Air, and toured or recorded with acts such as Jay-Z, Blink 182, and Johnny Cash. In 2005, he released his first solo record, Solid State Warrior, followed with Robo-Sapiens (as "Malibu", 2007), Catnip Dynamite (2008), and Glamping (2018). He is usually credited by his full name to avoid confusion with the folk musician Roger Manning.

== Early life ==
Roger Joseph Manning Jr. was born May 27, 1966, the first child of Roger Manning, a businessman for Monroe Calculators, and Jane DeLara, a schoolteacher. He has two brothers: Chris (born October 6, 1968) and Tim (born September 10, 1970). The family later moved from Valencia, California to Pleasanton. As a child, Roger was enamored with ragtime music and took piano lessons; later he taught himself to play the drums. The first records he bought with his own money were Kiss' Alive! (1975) and the Beach Boys' Endless Summer (1974).

== Career ==
=== Jellyfish ===
Manning attended Amador Valley High School in Pleasanton in the 1980s. There, he met drummer Andy Sturmer. After graduating, Manning moved to Los Angeles and enrolled at USC to study musical composition. He involved himself with the local scene and began auditioning for various bands. He later joined Sturmer in the San Francisco band Beatnik Beatch. Sturmer was the group's drummer, singer, and songwriter, while Manning was keyboardist. The duo soon began collaborating with one another, writing compositions that were stylistically different from the songs the band was producing at the time. In August 1989, a year after Atlantic Records released Beatnik Beatch's eponymous debut album, Manning and Sturmer left the group to continue songwriting with one another and formed the band Jellyfish.

Jellyfish released two albums: Bellybutton (1990) and Spilt Milk (1993), whose combined sales totaled over 269,000 copies. During this era, Sturmer and Manning worked with Ringo Starr, for his 1992 solo album Time Takes Time, and Brian Wilson of the Beach Boys. Wilson and Jellyfish had one songwriting session and it was unproductive; Manning described the experience as "utterly surreal". By 1994, Manning and Sturmer were drifting apart musically, and in May, the San Francisco Chronicle reported that Jellyfish had disintegrated due to "creative differences". Afterward, Manning formed the short-lived glam outfit Imperial Drag with ex-Jellyfish guitarist Eric Dover.

=== The Moog Cookbook ===
Manning formed the Moog Cookbook with sound engineer Brian Kehew shortly after the demise of Jellyfish. It was conceived as both a parody of and tribute to the novelty Moog records of the late 1960s and early 1970s, which featured cover versions of popular songs using the then-new Moog synthesizer. Manning recalled that "When Brian and I finally met, we knew we had to do this, because we knew we could do it right, and we knew we had the resources — before someone else did it, and did it wrong." On stage and in their promotional materials, the band donned space-suit disguises that were similar to outfits worn by another emerging electronic duo, Daft Punk. This was reportedly only a coincidence.

Moog Cookbook released two records, The Moog Cookbook (1996) and Ye Olde Space Bande (1997), before disbanding in 1998. According to Manning: "As creatively fulfilling as it was, Moog Cookbook was not financially viable. We weren't coming out of rave culture and house music like Daft Punk." Music journalist Brian Chidester commented that the band "yielded solid overseas sales amidst the retro-obsessed landscape of Pulp Fiction, the Swing revival and thrift shop mania. The duo even ... found a small domestic audience attuned to similar electronic psych-pop coming out of Europe by bands like Stereolab, Mouse on Mars and the High Llamas."

=== The Lickerish Quartet ===
In 2017, Manning reached out to his former Jellyfish bandmates Tim Smith and Eric Dover to form another group, The Lickerish Quartet. Manning's goal was "to continue with the tradition of a lot of the pop/rock stylings" as well as to get to know the two better as songwriters. Manning considers The Lickerish Quartet's activities to be "like picking up where we left off in many ways". Initially, the trio did not intend to record; rather, they wanted to have small writing sessions. Eventually, though, they wrote and recorded twelve songs, which are being spread across 3 EPs (titled Vol. 1, Vol. 2, and Vol. 3) through 2020 and 2021, with the releases being joined by singles from the EPs. Session drummer Jeremy Stacey joined to augment the trio on the recordings. Andy Sturmer, however, wasn't invited to work with them due to his reluctance to work within the music industry.

=== Solo ===
In early 2006, Manning released his first solo album in Japan only: Solid State Warrior. He credited it under his full name to avoid confusion with the folk musician Roger Manning. It was subsequently issued in the U.S. under a different title, The Land of Pure Imagination, along with an altered song content. The album included one of the songs Manning wrote with Brian Wilson, "Wish it Would Rain", albeit with Wilson's contributions omitted.

In March 2008, Manning released his second solo album, Catnip Dynamite, in Japan only. It was released in the U.S. on February 3, 2009 with the addition of three bonus tracks that were recorded during a live performance at Fujifest in Japan.

In 2019 Manning co-wrote and performed background vocals on the song "You'll Never Guess What Happened Today" with internet pioneer Jaye Muller, a.k.a. "Count Jaye" for his 2019 album release.

== Discography ==
=== Solo and collaborative ===
- Logan's Sanctuary (2000) (Roger Manning & Brian Reitzell)
- Solid State Warrior (2005) (also released as The Land of Pure Imagination)
- Robo-Sapiens (2007) (Malibu)
- Catnip Dynamite (2008)
- Glamping (2018)
- Radio Daze & Glamping (2023)
- Hopium (2026)

=== With bands ===
Beatnik Beatch

- Beatnik Beatch (1988)

Jellyfish

- Bellybutton (1990)
- Spilt Milk (1993)

Imperial Drag

- Imperial Drag (1996)

The Moog Cookbook

- The Moog Cookbook (1996)
- Ye Olde Space Bande (1997)
- Bartell (2005)

Oxbow

- Love's Holiday (2023)

TV Eyes

- TV Eyes (2006)

The Lickerish Quartet

- Threesome Vol. 1 (2020)
- Threesome Vol. 2 (2021)
- Threesome Vol. 3 (2022)
- Fables From Fearless Heights (2022) (collects all three EP's plus two bonus cover songs: "So Like Candy" and "Sugar Me")

Appearances

- Esa Linna – This Is Who I Am (2013)
- Esa Linna – She's Not a Human Being (2012)
- Marianas Trench – "Echoes of You" (on the album Phantoms, 2019)
- Justice – "Incognito" (on the album Hyperdrama, 2024)
