= All Quiet on the Noise Floor =

Studio album by Jason Falkner
- Released: September 2, 2009
- Recorded: 2009
- Genre: Power pop; indie rock
- Length: 48:03
- Label: Noise McCartney
- Producer: Kazutoshi Chiba (exec.); Jason Falkner

Jason Falkner chronology
| Bedtime with the Beatles: Part Two (2008) | All Quiet on the Noise Floor (2009) | Make It Be (2015) |

All Quiet on the Noise Floor is the fourth studio album by American musician Jason Falkner, released in Japan on September 2, 2009 on Noise McCartney Records.

The album was exclusively released in Japan; a U.S. release was tentatively scheduled for the end of 2009 but never occurred. It has since seen digital release for download and streaming. One edition of the record included a DVD that featured a July 28, 2008 performance and "rehearsal footage with Quruli before the Fuji Rock Festival." All instruments on the album were played by Falkner.

== Track listing ==
All tracks are written by Jason Falkner, except where noted.

| No. | Title | Writer(s) | Length |
|---|---|---|---|
| 1. | "Princessa" | | 4:20 |
| 2. | "Emotion Machine" | | 3:12 |
| 3. | "Counting Sheep" | | 3:58 |
| 4. | "Evangeline" | | 4:02 |
| 5. | "The Lie In Me" | | 5:17 |
| 6. | "Maybe the Universe" | | 3:50 |
| 7. | "Jet Silver and the Dolls of Venus" | Bill Nelson | 4:01 |
| 8. | "My Home is Not a House" | | 5:16 |
| 9. | "Doin' Me In" | | 3:49 |
| 10. | "Y.E.S" | | 5:29 |
| 11. | "This Time '09" (Japan bonus track) |

== Personnel ==
- Jason Falkner - vocals, instrumentation, noise, production, photography, engineering, mixing
- Pete Lyman - mastering
- Kazutoshi Chiba - executive production
- Christy Hindenlang - photography

Personnel per AllMusic

== Notes ==
- A version of "Princessa" has been available for streaming on Falkner's Myspace page.
- "My Home is Not a House" was previously recorded during Falkner's time with The Grays and is available on Necessity: The 4-Track Years.
- "Jet Silver and the Dolls of Venus" is a cover of a Be-Bop Deluxe song.
- "This Time" was originally released on Falkner's I'm OK, You're OK.
