= Wedgie =

Forcibly pulling a person's underpants

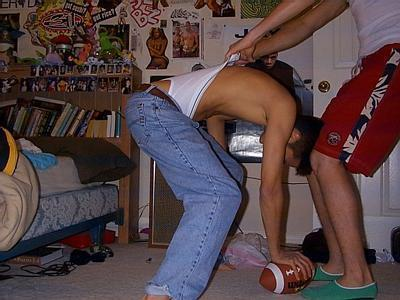
A male being given a wedgie by another person

A wedgie is the act of forcibly pulling a person's underpants upwards from the back, thus forcing the fabric between the buttocks uncomfortably. The act is often performed as a school prank or a form of bullying.

Wedgies are commonly featured in popular works, either as a form of low comedy or as a behaviour representative of bullying. In such works, briefs are usually the type of underpants that are worn by the victim.

The same term can also refer to the situation wherein any clothing worn over the buttocks randomly becomes wedged between them.

== Dangers ==
Wedgies, especially when performed on males, can be dangerous, potentially causing testicular or scrotal damage. An incident in 2004 involving a ten-year-old boy required reattachment of a testicle to the scrotum.

== Variations ==
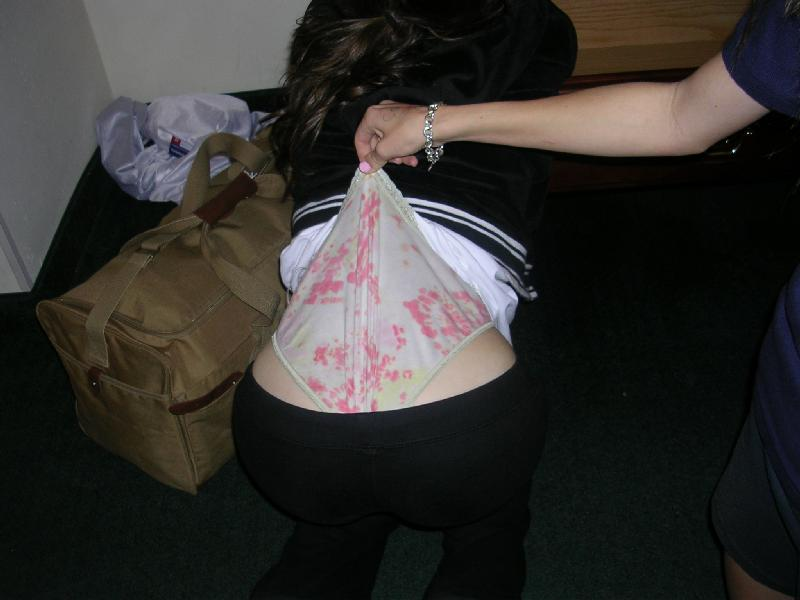
A female receiving a regular wedgie.

There are various versions of the traditional wedgie that can be used as pranks or a form of bullying. It is impractical to list every variant, as the names and processes can be rather subjective; however, below are a few better-known variants of the wedgie.

- The melvin is a variant where the victim's underpants are pulled up from the front, to cause injury, or, at least, severe pain to the victim's genitals.
- The atomic wedgie entails hoisting the waistband of the receiver's underwear up and over their head, which on at least one occasion has been lethal.
- The hanging wedgie is where the victim is hung by their underpants, elevated above the ground.
- The ripping wedgie involves the tearing of the victim's underpants, sometimes ripping off a portion of them (such as the waistband), or forcibly removing the garment entirely.

== In popular culture ==
The word "wedgie" gained popularity in the novel series Captain Underpants, especially its 5th book, Captain Underpants and the Wrath of the Wicked Wedgie Woman.

== See also ==
- List of practical joke topics
  - Happy corner
  - Indian burn
- Wedgies, a 2008 mini series-focused block on Cartoon Network
