= Yesteryear =

Yesteryear may refer to:

- The previous year
- Nostalgia, years gone by
- Yesteryear, a 2026 novel by Caro Claire Burke

== Film and television ==
- "Yesteryear" (Star Trek: The Animated Series), a 1973 episode of the animated series Star Trek
- Yesteryear (documentary series), a 1979 HBO documentary series follow up to Time Was

== Music ==
- Yesteryear (quartet), a barbershop quartet
- Yesteryear (album), or the title track, by Cosmo's Midnight, 2020
- "Yesteryear", a 2007 song by Malibu from Robo-Sapiens
- "Yesteryear", a 2011 song by the Dears from Degeneration Street

== See also ==
- Ballade des dames du temps jadis, whose refrain's English translation "where are the snows of yesteryear?" popularized yesteryear
- Yesteryear Village, a history park and exhibit in West Palm Beach, Florida
- Voyage from Yesteryear, a 1982 science fiction novel by James P. Hogan
