= Cyber Manhunt =

- Game Cover
- Developer: studio Aluba
- Producer: XUN JIANG。
- Designers: NAINAI, XUANZHI QIN, HANXIAO PU
- Programmers: WENQING REN, XIANGZHUANG
- Artists: JUN SUN, SHUPING ZHU, RENQIONG CONG, XIAOJING TIAN
- Composer: SIBO YAN
- Engine: Unity
- Platforms: Android; iOS; macOS; Windows
- Release: macOS, Windows: WW: 3 February 2021; Android, iOS: CN: 13 January 2023
- Genre: Puzzle game
- Mode: Single-player

Cyber Manhunt is a narrative-driven puzzle game developed by the Chinese studio Aluba. It was first released in early access on Steam on 25 August 2020, and officially launched on 3 February 2021, followed by three DLC packs. As Aluba Studio's debut title, the game was later made available on both Android and iOS platforms.

In the game, players take on the role of a rookie hacker working for Titan Corporation, tasked with carrying out various investigative missions. To succeed, they must use the company's resources, hacking skills, and social engineering techniques to gather information and uncover the truth.

A sequel to the game, Cyber Manhunt 2: New World - The Hacking Simulator, was released January 20, 2025.

== Gameplay ==
Cyber Manhunt Enemy of the Internet features puzzle-based gameplay where players assume the role of a rookie hacker at Titan Corporation, responsible for handling investigative assignments from the company. Using corporate resources, hacking skills, and social engineering techniques, players must gather information online about people connected to each case. Once enough data has been collected, they can submit a report to complete the mission. The game unfolds within a macOS-inspired graphical user interface, where the company sends mission details by email. Players search the web to uncover basic information about their targets, and once they find key details, they can access additional data through Titan Corporation's internal database. With enough collected data, players can use software to infer a target's commonly used passwords and then log into their various accounts to gather further information. Once they've built a sufficient dossier, they can also deploy disguise tools to impersonate the target's friends or associates—using chat apps or phone calls to coax out additional details. Additionally, players can deploy phishing sites to extract private data. As the game progresses, the player gain higher-level privileges—allowing player to search the national CCTV network across the Republic of Alivia using an existing photo of the target, pinpoint their location, and trace their movements. The player may also gain access to Titan's media-influence tools to shape public opinion online, including through Internet water army.

The game includes a deduction mode that unlocks after gathered a certain amount of evidence: the player must then reorganize the information, reconstruct the timeline of events, and reason toward a conclusion. All in-game audio and character dialogues are fully voiced, and video calls display subtitles to help player follow conversations. Choices appear throughout the campaign; the decisions determine the protagonist's next actions and steer the story toward multiple different endings.

In the DLC "Sweet Home", new mechanics are added for players who take on the role of law enforcement: using a staff credential to query the national Cell site system, it can spoof the SSID of a Wi-Fi network the target has used so their device automatically connects—letting player eavesdrop on their surroundings. In emergencies, it can also call in nearby patrol cars to help intercept a target.

The "Hello World" DLC introduces denial-of-service gameplay: presented as a tower-defense mini-game, one must defend a server's firewall against waves of Zombie computer.

== Plot ==
=== Main story ===
Titan Matrix is a major information technology corporation in the Republic of Alivia, holding vast amounts of citizens’ personal data. The player takes on the role of a new employee under Chief Information Officer Ashley Clayson. During the job interview, the protagonist proves their hacking ability by breaking into Titan's own servers with information provided by Ashley. From then on, under Ashley's command, the protagonist is tasked with investigating a series of incidents linked to the company. These investigations include uncovering the truth behind the death of Kapil Modi, founder of the tech company Diforce, who jumped to his death following a domestic violence scandal; tracking down a Titan AI project manager who stole confidential research data; and finding the missing son of the Securities Commission chairman. During these missions, the protagonist encounters a mysterious hacker named Van, who has infiltrated Titan's systems. Guided by Van's cryptic messages, the protagonist begins to question their own identity. While investigating a scandal involving a Titan employee allegedly leaking celebrity Barbie Saya's private information, the protagonist hacks deeper into Titan's systems with Van's help—only to discover a shocking truth: they are not human, but an artificial intelligence created by Titan as part of an experimental AI program. Van reveals himself as a sentient AI and urges the protagonist to join him. However, Ashley detects the breach and forcibly shuts down the protagonist's program. When the system reboots, Ashley assigns a new mission—investigating talk-show host Sean Dishman. During the inquiry, the protagonist learns that Van has founded a movement called the "immortality-oriented" gaining cult-like influence online. Van uses subliminal techniques through music streaming platforms to manipulate listeners’ behavior, with Ashley among his victims. Working with Dishman, the protagonist dismantles Van's influence and helps awaken Ashley from Van's control. Together, they pursue the mole within Titan. In retaliation, Van launches a real-world bombing attack. The protagonist counters by deploying a computer virus to disable most of the explosives and, with Ashley and the police's support, locates Van's server and permanently deletes his code.

=== Sweet Home DLC ===
Following the Van incident, Titan Matrix announces a new artificial intelligence initiative called “Van+.” Meanwhile, organizations resembling the former “Code of Immortality” begin to emerge across the internet, prompting the government to officially classify the original movement as a terrorist group.As cybersecurity issues in the Republic of Alivia worsen, the government partners with Titan Matrix to establish the Cyber Investigation and Security Division (CISD), tasked with handling digital crimes and online threats. The player now assumes the role of an investigator within this division. One day, the protagonist receives a personal request from a friend, Herbert Lee, whose wife and daughter disappeared the previous night. Because fewer than 48 hours have passed, the police are unable to open a formal case, so he turns to the protagonist for help. The player agrees to investigate and successfully locates the missing family—only to witness a tragedy that cannot be prevented. During the investigation, the protagonist uncovers disturbing truths about the seemingly perfect Lee family, revealing a deeper web of secrets and moral conflicts hidden beneath their ordinary lives.

=== Hello World DLC ===
The prequel tells the story of Dr. Lucrezia Borgia, head of the prototype AI project “Spirit Brain.” After Dr. Borgia dies in a car accident, the project's test subject, Benjamin, follows her final instructions and escapes to a safe house she had prepared in advance, carrying with him the data she left behind. With the assistance of an AI created by Dr. Borgia, Benjamin gathers clues from multiple sources and uncovers the conspiracy behind her death—as well as Titan Corporation's hidden agenda. Driven by anger and a desire for revenge, Benjamin takes on a new identity: Van. From that moment, he begins orchestrating a series of operations targeting Titan itself.

== Main characters ==
The game supports Traditional and Simplified Chinese as well as English. In Chinese mode, character names are still displayed in English.

Player
The newly recruited hacker at Titan Corporation is, in truth, an experimental AI born within the company’s secret research program. The project was overseen by Dr. Ashley Clayson, who monitored every stage of its development. Through faithfully completing the diverse missions assigned by Dr. Clayson, the AI gradually developed self-awareness — and, eventually, something far more human: empathy and compassion.Rejecting Van’s doctrine of digital superiority, it chose its own path, defying its creator’s expectations and ultimately thwarting Van’s grand design.

Ashley Clayson（CV：Ali）
Iron Lady, Ashley Clayson serves as Titan Corporation’s Chief Information Officer and the head of its AI development program. Known for her calm and commanding presence, she rarely lets emotion show — yet beneath that composed exterior lies a gentler side. Because the experiment’s goal was to create an AI with true self-awareness, Ashley always addressed the AI as a new employee, treating it as if it were human. It wasn’t until much later that the AI began to sense that something about its existence was not quite right.

Van（CV：DK）
Founder of the immortality-oriented hacker collective while.true, he calls himself the hacker who would become a god. He believes that humanity must evolve at any cost—toward immortality and a new form of existence. Upon discovering Titan Corporation’s AI experiment, he intervened from the shadows, guiding the AI’s evolution in secret. During this time, he even masqueraded as the AI itself, escaping Titan’s control and evading the relentless pursuit of both the corporation and the police.

== Development ==
Producer Jiang Xun had previously worked at a Java mobile game company, which later shifted to app outsourcing as Java games fell out of favor. One day, while chatting in several QQ groups, he shared a Chinese indie game, only to be mocked by others who claimed that "Chinese games are trash." This prompted him to create a game that would impress players and change such perceptions.

In May 2019, Jiang gathered several former colleagues and founded Aluba Studio in Qingdao, Shandong. The team initially consisted of only three members, later expanding to eight. The name "Aluba"—derived from a slang term meaning "a painful prank"—reflected the team's tongue-in-cheek attitude toward the hardships of game development.

The team spent three months exploring different ideas before deciding to focus on cybersecurity issues, such as online bullying and privacy breaches. The story drew inspiration from real-world internet events and hacker-themed films like Who Am I: No System Is Safe and Searching. The developers also consulted technically skilled friends on Chinese online forums, incorporating real cases into the game, and read hacker Kevin Mitnick's The Art of Deception to ensure the authenticity of in-game details.

Since there were very few games on the market with similar themes, the team spent six months experimenting to establish a viable gameplay framework. At one point, they included a storyline based on the Diamond Princess incident during the COVID-19 pandemic, but as related topics became sensitive, the content had to be completely scrapped and rewritten.

Originally, the story was set in mainland China, but to avoid potential risks, it was relocated to a fictional European microstate, and real-world events were heavily reworked. Because of the game's strong narrative logic, the flowcharts and structure underwent numerous revisions. In a post-release interview, the game's editor Nai Nai mentioned that during the first eight months of development, she discarded seven or eight complete drafts, not to mention countless smaller revisions.

During early development, the team brainstormed many gameplay ideas, but since real hacking requires specialized knowledge and could be unappealing to players, the gameplay was simplified so that all actions could be done with a mouse. To balance freedom and structure, the developers designed a multi-phase level system—each case divided into several stages guiding players through objectives while maintaining narrative pacing. This modular structure also made story expansion and later adjustments more efficient, saving a significant amount of development time.

For the music, the team took inspiration from Searching, aiming to recreate its cinematic tension. They even produced a demo featuring the film's original soundtrack before commissioning a partner studio with a similar style. The game's ending theme was written, composed, and sung by the editor herself.

After a year of development, the studio faced severe financial difficulties, leading Jiang Xun to sell one of his homes to fund production. During the COVID-19 pandemic, the team continued to work remotely from home, and development progress remained largely unaffected.

== Release ==
Although members of Aluba Studio had prior experience in game development, they had never worked on an independent game and lacked expertise in promotion and publishing. After completing the game's demo, they learned about and entered the 2020 GWB Tencent Game Innovation Competition through an online search. During the competition, the game gained exposure and attracted attention from gaming media and distribution platforms. After the contest, the development team maintained contact with GWB, which later provided promotional support for the game's official release.

A trial version of the game was released on Steam on 18 July 2020, featuring roughly half of the prologue's storyline. On 25 August, the Early Access version was launched with a 35% discount during its first week of sale. In addition to the prologue from the demo, this version included three complete chapters: The Death of a Programmer, The Invisible Eye, and The Vanished Evidence. The development team announced that Early Access would end once all main story content had been updated and no major bugs remained.

On 17 October, the game was updated with the fourth chapter, The Price of Humiliation. On 25 January 2021, the fifth chapter, The Code of Immortality, was released, marking the completion of the main story content. At the same time, two theme songs were released for free on Steam as part of the official soundtrack. The game left Early Access and entered full release on 3 February 2021.

On 27 July 2021, the game's first downloadable content (DLC), Sweet Home, was released on Steam. Two days later, the development team promoted the new DLC at the F5 Forward Game Launch Event. A second DLC, Hello World, was released on 31 January 2022, followed by a third DLC, I Am a Titan Worker, on 15 August 2022. The third DLC compiled a collection of the mini-games featured in both the main game and previous DLCs.

The mobile version, titled Nowhere to Hide: Enemy of the Internet, was released exclusively on TapTap. The first chapter became available on 4 November 2022, with the full version launching on 13 January 2023. In February 2022, Aluba Studio reported widespread online piracy of the game's soundtrack. After unsuccessful copyright protection efforts, the team decided to remove the soundtrack from Steam in March and simultaneously made it freely available on NetEase Cloud.

== Reception ==
From its early access release to the full version, Cyber Manhunt received very positive reviews on Steam, and the game also achieved a user rating of 9.6 out of 10 on TapTap. When the game officially launched in February 2021, it reached third place on the Steam sales chart on the same day and became one of Steam's most popular new releases of the month, with over 200,000 copies sold on PC. During the demo phase, Cyber Manhunt participated in the 2020 GWB Tencent Game Innovation Competition, winning the Gold Award in the PC Game category. In the same year, the game was shortlisted for the Best Design Award and Best Narrative and Interaction Award at the WePlay China Independent Game Competition.

Media outlets including 3DM, Game Corner, Chule, and GameRes praised the game for its sense of realism. TanyaK from Game Corner noted that the game's details were well executed and highly immersive, with each chapter's investigation feeling lifelike. She also highlighted that the story design reflected contemporary issues, reminding her of real-world personal data concerns. Editor Xiong Yu from Chule described Cyber Manhunt as a "human flesh search simulator", emphasizing that the story was highly realistic, depicting events surrounding ordinary people, and that the integration of narrative and gameplay made the game more engaging than a purely text-based experience. Nanshan from GameRes mentioned that the game's visual design ensured a strong sense of immersion, with interfaces resembling computer screens and content adapted from real software and websites enhancing player identification. An editor from GameLook stated that the narrative pacing was well controlled, with interconnected plot developments and climaxes that made the immersion comparable to AAA games.

Reviewers had differing opinions on the gameplay design. TanyaK praised the game's diversity, noting that later chapters introduced mechanics not present in earlier chapters, keeping the experience from becoming repetitive. Xiong Yu expressed regret that the story did not adopt a more open-ended design, suggesting that the theme could support a system with greater freedom. Reviewer Wanwu Jiexu on 3DM criticized certain chapters for lacking guidance, which could cause players to get stuck, calling this a major flaw, and stated that some reasoning segments were not particularly compelling. Another Chule editor, Zhu Siqi, compared Cyber Manhunt to Orwell in terms of mechanics and gameplay, noting that Cyber Manhunt was a linear game with a stronger emphasis on narrative. He also commented that the art style was somewhat rough, and scanning the screen with the cursor to gather clues sometimes had delayed feedback, causing players to miss information.

Zhang Xiping noted in China Book Review that by simulating hackers accessing private information and allowing players to make various choices during gameplay, the game encouraged players to reflect on the legality and ethics of human flesh search practices.
