= Logan's Sanctuary =

Studio album by Roger Joseph Manning Jr. and Brian Reitzell
- Released: 13 June 2000
- Recorded: Bomb Factory
- Genre: Electronica, Soundtrack
- Label: Emperor Norton Records
- Producer: Roger Joseph Manning Jr. and Brian Reitzell

Logan's Sanctuary is an electronica album by Roger Joseph Manning Jr. and Brian Reitzell, conceived as the soundtrack for an imagined sequel to the film Logan's Run.

Manning's former bandmate in Jellyfish, Jason Falkner, contributed to two tracks. Also, photographs of Falkner dressed in costumes reminiscent of the film were incorporated into the CD booklet. Manning, Reitzell, and Falkner later formed the band TV Eyes, recording their first album between 2000 and 2003, although it was not released until 2006.

== Track listing ==
1. "Islands In The Sky" - 2:39
2. "Search For Tomorrow" - 5:13
3. "The Game" - 4:24
4. "Lara's Rainbow" - 5:08
5. "Metropia" - 5:56
6. "Pleasure Dome 12" - 4:46
7. "Ian's Orbit" - 6:00
8. "Escape" - 3:27
9. "Endless Tunnels" - 6:10
10. "The Silver Garden" - 5:40

== Personnel ==
- Roger Joseph Manning Jr. - Producer, Composer, Performer
- Brian Reitzell - Producer, Composer, Performer
- Jason Falkner - guitar on "Metropia"; lead vocal, guitar and bass on "Search For Tomorrow"
- Justin Meldal-Johnsen - bass on "Lara's Rainbow", "Metropia", "Ian's Orbit", and "Endless Tunnels"
