= I'm OK, You're OK (album) =

Studio album by Jason Falkner
- Released: April 30, 2007
- Genre: Power pop; indie pop; chamber pop
- Length: 54:48
- Label: Noise McCartney; Cobraside (U.S.)
- Producer: Jason Falkner

Jason Falkner chronology
Bliss Descending (EP) (2004)	I'm OK, You're OK (2007)	All Quiet on the Noise Floor (2009)

Professional ratings
Review scores
Source	Rating
AllMusic	3.5/5 stars

I'm OK, You're OK is the third studio album by Jason Falkner, released in Japan on April 30, 2007, on Noise McCartney Records.

A U.S. version was released on February 16, 2010. This edition featured two differences from the Japanese release, an entirely new version of "This Time" and a different mix on "The Knew." It was also increased in volume 4.5 dB although the mastering EQ stayed the same. It is available in both CD and double vinyl formats.

== Track listing ==
All tracks are written by Jason Falkner.

No.	Title	Length
1.	"This Time"	4:40
2.	"NYC"	3:52
3.	"The Knew"	3:22
4.	"Stephanie Tells Me"	4:50
5.	"Hurricane"	4:52
6.	"Anondah"	5:06
7.	"Komplicated Man"	3:13
8.	"Runaway"	6:24
9.	"Say It's True"	5:05
10.	"Contact"	4:04
11.	"This Life of Mine"	4:13
12.	"I Don't Mind" (Japan Bonus Track)	5:12

== Personnel ==
- Jason Falkner - vocals, instruments, production
- Jeremy Stacy - drums on "Runaway"
- Christy Hindenlang - background vocals on "NYC"

== Production ==
- Jason Falkner - production, mixing, art direction, photography
- Mathieu Bitton - art direction, design
- Jason Cupp - studio assistance
- Alan Yoshida - mastering

Written, produced and mixed at Rhetoric Studios, 2001-2007
Mastered at Ocean Way Mastering
