= Bliss Descending =

EP by Jason Falkner
- Released: October 19, 2004
- Genres: Power pop; indie pop; alternative rock; pop
- Length: 22:23
- Label: Wreckhords
- Producer: Jason Falkner

Jason Falkner chronology
Bedtime With The Beatles: Instrumental Versions of Classic Beatles Songs (2004)	Bliss Descending (2004)	I'm OK, You're OK (2007)

Bliss Descending is the first released extended play by Jason Falkner, released on October 19, 2004 by Wreckhords Records.

== Critical reception ==
Professional ratings
Review scores
Source	Rating
AllMusic	4/5 stars
PopMatters	(positive)
Chicago Tribune	(positive)

The EP received highly positive reviews from music critics. Tim Sendra of AllMusic wrote that each song “...would have sounded great on an album, no filler to be found”. He praised the EP’s production and songcraft as well as Falkner’s vocals, calling the songs “Moving Up” and “The Neighbor” the best songs from the release. In a track-by-track review for PopMatters, Gary Glauber criticized the “weak rhyming” of “The Neighbor”, but praised tracks such as “Moving Up” and “Lost Myself”. In summation, Glauber writes, “Listening to Falkner's music is a joyous event -- his ebullience inspires smiles all around. There's a simple innocence and charm to the songs; he sings as though you're a confidante, and you get sucked into the whorl of pretty layered sounds and perfect fills. If these songs are a preview of the longer work upcoming, put me down for one now.”

== Track listing ==
All songs written and composed by Jason Falkner.

No.	Title	Length
1.	"The Neighbor"	4:31
2.	"They Put Her in the Movies"	3:44
3.	"Feeling No Pain"	4:58
4.	"Moving Up"	5:08
5.	"Lost Myself"	4:02
Total length:		22:23

== Personnel ==
- Jason Falkner — vocals, instrumentation, production, mixing
- Justin Stacey — drums on “The Neighbor” and “Moving Up”
- Justin Stanley — mixing on “The Neighbor” and “Moving Up”
