= TV Eyes (album) =

Studio album by TV Eyes
- Released: October 25, 2006
- Recorded: 2000–2003
- Genre: New wave; electropop; post-punk
- Length: 44:31
- Label: Noise McCartney
- Producer: Jason Falkner; Roger Joseph Manning, Jr.; Brian Reitzell

TV Eyes is the first and only studio album by TV Eyes, released on October 25, 2006, by Noise McCartney Records in Japan.

The album was supported with a single for the song, “She’s a Study”. Despite positive reviews from critics, TV Eyes was the only studio album released from the group. It was followed up by an EP in 2008, titled Softcore, containing original songs and remixes of songs from the album.

On October 7, 2014, the album was released internationally (along with the single "She Gets Around" and remixes from the EP Softcore) on both CD and vinyl by Omnivore Recordings.

== Track listing ==
=== CD: BNCP-134 ===
All songs written by Jason Falkner, Roger Joseph Manning, Jr. & Brian Reitzell.

1. "Over the City" – 4:58
2. "Fascinating" – 5:18
3. "She's a Study" – 4:50
4. "The Party's Over" – 4:40
5. "Mission: Submission" – 4:29
6. "Love to Need" – 4:04
7. "What She Said" – 4:12
8. "Crash Yer Car" – 2:46
9. "Fade Away" – 4:28
10. "Time's Up" – 4:46

=== 2014 CD and vinyl release: OV-97 ===
All songs written by Jason Falkner, Roger Joseph Manning, Jr. & Brian Reitzell.

1. "Over the City"
2. "Fascinating"
3. "She's a Study"
4. "The Party's Over"
5. "Mission: Submission"
6. "Love to Need"
7. "What She Said"
8. "Fade Away"
9. "Time's Up"
10. "Fascinating" (Jason Falkner Remix)
11. "She's A Study" (Roger Joseph Manning Jr. “Malibu” Remix)
12. "Time's Up" (Brian Reitzell Remix)
13. "She Gets Around"

== Personnel ==
=== Musicians ===
- Performed by Jason Falkner, Roger Joseph Manning, Jr. & Brian Reitzell

=== Production ===
- Produced and recorded by Jason Falkner, Roger Joseph Manning, Jr. & Brian Reitzell
- Additional engineering by JJ Blair
- Mixed by Justin Stanley except "Crash Yer Car" mixed by Jason Falkner
- Mastered by Dan Hersch at Digiprep
- Art Direction, design & cover illustration by Mathieu Bitton - www.candytangerine.com
- Photography - Brian Reitzell (booklet) & JJ Blair (inner tray)
