= Can You Still Feel? =

Studio album by Jason Falkner
- Released: February 23, 1999
- Genre: Power pop; indie rock
- Length: 46:18
- Label: Elektra Entertainment
- Producer: Jason Falkner; Nigel Godrich

Jason Falkner chronology
Presents Author Unknown (1996)	Can You Still Feel? (1999)	Necessity: The 4-Track Years (2001)

Professional ratings
Review scores
Source	Rating
AllMusic	4/5 stars
The Encyclopedia of Popular Music	4/5 stars
Los Angeles Times	3/4 stars
Melody Maker	2/5 stars
MusicHound Rock	4.5/5 stars
Pitchfork	5.8/10
PopMatters	8.3/10
Rolling Stone	3/5 stars
USA Today	3/4 stars
Vue Weekly	3/5 stars

Can You Still Feel? is the second studio album by Jason Falkner, released on February 23, 1999, by Elektra Entertainment. It was produced by Falkner and Nigel Godrich.

The album was supported with singles for the songs “Holiday”, “Eloquence”, and “My Lucky Day”. Falkner's recording contract with Elektra came to an end after the album was met with weak sales numbers. It would be his last solo album for nearly a decade.

== Background ==
Due to the lack of commercial success of his debut album, Presents Author Unknown, Falkner requested to be dropped by his label Elektra Records. Falkner felt the album could have had a “much, much larger audience” and felt that the label's lack of promotion was to blame for its disappointing sales. However, according to Falkner, the label took responsibility for the album's lack of success and requested that he record another album in the same manner he had recorded his debut.

The album was co-produced by Nigel Godrich, famous for his work with the band Radiohead. Falkner recalls listening to the album OK Computer and immediately beginning to look through the album's booklet to find who had produced it. He has stated that he worked well with Godrich in producing a sound that was “exactly right”.

The album's original working titles were 17A and Amazing the Survivors. Falkner decided against the latter title as he felt it was “hard to say” and could have been “taken a little egotistically”. Falkner says the background for the album's eventual title was: “When you have to work for something you appreciate it ten times more. So Can You Still Feel? refers to that... essentially it's 'stop and smell the roses.'”

== Composition ==
In an article for HuffPost, Tony Sachs described the album's sound (as well as the sound of his debut) as being a mix of “classic ‘60s songcraft, elements of ‘70s glam-rock, and the new-wave sheen of the ‘80s” while “sounding completely contemporary.”

The album's lead single "Eloquence" has been described as "a stately, power chord-laden, midtempo tune that recalls Sgt. Pepper-era Beatles, along with more than a hint of “All The Young Dudes,” the ‘70s rock classic written by David Bowie and made famous by Mott The Hoople."

== Track listing ==
All tracks written and composed by Jason Falkner.

1. "The Invitation" – 0:25
2. "Author Unknown" – 3:32
3. "Revelation" – 5:44
4. "My Lucky Day" – 3:25
5. "Holiday" – 3:59
6. "Eloquence" – 3:41
7. "I Already Know" – 4:26
8. "See You Again" – 5:06
9. "Honey" – 4:14
10. "The Plan" – 4:45
11. "All God's Creatures" – 2:53
12. "Goodnight Sweet Night" – 4:10

== Personnel ==
- Jason Falkner — vocals, keyboards, guitar, bass, drums, percussion, production, mixing
- Jim Akimoto — flute, saxophone
- Suzie Katayama — string arrangements

Technical

- Nigel Godrich - production, engineering (tracks: 1 to 3, 6 to 12)
- Dan Steinberg, John Sorenson, and Phillip Broussard — engineering (assistant)
- Ethan Allen — engineering (second engineer)
- Alan Yoshida — mastering
- George Giz and Wil Sharpe — management
- Jennifer Roddie — art direction
- Stephen Stickler — photography
