= Catnip Dynamite =

2008 studio album by Roger Joseph Manning Junior

Studio album by Roger Joseph Manning Jr.
- Released: 19 May 2008 (Japan); 3 February 2009 (worldwide)
- Recorded: 2006–2007
- Genres: Power pop; glam rock
- Length: 62:00
- Labels: Pony Canyon (Japan); Oglio (worldwide)
- Producer: Roger Joseph Manning Jr.

Roger Joseph Manning Jr. chronology
The Land of Pure Imagination (2006)	Catnip Dynamite (2008)	Glamping (2018)

Professional ratings
Review scores
Source	Rating
AllMusic	3.5/5 stars
Metro Spirit	(not rated)

Catnip Dynamite is the second solo album by Jellyfish co-founder Roger Joseph Manning Jr., released in Japan on March 19, 2008. Catnip Dynamite was released outside Japan by Oglio Records on February 3, 2009.

The music on this album contains some of Manning's song ideas that go back as far as 1985. Manning has described the album as "another roller coaster ride of sonic and emotional ups and downs and distraction in the greatest sense of the word."

== Track listing ==
=== CD: PCCY-01871 ===
All songs written by Roger Joseph Manning Jr., except where noted.

1. "The Quickening" – 5:06
2. "Love's Never Half As Good" – 5:36
3. "Down in Front" – 5:23
4. "My Girl" – 4:09
5. "Imaginary Friend" – 5:07
6. "Haunted Henry" – 4:49
7. "Tinsel Town" – 5:23
8. "Turnstile at Heaven's Gate" – 4:40
9. "Survival Machine" – 7:54
10. "Living in End Times" – 5:09
11. "Drive Thru Girl" – 5:15
12. "American Affluenza" – 3:29

=== CD: Oglio Release ===
1. "The Quickening" – 5:06
2. "Love's Never Half As Good" – 5:36
3. "Down in Front" – 5:23
4. "My Girl" – 4:09
5. "Imaginary Friend" – 5:07
6. "Haunted Henry" – 4:49
7. "Tinsel Town" – 5:23
8. "Turnstile at Heaven's Gate" – 4:40
9. "Survival Machine" – 7:54
10. "Living in End Times" – 5:09
11. "Drive Thru Girl" – 5:15
12. "Europa and the Pirate Twins" (Thomas Dolby) – 3:37 ^{*}
13. "You Were Right" – 6:08 ^{*}
14. "Love Lies Bleeding" (Elton John/Bernie Taupin) – 11:34 ^{*}

^{*} Live from Fuji Rock, Japan

== Personnel ==
Musicians

- Roger Joseph Manning Jr. – music and lyrics
- Pedal steel guitar on "Tinsel Town" by Dave Pearlman

Production

- Produced by Roger Joseph Manning Jr.
- Mixed and mastered by John Paterno
