= Indian burn =

Pain-inducing prank

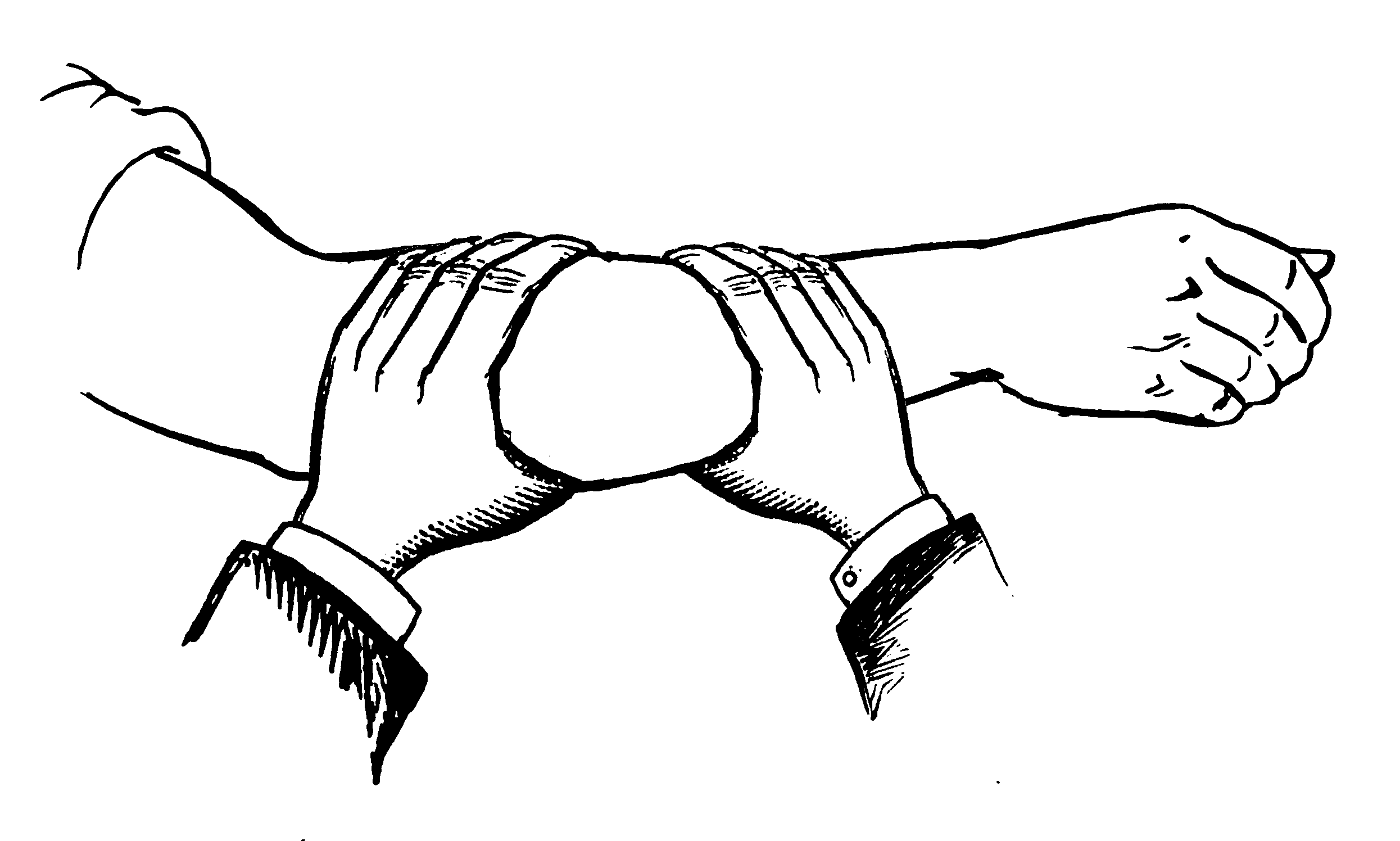
An Indian burn

An Indian burn or Chinese burn is a pain-inducing prank in which the prankster grabs onto the victim's forearm or wrist with two hands and twists the skin in opposite directions. This motion causes several sensations at once on the epidermis, including shear stress, abrasion, and heat from friction. The nerve endings of the forearm are pulled and stretched, which causes the immediate pain one feels while receiving the prank. It is popular in British school settings.

== Terminology ==
The prank is known by way of several names in English, depending on the region: in the United States, it may be referred to as Indian sunburn or Indian rug burn, as well as Chinese wrist-burn, and as the snake bite; in countries such as the United Kingdom and Australia, it is known as a Chinese burn.

In Mexico it is known as an enchilada, which is related to chili and means "affected by hot chili", in Swedish it is called tusen nålar "a thousand needles" and in Afrikaans it is called donkie byt "donkey bite".

Some Native Americans resent the usage of "Indian burn", preferring the other aforementioned English terms.

== Variation ==
In a variation of the prank, a yarn is rubbed against the skin to create friction, in a manner similar to starting a fire with a stick.

== Statistics ==
According to a poll of 1,844 adults carried out in the United Kingdom in 2013, 27% recalled receiving Indian burns during secondary school years.

== See also ==
- List of practical joke topics
  - Wedgie
- Shear force
