= Make It Be =

- 2017 cover. Illustration by Stephen Kalinich

Studio album by R. Stevie Moore & Jason Falkner
- Released: January 18, 2015
- Recorded: November 2012
- Studios: Jason Falkner's studio, Hollywood, Los Angeles, California
- Genres: Lo-fi; power pop; alternative rock; garage rock; psychedelic rock
- Length: 52:52

R. Stevie Moore chronology
Herald, Goods (2014)	Make It Be (2015)	Nobody Pays Me Much Mind Until I'm Gone (2016)

Jason Falkner chronology
All Quiet on the Noise Floor (2009)	Make It Be (2015)

Make It Be is the first collaborative studio album by American musicians R. Stevie Moore and Jason Falkner, self-released on January 10, 2015. The album was recorded in November 2012. On March 10, 2017, it was reissued through Bar/None Records and was met with generally favorable reviews.

The album consists of newly written material along with rerecordings of a few of Moore's songs. Its reissue added one more track, "Horror Show", written by Falkner.

== Critical reception ==
Professional ratings
Aggregate scores
Source	Rating
Metacritic	79/100
Review scores
Source	Rating
AllMusic	4/5 stars
The Guardian	4/5 stars
PopMatters	8/10 stars
The Wire	4/5 stars

At Metacritic, which assigns a normalized rating out of 100 to reviews from critics, Make It Be received an average score of 79 based on 10 reviews, indicating "generally favorable reviews". The Guardian's Gwilym Mumford wrote, "A certain tolerance for Moore’s loopier sound experiments and slam poetry skits may be required here, but for the most part this is an appealing mix of strangeness and sheen." Tim Sendra of AllMusic reviewed that the "record is packed with really fun, great-sounding songs and moments where the guys sound like they're having a blast working together. PopMatters' Jeff Beaudoin deemed the album "a fine, fine record that deserves to be heard now and well into the distant future."

== Track listing ==
No.	Title	Writer(s)	Length
1.	"I H8 Ppl"	R. Stevie Moore	3:51
2.	"Another Day Slips Away"	Moore; Roger Ferguson	4:30
3.	"I Love Us, We Love Me"	Moore	3:52
4.	"Gower (Theme From A Scene)"	Moore; Jason Falkner	1:39
5.	"Prohibited Permissions"	Moore	0:31
6.	"Stamps"	Moore	2:30
7.	"Guitar Interplé"	Moore; Falkner	1:30
8.	"Sincero Amore"	Moore; Falkner	3:20
9.	"Don't You Just Know It"	Huey Piano Smith; Johnny Vincent	3:42
10.	"If You See Kay / Run For Your Lives!"	Moore; Falkner	3:50
11.	"Guitar Interplay Dos"	Moore; Falkner	2:45
12.	"That's Fine, What Time?"	Moore; Falkner	4:03
13.	"Play Myself Some Music"	Moore	3:41
14.	"Passed Away Today"	Moore; Falkner	5:41
15.	"Album Drop"	Moore	1:15
16.	"I Am The Best For You"	Moore	4:49
17.	"Falkner Walk"	Moore	0:57
Total length:			52:52
