= Bartell (album) =

Compilation album by The Moog Cookbook
- Released: 2005
- Genre: Electronica
- Length: 73:49
- Label: Cookbook Kitschen Records
- Producer: The Moog Cookbook

The Moog Cookbook chronology
Ye Olde Space Bande (1997)	Bartell (2005)	Xmas Recipes (Y Mas) (2014)

Bartell is a compilation album by American electronic band The Moog Cookbook, released in 2005. It consists of material previously released as single b-sides and on EPs, soundtracks and compilation albums, as well as previously unreleased material.

The album marks the first commercial release of the band's cover of Foo Fighters' "Big Me," which had been featured in the music video for "Monkey Wrench."

== Track listing ==
=== CD: MC-1205-01 ===
No.	Title	Writer(s)	Track Details	Length
1.	"Twist Barbie"	Naoko Yamano	Remix of Shonen Knife	4:19
2.	"Kelly Watch the Stars"	Nicolas Godin, Jean-Benoît Dunckel	Remix of Air	5:38
3.	"Novocaine for the Soul"	Mark Oliver Everett	Cover of Eels	3:08
4.	"Lost in Space Part #1"	John Williams	Cover of Lost in Space TV theme	3:38
5.	"Lost in Space Part #2"	Roger Manning, Brian Kehew	Original by The Moog Cookbook	2:19
6.	"Big Me"	Dave Grohl	Cover of Foo Fighters	2:43
7.	"Surrender"	Rick Nielsen	Cover of Cheap Trick	3:51
8.	"Pumpernickel's Dark Ride Theme"	Joel Hodgson	From an unaired TV show	4:37
9.	"Psyche Rock"	Pierre Henry	Remix of Pierre Henry	4:57
10.	"Mountain"	Yuhi Komiyama	Remix of You He-Es	5:24
11.	"20th Century Boy"	Marc Bolan	Cover of T. Rex	3:50
12.	"Bob's Boogie"	Manning, Kehew	Original by The Moog Cookbook	5:14
13.	"Mon Coeur"	Camille Saint-Saëns	Remix of Klaus Nomi	4:09
14.	"Time"	Alex Gopher	Remix of Alex Gopher	6:06
15.	"Silent Night"	Joseph Mohr, Franz Xaver Gruber	From the Christmas EP	3:14
16.	"Winter Wonderland"	Felix Bernard, Richard B. Smith	From the Christmas EP	2:39
17.	"Deck the Halls"/"Sleigh Ride"	Unknown / Leroy Anderson	From the Christmas EP	2:51
18.	"Santa Claus Is Coming to Town"	Haven Gillespie, John Frederick Coots	From the Christmas EP	2:55
19.	"Jingle Bells"	James Pierpont	From the Christmas EP	2:18
Total length:				73:49

== Personnel ==
=== Musicians ===
- Meco Eno
- Uli Nomi

=== Production ===
- Arranged, recorded and produced by The Moog Cookbook
- "Twist Barbie" and "Kelly Watch the Stars" arranged by Roger Manning
- "20th Century Boy" and "Mon Coeur" arranged by Brian Kehew
- "Pumpernickel's Dark Ride Theme" arranged by Manning/Kehew
- Mastering by Steve Turnidge at Ultraviolet Studios
