= Jason Falkner =

American songwriter and musician

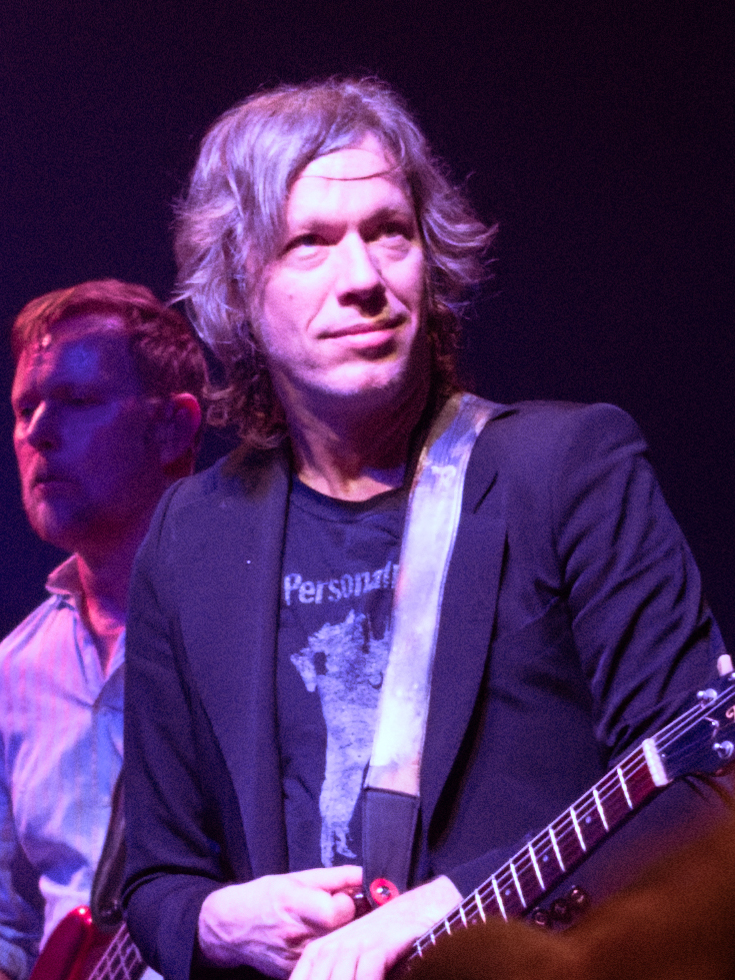
- Falkner in 2026

Background information
- Born: June 2, 1968 (age 57)
- Origin: Agoura Hills, California, U.S.
- Genres: Rock; pop; power pop
- Occupation: Musician
- Instruments: Vocals; guitar; keyboards; bass; drums
- Years active: 1988–present

Jason Falkner (born June 2, 1968) is an American songwriter, musician, and guitarist who was a member of the bands Jellyfish, the Three O'Clock, and the Grays. Since 1996, he has released six solo albums, starting with Presents Author Unknown. He is also a session musician and producer who has contributed to dozens of recordings by other bands and musicians as well as a touring bassist with the French duo Air, and more recently as the touring guitarist with Beck for decades.

== Early bands ==
Falkner joined the Three O'Clock, as a guitarist (and composer of one song) on their final album Vermillion, released in 1988 on Prince's Paisley Park Records label. However, the band broke up shortly afterwards." Afterward, Falkner's friend Roger Manning convinced him to move to San Francisco to join his new band, Jellyfish. The band's 1990 debut album, Bellybutton, was a minor chart success and received some radio and MTV play. Falkner, however, had a number of disputes, mostly with band leader Andy Sturmer, primarily concerning his lack of songwriting opportunities, and what he considered the band's over-reliance on its influences instead of cultivating its own image. He left the band shortly after touring the world in support of Bellybutton, vowing never to join another band.

In 1993, Falkner worked with Fabulon as a guest musician. This led to jobs as a session player for several other bands, and he worked in this capacity when he met Jon Brion. Reluctantly breaking his vow against joining another band, he found himself in the Grays with Jon Brion, Buddy Judge, and Dan McCarroll. Composed of three separate songwriters/lead singers/multi-instrumentalists and a drummer, the band fervently disliked the pitfalls and self-imposed politics of most rock bands, and did all in their power to avoid them. In spite of this, musical differences led to a rift between members. They released only one album, 1994's Ro Sham Bo, before disbanding.

== Solo career ==
In 1996, he released the album Jason Falkner Presents Author Unknown, which was produced, written, and performed almost entirely by Falkner (the only exceptions being a string section heard on several songs, and a guitar overdub on one song by Alain Johannes). Although it received strong critical reviews, it was not a commercial success. During that same year, he co-wrote seven songs on Brendan Benson's album One Mississippi and played various instruments on Susanna Hoffs second solo album, released in 1996. In 1997, he worked with Eric Matthews on a second album, The Lateness of the Hour, co-producing and assisting on five tracks.

In 1999, Falkner released Can You Still Feel?, another album written and performed as a completely solo effort, aside from the horns and strings. This album was produced with Nigel Godrich. In 2000, Falkner kept busy, touring and contributing to various projects. He recorded a song for a tribute album, and performed on Roger Joseph Manning Jr. and Brian Reitzell's album Logan's Sanctuary, conceived as the soundtrack album for an imagined sequel to the film Logan's Run.

In 2001, he worked with Air on their 10 000 Hz Legend album, and toured with the band later on as their bassist. During that time, spinART Records released Necessity: The 4-Track Years, a disc composed of old four-track demos. Falkner's projects that year included an instrumental album of Beatles songs, and he contributed a track ("Do Ya") to a Jeff Lynne tribute album Lynne Me Your Ears. While in France with Air, he worked with Roger Manning and Brian Reitzell again, this time performing under the band name TV Eyes.

Falkner spent the summer of 2002 touring with Air, and contributed on albums for other artists, including Beck, Aimee Mann, and Travis. He also co-wrote and produced several tracks on Brendan Benson's album Lapalco. He began working on his third studio album in June 2003, and worked on albums for Beck and Air. In early 2004 he joined Travis on tour, as their opening act, to debut his Bliss Descending EP. He also contributed guitar parts to two songs on Paul McCartney's 2005 album, Chaos and Creation in the Backyard. He is cited as playing assorted instruments on several tracks of Beck's 2006 album, The Information, and 2008 album, Modern Guilt.

His third solo album, I'm OK, You're OK, was released in Japan, on Noise McCartney Records on April 18, 2007. It was released in the U.S. on February 16, 2010 with alternate versions of two tracks, "This Time" and "The Knew". Falkner's second album of instrumental Beatles covers, Bedtime with the Beatles 2, was released on June 17, 2008.

Falkner's fourth solo album, All Quiet on the Noise Floor, was released in Japan on September 2, 2009. During a March 2013 interview, Falkner indicated that he is working on a new solo album and has already written five new songs. He hoped to release the new album in the fall of 2013, shortly after All Quiet on the Noise Floor is finally released in the U.S., perhaps digitally.

In 2024, Falkner played on St. Vincent's All Born Screaming Tour.

In 2026, Falkner stepped in to play with the Foo Fighters after long time guitarist Pat Smear broke his leg.

== Influences ==
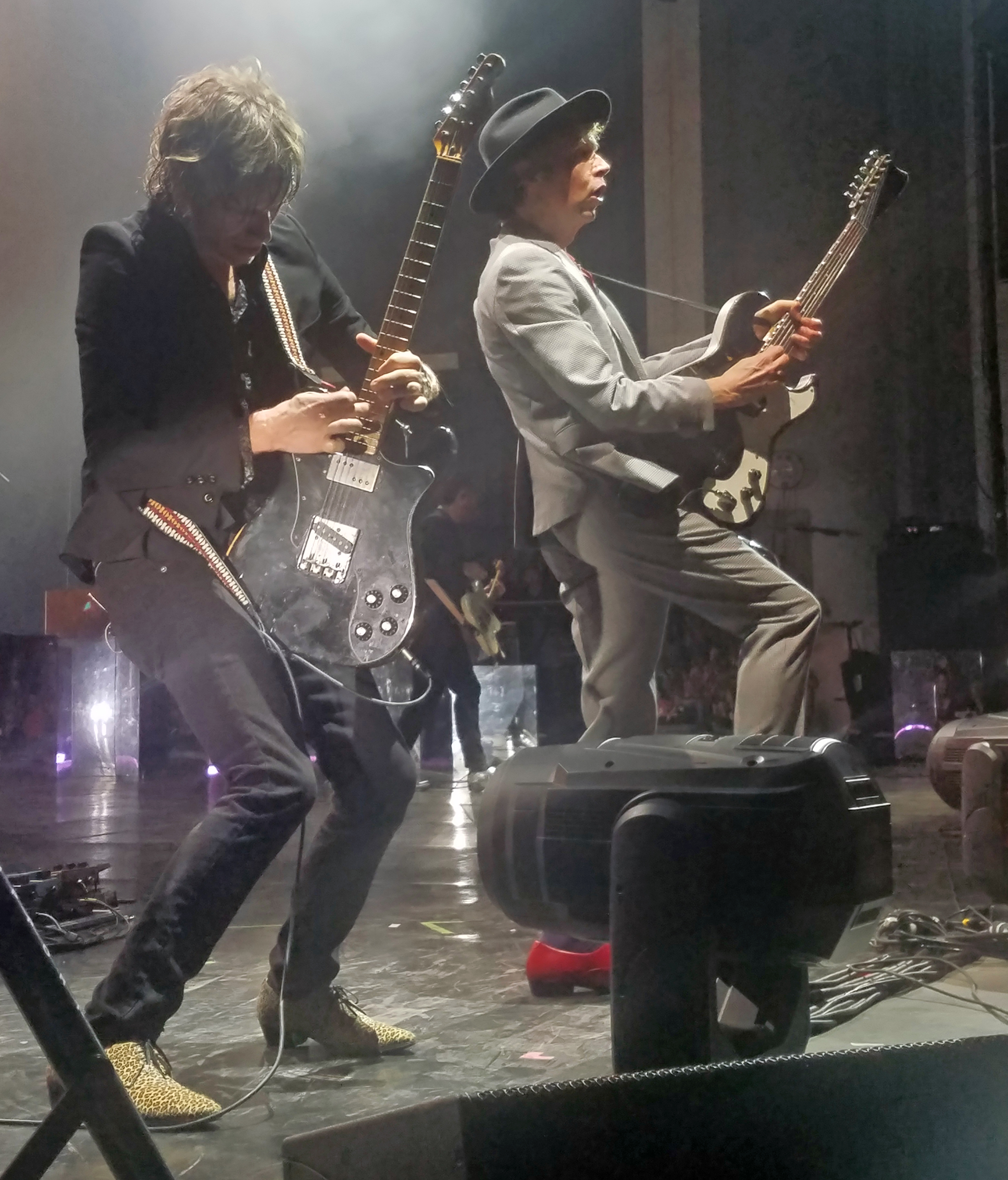
Falkner performs a guitar solo during Beck's concert at the PNC Bank Arts Center in Holmdel, NJ, on August 20, 2019.

Falkner cited XTC, Elvis Costello, and the Beatles as personal influences.

== Discography ==
=== Studio albums ===
- Presents Author Unknown (1996)
- Can You Still Feel? (1999)
- Bedtime with the Beatles: Instrumental Versions of Classic Beatles Songs (2001)
- I'm OK, You're OK (2007)
- Bedtime with the Beatles, Pt. 2 (2008)
- All Quiet on the Noise Floor (2009)
- Make It Be (2015) (R. Stevie Moore & Jason Falkner)

=== Compilations ===
- Everyone Says It's On (2001)
- Necessity: The 4-Track Years (2001)

=== EP ===
- Bliss Descending (2004)

=== Singles ===
- "I Live" (1996)
- "Miracle Medicine" (1996)
- "Follow Me" (1997)
- "All God's Creatures" (split with Robyn Hitchcock) (1997)
- "Holiday" (1998)
- "Eloquence" (1999)
- "My Lucky Day" (1999)

=== Appearances ===
- The Three O'Clock – Vermillion (1988)
- Jellyfish – Bellybutton (1990)
- The Grays – Ro Sham Bo (1994)
- Eric Matthews – It's Heavy in Here (1995)
- Logan's Sanctuary (2000)
- AIR — 10 000 Hz Legend (2001)
- Beck — Sea Change (2002)
- Paul McCartney – Chaos and Creation in the Backyard (2005)
- Beck – The Information (2006)
- TV Eyes – TV Eyes (2006)
- Ocean's 13 – Soundtrack (2007)
- The Informers – Soundtrack (2009)
- Cheap Trick - The Latest (2009)
- Daniel Johnston – Is and Always Was (2009)
- TV GUESTS – Franklin 101 (2010)
- Beck – Morning Phase (2014)
- Noel Gallagher's High Flying Birds – Who Built the Moon? (2017)
- Beck – Hyperspace (2019)
- Gary Wilson & R. Stevie Moore – Let's Take A Ride Into Outer Space (2019)
- Noel Gallagher's High Flying Birds – Council Skies (2023)
