= Sack tapping =

Slang for a specific violent game or prank

Sack tapping is a slang term for a game where a participant attacks, by slapping, tapping, punching, kicking, elbowing, twisting or backhanding, another male’s testicles. The term derived from 'sack', slang that refers to the scrotum, and the activity is a form of groin attack. This can result in severe testicular injury that may require amputation as the only form of treatment. A reported increased popularity of sack tapping, fueled in part by YouTube videos, and the subsequent increase in hospitalization has concerned parents and urologists. It is also called "nut tag", "bag tag", "sack whack", "bell flicking" and "roshambo", the last name coming from an episode of South Park that featured the practice.

== Sociological impact ==
In 2010, a participant lost a testicle caused by physical trauma that resulted from a sack tapping assault at school. ABC News' chief medical correspondent Dr. Tim Johnson commented, "the trend isn't restricted to Minnesota", and has "gotten out of control" as per Dr. Scott Wheeler. Dr. Wheeler, a urologist in Minnesota, has seen an increase of hospitalization caused by "sack tapping" incidents, and commented that criminal charges could be filed against the attacker as a result of the one instance. The casualty survived the surgery and can function normally with one testicle. The casualty's mother saw "what he went through every day" and withdrew his enrollment from school. "Sack tapping" has grown into a more dangerous game that can result in greater injuries. Dr. Wheeler recommend that parents warn their children of the dangers of "sack tapping".

Jack Shafer, writing in Slate magazine in 2010, commented that despite the media describing sack tapping as "the latest dangerous craze", the practice was not new and had existed for some time, and the recent focus was simply "sensationalist journalism". He claimed to have been "taking shots to my crown jewels when I was a 1960s teenager", adding that the term had been listed in the Urban Dictionary since February 2003. He noted that urologists were not polled regarding an increase in such injuries, and were only asked to confirm that such injured were common.

== See also ==
- Happy corner
- Nutcracker syndrome
- School bullying
- Testicular torsion
- Testicular trauma
- Youth subculture
