= Rochambeau Worsted Company Mill =

- U.S. National Register of Historic Places
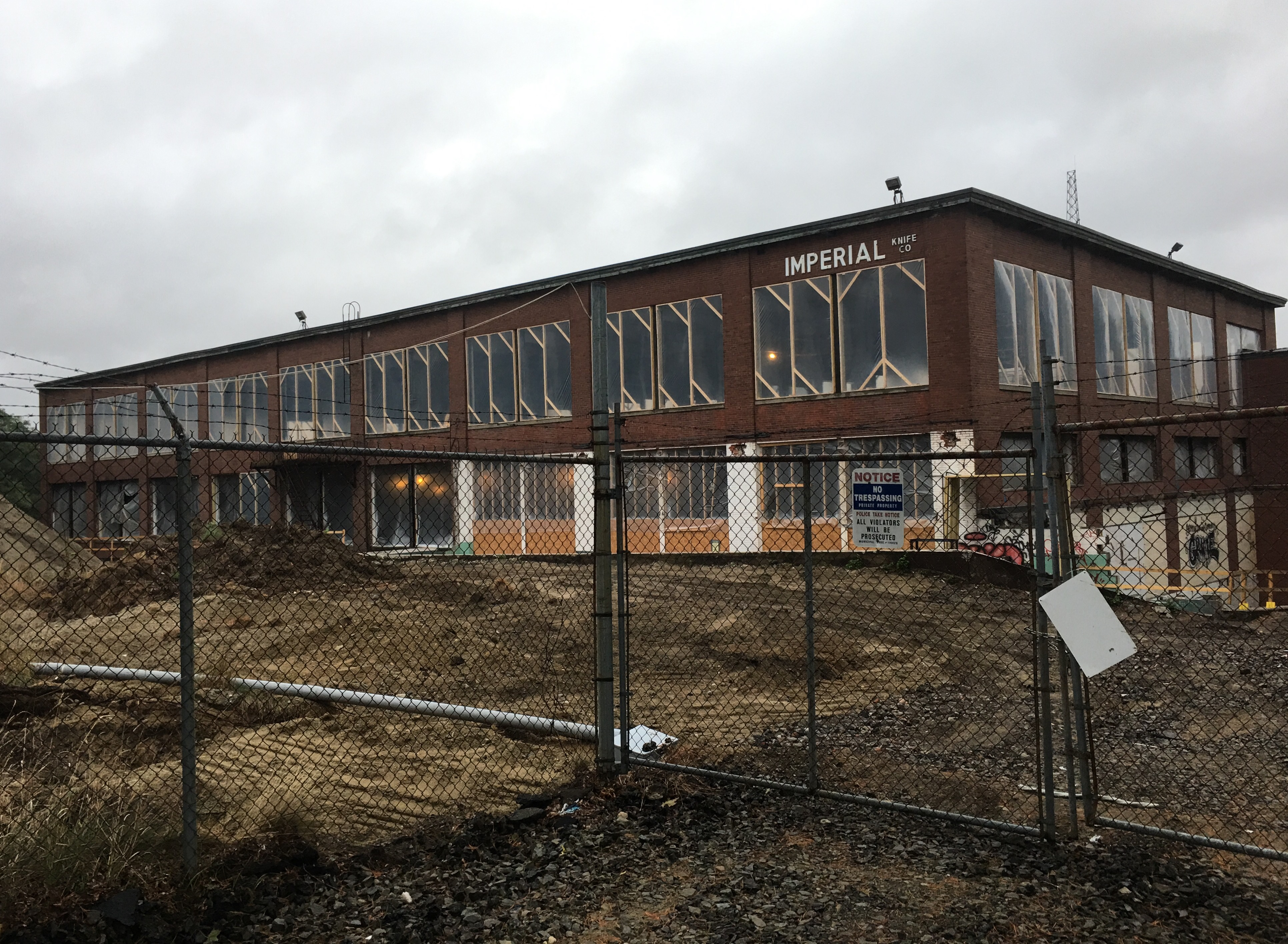

- Location within Rhode Island Location within the United States
- Location: 60 King St., Providence, Rhode Island
- Coordinates: 41°49′23″N 71°27′13″W
- Area: 8.65 acres (3.50 ha)
- Built: 1923
- Architect: Walter Fontaine
- NRHP reference No.: 100001366
- Added to NRHP: July 24, 2017

The Rochambeau Worsted Company Mill is a historic textile mill complex at 60 King Street in the Olneyville neighborhood of Providence, Rhode Island. Set between King Street and the Woonasquatucket River, it is a three-story brick-clad steel frame structure, built about 1923. It was the third mill in Rhode Island in which a French system of textile processing was implemented. The business was established in 1922 by the Lepoutre Brothers, French immigrants who had first begun operations at the Lafayette Worsted Company in Woonsocket, and operated until 1956. It was thereafter occupied by the Imperial Knife Company, which operated here until 1987, manufacturing tableware.

The complex was listed on the National Register of Historic Places in 2017.

== See also ==
- National Register of Historic Places listings in Providence, Rhode Island
