= The Moog Cookbook =

American electronic band

- The Moog Cookbook posing in front of various synthesizers and keyboards, circa 1996. From left: Meco Eno and Uli Nomi.

Background information
- Origin: California
- Genres: Electronic; comedy
- Years active: 1995–1998, 2004
- Labels: Restless
- Past members: Meco Eno (Roger Manning); Uli Nomi (Brian Kehew)

The Moog Cookbook was an American electronic duo consisting of Meco Eno (Roger Manning) and Uli Nomi (Brian Kehew). The project was a parody of and tribute to the novelty Moog records of the late 1960s and early 1970s, which featured cover versions of popular songs using the then-new Moog synthesizer.

The band released two albums in the mid-1990s: The Moog Cookbook (1996) featured instrumental cover versions of contemporary alternative rock songs, while its follow-up, Ye Olde Space Bande (1997), featured similar covers of classic rock tracks. The pair reunited in 2004 to record "Bob's Funk" for the soundtrack of the film Moog, a documentary on the life of Robert Moog.

In 2005, the group independently released Bartell, an archival compilation album consisting of tracks recorded for compilations and soundtracks, remixes for other artists, holiday songs and other rarities.

== Formation and concept ==
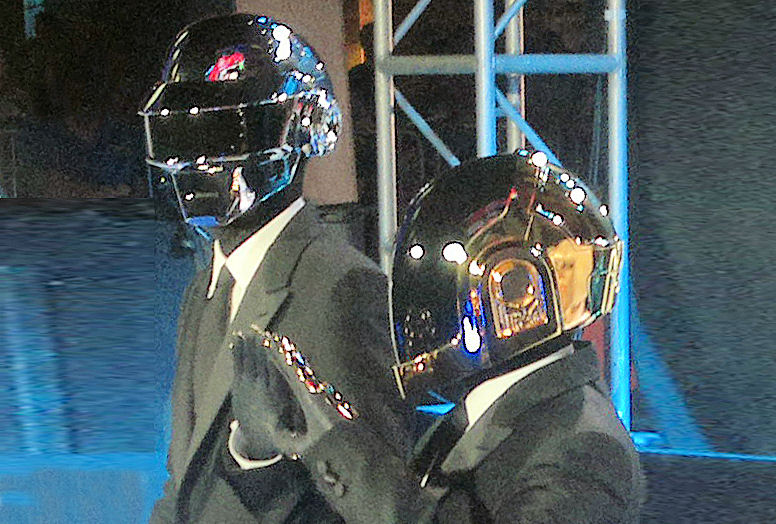
Although the similarities were coincidental, the band was sometimes compared to Daft Punk (pictured)

The Moog Cookbook was formed by Roger Manning and Brian Kehew shortly after the demise of Manning's band Jellyfish. It was conceived as both a parody of and tribute to the novelty Moog records of the late 1960s and early 1970s, which featured cover versions of popular songs using the then-new Moog synthesizer. Manning recalled that "When Brian and I finally met, we knew we had to do this, because we knew we could do it right, and we knew we had the resources — before someone else did it, and did it wrong."

The band's name is derived from a 1978 cookbook, Moog's Musical Eatery, written by Shirleigh Moog, the first wife of synthesizer pioneer Robert Moog. On stage and in their promotional materials, they donned space-suit disguises that were similar to outfits worn by another emerging electronic duo, Daft Punk. This was reportedly only a coincidence. Kehew said that "The look of Moog Cookbook can be traced back to those kinds novelty bands like the Spotnicks and French disco band, Space, who had a hit with "Magic Fly" in 1977 and wore astronaut helmets and plastic jumpsuits. I know Daft Punk were into them too."

== The Moog Cookbook and Ye Olde Space Bande ==
Their first album, The Moog Cookbook (1996), featured instrumental cover versions of contemporary alternative/modern rock songs by bands such as Soundgarden, Green Day, and Weezer. Manning said that he and Kehew "wanted to concentrate on bastardizing alternative hits. We couldn't wait to sink our teeth into songs we wanted to destroy and make really gross." Kehew said, "We would not reject any bad idea, that’s for sure." Its liner notes contained the tagline "No MIDI." This is a direct parody of the "No Synthesizers!" tagline found in the liner notes of Queen albums throughout the 1970s.

The record was critically acclaimed and became an underground hit. Music journalist Brian Chidester commented that their debut record "yielded solid overseas sales amidst the retro-obsessed landscape of Pulp Fiction, the Swing revival and thrift shop mania. The duo even performed live on MTV in full space regalia and found a small domestic audience attuned to similar electronic psych-pop coming out of Europe by bands like Stereolab, Mouse on Mars and the High Llamas."

Dave Grohl from the Foo Fighters was a fan and commissioned the duo to record a piece for an opening segment of a Foo Fighters music video. Daft Punk were also "huge fans", as Kahew remembered, "and came into the music store I was working in at the time. They were friends with Air, the French band, who came to meet us a month later." Afterward, Manning and Kehew joined Air on their first tour as supporting musicians and remixed their single "Kelly Watch the Stars" (1998).

Ever been driven to murder? I almost have. It came with a listen to the heinous torture known as the Moog Cookbook.

—Pitchfork founder Ryan Schreiber's review of Ye Olde Space Bande

In 1997, Moog Cookbook followed up with Ye Olde Space Bande (1997), which included similar covers of classic rock tracks by groups such as by Kiss, Boston, Led Zeppelin. It featured contributions from Devo's Mark Mothersbaugh, who plays on the duo's version of Van Halen's "Ain't Talkin' 'bout Love". Other musicians featured on album were the MC5's Wayne Kramer, the Go-Gos' Charlotte Caffey, and the Eels' Mark Oliver Everett.

== Later years ==
Moog Cookbook disbanded in 1998. According to Manning: "As creatively fulfilling as it was, Moog Cookbook was not financially viable. We weren't coming out of rave culture and house music like Daft Punk. Not writing original songs, we didn't see a future in continuing to make what were essentially comedy records." In Kehew's view: "Where [we] took it serious, Moog Cookbook was like Spinal Tap in so much as we loved the early synth sound enough that we could parody it. If those efforts played some small role in the larger electronic music explosion, then I'm proud of that."

In December 2014, a limited edition Christmas EP entitled Xmas Recipes (Y Mas) was released on Bandcamp. The album contained the last five tracks of the duo's previous compilation album, as well as six other holiday related tracks and rarities. The EP was only available for five days, with the official Bandcamp page being removed on 25 December.

== Discography ==
- The Moog Cookbook (1996)
- Ye Olde Space Bande (1997)
- Moog (2004) ("Bob's Funk")
- Bartell (2005) (rarities compilation)
- Xmas Recipes (Y Mas) (2014) (limited edition Christmas album/rarities compilation)
