= Ro Sham Bo (album) =

1994 studio album by The Grays

Studio album by The Grays
- Released: February 22, 1994
- Recorded: Grandmasters Recorders
- Genre: Power pop; alternative rock
- Length: 58:58
- Label: Epic
- Producer: Jack Joseph Puig

Ro Sham Bo is the first and only studio album by The Grays, released on February 22, 1994 by Epic Records.

The album was supported with a single and music video for the song, “Very Best Years”, alongside promotional singles for “Same Thing” and “Not Long for This World”.

== Background ==
According to Jason Falkner, Jon Brion initially got into contact with him after listening to a mixtape of the album Odessey and Oracle by the Zombies he had compiled for his then-girlfriend. Brion called Falkner to invite him to an informal jamming session with musicians Buddy Judge and Dan McCarroll. This however led to a record label bidding war for a supposed band composed of the four musicians. Feeling pressured to join the supposed band, Falkner reluctantly joined and the band signed with Epic Records in 1993.

The intention of the band was to be a democratic collective of musicians, rather than a hierarchical group with a leader and backing musicians. This was due in part to the group's dissatisfaction with being in a band—particularly Falkner who had just come out of a tumultuous period with the band Jellyfish. The band members would often swap instruments depending on the need of the individual song and would contribute to each other's songs.

== Release and reception ==
=== Release and promotion ===
Ro Sham Bo was released on February 22, 1994 on Epic Records. The album's lead single was the song “Very Best Years”. The single included the song “Outdoor Miner” (which was not originally included on the album) and a cover of the Rolling Stones song “Complicated”. “Very Best Years” was accompanied by a music video; it was the only song to receive a promotional video. The album was also supported with promotional singles for the songs “Same Thing” and “Not Long for This World”.

=== Critical reception ===
Professional ratings
Review scores
Source	Rating
AllMusic	4.5/5 stars

The album received highly positive reviews upon release from critics. In a retrospective analysis, Troy Carpenter of AllMusic called the album “a very eclectic pop record, stemming from the fact that the different songwriters bring distinct styles to the table.” He notes that Judge's and McCarrol's tracks were “more rhythmically focused jams” whereas Falkner's and Brion's songs “stick to ultra-cool '70s-style pop/rock”. He calls the instrumentation “thick and hearty” and notes that each of the band members come together to create a “nice musical stew, none of the ingredients outshining the others in contribution to the overall taste.”

== Aftermath ==
Despite glowing reviews from critics, Ro Sham Bo was a commercial disappointment and was the only album released by the band. The album would eventually go out-of-print. In retrospect, Falkner reflects that the band was not truly a democratic collective as he felt he was the true leader of the group. This was due in part to the fact that the album's producer, Jack Joseph Puig, admitted to enjoying Falkner's tracks the most, giving him one more song than the others on the album. This created animosity amongst the members, specifically Brion, who was the first to leave the group. This coupled with the band's lack of commercial success led to their breakup shortly thereafter.

== Track listing ==
=== UK CD: 475839 2 ===
1. "Very Best Years" (Jason Falkner) – 3:26
2. "Everybody's World" (Buddy Judge) – 5:42
3. "Same Thing" (Jon Brion) – 4:01
4. "Friend Of Mine" (Falkner) – 5:16
5. "Is It Now Yet" (Buddy Judge/Dan McCarroll) – 4:03
6. "Oh Well Maybe" (Falkner) – 3:43
7. "Nothing Between Us" (Brion) – 3:55
8. "Both Belong" (Falkner) – 4:25
9. "Nothing" (Judge) – 3:30
10. "Not Long For This World" (Brion) – 4:52
11. "Spooky" (Falkner) – 5:07
12. "All You Wanted" (Judge) – 4:30
13. "No One Can Hurt Me" (Brion) – 6:28

== Personnel ==
=== Musicians ===
- Jason Falkner – vocals, guitars, bass, keyboards
- Jon Brion – vocals, guitars, keyboards, bass
- Buddy Judge – vocals, guitars
- Dan McCarroll – drums

=== Additional musicians ===
- Lenny Castro – additional percussion
- Martin Tillman – cello

=== Production ===
- Produced by Jack Joseph Puig
- Recorded at Grandmaster Recorders Ltd., Hollywood, CA
- Assisted by S. Husky Höskulds
- Mixed at Ocean Way Studios, Hollywood, CA
- Assisted by Ken Allardyce
- Recorded and mixed by Jack Joseph Puig
- Mastered by Doug Sax at The Mastering Lab
