= Ye Olde Space Bande =

Studio album by The Moog Cookbook
- Released: October 28, 1997
- Genre: Electronic rock
- Length: 43:42
- Label: Restless

The Moog Cookbook chronology
The Moog Cookbook (1996)	Ye Olde Space Bande (1997)	Bartell (2005)

Professional ratings
Review scores
Source	Rating
AllMusic	4.5/5 stars
Entertainment Weekly	B
Pitchfork	1.0/10

Ye Olde Space Bande is the second album by the Moog Cookbook, released in 1997. It is a selection of covers of classic rock tracks remade using Moog synthesizers and other analog synthesizers. It featured contributions from Devo's Mark Mothersbaugh, who plays on the duo's version of Van Halen's "Ain't Talkin' 'bout Love", to computerized vocal samples by Michael Penn. Other musicians featured on album were the MC5's Wayne Kramer, the Go-Gos' Charlotte Caffey, and the Eels' Mark Oliver Everett.

== Track listing ==
No.	Title	Writer(s)	Original Artist	Length
1.	"Born to Be Wild"	Mars Bonfire	Steppenwolf	4:16
2.	"Cat Scratch Fever"	Ted Nugent	Ted Nugent	3:06
3.	"Sweet Home Alabama"	Ed King, Gary Rossington, Ronnie Van Zant	Lynyrd Skynyrd	4:30
4.	"More Than a Feeling"	Tom Scholz	Boston	4:05
5.	"Ain't Talkin' 'Bout Love"	Michael Anthony, David Lee Roth, Alex Van Halen, Eddie Van Halen	Van Halen	3:56
6.	"Whole Lotta Love"	John Bonham, Willie Dixon, John Paul Jones, Jimmy Page, Robert Plant	Led Zeppelin	4:20
7.	"Ziggy Stardust"	David Bowie	David Bowie	3:59
8.	"25 or 6 to 4"	Robert Lamm	Chicago	4:13
9.	"Hotel California"	Don Felder, Glenn Frey, Don Henley	The Eagles	6:34
10.	"Rock and Roll All Nite"	Gene Simmons, Paul Stanley	Kiss	4:44
Total length:				43:42
