= The Moog Cookbook (album) =

1996 album by The Moog Cookbook

Studio album by the Moog Cookbook
- Released: 1996
- Genre: Electronic rock
- Length: 45:06
- Label: Restless

The Moog Cookbook chronology
The Moog Cookbook (1996)	Ye Olde Space Bande (1997)

The Moog Cookbook is the debut record by the American electronic music duo the Moog Cookbook, released in 1996. It consists of ten cover versions of alternative rock tracks performed using Moog synthesizers and other analog synthesizers. The album was critically acclaimed and became an underground hit. In 1997, it was followed by the similar Ye Olde Space Bande.

== Critical reception ==
Professional ratings
Review scores
Source	Rating
AllMusic	4.5/5 stars
Pitchfork	3.0/10

Stereo Review praised "the delicious nastiness of The Moog Cookbook, which takes ten sacred-cow songs down a few pegs... Soundgarden's 'Black Hole Sun', for instance, becomes an unholy cross of generic bossa nova and the theme to the old Dating Game TV show, while the deep brooding of Tom Petty's 'Free Fallin'' gets trashed via robot vocals and some Rick Wakemanesque keyboard flourishes."

== Track listing ==
No.	Title	Writer(s)	Original artist	Length
1.	"Black Hole Sun"	Chris Cornell	Soundgarden	4:23
2.	"Buddy Holly"	Rivers Cuomo	Weezer	4:14
3.	"Basket Case"	Billie Joe Armstrong, Green Day	Green Day	4:04
4.	"Come Out and Play"	Dexter Holland	The Offspring	5:00
5.	"Free Fallin'"	Jeff Lynne, Tom Petty	Tom Petty	4:15
6.	"Are You Gonna Go My Way?"	Lenny Kravitz, Craig Ross	Lenny Kravitz	3:36
7.	"Smells Like Teen Spirit"	Kurt Cobain, Dave Grohl, Krist Novoselic	Nirvana	5:30
8.	"Even Flow"	Stone Gossard, Eddie Vedder	Pearl Jam	4:29
9.	"The One I Love"	Bill Berry, Peter Buck, Mike Mills, Michael Stipe	R.E.M.	4:32
10.	"Rockin' in the Free World"	Neil Young	Neil Young	5:03
Total length:				45:06
