= Brian Reitzell =

American musician

- Born: December 24, 1965 (age 60); California, U.S.
- Genres: Film score, alternative rock, ambient music, experimental
- Occupations: Composer, music supervisor, producer
- Instruments: Drums, percussion, multi instrumentalist, found sounds
- Years active: 1984–present
- Labels: Lakeshore, Ipecac, Smalltown Supersound

Brian Reitzell (born December 24, 1965) is an American musician, composer, record producer and music supervisor best known for his work on many film and TV soundtracks. He is notable for working extensively with the American film director Sofia Coppola (The Virgin Suicides, Lost in Translation, Marie Antoinette, The Bling Ring). He was formerly the drummer for the LA punk band Redd Kross. He has collaborated extensively with the French electronica duo Air, having performed drums on their albums The Virgin Suicides and 10 000 Hz Legend. Reitzell also toured with the band on their "Moon Safari" tour in 1998 and again in 2000 and 2001. In 2003, he was nominated for a BAFTA, along with Kevin Shields of My Bloody Valentine, for the score to Lost in Translation.

He is a member of the (side project) synth pop band TV Eyes alongside Roger Joseph Manning, Jr. and Jason Falkner.

In 2012, Reitzell scored Turner Prize winning UK artist Elizabeth Price's video installation, "West Hinder".

His first solo album, Auto Music, was released by Smalltown Supersound on June 17, 2014.

== Works ==
Year	Title	Credited as		Notes
Year	Title	Music Supervisor	Composer	Notes
1999	The Virgin Suicides	Yes		
2000	Logan's Sanctuary		Yes	
2001	CQ	Yes		
2003	Lost in Translation	Yes		
2004	Friday Night Lights	Yes	Yes	with Explosions in the Sky; David Torn
2005	Thumbsucker	Yes		
2006	Marie Antoinette	Yes		
2006	Stranger than Fiction	Yes	Yes	
2007	30 Days of Night	Yes	Yes	
2008	The Brothers Bloom	Yes		
2009	Shrink		Yes	
2010	Peacock		Yes	
2010	Beginners		Yes	
2011	Red Riding Hood	Yes	Yes	with Alex Heffes
2011	Red Faction: Armageddon		Yes	Video game
2011	Boss	Yes	Yes	18 episodes
2012	Awake		Yes	1 episode
2013	The Bling Ring	Yes	Yes	with Daniel Lopatin
2013	Hannibal	Yes	Yes	39 episodes
2014	Watch Dogs		Yes	Video game
2016	Kicks		Yes	
2017	American Gods	Yes	Yes	8 episodes
2018	Black Mirror: Bandersnatch		Yes	Interactive film
2020	Relic		Yes	
2023	Dark Harvest		Yes	

== Discography ==
- Auto Music (2014, Smalltown Supersound)
