= TV Eyes =

American synthpop band

- Origin: United States
- Genres: Synthpop, new wave
- Members: Jason Falkner; Roger Joseph Manning Jr.; Brian Reitzell

TV Eyes is an American synthpop group, consisting of Jason Falkner, Roger Joseph Manning Jr. and Brian Reitzell.

They released their self-titled debut album in November 2006 in Japan, and re-released it internationally in 2014.

An EP entitled Softcore was released on July 2, 2008, in Japan.
