= The Grays (band) =

US rock group

- The Grays c. 1994. Counter-clockwise from left: Buddy Judge, Jason Falkner, Dan McCarroll and Jon Brion.

Background information
- Origin: Los Angeles, California, U.S.
- Genres: Rock; pop; power pop
- Years active: 1993-1994
- Label: Epic
- Past members: Jason Falkner; Jon Brion; Buddy Judge; Dan McCarroll

The Grays were a short-lived rock band comprising singer/songwriters/multi-instrumentalists Jon Brion, Jason Falkner, Buddy Judge, and Dan McCarroll. They released only one album, the out-of-print but highly regarded Ro Sham Bo (1994) on Sony/Epic Records.

== History ==
=== Formation ===
According to Jason Falkner, Jon Brion initially got into contact with him after listening to a mixtape of the album Odessey and Oracle by the Zombies he had compiled for his then-girlfriend. Brion called Falkner to invite him to an informal jamming session with musicians Buddy Judge and Dan McCarroll. The meeting caught the attention of a music executive and led to a record label bidding war for a supposed band composed of the four musicians. Feeling pressured to join the supposed band, Falkner reluctantly joined and the band signed with Epic Records in 1993.

The intention of the band was to be a democratic collective of musicians, rather than a hierarchical group with a leader and backing musicians. This was due in part to the group's dissatisfaction with being in a band—particularly Falkner who had just come out of a tumultuous period with the band Jellyfish. The band members would often swap instruments depending on the need of the individual song and would contribute to each other's songs.

=== Ro Sham Bo ===
The band released its first and only album Ro Sham Bo on February 22, 1994, on Epic Records. The album's lead single was the song “Very Best Years”. The song was accompanied by a music video; it was the only song to receive a promotional video. “Very Best Years” received minor radio play and its video received minor airplay on MTV.

=== Breakup ===
Despite glowing reviews from critics, Ro Sham Bo was a commercial disappointment and was the only album released by the band. The album would later go out-of-print. In retrospect, Falkner reflects that the band was not truly a democratic collective as he felt he was the true leader of the group. This was due in part to the fact that the album's producer, Jack Joseph Puig, admitted to enjoying Falkner's tracks the most, giving him one more song than the others on the album. This created animosity amongst the members, specifically Brion, who was the first to leave the group. This coupled with the band's lack of commercial success led to their breakup shortly thereafter.

== Members ==
- Jason Falkner – vocals, guitars, bass, keyboards
- Jon Brion – vocals, guitars, keyboards, bass
- Buddy Judge – vocals, guitars
- Dan McCarroll – drums

== Discography ==
- Ro Sham Bo (1994)
