= Happy corner =

Form of bullying or rough play

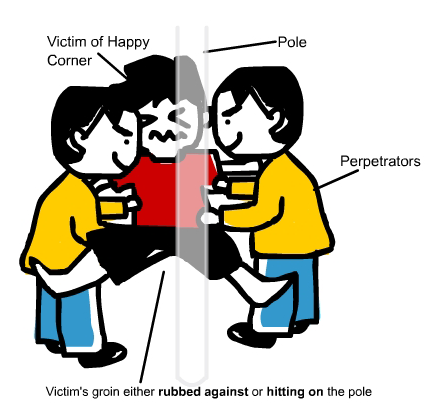
A depiction of happy corner

Happy corner, also known as aluba (simplified Chinese: 阿鲁巴; traditional Chinese: 阿魯巴; pinyin: ālǔbā), is a form of prank, game, or bullying that primarily occurs in mainland China, Hong Kong, Macau, Taiwan and Malaysia, generally among male students, in which the victim is lifted up by several perpetrators who subsequently bump his groin against a pole-shaped object.

== Prevalence and effects ==
In a 2004 survey of students from 8 universities by Hong Kong's U-Beat Magazine, 46% of the students surveyed have subjected someone else to happy corner, of whom 98% are males. 58% of male students reported having subjected someone else to happy corner, and one in ten respondents reported suffering injury as a result of happy corner. Nine in ten respondents who had engaged in happy corner reported experiencing greater affinity with both the person subjected to happy corner and other participants afterwards.

=== Injuries and incidents ===
In 2007, a Taiwanese middle school student suffered injuries after being subjected to aluba by four classmates. According to TVBS, this was first incident in which aluba led to a civil suit in Taiwan.

In 2009, a Taiwanese middle school student suffered injuries that required surgery after being subjected to aluba. The matter was settled out of court for NT$500,000.

CUHK Medical Centre urologist Chen Longwei indicates that happy corner carries a risk of injuries to the genitals. Chen points out that men may receive injuries to the penile tunica albuginea or suffer a bent penis, while women may receive injuries to the vulva, vagina, urethra, or hymen.

== Motives ==
=== Rough play and homosocial interactions ===
A 2017 research paper that interviewed 45 Taiwanese men found that common motives for engaging in aluba include celebrating special occasions, punishing other students, and resolving disputes. The researchers indicate that aluba often occurs without regard to disparities in power or popularity and, in spite of the apparent violation of the target's autonomy, generally occurs between close friends and with implicit consent.

Summarizing previous research, Li Peiwen notes that aluba allows school-aged boys to build intimacy with each other in a societal context in which gentler forms of physical affection may be perceived as indicators of homosexuality or effeminacy.

=== Bullying and hazing ===
In their 2017 paper, Bih Herng-dar, Huang Haitao, Hung Wen-lung, and Pan Bo-han dispute scholarly works and legislative efforts that have categorized aluba as a form of bullying. In a 2011 research paper, Bih and Huang also dispute the claim that aluba is a form of hazing, noting that in contrast to secretive initiation rituals, the practice generally occurs in the open.

Nevertheless, Bih and Huang link aluba to "ritualistic games of initiation" involving vulnerability, noting that it involves a symbolic attack on the male genitals. The game serves to test the risk-taking ability of the person subjected to aluba as well as his trust in those conducting aluba, and also serves to separate those who belong in a peer group from those to be excluded.

=== Reinforcement of gender roles ===
Bih Herng-dar and Huang Haitao note that aluba is an overwhelmingly male activity, and that the activity reinforces and confirms the masculinity of the participants. They cite one interviewee who indicated that aluba is more appropriate for boys as a celebratory activity in contrast to more "girlish" activities like cutting birthday cakes, and also note that the protestations of the person subjected to aluba serves as a "symbolic verification" that he has a penis. Bih and Huang indicate that both female students and gay men often perceive aluba as an immature activity.

== Responses ==
Taiwan's Ministry of National Defense and Ministry of Education issued directives forbidding the practice in 2004.
