= List of Camper Van Beethoven band members =

The following is a complete chronology of the various line-ups of alternative rock music group Camper Van Beethoven. Camper Van Beethoven (originally called "Camper Van Beethoven and the Border Patrol,") formed in 1983 in Redlands, California, before relocating to Santa Cruz, California in 1984 and San Francisco, California in 1988. Prior to Camper Van Beethoven, band members David Lowery, Chris Molla, Victor Krummenacher and Bill McDonald played in several similarly conceived groups, with names like the Estonian Gauchos and Sitting Duck, that performed songs later found in the Camper Van Beethoven repertoire. Other members of these groups included Johnny Hickman and Eric Laing.

Camper Van Beethoven were inactive between late 1990 and 1999. Since reforming at this time, their lineup has been loosely defined, with several members acting as occasional or part-time collaborators, although the lineup has solidified around the five constant members in recent years.

Camper Van Beethoven line-ups
(1983–1984) as Camper Van Beethoven and the Border Patrol	David Lowery – vocals, bass, guitar; Chris Molla – guitar, vocals; Victor Krummenacher – bass, vocals; David McDaniel – guitar, vocals; Daniel Blume – violin; Mike Zorn – harmonica; Bill McDonald – drums	
(1984)	David Lowery – vocals, guitar; Chris Molla – guitar, vocals; Jonathan Segel – violin, keyboards, guitar, vocals; Victor Krummenacher – bass, vocals; Richie West – drums	
(1985) as Camper Van Beethoven	David Lowery – vocals, guitar; Chris Molla – guitar, vocals; Jonathan Segel – violin, keyboards, guitar, vocals; Victor Krummenacher – bass, vocals; Anthony Guess – drums	Telephone Free Landslide Victory (1985)
(1985)	David Lowery – vocals, guitar, drums; Chris Molla – guitar, pedal-steel, vocals, drums; Greg Lisher – guitar; Jonathan Segel – violin, keyboards, guitar, mandolin, sitar, vocals; Victor Krummenacher – bass, vocals	II & III (1986)
(1986)	David Lowery – vocals, guitar; Chris Molla – guitar, pedal-steel, vocals; Greg Lisher – guitar; Jonathan Segel – violin, keyboards, guitar, mandolin, sitar, vocals; Victor Krummenacher – bass, vocals; Chris Pedersen – drums	
(1986)	David Lowery – vocals, guitar; Chris Molla – guitar, pedal steel, vocals; Greg Lisher – guitar; Jonathan Segel – violin, keyboards, guitar, bass, mandolin, sitar, vocals; Victor Krummenacher – bass, vocals; Chris Pedersen – drums; Eugene Chadbourne – guitar, banjo (studio session member)	Camper Van Beethoven (1986)
(1986)	David Lowery – vocals, guitar; Greg Lisher – guitar; Jonathan Segel – violin, keyboards, guitar, mandolin, sitar, vocals; Victor Krummenacher – bass, vocals; Chris Pedersen – drums	
(1986)	David Lowery – vocals, guitar; Chris Molla – guitar, pedal steel, vocals; Greg Lisher – guitar; Jonathan Segel – violin, keyboards, guitar, mandolin, sitar, vocals; Victor Krummenacher – bass, vocals; Chris Pedersen – drums	
(1986–1989)	David Lowery – vocals, guitar; Greg Lisher – guitar; Jonathan Segel – violin, keyboards, guitar, mandolin, vocals; Victor Krummenacher – bass, vocals; Chris Pedersen – drums	Our Beloved Revolutionary Sweetheart (1988)
(1989)	David Lowery – vocals, guitar; Greg Lisher – guitar, vocals; Don Lax – violin; Victor Krummenacher – bass, vocals; Chris Pedersen – drums, vocals	
(1989–1990)	David Lowery – vocals, guitar; Greg Lisher – guitar, vocals; Morgan Fichter – violin, vocals; Victor Krummenacher – bass, vocals; Chris Pedersen – drums, vocals	Key Lime Pie (1990)
(1990)	David Lowery – vocals, guitar; Greg Lisher – guitar, vocals; Morgan Fichter – violin, vocals; Victor Krummenacher – bass, vocals; David Immerglück – guitar, lap steel guitar, mandolin vocals; Chris Pedersen – drums	Greatest Hits Played Faster (2004)
(1999–2000)	David Lowery – vocals, guitar; Greg Lisher – guitar; Jonathan Segel – violin, keyboards, guitar, vocals; Victor Krummenacher – bass, vocals	Camper Van Beethoven Is Dead. Long Live Camper Van Beethoven (2000); Tusk (2002)
(2000–2005)	David Lowery – vocals, guitar; Greg Lisher – guitar; Jonathan Segel – violin, keyboards, guitar, vocals; Victor Krummenacher – bass, vocals; David Immerglück – guitar, lap steel guitar, mandolin, backup vocals (part-time); Chris Pedersen – drums (part-time); Chris Molla – guitar, keyboards (studio only); Kenny Margolis – keyboards, accordion (live only); Frank Funaro – drums (live only)	In the Mouth of the Crocodile – Live in Seattle (2004); New Roman Times (2004)
(2005–2016)	David Lowery – vocals, guitar; Greg Lisher – guitar, vocals; Jonathan Segel – violin, keyboards, guitar, vocals; Victor Krummenacher – bass, vocals; Frank Funaro – drums, vocals	Discotheque CVB: Live In Chicago (2005); Popular Songs of Great Enduring Strength and Beauty (2008): five re-recorded tracks; La Costa Perdida (2013); El Camino Real (2014)
(2016–present)	David Lowery – vocals, guitar; Greg Lisher – guitar, vocals; Jonathan Segel – violin, keyboards, guitar, mandolin, sitar, tambourine, ektara, maracas, harmonica, dulcimer, vocals; Victor Krummenacher – bass, vocals; Chris Pedersen – drums, vocals	
