= Jonathan Segel discography =

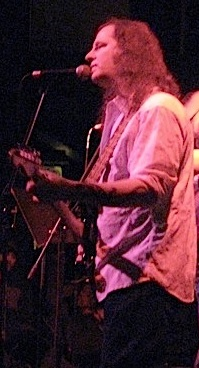

This article presents a discography of multi-instrumentalist Jonathan Segel.

== Solo recordings and major side projects ==
=== Solo recordings ===
- Storytelling (1988)
- Edgy Not Antsy (2003)
- Honey (2007)
- All Attractions (2012)
- Apricot Jam (2012)
- Shine Out (2014)

=== Hieronymus Firebrain ===
- Hieronymus Firebrain (1991)
- Dr. Firebrain's Plane Crash Tape, Vol. 1 (1993)
- There (1994)
- Here (1994)

=== Jack and Jill ===
- Chill and Shrill (1995)
- Fancy Birdhouse (1997)
- Scissors and Paper (2000)

=== Chaos Butterfly ===
- Live at Studio Fabriken (2005) – live in Gothenburg, Sweden, with Biggi Vinkeloe
- threelivingthings (2005)
- Radio (2005)

=== Electronic and electro-acoustic solo projects ===
- Non-Linear Accelerator (2003)
- Rauk (2005)
- Amnesia/Glass Box (2005)
- Summerleaf (2006)
- Underwater Tigers (2007)

=== Various artists compilations ===
- Acoustic Music Project – A Benefit for Project Open Hand (1990)
- Pushing the Norton (1994) – as 5th Business

== with Camper Van Beethoven ==
=== Studio albums ===
- Telephone Free Landslide Victory (1985)
- II & III (1986)
- Camper Van Beethoven (1986)
- Vampire Can Mating Oven (1987, EP)
- Our Beloved Revolutionary Sweetheart (1988)
- Tusk (2002)
- New Roman Times (2004)
- Popular Songs of Great Enduring Strength and Beauty (2008)
- La Costa Perdida (2013)
- El Camino Real (2014)

=== Live recordings and compilations ===
- Camper Vantiquities (1993) – rarities compilation
- The Virgin Years (1993) – with Cracker
- Camper Van Beethoven Is Dead. Long Live Camper Van Beethoven (2000) – rarities compilation
- Cigarettes & Carrot Juice: The Santa Cruz Years (2002) – box set
  - includes Telephone Free Landslide Victory, II & III, Camper Van Beethoven, Camper Vantiquities, & Greatest Hits Played Faster (bonus live disc)
- In the Mouth of the Crocodile - Live in Seattle (2004) – live album
- Discotheque CVB: Live In Chicago (2005) – live album
- Look at All the Love We Found (2005) – appearance on Sublime tribute album

== with Eugene Chadbourne ==
- Camper Van Chadbourne (1987)
- Eddie Chatterbox Double Trio Love Album (1988)
- Eugene Van Beethoven's 69th Sin-Funny (1991)
- Used Record Pile (1999)
- Revenge of Camper Van Chadbourne (1999)
- PsyCHADelidoowop (2001)

== Other recordings ==
=== with Øresund Space Collective ===
- Different Creatures (2015)
- Ode to a Black Hole (2016)

=== Improvisational recordings ===
- Tempted to Smile (2003) – with Fred Frith and Joëlle Léandre
- Gen (2003) – with Shoko Hikage
- Japan Improv CD Magazine (2003) – with Brent Larner's M-7 Ensemble
- Music + One (2006) – various artists, with Jon Raskin and Myles Boisen
- An Inescapable Siren Within Earshot... (2006) – with Moe! Staiano's Moe!Kestra
- Sonic Demons (2009) – with Lucio Menegon
- Emergency Rental (2011) – with Emergency String (X)tet and Rent Romus
- Skatch Surveillance (2012) – with T.D. Skatchit & Company

=== Additional side projects ===
- Granfaloon Bus, A Love Restrained (1992)
- Dieselhed, Dieselhed (1994)
- Dent, Stimmung (1995)
- The Electric Chairmen, Toast (1996) – with John Kruth and Victor Krummenacher
- The Lords of Howling, BaltimorePearlCrescentWhiteAdmiralSisterMeadowPaintedGodWillVisitYou (1997)
- Dent, Verstärker (1998)
- The Container, The Container (1998) – with Clyde Wrenn
- Clyde Wrenn, Long Day's Journey into Night (1999)
- The Noodle Shop, MoonDog Girl (1999) – with John Kruth, Elliott Sharp and Atilla Engin
- Clyde Wrenn, The Blue Cliff Record (2001)
- The Shimmers, The Way You Shine (2006)
- The Artichoke Project, Stimoceiver (2008)
- John Kruth, Splitsville – Sonic Impressions of Croatia (2008)

=== Selected guest appearances ===
- Yo, Once in a Blue Moon (1986)
- Frontier Wives, Rockinghorse Violins (1987)
- Spot 1019, This World Owes me a Buzz (1987)
- The Young Fresh Fellows, The Men Who Loved Music(1987)
- Walkabouts, Cataract (1988)
- Overwhelming Colorfast, Overwhelming Colorfast (1991)
- Big City Orchestra, Greatest Hits and Test Tones (1998) + various other BCO releases
- The Loud Family, Days for Days (1998)
- Magnet, Sharkbait (1999)
- Sparklehorse, Distorted Ghost (1999)
- Alison Faith Levy, My World View (2000)
- Victor Krummenacher, Bittersweet (2000)
- Mike Levy, Fireflies (2000)
- LD & the New Criticism, Tragic Realism (2006)
- Mossyrock, I Know I'm Not Wrong EP (2007)
- Victor Krummenacher, Patriarch's Blues (2008)
- Victor Krummenacher, Hard to See Trouble Coming (2015)

== Soundtracks ==
Film soundtracks:

- The Invisibles – directed by Noah Stern (1999)
- Bunny – directed by Mia Trachinger (2000)
- Kickin' Chicken – directed by Joy Phillips (2001)
- 100% Human Hair – directed by Ann Kaneko (2001)
- Love Will Travel – directed by Teddi Bennett (2002)
- Bill's Run – directed by Richard Kassebaum (2004)
