= Popular Songs of Great Enduring Strength and Beauty =

Popular Songs Of Great Enduring Strength And Beauty

Compilation album by Camper Van Beethoven
- Released: June 2008
- Genre: Alternative rock
- Length: 64:52
- Label: Cooking Vinyl

Camper Van Beethoven chronology
Discotheque CVB: Live in Chicago (2004)	Popular Songs Of Great Enduring Strength And Beauty (2008)	La Costa Perdida (2013)

Professional ratings
Review scores
Source	Rating
Allmusic	link

Popular Songs Of Great Enduring Strength And Beauty is a compilation album by American alternative rock group Camper Van Beethoven released in 2008 on the Cooking Vinyl label.

== Track listing ==
1. The Day That Lassie Went To The Moon (3:13) [from Telephone Free Landslide Victory (1985)]
2. Border Ska (2:50) [from Telephone Free Landslide Victory (1985)]
3. Take the Skinheads Bowling (2:28) [from Telephone Free Landslide Victory (1985)]
4. Pictures of Matchstick Men (4:08) [re-recorded, original version from Key Lime Pie (1989)]
5. Skinhead Stomp (1:48) [from Telephone Free Landslide Victory (1985)]
6. Opie Rides Again/Club Med Sucks (3:53) [from Telephone Free Landslide Victory (1985)]
7. Eye of Fatima Parts 1 & 2 (4:55) [re-recorded, original version from Our Beloved Revolutionary Sweetheart (1988)]
8. ZZ Top Goes To Egypt (3:08) [from II & III (1986)]
9. Sad Lover's Waltz (4:09) [from II & III (1986)]
10. When I Win The Lottery (3:37) [re-recorded, original version from Key Lime Pie (1989)]
11. The History Of Utah (2:52) [from Camper Van Beethoven (1986)]
12. Seven Languages (4:07) [from Vampire Can Mating Oven (1987)]
13. All Her Favourite Fruit (5:14) [re-recorded, original version from Key Lime Pie (1989)]
14. Good Guys And Bad Guys (4:49) [from Camper Van Beethoven (1986)]
15. Circles (3:03) [from II & III (1986)]
16. One Of These Days (3:26) [re-recorded, original version from Our Beloved Revolutionary Sweetheart (1988)]
17. Ambiguity Song (2:29) [from Telephone Free Landslide Victory (1985)]
18. Shut Us Down (1:16) [from Camper Van Beethoven (1986)]
