= Forgery (album) =

Studio album by Monks of Doom
- Released: 1992
- Genre: Alternative rock
- Label: I.R.S.
- Producer: Dan Fredman

Monks of Doom chronology
The Insect God EP (1992)	Forgery (1992)	What's Left for Kicks? (2006)

Forgery is an album by the American band Monks of Doom, released in 1992. It was the band's first album to be distributed by a major label, and their second after the breakup of the members' former band, Camper Van Beethoven. Monks of Doom supported the album with a North American tour.

== Production ==
A loose concept album about fabrication and deception, Forgery was produced by Dan Fredman. "Tanguedia" and its reprise are tributes to the Argentine musician Astor Piazzolla.

== Critical reception ==
Professional ratings
Review scores
Source	Rating
AllMusic	3/5 stars
Chicago Tribune	2/4 stars
MusicHound Rock: The Essential Album Guide	2.5/5 stars
The Press of Atlantic City	3/4 stars

Trouser Press wrote that "it's a tight and cleanly played record but, as with the Monks' entire oeuvre, the literate songs and sounds come too often from the head and too rarely from the heart." Guitar Player deemed the album "modern psychedelia for the smart drug generation." The Province considered the album's songs to be "projections of a modern, unfussy but subtly complex expression of progressive-rock." The Chicago Tribune concluded that Forgery "is something indulgent and bloodless, with bassist Victor Krummenacher delivering crypto-important metaphors that fail to touch any nerves."

Stereo Review called it "pretentious undergrad rock reminiscent of Camper at its most terminally twee." The Milwaukee Journal praised the album's first track, "Flint Jack", describing it as "a ska beat rumbling in slow motion under some spry, acrobatic guitar sprints." The Philadelphia Daily News declared that "Forgery is one pop product that dares to be art and actually succeeds." The St. Louis Post-Dispatch stated that Monks of Doom have "once again abandoned standard rock decorum to explore new music worlds via thrashing guitar leads, primitive synthesizers and acoustic guitars, and rippling syncopations."

AllMusic wrote that the album combines "the quirky, off-kilter elements of Camper with a more streamlined, straightforward rocking approach."

== Track listing ==
No.	Title	Length
1.	"Flint Jack"
2.	"Flow"
3.	"Tanguedia (For Astor Piazzolla)"
4.	"Virtual Lover"
5.	"Queen of Fortune"
6.	"Dust"
7.	"What Does a Man Require?"
8.	"A.O.A."
9.	"Cigarette Man (Cast of Characters)"
10.	"Off on a Comet"
11.	"Tanguedia (Reprise)"
12.	"Chaos is Not Dead"

== Personnel ==
- David Immerglück – guitars, backing vocals, organ, synthesizer, mandolin
- Greg Lisher – guitar, backing vocals, piano
- Victor Krummenacher – bass, lead vocals, organ, piano, guitar
- Chris Pedersen – drums, percussion, typewriter
