= Chris Pedersen (musician) =

American drummer

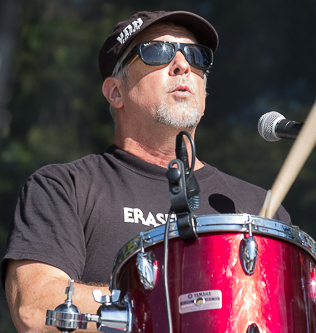
- Pedersen in 2014

Background information
- Also known as: Crispy Dersen
- Born: August 16, 1960 (age 66)
- Genres: Rock, alternative rock
- Occupations: Musician, Songwriter
- Instruments: Drums, percussion
- Years active: 198?–present

Chris Pedersen (born August 16, 1960) is an American-born musician, best known as the drummer of the groups Camper Van Beethoven and Monks of Doom. He currently resides in Australia.

== Musical career ==
Pedersen first played with Camper Van Beethoven members David Lowery and Chris Molla in the band Box O' Laffs in the early 1980s. When earlier Camper Van Beethoven drummer Anthony Guess (also a former drummer for Box O' Laffs) left Camper Van Beethoven following their debut album tour in fall of 1985, the group was temporarily without a drummer. Lowery and Molla filled in, also remixing Guess's prerecorded percussion work during much of the recording of their second album, 1986's II & III. Pedersen joined as these recording sessions were finishing, and ended up playing on the track "We're A Bad Trip."

Pedersen also played on the albums Camper Van Beethoven, Our Beloved Revolutionary Sweetheart and Key Lime Pie. In 1986, he also started the spin-off band Monks of Doom with Camper Van Beethoven members Molla, Greg Lisher, and Victor Krummenacher. In 1990, Camper Van Beethoven disbanded, and Pedersen continued playing in the Monks of Doom, now featuring David Immerglück as a replacement for Molla. The Monks of Doom disbanded in 1993 when Immerglück left the band to focus on full-time studio work. Pedersen moved to Australia in 1998, and the Monks of Doom reunited to play "final" shows before his move.

Although Pedersen still resides in Australia, he has spent time in the United States, playing with a reunited Camper Van Beethoven and Monks of Doom. Pedersen played most of the drum parts on the Camper Van Beethoven reunion album New Roman Times in 2004, as well as on two tracks on their 2013 album La Costa Perdida. He also played on the cover album What's Left For Kicks? made by the reunited Monks and occasionally flies to the United States for live performances and studio work with both bands. This activity has intensified since late 2014, with Pedersen playing on most live Camper dates, as their regular live drummer Frank Funaro has been sidelined due to health issues.
