= Who Are the Brain Police? =

Single by The Mothers of Invention

from the album Freak Out!
- B-side: "Trouble Every Day"
- Released: 1966
- Recorded: March 9, 1966
- Genre: Experimental rock; psychedelic rock
- Length: 3:22
- Label: Verve
- Songwriter: Frank Zappa
- Producer: Frank Zappa

The Mothers of Invention singles chronology
"How Could I Be Such a Fool?" (1966)	"Who Are the Brain Police?" (1966)	"Big Leg Emma" (1967)

"Who Are the Brain Police?" is a Frank Zappa song, performed by The Mothers of Invention, released on the Mothers' debut album, Freak Out!. It was released by Verve Records as a single in 1966. Zappa said the song had a religious theme, according to one source.

Zappa wrote about the song on the Freak Out! liner notes: "At five o’clock in the morning someone kept singing this in my mind and made me write it down. I will admit to being frightened when I finally played it out loud and sang the words."

In a 1988 interview, Zappa added:

A lot of people police their own brains. They're like citizen soldiers, so to speak. I've seen people who will willingly arrest, try and punish their own brains. Now that's really sad. That's vigilante brain policism. It's not even official, it's like self-imposed. ... It's hard to pin it down to one central agency when you realize that so many people are willing to do it to themselves. I mean, the people who want to become amateur brain police, their numbers grow every day – people who say to themselves, 'I couldn't possibly consider that', and then spank themselves for even getting that far. So, you don't even need to blame it on a central brain police agency. You've got plenty of people who willingly subject themselves to this self-mutilation.

== Song structure ==
The song's structure was described in detail by AllMusic:

Simply put, it is weird and creepy. A chorus of living-dead voices supports a slow and sloppy waltz beat. Lyrics make numerous references to melting plastic and chromium and repeatedly ask the question found in the song's title (answered by the brainless chorus). Halfway through, the song breaks into a fast-paced bridge; the same happens in the coda, which includes a kazoo solo.

== Critical reception ==
The song was stated to be a "direct defiance of top 40 radio". Repetitive lyrics were noted as part of this "defiance". The song was also cited by Mojo magazine as "one of the scariest songs to ever emerge from the rock psyche". While comparing it to Kafka, Mojo described the song as "a vision of contemporary America where personal identity and individuality is erased".

== Personnel ==
- Frank Zappa – guitar, vocals
- Ray Collins – vocals
- Jimmy Carl Black – drums
- Roy Estrada – bass guitar
- Elliot Ingber – guitar

with:

- Eugene Di Novi – piano
- Gene Estes – percussion
- Neil LeVang – guitar

== Covers ==
- Camper Van Beethoven – 2000 rarities compilation, Camper Van Beethoven Is Dead. Long Live Camper Van Beethoven.
- Mark Nauseef – Snake Music
- Monks of Doom – The Insect God. EP
- The Molecules – Bootleg or Rootleg
- The Ed Palermo Big Band – tribute album, The Ed Palermo Big Band Plays the Music of Frank Zappa
- Jon Poole – What's The Ugliest Part Of Your Body?
