= Kevtone =

American musician (born 1964)

kevtone
- Also known as: Anthony Guess
- Born: Kevin Anthony Guess; December 30, 1964 (age 61)
- Origin: King City, California
- Occupation: songwriter/percussionist
- Instruments: drums, vocals, loops, synthesizer, keyboards
- Years active: 1979–present
- Labels: I.R.S. Records; Cooking Vinyl Records; Popular Metaphysics/MCA; Echo Records
- Website: Musician Page for kevtone

Kevtone (born Kevin Anthony Guess, December 30, 1964) is an American musician, percussionist, and songwriter from Seattle, Washington. Performing live and in studio, his rhythm style may best be described as improvisational, melodic, progressive, and bluesy, reflecting influences from many genres of music.

He is perhaps best known for his work as the original drummer for the Santa Cruz, California, band Camper Van Beethoven, playing on all 17 tracks of their album Telephone Free Landslide Victory and many other tracks from various other Camper Van Beethoven releases. He was also the principal drummer for Calm Down Juanita, World Entertainment War, Heaven On, Box O' Laffs, I Die Every Day, and he is currently the drummer for Fearporn.

== Biography ==
Guess was born and raised in King City, California, where he started playing drums as a young child. He attended San Lorenzo Elementary School in King City, where he studied music under Bruce Graham and later, Leon Olson, bandleader at King City Joint Union High School. At age 15, he played in It Became Monster (IBM) with Fidel Tirado and occasionally David Rodriguez, with whom he also played in another band, Whirlwind. At 16, he played in the Red Mountain Band with Pete Carney and with his elementary school drum teacher, Bruce Graham. He also played drums in many other duos and combos with local groups around the Salinas Valley.

Around 1981, he began traveling to Santa Cruz with guitarist and childhood friend, Fidel Tirado, with whom he played in a duo, to take drum lessons from Rick Walker and to play music with Tirado; sometimes taking the Greyhound bus both ways, for the 75 mile trip to Santa Cruz to take those one-hour lessons. From 1983 to 1984, he played in a reggae band from Salinas, called Katchabeat, with bassist Roger Rodgers and Brett Briggs on guitar, and then later with Kevin Nuckolls. on guitar in Briggs' place. Eventually, Guess left Katchabeat and he was replaced on drums by Nuckolls' brother, Darren Nuckolls. Guess also played drums in Grupo Tres Angles, teaming with Rodgers on bass again with guitarist Brett Briggs.

Guess moved to Santa Cruz, California, in 1984, a year after Tirado moved there, and he continued taking drum instruction from Rick Walker, who was at the time the drummer for the Santa Cruz band Tao Chemical.

In 1985, performing as Anthony Guess, kevtone was principal drummer for the eclectic Santa Cruz band Box O' Laffs, playing with bassist David Lowery and keyboardist Chris Molla (both later of Camper Van Beethoven also) and also with guitarist Chris Hart and vocalist Eric Curkendall, on Box O' Laffs' 1985 album, Dogbook.

Around the same time, the rhythm team of Guess and Nuckolls joined Heaven On; a young band formed around 1985 also, by vocalist and lyricist Xtremity X and guitarist George Earth, who had been working as a roadie for Guess' drum instructor's band. Keyboardist Kennedy Cosker, of The Quiet Ones, with whom Guess had previously played, joined Xtremity, Earth, Nuckolls, and Guess at the last minute, to compete in a contest, and together the five-member band won the 1986 Battle of the Bands at the Louden Nelson Center for Performing Arts in Santa Cruz. Heaven On disbanded shortly after that performance, though Guess, Nuckolls, and Earth would form a separate improvisation performance project that year and continue on as Circus Boy. They performed two shows in that grouping, once at a house party and once at Diane's Place in Santa Cruz, before Guess and Earth began jamming with bassist Daniel Vee Lewis, Lewis' wife, Pipa Piñon, and keyboardist David Hannibal.

Anthony Guess played, recorded with, and contributed work to the alternative rock band Camper Van Beethoven on several releases, including their 1985 debut, the critically acclaimed and influential Telephone Free Landslide Victory, with its hit "Take the Skinheads Bowling"; in a lineup that included vocalist and guitarist Lowery, bassist Victor Krummenacher, violinist Jonathan Segel, and guitarist Molla.

In 1986, Guess and George Earth together conceived of the unnamed band that would later become World Entertainment War. Guess played drums and co-wrote songs with Earth on lead guitar. They invited both Daniel Vee Lewis and David Hannibal to play bass and keyboards, respectively, for the new group, which still remained nameless. Rick Walker suggested they contact another local musician friend of his, Rob Brezsny, also of Tao Chemical, who was developing a new and broad idea that he called "World Entertainment War". After seeing Brezsny perform a spoken word show to a pre-recorded music tape, they did a jam show together a few weeks later. Brezsny was invited to join the band as lead vocalist and co-writer and together they then adopted the name and the concept, World Entertainment War. Singer Darby Gould was recruited six months later to join the band as co-lead vocalist. Keyboardist Hannibal left the band shortly and was replaced briefly by Sam Loya, who was then replaced by Amy Excolere. They performed regularly and recorded two albums; a self-titled debut and a follow-up called Give Too Much, consisting of the same recordings with two added tracks recorded at the same time, both released in 1991 by MCA Records. Guess continued doing live performances with World Entertainment War in a variety of venues until the group disbanded in 1993.

Guess and bassist Daniel Lewis would later join another Santa Cruz-based band, Jivehounds, playing disco and old-school funk with vocalist Dante Dark and keyboardist Derek Sherinian. Guess played with them briefly and also was playing at the time with Shrida Honky, Cake, and Violin Sanity with Jim Hurley.

Guess left Santa Cruz in the summer of 1994, and moved to Seattle, Washington, where he would go on to perform as Kevin Guess. He continued playing and recording with a wide variety of other bands and performers; most notably, the Seattle-based Calm Down Juanita, a writing collaboration he formed with Steve Wilmans and Tyler Willman, that drew several other notable musicians into the studio with them, including bassist R. Cole Peterson, III, bassist-recording engineer Steve Feasley, saxophonist Skerik, Stone Gossard, Josh Freese, and John Doe. That project produced two albums, Calm Down Juanita and Undertown.

Since 2000, Kevtone has worked with spoken word artist, Chris Daikos and has recorded several avant-garde songs with Daikos. Recordings included musicians such as Bob Antone, Alan Paisley, Steve Feasley, Chris Cronas and "Bama" James Ray.

He continues his professional work as kevtone; recording or performing in some capacity with many other bands, including I Die Every Day, with James Stamper and Bama James Ray, in 2007 he was the drummer for the Left Coast Gypsies along with Mike Antone & Steve Forsythe, in 2010 and The Mysterious Fatmen 2017 with Hugh Pinkiepie & Jeff Warren. 2022 Kevtone is drumming in a new group with Mike Antone & Rex Olson called “Booker Tom & the Mountaineers Band”

== Discography ==
With Box O'Laffs

- Dogbook (1985)

With Camper Van Beethoven

- Telephone Free Landslide Victory (1985) Cooking Vinyl Records
- Telephone Free Landslide Victory [Bonus Tracks] (1985) Cooking Vinyl Records
- II & III [Bonus Tracks] (1986) Cooking Vinyl Records
- Take The Skinheads Bowling EP (1986) Cooking Vinyl Records
- Hits from the Underground: The 80's (1988) BMG Special Projects
- Camper Vantiquities (1993) IRS Records, (2004) Spin Art
- Camper Vantiquities [Bonus Tracks] (1993) Cooking Vinyl Records, Spin Art
- Camper Van Beethoven Is Dead. Long Live Camper Van Beethoven (2000) Pitch a Tent Records
- Cigarettes & Carrot Juice: The Santa Cruz Years (2002) Spin Art
- Left of the Dial: Dispatches from the '80s Underground (2004) Rhino Records
- Live at the World Café: Volume 20 (2005) WXPN 88.5
- Uncut Presents: John Peel's Festive 15 (2006) Uncut music
- Popular Songs of Great Enduring Strength and Beauty (2008) Cooking Vinyl Records
- Auteur Labels: Independent Project (2010) LTN

With World Entertainment War

- World Entertainment War (1991) MCA Records
- Give Too Much (1991) MCA Records
- K-Mart Tribal Ballet on Komotion International Compilation Raizer X Records

With Calm Down Juanita

- Calm Down Juanita
- Undertown

Other projects

- I Die Every Day
- Since 200 Guess has collaborated on several projects with spoken word artist Christopher Daikos
