= Dennis Herring =

American record producer

Dennis Herring is an American record producer, engineer, mixer, and musician. Herring has produced for The Hives, Elvis Costello, Counting Crows, Modest Mouse, Camper Van Beethoven, and Jars of Clay. He has owned two successful 24-track recording studios: DTLA Recording in Los Angeles and Sweet Tea Recording Studio in Oxford, Mississippi. Herring has won two Grammy awards.

== Selected work ==
- 1986 – American Girls by American Girls
- 1988 – Our Beloved Revolutionary Sweetheart by Camper Van Beethoven
- 1989 – Key Lime Pie by Camper Van Beethoven
- 1991 – The Real Ramona by Throwing Muses
- 1995 – Glow by The Innocence Mission
- 1996 – See the Ocean Blue by The Ocean Blue
- 1996 – The Golden Age by Cracker
- 1999 – This Desert Life by Counting Crows
- 1999 – If I Left the Zoo by Jars of Clay (Note: Won Grammy Award for Best Pop/Contemporary Gospel Album)
- 2001 – Sweet Tea by Buddy Guy
- 2003 – Blues Singer by Buddy Guy
- 2004 – Good News for People Who Love Bad News by Modest Mouse
- 2004 – The Delivery Man by Elvis Costello and The Imposters
- 2005 – End of Fashion by End of Fashion
- 2007 – We Were Dead Before the Ship Even Sank by Modest Mouse
- 2007 – The Black and White Album by The Hives
- 2008 – Way to Normal by Ben Folds
- 2009 – Armistice by Mutemath
- 2010 – King of the Beach by Wavves
- 2010 – Isaac Russell by Isaac Russell
- 2012 – Highlife by This Club
- 2013 – Beta Love by Ra Ra Riot
- 2013 – Cheap Souvenirs by Hey Monea!
- 2013 - "Old Love / New Love" by Twin Shadow
- 2015 – Black Cat by Never Shout Never
- 2017 – Weddings & Funerals by The Kickback
