= Krummenacher =

Krummenacher is a surname. Notable people with the surname include:

- Randy Krummenacher (born 1990), Swiss motorcycle racer
- Victor Krummenacher (born 1965), American bass guitarist and guitarist
