= Key Lime Pie (disambiguation) =

Key lime pie is an American dessert pie and the official state pie of Florida.

Additionally, "Key Lime Pie" or "Key lime pie" stands for:

- Key Lime Pie (band), wrote and recorded the official anthem of the Conch Republic
- Key Lime Pie (album) by Camper Van Beethoven
- Android Key Lime Pie, former codename for Android KitKat
