= Cigarettes & Carrot Juice: The Santa Cruz Years =

Compilation album by Camper Van Beethoven
- Released: 2002
- Genre: Alternative rock
- Length: 226:51
- Label: Cooking Vinyl

Camper Van Beethoven chronology
| Camper Van Beethoven Is Dead. Long Live Camper Van Beethoven | Cigarettes & Carrot Juice: The Santa Cruz Years | In the Mouth of the Crocodile – Live in Seattle |

Professional ratings
Review scores
| Source | Rating |
|---|---|
| Allmusic | link |

Cigarettes & Carrot Juice: The Santa Cruz Years is a five-disc compilation album by American alternative rock group Camper Van Beethoven released in 2002 on the label Cooking Vinyl. It includes the band's first three studio albums (Telephone Free Landslide Victory, II & III, Camper Van Beethoven); the rarities compilation Camper Vantiquities; and a new live CD, Greatest Hits Played Faster, mostly recorded in 1990.
