= Camper Vantiquities =

Compilation album by Camper Van Beethoven
- Released: March 23, 1993
- Length: 68:12
- Label: I.R.S.

Professional ratings
Review scores
Source	Rating
AllMusic	3/5 stars

Camper Vantiquities is a 1993 rarities compilation album by musical group Camper Van Beethoven, released on I.R.S. It included the earlier EP Vampire Can Mating Oven and a number of other unreleased tracks, compiled by bassist Victor Krummenacher a few years after the band split up. The 2004 re-release added several more tracks, all demo versions of songs that appeared on the band's two Virgin Records albums.

== Track listing ==
=== Original 1993 version ===
1. "Heart" (David Lowery) – 3:08
2. "Never Go Back" (Victor Krummenacher, Greg Lisher, Lowery, Chris Pedersen, Jonathan Segel) – 3:24
3. "Seven Languages" (Krummenacher, Lisher, Lowery, Pedersen, Segel) – 4:12
4. "Axe Murderer Song" (Lowery) – 2:28
5. "SP37957" (Krummenacher, Lowery, Jonathan Segel) – 3:04
6. "Crossing Over" (Krummenacher, Lowery, Chris Molla, Segel) – 3:24
7. "Guardian Angels" (Lowery, Molla) – 2:06
8. "I'm Not Like Everybody Else" (Ray Davies) – 3:24
9. "AC Cover" (Krummenacher, Lisher, Lowery, Pedersen, Segel) – 3:01
10. "Porpoise Mouth" (Joe McDonald) – 2:38
11. "(We Workers Do Not Understand) Modern Art" (Krummenacher, Lisher, Lowery, Pedersen, Segel) – 2:58
12. "We Eat Your Children" (Krummenacher, Lisher, Lowery, Pedersen, Segel) – 3:49
13. "Six More Miles to the Graveyard" (Hank Williams) – 2:57
14. "Ice Cream Everyday" (Box O' Laffs, Curkendall, Hart, Lowery, Molla) – 4:04
15. "Processional" (Krummenacher, Lisher, Lowery, Pedersen, Segel) – 3:48
16. "Photograph" (George Harrison, Ringo Starr) – 3:14
17. "Om Eye (Sweet Isthmus)" – 2:06 [hidden track]

=== 2004 CD reissue ===
1. "Heart" – 3:07
2. "Never Go Back" – 3:24
3. "Seven Languages" – 4:12
4. "Axe Murderer Song" – 2:28
5. "SP37957" – 3:04
6. "Crossing Over" – 3:24
7. "Guardian Angels" – 2:06
8. "I'm Not Like Everybody Else" – 3:24
9. "AC Cover" – 3:01
10. "Flowers (Fox Demo)" – 3:03
11. "One of These Days (Fox Demo)" – 3:27
12. "Humid Press of Days (Fox Demo)" – 2:55
13. "All Her Favourite Fruit (Fox Demo)" – 5:14
14. "Silent Monster" – 2:54
15. "Porpoise Mouth" – 2:38
16. "(We Workers Do Not Understand) Modern Art" – 2:58
17. "We Eat Your Children" – 3:49
18. "Six More Miles to the Graveyard" – 2:57
19. "Ice Cream Everyday" – 4:04
20. "Processional" – 3:48
21. "Photograph" – 3:33

== Personnel ==
- Anthony Guess – Drums
- Victor Krummenacher – Bass
- Greg Lisher – Guitar
- David Lowery – Guitar (Rhythm), Vocals
- Chris Molla – Guitar, Mandolin
- Chris Pedersen – Guitar, Violin, Drums, Keyboards, Vocals (background)
- Jonathan Segel – Guitar, Violin, Keyboards, Vocals
