= Camper Van Beethoven (album) =

Studio album by Camper Van Beethoven
- Released: August 1986
- Recorded: May and June 1986
- Genre: Alternative rock, neo-psychedelia
- Length: 44:28 (original); 1:06:16 (1988 reissue); 56:39 (2004 reissue)
- Label: Pitch-A-Tent
- Producer: Self-Produced

Camper Van Beethoven chronology
II & III (1986)	Camper Van Beethoven (1986)	Vampire Can Mating Oven (1987)

Professional ratings
Review scores
Source	Rating
AllMusic	4/5 stars
Blender	4/5 stars
The Rolling Stone Album Guide	3.5/5 stars
Spin Alternative Record Guide	8/10
The Village Voice	A

Camper Van Beethoven is a 1986 album by musical group Camper Van Beethoven, released on Pitch-A-Tent. With the six then CVB members joined in the studio by acid-folk eccentric Eugene Chadbourne, the album is arguably the zenith of the band's musical experimentation, with surreal lyrics, backwards, sped-up and slowed down parts; a portion of the track "Stairway To Heavan" (sic) is itself a musical palindrome, where a recorded piece is played backwards for effect. This can be accomplished by reversing the tape in the studio and manually on some turntables. A great number of ethnic instruments are used in addition to the usual violin parts played by member Jonathan Segel; the album also features pedal steel, banjo, tablas and sitar.

While the album features the band's trademark absurdist lyrics by leader David Lowery and Segel, with CVB staples like affectionate parodies of counterculture and references to drugs and alien abduction, it also features some satirical political lyrics and social commentary on tracks like "Good Guys and Bad Guys", "Joe Stalin's Cadillac" and "We Love You"'.

The songs cover a bewildering range of musical styles: garage punk on "Shut Us Down"', acid-rock jamming on the Pink Floyd cover "Interstellar Overdrive", bluegrass jamming on "Hoe Yourself Down", folk-ska on "Good Guys and Bad Guys", gentle tabla beats on "Une Fois" and "Folly", psychedelic pop on "We Saw Jerry's Daughter", ominous desert-rock spoken word on "Peace and Love" and grinding raga-rock on "Stairway to Heavan" (sic). While earlier CVB albums had featured influences of Eastern European and Mexican musical styles, this album has more noticeable elements of Indian and Arabic musics, done in the usual irreverent Camper style. These combine with the elements of psychedelic music that dominate the album. There are also more elements of Americana than on their previous albums. The American Southwest looms large in the music and lyrics as well, especially on songs like "The History of Utah" and "Peace and Love".

There are a number of classic rock references too: "We Saw Jerry's Daughter" is a parody of Deadheads; "Stairway to Heavan", "Five Sticks" and "Joe Stalin's Cadillac" all contain song titles or lyrics modified from Led Zeppelin; and the cover of "Interstellar Overdrive" and several of the album's songs are reminiscent of Syd Barrett-era Pink Floyd. "We Love You" also contains a parody of the Charlie Daniels Band song "The Devil Went Down to Georgia". In the original "The Devil Went Down to Georgia", the Devil was portrayed as a negative being who is defeated in a fiddle-playing contest by the song's protagonist, but in "We Love You", the devil, presumably Jonathan Segel, so impresses the band with his violin playing that they allow him to become a band member. The classic-rock influences are a contrast from their first two albums, which contained covers of other contemporary underground bands like Sonic Youth and Black Flag.

A number of the album's tracks remain staples of the reunited Camper Van Beethoven's live sets, including "Good Guys and Bad Guys", "The History of Utah", "Interstellar Overdrive" and "Shut Us Down".

In an Oct. 4, 2010, entry on Lowery's "300 Songs" blog, devoted to explaining the genesis and meaning behind the songs he has written throughout his career, the band's leader claimed that this album had a hidden title, concealed in the liner notes and etched onto initial vinyl pressings: "Soviet Spies: Swim Upstream Disguised as Trout." Lowery wrote that this title was inspired by "an obsessive fan that would write us nearly everyday."

The Ziggens' song "I Got Me a Girlfriend" is partially a cover of "Joe Stalin's Cadillac."

== Track listing ==
All tracks by Camper Van Beethoven, except where noted

=== Original 1986 version ===
==== Side one ====
1. "Good Guys and Bad Guys" – 3:54
2. "Joe Stalin's Cadillac" – 2:32
3. "Five Sticks" – 1:37
4. "Lulu Land" (Paul MacKinney) – 2:40
5. "Une Fois" – 1:24
6. "We Saw Jerry's Daughter" – 2:10
7. "Surprise Truck" – 3:27
8. "Stairway to Heavan" – 2:29

==== Side two ====
1. "The History of Utah" – 2:51
2. "Still Wishing to Course" – 3:50
3. "We Love You" – 2:03
4. "Hoe Yourself Down" – 1:49
5. "Peace & Love" – 2:37
6. "Folly" – 1:56
7. "Interstellar Overdrive" (Syd Barrett, Roger Waters, Richard Wright, Nick Mason) – 7:44
8. "Shut Us Down" – 1:25

==== 1988 CD reissue bonus tracks ====
17. "Heart" – 3:08
18. "Never Go Back" – 3:24
19. "Seven Languages" – 4:11
20. "Ice Cream Everyday" – 4:03
21. "Processional" – 3:48
22. "Photograph" – 3:14
- Tracks 17–22 originally released as the Vampire Can Mating Oven EP.

=== 2004 CD reissue ===
1. "Good Guys & Bad Guys" – 3:55
2. "Joe Stalin's Cadillac" – 2:32
3. "Five Sticks" – 1:37
4. "Lulu Land" – 2:55
5. "Une Fois" – 1:28
6. "We Saw Jerry's Daughter" – 2:09
7. "Surprise Truck" – 3:27
8. "Stairway to Heavan" – 2:32
9. "Pope Festival" – 2:46
10. "Love the Witch (Camper Van Beethoven version)" – 2:41
11. "Pictures Of Matchstick Men (Fox Demo)" (Francis Rossi) – 4:26
12. "The History of Utah" – 2:52
13. "Still Wishing to Course" – 3:50
14. "We Love You" – 2:03
15. "Deux Foises" – 1:25
16. "Hoe Yourself Down" – 2:14
17. "Peace & Love" – 2:39
18. "Folly" – 1:57
19. "Interstellar Overdrive" – 7:45
20. "Shut Us Down" – 1:26
- Tracks 9–11 and 15 are bonus tracks.

== Personnel ==
Camper Van Beethoven

- Victor Krummenacher – bass guitar, backing vocals, spoken word
- David Lowery – lead and backing vocals, rhythm guitar
- Greg Lisher – lead guitar, backing vocals
- Chris Molla – pedal steel guitar, guitar, accordion, lead and backing vocals
- Chris Pedersen – drums
- Jonathan Segel – violin, guitar, keyboards, mandolin, sitar, lead and backing vocals
- Eugene Chadbourne – guitar, banjo

Technical

- Tom Fox – engineer

== Charts ==
Chart (1986)	Peak position
UK Indie Chart	7
