= Monks of Doom =

American alternative rock band

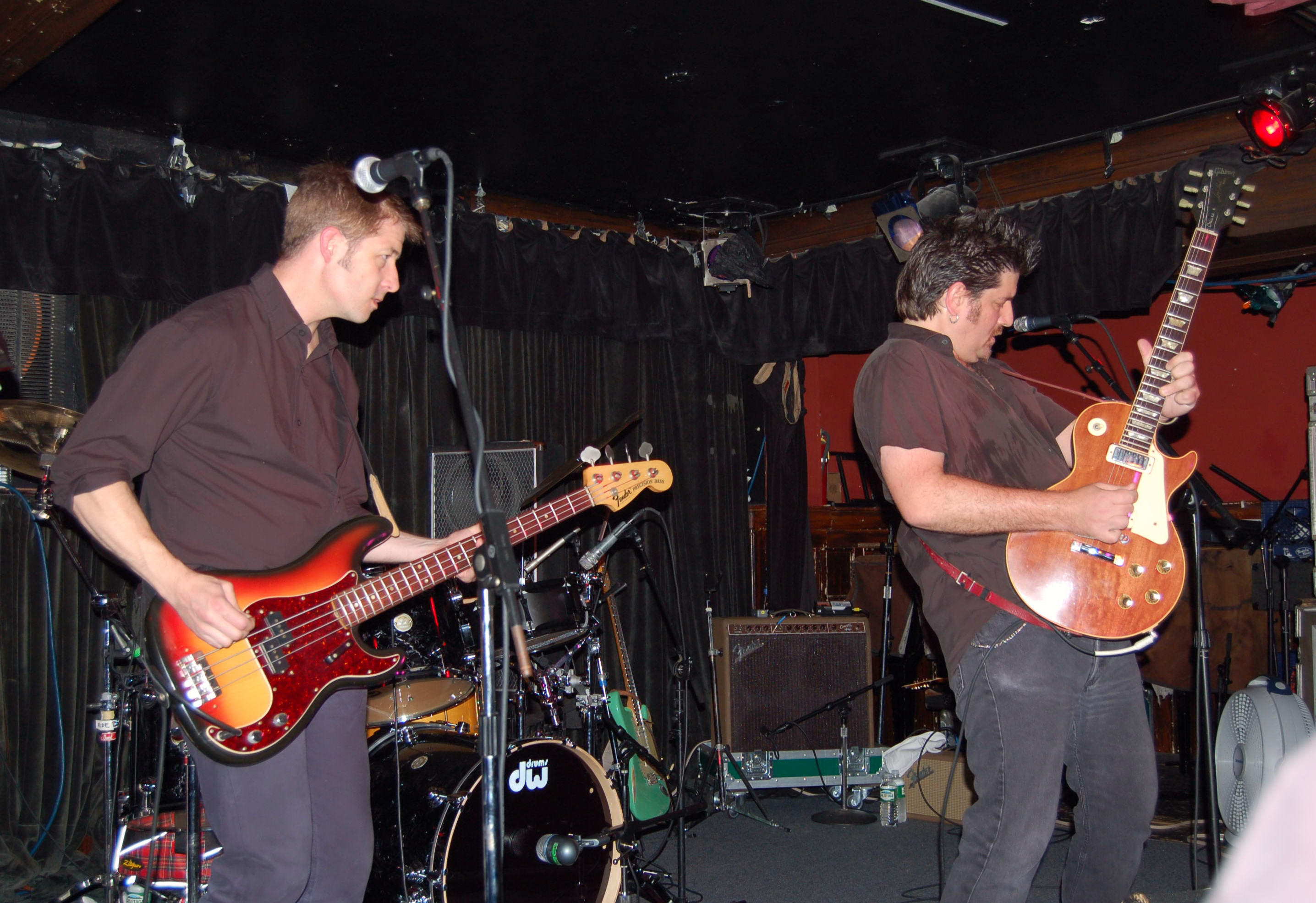
- The band performing in 2005 Photo: Steve Rhodes

Background information
- Origin: San Francisco, California, United States
- Genres: Alternative rock
- Years active: 1986–1993, 1998, 2003–present
- Labels: I.R.S. Records, Magnetic Motorworks, Pitch-A-Tent Records, C/Z Records, Rough Trade Records
- Members: Victor Krummenacher; Greg Lisher; Chris Pedersen; David Immerglück
- Past members: Chris Molla

The Monks of Doom is an American alternative rock band, formed in California in 1986. The band's music draws from post-punk, progressive rock, indie rock, psychedelic and folk rock traditions. The group is a side project of the band Camper Van Beethoven, with whom all Monks of Doom members have been involved.

== History and background ==
=== Formation, first two albums (1986–1990) ===
In 1986, the band began as an offshoot of Camper Van Beethoven, who were enjoying increasing critical and commercial success. Guitarists Greg Lisher and Chris Molla, bassist (and in the case of the Monks of Doom, lead vocalist) Victor Krummenacher and drummer Chris Pedersen began the group as a casual side project to explore some of their interests that did not fit into Camper Van Beethoven's sound. Molla left both groups shortly thereafter, and Bay Area guitarist David Immerglück, then of the group The Ophelias, replaced him in the Monks of Doom. Immerglück shared lead vocal duties with Krummenacher.

Their debut album, 1986's Soundtrack to the Film Breakfast on the Beach of Deception, was mostly an in-studio experiment. No film exists for which it is a soundtrack. Their next record, 1989's The Cosmodemonic Telegraph Company, was less experimental and more vocally-oriented than the band's first record and live shows. Immerglück joined Camper Van Beethoven as a guitarist and pedal steel guitarist shortly before their breakup in 1990.

=== Increased activity, breakup (1990–1993, 1998) ===
Following this split, the Monks of Doom increased their activity. Through the next three years, they released two full-length albums (1991's Meridian and 1992's Forgery) and one EP (1992's The Insect God) on three different labels, and toured extensively. I.R.S. Records released Forgery, the final in this string of releases, and took over much of the band's back catalog.

In 1993, Immerglück left the band to focus on his work as a studio session player and producer, where he would go on to play extensively with John Hiatt and later join the successful modern rock group Counting Crows as a full-time member. The remaining members disbanded the group immediately thereafter. Krummenacher and Lisher went on to perform and record solo material and play with various other groups. The Monks of Doom were inactive for the next five years.

Pedersen's decision to move to Australia in 1998 led the group to play a well-received "final" concert. The following year, Krummenacher and Lisher (along with Immerglück and Pedersen sporadically) once again began working with former Camper Van Beethoven members David Lowery and Jonathan Segel in various capacities, eventually resulting in an official reformation.

=== Reformation (2003–present) ===
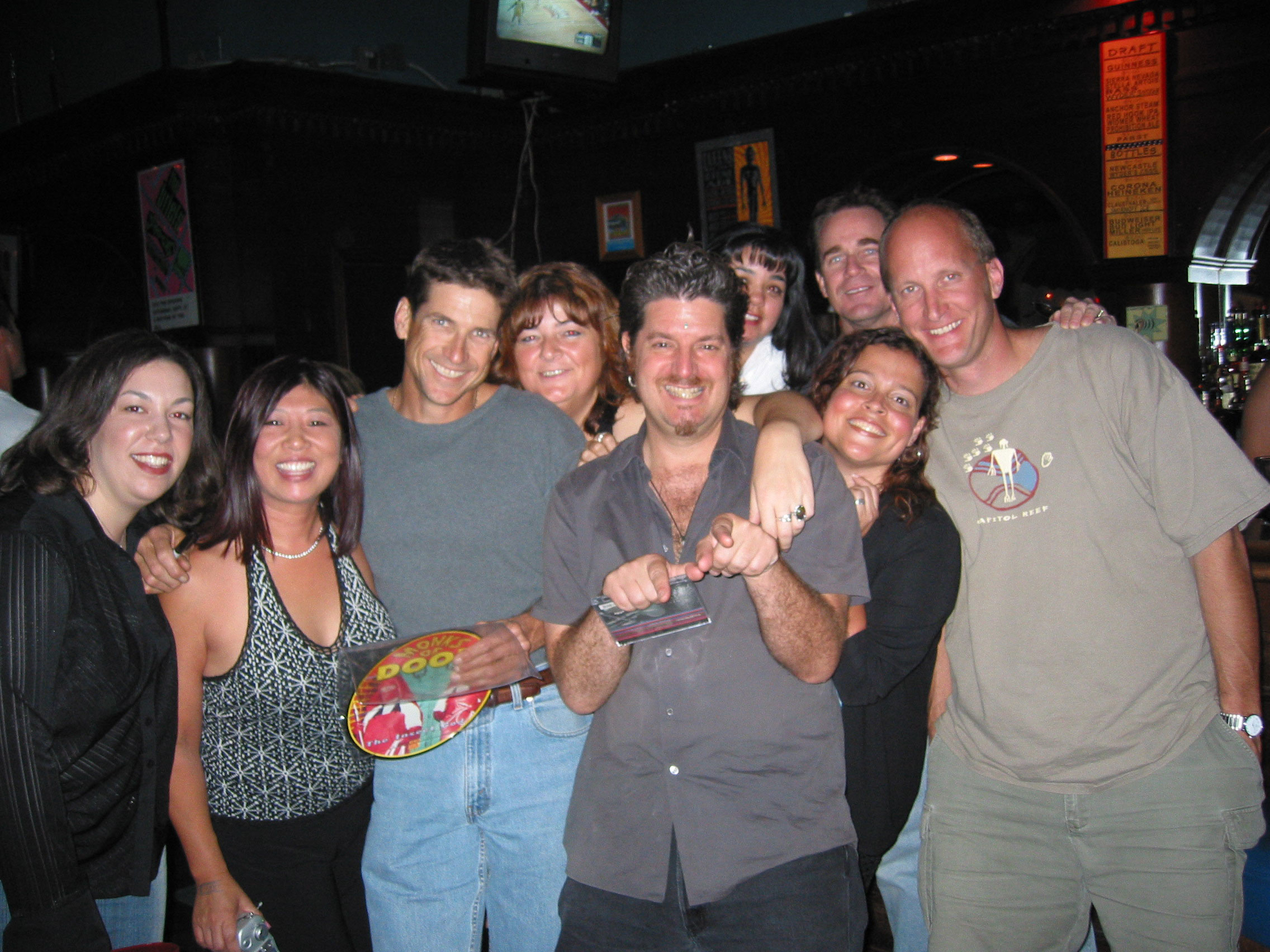
David Immergluck with fans and a limited edition vinyl copy of The Insect God E.P.

In 2003, the Monks of Doom also reformed, flying Pedersen in for occasional concerts and studio work. In 2006, they released What's Left For Kicks?, an album of cover songs from artists such as Neu!, the Kinks, Rahsaan Roland Kirk, Nino Rota, Wire, Quicksilver Messenger Service, Steve Hillage, and Roy Harper, many of which had previously featured in the band's live set. On previous releases, the band had recorded cover versions of songs by Snakefinger, Eugene Chadbourne, Syd Barrett and Frank Zappa.

In 2005, the band performed at the Cracker / Camper Van Beethoven Annual Campout in Pioneertown, California, and another show in Hollywood. The group later played two concerts in Brooklyn, New York, in March 2009, as well as shows at that year's Cracker/Camper Van Beethoven Campout and Cafe Du Nord in San Francisco. They recorded The Brontë Pin, their first new album of original material in 24 years, in 2017, with a 2018 release and shows to follow.

== Members ==
Current members

- Victor Krummenacher – lead and backing vocals, bass guitar, acoustic guitar, electric guitar, keyboards (1986–1993, 1998, 2003–present)
- Greg Lisher – electric and acoustic guitars, backing vocals (1986–1993, 1998, 2003–present)
- Chris Pedersen – drums, percussion, objects (1986–1993, 1998, 2003–present)
- David Immerglück – lead and backing vocals, electric and acoustic guitars, pedal steel guitar, mandolin, keyboards, bass guitar, harmonica (1986–1993, 1998, 2003–present)

Former members

- Chris Molla – guitar, keyboards, backing vocals (1986)

== Releases ==
- Soundtrack to the Film 'Breakfast on the Beach of Deception' (1987, Pitch-A-Tent Records)
- The Cosmodemonic Telegraph Company (1989, Pitch-A-Tent Records)
- Meridian (1991, Baited Breath)
- The Insect God E.P. (1992, C/Z Records)
- Forgery (1992, I.R.S. Records)
- What's Left For Kicks? (2006, Magnetic Motorworks/Pitch-A-Tent Records)
- The Brontë Pin (2018, Veritas/Pitch-A-Tent Records)
