= New Roman Times =

Studio album by Camper Van Beethoven
- Released: October 12, 2004
- Genre: Alternative rock
- Length: 67:22
- Label: Pitch-a-Tent/Vanguard
- Producer: Camper Van Beethoven

Camper Van Beethoven chronology
Tusk (2002)	New Roman Times (2004)	Discotheque CVB: Live in Chicago (2005)

Professional ratings
Review scores
Source	Rating
Allmusic	link
Blender	link

New Roman Times is an album by musical group Camper Van Beethoven, released October 12, 2004, on Pitch-A-Tent Records. It was the band's first studio album of new material since they released Key Lime Pie in 1989 before dissolving in 1990.

== Background and recording ==
The core lineup on the album consists of David Lowery, Jonathan Segel, Victor Krummenacher, Greg Lisher, Chris Pedersen and David Immerglück, all of whom played in earlier lineups of the band. With former Camper member Chris Molla participating on a few songs as well, the album features many contributions from those involved in the band's late-1980s heyday. The album also features some songwriting and musical contributions by Johnny Hickman, the guitarist in Lowery's band Cracker, who was also a member of the Estonian Gauchos, an early-1980s precursor to CVB that had also featured Lowery and Molla. Cracker drummer Frank Funaro and accordionist/keyboardist Kenny Margolis, both of whom were featured in Camper's live shows prior to the album's release, are listed in the credits as "live band blood and guts."

The album is set in a surreal, alternative universe in which the United States is split up into separate, hostile countries. Texas is a right-wing, Christian country, while California is a left-wing utopian state, although in the story it is engulfed by civil war and occupied by right-wing security forces. This is a cryptic commentary on the red state/blue state political division that exists in the US.

The main character is a Texan around the age of 20 who enlists in the army after an event similar to 9/11 occurs. In the beginning of the story, he is very nationalistic and gung-ho about defending his country. He fights in the war and is wounded, losing a leg. He returns disabled and disillusioned with the fight. After an uprising in California, he joins the right-wing security force called "The Texas Bureau" that maintains peace there. After being disillusioned with that work as well, he joins the "rebels," who are portrayed as kind of hippie/skater/surfer eco-warriors who are allied with Mexico and with space aliens. At the end of the album, he prepares to be a suicide bomber, presumably for his new cause, although the album's deliberately obscure storytelling style makes the ending unclear. The album features other characters as well, including space aliens, right-wing militia members, a retired intelligence officer, and mentally disturbed homeless people.

The title, in addition to commenting on the theme of the album, is a play on the typeface Times New Roman. One of the songs, "That Gum You Like Is Back In Style" is derived from a line in David Lynch's cult TV show Twin Peaks. Another, "Come Out", is a cover of a piece by minimalist composer Steve Reich.

== Novel ==
In 2018 a novel based on the album was released, called New Roman Times, authored by Evan Brown. Lowery and Segel had the following to say about the story:

"How did it come to all this anyway? It’s been a very confusing time, hasn’t it? Well, here’s one of the many complicated stories that should bring some understanding of the real players involved, to bring you up to speed on the events of today. So much of it rides on the tales of these characters.”

-Jonathan Segel

"New Roman Times was intended as a kind of commentary on the fakish red/blue narrative that emerged in the media in the lead up to the Iraq war. The crazy conspiratorial elements were thrown in because it’s a Camper Van Beethoven album. The fact our 2003 unreality better matches 2018’s reality should bother us all."

- David Lowery

== Track listing ==
1. "Prelude" – 0:55 – A catastrophic attack occurs
2. "Sons of the New Golden West" – 2:55 – A secretive cabal implements their plan
3. "51/7" – 4:44 – A young Texan volunteers for an elite military unit
4. "White Fluffy Clouds" – 5:01 – Soldiers sing the praises of their weapons
5. "That Gum You Like Is Back in Style" – 4:56 – A retired intelligence officer contemplates cryptic transmissions
6. "Might Makes Right" – 2:46 – The young soldier begins to have doubts
7. "Militia Song" – 2:10 – Meanwhile civil unrest and right-wing violence in the Republic of California
8. "R 'N' R Uzbekistan" – 1:13 – Rest and relaxation in the Czarist republic
9. "Sons of the New Golden West Reprise" – 0:21 – A coup d'etat in California
10. "New Roman Times" – 4:47 – The young soldier returns to Texas disillusioned and minus a foot
11. "The Poppies of Balmorhea" – 3:23 – At a West Texas oasis the ex-soldier is introduced to a narcotic flower
12. "Long Plastic Hallway" – 5:09 – The ex-soldier goes to occupied California, is wined, dined and recruited by TexSecurIntellicorp
13. "I Am Talking to This Flower" – 2:30 – The ex-soldier doesn't like his new job, but enjoys hanging out with drug dealers and arms traffickers
14. "Come Out" – 1:44 – famous minimalist composer has a pop hit inspired by the anti-fascist riots in Watts, California
15. "Los Tigres Traficantes" – 2:30 – The traffickers sell their stuff
16. "I Hate This Part of Texas" – 2:45 – (in broken Spanish) The ex-soldier attempts to contact members of the CVB resistance group
17. "Hippy Chix" – 4:27 – The ex-soldier takes the oath and joins the CVB
18. "Civil Disobedience" – 6:25 – Seemingly disturbed homeless man harangues retired intelligence officer
19. "Discotheque CVB" – 5:48 – At a party on the northern coast of California, the ex-soldier has a vision
20. "Hey Brother" – 2:46 – A suicide bomber prepares for his mission
