= La Costa Perdida =

Studio album by Camper Van Beethoven
- Released: January 22, 2013
- Genre: Alternative rock
- Length: 43:04
- Label: 429 Records

Camper Van Beethoven chronology
New Roman Times (2004)	La Costa Perdida (2013)	El Camino Real (2014)

Professional ratings
Review scores
Source	Rating
Allmusic	3/5 stars

La Costa Perdida is the 8th studio release by the American alternative-music band Camper Van Beethoven. It was released on January 22, 2013, and contains 10 tracks. The lead-off single from the album, "Northern California Girls", was released on January 1, 2013. This album focuses on Northern California in its lyrics and artwork and is paired with the following year's release El Camino Real, another concept album about Southern California.

== Production ==
According to the band, the album was influenced by their California roots, as well as the album Holland by the Beach Boys. The album features the four core CVB members: David Lowery on rhythm guitar and lead vocals, Jonathan Segel on violin, guitar, mandolin, keyboards and backing vocals, Victor Krummenacher on bass and baritone guitar, and Greg Lisher on lead guitar. Most of the drumming on the album is handled by studio drummer Michael Urbano, a former member of Lowery's other band Cracker, although former CVB drummer Chris Pedersen also plays drums on "Too High For the Love-In" and the title track. The band's then-regular live drummer Frank Funaro, also a member of Cracker, does not appear on the album, although he is pictured in a band photograph.

"La Costa Perdida" is Spanish for "The Lost Coast," which Lowery uses as a metonym for the bulk of California's North Coast, between Stinson Beach and Arcata.

== Track listing ==
1. "Come Down the Coast"
2. "Too High for the Love-In"
3. "You've Got to Roll"
4. "Someday Our Love Will Sell Us Out"
5. "Peaches in the Summertime"
6. "Northern California Girls"
7. "Summer Days"
8. "La Costa Perdida"
9. "Aged in Wood"
10. "A Love for All Time"
