= Spot 1019 =

Spot 1019 was a rock combo that started in the early 1980's in Santa Cruz, California with vocalist Joe Sloan and bassist Jimb Lyons who first played together in a 1979 campus combo called the Tokyo Negroes. After leaving college, Spot 1019 moved north to San Francisco in the late 1980's. Joe Sloan's imaginative and fantastically silly lyrical themes included UFOs, bacon, psychedelic drug references, and imaginary rock festivals populated with characters from 1960s pop culture such as Cesar Romero and Buddy Hackett.

The four-piece band specialized in humorous rock tinged with country western, blues, pop and punk influences, beginning their career in earnest with a self titled full length LP on Camper Van Beethoven's vanity imprint label Pitch-A-Tent released in 1986. In 1990, they were signed by Lisa Fancher of Frontier Records, which re-released their debut, and 2 other albums by the band, that despite some college radio airplay and regular touring, never achieved widespread popularity.

Later on, the band started their own label, Donut Pole Records, which put out additional material on CD. Spot 1019 wound down by the late 1990's and occasionally reunited, playing their last show in June 2012 at the Bottom Of The Hill club in San Francisco. Any future possibility of the band reuniting was put to rest in 2021 when vocalist Joe Sloan died in Portland Oregon. A memorial was held for Sloan at the Bottom of the Hill club in 2022 in which two of the surviving members performed sans drummer Greg Winter who had moved to Chicago.

David Dondero proclaims his affection for the band in the song "Michael Raines" on the album Live at the Hemlock.

== Members ==
Peter Tripodi, Guitars (large and small)
Jimb Lyons, Bass
Greg Winter, Drums
Joe Sloan, Vocals

== Discography ==
- SPOT1019 (Pitch-a-tent records, 1986; re-released on Frontier Records, 1990)
- This World Owes Me a Buzz (Pitch-a-tent records, 1988; re-released on Frontier Records, 1991)
- Still...Again (Frontier Records, 1990)
- "Nickel Bag of Donuts"/"A Clown of Thorns" (Self-released, 1992)
- "In Her Satanic Majesty's Secret Service Entrance" (Self-released, 2002)
