= Our Beloved Revolutionary Sweetheart =

Studio album by Camper Van Beethoven
- Released: May 24, 1988
- Recorded: Summer/Fall 1987
- Genre: Alternative rock
- Length: 41:53
- Label: Virgin
- Producer: Dennis Herring

Camper Van Beethoven chronology
Vampire Can Mating Oven (1987)	Our Beloved Revolutionary Sweetheart (1988)	Key Lime Pie (1989)

Singles from Our Beloved Revolutionary Sweetheart
- 1. "Turquoise Jewelry" Released: 1988; 2. "Life Is Grand" Released: 1988

Professional ratings
Review scores
Source	Rating
AllMusic	4/5 stars
NME	5/10
The Philadelphia Inquirer	4/4 stars
PopMatters	8/10
Rolling Stone	4/5 stars
The Rolling Stone Album Guide	4.5/5 stars
Spin Alternative Record Guide	8/10
The Village Voice	B+

Our Beloved Revolutionary Sweetheart is a 1988 album by Camper Van Beethoven, released on Virgin Records. It was the band's first major-label album, and was produced by Dennis Herring, the first time the band had used an outside producer. The album cover art, designed by Bruce Licher, was nominated for a Grammy Award in 1989.

The lineup on the album included David Lowery on lead vocals and rhythm guitar, Jonathan Segel on violin, mandolin, keyboards, guitar and backing vocals, Victor Krummenacher on bass and backing vocals, Greg Lisher on lead guitar, and Chris Pedersen on drums. It was the first Camper Van Beethoven album not to feature founding guitarist/drummer/multi-instrumentalist Chris Molla.

The album featured the band's trademark eclectic mix of music, including folk, ska, Eastern European music, Americana, psychedelic rock, and Middle-Eastern music. Despite this, it has a considerably slicker and more mainstream sound than the band's previous, more garage-rock-oriented albums, largely due to Herring's production. The reunited Camper Van Beethoven features a number of tracks from the album in its setlists, including most of the first side, as well as "Waka", "Tania", and "Life Is Grand" from the second side.

Lowery described the inclusion of the folk song "O Death" as a tribute to the American 1960s psychedelic band Kaleidoscope, who included their version of the song on their album Side Trips.

== Track listing ==
All tracks are written by Camper Van Beethoven (David Lowery, Jonathan Segel, Greg Lisher, Victor Krummenacher, Chris Pedersen), except as noted.

Side One
No.	Title	Writer(s)	Length
1.	"Eye of Fatima (Part One)"		2:37
2.	"Eye of Fatima (Part Two)"		2:17
3.	"O Death"	Traditional, arranged by Camper Van Beethoven	3:07
4.	"She Divines Water"		3:52
5.	"Devil Song"		1:59
6.	"One of These Days"		3:27
7.	"Turquoise Jewelry"		3:07

Side Two
No.	Title	Length
8.	"Waka"	2:46
9.	"Change Your Mind"	3:03
10.	"My Path Belated"	2:35
11.	"Never Go Back"	3:25
12.	"The Fool"	2:37
13.	"Tania"	3:48
14.	"Life Is Grand"	3:23
Total length:		41:53

Bonus Tracks, 2014 Omnivore Reissue
No.	Title	Writer(s)	Length
15.	"Love Is a Weed"		2:04
16.	"Harmony in My Head" (covering Buzzcocks (1979))	Steve Diggle	2:46
17.	"Wade in the Water" (covering Herb Alpert version (1967))	Herb Alpert, Bob Edmonson, John Pisano	1:23
18.	"Eye of Fatima Pts. 1 & 2" (Edit)		3:27
19.	"The Day That Lassie Went to the Moon" (Live) (Recorded Oct 1988, Toads, New Haven, CT)	Lowery, David McDaniel	3:04
20.	"One of These Days" (Live)		3:25
21.	"Smash It Up" (Live) (covering the Damned (1979))	Rat Scabies, Captain Sensible, Dave Vanian, Alasdair Ward	3:20
22.	"Seven Languages" (Live)	Lowery, Krummenacher, Lisher, Pedersen, Segel	4:16
23.	"Kodachrome" (Live) (covering Paul Simon (1973))	Paul Simon	3:03
24.	"Hanging Around" (Live) (covering the Stranglers (1977))	Hugh Cornwell, Dave Greenfield, Jean-Jacques Burnel, Jet Black	3:42
25.	"Pope Festival"		3:00
Total length:			75:18

On the reissue, tracks 15–17 are from the "Life Is Grand" single, track 18 is from the "Eye of Fatima"/"Turquoise Jewelry" promo single, and track 25 is from the 1987 compilation At Dianne's Place. Tracks 20–24 were recorded on October 14, 1988, at UMass Amherst, Amherst, MA; they and track 19 were previously unreleased.

== Charts ==
Album - Billboard (United States)

Year	Chart	Position
1988	The Billboard 200	124
