= Key Lime Pie (album) =

Studio album by Camper Van Beethoven
- Released: September 5, 1989
- Recorded: February–July 1989
- Studio: Capitol Studios (Hollywood, Los Angeles, California)
- Genres: Alternative rock, alternative country, neo-psychedelia
- Length: 50:05
- Label: Virgin
- Producer: Dennis Herring

Camper Van Beethoven chronology
Our Beloved Revolutionary Sweetheart (1988)	Key Lime Pie (1989)	Tusk (2003)

Professional ratings
Review scores
Source	Rating
AllMusic	4/5 stars
NME	8/10
Q	4/5 stars
The Rolling Stone Album Guide	4/5 stars
Spin Alternative Record Guide	8/10
The Village Voice	B+

Key Lime Pie is a 1989 album by Camper Van Beethoven (CVB). It was the band's final album before breaking up in 1990, although the band has reunited and released new material in recent years. It was produced by Dennis Herring, who had also produced the band's previous album, Our Beloved Revolutionary Sweetheart.

== Description ==
Key Lime Pie was the only Camper Van Beethoven album not to feature founding violinist/multi-instrumentalist/vocalist Jonathan Segel, who left the band before the album was recorded. The band's core lineup on the album consisted of vocalist/rhythm guitarist/frontman David Lowery, bassist Victor Krummenacher, lead guitarist Greg Lisher and drummer Chris Pedersen. Most of the violin parts were played by Don Lax, who was hired only for recording sessions and was not a band member. Near the end of the recording of the album, violinist Morgan Fichter was hired as the replacement for Segel. Fichter played only on the tracks "Opening Theme", "Pictures of Matchstick Men" and "Flowers," although she sings harmony vocals on a few other tracks and appears on the record's cover. On the tour for the album, the band was also joined by steel guitarist/mandolinist/guitarist David Immerglück, a member of CVB's side project Monks of Doom.

Lowery has been quoted in interviews as saying that, although the entire band (save for Fichter) played on the basic tracks, Greg Lisher was the only other member to have contributed significantly to the album's recording, with most of the overdubbing and studio polishing having been done by Lowery, Lisher and producer Dennis Herring. Lisher's distinctive psychedelic lead guitar playing is arguably the album's most distinctive instrumental feature, although the band's use of violin also has a great influence on the sound of the record.

The album featured a darker lyrical outlook as compared to the band's previous record, although there is still a great deal of the band's trademark humor. It was also the most political record that CVB had released, with tracks like "When I Win the Lottery," "Sweethearts" and "Jack Ruby" providing some humorous political and social commentary. Lowery said in an interview that "All Her Favorite Fruit" was based on the romance between Jessica Swanlake and Roger Mexico from the Thomas Pynchon novel Gravity's Rainbow.

It also featured less of the band's world music influence, although there are still elements of CVB favorites like ska and Eastern European music in songs like "Opening Theme" and "Borderline." In place of the world-music influence, there are even more elements of Americana evident in many of the songs. Psychedelia, another staple of the band's eclectic sound, is also very much in evidence, although songs like "The Light from a Cake" and "Flowers" feature a more-orchestrated, less-dissonant version of psychedelic music than did the band's earlier albums.

The album was CVB's most commercially successful record, with the Status Quo cover "Pictures of Matchstick Men" becoming an alternative rock hit and peaking at number one on the Billboard Alternative Songs chart.

== Track listing ==
All songs written by Krummenacher/Lisher/Lowery/Pedersen, except where noted.

1. "Opening Theme" – 2:21
2. "Jack Ruby" – 5:22
3. "Sweethearts" – 4:45
4. "When I Win the Lottery" – 3:38
5. "(I Was Born in a) Laundromat" – 3:43
6. "Borderline" – 3:48
7. "The Light from a Cake" – 2:43
8. "June" – 4:24
9. "All Her Favorite Fruit" – 5:14
10. "Interlude" – 1:03
11. "Flowers" (Lowery, Eric Curkendall, Chris Hart) – 2:58
12. "The Humid Press of Days" – 2:44
13. "Pictures of Matchstick Men" (Francis Rossi) – 4:08
14. "Come on Darkness" – 3:14

=== 2014 Omnivore Reissue ===
1. "Opening Theme" – 2:21
2. "Jack Ruby" – 5:22
3. "Sweethearts" – 4:45
4. "When I Win the Lottery" – 3:38
5. "(I Was Born in a) Laundromat" – 3:43
6. "Borderline" – 3:48
7. "The Light from a Cake" – 2:43
8. "June" – 4:24
9. "All Her Favorite Fruit" – 5:14
10. "Interlude" – 1:03
11. "Flowers" – 2:58
12. "The Humid Press of Days" – 2:44
13. "Pictures of Matchstick Men" (Rossi) – 4:08
14. "Come on Darkness" – 3:14
15. "Closing Theme (aka Guitar Hero)" - 2:27
16. "(I Was Born in a) Laundromat" (Edit) - 3:05
17. "Country 2" (Demo) - 2:42
18. "Good Guys & Bad Guys" (Live) - 4:18
19. "Wasted" (Live) (Ginn/Morris) - 1:35
20. "Take the Skinheads Bowling" (Live) - 2:23
21. "Before I Met You" (Live) (Seitz/Rader/Lewis) - 3:09
22. "L'Aguardiente" (Soho Natural Session) - 4:59
23. "(I Don't Want to Go to the) Lincoln Shrine" (Soho Natural Session) - 3:00

== Personnel ==
- Tim Cook - pedal steel
- Davey Faragher - backing vocals
- Morgan Fichter - violin, vocals
- Garth Hudson - organ, talking
- Victor Krummenacher - bass, vocals
- Don Lax - fiddle, strings
- Greg Lisher - guitar, vocals
- David Lowery - guitar, harmonica, keyboards, vocals
- Mary O'Neil - backing vocals
- Chris Pedersen - percussion, drums, vocals
- Hammer Smith - harmonica
- Wally Sound - backing vocals

Technical

- Dennis Herring - producer, engineer
- Csaba Petocz - engineer, mixing
- Charles Paakkari - engineer, second engineer
- Peter Doell - second engineer
- Shawna Stobie, Vince Zermeno, Mark Herman - mixing
- Howie Weinberg - mastering
- Bruce Licher - design
- Greg Allen, Andre Lansel - photography

== Charts ==
Album - Billboard (United States)

Year	Chart	Position
1989	The Billboard 200	141

Singles - Billboard (United States)

Year	Single	Chart	Position
1989	"Pictures of Matchstick Men"	Modern Rock Tracks	1
