= Victor Krummenacher =

American singer-songwriter

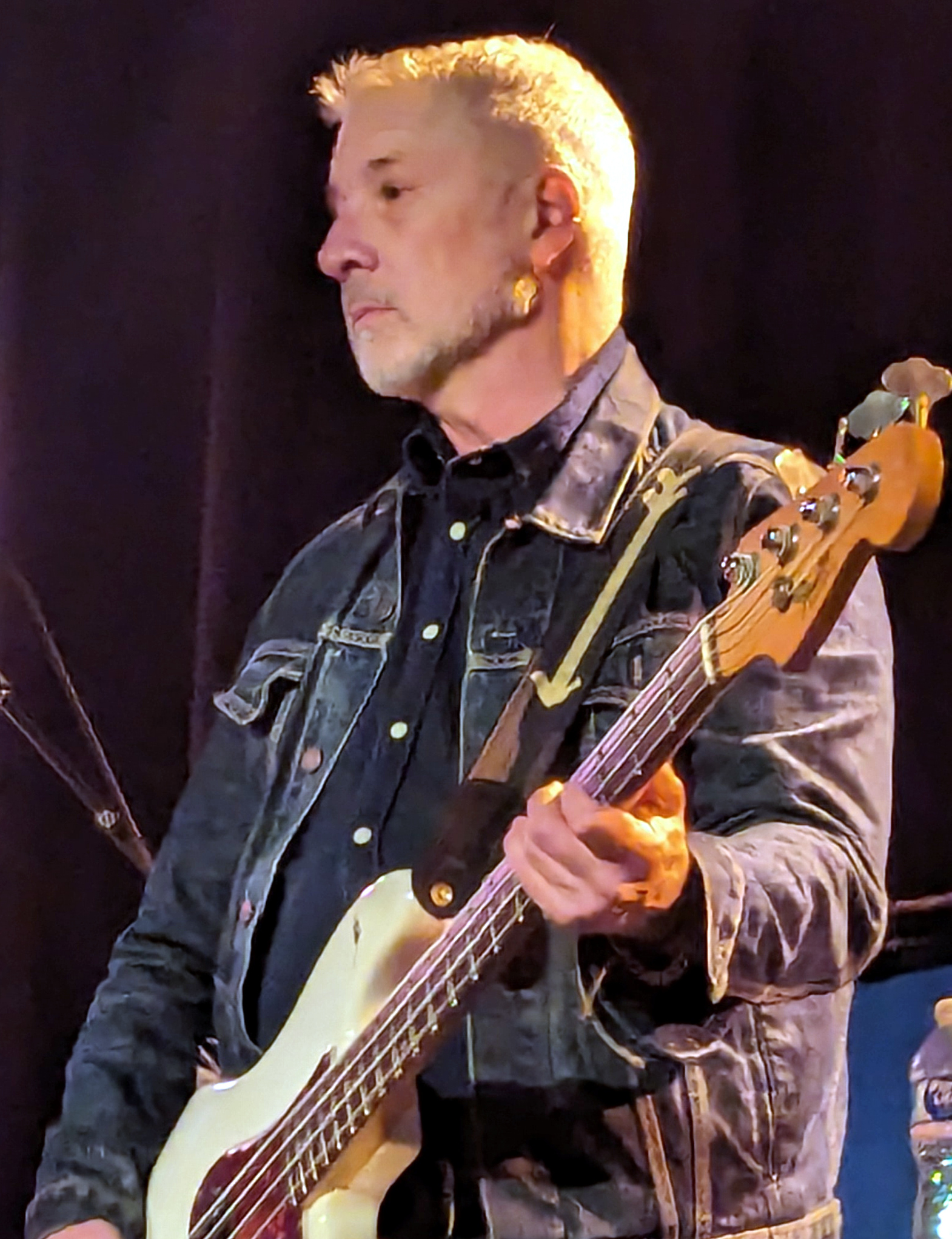
- Krummenacher performing in 2024

Background information
- Born: Victor Krummenacher; April 7, 1965 (age 61); Riverside, California, US
- Genres: Rock, Southern rock, blues, world music
- Occupations: Musician, graphic designer
- Instrument: Bass
- Years active: 1984–present
- Labels: Columbia; Legacy Recordings
- Website: Official website

Victor Krummenacher (born April 7, 1965) is an American bass guitarist and guitarist. He is a founding member of alternative rock band Camper Van Beethoven.

== Career ==
In addition to co-founding Camper Van Beethoven, Krummenacher is also a co-founder of CVB offshoot Monks of Doom, and The Third Mind (with Dave Alvin, David Immerglück, Michael Jerome and Jesse Sykes). He has also worked as a member of the Portland based band Eyelids, Two Heads (with John Moremen, Willie Aron and DJ Bonebrake of X), and Camper Van Chadbourne.

As a recording artist, Krummenacher has been active for more than 30 years and has appeared live and in the studio with numerous projects including Cracker, M. Ward, The Illustrious Ancestors (with John Kruth), Pat Thomas' Mushroom and McCabe and Mrs. Miller, a duo formed in 2008 with Alison Faith Levy of The Loud Family.

Krummenacher has pursued a solo career as a singer-songwriter since 1994. His tenth solo album excluding compilations is, Silver Smoke of Dreams, released on October 15, 2021. As of 2021, Krummenacher resides in Portland, Oregon.

In addition to his musical career, Krummenacher was previously art director of the San Francisco Bay Guardian, a managing art director for Wired and is currently a freelance art director for print, digital and video.

== Discography ==
=== Solo albums ===
- Out in the Heat (1995)
- Saint John's Mercy (1998)
- Bittersweet (2000)
- Nocturne (2003)
- Sans Soleil (2003)
- The Cock Crows at Sunrise (2007)
- Patriarch's Blues (2008)
- I Was a Nightmare, But I'm Not Going to Go There (2012)
- Hard to See Trouble Coming (2015)
- Blue Pacific (2018)
- Silver Smoke of Dreams (2021)

=== with Camper Van Beethoven ===
==== Albums ====
- Telephone Free Landslide Victory (1985)
- II & III (1986)
- Camper Van Beethoven (1986)
- Vampire Can Mating Oven (1987)
- Our Beloved Revolutionary Sweetheart (1988)
- Key Lime Pie (1989)
- Tusk (2002)
- New Roman Times (2004)
- La Costa Perdida (2013)
- El Camino Real (2014)

==== Compilations and special releases ====
- The Virgin Years (1993) (Camper Van Beethoven and Cracker)
- Camper Vantiquities (1993) – rarities compilation
- Camper Van Beethoven Is Dead. Long Live Camper Van Beethoven (2000) – rarities compilation
- Cigarettes & Carrot Juice: The Santa Cruz Years (2002) – box set
- In the Mouth of the Crocodile - Live in Seattle (2004)
- Discotheque CVB: Live In Chicago (2005)

=== with Monks of Doom ===
- Soundtrack to the Film "Breakfast on the Beach of Deception" (1987)
- The Cosmodemonic Telegraph Company (1989)
- Meridian (1991)
- The Insect God (EP, 1992)
- Forgery (1993)
- What's Left For Kicks? (2004)
- The Brönte Pin (2017)

=== with Eugene Chadbourne ===
- Camper Van Chadbourne (1987)
- Eddie Chatterbox Double Trio Love Album (1988)
- Eugene Van Beethoven's 69th Sin-Funny (1991)
- Used Record Pile (1999)
- Revenge of Camper Van Chadbourne (1999)
- PsyCHADelidoowop (2001)

=== Other recordings and projects ===
- The Wrestling Worms – The Wrestling Worms (1987)
- Jonathan Segel – Storytelling (1989)
- Fifth Business – "Prince of Lies" b/w "Hey Robert" (single, 1994)
- Dent – Stimmung (1995)
- The Electric Chairmen – Toast (1996)
- Dent – Verstärker (1998)
- Greg Lisher – Handed Down the Wire (1999)
- Magnet – Caffeine Superstar (1999)
- Robi Del Mar – Alone in the Belly (2000)
- Jonathan Segel – Edgy Not Antsy (2003)
- Jonathan Segel – Honey (2007)
- McCabe & Mrs. Miller – Time For Leaving (2009)
- Incidental music for the Bob Dylan film Masked and Anonymous (with Bruce Kaphan)
- The Third Mind (self titled), Yep Roc 2020.
- Two Heads (forthcoming)
- Eyelids (forthcoming)
