= Greg Lisher =

American musician

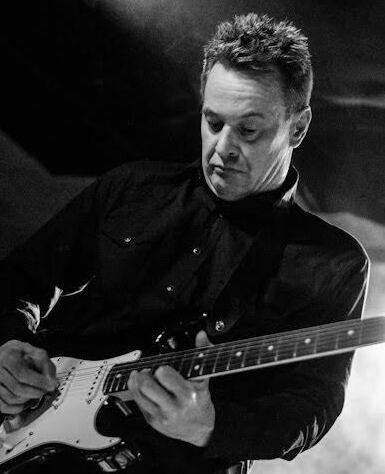
- Lisher performing in 2024

Background information
- Born: Gregory Allen Lisher; November 29, 1963 (age 62); San Francisco, California. U.S.
- Genres: Rock, Electronic, Alternative, Progressive
- Occupation: Musician
- Instruments: Guitar, Keyboard, Mandolin, Bass
- Years active: 1985–present
- Labels: Rough Trade, Virgin, IRS
- Website: Greg Lisher Official Website

Gregory Allen Lisher (born November 29, 1963) is the lead guitar player for Camper Van Beethoven. He is also one of the founding members of the Camper Van Beethoven spin-off indie progressive rock group Monks of Doom.

Lisher has also released four solo records. His first solo record, Handed Down the Wire, was released in 2001 followed by Trains Change in 2007 and Songs From the Imperial Garden in 2020. His latest release, Underwater Detection Method, was released on Independent Project Records in 2024.

== Discography ==
=== with Camper Van Beethoven ===
==== Albums ====
- II & III (1986)
- Camper Van Beethoven (1986)
- Camper van Chadbourne (with Eugene Chadbourne) (1987)
- Vampire Can Mating Oven (1987)
- Our Beloved Revolutionary Sweetheart (1988)
- Key Lime Pie (1989)
- Tusk (2002)
- New Roman Times (2004)
- La Costa Perdida (2013)
- El Camino Real (2014)

===== Compilations and Special Releases =====
- The Virgin Years (1993) (Camper Van Beethoven and Cracker)
- Camper Vantiquities (1993) – rarities compilation
- Cigarettes & Carrot Juice: The Santa Cruz Years (2002) – box set
- In the Mouth of the Crocodile – Live in Seattle (2004) – live album
- Discotheque CVB: Live In Chicago (2005) – live EP
- Camper Van Beethoven Is Dead. Long Live Camper Van Beethoven (2000) – rarities

=== with Monks of Doom ===
- Soundtrack to the Film "Breakfast on the Beach of Deception" (1987)
- The Cosmodemonic Telegraph Company (1989)
- Meridian (1991)
- The Insect God (EP, 1992)
- Forgery (1993)
- What's Left For Kicks? (2004)
- The Brönte Pin (2017)

=== Solo albums ===
- Handed Down the Wire (2001)
- Trains Change (2007)
- Songs From the Imperial Garden (2020)
- Underwater Detection Method (2024)

=== Other recordings (as guitarist) ===
- Jonathan Segel – Storytelling (1989)
- The Electric Chairmen – Toast (1996
- Jonathan Segel – Edgy Not Antsy (2003)

=== With Victor Krummenacher ===
- Victory Out in the Heat (1995)
- Saint John's Mercy (1998)
- The Cock Crows at Sunrise (2007)
- Patriarch's Blues (2008)
- Blue Pacific (2018)
- Filthy thieving bastards A Melody of Retreads and Broken Quills (2001)
