= Telephone Free Landslide Victory =

Studio album by Camper Van Beethoven
- Released: June 1985
- Recorded: January–February 1985
- Studio: Sámurai Sound, Davis, California
- Genre: Alternative rock, jangle pop
- Length: 39:37
- Label: Independent Project

Camper Van Beethoven chronology
Telephone Free Landslide Victory (1985)	II & III (1986)

Telephone Free Landslide Victory is an album by musical group Camper Van Beethoven, released on Independent Project Records in June 1985. It featured the band's best known song, "Take the Skinheads Bowling". The album has sold over 60,000 copies.

== About ==
The band's lineup at the time of recording was David Lowery (lead vocals, rhythm guitar), Jonathan Segel (violin, keyboards, guitar, backing vocals), Chris Molla (guitar, backing vocals), Victor Krummenacher (bass, backing vocals), and Anthony Guess (drums). The album is the only Camper Van Beethoven record not to feature guitarist Greg Lisher. Lisher is actually listed in the album credits as a band member, but he did not join the band until after the album was recorded.

The reunited Camper Van Beethoven frequently features several of the album's songs in their set lists, including "Take the Skinheads Bowling", the countrified Black Flag cover "Wasted", the hardcore send-up "Club Med Sucks", "The Day That Lassie Went to the Moon", "Ambiguity Song", and several of the instrumentals.

The band originally intended the album to be titled Telephone Tree Landslide Victory, but a friend who was producing advance copies of the LP on cassette mistakenly replaced "Tree" with "Free".

== Reception ==
Professional ratings
Review scores
Source	Rating
AllMusic	4.5/5 stars
Blender	4/5 stars
The Rolling Stone Album Guide	3/5 stars
Spin Alternative Record Guide	7/10
The Village Voice	A−

Michael Stipe named Telephone Free Landslide Victory one of his ten favorite albums of 1985 in a list he wrote for Rolling Stone.

== Track listing ==
=== Original 1985 version ===
==== Side one ====
1. "Border Ska" – 2:50
2. "The Day That Lassie Went to the Moon" – 3:14
3. "Wasted" – 1:59 (Greg Ginn, Keith Morris)
4. "Yanqui Go Home" – 2:41
5. "Oh No!" – 1:54
6. "9 of Disks" – 2:36
7. "Payed Vacation: Greece" – 1:52
8. "Where the Hell Is Bill?" – 2:06
9. "Vladivostock" – 2:22

==== Side two ====
1. "Skinhead Stomp" – 1:48
2. "Tina" – 1:37 (The Tokens)
3. "Take the Skinheads Bowling" – 2:32
4. "Mao Reminisces About His Days in Southern China" – 1:59
5. "I Don't See You" – 2:23
6. "Balalaika Gap" – 2:13
7. "Opi Rides Again – Club Med Sucks" – 3:55
8. "Ambiguity Song" – 2:29

=== 2004 CD reissue ===
1. "The Day That Lassie Went to the Moon" – 3:14
2. "Border Ska" – 2:56
3. "Wasted" – 1:55
4. "Yanqui Go Home" – 2:41
5. "Oh No!" – 1:54
6. "9 of Disks" – 2:36
7. "Payed Vacation: Greece" – 1:52
8. "Where the Hell Is Bill?" – 2:05
9. "Wasting All Your Time" – 2:59
10. "Epigram #5" – 0:09
11. "At Kuda" – 2:14
12. "Epigram #2" – 0:21
13. "Cowboys From Hollywood (Original Version)" – 1:41
14. "Colonel Enrique Adolfo Bermudez" – 2:09
15. "Vladivostock" – 2:22
16. "Skinhead Stomp" – 1:47
17. "Tina" – 1:37
18. "Take the Skinheads Bowling" – 2:32
19. "Mao Reminisces About His Days in Southern China" – 1:59
20. "I Don't See You" – 2:23
21. "Balalaika Gap" – 2:13
22. "Opi Rides Again" – 0:50
23. "Club Med Sucks" – 3:05
24. "Ambiguity Song" – 2:30
25. "Heart (Remix)" – 3:07 (Hidden Track)
- Track 9 is a previously unreleased studio outtake.
- Tracks 10–14 originally released on the Take the Skinheads Bowling EP.

== Personnel ==
Camper Van Beethoven

- David Lowery – lead vocals, guitars, drums
- Jonathan Segel – violin, backing vocals, keyboards, mandolin, noises
- Chris Molla – guitars, backing vocals, drums
- Victor Krummenacher – bass, backing vocals
- Anthony Guess – drums

== Charts ==
Chart (1986)	Peak position
UK Indie Chart	30
