= David Immerglück =

American multi-instrumentalist (born 1961)

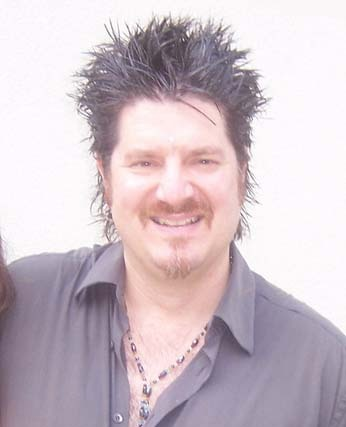
- Immerglück in 2006

Background information
- Also known as: "Immy", "Immer", "Bindi Boy"
- Born: David A. Immerglück; May 3, 1961 (age 65); Berkeley, California
- Genres: Rock; alternative rock; folk; soul; experimental
- Occupations: Musician; songwriter; record producer
- Instruments: Guitar; vocals; mandolin; bass guitar; banjo; sitar; keyboards; harmonica
- Years active: 1985–present
- Website: gimmyimmy.com

David A. Immerglück (born May 3, 1961) is an American multi-instrumentalist who is best known as the guitarist in the alternative rock bands Counting Crows, Camper Van Beethoven and the Monks of Doom, as well as for his tenure with American singer songwriter John Hiatt.

== Musical career ==
=== Early bands ===
Immerglück began playing music in the San Francisco Bay area. Like other aspiring young musicians, he played with various childhood friends, but began a lifetime habit of joining or "sitting in" with more than one band at a time, learning from the exposure to other differing musical influences and interests. He early began to experiment with different sounds with a growing interest in instruments beyond just the guitar. Initially emerging in the early 80's as musician/engineer in an esoteric rock band/studio collective called Polymorph, Immerglück recorded his first single with a band named Mod-L Society (featuring future Counting Crow Adam Duritz): "Back To Baltimore"/"Janie", in 1985.

=== The Ophelias ===
By 1987, he joined popular SF band The Ophelias (signed to the San Francisco wing of British label Rough Trade Records), touring and recording two albums with them ("Oriental Head" and "The Big O"), while continuing to pursue his interests in producing and/or playing with other bands in the fertile Bay Area indie rock scene. Immerglück played with The Ophelias for the better part of the next three years, until joining Camper Van Beethoven in the summer of 1989. The Ophelias released a retrospective compilation album "Bare Bodkin" in 2017, containing many previously unreleased tracks.

=== Monks of Doom and Camper Van Beethoven ===
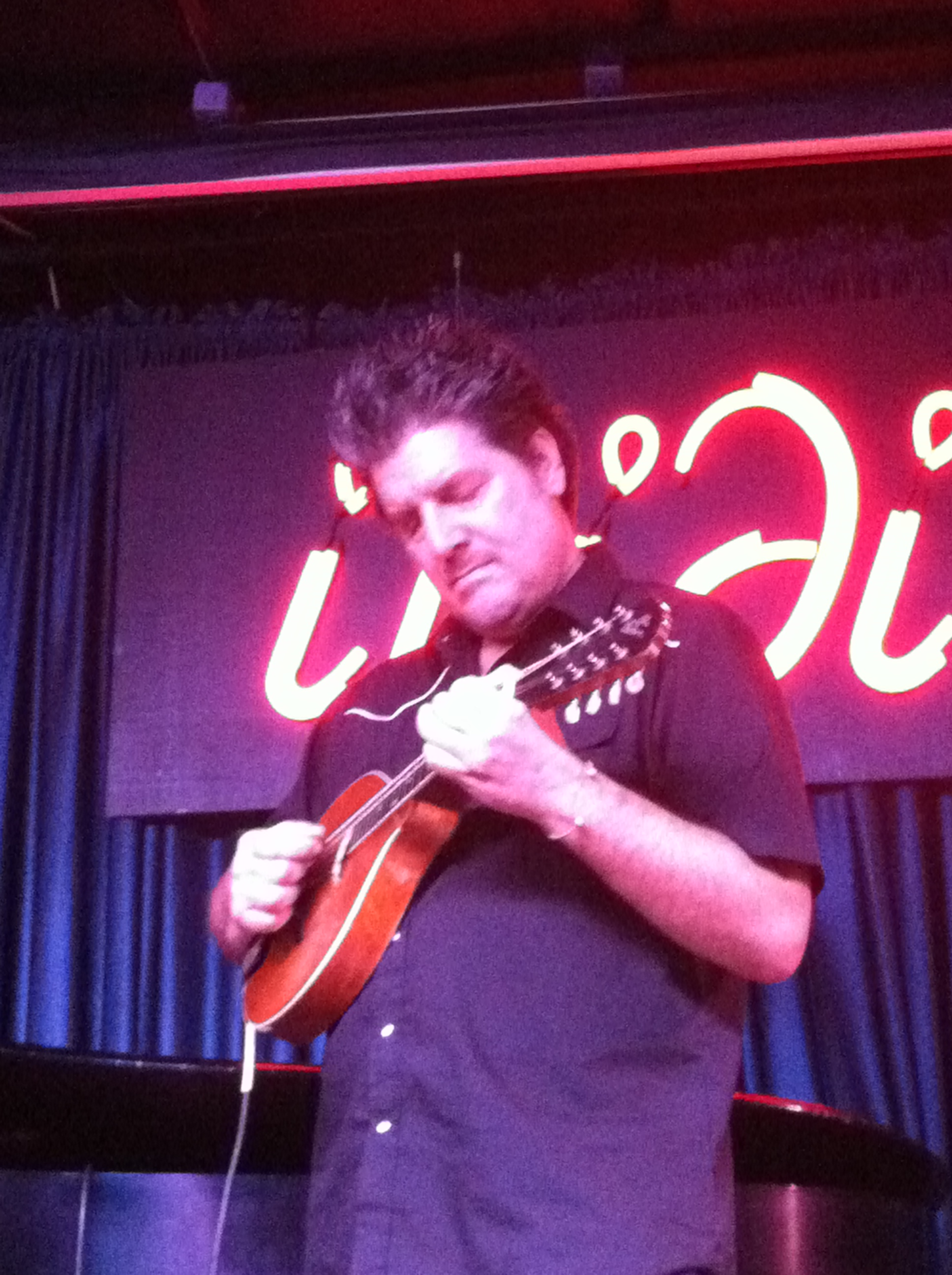
Immerglück in October 2012

The Monks of Doom were a side project formed by members of the popular progressive Bay area indie rock band Camper Van Beethoven. Formed in 1986, the Monks of Doom "somehow fused post-punk sensibilities with prog rock decadence and folk tradition elegance". Original guitarist Chris Molla left the group shortly after the band formed and was replaced by Immerglück, who contributed guitar, pedal steel, vocals, mandolin and keyboards. One Allmusic critic compared their work to "pop experimentalists Frank Zappa and Syd Barrett".

Bassist Victor Krummenacher noted, "We were interested in doing slightly more outside music that had heavier and more progressive tendencies. It was an outside expansion, a chance to go wherever our imagination took us." Immerglück described the sonic chemistry between that of himself and Lisher, the band's two guitarists, as music "that seemed to juxtapose the chaotic and the beautiful, the raw bluster and the ornate".

Immerglück joined Camper Van Beethoven as a member for the final tours of their initial run, prior to their breakup in 1990. The Monks of Doom intensified their activity after this, ultimately producing five albums to positive acclaim before the members took a long reprieve in 1993. Both groups have since reformed - Camper Van Beethoven in 1999 (with Immerglück peripherally involved as a part-time member), and the Monks of Doom in 2003 (with Immerglück involved full-time).

=== John Hiatt (and The Nashville Queens) ===
In late '94/early '95, on drummer Michael Urbano's recommendation, Immerglück was brought in to record seminal American songwriter John Hiatt's album Walk On. He became a permanent fixture in Hiatt's band, touring extensively, and went on to record two more albums (1997's Little Head and 2000's Grammy nominated Crossing Muddy Waters) as well as new tracks for a compilation (1998's Best of John Hiatt). His tenure with Hiatt ended in 1999, when he became a full-time member of Counting Crows.

=== Counting Crows ===
Around 1993, Immerglück became involved with an early incarnation of the modern rock group Counting Crows, and has since appeared in some capacity on all of Counting Crows' albums. Because of other musical projects, he initially functioned only as a session player. With his skills on guitar and a variety of other instruments, including both slide guitar and pedal steel guitar, mandolin, keyboards and backing vocals, he easily fell into place with old friends from the San Francisco Bay scene. Since 1999, Immergluck has been a permanent member of the band, touring and recording.

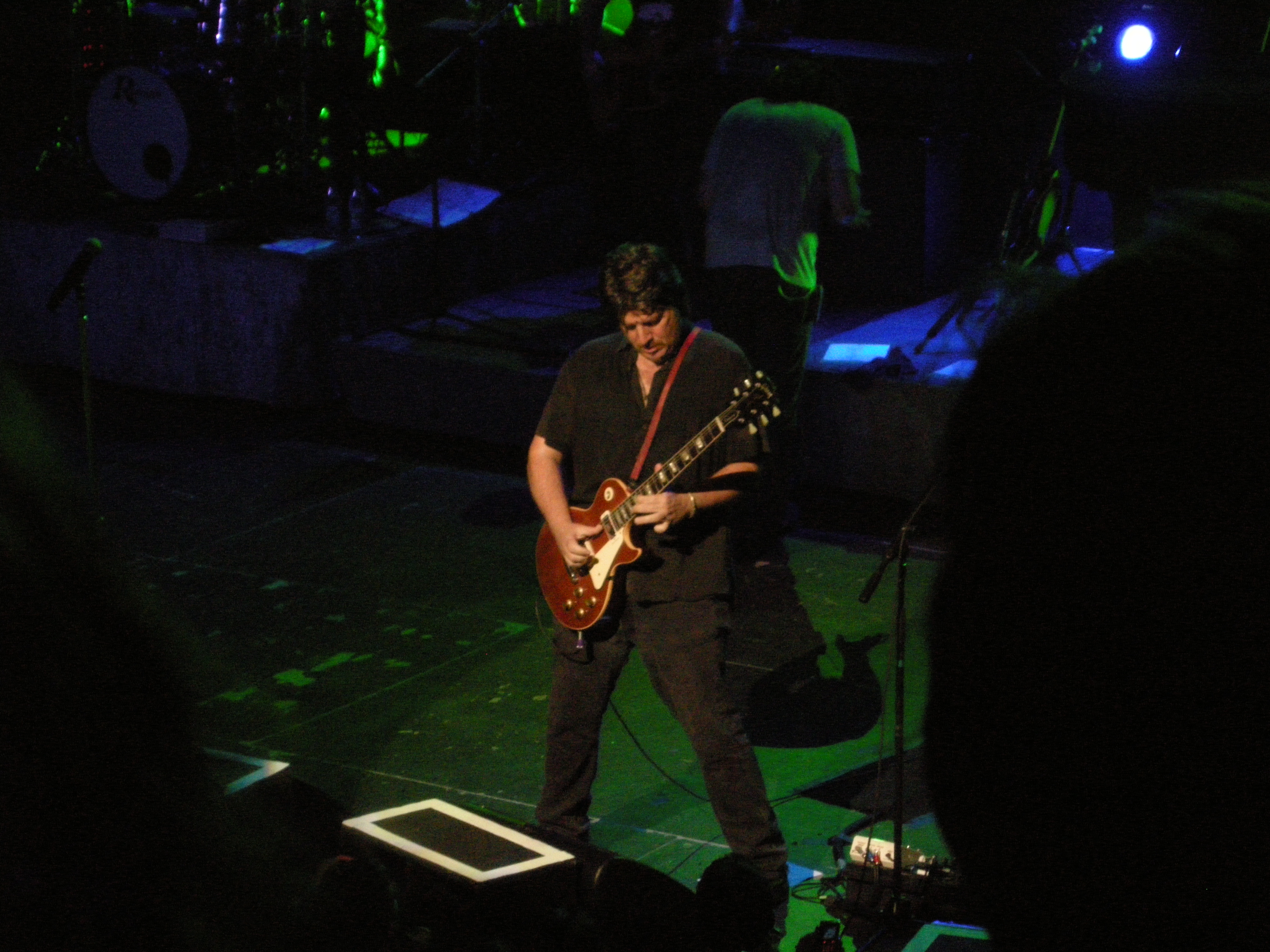
David Immerglück, 2008 Brussels, Belgium

=== Other musical work ===
Immerglück formed another band in the later 90's, Glider (also featuring Counting Crows' drummer Jim Bogios), during the time he was playing with John Hiatt. He has also performed as both a session musician and a sideman with a wide range of other artists, including John Hiatt, Coby Brown, Chantal Kreviazuk, James Maddock, Chris Stills, Tyson Meade, Elan Sara Defan, Cracker, Hootie & the Blowfish, Papa's Culture, Jonathan Segel, The Walkabouts, Johnny Hickman, Low Stars, Jason Karaban, Chris Seefried and Sordid Humor. Immerglück, along with Davey Faragher, was nominated for a Grammy Award for Best Contemporary Folk Album in 2001 for his work with John Hiatt's album Crossing Muddy Waters, a bluesy soulful album of only three performers, without drums, compared by some to the work of Tom Waits, with Immerglück contributing mandolin, 12-string guitar, slide guitar and vocals on many songs. In 2004, Immerglück again received a Grammy nomination, as well as Oscar and Golden Globe nominations as a co-writer for the Counting Crows song "Accidentally in Love" (the song featured in the film Shrek 2).

Immerglück also appeared on the solo debut by Paul Collins, formerly of The Beat and The Nerves. Recorded for Sony Records, the album was a blend of alternative country and rock, featuring Immerglück on guitar, alongside the core members of Chris Isaak's band, Silvertone.

In 2008, Immerglück began playing music with NYC based British singer/songwriter James Maddock, forming the acoustic duo Jimmy/Immy as well as sometimes playing in Maddock's band. Jimmy/Immy have toured extensively in Italy on several occasions, and continue to play regularly in the greater NYC area. 2012 saw the release of Jimmy/Immy Live at Rockwood Music Hall, and in 2016 Jimmy/Immy (w/Alex Valle) Live in Italia was released.

In 2013, Immerglück appeared on the opening track of Joseph Arthur's tenth studio album, The Ballad of Boogie Christ.

In 2016 Immerglück produced and played on flamboyant Indie Rock legend Tyson Meade's forthcoming album Robbing the Nuclear Family, as well as joining bizarre improv collective Mushroom.

== Equipment ==
Extensive description of instruments on the official website in the infobox:

- 1971 Gibson Les Paul Deluxe
- 1960 Fender Stratocaster
- 1963 Gibson Firebird I
- 1965 Fender Precision Bass
- 1917 Gibson A4 Mandolin
- Fender Pedal Steel
- ARP 2600

== Influences ==
Immerglück has listed a variety of musicians who were influences on his music. They include: Jimi Hendrix, Bob Dylan, David Bowie, Otis Redding, Captain Beefheart & The Magic Band, Can, Grateful Dead, Gang of Four, Peter Green's Fleetwood Mac, Led Zeppelin, Miles Davis, Tangerine Dream, The Rolling Stones, King Crimson, Pentangle, John Coltrane, Muddy Waters, Brian Eno, Tinariwen, and Roy Harper.
