= Pictures of Matchstick Men =

1968 single by the Status Quo

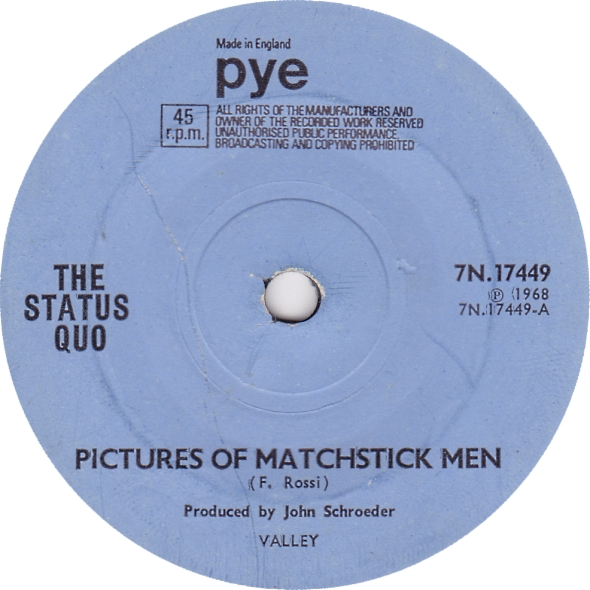
- A-side label of the UK vinyl release

Single by the Status Quo

from the album Picturesque Matchstickable Messages from the Status Quo
- B-side: "Gentleman Joe's Sidewalk Café"
- Released: 5 January 1968
- Studio: Pye, London
- Genre: Psychedelic rock; psychedelic pop
- Length: 3:09
- Label: Pye
- Songwriter: Francis Rossi
- Producer: John Schroeder

The Status Quo singles chronology
"Almost but Not Quite There" (1967)	"Pictures of Matchstick Men" (1968)	"Black Veils of Melancholy" (1968)

Official audio
- "Pictures of Matchstick Men" (Mono Version) on YouTube

"Pictures of Matchstick Men" is the first hit single by British rock band the Status Quo. It was released on 5 January 1968.

== The Status Quo version ==
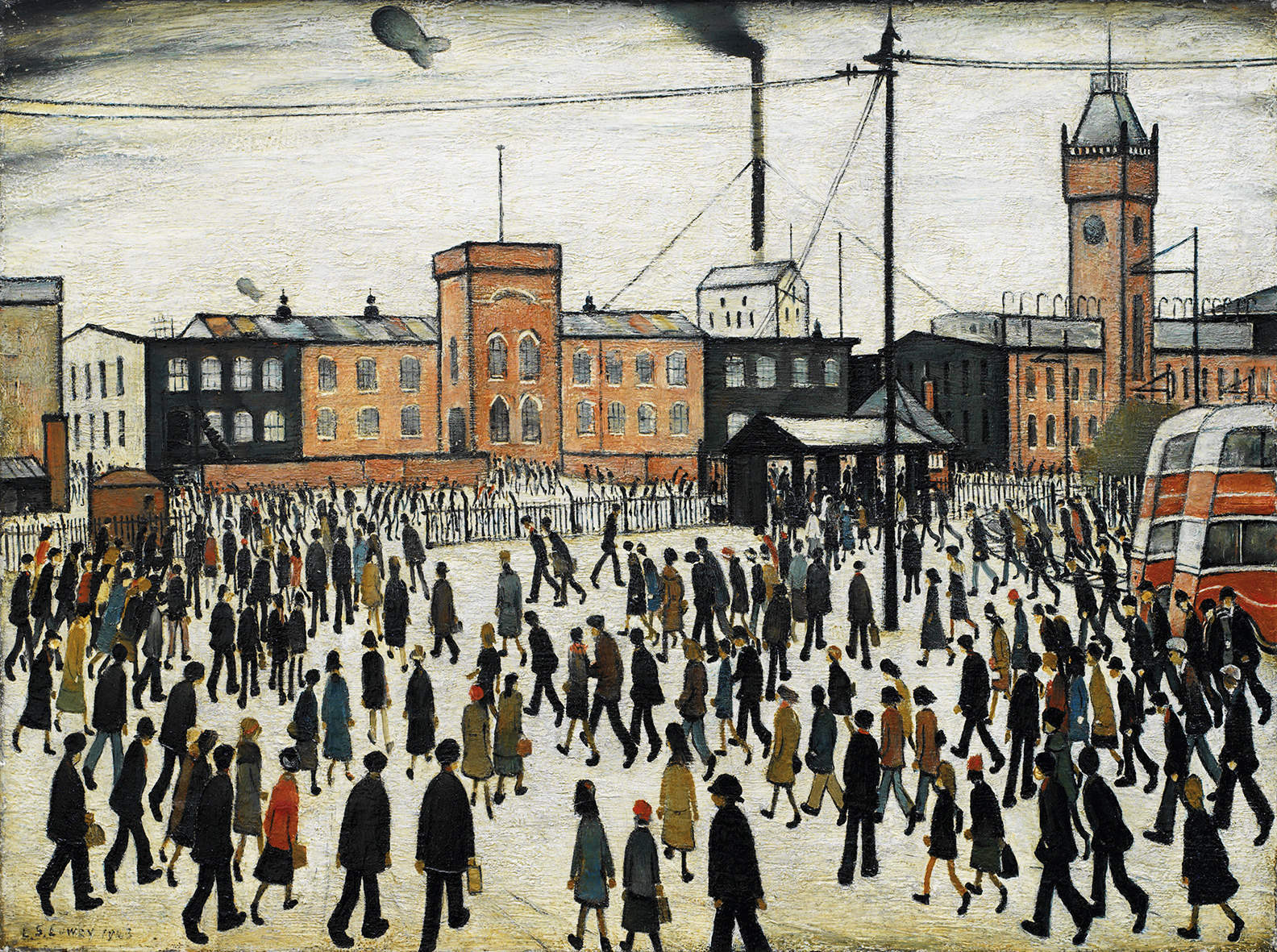
A painting by L. S. Lowry including his characteristic "matchstick men"

The song reached number seven on the UK Singles Chart, number eight in Canada, and number 12 on the US Billboard Hot 100, becoming their only top-40 single in the United States. Francis Rossi confirmed on DVD2 of the Pictures set, that it was originally intended to be a B-side to "Gentleman Joe's Sidewalk Cafe", but it was decided to swap the B-side and the A-side of the single.

There are two versions, one in stereo and another in mono, with significant differences: the original single was in mono and has the trademark wah-wah guitar in the breaks between lyrics, but this is omitted in stereo.

The song opens with a single guitar repeatedly playing a simple four-note riff before the bass, rhythm guitar, organ, drums and vocals begin. "Pictures of Matchstick Men" is one of a number of songs from the late 1960s which feature the flanging audio effect. The band's next single release, "Black Veils of Melancholy", was similar but flopped, which caused a change of musical direction.

Rossi (living in a prefab in Camberwell at the time) later said of the song:

I wrote it on the bog. I'd gone there, not for the usual reasons... but to get away from the wife and mother-in-law. I used to go into this narrow frizzing toilet and sit there for hours, until they finally went out. I got three quarters of the song finished in that khazi. The rest I finished in the lounge.

The "matchstick men" reference is to the paintings of Salford artist L. S. Lowry.

== Releases ==
- 1968: "Pictures of Matchstick Men" / "Gentleman Joe's Sidewalk Cafe" [Promo] 45 rpm Vinyl 7"; Pye / 7N 17449
- 1969: "Retrato de hombre con bastón" / "El café del caballero Joe" 33 rpm, Mono Vinyl 7"; Music Hall / MH 31.101 Argentina
- 1973: "Pictures of Matchstick Man" / "Ice in the Sun" 45 rpm Vinyl 7"; Pye / 12 746 AT

== Camper Van Beethoven version ==
In 1989, Camper Van Beethoven scored a number 1 hit on the Billboard Modern Rock Tracks chart in the United States with their version from the album Key Lime Pie.

== Charts ==
Chart (1968)	Peak position
Australian Singles (Kent Music Report)	19
Austria (Ö3 Austria Top 40)	18
Belgium (Ultratop 50 Wallonia)	18
Canada Top Singles (RPM)	8
Germany (GfK)	7
Netherlands (Single Top 100)	3
New Zealand (Listener)	7
Switzerland (Schweizer Hitparade)	5
UK Singles (Official Charts)	7
US Billboard Hot 100	12

== See also ==
- List of Billboard Modern Rock Tracks number ones of the 1980s
- Matchstalk Men and Matchstalk Cats and Dogs
