= Camper Van Beethoven Is Dead. Long Live Camper Van Beethoven =

Compilation album by Camper Van Beethoven
- Released: 2000
- Label: Pitch-A-Tent Records

Professional ratings
Review scores
Source	Rating
AllMusic	4/5 stars

Camper Van Beethoven Is Dead. Long Live Camper Van Beethoven is a 2000 rarities compilation album by Camper Van Beethoven, released on Pitch-A-Tent Records. The album stands as the first product of the members of CVB beginning to collaborate again. The songs here are taken from a collection of old live recordings from the 1980s retooled and remixed, combined with new songs, unreleased demo takes and more.

== Track listing ==
1. "Broadcasting Live From The MCI-Worldcom-ATT-Chrysler-Daimler-Mitsubishi-Phillips-BASF-LG-Phillip Morris-BP-Texaco-Pfizer-AOL-Time-Warner-Boeing-Microsoft-Aeroflot-United-Yoyodyne Coliseum, Strom Thurmond City, Mars"
2. "L'Aguardiente"
3. "Tom Flower's 1500 Valves"
4. "All Her Favourite Fruit (orchestral)"
5. "Closing Theme"
6. "Loose Lips Sink Ships"
7. "Who Are the Brain Police?"
8. "Staying at Home with the Girls in the Morning (Vienna Club Mix)"
9. "Klondike"
10. "SP37957/Hava Nagila/Dazed and Confused Medley"
11. "Balalaika Gap"
12. "The Perfect Enigma Machine"
13. "We're All Wasted and We're Wasting All Your Time"

== Notes ==
- "...Strom Thurmond City, Mars" was reportedly performed live at least once at a stop in Germany on the 2003 tour.
- "L'Aguardiente" was originally performed during the Key Lime Pie tour, with Morgan Fichter on violin, her playing is featured here as well as on other tracks.
- "Tom Flower's..." features a backing track of Polly Jean Harvey, taken from Jonathan Segel's answering machine.
- The recording of "All Her Favorite Fruit" here is also featured on "Greatest Hits Played Faster," the fifth disc of Cigarettes & Carrot Juice: The Santa Cruz Years.
- "Closing Theme" was originally intended as the album closer for Key Lime Pie, but ended up as a b-side and also appeared under the title "Guitar Hero"
- "Who Are the Brain Police?" is a Frank Zappa and The Mothers song from the album Freak Out!.
- "Klondike" was performed in concert at least once, at a Cracker performance.
- "We're All Wasted..." features backwards tracks from "Devil Song" and "Take the Skinheads Bowling." The song is also featured on the 2004 CD reissue of Telephone Free Landslide Victory.
