= II & III =

Studio album by Camper Van Beethoven
- Released: January 1986
- Genre: Alternative rock, neo-psychedelia
- Length: 44:13 (original); 55:43 (2004 reissue)
- Label: Pitch-A-Tent

Camper Van Beethoven chronology
Telephone Free Landslide Victory (1985)	II & III (1986)	Camper Van Beethoven (1986)

Professional ratings
Review scores
Source	Rating
AllMusic	3.5/5 stars
Blender	4/5 stars
The Rolling Stone Album Guide	4/5 stars
Sounds	4.5/5 stars
Spin Alternative Record Guide	7/10
The Village Voice	A−

II & III is a 1986 album by musical group Camper Van Beethoven, released on Pitch-a-Tent and Rough Trade. It was the band's second album.

After releasing their debut album, original drummer Anthony Guess left the band, and guitarist Greg Lisher joined. With the band temporarily lacking a drummer, guitarist Chris Molla played many of the drum parts on II & III. As the album was being finished, they finally found a permanent replacement for Guess with Chris Pedersen, who ended up playing on only one song, "We're a Bad Trip".

The album also found violinist/multi-instrumentalist Jonathan Segel singing lead vocals for the first time, on the tracks "Chain of Circumstance" and "We're a Bad Trip", the latter which featured him and Lowery trading verses.

II & III found the band already moving past the mixture of faux ethnic instrumentals and absurdist folk-pop-punk tunes of their debut album, for an even more eclectic sound, including elements of Americana, psychedelia, and Middle-Eastern music. Molla played steel guitar on some songs, and Segel played mandolin, adding to the country influences. There are relatively fewer instrumentals, with the vocal songs taking on many of the ethnic elements that were contained on the debut album's instrumental numbers.

It contains several notable songs, especially "Sad Lovers Waltz", a slow alt-country number that did much to dispel the band's then-image as a novelty band. Another Americana-style song was a bluegrass-influenced cover of "I Love Her All the Time" by Sonic Youth, which continued the band's traditions of doing countrified versions of punk and alternative songs.

The song "Circles" bears a close resemblance to "Oh No!" from Telephone Free Landslide Victory: the former features the same chords as the latter but reversed, and has slower verses.

== Track listing ==
All tracks composed by Camper Van Beethoven; except where indicated

=== Original 1986 version ===
==== Side one ====
1. "Abundance" - 1:53
2. "Cowboys from Hollywood" - 1:43
3. "Sad Lovers Waltz" - 4:03
4. "Turtlehead" - 1:16
5. "I Love Her All the Time" (Sonic Youth) - 2:16
6. "No Flies on Us" - 1:46
7. "Down and Out" - 1:35
8. "No Krugerrands for David" - 2:32
9. "(Don't You Go To) Goleta" - 1:21
10. "4 Year Plan" - 1:49

==== Side two ====
1. "(We're A) Bad Trip" - 2:32
2. "Circles" - 2:52
3. "Dust Pan" - 1:54
4. "Sometimes" - 2:37
5. "Chain of Circumstance" - 2:27
6. "ZZ Top Goes to Egypt" - 3:07
7. "Cattle (Reversed)" - 2:50
8. "Form Another Stone" - 2:09
9. "No More Bullshit" - 3:08

=== 2004 CD reissue ===
1. "Abundance" - 1:53
2. "Cowboys from Hollywood" - 1:43
3. "Sad Lovers Waltz" - 4:03
4. "Turtlehead" - 1:16
5. "I Love Her All the Time" - 2:16
6. "No Flies on Us" - 1:46
7. "Down and Out" - 1:35
8. "No Krugerrands for David" - 2:32
9. "(Don't You Go To) Goleta" - 1:21
10. "4 Year Plan" - 1:49
11. "Devil Song (Original Version)" - 2:07
12. "Vampire Club" - 4:11
13. "(We're A) Bad Trip" - 2:32
14. "Circles" - 2:52
15. "Dust Pan" - 1:54
16. "Sometimes" - 2:27
17. "Chain of Circumstances (Replacement Version)" - 2:37
18. "ZZ Top Goes to Egypt" - 3:07
19. "Cattle (Reversed)" - 2:50
20. "Form Another Stone (Replacement Version)" - 2:09
21. "Circles Dub" - 2:49
22. "(We're A) Bad Trip (Original Version)" - 2:46
23. "No More Bullshit" - 3:08
- Tracks 11–12 and 21–22 are bonus tracks.

== Charts ==
Chart (1987)	Peak position
UK Indie Chart	8
