= Camper Van Beethoven =

American rock band

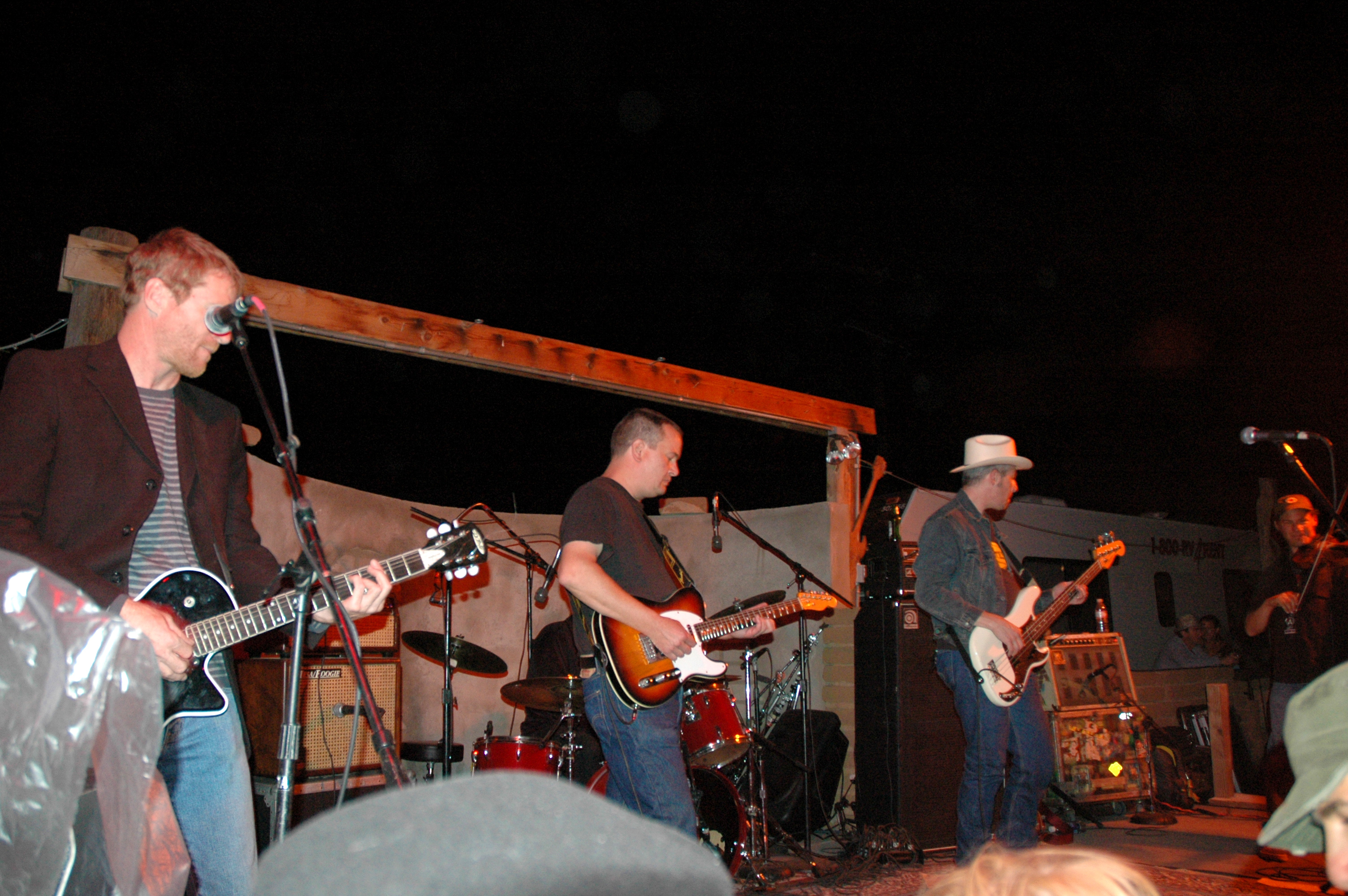
- Camper Van Beethoven performing in 2006

Background information
- Also known as: Camper Van Beethoven and the Border Patrol
- Origin: Redlands, California, U.S.
- Genres: Alternative rock, college rock, indie rock, psychedelic rock, world fusion
- Years active: 1983–1990, 1999–present
- Labels: I.R.S, Vanguard, Virgin, Pitch-A-Tent, Rough Trade
- Members: David Lowery; Victor Krummenacher; Jonathan Segel; Greg Lisher; Chris Pedersen
- Website: Official website

Camper Van Beethoven is an American rock band formed in Redlands, California, in 1983, later based in Santa Cruz and San Francisco. Their style mixes elements of pop, ska, punk, folk, alternative, country, and world music, among other genres. The band initially polarized audiences within the hardcore punk scene of California's Inland Empire and then found wider acceptance and, eventually, an international audience. Their strong iconoclasm and emphasis on do-it-yourself values proved influential to the burgeoning indie rock movement.

The band's first three independent records were released within an 18-month period. Their debut single was "Take the Skinheads Bowling", a song with nonsensical lyrics that became an unexpected hit. The group signed to Virgin Records in 1987, released two albums and enjoyed chart success with their 1989 cover of Status Quo's "Pictures of Matchstick Men", a number one hit on Billboard Magazine's Modern Rock Tracks. They disbanded the following year due to internal tensions.

Lead singer David Lowery formed Cracker, David Immerglück joined Counting Crows, and several other members played in Monks of Doom. Beginning in 1999, Camper Van Beethoven reunited and made several new records.

== History ==
=== Formative and early years (1983–1985) ===
Camper Van Beethoven was preceded by several related garage bands based in Redlands, including Sitting Duck and the Estonian Gauchos (featuring future Cracker guitarist Johnny Hickman). These bands included future Camper Van Beethoven members bassist and vocalist David Lowery, guitarist and multi-instrumentalist Chris Molla, and often drummer Bill McDonald as well. The Estonian Gauchos and a late incarnation of Sitting Duck also included another future Camper Van Beethoven member, bassist Victor Krummenacher, whose joining allowed Lowery to switch to rhythm guitar. Sitting Ducks played a mixture of punk and acid rock, along with what Lowery described as "fake Russian-sounding music". At the same time, Lowery, Molla and Krummenacher were studying in Santa Cruz at the University of California, Santa Cruz, and were musically active there as well. The former two played in the Santa Cruz-based Box O' Laffs, which also included future Camper Van Beethoven members Richie West, Anthony Guess, and Chris Pedersen at various times.

While on summer break in 1983, Lowery and Molla returned to Redlands and formed a new band, Camper Van Beethoven and the Border Patrol. The group featured Lowery, Molla, Krummenacher and McDonald, along with several other musicians at various points, including guitarist David McDaniel, harmonica player Mike Zorn and violinist Daniel Blume. Although this initial incarnation of the band only existed for three months, during this time they wrote much of the material which would feature on their debut album, including "Take the Skinheads Bowling". The band's name was coined by McDaniel: according to Lowery "McDaniel was into this stuff that would sound like it made sense, but really it didn’t... He’d watch a lot of TV, accept all this mass-media stuff and spit it out all chopped up. I got the whole absurdism influence from him".

When Lowery, Molla and Krummenacher returned to college in Santa Cruz, Lowery and Molla resumed playing with Box O' Laffs. After meeting violinist, keyboardist and guitarist Jonathan Segel, they decided to re-form Camper Van Beethoven and the Border Patrol in Santa Cruz, with drummer Richie West replacing McDonald.

=== First three albums and member changes (1985–1987) ===
In 1985, the band reduced its name to Camper Van Beethoven, replaced West with Anthony Guess, and recorded their debut album, Telephone Free Landslide Victory. The record featured their first successful single, "Take the Skinheads Bowling", the lesser hit "The Day That Lassie Went to the Moon", and an experimental country-influenced cover version of Black Flag's "Wasted". The album featured songs with humorous lyrics, often simultaneously celebrating and mocking 1980s counterculture, and instrumental tracks featuring ska-beats and Eastern European, Mexican or Spaghetti-Western influenced guitar or violin lines.

Shortly after this record was released, lead guitarist Greg Lisher joined the group. The band recorded a set of songs with an expanded version of the lineup that recorded the debut, with Lisher playing lead on some songs. Guess departed shortly thereafter, leaving Lowery and Molla briefly to take turns swapping drumming duties. This incarnation recorded a second set of songs, with Molla handling the drums. At the end of the sessions, in 1986, long-term drummer Chris Pedersen was added.

The band's second album, II & III, was culled from both recording sessions, and released in early 1986. Segel played mandolin and sitar in addition to violin, and Molla played pedal steel guitar on some tracks. The album featured a noticeably expanded sound, with influences of country music and Americana mixed in with faux Indian or Arabic music and psychedelia.

Molla had left the band by the time the album came out, finding that their constant live activity was getting in the way of his studies. The band played their first national tour in the spring as a 5-piece with Lisher on guitar. After finishing the tour, Lisher temporarily left the band as well, and Molla rejoined. The band started recording their next album in May 1986, with Molla on guitar and pedal steel. The band invited Lisher to play on the sessions, and he ended up rejoining.

Released in August 1986, their self-titled third album featured guest membership from experimental banjo and guitar player Eugene Chadbourne on their cover of Pink Floyd's "Interstellar Overdrive" and several other tracks. On the album, the elements of psychedelia on the previous album came to the fore. The album also featured some satirical political commentary on songs like "Good Guys and Bad Guys" and "Joe Stalin's Cadillac," the former which enjoyed some underground college radio play. Krummenacher, Lisher, Pedersen and Molla also formed the side project Monks of Doom, although Molla was quickly replaced by guitarist David Immerglück.

Molla left Camper Van Beethoven again, this time for good, after touring for the third album, reducing the band to a five-piece with Lowery, Krummenacher, Segel, Lisher, and Pedersen — the longest-standing lineup in their initial career. Released in November 1987, the EP Vampire Can Mating Oven preceded a major label bidding war. The EP featured a more streamlined and accessible sound, with Lisher's lead guitar taking a major role for the first time.

=== Virgin Records years (1987–1990) ===
In 1987 the band signed to Virgin Records. They released their fourth album and major label debut Our Beloved Revolutionary Sweetheart in May 1988. The album featured a more streamlined, song-oriented approach, cutting back on the psychedelia and reducing the number of instrumentals, but keeping much of their eclectic approach. This was followed by extensive touring and preparations for recording their next album.

Due to internal tensions, Segel left the band during rehearsals for their fifth album in early 1989. Written mostly as a four-piece, the resultant LP, Key Lime Pie, featured the violin playing of Don Lax before the replacement violinist Morgan Fichter (of the Bay Area band Harm Farm) was found. Fichter played violin on Opening Theme, Pictures of Matchstick Men and Flowers, the final songs recorded for the album.

The album featured a noticeably darker lyrical outlook as compared to the band's previous records. Musically, it featured less of the world-music influences of the previous albums, replaced with more elements of Americana, along with a lusher, a more orchestrated version of psychedelia than their previous records had featured. They scored a minor hit with a cover of the Status Quo song "Pictures of Matchstick Men", their highest-charting single.

David Immerglück (of the Ophelias and the Monks of Doom) joined in 1990 for touring behind the record, playing some of the departed Molla and Segel's instrumental parts on steel guitar, guitar and mandolin. They broke up in April 1990 after a show in Örebro, Sweden.

=== Inactive period (1990–1999) ===
Camper Vantiquities, a compilation album packaging the Vampire Can Mating Oven EP with outtakes, demos, and rarities, was released in 1993.

After disbanding, Lowery and Hickman formed Cracker with bassist Davey Faragher. Krummenacher, Lisher, Immerglück and Pedersen intensified their activities in Monks of Doom, which remained active until 1993. These members also collaborated with Chadbourne under the name Camper Van Chadbourne. Immerglück later collaborated with Counting Crows, officially joining the group in 1999. Krummenacher began a solo career, recording several solo albums with guests such as Dave Alvin. Pedersen moved to Australia in 1998.

Segel played with Dieselhed and Sparklehorse, and fronted his own bands Hieronymus Firebrain and Jack & Jill, later playing under his own name. He later became involved in experimental and electronic music, including collaborations with Fred Frith and Joelle Leandre, and Chaos Butterfly, an electro-acoustic duo with Dina Emerson. Segel and Krummenacher also ran their own record label, Magnetic Motorworks.

=== Reunion; Tusk (1999–2004) ===
In 1999, Lowery, Segel, and Krummenacher regrouped in the studio to assemble the experimental rarity set Camper Van Beethoven Is Dead. Long Live Camper Van Beethoven, which also contained newly recorded material. Segel and Krummenacher, along with Greg Lisher, also joined Cracker for a tour, playing a set of Camper songs for a section of the set, backed by drummer Frank Funaro and other Cracker members.

In 2002, the group played its first proper live shows in twelve years. With Lowery, Segel, Krummenacher and Lisher forming the core of the reunited lineup, two New York dates also featured Immerglück and two members of Cracker, drummer Frank Funaro and keyboardist Kenny Margolis. Three California dates omitted these latter three musicians and saw Pedersen return to the kit.

Also in 2002, they released the double-CD Tusk, a re-recording of the entire Fleetwood Mac album of the same name. Although initially announced as a rediscovery of a series of 1987 demos, the album was recorded in 2001 by Lowery, Segel, Krummenacher and Lisher as an experiment to see if the members could now work together. Extensive touring, mostly with Margolis and Funaro, followed.

The group next released Cigarettes & Carrot Juice: The Santa Cruz Years, a five-disc box set compiling their first three (pre-Virgin) albums, Camper Vantiquities, and a live recording from 1990 they called Greatest Hits Played Faster. The latter recording featured live versions of several unreleased songs. Shortly thereafter, the band released "director's cut" versions of the first three records and Camper Vantiquities, which included remastering, re-sequencing and additional demo and B-side tracks.

=== New Roman Times; live and compilation releases (2004–2012) ===
In 2004, the band released New Roman Times, their first studio album of original material in 15 years. A concept album, the record detailed the rise and fall of an idealistic Texan whose disenchantment following a stint with the American military redirected him towards organized terrorism. It featured the band's familiar eclectic sound, but also added a heavier, prog-metal sound on a few tracks. The lineup on the album included Lowery, Krummenacher, Segel, Lisher, Pedersen and Immergluck. The album also featured contributions by other Camper Van Beethoven associates, including Molla and Hickman. Following the album's release, Pedersen and Immergluck did not participate in the touring lineup, and Funaro started to handle all of the drumming in live shows.

A limited-edition live concert disc was also released, In the Mouth of the Crocodile – Live in Seattle. Segments of a 2004 performance were released the following year as Discotheque CVB: Live in Chicago.

The band continued to frequently tour with Cracker (whom Krummenacher joined for a time), and in 2005 the two groups started an annual three-night "Campout" at Pappy and Harriet's Pioneertown Palace in Pioneertown, California. The Campout has seen appearances by Built to Spill, Neko Case, Magnolia Electric Company, and John Doe, as well as sets from the individual members of the band.

A compilation of greatest hits, Popular Songs of Great Enduring Strength and Beauty, was released by Cooking Vinyl Records in June 2008. As band relations with Virgin Records were poor, they were not granted access to any material from the two Virgin LPs for this compilation. Thus, the band re-recorded five songs from these albums to include on the collection. These were the first and only Camper Van Beethoven studio tracks to include Funaro.

In 2011, the band began playing a series of shows that featured the Key Lime Pie record in its entirety, often joined by Immergluck. In the same year, they also revealed plans for a new album.

=== La Costa Perdida, El Camino Real and likely end of touring activity (2013–present) ===
La Costa Perdida, the followup to New Roman Times, was released on January 22, 2013, preceded by the single "Northern California Girls". The music was inspired in part by Holland-era Beach Boys. Most of the drumming on the album was by studio drummer and former Cracker member Michael Urbano, although Chris Pederson played on some tracks as well. Much of the album featured a gentler, more folky sound than their previous albums.

Lowery revealed in interviews that there were seven songs recorded during the sessions for La Costa Perdida that were not released, which would be included on a follow-up album to be finished in 2013. In August 2013, the band revealed on its Facebook page that it was tracking songs for the album, with Urbano on drums again. The band stated that the album would be a Southern California-themed sequel to the Northern California theme of La Costa Perdida. On March 2, 2014, the band announced a title for the new album, El Camino Real, which was released on June 3, 2014, in the United States and on June 23, 2014, in the UK. In contrast to the previous album, it featured some of the band's most abrasive and intense music, mixing elements of prog-rock and punk with the band's trademark eclecticism.

For subsequent tour dates, the band initially alternated Pedersen and Urbano on drums, due to health problems that have prevented Frank Funaro from playing. Since 2015, Chris Pedersen has been flying in from Australia to participate in the band's infrequent tours, resulting in a reunion of their best-known late 80s lineup. David Immerglück also continued to join the band's lineup for occasional shows.

In 2015 the band contributed two tracks to the original motion picture soundtrack for the film Sharknado 3: Oh Hell No!, "Long Way to Go (Sharknado)" and "Infinite Ocean".

The band continued touring through 2020, and then did not play for several years thereafter. They embarked on a brief tour in 2025, with founding guitarist/drummer Chris Molla sitting in on accordion. These shows were billed as including "all original members", presumably referring to Molla's presence, although drummer Anthony Guess did not participate. During the tour, Lowery posted on social media that the September 20 performance at the 9:30 Club would likely be the final performance of the band, and referred to the difficulties of operating as a band with members in three different countries and five different time zones.

== Band members ==
Current members

- David Lowery – lead vocals, rhythm guitar, keyboards, bass, drums (1983–1990, 1999–present)
- Victor Krummenacher – bass, baritone guitar, vocals, occasional lead vocals (1983–1990, 1999–present)
- Jonathan Segel – violin, guitar, keyboards, sitar, mandolin, vocals, occasional lead vocals (1984–1989, 1999–present)
- Greg Lisher – lead guitar, backup vocals (1985–1990, 1999–present)
- Chris Pedersen – drums, backup vocals (1986–1990, 2004, 2015–present; 2002–2014 part-time)

Part-time members

- David Immerglück – guitar, lap steel guitar, mandolin, bass, backup vocals (1990; 2004, 2000–2003/2005–present part-time)
- Michael Urbano – drums (2011–present in studio, occasional live dates)

Former members

- Chris Molla – guitar, pedal steel, keyboards, accordion, drums, vocals (1983–1986; 2002–2004 part-time; 2025 as guest)
- David McDaniel – guitar (1983–1984)
- Bill McDonald – drums (1983–1984)
- Mike Zorn – harmonica (1983–1984)
- Daniel Blume – violin (1983–1984)
- Richie West – drums (1984)
- Anthony Guess – drums (1985)
- Eugene Chadbourne – guitar, banjo (1986, studio sessions only)
- Don Lax – violin (1989, studio sessions only)
- Morgan Fichter – violin, vocals (1989–1990)
- Frank Funaro – drums, backup vocals (2000–2004 as guest, 2004–2013 as member, mostly for live dates)
- Kenny Margolis – keyboards, accordion (2000–2006 as guest)

== Discography ==
Studio albums

- Telephone Free Landslide Victory (1985)
- II & III (1986)
- Camper Van Beethoven (1986)
- Our Beloved Revolutionary Sweetheart (1988)
- Key Lime Pie (1989)
- Tusk (2002)
- New Roman Times (2004)
- La Costa Perdida (2013)
- El Camino Real (2014)

EPs and singles

- Take the Skinheads Bowling (1986) – single
- Vampire Can Mating Oven (1987) – EP
- "Turquoise Jewelry" (1988)
- "Life Is Grand" (1988)
- "Pictures of Matchstick Men" (1990)
- "The History of Utah" (live) (2004) – split single with Calexico

Live albums

- In the Mouth of the Crocodile – Live in Seattle (2004) – live album
- Discotheque CVB: Live In Chicago (2005) – live EP

Compilations

- Camper Vantiquities (1993) – rarities compilation
- Camper Van Beethoven Is Dead. Long Live Camper Van Beethoven (2000) – rarities compilation
- Cigarettes & Carrot Juice: The Santa Cruz Years (2002) – boxed set
- Popular Songs of Great Enduring Strength and Beauty (2008) – greatest hits compilation

Various artist compilations

- Look at All the Love We Found (2005) – Sublime tribute album
- The Sandinista! Project (2007) – The Clash tribute album
- Sharknado 3: Oh Hell No! (2015) film soundtrack
