= David Lowery (musician) =

American singer-songwriter

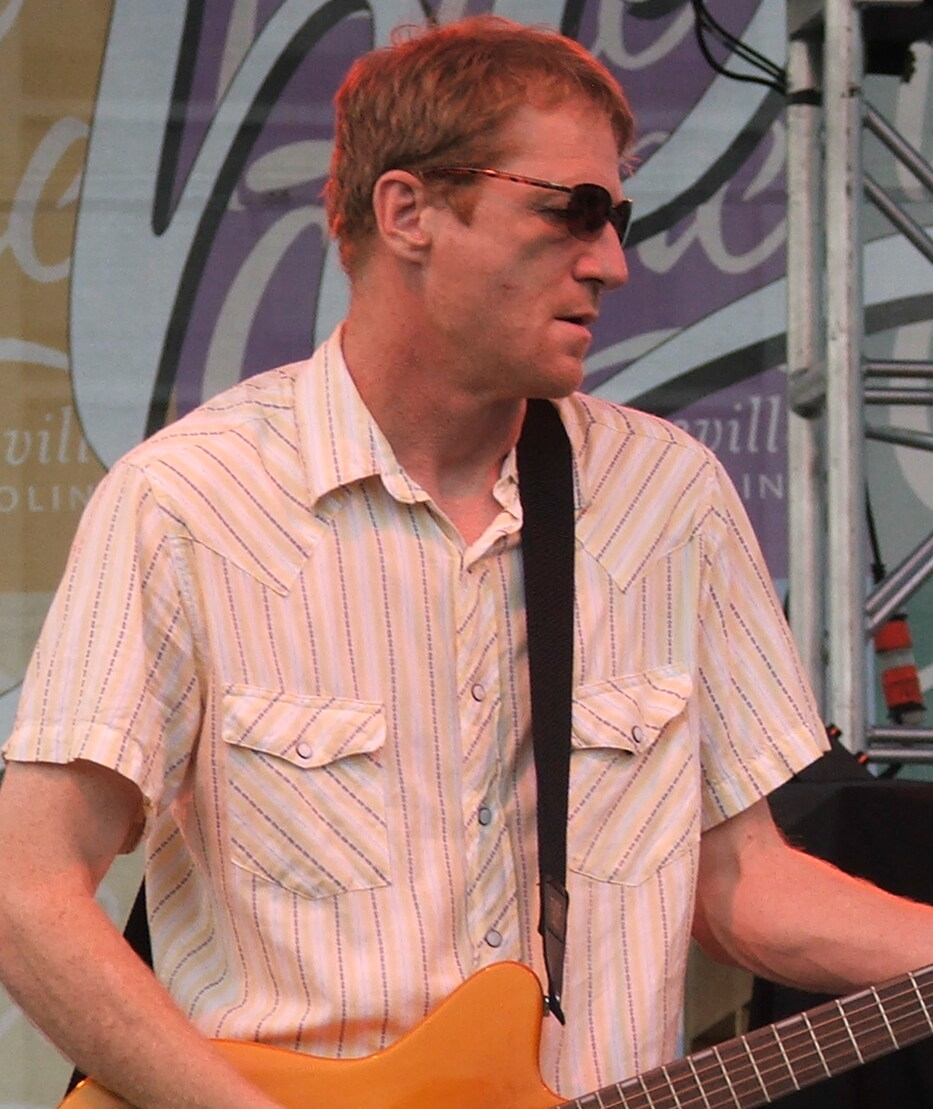
- Lowery in 2006

Background information
- Born: David Charles Lowery; September 10, 1960 (age 66); San Antonio, Texas, U.S.
- Origin: Redlands, California, U.S.
- Genres: Alternative rock, southern rock, alternative country, country
- Occupations: Musician, lecturer at UGA
- Instruments: Vocals; Guitar
- Years active: 1983–present
- Label: 429

David Charles Lowery (born September 10, 1960) is an American musician and academic. He is the founder of the alternative rock band Camper Van Beethoven and the co-founder of Cracker, a more traditional rock band. Lowery released his first solo album, The Palace Guards, in February 2011. Although both Cracker and Camper Van Beethoven continue to play live dates, since 2016 Lowery has focused on issuing new studio recordings only as a solo artist.

== Early life and education ==
Lowery was born in San Antonio, Texas, where his father was stationed with United States Air Force. He has described his parents as "a hillbilly and an English working-class woman." Due to his father's career, Lowery's family moved frequently before settling in Redlands, California, where he attended high school. He became involved in music as a member of the band Sitting Ducks, who played a mixture of punk and acid rock, along with what Lowery described as "fake Russian-sounding music."

== Career ==
Lowery's band, Sitting Ducks, evolved into Camper Van Beethoven, formed in 1983 in Santa Cruz, California. The band is best known for its cover of the Status Quo song "Pictures of Matchstick Men" from the Key Lime Pie LP and its original composition "Take the Skinheads Bowling," from the band's 1985 debut LP, Telephone Free Landslide Victory which was later featured in the Michael Moore movie Bowling for Columbine.

In the early 1990s, Lowery formed Cracker with guitarist and long-time friend Johnny Hickman and bassist Davey Faragher. Cracker rejected the indie-rock sound of Camper Van Beethoven in favor of a more traditional, roots-rock sound. Cracker's most successful hits are "Teen Angst (What the World Needs Now)" from the band's eponymous LP, released in 1992, and "Low", from 1993's Kerosene Hat. Cracker continues to perform today, although Camper Van Beethoven has also reformed, releasing a cover of the entire Fleetwood Mac album Tusk in 2002 and several new albums of original music, beginning with New Roman Times in 2004.

From 1990 to 1995, Lowery and Hickman also collaborated frequently with German band Freiwillige Selbstkontrolle (a/k/a FSK) and were occasionally listed as full members. Lowery produced and performed on the FSK albums Son Of Kraut (1991), The Sound Of Music (1993) and International (1995), to which he also contributed some of his own compositions (e.g. "Red Sonja" and "Dr Bernice" on The Sound of Music). Both Lowery and Hickman also joined FSK for concert tours in Europe and the US.

=== Other activities ===
Lowery graduated from the University of California, Santa Cruz in 1984 with a Bachelor of Arts degree in mathematics. He earned an Ed.D. from the University of Georgia of in 2018. He worked as a system operator after he graduated, then he worked in different jobs in the financial field and has started a number of music-related businesses, including a studio, a record company and a publishing company. Lowery's experience in business led to his appointment as a lecturer at the Terry College of Business's music business program. Charles Pitter of PopMatters has said that "in addition to this work, Lowery teaches as a lecturer and has a consistently high profile in the media as a champion of artists rights. As such, it could almost be said that Lowery has become the voice of a generation; however, it seems likely he would dismiss this title as meaningless blabber."

Lowery is critical of the internet era and says that things may be worse now for working musicians than they were under the old record system. In 2012, he gave a widely shared talk called "Meet the new boss, worse than the old boss" in which he criticized Pandora Radio for low songwriter royalties, claiming to have made less than $17 from a million streams of his song "Low."

In 2017, Spotify settled a class action lawsuit initiated by Lowery and Melissa Ferrick covering unpaid mechanical royalties. As part of the settlement, Spotify created a fund worth over $40 million to compensate songwriters and publishers affected. In January 2019, Lowery settled a lawsuit against Napster, which concerned unpaid mechanical royalties.

== Solo discography ==
- The Palace Guards (2011)
- Conquistador (2016)
- In the Shadow of the Bull (2019)
- Leaving Key Member Clause (2021)
- Vending Machine (2023)
- Fathers, Sons and Brothers (2025)
