= Jonathan Segel =

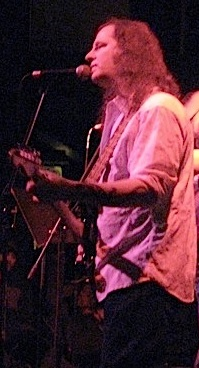
- Segel in 2013

Background information
- Born: September 3, 1963 (age 63); Marseille, France
- Genres: Alternative rock, pop rock, rock, progressive rock, blues, improv, avant-garde, electronica
- Occupations: Musician, songwriter, composer, record producer
- Instruments: Guitar, violin, mandolin, keyboards, voice
- Years active: 1983–present
- Website: jonathansegel.com

Jonathan Segel (born September 3, 1963) is an American composer and multi-instrumentalist. He has played with Camper Van Beethoven, Sparklehorse, Eugene Chadbourne, and Dieselhed.

== Early life and education ==
Segel was born in Marseille, France, and grew up in Davis, California and Tucson, Arizona. His parents, both professors at University of California, Davis, were biochemist Irwin H. Segel and microbiologist Wiltraud Pfeiffer.

Segel went to college at the University of California, Santa Cruz, where he studied under Peter Elsea and experimental music pioneer Gordon Mumma. He later obtained a master's degree in music composition at Mills College, studying with Fred Frith, Pauline Oliveros, Alvin Curran and Joëlle Léandre.

== Musical career ==
Segel joined the indie rock group Camper Van Beethoven in 1984, while in college at Santa Cruz. His contributions as violinist became the band's hallmark, creating a distinctive identity and sound. Personality conflicts with frontman David Lowery caused Segel to leave the band in 1989, prior to its 1990 breakup. Ten years later, Segel returned at Lowery's invitation when the group reunited. He has remained a member of the revived group since 1999.

During the period from 1989 to 1997, Segel was based in San Francisco, where he formed the experimental band Hieronymus Firebrain, which dissolved and reformed as Jack & Jill. He joined Dieselhed in 1989, and appeared on their 1993 self-titled debut album. He recorded or performed with projects such as Granfaloon Bus, Sideways, and Virginia Dare, and with Eugene Chadbourne.

From 1997 to 2001, in Los Angeles, Segel worked with sound editor Dane Davis at Danetracks, a film sound post-production facility. During this time, he performed and toured with Sparklehorse, Clyde Wrenn, Magnet, and Eugene Chadbourne, among others, in addition to Camper Van Beethoven.

Segel returned to the Bay Area in 2001, where he taught music theory and electronic music at the College of Marin and Ohlone College until 2009, and worked for Pandora from 2009 to 2012.

In 2012, Segel moved to Stockholm, Sweden, with his wife and daughter. Segel has collaborated since 2014 with the Copenhagen-based improvisational group Øresund Space Collective.

In addition to the revived Camper Van Beethoven, Segel records solo projects and leads the Jonathan Segel band, performs improvisational electronic or avant-garde music (either solo or, since 2004, with Chaos Butterfly), and he is an occasional contributor to music from the Big City Orchestra. His compositions have also included six chamber music scores written between 1989 and 2011.

== Partial discography ==
=== Solo recordings ===
- Storytelling (1988)
- Edgy Not Antsy (2003)
- Honey (2007)
- All Attractions (2012)
- Apricot Jam (2012)
- Shine Out (2014)
- "Superfluity" (2017)

=== Electronic and electro-acoustic solo projects ===
- Non-Linear Accelerator (2003)
- Rauk (2005)
- Amnesia/Glass Box (2005)
- Summerleaf (2006)
- Underwater Tigers (2007)

=== Selected side projects ===
==== Hieronymus Firebrain ====
- Hieronymus Firebrain (1991)
- Dr. Firebrain's Plane Crash Tape, Vol. 1 (1993)
- There (1994)
- Here (1994)

==== Jack and Jill ====
- Chill and Shrill (1995)
- Fancy Birdhouse (1997)
- Scissors and Paper (2000)

==== Chaos Butterfly ====
- Live at Studio Fabriken (2005) – live in Gothenburg, Sweden, with Biggi Vinkeloe
- threelivingthings (2005)
- Radio (2005)
