= Paul Watson (musician) =

American singer (1952–2024)

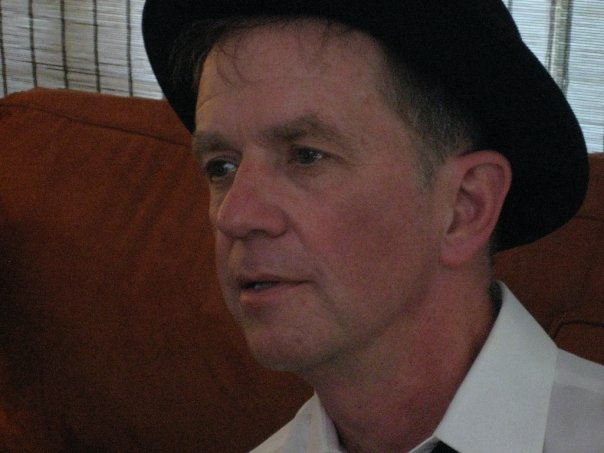

Background information
- Born: March 16, 1952; Monkey's Eyebrow, Kentucky, U.S.
- Died: November 20, 2024 (aged 72) Richmond, Virginia, U.S.
- Formerly of: Orthotonics, FSK, Sparklehorse

Paul Taylor "Watty" Watson (March 16, 1952 – November 20, 2024) was an American cornetist, guitarist, trumpet player, singer, composer, and songwriter who lived in Richmond, Virginia.

== Life and career ==
Watson was born in Monkey's Eyebrow, Kentucky on March 16, 1952. He is best known for his work with Orthotonics, FSK, Sparklehorse, and Patrick Phelan.

From 2007 onward he worked frequently in New York and Europe with the band And The Wiremen, and his principal collaborator in that band, composer Lynn Wright. With Wright, he also worked regularly with the New York-based choreographer Rachel Cohen, and a wide range of improvisors and songwriters, including Pere Ubu's Tony Maimone, poet Pete Simonelli, violinist Simon Goff, singer Little Annie and her music director Paul Wallfisch, and experimental German vocalist Christiane Hommelsheim.

In 2014, he released a solo record My Secret Effect.

Watson lived in Richmond, Virginia, where he died from complications of Parkinson's disease on November 20, 2024, at the age of 72.

== Selected discography ==
- 1979 – Idio Savant – Shakers in a Tantrum Landscape
- 1981 – Alchemical Rowdies – Trans-Idio
- 1982 – Ortho-tonics – Accessible As Gravity
- 1984 – 1/2 Japanese – Our Solar System
- 1984 – Orthotonics – Wake Up You Must Remember
- 1985 – Half Japanese – Sing No Evil
- 1986 – F.A.F.O.O.T. – FA3574
- 1989 – House of Freaks – Tantilla +13
- 1990 – Half Japanese – We Are They Who Ache With Amorous Love
- 1993 – FSK – The Sound Of Music
- 1995 – Sparklehorse – London
- 1995 – Sparklehorse – Vivadixiesubmarinetransmissionplot
- 1996 – FSK – International
- 1998 – Rattlemouth – Fist Full Of Iffy
- 1998 – Sparklehorse – Good Morning Spider
- 1999 – Michael Hurley – Weatherhole
- 1999 – One Ring Zero – Tranz Party
- 2000 – The Blasco Ballroom – Film
- 2000 – Patrick Phelan – Songs Of Patrick Phelan
- 2000 – Cracker – Garage D'Or
- 2001 – Patrick Phelan – Parlor
- 2001 – A Camp – A Camp
- 2001 – Dexter Romweber – Chased By Martians
- 2001 – Griefbirds – Paper Radio
- 2002 – Cordero – Lamb Lost In The City
- 2004 – Tulsa Drone – No Wake
- 2006 – Ostinato – Chasing The Form
- 2006 – Tanakh – Ardent Fevers
- 2006 – Sarah White – White Light
- 2007 – Gachupin – Gachupin
- 2010 – And the Wiremen – And the Wiremen
- 2012 - Bee and Flower - Suspension
- 2012 - Jonathan Vassar and the Speckled Bird - Sky and Country
- 2014 - Paul Watson - My Secret Effect
- 2015 - TB Ward - LambLion
- 2015 - And The Wiremen - Send Me Low
- 2016 - And The Wiremen - Caged Bird/Mad Love (Single)
