= List of murdered musicians =

Many musicians have been murdered during their active career. Most of the musicians had been shot or stabbed to death. Some of them have received extensive media attention, including the assassination of John Lennon in 1980, the killing of Marvin Gaye in 1984, the murder of Selena in 1995, the murder of Tupac Shakur in 1996, the murder of the Notorious B.I.G. in 1997, the murder of Christina Grimmie in 2016, the murder of XXXTentacion in 2018, the murder of Pop Smoke in 2020, and the assassination of Sidhu Moose Wala in 2022. Others have received less media attention, including the murder of Bryan Harvey, who was killed during the 2006 Richmond spree murders.

For hip hop musicians see: list of murdered hip hop musicians.

== Murdered musicians ==
Below is a list of notable murders of musicians.

Name	Known as	Date of murder	Age	Site of death	Perpetrator	Method of murder	Credit	Ref.
Alessandro Stradella		25 February 1682	38	Genoa, Italy	Unknown	Stabbing	Classical composer	
Jean-Marie Leclair		22 October 1764	67	Paris, France	Unknown	Stabbing	Classical composer and violinist	
Clarence Smith	Pinetop Smith	15 March 1929	24	Chicago, Illinois, US	Unknown	Shooting	Boogie-woogie pianist	
Alejandro García Caturla		12 November 1940	34	Havana, Cuba	Unknown	Unknown	Classical composer	
Anton Webern		15 September 1945	61	Vienna, Austria	Pfc. Raymond Norwood Bell	Shooting	Classical composer	
John Williamson	Sonny Boy Williamson	1 June 1948	34	Chicago, Illinois, US	Unknown	Shooting	Blues singer	
Francis Blackwell	Scrapper Blackwell	7 October 1962	59	Indianapolis, Indiana, US	Unknown	Shooting	Blues guitarist, composer	
Marc Blitzstein		22 January 1964	58	Martinique	Three men	Beating	Classical/musical theatre composer	
Sam Cooke		11 December 1964	33	Los Angeles, California, US	Bertha Franklin	Shooting	Soul singer-songwriter	
James "Shep" Sheppard		24 January 1970	34	Long Island, New York	Unknown	Shooting	Doo-Wop singer	
Darrell Banks		24 February 1970	32	Detroit, Michigan, US	Aaron Bullock	Shooting	Soul singer	
Curtis Ousley	King Curtis	13 August 1971	37	New York City, US	Juan Montanez	Stabbing	Jazz saxophonist	
Lee Morgan		19 February 1972	33	New York City, US	Helen Morgan	Shooting	Jazz trumpeter	
Víctor Lidio Jara Martínez	Víctor Jara	16 September 1973	40	Santiago, Chile	Chilean military officers	Shooting and torture	Singer-songwriter	
David Akeman	Stringbean	10 November 1973	58	Ridgetop, Tennessee, US	John A. Brown and Marvin Douglas Brown	Shooting	Country banjo player	
Al Jackson Jr.		1 October 1975	39	Memphis, Tennessee, US	Unknown	Shooting	R&B, funk and soul drummer	
Eddie Jefferson		9 May 1979	60	Detroit, Michigan, US	Unknown	Shooting	Vocalese	
Jannie Pought		September 1980	34	New Jersey, US	Unknown	Stabbing	R&B singer	
John Lennon		8 December 1980	40	New York City, US	Mark David Chapman	Shooting	Rock and pop artist	
Rusty Day		3 June 1982	36	Longwood, Florida, US	Unknown	Shooting	Rock Singer	
Claude Vivier		7 March 1983	34	Paris, France	Pascal Dolzan	Stabbing	Classical composer	
Felix Pappalardi		17 April 1983	43	New York City, US	Gail Pappalardi	Shooting	Rock artist	
Prince Far I	King Cry Cry	15 September 1983	39	Kingston, Jamaica	Unknown	Shooting	Reggae vocalist/producer	
Hugh Mundell		14 October 1983	21	Kingston, Jamaica	Ricardo Codrington	Shooting	Reggae singer	
Walter Notheis Jr.	Walter Scott	27 December 1983	40	St. Peters, Missouri, US	James H. Williams Sr.	Shooting	Rock and roll singer	
Marvin Gaye		1 April 1984	44	Los Angeles, California, US	Marvin Gay Sr.	Shooting	R&B singer	
Lenny Breau		12 August 1984	43	Los Angeles, California, US	Unknown	Strangling	Guitarist	
Carly Barrett		17 April 1987	36	Kingston, Jamaica	Glenroy Carter and Junior Neil	Shooting	Reggae drummer	
Gary Driscoll		8 June 1987	41	Ithaca, New York, U.S.	Unknown	Shooting	Drummer	
Winston Hubert McIntosh	Peter Tosh	11 September 1987	42	Kingston, Jamaica	Dennis Lobban and two other individuals	Shooting and torture	Reggae artist	
John Pastorius III	Jaco Pastorius	21 September 1987	35	Fort Lauderdale, Florida, US	Luc Havan	Beaten (barfight), brain hemorrhage	Jazz bassist	
Amar Singh Chamkila	Chamkila	8 March 1988	27	Mehsampur, Punjab, India	Unknown	Shooting	Punjabi singer	
Michael David Fuller	Blaze Foley	1 February 1989	39	Austin, Texas, US	Carey January	Shooting	Country, folk singer-songwriter	
Osbourne Ruddock	King Tubby	6 February 1989	48	Kingston, Jamaica	Unknown	Shooting	Reggae sound engineer	
Belgin Sarılmışer	Bergen	14 August 1989	31	Pozantı, Turkey	Halis Serbest	Shooting	Arabseque Singer, actress	
Cornell Gunter		26 February 1990	53	Las Vegas, Nevada, US	Unknown	Shooting	R&B singer	
Andrzej Zaucha		10 October 1991	42	Kraków, Poland	Yves Goulais	Shooting	R&B singer, saxophonist	
Chris Bender		3 November 1991	19	Brockton, Massachusetts, US	Eroy Kindell	Shooting	R&B singer	
Dave Rowbotham		8 November 1991	33	Manchester, England	Unknown	Bludgeoning with hammer	Rock musician	
Rosalino Sánchez Félix	Chalino Sanchez	16 May 1992	31	Culiacán, Mexico	Unknown	Shooting	Narcocorrido singer	
Willie Irving Gaston Junior	Heavy One	29 September 1992	24	Eaton Road, Barry Farms, Southeast DC, US	Unknown	Shooting	Bassist and drummer of the Junk Yard Band	
Mia Zapata		7 July 1993	27	Seattle, Washington, US	Jesus Mezquia	Strangling	Rock singer	
Don Myrick		30 July 1993	53	Los Angeles, California, US	Police Officer Gary Barbaro	Shooting	Jazz saxophonist	
Øystein Aarseth	Euronymous	10 August 1993	25	Oslo, Norway	Varg Vikernes	Stabbing	Black metal guitarist	
Rhett Forrester		22 January 1994	37	Atlanta, Georgia, US	Unknown	Shooting	Heavy metal musician	
Hasni Chakroun	Cheb Hasni	29 September 1994	26	Oran, Algeria	Armed Islamic Group of Algeria	Shooting	Raï singer	
Selena Quintanilla-Pérez	Selena	31 March 1995	23	Corpus Christi, Texas, US	Yolanda Saldívar	Shooting	Tejano singer	
Tupac Shakur	Tupac; 2Pac; Makaveli	13 September 1996	25	Las Vegas, Nevada, US	Orlando Anderson (suspected)	Shooting	Rapper	
Christopher Wallace	The Notorious B.I.G.; Biggie Smalls; Frank White	9 March 1997	24	Los Angeles, California, US	Wardell "Poochie" Fouse (suspected)	Shooting	Rapper	
Gulshan Kumar		12 August 1997	46	Mumbai, Maharashtra, India	Unknown	Shooting	Bhajan singer	
Lounès Matoub		25 June 1998	42	Aït Aissi, Tizi Ouzou, Algeria	Armed Islamic Group of Algeria	Shooting	Kabyle music singer	
James "Jimmy" Ellis	Orion	12 December 1998	53	Orrville, Alabama, US	Jeffery Lee	Shooting	Rock singer	
Jaki Byard		11 February 1999	76	New York City, US	Unknown	Shooting	Jazz pianist	
Roger Troutman		25 April 1999	47	Dayton, Ohio, US	Larry Troutman	Shooting	Funk musician	
John Whitehead		11 May 2004	55	Philadelphia, Pennsylvania, US	Two unknown men	Shooting	R&B singer	
Darrell Abbott	Dimebag Darrell; Diamond Darrell	8 December 2004	38	Columbus, Ohio, US	Nathan Gale	Shooting	Heavy metal guitarist	
Bryan Harvey		1 January 2006	49	Richmond, Virginia, US	Ray Joseph Dandridge and Ricky Javon Gray	Blunt-force trauma	Folk rock singer/guitarist	
Valentín Elizalde		25 November 2006	27	Reynosa, Mexico	Unknown	Shooting	Banda singer	
Winston Riley		19 January 2012	68	Kingston, Jamaica	Unknown	Shooting	Rocksteady/reggae singer and producer	
Natalia Strelchenko	Natalia Strelle	30 August 2015	38	Manchester, England	John Martin	Head trauma, strangulation	Classical pianist	
Christina Grimmie		10 June 2016	22	Orlando, Florida, US	Kevin James Loibl	Shooting	Pop singer	
Amjad Sabri		22 June 2016	39	Karachi, Pakistan	Pakistani Taliban	Shooting	Qawwali singer	
Jahseh Onfroy	XXXTentacion	18 June 2018	20	Deerfield Beach, Florida, US	Four men indicted	Shooting	Rapper and singer	
Bashar Jackson	Pop Smoke	19 February 2020	20	Hollywood Hills, Los Angeles, California, US	Three men and two minors indicted	Shooting	Rapper	
Andrea Meyer	Nebelhexe	13 October 2021	52	Kongsberg, Norway	Espen Andersen Bråthen	Stabbing	Rock and electronic singer	
Shubhdeep Singh Sidhu	Sidhu Moose Wala	29 May 2022	28	Mansa, Punjab, India	Unknown	Shooting	Rapper and singer	
Rakim Allen	PnB Rock	12 September 2022	30	Los Angeles, California, US	Two men and one minor indicted	Shooting	Rapper and singer	
Yurii Kerpatenko		16 October 2022	46	Kherson Oblast, Ukraine	Russian soldiers	Shooting	Classical conductor, accordionist	
Ian Watkins		11 October 2025	48	HM Prison Wakefield, West Yorkshire, England	Two men indicted	Stabbing	Rock singer and convicted pedophile	
Talay Riley		5 June 2026	35	Silvertown, London, England	Three men indicted	Stabbing	R&B singer	

== See also ==
- List of murdered hip hop musicians
- List of deaths in popular music
- List of musicians who died of drug overdose
- 27 Club
- Curse of the ninth
