= Sol Seppy =

- Born: Sophie Michalitsianos; 31 December 1980 (age 45); Wimbledon, London, England
- Occupations: Singer; songwriter; businesswoman; record producer
- Years active: 2006–present
- Spouse: Scott Minor (married 2018–present)
- Partner: Alton Delano (2012)
- Children: 1
- Musical career
- Genres: Downtempo
- Labels: Grönland Records; Rough Trade Records
- Website: sol-seppy.bandcamp.com

Sol Seppy is the stage name of Sophie Michalitsianos (born 31 December 1980), an English singer, songwriter and musician.

== Early life ==
Michalitsianos was born in Wimbledon, England and grew up in Australia and Greece. Her father is of Greek and French heritage with her mother being Australian and English. After studying piano and cello, she studied contemporary composition and orchestra at the Sydney Conservatorium of Music.

== Career ==
At the age of 23, Michalitsianos moved to the United States at the invitation of Mark Linkous, where she performed on the albums Good Morning Spider and It's a Wonderful Life by his indie rock band Sparklehorse. After her time with Sparklehorse, Michalitsianos moved to Upstate New York, where she set up her own studio. Though the studio and almost all her compositions were destroyed in an explosion, Michalitsianos herself was not harmed.

On 10 April 2006 she released her debut album The Bells of 1 2 on Grönland Records/Rough Trade. Michalitsianos wrote, sang, played, and produced all 12 tracks on the album herself, with additional production and mixing by Alton Delano Brammer and Paul Antonel. The track "Enter One" was featured in several films and TV shows: Standoff, Son of a Gun, Dark (season 1, episode 6), Final Space (season 1, episode 6), 9-1-1: Lone Star (season 3, episode 2) and Ideal (season 4, episode 8).
On 1 March 2012 the EP The Bird Calls, and Its Song Awakens the Air, and I Call was released first on iTunes and later also in FLAC format. The EP is no longer available on Grönland Records but only as an online download. The songs that were released on the EP are now available on her album I Am As You Are, Pt 1, released 28 February 2020.

The single The Alaska Wilds was released 8 October 2025.

== Personal life ==
Michalitsianos now lives in Greece having previously lived in the United States in New York and Knoxville and England, UK. She is married to Scott Minor. Discussing the death of her former partner and becoming a parent she told Phoenix Magazine: “It was difficult, I had a daughter and I was in a country I wasn’t used to being in, everything was quite rough.”

== Discography ==
=== Albums ===
- 2006: The Bells of 1 2
- 2012 EP " A Bird Calls, and Its Song Awakens the Air and I Call
- 2019: I.A.A.Y.A Part One

=== Singles ===
- 2006: "Move"
- 2006: "Slo Fuzz"
- 2006: "Supermarket Sweep"
- 2012: A Bird Calls and Its Song Awakens the Air, and I Call
- 2024: "You Want it All"
- 2025: "The Alaska Wilds"
