= Cakewalk (album) =

Studio album by House of Freaks
- Released: 1991
- Genre: Alternative rock
- Label: Giant
- Producer: Dennis Herring

House of Freaks chronology
Tantilla (1989)	Cakewalk (1991)	Invisible Jewel (1994)

Singles from Cakewalk
- 1. "Rocking Chair" Released: 1991

Cakewalk is an album by the American musical duo House of Freaks, released in 1991. It was the duo's first album for a major label.

"Rocking Chair" peaked at No. 11 on Billboard's Modern Rock Tracks chart. The album was a commercial disappointment.

== Production ==
The album was produced by Dennis Herring. The duo brought in Bob Rupe, of the Silos, to play bass; Mark Linkous also contributed to the recording. Johnny Hott sang his first lead vocal on "My House".

The former Long Ryders guitar player Stephen McCarthy joined the band for the tour in support of the album.

== Critical reception ==
Professional ratings
Review scores
Source	Rating
AllMusic	3/5 stars
Chicago Tribune	3.5/4 stars
The Encyclopedia of Popular Music	3/5 stars
Entertainment Weekly	B+

The Indianapolis Star wrote that "Bryan Harvey's guitar glides while Johnny Hott seems to have just found his drums in the garage, infusing hyperactive beats and even pounding on garbage can lids." Trouser Press determined that "the diverse, often busy (but occasionally spare, as in the offhand acoustics of 'Magpie Wing') arrangements could have dandified even plain material, but the pair’s writing, notwithstanding a lyrical shift to more personal reflections, is right on track." Entertainment Weekly called Cakewalk a "strikingly nuanced, pristinely produced" album.

The Washington Post thought that "the lyrics still have a Southern gothic quality, but they've lost their literary density and better resemble the country and blues sources Harvey draws on." The Milwaukee Sentinel deemed the album "lively and occasionally even rowdy, but it's also a mature piece of work that draws gently on the roots of everyday life in a Southern town." The Chicago Tribune concluded that "an off-handed charm pervades Cakewalk, which has a similar feel to Paul McCartney's first solo album but skirts overbearing preciousness."

The Calgary Herald included Cakewalk on its list of the 20 best albums of 1991; The Morning Call considered it one of the year's 16 best, while the Milwaukee Sentinel considered it one of the 10 best.

AllMusic wrote that "the charming, Jules Shear-like 'Honor Among Lovers' and the Waitsian drinking song 'Remember Me Well' stand out."

== Track listing ==
No.	Title	Length
1.	"..."
2.	"Rocking Chair"
3.	"I Got Happy"
4.	"I Confess"
5.	"Hymn"
6.	"A Good Man"
7.	"Magpie Wing"
8.	"Cakewalk"
9.	"This Is It"
10.	"Honor Among Lovers"
11.	"My House"
12.	"Ants"
13.	"Never"
14.	"Remember Me Well"
