= Bird Machine =

Studio album by Sparklehorse
- Released: September 8, 2023
- Recorded: 2009
- Studios: Electrical Audio, Chicago, Illinois, United States; Montrose Recording; Static King, Hayesville, North Carolina, United States
- Length: 43:49
- Label: Anti-
- Producers: Matt Linkous; Melissa Moore Linkous; Alan Weatherhead

Sparklehorse chronology
Dark Night of the Soul (2010)	Bird Machine (2023)

"Some of it was done. Some of it was close. And anything that we added was intended to enhance it, not to embellish it. We wanted to bring out what was there."

— Matt Linkous on finishing the music of his brother Mark for Bird Machine

Bird Machine is the fifth and final studio album from American indie rock band Sparklehorse, released on September 8, 2023 by Anti-. The album was mostly recorded before the 2010 death of bandleader Mark Linkous, and has received acclaim from critics.

== Recording and release ==
The music for Bird Machine was recorded by Sparklehorse prior to Mark Linkous' 2010 suicide. Linkous' brother Matt oversaw unreleased music and found the track "It Will Never Stop" in 2022. In June 2023, the full album was announced, made up of older recordings, with additions made by Matt and Melissa Linkous, based on the kinds of musical contributions they had made to prior Sparklehorse recordings.

The initial tracks were recorded with Steve Albini and were intended to be the band's fifth studio album prior to collaborating with Danger Mouse for Dark Night of the Soul. "Scull of Lucia" was previewed on July 11.

== Reception ==
Professional ratings
Aggregate scores
Source	Rating
AnyDecentMusic?	7.8/10
Metacritic	86/100
Review scores
Source	Rating
AllMusic	4.5/5 stars
Beats Per Minute	82%
The Line of Best Fit	8/10
Mojo	4/5 stars
MusicOMH	4/5 stars
Pitchfork	7.6/10
The Skinny	4/5 stars
Sputnikmusic	4.2/5
Uncut	4/5 stars
Under the Radar	7.5/10

According to the review aggregator Metacritic, Bird Machine received "universal acclaim" based on a weighted average score of 86 out of 100 from 12 critic scores. AllMusic critic Heather Phares wrote that "the chance to connect with his music for the first time once again is something like a miracle" and continued that "listening to Bird Machine is a heartbreaking, uplifting experience—in other words, a perfect tribute to the way he moved so many people". Bill Pearis of BrooklynVegan shortlisted Bird Machine as one of the best albums of September 2023, calling it "an instant classic we had to wait 13 years to hear". In Glide Magazine, Ryan Dillon stated that "Bird Machine guides you through exactly why Sparklehorse will never be forgotten, intensely dark emotions are put to free-falling melodies and set to the distorted textures that make a record undeniably Linkous" and the release puts "a stunningly beautiful bow on the Sparklehorse discography while being so distinctive and magically stirring, they stand in a spotlight all to their own". Writing for The Line of Best Fit, John Amen commented that "Linkous's lyrical dexterity, emotional depth, and gift for dark-pop hooks are once again on glorious display. He concluded that "Bird Machine is a resonant final word from an enormously talented singer-songwriter". Writing for Louder Than War, Tim Cooper characterized the release as "a familiar blend of the fragile and the furious" that is more than outtakes and unfinished work that is "unmistakably a Sparklehorse album from the moment it begins" that is "packed with hummable tunes". Writing for MusicOMH, John Murphy stated that it "sounds like a fully fledged album" and "a record of off-kilter alt-rock with the unique voice of [Mark] Linkous adding an added emotional edge, knowing as we do, that's he effectively singing from the grave".

In The New Zealand Herald, critic Peter Baker shortlisted Bird Machine on music that readers needed to listen to that week and called it "an essential addition to [Mark Linkous'] legacy". Sam Sodomsky of Pitchfork called it "a bittersweet cocktail of beauty and torment" and noting how Mark Linkous could combine contradictory emotions in his music. In The Skinny, Tony Inglis stated that "rarely has a posthumous release felt so emotionally fitting, so lovingly rendered", continuing that Linkous' "oft-praised skill of managing to wrench childlike wonder from the depths of pain and self-flagellation runs across this set". Sunnyvale of Sputnikmusic called it "a godsend" and "a comparatively straightforward set of tunes, wrapped into the most concise runtime ever for a Sparklehorse release". In Uncut, Jason Anderson wrote that this release "demonstrates no diminishment of confidence" and that the work "strongly suggests [that Mark Linkous] remained the same restlessly inventive artist that he'd been" in his early career. In Under the Radar, Ian Rushbury characterized it as "a strong album and never sounds as if it's been pieced together posthumously".

Editors at AllMusic included this on their list of favorite alternative and indie albums of 2023. This was included in the 40 best independent albums of 2023 in BrooklynVegan's Indie Basement. Andrew Dansby of the Houston Chronicle included this among the 10 best alternative albums of 2023.

== Track listing ==
All tracks are written by Mark Linkous, except where noted.

1. "It Will Never Stop" – 1:50
2. "Kind Ghosts" – 2:52
3. "Evening Star Supercharger" – 3:46
4. "O Child" – 4:20
5. "Falling Down" – 3:34
6. "I Fucked It Up" – 1:42
7. "Hello Lord" – 4:08
8. "Daddy's Gone" (Linkous, Brian Burton) – 2:49
9. "Chaos of the Universe" – 3:58
10. "Listening to the Higsons" (Robyn Hitchcock) – 3:01
11. "Everybody's Gone to Sleep" – 4:31
12. "The Scull of Lucia" – 4:11
13. "Blue" – 1:24
14. "Stay" – 1:41

== Personnel ==
Musicians

- Mark Linkous – vocals (tracks 1–12, 14), guitar (1–3, 5–14), keyboards (1, 2, 9), drums (1, 2), bass (1), Speak & Spell (2), SK-1 (3, 14), all instruments (4), "pling plong" (12)
- Paul Dillon – bass (3, 5, 6, 8–12, 14), guitar (11)
- Matt Linkous – guitar (3, 5, 9, 11, 12), table beat (7), drum machine (12)
- Spencer Linkous – vocals (3, 5, 8, 9, 11), answering machine (4)
- Jason Lytle – vocals (11, 12)
- Stephen McCarthy – toy piano (3, 8), pedal steel (5, 7, 14), guitar (8)
- Scott Minor – electronics (2, 12), Mellotron (3, 5, 11), keyboards (6, 9, 14); Reaktor, arpeggiator (8); omnichord (10)
- Melissa Moore Linkous – vocals (3, 8, 9, 11), violin (3)
- Andrea Morici – piano (3, 5, 8, 11, 12), Wurlitzer (6, 9, 10, 14), vocals (10), celeste (12)
- Steven Nistor – drums (3, 5, 6, 8–11), Wurlitzer (8), Mellotron (12), piano (14)
- Alan Weatherhead – guitar (1, 6, 9), Mellotron (2, 3, 5, 8, 11), Wurlitzer (3), ARP (5), bass (7), keyboards (7, 9), baritone guitar (7, 8); Optigan, harmonium (12)

Other personnel

- Steve Albini – recording (3, 5, 6, 8–12, 14)
- Greg Calbi – mastering
- Steve Fallone – mastering
- Joel Hamilton – mixing
- Mark Linkous – recording (1, 2, 4, 7, 13), artwork
- Matt Linkous – production (all tracks), recording (3, 5, 6, 8–12, 14)
- Melissa Moore Linkous – production
- Alan Weatherhead – production (all tracks), recording (3, 5, 6, 8–12, 14)

== Chart performance ==
Chart performance for Bird Machine
Chart	Peak Position
French Albums (SNEP)	173
Scottish Albums (Official Charts)	10
UK Albums Sales (Official Charts)	27
UK Independent Albums (Official Charts)	7

== See also ==
- 2023 in American music
- List of 2023 albums
