= All My Friends =

All My Friends may refer to:

- All My Friends (EP), a 1989 EP by House of Freaks
- "All My Friends" (LCD Soundsystem song), 2007
- "All My Friends" (Madeon song), 2019
- "All My Friends" (Owl City song), 2017
- "All My Friends" (Snakehips song), 2015
- "All My Friends", a song by 21 Savage from I Am Greater than I Was
- "All My Friends", a song by Broken Social Scene from EP to Be You and Me
- "All My Friends", a song by Counting Crows from This Desert Life
- "All My Friends", a song by Dermot Kennedy from Without Fear (album)
- "All My Friends", a song by Frenship, 2021
- "All My Friends", a song by Jacob Sartorius from The Last Text EP
- ”All My Friends”, a song by AJ Mitchell, 2019
- "All My Friends", a song by Our Lady Peace from Spiritual Machines
- "All My Friends", a song by Pavement from Crooked Rain, Crooked Rain: LA's Desert Origins
- "All My Friends", a song by The Revivalists, 2018
- "All My Friends", A song by LCD Soundsystem from the album Sound of Silver (2007)

== See also ==
- All My Friends Part 2, a 1982 Italian comedy film
