= House of Freaks =

Two-man indie rock band in the 1980s

Bryan Harvey playing as part of House of Freaks at LA's Club Lingerie, circa 1988.

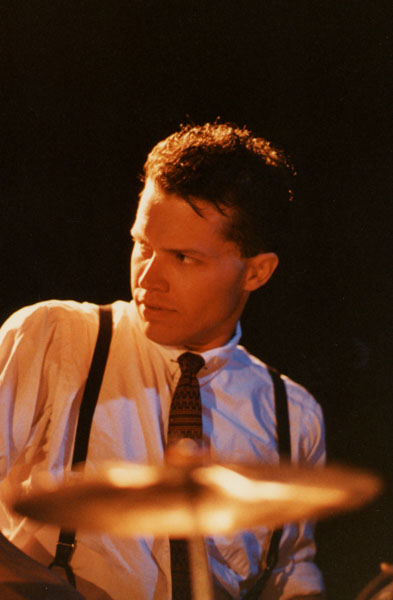
Johnny Hott playing as part of House of Freaks at LA's Club Lingerie, circa 1988.

House of Freaks was an American two-man band formed in Richmond, Virginia in the mid-1980s. Bryan Harvey played guitar and sang, and Johnny Hott played percussion. The band managed to achieve a remarkably full sound, mostly because of Hott's inventive drumming and Harvey's confident vocals and knack of playing bass lines on his guitar (cribbed from his many years as a bass player) while simultaneously playing a melody.

The Freaks' sound was a combination of folk and rock, and drew heavily from the blues and primitive Americana music. Their lyrics focused on race, religion, and life in the South, although Harvey was also adept at writing about more personal topics (the lack of success of independent bands, his sex life and meeting the woman who would become his wife on "I Got Happy") using rich metaphors from these former topics, so that many of their songs could be interpreted in two entirely different ways. Bryan's obsession with Southern Gothic issues influenced his song writing. These sentiments can be heard in such songs as "Bottom of the Ocean" and "My Backyard" from the album Monkey on a Chain Gang; "White Folk's Blood," "Family Tree," and "Big Houses" from the album Tantilla; and he cribbed the title of the song "A Good Man" from the album Cakewalk from Flannery O'Connor.

== Career ==
Harvey and Hott moved to Los Angeles for the release of the band's first album, Monkey on a Chain Gang, which received considerable critical acclaim. However, unsatisfied with life in L.A., they moved back east, where they recorded their subsequent albums and faded from the public spotlight. On March 13, 1988, House of Freaks performed at the Fillmore in San Francisco, California with The 77s and The Alarm. Audience members included Neil Young. The band had minor radio hits with singles "When the Hammer Came Down" and "Sun Gone Down" from Tantilla and "Rocking Chair" from Cakewalk.

After the band's breakup, Harvey and Hott joined a Paisley Underground supergroup called Gutterball, headed by Steve Wynn, formerly of Dream Syndicate and also featuring Stephen McCarthy of The Long Ryders and Bob Rupe of The Silos. The group released two albums, Gutterball (1993) and Weasel (1995). Harvey co-wrote many songs on each. Hott later joined the band Cracker. Harvey has guested on a number of other artists' albums, including September 67's Lucky Shoe, two albums by Shannon Worrell (formerly of September 67), and Magnet's Shark Bait. Both Harvey and Hott assisted Mark Linkous on the debut Sparklehorse record. Bryan Harvey played in a funk band, NRG Krysys, in Richmond, Virginia with Coby Batty of The Fugs. Johnny Hott has a jazz combo with Stephen McCarthy.

In an interview for his most recent band, NRG Krysys, Harvey addressed his initial disapproval for R&B and funk music when he was growing up saying it was music for "squares", and he claimed that his band played this type of music now because he discovered he had the talent. NRG Krysys even performed at the screening of Mel Stuart's documentary Wattstax during a festival in Richmond.

On New Year's Day, 2006, after a performance with his band NRG Krysys, Bryan Harvey, his wife Kathryn, and their daughters Stella and Ruby were found brutally murdered in the basement of their Richmond home. Their killers were convicted on August 17, 2006. One was sentenced to death and the other received life in prison. Media reports said about 1,400 people turned out for a memorial service, showing how well-regarded Harvey was in his community and among fellow musicians. In an obituary, Rolling Stone noted that the House of Freaks aesthetic foreshadowed such later duos as the White Stripes and The Black Keys.

== Discography ==
=== Albums ===
- Monkey on a Chain Gang, 1987
- Tantilla, 1989
- All My Friends EP, 1989
- Cakewalk, 1991
- Invisible Jewel, 1994

Tantilla and Monkey on a Chain Gang were re-released with numerous bonus tracks in limited editions by Rhino Records in 2004.

=== Singles ===
Year	Title	Chart position	Album
Year	Title	US Modern Rock	Album
1989	"Sun Gone Down"	23	Tantilla
1989	"When the Hammer Came Down"	27	Tantilla
1991	"Rocking Chair"	11	Cakewalk

== See also ==
Harvey family murder
