= All My Friends (EP) =

EP by House of Freaks
- Released: 1989
- Genre: Rock
- Label: Rhino
- Producer: Bruce Olsen and House of Freaks

House of Freaks chronology
Monkey on a Chain Gang (1987)	All My Friends (1989)	Tantilla (1989)

Professional ratings
Review scores
Source	Rating
Allmusic	2/5 stars

All My Friends is an EP by House of Freaks released on CD (R2 70943) and 12" vinyl (R1 70943) in 1989 by Rhino Records. In 2004, these tracks were remastered and included on the reissue of the album Tantilla. Recording occurred at Floodzone Studios in Richmond, VA. The album's cover image is a collage of photos consisting of friends and acquaintances of band members Bryan Harvey and Johnny Hott. Included in the collage, above the EP's title, is a photo of Sparklehorse founder Mark Linkous, who occasionally performed with House of Freaks.

== Track listing ==
All tracks by House of Freaks

1. "Ten More Minutes To Live"
2. "This Old Town"
3. "Pass Me The Gun"
4. "You Can't Change The World Anymore"
5. "You'll Never See The Light Of Day"

== Personnel ==
- Tater Brix – Jew's-harp
- Bryan Harvey – guitar, vocals
- Johnny Hott – drums
- House of Freaks – producer
- Zip Irvin – baritone sax
- Jocko MacNelly – guitar
- Bruce Olsen – producer, engineer
- Mike Stavrou – engineer
- Paul Watson – trumpet
