= Distorted Ghost =

EP by Sparklehorse
- Released: February 1, 2000
- Genre: Alternative rock, indie rock
- Length: 19:15
- Label: Odeon/Capitol/EMI Records; 0170 4 69505 2 7 C2-69505
- Producer: Mark Linkous

Sparklehorse chronology
Good Morning, Spider (1998)	Distorted Ghost (2000)	It's a Wonderful Life (2001)

Professional ratings
Review scores
Source	Rating
AllMusic	4/5 stars
Pitchfork	4.0/10

Distorted Ghost is an EP by Sparklehorse, released in 2000. It is a collection of b-sides and live tracks.

== Critical reception ==
The Independent called the EP a "perfectly formed six-track stopgap." In its 3-star (out of 5) review, Newsweek likened it to "a more twisted R.E.M., with less heaviosity."

== Track listing ==
All tracks are written by Mark Linkous, except My Yoke Is Heavy, which was written by Daniel Johnston.

No.	Title	Length
1.	"Happy Man" (Memphis version)	3:41
2.	"Waiting for Nothing"	2:31
3.	"Happy Place"	2:17
4.	"My Yoke Is Heavy"	3:32
5.	"Gasoline Horseys" (live)	3:28
6.	"Happy Pig" (live)	4:01
Total length:		19:15

== Credits ==
"Happy Man"

- Produced & recorded by Eric Drew Feldman at Easley Memphis, and by Mark Linkous at Static King, VA
- Mixed by Jack Joseph Puig
- Mark Linkous - Voice, Guitar, Keyboard & Percussion
- Eric Drew Feldman - Bass, Organ
- Nick Vincent - Drums

"Waiting for Nothing", "Happy Place" & "My Yoke Is Heavy"

- Made by Mark Linkous at Static King, VA
- Piano sampled from "My Yoke Is Heavy" performed by Daniel Johnston

"Gasoline Horseys"

- Recorded at Fleece and Firkin, Bristol, England
- Mark Linkous - Voice, Guitar
- Sofie Michalitsianos - Sings
- Scott Minor - Walkman & Yak Bak
- Scott Fitzimmons - Bass

"Happy Pig"

- Taken from a BBC Radio 1 evening session
- Mark Linkous - Voice, Guitar & Tapes
- Scott Minor - Drums & Sampler
- Jonathan Segel - Guitar
- Scott Fitzimmons - Bass
