= Good Morning Spider =

Studio album by Sparklehorse
- Released: July 20, 1998
- Recorded: 1998
- Genres: Indie rock; alternative country; experimental pop
- Length: 53:45
- Label: Capitol
- Producer: Mark Linkous

Sparklehorse chronology
Vivadixie submarine transmissionplot (1995)	Good Morning Spider (1998)	Distorted Ghost EP (2000)

Singles from Good Morning Spider
- 1. "Painbirds"/"Maria's Little Elbows" Released: July 6, 1998; 2. "Sick of Goodbyes" Released: October 6, 1998

Good Morning Spider is the second studio album by American indie rock band Sparklehorse. It was released on July 20, 1998 by record label Capitol.

It has been well-received by music critics.

== Background ==
Following the release of their first album Vivadixiesubmarinetransmissionplot, Sparklehorse embarked on a European tour opening for Radiohead, who praised Sparklehorse as their favorite new band. It was during this tour in 1996 that Mark Linkous suffered a near-fatal overdose that would have long-lasting effects on both his physical and psychological well-being.

After mixing antidepressants and alcohol, Linkous passed out in the bathroom of his London hotel room with his legs pinned underneath him, which cut off circulation to his legs. It would be over fourteen hours before the unconscious singer was finally discovered and rushed to the hospital. When paramedics tried to straighten out his legs, Linkous suffered a heart attack and was clinically dead for three minutes before being resuscitated. A series of painful surgeries followed, along with a three-month stay at St Mary's Hospital in London.

Initially, Linkous used a wheelchair, which didn't prevent him from performing a number of concerts in 1997. Finally he was fitted with leg braces and began learning how to walk again.

In a 2001 interview, Linkous, who battled depression his entire life, admitted that he had no memory of the overdose, and he wasn't sure if it had been intentional or an accident. But five years later, he stated that he didn't believe it was intentional; it was simply the result of "being stupid with drugs". Linkous' brother told a Richmond, Virginia news outlet in 2010 that he felt it had been an accident brought on by insomnia and other health problems the songwriter was experiencing at the time. Family members noticed that Linkous' recurring bouts with depression became deeper and more prolonged following his overdose.

In the midst of his convalescence, Linkous became concerned that brain damage from his near-death experience would affect his ability to write songs again. His friend David Lowery from the band Cracker brought him a guitar, but according to Linkous, "it took me a long time to be able to make chords again".

Eventually, writing began on the songs that would become Good Morning Spider, which, Rolling Stone noted, explored themes of "frustration, resignation, wonder and gratitude" – feelings that swirled in Linkous' mind during his recovery. The album's title came from a sound that Sparklehorse singer-songwriter Mark Linkous once heard from an old pump organ that reminded him of a spider building a web. He was later told about an old folk superstition in which seeing a spider in the morning is an omen for a sad day. One of the first songs written was "Saint Mary", which was about Linkous' London hospital stay. In another song, "Pig", the songwriter vented his anger at his physical disability and the desire to have his old body back.

== Recording ==
Good Morning Spider was recorded in Linkous' 16-track home studio set up in an old farmhouse outside Richmond, Virginia that he owned. An arsenal of thrift store keyboards and discarded equipment was employed to give the album its distinctive sound. In a 1999 interview, Linkous listed some of his favorite gear:

I have a lot of cheap, little keyboards and this octagon [sic – optigan] thing and this synth module that has a zillion different sounds in it. A lot of the keyboards I got at thrift stores. I have a little Casio SK-1 that has a built in sampler. My favorite microphone I found at the landfill. It was on a CB base station. I've got these wireless intercoms from the '50s from an auction from a dentist's office.

Linkous experimented with songs and sounds on the album; the song "Chaos of the Galaxy/Happy Man" is notable for its middle section, which consists of nothing but radio static. This was done intentionally by Linkous, who not only wanted the recording to sound like an AM radio station broadcast but also feared that the song was too catchy otherwise and would end up being used by Capitol Records as a radio single. As he deadpanned to the online music blog Swizzle-Stick at the time, "'Happy Man' kind of sounds like everything on the radio. Who needs that?" Eventually, Linkous was convinced by Eric Drew Feldman to re-record a radio-friendly version of "Happy Man" without the static at Easley McCain Recording studios in Memphis, Tennessee. Easley was chosen because some of Linkous' favorite artists like Pavement, Cat Power and Guided by Voices had previously recorded there.

Vic Chesnutt was scheduled to appear on the album but couldn't make it to the sessions, so Linkous inserted Chesnutt's phone message apology into the song "Sunshine".

== Reception ==
Professional ratings
Review scores
Source	Rating
AllMusic	4.5/5 stars
Chicago Sun-Times	3/4 stars
Entertainment Weekly	A
The Guardian	4/5 stars
The List	5/5 stars
NME	9/10
Pitchfork	9.1/10
Rolling Stone	3.5/5 stars
Select	4/5
Spin	8/10

Good Morning Spider has been well-received by music critics. Stephen Thompson of The A.V. Club called it "a great record, though spotty by design, and it gets better with each successive listen."

== Track listing ==
All tracks are written by Mark Linkous, except as noted.

No.	Title	Writer(s)	Length
1.	"Pig"		2:22
2.	"Painbirds"		3:50
3.	"Saint Mary"		3:59
4.	"Good Morning Spider"	Linkous, Scott Minor, Sofia Mitchalitsianos	1:09
5.	"Sick of Goodbyes"	Linkous, David Lowery	3:32
6.	"Box of Stars (Part One)"		0:33
7.	"Sunshine"		4:59
8.	"Chaos of the Galaxy/Happy Man"		4:31
9.	"Hey, Joe"	Daniel Johnston	3:04
10.	"Come on In"		3:43
11.	"Maria's Little Elbows"		4:16
12.	"Cruel Sun"		2:25
13.	"All Night Home"		3:43
14.	"Ghost of His Smile"		3:11
15.	"Hundreds of Sparrows"		2:26
16.	"Box of Stars (Part Two)"		0:49
17.	"Junebug"		3:24

== Personnel ==
- Mark Linkous – vocals, guitar, bass, Wurlitzer, piano, optigan, sampler, vibraphone, harmonium, speak and spell, concertina, percussion, drum machine
- Sophie Michalitsianos – vocals, cello on tracks 2 to 4, 6, 7, 10 and 15 to 17
- Scott Minor – drums on tracks 1 and 15, harmonium on track 4
- Paul Watson – cornet on track 2
- Melissa Moore – violin on tracks 3, 6, 7, 10 and 16
- Johnny Hott – drums on track 8, piano on track 5
- Stephen McCarthy – pedal steel guitar on track 13
- David Lowery – guitar, drum machine on track 5, bass on track 8
- Vic Chesnutt – answering voice on track 7
