= 2006 Richmond spree murders =

2006 murder spree in Richmond, Virginia

- Booking photos of Ray Dandridge and Ricky Gray
- Location: Richmond, Virginia, U.S.
- Date: January 1–6, 2006
- Attack type: Home invasion, robbery, spree killing, mass murder, child murder, arson
- Weapons: Hammer, knife, plastic bag and duct tape
- Deaths: 7 (not including Ricky Gray's wife, whom he murdered in Pennsylvania in 2005)
- Injuries: 1
- Perpetrators: Ricky Javon Gray; Ray Joseph Dandridge; Ashley Baskerville (accomplice; later murdered by Gray and Dandridge)
- Motive: Robbery
- Verdict: Gray; Guilty on all counts Dandridge; Pleaded guilty
- Convictions: Gray; Capital murder (5 counts); Dandridge; Capital murder (3 counts)
- Sentence: Gray; Death; Dandridge; Life imprisonment without parole

The 2006 Richmond spree murders took place during a seven-day period in January 2006 in and around Richmond, Virginia, United States; seven people—four members of the Harvey family and three members of the Baskerville–Tucker family—were killed.

The perpetrators were Ricky Javon Gray (March 9, 1977 – January 18, 2017) and his nephew, Ray Joseph Dandridge (born January 24, 1977). Gray's girlfriend Ashley Baskerville assisted the pair as an accomplice until she became one of their victims as well. After their arrest, Gray and Dandridge were linked to two prior murders, including that of Gray's wife in Pennsylvania, and a near-fatal assault in late 2005.

Dandridge pleaded guilty to murdering the three Baskerville-Tucker victims in exchange for receiving a life sentence without the possibility of parole. Gray was convicted of capital murder in connection with the Harvey family murders. He was sentenced to life in prison without parole for killing the parents, and sentenced to death for killing the children. Gray was executed on January 18, 2017, at 9:42 p.m. by lethal injection. He was the second to last person to be executed in Virginia before the state abolished capital punishment in 2021.

== Crimes preceding the murder spree ==
=== Murder of Treva Gray ===
Treva Gray

On November 5, 2005, a passerby discovered the badly beaten body of 35-year-old Treva Terrell Gray in a shallow grave on Brookside Avenue in Washington, Pennsylvania, a suburb of Pittsburgh. Treva had married Ricky Javon Gray, a 28-year-old ex-convict, approximately six months before her murder, and had lived with her husband in a house owned by her family. Ray Joseph Dandridge, Ricky's nephew, had moved in with the couple following his release from prison on October 26, 2005, after serving more than ten years for armed robbery.

According to Treva's parents, the Grays fought bitterly, and claw marks were seen on Ricky's forearm on the day Treva's body was found. While both Gray and Dandridge were interviewed by Washington police, they were not considered suspects. Treva's mother, Marna Squires, alleged that the police assumed that Treva died of a drug overdose and they did not try their best to investigate her death. While the police ruled Treva's death suspicious at the time, no homicide investigation was launched until after Gray's confession in 2006.

Approximately a week after the discovery of their daughter's body, Treva's parents evicted Dandridge from their property; he then moved in with his father in West Philadelphia. On December 23, Gray moved out of the Washington residence as well to stay with his maternal grandmother in Arlington, Virginia. Dandridge left West Philadelphia to join Gray on Christmas Day 2005.

=== Attack on Ryan Carey ===
On December 31, 2005, 26-year-old Ryan Carey was attacked by two men he later identified as Gray and Dandridge in front of his parents' home on the 5100 block of North 25th Street in Arlington. Carey sustained extensive beating and stab wounds to the chest, neck and arms in a near-fatal assault, and spent the next two weeks in a coma. He also permanently lost the use of his right arm.

== Murder spree ==
=== Harvey family ===
The Harvey family: left to right, Ruby, Stella, Kathryn, and Bryan

In the early afternoon of January 1, 2006, the bodies of Kathryn, Bryan, Stella, and Ruby Harvey were found dead in the basement of their burning house in the Woodland Heights district of Richmond, Virginia. The family of four had been bound with electrical cord and tape, beaten with a claw hammer, and finally had their throats slit.

Kathryn Elizabeth "Kathy" Harvey (née Grabinsky; November 28, 1966 – January 1, 2006), aged 39, was the co-owner of a popular local toy store called World of Mirth in Richmond's Carytown district and was the half-sister of actor Steven Culp. Her husband, Bryan Taber Harvey (April 27, 1956 – January 1, 2006), aged 49, was the lead singer/guitarist of House of Freaks, a two-man college rock band. Their daughters Stella Ann (November 3, 1996 – January 1, 2006) and Ruby May (July 4, 2001 – January 1, 2006) were aged 9 and 4, respectively.

Gray bound Kathryn, Bryan, and Ruby in their basement with packing tape, while Dandridge searched the house for items to steal. As this was occurring, Stella arrived home from a friend's house. Gray briefly unbound Kathryn so she could retrieve Stella from upstairs. The mother of Stella's friend, Kiersten Perkinson, had a short exchange with Kathryn where Perkinson had described her as "pale and ashen". Kathryn did not indicate to Perkinson that there was anything amiss before she left. Kathryn and Stella were rebound by Gray in the basement shortly afterward. Gray ended up cutting the throats of all four of the family members and then hitting each in the head multiple times with a claw hammer shortly thereafter. The official cause of death stated that Bryan and Kathryn died of blunt-force trauma to the head, Stella of smoke inhalation and blunt-force trauma to the head, and Ruby of stab wounds to her back, one of which punctured her lung.

Gray and Dandridge tipped over an art easel in the Harvey family's basement, poured wine over the top of it, and lit the easel on fire in an attempt to destroy the crime scene. Johnny Hott, Bryan's friend who was the drummer in House of Freaks, called 9-1-1 after noticing that the Harvey house had been set on fire.

=== Chesterfield home invasion ===
On January 3, 2006, Brenda Dale Mason and Roy Mason, a couple living on Hollywood Drive in Chesterfield County, Virginia, were robbed by two men and a woman who had gained entry to their house by pretending to ask for directions. The robbers stole several items, including a computer and a television, as well as $800 in cash. Roy Mason was able to dissuade the gang from tying them up by drawing attention to his wife's disability and his need to assist her. Neither was injured.

=== The Baskerville-Tucker family ===
Top: Mary Baskerville-Tucker and Percyell Tucker; Bottom: Ashley Baskerville, who was Gray and Dandridge's accomplice and eventual victim

On January 6, 2006, the police received a call from a Chesterfield resident who was concerned about her daughter's friend, 21-year-old Ashley Baskerville. The caller suspected that Gray and Dandridge, her former houseguests and former and current boyfriends of Ashley, were involved in the Harvey murders. The police found items at the Chesterfield home linked to the Harvey case, and stormed the house on East Broad Rock Road where Ashley lived with her mother, 46-year-old Mary Baskerville-Tucker, and her stepfather, 55-year-old Percyell Tucker. Percyell worked as a forklift driver and Mary was employed at a dry cleaning establishment. All three members of the Baskerville-Tucker family were found dead, gagged and bound with tape in their ransacked house. Percyell and Mary had been slashed across the throat. The three had suffocated due to the layers of duct tape wrapped around their heads. Ashley had a plastic bag wrapped around her head as well, secured with duct tape.

== Arrest and confessions ==
On the morning of January 7, 2006, Gray and Dandridge were arrested in Philadelphia, where Dandridge's father Ronald Wilson lived. Approximately one hour after the arrest, Dandridge confessed to killing the Tuckers and Ashley Baskerville. Twelve hours after the arrest, Gray asked to speak with a detective, then proceeded to provide a detailed, three-page confession in which he described using a kitchen knife and claw hammer to kill the Harveys, stating "I don't believe sorry is strong enough. None of this was necessary." In subsequent confessions, he admitted to beating his wife Treva to death while Dandridge held her down, to being an accomplice in the Tucker-Baskerville murders, and to the attack on Ryan Carey.

On January 8, 2006, the police formally identified Ashley Baskerville as a participant in the Harvey murders, the Chesterfield robbery, and the robbery at her own home; this came as a result of the above confessions as well as eyewitness testimony and other evidence. Baskerville had acted as the lookout in the parked car while Gray and Dandridge entered the Harvey home, and she was found wearing Bryan Harvey's wedding band. Gray and Dandridge testified that Baskerville had posed as a victim and allowed herself to be bound as a part of the plan to rob her mother and stepfather, but "things just went wrong" and Gray "got tired of the girl, so he decided to kill her and take her parents' car".

== Court proceedings ==
Both Gray and Dandridge were prosecuted in the City of Richmond Circuit Court in Virginia. On February 9, 2006, Gray was charged with five counts of capital murder in the Harvey killings: one charge for killing more than once in a three-year period, one charge for committing more than one killing in a single act, one charge for killing in commission of a robbery, and two charges for killing a child under 14 years of age. On the same day, Dandridge was charged with three counts of capital murder in the Tucker-Baskerville killings; the third count was later amended to include Dandridge's role in the Harvey killings.

Dandridge initially pleaded not guilty and was tried in September 2006, but prior to closing arguments, he changed his plea to guilty on the three counts of capital murder as part of an agreement to receive a sentence of life in prison without parole.

Gray pleaded not guilty, and his defense team sought leniency by presenting evidence of physical and sexual abuse during childhood as well as PCP use during the commission of the crimes. In August 2006, a jury found Gray guilty on five capital murder charges after four days of trial and 30 minutes of deliberation. The jury recommended that Gray receive the death penalty for the murders of Stella and Ruby Harvey, and life in prison for the three remaining charges. On October 23, 2006, Gray was sentenced to death.

In December 2006, Culpeper County also indicted Gray for the murder of Sheryl Warner, a 37-year-old legal secretary and mother of three, found shot and hanged by an electrical cord in the basement of her burning house in the town of Reva. Gray pleaded not guilty. On June 4, 2008, the charge was suspended due to contradictory evidence.

Between May 2011 and November 2015, Gray's execution was set and then stayed pending his various appeals in commonwealth and federal courts. In November 2015, a panel of the Fourth Circuit rejected Gray's appeal to that court. On January 19, 2016, Gray's execution was set for March 16, 2016, but was stayed again to allow Gray to appeal to the US Supreme Court.

In 2016, the U.S. Supreme Court declined to hear Gray's case. In November 2016, Gray was scheduled to be executed on January 18, 2017. His clemency plea was denied by governor Terry McAuliffe, and his lawyers filed an emergency appeal with the Supreme Court. He was executed on January 18, 2017, at Greensville Correctional Center at 9:42 PM EST. Dandridge was incarcerated at the Sussex II State Prison.

== Memorials ==
- The Bryan and Kathryn Harvey Family Memorial Endowment has been created "to provide music, visual art, and performing arts enrichment in the Richmond area, which may include but is not limited to educational scholarships".
- An annual event, Ruby's Run, has been organized to raise money in Ruby Harvey's name for a scholarship fund at Ruby's preschool, the Second Presbyterian Child Care Center in downtown Richmond. The first took place on Saturday, November 4, 2006; the second was on Saturday, November 17, 2007; the third was Sunday, November 9, 2008, and the fourth was November 8, 2009.
- In June 2006, the William Fox Elementary School in Richmond, where Stella Harvey attended school, dedicated its new Children's Garden to the memory of Stella Harvey.
- In January 2007, a Richmond newspaper named the Harvey Family the 2006 Richmonders of the Year.
- The American alternative country group Drive-By Truckers dedicated the song "Two Daughters and a Beautiful Wife" from their 2008 album, Brighter Than Creation's Dark, to the Harvey family. Band member Patterson Hood stated he wrote the song in reaction to the death of Bryan Harvey and his family.
- The Christian metal band Demon Hunter dedicated the song "The Last One Alive" from their 2014 album Extremist to the memories of the Richmond murders, including the Harvey family.
- The City of Richmond dedicated a newly completed footbridge in Forest Hill Park to the memory of the Harvey family on September 19, 2010, naming it The Harvey Family Memorial Bridge. Community organization Friends of Forest Hill Park first proposed that the new bridge be designated as a memorial, and raised money to place a stone marker with a plaque nearby.

== See also ==
- Capital punishment in Virginia
- List of people executed in Virginia
- List of people executed in the United States in 2017
- List of serial killers in the United States

Executions carried out in Virginia
Preceded by Alfredo Prieto October 1, 2015	Ricky Javon Gray; January 18, 2017	Succeeded by William Morva July 6, 2017
Executions carried out in the United States
Preceded by Christopher Wilkins – Texas January 11, 2017	Ricky Javon Gray – Virginia; January 18, 2017	Succeeded by Terry Edwards – Texas January 26, 2017
