= Tantilla (disambiguation) =

Tantilla may refer to:

- Tantilla, a genus of snakes
- Tantilla (album), a 1989 album by the House of Freaks
- Tantilla, a brand name of front-action switchblade knife made by Pro-Tech Knives
