= Phil Trumbo =

American graphic designer

- Occupations: Art director, graphic designer, and film director

Phil Trumbo is an American art director, graphic designer, and film director. He is professor and department chair of digital gaming and media at the Kirkland Campus of Lake Washington Institute of Technology and is the creator of multiple video games.

== Education and teaching ==
Phil Trumbo has a Bachelor of Fine Arts degree from Virginia Commonwealth University and studied Classical Animation, Storyboard and Anatomy at the American Animation Institute in Hollywood, California. Trumbo has exhibited and lectured at the American Film Institute, Antioch University in London, Game Developers Conference, Siggraff, UNICEF in Paris, University of Brighton in England, and the University of Washington. He taught art and animation at Digipen Institute of Technology and Virginia Commonwealth University.

== Biography ==
According to artist Stephen Hickman, Virginia Commonwealth University in Richmond was "a bohemian paradise in the late sixties." In January 1983, Trumbo and Steve Segal set up a spaceship set to prepare for filming actress Mary Copeland and actor/animator Jim Jinkins. The four worked for a week on a project for MTV filming 10-second scenes for possible use as ID spots. When bass guitarist Trumbo joined the experimental jazz and improvisational performance group Orthotonics in 1979 in Richmond, Virginia, they began incorporating his art and released three albums before breaking up in 1989.

During his time living in Richmond, Trumbo contributed to the comic tabloid Fan Free Funnies along with artists Bill Nelson and Charles Vess. In 1982 an illustration by Trumbo appeared in Heavy Metal Magazine. Trumbo and Steve Segal's 1984 short film Futuropolis was shown at the Biograph Theatre in Richmond and was later made available on YouTube.

F. T. Rea, also a contributor to Fan Free Funnies, was a manager of the Biograph Theatre in Richmond and has written that "In the Fan, in the early-1970s, there was a group of young, mostly VCU-trained artists, who created paintings and prints in a style that owed much to old animated cartoons. Some of them were also making short films in Super 8 and 16mm and hung out at the Biograph." Rea adds, "Due to his well-honed talent for drawing cartoons, the most obvious of this pack was Phil Trumbo." Rea quotes Trumbo 's statement that "We were all influenced by the amazing work of sixties underground cartoonists . . . like Robert Crumb, Rick Griffith, S. Clay Wilson and Trina Robbins."

Trumbo has worked as a storyboarder, comic artist, animation director, FX editor and creative director in multiple productions. He worked as part of a group hired to create the children's television show Pee-Wee's Playhouse and directed the lead-in. He won the Daytime Emmy Award for Outstanding Achievement in Main Title and Graphic Design. Other awards included Forbes magazine Stevie Award for best creative team, Deloitte & Touche Fast 50 Award for fastest growing businesses for Amaze Entertainment, three Clio Award Nominations for animation, direction and special effects in animated commercials, and Critic's Choice Award at the New York International Independent Film and Video Festival.

In 1991, Trumbo was the designer of 13 episodes and storyboard artist for two episodes of the TV series Doug. In 1995 he was art director of the video game Izzy's Quest for Olympic Rings. In 2002 he was visual effects supervisor for the short comedy film Titanic II, and in 2003 he was creative director of the video game Disney's Brother Bear.
