= Dreamt for Light Years in the Belly of a Mountain =

Studio album by Sparklehorse
- Released: September 25, 2006
- Recorded: 2001–2006
- Genres: Indie rock; alternative rock
- Length: 53:14
- Labels: Astralwerks; Caroline; Virgin; EMI Records
- Producers: Mark Linkous; Danger Mouse

Sparklehorse chronology
It's a Wonderful Life (2001)	Dreamt for Light Years in the Belly of a Mountain (2006)	In the Fishtank 15 (2009)

Dreamt for Light Years in the Belly of a Mountain is the fourth studio album by Sparklehorse released on September 25, 2006 by Astralwerks Records. It was founding member Mark Linkous' final album to be released during his lifetime before his death in 2010.

== Recording ==
After the release of 2001's It's a Wonderful Life, Linkous slowly began recording the tracks that would become Dreamt for Light Years in the Belly of a Mountain at his Static King Studio in North Carolina. He would later tell an interviewer that his depression had stalled the creation of the album, stretching the recording process out to about five years. In 2006, he told Pitchfork Media that many of the songs that made up Dreamt for Light Years' track listing were actually songs that had been cut from It's a Wonderful Life: "Well, I'd quit working for a while and it started to get really difficult to live and pay the rent. So it was really getting down to the wire where I had to turn a record in. I had some stuff written that I didn't put on the last album, because they were just really pop songs. They felt like anachronisms on the last record. So I saved all these little pop songs."

After hearing 2004's The Grey Album, which mashed up Jay-Z's The Black Album and the Beatles' The White Album, Linkous invited the album's producer, Danger Mouse, to come to North Carolina and help him finish the tracks he had begun recording.

Although it was Sparklehorse's first studio album in five years, approximately 25 minutes of the 55-minute-long record were released in some form previously, dating from the sessions for the It's a Wonderful Life album. "Ghost in the Sky" was originally released on the Japanese pressing of It's a Wonderful Life. "Shade and Honey" appeared on a joint 7" split-single with the Shins and Mates of State. "Shade and Honey" was also sung by the actor Alessandro Nivola in the 2002 film Laurel Canyon, and Nivola's version is also found on the soundtrack. "Morning Hollow" was previously found as the hidden bonus track on It's a Wonderful Life. The track "Dreamt for Lightyears in the Belly of a Mountain" was originally released in 2001 under the title "Maxine" on both the LP version of It's a Wonderful Life and on the Gold Day EP.

"Ghost in the Sky," "Don't Take My Sunshine Away," and "Knives of Summertime" were released as singles in the weeks leading up to the release of the album.

== Album cover ==
The album cover was created by artist Robert Pokorny. The image that would eventually wind up as the record cover was originally made for a promotional poster for a Sparklehorse in-store concert at Fingerprints Records in Long Beach, California. Linkous later said that he "loved that image from the first time I saw it, and I just knew that was going to be the cover of the next album... {Pokorny} really has a great sense of realizing imagery from the music he listens to. I can't really describe anything about that image that represents anything specific in the music, but it just really seems to fit to me."

== Reception ==
Professional ratings
Aggregate scores
Source	Rating
Metacritic	78/100
Review scores
Source	Rating
AllMusic	3.5/5 stars
The Guardian	4/5 stars
PopMatters	6/10
Pitchfork	8.3/10
Rolling Stone	3/5 stars

The album garnered mostly positive reviews (notably from Pitchfork, Los Angeles Times and Entertainment Weekly)

== Track listing ==
All tracks are written by Mark Linkous.

No.	Title	Length
1.	"Don't Take My Sunshine Away"	3:05
2.	"Getting It Wrong"	2:16
3.	"Shade and Honey"	4:08
4.	"See the Light"	3:42
5.	"Return to Me"	3:18
6.	"Some Sweet Day"	4:20
7.	"Ghost in the Sky"	3:28
8.	"Mountains"	3:42
9.	"Morning Hollow"	7:23
10.	"It's Not So Hard"	2:52
11.	"Knives of Summertime"	4:19
12.	"Dreamt for Light Years in the Belly of a Mountain"	10:35
Total length:		53:08

== Charts ==
Chart (2006)	Peak position
UK Albums (Official Charts)	60
French Albums (SNEP)	71
Belgian Albums (Ultratop Flanders)	48

== Personnel ==
- Mark Linkous – vocals (all tracks), guitar (1, 4, 6–8, 10, 12, 13), bass (1, 2, 8), synthesizer (1), strings (1), electric piano (2), sampler (2, 5, 8, 12), drums (2), pump organ (2, 5), optigan (2), classical guitar (5), chamberlin (5, 13), tape loops (12), baritone guitar (9), e-Bow guitar (9), piano (13), orchestron (13)
- Danger Mouse – sampler (1, 2, 8), drum programming (1, 2), organ (2, 8)
- Sophie Michelitsianos – vocals (1, 9)
- Scott Minor – drums (1, 4, 9, 12), electronics (4, 12, 13), harmonium (9), casio (13)
- Steven Drozd – drums (1, 10), echo guitar (4)
- Dave Fridmann – bass (4, 10), vibraphone (9), Wurlitzer piano (9), mellotron (13)
- Melissa Moore – violin (4, 12), bass (12)
- Alan Weatherhead – pump organ (5), lap steel guitar (5)
- Johnny Hott – piano (5), drums (8)
- James SK Wān – vocals (9), clarinet (9)
- Tom Waits – piano (9)
- Joan Wasser – violin (9)
- Jane Scarpantoni – cello (9)
- Matthew Linkous – guitar (12)
- Tim Regan – piano (12)
- Rex White – pedal steel (13)
