= Dark Night of the Soul (album) =

Studio album by Danger Mouse and Sparklehorse
- Released: July 12, 2010
- Genre: Indie rock
- Length: 46:18
- Language: English
- Labels: Parlophone (Europe); Capitol (North America); Lex
- Producers: Danger Mouse; Sparklehorse

Alternative cover
- Final release cover

Sparklehorse chronology
In the Fishtank 15 (2009)	Dark Night of the Soul (2010)	Bird Machine (2023)

Dark Night of the Soul is a studio album by Danger Mouse and Sparklehorse, featuring collaborations by numerous notable musicians. Its release was postponed due to a legal dispute with the album's distributor EMI. It was finally released in July 2010, about a year after it had been leaked to the Internet and Danger Mouse had released a blank CD-R as a way of working around the dispute.

The album was commercially successful in the United Kingdom, and was well received by music critics.

== Content ==
The title of the album derives from La noche oscura del alma, the title given to a poem by 16th-century Spanish poet Juan de la Cruz (John of the Cross).

Dark Night of the Soul features a wide range of collaborators, including James Mercer of The Shins, Wayne Coyne of The Flaming Lips, Gruff Rhys of Super Furry Animals, Jason Lytle of Grandaddy, Julian Casablancas of The Strokes, Black Francis of the Pixies, Iggy Pop, Nina Persson of The Cardigans, Suzanne Vega, Vic Chesnutt, David Lynch, and Scott Spillane of Neutral Milk Hotel and The Gerbils; these singers also had a hand in composing and producing the work.

== Release ==
=== Legal dispute with EMI ===
The album was the subject of a legal dispute with the project's record label EMI. It was initially reported in early 2009 that there was a possibility that the album might never see release. However, the book was made available for sale on the official website of Dark Night of the Soul, bundled with a blank recordable CD-R. All copies were clearly labeled as follows:

For legal reasons, enclosed CD-R contains no music. Use it as you will.

The audio portion of the album was widely leaked around the same time.

Without going into detail, EMI acknowledged the legal dispute and released the following statement:

Danger Mouse is a brilliant, talented artist for whom we have enormous respect. We continue to make every effort to resolve this situation and we are talking to Brian Burton (Danger Mouse) directly. Meanwhile, we need to reserve our rights.

Both parties of the dispute remained silent about the particulars, but it is believed that the problems with distribution centered on a record deal that Danger Mouse signed with Lex Records.

In early 2010, it was announced that Dark Night of the Soul was slated for a tentative summer 2010 release, even though the CD-R version had been available since the previous May. A Lex Records logo appears next to the Capitol Records logo on the final version.

=== Official release ===
The full album was officially released July 12, 2010, in multiple formats. The album features a hand-numbered 100-plus-page book of photos taken by David Lynch, said to be a visual narrative for the music. This book was limited to 5,000 copies.

This was the final album that Sparklehorse leader Mark Linkous completed before his suicide on March 6, 2010, although In the Fishtank 15—recorded in 2007—was released later, and Linkous was working on another LP at the time of his death. It was also one of the final works recorded by Vic Chesnutt before his own suicide.

== Reception ==
Professional ratings
Aggregate scores
Source	Rating
Metacritic	73/100
Review scores
Source	Rating
AllMusic	3.5/5 stars
The A.V. Club	B−
Clash	9/10
The Guardian	4/5 stars
Los Angeles Times	3/4 stars
MusicOMH	3.5/5 stars
Pitchfork	7.4/10
PopMatters	9/10
Rolling Stone	3.5/5 stars
Slant Magazine	4/5 stars

Dark Night of the Soul reached No. 32 in the UK Albums Chart. It has been well received by music critics. PopMatters wrote: "Few contemporary pop albums have spoken to the human condition so eloquently, and given the listener so much pleasure in the process, than Dark Night of the Soul. It's no exaggeration to say Danger Mouse and Sparklehorse have crafted a near-masterpiece." The New York Times was less favourable, writing: "especially for a record that required so much effort, too much here feels incidental. Dark Night may end up being the final document on the ineffectiveness of Danger Mouse, a better conceptualist and prankster than producer."

== Track listing ==
Dark Night of the Soul track listing
No.	Title	Length
1.	"Revenge" (featuring The Flaming Lips)	4:52
2.	"Just War" (featuring Gruff Rhys)	3:44
3.	"Jaykub" (featuring Jason Lytle)	3:52
4.	"Little Girl" (featuring Julian Casablancas)	4:33
5.	"Angel's Harp" (featuring Black Francis)	2:57
6.	"Pain" (featuring Iggy Pop)	2:49
7.	"Star Eyes (I Can't Catch It)" (featuring David Lynch)	3:10
8.	"Everytime I'm With You" (featuring Jason Lytle)	3:09
9.	"Insane Lullaby" (featuring James Mercer)	3:12
10.	"Daddy's Gone" (featuring Mark Linkous and Nina Persson)	3:09
11.	"Man Who Played God" (featuring Suzanne Vega)	3:09
12.	"Grim Augury" (featuring Vic Chesnutt)	2:32
13.	"Dark Night of the Soul" (featuring David Lynch)	4:38

Deluxe Edition MP3 bonus tracks
No.	Title	Length
14.	"Dark Night of the Soul" (Sparklehorse Mix)	4:34

Exclusive MP3 download bonus tracks
No.	Title	Length
14.	"Revenge" (Instrumental)	4:54
15.	"Everytime I'm with You" (Instrumental)	3:11

== Personnel ==
=== Musicians ===
- Black Francis - Lead Vocals (5), Background Vocals (5)
- Julian Casablancas - Lead Vocals (4), Background Vocals (4), Solo Guitar (4)
- Vic Chesnutt - Vocals (12)
- Wayne Coyne - Lead Vocals (1), Background Vocals (1)
- Danger Mouse - Bass (7, 9), Piano (3, 7, 10), Organ (2, 7, 11), Wurlitzer (1, 2, 8, 9, 13), Mellotron (6), Keyboards (7), Synthesizer (1, 2, 3, 4, 5, 6, 8, 10, 11, 12), Drums (12), Percussion (5), Programming (2, 4, 5, 6, 7, 9, 10, 11)
- Steven Drozd - Background Vocals (1), Harmony Vocals (1), Guitar (1), Organ (1), Synthesizer (1), Drums (1), Programmed Drums (1), Programmed Strings (1)
- Dean Hurley - Electric Guitar (13), Organ (13), Drums (13), Percussion (13)
- Nathan Larson - Solo Guitar (6)
- Mark Linkous - Lead Vocals (10), Background Vocals (10), Guitar (1), Acoustic Guitar (2, 3, 4, 5, 6, 7, 9, 10, 11), Electric Guitar (2, 3, 4, 5, 6, 7, 8, 9, 10, 11, 13), Baritone Guitar (13), Bass (2, 5, 6, 8, 10), Electric Bass (1), Hohner Bass (1), Piano (7), Toy Piano (7), Organ (9), Rhodes (2), Optigan (8, 12, 13), Synthesizer (2, 4), Speak 'n Spell (13), Drums (1, 9), Programming (4, 7, 9, 11)
- Daniele Luppi - Clavioline (5), String Arrangement (1, 2, 3, 5, 7, 9, 10)
- David Lynch - Vocals (7, 13), Guitar (13), Synthesizer (13), Sound Effects (13)
- Jason Lytle - Lead Vocals (3, 8), Background Vocals (3, 8), Electric Guitar (8), Solo Guitar (3), Synthesizer (8), Programming (3)
- Heather McIntosh - Horn Arrangement (13)
- James Mercer - Lead Vocals (9), Background Vocals (2, 9)
- Money Mark - Intro Piano (2)
- Steve Nistor - Wurlitzer (1, 2), Drums (2, 3, 5, 6, 8, 10), Percussion (2, 3)
- Nina Persson - Lead Vocals (10), Background Vocals (10)
- Iggy Pop - Vocals (6)
- Gruff Rhys - Lead Vocals (2)
- Sonus Quartet - Strings (1, 2, 3, 5, 7, 9, 10)
- Scott Spillane - Horns (13), Horn Arrangement (13)
- Suzanne Vega - Lead Vocals (11), Background Vocals (11)

=== Technical ===
- Production - Danger Mouse, Mark Linkous
- Engineering - Mark Linkous, Kennie Takahashi, Todd Monfalcone
- Additional Engineering - Steven Drozd (1), Sir Doufous Styles (2), Jason Lytle (3, 8), Tom Gardner (4), Jason Carter (5), Hart Gunther (6), Dean Hurley (7, 13), Britt Myers (11), Vic Chesnutt (12), Bill Doss (13)
- Mixing - Danger Mouse, Mark Linkous, Kennie Takahashi
- Mix Assistants - Todd Monfalcone, Mike Laza, Alyssa Pittaluga
- Score Preparation - Anton Riehl (1, 2, 3, 5, 7, 9, 10)
- Mastering - Stephen Marcussen at Marcussen Mastering
- Visuals - David Lynch
- Artwork - Jacob Escobedo
- Layout - Jacob Escobedo
- Management - Ian Montone at Monotone, Inc. (Dark Night Of The Soul and Danger Mouse), Shelby Meade/Fresh and Clean (Mark Linkous)
- A&R - Jeff Antebi
- Artist Development - Jeff Antebi
- Legal - William Berrol, Esq., Craig Averill, Esq.

== Charts ==
Sales chart performance for Dark Night of the Soul
Chart (2010)	Peak position
Australian Albums (ARIA Charts)	94
Belgian Albums (Ultratop Flanders)	80
Danish Albums (Hitlisten)	35
Dutch Albums (Album Top 100)	71
French Albums (SNEP)	100
German Albums (Offizielle Top 100)	70
Scottish Albums (Official Charts)	55
Swiss Albums (Schweizer Hitparade)	40
UK Albums (Official Charts)	32
UK Album Downloads (Official Charts)	27
US Billboard 200	24
US Top Alternative Albums (Billboard)	5
US Top Rock Albums (Billboard)	9
