= Orthotonics =

American experimental rock and free improvisation group

- Also known as: Ortho-Tones
- Origin: Richmond, Virginia, United States
- Genres: Experimental rock, free improvisation, avant-garde jazz
- Years active: 1979–1984, 1989
- Labels: Rift Records, Outatune Label (Quakenbrück, Germany)
- Past members: Paul Watson; Danny Finney; Pippin Barnett; Rebby Sharp; Phil Trumbo; Tom Carson

The Orthotonics were an American experimental rock and free improvisation group from Richmond, Virginia. They began in 1979 as the Ortho-Tones, but changed their name to the Orthotonics in 1982. The group released three albums before splitting up in 1989.

Eugene Chadbourne at AllMusic said the Orthotonics were "unusual" with material "of great interest from the standpoint of text as well as musically".

== Biography ==
In 1975 Danny Finney (saxophone, vocals), Paul Watson (trumpet) and Pippin Barnett (drums) formed a jazz improvisation group, Idio Savant. Growing out of a local alternative arts community which centered around the Richmond Artists Workshop, Idio Savant released the avant-garde experimental LP album Shakers in a Tantrum Landscape on Artifacts Records in 1979.

Later in 1979, seeking a more accessible sound, the trio added Richmond musicians Rebby Sharp (guitar, vocals) and Phil Trumbo (bass guitar), and the group was reorganized under the name The Ortho-Tones, billed tongue-in-cheek as "corrective music". The Ortho-tones incorporated a lesser portion of free experimentation within a largely art rock mix. They recorded a 7-inch single, "Doo-Doo Cars / Woman Fish" which was released in 1981 by Artifacts Records. In 1982 Trumbo (who had designed most of the band's publicity flyers) moved to the West Coast to pursue a successful career as a graphic artist and was replaced by Tom Carson on bass guitar. At the same time, the group's name changed to the Orthotonics.

Still drawing on experimental rock, free improvisation and avant-garde jazz, the Orthotonics' music was "densely rhythmic [and] beat-intensive", a style that attracted the attention of new wave music fans. In 1983 the group released a cassette-only album, Accessible as Gravity which reflected their interest in the Downtown music scene, and in particular English experimental musician and composer Fred Frith, who was active in New York City at the time. Frith liked the Orthotonics, and had regularly spent time with the group. Their first LP record, Wake Up You Must Remember was released in 1984, and was mixed by Frith.

After Wake Up You Must Remember the group became inactive, but reformed again in 1986 as a trio of Sharp, Finney and Barnett, and recorded a new album, Luminous Bipeds, which Frith produced. AllMusic called this album their "most satisfying recording". In 1989 the Orthotonics disbanded. The three members were subsequently active to varying degrees in the long-lasting Richmond world music band The Ululating Mummies. Sharp and Finney later reunited in the alternative rock group, Rattlemouth. Sharp also released a solo album, In One Mouth and Out the Other in 1989, which Frith performed on. Frith's work with the Orthotonics and Sharp led to him using some of Sharp's lyrics on three of his songs on albums by Skeleton Crew and Cosa Brava.

== Members ==
Source: AllMusic

- Paul Watson (1979–1984) – trumpet, guitar
- Danny Finney (1979–1989) – saxophone, vocals
- Pippin Barnett (1979–1989) – drums
- Rebby Sharp (1979–1989) – guitar, vocals
- Phil Trumbo (1979–1982) – bass guitar
- Tom Carson (1982–1984) – bass guitar

== Discography ==
Source: Discogs

=== Albums ===
- Accessible as Gravity (1982, CT, Artifacts Records)
- Wake Up You Must Remember (1984, LP, Generic Records)
- Luminous Bipeds (1986, LP, Rift Records)

=== Singles ===
- "Doo-Doo Cars / Woman Fish" (1981, 7", Artifacts Records)
