= Monkey on a Chain Gang =

Studio album by House of Freaks
- Released: 1987
- Studio: Track Record, Rumbo Recorders
- Genre: Rock
- Label: Rhino
- Producer: Dan Matovina (tracks 3, 4 and 13), Randy Burns and House of Freaks (all others)

House of Freaks chronology
| Monkey on a Chain Gang (1987) | All My Friends (1989) |

Professional ratings
Review scores
| Source | Rating |
|---|---|
| AllMusic | 3/5 stars |

Monkey on a Chain Gang is the first album by the rock band House of Freaks. It was released in 1987 by Rhino Records on 12" vinyl (R1 70838) and a short time later on CD (R2 70838). The album was remastered and reissued by Rhino Handmade in 2004 (RHM2 7857), with thirteen additional tracks, five of which were previously unreleased.

== Track listing ==
- All songs written by Bryan Harvey and Johnny Hott, except where noted.

Original album

1. "Crack in the Sidewalk" 3:20
2. "40 Years" (Harvey) 3:20
3. "Cactusland" 3:27
4. "Lonesome Graveyard" 2:30
5. "Black Cat Bone" 2:52
6. "Bottom of the Ocean" 2:52
7. "Monkey's Paw" 1:28
8. "Yellow Dog" 3:10
9. "Long Black Train" 3:20
10. "My Backyard" 3:07
11. "Give Me a Sign" 2:35
12. "Dark and Light in New Mexico" 3:30
13. "I'll Treat You Right Someday" (CD only)
14. "You Can Never Go Home" 4:08

2004 reissue

1. "Crack in the Sidewalk"
2. "40 Years"
3. "Cactusland"
4. "Lonesome Graveyard"
5. "Black Cat Bone"
6. "Bottom of the Ocean"
7. "Monkey's Paw"
8. "Yellow Dog"
9. "Long Black Train"
10. "My Backyard"
11. "Give Me a Sign"
12. "Dark and Light in New Mexico"
13. "You Can Never Go Home"
14. "I'll Treat You Right Someday"
15. "Corinna, Corinna"
16. "Monkey's Paw" (live)
17. "Yellow Dog" (live)
18. "Pass Me the Gun" (live)
19. "Can't Change the World Anymore" (live)
20. "Ten More Minutes to Live" (live)
21. "Parchment Farm Blues" (live)
22. "Bottom of the Ocean" (early version)
23. "Crack in the Sidewalk" (early version)
24. "Give Me a Sign" (early version)
25. "While You Sleep"
26. "Barn Burning"
- Tracks 14–15 from the 12" single Bottom of the Ocean, Rhino #70408 (1987)
- Tracks 17, 21 from the 12" promotional single Live at Raji's, Rhino #RN RP3 (1987)
- Tracks 16, 18–20, 22–26 previously unreleased
