= In the Fishtank 15 =

EP by Sparklehorse and Fennesz
- Released: 15 September 2009
- Recorded: Netherlands, December 2007
- Genre: Electronic, ambient
- Length: 39:51
- Label: In the Fishtank (Konkurrent) (Fish 15)
- Producer: Zlaya Hadzic

Sparklehorse chronology
Dreamt for Light Years in the Belly of a Mountain (2006)	In the Fishtank 15 (2009)	Dark Night of the Soul (2010)

Fennesz chronology
Black Sea (2008)	In the Fishtank 15 (2009)	Szampler (2010)

In the Fishtank chronology
In the Fishtank 14 (2006)	In the Fishtank 15 (2009)

Professional ratings
Review scores
Source	Rating
PopMatters	6/10 stars

In the Fishtank 15 is a collaborative EP by Sparklehorse and Christian Fennesz. It is the fifteenth and most recent installment of the collaboration project by Konkurrent and the final release by Sparklehorse before the death of leader Mark Linkous in 2010. Fennesz had previously appeared on Sparklehorse's 2006 album Dreamt for Light Years in the Belly of a Mountain, and, following a number of live shows together, both artists felt that there was further mileage in the collaboration. The EP was recorded in two days in December 2007 and released in September 2009.

== Track listing ==
All tracks are written by Mark Linkous and Christian Fennesz.

No.	Title	Length
1.	"Music Box of Snakes"	9:46
2.	"Goodnight Sweetheart"	5:26
3.	"Shai-Hulud"	2:36
4.	"If My Heart"	5:13
5.	"Mark's Guitar Piece"	4:27
6.	"NC Bongu Buddy"	11:24
7.	"Christian's Guitar Piece"	1:28
Total length:		39:51

== Personnel ==
- Mark Linkous, Christian Fennesz – acoustic guitar, electric guitar, keyboard, composer
- Zlaya Hadzic – mixing, producer
