= Steven Culp =

American film and television actor (born 1955)

- Born: Steven Bradford Culp; December 3, 1955 (age 70); San Diego, California, U.S.
- Education: College of William and Mary (BA); Brandeis University (MFA)
- Occupation: Actor
- Years active: 1982–present
- Spouse: Barbara Ayers
- Children: 2

Steven Bradford Culp (born December 3, 1955) is an American actor. Culp appeared in films Jason Goes to Hell: The Final Friday (1993), James and the Giant Peach (1996), The Emperor's Club (2002), and most notably in the 2000 political thriller Thirteen Days playing Robert F. Kennedy.

On television, Culp had recurring roles as Clayton Webb in the CBS procedural JAG (1997–2004), and Speaker of the United States House of Representatives Jeff Haffley in the NBC political drama The West Wing (2003–2005). He also appeared as Rex Van de Kamp in the ABC comedy-drama series, Desperate Housewives.

He also appeared in How to Get Away with Murder as defense attorney Victor Leshner.

== Early life and education ==
Culp was born in La Jolla, California, the son of Mary Ann Joseph (born in Coshocton, Ohio), and Joseph Franklin Culp (born in Dallas). Both his father and stepfather were in the United States Navy. He attended First Colonial High School in Virginia Beach, Virginia. He graduated from the College of William and Mary in 1978 with a major in English literature and also studied at the University of Exeter in the United Kingdom. He earned an M.F.A. from Brandeis University in 1981.

== Career ==
One of Culp's earliest roles was in Jason Goes to Hell: The Final Friday (1993) as Robert Campbell, a reporter looking into the Jason murders. He also played the father of the titular character in James and the Giant Peach. In 1995, Culp briefly starred on The Young and the Restless as Brian Hamilton. Culp is known for his recurring roles as CIA Agent Clayton Webb on JAG (1997–2004) and Major Hayes on Star Trek: Enterprise (2003–2004). His characters in both series were killed in the same week in the shows' season finales, although Culp’s character in JAG reappeared in the series’ subsequent season premiere. In 2003, Culp appeared in a few episodes of the second season of 24 as Secret Service agent Ted Simmons. He had a recurring role in the NBC series The West Wing as Republican Speaker of the House of Representatives Jeff Haffley from 2003 to 2005.

Culp portrayed Robert F. Kennedy twice, in the HBO movie Norma Jean & Marilyn (1996) and the film Thirteen Days (2000). He played Commander Martin Madden in Star Trek: Nemesis (2002), a character written to replace William Riker as first officer of the Enterprise. However, due to the film's length, Culp's scenes were included in several cut from the final film. His scenes as Madden can be seen in the Nemesis DVD deleted scenes. In the third season of Star Trek: Enterprise, Culp played the recurring character Major Hayes, commander of the Military Assault Command Operations detachment aboard Enterprise. He was in five episodes; "The Xindi", "The Shipment", "Harbinger", "Hatchery" and "Countdown", where Hayes was shot saving a fellow crew member. Other performances include playing the leading role of the photographer Richard Stewart in the English as a Second Language educational video series Family Album, U.S.A. He also had a role as antagonist Peter Drummond in the television movie How to Make a Monster, in which computer game programmers accidentally give life to a deadly AI and members of a software company attempt to beat the game to save their lives.

From 2004 to 2005, Culp played Rex Van de Kamp on the ABC comedy-drama series Desperate Housewives for one season. His character was killed at the end of the season, although Culp reprised his role several times in flashback sequences and as narrator in one season 3 episode. In 2007, he was a regular cast member in the ABC short-lived series Traveler as Special Agent in Charge Fred Chambers. The following years, Culp guest-starred on number of shows, including NCIS, The Closer, Criminal Minds, Body of Proof, How to Get Away with Murder, Dynasty, American Horror Story: 1984 and 9-1-1. He starred as Thomas Foran in the 2010 film The Chicago 8. Culp had a recurring roles as Dr. Darren Parker on Grey's Anatomy in 2012, and from 2013 to 2014 in the NBC series Revolution as Edward Truman. From 2015 to 2018, he had a recurring role in the Amazon prime crime drama Bosch.

== Personal life ==
He is married to Barbara Ayers, and they have two children together. He had two half-sisters, Shelly Grabinsky and Kathryn Harvey. On January 1, 2006, Kathryn was murdered in Richmond, Virginia, along with her husband, Bryan, and their two daughters, Stella and Ruby.

== Filmography ==
=== Film ===
Year	Title	Role	Notes
1989	Gross Anatomy	Jerry Fanning Forrester	
1991	Dead Again	Party Guest #1	
1992	Diego Rivera: I Paint What I See	Nelson Rockefeller	
1993	Jason Goes to Hell: The Final Friday	Robert Campbell	
1993	Fearless	Emergency Doctor	
1996	James and the Giant Peach	James's father	
2000	Nurse Betty	Friend	
2000	Thirteen Days	Robert F. Kennedy	
2002	Star Trek: Nemesis	Commander Martin Madden	Deleted Scene
2002	The Emperor's Club	Older Martin Blythe	
2004	Spartan	Gaines	
2005	The Sisters	Harry Glass	
2005	Deck the Halls	Dr. Olsen	
2007	Firehouse Dog	Zachary Hayden	
2008	From Within	Pastor Joe	
2008	Leaving Barstow	Mr. Johns	
2011	The Chicago 8	Tom Foran	
2014	Captain America: The Winter Soldier	Congressman Wenham	
2017	The Last Word	Sam Serman	
2018	Collusions	Agent Robinson	

=== Television ===
Year	Title	Role	Notes
1982	Another World	Tom Nelson	1 episode
1983-1984	One Life to Live	Daniel Wolek	
1988	Lincoln	John Hay	Miniseries; 2 episodes
1988	The Cosby Show	Father-to-Be	1 episode
1989	ABC Afterschool Special		Episode: "Taking a Stand"
1989	A Man Called Hawk	Carter	1 episode
1989	Duet	Martin	1 episode
1989	Murphy Brown	Brad Stockton	1 episode
1989	Newhart	Brett	1 episode
1989	Hooperman	Sleep Project Coordinator	1 episode
1990	L.A. Law	Dr. Lettora	1 episode
1990	Father Dowling Mysteries	Bill Taylor	Episode: "The Woman Scorned Mystery"
1991	Family Album, U.S.A.	Richard Stewart	
1992	Quicksand: No Escape	Bartender	TV movie
1992	Dream On	Dan	1 episode
1993	Reasonable Doubts	Peter Maxwell	2 episodes
1993	A Walton Thanksgiving Reunion	Jeff Dulaney	TV movie
1994	Diagnosis: Murder	Company Man	1 episode
1995	Touched by an Angel	Dr. Rence Patterson	1 episode
1995	Sisters	Graham Pressman	1 episode
1995	Donor Unknown	Joel Evers	TV movie
1995	The Young and the Restless	Brian Hamilton	2 episodes
1996	Baywatch Nights	Garth Youngblood	1 episode
1996	Beverly Hills, 90210	Mr. Dreesen	1 episode
1996	Norma Jean & Marilyn	Robert F. Kennedy	
1997	Dr. Quinn, Medicine Woman	Peter Doyle	1 episode
1997	Pacific Palisades	Judge	1 episode
1997	Mike Hammer, Private Eye	Father James	1 episode
1997–2004	JAG	Clayton Webb	Recurring role; 41 episodes
1998	Pensacola: Wings of Gold	Thomas Belafontaine	1 episode
1998	Profiler		1 episode
1998	Chicago Hope	Mr. Turner	1 episode
1998	Any Day Now	Randall Clemens	1 episode
1999	Brimstone	Frankie	1 episode
1999	V.I.P.	Financial Officer	1 episode
1999–2004	ER	Dave Spencer / Dr. Charles Cameron	5 episodes
2000	Ally McBeal	Attorney Dixon	2 episodes
2000	Family Law	Mr. Petry	1 episode
2000	Providence	Dr. Jordan Roberts	1 episode
2000	Murder, She Wrote: A Story to Die For	William Batsby	
2001	How to Make a Monster	Drummond	
2001	Boston Public	Mel Breen	1 episode
2001	Philly	Detective John O'Brien	2 episodes
2002	Crossing Jordan	Detective Rick Frazier	1 episode
2002–2003	The Practice	Atty. Emmanuel Kupcheck / Hospital Atty. Alldredge	2 episodes
2002	Push, Nevada	Well-Dressed Man	6 episodes
2003	24	Ted Simmons	3 episodes
2003	Mister Sterling	Senator Ron Garland	1 episode
2003–2004	Star Trek: Enterprise	Major Hayes	Recurring role; 5 episodes
2003–2005	The West Wing	Speaker of the House Jeff Haffley	Recurring role; 9 episodes
2003	The Lyon's Den	Brad Manning	1 episode
2004	CSI: Crime Scene Investigation	Lieutenant Mendez	1 episode
2004–2012	Desperate Housewives	Rex Van de Kamp	Series regular (season 1), guest star (seasons 2–3, 5, 7–8); SAG Award for Outstanding Performance by an Ensemble in a Comedy Series (2005–2006)
2007	Numb3rs	Detective Graham Larson	1 episode
2007	Traveler	Special Agent in Charge Fred Chambers	8 episodes
2007	The Closer	Lucas Cordry	Season 3: Til Death Do Us Part, Parts I and II
2007	NCIS	Commander William Skinner	1 episode: "Chimera"
2007	Stargate Atlantis	Henry Wallace	1 episode: "Miller's Crossing"
2007	Boston Legal	A.D.A. Norman Wilson	1 episode: "Oral Contracts"
2008	Medium	Darren Swenson	1 episode
2008	Criminal Minds	Lawyer Lester Serling	1 episode: "Tabula Rasa"
2008–2009	Saving Grace	Detective Brad Gholston	3 episodes
2008	The Cleaner	Gary Smith	1 episode
2008	The Mentalist	Morgan Tolliver	1 episode
2008	Eli Stone	Jim Cooper	2 episodes
2009	Privileged	Elliot Davis	2 episodes
2009	Impact	President Edward Taylor	2 episodes
2009	Cold Case	Evan Price	1 episode
2009	CSI: Miami	Jerry Mackey	1 episode
2010	Ghost Whisperer	Dave Walker/Glen Blessing	1 episode: "Blessings in Disguise"
2010	Burn Notice	Christian Aikins	1 episode: "Where There's Smoke"
2010	The Defenders	Senator Clint Harper	1 episode
2011	The Chicago Code	Dennis Mahoney	2 episodes
2011	Law & Order: Los Angeles	Ben Corrigan	1 episode
2011	Prime Suspect USA	Richard Milner	1 episode
2012	Harry's Law	Mr. Kennedy	1 episode
2012	Body of Proof	Eric Greyson	1 episode
2012	Perception	John F. Kennedy	1 episode
2012	Grey's Anatomy	Dr. Darren Parker	4 episodes
2012	Longmire	Johnson Made	1 episode
2012	Drop Dead Diva	Bruce Forman	1 episode
2013	Revolution	Edward Truman	
2013	King & Maxwell	Michael Wallace	1 episode
2015	Scream Queens	Clark Ulrich	1 episode
2015	Bosch	D.A. Richard 'Rick' O'Shea	19 episodes
2015	Arrow	Senator Joseph Cray	1 episode
2015	Zoo	Clayton Burke	3 episodes
2016	How to Get Away with Murder	Victor Leshner	Season 2, Episode 1
2016	Code Black	Desmond Leighton	5 episodes
2016	Lopez	Bryce Vandevent	1 episode
2017	The Orville	Willks	1 episode
2018	Dynasty	Tim Myers	1 episode
2018	Waco	Jeff Jamar	2 episodes
2018	The Last Ship	President Joshua Reiss	6 episodes
2019	American Horror Story: 1984	John Thompson	1 episode: "Mr. Jingles"
2019	For the People	Arthur Covington	1 episode
2019	Dear White People	Douglas Emory	1 episode
2020	9-1-1	Henry Wallace	1 episode
2020	Dirty John	Baxter	1 episode
2021	SEAL Team	Judge Bixby	1 episode
2022–2023	The Resident	Gov. Mark Betz	4 episodes
2022–2023	The Rookie: Feds	Agent Oliver Bailor	2 episodes
2023	True Lies	Dobkin	1 episode
2024	Tracker	Scott Palmer	1 episode
2024–2025	FBI: International	Martin Russo	3 episodes
2025	Suits: LA	John Jackson	3 episodes
