= Futuropolis =

- VHS cover
- Directed by: Steve Segal; Phil Trumbo
- Written by: Steve Segal; Phil Trumbo
- Produced by: Steve Segal; Phil Trumbo
- Starring: Tom Campagnoli; Mike Cody; Stan Garth; Cassandra Cossitt; Catherine Schultz
- Cinematography: Greg Hoey
- Music by: Marty McCavitt
- Production company: Rocket Films
- Distributed by: Expanded Entertainment
- Release date: 1984
- Running time: 37 minutes
- Country: United States
- Language: English

Futuropolis is a 1984 American short animated/stop motion science fiction film written and directed by Steve Segal and Phil Trumbo. The film introduces Tom Campagnoli, Mike Cody, Stan Garth, Catherine Schultz and Cassandra Cossitt in lead roles.

== Plot ==
Space cadets Captain Garth (Stan Garth), Spud (Kirk Condyles), Lieutenant Luna (Catherine Schultz) and Cosmo (Tom Campagnoli) investigate the chaos unleashed by Lord Egghead (Mike Cody)'s "mutation ray."

== Cast ==
- Tom Campagnoli as Cosmo
- Mike Cody as Egghead
- Stan Garth as Captain Garth
- Catherine Schultz as Lieutenant Luna
- Cassandra Cossitt as 2nd Lieutenant
- Kirk Condyles as Spud
- Bud Webster as Guard
- Mary Pat Jimenez as Dispatcher
- Steve Segal as Muctu
- Phil Trumbo as Guard

== Production ==
The film is shot at Hoey/Silverman, Monument Avenue Association, Richmond Parks Recreation & Schools, Hollywood Cemetery and Skillygalley Restaurant, while the studios were provided by Alpha Recording Corp. and Science Museum of Virginia. The computer programming was made by Kermit Woodall and Steve Segal using Commodore 64.

== Reception ==
Janet Maslin of The New York Times and Peter Reiher rated this film.
