= Vivadixiesubmarinetransmissionplot =

Vivadixiesubmarine transmissionplot

Studio album by Sparklehorse
- Released: September 26, 1995
- Studio: Sound of Music Recording Studios
- Genres: Folk rock; lo-fi; neo-psychedelia
- Length: 47:30
- Label: Capitol
- Producers: Mark Linkous; David Charles

Sparklehorse chronology
Vivadixiesubmarine transmissionplot (1995)	Good Morning Spider (1998)

Singles from Vivadixiesubmarinetransmissionplot
- 1. "Spirit Ditch" Released: May 1995; 2. "Hammering the Cramps" Released: August 1995; 3. "Someday I Will Treat You Good" Released: February 5, 1996; 4. "Rainmaker" Released: August 19, 1996

Professional ratings
Review scores
Source	Rating
AllMusic	4/5 stars
NME	9/10
Spin	7/10

Vivadixiesubmarinetransmissionplot is the debut studio album by American indie rock band Sparklehorse, released on September 26, 1995, in the US and on May 6, 1996, in the UK by Capitol Records. The album was largely recorded with musicians from Cracker, for which Mark Linkous worked at the time as guitar tech, roadie and sometimes-collaborator. Most of the album was produced and recorded with Cracker's David Lowery, under the pseudonym David Charles.

== Background ==
The story of Vivadixiesubmarinetransmissionplot began in the late 1980s, when Mark Linkous, the guitarist and singer for a Los Angeles band called the Dancing Hoods, relocated to Richmond, Virginia, in an attempt to kick his drug addiction and make a fresh start. At the time, Linkous had all but given up on a career in music: "I was fed up with the music scene. It was so nasty [in Los Angeles]. That was the height of glam rock. Bands like Poison were supposed to be important."

Upon arriving in Richmond, Linkous began playing music with his brother Matt, who lived in the city, and other local musicians, including a traditional Irish group. He found himself drawn to the pure sounds of old-time music, and was inspired enough by its honesty to begin a concerted effort to reinvent his songwriting. As he told Rolling Stone in 1999, "That period was about abandoning a lot of things and just starting from scratch and learning how to write again – learning how to make art out of pain or clay."

Linkous' passion for making music was also rekindled by listening to the music of Tom Waits; he once called Waits' albums Swordfishtrombones, Rain Dogs and Bone Machine the "road map" for Vivadixie. And in a 2006 interview, he even singled out a recording of Waits singing Gavin Bryars' "Jesus' Blood Never Failed Me Yet" as the one song that "sort of saved me when I had given up [making music]."

At his Richmond practice space—located inside an old music club called the Mosque—Linkous met ex-Camper Van Beethoven frontman David Lowery. Like Linkous, Lowery had also recently moved to Richmond. Lowery was in the process of forming a new band called Cracker, and opening up his Sound of Music recording studio, where production for Vivadixie would later take place.

The unusual title of the album came from a dream that Linkous had - he described it as being "about General Lee having a crude submarine back in the Civil War, and [in the dream] I could hear an old-time band playing inside, all distorted by the water".

== Recording ==
The very first recordings made under the name Sparklehorse occurred when Lowery went on tour and left an eight-track recorder at Linkous' house.

Vivadixie featured a mix of old songs that Linkous had written years before ("Someday I Will Treat You Good") and others that were reportedly written just hours before they were tracked ("Cow" and "Weird Sisters"). The song "Spirit Ditch" features a phone message from Linkous' mother. Not wanting to record a guitar solo for the song, Linkous instead discovered what he wanted for the tune's middle section when he called home to check his messages. The lyrics for "Spirit Ditch" include the line "horse-laughter is dragging pianos to the ocean", which was inspired by a scene from the Luis Buñuel film Un chien andalou.

Although he once explained the album's idiosyncratic sound by admitting "I didn't know what I was doing", Linkous purposely used found sounds throughout the recording of the album – these included sounds that he found on records, sounds that he recorded and, in one instance ("Ballad of a Cold Lost Marble"), the sound that a defective amplifier was making when a guitar was plugged into it.

A drum machine was used on some songs instead of a live drummer, so, as a joke, Linkous listed "Al Esis" as a band member in a band bio ("Alesis" is the name of a drum machine manufacturer).

== Track listing ==
All tracks are written by Mark Linkous.

No.	Title	Length
1.	"Homecoming Queen"	3:36
2.	"Weird Sisters"	5:00
3.	"850 Double Pumper Holley"	0:36
4.	"Rainmaker"	3:47
5.	"Spirit Ditch"	3:24
6.	"Tears on Fresh Fruit"	2:08
7.	"Saturday"	2:27
8.	"Cow"	7:05
9.	"Little Bastard Choo Choo"	0:47
10.	"Hammering the Cramps"	2:49
11.	"Most Beautiful Widow in Town"	3:19
12.	"Heart of Darkness"	1:52
13.	"Ballad of a Cold Lost Marble"	0:45
14.	"Someday I Will Treat You Good"	3:42
15.	"Sad & Beautiful World"	3:33
16.	"Gasoline Horseys"	2:40

Vinyl bonus tracks
No.	Title	Length
17.	"Waiting for Nothing"	2:28
18.	"Happy Place"	2:17

== Personnel ==
- Mark Linkous – vocals, multiple instruments, production, engineering, mixing
- David Lowery (credited as "David Charles") – bass, drums, guitar (nylon), guitar (electric), keyboards, engineering, mixing, production
- Johnny Hott – drums, percussion
- Bob Rupe – bass, voices
- Paul Watson – guitar
- Mike Lucas – pedal steel
- Armistead Wellford – bass
- David Bush – drums
- Al Esis - Drums (but better)
- Dennis Herring – vibraphone, engineering, mixing, production

Technical

- John Moran – mixing
- Howie Weinberg – mastering

== Charts ==
Weekly chart performance for Vivadixiesubmarinetransmissionplot
Chart (1996)	Peak position
UK Albums (Official Charts)	58
