= It's a Wonderful Life (album) =

Studio album by Sparklehorse
- Released: June 11, 2001
- Recorded: 2000–01
- Genres: Indie rock; slowcore; art rock; chamber pop; dream pop
- Length: 61:06
- Label: Capitol/EMI
- Producers: Mark Linkous; Dave Fridmann; John Parish

Sparklehorse chronology
Distorted Ghost EP (2000)	It's a Wonderful Life (2001)	Dreamt for Light Years in the Belly of a Mountain (2006)

It's a Wonderful Life is the third studio album by American musical act Sparklehorse, released in the UK on June 11, 2001 and in the US on August 28, 2001 by Capitol and EMI. The album features appearances by Tom Waits, PJ Harvey, John Parish, Nina Persson and Dave Fridmann.

It was the band's most successful album commercially, selling over 63,000 copies.

== Recording ==
Mark Linkous recorded his first two albums, Good Morning Spider and Vivadixesubmarinetransmissionplot, in a small room inside his Virginia farm. There he worked by himself, providing all of the instrumentation and vocals for those albums. After the release of those albums, however, "the guy who hired me left [Capitol]," Linkous told Free Williamsburg Online Magazine in 2002, and his record label discouraged the solo-production process. As a result, It's a Wonderful Life was the first Sparklehorse outing in which Linkous did not perform alone in his private studio. “I didn't want to play every instrument on every song,” said the songwriter. “I didn't want to be behind the control console the whole time. I wanted to have other people's brains and input involved.” Linkous played with a full band while recording It's a Wonderful Life. He also worked with a wide array of guest musicians, which included PJ Harvey and Tom Waits.

Linkous was reportedly incredibly nervous about contacting Waits. In an interview with The Guardian, Linkous admitted he had to take five shots of whiskey before gaining the courage to call the famous singer-songwriter. During the phone call, the two men planned a meeting in California. The meeting was quite unusual and took place inside an SUV as the two men rode down a California highway. Within the car they discussed possible album ideas, their least-favorite animals, and their mutual disgust for turkey vultures. Waits went on to record the song “Dog Door” with Linkous on the album.

It's a Wonderful Life was recorded years after Linkous's near-fatal drug overdose in a London hotel room. The incident received a large amount of media coverage and was documented within several music magazines, including Rolling Stone and Spin. Linkous frequently had to answer questions about his overdose during interviews. He was also chastised by some critics for the exceedingly somber themes in his work, which had influenced the writing of the album's eponymous track.

== Composition ==
"I got fed up with people in America thinking that my music is morose and depressing and all that. That song is like a 'fuck you' to journalists, or people who are not smart enough to see what it is. But in the end, it was more about how everyday, you should pick up something, no matter how minuscule or microscopic it is, and when you go to bed, you can say I was glad that I was alive to see that. That's really what it's about."

— Linkous discussing the meaning behind the title track.

It's a Wonderful Life is generally considered to be indie rock, slowcore, and art rock, but also includes many significant elements of chamber pop ("Gold Day", "More Yellow Birds"), shoegaze and dream pop ("Piano Fire", "King of Nails", "Comfort Me"), chamber music ("It's a Wonderful Life", "Devil's New", "Babies on the Sun") and even industrial ("Dog Door").

== Sonic Cinema ==
All of the album's songs were made into music videos by various filmmakers, such as the Brothers Quay, Garine Torossian, Grant Gee, and Guy Maddin. These became the subject of the October 26, 2001, episode of the Sundance Channel series Sonic Cinema.

The Sonic Cinema: Sparklehorse episode included the following music videos, with their respective directors or talent.

- "Maxine" ("Gold Day EP" song) – Scott Minor (Drummer, Sparklehorse)
- "Gold Day" – Danny Clinch
- "Dog Door"/"Heloise" – Brothers Quay
- "Morning Hollow" – Braden King
- "Comfort Me" – Peter Ortel
- "Devil's New" – Grant Gee
- "Maxine," "King of Nails" – Jem Cohen
- "Piano Fire" – Rodney Ascher
- "It's a Wonderful Life" – Guy Maddin
- "Babies on the Sun" – Gariné Torossian
- "Fat Little Baby" – Michele Civetta

== Reception ==
Professional ratings
Aggregate scores
Source	Rating
Metacritic	81/100
Review scores
Source	Rating
AllMusic	4/5 stars
Entertainment Weekly	A−
The Guardian	4/5 stars
Los Angeles Times	3/4 stars
NME	8/10
Pitchfork	7.7/10
Q	4/5 stars
Rolling Stone	3.5/5 stars
Spin	6/10
Under the Radar	9/10

AllMusic called it Sparklehorse's "most open and direct work yet" and "a noticeably more focused effort. Though it lacks Good Morning Spider's sprawling brilliance, it's possibly Linkous' most effective, and affecting, collection of songs."

== Legacy ==
The song "Piano Fire" was featured in the 2015 video game Life Is Strange.

== Track listing ==
All tracks are written by Mark Linkous, except where stated.

CD release
No.	Title	Writer(s)	Length
1.	"It's a Wonderful Life"		2:59
2.	"Gold Day"		4:14
3.	"Piano Fire"		2:43
4.	"Sea of Teeth"		4:29
5.	"Apple Bed"		4:54
6.	"King of Nails"		4:18
7.	"Eyepennies"		5:27
8.	"Dog Door"	Mark Linkous, Kathleen Brennan, Tom Waits	2:46
9.	"More Yellow Birds"		4:53
10.	"Little Fat Baby"	Mark Linkous, Vic Chesnutt	3:40
11.	"Devil's New" (excluded from European release)		3:32
12.	"Comfort Me"		5:01
13.	"Babies on the Sun" (The song "Babies on the Sun" ends at 4:37. After 3 minutes of silence, at 7:37 begins the hidden song "Morning Hollow".)		15:03
Total length:			63:59

Vinyl release
No.	Title	Length
1.	"It's a Wonderful Life"	2:59
2.	"Gold Day"	4:14
3.	"Piano Fire"	2:43
4.	"Sea of Teeth"	4:29
5.	"Apple Bed"	4:54
6.	"King of Nails"	4:18
7.	"Eyepennies"	5:27
8.	"Dog Door"	2:46
9.	"More Yellow Birds"	4:53
10.	"Little Fat Baby"	3:40
11.	"Devil's New"	3:32
12.	"Comfort Me"	5:01
13.	"Babies on the Sun"	4:37
14.	"Maxine"	10:33
Total length:		64:06

== Charts ==
Chart (2001)	Peak position
UK Albums (Official Charts)	49
French Albums (SNEP)	48
Italian Albums (FIMI)	46

== Personnel ==
- Mark Linkous – Voice (1–7, 9–14), optigan (1, 2, 6, 8, 12, 13), chamberlin (1, 2), sampler (1, 4, 5, 8), guitar (2, 4, 5, 6, 8, 10, 12), Wurlitzer piano (2), percussion (2), acoustic guitar (3), Casio keyboard (3), mellotron (4, 13), drum machine (5, 12), Prophet 5 synthesizer (6, 12), drums (8), backwards high pitched voice (8), Magic Genie organ (9), Moog synthesizer (12, 13), wire recorder (13), baritone guitar (14), e-bow guitar (14)
- Dave Fridmann – bass (2, 4, 12), Wurlitzer piano (2, 14), mellotron (2), piano (4, 12), chamberlin (12, 13), glockenspiel (13), vibraphone (14)
- Joel Hamilton – Engineer
- Polly Jean Harvey – voice (3, 7), electric guitar (3), piano (3), guitar (7)
- Sophie Michalitsianos – Voice (6, 10, 12–14), bass (6)
- Scott Minor – Drums (2–4, 6, 7, 10, 12, 14), orchestron (2), electronic birds (2), electronics (3, 5, 12, 13), Russian satellite (4), chamberlin (4), filtered drums (5), percussion (6, 12), Korg MS-20 keyboard (12), harmonium (14)
- John Parish – bass (3), Casio keyboard (3), piano (7)
- Nina Persson – voice (2, 5)
- Miguel Rodriguez – drums (9)
- Bob Rupe – bass (5, 10)
- Jane Scarpantoni – cello (5, 10, 14)
- Adrian Utley – Dictaphone (2), bass (7), Kitty-Cat guitar (8), fuzzy-ending bass (8)
- Tom Waits – voice (8), big seed pod (8), metal things (8), train (8), piano (14)
- Joan Wasser – violin (5, 10, 14), Wurlitzer piano (10)
- Alan Weatherhead – orchestron (9), mellotron (9), chamberlin (9), lap steel guitar (9)
- Margaret White – bass (9), violin (9)
- Rex L. White—pedal-steel guitar (12)
