= Bryan Harvey (musician) =

- Bryan Harvey playing as part of House of Freaks at LA's Club Lingerie, circa 1988

Background information
- Born: Bryan Taber Harvey; April 27, 1956; Richmond, Virginia, U.S.
- Died: January 1, 2006 (aged 49) Richmond, Virginia, U.S.
- Occupations: Musician, guitarist, singer
- Years active: 1982–2006
- Formerly of: Johnny Hott, House of Freaks

Bryan Taber Harvey (April 27, 1956 – January 1, 2006) was an American musician noted for his fronting role in House of Freaks.

== Life and career ==
Harvey first gained attention in the early 1980s as singer-guitarist in a power pop band based out of Richmond, Virginia, called The Dads. Popular at East Coast colleges, the band reached the pinnacle of its success in 1984 with the release, on CBS records, of its self-titled album.

Harvey's subsequent musical career included long-time participation in the indie supergroup Gutterball, which featured former Dream Syndicate frontman Steve Wynn. Harvey's most enduring project, however, was House of Freaks, a two-man band with Richmond percussionist Johnny Hott, who had a penchant for banging on anything he could drag into the studio that made the noise he wanted.

House of Freaks was signed to Rhino Records for their first three albums, but had trouble finding a permanent home towards the end of the band's existence, bouncing around from indie to indie. They played with other groups on occasion, most notably on a couple of tracks with the Norfolk band Waxing Poetics (whose first album was produced by Mitch Easter and R.E.M. bassist Mike Mills). Their debt to the blues was evident from their first album, but they later moved more and more towards the stripped down style of rockabilly bands like the Chickasaw Mudpuppies and the Flat Duo Jets. However, they were closer in spirit to artists like Tom Waits or Lyle Lovett, exploring in particular the blessing/curse of family and community and their effects on the individual.

House of Freaks disbanded in 1995. Both members were involved with the making of the most recent Gutterball outing, but the rumors say that Hott has left that group as well and been replaced by the drummer for The dB's. Bryan Harvey completed a solo album in early 1997, which remains unreleased. Gutterball is still considered to be an open project by the people involved; however, no plans have been made to record new material.

== Murder ==
Bryan along with his wife Kathryn Harvey (née Grabinsky, born November 28, 1966, aged 39), maternal half-sister of actor Steven Culp, and their two daughters Stella (b. November 3, 1996, aged 9) and Ruby (b. July 4, 2001, aged 4) on January 1, 2006, were victims of the 2006 Richmond spree murders. Hott had approached the Harvey home in South Richmond in anticipation of a New Year's Day party and discovered that the house was on fire. Authorities subsequently found the four family members slain in the basement, the result of a home invasion.

== Legacy ==
In early 2006, a compilation album of Harvey's music, Remember Me Well, was released.

In 2006 the documentary Crack In The Sidewalk about Harvey and House of Freaks was released, directed by Kris Kristensen.
