= Reva, Virginia =

Unincorporated community in Virginia, United States

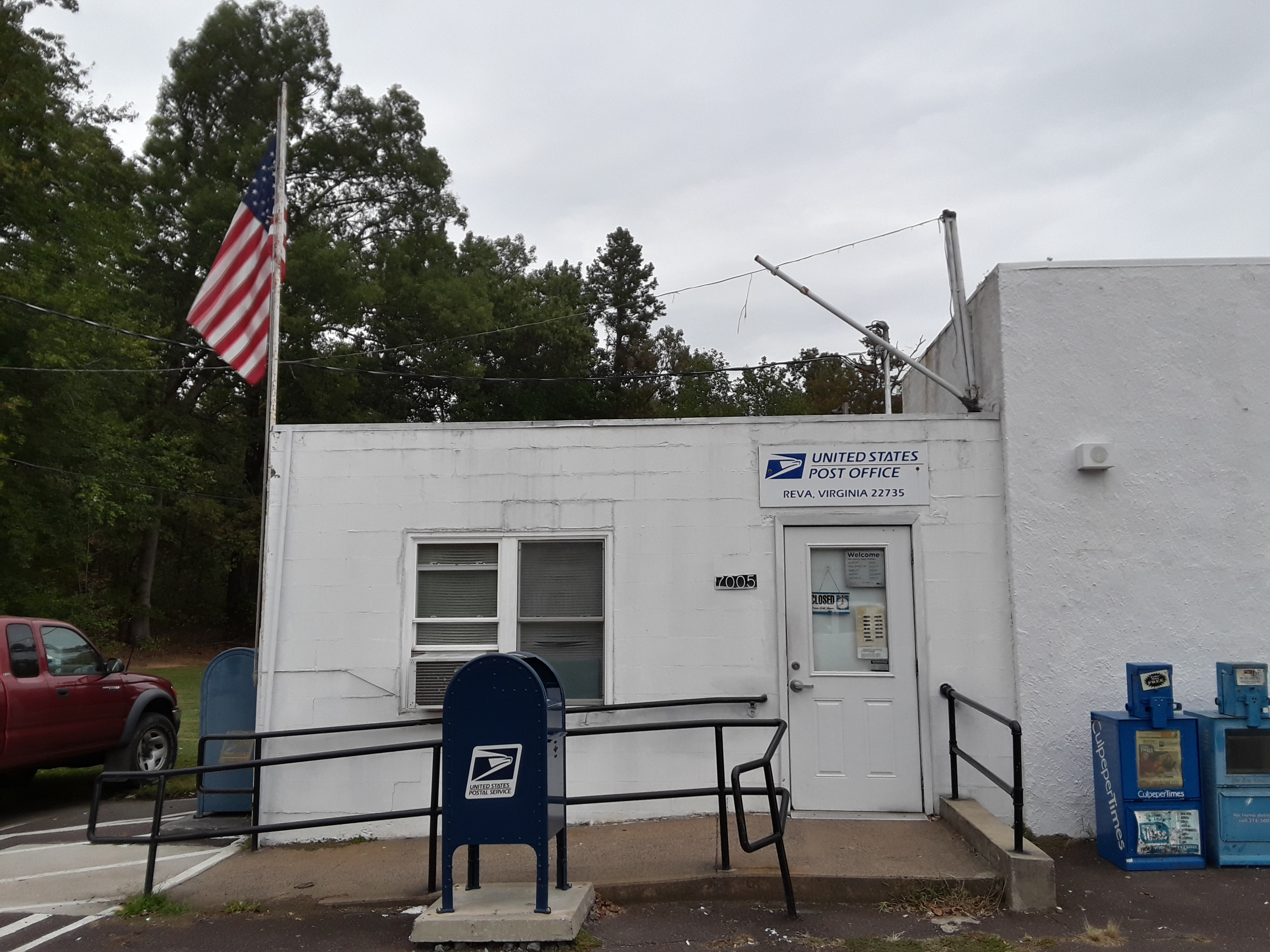
Post office in Reva

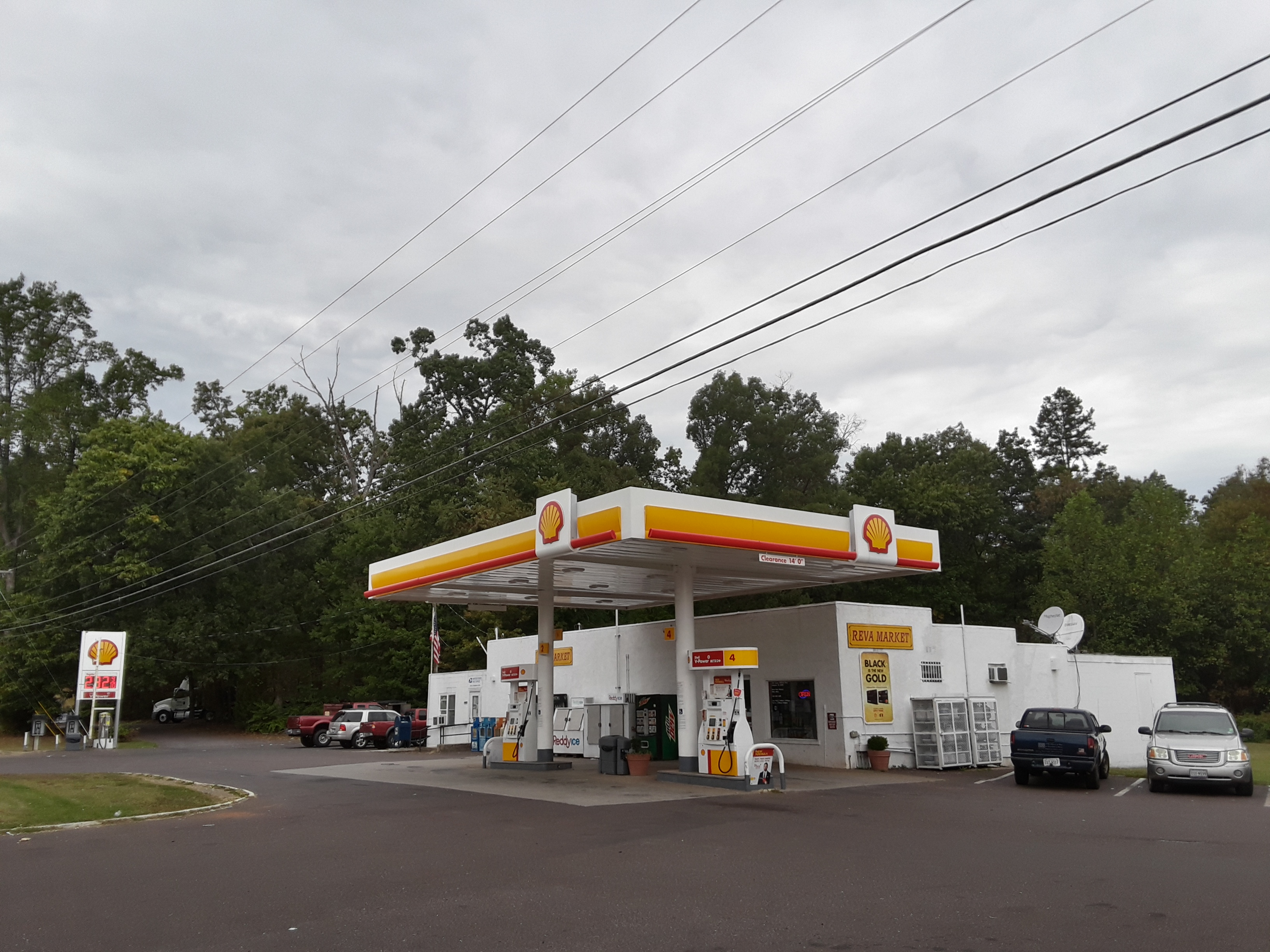
The Reva Market, attached to the post office

Reva is an unincorporated community in Culpeper County, Virginia, United States. Reva was named for Reva Burgess, the daughter of Walter Burgess. The first Reva post office opened on March 24, 1893. A second Reva post office and store opened in 1907 at the intersection of Reva Road and Shanktown Road, eventually becoming the center of Reva. In 1977, the Reva post office relocated to the intersection of US-29 and Reva Road (Route 633), adjoining the Reva Market. The Reva Market, a convenience store specializing in fresh prepared breakfasts and ice cream, is Reva's only store. The Reva Market is located near the original Brown's Store polling location.

Reva has a volunteer fire department located at the intersection of Birmingham Road and US-29.

Reva is in the Brown's Store precinct of the Salem Magisterial District, Virginia.
