= Steve Segal =

American animator and filmmaker

Steve Segal (born 1949) is an American animator and filmmaker known for his independent animated shorts as well as his contribution to Pixar films like Toy Story.

== Early life and education ==
Steve Segal was born in 1949 in Richmond, Virginia.

== Animation and film production ==
Futuropolis, the creation of Steve Segal and Phil Trumbo, premiered in 1984 at the Biograph Theatre near Virginia Commonwealth University in Richmond, Virginia. Futuropolis is a combination of real film, imaginative clunky sets, live actors, and animation. Both Segal and Trumbo were graduates of VCU and closely collaborated on early animation projects in Richmond.

He also directed the 1975 animated short Red Ball Express, a train-based drawn on film to the tune of "Orange Blossom Special".

== Teaching ==
Segal was a professor in the animation department at Academy of Art University, San Francisco, California.

As of 2017 Segal was teaching animation at the California College of the Arts. and

== Honors, awards, and community activity ==
Steve Segal has produced independent short films which have won awards at international film festivals, including Cannes International Film Festival, Zagreb Animation Festival, Ottawa International Animation Festival, Sinking Creek Film Festival (now renamed Nashville Independent Film Fest) and the Animation Celebration Festival.

He worked on the 2014 CCA group project Domoic Acid Attack, which was made for the Marine Mammal Center in Sausolito, California to generate awareness of the problem of domoic acid (DA) affecting the food chain of sea lions. His performance piece Outside the Box won first place in the 2014 San Francisco International Film Festival.

Segal attended and wrote a review of the Hiroshima International Animation Festival in 2016.

== See also ==
- Norman McLaren
- Experimental film
