= Johnny Hott =

American musician

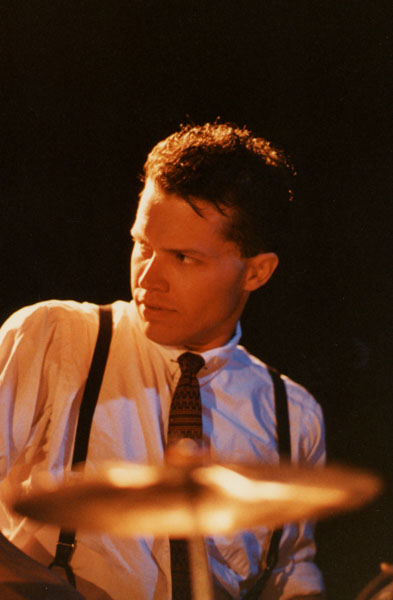
Johnny Hott playing as part of House of Freaks at LA's Club Lingerie, circa 1988.

Johnny Hott is the former drummer for the House of Freaks, a musical duo with singer/guitarist Bryan Harvey. He was also one of three drummers for the band Cracker. He has also played drums for indie supergroup Gutterball and drums and keyboards for Sparklehorse. Hott remains an active musician and lives in Richmond, Virginia.
