= Sparklehorse =

American indie rock band

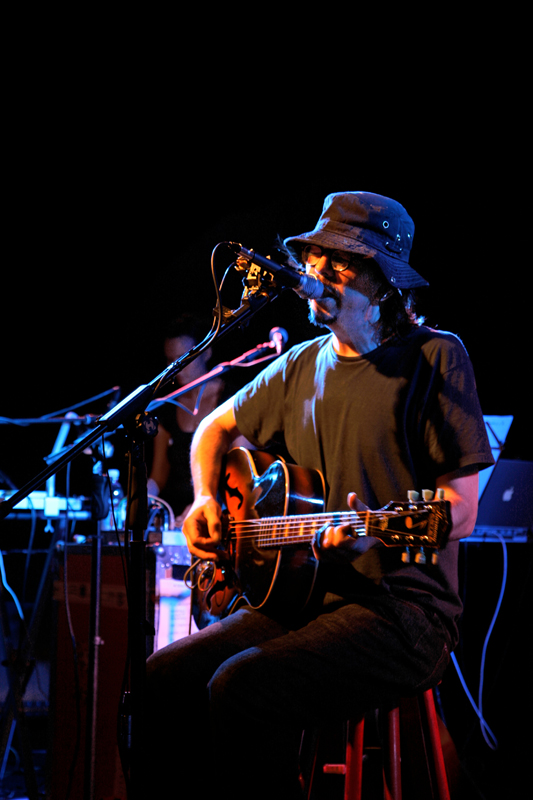

Background information
- Origin: Richmond, Virginia, U.S.
- Genres: Indie rock; alternative rock; alternative country; psychedelic rock
- Years active: 1995–2010
- Labels: EMI (Capitol, Parlophone, Odeon, Astralwerks); Slow River; Devil in the Woods
- Past members: Mark Linkous; Scott Minor: Scott Fitzsimmons; Johnny Hott; Paul Watson
- Website: sparklehorse.com

Sparklehorse was an American indie rock band from Richmond, Virginia, led by singer and multi-instrumentalist Mark Linkous. It was active from 1995 until Linkous's death in 2010. Linkous said he chose the name Sparklehorse because the two words sounded good together and could be a loose metaphor for a motorcycle. At its inception, members of Sparklehorse included Paul Watson (banjo, cornet, lap steel and electric guitar), Scott Minor (drums, chord organ, banjo), Johnny Hott (Wurlitzer organ, percussion, backing vocals), and Scot Fitzsimmons (standup bass).

== History ==
Sparklehorse's first album, Vivadixiesubmarinetransmissionplot (1995), produced by Cracker frontman David Lowery (credited as "David Charles" on the record), was a modest college radio success. In 1996, while touring Europe with Radiohead shortly after the album's release, Linkous consumed a combination of anti-depressants, valium, alcohol, and heroin in a London hotel room. Unconscious and with his legs pinned beneath him for almost 14 hours, the resulting potassium build-up caused his heart to stop for several minutes after his body was lifted up. The ensuing surgery almost caused him to lose the use of both legs and, as a result, he needed to use a wheelchair for six months and required dialysis for acute kidney failure.

Good Morning Spider (1998) was recorded following this incident. Critics have conjectured that Linkous's brush with death inspired the album's somber tone, but Linkous said that much of GMS had already been written. One song that resulted from his affliction is "St. Mary", which is dedicated to the nurses at the eponymous hospital in Paddington where Linkous recuperated.

In 1999 Sparklehorse performed at the Horseshoe Tavern in Toronto. 2001 saw the release of It's a Wonderful Life, featuring appearances by Tom Waits, PJ Harvey, Bob Rupe, Nina Persson and Dave Fridmann. Much of Vivadixie... and Spider were recorded solely by Linkous on his Virginia farm, but the new album was more collaborative. Linkous expressed his satisfaction with the overall sound of It's a Wonderful Life, which was engineered by Joel Hamilton, while also saying he would have preferred to include more experimental and instrumental material.

On September 25, 2006, Sparklehorse released its fourth album, Dreamt for Light Years in the Belly of a Mountain, collaborating with Danger Mouse, Christian Fennesz, and Steven Drozd. This album featured the radio release "Don't Take My Sunshine Away" and a remastered version of "Shade And Honey", which Linkous originally wrote for Alessandro Nivola to sing in the 2003 movie Laurel Canyon, as well as a virtually unchanged re-release of "Morning Hollow", the bonus track on It's a Wonderful Life.

In 2008, Sparklehorse recorded a cover of "Jack's Obsession" from Tim Burton's The Nightmare Before Christmas for the official compilation album Nightmare Revisited.

In 2009, Sparklehorse teamed up with Danger Mouse and David Lynch on the project Dark Night of the Soul. Corliss et al. (2010) described Dark Night of the Soul as “spooky, beautiful, (and)... bittersweet...considering Linkous’ untimely death.”

In 2009, Linkous collaborated with electronic ambient-music artist Christian Fennesz to create In the Fishtank 15, a wafting EP of experimentation and dreamy atmospherics. In October 2009, Linkous performed with Fennesz during a European tour.

Linkous died by suicide in Knoxville, Tennessee, on March 6, 2010, effectively ending the band. In 2023, Bird Machine – the Sparklehorse album Linkous was working on at the time of his death – was completed by Linkous' brother and sister-in-law, Matt and Melissa Linkous, and released on 8 September.

== Discography ==
=== Studio albums ===
- Vivadixiesubmarinetransmissionplot (September 1995, UK No. 58)
- Good Morning Spider (October 1998, UK No. 30)
- It's a Wonderful Life (June 2001, UK No. 49)
- Dreamt for Light Years in the Belly of a Mountain (September 2006, US Heatseekers No. 11, UK No. 60)
- Dark Night of the Soul (with Danger Mouse) (2010, UK No. 32)
- Bird Machine (September 2023)

=== EPs ===
- Chords I've Known EP (CD, April 1996)
- Distorted Ghost EP (CD, July 2000)
- In the Fishtank 15 EP (with Fennesz – September 2009)

=== Compilations ===
- Chest Full of Dying Hawks ('95–'01) (U.S. promo) (2001)
- Stained Glass Tears ('95–'06) (CD, Promo, Comp) (Capitol Records, 2006)

=== Singles ===
- "Spirit Ditch" / "Waiting for Nothing" (7", 1995, US)
- "Hammering the Cramps" / "Too Late" (7", 1995, US)
- "Someday I Will Treat You Good" / "Rainmaker" (7", February 1996, US Modern Rock No. 35)
- "Someday I Will Treat You Good" / "London" / "In The Dry" (7" & CD, February 1996, UK)
- "Hammering the Cramps" / "Spirit Ditch" / "Dead Opera Star" / "Midget In A Junkyard" (7" & CD, April 1996)
- "Rainmaker" / "I Almost Lost My Mind" / "Intermission" / "Homecoming Queen (Live On KCRW)" / "Gasoline Horseys (Live On KCRW)" (7" & 2x CDs, August 1996, UK No. 61)
- "Come On In" / "Blind Rabbit Choir" (7", February 1998, US)
- "Maria's Little Elbows" / "Painbirds" / "Wish You Were Here" (with Thom Yorke) (Pink Floyd cover) / "Haint" (CD, July 1998)
- "Sick of Goodbyes" / "Good Morning Spider (BBC Radio 1 Evening Session)" (7", October 1998, UK No. 57)
- "Sick of Goodbyes" / "Happy Place" / "Happy Pig (BBC Radio 1 Evening Session)" / "Shot A Dog" / "Gasoline Horseys (Live)" (2x CDs, October 1998, UK No. 57)
- "Gold Day" / "Heloise" / "Devil's New" / Maxine" (CD, July 2001)
- "Don't Take My Sunshine Away" / "Ghost In The Sky" / "Knives of Summertime" (CD, 4 September 2006)
- "Don't Take My Sunshine Away" / "Galveston" (Jimmy Webb/Glen Campbell cover) (7", 4 September 2006)
- "Ghost in the Sky" / "Marigold" (7", 11 September 2006)
- "Knives of Summertime" / "Caroline" (7", 18 September 2006, US)

=== Various artists compilations ===
- "Heart of Darkness" on "Dear Charlottesville" (1995)
- "Heart of Darkness" on "Cowpunks" (1996)
- "Sad & Beautiful World" on "Boys Soundtrack" (1996)
- "West of Rome" (Vic Chesnutt cover) on "Sweet Relief II: Gravity of the Situation" (1996)
- "Hammering The Cramps" on "Chicago Cab Soundtrack" (1996)
- "Hammering The Cramps" on "Mmmmm..." (Q Magazine CD issue Q118) (July 1996)
- "Wish You Were Here" (with Thom Yorke) (Pink Floyd cover) on "Come Again" (November 1997)
- "Wish You Were Here" (with Thom Yorke) (Pink Floyd cover) on "chEMIstry: A Hundred Years Of EMI" (VOX Magazine CD) (November 1997)
- "Maria's Little Elbows" on "The MOJO Machine Turns You On – Let MOJO Take You There" (MOJO Magazine Subscriptions CD Volume 6) (July 1998)
- "Hey Joe" on "Unconditionally Guaranteed" (UNCUT Magazine CD issue UG-1 7) (January 1999)
- "Sad & Beautiful World" on "Dreamworld: Essential Late Night Listening" (2000)
- "Happy Pig" on "Unconditionally Guaranteed 2000.8" (UNCUT Magazine CD issue UG-21 27) (September 2000)
- "Galveston" (Jimmy Webb/Glen Campbell cover) on "New Sounds Of The Old West Volume Three" (2001)
- "Shade And Honey" on "Devil In The Woods Magazine 3.3" (2001)
- "Little Fat Baby" on "19-Track Guide To The Month's Best Music" (UNCUT Magazine CD issue UG-32 38) (August 2001)
- "It's A Wonderful Life" on "Laurel Canyon Soundtrack" (2003)
- "Go" (with The Flaming Lips) (Daniel Johnston cover) on "The Late Great Daniel Johnston: Discovered Covered" (2004)
- "Dark As A Dungeon" (Merle Travis/Johnny Cash cover) on "Cash Covered – Tribute To Johnny Cash" (MOJO Magazine CD issue 132) (November 2004)
- "Wish You Were Here" (with Thom Yorke) (Pink Floyd cover) on "Lords of Dogtown: Music from the Motion Picture" (2005)
- "Painbirds" on "Across The Great Divide: Music Inspired By The Band" (UNCUT Magazine CD issue 2005–04) (April 2005)
- "Shade And Honey" on "The Playlist / October 2006" (UNCUT Magazine CD issue 2006–10) (October 2006)
- "Shade And Honey" on "Love Will Tear You Apart – Tracks Of Hurt, Pain & Despair" (MOJO Magazine CD issue 159) (February 2007)
- "Jack's Obsession" (Danny Elfman cover) on "Nightmare Revisited" (2008)
- "Dark Night Of The Soul" (with Dangermouse featuring David Lynch) on "NowHearThis!" (WORD Magazine CD issue 91) (September 2010)
- "Listening To The Higsons" (Robyn Hitchcock cover) on "Now Playing - 12 Tracks Of The Month's Best Music" (UNCUT Magazine CD issue 2023–10) (October 2023)

=== Guest appearances on Cracker tracks ===
- "Eyes of Mary" on "Garage D'Or" (2000)
- "Rainy Days and Mondays" (The Carpenters cover) on "Garage D'Or" (2000)

== Filmography ==
- Southern Man: Sparklehorse (1998, VPRO, 50mins)
- This is Sparklehorse (2019, Seven & Seven, 90mins)

== Legacy ==
In March 2020, Spin magazine wrote that Linkous was more respected by his peers, such as PJ Harvey, Nina Persson and Tom Waits, than recognized by the record-buying public.
