= Mark Linkous =

American musician (1962–2010)

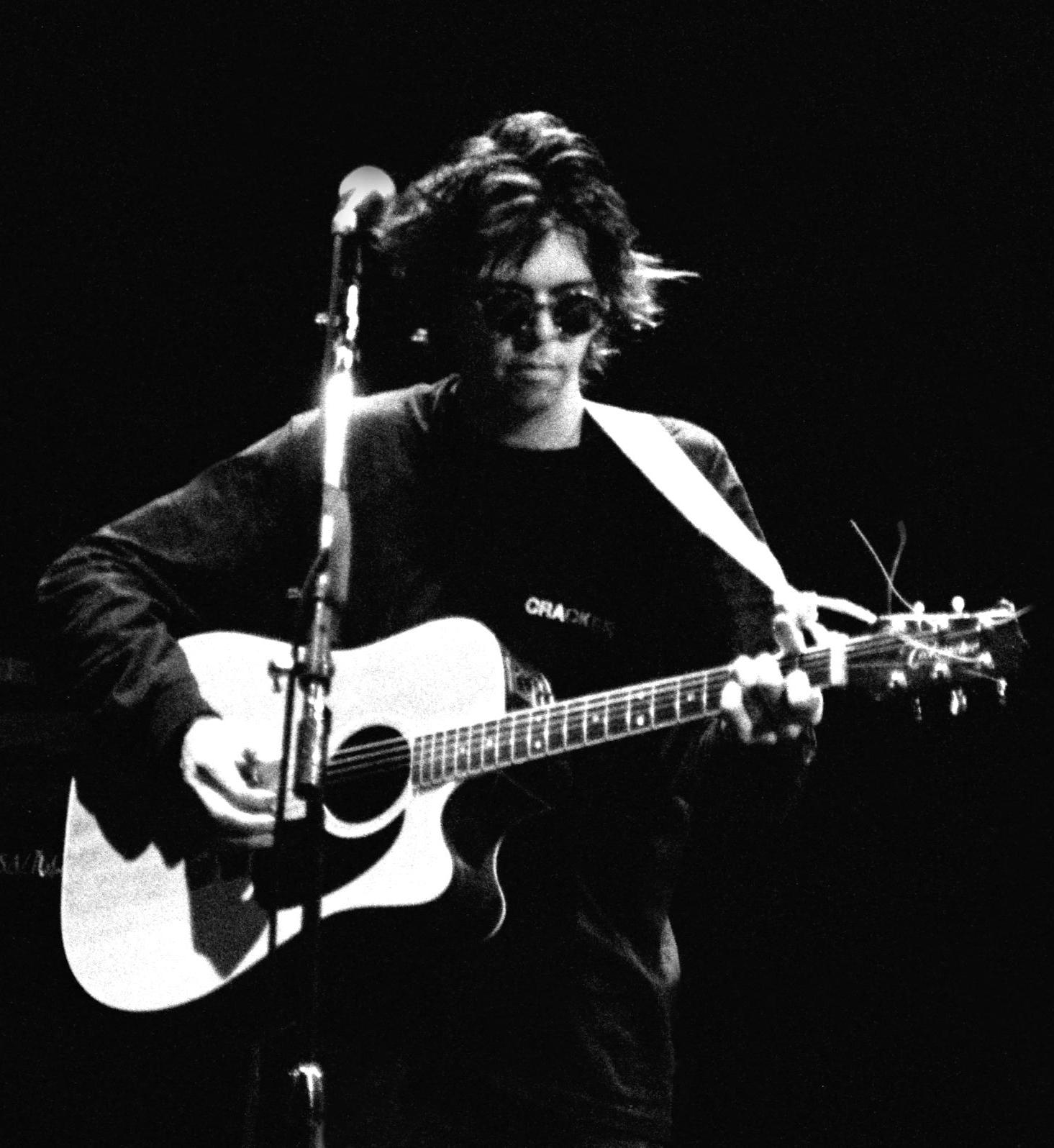
- Linkous in 1992

Background information
- Born: Frederick Mark Linkous; September 9, 1962; Arlington, Virginia, US
- Died: March 6, 2010 (aged 47) Knoxville, Tennessee, US
- Genres: Lo-fi; indie rock; alt-country; bluegrass; folk; psychedelic; southern gothic
- Occupations: Musician; singer-songwriter; record producer
- Instruments: Vocals; guitar; piano; keyboards; bass guitar; drums; percussion
- Years active: 1984–2010
- Labels: Capitol; EMI; Astralwerks; Caroline; Virgin; EMI; Konkurrent; Combat; Relativity; Anti-; Epitaph
- Website: sparklehorse.com

Frederick Mark Linkous /ˈlɪŋkəs/ (September 9, 1962 – March 6, 2010) was an American singer, songwriter and multi-instrumentalist, best known as leader of Sparklehorse. He was also known for his collaborations with such artists as Tom Waits, PJ Harvey, Daniel Johnston, Cracker, Radiohead, Black Francis, Julian Casablancas, Nina Persson, David Lynch, Fennesz, Danger Mouse, and Sage Francis.

A member of the 1980s indie band the Dancing Hoods, Linkous moved with the group from his native Virginia to New York City and later Los Angeles in hopes of achieving mainstream success. By 1988, the band had failed to land a major record label deal, and it disbanded, with Linkous returning to Virginia.

By 1995, he created a project named Sparklehorse, of which he remained the only permanent member. The band released a quartet of critically acclaimed albums: on Capitol Records, Vivadixiesubmarinetransmissionplot, Good Morning Spider, and It's a Wonderful Life; and on Astralwerks records, Dreamt for Light Years in the Belly of a Mountain. Linkous lived the last years of his life in Hayesville, North Carolina, where he established Static King Studio. He died by suicide in Knoxville, Tennessee, on March 6, 2010.

== Biography ==
=== Early life ===
Frederick Mark Linkous was born on September 9, 1962, in Arlington, Virginia, to Gloria Hughes Thacker and Frederick Linkous. He had three brothers. Many members of his family were coal miners by trade, and Linkous chose a career in music in part to avoid working in mines. His parents divorced before he was 13.

He later characterized himself during his teenage years as a "juvenile delinquent", and began hanging out in a motorcycle gang at a young age. During his adolescence, he was sent to live with his paternal grandparents in Charlottesville, Virginia. Linkous also attended Albemarle High School in Charlottesville, where he "went to school to see my friends—that's the only reason I didn't drop out." During his high school years, he began abusing alcohol and consuming marijuana heavily.

=== Dancing Hoods ===
Shortly after graduating from high school in the early 1980s, Linkous moved to New York City, where he co-founded the band Dancing Hoods. It featured Linkous on guitar and vocals, Bob Bortnick on vocals and guitar, Don Short on drums, and Eric Williams on bass. In 1984, the group released a self-titled EP; a year later, it released the album 12 Jealous Roses on Relativity Records, which received a number of positive reviews. The Replacements and The Del Fuegos were also vocal fans of the band after the release of its first record.

In 1988, Dancing Hoods put out its second album, Hallelujah Anyway, on Combat Records. A single from the album, "Baby's Got Rockets", was a modest college radio hit, and its video was picked up by MTV's program 120 Minutes. The same year, the group relocated to Los Angeles in hopes of achieving mainstream success, but broke up shortly after.

=== Salt Chunk Mary ===
Following the breakup of Dancing Hoods, Linkous moved back to Virginia. There, before he started the Sparklehorse project, he had another band consisting of Frederick Mark Linkous, Matt Linkous, Chip Jones, and Steve Schick. Formed in late 1989 as The Johnson Family, it soon became Salt Chunk Mary—both names being characters in Jack Black's memoir You Can't Win. Demos were circulated, but no official releases were made. By 1995, Mark Linkous formed the solo project Sparklehorse, taking a couple of Salt Chunk Mary songs with him, and Matt Linkous later formed The Rabbit with Melissa Moore.

=== Sparklehorse ===
After Dancing Hoods broke up, Linkous moved back to Virginia, where he continued writing songs. One of the tracks he wrote during this period with David Lowery, "Sick of Goodbyes", was recorded by Cracker and appeared on its 1993 album Kerosene Hat. While in Virginia, he performed concerts under the monikers The Johnson Family (with members of Richmond punk legends Honor Role) and Salt Chunk Mary. Linkous finally settled on the band name Sparklehorse, and released Vivadixiesubmarinetransmissionplot on Capitol Records in 1995. He remained the only consistent member throughout the band's existence.

In 1996, while supporting Radiohead on the first Sparklehorse tour, Linkous overdosed on alcohol, Valium, antidepressants, and possibly other substances in his London hotel room. Rendered unconscious, he collapsed with his legs pinned beneath him, and remained in that position for almost 14 hours. He was treated at St Mary's Hospital, London. Subsequent surgeries saved both legs, but he required the use of a wheelchair for six months. His legs never regained their original strength.

1998 saw the release of Good Morning Spider; one of the album's songs, "St. Mary", dealt with Linkous's accident in London and subsequent rehabilitation. In 2001, Sparklehorse released It's a Wonderful Life, which featured contributions from Tom Waits, PJ Harvey, John Parish, Nina Persson, Vic Chesnutt, and Dave Fridmann.

In 2003, Sparklehorse's song "Sea of Teeth" was featured on the soundtrack for All the Real Girls, a film starring Zooey Deschanel and directed by David Gordon Green.

In September 2006, Sparklehorse released Dreamt for Light Years in the Belly of a Mountain. The album marked a new collaboration with DJ Danger Mouse.

In 2009, Linkous teamed up with electronic ambient artist Christian Fennesz to create In the Fishtank 15, an experimental EP. The last four live shows Linkous did with Fennesz were during a European tour in October 2009.

At the time of his death, his manager confirmed that Linkous "had completed most of the work for a new Sparklehorse album", was in the process of moving to Knoxville, Tennessee, and was working on setting up a studio where he planned to finish the record.

=== Dark Night of the Soul ===
In the late 2000s, Linkous recorded the album Dark Night of the Soul with the producer Danger Mouse, the director David Lynch, and ten other musicians. It was released on the Internet in May 2009, as was a book of photographs by Lynch to accompany the music. Though long delayed due to legal problems, it was officially released in 2010 several months after Linkous's death. The album features several guest singers and writers, such as The Flaming Lips and Iggy Pop. Vic Chesnutt, another guest on the album, died by suicide a few months before Linkous. Because of this, the album is dedicated "in memory of Mark Linkous and Vic Chesnutt".

=== Production and other work ===
Aside from his own music, Linkous became a sought-after record producer, and helmed works such as Nina Persson's solo record, A Camp, the track "Silverlake" by Azure Ray (feat. Sparklehorse) which is the first recording by Azure Ray after its six-year hiatus ended in 2009, later rerecorded and released by Saddle Creek Records after Linkous's death along with the demo he created, and Daniel Johnston's Fear Yourself. Linkous was one of Johnston's most ardent supporters. Johnston was an outsider artist who had a long battle with mental illness. In 2004, Linkous curated and produced The Late Great Daniel Johnston: Discovered Covered, a tribute album featuring acts such as Beck, Death Cab for Cutie, Vic Chesnutt, Tom Waits and Bright Eyes, and a collaboration between Sparklehorse and The Flaming Lips on the track "Go."

He collaborated with Bangles singer-songwriter Susanna Hoffs on several tracks for an unrealized solo album in 1993–1994, cowriting and contributing songs and playing on tracks including a cover of Johnston's "Go." Linkous also provided music for rapper Sage Francis's album Li(f)e and the song "Love The Lie." The album and song were released after Linkous's death.

== Death ==
In March 2010, Linkous was about to move into a spare bedroom in the Knoxville home of bandmate Scott Minor; Linkous was apparently in the process of breaking up with his wife of 19 years, Teresa. Linkous battled depression for many years and was greatly shaken by the December 2009 suicide of his close friend Vic Chesnutt.

In the early afternoon of March 6, 2010, Linkous was drinking Kentucky bourbon with Minor and friend DeWitt Burton at their home. After receiving a number of text messages on his BlackBerry that left him distraught, he told Minor and Burton, "It's not good." Linkous quietly retrieved his ITM Arms rifle from an upstairs room, then told his two friends that he was going for a walk and left through a back door. At about 1:15pm, a witness saw him sit down in an alley near Minor's house on Irwin Street, aim the rifle at his own heart, and pull the trigger. Linkous was declared dead at the scene; he was 47 years old.

Police did not find a suicide note. Linkous's publicist confirmed the details of his death to a number of publications that day. According to his toxicology report, his blood alcohol content was a potentially fatal 0.43% at the time of his death; benzodiazepines and antidepressants were also found in his system.

Teresa Linkous died six years later, on March 5, 2016, from an acute asthma attack.

=== Reaction ===
Within a few hours of his death, a message attributed to the Linkous family was posted on the official Sparklehorse website: "It is with great sadness that we share the news that our dear friend and family member Mark Linkous took his own life today. We are thankful for his time with us and will hold him forever in our hearts. May his journey be peaceful, happy, and free. There's a heaven and there's a star for you."

A number of notable musicians and people in the music world made statements mourning the loss of Linkous, including Patti Smith, Radiohead's Colin Greenwood, Grandaddy's Jason Lytle, Silversun Pickups' Brian Aubert, Death Cab for Cutie's Chris Walla, Steven Drozd and Wayne Coyne of The Flaming Lips, Steve Albini, Gemma Hayes, and the Jesus Lizard's David Wm. Sims. Emily Haines of Metric wrote a eulogy titled "The Rings of Saturn on Your Fingers".

The Orange County Register published an appreciation of his work alongside a discussion of his depression and his relationship to other musical artists.
