= Garage d'Or =

Greatest hits album by Cracker
- Released: April 4, 2000
- Genre: Alternative rock
- Length: 114:36
- Label: Virgin

Cracker chronology
Gentleman's Blues (1998)	Garage d'Or (2000)	Forever (2002)

Professional ratings
Review scores
Source	Rating
AllMusic	4/5 stars
The New Rolling Stone Album Guide	3/5 stars
The Village Voice	(1-star Honorable Mention)

Garage d'Or is a compilation album by American rock band Cracker. It is a two disc album, with the first disc representing a "greatest hits" collection, and the second disc compiling rarities and previously unreleased material.

== Track listing ==
Disc 1 (Greatest Hits Compilation):

1. "Teen Angst (What the World Needs Now)"
2. "This Is Cracker Soul"
3. "I See the Light"
4. "Low"
5. "Get Off This"
6. "Sweet Potato"
7. "Euro-Trash Girl"
8. "Shake Some Action" (From Clueless soundtrack)
9. "Sweet Thistle Pie"
10. "I'm a Little Rocket Ship"
11. "Big Dipper"
12. "Seven Days"
13. "Been Around the World"
14. "Be My Love"
15. "Heaven Knows I'm Lonely Now"
16. "Eyes of Mary"

Disc 2 (Bonus CD listing):

1. "Surfbilly" (BBC session outtake)
2. "The Golden Age" (Live)
3. "You Ain't Going Nowhere" (Bob Dylan cover) (Live featuring Adam Duritz, Dan Vickrey and Joan Osborne)
4. "Hollywood Cemetery" (Previously unreleased)
5. "Whole Lotta Trouble" (From Empire Records soundtrack)
6. "I Want Out of the Circus" (Live)
7. "Steve's Hornpipe" (Early Cracker demo)
8. "Mr. Wrong" (Live)
9. "Sunday Train" (Kerosene Hat out-take)
10. "Lonesome Johnny Blues" (Live)
11. "Rainy Days and Mondays" (The Carpenters cover) (From If I Were a Carpenter tribute album)
12. "China" (Early Cracker demo)

"Surfbilly" comes from a Johnnie Walker session broadcast on BBC Radio 1 from Saturday 3 December 1994
