= O' Cracker Where Art Thou? =

Compilation album by Cracker, Leftover Salmon
- Released: May 6, 2003
- Genre: Bluegrass
- Length: 49:45
- Label: Pitch-a-tent
- Producer: David Lowery

Cracker chronology
Forever (2002)	O' Cracker Where Art Thou? (2003)	Countrysides (2003)

O' Cracker Where Art Thou? is a compilation album containing bluegrass versions of Cracker songs. The songs are played by two members of Cracker, David Lowery and Johnny Hickman, with musical accompaniment by Leftover Salmon.

== Reception ==
Professional ratings
Review scores
Source	Rating
AllMusic	3/5 stars
Jambands: The Complete Guide to the Players, Music, & Scene	4/5 stars

In a review for AllMusic, William Ruhlmann stated that the album "provides a different way of hearing Cracker's catalog that may help a new audience recognize the quality of the group's songs. And Leftover Salmon provides plenty of good picking."

Andrew Gilstrap, writing for PopMatters, commented: "it's hard to tell how seriously to take the record, but the band's sense of fun is so apparent that the listener's best choice is to probably just go along for the ride and not worry too much."

Brian Ferdman of Jambands.com wrote that the "combination of excellent songwriting, virtuoso musicianship, and ebullient energy plays out like a jamband's studio fantasy, and Leftover Salmon and Cracker should be commended for producing one of the best albums of the year."

== Track listing ==
1. "Get Off This"
2. "Euro-Trash Girl"
3. "Sweet Potato"
4. "Ms. Santa Cruz County"
5. "Mr. Wrong"
6. "Lonesome Johnny Blues"
7. "Low"
8. "Teen Angst (What the World Needs Now)"
9. "How Can I Live Without You?"
10. "Waiting for You Girl"
