= Countrysides (album) =

Studio album of cover songs by Cracker
- Released: October 7, 2003
- Genre: Alternative country
- Length: 40:03
- Label: BMG
- Producer: David Lowery; John Morand

Cracker chronology
O' Cracker Where Art Thou? (2003)	Countrysides (2003)	Greatest Hits Redux (2006)

Professional ratings
Review scores
Source	Rating
AllMusic	3.5/5 stars
Blender	3/5 stars

Countrysides is Cracker's sixth studio album. The album mostly consists of cover versions of country songs with one new original song, "Ain't Gonna Suck Itself". Before the release of the album, Cracker had been touring under the name "Ironic Mullet" at various dive bars across the American South and in Alaska.

== Track listing ==
No.	Title	Original artist (Year)	Length
1.	"Truckload of Art"	Terry Allen (1979)	3:42
2.	"Duty Free"	Ike Reilly (2001)	5:53
3.	"Up Against the Wall Redneck Mothers"	Ray Wylie Hubbard (1973)	4:09
4.	"Sinaloa Cowboys"	Bruce Springsteen (1995)	3:53
5.	"Family Tradition"	Hank Williams Jr. (1979)	4:42
6.	"The Bottle Let Me Down"	Merle Haggard (1966)	4:40
7.	"Reasons to Quit"	Merle Haggard (1983)	3:29
8.	"Buenas Noches from a Lonely Room"	Dwight Yoakam (1988)	3:46
9.	"Ain't Gonna Suck Itself"	Cracker (2003)	5:49

== Personnel ==
- David Lowery – vocals, guitar
- Johnny Hickman – lead guitar, vocals
- Brandy Wood – bass, vocals
- Frank Funaro – drums
