= Phil Jones (musician) =

American rock musician; drummer and percussionist

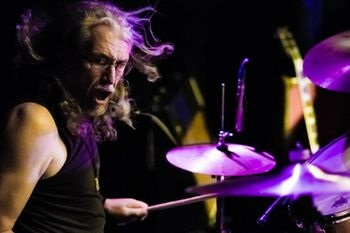
- Jones performing in 2021

Background information
- Born: 6 June 1948 (age 78); Oskaloosa, Iowa, U.S.
- Genres: Rock; pop
- Occupations: Musician; record producer
- Instruments: Drums; percussion
- Years active: 1969–present
- Website: www.philjonesdrums.com

Phil Jones (born June 6, 1948) is an American drummer, percussionist, and record producer. Jones played percussion with Tom Petty and the Heartbreakers in the early 80's both live and in the studio, while also playing drums and percussion on Tom Petty's solo album Full Moon Fever, which included the hit songs "Free Fallin'", "I Won't Back Down", and "Runnin' Down a Dream". His work outside the group includes playing on the Del Shannon albums Drop Down and Get Me and Rock On!. He currently runs his own recording studio in Los Angeles called 'Robust Recordings'.

== Early years ==
Jones was born in Oskaloosa, Iowa. He received no formal drum lessons but showed a keen interest in music during school, citing Al Jackson Jr. and Keith Moon as his favourite drummers. The first song he learned to play was Walk, Don't Run, which was written by Johnny Smith and later made famous by The Ventures. Later, he eventually moved to L.A and joined a blues style band with the harmonica player Lee Oskar. In 1969, Jones went on to jamming with some members of the rock band 'Stonehenge' which included John Weider of The Animals on guitar. Weider left Stonehenge and joined the English Rock group Family, leaving Jones and the remaining members to morph into Crabby Appleton with guitarist and lead vocalist Michael Fennelly. They went on to gain a Top 40 single entitled: 'Go Back' in 1970.

The band went on to open for other well established acts including ABBA, The Doors, Sly and the Family Stone, The Guess Who and Jethro Tull, but the second album in 1971 failed to achieve commercial success and they disbanded. Fennelly then moved to England to start a solo career, with Jones staying in L.A.

== Tom Petty and the Heartbreakers ==
From 1980 until 1984, Jones provided percussion for the band, both during tours and recording in the studio on the albums Hard Promises and Long After Dark. He was introduced to the band by the tour manager Richard Fernandez, who also happened to be Jones' drum tech in Crabby Appleton during the early years. Jones stated in the Drumhead interview that he believed he was hired due to a 'conflict with the band - a groove controversy' and that his role was to help 'smooth things out between different people.' Later in 1988, while Jones was visiting Heartbreakers guitarist Mike Campbell at his home studio for jamming sessions, Tom Petty called Campbell and asked if he could come over to record a song that he and Jeff Lynne had written called Free Fallin'. It was the first track recorded for the album, which also included George Harrison, Roy Orbison and Del Shannon among others providing contributions. Jones went on to play drums and percussion throughout the album which eventually became Full Moon Fever. Later in 1992, Jones again played on Petty's next album Wildflowers.

== Other work ==
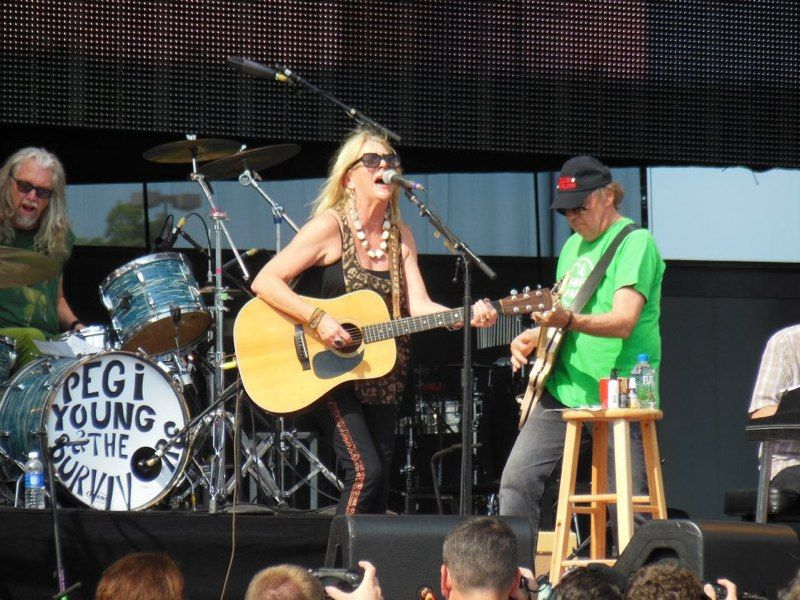
Jones at Farm Aid, USA; performing with Pegi and Neil Young

Jones went on to play with various others, including the rock band Cracker who had a #1 in the U.S. Modern Rock chart with "Teen Angst". He has also performed with many other notable musicians on live tours, including Joe Walsh, as well as the Black Crowes' former lead guitarist Marc Ford in the Neptune Blues Club. Jones played on Roy Orbison's 1988 album Mystery Girl on the single "You Got It" which was also recorded in Mike Campbell's garage studio in L.A. His percussion also features on the theme tune from Friends, entitled "I'll Be There for You", by the Rembrandts. Later, Jones also toured extensively with Neil Young's ex-wife, Pegi Young, under the band name the Survivors, along with bandmates Spooner Oldham, Kelvin Holly and Shonna Tucker.

== Collaborations ==
With Stevie Nicks

- Bella Donna (Atco Records, 1981)

With Tom Petty and the Heartbreakers

- Hard Promises (Backstreet Records, 1981)
- Long After Dark (Backstreet Records, 1982)
- Southern Accents (MCA Records, 1985)

With Bob Dylan

- Knocked Out Loaded (Columbia Records, 1986)

With Randy Newman

- Land of Dreams (Reprise Records, 1988)

With Roy Orbison

- Mystery Girl (Virgin Records, 1989)

With Tom Petty

- Full Moon Fever (MCA Records, 1989)
- Wildflowers (MCA Records, 1994)

With Cracker

- Cracker (Virgin Records, 1992)
- Kerosene Hat (Virgin Records, 1993)
- Gentleman's Blues (Virgin Records, 1998)

With Bash & Pop

- Friday Night Is Killing Me (Sire Records, 1993)

With The Rolling Stones

- Voodoo Lounge (Virgin Records, 1994)

With The Rembrandts

- L.P. (Atlantic Records, 1995)

With America

- Human Nature (Oxygen, 1998)

With Johnny Rivers

- Reinvention Highway (Shout! Factory, 2004)

With Bernard Fowler

- Friends With Privileges (Sony, 2006)

=== Solo albums ===
- 2012 ONE
