= Greenland (album) =

Studio album by Cracker
- Released: June 6, 2006
- Genre: Alternative rock
- Length: 1:03:11
- Label: Cooking Vinyl
- Producer: David Lowery, John Morand, Mark Linkous

Cracker chronology
Countrysides (2003)	Greenland (2006)	Sunrise in the Land of Milk and Honey (2009)

Professional ratings
Review scores
Source	Rating
Allmusic	4/5 stars

Greenland is the seventh studio album by U.S. rock band Cracker, featuring the singles "Something You Ain't Got," "Give Me One More Chance" and "Everybody Gets One For Free."

== Track listing ==
All songs written by David Lowery, except for where noted.

1. "Something You Ain't Got" (Rob McCutcheon, Zac Ray, Dwight Young)- 5:17
2. "Maggie" - 3:43
3. "Where Have Those Days Gone?" (Lowery, Matt Durant) - 4:12
4. "Fluffy Lucy" - 3:24
5. "The Riverside" - 4:21
6. "Gimme One More Chance" (Lowery, David Immerglück) - 4:14
7. "I'm So Glad She Ain't Never Coming Back" (Lowery, Immerglück, Johnny Hickman) - 1:54
8. "Sidi Ifni" (Lowery, Hickman) - 6:05
9. "I Need Better Friends" - 3:49
10. "Minotaur" - 4:27
11. "Night Falls" (Lowery, Hickman) - 5:24
12. "Better Times Are Coming Our Way" - 5:01
13. "Everybody Gets One for Free" (Lowery, Hickman, Durant, Stephen Koester) - 6:43
14. "Darling, We're Out of Time" (Lowery, Durant) - 4:36

== Main Personnel ==
- David Lowery – vocals, guitars
- Johnny Hickman – guitars, vocals
- Frank Funaro – drums, percussion
- Kenny Margolis – keyboards, piano, accordion
- Victor Krummenacher – bass
