= Eurotrash (term) =

Derogatory term used in USA

"Eurotrash" is a term for certain Europeans, particularly those perceived to be socialites, stylish, affluent, and/or effete. Eurotrash is often used as a collective term for such European migrants in the United States or other areas with a concentration of wealthy Europeans. Some consider Eurotrash a derogatory term, whereas others see it as a humorous, ironic description. There have been discussions in various forums to clarify its intent, with a majority view that the original meaning was not intended to imply impoverished or trashy Europeans, or be the European equivalent of "white trash".

Among the early printed uses of the term was in the early 1980s, when Taki Theodoracopulos, a wealthy Greek living in New York City, wrote a newspaper column titled "Eurotrash" in The East Side Express. The term was also used into the 1990s, with American band Cracker releasing a single called "Euro-Trash Girl". The song's narrator describes a dissolute life, drifting across Europe in pursuit of an "angel in black".

== See also ==
- Anti-Europeanism – Political term for opposition to Europe
- Eurotrash (TV series) – British television series on Channel 4
- Guido (slang) – Derogatory term for working-class Italian Americans
- Nouveau riche – Term to describe newly enriched persons
