= Sunrise in the Land of Milk and Honey =

Studio album by Cracker
- Released: May 5, 2009
- Genre: Alternative rock
- Length: 39:45
- Label: 429

Cracker chronology
Greenland (2006)	Sunrise in the Land of Milk and Honey (2009)	Berkeley to Bakersfield (2014)

Professional ratings
Review scores
Source	Rating
AllMusic	link
Glide Magazine	link
Paste	71% link
PopMatters	link
Spin	link

Sunrise in the Land of Milk and Honey is the eighth studio album by U.S. rock band Cracker. It was released May 5, 2009 on 429 Records. It is the final album to feature longtime drummer Frank Funaro and is notable for the contributions of many guest artists such as Adam Duritz, Patterson Hood and John Doe.

The song "Darling One" was originally released on the self-titled 1996 album by Susanna Hoffs. It was co-written with former Cracker member Davey Faragher in addition to Hoffs and David Lowery. "Friends" was originally released on Johnny Hickman's 2005 solo album Palmhenge. "Hey, Bret (You Know What Time It Is)" refers to Brett Netson of Built To Spill

== Track listing ==
All tracks are written by David Lowery Johnny Hickman, Sal Maida and Frank Funaro, except as noted.

No.	Title	Writer(s)	Length
1.	"Yalla Yalla (Let's Go)"		3:17
2.	"Show Me How This Thing Works"		2:51
3.	"Turn On, Tune In, Drop Out With Me"		4:11
4.	"We All Shine a Light"		3:39
5.	"Hand Me My Inhaler"		1:32
6.	"Friends"	Johnny Hickman	4:14
7.	"I Could Be Wrong, I Could Be Right"		4:51
8.	"Time Machine"		2:06
9.	"Hey Bret (You Know What Time It Is)"		4:52
10.	"Darling One"	Mark Linkous, David Lowery, Davey Faragher, Susanna Hoffs	4:44
11.	"Sunrise in the Land of Milk and Honey"		3:27
Total length:			39:36

iTunes Bonus Track
No.	Title	Length
12.	"Pretty On The Outside"	3:08

== Personnel ==
The following people contributed to Sunrise in the Land of Milk and Honey.

- David Lowery – vocals, guitar, keyboards
- Johnny Hickman – guitar, vocals, harmonica, keyboards
- Frank Funaro – drums, percussion
- Sal Maida – bass guitar
- John Doe – backing vocals on "We All Shine A Light"
- Adam Duritz – backing vocals on 'Darling One"
- Patterson Hood – backing vocals on "Friends"

== Chart performance ==
Chart (2009)	Peak position
The Billboard 200	189
Billboard Top Independent Albums	28
