= Forever (Cracker album) =

Studio album by Cracker
- Released: January 29, 2002
- Recorded: Sound of Music Studios, Richmond, Virginia
- Genre: Alternative rock
- Length: 58:25
- Label: Virgin
- Producer: David Lowery

Cracker chronology
Garage d'Or (2000)	Forever (2002)	O' Cracker Where Art Thou? (2003)

Forever is the fifth studio album by Cracker. The band performed "Shine" on the Late Show with David Letterman and "Merry Christmas Emily" on The Late Late Show.

Professional ratings
Review scores
Source	Rating
AllMusic	3.5/5 stars
Pitchfork	5.4/10

== Track listing ==
All songs written by David Lowery and John Hickman, except where noted.

1. "Brides of Neptune" (Lowery) - 4:57
2. "Shine" - 4:20
3. "Don't Bring Us Down" - 4:02
4. "Guarded by Monkeys" (Lowery) - 4:22
5. "Ain't That Strange" - 4:07
6. "Miss Santa Cruz County" - 4:29
7. "Superfan" (Hickman) - 3:56
8. "Sweet Magdalena of My Misfortune" (Lowery) -3:35
9. "Merry Christmas Emily" - 3:56
10. "Forever" - 4:13
11. "Shameless" - 3:44
12. "One Fine Day" - 6:54
13. "What You're Missing" (Lowery, Hickman, Kenny Margolis, Frank Funaro, Paul Rexrode, Brandy Wood) - 5:42

A version of this album, released in 2002. included a 2nd disc of 11 live tracks, entitled Hello, Cleveland! Live from the Metro.

== Musicians ==
Cracker:

- David Lowery – vocals, guitar, keyboards, bass
- Johnny Hickman – guitar, vocals, percussion
- Brandy Wood – bass, vocals
- Frank Funaro – drums, percussion, vocals
- Kenny Margolis – keyboards, accordion, vocals
