= Get Off This =

1994 single by Cracker

Single by Cracker

from the album Kerosene Hat
- Released: January 1994
- Genre: Alternative rock
- Length: 4:26
- Label: Virgin
- Songwriters: David Lowery; Johnny Hickman; Davey Faragher
- Producers: Don Smith; Cracker

Cracker singles chronology
"Low" (1993)	"Get Off This" (1994)	"Euro-Trash Girl" (1994)

Music video
- "Get Off This" on YouTube

"Get Off This" is a song by American rock band Cracker. It appears on their second studio album Kerosene Hat (1993), and was released in January 1994 as the album's second single. The song reached number 6 on the Billboard Modern Rock Tracks chart and number 18 on the Billboard Album Rock Tracks chart in 1994.

== Release and reception ==
"Get Off This" was the second single released from Kerosene Hat. Jason Gross of Rock and Roll Globe said it was "one of the band’s best songs" and that it "could be seen not only as a poke at hippies and idealists but also the 'fans' who are disappointed that Cracker ain’t Camper Van Beethoven."

== Music video ==
The music video for "Get Off This" features animation including rotoscoping, and was directed by Carlos Grasso.

== Charts ==
Chart (1994)	Peak position
Australia (ARIA)	158
UK Singles (Official Charts)	41
US Album Rock Tracks (Billboard)	18
US Modern Rock Tracks (Billboard)	6
US Bubbling Under Hot 100	2

== Release history ==
Region	Date	Format(s)	Label(s)	Ref.
United States	January 1994	Modern rock radio	Virgin	
United Kingdom	July 11, 1994	10-inch vinyl; CD; cassette	Virgin	
