= Cracker (album) =

Studio album by Cracker
- Released: March 10, 1992
- Recorded: Summer 1991
- Studios: Hollywood Sound and Cornerstone Recorders, Chatsworth
- Genres: Alternative rock, alternative country
- Length: 53:03
- Label: Virgin
- Producer: Don Smith

Cracker chronology
Cracker (1992)	Kerosene Hat (1993)

Singles from Cracker
- 1. "Teen Angst (What the World Needs Now)" Released: 1992; 2. "Happy Birthday to Me" Released: 1992

Cracker is the debut studio album by American rock band Cracker. It was released on March 10, 1992, by Virgin Records.

The album had sold more than 200,000 copies by April 1994. "Teen Angst (What the World Needs Now)" was released as a single and charted at number 1 on the U.S. Modern Rock Tracks.

== Critical reception ==
Professional ratings
Review scores
Source	Rating
AllMusic	4/5 stars
Chicago Tribune	4/4 stars
Robert Christgau	(neither)
Entertainment Weekly	A
The New Rolling Stone Album Guide	3/5 stars

Trouser Press wrote: "On Cracker, Lowery strips rock down to its muscular essence, avoiding any of the fancy flourishes Camper Van Beethoven used that might have hurt — or strengthened — this album of catchy, clever and disarmingly ironic songs."

== Track listing ==
1. "Teen Angst (What the World Needs Now)" (David Lowery) – 4:11
2. "Happy Birthday to Me" (Lowery)– 3:29
3. "This Is Cracker Soul" (Lowery, Johnny Hickman) – 3:38
4. "I See the Light" (Hickman, Lowery, Davey Faragher) – 5:11
5. "St. Cajetan" (Lowery, Hickman) – 5:22
6. "Mr. Wrong" (Hickman) – 4:34
7. "Someday" (Lowery, Hickman, Faragher) – 3:19
8. "Can I Take My Gun to Heaven?" (Lowery, Hickman) – 3:59
9. "Satisfy You" (Lowery, Hickman) – 3:27
10. "Another Song About the Rain" - (Hickman, Chris LeRoy) – 5:46
11. "Don't Fuck Me Up (With Peace and Love)" (Lowery, Hickman) – 3:08
12. "Dr. Bernice" (Lowery) – 6:20

== Personnel ==
Listed as INGREDIENTS on the liner notes.

- David Lowery – vocals, acoustic guitar
- Johnny Hickman – electric guitars, backing vocals, harmonica, lead vocals (track 10)
- Davey Faragher – bass, backing vocals

with:

- Rick Jaeger – drums
- Jim Keltner – drums (tracks 2, 3 & 6)
- Benmont Tench – keyboards
- Jeanie McClain – backing vocals (tracks 4 & 5)
- Phil Jones – percussion
- Alicia Previn aka Lovely Previn – fiddle

== Charts ==
Chart performance for Cracker
Chart (1992)	Peak position
Australian Albums (ARIA)	178
