= Berkeley to Bakersfield =

Studio album by Cracker
- Released: December 9, 2014
- Recorded: October 2013 – August 2014
- Genre: Alternative rock, country, punk
- Length: 70:54
- Label: 429 Records

Cracker chronology
Sunrise in the Land of Milk and Honey (2009)	Berkeley to Bakersfield (2014)

Professional ratings
Aggregate scores
Source	Rating
Metacritic	81/100
Review scores
Source	Rating
Allmusic	4/5 stars
American Songwriter	3.5/5 stars
Popmatters	8/10
Robert Christgau	A–

Berkeley to Bakersfield is Cracker's ninth studio album, released on December 9, 2014 on 429 Records. The release is a double album and was the band's first studio album in five years. The Berkeley album is influenced by punk and garage, while the Bakersfield album leans toward the band's "California country" side.

Part of the album was recorded with the lineup of Cracker's heyday. Bassist Davey Faragher and drummer Michael Urbano were members of the band when its most successful album Kerosene Hat was recorded.

The lead single "Waited My Whole Life" was released to radio in October 2014.

The album is named after the cities of Berkeley, California, and Bakersfield, California, located in Northern and Southern California respectively.

== Track listing ==
All tracks are written by Davey Faragher, Johnny Hickman, David Lowery, Michael Urbano, except as noted.

Disc 1 - Berkeley
No.	Title	Writer(s)	Length
1.	"Torches and Pitchforks"		2:12
2.	"March of the Billionaires"		3:38
3.	"Beautiful"		3:03
4.	"El Comandante"		3:07
5.	"El Cerrito"		5:04
6.	"Reaction"		2:39
7.	"You Got Yourself Into This"		3:14
8.	"Life in the Big City"		3:53
9.	"Waited My Whole Life"	Scooter Carusoe, Greg Lisher, Lowery	4:14
Total length:			31:04

All tracks are written by David Lowery except as noted.

Disc 2 - Bakersfield
No.	Title	Writer(s)	Length
1.	"California Country Boy"	Lowery, Trent Summar	3:14
2.	"Almond Grove"		4:36
3.	"King of Bakersfield"		4:57
4.	"Tonight I Cross The Border"		4:19
5.	"Get On Down The Road"		4:58
6.	"I'm Sorry, Baby"	Faragher, Hickman, Lowery	4:44
7.	"The San Bernardino Boy"	Hickman, Chris LeRoy	2:58
8.	"When You Come Down"		4:05
9.	"Where Have Those Days Gone?"	Lowery, Matt Durant	5:59
Total length:			39:50
