= The Unforgiven (band) =

American rock band

- Origin: Inland Empire, California
- Genres: Country rock
- Years active: 1985–1988
- Label: Elektra Records
- Past members: Steve Jones aka John Henry Jones; Johnny Hickman; Alan Waddington; Mike Finn; Mike Jones aka Just Jones; Todd Ross

The Unforgiven were a roots rock band that existed for four years during the 1980s. They were signed with a two-record deal to Elektra Records after a bidding war with Warner Bros. Records and several other labels. One label was willing to sign the band unseen and unheard. The band's attire and overall look was compared to that of actors in a Spaghetti Western; three-quarter length overcoats, dusty boots, and wide brimmed hats.

The lineup on the band's sole album (released in 1986) featured Steve Jones aka John Henry Jones (lead vocals, guitar), Johnny Hickman (guitar and vocals), Just Jones aka Mike Jones (guitar and vocals), Todd Ross (guitar and vocals), Mike Finn (bass and vocals) and Alan Waddington (drums and vocals). The self-titled album sold 50,000 copies. Steve Jones previously sang with and led the group The Stepmothers; two other members of The Stepmothers performed with a later incarnation of The Unforgiven, bassist Larry Lee Lerma and guitarist Jay Lansford. During the period that the band was active bassist Mike Finn was a teacher at an Orange County public school.

When asked during a Los Angeles Times interview about the record label's bidding war leader Steve Jones replied:

I can only tell you what they tell me. The timing seems to be right for a band that seems healthy. We play very aggressive music, but it's still pop. We're not trying to be overly political — we mean what we say, we don't say more than we mean...

In the same interview Craig Lee wrote that the band came into the Los Angeles rock scene with a "defiantly macho image". The tough look wasn't just an act. Before each rehearsal the group would run and lift weights. Johnny Hickman gave up smoking in order to join the band.

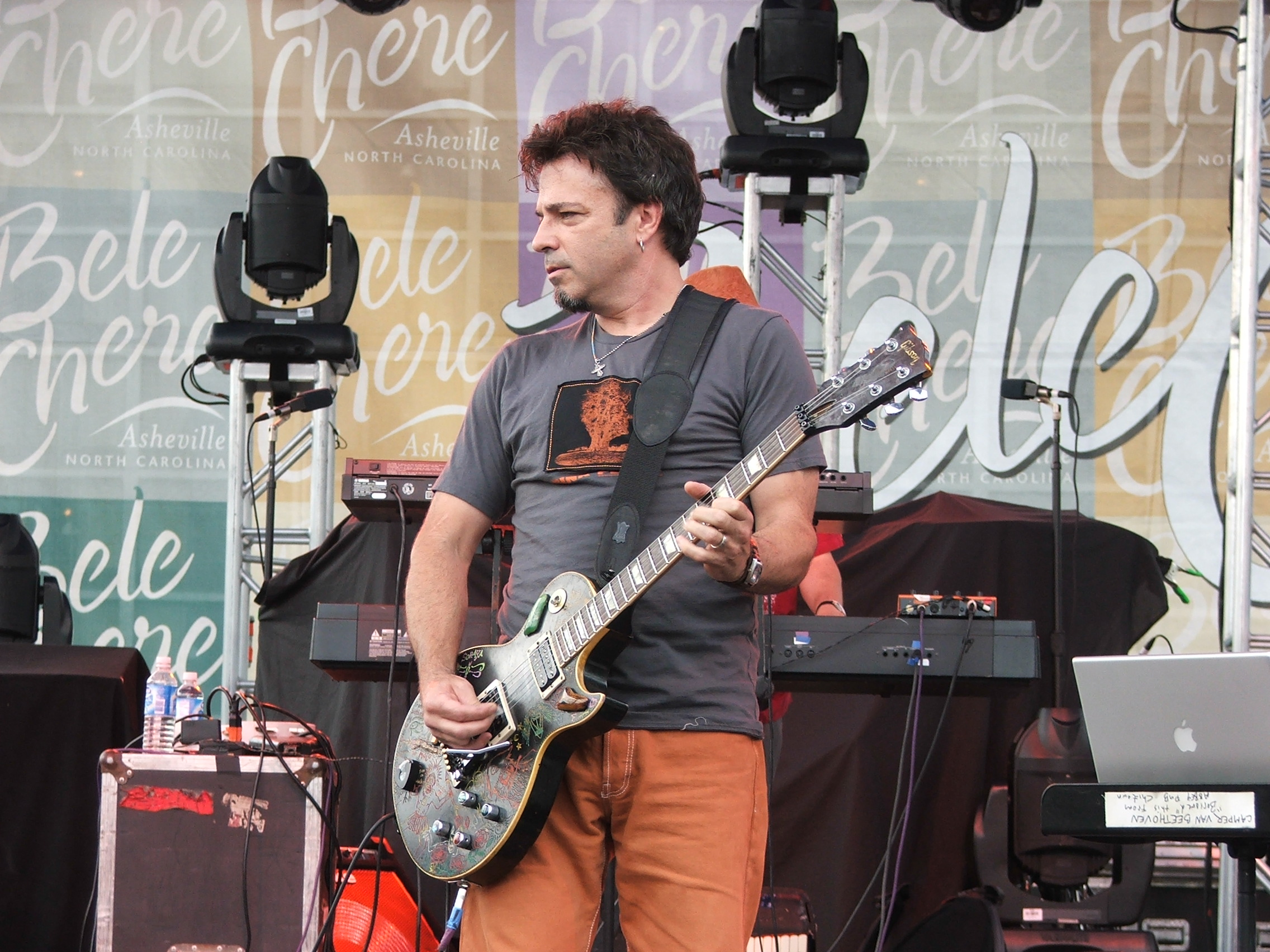
Johnny Hickman on stage with Cracker in Asheville NC, USA in July 2006

Drummer Alan Waddington stated in a May 24, 1985 interview at Madame Wong's West in Santa Monica:

It's great to know you're wanted, and that you're going to do something with a major label. The label has sunk a lot of money into us just trying to get a record made. Right now, that's their main concern.

The Unforgiven were unusual in their four-guitar lineup, their use of "gang vocals", their vintage cowboy image, and their embrace of a country-influenced roots rock sound that would find greater popularity after they broke up. They appeared at the 1986 Farm Aid II concert held at the Manor Downs horse track in Manor, Texas, and at the Farm Aid III show the following year held at Lincoln, Nebraska. The band was one of the earliest bands to have their music videos distributed on channels other than MTV, helping that format move beyond a single TV channel in genres other than mainstream pop/rock.

Alan Waddington moved on to perform with Desperation Squad from Pomona and is on staff at Citrus College in Glendora, California. Johnny Hickman became a member of Cracker, and Just Jones, Mike Finn, and Unforgiven roadie Tim Allyn perform with the band The Hickmen.

Steve Jones went on to write, direct, and compose in the music and television industries. He is credited with writing the "Days Like These" track off of Asia's Then & Now album from 1990. More recently he worked as series producer for Discovery Channel's first season of Pitchmen, and in 2010 co-founded a talent development agency.

The band reunited for what was called "one last show" during the 2012 Stagecoach Festival held at Indio, California. Several of the original band members, plus one guest fill-in, played several tracks including "Some Days", "Hang 'Em High", and "They Shoot Horses Don't They?". Jay Lansford (now living in Hanover (Germany) and playing lead guitar for the Simpletones and Ch. 3) along with Steve Jones and Alan Waddington (living in Azusa) all performed at the event.
