= Gentleman's Blues =

Studio album by Cracker
- Released: August 25, 1998
- Genre: Alternative rock
- Length: 73:02
- Label: Virgin
- Producer: Don Smith

Cracker chronology
The Golden Age (1996)	Gentleman's Blues (1998)	Garage d'Or (2000)

Gentleman's Blues is Cracker's fourth studio album. It was released in 1998 by Virgin Records.

Cracker frontman David Lowery said that the album's name arose when guitarist Johnny Hickman heard him playing a tune on the piano and observed that it sounded like an old Southern gentleman trying to play the blues.

== Critical reception ==
Professional ratings
Review scores
Source	Rating
AllMusic	3/5 stars
The New Rolling Stone Album Guide	2/5 stars

The Chicago Tribune wrote: "The gospel-tinged rocker 'Seven Days' showcases Lowery's way with a punchy chorus; 'James River' and the spooky title track find him delving deeper into dirgy, swampy blues; and Johnny Hickman continues to provide muscle and sinew with his crackling guitar leads and rootsier song contributions." The Rough Guide to Rock called the album a return "to American rock fundamentals with something approaching resignation, perhaps even nostalgia." The Los Angeles Times thought that "Hickman’s stellar, nuanced guitar work fluidly adapts to twangy rockers and dreamlike ballads, while Lowery’s nasal rasp gives voice to characters with good lives and bad, who invariably carry one of his most consistent messages: You control your destiny, so quit whining and face it."

== Track listing ==
1. "The Good Life" (Lowery, Hickman) - 3:50
2. "Seven Days" (Lowery, Hickman) - 4:24
3. "Star" (Lowery, Hickman) - 3:21
4. "James River" (Lowery) - 5:03
5. "My Life Is Totally Boring Without You" (Lowery, Hickman, Rupe) - 3:17
6. "Been Around the World" (Lowery) - 5:02
7. "The World Is Mine" (Lowery, Hickman) (from Gillette Fusion 2009 Commercial) - 3:45
8. "Lullabye" (Lowery) - 4:59
9. "Waiting for You Girl" (Lowery, Hickman) - 4:01
10. "Trials & Tribulations" (Hickman) - 3:01
11. "Wild One" (Lowery, Hickman, Rupe) - 4:25
12. "Hold of Myself" (Hickman) - 3:57
13. "Gentleman's Blues" (Lowery, Hickman) - 4:58
14. "I Want Out of the Circus" (Lowery) - 4:53
15. "Wedding Day" (Hickman) - 3:47
16. "Hallelujah" (Lowery) - 4:10
17. [Silence]
18. "1-202-456-1414" (the touch-tone phone number for the White House) - :08
19. [Silence]
20. "1-202-514-8688" (a U.S. Department of Justice phone number, formerly held by Ken Starr) - :08
21. [Silence]
22. "1-310-289-4459" (presently, the phone number for Beverly Hills psychotherapist Julia Kantor) - :12
23. [Silence]
24. "Cinderella" (Lowery) - 5:03

Tracks after 16 "Hallelujah" are all hidden tracks. Track 24 has vocals by LP, who also sings backup on "Star" and "Hallelujah."

== Personnel ==
- David Lowery – vocals, guitar
- Johnny Hickman – lead guitar, vocals
- Bob Rupe – bass, vocals
- Frank Funaro, Steve Jordan, Charlie Drayton – drums

Additional musicians

- LP – lead vocals (24)

== Chart performance ==
Chart (1998)	Peak position
The Billboard 200	182
