= Blink (1993 film) =

- Theatrical release poster
- Directed by: Michael Apted
- Written by: Dana Stevens
- Produced by: David Blocker
- Starring: Madeleine Stowe; Aidan Quinn; James Remar; Peter Friedman; Bruce A. Young; Laurie Metcalf
- Cinematography: Dante Spinotti
- Edited by: Rick Shaine
- Music by: Brad Fiedel
- Distributed by: New Line Cinema
- Release dates: October 1993 (Italy); January 26, 1994 (United States)
- Running time: 106 minutes
- Country: United States
- Language: English
- Budget: $11-15 million
- Box office: $21.7 million

Blink is a 1993 American neo-noir thriller film directed by Michael Apted and written by Dana Stevens. Starring Madeleine Stowe and Aidan Quinn, the film follows Emma Brody, the recipient of a corneal transplant who works with a police detective to track down a serial killer whose latest murder she inadvertently bore witness to.

Principal photography began on March 14, 1993 and took place in various Chicago locations. Chicago rock band The Drovers play a supporting role as themselves and contributed three songs to the soundtrack.

== Plot ==
Emma Brody, a violinist for a Celtic rock band in Chicago, has been blind for twenty years as the result of an attack by her abusive mother. She volunteers for an experimental surgery where her doctor, Ryan Pierce, equips her with corneal transplants. Though Emma's vision is partially restored, a side effect is "retroactive hallucination", meaning some things she sees don’t actually register in her brain until days after first witnessing them.

After hearing a noise from the apartment above and seeing a shadowy figure descend the building stairs, Emma goes to the police to file a report. However, her reliability is questioned because of her impaired vision. When Emma’s upstairs neighbor Valerie is later found murdered, Detective John Hallstrom, who earlier expressed skepticism about Emma, comes to rely on her for clues.

After an appointment with Dr. Pierce, Emma is walking in the parking garage of a hospital when her guide dog Ralphie begins barking and acting jittery. Emma also sees a crucifix pendant left on the garage floor. Ralphie gives chase to an assailant, but is accidentally hit by a car and must be taken to a veterinarian. Hallstrom starts to put more credence in Emma because the crucifix pendant she claims to have seen was found on the earlier victim’s body. He gets a policeman to stand watch at her door and follows her around town, taking a romantic interest in her. When Emma goes on a date with Dr. Pierce, Hallstrom enviously watches from afar.

After Dr. Pierce drops Emma off at her place, Hallstrom follows her back home where they express their mutual attraction to each other, embarking on a romance. Hallstrom’s fellow officers believe his relationship with Emma compromises his detective work. Meanwhile, the serial killer strikes again in Milwaukee. Hallstrom is rebuked by his superior for not having found the killer; to focus on his work, he distances himself from Emma and asks his colleague Ridgeley to look after her.

Emma goes to Hallstrom's office looking for him, prompting an argument between the couple about their relationship and ending with Emma storming off. She gets on the L train and sees visions of a man coming after her, but these turn out to be distorted visions as Ridgeley is the one chasing her, not the killer. Ridgeley finds Emma just as she faints on the train. Later, when seeing Dr. Pierce for an appointment, Emma becomes wary when she sees the doctor using surgical soap, as she remembers this was the scent when she encountered the killer.

Hallstrom finds medical bills addressed to Emma that erroneously lists the upstairs apartment as hers. He pieces together that the murderer meant to kill Emma, but ended up mistakenly killing her neighbor Valerie. He deduces that the killer is going after people who received the organs of Leslie Davison, a woman that the killer loved. Dr. Pierce shows up outside Emma’s apartment claiming the family of her organ donor wants to get in touch with her. After some hesitation, Emma gets the address from Pierce and heads to the location with Crowe, her police officer escort.

Emma knocks on the door of the house but nobody is home. She goes to tell Crowe who has parked in an empty garage, but she is ambushed by the killer, who has killed the cop in his car and locked the garage. The murderer, a former hospital orderly named Neal Booker, refers to Emma as Leslie, and taunts her. Emma fights back, gets ahold of his gun, and shoots, but her impaired vision makes it difficult. When Hallstrom is informed that Emma went to Leslie’s supposed address, he goes to the location with backup. After a prolonged chase around the garage, Emma manages to fatally shoot Booker. The cops hear the gunshots and bring Emma to safety.

After some questioning at the police station, Ridgeley offers to give Emma a ride home, but Hallstrom is waiting outside with a recovering Ralphie. Emma decides to walk home with Hallstrom and they share a kiss.

== Cast ==
- Madeleine Stowe as Emma Brody
- Aidan Quinn as John Hallstrom
- James Remar as Thomas Ridgely
- Peter Friedman as Ryan Pierce
- Bruce A. Young as Mitchell
- Paul Dillon as Neal Booker
- Laurie Metcalf as Candice
- Matt Roth as Crowe
- Tim Monsion as Mr. Tattersall
- Michael P. Byrne as Barry
- Anthony Cannata as Ned
- C. Winston Damon as Drovers singer and Trombone
- Sean C. Cleland as Drovers mandolin and Fiddle
- Dave Callahan as Drovers singer
- Jackie Moran as Jackie
- Sam Sanders as Bobby
- Greg Noonan as Frank
- Blake Whealy as Mark Tattersall
- Joy Gregory as Valerie Wheaton
- Lucy Childs as Margaret Tattersall
- Ted Gilbert as Ted
- Ed Cray as Suspect

== Reception ==
=== Critical reception ===
Blink holds a 67% rating on Rotten Tomatoes based on 27 critics' reviews, with an average rating of 5.7/10.

Praise went to Stowe's performance, with critics commending how it departs from "the old 'beautiful blind woman in peril' school of romantic thrillers". In a positive review, film critic Roger Ebert said Emma is "not your average movie blind woman, all trembling and sensitive. She's independent, tough, smart, cynical, and she likes to take a drink from time to time". He added: "Quinn and Stowe are able to bring to their characters a certain no-B.S. edge that I recognize as very Chicago", and ultimately called the film "an uncommonly good thriller" in a review that gave 3 and ½ stars out of four.

The New York Times's Janet Maslin praised the film's cast and visual effects, but criticized the screenplay, writing: "Blink resembles last year's Malice as a mystery with a compelling setup, good actors, a lot of well-evoked atmosphere and a solution so nutty it takes the breath away. The denouement of Blink is such a doozy that it winds up deflating the whole film, which otherwise might have sustained its sharp characterizations and gritty atmosphere." Peter Rainer of the Los Angeles Times described the plot as "so convoluted that even Hitchcock might have gotten tangled up in it". David Ansen of Newsweek wrote that Blink "walks a fine line, but if you're willing to accept it on its frankly formulaic terms, it delivers some good jolts".

The Miami Herald gave the film 2.5 stars (out of 4), saying: "After a number of red herrings, the identity of the killer turns out to be rather inconsequential -- and the motive somewhat farfetched. A shame, because the premise here, paired with an equally clever plot, would've made a dandy exercise in suspense. As it is, Blink is mildly engaging entertainment, nothing that will have you checking your watch, but nowhere near as good as its terrific trailers ("Things are not what they seem" and all that) make it out to be."

=== Box office ===
The film debuted at number 4 at the US box office. It grossed $16,696,219 in the US and Canada and $21.7 million worldwide.

=== Year-end lists ===
- Dishonorable mention – Glenn Lovell, San Jose Mercury News
- Dishonorable mention – William Arnold, Seattle Post-Intelligencer

=== Home media ===
The film was released on VHS on July 13, 1994, by New Line Home Video.

== Awards and nominations ==
- Karlovy Vary International Film Festival Crystal Globe Award - Michael Apted (nominated)
- Edgar Allan Poe Award for Best Motion Picture - Dana Stevens (nominated)
