= The Golden Age (Cracker album) =

Studio album by Cracker
- Released: April 2, 1996
- Genre: Alternative rock
- Length: 48:17
- Label: Virgin
- Producers: Dennis Herring; David Lowery

Cracker chronology
Kerosene Hat (1993)	The Golden Age (1996)	Gentleman's Blues (1998)

Singles from The Golden Age
- 1. "I Hate My Generation" Released: 1996; 2. "Nothing to Believe In" Released: 1996; 3. "Sweet Thistle Pie" Released: 1996

The Golden Age is the third studio album by American alternative rock band Cracker. It was released on April 2, 1996, by Virgin. Three singles were released from the album: "I Hate My Generation," "Nothing to Believe In," and "Sweet Thistle Pie."

== Critical reception ==
Professional ratings
Review scores
Source	Rating
AllMusic	2.5/5 stars
Los Angeles Times	2.5/4 stars
The New Rolling Stone Album Guide	2/5 stars

The Los Angeles Times wrote: "Although irritatingly self-indulgent and arrogant at times, Lowery occasionally borders on brilliance. It’s possible that someone in the future will delve deeply into The Golden Age and find the portent of Sly Stone’s There’s a Riot Going On. For now, the album just feels slightly uninspired." Alternative Rock called it "drily disappointing."

== Track listing ==
All tracks written by David Lowery and Johnny Hickman, except where noted.

1. "I Hate My Generation" – 2:57
2. "I'm a Little Rocket Ship" – 3:23
3. "Big Dipper" (Lowery) – 5:40
4. "Nothing to Believe In" (Lowery, Hickman, Bob Rupe) – 3:25
5. "The Golden Age" – 3:44
6. "100 Flower Power Maximum" (Lowery, Hickman, Rupe) – 2:39
7. "Dixie Babylon" – 7:09
8. "I Can't Forget You" (Lowery) – 4:08
9. "Sweet Thistle Pie" – 5:00
10. "Useless Stuff" – 2:19
11. "How Can I Live Without You" – 3:27
12. "Bicycle Spaniard" – 4:26

== Charts ==
Chart performance for The Golden Age
Chart (1996)	Peak position
Australian Albums (ARIA)	136
U.S Billboard 200	63

== Musicians ==
Cracker

- David Lowery – lead & backing vocals, guitar, synthesizer, Peavey analog filter, mellotron, handclaps, string arrangements, bass
- Johnny Hickman – lead guitar, backing vocals, guitar three hand, synthesizer, baritone guitar, talkbox, harmonica
- Bob Rupe – bass, synthesizers, synthesized bass, backing vocals
- Charlie Quintana – drums

Guests

- Dennis Herring – acoustic guitar, mellotron, string arrangements
- Charlie Gillingham – organ
- David Immergluck – pedal steel, backing vocals
- Johnny Hott – percussion, programming
- David Campbell – string arrangements
- Eddie Bayers – drums, percussion
- Jim Cox – piano
- Rob Hajacos – fiddle
- John Hobbs – piano
- Tony Maimone – bass
- Joan Osborne – backing vocals

Strings

- Arranged & conducted by David Campbell
- Bob Becker, Denyse Buffum – viola
- Larry Corbett – cello, viola
- Armen Garabedian – violin
- Peter Kent – violin, concert master
- Sid Page – violin, concert master
- Suzie Katayama – cello, contractor
- Bob Peterson – violin
- Katia Popov – violin
- Michelle Richards – violin
- Bonnie Douglas Shure – violin
- Paul Shure – violin, theremin

Production

- Produced By Dennis Herring & David Lowery
- Joe Chiccarelli – engineer, recording
- Wayne Cook – engineer
- Chris Fuhrman – engineer, overdubs
- Richard Hasal – engineer, overdubs
- Amy Hughes – assistant engineer
- Jim Labinski – assistant engineer
- Marc Mann – engineer
- Skidd Mills – assistant engineer
- John Morand – assistant engineer
- Csaba Petocz – engineer
- Steve Sisco – mixing
- Andy Wallace – mixing
- Howie Weinberg – mastering
- David Work – digital manipulation
