= The Drovers =

- The Drovers, 1998 at Chicago's Annoyance Theatre; L to R: David Callahan, Paul Bradley, Mike Kirkpatrick and Merritt Lear

Background information
- Genres: Celtic music, psychedelic rock, progressive rock, folk
- Years active: 1988–2002
- Label: Tantrum Records/Thermometer Sound Surface
- Members: Mike Kirkpatrick; Dave Callahan
- Past members: Sean Cleland; Tim Larson; Kathleen Keane; Jackie Moran; Ike Reilly; Chris Bain; Todd Allison; Merritt Lear; Winston Damon; Paul Bradley; Liam Moore; Brendan O'Shea; Emily Pitcher
- Website: thedrovers.com

The Drovers were a Chicago-based rock band whose original songs were influenced by Irish traditional dance music.

Founded by Sean Cleland in 1988, the group recorded four albums and soundtrack music for the motion pictures, Backdraft and Blink. Songwriters Mike Kirkpatrick (guitar) and Dave Callahan (bass, vocals) drew from Irish rhythms to craft songs that became increasingly psychedelic over a 12-year period until the band ceased performing in September 2002. Kirkpatrick, in particular, composed songs that featured traditional Irish reels jigs of his own. Callahan's songs, while obviously influenced by Celtic/American folk music, tended toward a less ethnic-sounding psychedelia.

== History ==
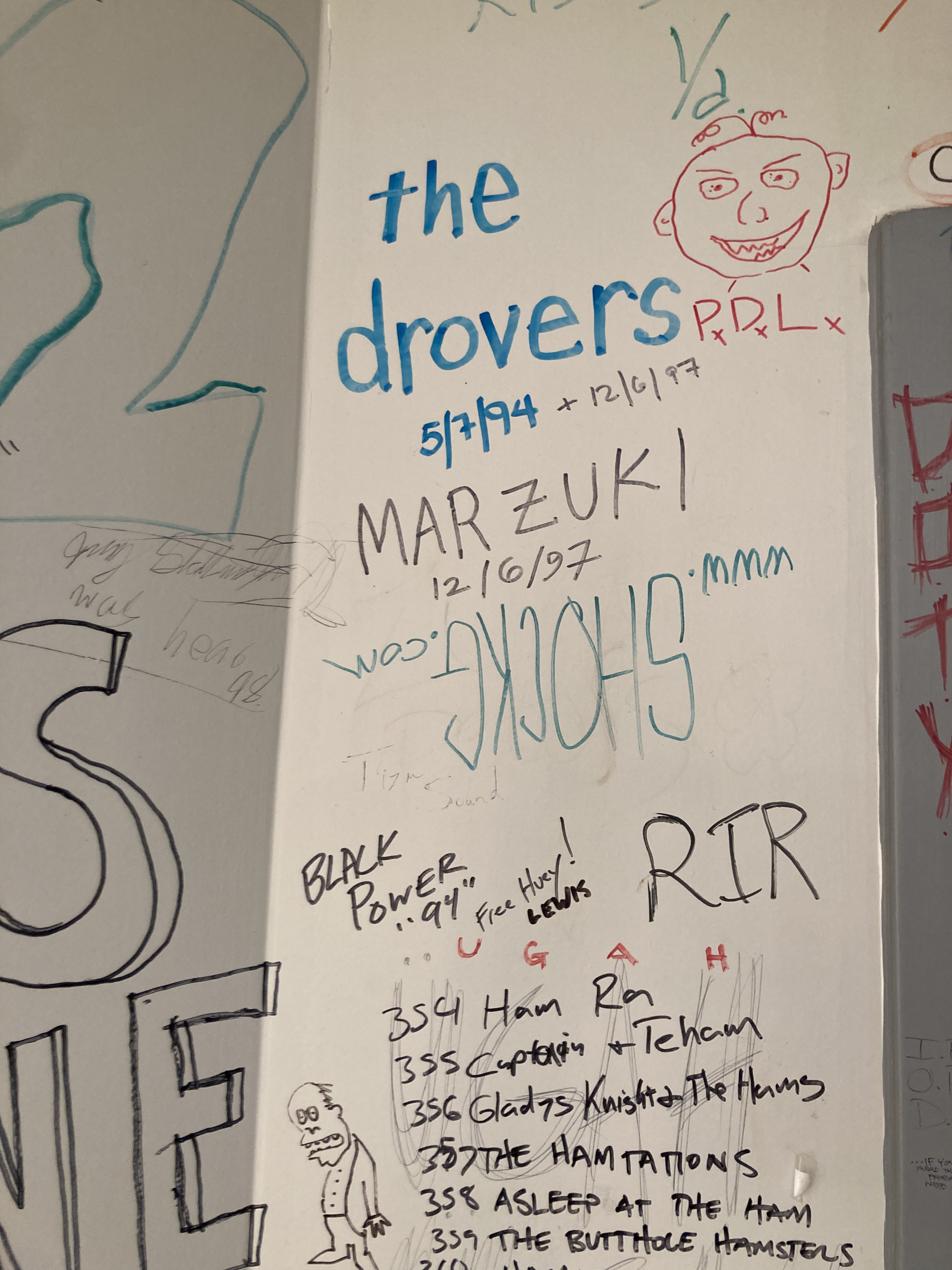
Green room wall signed when playing Grinnell College's Harris Center

The band was founded in Chicago by Irish fiddler Sean Cleland. The Drovers' 1991 first studio album, World of Monsters, featured Kathleen Keane on flute, vocals and button accordion, Jackie Moran drums, Dave Callahan lead vocals and bass and Mike Kirkpatrick guitar. "Book of Songs" brought the Drovers their first commercial radio exposure on WXRT in Chicago. The songs, "Boys and the Babies" and "When Fortune Turns Her Wheel", would later be re-recorded on the Blink soundtrack.

The Drovers were awarded Illinois Entertainer's Best Unsigned Band award in 1991.

The next decade was spent touring the college rock circuit, while they gained worldwide exposure through the release of 'Blink (1993), in which they appear onscreen as themselves, the band toured exclusively in North America.

The follow-up to Monsters was the 1993 EP Kill Mice Elf, the centerpiece of which is the cut, "She's as Pretty as Brian Jones Was". The disc includes contributions from vocalists Yvonne Bruner (Big Hat), Atalee Judy and Chantal Wentworth, and cellist Eric Remschneider.

In 1995 the Drovers released the Steve Albini-produced Little High Sky Show, and their increasingly psychedelic sound took many fans by surprise. The album includes Minneapolis musicians Robin Anders (Boiled in Lead) and Linda Pitmon (Steve Wynn and the Miracle Three, Baseball Project), plus Chicago percussionist Doug Brush.

While critically acknowledged and never officially dissolving, the Drovers eventually stopped performing and Callahan formed the Stroby Alliance with former Drover Tim Larson.

Bradley co-founded Eventric, a provider of concert tour logistics support services.

Lear, O'Shea, Moore, Keane, Bain and Moran continue to tour and record as solo artists in the traditional and pop music world.

Cleland started the band bohola (www.bohola.com) with piano accordion player Jimmy Keane and released four albums on the Shanachie label. He is now the director of The Irish Music School of Chicago (www.irishmusicschool.com) and teaches and performs throughout North America and Ireland.

The Drovers are featured in the suspense film, Blink (1993), which stars Madeleine Stowe as a blind woman who plays fiddle for the group, and becomes entangled in a murder investigation where her blindness and subsequent surgery to correct it are at the forefront of the storyline. The film co-stars Aidan Quinn and Laurie Metcalf. The Drovers' music comprises the vast majority of the film's soundtrack.

In addition to the core six musicians: Cleland, Keane, Kirkpatrick, Callahan, Moran and Bain, the group also recorded and toured with Stone Damon, Ike Reilly, Emily Pitcher, Todd Allison, Merritt Lear and Tim Larson.

Mike Kirkpatrick, The Drovers guitarist, died at his home in Chicago on August 27, 2020 after battling colon cancer. He was 65.

== Discography ==
- World of Monsters – 1991
- Kill Mice Elf – 1992
- Little High Sky Show – 1995
- Soundtrack from the motion picture Blink – 1994
- The Inner Flame – 1996
- Plus – 1997
- The Drovers – 2001
- Archives – 2013
