= Sal Maida =

American bass guitarist (1948–2025)

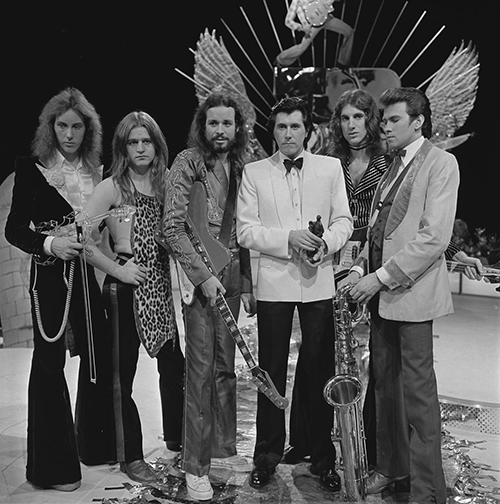
- Maida (second from right) with Roxy Music in 1973

Background information
- Born: July 29, 1948; New York, United States
- Died: February 1, 2025 (aged 76) New York, United States
- Instrument: Bass
- Formerly of: Roxy Music; Milk 'N' Cookies; Sparks; Cracker; The Brandos
- Spouse: Lisa Burns

Salvatore Maida (July 29, 1948 – February 1, 2025) was an American bass guitarist. Raised in Little Italy, New York City, he moved to London after completing college, where he played with Roxy Music, Milk 'N' Cookies, Sparks, Cherie Currie, Cracker, the Brandos, and a Lovin' Spoonful tribute band. He also authored the 2014 memoir Four Strings, Phony Proof, and 300 45s and co-authored the 2023 book The White Label Promo Preservation Society Vol 2: More Flop Albums You Ought to Know.

== Life and career ==
Maida was born in New York on July 29, 1948. He was raised in Little Italy and started playing in the local band The Ouija before joining The Five Toes. He graduated from Fordham University with a BA in economics. After Fordham, he traveled to London. He found a job there working in a record store. While working at the record store in London, he met Paul Thompson, the drummer of Roxy Music. He went on to join the band on their 1973 Stranded Tour. His contract with the band ended after the tour.

In 1974, he became a member of Milk 'N' Cookies, a band from Long Island. The band's power-pop sound was influential in the early punk scene. In 1976 he recorded the album Big Beat with Sparks who had the same manager and the same producer as Milk 'N' Cookies. Later that year, they toured with Patti Smith Group who had just released their Radio Ethiopia album. In 1977 Maida played the bass on Beauty's Only Skin Deep, the debut solo album of Cherie Currie, the former lead vocalist of The Runaways. In 1980 he teamed up with new wave solo vocalist Lisa Burns and arranged her single Love Wanted. Later on, in 1983, they released the EP After Hours by going under the band name Velveteen. Milk 'N' Cookies debut album Milk 'N' Cookies was reissued in the mid-2000s, prompting the band to reunite and play occasional shows during the following decade.

In 2006, Maida joined the band Cracker with David Lowery, Johnny Hickman, and Frank Funaro. Maida and the rest of the band co-wrote most of the material on the band's 2009 album, Sunrise in the Land of Milk and Honey. As of 2010, Maida played the bass on six albums recorded by the British songwriter Edward Rogers. In 2014, Maida authored the memoir Four Strings, Phony Proof, and 300 45s, which detailed his experience of being in the music scene as the major changes which brought the end of the psychedelic era occurred. In an article about the book's release, Tim Scott of Vice stated that he "may not have a Wikipedia page" but he was "one of the coolest 70s rock stars you've never heard of". In 2015 he started a Lovin' Spoonful tribute band called A Spoonful of Lovin' and in 2017 and 2018 he toured with the band The Brandos in Germany and the Netherlands.

In 2023, Maida authored The White Label Promo Preservation Society Vol 2: More Flop Albums You Ought to Know with Mitchell Cohen and 53 friends of his. The book examines 100 albums which were not commercially successful, "flopping" by not making the top 100 in Billboard. Maida died due to complications of a fall in New York, on February 1, 2025, at the age of 76.
