= Thayer Sarrano =

American singer-songwriter

- Born: Thayer Sarrano
- Genres: Shoegaze, psychedelic folk, psych rock, gothic folk
- Occupations: Musician, Composer, singer-songwriter, session musician, producer, painter
- Instruments: Vocals, guitar, pedal steel, piano, organ, synthesizer, vibraphone, percussion
- Years active: 2007–present
- Website: www.thayersarrano.com thayersarrano.bandcamp.com

Thayer Sarrano is a singer-songwriter, multi-instrumentalist and visual artist. Besides her solo work, she has collaborated with numerous bands as a touring member or session player, and is strongly affiliated with the music scene of Athens, Georgia. She has released five albums, all of which have received positive reviews, with her music being referred to as shoegaze, psychedelic folk and Southern Gothic.

== Early life and career ==
Sarrano grew up in a small town in southern Georgia after having lived in a monastic seminary as a preschooler. She studied piano at Berry college and then moved to Athens, GA, having enrolled at UGA as an art student. There, musically educated since the age of 3 and having shown an earlier interest in poetry, she took up songwriting and started collaborating with local musicians, which led to her releasing solo albums, King (2009) and Lift Your Eyes to the Hills (2012), Shaky (2015), Wings Alleluia (2019) and a career as a session musician recording with several other acts (Discography) and touring with of Montreal, Kuroma and Dead Confederate. She also toured for several years as a member of Cracker, and Camper Van Beethoven, Sarrano is also a counselor at Camp Amped, a camp for teenage musicians held at Nuçi's Space, to which a portion of the sales of her second album is donated.

== Musical style and reception ==
According to Sarrano, she was influenced by the music she was familiar with while growing up, church chanting being her first contact with music, along with gospel, folk and southern rock, with later influences like Black Sabbath, Velvet Underground and Neil Young. She also mentions Rilke and other poets, and the connection between her songwriting and painting processes.

Reviewing King, Americana UK has called her "the new queen of shoegaze", noting the "spookiness" achieved with the lap steel, repetitive lyrics, dissonance and Sarrano's voice, and compared her to Mazzy Star and Mary Margaret O'Hara.

Lift Your Eyes to the Hills features a heavy use of reverb, echoes, multi-tracked vocals, organ and pedal steel, flowing and diffuse sounds creating a "dark and dreamy" style (it "is made of layers of shifting sound strata"), mixed with repetitive, personal experience based lyrics and spiritual imagery. It was chosen in the Top 10 Records of the Year (so far) by Flagpole Magazine (8/12), Top 10 Records of 2012 by Chris Sikich, City Paper, Philadelphia, and Top 20 Records of 2012 by WuOG Radio. Shaky was on numerous top lists as well as flagpole magazine music award 2016. Wings Alleluia (2019) was recorded with Athens Cowboy Choir and features more classical choral elements with a dark and dreamy atmosphere. Sarrano released a live album with her arrangements for chamber strings at the Georgia Theatre 2017.

== Discography ==
=== As Thayer Sarrano ===
- Ancient Future (2023) – LP
- Wings Alleluia (2019) – LP
- Acoustic Chamber: Live from the Georgia Theatre (2017) live
- I Will Never Be Used to Your Beauty (2017) 7inch
- Shaky, (2015) LP
- Lift Your Eyes to the Hills, (2012) – LP
- King, (2009) – LP
- The Bend, (2011) – single for Groninger Museum

=== Collaborations ===
- Alessi's Ark, The Still Life (2013, Bella Union Records) – Keys
- Anders Parker, (2013) – Keys
- Band of Horses, Georgia single, split with CeeLo Green (2010, Columbia) – Keys
- Bloodkin, One Long Hustle (2013, Terminus) – Vocals
- The Corduroy Road, (2013) – Piano
- Dead Confederate, Peyote People, (2013, Spiderbomb Records) – Vocals, In the Marrow (2013, Spiderbomb Records) – Vocals
- Dennis Ellsworth, Dusk Dreams (2012) – Keys, Vocals
- Dare Dukes, Bone Thugs and China Dolls (2012, Mazarine) – Piano
- Futurebirds, Hampton's Lullaby (2010, Autumn Tone Records) – Piano, Baba Yaga, (2013, Fat Possum Records/VL4L) – Piano
- Harouki Zombi, Objet Petit A (2012, Polyvinyl) – Vocals
- Hope for agoldensummer, Life inside the body, (2012, Mazarine) – Piano, Vocals
- Jim White, Sounds of the Americans (2011) – Vocals
- Justin Evans, The Owls and the Hounds (2009) – Keys, Vocals
- Kishi Bashi, 151a (2012, Joyful Noise Recordings) – Vocals
- Lera Lynn, Have You Met Lera Lynn (2011, Slow Records) – Piano
- Little Francis, Don't Leave Me Now podcast – Piano, Vocals
- Matt Hudgins, Hitmakers, Volume 1 (2011) – Pedal Steel
- Paul Gaines, The Beat (2010) – Keys, Vocals
- St. Francis, (2013, Chromatone) – Piano
- T.Hardy Morris, Audition Tapes (2013, Dangerbird Records) – Vocals, Keys
- Alabama Tribute Compilation (2013, Thirty Tigers) – Pedal Steel, Vocals, Organ
- Tia Madre, Makeout Mountain (2013) – Vocals
- Timber, Sad and Scrawled (2010) – Piano, Album Art
- Union Pulse, Angel on a wire (2007) – Vocals
