= Teen Angst (What the World Needs Now) =

Single by Cracker

from the album Cracker
- Released: 1992
- Recorded: Summer 1991 at Hollywood
- Genre: Alternative rock
- Length: 4:11
- Label: Virgin Records
- Songwriter: David Lowery
- Producer: Don Smith

Cracker singles chronology
"Teen Angst (What the World Needs Now)" (1992)	"Happy Birthday to Me" (1992)

"Teen Angst (What the World Needs Now)" is a song by the rock band Cracker. Released in 1992, it was the first single from their debut album Cracker, and went to #1 on the US Modern Rock chart.

The song was later released on the compilation albums, Garage D'Or and Get On with It: The Best of Cracker. Re-recordings of the song appear on the album Greatest Hits Redux and — accompanied by bluegrass band Leftover Salmon — O' Cracker Where Art Thou?.

== Track listings ==
1. "Teen Angst (What the World Needs Now)" - 4:11
2. "Can I Take My Gun to Heaven?" - 3:50
3. "China" - 3:09

== Chart positions ==
Chart (1992)	Peak position
Australia (ARIA)	148
Canada Top Singles (RPM)	65
US Modern Rock Tracks (Billboard)	1
US Album Rock Tracks	27

== See also ==
- List of Billboard Modern Rock Tracks number ones of the 1990s

== In popular culture ==
On June 5, 2012, the song was released as downloadable content for the video game Rock Band 3.
