= Anti-Europeanism =

Political term for opposition to Europe

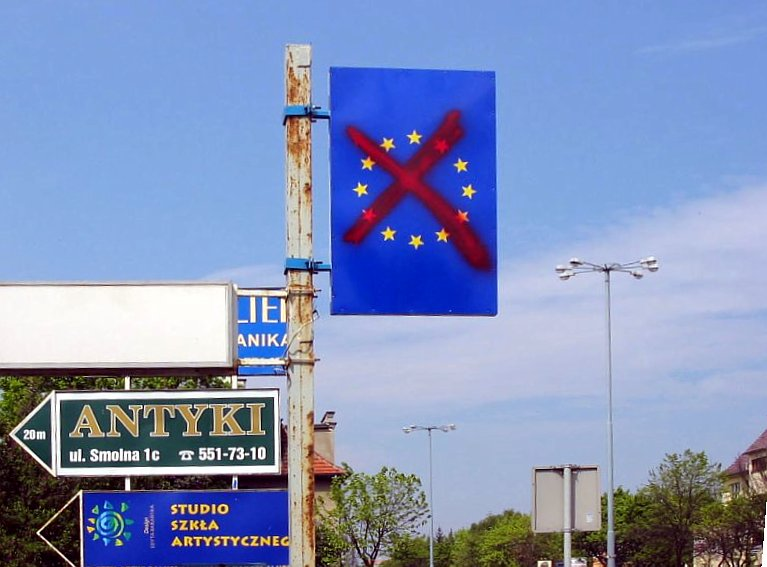
A vandalised EU sign in Sopot, Poland, 2003

Anti-Europeanism, Anti-European sentiment, and Europhobia are political terms used in a variety of contexts, implying sentiment or policies in opposition to Europe.

In the context of racial or ethno-nationalist politics, this may refer to the dislike, hatred, prejudice, mistreatment and/or discrimination against/toward the culture or peoples of Europe. In the shorthand of "Europe" (a British usage, standing for the European Union or European integration), it may refer to Euroscepticism, criticism of policies of European governments or the European Union. In the context of United States foreign policy, it may refer to the geopolitical divide between "transatlantic", "transpacific" and "hemispheric" (Pan-American) relations.

In social sciences, anti-Europeanism is defined as opposition to the European Union and to European integration for political, cultural and ideological reasons. Scholars distinguish it from Euroscepticism, which is generally defined as a mistrust of the EU, its policies and its objectives.

== Usage ==
=== United Kingdom ===
In the United Kingdom, "Europhobia" refers to negative attitudes towards mainland Europe, either in the context of anti-German sentiment or of anti-Catholicism, or, more recently, of Euroscepticism in the United Kingdom.

=== United States ===
American exceptionalism in the United States has long led to criticism of European domestic policy (such as the size of the welfare state in European countries) and foreign policy (such as European countries that did not support the 2003 US invasion of Iraq).

Under the presidency of Donald Trump, critiques of NATO, particularly its funding, became a prominent issue. Although NATO includes non-European members such as the United States, Canada, and Turkey, the alliance is often perceived, especially by Trump and many Americans, as primarily a European defense treaty aimed at safeguarding European nations.

Trump's main criticism centered on the disproportionate financial burden shouldered by the United States, which effectively funds the majority of NATO's military expenditures. He argued that many NATO member states fail to meet their commitment to allocate at least 2% of their GDP to defense spending, a benchmark agreed upon by all members.

This critique gained renewed attention during the Russian invasion of Ukraine, which exposed the underfunding of military capabilities in several NATO countries. Their inability to immediately provide substantial military aid to Ukraine highlighted longstanding concerns about reliance on U.S. defense resources. Many American critics view NATO as a vestige of the Cold War, where the U.S. continues to bear the cost of protecting Europe, particularly against threats from Russia, without equitable contributions from other member states.

=== In Europe ===
In European social science, anti-Europeanism is usually defined as one of three major types of negative attitudes, alongside Eurocriticism and Euroscepticism. Its defining characteristic is the rejection of European integration and European unity This distinguishes it from Euroscepticism, which describes mistrust towards the EU integration project, its institutions and its politics. It also is different from Eurocriticism, which refers to criticism of the EU's actors and policies Contrarily to anti-Europeanism, Euroscepticism and Eurocriticism do not go as far as to reject the European project. Anti-Europeanism can be observed on both sides of the political spectrum but has, in recent literature, been associated mainly with far right and nationalist discourse It has also been used in populism, through framing the EU as a corrupt elite.

==== Anti-Europeanism and ideology ====
Anti-Europeanism does not belong to any specific side of the political spectrum. On the left of the political spectrum, anti-Europeanism is usually an opposition to the European project's capitalist and globalist nature. This was especially true in the 1960s and 1970s, in the opposition with the EEC. For example, the EEC and the integration project were given the name capitalist club by left-wing parties across Europe The EU and entities alike were truly seen as a tool for liberalism and globalization which weakened national protection for workers.

On the right side of the political spectrum, anti-Europeanism can also be observed. Firstly, concerns about sovereignty, such as control over the economy or immigration can lead to anti-European attitudes. On the far right, there are also concerns over the countries' national identity and culture. In Eastern European countries, some individuals and parties argue that the EU's liberal values and its international nature are not compatible with their country's values and national identity, and that therefore, the integration cannot work.

The anti-European discourse can also be associated with populism, where far-right politicians promote the idea of a duality between the EU's "corrupt elites" and the "true, hard-working people". Anti-Europeanism can also be observed alongside discourses on nativism, the idea that individuals indigenous to a land should be given greater social protection and have their interests promoted over those of immigrants. In this view, the EU is seen as detrimental to the country's autonomy over its borders. Former Hungarian Prime Minister Viktor Orbán is an example of a politician using anti-elitist discourse coherent with anti-Europeanism.

Anti-Europeanism in Europe is sometimes justified through the framing of the European Union as a detimentral to democracy or sovereignty, particularly on issues relating to decisions made in the European Parliament. For example, concern for sovereignty is considered to be one of the main reasons behind the "Leave" vote during the 2016 Brexit referendum.

==== Anti-Europeanism and political concerns ====
Anti-Europeanism can be defended through political arguments, namely national sovereignty. Anti-European sentiment is often a reaction to a country's perceived loss of control over their national politics. Some consider the EU as a source of democratic deficit, in reference to its technocratic aspect, which is perceived as taking the power even further from the citizens. Decisions taken by the European Parliament, on issues like immigration, for example, are also seen by some as a violation of the country's sovereignty. Concern for sovereignty is considered to be one of the main reasons behind the "Leave" vote during the 2016 Brexit referendum.

==== Anti-Europeanism and cultural concerns ====
In other instances, anti-Europeanism is explained through cultural arguments. Those arguments show concern for the impact of European integration on the country's national identity, culture and values. In some instances, anti-Europeanism is related to nativism and xenophobia. Many European national parties argue that the EU constitutes a "replacing power", seeking to replace the ethnic majority through immigration (see the Great Replacement conspiracy theory). Some far-right discourse also perceives the EU as a threat to Europe's historical Christian culture. In other instances, the integration is seen as an homogenization that erases local specificities. In some countries, the EU and its values are seen as too "liberal", and incompatible with the country's national identity, therefore making integration impossible.

== See also ==
- Anti-Americanism – Dislike of the United States and Americans
- Anti-Western sentiment – Hatred or opposition towards the Western world or its people
- European values – Norms and values that Europeans have in common
- Eurocentrism – Worldview centred on or biased towards Western civilization
- Eurotrash (term) – Derogatory term used in USA
- Occidentalism – Caricature and stereotypes of Westerners in response to Orientalism
- Pan-European identity – Personal identification with Europe
- Stereotypes of Americans – Generalized representations of US people
