= Greatest Hits Redux =

Compilation album by Cracker
- Released: February 21, 2006
- Recorded: December 2005
- Genre: Alternative rock
- Length: 67:08
- Label: Cooking Vinyl

Cracker chronology
Countrysides (2003)	Greatest Hits Redux (2006)	Greenland (2006)

Professional ratings
Review scores
Source	Rating
AllMusic	3/5 stars

Greatest Hits Redux is a compilation album by the American rock band Cracker featuring re-recordings of previously released material.

The album was released on February 21, 2006 on the Cooking Vinyl label, the same day their previous label Virgin Records issued Get On With It: The Best of Cracker, which featured the original versions of many of the same songs, but was released without the band's permission or cooperation. In a similar fashion, the Redux versions of the songs undercut the price of the originals on iTunes, resulting in greater sales for the Redux versions. Nine of the 13 songs that appear here are also on the Virgin compilation.

Since these songs were re-recorded, there are some subtle differences scattered throughout such as changed lyrics or different instrument fills. The one new song, "Something You Ain't Got", would appear a few months later in the year on their Greenland release.

== Track listing ==
1. "Teen Angst (What the World Needs Now)"
2. "I See the Light"
3. "Mr. Wrong"
4. "Low"
5. "Get Off This"
6. "Lonesome Johnny Blues"
7. "Euro-Trash Girl"
8. "Sweet Thistle Pie"
9. "Big Dipper"
10. "The World Is Mine"
11. "Duty Free"
12. "Ain't Gonna Suck Itself"
13. "Something You Ain't Got"
