= Low (Cracker song) =

1993 single by Cracker

Single by Cracker

from the album Kerosene Hat
- B-side: "Nostalgia"
- Released: August 13, 1993
- Genre: Alternative rock; grunge
- Length: 4:35
- Label: Virgin
- Songwriters: David Lowery; Johnny Hickman; Davey Faragher
- Producers: Don Smith; Cracker

Cracker singles chronology
"Happy Birthday to Me" (1992)	"Low" (1993)	"Get Off This" (1994)

Music video
- "Low" on YouTube

"Low" is a song by American rock band Cracker. It was released in August 1993, as the lead single from their second studio album, Kerosene Hat. The song became a sleeper hit, reaching number 64 on the US Billboard Hot 100 chart in May 1994. Its biggest success was on the rock charts, reaching number three on the Billboard Modern Rock Tracks chart in November 1993 and number five on the Billboard Album Rock Tracks chart in March 1994. The music video, directed by Carlos Grasso, portrays lead singer David Lowery losing a boxing match with actress and comedian Sandra Bernhard.

In 2013, Lowery posted an essay on his website The Trichordist focused on "Low" in the era of streaming music. The headline was "My Song Got Played on Pandora 1 Million Times and All I Got Was $16.89, Less Than What I Make from a Single T-Shirt Sale!" The post went viral and has become a reference point in the debate over the economics of streaming music.

== Background ==
David Lowery has said that the band's label made him write a letter to radio stations denying that the song was about drugs, claiming that the repeated phrase "being stoned" was really "being stone." Lowery paraphrased a label executive as telling him, "I don't believe you and neither will anyone else, but there needs to be deniability and this is what we're gonna say."

== Track listings ==
- UK CD single
1. "Low" – 4:36
2. "I Ride My Bike" – 6:32
3. "Sunday Train" – 3:42
4. "Whole Lotta Trouble" – 2:26
- US CD single
1. "Low" – 4:35
2. "Sunday Train" – 3:42
3. "Whole Lotta Trouble" – 2:26
4. "I See the Light" – 5:13
5. "Steve's Hornpipe" – 2:13

== Charts ==
=== Weekly charts ===
Chart (1993–1994)	Peak position
Australia (ARIA)	63
Scottish Singles Sales (Official Charts)	58
UK Singles (Official Charts)	40
UK Airplay (Music Week)	38
US Billboard Hot 100	64
US Album Rock Tracks (Billboard)	5
US Modern Rock Tracks (Billboard)	3
US Cash Box Top 100	75

=== Year-end charts ===
Chart (1993)	Position
US Modern Rock Tracks (Billboard)	17

Chart (1994)	Position
US Album Rock Tracks (Billboard)	19

== Release history ==
Region	Date	Format(s)	Label(s)	Ref.
United States	August 13, 1993	Alternative rock radio	Virgin	
Australia	May 16, 1994	CD	Virgin	
United Kingdom	May 16, 1994	7-inch vinyl; 10-inch vinyl; CD; cassette	Virgin	

== Cover versions ==
In 2017, Lydia Lunch and Cypress Grove covered "Low" on their album Under the Covers.

== In popular culture ==
"Low" was featured in the film The Perks of Being a Wallflower and its accompanying soundtrack. In addition, it was used in The Wolverine and episodes of Hindsight and Rectify. The B-side track "Whole Lotta Trouble" was featured on the soundtrack of the 1995 film Empire Records.
