= Kerosene Hat =

Studio album by Cracker
- Released: August 24, 1993
- Recorded: February 25 – March 25, 1993
- Studio: The Soundstage (Pioneertown, California)
- Genres: Alternative rock, alternative country, grunge
- Length: 72:43
- Label: Virgin
- Producer: Don Smith

Cracker chronology
Cracker (1992)	Kerosene Hat (1993)	The Golden Age (1996)

Singles from Kerosene Hat
- 1. "Low" Released: August 13, 1993; 2. "Get Off This" Released: January 1994; 3. "Euro-Trash Girl" Released: August 1994

Professional ratings
Review scores
Source	Rating
AllMusic	4/5 stars
Chicago Tribune	3/4 stars
Los Angeles Times	3/4 stars
The New Rolling Stone Album Guide	2/5 stars
Spin	0.5/1 star
The Village Voice	(dud)

Kerosene Hat is the second studio album by American rock band Cracker. It was released on August 24, 1993, through Virgin Records. The album reached number 1 on Billboard's Top Heatseekers chart and number 59 on the Billboard 200 album chart. It contains the singles "Low", "Get Off This" and "Euro-Trash Girl", which helped Cracker gain widespread notice.

== Background and recording ==
Following the release of their self-titled debut album, Cracker entered the studio in 1992 intending to record their next album completely live to tape. This idea was eventually scrapped, but four live-in-the-studio tracks were released later that same year as the Tucson EP.

Seeking a new recording location away from the distractions of Los Angeles and their record company, the band scouted out a few sites, including a Palm Springs house that once belonged to Frank Sinatra. Eventually, they happened upon a derelict soundstage in Pioneertown, California, which was part of an old movie set once used to shoot Western films and TV shows.

As guitarist Johnny Hickman recalls: "It really wasn't that much of a sound stage. It was more of a barn. There were holes in the wall you could see through and it was just a huge, huge barn basically. But it was just big enough to open the doors and drive a mobile recording truck into. So we got all of our equipment and the truck into the barn and shut the door and for the next six weeks proceeded to make Kerosene Hat."

Recording took place from February 25 to March 25, 1993. The weather was cold, and the band salvaged old mattresses and other material from the junkyard to insulate the makeshift studio.

According to frontman David Lowery, the album title comes from the band's early days in Richmond, Virginia. Lowery lived with Hickman in an old dilapidated house whose only source of heat came from two kerosene heaters. To buy more kerosene meant a cold walk to a nearby gas station, so before leaving the house, Lowery would bundle up and put on an old wool hunting cap – his "kerosene hat." "To this day," says Lowery, "the smell of kerosene reminds me of the poverty and the wistful hope we had for our music."

== Music and lyrics ==
The leadoff track from the album, "Low," had a major impact on the album's success. After Hickman started playing the song's signature riff during a soundcheck in Portland, Oregon, the song came together very quickly. Upon release it became – as noted by Spin – "a ubiquitous signpost of the alternative-as-the-new-mainstream era". Author David Maine calls "Low" the signature song of the summer of 1993, as rock radio added it to heavy rotation and the band's visibility increased. It peaked at #3 on the Modern Rock Radio charts. The track "Whole Lotta Trouble," recorded during the Kerosene Hat sessions and released as the b-side of the "Low" CD single, was also featured on the soundtrack of the 1995 film Empire Records.

Contributing to the song's success was a noir-ish, black-and-white video shot by director Carlos Grasso, which was added to MTV's Buzz Bin. In the video, Lowery spars with comedian Sandra Bernhard in a boxing ring and gets knocked out. Grasso claims that during the video shoot, Lowery insisted that Bernhard's punches be real – which meant his face was "all puffy" from the hits by the end of the shoot.

Lowery described "Low" as "part Wizard of Oz, part Flowers of Evil", while NME called it "grunge noir." Due to perceived drug references in the song's lyrics, Lowery was asked by Virgin Records to write a letter to radio stations swearing that there was nothing drug-related about the song at all. According to the letter, the lyric "being stoned" was actually "being stone".

The second single from the album, "Get Off This," was written in response to naysayers who accused Cracker of selling out and making music that was more mainstream than Lowery's previous band, Camper Van Beethoven. Thematically speaking, the song declares the band's independence and desire to write songs that come from an honest place. The song peaked at #6 on the Modern Rock Radio charts.

Written in a New Jersey hotel room, "Euro-Trash Girl" tells the story of a lonely young man in Europe who suffers through a series of humiliating episodes. Lowery created the song's central character and the other band members suggested additional ideas to the story. Having spent time in Europe, Hickman noted mischievously: "Some of these things [in the song] happened to us, some not." Even before Kerosene Hat was released, the song had become a live fan favorite. So despite protests from Virgin Records of putting too much material on the album, the band surreptitiously included the song, along with "I Ride My Bike," as hidden tracks during mastering. It was producer Don Smith's idea to make "Euro-Trash Girl" track 69.

"Sick of Goodbyes" was co-written with Mark Linkous of Sparklehorse, and was later re-recorded and released as a single from that band's album, Good Morning Spider.

The final song on the album proper, "Loser," is a Grateful Dead cover. Jerry Garcia once told Lowery and Hickman that he approved of their version of the song.

== Legacy ==
In the post-Nirvana climate of early '90s alternative music, Kerosene Hat went gold and would be Cracker's most popular album to date. Twenty years after the album's release, webzine Spectrum Culture noted, "In the cases when both music and lyrics are on the mark – and there are many – the record achieves something close to greatness."

Says Lowery: "We've always been a country roots-rock band. We've always leaned on American roots stuff, whether it's soul, blues or country... Fortunately, our sound somehow fit into modern rock radio back when grunge had taken over the entire world." Hickman adds, "We kind of snuck in the back door by being a band that had something to say and were lucky enough to write a catchy three-minute song."

Pioneertown, where Kerosene Hat was recorded, still holds a special place for the band members, as Cracker hosts a music festival there each year. In 2011, the band paid tribute to its landmark album by performing it live in its entirety.

== Track listing ==
No.	Title	Writer(s)	Length
1.	"Low"	David Lowery, Johnny Hickman, Davey Faragher	4:36
2.	"Movie Star"	Lowery	3:33
3.	"Get Off This"	Lowery, Faragher, Hickman	4:26
4.	"Kerosene Hat"	Lowery	5:36
5.	"Take Me Down to the Infirmary"	Lowery	4:05
6.	"Nostalgia"	Lowery, Faragher, Hickman	3:34
7.	"Sweet Potato"	Faragher, Hickman, Lowery	3:16
8.	"Sick of Goodbyes"	Mark Linkous, Lowery	3:10
9.	"I Want Everything"	Lowery	5:53
10.	"Lonesome Johnny Blues"	Hickman	2:48
11.	"Let's Go for a Ride"	Lowery, Hickman, Faragher	3:08
12.	"Loser"	Jerry Garcia, Robert Hunter	6:11
15.	"Hi-Desert Biker Meth Lab" (non-consecutive track)	Lowery, Hickman, Faragher	0:41
69.	"Euro-Trash Girl" (hidden track)	Lowery, Hickman, Faragher, Joey Peters	8:04
88.	"I Ride My Bike" (hidden track)	Lowery, Hickman	6:34
99.	"Kerosene Hat" (outtake; hidden track)	Lowery	1:23

Notes

- Tracks 13 and 14, 16 to 68, 70 to 87 and 89 to 98 are hidden/blank tracks of four, five or six seconds of silence. Tracks 69 and 88 were previously included on the Tucson EP.
- The album was recorded at a soundstage built in an old barn in Pioneertown, California.
- The last words on the album are "Leather Tush" uttered by Bugs Salcido.

== Personnel ==
Cracker

- David Lowery – vocals, rhythm guitar, acoustic guitar
- Johnny Hickman – lead guitar, backing vocals, lead vocals (10)
- Davey Faragher – bass, backing vocals
- Michael Urbano – drums

Additional musicians

- Phil Jones – percussion, drums (8, 9)

Production

- Don Smith – producer, engineer, mixing
- Rich Hasal – engineer, mixing
- Marty Brumbach – second engineer
- Stephen Marcussen – mastering

== Charts ==
Chart performance for Kerosene Hat
Chart (1994)	Peak position
US Billboard 200	59
US Top Heatseekers (Billboard)	1
Australian Albums (ARIA)	123

== Certifications ==
Region	Certification	Certified units/sales
United States (RIAA)	Gold	500,000^{^}
^{^} Shipments figures based on certification alone.
