= Cracker (band) =

American rock band

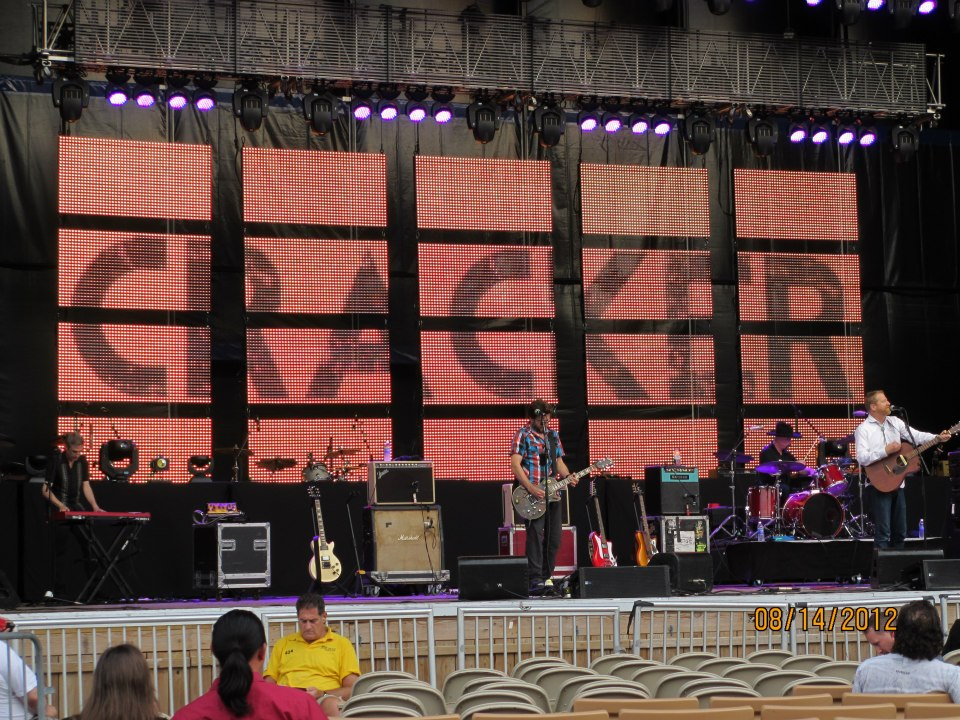
- Cracker performing at Jones Beach Theater in 2012

Background information
- Origin: Richmond, Virginia, U.S.
- Genres: Rock; country; grunge; punk
- Years active: 1990–present
- Labels: Virgin, Cooking Vinyl, Savoy / 429 Records
- Members: David Lowery; Johnny Hickman; Bryan Howard; CoCo Owens
- Past members: Davey Faragher; Phil Jones; Michael Urbano; Bruce Hughes; David Lovering; Joey Peters; Johnny Hott; Bob Rupe; Charlie Quintana; Kenny Margolis; Brandy Wood; Victor Krummenacher; Sal Maida; Frank Funaro; Thayer Sarrano; Matt "Pistol" Stoessel; Paul McHugh; Go Weatherford
- Website: crackersoul.com

Cracker is an American rock band formed in 1990 by lead singer David Lowery and guitarist Johnny Hickman. The band's first album Cracker was released in 1992 on Virgin Records; it included the single "Teen Angst (What the World Needs Now)", which went to No. 1 on the U.S. Modern Rock chart. The band's follow-up, the 1993 album Kerosene Hat included the hit songs "Low", "Get Off This" and "Euro-Trash Girl". Cracker has released nine studio albums and several compilations, collaborations, solo projects and live albums. The band mix influences and sounds from rock, punk, grunge, psychedelia, country, blues and folk.

== History ==
=== 1990s ===
Shortly after Lowery's former group Camper Van Beethoven disbanded in 1990, he began demoing material along with boyhood friend guitarist Johnny Hickman. After moving from Redlands, California to Richmond, Virginia, Lowery and Hickman recorded a demo tape, later nicknamed Big Dirty Yellow Demos by the group's fans, which included early versions of songs that appeared on later albums. They eventually chose the name Cracker and teamed up with fellow Redlands bass guitarist Davey Faragher. A brief tour with Virginia drummer Go Weatherford followed.

By 1991, the newly formed band had signed a recording contract with Virgin Records and enlisted the help of several drummers/percussionists (Jim Keltner, Michael Urbano and Phil Jones), issuing its first album, Cracker, in 1992. From the album came radio hit "Teen Angst (What the World Needs Now)", which peaked at No. 1 on Modern Rock Tracks, and a second single entitled "Happy Birthday to Me." The album went on to sell more than 200,000 copies.

A year later, Cracker issued its best-selling album, Kerosene Hat. The album included hit singles "Low" and "Get Off This" (both with official music videos directed by Carlos Grasso), as well as a cover of the Grateful Dead's "Loser." The album sold almost half a million copies that year and eventually almost reached platinum status. Urbano performed on Kerosene Hat and toured with Cracker before leaving the band, along with Faragher. After a short spell with Bruce Hughes, Lowery and Hickman added Bob Rupe, formerly of The Silos, as bass guitarist and Charlie Quintana (Bob Dylan, The JuJu Hounds) on drums. In 1993, Cracker contributed the song "Good Times Bad Times" to the Encomium: A Tribute to Led Zeppelin album. Initially, the band had recorded a rendition of "When the Levee Breaks" but it was deemed "too weird."

Three years later, The Golden Age was released, with "I Hate My Generation" as the lead single. However, the music scene was shifting away from guitar-driven alternative rock, and although critically acclaimed, the album sold only moderately. Following the long-term additions of drummer Frank Funaro and keyboard player Kenny Margolis, the band returned in 1998 with Gentleman's Blues, with "The Good Life" as the lead single. Although the album received only a lukewarm critical response, it solidified an ever-growing and devout following both in the United States and Europe who referred to themselves as "Crumbs."

In 1995 the song "Whole Lotta Trouble," co-written by Hickman and Chris LeRoy, was used in the film Empire Records. The same year, Cracker's cover of the Flamin' Groovies song, "Shake Some Action," was used in the teen romantic-comedy Clueless.

Camper Van Beethoven unexpectedly re-formed in 1999, and in 2004 released the critically acclaimed New Roman Times. During this time, Hickman released a first solo recording, Palmhenge, which received "Voices Choice" accolades in The Village Voice by the rock critic Robert Christgau and a positive review in Blender magazine. Since then, Lowery has performed in both Cracker and Camper Van Beethoven.

=== 2000s ===
A compilation album called Garage D'Or was released in 2000, with one disc composed of greatest hits and three new songs, and another of out-takes, soundtrack contributions, demos and other obscurities. Rupe departed in January 2000 and was replaced by bass guitarist Brandy Wood. In 2002, the band released its next studio album, Forever which, once again, met with limited commercial success.

The group left Virgin in 2003 with the independent release Countrysides, composed of eight country and western covers and one new original song. A collaboration with the bluegrass band Leftover Salmon, Oh Cracker, Where Art Thou? (2003), contained bluegrass versions of many Lowery and Hickman compositions. In 2005, Cracker and Camper Van Beethoven started an annual three-night "Campout" at Pappy and Harriet's Pioneertown Palace in Pioneertown, California, close to where Lowery and Hickman met, in which they and several other bands perform, including sets by Cracker and Camper band members performing their own music. Previous years' guests have included Roger Clyne, John Doe, Neko Case, Ike Reilly, Ryan Bingham, Vermillion Lies, Jason Molina and Magnolia Electric Co, Built To Spill, Brant Bjork and the Bros, Clem Snide, Gram Rabbit and The Bellrays.

With Camper Van Beethoven bass guitarist Victor Krummenacher replacing Wood, the band released the studio album Greenland on June 6, 2006, and continued to tour extensively. After the departures of Margolis and Krummenacher, the band's lineup stabilized in 2007 around Hickman, Lowery, Funaro and new bass guitarist Sal Maida, who had played with Roxy Music.

Cracker released a new studio album entitled Sunrise in the Land of Milk and Honey to positive reviews on May 5, 2009. It was the band's first chart on the Billboard 200 in more than a decade, after having sold more than 3,000 copies in a week. This was in part due to the Triple A chart success of the album's lead single, "Turn On, Tune In, Drop Out With Me," which was used in the television show Californication.

=== 2010s ===
In January 2011, Lowery released his first solo album, The Palace Guards, on 429 Records. In March, Cracker announced Campout East, the east coast counterpart to their Campout festival, to be held in Crozet, Virginia. The first Campout East was held at Misty Mountain Camp Resort and was co-hosted by Sons of Bill. The second Campout East took place in Buena Vista, Virginia at Glen Maury Park on June 1–2, 2012.

Johnny Hickman released a second solo album, Tilting, in July 2012, while Cracker's song "Low" appeared in the 2012 film The Perks of Being a Wallflower and again in The Wolverine and an episode of Hindsight.

Drummer Frank Funaro was unable to tour due to an injury to his arm that sidelined him for all of 2014.

In July 2014, a revival of the Kerosene Hat era lineup toured China. Lowery and Hickman were joined on the tour by original bassist Davey Faragher and former drummer Michael Urbano. Faragher and Urbano also joined the band in recording roughly half of the double album Berkeley to Bakersfield. The other half was recorded with an entirely new lineup that also became the current touring lineup. The album was released on December 9, 2014, with "Waited My Whole Life" released as a single.

In December 2015, Lowery (along with Camper Van Beethoven) filed a class action lawsuit against music streaming service Spotify, alleging that Spotify knowingly and unlawfully reproduced and distributed copyrighted recordings without obtaining proper music licenses. On 12 March 2018, drummer Charlie Quintana died from a heart attack. In February 2025, bass guitarist Sal Maida died. On 3 March 2025, Bob Rupe died aged 68.

== Band members ==
=== Current members ===
- David Lowery – vocals, guitar (1990–present)
- Johnny Hickman – lead guitar, vocals (1990–present)
- Bryan Howard – bass guitar (2014–present)
- Carlton "Coco" Owens – drums (2014–present)

=== Former members ===
- Davey Faragher – bass guitar, vocals (1990–1993, 2014)
- Phil Jones – drums, percussion (1990–1992 – session)
- Go Weatherford – drums (1990–1991 – touring)
- Michael Urbano – drums (1992–1993, 2014)
- Joey Peters – drums (1992 – session)
- Bruce Hughes – bass guitar (1993–1994)
- David Lovering – drums (1993–1994)
- Johnny Hott – drums (1994–1995)
- Bob Rupe – bass guitar, vocals (1994–2000; d. 2025)
- Charlie Quintana – drums (1995–1996; d. 2018)
- Frank Funaro – drums (1996–2014)
- Kenny Margolis – keyboards, accordion (1996–2007)
- Brandy Wood – bass guitar, vocals (2000–2004)
- Victor Krummenacher – bass guitar, vocals (2004–2006)
- Sal Maida – bass guitar (2006–2014; d. 2025)
- Thayer Sarrano – keyboards, vocals (2014–2015)
- Matt "Pistol" Stoessel – pedal steel guitar (2014–2023)
- Paul McHugh – keyboards, organ (2018–2022)

== Discography ==
=== Studio albums ===
List of albums, with selected chart positions
Title	Album details	Peak chart positions		
Title	Album details	US	AUS	UK
Cracker	Released 1992; Label: Virgin	—	178	—
Kerosene Hat	Released 1993; Label: Virgin	59	123	44
The Golden Age	Released 1996; Label: Virgin	63	136	—
Gentleman's Blues	Released 1998; Label: Virgin	182	—	—
Forever	Released 2002; Label: Virgin	—	—	—
Countrysides	Released 2003; Label: BMG	—	—	—
Greenland	Released 2006; Label: Cooking Vinyl	—	—	—
Sunrise in the Land of Milk and Honey	Released 2009; Label: 429 Records	189	—	—
Berkeley to Bakersfield	Released 2014; Label: 429 Records	—	—	—
"—" denotes release did not chart or become certified.

=== Compilations, live albums, and EPs ===
Year	Title	Type	Label
1993	Tucson	EP	Virgin
1995	Bob's Car	Compilation	Fan Club Release
2000	Garage D'Or	Compilation	Virgin
2002	Hello, Cleveland! Live from the Metro	Live	Virgin
2003	O' Cracker Where Art Thou?	Live	Pitch-a-tent
2005	We Don't Suck Live: Live at Wavefest	Live	Pitch-a-tent
2006	Greatest Hits Redux	Compilation	Cooking Vinyl
2007	Berlin (Live in Berlin, December 2006)	Live	Pitch-a-tent
2010	Live at the Rockpalast Crossroads-Festival	Live	Blue Rose Records
2024	Alternative History: A Cracker Retrospective	Compilation	Cooking Vinyl

=== Singles ===
Year	Title	Chart positions					Album
Year	Title	US	US Alt.	US Main.	AUS	UK	Album
1992	"Teen Angst (What the World Needs Now)"	—	1	27	148	150	Cracker
1992	"Happy Birthday to Me"	—	13	—	157	—	Cracker
1993	"Low"	64	3	5	63	40	Kerosene Hat
1994	"Get Off This"	— (Note: "Get Off This" did not chart on the Billboard Hot 100, but peaked at no. 2 on the Bubbling Under Hot 100 chart.)	6	18	158	41	Kerosene Hat
1994	"Euro-Trash Girl"	—	25	—	162	—	Kerosene Hat
1996	"I Hate My Generation"	— (Note: "I Hate My Generation" did not enter the Billboard Hot 100, but peaked at number 67 on the Hot 100 Airplay chart.)	13	24	122	—	The Golden Age
1996	"Nothing to Believe In"	—	32	40	—	—	The Golden Age
1996	"Sweet Thistle Pie"	—	—	33	—	—	The Golden Age
1998	"The Good Life"	—	—	—	—	—	Gentleman's Blues
1998	"The World Is Mine"	—	—	—	—	—	Gentleman's Blues
2002	"Shine"	—	—	—	—	—	Forever
2002	"Merry Christmas, Emily"	—	—	—	—	—	Forever
2006	"Something You Ain't Got"	—	—	—	—	—	Greenland
2006	"Gimme One More Chance"	—	—	—	—	—	Greenland
2006	"Everybody Gets One for Free"	—	—	—	—	—	Greenland
2009	"Turn On Tune In Drop Out with Me"	—	—	—	—	—	Sunrise in the Land of Milk and Honey
2014	"Waited My Whole Life"	—	—	—	—	—	Berkeley to Bakersfield
2014	"Almond Grove"	—	—	—	—	—	Berkeley to Bakersfield

Other compilations

- The Virgin Years (1995) with Camper Van Beethoven
- Get On with It: The Best of Cracker (2006) Virgin Records greatest hits collection (Not authorized by the band)

Tribute albums

- If I Were a Carpenter (1994) – "Rainy Days and Mondays"
- Encomium: A Tribute to Led Zeppelin (1995) – "Good Times Bad Times"
- Eyesore: A Stab at the Residents (1996) – "Blue Rosebuds"
- Sweet Relief II: Gravity of the Situation (1996) – "Withering"
- Burning London: The Clash Tribute (1999) – "White Riot"
- This Is Where I Belong - The Songs of Ray Davies & The Kinks (2002) – "Victoria"
