= Ike Reilly =

American musician (born 1963)

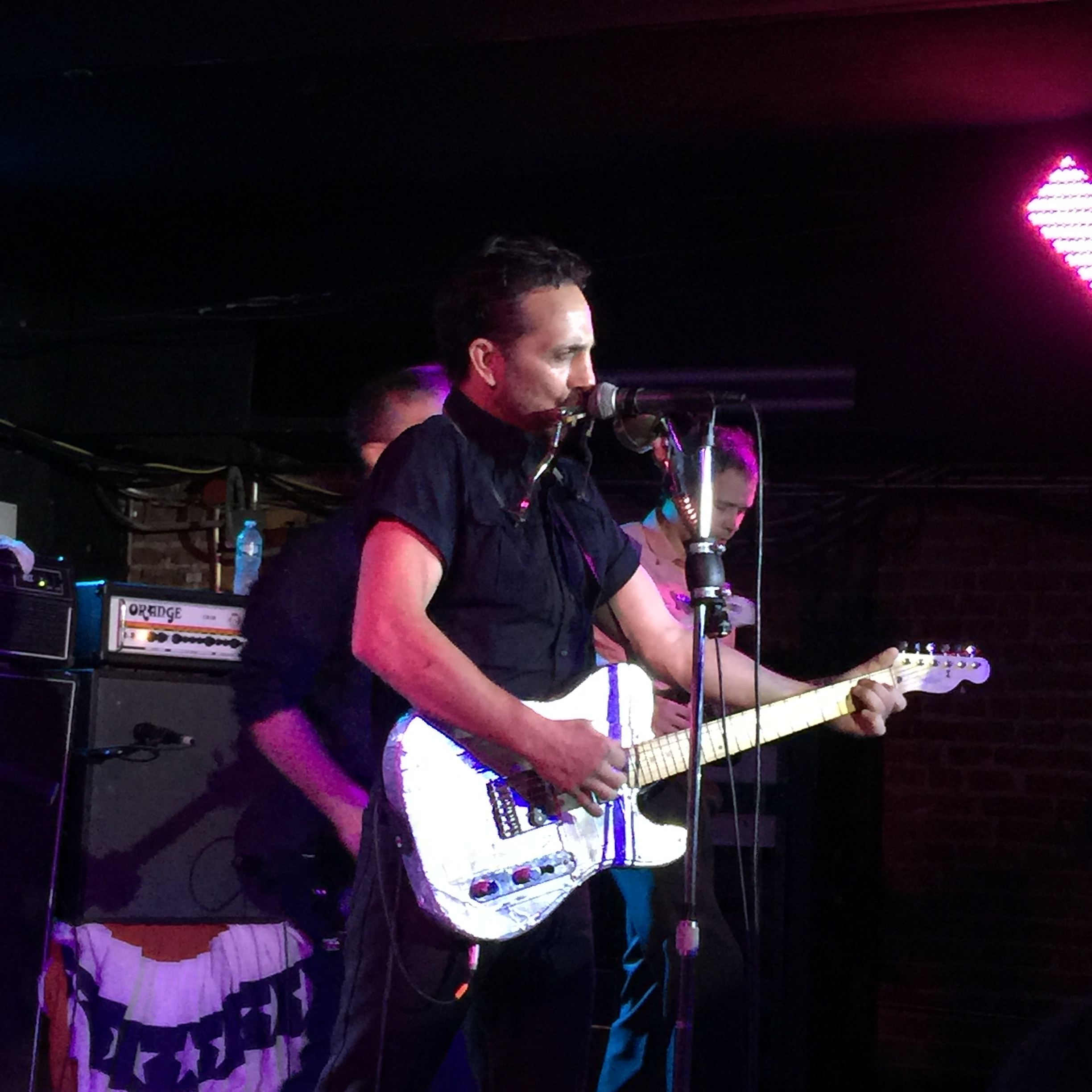
- Reilly (front) performing at the Mercury Lounge in New York City on July 16, 2015

Background information
- Born: Michael Christopher Reilly; December 27, 1963 (age 62); Naval Station Great Lakes
- Origin: Libertyville, Illinois, United States
- Genres: Folk rock, alternative rock, acoustic rock, anti-folk
- Occupations: Musician, songwriter
- Instruments: Guitar, harmonica, vocals
- Years active: 1992–present
- Labels: Rock Ridge Music, Universal Records
- Website: www.ikereilly.com

Michael Christopher "Ike" Reilly (born December 27, 1963) is an American singer-songwriter, musician, and writer as well as frontman and founder of the rock band the Ike Reilly Assassination. He started his music career with various rock bands near his hometown of Libertyville, Illinois, playing guitar for groups such as The Drovers in the late 1980s. After working for a time in music production, in 2001 he released his debut solo album through Universal Records.

Afterwards, Reilly released several albums with The Ike Reilly Assassination, including the well-received Sparkle in the Finish in 2004, through Rock Ridge Music. He released his eighth album of solo material, Crooked Love, in May 2018. According to Mario Mesquita Borges of Allmusic, "Reilly has followed a trail separate from most of today's singer/songwriters -- unlike other such artists, Reilly prefers the harshness of intrepid rocking riffs, sustained by ingenious melodies and exalting words." David Carr of the New York Times said: "Ike Reilly is a kind of natural resource, mined from the bedrock of music. All the values that make rock important to people—storytelling, melody, rage, laughter—are part and parcel of every Ike Reilly show I have ever seen."

== Early life and education ==
Michael Christopher Reilly was born at the United States Naval Hospital, Naval Station Great Lakes in Illinois. He was raised in nearby Libertyville, where he graduated from Libertyville High School, known for notable alumni Marlon Brando and Tom Morello and excelled in cross country running. It was in middle school that he started writing songs and became adept at playing the harmonica, booking his first paying gig at age 13. Reilly learned to play guitar while working at Ascension Catholic Cemetery, a job he held every summer through high school and college. He started by cutting the grass, and then moved on to digging graves. Following high school, Reilly attended Marquette University in Milwaukee, Wisconsin where he majored in Theology and enrolled in the Marine Corps. officer training school.

== Music career ==
=== First groups (1990s) ===
Reilly formed his first band, Captain Budget and the Loan Sharks, while a student at Marquette University. After graduating, he moved to Chicago and formed a band called the Eisenhowers. Reilly dropped the M from his first name and officially became known as Ike. He quit the Eisenhowers to join The Drovers, a Celtic rock band active in Chicago. He subsequently founded the band Community 9, with bandmates such as Mars Williams (Liquid Soul, The Psychedelic Furs, The Waitresses) Phil Karnats (Secret Machines, Tripping Daisy), and Aidan O'Toole (The Muck Brothers). In 1989, though still pursuing music, Reilly took a job at the Park Hyatt Chicago, where he remained until the hotel was torn down. He was the recipient of the “Employee of the Year” award by Hyatt Hotel just before his tenure at the hotel ended. He decided to retire from music in the early 1990s.

=== Salesmen and Racists (1997–2003) ===
Reilly pursued alternate paths after leaving his work at the Hyatt, becoming a freelance production assistant and, in 1997, opened the Diamond City recording studio with engineer Blaise Barton. He continued to write songs and started recording them with engineer Ed Tinley. After taking a musical hiatus, Reilly continued to write songs and started recording in 1998 with engineer Ed Tinley, who had worked with Liz Phair, Smashing Pumpkins, and R. Kelly. “This marked the first time Reilly recorded without a band, depending more on samples and loops, starting with an acoustic take and then "building the song out." Those demo tapes caught the attention of several high-profile music industry veterans such as Mike Simpson of the Dust Brothers. A month later Reilly signed a recording contract with Universal Republic Records, where he released his critically acclaimed debut album Salesmen And Racists in 2001. It featured guest credits from artists such as Mickey Petralia. Reilly parted ways with Universal in 2003, and since been releasing music on Rock Ridge Music.

=== Albums with backing band (2004–2007) ===
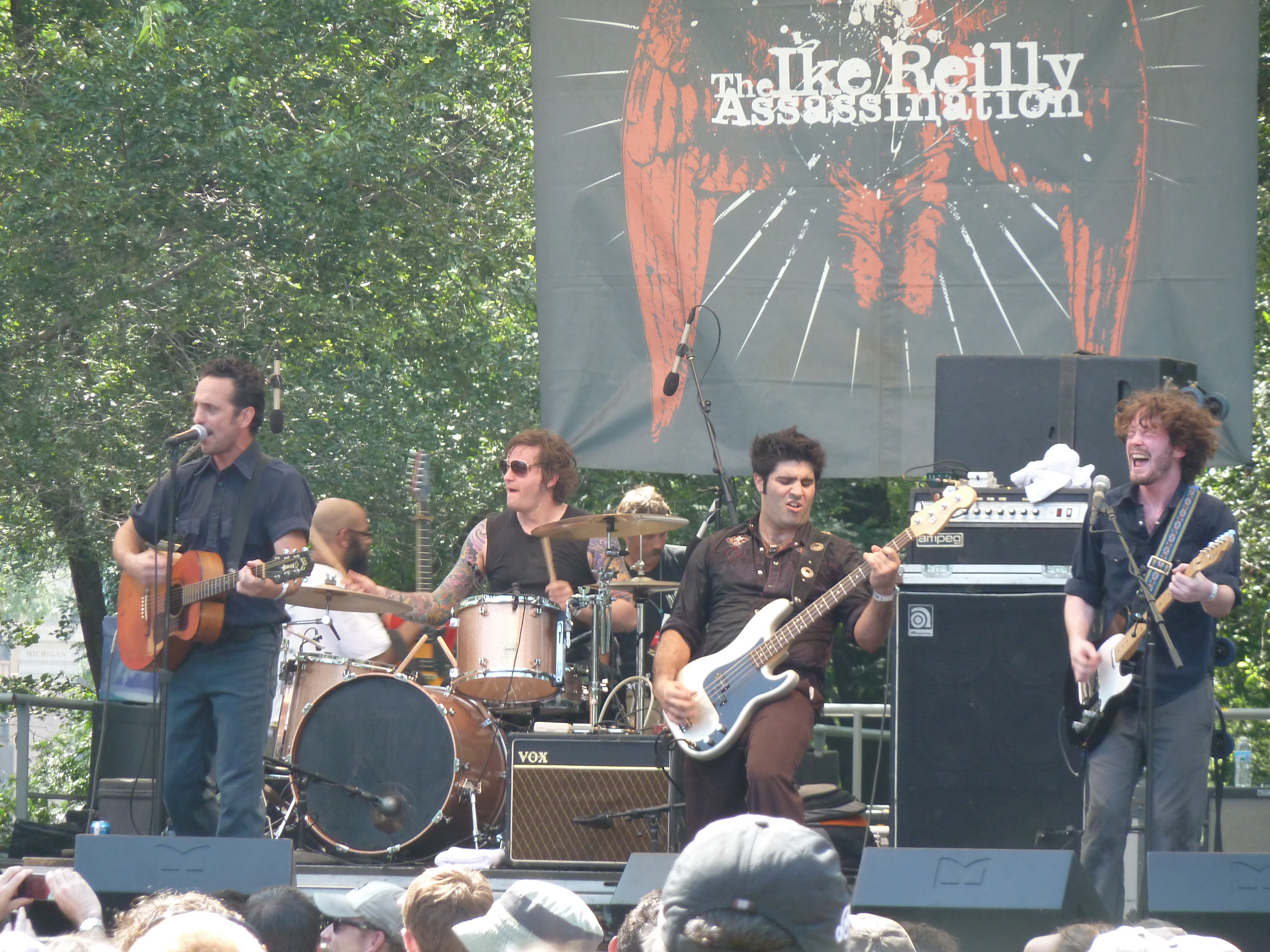
The Ike Reilly Assassination 2010. Reilly is far left.

Reilly soon began recording music with the backing band The Ike Reilly Assassination. The group released their first album as a group, Sparkle in the Finish, in 2004. Allmusic described it as "pure rock & roll swagger" and gave the album a glowing review and a score of 4.5/5, praising the songwriting, performance, and variety of rock sounds. Their next album, Junkie Faithful in 2004, was described as adopting "a dry-humored, Nick Lowe/Chuck Prophet-inspired style of pop/rock." The Ike Reilly Assassination became well known by fans of the Chicago improv duo TJ and Dave, who start each show with the original Ike Reilly song "I Don't Want What You Got (Goin On)" off of Sparkle in the Finish, among other tracks. The band's 2007 album We Belong to the Staggering Evening was described as "soulful, blues-tinged."

=== Hard Luck Stories and Born on Fire (2008–2015) ===
In 2008 Reilly again released an album under his own name, naming the two-disc compilation of "odds and ends" Poison the Hit Parade. This was followed by his album Hard Luck Stories in 2009. After the release of his sixth album, Reilly spent two years working on a pilot for the AMC channel called Where's My Goddamn Medicine?, though the pilot was ultimately not picked up. Afterwards, he began working on new material with the Ike Reilly Assassination.

After a five-year gap, Reilly's seventh studio album Born on Fire was released in June 2015, again through Rock Ridge Music. The release was a joint venture with and the debut release for Tom Morello's new Firebrand Records. John Ellis of No Depression gave it a glowing review, praising the style and describing it as an "ode to a time when rock and roll was rock and roll...Ike Reilly has crafted an album that weaves in and out of the great epochs of rock." Popmatters wrote that "Reilly’s sonic indelibility only remains second fiddle to his astounding ability to craft a personal story and envelop it in song," while American Songwriter gave it 4/5 stars, calling it "pure, unaffected and raw" and praising his "skewed, dry, self-effacing humor."

=== Crooked Love (2018) ===
On May 18, Reilly released "Crooked Love." Reilly told The Current, "I don't have an iron-clad mind, but I remember people, you know. Who they are and what they're about. And then I steal their souls and stories. I act like I like them. And then I suck everything I can out of them."

== Style and influences ==
Stated guitarist Tom Morello in June 2015, "In my view, he's one of the best American songwriters of the last 10 years, both in delivery and lyrics. It's, like, part Springsteen, part Replacements. According to Mario Mesquita Borges of Allmusic, "Reilly has followed a trail separate from most of today's singer/songwriters – unlike other such artists, Reilly prefers the harshness of intrepid rocking riffs, sustained by ingenious melodies and exalting words."

== Personal life ==
Reilly continues to live in his hometown of Libertyville with his family.

== The Ike Reilly Assassination lineup ==
Current members

- Ike Reilly (2000–present) – lead vocals, electric and acoustic guitar
- Dave Cottini (2000–present) – drums, lead background vocals
- Phil Karnats (2000–present) – electric guitar
- Pete Cimbalo – bass, backing vocals
- Adam Krier – piano, backing vocals

Previous and rotating members

- Tommy O’Donnell – Bapo, guitar
- Ed Tinley (2000–present) – guitar, piano

== Discography ==
=== Albums ===
Full-length albums by Ike Reilly
Yr	Title	Label	Release details
2001	Salesmen and Racists	Universal Records	
2004	Sparkle in the Finish (with The Ike Reilly Assassination)	Rock Ridge	
2005	Junkie Faithful (with The Ike Reilly Assassination)	Rock Ridge	
2007	We Belong to the Staggering Evening (with The Ike Reilly Assassination)	Rock Ridge	
2009	Hard Luck Stories	Rock Ridge	
2015	Born on Fire	Rock Ridge/Firebrand	CD, vinyl, digital - I Am Chris Farley Soundtrack
2018	Crooked Love	Rock Ridge	
2021	Because the Angels	Rock Ridge	

=== EPs ===
Year	Title	Label	Release details
2005	The B-Sides (with The Ike Reilly Assassination)	Rock Ridge	B-Sides From Sparkle in the Finish / Digital only
2006	The Last Demonstration (with The Ike Reilly Assassination)	Rock Ridge	Digital only

=== Compilations ===
Year	Title	Label	Release details
2008	Poison The Hit Parade	Rock Ridge	B-Sides/Outtakes

== See also ==
- List of singer-songwriters
