= Euro-Trash Girl =

Single by Cracker

from the album Kerosene Hat
- Released: August 1994
- Genre: Alternative country, alternative rock
- Length: 8:04 (album version); 4:50 (single edit)
- Label: Virgin
- Songwriters: Davey Faragher; David Lowery; Johnny Hickman; Joey Peters
- Producers: Dennis Herring; David Lowery

Cracker singles chronology
"Get Off This" (1994)	"Euro-Trash Girl" (1994)	"I Hate My Generation" (1996)

"Euro-Trash Girl" is a song by American rock band Cracker. It was originally released on the EP Tucson (1992), and later appeared on their second studio album Kerosene Hat (1993) as a hidden track. The song was released as the third and final single from Kerosene Hat in August 1994.

The B-sides "River Euphrates" and "Bad Vibes Everybody" were also both originally featured on Tucson. A cover of Neil Young's "Fucking Up", the last and only live track on the single, has lead vocals sung by Mark Linkous. It was recorded live at the Metro Chicago, courtesy of WXRT (according to the liner notes on the back of the CD).

== Track listing ==
- US CD single
1. "Euro-Trash Girl" – 8:00
2. "River Euphrates" – 2:59
3. "Bad Vibes Everybody" – 2:36
4. "Blue Danube Blues" – 2:08
5. "Fucking Up" – 4:32

== Charts ==
Chart (1995)	Peak position
Australia (ARIA)	162
US Alternative Airplay (Billboard)	25

== Release history ==
Region	Date	Format(s)	Label(s)	Ref.
United States	August 1994	Modern rock radio	Virgin	
United States	September 13, 1994	CD; cassette	Virgin	

== Cover versions ==
German band FSK covered the song on their 1996 album International, produced by Cracker's David Lowery (who also is an occasional member of the group).

The track was also covered by electroclash group Chicks on Speed for the debut 2000 album The Unreleases, and included on several compilations around that time.
