= Frank Funaro =

American drummer

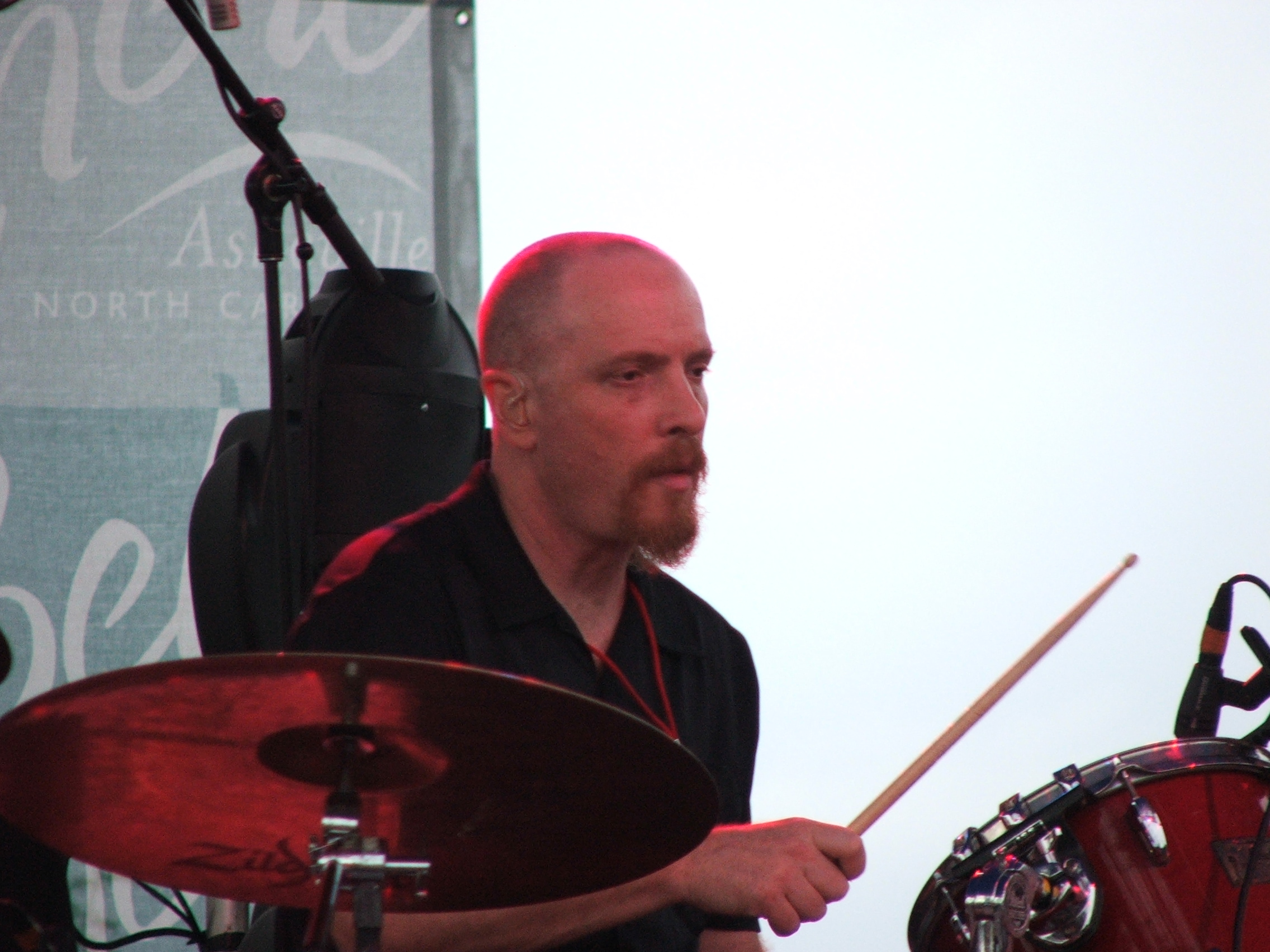
- Funaro performing in July 2006

Background information
- Born: 23 June 1958 (age 68)
- Genres: Alternative rock Post-grunge; Rock
- Occupation: Musician
- Instruments: Drummer, Percussionist, Backing Vocalist
- Labels: Enigma Records/EMI Records; Cooking Vinyl (2003–present)
- Website: iplaythedrums.com

Frank Funaro (born June 23, 1958) is an American drummer who has played with Del Lords, The Brandos, Camper Van Beethoven, Joey Ramone, The Dictators, Cracker, Nils Lofgren & Dion DiMucci.

Funaro collaborated with Joey Ramone on his first solo record Don't Worry About Me on four tracks.

In 1994, Funaro accompanied former Del Lords member Scott Kempner and legendary vocalist Dion DiMucci to form the Little Kings.

Funaro joined the lineup of his current band, Cracker, in 1998. Funaro replaced prior touring drummer Johnny Hott after the release of Cracker's album The Golden Age in 1996.
