= Johnny Hickman =

American musician (born 1959)

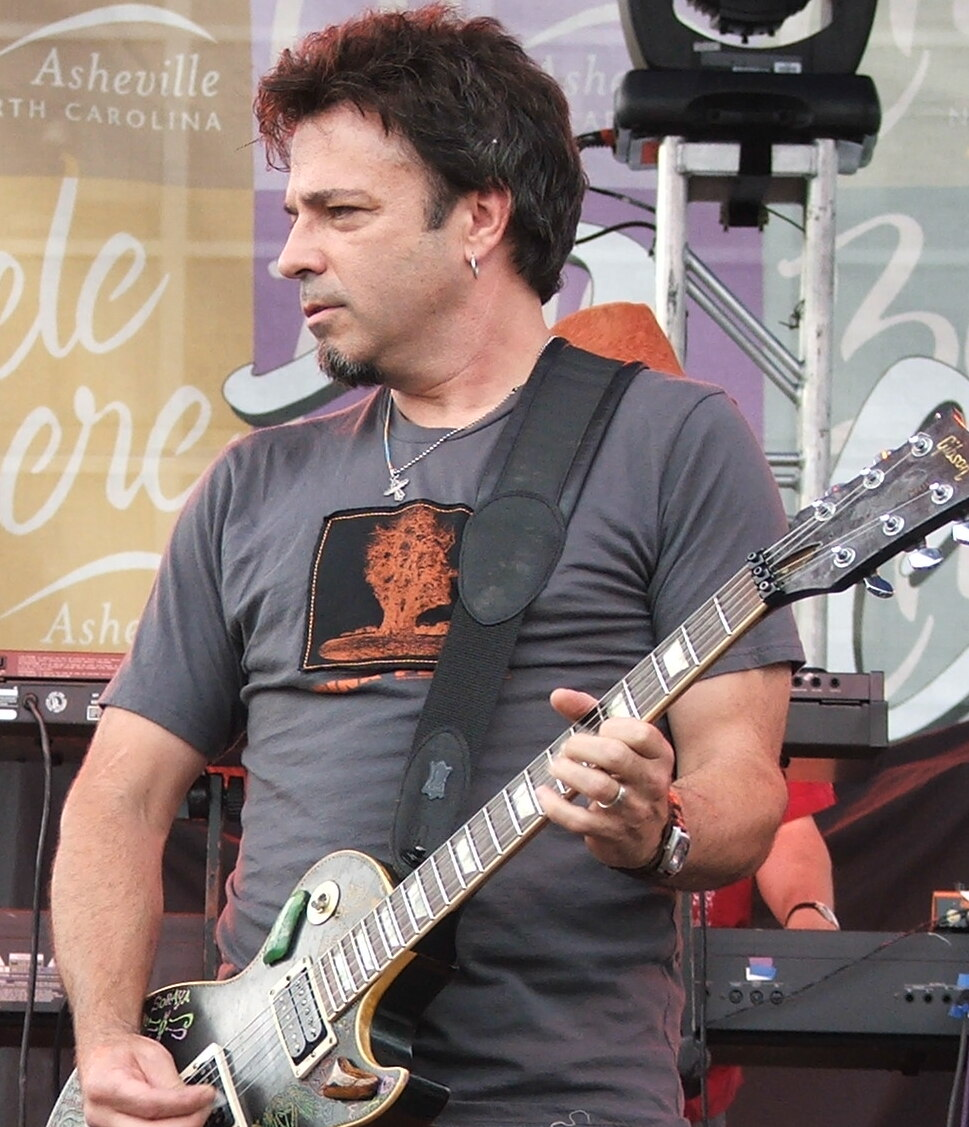
- Hickman performing in July, 2006

Background information
- Born: September 10, 1959 (age 67)
- Origin: Redlands, CA, U.S.
- Genres: Alternative rock; country; country rock; southern rock; roots rock; blues
- Occupations: Musician; Film score composer
- Instruments: Vocals; Guitar
- Years active: 1978 - present
- Label: Campstove Records

John Arthur Hickman (born September 10, 1959) is an American musician best known as the lead guitarist and co-founder of U.S. rock band Cracker.

== Biography ==
=== Early years ===
Hickman is a native of Redlands in San Bernardino County in California's Inland Empire. Prior to his tenure in Cracker, Hickman had stints in various California bands including The Unforgiven and The Dangers.

=== Cracker ===
In the early 1990s, he co-founded Cracker with childhood friend, David Lowery. His often imitated signature sound, influenced by punk rock, surf guitar and "Bakersfield Country" sound, is played on a 1977 Les Paul guitar.

=== Solo/Other Projects ===
In addition to his role with Cracker, Hickman engages in solo work and various side projects such as the Hickman-Dalton Gang (a collaboration with Jim Dalton of Roger Clyne & The Peacemakers and The Railbenders), All Thumbs Trio (with Chuck Garvey and Gibb Droll) and Crazy Sloth, a Colorado-based band. He has one full film score to his credit (River Red (1998)), and several of the songs that he has co-written with David Lowery have been used in films.

In 2005, Hickman released his first solo album, Palmhenge. On July 3, 2012 he released his second solo album, Tilting.

== Solo discography ==
- Palmhenge (2005)
- Tilting (2012)
- Dear John EP (2019)
- The Best of Hickmania Vol 1 (2020)
- Blood Moon (2021)

== Filmography ==
- The Cowboy Way - writer: "Blue Danube Blues" (1994)
- White Man's Burden - writer: "How Can I Live Without You" (1995)
- The Cable Guy - writer: "Get Outta My Head" (1996)
- Origin of the Species - writer: "I Hate My Generation" (1998)
- River Red - composer (1998)
