= El Camino Real =

El Camino Real (Spanish; "The Royal Road" or "The King's Highway") may refer to:

== Roads ==
- El Camino Real (California), a commemorative route in the U.S. state of California from San Diego to Sonoma
  - California State Route 82, a highway named El Camino Real that follows portions of the historic route
- El Camino Real (Florida), a historic trail from St. Augustine westward to the Spanish missions in north Florida
- El Camino Real (Missouri), a historic trail connecting Spanish settlements in cities like New Madrid and Ste. Genevieve
- El Camino Real (Mexico), a road through Yucatán and Campeche; see Ixtlán del Río § The 20th century and contemporary times
- El Camino Real (Panama), connecting Panama City and Portobelo; see History of Panama (to 1821)
- El Camino Real (Sinaloa and Sonora), a historical road that connected Spanish and later Mexican settlements in Sinaloa and Sonora; see Casanate, Álamos Municipality, Sonora
- El Camino Real (Texas), a road in the Houston/Clear Lake area that parallels residential homes and churches
- El Camino Real de Chiapas, connecting the colonial cities of Chiapa de Corzo, México with Antigua Guatemala; see San Andrés Sajcabajá
- El Camino Real de los Tejas, a Spanish mission trail running through Texas and into Louisiana
- El Camino Real de Tierra Adentro, a historical road that went from Mexico City to Santa Fe, New Mexico

== Music ==
- "El Camino Real" (composition), a 1985 work for concert band by Alfred Reed
- El Camino Real (Todos Tus Muertos album), 1998
- El Camino Real, a 2007 album by William Basinski
- El Camino Real, a 1997 album by Carmaig de Forest
- El Camino Real (Camper Van Beethoven album), 2014
- El Camino Real, a 2020 EP by Jonathan Wilson

== Other uses ==
- Camino Real (play), 1953, by Tennessee Williams
- Camino Real Hotels, a hotel chain in Mexico
- Camino Real strawberry, a strawberry cultivar
- El Camino Real Charter High School, Los Angeles, California, United States
- Episcopal Diocese of El Camino Real, encompassing northern and central California

== See also ==
- El Camino (disambiguation)
- King's Highway (disambiguation)
- Royal Road (disambiguation)
- Via Regia, historical road
