= Kingsrow =

Kingsrow may refer to:

- The row furthest from the player in draughts (checkers)
- KingsRow, a checkers engine
- Kings Row, a 1942 film
- King's Row (Overwatch), a map in the video game Overwatch
- Kings Row (TV series), an American television period drama

== See also ==
- Kingsway (disambiguation)
- King's Road (disambiguation)
