= King's Road (disambiguation) =

King's Road is a street in Chelsea, London, England.

King's Road or Kings Road may also refer to:

- King's Road, Hong Kong
- King's Road (Finland)
- King's Road (Florida), part of Florida State Road 4 (pre-1945)
- King's Road style (also known as "Royal Road"), a style of Japanese professional wrestling popularized by All Japan Pro Wrestling
- Kings Road (Fiji)
- "Kings Road," a song by Tom Petty and the Heartbreakers from Hard Promises

== See also ==
- King's Highway (disambiguation)
- Kingsway (disambiguation)
- Royal Road (disambiguation)
- Shahdara (disambiguation), equivalent term in Persian
- Daang Hari
- Via Regia
