= Royal Road (disambiguation) =

The Royal Road was an ancient Persian highway.

Royal Road may also refer to:

- Royal Road, Kraków, Poland
- The Royal Road, a 2015 documentary film
- Royal road progression, a common chord progression in contemporary Japanese pop music
- Royal Road, a web fiction platform

== See also ==
- King's Highway (disambiguation)
- Kingsway (disambiguation)
- El Camino Real (disambiguation) (Spanish)
- Estrada Real (Portuguese)
- Rue Royale (French)
- Via Regia (Latin)
- Rajpath (Hindi)
- Shahdara (disambiguation) (Persian)
- Royal Road to Card Magic, a 1948 book by Jean Hugard and Frederick Braue
- Great Royal Road or Grand Trunk Road, a road originally built by the Mauryan Empire of ancient India
- Royal Roads, a roadstead in Canada
- Royal Route, Warsaw
