= Kingsway Tunnel (disambiguation) =

Kingsway Tunnel(s) may refer to:

== United Kingdom ==
- Kingsway Tunnel, a road tunnel carrying the A59 road across the River Mersey between Liverpool and Wallasey in Merseyside
- Kingsway tramway subway, a disused tunnel which carried a tramway between Southampton Row and Waterloo Bridge in Central London from 1906 until 1952.
- Kingsway telephone exchange, a disused telephone exchange consisting of two tunnels under High Holborn in London.

== Gibraltar ==
- Kingsway, the main road to the Spanish border including a tunnel under the airport's runway.

== See also ==
- Kingsway (disambiguation)
