= Kingsway =

Kingsway or King's Way may refer to:

== Places ==
=== Australia ===
- Kingsway, Glen Waverley, a shopping strip in Melbourne, Victoria

=== Canada ===
- Kingsway (Edmonton), a road in Edmonton, Alberta (aka Kingsway Avenue)
- Kingsway (Vancouver), a road in Vancouver, British Columbia
- The Kingsway, Toronto, a neighbourhood in Toronto, Ontario (aka Kingsway South)
- The Kingsway, a segment of Sudbury Municipal Road 55, Sudbury, Ontario
- Kingsway College, a Seventh-day Adventist boarding secondary school in Oshawa, Ontario
- Kingsway Mall, a shopping centre in Edmonton, Alberta
- Kingsway Village (Oshawa), a neighbourhood in Oshawa, Ontario
- Burnaby—Kingsway, a federal electoral district in British Columbia between 1988 and 1997
- Lambton-Kingsway Junior Middle School, a public elementary school in Etobicoke, Ontario
- Vancouver Kingsway, a federal electoral district in British Columbia
- Vancouver-Kingsway, a provincial electoral district in British Columbia

=== Gibraltar ===
- Kingsway, Gibraltar, the main access road from Spain to Gibraltar, opened 31 March 2023

=== India ===
- King's Way, New Delhi or Rajpath (Hindi), a road in New Delhi; now officially known as Kartavya Path
- Kingsway Camp, North Delhi

=== New Zealand ===
- KingsWay School, an integrated, co-ed Christian School in Red Beach, Auckland

=== United Kingdom ===
- Kingsway (A34), a major thoroughfare from the south into Manchester and Manchester city centre, England
- King's Way, a long-distance footpath in Hampshire, England
- Kingsway, London, a road in London, England
- Kingsway, Wellingborough, Northamptonshire
- Kingsway, Southport, a former nightclub and casino
- Kingsway, Swansea (disambiguation), multiple uses
- Kingsway Village, a village on the outskirts of Gloucester, England
- Kingsway Hall, a recording venue in Holborn, England
- Kingsway International Christian Centre, a church in Hackney Central, England
- Kingsway Business Park Metrolink station, a Metrolink station in Milnrow, England
- Kingsway Primary School, Trafford, England
- Kingsway Shopping Centre, a shopping centre in Newport, Wales
- Kingsway telephone exchange, underground shelter in London, England, (aka Kingsway Tunnels)
- Kingsway tramway subway, a tunnel in London, England
- Kingsway, part of the A725 road within East Kilbride, Scotland
- Kingsway Court, a tower block housing complex in Scotstoun, Glasgow, Scotland
- Kingsway Tunnel, a road tunnel in Merseyside, England
- The Kingsway, Swansea, a nightlife zone in Swansea, Wales
- The Kingsway School, a secondary school in Stockport, England
- Novelty Theatre (formerly Kingsway Theatre), a theatre in London, England
- Westminster Kingsway College is a college merger of Westminster College and Kingsway College, in London, England

=== United States ===
- Kingsway, Ohio
- Kingsway Christian School, a private school in Orrville, Ohio
- Kingsway East, St. Louis, a neighborhood of St. Louis, Missouri
- Kingsway Elementary School, an elementary school in Port Charlotte, Florida
- Kingsway Regional High School, a public secondary school in Woolwich, New Jersey
- Kingsway Regional Middle School, a public middle school in Woolwich, New Jersey
- Kingsway Regional School District, a school district in New Jersey
- Kingsway West, St. Louis, a neighborhood of St. Louis, Missouri

== Other uses ==
- Dodge Kingsway, an automobile built by Chrysler 1935–1959
- Kingsway (cigarette), a British cigarette brand
- Kingsway (film), a 2018 Canadian film
- Kingsway (horse) (foaled 1940), a British Thoroughbred racehorse
- Kingsway (video game), a 2017 role-playing video game
- Kingsway, a Christian publisher now a subsidiary of David C. Cook
- "The King's Way" (song), a 1909 song written by Edward Elgar
- The King's Way (novel), a 1981 novel by Françoise Chandernagor

== See also ==
- Queensway (disambiguation)
- Chemin du Roy, French for the King's Way or King's Road, a historic trail in Quebec, Canada
- King's Road (disambiguation)
- Shahdara (disambiguation), King's Way in Persian
- Kingsway Underpass (disambiguation)
- One King's Way, a 1995 novel by Harry Harrison and John Holm
