= Via Regia Lusatiae Superioris =

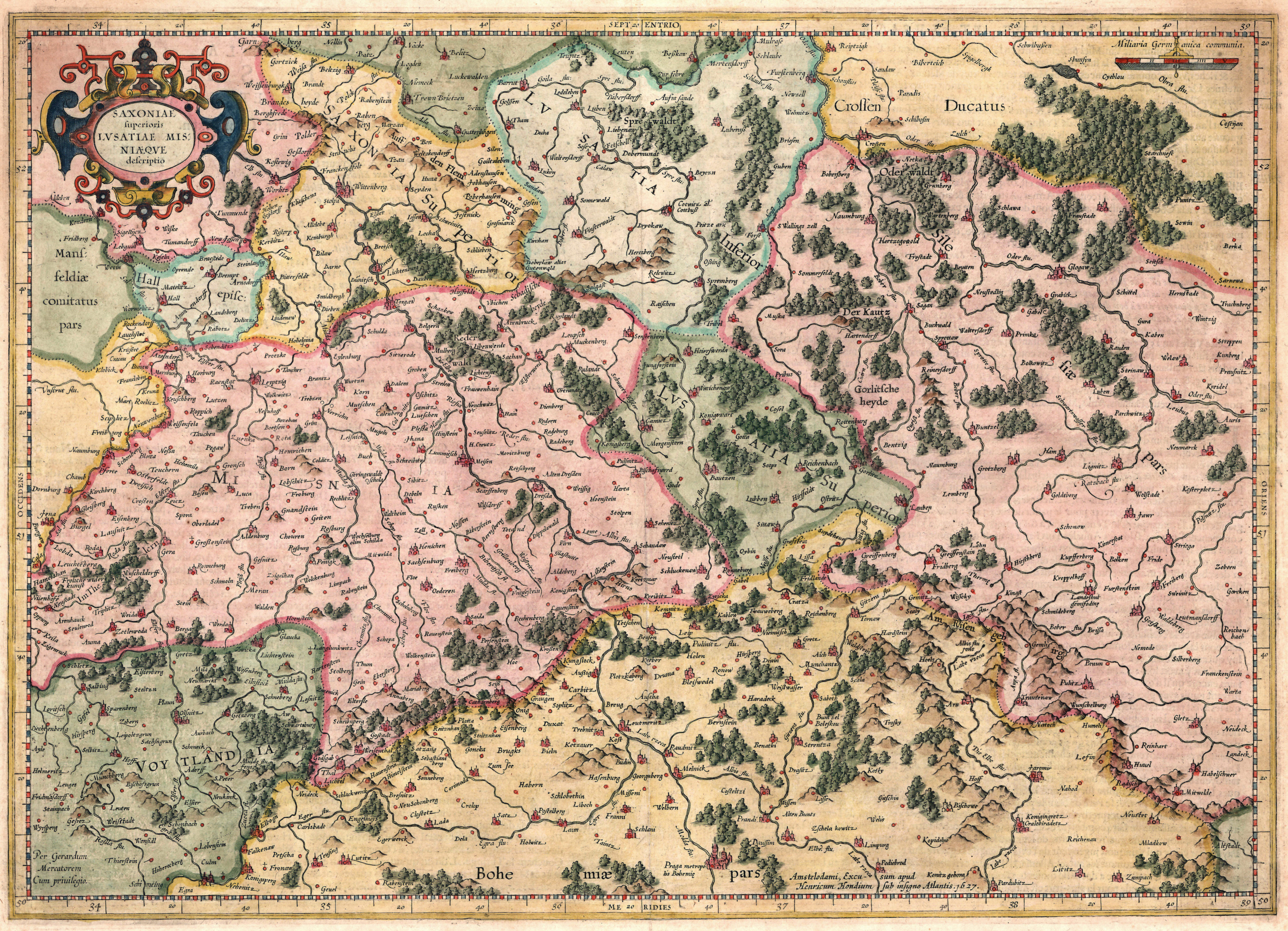
Silesia, Lausitz and Saxony in the 17th century, map from Gerhard Mercator and Henricus Hondius

The High Land Road (also Army Road or Salt Road) lat. via regia Lusatiae superioris, or strata regia, was a trade route and was one of the Ancient roads. It was a part of the Via Regia, which continued west as far as the Rhine.

Over several centuries the road was, along with the Low Road to the north, one of the most important transport links from Middle Germany to Silesia and east Poland. Like other Reichsstraße it was under protection e.g. of local regents. The Via Regia was also significant as a route to Santiago de Compostela from the east.

== Route ==
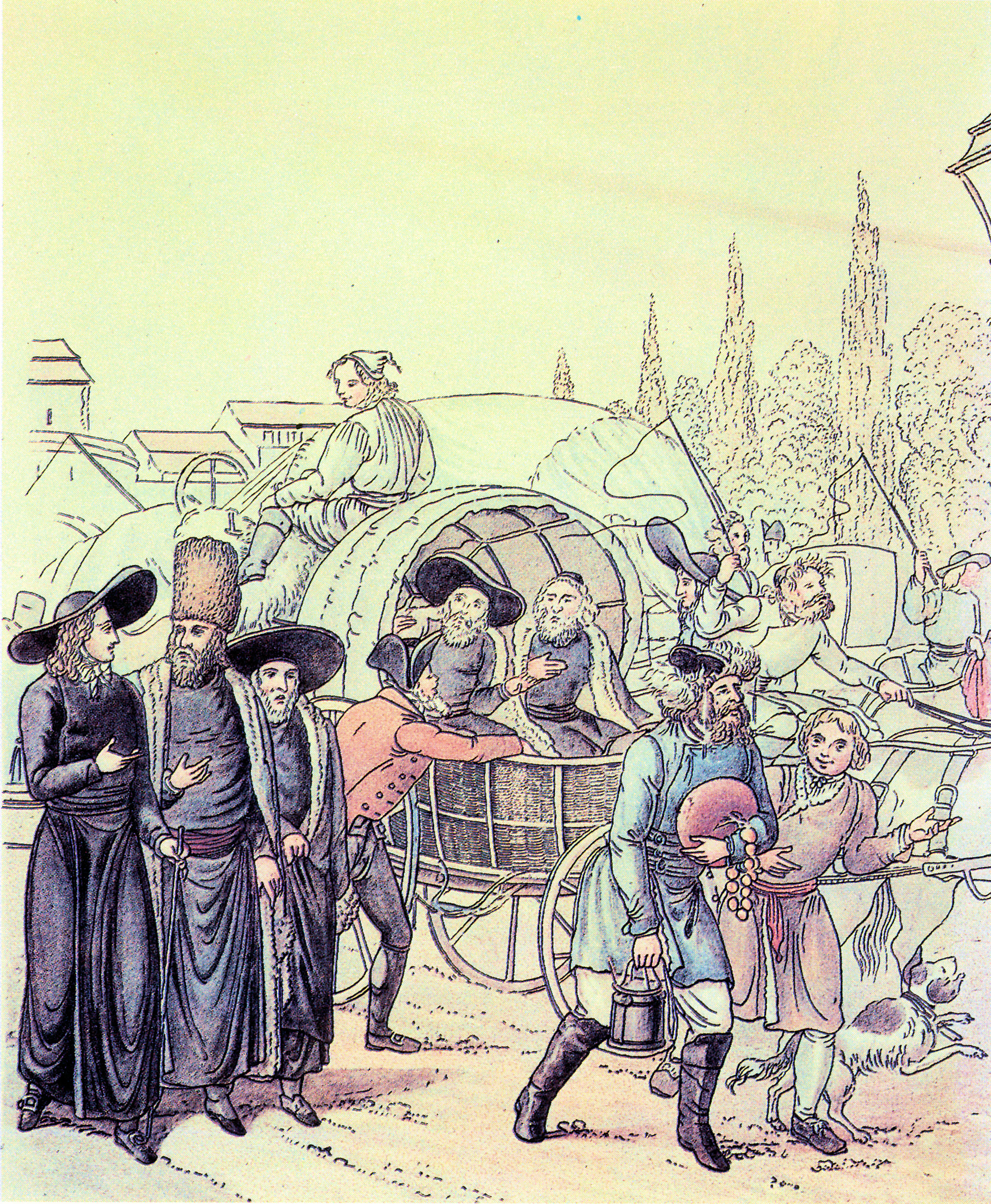
Polish traders at Brühl in Leipzig, a "white elephant" wagon in the background)

The road went through Oberlausitz, from Halle/Saale via Eilenburg or Leipzig-Grimma to Oschatz, Großenhain, Königsbrück, Kamenz, Bautzen, Löbau, Görlitz or Zittau, Lauban, Naumburg, Bunzlau, Haynau, Liegnitz, Neumarkt to Breslau. It had continuations east to Kraków and west from Leipzig or Halle through Thuringia to Frankfurt.
