= Sågbro bridge =

Bridge in Espoo, Finland

Coordinates: 60°11.906′N 24°34.898′E

Sågbro bridge (Espoo manor bridge II) is a stone bridge in Espoo, Espoonkartano district.

== History ==
It is thought to have been completed between 1778 and 1816.

The bridge was built to replace a previously existing wooden bridge on the King's Road which existed already in the 14th century and has been moved to its current location by 1556, when the King's Manor of Espoo was founded.

The Sågbro bridge was taken under museum protection in 1982. The environment of Espoo Manor is included by the Finnish Heritage Agency in the list of Nationally Significant Cultural Environments (RKY).

The Sågbro bridge is not to be mixed with the adjacent Espoo Manor Qvarnbro bridge. The Mankinjoki River divides into two streams at the Kartanonkoski rapids here at Espoo Manor. The Sågbro bridge is over the western stream. Several sawmills have been built on it, the most recent of which remained until the early 20th century.

== Architecture ==
The bridge is a typical 1770s stone vault bridge, and it is considered to be one the oldest of Finnish stone bridges. It was built in the dry stone technique, meaning that the stones were fitted in place without the use of the mortar. The length of the bridge is 17.2 meters, its total width 6.9 meters, with a useful width of 5.6 meters. The vault opening is 2.7 meters wide, and the bridge's "underpass height" is 1.3 meters.

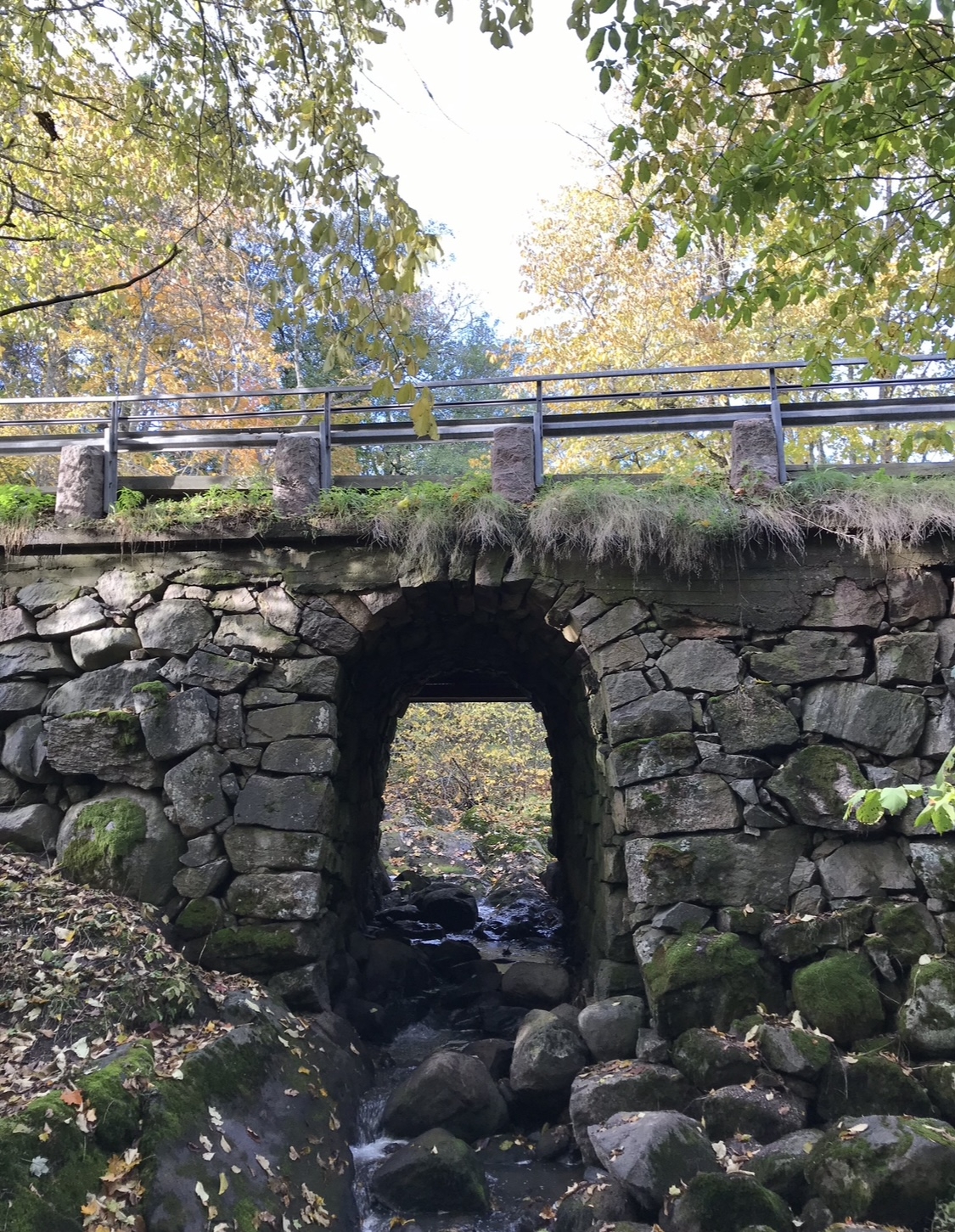
Sågbro bridge

== Literature ==
- Liimatainen, Kirsi: Museum Roads and Bridges of the Road Administration. Museum site survey. Tampere: Road Administration, 2007. ISSN 1459-1561. Online version (accessed 18 July 2024).
- Piltz, Martti & Soosalu, Laura: Espoonkartano bridges S-gbro and Qvarnbro, Espoo, Care and Maintenance Plan. Pirkanmaa Centre for Economic Development, Transport and the Environment, 2012. ISBN 978-952-257-604-0. Online version (accessed 18 July 2024).
