= Qvarnbro bridge =

Bridge in Espoo, Finland

- Coordinates: 60°11′55″N 24°34′56″E
- Locale: Espoo, Finland

Characteristics
- Total length: 10.4 m (34 ft)
- Width: 6.4 m (21 ft)
- Clearance below: 0.4 m (1 ft 4 in)

Qvarnbro (Espoo manor bridge I) is a stone bridge in Espoo, Finland. Qvarnbro is 10.4 metres (34 ft) long, while the stone vault width is 3.3 meters (11 ft). The bridge has a useful width of 6.5 meters (21 ft). The underpass height is 0.4 metres (1 ft 4 in). The bridge is located on the old King's Road from Vyborg to Turku.

== History ==
Qvarnbro bridge was completed no later than January 1778. Qvarnbro is the oldest extant bridge in Finland. It was built using the dry stone technique, meaning that the stones were fitted in place without the use of mortar.

The stone bridge was part of a construction project started by Anders Henrik Ramsay in 1775, which also included a mill built near the manor. The construction was supervised by an expert from Stockholm.

The vicinity of the Espoo Manor is included by the Finnish Heritage Agency in the list of Nationally Significant Cultural Environments (RKY).

== Geography ==
Nearby Sågbro bridge is situated in about 60 meters (200 ft) from the Qvarnbro bridge.

At the Espoo Manor, the rapids in Mankinjoki river are called Kartanonkoski and the river divides into two streams. Qvarnbro runs above the eastern stream and downstream of the bridge is a mill. The view of the bridge vault is blocked by concrete structures on the upstream side and the downstream view is blocked by a mill.

== Literature ==
- Liimatainen, Kirsi (2007). "Tiehallinnon museotiet ja -sillat". Museokohdeselvitys. Tampere: Tiehallinto. ISSN 1459-1561. Archived from the original on 14 October 2023.
- Piltz, Martti; Soosalu, Laura (2012). Espoonkartanon sillat Sågbro ja Qvarnbro. ISBN 978-952-257-604-0. Archived from the original on 20 January 2025.
