= Mankby =

Medieval village in Finland

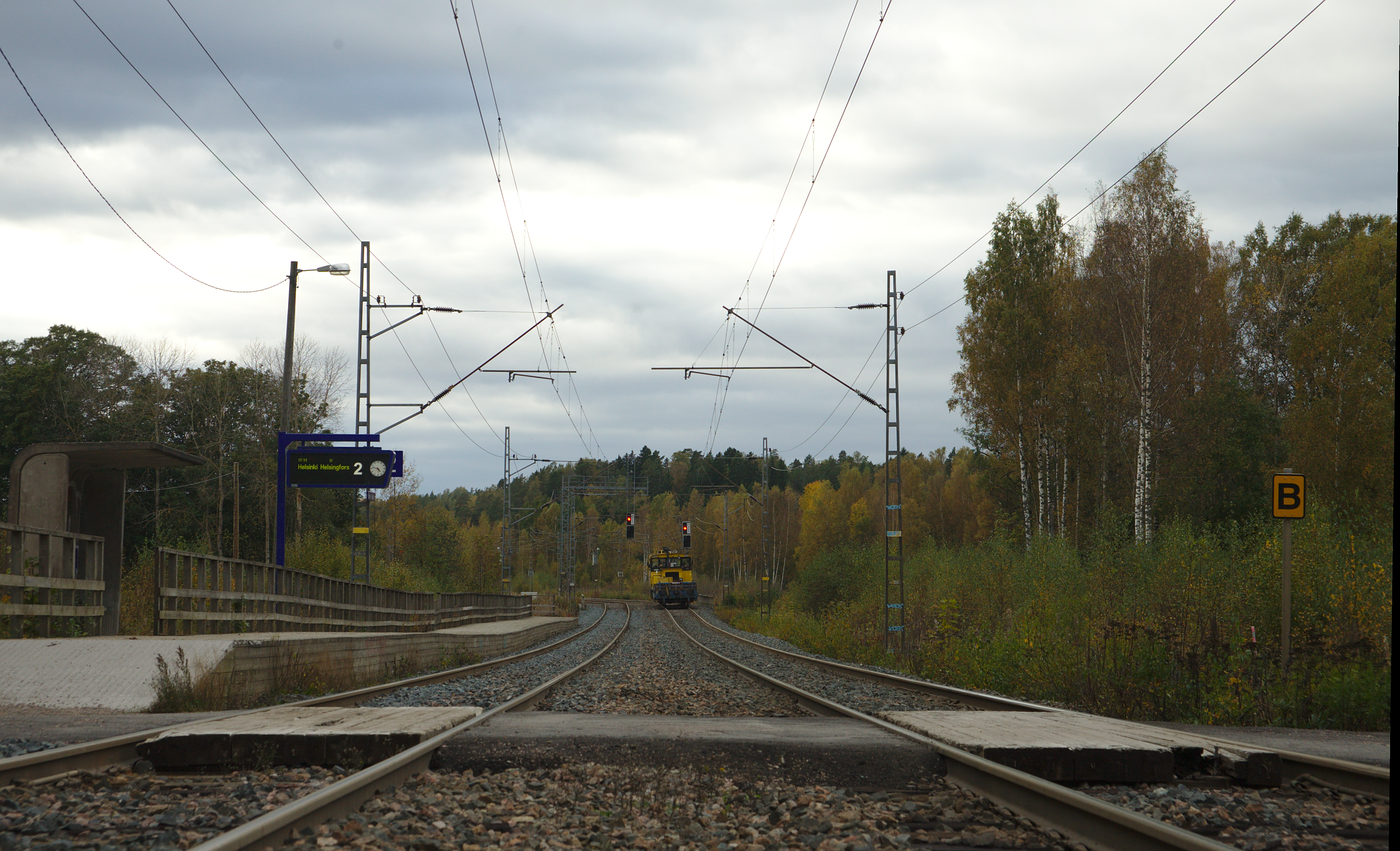
Mankki (Mankby) railway station

Mankby was a Medieval village in Finland under the Swedish rule. It's nowadays located in the Espoonkartano district of the city of Espoo, and extensive archaeological excavations have occurred there in recent years.

The early stages of the village are not known, but it was formed along the King's Road. At the beginning of the 16th century, the village consisted of eight estates. The houses in Mankby were mostly around 25 square meters, although one house is considerably larger and based on the excavation finds, it was possibly associated with the House of Bjälbo.

In 1556, King Gustav I decided to found a royal mansion in Espoo and the populations of Mankby and Espoby were transferred elsewhere. Following the decision, Mankby was completely abandoned and mostly forgotten.

In 2004, some foundations of the dismantled cottages were found, prompting archaeological excavations that lasted 2007–2013. Publication of the research, called Mankby. A Deserted Medieval Village on the Coast of Southern Finland, was published in 2016. There are plans of turning Mankby into an archaeological park.
