= Espoo Manor =

Manor house in Espoo, Finland

Royal Espoo manor (Finnish: Espoon kartano, Swedish Swedish: Esbo gård) is a manor in the Espoonkartano district of Espoo, after which the district itself is named. It is historically the most significant of Espoo's manors. Espoo Manor's extensive landscape complex includes several culturally historically significant buildings.

== History ==
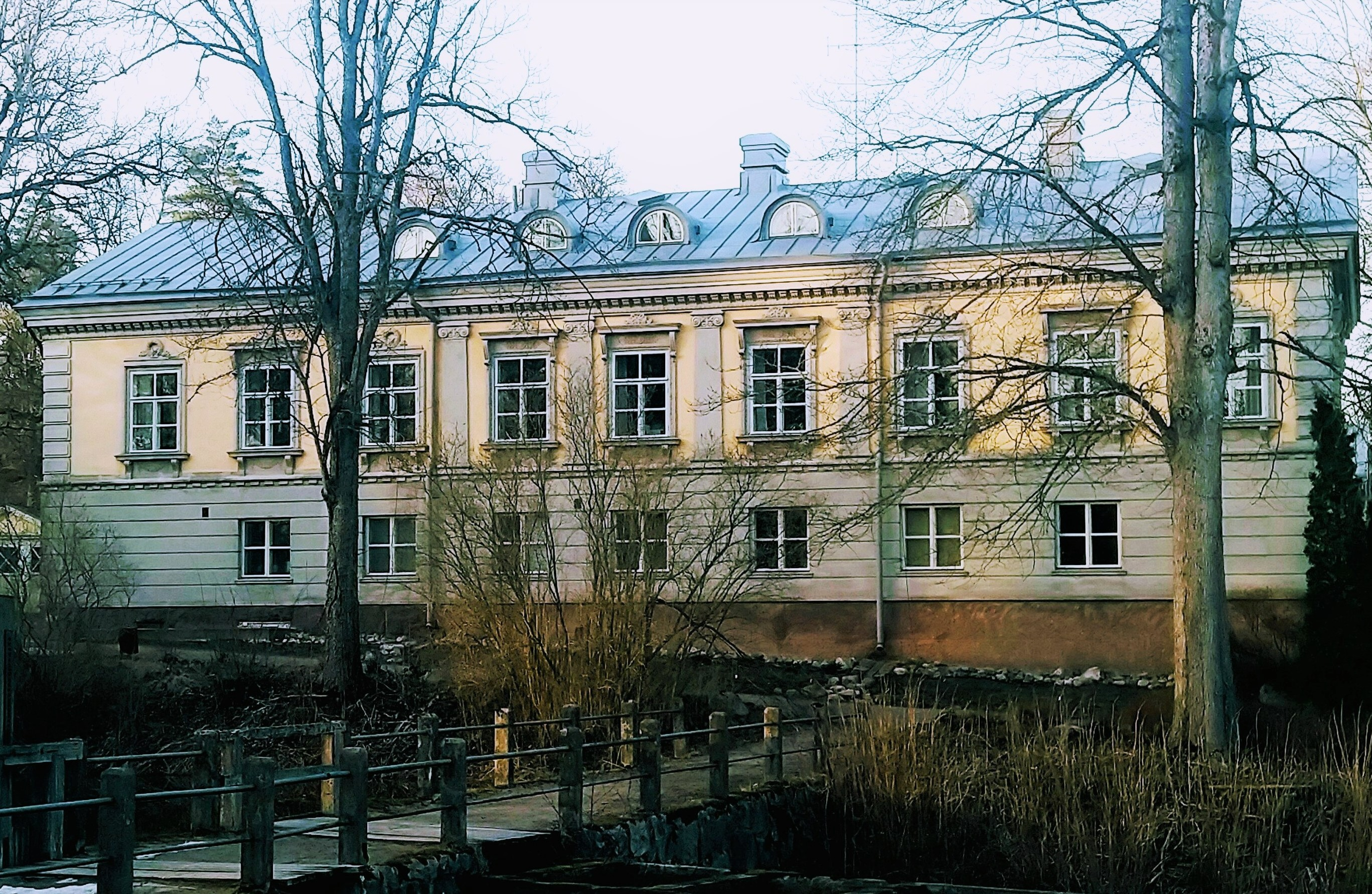
The main building of the Espoo manor

King Gustav Vasa decided to set up a manor in that place because of the tense situation on the eastern border of the kingdom, where an open conflict began in 1555. The Royal Manor (Kongsgård) was set up on the grounds of the villages of Espåby and Mankby, and the peasants received replacement fields elsewhere. The agreement with was signed at the Espoo parish on 27 August 1556. The estate was formed by combining nearby villages with an initial holding of 30 hectares of arable land and 1,200 hectares of forest.

The first bailiff (Swedish fogde, Finnish vouti) of the estate in 1557–1558 was Peder Mandel. The next one after him, Truis Perinpoika, was its bailiff in 1559–1563. Since 1564, after administrative changes resulting in attachment of Espoo from Raasepori County to Porvoo County, the manor had no bailiff of its own. After a new administrative change, Rasmus Jönsinpoika was bailiff in 1572–1575. After this, Espoo Manor was under the Raasepori County bailiff until the end of the century.

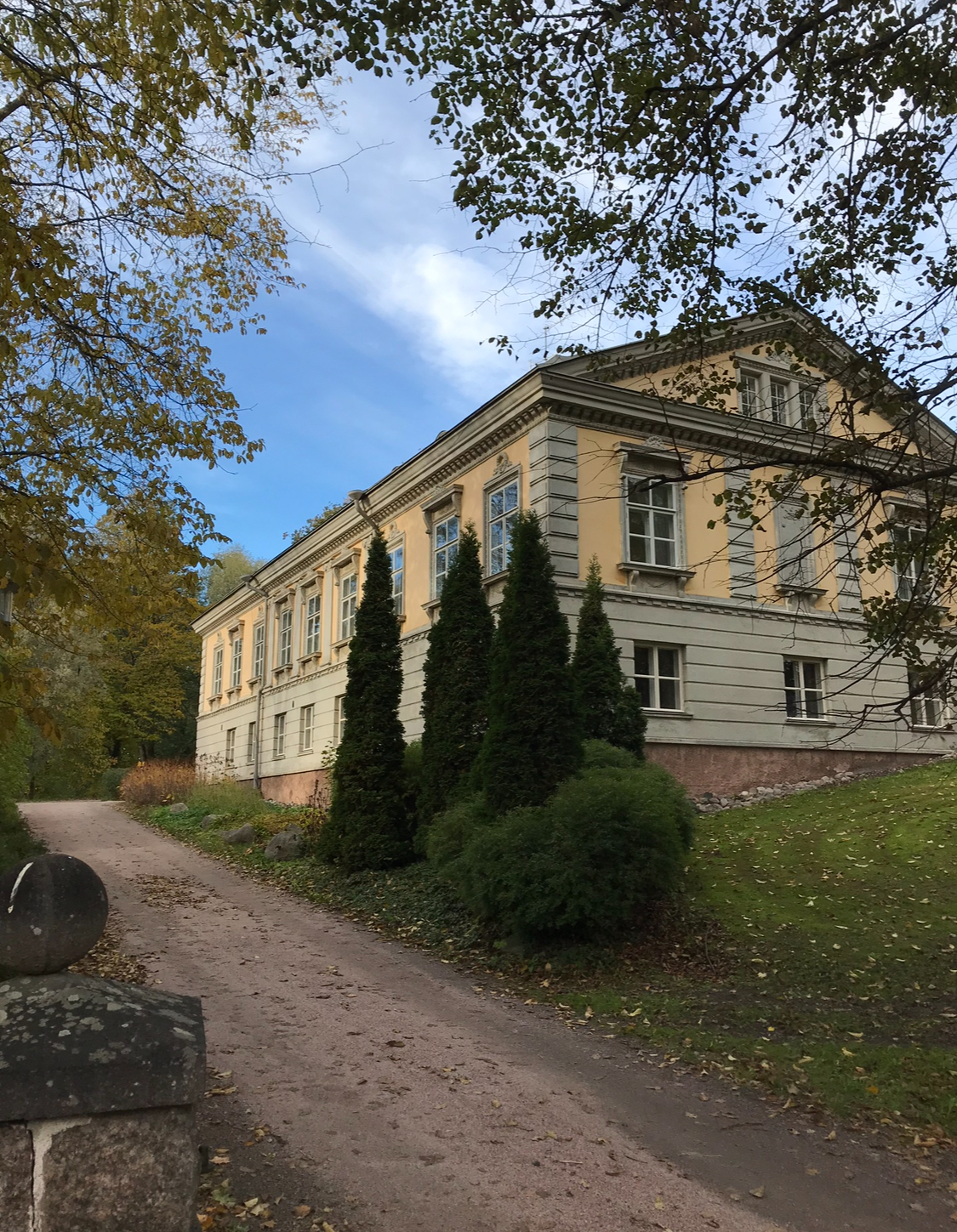
The Espoo estate

In 1756, Anders Henrik Ramsay bought the estate. There he erected two stone bridges, the Qvarnbro and the Sågbro. These are the oldest stone bridges in Finland still in use. The estate was inherited by Anders Henrik's daughter Sofia Lovisa Ramsay in 1787. In the end of 18th century, it was decided to build a stone two-storey main building, and on either side of a wing building. The wing buildings were completed in 1797 and 1801, but the main building was never built.

In the early 19th century, Espoonkartano was in financial trouble. In 1914 it was bought back by August Ramsay with the objective to restore the manor house. The restoration project was implemented under Wäinö Palmqvist, and at that time the manor house took its present appearance. The building was extended, a column porch was built and the house was plastered and decorated. At the same time, additional buildings were also built, including a large barn and workers' dwellings.

The former barn of the manor has been converted into a stable, and the Espoo Riding stable operated in its premises between 1987 and 2016.

=== Coordinates ===
60°11′56″N 24°34′57″E

== See also ==
- King's Road
