= King's Highway =

King's Highway or Kings Highway may refer to:

== Roads ==
=== Australia ===
- Kings Highway (Australia), connecting Queanbeyan to Batemans Bay

=== Canada ===
- King's Highways, an alternative designation for the primary provincial highway system in Ontario
- King's Highway (French: Chemin du Roy), part of Route 138 in Quebec

=== United States ===
- Kings Highway (Brooklyn), a broad avenue passing through mostly commercial areas in the southern part of Brooklyn
- King's Highway (Charleston to Boston), United States
  - U.S. Route 17 Business (Myrtle Beach, South Carolina)
- (Old) King's Highway (Massachusetts Route 6A), Cape Cod, MA
  - Old King's Highway Historic District, Barnstable, MA
  - Brewster Old King's Highway Historic District, Brewster, MA
- (Old) Kings Highway (History of Darien, Connecticut), Darien, CT
- Kings Highway (Virginia State Route 3), central Virginia
- Kings Highway (Virginia State Route 125), Suffolk, Virginia
- Kings Highway (New Jersey Route 27), northern New Jersey
- Kings Highway (today County Route 13 (Rockland County, New York)), a major route through Valley Cottage, New York
- Kings Highway (today Farm to Market Road 989), in Bowie County, Texas
- Kings Highway (today Pennsylvania Route 143), in eastern Pennsylvania
- Kings Highway (today U.S. Route 61), the trail following the Mississippi River northward from New Orleans, Louisiana, through New Madrid, Sikeston, Cape Girardeau, Perryville, and St. Louis, Missouri

=== Historical roads ===
- King's Highway (ancient), an ancient trade route from Egypt to Syria mentioned in the Bible
- El Camino Real (California) (lit. "the King's Road"), a commemorative route

== Places ==
- Kings Highway Conservation District, Dallas, Texas, a neighborhood

== Railway stations ==
- New York City Subway stations:
  - Kings Highway (BMT Brighton Line) at East 16th Street; serving the B and Q trains
  - Kings Highway (IND Culver Line) at McDonald Avenue; serving the F and <F> trains
  - Kings Highway (BMT Sea Beach Line) at West 8th Street; serving the N and W trains
- Church Street station (MBTA), known as Kings Highway during planning

== Films and songs ==
- The King's Highway, a 1927 British film
- "Kings Highway," a song on Tom Petty and the Heartbreakers' album Into the Great Wide Open
- "King's Highway," a song by Kenny Wayne Shepherd album Trouble Is...

== See also ==
- King's Road (disambiguation)
- Royal Road (disambiguation)
- El Camino Real (disambiguation)
- Kingsway (disambiguation)
