= Imperial road =

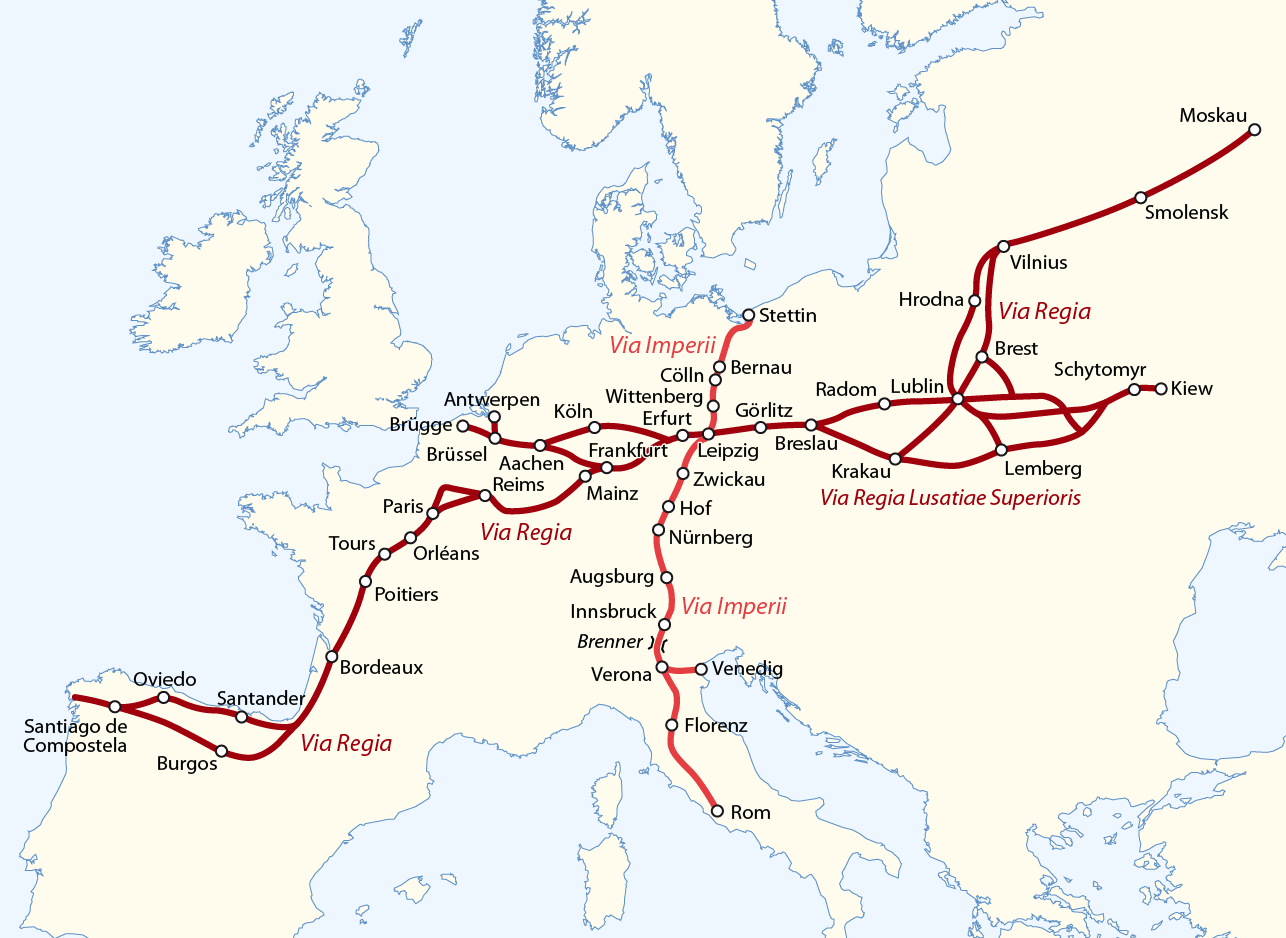
Via Imperii and Via Regia

In medieval times, imperial roads (German: Reichsstraßen) were designated routes in the Holy Roman Empire that afforded protection to travellers in return for tolls collected for the emperor.

The Reichsstraßen came under royal jurisdiction (Königsbann) and travellers were afforded the protection of the Landfrieden, a law that was supposed to ensure peace and unhindered passage similar to the Queen's peace. From the 10th century it was also extended to bridges and ferries. Under King Henry I of Germany the term Reichsstrasse (des riches strâze in Middle High German) was used for the first time as a translation of strata imperialis.

According to Charlemagne's legislation, based on Gallic public law, the maintenance of roads, the responsibility for transport infrastructure and security were part of the duties and privileges of the king, his "regalia". In return the king received the taxes. He invested the territorial rulers through whose lordships the roads ran, with the execution of these duties. A safe-conduct letter (tote Geleit) or an armed escort (lebende Geleit), ensured the safety of the travellers. The escort was provided on specified occasions, of which travelling to the election and coronation of Roman-German kings and emperors was the most important, whereas travelling to trade fairs and markets were the most common.

Important imperial roads were the north-south Via Imperii and the east-west Via Regia meeting at Leipzig, as well as the Via Carolina from the Imperial city of Nuremberg to Prague established by Emperor Charles IV, the Hellweg, the Burgundy Way and Italian Way/Via Francigena.
