= Queensway =

Queensway may refer to:

== Roads ==
=== Canada ===
- Queensway (Ottawa), which consists of Ontario Highway 417 and Ottawa Road 174
- The Queensway, in Toronto and Mississauga, Ontario
- York Regional Road 12 or Queensway, in Georgina Township, Ontario

=== Hong Kong ===
- Queensway (Hong Kong)

=== India ===
- Queensway, New Delhi, now Janpath, a road in New Delhi

=== Singapore ===
- Queensway, a road in the Queenstown area

=== United Kingdom ===
- Queensway (Birmingham), West Midlands
- Queensway, London
- Queensway, Wellingborough, Northamptonshire
- Queensway, Cheshire, a road in Widnes and part of the A557 road
- Queensway Tunnel, in Merseyside
- Queensway, part of the A726 road within East Kilbride, Scotland

==== Gibraltar ====
- Queensway, Gibraltar

== Other uses ==
- Queensway (horse), a racehorse
- Queensway (New York City), a planned conversion of the former Rockaway Beach Branch of the Long Island Rail Road to a linear park
- Queensway (Stevenage), a shopping centre
- Queensway (retailer), a defunct furniture retailer
- Queensway Secondary School, Singapore
- Queensway tube station, in London
- Queensway Stadium, stadium in Wrexham, Wales
- Queensway Garage, one of Toronto Transits bus garages
- Queensway Health center, Toronto

== See also ==
- Kingsway (disambiguation)
- Queensway-Humber Bay, a neighbourhood in Toronto
