= Via Imperii =

Trade route in the Holy Roman Empire

- Imperial Road
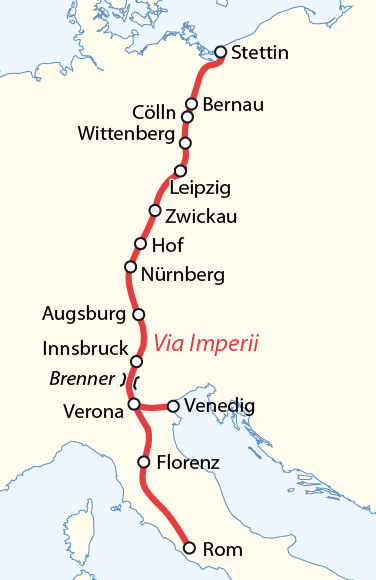

Route information
- Length: 1,800 km (1,100 mi)
- Time period: Antiquity, medieval

Major junctions
- From: Stettin
- To: Rome

Location
- Countries: West Pomerania, Brandenburg, Sachsen, Sachsen-Anhalt, Bayern, Austria, Trentino, Tuscany, Lazio

Highway system
- International E-road network; A Class; B Class

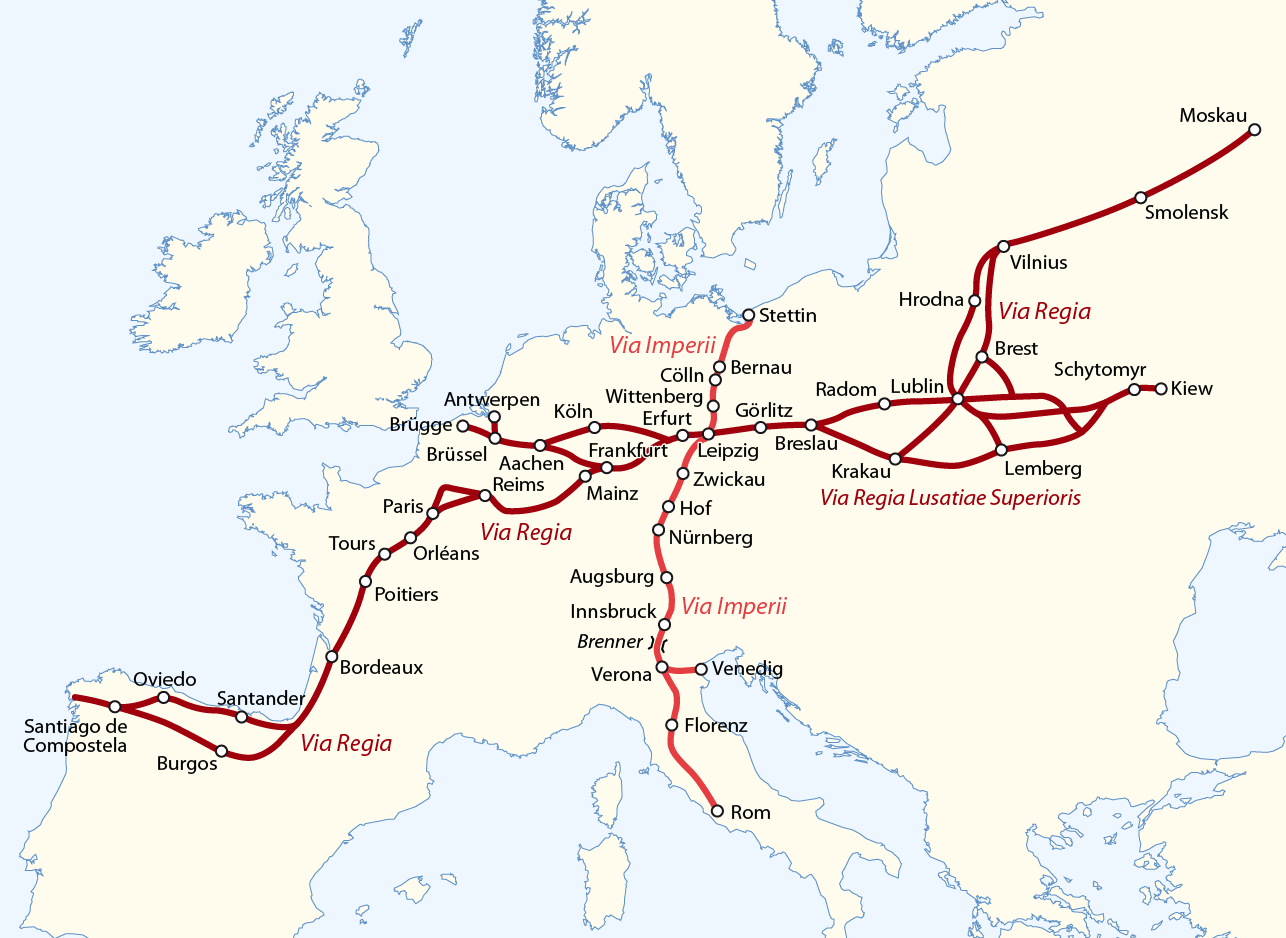
Via Imperii and Via Regia

Via Imperii (Imperial Road) was one of the most important of a class of roads known collectively as imperial roads (German: Reichsstraßen) of the Holy Roman Empire. This old trade route ran in a south–north direction from Venice on the Adriatic Sea and Verona in the Kingdom of Italy across the Brenner Pass through Germany to the Baltic coast passing the following cities:

- Innsbruck in the County of Tyrol
- Augsburg in the Prince-Bishopric of Augsburg
- the Imperial city of Nuremberg
- Bayreuth, Berneck, Münchberg and Hof in the Principality of Bayreuth
- Plauen, Mylau and Reichenbach in the Vogtland region
- Zwickau, Altenburg, Regis, Borna, Markkleeberg and Connewitz in the Margraviate of Meissen
- Leipzig – intersection with east–west Via Regia
- Wittenberg in Saxe-Wittenberg
- Cölln/Berlin, capital of Brandenburg
- Bernau bei Berlin
- Stettin in the Duchy of Pomerania

The cities on the route held the privilege of staple right, merchants were obliged to use the toll road and in turn enjoyed protection by the Imperial authority under the terms of the Landfrieden.

Parts of the historic route are today marked by the Italian Strada Statale No. 12, the Austrian Landesstraßen B 182 and B 177 and the German Bundesstraße 2.
