= Kingsway underpass =

Kingsway Underpass may refer to:

- The Kingsway Tunnel in Liverpool
- The former Kingsway tramway subway in Holborn
- The Strand underpass in London
