= History of Panama (to 1821) =

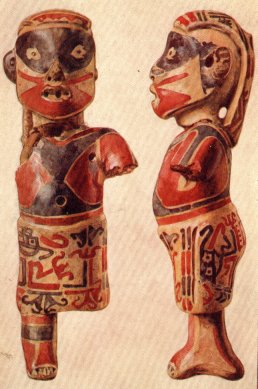
Pre-Columbian ceramic figure from Talamancan, Panama

The early history of Panama encompasses pre-contact Indigenous civilization and the subsequent era of European colonization. Archaeological evidence reveals sophisticated pre-Columbian societies, including Uto-Aztecan communities and advanced agricultural settlements.

When Spanish settlers first arrived, the Isthmus of Panama was home to numerous Indigenous groups, with the Guna people alone estimated at 750,000 individuals. Spanish colonization began in 1501 with Rodrigo de Bastidas, followed by Christopher Columbus and Vasco Núñez de Balboa, who found the Pacific Ocean in 1513.

Under Spanish colonial rule, Panama became a crucial transit point for Peruvian gold and silver, though this period was marked by significant Indigenous population decline and assimilation, the introduction of African enslaved people, and the emergence of maroon communities. The route became known as the Camino Real de Portobelo, or Royal Road of Portobelo, although it was more commonly known as Camino Real de Cruces (Royal Road of the Crosses) because the road led to the Town of Venta Cruces located on the Rio Chagres. The Spanish established strict control over trade through Panama, making it one of only three authorized ports in Spanish America for trade with Spain, while also implementing a complex administrative system through audiencias and later incorporation into the Viceroyalty of Peru. Panama was part of the Spanish Empire for nearly 300 years, from 1538 to 1821.

The colonial experience also spawned Panamanian nationalism as well as a racially complex and highly stratified society, the source of internal conflicts that ran counter to the unifying force of nationalism.

== Indigenous pre-colonial history ==
Uto-Aztecan communities were distributed from the Columbia River through North America, Central America, with some extending into Panama.

A tomb was built between 750 and 800 AD located in the modern-day El Caño Archaeological Park in the Coclé Province of Panama. It was dedicated to a lord who was believed to have been in his thirties. The tomb contained a set of bracelets, two bells, bone flutes, gold circular plates, belts made of gold beads, gold earrings with a sperm whale tooth base, crocodile-shaped earrings, human-shaped earrings, skirts, and canine-teeth bracelets. The tomb also contained what are believed to be human sacrifice victims. High-status people could be buried with eight to 32 people at times.

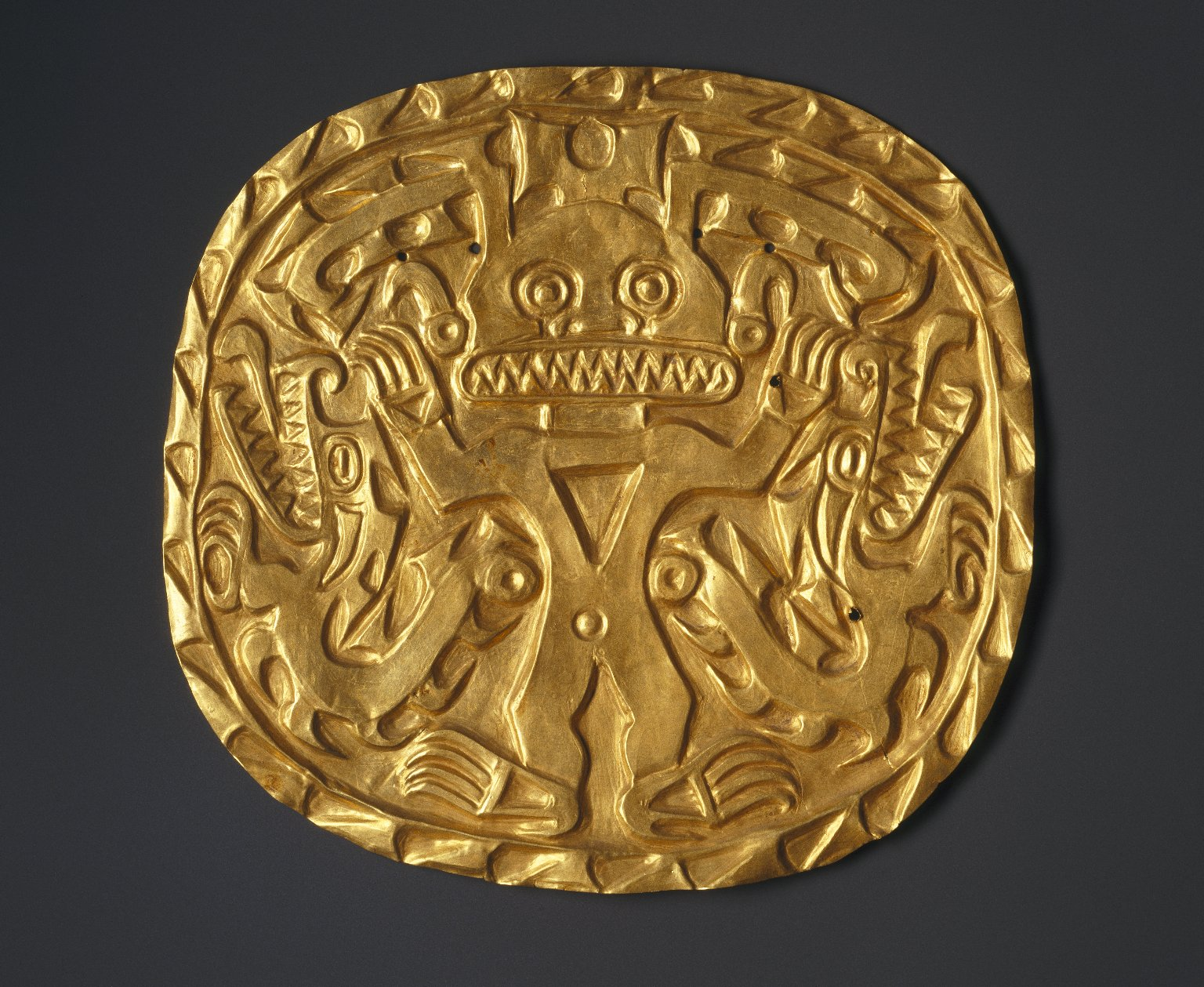
Plaque with Crocodile Deity, ca. 700–900. Brooklyn Museum; In Panama the Crocodile God was the principal deity for more than a thousand years and was most likely associated with strength, the sun and water, and fertility.

Dating to approximately 1350-1290 Cal BP, the first evidence of pre-Columbian ridged fields in Panama was discovered near Santa Cruz de Chinina in Eastern Panama. There were 22 blocks of parallel agricultural banks and ditches covering 30 hectares. The complex, located near the Bayano River estuary, incorporated sophisticated water-retention systems and was associated with a settlement site designated as Chinina 1, situated 50 meters north of the raised fields. The settlement site and raised fields demonstrated agricultural practices in rainforest environments. These suggested cultural connection between eastern Panama and the Caribbean plains of Colombia during the pre-Columbian era.

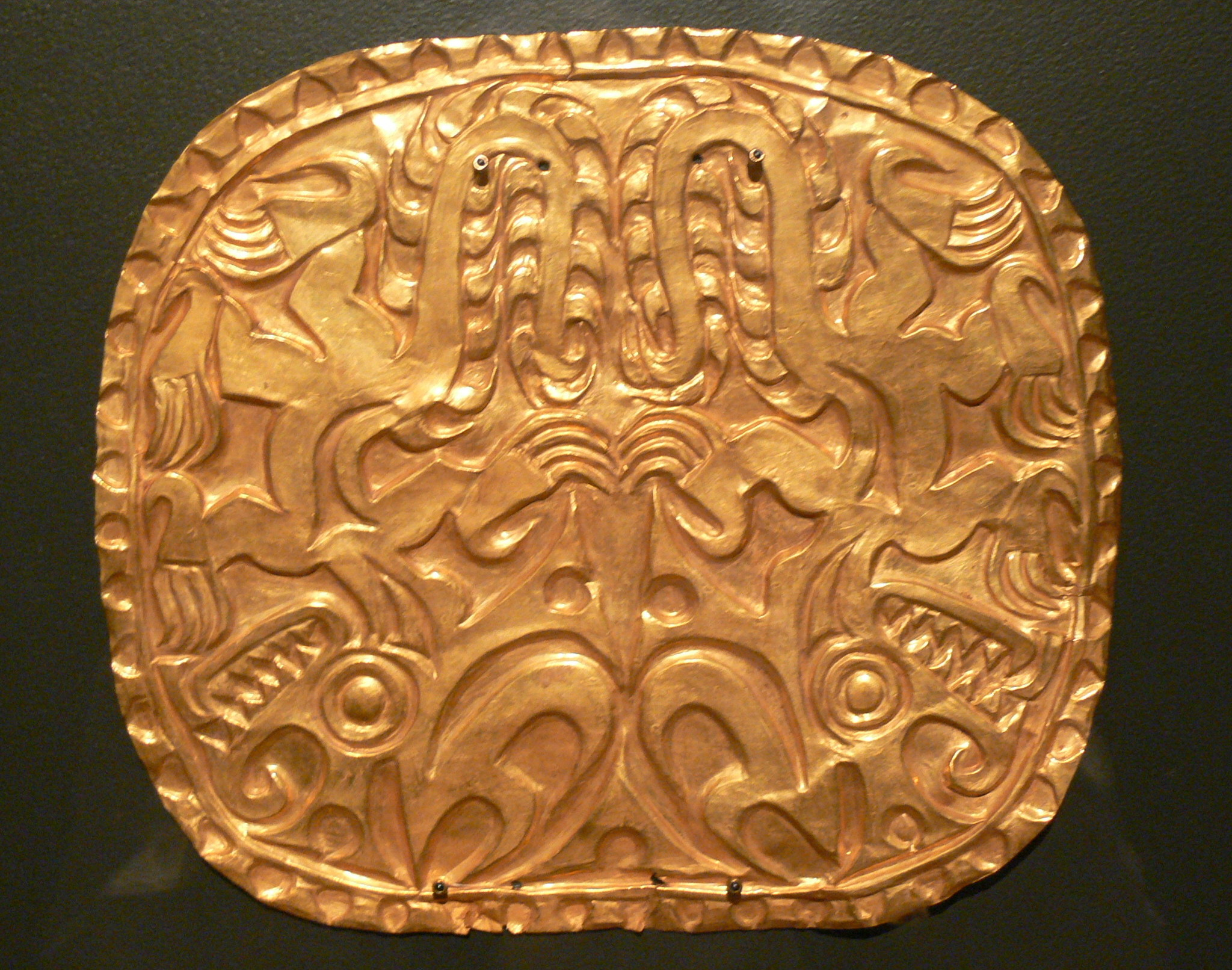
Amerindian gold plaque from Panama, 500–1000 AD

Predominantly, there existed the Guna, the Guaymí and the Chocó peoples. The Guaymí, of the highlands near the Costa Rican border, are believed to be related to Indigenous people of Nahuatlan and Mayan descent originating from Mexico and Central America. The Chocó on the Pacific side of Darién Province appear to be related to the Chibcha of Colombia.

Among all three Indigenous groups— the Guna, Guaymí, and Chocó— land was communally owned and farmed. In addition to hunting and fishing, the Indigenous people raised corn, cotton, cacao, various root crops, vegetables and fruits. They lived in circular thatched huts and slept in hammocks. Villages specialized in producing certain goods, and traders moved among them along the rivers and coastal waters in dugout canoes. Indigenous people were skillful potters, stonecutters, goldsmiths, and silversmiths. Some people wore ornaments, including breastplates and earrings of beaten gold.

The Guna, now settled mainly in Guna Yala along the Caribbean coast of modern-day Panama, have origins that remain debated despite their Caribbean cultural classification. Ethnologists have also indicated the possibility of a linguistic connection between the name Guna and certain Arawak and Carib groups. The possibility of cultural links with the Andean Indigenous people has been postulated, and some scholars have noted linguistic and other affinities with the Chibcha. Migration patterns through Colombia's valleys toward the isthmus may have influenced their settlement.

Historical connections have been proposed between the Guna and both the Cueva and Coiba peoples, though some researchers suggest they may represent a distinct, mostly extinct linguistic group. Guna oral traditions vary, with some claiming Carib ancestry while others cite their divine creation by Olokkuppilele at Mount Tacarcuna near Colombia's Río Atrato.

Chocó peoples have practiced traditional shifting cultivation for thousands of years. Subsistence needs were the primary driver of land use patterns, traditional norms, and settlement history. The eastern Panamanian landscape was previously an old-growth forest or an advanced successional stage.

Archaeologists have found buried, datable Indigenous Panamanian artifacts representing imagery of cats, which depicted socially meaningful strata. However, these studies have faced significant challenges due to widespread archaeological looting. This preservation crisis represents an obstacle to understanding the relationship between felids and pre-Columbian Panamanian societies, but archeological evidence has been found.

Abya Yala is a term from the Guna language that predates the arrival of Columbus and is used to refer to the American continent. It means 'land in full maturity' or 'land of vital blood'.

== Initial colonization period ==
When Spanish settlers first encountered Panama in the early 16th century, the isthmus was home to a diverse indigenous population, with estimates ranging from 500,000 across 60 groups to 750,000 Guna people alone. At the time of colonization, the region was primarily inhabited by three major Indigenous groups. This included the Guna, the Guaymí related to Nahuatlan and Mayan peoples, and the Chocó/Embera-Wounaan linked to Colombian Chibcha. These societies practiced communal land, engaged in agriculture, hunting, and fishing, and demonstrated craftsmanship in pottery, stonework, and metallurgy. The common use of gold body ornamentation reinforced the Spanish myth of El Dorado, the city of gold.

The Vizcaina from Columbus's 1501 voyage sunk off the coast of Panama with an estimated $50 million inside. Rodrigo de Bastidas, a wealthy notary public from Seville, was the first of many Spanish explorers to reach the isthmus. Sailing westward from Venezuela in 1501 in search of gold, he explored some 150 kilometers of the coastal area before heading for the West Indies. A year later, Christopher Columbus, on his fourth voyage to the New World, touched several points on the isthmus. One was a horseshoe-shaped harbor that he named Puerto Bello (beautiful port), later renamed Portobelo.

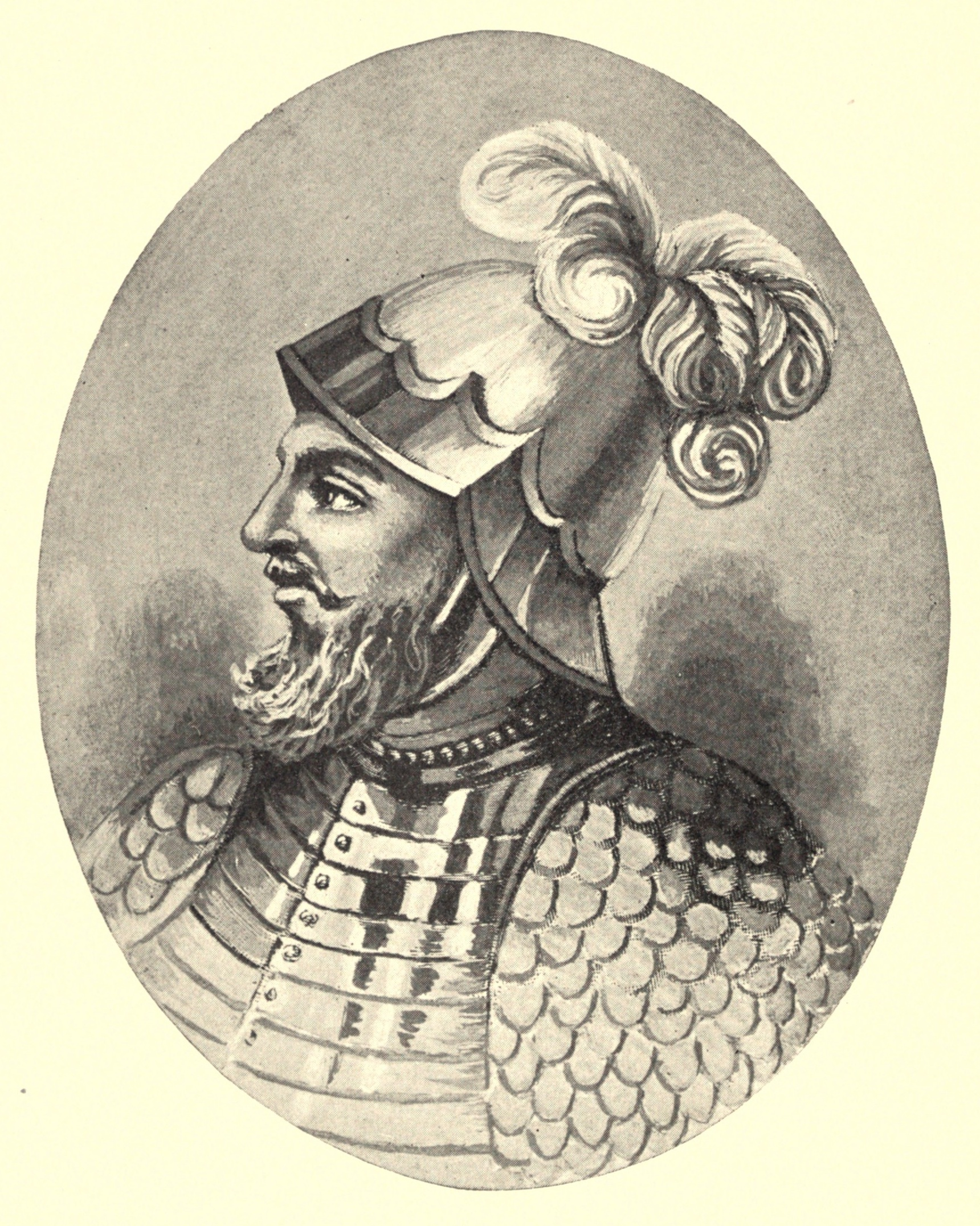
Vasco Núñez de Balboa served as co-mayor of Antigua del Darién.

Vasco Núñez de Balboa, a member of Rodrigo de Bastidas' ship crew, settled in Hispaniola, the present-day island of the Dominican Republic and Haiti. However, he stowed away on a voyage to Panama in 1510 to escape his creditors.

In 1510, around 800 Spaniards lived on the isthmus. However, diseases including malaria and yellow fever had killed 740 of them. The settlers at the first city to be duly constituted by the Spanish crown, Antigua del Darién, deposed the crown's representative governing the area and elected Balboa and Martin Zamudio as co-mayors.

Balboa insisted that the settlers plant crops rather than depend solely on supply ships, and Antigua became a monetarily prosperous community. Like other conquistadors, Balboa led raids on Indigenous towns. However, unlike most, he proceeded to befriend certain Indigenous groups. He took the daughter of a chief as his lifelong mistress.

On September 1, 1513, Balboa, accompanied by 190 Spaniards including Francisco Pizarro who later fought the Inca Empire in Peru, a pack of dogs, and 1,000 Indigenous enslaved people, spent twenty-five days hacking their way through the rainforest. The party then gazed on the vast expanse of the Pacific Ocean. Balboa, in full armor, waded into the Pacific and claimed that the sea of its shores was for his God and his King Ferdinand. Balboa returned to Antigua del Darién in January 1514 with 190 soldiers, cotton cloth, pearls, and 40,000 pesos in gold.

Between 1515 and 1517, Spanish expeditions found more than 30,000 pesos worth of gold from the Bay of San Miguel and the Pearl Islands in the Gulf of Panama.

Simultaneously, Balboa's enemies had denounced him in the Spanish court, and King Ferdinand appointed a new governor for the colony. At this time, the colony's name was Castilla de Oro. The new governor was named Pedro Arias de Avila, who became known as Pedrarias the Cruel. He charged Balboa with treason. In 1517, Balboa was arrested, brought to the court of Pedrarias, and executed.

In 1519, Pedrarias moved the colonial capital away from the rainforest climate and the resistant Indigenous people of the Darién. They moved to a fishing village on the Pacific coast, about four kilometers east of the present-day capital. The Indigenous people in the area called the village Panama, meaning "plenty of fish".

In the same year, Nombre de Dios, Colón, a deserted early settlement, was resettled until the end of the 16th century. It served as the Spanish Caribbean port for trans-isthmian transport traffic. A trail known as the El Camino Real, or royal road, linked Panama and Nombre de Dios in Colón. Along this trail, which can still be followed to the modern day, gold from Peru and Spanish galleons were carried by muleback from coast to coast.

The increasing importance of the isthmus for transporting treasure and the delay and difficulties posed by the Camino Real inspired surveys ordered by the Spanish crown in the 1520s and 1530s to ascertain the feasibility of constructing a canal. The idea was finally abandoned in mid-century by King Philip II (1556–98), who concluded that if God had wanted a canal there, He would have built one.

Pedrarias' governorship proved to be disastrous. Hundreds of Spaniards died of disease and starvation in their brocaded silk clothing; thousands of Indigenous people were robbed, enslaved, and massacred. Thousands more of the Indigenous people succumbed to European diseases to which they had no natural immunity. After the atrocities of Pedrarias, most of the Indigenous people fled to remote areas to avoid the Spaniards.

The regulations for colonial administration set forth by the Spanish king's Council of the Indies decreed that the Indigenous people were to be protected and converted to Christianity. The colonies, however, were far from the seat of ultimate responsibility, and few administrators were guided by the humane spirit of those regulations. The Roman Catholic Church, and particularly the Franciscan order, showed some concern for the welfare of the Indigenous people, but on the whole, church efforts were inadequate to the situation.

The Indigenous people, nevertheless, found one effective benefactor among their Spanish oppressors. Bartolomé de las Casas, the first priest ordained in the West Indies, was outraged by the persecution of the Indigenous people. He freed his own enslaved people, returned to Spain, and persuaded the council to adopt stronger measures against enslaving the Indigenous people. He made one suggestion that he later regretted—that Africans, whom the Spaniards considered less than human, be imported to replace the Indigenous people as enslaved labor.

In 1517 King Charles V (1516–56) granted a concession for exporting 4,000 African enslaved people to the Antilles. Thus the slave trade began and flourished for more than 200 years. Panama was a major distribution point for enslaved people headed elsewhere on the mainland. The supply of Indigenous labor had been depleted by the mid-16th century, however, and Panama began to absorb many of the enslaved people. A large number of enslaved people on the isthmus escaped into the jungle. They became known as cimarrones, meaning wild or unruly, because they attacked travelers along the Camino Real. An official census of Panama City in 1610 listed 548 citizens, 303 women, 156 children, 146 mulattoes, 148 Antillean blacks, and 3,500 African enslaved people.

== Spanish colonial era ==
In Panama's colonial period, the Spanish crown transitioned from a system of licensed exploration to direct royal governance. The monarchy appointed governors and administrative staff who were compensated through colonial revenues. These royal officials had strict oversight responsibilities, particularly regarding the collection and protection of valuable resources like gold and pearls. Their primary duty was ensuring the Crown received its share of colonial wealth through trade, conquest, and resource extraction.

The colonial economy in Panama was built on the encomienda system, where indigenous people were forced to work in exchange for nominal protection and Christian instruction. Panama's position as a staging ground for South American conquest established its early role as a crucial link in Spain's colonial empire.

In 1523, Pascual de Andagoya traveled along Panama's southern coast, gathering information from local Indigenous people about a rich territory called Birú, later known as part of the Inca Empire.

Francisco Pizarro, who established himself as a colonial landowner in Panama with multiple mines and encomiendas, used Panama as his launch point for the conquest of the Inca Empire. His initial expedition departed from Panama in November 1524 with 112 Spaniards. After several failed attempts and a return to Panama, Pizarro used the isthmus as a base for organizing his successful subjugation of the Inca Empire, departing again in 1531.

Governors had some summary powers of justice, but audiencias (courts) were also established. The first such audiencia, in Santo Domingo, Hispaniola, had jurisdiction over the whole area of conquest. As settlement spread, other audiencias were set up. By a decree of 1538, all Spanish territory from Nicaragua to Cape Horn was to be administered from an audiencia in Panama. This audiencia lasted only until 1543 because of the impossibility of exercising jurisdiction over so vast an area. A new Panamanian audiencia, with jurisdiction over an area more nearly coinciding with the territory of present-day Panama, was established in 1563. The viceroy's position was revived for the rich empires of Mexico and Peru. After 1567 Panama was attached to the Viceroyalty of Peru but retained its own audiencia.

Beginning early in the 16th century, Nombre de Dios in Panama, Vera Cruz in Mexico, and Cartagena in Colombia were the only three ports in Spanish America authorized by the crown to trade with the homeland. By the mid-1560s, the system became regularized, and two fleets sailed annually from Spain, one to Mexico, and the other to southern ports. These fleets would then rendezvous at Havana and return together to Cádiz, Spain. In principle, this rigid system remained in effect until the 18th century. From the middle of the 17th century, however, as the strength and prosperity of Spain declined, annual visits became the exception.

Shipments of bullion and goods were to be delivered to Panama on the Pacific side for transport over the isthmus and return to Spain. Panama's own contribution to the loading of the fleet was relatively small. Gold production was never great, and little exportable surplus of agricultural and forest products was available. Nothing was manufactured; in fact, Spain discouraged the production of finished goods. The colony's prosperity, therefore, fluctuated with the volume of trade, made up largely of Peruvian shipments. When the Inca gold was exhausted, great quantities of silver mined in Peru replaced gold in trade for 150 years, supplemented eventually by sugar, cotton, wine, indigo, cinchona, vanilla, and cacao.

Spain had banned Indigenous slavery, so the colonists started importing African enslaved people. By 1565, there were 7 African enslaved people for every European. Many African slaves ran away and joined up with escaped Indigenous enslaved people and remnants of the local Indigenous population. An enslaved person called Felipillo founded a village of Africans and Indigenous people in the mangroves of the Gulf of San Miguel that lasted two years before being wiped out in 1551. Escaped enslaved people, or maroons, soon outnumbered the European population and they defeated Spanish expeditions against them in 1554 and 1555.

Except for traffic in African enslaved people, foreign trade was forbidden unless the goods passed through Spain. Africans were brought to the colonies on contract (asiento) by Portuguese, English, Dutch, and French owners of enslaved people, who were forbidden to trade in any other commodities. Spanish efforts to retain their monopoly on the rich profits from trade with their colonies provided a challenge to the rising maritime nations of Europe. Intermittent maritime warfare resulted in the Caribbean and later in the Pacific. The first serious interference with trade came from the English.

From 1572 to 1597, Francis Drake was associated with most of the assaults on Panama. Drake's activities demonstrated the indefensibility of the open roadstead of Nombre de Dios. In 1597 the Atlantic terminus of the trans-isthmian route was moved to Portobelo, one of the best natural harbors anywhere on the Spanish Main (the mainland of Spanish America). Drake allied with the Cimarron people, the local population based around escaped enslaved people.

=== Seventeenth Century ===
Despite raids on shipments and ports, the registered legal import of precious metals increased threefold between 1550 and 1600. Panama's prosperity was at its peak during the first part of the 17th century. This was the time of the famous ferias (fairs, or exchange markets) of Portobelo, where European merchandise could be purchased to supply the commerce of the whole west coast south of Nicaragua. When a feria ended, Portobelo would revert to its quiet existence as a small seaport and garrison town.

Panama City also flourished on the profits of trade. Following reconstruction after a serious fire in 1644, contemporary accounts credit Panama City with 1,400 residences "of all types" (probably including slave huts); most business places, religious houses, and substantial residences were rebuilt of stone. Panama City was considered, after Mexico City and Lima, the most beautiful and opulent settlement in the West Indies.

Interest in a canal project was revived early in the 17th century by Philip III of Spain (1598–1621). The Council of the Indies dissuaded the king, arguing that a canal would draw attack from other European nations—an indication of the decline of Spanish sea power. The Spanish galleon San José sank off the coast of Panama in 1631.

During the first quarter of the 17th century, trade between Spain and the isthmus remained undisturbed. At the same time, England, France, and the Netherlands, one or all almost constantly at war with Spain, began seizing colonies in the Caribbean. Such footholds in the West Indies encouraged the development of the buccaneers—English, French, Dutch, and Portuguese adventurers who preyed on Spanish shipping and ports with the tacit or open support of their governments. Because of their numbers and the closeness of their bases, the buccaneers were more effective against Spanish trade than the English had been during the previous century.

The volume of registered precious metal arriving in Spain fell from its peak in 1600; by 1660 volume was less than the amount registered a century before. Depletion of Peruvian mines, an increase in smuggling, and the buccaneers were causes of the decline.

Henry Morgan, a buccaneer who had held Portobelo for ransom in 1668, returned to Panama with a stronger force at the end of 1670. On January 29, 1671, Morgan appeared at Panama City. With 1,400 men he defeated the garrison of 2,600 in pitched battle outside the city, which he then looted. The officials and citizens fled, some to the country and others to Peru, having loaded their ships with the most important church and government funds and treasure. Panama City was destroyed by fire, probably from blown up powder stores, although the looters were blamed. After 4 weeks, Morgan left with 175 mule loads of loot and 600 prisoners. Two years later, a new city was founded at the location of the present-day capital and was heavily fortified.

The buccaneer scourge rapidly declined after 1688 mainly because of changing European alliances. By this time Spain was chronically bankrupt; its population had fallen; and it suffered internal government mismanagement and corruption.

Influenced by buccaneer reports about the ease with which the isthmus could be crossed—which suggested the possibility of digging a canal—William Paterson, founder and ex-governor of the Bank of England, organized a Scottish company to establish a colony in the San Blas area. Paterson landed on the Caribbean coast of the Darién late in 1698 with about 1,200 persons. Although well received by the Indigenous people (as was anyone not Spanish), the colonists were poorly prepared for life in the tropics with its attendant diseases. Their notion of trade goods—European clothing, wigs, and English Bibles—was of little interest to the Indigenous people. These colonists gave up after six months, unknowingly passing at sea reinforcements totaling another 1,600 people. The Spanish reacted to these new arrivals by establishing a blockade from the sea. The English capitulated and left in April 1700, having lost many lives, mostly from malnutrition and disease.

=== Eighteenth century ===
In Spain, Bourbon kings replaced the Habsburgs in 1700, and some liberalization of trade was introduced. These measures were too late for Panama, however. Spain's desperate efforts to maintain its colonial trade monopoly had been self-defeating. Cheaper goods supplied by England, France, and the Netherlands were welcomed by colonial officials and private traders alike. Dealing in contraband increased to the detriment of official trade. Fewer merchants came to the Portobelo feria to pay Spain's inflated prices because the foreign suppliers furnished cheaper goods at any port at which they could slip by or bribe the coastal guards. The situation worsened; only five of the previously annual fleets were dispatched to Latin America between 1715 and 1736, a circumstance that increased contraband operations.

Panama's temporary loss of its independent audiencia, from 1718 to 1722, and the country's attachment to the Viceroyalty of Peru were probably engineered by powerful Peruvian merchants. They resented the venality of Panamanian officials and their ineffectiveness in suppressing the pirates (outlaws of no flag, as distinct from the buccaneers of the 17th century). Panama's weakness was further shown by its inability to protect itself against an invasion by the Miskito Indigenous people of Nicaragua, who attacked from Laguna de Chiriquí. Another Indigenous uprising in the valley of the Río Tuira caused the whites to abandon the Darién.

The final blow to Panama's shrinking control of the transit trade between Latin America and Spain came before the mid-18th century. As a provision of the Treaty of Utrecht at the end of the War of the Spanish Succession in 1713, Britain secured the right to supply African enslaved people to the Spanish colonies (4,800 a year for 30 years) and also to send 1 ship a year to Portobelo. The trade of enslaved people provision satisfied both countries, but the trade in goods did not. Smuggling by British ships continued, and a highly organized contraband trade based in Jamaica—with the collusion of Panamanian merchants—nearly wiped out the legal trade. By 1739 the importance of the isthmus to Spain had seriously declined; Spain again suppressed Panama's autonomy by making the region part of the Viceroyalty of New Granada (encompassing present-day Colombia, Venezuela, Ecuador, and Panama).

In the same year, war broke out between Britain and Spain. A British military force took Portobelo and destroyed it. Panamanian historians maintain that this attack diverted Spanish trade from the trans-isthmian route. The Seville–Cádiz monopoly of colonial trade had been breached by royal decrees earlier in the century, and precedent was thus furnished for the merchants of the Latin American colonies to agitate for direct trade with Spain and for intercolonial trade. After 1740 the Pacific coast ports were permitted to trade directly via ships rounding Cape Horn, and the Portobelo feria was never held again.

Relaxing the trading laws benefited both Spanish America and Spain, but Panama's economic decline was serious. Transit trade had for so long furnished the profits on which Panama had flourished that there had been no incentive to develop any other economic base. After the suppression of its audiencia in 1751, Panama became a quiet backwater, a geographically isolated appendage of New Granada, scarcely self-supporting even in food and producing little for export.

In 1793, near the close of the colonial period, the first recorded attempt at a comprehensive census of the area that had comprised the Panamanian audiencia was made. Incomplete and doubtless omitting most of the Indigenous and cimarrón population, specifically excluding soldiers and priests, the census recorded 71,888 inhabitants, 7,857 of whom lived in Panama City. Other principal towns had populations ranging from 2,000 to a little over 5,000.

Social hierarchy in the colony was rigid. The most prestigious and rewarding positions were reserved for the peninsulares , those actually born in Spain. Criollos, those of Spanish ancestry but born in the colonies, occupied secondary posts in government and trade. Mestizos, usually offspring of Hispanic fathers and Indigenous mothers, engaged in farming, retail trade, and the provision of services. African and Indigenous enslaved people constituted an underclass. To the extent possible, Indigenous people who escaped enslavement avoided Hispanic society altogether.

The church held a special place in society. Priests accompanied every expedition and were always counselors to the temporal leaders. The first bishop on the mainland came with Pedrarias. The bishop's authority, received from the king, made him in effect a vice governor. The bishopric was moved from Darién to Panama City in 1521. The relationship between church and government in the colony was closer than in Spain. Both the Roman Catholic Church and the monastic orders gained great wealth through tithes and land acquisition.

== Independence from Spain ==
Lacking communication except by sea, which the Spanish generally controlled, Panama remained aloof from the early efforts of the Spanish colonies to separate from Spain. Revolutionaries of other colonies, however, did not hesitate to use Panama's strategic potential as a pawn in revolutionary maneuvers. General Francisco de Miranda of Venezuela, who had been attracting support for revolutionary activities as early as 1797, offered a canal concession to Britain in return for aid. Thomas Jefferson, while minister to France, also showed interest in a canal, but the isolationist policies of the new United States and the absorption of energies and capital in continental expansion prevented serious consideration.

Patriots from Cartagena attempted to take Portobelo in 1814 and again in 1819, and a naval effort from liberated Chile succeeded in capturing the island of Taboga in the Bay of Panama. Panama's first act of separation from Spain came without violence. When Simón Bolívar's victory at Boyacá on August 7, 1819, clinched the liberation of New Granada, the Spanish viceroy fled Colombia for Panama, where he ruled harshly until his death in 1821. His replacement in Panama, a liberal constitutionalist, permitted a free press and the formation of patriotic associations. Raising troops locally, he soon sailed for Ecuador, leaving a native Panamanian, Colonel José de Fábrega, as acting governor.

Panama City immediately initiated plans to declare independence, but the city of Los Santos preempted the move by proclaiming freedom from Spain on November 10, 1821. This act precipitated a meeting in Panama City on November 28, which is celebrated as the official date of independence.
