= Kingsway, Southport =

Kingsway
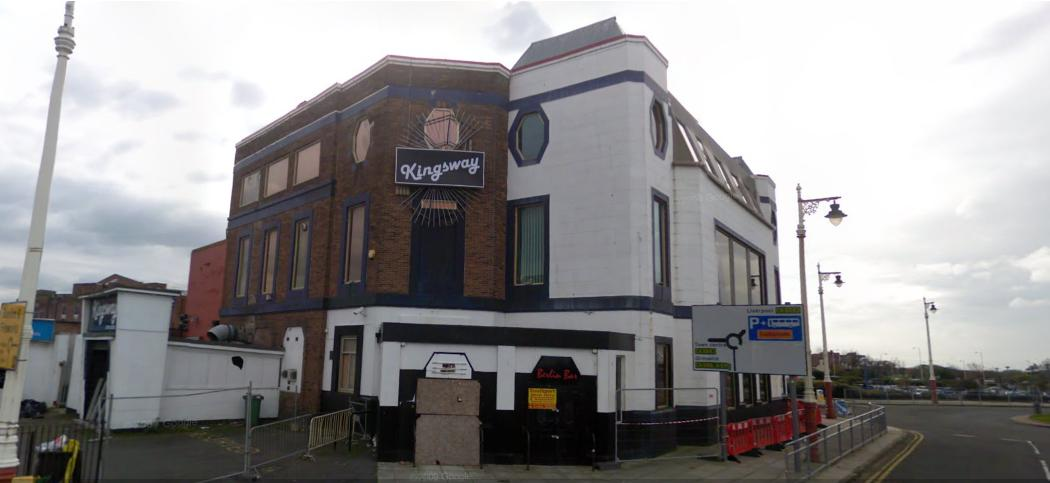
- The Kingsway during renovation in 2006

- Location within Merseyside

General information
- Architectural style: Art Deco
- Location: Southport, England
- Coordinates: 53.64646°N 3.012373°W
- Completed: 1931
- Demolished: 8 September 2010 (following fire)

Technical details
- Structural system: Brick

Kingsway (also known as Kingsway Club, and Bliss) was a nightclub and casino built in 1931 at the south end of the Promenade in the seaside resort of Southport, Merseyside, England. In the 1960s it hosted many well-known celebrities, such as The Beatles, Tom Jones, and Engelbert Humperdinck. It was also very popular during the 1980s punk era and the 1990s dance era.

The nightclub and bar closed in 2004 and reopened for a short time during 2006 before closing its doors for the last time in 2007. In 2008 plans were put forward to demolish the site and build a luxury hotel, apartments and retail complex, none of which came to fruition. On 6 September 2010, a major fire destroyed the derelict building. The building was demolished two days later.

== History ==
The Kingsway was built in the 1931 in an art deco style with large portrait windows and hexagonal turrets with hexagonal windows. It was constructed over three floors, the basement being a bar, the ground floor being a nightclub, and the top floor being a casino.

On 22 January 1962 the Beatles had their first gig at Kingsway, which was then known as the Kingsway Club. On 5 February 1962, Ringo Starr made his debut with the Beatles at Kingsway when he replaced then-drummer Pete Best, who was ill at the time. The Beatles are known to have made 7 appearances at the Kingsway in 1962 before moving onto bigger projects and fame.

The Kingsway also hosted performances by Tom Jones, Engelbert Humperdinck, Norman Wisdom (while filming What's Good for the Goose film at the Birkdale Palace Hotel in 1969), Larry Grayson, Tom O'Connor, and Cilla Black. Golfer Lee Trevino visited the casino of the Kingsway during the Open Golf in the 1960s.

In the 1960s, 1980s and 1990s, the Kingsway was Southport's major nightclub, attracting very large crowds of partygoers every weekend. Cabaret acts were booked for the week, and audiences were thin on the ground Monday to Thursday; and for a comedian it was a hard club to work on those nights. In the late 1990s it was renamed "Bliss". It also added a bingo hall.

The Kingsway was closed in 2003 and reopened in November 2006. The nightclub was reopened as "Kingsway" and the bar re-opened as "Berlin's Bar" by well known club owner Paul Clarke. This new start was short-lived; the nightclub closed the following year. Longest serving member of staff was DJ Jay 19 years hosting and djing over nearly 2 decades.

For the next 3 years, the building stood empty and fell into disrepair. In 2008, a £9 million plan was announced to demolish the site and build a 100-room hotel, 54 apartments, and 4,000 square feet (370 m^{2}) of retail space. However, none of the designs that were put forward came to a practical stage. Structural work in 2009 was carried out to support part of the building, as it had become unsafe.

=== Fire ===
On 6 September 2010, a major fire destroyed the derelict building, attracting much attention from national media. The fire, with flames reaching 80 feet (24 m) high, was attended to by 50 firefighters and took 12 hours to extinguish. The southwest facade of the building collapsed onto the Kingsway road after the roof caved in during the fire.

The damage was so severe that demolition commenced on 8 September 2010. The roads around the building were closed due to the building's dangerous state and the risk of further collapse. A day after the demolition, a spokesperson for the Merseyside Fire and Rescue Department said that the blaze was caused by arson.
