= Kingsway (cigarette) =

Cigarette brand

- Product type: Cigarette
- Current owner: British American Tobacco
- Produced by: American Express of London/Ardath Tobacco Company
- Introduced: January 1959; 67 years ago
- Markets: See Markets
- Tagline: "Smoke the BIG way... the Modern way."

Kingsway is a cigarette brand that gained ground January 1959, and is currently owned by conglomerate British American Tobacco, and manufactured by its subsidiary American Express of London/Ardath Tobacco Company. In Ireland, the brand was manufactured by W.D. & H.O. Wills, and in Malaysia, the brand is manufactured by Rothmans International.

== History ==
Pack of Kingsway cigarettes

Kingsway was launched in January 1959, and several advertising campaigns were launched in the 1960s for the brand to gain more popularity, like for example in Ireland.

Kingsway was a popular cigarette brand in the 1960s and 1970s, but eventually lost appeal and disappeared from the European market after the 1980s. In Asia, and especially in Malaysia, the brand is still popular and sold today. Their slogan was "Smoke the BIG way... the Modern way."

Various cigarette lighters, tin boxes and ashtrays of Kingsway were also sold.

== Markets ==
The brand was or still is sold in the United Kingdom, Ireland, West Germany and Malaysia.

== See also ==
- Tobacco smoking
