= El Camino Real (Camper Van Beethoven album) =

Studio album by Camper Van Beethoven
- Released: May 30, 2014
- Studio: East Bay Recorders in Berkeley, California, United States; Guerrilla Recording in Oakland, California, United States; Sharkbite Studios in Oakland, California, United States; Various living rooms
- Genre: Alternative rock
- Length: 39:52
- Language: English
- Label: 429

Camper Van Beethoven chronology
La Costa Perdida (2013)	El Camino Real (2014)

El Camino Real is a 2014 studio album by American alternative rock band Camper Van Beethoven, a companion piece to La Costa Perdida released the year prior, which found the band with enough extra songs written to immediately record a second album. A concept album about Southern California, the work has received positive reviews from critics.

== Reception ==
Professional ratings
Aggregate scores
Source	Rating
Metacritic	66/100
Review scores
Source	Rating
AllMusic	3/5 stars
American Songwriter	2.5/5 stars
Consequence of Sound	B−
Louder Sound	3.5/5 stars
PopMatters	7/10
PopMatters	2/5 stars

According to the review aggregator Metacritic, El Camino Real received "generally favorable reviews" based on a weighted average score of 66 out of 100 from seven critic scores. Editors at AllMusic rated this album 3 out of 5 stars, with critic Mark Deming writing that this album has a more somber mood than La Costa Perdida and this release "finds them playing with a technical skill that puts their early classics to shame but sounding curiously short on the joy and spontaneity that were once this band's trademark". Hal Horowitz of American Songwriter rated this album 2.5 out of 5 stars, writing that "the music contains CVB’s mix of country, folk, rock and gypsy soul", but "the songwriting and general groove is not up to the quirky quality expected from CVB". Matt Melis of Consequence of Sound scored El Camino Real a B−, praising the "disconnect between the music and what Lowery’s actually singing" and summed up that "irony, tight songwriting, and a delightfully askew window on the world make any new Camper record worth a spin". In Louder Sound, Stephen Dalton highlighted that this music mixes "sardonic social commentary with sincerity", with "a surprisingly big-hearted, warm-blooded empathy" that draws comparison to Bruce Springsteen. PopMatters' John Garratt wrote that the band "do not seem too preoccupied with sounding like their former selves" on this recording and "no one else sounds quite like them" with their mix of "themes of work, joy, paranoia and peace"; his ranking was a 7 out of 10. In Record Collector, Paul McGuinness gave this work 2 out of 5 stars, ending his review, "There’s plenty of sun throughout, but it’s a rougher road and they’re a wearier set of travellers this time around... It feels as though CVB may have overstretched themselves with this second leg; while La Costa Perdida was worth the wait, El Camino Real leaves the listener having enjoyed the trip, but glad to be getting home."

== Track listing ==
1. "The Ultimate Solution" – 2:56
2. "It Was Like That When We Got Here" – 4:28
3. "Classy Dames and Able Gents" – 2:15
4. "Camp Pendleton" – 4:56
5. "Dockweiler Beach" – 2:50
6. "Sugartown" – 2:26
7. "I Live in LA" – 4:23
8. "Out Like a Lion" – 4:00
9. "Goldbase" – 3:50
10. "Darken Your Door" – 4:38
11. "Grasshopper" – 3:06

iTunes bonus tracks

12. "City of Industry" – 4:33
13. "Camp Pendleton" (demo) – 4:59
14. "Summer Days" – 5:40

== Personnel ==
Camper Van Beethoven

- Victor Krummenacher – bass guitar, guitar
- David Lowery – guitar, vocals
- Greg Lisher – guitar, lap steel guitar
- Jonathan Segel – guitar, keyboards, violin, mandolin, backing vocals
- Michael Urbano – drums, percussion

Additional personnel

- Myles Boisen – engineering at Guerrilla Recording
- Jason Carmer – engineering at Sharkbite Studios
- Joe Lambert – mastering
- Adam Myatt – engineering at East Bay Recorders
- Sanna Olsson – backing vocals
- Michael Rosen – engineering at East Bay Recorders
- Drew Vandenburg – mixing at Chase Park Transduction, Athens, Georgia, United States
- Michael Wertz – artwork, design

== See also ==
- List of 2014 albums
