= Kingsway, Swansea =

In Swansea, Kingsway may refer to:

- The Kingsway, a shopping street in the Swansea city centre
- Kingsway, a thoroughfare in the Fforestfach Industrial Estate
