= Kingsway Christian School =

Location
- 11138 Old Lincoln Way East; Orrville, Ohio 44667; United States
- Coordinates: 40°47′53″N 81°46′48″W

Information
- Type: Private Christian
- Religious affiliation: Non-Denominational Christian
- Established: 1992
- Superintendent: Larry Chambliss
- Principal: Larry Chambliss
- Teaching staff: 15.1 (on a FTE basis)
- Grades: PK–12
- Enrollment: 225, including 21 preschoolers (2015-2016)
- Student to teacher ratio: 10.2
- Colors: Navy & Green
- Athletics conference: Independent Christian Schools of Ohio (ICSO)
- Nickname: Eagles
- Affiliation: Association of Christian Schools International
- Website: www.kingswaychristianschool.net

Kingsway Christian School is a private, coeducational Christian school located south of Orrville, Ohio and west of Riceland. It serves students in grades K-12.

== History ==
Kingsway Christian was founded in 1992, originally having grades K–6. Beginning in 1997 the 7th grade was added and for the next five years each successive grade was added. Kingsway's first graduation was held in June 2003 when 17 students received their diplomas. The school is parent-sponsored and uses a non-denominational approach to Christian education. Kingsway is a member of Association of Christian Schools International (ACSI).

== Demographics ==
The demographic breakdown of the 154 K-12 students enrolled in 2015-2016 was:

- Black - 9.7%
- Hispanic - 4.6%
- White - 83.7%

== Athletics ==
The Kingsway Eagles provide a number of athletic opportunities for students including basketball (girls and boys teams, junior high and high school), volleyball (girls, junior high and high school), soccer (girls and boys teams, junior high and high school), baseball (high school only), and cheerleading (junior high and high school girls). The school is also a member of the OCSAA and the ICSO Athletic Conference.

OCSAA Girls Varsity Basketball State Final Four - 2019

OCSAA Girls Varsity Basketball State Champions - 2018

ICSO Varsity Girls Basketball State Champions - 2020

ICSO Varsity Girls Basketball Regular Season Champions - (2021-2022)

OCSAA Varsity Boys Basketball State Final Four - 2013

ICSO Varsity Boys Basketball State Final Four - 2021, 2023

ICSO Varsity Boys Basketball State Champions - 2023

NCSAA Division 4D Varsity Boys National Champions - 2016

OCSAA Varsity Girls Volleyball State final Four - 2018

OCSAA Varsity Soccer State Final Four - 2021

ICSO Varsity Boys Soccer State Champions - 2024
