= Shahdara =

Shahdara (lit. 'King's Way') may refer to:

- Shahdara Bagh, Punjab, Pakistan
- Shahdara district, Delhi, India
  - Shahdara (Delhi Assembly constituency)
  - Shahdara (Delhi Metro)
  - Delhi Shahdara Junction railway station

== See also ==
- Kingsway (disambiguation)
