= Via Regia =

European Cultural Route

- Royal Highway

Route information
- Length: 4,500 km (2,800 mi)
- Time period: Antiquity, medieval

Major junctions
- From: Moscow
- To: Santiago de Compostela

Location
- Countries: Russia; Belarus; Ukraine; Lithuania; Poland; Germany; Belgium; France; Spain

Highway system
- International E-road network; A Class; B Class

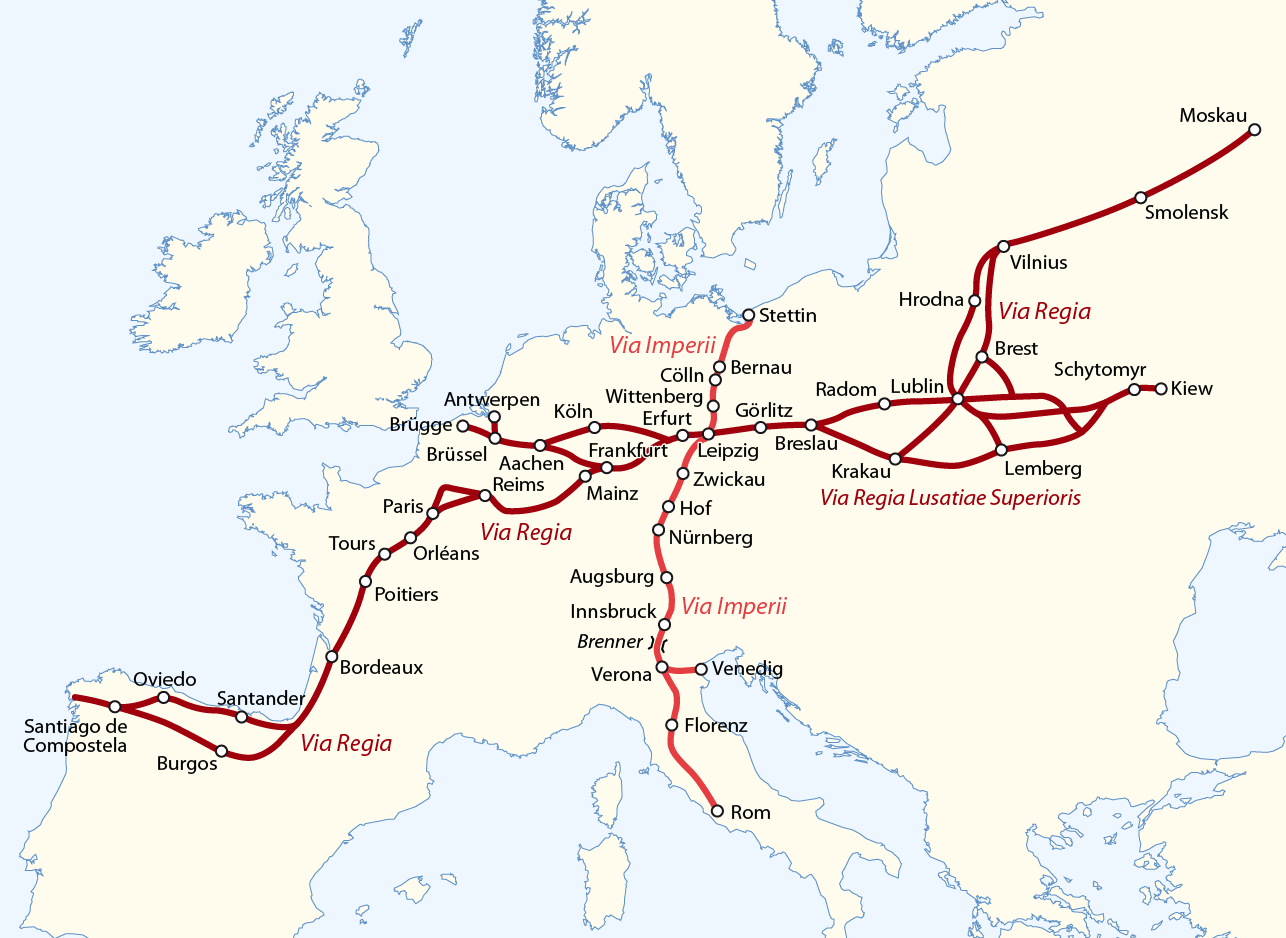
Via Regia and Via Imperii

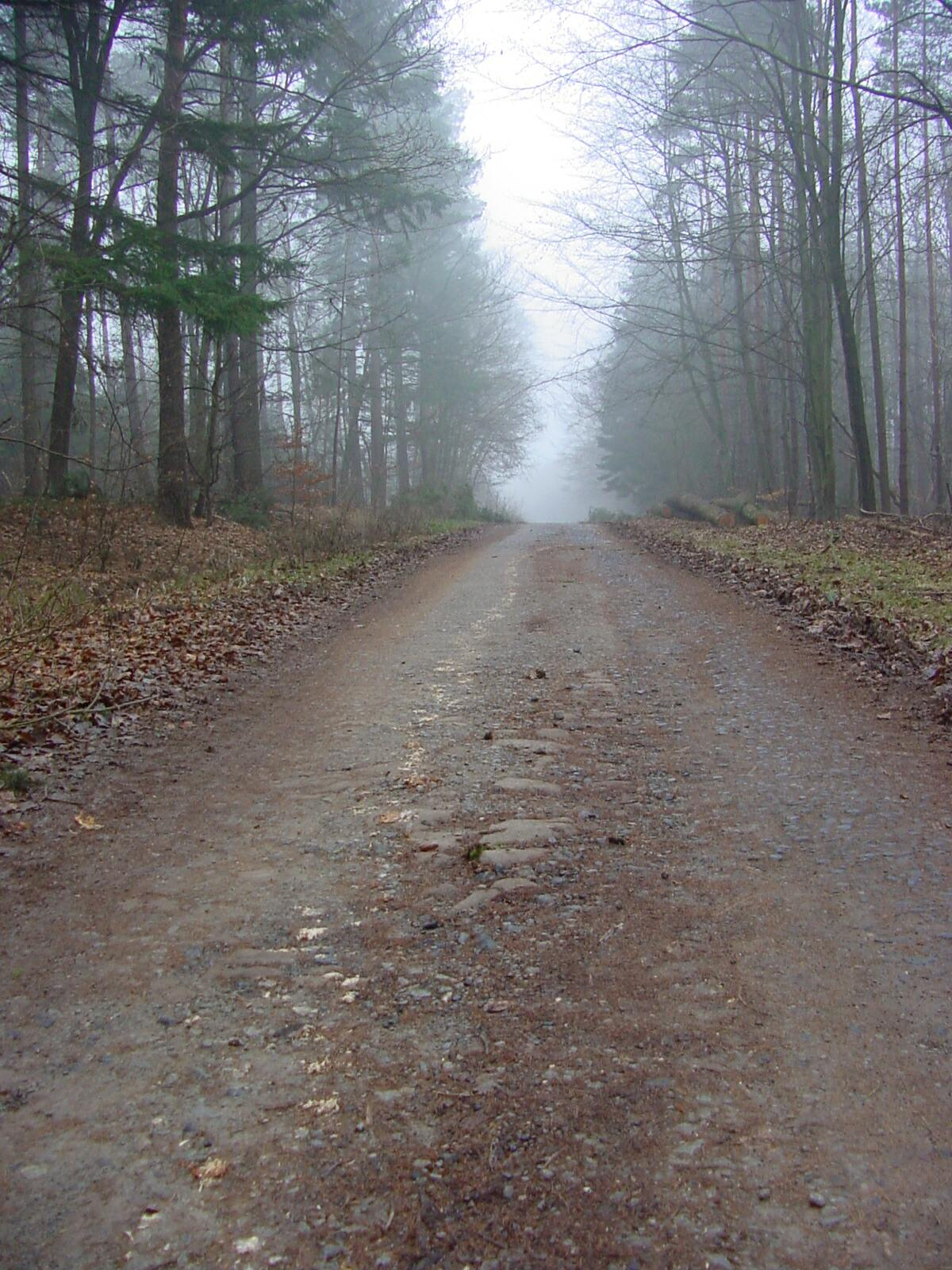
Via Regia between Fulda and Neuhof in Hesse, Germany

The Via Regia (Royal Highway) is a European Cultural Route following the route of the historic road of the Middle Ages. There were many such viae regiae associated with the king in the medieval Holy Roman Empire.

== History ==
=== Origins ===
The Via Regia ran west–east through the centre of the Holy Roman Empire, from the Rhine at Mainz-Kastel (Elisabethenstraße) to Frankfurt am Main, trade city and site of the election of the King of the Romans, continuing along Hanau, the Kaiserpfalz at Gelnhausen, the towns of Steinau an der Straße, Neuhof, Fulda and Eisenach to Erfurt, a centre of woad production. It ran further eastwards to Eckartsberga, crossing the Saale river between Bad Kösen and Naumburg and reached Leipzig, another trade city, via Ranstädter Steinweg. The eastern part continued through Upper Lusatia (Via Regia Lusatiae Superioris) along Großenhain, Königsbrück, Kamenz, Bautzen and Görlitz to Wrocław in Silesia with further connection to Kraków in Poland.

=== Medieval period ===
The road was first mentioned as strata regia in a document issued by Margrave Henry III of Meissen in 1252, while its origins date back to the 8th and 9th centuries. After the downfall of the Imperial power in Central Germany in favour of the Saxon House of Wettin following the 1307 Battle of Lucka, the road lost its royal status and from the 14th century this route could no longer really be spoken of as a "Via Regia".

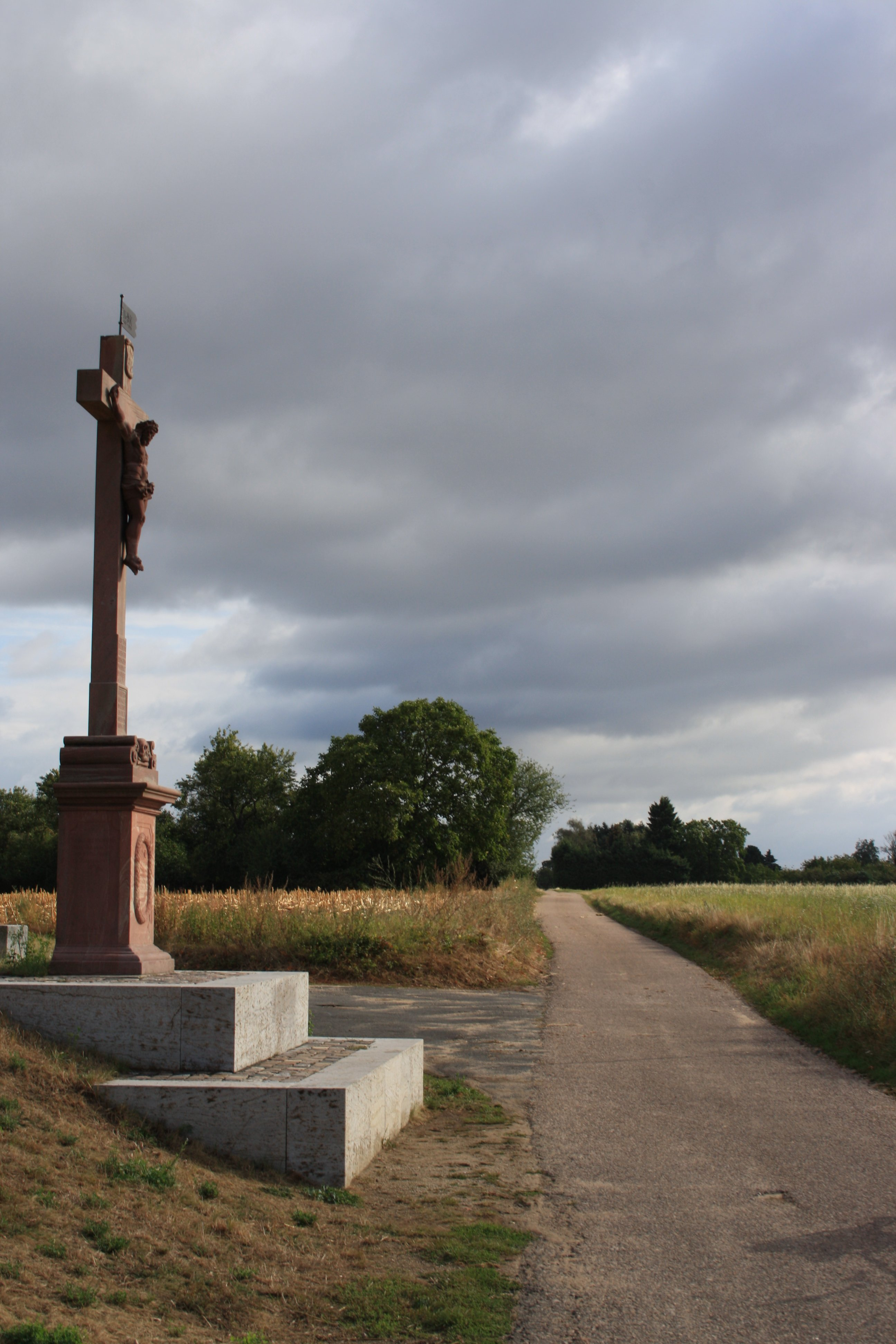
Elisabethenstraße at Mainz-Kastel

Nevertheless, the important section of the road between Frankfurt and Leipzig continued to exist under the name Hohe Straße ("High Road"). It remained under sovereign control of e.g. the Bohemian Crown in Upper Lusatia, the Saxon electors, the Abbey of Fulda, and the Archbishopric of Mainz and was chartered through tolling. Also the branch-off from Frankfurt am Main to Cologne via Wetzlar was called Hohe Straße.

The road had a large economic significance for interregional trade and bartering. From the west came Flemish blankets, from the east wood, pelts, wax and honey, and the middle section controlled the German indigo (Isatis tinctoria) of the Thuringian Basin as well as the mining products of the Saxon Ore Mountains. The High Road also provided the direct route between the largest German trade fairs of Frankfurt and Leipzig.

Pilgrims who took part in the Aachen Cathedral shrine pilgrimage used the road in large numbers. Thereto they turned off the trunk road at Eisenach along the "Long Hesse" road to Marburg and Cologne. Testimonies of the pilgrimage to Santiago de Compostela are known from Großenhain, Leipzig, Erfurt, Gotha, Vacha, Fulda, Frankfurt am Main and Mainz.

The road was repeatedly used by armies. Some large battles came to pass in its catchment area (e.g. Breitenfeld 1631, Lützen 1632, Rossbach 1757, Hochkirch 1758, and Jena-Auerstedt 1806 as well as the Battles of Bautzen, Lützen (Großgörschen) and Leipzig in 1813).

=== 19th century to present day ===
After the final defeat of Napoleon, the significance of the road declined, since, as a result of the reduction of the Kingdom of Saxony by large parts of its Lusatian territories at the Congress of Vienna, the toll on behalf of Leipzig was no longer continued.

Parts of the historic Via Regia route are today marked by major national roads: between Eisenach and Erfurt by the Bundesstraße 7 (B7); between Eckartsberga and Leipzig by the B87; and between Leipzig and Görlitz by the Bundesstraße 6 (B6) and eastwards to Kraków by the Polish national road 94. In Hanau the Birkenhainer Strasse branches off the Via Regia crossing the Spessart mountain range towards Gemünden am Main in Franconia, also as a high road.

== Tourism ==
The Council of Europe awarded the Via Regia the title of Major Cultural Route of the "Council of Europe” in 2005. According to the Council of Europe, it "is the name of the oldest and longest road link between the East and the West of Europe. The route has existed for more than 2,000 years and connects 8 European countries through a length of 4,500 km."

== See also ==
- El Camino Real (disambiguation)
- Dere Street, Scotland's Via Regia
- Roman roads

== Literature ==
- Ludwig Steinfeld: Chronik einer Straße. Die alte Straße von Frankfurt nach Leipzig; Geschichte, Ereignisse, Reiseberichte. Geiger-Verlag, Horb am Neckar 1994, ISBN 3-89264-360-1
