= King's Road (Finland) =

Old mailing route in Northern Europe dating back to the 14th century

Map illustrating how the current highway Kehä III ('Ring III') around Helsinki was built to follow the path of the medieval Kuninkaantie ('King's road') that used to connect the cities of Turku and St. Petersburg, used by Swedish kings from the 14th century. The background map illustrates the area during the years 1958–1962, before the construction of the Kehä III after 2012. part of Kehä III, opened for traffic in 2015

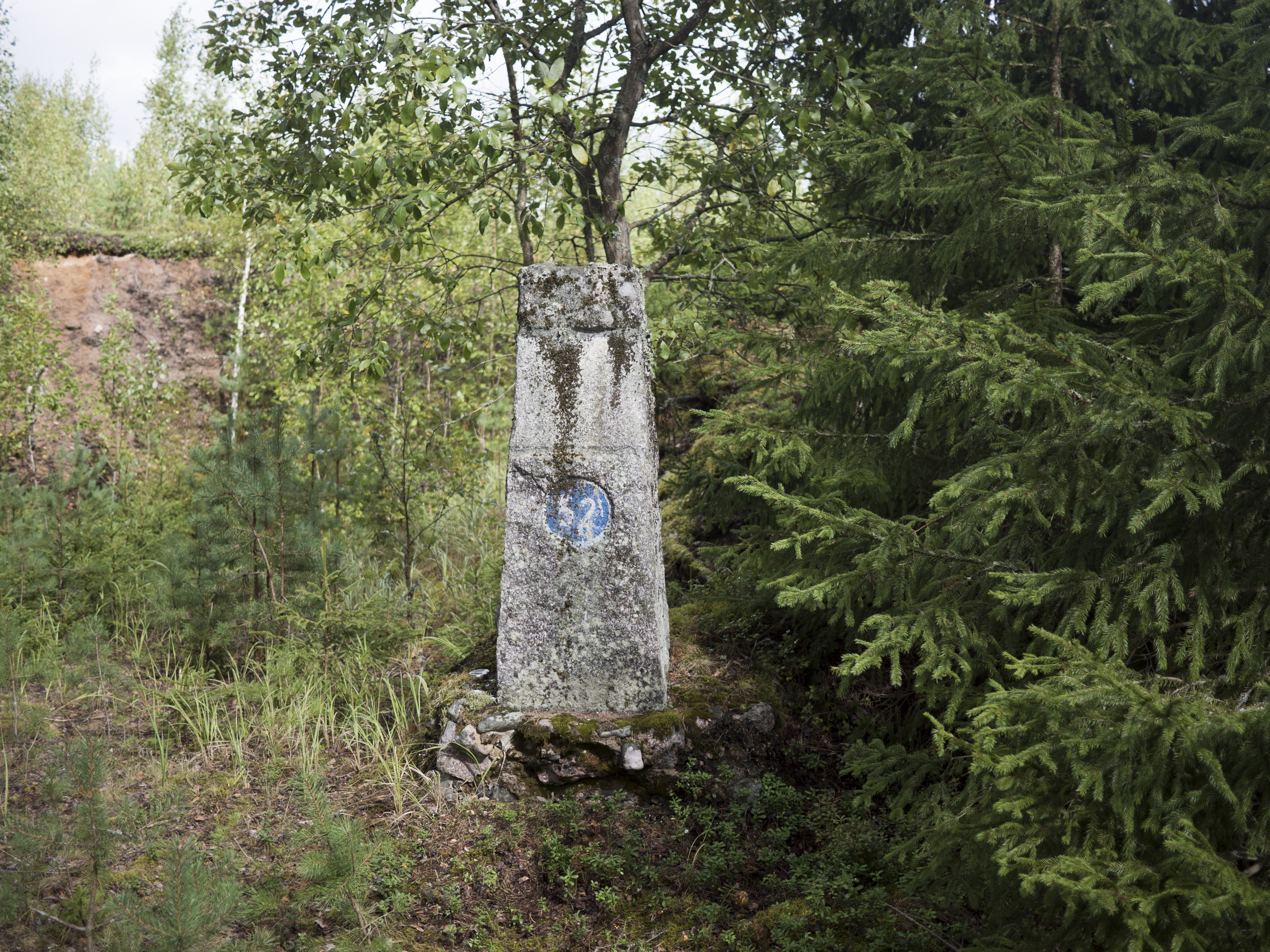
An old road sign of the King's Road between Perniö and Ekenäs.

King's Road (Finnish: Kuninkaantie, Swedish: Kungsvägen) is an old mailing route in Northern Europe dating back to the 14th century, starting from Bergen in Norway on the Atlantic coast, passing through the capitals of Norway and Sweden (Oslo and Stockholm) crossing the sea through the Åland archipelago to Turku in SW Finland and ending up in Vyborg in Russia.

The modern tourist route "King's Road" is extended to St. Petersburg.

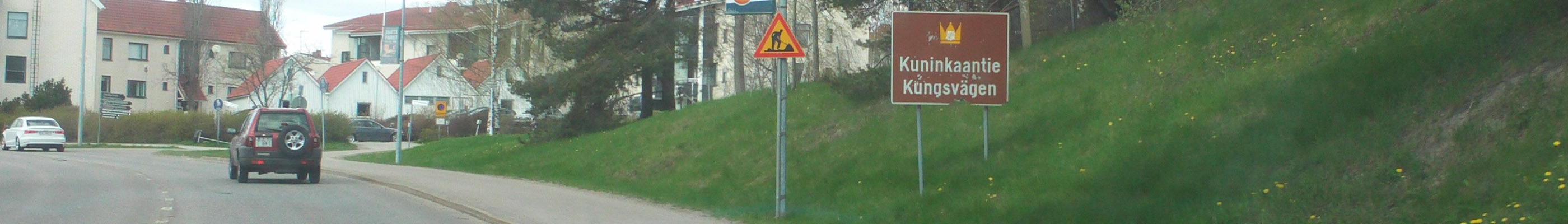
King's Road (Finland)

== See also ==
- King's Road (disambiguation) for other King's Roads
