= Ringo Starr discography =

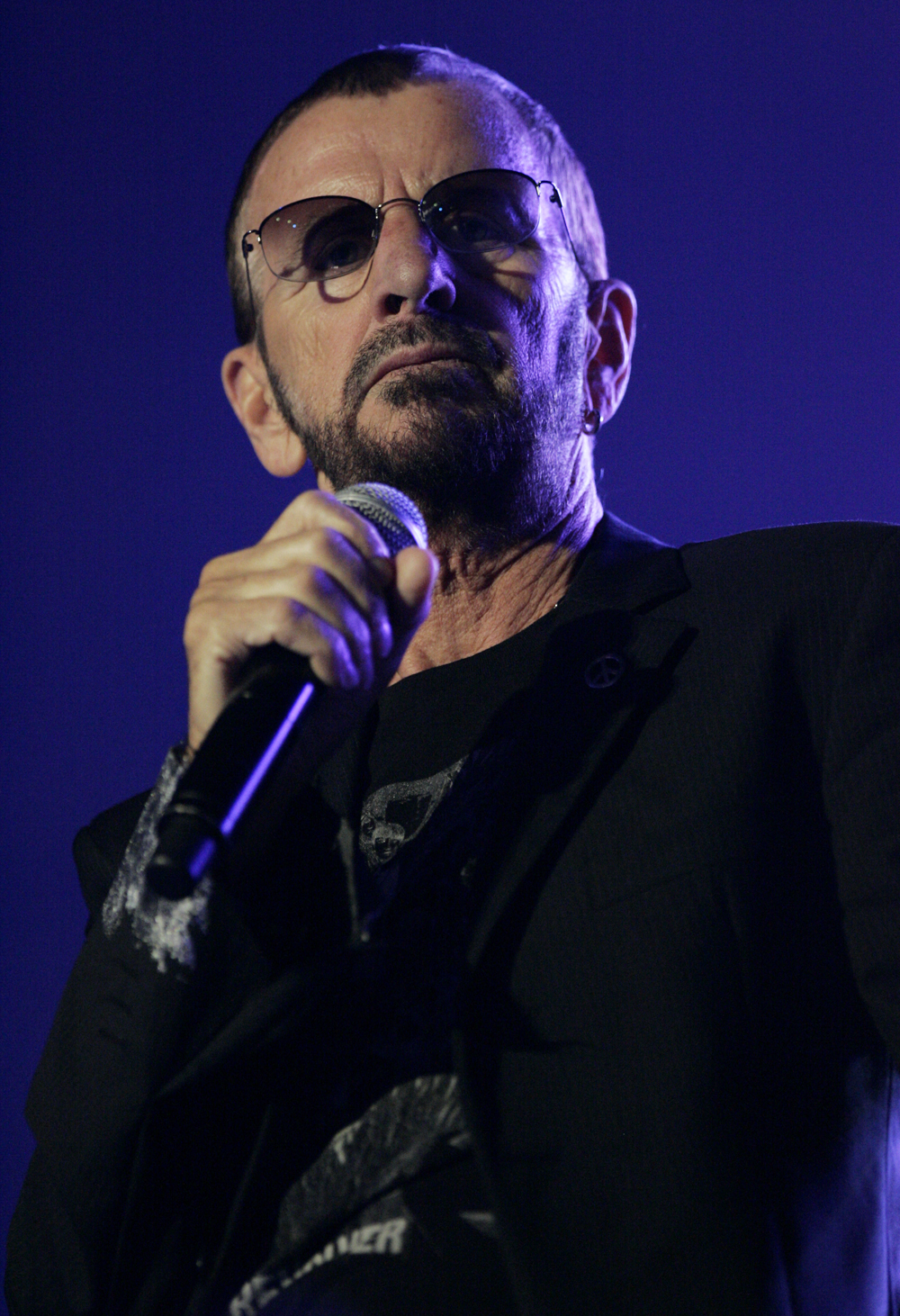
- Ringo Starr in 2013
- Studio albums: 22
- Extended plays: 6
- Live albums: 10
- Compilation albums: 8
- Singles: 64
- Video albums: 12
- Music videos: 36
- Other albums: 1
- Guest appearances: 32

English musician Ringo Starr has released 22 studio albums, 10 live albums, 8 compilation albums, 6 EPs, 64 singles, 12 video albums and 36 music videos. Starr achieved international fame as a member of British rock band the Beatles.

After the band's break-up in 1970, Starr released several successful singles including the US top-ten hit "It Don't Come Easy", and number ones "Photograph" and "You're Sixteen". His most successful UK single was "Back Off Boogaloo", which peaked at number two. He achieved commercial and critical success with his 1973 album Ringo, which was a top-ten release in both the UK and the US.

Along with the other Beatles, he spent the first half of the 1970s on Apple Records, the label created by the band for themselves. Starr moved to Atlantic Records after his contract with EMI expired and his career diminished in commercial impact, even though he continued to record and eventually tour with his All-Starr Band in 1989.

== Albums ==
=== Studio albums ===
List of studio albums
Title	Album details	Peak chart positions										Sales	Certifications (sales thresholds)
Title	Album details	UK	AUS	AUT	CAN	GER	JPN	NL	NOR	SWE	US	Sales	Certifications (sales thresholds)
Sentimental Journey	Released: 27 March 1970 (UK) 24 April 1970 (US); Label: Apple; Format: LP, reel-to-reel, 8-track, cassette, CD, DL	7	15	—	42	—	59	—	66	—	22	US: 500,000	
Beaucoups of Blues	Released: 25 September 1970 (UK) 28 September 1970 (US); Label: Apple; Format: LP, reel-to-reel, 8-track, cassette, CD, DL	—	33	—	34	—	—	—	—	—	65^{[A]}		
Ringo	Released: 2 November 1973 (US) 9 November 1973 (UK); Label: Apple; Format: LP, 8-track, cassette, CD, DL	7	2	—	1	28	10	7	1	2	2		UK: Gold; US: Platinum
Goodnight Vienna	Released: 15 November 1974 (UK) 18 November 1974 (US); Label: Apple; Format: LP, 8-track, cassette, CD, DL	30	11	8	12	39	53	—	15	—	8		UK: Silver; US: Gold
Ringo's Rotogravure	Released: 17 September 1976 (UK) 27 September 1976 (US); Label: Polydor (UK), Atlantic (US); Format: LP, 8-track, cassette, CD, DL	—	19	10	35	—	18	16	14	19	28		
Ringo the 4th	Released: 20 September 1977 (UK) 30 September 1977 (US); Label: Polydor (UK), Atlantic (US); Format: LP, 8-track, cassette, CD, DL	—	65	—	94	—	71	—	—	—	162		
Bad Boy	Released: 21 April 1978 (UK) 16 June 1978 (US); Label: Polydor (UK), Portrait (US); Format: LP, 8-track, cassette, CD, DL	—	98	—	—	—	—	—	—	—	129		
Stop and Smell the Roses	Released: 27 October 1981 (US) 20 November 1981 (UK); Label: Boardwalk (US), RCA (UK); Format: LP, 8-track, cassette, CD, DL	—	—	13	—	—	—	—	—	—	98		
Old Wave	Released: 16 June 1983 (Germany) 24 June 1983 (Canada); Label: Bellaphon (Germany), RCA (Canada); Format: LP, cassette, CD, DL	—	—	—	—	—	—	—	—	—	—		
Time Takes Time	Released: 22 May 1992 (US) 29 June 1992 (UK); Label: Private Music; Format: LP, cassette, CD, DL	—	—	19	—	—	—	—	—	34	—		
Vertical Man	Released: 16 June 1998 (US) 3 August 1998 (UK); Label: Mercury; Format: Cassette, CD, DL	85	90	—	—	59	—	—	—	—	61	UK: 2,000	
I Wanna Be Santa Claus	Released: 19 October 1999; Label: Mercury; Format: Cassette, CD, DL	—	—	—	—	—	—	—	—	—	—		
Ringo Rama	Released: 25 March 2003; Label: Koch; Format: Cassette, CD, DL	—	—	—	—	—	—	—	—	—	113^{[B]}		
Choose Love	Released: 7 June 2005 (US) 25 July 2005 (UK); Label: Koch (US), CNR (UK); Format: CD, DL	—	—	—	—	—	—	—	—	—	—^{[B]}		
Liverpool 8	Released: 14 January 2008; Label: Capitol; Format: CD, USB wristband, DL	91	—	71	—	94	207	—	—	53	94^{[C]}	US: 31,000	
Y Not	Released: 12 January 2010; Label: Hip-O, UME; Format: CD, DL, LP	—	—	—	—	75	190	—	—	—	58^{[D]}		
Ringo 2012	Release: 30 January 2012 (Internationally) 31 January 2012 (US); Label: Hip-O, UME; Format: CD, DL, LP	181	—	75	—	69	110	—	—	—	80^{[D]}	UK: 752; US: 19,000	
Postcards from Paradise	Release: 31 March 2015; Label: UME; Format: CD, DL, LP	157	—	—	—	—	83	95	—	—	99		
Give More Love	Release: 15 September 2017; Label: UME; Format: CD, DL, LP	105	—	65	—	69	68	—	—	—	128		
What's My Name	Release: 25 October 2019; Label: UME; Format: CD, DL, LP	99	—	43	—	40	49	—	—	—	127		
Look Up	Release: 10 January 2025; Label: UME; Format: CD, DL, LP	79	—	14	—	14	35	—	—	—	147		
Long Long Road	Release: 24 April 2026; Label: UME; Format: CD, DL, LP	85	—	12	—	11	—	—	—	—	—		
"—" denotes releases that did not chart.

Notes

- A Beaucoups of Blues also peaked at No. 35 on the Billboard Top Country Albums chart.
- B Ringo Rama and Choose Love also peaked at No. 6 and No. 29 respectively on the Billboard Top Independent Albums chart.
- C Liverpool 8 also peaked at No. 94 on the Billboard Top Internet Albums chart.
- D Y Not and Ringo 2012 also peaked at No. 16 and No. 21 respectively on the Billboard Top Rock Albums chart.

=== Live albums ===
==== Solo ====
Title	Album details
VH1 Storytellers	Released: 20 October 1998; Label: Mercury; Format: Cassette, CD, DL
Ringo Starr: Live at Soundstage	Released: 23 October 2007; Label: Koch; Format: CD, DL

==== Ringo Starr & His All-Starr Band ====
Title	Album details
Ringo Starr and His All-Starr Band	Released: 8 October 1990 (UK) 12 October 1990 (US); Label: EMI (UK), Rykodisc (US); Format: LP, cassette, CD
Ringo Starr and His All Starr Band Volume 2: Live from Montreux	Released: 14 September 1993; Label: Rykodisc; Format: Cassette, CD
Ringo Starr and His Third All-Starr Band Volume 1	Released: 12 August 1997; Label: Blockbuster; Format: Cassette, CD
King Biscuit Flower Hour Presents Ringo & His New All-Starr Band	Released: 6 August 2002; Label: King Biscuit; Format: CD
Tour 2003	Released: 23 March 2004; Label: Koch; Format: CD
Ringo Starr & His All Starr Band Live 2006	Released: 7 July 2008; Label: Koch; Format: CD, digital download
Live at the Greek Theatre 2008	Released: 27 July 2010; Label: Universal Music; Format: CD
Live at the Greek Theater 2019	Released: 25 November 2022; Label: Universal Music; Format: CD, digital download

=== Compilation albums ===
==== Solo ====
List of compilation albums
Title	Album details	Peak chart positions				
Title	Album details	UK	AUS	JPN	NOR	US
Blast from Your Past	Released: 25 November 1975 (US) 12 December 1975 (UK); Label: Apple; Format: LP, 8-track, cassette, CD	—	95	44	21	30
Starr Struck: Best of Ringo Starr, Vol. 2	Released: 24 February 1989; Label: Rhino; Format: LP, cassette, CD	—	—	—	—	—
Photograph: The Very Best of Ringo Starr	Released: 27 August 2007; Label: Capitol, Apple; Format: CD, digital download	26	—	84	—	130
Ringo 5.1: The Surround Sound Collection	Released: 24 March 2008; Label: Koch; Format: CD, DL (Note: Digital download version for "Stereo Masters")	—	—	—	—	—
Icon	Released: 9 September 2014; Label: Capitol, Apple; Format: CD	—	—	—	—	—
"—" denotes releases that did not chart.

==== Ringo Starr & His All-Starr Band ====
List of compilation albums
Title	Album details
The Anthology... So Far	Released: 5 February 2001 (UK) 24 July 2001 (US); Label: Eagle (UK), Koch (US); Format: CD
Extended Versions	Released: 1 April 2003; Label: BMG; Format: CD
Ringo Starr and Friends	Released: 15 August 2006; Label: Disky; Format: CD

=== Other albums ===
List of other albums
Title	Album details
Scouse the Mouse	Released: 9 December 1977; Label: Polydor; Format: LP, 8-track, cassette, CD

== Extended plays ==
Title	EP details
4-Starr Collection	Released: 1995; Label: Rykodisc; Format: Promo CD
Zoom In	Released: 19 March 2021; Label: UME; Format: CD, digital download, streaming, vinyl, cassette
Change the World	Released: 24 September 2021; Label: UME; Format: CD, digital download, streaming, vinyl, cassette
EP3	Released: 16 September 2022; Label: UME; Format: CD, digital download, streaming, vinyl, cassette
Rewind Forward	Released: 13 October 2023; Label: Roccabella; Format: CD, digital download, streaming, vinyl, cassette
Crooked Boy	Released: 26 April 2024; Label: Universal; Format: CD, digital download, streaming, vinyl

== Singles ==
List of singles
Titles (A-side, B-side) Both sides from same album except where indicated	Year	Peak chart positions													Certifications	Album
Titles (A-side, B-side) Both sides from same album except where indicated	Year	UK	AUS	BEL	CAN	CAN AC	GER	JPN	NL	NOR	SWI	US	US AC	NZ	Certifications	Album
"Beaucoups of Blues" b/w "Coochy Coochy" (Non-album track)	1970	—	66	—	35	—	43	—	—	—	—	87	—	—		Beaucoups of Blues
"It Don't Come Easy" b/w "Early 1970"	1971	4	3	9	1	—	5	30	7	3	5	4	24	7	US: Gold	Non-album single
"Back Off Boogaloo" b/w "Blindman"	1972	2	14	23	2	—	12	58	7	—	8	9	—	19		Non-album single
"Photograph" b/w "Down and Out" (Non-album track)	1973	8	1	8	1	3	5	55	4	4	6	1	3	1	US: Gold	Ringo
"You're Sixteen" b/w "Devil Woman"	1973	4	6	10	2	13	19	74	6	9	—	1	2	1	UK: Silver; US: Gold	Ringo
"Oh My My" b/w "Step Lightly"	1974	—	62	30	3	—	34	—	18	—	—	5	24	17		Ringo
"Only You (And You Alone)" b/w "Call Me"	1974	28	45	29	17	1	28	79	—	—	—	6	1	—		Goodnight Vienna
"No No Song"	1975	—	—	—	1	—	—	—	—	—	—	3	—	—		Goodnight Vienna
"Snookeroo"	1975	51	—	—	—	—	—	—	—	—	—	—	—	—		Goodnight Vienna
"It's All Down to Goodnight Vienna" b/w "Oo-Wee"	1975	—	—	—	13	—	—	—	—	—	—	31	—	—		Goodnight Vienna
"A Dose of Rock 'n' Roll" b/w "Cryin'"	1976	—	37	—	20	43	42	—	—	—	—	26	44	—		Ringo's Rotogravure
"Hey! Baby" b/w "Lady Gaye"	1976	—	—	—	66	—	—	—	—	—	—	74	—	—		Ringo's Rotogravure
"Las Brisas" b/w "Cryin'"	1976	—	—	—	—	—	—	—	—	—	—	—	—	—		Ringo's Rotogravure
"You Don't Know Me at All" b/w "Cryin'"	1976	—	—	—	—	—	—	—	24	—	—	—	—	—		Ringo's Rotogravure
"Wings" b/w "Just a Dream" (Non-album track)	1977	—	—	—	—	—	—	—	—	—	—	119	—	—	US: Cashbox	Ringo the 4th
"Drowning in the Sea of Love" b/w "Just a Dream" (Non-album track)	1977	—	—	—	—	—	—	—	—	—	—	—	—	—		Ringo the 4th
"Sneaking Sally Through the Alley" b/w "Tango All Night"	1977	—	—	—	—	—	—	—	—	—	—	—	—	—		Ringo the 4th
"Tango All Night" b/w "It's No Secret"	1977	—	—	—	—	—	—	—	—	—	—	—	—	—		Ringo the 4th
"Lipstick Traces (On a Cigarette)" b/w "Old Time Relovin'"	1978	—	—	—	—	—	—	—	—	—	—	—	—	—		Bad Boy
"Heart on My Sleeve" b/w "Who Needs a Heart"	1978	—	—	—	—	—	—	—	—	—	—	—	—	—		Bad Boy
"Tonight" b/w "Heart on My Sleeve"	1978	—	—	—	—	—	—	—	—	—	—	—	—	—		Bad Boy
"Wrack My Brain" b/w "Drumming Is My Madness"; "Back Off Bugaloo" (Ecuador)	1981	—	—	32	—	—	—	—	—	—	10	38	—	—		Stop and Smell the Roses
"Private Property" b/w "Stop and Take the Time to Smell the Roses"	1982	—	—	—	—	—	—	—	—	—	—	—	—	—		Stop and Smell the Roses
"In My Car" b/w "As Far as We Can Go"	1983	—	—	—	—	—	—	—	—	—	—	—	—	—		Old Wave
"Act Naturally" (Buck Owens and Ringo Starr)	1989	—	—	—	—	—	—	—	—	—	—	—^{[E]}	—	—		Act Naturally (Buck Owens)
"It Don't Come Easy" (Live) (Ringo Starr and His All-Starr Band)	1990	—	—	—	—	—	—	—	—	—	—	—	—	—		Ringo Starr and His All-Starr Band
"Weight of the World" b/w "After All These Years"	1992	74	142	—	61	—	51	—	—	—	21	—	—	—		Time Takes Time
"Don't Go Where the Road Don't Go" b/w "Don't Know a Thing About Love"	1992	—	—	—	—	—	—	—	—	—	—	—	—	—		Time Takes Time
"La De Da" b/w "Everyday" (Non-album track)	1998	—	—	—	—	—	—	—	—	—	—	—	—	—		Vertical Man
"Never Without You" b/w "Instant Amnesia"	2003	—	—	—	—	—	—	—	—	—	—	—	—	—		Ringo Rama
"Tears in Heaven" (Save the Children a.k.a. Mary J. Blige, Andrea Bocelli, Phil Collins, Robert Downey, Jr., Josh Groban, Elton John, Katie Melua, Kelly Osbourne, Ozzy Osbourne, Pink, Gavin Rossdale, Ringo Starr, Gwen Stefani, Steven Tyler, and Velvet Revolver)	2005	—	—	—	—	—	—	—	—	—	—	—	—	—		Hurricane Relief: Come Together Now (various artists)
"Liverpool 8" b/w "For Love"	2007	99	—	—	—	—	—	—	—	—	—	—	—	—		Liverpool 8
"The Official BBC Children in Need Medley" (as Thomas the Tank Engine, part of Peter Kay's Animated All Star Band) "The Unofficial BBC Children in Need Medley"	2009	1	—	—	—	—	—	—	—	—	—	—	—	—		Non-album CD single
"Walk with You" (with Paul McCartney)	2009	—	—	—	—	—	—	—	—	—	—	—	—	—		Y Not
"Wings"	2012	—	—	—	—	—	—	—	—	—	—	—	—	—		Ringo 2012
"Postcards from Paradise"	2015	—	—	—	—	—	—	—	—	—	—	—	—	—		Postcards from Paradise
"Children of the Revolution (Born to Boogie Version)" b/w "Tutti Frutti" (Marc Bolan & T. Rex feat. Elton John and Ringo Starr)	2016	—	—	—	—	—	—	—	—	—	—	—	—	—		Born to Boogie: The Soundtrack Album (Marc Bolan & T. Rex)
"Now the Time Has Come" (featuring Billy Valentine, Casey McPherson, Christian Collins, Colin Hay, James Maslow, Kirsten Collins, Maddi Jane, Richard Page and Wesley Stromberg)	2017	—	—	—	—	—	—	—	—	—	—	—	—	—		Non-album single
"Give More Love"	2017	—	—	—	—	—	—	—	—	—	—	—	—	—		Give More Love
"We're on the Road Again"	2017	—	—	—	—	—	—	—	—	—	—	—	—	—		Give More Love
"So Wrong for So Long"	2017	—	—	—	—	—	—	—	—	—	—	—	—	—		Give More Love
"Standing Still"	2017	—	—	—	—	—	—	—	—	—	—	—	—	—		Give More Love
"What's My Name"	2019	—	—	—	—	—	—	—	—	—	—	—	—	—		What's My Name
"Grow Old with Me"	2019	—	—	—	—	—	—	—	—	—	—	—	—	—		What's My Name
"Here's to the Nights" (featuring Paul McCartney, Finneas, Dave Grohl, Sheryl Crow, Lenny Kravitz, Steve Lukather, Joe Walsh and Chris Stapleton)	2020	—	—	85	—	—	—	—	—	—	—	—	—	—		Zoom In
"Zoom In Zoom Out"	2021	—	—	—	—	—	—	—	—	—	—	—	—	—		Zoom In
"World Go Round"	2022	—	—	—	—	—	—	—	—	—	—	—	—	—		EP3
"Everyone and Everything"	2022	—	—	—	—	—	—	—	—	—	—	—	—	—		EP3
"Rewind Forward"	2023	—	—	—	—	—	—	—	—	—	—	—	—	—		Rewind Forward
"February Sky" b/w "Gonna Need Someone"	2024	—	—	—	—	—	—	—	—	—	—	—	—	—		Crooked Boy
"Crooked Boy"	2024	—	—	—	—	—	—	—	—	—	—	—	—	—		Crooked Boy
"Time on My Hands"	2024	—	—	—	—	—	—	—	—	—	—	—	—	—		Look Up
"Thankful"	2024	—	—	—	—	—	—	—	—	—	—	—	—	—		Look Up
"Look Up"	2025	—	—	—	—	—	—	—	—	—	—	—	—	—		Look Up
"It's Been Too Long"	2026	—	—	—	—	—	—	—	—	—	—	—	—	—		Long Long Road
"Choose Love"	2026	—	—	—	—	—	—	—	—	—	—	—	—	—		Long Long Road
"—" denotes releases that did not chart or weren't released in that country.

Notes

- E "Act Naturally" also peaked at No. 27 on the Billboard Hot Country Songs and at No. 50 on the Canadian Country Songs chart.

=== Promo singles ===
Year	Single	Album
1991	"You Never Know"	Curly Sue: Music from the Motion Picture
1998	"King of Broken Hearts"	Vertical Man
1998	"One"	Vertical Man
1999	"Come on Christmas, Christmas Come On"	I Wanna Be Santa Claus
2003	"Imagine Me There"	Ringo Rama
2005	"Fading in Fading Out"	Choose Love
2008	"It's Love"	Non-album singles
2014	"I Wish I Was a Powerpuff Girl"	Non-album singles

== Collaborations and other appearances ==
=== Studio ===
Year	Title	Album
1986	"You Know It Makes Sense" "Naughty Atom Bomb" (with John Cleese and Bill Oddie)	The Anti-Heroin Project: It's a Live-In World
1988	"When You Wish upon a Star"	Stay Awake: Various Interpretations of Music from Vintage Disney Films
1991	"You Never Know"	Curly Sue: Music from the Motion Picture
1995	"Lay Down Your Arms" (Ringo Starr and Stevie Nicks)	For the Love of Harry: Everybody Sings Nilsson
2011	"Think It Over" (later included on the album Ringo 2012)	Listen to Me: Buddy Holly
2018	"Hey, Would You Hold It Down?"	King of the Road: A Tribute to Roger Miller
2021	"See You Later, Alligator"	Songs from Quarantine: Vol. 2
2023	"Let It Be" (by Dolly Parton featuring Paul McCartney and Ringo Starr with special guests Peter Frampton and Mick Fleetwood)	Rockstar

=== Live ===
Year	Title	Artist	Album
1971	"It Don't Come Easy"	George Harrison & Friends	The Concert for Bangladesh
1990	"With a Little Help from My Friends" (Ringo Starr and His All-Starr Band)	Various artists	Nobody's Child: Romanian Angel Appeal
2002	"Photograph" "Honey Don't"	Various artists	Concert for George
2012	"Wings" (Ringo Starr and His All-Starr Band)	Various artists	Songs After Sandy: Friends of Red Hook for Sandy Relief
2015	"Photograph" "Boys" "With a Little Help from My Friends"	Various artists	The Lifetime of Peace & Love Tribute Concert - Benefiting the David Lynch Foundation

=== As session musician and songwriter ===
Year	Artist	Album	Comment
1968	George Harrison	Wonderwall Music	
1969	Jackie Lomax	Is This What You Want?	Plays on various tracks
1970	Howlin' Wolf	The London Howlin' Wolf Sessions	Drums on "I Ain't Superstitious"
1970	Doris Troy	Doris Troy	Drums on the album and co-wrote "Gonna Get My Baby Back" and "You Give Me Joy Joy".
1970	John Lennon	John Lennon/Plastic Ono Band	Drums on the album
1970	Yoko Ono	Yoko Ono/Plastic Ono Band	
1970	George Harrison	All Things Must Pass	Plays on various tracks
1970	Leon Russell	Leon Russell	Drums on the album
1970	Stephen Stills	Stephen Stills	Drums on "To a Flame" and "We Are Not Helpless"
1971	Radha Krishna Temple (London)	The Radha Krsna Temple	Drums on "Govinda"
1971	Yoko Ono	Fly	Drums on "Don't Worry, Kyoko"
1971	B.B. King	B.B. King in London	Drums on "Ghetto Woman", "Wet Hayshark" and "Part-Time Love"
1971	George Harrison & Friends	The Concert for Bangladesh	Drums on the album
1972	Peter Frampton	Wind of Change	Drums on "Alright" and "The Lodger"
1972	Bobby Keys	Bobby Keys	Drums
1972	Lon & Derrek Van Eaton	Brother	Drums on "Sweet Music" and "Another Thought"
1972	London Symphony Orchestra	Tommy – As Performed by the London Symphony Orchestra & Chamber Choir	Vocals on "Fiddle About" and "Tommy's Holiday Camp"
1972	Harry Nilsson	Son of Schmilsson	Drums
1972	Bobby Hatfield	Single	Drums on "Oo Wee Baby, I Love You"
1973	George Harrison	Living in the Material World	Drums on the album
1974	Harry Nilsson	Son of Dracula	Drums on "Daybreak"
1974	Harry Nilsson	Pussy Cats	Drums on the album
1974	Ravi Shankar	Shankar Family & Friends	Drums
1974	George Harrison	Dark Horse	Drums on the album
1974	Guthrie Thomas	Sittin' Crooked	Drums
1975	Keith Moon	Two Sides of the Moon	Vocals and drums on the album; plays on "Do Me Good", "Move Over Ms. L", "Naked Man", "Real Emotion", "Solid Gold", "Together" and "Together Rap"
1975	Harry Nilsson	Duit on Mon Dei	Drums
1975	Carly Simon	Playing Possum	Drums on "More and More"
1975	Stephen Stills	Stills	Drums on "As I Come of Age"
1976	Vera Lynn	Single	Tambourine on A-side "Don't You Remember When"
1976	The Manhattan Transfer	Coming Out	Drums on "S.O.S" and "Zindy Lou"
1976	Guthrie Thomas	Lies and Alibis	Composer, drums, vocals on "Band of Steel"; drums on "Good Days Are Rollin' In" and "Ramblin' Cocaine blues"
1976	Kinky Friedman	Lasso from El Paso	Vocals on "Men's Room, L.A."
1977	The Alpha Band	Spark in the Dark	Drums on "Born in Captivity" and "You Angel You"
1977	Peter Frampton	I'm in You	Drums on the album
1977	Attitudes	Good News	Drums
1978	Lonnie Donegan	Puttin' on the Style	Drums on "Ham 'N' Eggs" and "Have a Drink on Me"
1978	The Band	The Last Waltz	Drums on "I Shall Be Released"
1979	Ian McLagan	Troublemaker	Drums on "Hold On"
1980	Harry Nilsson	Flash Harry	Drums
1981	Bob Dylan	Shot of Love	Drums on "Heart of Mine"
1981	George Harrison	Somewhere in England	Drums on "All Those Years Ago"
1982	Paul McCartney	Tug of War	Drums on "Take It Away", "Ballroom Dancing" and "Wanderlust"
1983	Guthrie Thomas	Hobo Eagle Thief	
1983	Paul McCartney	Pipes of Peace	Drums on the album
1984	Paul McCartney	Give My Regards to Broad Street	Drums on the album
1985	The Beach Boys	The Beach Boys	Drums and timpani on "California Calling"
1985	Various artists	Fourth of July – A Rockin' Celebration of America	Drums on live version of "Back in the U.S.S.R."
1985	Artists United Against Apartheid	Sun City	Drums
1985	Various artists	Water soundtrack	Drums on "Freedom"
1987	George Harrison	Cloud Nine	Drums on the album
1989	Tom Petty	Full Moon Fever	Drums in the music video for "I Won't Back Down"
1991	Nils Lofgren	Silver Lining	Drums, vocals
1993	Paul Shaffer	The World's Most Dangerous Party	Appears on the song "Burning Down the House"
1994	Tom Petty	Wildflowers	Drums on "To Find a Friend"
1996	Tom Petty and the Heartbreakers	Songs and Music from "She's the One"	Drums on "Hung Up and Overdue"
1996	Carl Perkins	Go Cat Go!	"Honey Don't" (Carl Perkins and Ringo Starr)
1997	Paul McCartney	Flaming Pie	Drums and backing vocals on "Beautiful Night", drums and co-writer on "Really Love You". Also drums on non-album b-side "Looking for You" (from the "Young Boy" single).
1999	Guthrie Thomas	Ghost Towns	Credited as Performer
2000	Various artists	Steal This Movie! soundtrack	Drums on "Power to the People"
2000	John Wetton	Sinister	Composer on "Real World"
2001	Electric Light Orchestra	Zoom	Drums on "Moment in Paradise" and "Easy Money"
2002	Various artists	Concert for George	Drums on "For You Blue", "Something", "All Things Must Pass", "While My Guitar Gently Weeps", "My Sweet Lord" and "Wah-Wah"
2003	Liam Lynch	Fake Songs	Drums on "Cuz You Do" and "Try Me"
2003	Jools Holland	Jack o the Green: Small World Big Band Friends 3	"Boys"
2004	Soundtrack	50 First Dates	Vocals on "My Little Grass Shack" (with Leon Redbone)
2006	Jerry Lee Lewis	Last Man Standing	"Sweet Little Sixteen"
2006	Platinum Weird	Make Believe	Drums on "Make Believe" and "If You Believe in Love"
2006	Carl Perkins	Blue Suede Shoes: A Rockabilly Session	""Honey Don't" (Live) "Matchbox" (Live) (The latter performed by Carl Perkins, Eric Clapton and Ringo Starr)
2009	Klaus Voormann	A Sideman's Journey	Drums
2009	Mark Hudson	The Artist	Drums on "So You Are a Star"
2010	Jerry Lee Lewis	Mean Old Man	Drums, vocals
2010	Gary Wright	Connected	Drums
2011	Ben Harper	Give Till It's Gone	Drums
2012	Ray Wylie Hubbard	The Grifter's Hymnal	Cymbals, guitar, handclapping, shaker, vocals on "Coochy Coochy"
2012	Joe Walsh	Analog Man	Drums
2012	Various artists	Songs After Sandy: Friends of Red Hook for Sandy Relief	Drums on live version of Joe Walsh's "Rocky Mountain Way"
2014	Benmont Tench	You Should Be So Lucky	Tambourine
2014	Kenny Wayne Shepherd	Goin' Home	"Cut You Loose"
2014	Mark Hudson	The Hooligan	Appears on "For Love"
2017	Jon Stevens	Starlight	Drums on "One Way Street"
2017	Middleman Burr	MB	Drums on "When Ringo Joined the Band"
2017	Sheila E.	Iconic: Message 4 America	Drums on "Come Together/Revolution"
2017	Bob Dylan	The Bootleg Series Vol. 13: Trouble No More 1979–1981	Drums on "Watered-Down Love" (Shot of Love Studio Outtake Recorded May 15, 1981)
2019	Rodney Crowell	Texas	Drums on "You're Only Happy When You're Miserable"
2019	Jenny Lewis	On the Line	Drums on "Heads Gonna Roll" and "Red Bull & Hennessy"
2020	The Empty Hearts	Remember Days Like These	Drums
2020	Graham Gouldman	Modesty Forbids	Drums on "Standing Next to Me"
2020	Ray Wylie Hubbard	Co-Starring	Drums on "Bad Trick"
2021	Steve Lukather	I Found the Sun Again	Drums and tambourine on "Run to Me"
2021	Bob Dylan	The Bootleg Series Vol. 16: Springtime in New York 1980–1985	Drums on "Mystery Train" (Shot of Love Studio Outtake Recorded May 15, 1981)
2022	Alan Darby	Rolling Man	Drums and tambourine on "Deep in the Heart of Me"
2022	Colin Hay	Now and the Evermore	Drums on "Now and the Evermore"
2022	Ray Wylie Hubbard	Co-Starring Too	Drums on "Ride or Die"
2022	Eddie Vedder	Earthling	Drums on "Mrs. Mills"
2022	Edgar Winter	Brother Johnny	Drums on "Stranger"
2023	Dr. Teeth and the Electric Mayhem	The Muppets Mayhem (soundtrack)	Drums on "We Are One"
2023	Ian Hunter	Defiance Part 1	Drums on "Bed of Roses"
2023	Nils Lofgren	Mountains	Drums on "Ain't the Truth Enough", vocals on "We Better Find It"
2024	Mark Knopfler's Guitar Heroes	Going Home (Theme from Local Hero)	Drums
2024	Graham Gouldman	I Have Notes	Drums on "Couldn't Love You More"

== Videography ==
=== Video albums ===
==== Solo ====
- VH1 Storytellers - 1998

==== Ringo Starr and His All-Starr Band ====
- Ringo Starr and His All-Starr Band - 1990
- Volume 2: Live from Montreux - 1993
- Ringo Starr and His Third All-Starr Band Volume 1 - 1997
- Ringo Starr and His Fourth All-Starr Band - 1998
- The Best of Ringo Starr and His All Starr Band So Far... - 2001
- Most Famous Hits - 2003
- Tour 2003 - 2003
- Live 2006 - 2008
- Live at the Greek Theatre 2008 - 2010
- Ringo at the Ryman - 2013

==== Ringo Starr and The Roundheads ====
- Sound Stage - 2009

=== Music videos ===
Year	Title	Album
1970	"Sentimental Journey"	Sentimental Journey
1972	"It Don't Come Easy" (2 versions)	Non-album singles
1972	"Back Off Boogaloo"	Non-album singles
1973	"Photograph"	Ringo
1974	"Only You (And You Alone)"	Goodnight Vienna
1976	"You Don't Know Me at All"	Ringo's Rotogravure
1976	"Hey! Baby"	Ringo's Rotogravure
1976	"I'll Still Love You"	Ringo's Rotogravure
1977	"Drowning in the Sea of Love"	Ringo the 4th
1978	"You're Sixteen (You're Beautiful and You're Mine)"	Ringo
1978	"Tonight"	Bad Boy
1981	"Wrack My Brain"	Stop and Smell the Roses
1981	"Private Property"	Stop and Smell the Roses
1981	"Stop and Take Time to Smell the Roses"	Stop and Smell the Roses
1989	"Act Naturally" (with Buck Owens)	Act Naturally
1992	"Weight of the World"	Time Takes Time
1992	"Don't Go Where the Road Don't Go"	Time Takes Time
1998	"La De Da"	Vertical Man
2003	"Never Without You"	Ringo Rama
2008	"Liverpool 8"	Liverpool 8
2012	"Wings"	Ringo 2012
2014	"I Wish I Was a Powerpuff Girl"	Non-album single
2015	"Postcards from Paradise"	Postcards from Paradise
2017	"Give More Love"	Give More Love
2019	"What's My Name"	What's My Name
2020	"Here's to the Nights"	Zoom In
2021	"Zoom In Zoom Out"	Zoom In
2021	"Let's Change the World"	Change the World
2021	"Rock Around the Clock"	Change the World
2022	"World Go Round"	EP3
2022	"Everyone and Everything"	EP3
2024	"Gonna Need Someone"	Crooked Boy
2024	"Crooked Boy"	Crooked Boy
2025	"Look Up"	Look Up
2026	"Long Long Road"	Long Long Road

== See also ==
- The Beatles albums discography
- The Beatles singles discography
- List of songs recorded by Ringo Starr
