= The Anthology... So Far =

Live album and compilation album by Ringo Starr & His All-Starr Band
- Released: 5 February 2001 (UK); 24 July 2001 (US)
- Recorded: 3 September 1989 – 29 June 2000
- Genre: Rock
- Length: 211:51
- Label: Eagle (UK); Koch (US)
- Producer: Ringo Starr; David Fishof

Ringo Starr chronology
I Wanna Be Santa Claus (1999)	The Anthology... So Far (2001)	King Biscuit Flower Hour Presents Ringo & His New All-Starr Band (2002)

Professional ratings
Review scores
Source	Rating
AllMusic	4/5 stars
Encyclopedia of Popular Music	3/5 stars
Record Collector	3/5 stars
The Rolling Stone Album Guide	2/5 stars

The Anthology... So Far is a triple live compilation album by English rock musician Ringo Starr and his All Starr Band. It was released in the United Kingdom on 5 February 2001 by Eagle Records (Note: UK Eagle EEECD011) and on 24 July in the United States by Koch Records. The album includes material from 1990's Ringo Starr and His All-Starr Band, 1993's Ringo Starr and His All Starr Band Volume 2: Live from Montreux and 1997's Ringo Starr and His Third All-Starr Band Volume 1, along with previously unreleased live recordings from 1995, 1997 and 2000.

The live anthology includes songs performed by Starr's bandmates from the various line-ups of the All-Starr tours between 1989 and 2000. Among these artists are Randy Bachman, Gary Brooker, Jack Bruce, Eric Carmen, Felix Cavaliere, Clarence Clemons, Burton Cummings, Rick Danko, Dr. John, Dave Edmunds, John Entwistle, Mark Farner, Peter Frampton, Levon Helm, Jim Keltner, Simon Kirke, Nils Lofgren, Billy Preston, Todd Rundgren, Timothy B. Schmit and Joe Walsh.

== Track listing ==
Disc 1
No.	Title	Performer	Length
1.	"It Don't Come Easy" (Richard Starkey)	Ringo Starr	3:15
2.	"The No–No Song" (Hoyt Axton/David Jackson)	Ringo Starr	3:31
3.	"Iko Iko" (Rosa Lee Hawkins/Barbara Ann Hawkins/Joan Marie Johnson/James Crawford)	Dr. John	6:09
4.	"The Weight" (Robbie Robertson)	Levon Helm	5:58
5.	"Shine Silently" (Nils Lofgren/Dick Wagner)	Nils Lofgren	6:46
6.	"Honey Don't" (Carl Perkins)	Ringo Starr	2:44
7.	"Quarter to Three" (Frank Guida/Eugene Barge/Joseph Royster/Gary Anderson)	Clarence Clemons	3:54
8.	"Raining in My Heart" (Buddy Holly)	Rick Danko	5:20
9.	"Will It Go Round in Circles" (Billy Preston)	Billy Preston	4:22
10.	"Life in the Fast Lane" (Joe Walsh/Glenn Frey/Don Henley)	Joe Walsh	6:47
11.	"Desperado" (Don Henley/Glenn Frey)	Joe Walsh	2:59
12.	"Norwegian Wood" (Lennon–McCartney)	Peter Frampton	2:54
13.	"Walking Nerve" (Nils Lofgren)	Nils Lofgren	4:28
14.	"Boris the Spider" (John Entwistle)	John Entwistle	2:41
15.	"Some Kind of Wonderful" (John Ellison, only found on the US release. UK version only has 16 tracks on disc 1.)	Mark Farner	4:53
16.	"You're Sixteen" (Richard Sherman/Bob Sherman)	Ringo Starr	3:15
17.	"Photograph" (Starkey/George Harrison)	Ringo Starr	4:22

Disc 2
No.	Title	Performer	Length
1.	"The Really "Serious" Introduction"	Quincy Jones	2:01
2.	"I'm the Greatest" (John Lennon)	Ringo Starr	3:30
3.	"Don't Go Where the Road Don't Go" (Richard Starkey/Johnny Warman/Gary Grainger)	Ringo Starr	4:28
4.	"I Can't Tell You Why" (Don Henley/Glenn Frey/Timothy B. Schmit)	Timothy B. Schmit	5:09
5.	"Girls Talk" (Elvis Costello)	Dave Edmunds	3:31
6.	"People Got to Be Free" (Felix Cavaliere/Eddie Brigati)	Felix Cavaliere	4:53
7.	"Groovin'" (Felix Cavaliere/Eddie Brigati)	Felix Cavaliere	4:58
8.	"Act Naturally" (Voni Morrison/Johnny Russell)	Ringo Starr	2:41
9.	"Takin' Care of Business" (Randy Bachman)	Randy Bachman	7:37
10.	"You Ain't Seen Nothin' Yet" (Randy Bachman)	Randy Bachman	3:45
11.	"In the City" (Joe Walsh/Barry DeVorzon)	Joe Walsh	4:55
12.	"Bang the Drum All Day" (Todd Rundgren)	Todd Rundgren	3:34
13.	"Black Maria" (Todd Rundgren)	Todd Rundgren	5:32
14.	"American Woman" (Burton Cummings/Randy Bachman/Gary Peterson/Michael Cale)	Burton Cummings	5:59
15.	"Weight of the World" (Brian O'Doherty/Fred Velez)	Ringo Starr	3:36
16.	"Back Off Boogaloo" (Richard Starkey)	Ringo Starr	3:19

Disc 3
No.	Title	Performer	Length
1.	"Yellow Submarine" (John Lennon/Paul McCartney)	Ringo Starr	3:31
2.	"Show Me the Way" (Peter Frampton)	Peter Frampton	5:06
3.	"Sunshine of Your Love" (Jack Bruce/Pete Brown/Eric Clapton)	Jack Bruce	7:46
4.	"I Hear You Knocking" (Pearl King/Dave Bartholomew)	Dave Edmunds	2:58
5.	"Shooting Star" (Paul Rodgers)	Simon Kirke	6:02
6.	"Boys" (Luther Dixon/Wes Farrell)	Ringo Starr	2:41
7.	"Baby I Love Your Way" (Peter Frampton)	Peter Frampton	5:12
8.	"A Salty Dog" (Gary Brooker/Keith Reid)	Gary Brooker	4:45
9.	"I Feel Free" (Jack Bruce/Pete Brown)	Jack Bruce	3:37
10.	"All Right Now" (Paul Rodgers)	Simon Kirke	4:37
11.	"I Wanna Be Your Man" (Lennon–McCartney)	Ringo Starr	3:09
12.	"A Whiter Shade of Pale" (Gary Brooker/Keith Reid)	Gary Brooker	6:20
13.	"Hungry Eyes" (John DiNicola/Franke Previte)	Eric Carmen	3:50
14.	"All by Myself" (Eric Carmen/Rachmaninoff)	Eric Carmen	7:42
15.	"With a Little Help from My Friends" (Lennon–McCartney)	Ringo Starr	5:24
