= Ringo 5.1: The Surround Sound Collection =

Compilation album by Ringo Starr
- Released: 24 March 2008
- Recorded: 2002–2005
- Genre: Rock
- Label: Koch
- Producer: Ringo Starr; Mark Hudson

Ringo Starr chronology
Liverpool 8 (2008)	Ringo 5.1: The Surround Sound Collection (2008)	Ringo Starr & His All Starr Band Live 2006 (2008)

Professional ratings
Review scores
Source	Rating
AllMusic	3/5 stars

Ringo 5.1: The Surround Sound Collection is a DVD-Audio compilation by Ringo Starr. The tracks featured are from his albums Ringo Rama and Choose Love. The album was nominated for a Grammy for Best Surround Sound.

== Track listing ==
=== Disc: 1 ===
1. "Fading in and Fading Out"
2. "Never Without You"
3. "Choose Love"
4. "Imagine Me There"
5. "Oh My Lord" – with Billy Preston
6. "Memphis in Your Mind"
7. "Give Me Back the Beat"
8. "Love First, Ask Questions Later"
9. "Don't Hang Up" – with Chrissie Hynde
10. "Eye to Eye"
11. "Some People"
12. "Elizabeth Reigns"

=== Disc: 2 ===
All songs are featured in Dolby Digital, DTS and DVD-Audio (MLP) 5.1 surround sound mixes. The tracklist is slightly different from that given on the inlay cards ("Some People" comes before "Don't Hang Up"). The DVD has an extra track, "I Really Love Her", which was previously a hidden track on Ringo Rama.

1. "Fading in and Fading Out"
2. "Never Without You" – with Eric Clapton
3. "Choose Love"
4. "Imagine Me There" – with Charlie Haden
5. "Oh My Lord" – with Billy Preston
6. "Memphis in Your Mind" – with Timothy B. Schmit
7. "Give Me Back the Beat"
8. "Love First, Ask Questions Later"
9. "Some People"
10. "Don't Hang Up" – with Chrissie Hynde
11. "Eye to Eye"
12. "Elizabeth Reigns" – with Van Dyke Parks
13. "I Really Love Her" – performed completely by Ringo
