= Time Takes Time =

- Original album artwork by Mark Ryden

Studio album by Ringo Starr
- Released: 22 May 1992
- Recorded: March–September 1991, February 1992
- Genre: Rock
- Length: 40:04
- Labels: Private Music; RCA
- Producers: Don Was; Jeff Lynne; Peter Asher; Phil Ramone

Ringo Starr chronology
Ringo Starr and His All-Starr Band (1990)	Time Takes Time (1992)	Ringo Starr and His All Starr Band Volume 2: Live from Montreux (1993)

Singles from Time Takes Time
- 1. "Weight of the World" Released: 28 April 1992 (US); 18 May 1992 (UK); 2. "Don't Go Where the Road Don't Go" Released: 21 September 1992 (Germany only)

Time Takes Time is the tenth studio album by Ringo Starr. His first studio album since 1983's Old Wave, it marked the longest gap between two of his albums to date. Released in 1992, Time Takes Time was a critically acclaimed comeback album, and featured several celebrity guests including Brian Wilson, Harry Nilsson and Electric Light Orchestra front-man Jeff Lynne.

== Background ==
In February 1987, Starr started work on his first new studio album in four years. Sessions began with producer Chips Moman in 3 Alarm Studios in Memphis, Tennessee. These sessions lasted for a few days then came to a halt before being resumed in April, with recording taking place at 3 Alarm Studios and Sun Studios. (Note: Among the total of 16 songs recorded, some include: "Shoo-Be-Doo-Be-Doo-Da-Day", "Some Kind of Wonderful", "Beat Patrol", "Ain't That a Shame", "Whiskey and Cola", and "I Can Help".) A month-long string of recording sessions were planned in August, for recording at Mayfair Recording Studios in London, before being halted shortly before recording had begun. These sessions were to have been handled by Elton John's manager, John Reid, and were intended to feature John. While on tour in July 1989 with the All-Starr Band, Starr was told that Moman was attempting to release the Memphis sessions as an album; Starr proceeded to sue Moman in August. An injunction was issued by the Fulton County Superior Courts to Starr in early January 1990, where he was to pay out costs of the sessions to Moman. It was announced at a National Association of Radio Merchandisers (NARM) convention that Starr signed a recording contract with Private Music in March 1991, who seemed to be the only label interested in him at the time.

== Recording ==
Starr had initially intended to try out four producers, and select the best to record the whole album with: '...because it's been so long for me that I didn't really know any producers I wanted to go with for the whole record. So I figured I'd try a few people.' Aligning himself with top producers Don Was, Peter Asher, Phil Ramone and Jeff Lynne, the album was recorded sporadically between March and September 1991, and finished in February 1992. Jim Horn, who plays all the saxophone parts on the album, had previously worked on Starr's Ringo (1973). The material was written predominantly by outside writers, with Starr co-writing three songs. Time Takes Time also marked Starr's first alliance with Mark Hudson, who assisted with the background vocals and arrangements on some of the Ramone-produced tracks. (Note: Starr and Hudson would later work together on Vertical Man (1998), VH1 Storytellers (1998), I Wanna Be Santa Claus (1999), and Ringo Rama (2003), among other albums.)

In April 1991, Starr recorded with fellow label artist, Taj Mahal, on his album. Lynne and Starr recorded four songs between 20 and 31 May: "Don't Go Where the Road Don't Go", "After All These Years", "Don't Be Cruel", and "Call Me". Lynne later remixed "Don't Go Where the Road Don't Go" at Ocean Way Studios. Starr contributed the song "You'll Never Know", recorded on 14 September at the tail-end of the album sessions, to the soundtrack of the film Curly Sue. "Weight of the World" was recorded in February 1992 in Los Angeles. Starr recorded "Runaways" and "All in the Name of Love", the latter written by Jerry Lynn Williams, with Ramone. With Asher, Starr recorded "Thank You for Being a Friend", written by Andrew Gold, The Posies' "Golden Blunders", and a McCartney–Starr song, "Angel in Disguise". Was' sessions were backed by a core group of musicians who he works with frequently featuring: Benmont Tench on keyboard, longtime Bonnie Raitt bassist James "Hutch" Hutchinson and Mark Goldenberg on guitar. With Was, Starr recorded 4 songs, the Diane Warren–written song "In a Heartbeat" featuring Brian Wilson on backing vocals, "What Goes Around" written by Rick Suchow and featuring Andrew Gold on backing vocals, and "Weight of the World". The latter 2 both featured Andy Sturmer & Roger Manning on backing vocals. Sturmer and Manning of Jellyfish also contributed the song "I Don't Believe You", played acoustic guitars and sang backing vocals on this Was recording basically mirroring their own version of the song.

Several tracks were left off the album. The primarily McCartney-penned song "Angel in Disguise", to which Starr added a verse, has never been released. (Note: Being interviewed by a Toronto Sun reporter on 25 October, McCartney said that 'Ringo wanted an extra verse, so I said, 'Let's write the extra verse together. Or you can just write it and we'll have co-written the song.' I understand he has written a third verse. If it's another "With A Little Help From My Friends", great, if it isn't, great!') Starr covered "Don't Be Cruel", and it was issued as the B-side of the CD single "Weight of the World" and included on the Japanese edition of the album. Another outtake, "Everybody Wins", was issued in Germany as the B-side of the "Don't Go Where the Road Don't Go" single. Three more outtakes that were never released were "Thank You for Being a Friend", the Ramone-produced "Love Is Going to Get You", (Note: Ramone commented that the song was "great [...] but it did not fit with the character of the songs he did" so far.) and the Lynne-produced "Call Me". Lynne has said that "Call Me" would never be released, which Tom Petty appears on. Although Starr had recorded and released another song entitled "Call Me" as far back as 1974, it bore no resemblance to the Lynne-produced number.

== Release ==
Starr announced the album, the lead single, "Weight of the World", and an All-Starr tour, on 28 February 1992. On 2 April, Starr held a press conference restating the information in addition to tour dates at Radio City Music Hall in New York. In the days following 3 April, Starr made television appearances and appeared on radio broadcasts to promote the album and tour. On the same day, promotional copies of "Weight of the World" were sent to radio stations in the US. Filming for a music video for "Weight of the World" began on 16 May, and finished the day after. CNN broadcast a behind-the-scenes report on making the video on 18 May. Starr and his All-Starr band appeared on the TV show Arsenio, with a performance to promote the single. The single "Weight of the World" was released on 28 April in the US, (Note: US Private Music 01005-81003-2) and on 18 May in the UK. (Note: 7": UK Private Music 115,392; CD: UK Private Music 665,392)

Time Takes Time was released in the US on 22 May, (Note: US Private Music 01005-82097-2) and in the UK on 29 June, by Private Music. (Note: UK Private Music 262 902) Starr commented that he had not 'been this happy with an album since Ringo in 1973. It's time I stretched.' However, the album failed to chart. While a planned single release on 3 July in the US of "Don't Go Where the Road Don't Go", backed with "Everyone Wins", was shelved, a CD edition of the single managed to get released in Germany on 21 September. (Note: "Everyone Wins" was mistitled as "Everybody Wins".) The 7" vinyl edition of the single was also released in Germany and had "Don't Know a Thing About Love" as the B-side, released on the same day. (Note: CD: Germany Private Music 74321 11369 2; 7" vinyl: Germany Private Music 74321 11369 7) Starr again appeared on Arsenio on 21 October, being interviewed and then performing "Don't Go Where the Road Don't Go" and "Act Naturally". Times Takes Time was released on vinyl only in Mexico, Brazil, Spain and Germany. (Note: Starr's following albums weren't released on vinyl until Y Not (2010).) Despite an All-Starr tour in 1992 to promote the album, Time Takes Time would be Starr's only release with Private Music before he was dropped from their roster.

== Reception ==
Professional ratings
Review scores
Source	Rating
AllMusic	4.5/5 stars
Encyclopedia of Popular Music	2/5 stars
The Essential Rock Discography	6/10
MusicHound	2/5
Q	2/5 stars
Rolling Stone	3/5 stars

The album received mixed reviews upon release, although one critic considered Time Takes Time to be Starr's best album since 1973's Ringo: Rolling Stone magazine wrote, "The drummer's most consistent, wide-awake album since Ringo, from 1973".

The release failed to chart in either the UK or US. Lead single "Weight of the World" managed to reach No. 74 on the UK Singles chart, and it also reached top 40 positions on the singles charts for Sweden and Switzerland. In addition, "Weight of the World" ultimately became Starr's only single to appear on the US Mainstream Rock Airplay chart, peaking at No. 43 in June 1992.

== Track listing ==
No.	Title	Writer(s)	Producer	Length
1.	"Weight of the World"	Brian O'Doherty, Fred Velez	Don Was	3:54
2.	"Don't Know a Thing About Love"	Richard Feldman, Stan Lynch	Was	3:49
3.	"Don't Go Where the Road Don't Go"	Richard Starkey, Johnny Warman, Gary Grainger	Jeff Lynne	3:20
4.	"Golden Blunders"	Jonathan Auer, Kenneth Stringfellow	Peter Asher	4:06
5.	"All in the Name of Love"	Jerry Lynn Williams	Phil Ramone	3:42
6.	"After All These Years"	Starkey, Warman	Lynne	3:10
7.	"I Don't Believe You"	Andy Sturmer, Roger Manning	Was	2:48
8.	"Runaways"	Starkey, Warman	Ramone	4:51
9.	"In a Heartbeat"	Diane Warren	Was	4:29
10.	"What Goes Around"	Rick Suchow	Was	5:50

Japanese edition bonus track
No.	Title	Writer(s)	Producer(s)	Length
11.	"Don't Be Cruel"	Otis Blackwell, Elvis Presley	Lynne	2:08

== Personnel ==
Personnel per booklet.

- Ringo Starr – lead vocals, drums, percussion
- Jeff Lynne – guitar, bass guitar, piano, keyboards, backing vocals (tracks 3 and 6)
- Mark Goldenberg – guitar (tracks 1, 2 and 9)
- Waddy Wachtel – guitar (track 4)
- Andrew Gold – acoustic guitar, guitar (solo) (track 4), backing vocals (track 4, 9 and 10)
- Roger Manning – acoustic guitar, backing vocals (track 7), backing vocals (track 1, 2, 9 and 10)
- Andy Sturmer – acoustic guitar, backing vocals (track 7), backing vocals (track 1, 2, 9 and 10)
- Michael Landau – guitar (tracks 7, 9 and 10)
- David Grissom – acoustic guitar (tracks 7 and 10)
- Michael Thompson – guitar (tracks 5 and 8)
- Jeff Baxter – guitar (tracks 5 and 8)
- Mark Hart – keyboards, [Additional Synth Guitar], backing vocals (track 5)
- Benmont Tench – keyboards (tracks 1 and 2), piano, Hammond organ (tracks 7 and 10); Hammond, harmonium (track 9)
- Robbie Buchanan – keyboards (tracks 4 and 9)
- Jeffrey Vanston – keyboards (tracks 5 and 8)
- Jamie Muhoberac – keyboards (track 9)
- James "Hutch" Hutchinson – bass guitar (tracks 1, 2, 7, 9 and 10)
- Bob Glaub – bass guitar (track 4)
- Neil Stubenhaus – bass guitar (tracks 5 and 8)
- Peter Asher – tambourine, backing vocals (track 4)
- Mark Hudson – percussion, backing vocals
- Jim Horn – saxophone (track 3)
- Suzie Katayama – cello (track 3)
- Raven Kane – backing vocals
- Rosemary Butler – backing vocals
- Valerie Carter – backing vocals
- Terri Wood – backing vocals
- Carmen Twillie – backing vocals
- Wendy Fraser – backing vocals
- Stephanie Spruill – backing vocals
- Andrea Robinson – backing vocals
- Bobbi Page – backing vocals
- Doug Fieger – backing vocals (track 2 and 9)
- Berton Averre – backing vocals
- Mark Hart – backing vocals
- Craig Copeland – backing vocals
- Naomi Star – backing vocals
- Darlene Koldenhoven – backing vocals
- Harry Nilsson – vocals (track 8)
- Kathryn Cotter – backing vocals
- Mark Warman – backing vocals
- Brian Wilson – backing vocals (track 9)
- Brian O'Doherty – backing vocals

== Charts ==
Chart (1992)	Peak position
Austrian Albums (Ö3 Austria)	19
Swedish Albums (Sverigetopplistan)	34
