= Extended Versions (Ringo Starr album) =

Live album by Ringo Starr & His All-Starr Band
- Released: 1 April 2003
- Recorded: 22 August 2001
- Genre: Rock
- Length: 47:14
- Label: BMG

Ringo Starr chronology
Ringo Rama (2003)	Extended Versions (2003)	Tour 2003 (2004)

Professional ratings
Review scores
Source	Rating
Allmusic	3/5 stars

Extended Versions is a live album by Ringo Starr & His All-Starr Band released by BMG on 1 April 2003. (Note: UK BMG Special Products 75517465252) The album features the tracks from the All-Starr Band's 2001 tour. (Tracks from the 2001 edition of the All-Starr Band also appeared on the album, King Biscuit Flower Hour Presents Ringo & His New All-Starr Band, released in 2002).

== Track listing ==
No.	Title	Writer(s)	Featured Artist	Length
1.	"Yellow Submarine"	Lennon–McCartney	Ringo Starr	2:57
2.	"Karn Evil 9 (1st Impression, Part II)"	Emerson, Lake and Palmer	Greg Lake	5:30
3.	"It Don't Come Easy"	Ringo Starr	Ringo Starr	2:56
4.	"I Still Love Rock N' Roll"	Richard Starkey, Ian Hunter	Ian Hunter	4:35
5.	"Act Naturally"	Voni Morrison, Johnny Russell	Ringo Starr	2:29
6.	"Photograph"	Richard Starkey, George Harrison	Ringo Starr	3:41
7.	"A Love Bizarre"	Prince, Sheila E.	Sheila E.	4:05
8.	"With a Little Help from My Friends"	Lennon–McCartney	Ringo Starr	4:59
9.	"Everlasting Love"	Howard Jones	Howard Jones	5:13
10.	"Glamorous Life"	Prince	Sheila E.	5:09

== Personnel ==
Ringo Starr & His All-Starr Band

- Ringo Starr – drums, percussion, vocals
- Roger Hodgson – guitars, vocals
- Ian Hunter – guitars, keyboards, vocals
- Greg Lake – bass guitar, vocals
- Howard Jones – keyboards, vocals
- Sheila E. – drums, percussion, vocals
- Mark Rivera – saxophone, flute, guitar, bass guitar, percussion, harmonica, vocals
