= Tour 2003 =

Live album by Ringo Starr and His All-Starr Band
- Released: 23 March 2004
- Recorded: 24 July 2003
- Genre: Rock
- Length: 68:14
- Label: Koch

Ringo Starr chronology
| Extended Versions (2003) | Tour 2003 (2004) | Choose Love (2005) |

Professional ratings
Review scores
| Source | Rating |
|---|---|
| AllMusic | 1.5/5 stars |
| Encyclopedia of Popular Music | 2/5 stars |
| The Essential Rock Discography | 3/10 |
| The Rolling Stone Album Guide | 2/5 stars |

Tour 2003 is a live and video album by Ringo Starr & His All-Starr Band released in 2004.

== Overview ==
After releasing Ringo Rama in 2003, Starr embarked on tour once more with his All-Starr Band and its ever-changing collective of musicians. From the previous band remained Mark Rivera, as does singing percussionist Sheila E. New to the mix are Paul Carrack of Squeeze and Mike + The Mechanics fame, Colin Hay from Australian band Men at Work and John Waite, a solo artist who also had fronted The Babys and Bad English.

The performance included on the album is from the opening night of his Ringo Starr and His All Starr Band Tour 2003: Ringo Rama tour at the Casino Rama, just outside Toronto, Ontario in Canada. Despite this, the CD booklet for Tour 2003 confusingly carries a review for a later August show in Detroit.

Having already exhausted the appearances of most of his 1960s and 1970s contemporaries, Starr's new participants clearly add a strong 1980s element to Tour 2003, giving this recording a different edge. While Starr typically performs his well-known hits from his heyday, he does venture here to include "Memphis in Your Mind" from Ringo Rama

== Reception ==
Some critics were quick to note that this live album was Starr's seventh official release of the sort in fourteen years. Tour 2003 generally received lackluster reviews upon release. The release failed to chart.

== Track listing ==
| No. | Title | Writer(s) | Featured artist | Length |
|---|---|---|---|---|
| 1. | "It Don't Come Easy" | Richard Starkey | Ringo Starr | 3:44 |
| 2. | "Honey Don't" | Carl Perkins | Ringo Starr | 2:59 |
| 3. | "Memphis In Your Mind" | Richard Starkey, Mark Hudson, Gary Burr, Steve Dudas. Dean Grakal | Ringo Starr | 4:23 |
| 4. | "How Long" | Paul Carrack | Paul Carrack | 4:45 |
| 5. | "Down Under" | Ron Strykert, Colin Hay | Colin Hay | 4:25 |
| 6. | "When I See You Smile" | Diane Warren | John Waite | 4:52 |
| 7. | "A Love Bizarre" | Pete Escovedo | Sheila E. | 4:05 |
| 8. | "Boys" | Luther Dixon, Wes Farrell | Ringo Starr | 3:04 |
| 9. | "Don't Pass Me By" | Richard Starkey | Ringo Starr | 4:02 |
| 10. | "Yellow Submarine" | Lennon–McCartney | Ringo Starr | 3:11 |
| 11. | "The Living Years" | Mike Rutherford, B.A. Robertson | Paul Carrack | 6:25 |
| 12. | "Missing You" | John Waite, Mark Leonard, Charles Sandford | John Waite | 4:18 |
| 13. | "The Glamorous Life" | Prince | Sheila E. | 4:49 |
| 14. | "I Wanna Be Your Man" | Lennon–McCartney | Ringo Starr | 3:25 |
| 15. | "Who Can It Be Now?" | Colin Hay | Colin Hay | 4:00 |
| 16. | "With a Little Help from My Friends" | Lennon–McCartney | Ringo Starr | 5:36 |

== Personnel ==
- Ringo Starr – vocals, drums, piano (instruments uncredited)
- Colin Hay – guitar, vocals
- Paul Carrack – keyboards, vocals
- John Waite – bass, vocals, guitar
- Sheila E. – drums, vocals, percussion
- Mark Rivera – saxophone, percussion, backing vocals, flute, bass, harmonica
