= Ringo Starr & His All Starr Band Live 2006 =

Live album by Ringo Starr & His All-Starr Band
- Released: 8 July 2008
- Recorded: 16 July 2006, at Mohegan Sun, Uncasville
- Venues: Mohegan Sun Arena, Uncasville
- Genre: Rock
- Length: 79:45
- Label: Koch
- Producer: Ringo Starr

Ringo Starr & His All-Starr Band chronology
Ringo 5.1: The Surround Sound Collection (2008)	Ringo Starr & His All Starr Band Live 2006 (2008)	Y Not (2010)

Ringo Starr & His All Starr Band Live 2006 is a 2008 live album by rock supergroup Ringo Starr & His All-Starr Band. Recorded during the 2006 All-Starr Tour at the Mohegan Sun Arena in Uncasville, Connecticut on 16 July 2006, the album was released by Koch Records on 8 July 2008. Led by former Beatles drummer Ringo Starr, the supergroup included Richard Marx, Billy Squier, Edgar Winter, Rod Argent, Hamish Stuart, and Sheila E. This particular tour was notable for Starr's personal and professional break with longtime collaborator, Mark Hudson, who declined to participate, inciting the split.

== Track listing ==
No.	Title	Writer(s)	Featured artist(s)	Length
1.	"Introduction: With a Little Help from My Friends / It Don't Come Easy"	Lennon–McCartney; Richard Starkey		3:57
2.	"What Goes On"	Lennon–McCartney–Starkey		3:!2
3.	"Honey Don't"	Carl Perkins		2:35
4.	"Everybody Wants You"	Squier	Billy Squier	5:20
5.	"Free Ride"	Daniel Earl Hartman	Edgar Winter	4:40
6.	"A Love Bizarre"	Prince; Sheila Escovedo	Sheila E.	4:24
7.	"Don't Mean Nothing"	Marx; Bruce Gaitsch	Richard Marx	5:09
8.	"She's Not There"	Argent	Rod Argent	4:17
9.	"Yellow Submarine"	Lennon–McCartney		3:40
10.	"Frankenstein"	Winter	Edgar Winter	8:00
11.	"Photograph"	Starkey; George Harrison		4:02
12.	"Should've Known Better"	Marx	Richard Marx	5:01
13.	"The Glamorous Life"	Prince	Sheila E.	3:02
14.	"I Wanna Be Your Man"	Lennon–McCartney		3:26
15.	"Rock Me Tonite"	Squier	Billy Squier	6:20
16.	"Hold Your Head Up"	Argent; Chris White	Rod Argent	3:52
17.	"Act Naturally" (#"" (–Voni Morrison))	Johnny Russell; Voni Morrison		3:00
18.	"With a Little Help from My Friends"	Lennon–McCartney		5:48
Total length:				79:45

== Personnel ==
- Ringo Starr – drums, vocals, executive producer
- Sheila E – drums, vocals
- Billy Squier – guitar, vocals
- Richard Marx – guitar, vocals
- Edgar Winter – keyboards, saxophone, vocals
- Rod Argent – keyboards, vocals
- Hamish Stuart – bass, vocals
