= Choose Love (album) =

Studio album by Ringo Starr
- Released: 7 June 2005
- Recorded: Mid-2004 – early 2005
- Studio: Roccabella (UK); Whatinthewhatthe? (Los Angeles); The Village Recorder (Los Angeles)
- Genre: Rock
- Length: 44:36
- Label: Koch; CNR
- Producer: Ringo Starr; Mark Hudson

Ringo Starr chronology
| Tour 2003 (2004) | Choose Love (2005) | Ringo Starr and Friends (2006) |

Singles from Choose Love
- 1. "Fading In Fading Out" Released: 2005 (promo only)

Choose Love is the fourteenth studio album by English singer-songwriter Ringo Starr. It was released on 7 June 2005 through Koch Records and CNR Records.

== Background and recording ==
Recorded throughout 2004 into 2005, using the same team that created Vertical Man (1998) and Ringo Rama (2003), Starr produced the set with longtime musical partner Mark Hudson and performed it with their studio team. The title track has a Beatles-like "Day Tripper" guitar riff with a coda similar to "The Word" and mentions the Beatles songs "The Long and Winding Road", "Tomorrow Never Knows" and "What Goes On", as well as lyric checking the Starr solo single "It Don't Come Easy". Starr's albums are known for including celebrity guests; Choose Love features Billy Preston and Chrissie Hynde.

== Release ==
Choose Love was released on 7 June 2005 in the US, (Note: US Koch KOC-CD-550) and on 25 July in the UK. There was an edition of the album that was a dual disc (CD on side, DVD on the other), with the DVD component featuring bonus features on the making of the album. (Note: US Koch KOC-CD-9919)

== Reception ==
Professional ratings
Review scores
| Source | Rating |
|---|---|
| AllMusic | 4/5 stars |
| Encyclopedia of Popular Music | 3/5 stars |
| entertainment.ie | 3/5 stars |
| The Essential Rock Discography | 5/10 |
| The Music Box | 3/5 stars |
| Star-News | (favorable) |

Choose Love failed to chart in both the UK and US, where both Vertical Man and Ringo Rama had seen commercial success. The album received strong reviews upon its release and preceded another promotional tour with Starr and his studio band, called "The Roundheads".

== Track listing ==
| No. | Title | Writer(s) | Length |
|---|---|---|---|
| 1. | "Fading In Fading Out" | Richard Starkey; Mark Hudson; Gary Burr | 3:55 |
| 2. | "Give Me Back the Beat" | Starkey; Hudson; Burr; Steve Dudas; Dean Grakal | 3:53 |
| 3. | "Oh My Lord" | Starkey; Hudson; Burr; Dudas; Grakal | 5:32 |
| 4. | "Hard to Be True" | Starkey; Hudson; Burr | 3:27 |
| 5. | "Some People" | Starkey; Hudson; Burr; Dudas; Grakal | 3:17 |
| 6. | "Wrong All the Time" | Starkey; Hudson; Burr | 3:30 |
| 7. | "Don't Hang Up" (featuring Chrissie Hynde) | Starkey; Hudson; Burr | 3:27 |
| 8. | "Choose Love" | Starkey; Hudson; Burr | 3:07 |
| 9. | "Me and You" | Starkey; Hudson; Dudas | 2:15 |
| 10. | "Satisfied" | Starkey; Hudson; Gary Nicholson | 3:19 |
| 11. | "The Turnaround" | Starkey; Hudson; Burr; Dudas; Grakal | 3:54 |
| 12. | "Free Drinks" | Starkey; Hudson; Burr; Dudas; Grakal | 4:45 |

== Personnel ==
Personnel per booklet.

Musicians

- Ringo Starr – drums, percussion, vocals, intro/outro demo tape on "Oh My Lord", organ, loop on "Free Drinks"
- Mark Hudson – bass, acoustic guitar, electric guitar, backing vocals, keyboards, sax arrangement, harmonica
- Gary Burr – acoustic guitar, electric guitar, backing vocals, bass, slide guitar
- Mark Mirando – electric guitar, backing vocals
- Dan Higgins – horns, saxes, woodwinds
- Gary Grant – horns
- Jim Cox – horn arrangement, piano, sax arrangement, woodwind arrangement
- Robert Randolph – lead guitar
- Steve Dudas – electric guitar, acoustic guitar
- Billy Preston – piano, B3 organ, backing vocals on "Wrong All the Time"
- The Rose Stone Choir – backing vocals on "Oh My Lord"
- Rose Stone – choir arrangement on "Oh My Lord"
- Ringo Starr, Mark Hudson, Gary Burr – uboo drum band on "Hard to Be True"
- John Amato – saxes
- Chrissie Hynde – lead vocals on "Don't Hang Up"
- Barbara Bach – devil voice on "The Turnaround"
- Dean Grakal – background vocals on "The Turnaround"

Production

- Ringo Starr, Mark Hudson – producers
- Bruce Sugar – recording
- Kevin Churko, Gary Burr, Steve Dudas – additional recording
- Dave Way – mixing
- Lior Goldenberg, Ghian Wright, Andy Brohard – assistant engineers
- George Marino – mastering
- Tyrone Drake – art direction, design
- Barbara Starkey – cover photo
- Ringo Starr, Barbara Starkey, Mark Hudson, Gary Burr, Edward AJAJ, Teness Herman – additional photos

== Charts ==
| Chart (2005) | Peak position |
|---|---|
| US Independent Albums (Billboard) | 29 |
