= Live at the Greek Theatre 2008 =

Live album by Ringo Starr & His All-Starr Band
- Released: July 2010
- Recorded: 2 August 2008
- Venue: Greek Theatre (Los Angeles) Los Angeles, CA
- Genre: Rock
- Length: 70:56
- Label: Hip-O Records
- Producer: Ringo Starr

Ringo Starr & His All-Starr Band chronology
Y Not (2010)	Live at the Greek Theatre 2008 (2010)	Ringo 2012 (2012)

Professional ratings
Review scores
Source	Rating
Record Collector	2/5 stars

Live at the Greek Theatre 2008 is a live and video album released by Ringo Starr & His All-Starr Band in 2010.

== Overview ==
It is one of few albums with the All-Starr Band that Ringo Starr has released on a major label, this one being released on Universal Music Group, as well as his 2008 studio album Liverpool 8, which was released under Capitol Records.

News of the album was originally revealed on the Beatles' official website as well as Starr's official website.

The audio version removes several of the songs that were sung at the concert and that appeared on the video version.

== Track listing ==
1. Introduction / "With a Little Help from My Friends" (Lennon–McCartney) / "It Don't Come Easy" (Richard Starkey) (4:24)
2. "What Goes On" (Lennon, McCartney, Starkey) (3:48)
3. "The Stroke" (Billy Squier) (6:55)
  - Performed by Billy Squier
4. "Free Ride" (Dan Hartman) (5:23)
  - Performed by Edgar Winter
5. "Dream Weaver" (Gary Wright) (5:09)
  - Performed by Gary Wright
6. "Boys" (Luther Dixon, Wes Farrell) (4:03)
7. "Pick Up the Pieces" (Roger Ball) (6:12)
  - Performed by Hamish Stuart
8. "Act Naturally" (Johnny Russell, Voni Morrison) (3:25)
9. "Yellow Submarine" (Lennon–McCartney) (3:20)
10. "Never Without You" (Starkey, Hudson, Nicholson) (5:26)
11. "I Wanna Be Your Man" (Lennon–McCartney) (3:40)
12. "Who Can It Be Now" (Colin Hay) (4:55)
  - Performed by Colin Hay
13. "Photograph" (George Harrison, Richard Starkey) (3:56)
14. "Oh My My" (Richard Starkey, Vini Poncia) (5:02)
15. "With a Little Help from My Friends" / "Give Peace a Chance" (Lennon–McCartney) (5:18)

== The 2008 All-Starr Band line-up ==
- Ringo Starr – vocals, drums
- Billy Squier – vocals, guitar, bass
- Colin Hay – vocals, guitar
- Edgar Winter – vocals, keyboards, saxophone
- Gary Wright – vocals, keyboards, keytar
- Hamish Stuart – vocals, bass, guitar
- Gregg Bissonette – vocals, drums
