= Walk with You =

Single by Ringo Starr featuring Paul McCartney

from the album Y Not
- Released: 22 December 2009
- Genre: Rock
- Label: Hip-O Records
- Songwriter(s): Richard Starkey, Van Dyke Parks
- Producer(s): Ringo Starr, Bruce Sugar

Ringo Starr singles chronology
"Liverpool 8" (2007)	"Walk with You" (2009)	"Wings" (2012)

Paul McCartney singles chronology
""Sing the Changes" (The Fireman)" (2008)	"Walk with You" (2009)	"Meat Free Monday" (2009)

"Walk with You" is a song by Ringo Starr, released as a single from his 2010 studio album Y Not. It features fellow former Beatle Paul McCartney on backing vocals and bass. The track was not originally conceived as a collaboration with McCartney, who originally only planned to play bass on "Peace Dream."

The song was also used as Starr's entry on the iTunes exclusive 4-track Beatles EP 4: John Paul George Ringo, released in 2014.

== Composition ==
In a promotional video, Starr said that "Walk with You" was originally intended to be a "gospelly" song. Starr called Van Dyke Parks and asked him to collaborate on writing a "God song," but Parks said he did not write about God. They reworked the melody and completed the track as a song about the power of friendship. During the recording of "Peace Dream," Starr played Paul McCartney several tracks he had completed for Y Not. McCartney developed the "trailing" duet in the melody of "Walk with You."

== Personnel ==
- Ringo Starr – drums, vocals, background vocals and percussion
- Paul McCartney – additional vocals, bass
- Steve Dudas – guitar
- Ann Marie Calhoun – violin
- Bruce Sugar – keyboards and string arrangement
