= Most Famous Hits =

Video by Ringo Starr and His All-Starr Band
- Released: Apr 14, 2003
- Genre: Rock and roll

Most Famous Hits is a live concert DVD by Ringo Starr and His All-Starr Band release April 14, 2003. The concert features accompaniments by Joe Walsh, Clarence Clemons and others. Running time is 111 Minutes.

== Track listing ==
1. It Don't Come Easy (Ringo Starr)
2. No No Song (Starr)
3. Yellow Submarine (Starr)
4. Iko Iko (Dr. John)
5. The Weight (Levon Helm)
6. Circles (Billy Preston)
7. Act Naturally (Starr)
8. Honey Don't (Starr)
9. Friend of Mine (Billy Preston, Clarence Clemons)
10. Shape I'm In (Helm)
11. "I Wanna Be Your Man" (Starr)
12. Life in the Last Lane (Joe Walsh)
13. Up On Cripple Creek (Helm)
14. Boys (Starr)
15. Bein' Angry Is a Full Time Job (Nils Lofgren)
16. Right Place, Wrong Time (John)
17. Quarter to Three (Clemons)
18. Rocky Mountain Way (Walsh)
19. Photograph (Starr)
20. With a Little Help from My Friends (Starr)
21. Remembered

== Personnel ==
- Ringo Starr – vocals, drums
- Joe Walsh – guitar, vocals
- Nils Lofgren – guitar, vocals
- Billy Preston – keyboards, vocals
- Dr. John – keyboards, vocals
- Rick Danko – bass, vocals
- Jim Keltner – drums
- Zak Starkey – drums
- Levon Helm – drums, vocals
- Clarence Clemons – saxophone, percussion, vocals
