= Ringo Starr and His All Starr Band Volume 2: Live from Montreux =

Live album by Ringo Starr & His All-Starr Band
- Released: 14 September 1993
- Recorded: 13 July 1992
- Venue: Montreux Jazz Festival, Montreux, Switzerland
- Genre: Rock
- Length: 65:11
- Label: Rykodisc
- Producer: Ringo Starr

Ringo Starr chronology
Time Takes Time (1992)	Ringo Starr and His All Starr Band Volume 2: Live from Montreux (1993)	Ringo Starr and His Third All-Starr Band Volume 1 (1997)

Ringo Starr and His All Starr Band Volume 2: Live from Montreux is Ringo Starr's second official live album and was released in September 1993.

== Live and content ==
Starr was once again supported by his All-Starr Band, with the first of many line-up changes. Retained from the original 1989/1990 inaugural line-up were Joe Walsh and Nils Lofgren. Newcomers were Timothy B. Schmit, Dave Edmunds, Todd Rundgren, Burton Cummings, Tim Cappello, and Starr's own son, Zak Starkey, on drums.

While Starr performed new material from Time Takes Time, he mostly chose his Beatles' standards on this occasion, namely "Yellow Submarine", "With a Little Help from My Friends" and his cover of The Shirelles' "Boys", which had appeared on the Beatles' first album, Please Please Me, in 1963. The members of his All-Starr Band also performed lead on many different songs during the live recording.

== Release ==
Professional ratings
Review scores
Source	Rating
AllMusic	3/5 stars
Encyclopedia of Popular Music	2/5 stars
The Essential Rock Discography	5/10
MusicHound	woof!

Following up on the 1990 album Ringo Starr and His All-Starr Band, this new album was a recording of a performance in Montreux in 1992, shortly after the release of Starr's studio album Time Takes Time. Ringo Starr and His All Starr Band Volume 2: Live from Montreux was released worldwide on Rykodisc, on 14 September 1993, (Note: US Rykodisc RCD 202664) eventually being deleted towards the end of the 1990s. To help promote the album, Starr appeared on NBC's Today television show, on 13 October 1993. Due to his heavy involvement in The Beatles Anthology, Starr didn't release any material until 1997, a limited edition live release of his 1995 tour exclusively through the Blockbuster video store chain, which was then followed by the major-label studio album, Vertical Man, in 1998.

== Track listing ==
No.	Title	Writer(s)	Featured artist	Length
1.	"The Really 'Serious' Introduction"	introduction	Quincy Jones	2:04
2.	"I'm the Greatest"	John Lennon	Ringo Starr	3:28
3.	"Don't Go Where the Road Don't Go"	Richard Starkey; Johnny Warman; Gary Grainger	Starr	4:45
4.	"Yellow Submarine"	Lennon; Paul McCartney	Starr	4:10
5.	"Desperado"	Don Henley; Glenn Frey	Joe Walsh	2:33
6.	"I Can't Tell You Why"	Timothy B. Schmit; Henley; Frey	Timothy B. Schmit	5:14
7.	"Girls Talk"	Elvis Costello	Dave Edmunds	3:35
8.	"Weight of the World"	Brian O'Doherty; Fred Velez	Starr	4:11
9.	"Bang the Drum All Day"	Todd Rundgren	Todd Rundgren	3:40
10.	"Walking Nerve"	Nils Lofgren	Nils Lofgren	4:06
11.	"Black Maria"	Rundgren	Rundgren	5:27
12.	"In the City"	Joe Walsh; Barry DeVorzon	Walsh	4:33
13.	"American Woman"	Burton Cummings; Randy Bachman; Garry Peterson; Jim Kale	Burton Cummings	6:21
14.	"Boys"	Luther Dixon; Wes Farrell	Starr	3:50
15.	"With a Little Help from My Friends"	Lennon; McCartney	Starr	7:07

== Personnel ==
Ringo Starr and His All-Starr Band

- Ringo Starr – drums, vocals
- Joe Walsh – guitars, vocals
- Timothy B. Schmit – bass, vocals
- Dave Edmunds – guitars, vocals
- Todd Rundgren – guitars, vocals
- Nils Lofgren – guitars, vocals
- Burton Cummings – keyboards, vocals
- Tim Cappello – saxophone
- Zak Starkey – drums
