= Ringo Starr and Friends =

Live album by Ringo Starr
- Released: 15 August 2006
- Genre: Rock
- Length: 62:00
- Label: Disky
- Producer: Richard Starkey; David Fishof

Ringo Starr chronology
Choose Love (2005)	Ringo Starr and Friends (2006)	Photograph: The Very Best of Ringo Starr (2007)

Ringo Starr and Friends is a 2006 live album by English rock musician and ex-Beatle Ringo Starr, following his 2005–2006 tour. The album features the tracks from the All-Starr Band's 2001 tour. The album is a budget-release version of the King Biscuit Flower Hour Presents Ringo & His New All-Starr Band album released in 2002, containing the same tracks but omitting "The No No Song" and "Back Off Boogaloo." The album had limited pressing and was only released in Europe. Ringo's friends included on the album are Ian Hunter, Howard Jones, Roger Hodgson, Sheila E, Greg Lake and Mark Rivera.

== Track listing ==
1. "Photograph" - Ringo Starr -(George Harrison, Richard Starkey) – 4:21
2. "Act Naturally" - Ringo Starr - (Johnny Russell, Voni Morrison) – 2:29
3. "All the Young Dudes" – Ian Hunter - (David Bowie) – 5:35
4. "Don't Go Where the Road Don't Go" – Ringo Starr - (Ringo Starr, Johnny Warman) – 4:34
5. "No One Is to Blame" - Howard Jones - (Howard Jones) – 6:11
6. "Yellow Submarine" - Ringo Starr - (Lennon–McCartney) – 3:06
7. "The Logical Song" - Roger Hodgson - (Rick Davies, Roger Hodgson) – 3:48
8. "Glamorous Life" - Sheila E. -(Prince) – 9:03
9. "I Wanna Be Your Man" - Ringo Starr - (Lennon-McCartney) – 3:24
10. "Give a Little Bit" - Roger Hodgson - (Rick Davies, Roger Hodgson) – 4:20
11. "Take the Long Way Home" - Roger hodgson - (Rick Davies, Roger Hodgson) – 4:37
12. "You're Sixteen" - Ringo Starr - (Sherman Brothers) – 2:29
13. "Lucky Man" - Greg Lake -(Greg Lake) – 4:41
14. "With a Little Help from My Friends" - Ringo Starr - (Lennon–McCartney) – 5:34

== Personnel ==
Ringo Starr & His All-Starr Band

- Ringo Starr - vocals on 1, 2, 4, 6, 9, 12, 14, drums
- Roger Hodgson - guitars, vocals on 7, 10, 11
- Ian Hunter - guitars, vocals on 3
- Greg Lake - bass, acoustic guitar, vocals on 13
- Howard Jones - keyboards, synthesizer solo on 13, vocals on 5
- Sheila E - drums, vocals on 8
- Mark Rivera - flute, saxophone
