= Ringo Starr & His All-Starr Band =

English rock supergroup

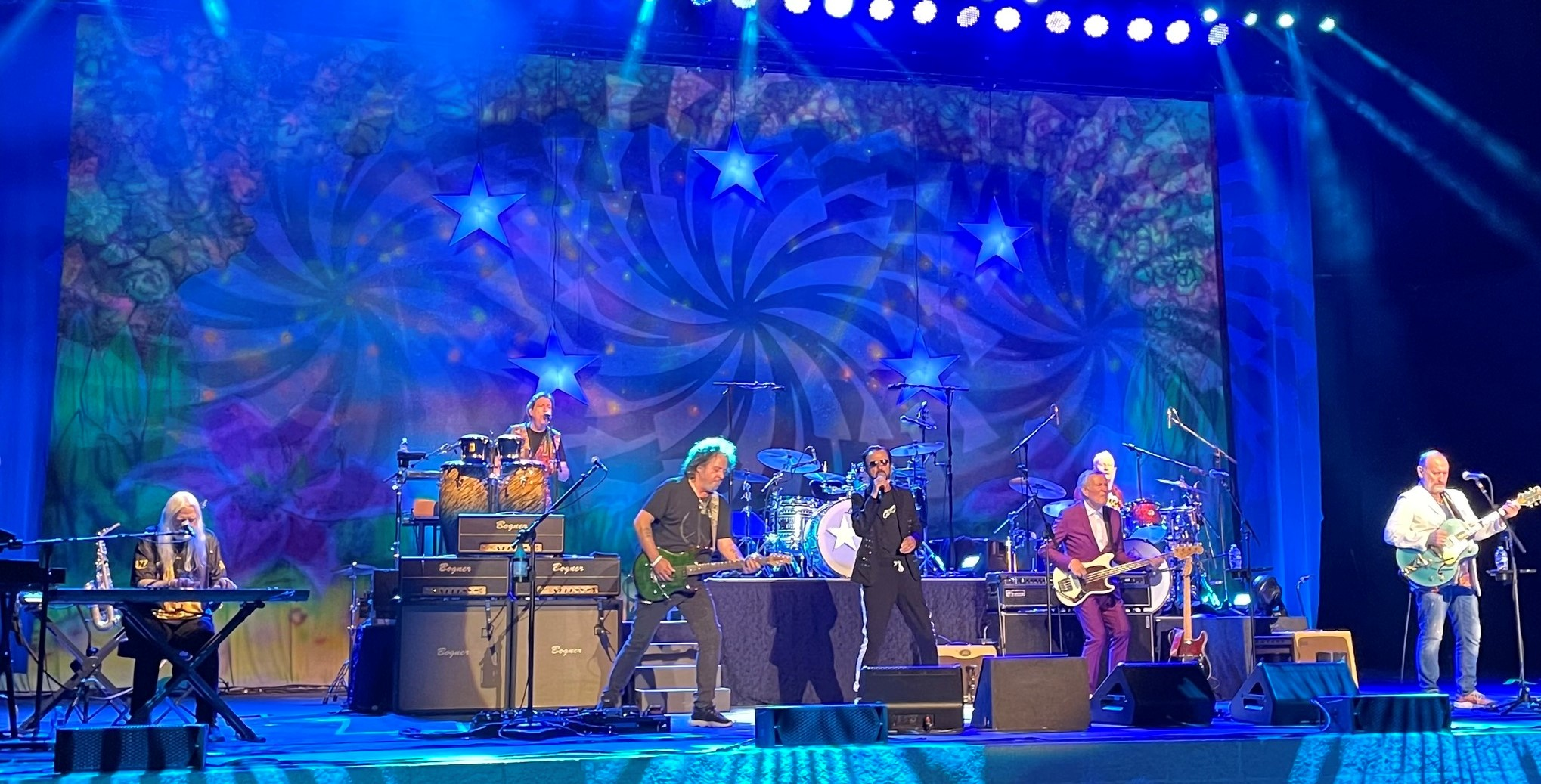
- Ringo Starr & His All-Starr Band performing in 2022. (left to right) Edgar Winter, Warren Ham, Steve Lukather, Ringo Starr, Hamish Stuart, Gregg Bissonette and Colin Hay.

Background information
- Origin: London, England
- Genre: Rock
- Years active: 1989–present
- Labels: EMI; Rykodisc; Blockbuster; King Biscuit; Koch; Disky
- Members: Ringo Starr; Colin Hay; Hamish Stuart; Gregg Bissonette; Steve Lukather; Warren Ham; Buck Johnson
- Past members: (see the Tours and members section)

Ringo Starr & His All-Starr Band are a live rock supergroup founded in 1989 with shifting personnel, led by former Beatles drummer and vocalist Ringo Starr.

== History and description ==
Since 1989, Starr has toured with sixteen variations of the band, where "everybody on stage is a star in their own right". Ringo Starr and his All-Starr Band is a concept that was created by producer David Fishof..

The idea for a large scale touring operation with guests was floated by Starr In the October 1976 issue of Creem magazine. Starr told writer Richard Cromelin, "It's a matter of finding the situation I would go out under...I don't want to go out and say, 'It's Ringo Starr for two hours, how do you do and now we'd like to slow the tempo down a little'...I want to go out in a sort of rock 'n' roll circus situation, whatever that may be. I've thought about it and I've talked to certain people and they think that would be wonderful..."

The band has consistently toured for over three decades, and rotates its line-up depending on availability of musicians and at Starr's discretion. All-Starr Band shows generally feature 10–12 songs sung by Starr, including those he performed with the Beatles and in his solo career. Mixed with Starr's songs are those performed by the All-Starrs (usually 2–3 per person), generally the biggest hits from their respective groups or solo careers.

The All-Starr Band does not compose original music, but a number of live albums featuring the group have been released. The sole exception is the track "Island in the Sun", off Starr's 2015 album Postcards from Paradise, which was co-written and performed by Starr and every member of that year's All-Starr Band.

=== Current members ===
As of 2025 the band lineup includes the following members:

- Ringo Starr – vocals, drums, percussion, piano, keyboards (1989–present)
- Colin Hay – guitar, harmonica, vocals (2003, 2008, 2018–present)
- Hamish Stuart – bass, guitar, vocals (2006–2008, 2019–present)
- Gregg Bissonette – drums, percussion, trumpet, backing vocals (2008–present)
- Steve Lukather – guitars, bass, vocals (2012–present)
- Warren Ham – saxophone, percussion, keyboards, harmonica, vocals (2014–present)
- Buck Johnson – keyboards, backing vocals (2024–present)

=== Former members ===
- Joe Walsh – guitar, piano, keyboards, talkbox, vocals (1989–1992; occasional guest 1995–2024)
- Nils Lofgren – guitar, accordion, vocals (1989–1992; occasional guest 1995–2019)
- Dr. John – piano, bass, vocals (1989; guest 2008)
- Billy Preston – keyboards, vocals (1989, 1995)
- Rick Danko – bass, guitar, vocals (1989)
- Levon Helm – drums, harmonica, vocals (1989; guest 2008)
- Clarence Clemons – saxophone, tambourine, percussion, vocals (1989, 2011)
- Jim Keltner – drums (1989; occasional guest 2006–2026)
- Todd Rundgren – guitar, harmonica, keyboards, drums, percussion, tambourine, bass, vocals (1992, 1999, 2012–2017)
- Dave Edmunds – guitar, vocals (1992, 2000)
- Burton Cummings – keyboards, guitar, tambourine, harmonica, flute, vocals (1992)
- Timothy B. Schmit – bass, guitar, vocals (1992; guest 1997)
- Zak Starkey – drums (1992–1995; occasional guest 1989–2010)
- Timmy Cappello – saxophone, percussion, keyboards, harmonica, vocals (1992, 1999)
- Randy Bachman – guitar, vocals (1995)
- Mark Farner – guitar, harmonica, vocals (1995; guest 1997)
- Felix Cavaliere – organ, keyboards, percussion, vocals (1995; guest 2012)
- John Entwistle – bass, vocals (1995)
- Mark Rivera – saxophone, percussion, organ, keyboards, guitar, bass, harmonica, vocals (1995–1998, 2000–2003, 2011–2013; occasional guest 2010–2019), musical director (1995–present)
- Peter Frampton – guitar, talk box, vocals (1997–1998; guest 2012)
- Gary Brooker – keyboards, organ, vocals (1997–1999; guest 2010)
- Jack Bruce – bass, keyboards, guitar, vocals (1997–2000; guest 2010)
- Simon Kirke – drums, vocals (1997–2000; guest 2003)
- Scott Gordon – harmonica (on "Love Me Do" only) (1998)
- Eric Carmen – keyboards, guitar, bass, vocals (2000; occasional guest 1989–2019)
- Roger Hodgson – guitar, keyboards, vocals (2001)
- Ian Hunter – guitar, keyboards, vocals (2001)
- Howard Jones – keyboards, vocals (2001; guest 2023)
- Greg Lake – bass, acoustic guitar, vocals (2001)
- Sheila E. – drums, vocals (2001–2006; guest 2008)
- Paul Carrack – keyboards, guitar, vocals (2003)
- John Waite – bass, guitar, vocals (2003)
- Billy Squier – guitar, bass, vocals (2006, 2008; occasional guest 2010–2014)
- Richard Marx – guitar, keyboards, vocals (2006; occasional guest 2010–2012)
- Rod Argent – organ, keyboards, vocals (2006)
- Gary Wright – keyboards, vocals (2008–2011; guest 2012)
- Wally Palmar – guitar, harmonica, vocals (2010; guest 2019)
- Rick Derringer – guitar, vocals (2010)
- Richard Page – bass, acoustic guitar, vocals (2010–2017; guest 2019)
- Gregg Rolie – organ, keyboards, vocals (2012–2021; guest 2024)
- Graham Gouldman – bass, guitar, vocals (2018)
- Edgar Winter – keyboards, saxophone, percussion, vocals (2006–2011, 2022–2024; guest 2012 and 2019)

=== Guests ===
- Garth Hudson (The Band) – accordion (several shows in 1989)
- Bruce Springsteen – guitar (during one show played on "Get Back" sung by Billy Preston, "Long Tall Sally", "Photograph", "With a Little Help from My Friends" in 1989)
- John Candy – tambourine (1989)
- Paul Shaffer – (during almost all the second set at Holmdel, NJ – Garden State Arts Center – Saturday, 5 August 1989)
- Tom Lofgren (Nils Lofgren's brother) (during Columbia, MD – Merriweather Post Pavilion – Tuesday, 8 August 1989 and in 1992)
- Harry Nilsson – vocals (performed "Without You" at one show only, it was his last public appearance in 1992)
- James Gang members play with Joe Walsh during the solo spot at Cuyahoga Falls, OH Wednesday. 10 June 1992
- Jeff Healey (1992)
- Mike Lofgren (1992)
- Hoyt Axton (1992)
- Bonnie Raitt (1992)
- Gary Busey (1992)
- Kenny Passarelli played Meadows with Joe Walsh (1992)
- Steven Tyler (Aerosmith) – drums (played drums in the encore for one show: on Boston, MA Wednesday, 19 July 1995)
- Max Weinberg on various shows in 1989, 1995, joined the All-Starr band on 3/6/97 Holmdel, NJ
- Slash (Guns N' Roses) – guitar (1995)
- Stevie Nicks (1995)
- Ginger Baker (Cream) – drums (at several shows on Cream songs in 1997–1998 and in 1999)
- Leo Kottke (1997–1998)
- Bob Mayo - Keyboards (Joined Peter Frampton at Jones Beach 6/7/97 to perform "Lines on My Face")
- Eric Burdon joined the All-Starr band for 'With a Little Help from My Friends' at Universal City show (3/05/1997)
- Eric Stuart – guitar, vocals (was opening act at select shows 1997–1998)
- Andy Summers – guitar (at several shows in 1999 and one in 2000 on "Theme for an Imaginary Western" with Jack Bruce)
- Michael McDonald - vocals (on "With a Little Help from My Friends" in San Diego 2000)
- Gary Puckett - vocals (on "With a Little Help from My Friends" in San Diego 2000)
- Steven Van Zandt – vocals (one show only in 2003 and on "With a Little Help from My Friends" at Radio City Music Hall in 2006 and Mayo Performing Arts Center in 2012)
- Gary Burr – vocals (one show only in 2003 and on "With a Little Help from My Friends" in Las Vegas, NV in 2006)
- Pete Townshend - vocals (on "With a Little Help from My Friends" in Las Vegas, NV in 2006)
- Jeff Lynne - vocals (on "With a Little Help from My Friends" in Las Vegas, NV in 2006 and on 7/7/10, Radio City Music Hall)
- Peter Asher - vocals (on "With a Little Help from My Friends" in Las Vegas, NV in 2006
- Paul McCartney – bass, vocals (7/7/10, Radio City Music Hall, played bass and sang "Birthday")
- Pat Mastelotto (Mr. Mister and King Crimson) – Drums (on "With a Little Help from My Friends" in 2013 in Melbourne)
- Chris Fryar (Zac Brown Band) - Drums (two shows - in 2015 in Birmingham and 2017 in Atlanta)
- Billy Squier - vocals (on "With a Little Help from My Friends" in 2014 in New York)
- Judy Collins - vocals (on "With a Little Help from My Friends" in 2014 in New York)
- Joan Baez – backing vocals (one show only in Paris, Olympia, on "With a Little Help from My Friends" in 2018)
- Don Powell (Slade) (one show only in Horsens, Denmark, on 15 June 2018)
- Klaus Voormann (Manfred Mann and Plastic Ono Band) – backing vocals (one show only in Hamburg, 11 June 2018, on "With a Little Help from My Friends" and "Give Peace a Chance")
- Benmont Tench (Tom Petty and the Heartbreakers) - vocals (on "With a Little Help from My Friends" at the Greek Theatre in 2023)
- David Paich (Toto) - vocals (on "With a Little Help from My Friends" at the Greek Theatre in 2023)
- Joseph Williams (Toto) - vocals (on "With A Little Help From My Friends at the Greek Theatre in 2026)
- John Travolta - vocals (on "With a Little Help from My Friends" at the BayCare Sound in Clearwater, FL in 2025)
- Robin Zander - vocals (on "With a Little Help from My Friends" at the BayCare Sound in Clearwater, FL in 2025)

== Tours and members ==
Ringo Starr & His All-Starr Bands
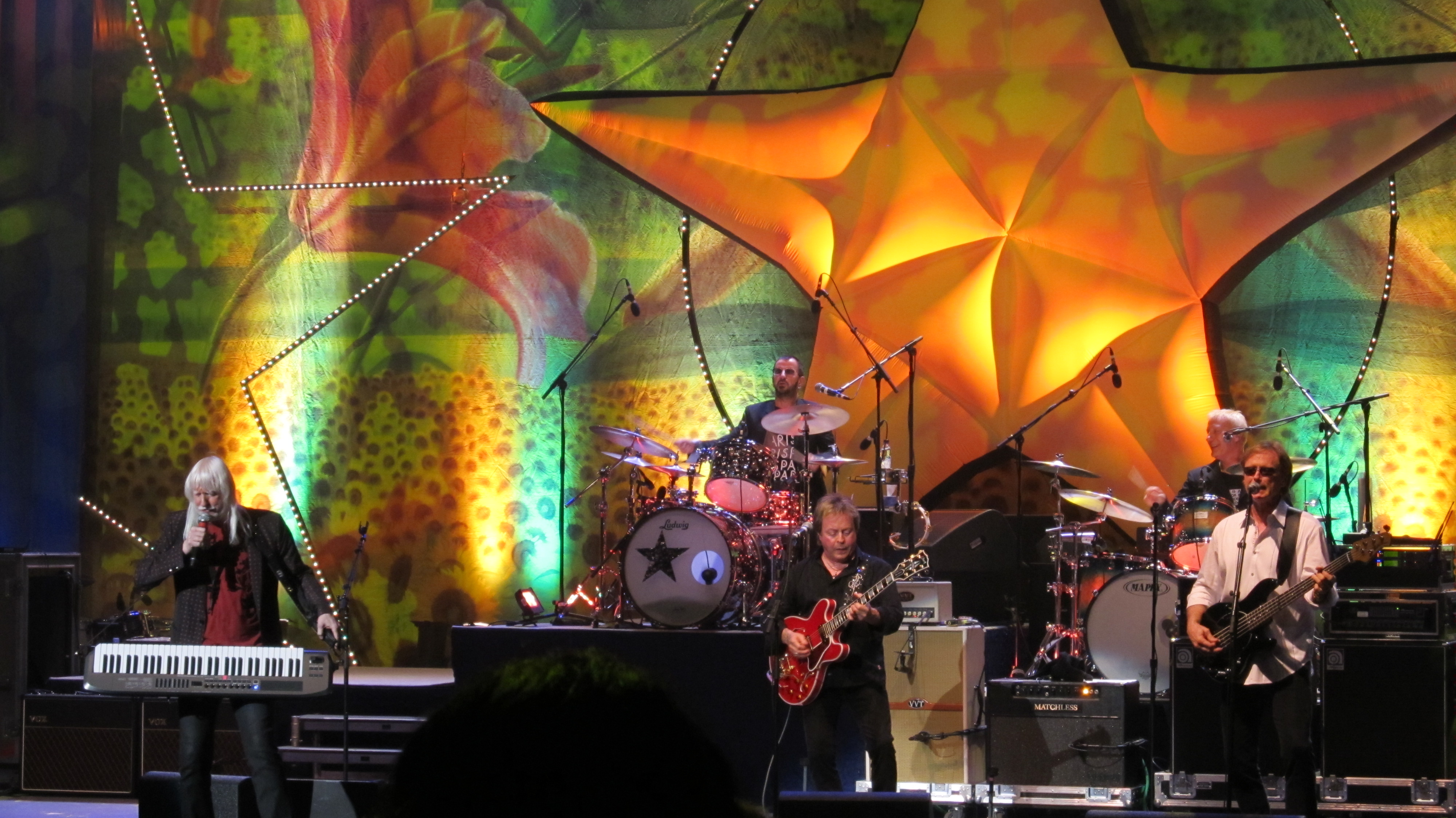
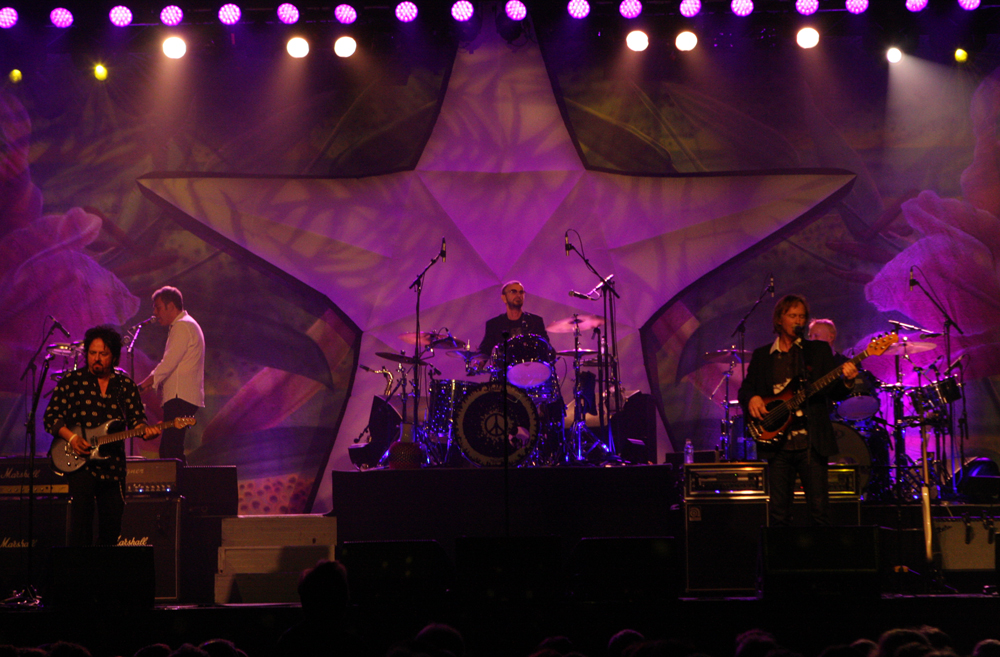
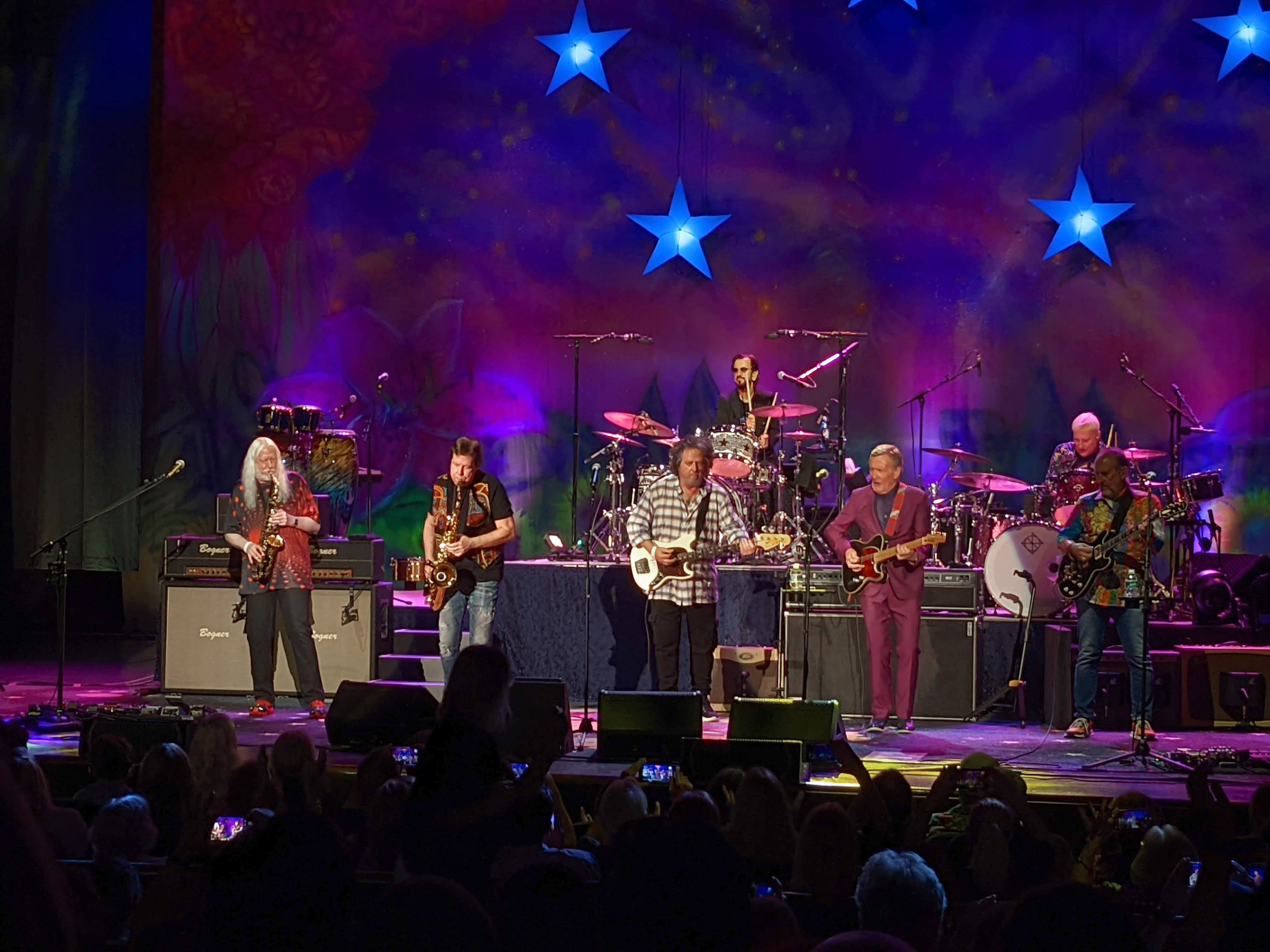
First All-Starr Band 1989	Ringo Starr – vocals, drums; Joe Walsh (Eagles and James Gang) – guitar, piano, talkbox, maracas, vocals; Nils Lofgren (Crazy Horse and E Street Band) – guitar, accordion, vocals; Dr. John – piano, bass, vocals; Billy Preston – keyboards, melodica, cowbell, vocals, musical director; Rick Danko (The Band) – bass, guitar, vocals; Levon Helm (The Band) – drums, mandolin, harmonica, vocals; Clarence Clemons (E Street Band) – saxophone, tambourine, cowbell, percussion, vocals; Jim Keltner – drums; Guests: Zak Starkey – drums (several shows on songs where Ringo was not on drums); Garth Hudson (The Band) – accordion (several shows); Bruce Springsteen – guitar (during one show played on "Get Back" sung by Billy Preston, "Long Tall Sally", "Photograph", "With a Little Help From My Friends"); John Candy: tambourine; Paul Shaffer – (during almost all the second set at Holmdel, NJ – Garden State Arts Center – Saturday, 5 August 1989); Tom Lofgren (Nils Lofgren's brother) (during Columbia, MD – Merriweather Post Pavilion – Tuesday, 8 August 1989); Max Weinberg (various shows)
Second All-Starr Band 1992	Ringo Starr – drums, percussion, cowbell, vocals; Joe Walsh (Eagles and James Gang) – guitar, keyboards, talk box, bass drum, vocals; Nils Lofgren (E Street Band) – guitar, vocals; Todd Rundgren (Nazz, Utopia and The New Cars) – guitar, keyboards, drums, percussion, tambourine, vocals; Dave Edmunds (Rockpile and Love Sculpture) – guitar, vocals; Burton Cummings (The Guess Who) – keyboards, guitar, tambourine, harmonica, flute, vocals; Timothy B. Schmit (Poco and Eagles) – bass, guitar, vocals; Zak Starkey – drums; Timmy Cappello – saxophone, percussion, keyboards, vocals; Guests: Harry Nilsson – vocals (performed "Without You" at one show only, it was his last public appearance); James Gang members play with Joe Walsh during the solo spot at Cuyahoga Falls, OH Wednesday. 10 June 1992; Jeff Healey; Tom and Mike Lofgren; Hoyt Axton; Bonnie Raitt; Gary Busey; Kenny Passarelli played Meadows with Joe Walsh; Other: Peter Cetera– Left before the tour, replaced by Timothy B. Schmit.
Third All-Starr Band 1995	Ringo Starr – drums, vocals; Randy Bachman (Bachman-Turner Overdrive and The Guess Who) – guitar, vocals; Mark Farner (Grand Funk Railroad) – guitar, harmonica, vocals; Billy Preston – keyboards, vocals; Felix Cavaliere (The Rascals) – organ, keyboards, percussion, vocals; John Entwistle (The Who) – bass, vocals; Zak Starkey – drums; Mark Rivera – saxophone, percussion, guitar, vocals; Guest: Joe Walsh (Eagles and James Gang) – guitar, talk box, vocals (came in one show to play "Rocky Mountain Way"); Steven Tyler (Aerosmith) – drums (played drums in the encore for one show: on Boston, MA Wednesday, 19 July 1995); Max Weinberg; Slash; Stevie Nicks; Other: Nils Lofgren (E Street Band) – guitar, vocals (left before tour due to an expected reunion of Bruce Springsteen's E-street Band, replaced by Mark Farner, but was opening act at some shows and played at one encore); Clarence Clemons (E Street Band) – saxophone, tambourine, percussion, vocals (left before tour started due to an expected reunion of Bruce Springsteen's E-street Band, replaced by Mark Rivera)
Fourth All-Starr Band 1997-98	Ringo Starr – drums, vocals; Peter Frampton (Humble Pie, solo artist) – guitar, talk box, vocals; Gary Brooker (Procol Harum) – keyboards, organ, vocals; Jack Bruce (Cream) – bass, keyboards, guitar, vocals; Simon Kirke (Free and Bad Company) – drums, vocals; Mark Rivera – saxophone, guitar, organ, keyboards, percussion, vocals; Scott Gordon – harmonica on "Love Me Do" (1998 only); Guests: Ginger Baker (Cream) – drums (at several shows on Cream songs); Leo Kottke; Bob Mayo joined Peter Frampton at Jones Beach 6/7/97 to perform "Lines On My Face"; Mark Farner joined the All-Starr Band for "With a Little Help From My Friends" at Universal City show (3/05/1997); Timothy B. Schmit joined the All-Starr Band for "With a Little Help From My Friends" at Universal City show (3/05/1997); Eric Burdon joined the All-Starr Band for "With a Little Help From My Friends" at Universal City show (3/05/1997); Joe Walsh joined the All-Starr Band in Houston; Max Weinberg joined the All-Starr Band in Holmdel; Eric Stuart – guitar, vocals (was opening act at select shows); Others: Dave Mason (Traffic and Fleetwood Mac) – guitar, vocals (left before tour started)
Fifth All-Starr Band 1999	Ringo Starr – drums, vocals; Todd Rundgren (Nazz, Utopia and The New Cars) – guitar, percussion, vocals; Gary Brooker (Procol Harum) – organ, keyboards, vocals; Jack Bruce (Cream) – bass, keyboards, vocals; Simon Kirke (Free and Bad Company) – drums, vocals; Timmy Cappello – saxophone, keyboards, harmonica, guitar, vocals; Guests: Ginger Baker (Cream) – drums (at several shows on Cream songs); Andy Summers (The Police) – guitar (at several shows); Others: Joe Walsh (Eagles and James Gang) – guitar, vocals (left before tour started, but came on some shows to play on songs such as "Photograph" [Los Angeles on 18 March])
Sixth All-Starr Band 2000	Ringo Starr – drums, vocals; Dave Edmunds (Rockpile and Love Sculpture) – guitar, vocals; Eric Carmen (Raspberries) – keyboards, guitar, bass, vocals; Jack Bruce (Cream) – bass, keyboards, vocals; Simon Kirke (Free and Bad Company) – drums, vocals; Mark Rivera – saxophone, harmonica, percussion, vocals; Guests: Andy Summers (The Police) – guitar (one show only, played guitar on "Theme for an Imaginary Western" with Jack Bruce); Michael McDonald - vocals (on "With A Little Help From My Friends" in San Diego); Gary Puckett - vocals (on "With A Little Help From My Friends" in San Diego); Others: Billy Squier – guitar, vocals (left before tour started); Ray Davies (The Kinks) – guitar, vocals (left before tour started); Billy Preston – keyboard, vocals (left before tour started and replaced by Eric Carmen)
Seventh All-Starr Band 2001	Ringo Starr – drums, vocals; Roger Hodgson (Supertramp) – guitar, keyboards, vocals; Ian Hunter (Mott The Hoople) – guitar, keyboards, vocals; Howard Jones – keyboards, vocals; Greg Lake (Emerson, Lake & Palmer and King Crimson) – bass, acoustic guitar, vocals; Sheila E. – drums, vocals; Mark Rivera – saxophone, percussion, guitar, bass, harmonica, flute, vocals
Eighth All-Starr Band 2003	Ringo Starr – drums, keyboards, vocals; Colin Hay (Men at Work) – guitar, vocals; Paul Carrack (Ace, Squeeze, Mike + The Mechanics, Roxy Music, Madness, The Bleeding Heart Band and Spin 1ne 2wo) – keyboards, guitar, vocals; John Waite (The Babys and Bad English) – bass, guitar, vocals; Sheila E. – drums, vocals; Mark Rivera – saxophone, flute, bass, guitar, harmonica, percussion, vocals; Guests: Simon Kirke – drums (one show only); Steven Van Zandt (E Street Band) – vocals (one show only); Mark Hudson – vocals (one show only); Gary Burr – vocals (one show only); Alice Cooper -- vocals (Phoenix, AZ only) School's Out and one more song
Ninth All-Starr Band 2006	Ringo Starr – drums, vocals; Billy Squier – guitar, vocals; Richard Marx – guitar, keyboards, vocals; Edgar Winter – keyboards, saxophone, vocals; Rod Argent (The Zombies and Argent) – organ, keyboards, vocals; Hamish Stuart (Average White Band and Paul McCartney) – bass, vocals; Sheila E. – drums, vocals; Others: Mark Hudson – guitar, bass, vocals (left before tour started); Pete Townshend (The Who) - vocals (on "With a Little Help from My Friends" in Las Vegas, NV); Jeff Lynne (The Idle Race, The Move, Electric Light Orchestra, Traveling Wilburys) - vocals (on "With a Little Help from My Friends" in Las Vegas, NV); Peter Asher (Peter and Gordon) - vocals (on "With a Little Help from My Friends" in Las Vegas, NV); Gary Burr - vocals (on "With a Little Help from My Friends" in Las Vegas, NV); Jim Keltner - drums (on "With a Little Help from My Friends" in Las Vegas, NV); Mark Rivera (Billy Joel) - Stayed as musical director, but left the band because of a touring commitment to Billy Joel; Steven Van Zandt - vocals (on "With a Little Help from My Friends" 2006 at Radio City Music Hall)
Tenth All-Starr Band 2008	Ringo Starr – drums, vocals; Billy Squier – guitar, bass, vocals; Colin Hay (Men at Work) – guitar, vocals; Edgar Winter – keyboards, saxophone, vocals; Gary Wright (Spooky Tooth) – keyboards, vocals; Hamish Stuart (Average White Band) – bass, guitar, vocals; Gregg Bissonette (David Lee Roth) – drums, vocals; Guests: Levon Helm (The Band) (one show only) – drums; Dr. John - vocals (on "With a Little Help from My Friends" in Uncasville); Sheila E. - drums (on "With a Little Help from My Friends" in San Diego)
Eleventh All-Starr Band 2010–2011	Ringo Starr – drums, vocals; Wally Palmar (The Romantics) – guitar, harmonica vocals; Rick Derringer (The McCoys, Johnny Winter, the Edgar Winter Group) – guitar, vocals; Edgar Winter – keyboards, saxophone, vocals; Gary Wright (Spooky Tooth) – keyboards, vocals; Richard Page (Mr. Mister) – bass, vocals; Gregg Bissonette – drums, vocals; Mark Rivera – saxophone, percussion, vocals [November 2011 (Mexico-South America) leg only]; Guests: Paul McCartney – bass, vocals (7/7/10, Radio City Music Hall, played bass and sang "Birthday"); Joe Walsh – guitar, vocals (7/7/10, Radio City Music Hall); Jeff Lynne – vocals (7/7/10, Radio City Music Hall); Jim Keltner – drums (7/7/10, Radio City Music Hall); Zak Starkey – drums (7/7/10, Radio City Music Hall); Mark Rivera – tambourine ("Birthday"), saxophone ("Photograph"), vocals "With a Little Help from My Friends"
Twelfth All-Starr Band 2012–2017	Ringo Starr – drums, keyboards, percussion, vocals; Steve Lukather (Toto) – guitar, vocals; Gregg Rolie (Santana and Journey) – organ, keyboards, vocals; Todd Rundgren (Nazz, Utopia and The New Cars) – guitar, harmonica, bass, percussion, keyboards (only shows featuring "Love Is the Answer"), vocals; Richard Page (Mr. Mister) – bass, acoustic guitar, vocals; Gregg Bissonette – drums, percussion, vocals; Mark Rivera – saxophone, percussion, keyboards, guitar, vocals [2012 + 2013]; Warren Ham (Bloodrock, Kansas, Toto, and AD) – vocals, saxophone, harmonica, flute, percussion, keyboards [2014-2017]; Guests: Joe Walsh (Eagles and James Gang) – guitar, talk box, vocals (played at several shows only); Nils Lofgren (E Street Band) – Vocal (one show in Las Vegas 2013); Pat Mastelotto (Mr. Mister and King Crimson) – Drums (on "With a Little Help from My Friends" in 2013 in Melbourne); Christopher Cross – Vocals (one show in Houston); Chris Fryar (Zac Brown Band) - Drums (two shows - in 2015 in Birmingham and 2017 in Atlanta); Billy Squier - vocals (on "With a Little Help from My Friends" in 2014 in New York); Judy Collins - vocals (on "With a Little Help from My Friends" in 2014 in New York); Steven Van Zandt - vocals (on "With a Little Help from My Friends" in 2014 in New York, 2012 in Morristown, NJ)
Thirteenth All-Starr Band 2018	Ringo Starr – drums, percussion, piano, vocals; Steve Lukather (Toto) – guitars, vocals; Colin Hay (Men at Work) – guitars, harmonica, vocals; Gregg Rolie (Santana and Journey) – keyboards, vocals; Graham Gouldman (10cc) – bass, acoustic guitar, vocals; Gregg Bissonette – drums, trumpet, backing vocals; Warren Ham (Bloodrock, Kansas, Toto, and AD) – saxophone, harmonica, flute, percussion, keyboards, vocals; Guests: Joan Baez – backing vocals (one show only in Paris, Olympia, on "With a Little Help from My Friends"); Don Powell (Slade) (one show only in Horsens, Denmark, on 15 June); Klaus Voormann (Manfred Mann and Plastic Ono Band) – backing vocals (one show only in Hamburg, 11 June, on "With a Little Help from My Friends" and "Give Peace a Chance")
Fourteenth All-Starr Band 2019-2021 (Tour was cancelled in 2020 & 2021 due to COVID-19)	Ringo Starr – drums, percussion, piano, vocals; Steve Lukather (Toto) – guitars, bass, vocals; Colin Hay (Men at Work) – guitars, harmonica, vocals; Gregg Rolie (Santana and Journey) – keyboards, vocals; Hamish Stuart (Average White Band and Paul McCartney) – bass, guitar, vocals; Gregg Bissonette – drums, trumpet, backing vocals; Warren Ham (Bloodrock, Kansas, Toto, and AD) – saxophone, harmonica, flute, percussion, keyboards, vocals
Fifteenth All-Starr Band 2022–2024	Ringo Starr – drums, percussion, vocals; Steve Lukather (Toto) – guitars, bass, vocals; Colin Hay (Men at Work) – guitars, vocals; Edgar Winter – keyboards, saxophone, vocals; Hamish Stuart (Average White Band and Paul McCartney) – bass, guitar, vocals; Gregg Bissonette – drums, trumpet, backing vocals; Warren Ham (Bloodrock, Kansas, Toto, and AD) – saxophone, harmonica, flute, percussion, keyboards, vocals
Sixteenth All-Starr Band 2025–present	Ringo Starr – drums, percussion, vocals; Steve Lukather (Toto) – guitars, bass, vocals; Colin Hay (Men at Work) – guitars, vocals; Hamish Stuart (Average White Band and Paul McCartney) – bass, guitar, vocals; Gregg Bissonette – drums, trumpet, backing vocals; Warren Ham (Bloodrock, Kansas, Toto, and AD) – saxophone, harmonica, flute, percussion, keyboards, vocals; Buck Johnson (Hollywood Vampires, Aerosmith) – keyboards, backing vocals

== Discography ==
=== Live albums ===
Title	Year	Peak chart positions
Title	Year	GRE
Ringo Starr and His All-Starr Band	1990	—
Ringo Starr and His All Starr Band Volume 2: Live from Montreux	1993	—
Ringo Starr and His Third All-Starr Band Volume 1	1997	—
King Biscuit Flower Hour Presents Ringo & His New All-Starr Band	2002	—
Tour 2003	2004	—
Ringo Starr & His All Starr Band Live 2006	2008	—
Live at the Greek Theatre	2010	35
Live at the Greek Theatre 2019	2022	—
"—" denotes releases that did not chart or did not have a release in that territory.

=== Compilation albums ===
- The Anthology... So Far (2001)
- Extended Versions (2003)
- Ringo Starr and Friends (2006)

=== Singles ===
Year	Single	Album
1990	"It Don't Come Easy" (Live)	Ringo Starr and His All-Starr Band

=== As featured artist ===
Year	Title	Artist	Album
1990	"With a Little Help from My Friends" (Live)	Various Artists	Nobody's Child: Romanian Angel Appeal
2012	"Wings" (Live)	Various Artists	Songs After Sandy: Friends of Red Hook For Sandy Relief
2015	"Island in the Sun"	Ringo Starr	Postcards from Paradise

=== Video albums ===
List of video albums, with year released and chart positions
Title	Year	Peak chart positions
Title	Year	US
Ringo Starr and His All-Starr Band	1990	—
Volume 2: Live from Montreux	1993	—
Ringo Starr and His Third All-Starr Band Volume 1	1997	—
Ringo Starr and His Fourth All-Starr Band	1998	—
The Best of Ringo Starr and His All Starr Band So Far...	2001	—
Most Famous Hits	2003	—
Tour 2003	2003	—
Live 2006	2008	38
Live at the Greek Theatre 2008	2010	16
Ringo at the Ryman	2013	15
"—" denotes releases that did not chart or did not have a release in that territory.
