= King Biscuit Flower Hour Presents Ringo & His New All-Starr Band =

Live album by Ringo Starr & His All-Starr Band
- Released: 6 August 2002
- Recorded: 22 August 2001
- Venue: Rosemont Theatre, Rosemont, Illinois
- Genre: Rock
- Length: 73:56
- Label: King Biscuit
- Producer: Richard Starkey; David Fishof

Ringo Starr & His All-Starr Band chronology
The Anthology... So Far (2001)	King Biscuit Flower Hour Presents Ringo & His New All-Starr Band (2002)	Ringo Rama (2003)

Professional ratings
Review scores
Source	Rating
AllMusic	3/5 stars
Encyclopedia of Popular Music	2/5 stars

King Biscuit Flower Hour Presents Ringo & His New All-Starr Band is a live album by Ringo Starr released on 6 August 2002. (Note: US King Biscuit KBCCD 143)

== Overview ==
Starr's All-Starr Band was always evolving. While Mark Rivera remained from the previous band, the new players for the 2001 US tour here include Emerson, Lake & Palmer's Greg Lake, Mott the Hoople's Ian Hunter and - bringing a more updated sound to the proceedings - Supertramp's Roger Hodgson, Howard Jones and former Prince bandmember Sheila E. Starr naturally has the biggest share of the songs, performing his classic hits from the 1960s and 1970s - with the relatively recent "Don't Go Where the Road Don't Go" from 1992's Time Takes Time, with all his celebrity guests each having their moment in the spotlight.

== Reception ==
King Biscuit Flower Hour Presents Ringo & His New All-Starr Band was fairly well received by the critics upon its August 2002 release, though again, it failed to reach the charts.

== Track listing ==
No.	Title	Writer(s)	Performer	Length
1.	"Photograph"	Richard Starkey, George Harrison	Ringo Starr	4:21
2.	"Act Naturally"	Voni Morrison, Johnny Russell	Ringo Starr	2:32
3.	"Logical Song"	Rick Davies, Roger Hodgson	Roger Hodgson	3:55
4.	"No One Is to Blame"	Howard Jones	Howard Jones	6:11
5.	"Yellow Submarine"	Lennon–McCartney	Ringo Starr	3:07
6.	"Give a Little Bit"	Rick Davies, Roger Hodgson	Roger Hodgson	5:13
7.	"You're Sixteen"	Richard Sherman, Bob Sherman	Ringo Starr	2:37
8.	"The No-No Song"	Hoyt Axton, David Jackson	Ringo Starr	3:20
9.	"Back Off Boogaloo"	Richard Starkey	Ringo Starr	3:57
10.	"Glamorous Life"	Prince	Sheila E.	9:18
11.	"I Wanna Be Your Man"	Lennon–McCartney	Ringo Starr	4:01
12.	"Lucky Man"	Greg Lake	Greg Lake	4:44
13.	"Take the Long Way Home"	Rick Davies, Roger Hodgson	Roger Hodgson	4:44
14.	"All the Young Dudes"	David Bowie	Ian Hunter	5:35
15.	"Don't Go Where the Road Don't Go"	Richard Starkey, Johnny Warman, Gary Grainger	Ringo Starr	4:39
16.	"With a Little Help from My Friends"	Lennon–McCartney	Ringo Starr	5:34

== Personnel ==
- Greg Lake – bass, vocals, acoustic guitar
- Howard Jones – keyboards, vocals
- Ian Hunter – guitar, vocals, piano
- Roger Hodgson – guitar, vocals, piano
- Sheila E. – drums, percussion, vocals
- Mark Rivera – saxophone, guitar, bass, keyboard, harmonica, flute, percussion, vibraslap, backing vocals, musical director
