= Ringo Starr and His Third All-Starr Band Volume 1 =

Ringo Starr and His Third All-Starr Band, Volume 1

Live album by Ringo Starr & His All-Starr Band
- Released: 12 August 1997
- Recorded: 27 June 1995
- Venue: Nippon Budokan, Tokyo, Japan
- Genre: Rock
- Length: 45:53
- Label: Blockbuster
- Producer: Ringo Starr; David Fishof

Ringo Starr chronology
Ringo Starr and His All Starr Band Volume 2: Live from Montreux (1993)	Ringo Starr and His Third All-Starr Band, Volume 1 (1997)	Vertical Man (1998)

Professional ratings
Review scores
Source	Rating
AllMusic	4/5 stars
Encyclopedia of Popular Music	2/5 stars

Ringo Starr and His Third All-Starr Band, Volume 1 is a limited edition live album by Ringo Starr and his All-Starr Band, recorded at the Nippon Budokan in Tokyo, Japan. It was released on 12 August 1997 by Blockbuster (Note: UK Blockbuster Exclusive 00010-65127-2) for $5.99. The All-Starr Band included the return of the keyboardist Billy Preston from the First All-Starr Band, and Starr's son Zak Starkey continuing from on from the Second All-Starr Band.

== Track listing ==
No.	Title	Writer(s)	Lead vocals	Length
1.	"Don't Go Where the Road Don't Go"	Richard Starkey; Johnny Warman; Gary Grainger	Ringo Starr	4:52
2.	"I Wanna Be Your Man"	John Lennon; Paul McCartney	Starr	3:25
3.	"It Don't Come Easy"	Starkey	Starr	3:55
4.	"The Loco-Motion"	Gerry Goffin; Carole King	Mark Farner	3:24
5.	"Nothing from Nothing"	Billy Preston; Bruce Fisher	Billy Preston	3:33
6.	"No Sugar Tonight/New Mother Nature"	Randy Bachman; Burton Cummings	Randy Bachman	4:32
7.	"People Got to Be Free"	Felix Cavaliere; Eddie Brigati	Felix Cavaliere	4:53
8.	"Boris the Spider"	John Entwistle	John Entwistle	2:41
9.	"Boys"	Luther Dixon; Wes Farrell	Starr	3:08
10.	"You Ain't Seen Nothing Yet"	Bachman	Bachman	3:45
11.	"You're Sixteen"	Robert B. Sherman; Richard M. Sherman	Starr	2:48
12.	"Yellow Submarine"	Lennon; McCartney	Starr	3:45

== Personnel ==
Ringo Starr and His All-Starr Band

- Ringo Starr – drums, percussion, vocals
- John Entwistle – bass, vocals
- Billy Preston – keyboards, vocals
- Mark Farner – guitars, vocals
- Randy Bachman – guitars, vocals
- Felix Cavaliere – keyboards, vocals
- Zak Starkey – drums, percussion
- Mark Rivera – saxophone, percussion, guitar, backing vocals
