= Ringo Starr and His All-Starr Band (album) =

Live album by Ringo Starr & His All-Starr Band
- Released: 8 October 1990 (UK); 12 October 1990 (US)
- Recorded: 3 & 4 September 1989
- Venues: The Greek Theatre, Los Angeles, California
- Genre: Rock
- Length: 56:00
- Labels: EMI (UK); Rykodisc (US)
- Producers: Joe Walsh; Jim Nipar

Ringo Starr chronology
Starr Struck: Best of Ringo Starr, Vol. 2 (1989)	Ringo Starr and His All-Starr Band (1990)	Time Takes Time (1992)

Singles from Ringo Starr and His All-Starr Band
- 1. "It Don't Come Easy" Released: 1990

Professional ratings
Review scores
Source	Rating
AllMusic	3/5 stars
Encyclopedia of Popular Music	3/5 stars
The Essential Rock Discography	6/10
MusicHound	woof!
The Rolling Stone Album Guide	3/5 stars

Ringo Starr and His All-Starr Band is Ringo Starr's first official live album, and the first album recorded with his All-Starr Band, recorded in 1989 during his successful comeback tour and released in 1990. It was also Starr's first release of unheard material in seven years.

== Overview ==
After taking a hiatus from his solo career following 1983's Old Wave, Starr spent the next few years making TV appearances and guesting on other artists' recordings and gigs, as well as recording an album that would remain unissued.

In 1988, he and wife Barbara Bach accepted that they both were suffering from alcoholism and took steps to rehabilitate themselves. Once Starr was sober, he felt the need to work again. Before delving into an album, he wanted to tour, so Starr formed the All-Starr Band, which became in the following years an ever-changing live line-up of musicians that would back Starr up, in addition to singing lead vocals on one or more songs.

Booking himself on the road from July to September 1989, Starr was accompanied by Dr. John, Joe Walsh, Billy Preston, the Band's Levon Helm and Rick Danko, Nils Lofgren, Clarence Clemons, and session drummer Jim Keltner. The shows were often sold out and were well received. The performance contained here was recorded on the closing nights of the US tour at the Greek Theatre in Los Angeles.

== Release ==
Ringo Starr and His All-Starr Band was released through EMI on 8 October 1990 (Starr's first association with his first label since 1975). In the US however, Rykodisc assumed the distribution of the album, releasing it on 12 October 1990. (Note: US Rykodisc RCD5 1019) Failing to chart, the release would be deleted some years later.

The song "It Don't Come Easy" was released as a single from the album, backed with "The Weight" and two non-album tracks "Rocky Mountain Way" (sung by Joe Walsh) and "Act Naturally" (sung by Ringo).

A limited edition deluxe version of the album that included a bonus CD single was released only in the US.

Another song from the same performances as the album, "With a Little Help from My Friends", was released on the compilation album Nobody's Child: Romanian Angel Appeal.

== Track listing ==
Side one
No.	Title	Writer(s)	Lead vocals	Length
1.	"It Don't Come Easy"	Richard Starkey	Ringo Starr	3:17
2.	"No No Song"	Hoyt Axton; David Jackson	Starr	3:28
3.	"Iko Iko"	Rosa Lee Hawkins; Barbara Ann Hawkins; Joan Marie Johnson; James Crawford	Dr. John	6:10
4.	"The Weight"	Robbie Robertson	Levon Helm	5:57
5.	"Shine Silently"	Nils Lofgren; Dick Wagner	Nils Lofgren	6:45
6.	"Honey Don't"	Carl Perkins	Starr	2:44

Side two
No.	Title	Writer(s)	Lead vocals	Length
1.	"You're Sixteen"	Richard & Robert Sherman	Starr	2:59
2.	"Quarter to Three"	Frank Guida; Eugene Barge; Joseph Royster; Gary Anderson	Clarence Clemons	3:52
3.	"Raining in My Heart"	Felice and Boudleaux Bryant	Danko	5:22
4.	"Will It Go Round in Circles"	Billy Preston, Bruce Fisher	Billy Preston	4:20
5.	"Life in the Fast Lane"	Joe Walsh; Glenn Frey; Don Henley	Joe Walsh	6:40
6.	"Photograph"	Starkey; George Harrison	Starr	4:20

Deluxe edition bonus CD single
No.	Title	Writer(s)	Featured artist	Length
13.	"It Don't Come Easy"	Starkey	Starr	3:03
14.	"The Weight"	Robbie Robertson	Levon Helm and Rick Danko	5:48
15.	"Rocky Mountain Way"	Joe Walsh, Joe Vitale, Rocke Grace and Kenny Passarelli	Joe Walsh	8:11
16.	"Act Naturally"	Johnny Russell and Voni Morrison	Starr	2:33

== Personnel ==
Ringo Starr and His All-Starr Band

- Ringo Starr – drums, vocals
- Dr. John – piano, bass, vocals
- Billy Preston – keyboards, vocals
- Rick Danko – bass, guitar, vocals
- Joe Walsh – guitars, percussion, vocals
- Nils Lofgren – guitars, accordion, vocals
- Levon Helm – drums, harmonica, percussion, vocals
- Jim Keltner – drums, percussion
- Clarence Clemons – saxophone, percussion, vocals

Guest musicians

- Garth Hudson – accordion
- Zak Starkey – drums
