= Y Not =

Studio album by Ringo Starr
- Released: 12 January 2010
- Recorded: 2009
- Genre: Rock
- Length: 36:49
- Labels: Hip-O, UM^{e}
- Producers: Ringo Starr; Bruce Sugar

Ringo Starr chronology
Ringo Starr & His All Starr Band Live 2006 (2008)	Y Not (2010)	Live at the Greek Theatre 2008 (2010)

Singles from Y Not
- 1. "Walk with You" Released: 22 December 2009

Y Not is the sixteenth studio album by English singer-songwriter Ringo Starr, released on 12 January 2010 on the UM^{e} and Hip-O Records labels. The album features several guest musicians, including Paul McCartney, who sang backing vocals on "Walk with You", the lead single from the album.

== Music, lyrics and recording ==
"Peace Dream" features former Beatle Paul McCartney on bass; another Beatle, John Lennon is referenced in the song. "The Other Side of Liverpool" is about Starr's pre-Beatles days in Liverpool. "Walk with You" features shared vocals with McCartney. Starr duets with Joss Stone on closing track "Who's Your Daddy".

In addition to McCartney, the album includes collaborations with Joe Walsh, Van Dyke Parks, Ben Harper and Richard Marx. It was the first album of his career which Starr primarily produced (he had previously co-produced several albums).

== Release ==
The first single from the album, "Walk with You", released 22 December 2009.

In the US, the release of the album perpetuated the fact that The Beatles, either as a group, or as solo artists, have released or charted at least one song or album every calendar year since 1964.

== Reception ==
Professional ratings
Aggregate scores
Source	Rating
Metacritic	60/100
Review scores
Source	Rating
AllMusic	3/5 stars
Billboard	72/100
Consequence of Sound	C−
Entertainment Weekly	C
Galeria Musical	4/5 stars
Los Angeles Times	3/4 stars
Record Collector	1/5 stars
Rolling Stone	3/5 stars
Slant Magazine	2/5 stars
Uncut	3/5 stars

The album debuted at number 58 on the Billboard Top 200 chart, with 7,965 copies sold in the US during the first week of release. The album also charted on the Top Internet Albums chart in the US. As of February 2010, the album has sold over 30,000 copies worldwide.

Reviews for Y Not were mostly mixed. Review aggregator Metacritic, which assigns a score out of 100 based on critic ratings, rated the album 60 out of 100, based on 11 reviews. AllMusic's Stephen Thomas Erlewine writes of the album: "that friendly, shambling sound is Ringo, something Y Not proves without a shadow of a doubt by sounding virtually interchangeable with its immediate predecessors [...] Starr is all about cheerful reminders of happy times filled with Peace Dreams and memories of "The Other Side of Liverpool."" Erlewine concludes that "like there was on Liverpool 8, there is charm to Starr’s tried and true: exciting it is not but it’s as comforting as an old friend who doesn’t change, he just stays the same."

Jesse Cataldo of Slant Magazine rates the album two out of five stars. He writes that "it's nice to imagine that Ringo Starr's post-Beatles inability to produce much of consequence stems from his band-established character [...] this failure, as especially evidenced on Y Not, seems more predicated on some dearth of actual songwriting talent than the near-novelty quality of his persona." Although he contradicted that "to like it might even feel like charity, and would be excusable if the album's only fault was being mired in silliness", Cataldo added: "Flush with broad sentiment and a messy spread of good feelings, Y Not finds the funniest Beatle on the outside of the joke."

In a review for the Los Angeles Times, Randy Lewis opines that "the importance in life of sustained effort along a particular direction" is "a thought that's inescapable listening to the latest release from former Beatle Ringo Starr." He also states that "he spends a bit of time here simply banging away happily [...] But the heart of the 10-song collection comes from his continued exploration of how to hold on to noble ideals in the face of ever-rising cynicism and violence." Lewis concludes that "he holds securely to an upbeat perspective that borders on cliché [...] that's somehow reassuring coming from the guy who's spent most of his life in an intimate relationship with time."

== Track listing ==
No.	Title	Writer(s)	Length
1.	"Fill in the Blanks" (feat. Joe Walsh)	Richard Starkey, Joe Walsh	3:14
2.	"Peace Dream"	Starkey, Gary Wright, Gary Nicholson	3:34
3.	"The Other Side of Liverpool"	Starkey, Dave Stewart	3:23
4.	"Walk with You" (feat. Paul McCartney)	Starkey, Van Dyke Parks	4:42
5.	"Time"	Starkey, Stewart	3:49
6.	"Everyone Wins"	Starkey, Johnny Warman	3:54
7.	"Mystery of the Night"	Starkey, Richard Marx	4:05
8.	"Can't Do It Wrong"	Starkey, Gary Burr	3:45
9.	"Y Not"	Starkey, Glen Ballard	3:49
10.	"Who's Your Daddy?" (feat. Joss Stone)	Starkey, Joss Stone	2:29
Total length:			36:49

== Personnel ==
- Ringo Starr – lead vocals, drums, keyboards (5, 9), piano (1), backing vocals, percussion
- Steve Dudas – guitar
- Benmont Tench – Hammond organ, piano
- Michael Bradford – bass guitar (3, 5–9)
- Bruce Sugar – engineer, co-producer, keyboards
- Keith Allison – guitar, backing vocals

=== Guest musicians ===
- Paul McCartney – bass guitar (2), additional vocals, bass (4)
- Don Was – bass guitar (10), upright bass (8)
- Joe Walsh – guitar (1–2, 6), bass guitar (1), backing vocals (1)
- David A. Stewart – guitar (3, 5)
- Billy Squier – guitar (3, 8)
- Edgar Winter – horns (8), tenor and alto saxophones (10), backing vocals (2, 6)
- Joss Stone – lead vocals (10)
- Ben Harper – backing vocals (2)
- Richard Marx – backing vocals (7)
- Ann Marie Calhoun – violin (3–5)
- Tina Sugandh – tabla and chanting (2, 9)
- Cindy Gomez – backing vocals (3, 5)

== Charts ==
Chart (2010)	Peak position
German Albums (Offizielle Top 100)	75
Japanese Albums (Oricon)	190
US Billboard 200	58
US Top Rock Albums (Billboard)	16
