= Ringo Rama =

Studio album by Ringo Starr
- Released: 25 March 2003
- Recorded: 2002
- Studios: Whatinthewhatthe? Studios, Los Angeles; Rocca Bella, Village Recorder, London
- Genre: Rock
- Length: 49:52
- Label: Koch
- Producers: Mark Hudson; Ringo Starr

Ringo Starr chronology
| King Biscuit Flower Hour Presents Ringo & His New All-Starr Band (2002) | Ringo Rama (2003) | Extended Versions (2003) |

Singles from Ringo Rama
- 1. "Never Without You" Released: 3 March 2003; 2. "Imagine Me There" Released: 2003 (promo only)

Ringo Rama is the thirteenth studio album by English singer-songwriter Ringo Starr, released in 2003.

== Background and recording ==
They actually gave the Christmas album no support. We have now parted company due to their incompetence, they let me go. I'm hoping to record another studio album ... and I'm hoping it will be on any label other than Mercury.

— Ringo Starr, discussing his choice of leaving Mercury, 2000

As the follow-up to I Wanna Be Santa Claus (1999), it continues Starr's alliance with Mark Hudson as well as most of his collaborators from that last project. Annoyed that Mercury had not put enough promotion towards I Wanna Be Santa Claus, Starr left the label in 2000. Contributors this time around include Willie Nelson, Charlie Haden, Van Dyke Parks, Pink Floyd's David Gilmour, Shawn Colvin, Timothy B. Schmit, and Eric Clapton. Starr said "People would ask, "So who's on the record?" and we'd say, "Just a couple of local guys. You know, like Eric Clapton and Dave Gilmour." Because they do both live just around the corner." Recording had taken place at Starr's recording studio in London, Rocca Bella, and Hudson's Whatinthewhatthe? Studios in Los Angeles, with the sessions being produced by Starr, Hudson and Gary Nicholson.

== Music and lyrics ==
Starr commented that the opening track, "Eye to Eye", sounded "like there's a war going on and we're trying to make it a war of love." "Missouri Loves Company", a play on words of misery loves company, was written quickly after Dean Grakal thought of the title phrase. The song features Gilmour on guitar. "Instant Amnesia" features, as Starr mentions, "some of the best drumming I've ever played in the last ten, fifteen years." "Memphis in Your Mind" references several Sun Studio artists, such as Elvis Presley and Orbison. With George Harrison's late 2001 passing before Ringo Rama was started, Starr composed "Never Without You" in tribute to his friend, having Clapton perform the guitar solo duties. The song originally started out as a tribute to John Lennon and Harry Nilsson, but Starr thought the song was getting "too messy". After choosing to focus solely on Harrison, lines from Harrison's songs—"Within You Without You", "Here Comes the Sun" and "All Things Must Pass"—were included. Starr asked Clapton based on his stature as a friend to both Starr and Harrison: "We're all good friends. So I asked Eric to play and he said 'yeah'."

Starr wanted to include a Roy Orbison "growl" on the song "Memphis in Your Mind", and proceeded to call Orbison's widow, Barbara Orbison; she sent him a "growl" on a CD, with a message "I'm sending over a growl". The song also features Gilmour on guitar. The title for "Trippin' on My Own Tears" came about during a night out between Starr and Hudson when the two of them overheard a diner at the next table say, "I was trippin' on my own tears, I was so down," and Starr replied, "That's just a great line". The country-influenced "Write One for Me" was a duet with Willie Nelson, who sang on it at Starr's suggestion. (Note: Starr had previously dabbled in the country genre with the Beatles' cover of "Act Naturally" on Help! (1965), a song originally recorded by Buck Owens, and the Beaucoups of Blues album (1970).) Starr had a phone call with his lawyer, who was also Hudson's lawyer, to "tell them to write one for me, so they did—but they wrote a song with that as the title!" At that point the song was unfinished, but was later finished when they got together. Asked if "Love First, Ask Questions Later" was like another part of the Beatles' "All You Need Is Love", Starr responded that the song is how he feels "the world should be and my hope that we all might stay in love."

It was a lot of fun. You put four guys in the room, and the main battle was trying not to write about the woman who left us! Anybody says a line [and] we can write a song about it.

— Ringo Starr, on songwriting for the album, 2003

"Elizabeth Reigns" came about while Starr and Dean Grakal were recording at Rocca Bella Studio, some time before Queen Elizabeth II's Golden Jubilee. Asking Starr what ER stood for, Grakal proceeded to start on a song, with Starr exclaiming "I'm not going to sing about the Queen." "English Garden", which mentions Starr's wife Barbara Bach and their dog Buster, includes in the final part some verses taken from Paul McCartney's "Let 'Em In". Starr explained: "That always happens when you're sittin' in the garden, doesn't it? So I just put [the lines] in and called Paul for permission. He said, 'Sure.' He knew about it ahead of time." After looking at several albums where one artist would record all the instruments for a particular song, Starr wanted to do one such track, and the result was "I Really Love Her".

== Release ==
On 20 May 2002, Starr signed a recording contract with Koch. Released by Koch on 25 March 2003, (Note: US Koch 038,411-0) Ringo Rama managed a number 113 peak in the US on the Billboard 200, his first album in the 21st century to do so. The album also charted at number 1 on the Top Independent Albums chart in the US. The first 100,000 copies included a DVD of the recording sessions. (Note: US Koch KOC CD 8429) To help promote the album and the "Never Without You" single, Starr appeared on The Tonight Show with Jay Leno in the US on 13 March. During a show arranged for the press on 22 March, Starr and The Roundheads performed "Memphis in Your Mind" and "Never Without You", at the Bottom Line Club in New York City. Starr again performed "Never Without You" on Late Night with Conan O'Brien on 25 March; later that day for MTV's Total Request Live; and for Good Morning America on 9 April. On 21 October it was announced that a 3-disc version of the album would be released on 11 November, and included three bonus tracks, an interview disc and a DVD containing a "Making Of" documentary and the music video for "Never Without You". (Note: US Koch KOC-CD-9533) The bonus tracks were "OK Ray", "I'm Home" and "Blink", all of which were recorded for a movie.

== Reception ==
Professional ratings
Review scores
| Source | Rating |
|---|---|
| AllMusic | 3.5/5 stars |
| Encyclopedia of Popular Music | 3/5 stars |
| The Essential Rock Discography | 6/10 |
| PopMatters | (favourable) |
| Rolling Stone | 3/5 stars |
| The Rolling Stone Album Guide | 3/5 stars |

AOL Radio rated "Never Without You" at number 5 on their top 10 Starr songs list.

== Track listing ==
Ringo Rama track listing
| No. | Title | Writer(s) | Length |
|---|---|---|---|
| 1. | "Eye to Eye" | Richard Starkey; Mark Hudson; Steve Dudas; Dean Grakal | 3:19 |
| 2. | "Missouri Loves Company" | Starkey; Hudson; Dudas; Grakal | 3:33 |
| 3. | "Instant Amnesia" | Starkey; Hudson; Dudas; Grakal | 5:12 |
| 4. | "Memphis in Your Mind" | Starkey; Hudson; Dudas; Grakal; Gary Burr | 3:13 |
| 5. | "Never Without You" | Starkey; Hudson; Gary Nicholson | 5:24 |
| 6. | "Imagine Me There" | Starkey; Hudson; Burr | 3:55 |
| 7. | "I Think Therefore I Rock N Roll" | Starkey; Hudson; Grakal; Paul Santo | 3:25 |
| 8. | "Trippin' on My Own Tears" | Starkey; Hudson; Burr; Grakal | 3:31 |
| 9. | "Write One for Me" (featuring Willie Nelson) | Starkey; Hudson; Burr | 3:14 |
| 10. | "What Love Wants to Be" | Starkey; Hudson; Burr | 3:03 |
| 11. | "Love First, Ask Questions Later" | Starkey; Hudson; Burr; Grakal | 4:45 |
| 12. | "Elizabeth Reigns" | Starkey; Hudson; Burr; Dudas; Grakal | 3:57 |
| 13. | "English Garden" | Starkey; Hudson; Burr; Dudas; Grakal; Paul McCartney; Linda McCartney | 3:17 |

Bonus tracks
| No. | Title | Writer(s) | Length |
|---|---|---|---|
| 14. | "Blink" | Starkey; Hudson; Dudas; Grakal | 2:52 |
| 15. | "OK Ray" | Starkey; Hudson; Dudas | 3:02 |
| 16. | "I'm Home" | Starkey; Hudson; Dudas | 3:23 |

Note: "English Garden" features an interpolation of "Let 'Em In" by Wings, as well as a short hidden track entitled "I Really Love Her".

== Personnel ==
Personnel per booklet.

Musicians

- Ringo Starr – drums, percussion, lead vocal, keyboards on "Never Without You", electric guitar on "Imagine Me There", "I Think Therefore I Rock N Roll" and "I Really Love Her", acoustic guitar, slide guitar, bass and backing vocals on "I Really Love Her", megamouth on "Trippin' On My Own Tears"
- Steve Dudas – electric guitar, guitar solos on "Eye to Eye", "Instant Amnesia"
- Mark Hudson – electric and acoustic guitar, bass, keyboards, mellotron, Wurlitzer organ, backing vocals,
- Eric Clapton – guitar solos on "Never Without You" and "Imagine Me There"
- David Gilmour – guitar solos on "Missouri Loves Company" and "I Think Therefore I Rock N Roll"
- Cliff Downs – acoustic guitar
- Gary Nicholson – twelve string acoustic guitar
- Dean Grakal – acoustic guitar
- Grant Geissman – dobro
- Herb Pederson – banjo
- Jay Dee Maness – pedal steel
- Gary Burr – bass, acoustic and electric guitar, guitar solo on "What Love Wants to Be", backing vocals,
- Charlie Haden – upright bass
- Paul Santo– bass on "Elizabeth Reigns", electric and acoustic guitar, backing vocals, keyboards
- Jim Cox – Wurlitzer organ, B3 organ, piano
- Van Dyke Parks – accordion on "What Love Wants to Be", "Elizabeth Reigns" and "English Garden"
- Dan Higgins – Saxophone, flute, clarinet
- Gary S. Grant – trumpet, piccolo trumpet
- Mickey Raphael – harmonica, bass harmonica
- Roy Orbison – archived "mercy" growl on "Memphis in Your Mind"
- Barbara Starkey, Buster, Monly, Mr. B, sleeping birdies – background vocals on "English Garden"
- Sarah Hudson, Nicole Renee Harris, Christina Rumbley, Jack Blades, Sophia Sunseri – backing vocals on "Eye to Eye"
- Sarah Hudson, Christina Rumbley, Nicole Renee Harris, Victoria Shaw, Adam Ray, Mark O'Shea, John O'Shea, Jack Blades – backing vocals on "I Think Therefore I Rock N Roll"
- Timothy B. Schmit – backing vocals on "Missouri Loves Company", "Instant Amnesia", "Memphis in Your Mind", and "Write One for Me"
- Shawn Colvin – guest vocal on "Trippin' on My Own Tears"
- Willie Nelson – guest vocal on "Write One for Me"

Technical personnel

- Mark Hudson – producer, artwork
- Ringo Starr – producer
- Paul Santo, Bruce Sugar – recording
- Tim LeBlanc, Steve Dudas – additional recording
- Dave Way – mixing
- Tim LeBlanc, Damon Iddins, Matt Marrin – assistant engineers
- Josh Rosenberg, Amy Galland – production coordinators
- George Marino – mastering
- Jim Cox – string and horn arrangements
- Tyrone Drake – art direction and design
- Ringo Starr, Barbara Starkey, Mark Hudson, Dean Grakal – photos
- Mark Hudson – cover illustration
- Brent Carpenter, John Franck – DVD editing and design

== Charts ==
| Chart (2003) | Peak position |
|---|---|
| US Billboard 200 | 113 |
| US Independent Albums (Billboard) | 6 |
