= List of songs recorded by Ringo Starr =

Songs recorded by English musician

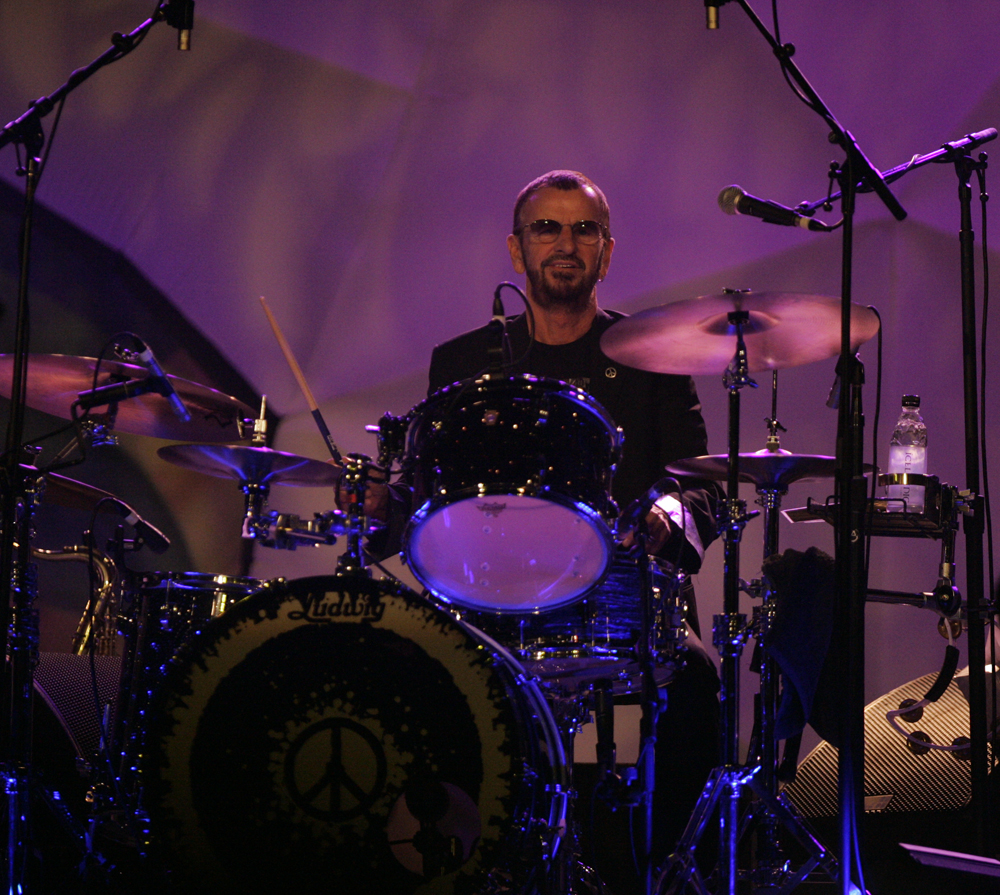
Ringo Starr performing with his All-Star Band in 2018

Ringo Starr is an English musician who has recorded hundreds of songs throughout his long career. As the drummer for the Beatles, Starr occasionally performed lead vocals, usually for one song an album. He wrote two songs for the group, "Don't Pass Me By" and "Octopus's Garden", and was credited as co-writer of others, including "What Goes On" and "Flying". Before their break-up in April 1970, he released his debut solo album, the George Martin-produced Sentimental Journey in March 1970, which contained cover songs each arranged by a different musician. He followed it in September 1970 with the Pete Drake-produced Beaucoups of Blues, which contained songs influenced by country music. Starr then collaborated with former bandmate George Harrison for the singles "It Don't Come Easy" (1971) and "Back Off Boogaloo" (1972), the latter of which Starr re-recorded twice in 1981 and 2017.

In 1973, Starr released the pop album Ringo, which featured an array of guest collaborators, including producer Richard Perry, his future co-writer Vini Poncia ("Oh My My"), and all former Beatles: Harrison ("Photograph"), John Lennon ("I'm the Greatest") and Paul McCartney ("Six O'Clock"). Starr's follow-up album, Goodnight Vienna (1974), featured many of the same collaborators as its predecessor, including Perry, Poncia, Lennon ("(It's All Down to) Goodnight Vienna"), as well as Elton John ("Snookeroo"), Billy Preston and Harry Nilsson ("Easy for Me"). Ringo's Rotogravure (1976) was his first to be produced by Arif Mardin and again featured contributions from Lennon ("Cookin' (In the Kitchen of Love)"), Harrison ("I'll Still Love You") and McCartney ("Pure Gold"), as well as Eric Clapton ("This Be Called a Song"). Starr ended the 1970s with the more disco-oriented Ringo the 4th (1977) and the rock album Bad Boy (1978), which both featured fewer celebrity contributors than his earlier releases; Starr ended his partnership with Poncia following these releases.

Starr's two releases of the 1980s were Stop and Smell the Roses (1981), which featured several guests like his earlier albums, including McCartney, Harrison, Nilsson, Ronnie Wood and Stephen Stills, and the Joe Walsh-produced Old Wave (1983). At the end of the 1980s, Starr began recording with his All-Starr Band, which, over many different iterations, features Starr and an assortment of musicians who had been successful in their own right with popular songs at different times. He continued to make music throughout the 1990s, contributing "You Never Know" to the soundtrack of Curly Sue (1991), releasing Time Takes Time (1992), Vertical Man (1998), which marked the beginning of his partnership with Mark Hudson, and the Christmas album I Wanna Be Santa Claus (1999). Starr's first album of the 2000s was Ringo Rama (2003), featuring the song "Never Without You", a tribute to Harrison, who died in late 2001. He continued his collaboration with Hudson with Choose Love (2005), whose title track featured references to several Beatles songs, ending it with Liverpool 8 in 2008.

Starr has continued to release music since the 2010s. He recorded "Walk with You" with McCartney in 2010 and has released multiple re-recordings of earlier songs, including "Step Lightly" and "Wings" on Ringo 2012, and "You Can't Fight Lightning", "Photograph" and his Beatles song "Don't Pass Me By" on 2017's Give More Love. What's My Name (2019) featured past collaborators Walsh and McCartney, who guest starred on a cover of "Grow Old with Me", one of the final songs written by John Lennon. From 2021 to 2024, Starr released five EPs: Zoom In, Change the World, EP3, Rewind Forward and Crooked Boy. A country and roots album, Look Up, produced by T Bone Burnett, was released in 2025. A second country album, Long Long Road, was released in 2026.

== Songs ==
Key
†	Indicates song not written or co-written by Ringo Starr

Name of song, writer(s), original release, producer(s) and year of release
Song	Writer(s) (Note: All songs written or co-written by Ringo Starr are credited under his real name, Richard Starkey.)	Original release	Producer(s)	Year	Ref.
"$15 Draw"	Sorrells Pickard †	Beaucoups of Blues	Pete Drake	1970	
"Act Naturally" (with Buck Owens)	Johnny Russell; Voni Morrison †	Non-album single	Jerry Crutchfield; Jim Shaw	1989	
"Adeline"	Linda Perry †	Crooked Boy (EP)	Linda Perry	2024	
"After All These Years"	Richard Starkey; Johnny Warman	Time Takes Time	Jeff Lynne	1992	
"Alibi"	Joe Walsh; Richard Starkey	Old Wave	Joe Walsh	1983	
"All by Myself"	Vini Poncia; Richard Starkey	Goodnight Vienna	Richard Perry	1974	
"All in the Name of Love"	Jerry Lynn Williams †	Time Takes Time	Phil Ramone	1992	
"Anthem"	Richard Starkey; Glen Ballard	Ringo 2012	Ringo Starr	2012	
"As Far as We Can Go"	Russ Ballard †	Old Wave	Joe Walsh	1983	
"Attention"	Paul McCartney †	Stop and Smell the Roses	Paul McCartney	1981	
"Baby Don't Go"	T Bone Burnett †	Long Long Road	T Bone Burnett	2026	
"Back Off Boogaloo" (Note: Starr has re-recorded "Back Off Boogaloo" twice: first for his 1981 album Stop and Smell the Roses and second for his 2017 album Give More Love.)	Richard Starkey (Note: The song is credited to Richard Starkey and George Harrison on the 2017 Give More Love version.)	Non-album single	George Harrison	1972	
"Bad Boy"	Lil Armstrong; Avon Long †	Bad Boy	Vini Poncia	1978	
"Bamboula"	Richard Starkey; Van Dyke Parks	Postcards from Paradise	Ringo Starr	2015	
"Be My Baby"	Joe Walsh; Richard Starkey	Old Wave	Joe Walsh	1983	
"Beaucoups of Blues"	Buzz Rabin †	Beaucoups of Blues	Pete Drake	1970	
"Better Days"	Richard Starkey; Grant Michaels; Sam Hollander	What's My Name	Ringo Starr	2019	
"Blindman"	Richard Starkey	B-side to "Back Off Boogaloo"	George Harrison	1972	
"Blink"	Richard Starkey; Mark Hudson; Steve Dudas; Dean Grakal	Ringo Rama (Deluxe edition)	Mark Hudson; Ringo Starr	2003	
"Blue Christmas"	Bill Hayes; Jay Johnson †	I Wanna Be Santa Claus	Mark Hudson; Ringo Starr	1999	
"Blue, Turning Grey Over You"	Andy Razaf; Fats Waller †	Sentimental Journey	George Martin	1970	
"Boat Ride"	Roger Brown †	Scouse the Mouse	Hugh Murphy	1977	
"Brandy"	Joseph B. Jefferson; Charles B. Simmons †	Stop and Smell the Roses (1994 reissue)	Ronnie Wood; Ringo Starr	1994	
"Breathless" (featuring Billy Strings)	T Bone Burnett †	Look Up	T Bone Burnett; Daniel Tashian; Bruce Sugar	2025	
"Bridges"	Richard Starkey; Joe Walsh	Postcards from Paradise	Ringo Starr	2015	
"Bye Bye Blackbird"	Mort Dixon; Ray Henderson †	Sentimental Journey	George Martin	1970	
"Call Me"	Richard Starkey	Goodnight Vienna	Richard Perry	1974	
"Can She Do It Like She Dances"	Steve Duboff; Gerry Robinson †	Ringo the 4th	Arif Mardin	1977	
"Can You Hear Me Call" (featuring Molly Tuttle)	T Bone Burnett †	Look Up	T Bone Burnett; Daniel Tashian; Bruce Sugar	2025	
"Can't Do It Wrong"	Richard Starkey; Gary Burr	Y Not	Ringo Starr; Bruce Sugar	2010	
"The Christmas Dance"	Richard Starkey; Mark Hudson; Jim Cox; Steve Dudas	I Wanna Be Santa Claus	Mark Hudson; Ringo Starr	1999	
"Christmas Eve"	Richard Starkey; Mark Hudson	I Wanna Be Santa Claus	Mark Hudson; Ringo Starr	1999	
"Christmas Time (Is Here Again)" (Note: Originally recorded by the Beatles)	John Lennon; Paul McCartney; George Harrison; Richard Starkey	I Wanna Be Santa Claus	Mark Hudson; Ringo Starr	1999	
"Choose Love" (Note: A re-recording appears on Starr's 2026 album Long Long Road.)	Richard Starkey; Mark Hudson; Gary Burr	Choose Love	Mark Hudson; Ringo Starr	2005	
"Come Back" (featuring Lucius)	T Bone Burnett †	Look Up	T Bone Burnett; Daniel Tashian; Bruce Sugar	2025	
"Come On Christmas, Christmas Come On"	Richard Starkey; Mark Hudson; Dean Grakal	I Wanna Be Santa Claus	Mark Hudson; Ringo Starr	1999	
"Coming Undone" (featuring Trombone Shorty)	Linda Perry †	Change the World (EP)	Ringo Starr; Bruce Sugar; Linda Perry	2021	
"Confirmation"	Richard Starkey; Glen Ballard	Postcards from Paradise	Ringo Starr	2015	
"Cookin' (In the Kitchen of Love)"	John Lennon †	Ringo's Rotogravure	Arif Mardin	1976	
"Coochy Coochy"	Richard Starkey	B-side to "Beaucoups of Blues"	Pete Drake	1970	
"Crooked Boy"	Linda Perry †	Crooked Boy (EP)	Linda Perry	2024	
"Cryin'"	Vini Poncia; Richard Starkey	Ringo's Rotogravure	Arif Mardin	1976	
"Dead Giveaway"	Richard Starkey; Ronnie Wood	Stop and Smell the Roses	Ronnie Wood; Ringo Starr	1981	
"Dear Santa"	Richard Starkey; Mark Hudson; Steve Dudas	I Wanna Be Santa Claus	Mark Hudson; Ringo Starr	1999	
"Devil Woman"	Richard Starkey; Vini Poncia	Ringo	Richard Perry	1973	
"Do You Like Me?" (with Cilla Black)	Herbert Darnley †	Cilla (Television programme)	–	1968	
"Don't Be Cruel"	Otis Blackwell; Elvis Presley †	Time Takes Time (Japanese edition)	Jeff Lynne	1992	
"Don't Go Where the Road Don't Go"	Richard Starkey; Johnny Warman; Gary Grainger	Time Takes Time	Jeff Lynne	1992	
"Don't Hang Up" (featuring Chrissie Hynde)	Richard Starkey; Mark Hudson; Gary Burr	Choose Love	Mark Hudson; Ringo Starr	2005	
"Don't Know a Thing About Love"	Richard Feldman; Stan Lynch †	Time Takes Time	Don Was	1992	
"Don't Pass Me By"	Richard Starkey	Give More Love	Ringo Starr	2017	
"A Dose of Rock 'n' Roll"	Carl Groszmann †	Ringo's Rotogravure	Arif Mardin	1976	
"Down and Out"	Richard Starkey	B-side to "Photograph"	Richard Perry	1973	
"Dream"	Johnny Mercer †	Sentimental Journey	George Martin	1970	
"Drift Away"	Mentor Williams †	Vertical Man	Mark Hudson; Ringo Starr	1998	
"Drowning in the Sea of Love"	Kenny Gamble; Leon Huff †	Ringo the 4th	Arif Mardin	1977	
"Drumming Is My Madness"	Harry Nilsson †	Stop and Smell the Roses	Harry Nilsson	1981	
"Early 1970"	Richard Starkey	B-side to "It Don't Come Easy"	George Harrison	1971	
"Easy for Me"	Harry Nilsson †	Goodnight Vienna	Richard Perry	1974	
"Electricity"	Richard Starkey; Glen Ballard	Give More Love	Ringo Starr	2017	
"Elizabeth Reigns"	Richard Starkey; Mark Hudson; Gary Burr; Steve Dudas; Dean Grakal	Ringo Rama	Mark Hudson; Ringo Starr	2003	
"English Garden"	Richard Starkey; Mark Hudson; Gary Burr; Steve Dudas; Dean Grakal	Ringo Rama	Mark Hudson; Ringo Starr	2003	
"Everybody's in a Hurry But Me"	Joe Walsh; Richard Starkey; John Entwistle; Eric Clapton; Chris Stainton	Old Wave	Joe Walsh	1983	
"Everyday"	Richard Starkey; Mark Hudson; Dean Grakal; Steve Dudas	Vertical Man (Japanese edition)	Mark Hudson; Ringo Starr	1998	
"Everyone and Everything"	Linda Perry †	EP3 (EP)	Linda Perry	2022	
"Everyone Wins"	Richard Starkey; Johnny Warman	Y Not	Ringo Starr; Bruce Sugar	2010	
"Eye to Eye"	Richard Starkey; Mark Hudson; Steve Dudas; Dean Grakal	Ringo Rama	Mark Hudson; Ringo Starr	2003	
"Fading In Fading Out"	Richard Starkey; Mark Hudson; Gary Burr	Choose Love	Mark Hudson; Ringo Starr	2005	
"Fastest Growing Heartache in the West"	Larry Kingston; Fred Dycus †	Beaucoups of Blues	Pete Drake	1970	
"February Sky"	Linda Perry †	Crooked Boy (EP)	Linda Perry	2024	
"Feeling the Sunlight"	Paul McCartney †	Rewind Forward (EP)	Ringo Starr	2023	
"Fill in the Blanks"	Richard Starkey; Joe Walsh	Y Not	Ringo Starr; Bruce Sugar	2010	
"For Love"	Richard Starkey; Mark Hudson	Liverpool 8	Ringo Starr; Mark Hudson; Dave Stewart	2008	
"Free Drinks"	Richard Starkey; Mark Hudson; Gary Burr; Steve Dudas; Dean Grakal	Choose Love	Mark Hudson; Ringo Starr	2005	
"Free Your Soul" (featuring Dave Koz and José Antonio Rodríguez)	Richard Starkey; Bruce Sugar	EP3 (EP)	Ringo Starr; Bruce Sugar	2022	
"Gave It All Up"	Richard Starkey; Vini Poncia	Ringo the 4th	Arif Mardin	1977	
"Give It a Try"	Richard Starkey; Mark Hudson; Steve Dudas	Liverpool 8	Ringo Starr; Mark Hudson; Dave Stewart	2008	
"Give Me Back the Beat"	Richard Starkey; Mark Hudson; Gary Burr; Steve Dudas; Dean Grakal	Choose Love	Mark Hudson; Ringo Starr	2005	
"Give More Love"	Richard Starkey; Gary Nicholson	Give More Love	Ringo Starr	2017	
"Going Down"	Joe Walsh; Richard Starkey	Old Wave	Joe Walsh	1983	
"Golden Blunders"	Jonathan Auer; Kenneth Stringfellow †	Time Takes Time	Peter Asher	1992	
"Gone Are the Days"	Richard Starkey; Mark Hudson; Dave Stewart	Liverpool 8	Ringo Starr; Mark Hudson; Dave Stewart	2008	
"Gonna Need Someone"	Linda Perry †	Crooked Boy (EP)	Linda Perry	2024	
"Goodnight Vienna (Reprise)"	John Lennon †	Goodnight Vienna	Richard Perry	1974	
"Gotta Get Up to Get Down"	Richard Starkey; Joe Walsh	What's My Name	Ringo Starr	2019	
"Grow Old with Me"	John Lennon †	What's My Name	Ringo Starr	2019	
"Gypsies in Flight"	Richard Starkey; Vini Poncia	Ringo the 4th	Arif Mardin	1977	
"Hard Times"	Peter Skellern †	Bad Boy	Vini Poncia	1978	
"Hard to Be True"	Richard Starkey; Mark Hudson; Gary Burr	Choose Love	Mark Hudson; Ringo Starr	2005	
"Harry's Song"	Richard Starkey; Mark Hudson; Gary Burr; Steve Dudas	Liverpool 8	Ringo Starr; Mark Hudson; Dave Stewart	2008	
"Have I Told You Lately That I Love You?"	Scott Wiseman †	Sentimental Journey	George Martin	1970	
"Have You Seen My Baby"	Randy Newman †	Ringo	Richard Perry	1973	
"Heart on My Sleeve"	Gallagher and Lyle †	Bad Boy	Vini Poncia	1978	
"Here's to the Nights"	Diane Warren †	Zoom In (EP)	Ringo Starr; Bruce Sugar	2020	
"Hey, Would You Hold It Down?"	Roger Miller †	King of the Road: A Tribute to Roger Miller		2018	
"Hey! Baby"	Margaret Cobb; Bruce Channel †	Ringo's Rotogravure	Arif Mardin	1976	
"Hopeless"	Joe Walsh; Richard Starkey	Old Wave	Joe Walsh	1983	
"Husbands and Wives"	Roger Miller †	Goodnight Vienna	Richard Perry	1974	
"I Call Your Name"	John Lennon; Paul McCartney †	– (Note: Recorded for a television special marking the 10th anniversary of John Lennon's death and the 50th anniversary of Lennon's birth. It features a supergroup composed of Lynne, Tom Petty, Joe Walsh and Jim Keltner.)	Jeff Lynne	1990	
"I Don't Believe You"	Andy Sturmer; Roger Manning †	Time Takes Time	Don Was	1992	
"I Don't See Me in Your Eyes Anymore" (Note: Starr based his version on Carl Perkins' 1959 rendition.) (Carl Perkins cover)	Bennie Benjamin; George David Weiss †	Long Long Road	T Bone Burnett	2026	
"I Keep Forgettin'"	Jerry Leiber; Mike Stoller †	Old Wave	Joe Walsh	1983	
"I Live For Your Love" (featuring Molly Tuttle)	T Bone Burnett; Billy Swan †	Look Up	T Bone Burnett; Daniel Tashian; Bruce Sugar	2025	
"I Really Love Her"	Richard Starkey; Mark Hudson	Ringo Rama	Mark Hudson; Ringo Starr	2003	
"I Think Therefore I Rock and Roll"	Richard Starkey; Mark Hudson; Dean Grakal; Paul Santo	Ringo Rama	Mark Hudson; Ringo Starr	2003	
"I Wanna Be Santa Claus"	Richard Starkey; Mark Hudson; Dick Monda	I Wanna Be Santa Claus	Mark Hudson; Ringo Starr	1999	
"I Was Walkin'"	Richard Starkey; Mark Hudson; Dean Grakal	Vertical Man	Mark Hudson; Ringo Starr	1998	
"I Wouldn't Have You Any Other Way"	Chuck Howard †	Beaucoups of Blues	Pete Drake	1970	
"If It's Love That You Want"	Richard Starkey; Mark Hudson; Gary Burr; Steve Dudas	Liverpool 8	Ringo Starr; Mark Hudson; Dave Stewart	2008	
"Imagine Me There"	Richard Starkey; Mark Hudson; Gary Burr	Ringo Rama	Mark Hudson; Ringo Starr	2003	
"In a Heartbeat"	Diane Warren †	Time Takes Time	Don Was	1992	
"In Liverpool"	Richard Starkey; Dave Stewart	Ringo 2012	Ringo Starr	2012	
"In My Car"	Joe Walsh; Richard Starkey; Mo Foster; Kim Goody	Old Wave	Joe Walsh	1983	
"Instant Amnesia"	Richard Starkey; Mark Hudson; Steve Dudas; Dean Grakal	Ringo Rama	Mark Hudson; Ringo Starr	2003	
"Island in the Sun"	Richard Starkey; Todd Rundgren; Richard Page; Steve Lukather; Gregg Rolie; Warren Ham; Gregg Bissonette	Postcards from Paradise	Ringo Starr	2015	
"It Don't Come Easy"	Richard Starkey	Non-album single	George Harrison	1971	
"(It's All Down to) Goodnight Vienna"	John Lennon †	Goodnight Vienna	Richard Perry	1974	
"It's Been Too Long"	T-Bone Burnett; Daniel Tashian †	Long Long Road	T Bone Burnett	2026	
"It's Love"	Dean Grakal; Mark Hudson; Richard Starkey	Non-album single	–	2008	
"It's No Secret"	Richard Starkey; Vini Poncia	Ringo the 4th	Arif Mardin	1977	
"It's Not Love That You Want"	Richard Starkey; Dave Stewart	What's My Name	Ringo Starr	2019	
"I'd Be Talking All the Time"	Chuck Howard; Larry Kingston †	Beaucoups of Blues	Pete Drake	1970	
"I'll Be Fine Anywhere"	Richard Starkey; Mark Hudson; Steve Dudas	Vertical Man	Mark Hudson; Ringo Starr	1998	
"I'll Still Love You"	George Harrison †	Ringo's Rotogravure	Arif Mardin	1976	
"I'm a Fool to Care"	Ted Daffan †	Sentimental Journey	George Martin	1970	
"I'm Home"	Richard Starkey; Mark Hudson; Steve Dudas	Ringo Rama (Deluxe edition)	Mark Hudson; Ringo Starr	2003	
"I'm the Greatest"	John Lennon †	Ringo	Richard Perry	1973	
"I'm Yours"	Richard Starkey; Mark Hudson; Mark Nevin	Vertical Man	Mark Hudson; Ringo Starr	1998	
"Just a Dream"	Richard Starkey; Vini Poncia	B-side to "Wings" and "Drowning in the Sea of Love"	Arif Mardin	1977	
"Just That Way"	Richard Starkey; Bruce Sugar	Change the World (EP)	Ringo Starr; Bruce Sugar	2021	
"King of Broken Hearts"	Richard Starkey; Mark Hudson; Dean Grakal; Steve Dudas	Vertical Man	Mark Hudson; Ringo Starr	1998	
"King of the Kingdom"	Richard Starkey; Van Dyke Parks	Give More Love	Ringo Starr	2017	
"La De Da"	Richard Starkey; Mark Hudson; Dean Grakal; Steve Dudas	Vertical Man	Mark Hudson; Ringo Starr	1998	
"Las Brisas"	Nancy Andrews; Richard Starkey	Ringo's Rotogravure	Arif Mardin	1976	
"Lady Gaye"	Vini Poncia; Richard Starkey; Clifford T. Ward	Ringo's Rotogravure	Arif Mardin	1976	
"Laughable"	Richard Starkey; Peter Frampton	Give More Love	Ringo Starr	2017	
"Lay Down Your Arms" (with Stevie Nicks)	Harry Nilsson †	For the Love of Harry: Everybody Sings Nilsson	Don Was	1995	
"Let Love Lead"	Richard Starkey; Gary Nicholson	Postcards from Paradise	Ringo Starr	2015	
"Let the Rest of the World Go By"	Ernest Ball; Karen Brennan †	Sentimental Journey	George Martin	1970	
"Let's Be Friends"	Bruce Sugar; Sam Hollander †	EP3 (EP)	Ringo Starr; Bruce Sugar	2022	
"Let's Change the World"	Steve Lukather; Joseph Williams †	Change the World (EP)	Ringo Starr; Bruce Sugar	2021	
"Life Is Good"	Richard Starkey; Gary Burr	What's My Name	Ringo Starr	2019	
"Lipstick Traces (on a Cigarette)"	Naomi Neville †	Bad Boy	Vini Poncia	1978	
"The Little Drummer Boy"	Harry Simeone; Henry Onorati; Katherine K. Davis †	I Wanna Be Santa Claus	Mark Hudson; Ringo Starr	1999	
"Liverpool 8"	Richard Starkey; Dave Stewart	Liverpool 8	Ringo Starr; Mark Hudson; Dave Stewart	2008	
"Living in a Pet Shop"	Roger Brown †	Scouse the Mouse	Hugh Murphy	1977	
"Long Long Road"	Richard Starkey; Bruce Sugar †	Long Long Road	T Bone Burnett	2026	
"Look Up" (featuring Molly Tuttle)	T Bone Burnett; Daniel Tashian †	Look Up	T Bone Burnett; Daniel Tashian; Bruce Sugar	2025	
"Loser's Lounge"	Bobby Pierce †	Beaucoups of Blues	Pete Drake	1970	
"Love Don't Last Long"	Chuck Howard †	Beaucoups of Blues	Pete Drake	1970	
"Love First, Ask Questions Later"	Richard Starkey; Mark Hudson; Gary Burr; Dean Grakal	Ringo Rama	Mark Hudson; Ringo Starr	2003	
"Love Is"	Richard Starkey; Mark Hudson; Gary Burr; Steve Dudas	Liverpool 8	Ringo Starr; Mark Hudson; Dave Stewart	2008	
"Love Is a Many Splendoured Thing"	Sammy Fain; Paul Francis Webster †	Sentimental Journey	George Martin	1970	
"Love Me Do"	John Lennon; Paul McCartney †	Vertical Man	Mark Hudson; Ringo Starr	1998	
"Magic"	Richard Starkey; Steve Lukather	What's My Name	Ringo Starr	2019	
"A Man Like Me"	Ruan O'Lochlainn †	Bad Boy	Vini Poncia	1978	
"Me and You"	Richard Starkey; Mark Hudson; Steve Dudas	Choose Love	Mark Hudson; Ringo Starr	2005	
"Memphis in Your Mind"	Richard Starkey; Mark Hudson; Gary Burr; Steve Dudas; Dean Grakal	Ringo Rama	Mark Hudson; Ringo Starr	2003	
"Mindfield"	Richard Starkey; Mark Hudson; Dean Grakal; Steve Dudas	Vertical Man	Mark Hudson; Ringo Starr	1998	
"Missouri Loves Company"	Richard Starkey; Mark Hudson; Steve Dudas; Dean Grakal	Ringo Rama	Mark Hudson; Ringo Starr	2003	
"Miss Jean"	Mike Campbell; Benmont Tench †	Rewind Forward (EP)	Ringo Starr	2023	
"Money"	Janie Bradford; Berry Gordy †	What's My Name	Ringo Starr	2019	
"Monkey See – Monkey Do"	Michael Franks †	Bad Boy	Vini Poncia	1978	
"A Mouse Like Me"	Ruan O'Lochlainn †	Scouse the Mouse	Hugh Murphy	1977	
"Mr. Double-It-Up"	Richard Starkey; Mark Hudson; Steve Dudas; Dean Grakal	Vertical Man (Japanese edition)	Mark Hudson; Ringo Starr	1998	
"My Baby Don't Want Nothing"	T-Bone Burnett †	Long Long Road	T Bone Burnett	2026	
"Mystery of the Night"	Richard Starkey; Richard Marx	Y Not	Ringo Starr; Bruce Sugar	2010	
"Nashville Jam"	Richard Starkey; Chuck Howard; Sorrells Pickard; Jim Buchanan; Charlie Daniels; Pete Drake; D. J. Fontana; Buddy Harman; Grover Lavender; Jerry Kennedy; Junior Huskey; Ben Keith; Dave Kirby; Charlie McCoy; Jerry Reed; George Richey; Jerry Shook	Beaucoups of Blues (1995 reissue)	Pete Drake	1995	
"Never Let Me Go" (featuring Billy Strings)	T Bone Burnett †	Look Up	T Bone Burnett; Daniel Tashian; Bruce Sugar	2025	
"Never Without You"	Richard Starkey; Mark Hudson; Gary Nicholson	Ringo Rama	Mark Hudson; Ringo Starr	2003	
"Night and Day"	Cole Porter †	Sentimental Journey	George Martin	1970	
"No No Song"	Hoyt Axton; David Jackson †	Goodnight Vienna	Richard Perry	1974	
"Nonsense"	Steve Allen †	Alice in Wonderland (1985 film)	–	1985	
"Not Enough Love in This World"	Joseph Williams; Steve Lukather †	Zoom In (EP)	Ringo Starr; Bruce Sugar	2021	
"Not Looking Back"	Richard Starkey; Richard Marx	Postcards from Paradise	Ringo Starr	2015	
"Now That She's Gone Away"	Richard Starkey; Mark Hudson; Gary Burr	Liverpool 8	Ringo Starr; Mark Hudson; Dave Stewart	2008	
"Occapella"	Allen Toussaint †	Goodnight Vienna	Richard Perry	1974	
"Oh My Lord"	Richard Starkey; Mark Hudson; Gary Burr; Steve Dudas; Dean Grakal	Choose Love	Mark Hudson; Ringo Starr	2005	
"Oh My My"	Richard Starkey; Vini Poncia	Ringo	Richard Perry	1973	
"OK Ray"	Richard Starkey; Mark Hudson; Steve Dudas; Hart; Foote	Ringo Rama (Deluxe edition)	Mark Hudson; Ringo Starr	2003	
"Old Time Relovin'"	Vini Poncia; Richard Starkey	Bad Boy	Vini Poncia	1978	
"One"	Richard Starkey; Mark Hudson; Dean Grakal; Steve Dudas	Vertical Man	Mark Hudson; Ringo Starr	1998	
"Only You (And You Alone)"	Buck Ram; Ande Rand †	Goodnight Vienna	Richard Perry	1974	
"Oo-Wee"	Vini Poncia; Richard Starkey †	Goodnight Vienna	Richard Perry	1974	
"The Other Side of Liverpool"	Richard Starkey; Dave Stewart	Y Not	Ringo Starr; Bruce Sugar	2010	
"Out on the Streets"	Richard Starkey; Vini Poncia	Ringo the 4th	Arif Mardin	1977	
"Pasodobles"	Richard Starkey; Mark Hudson; Gary Burr; Steve Dudas; Dean Grakal	Liverpool 8	Ringo Starr; Mark Hudson; Dave Stewart	2008	
"Pax Um Biscum (Peace Be with You)"	Richard Starkey; Mark Hudson; Scott Gordon	I Wanna Be Santa Claus	Mark Hudson; Ringo Starr	1999	
"Peace Dream"	Richard Starkey; Gary Wright; Gary Nicholson	Y Not	Ringo Starr; Bruce Sugar	2010	
"Photograph" (Note: A re-recording featuring Vandaveer appears on Give More Love (2017).)	Richard Starkey; George Harrison	Ringo	Richard Perry	1973	
"Picture Show Life"	John Reid; John Slate †	Old Wave	Joe Walsh	1983	
"Postcards from Paradise"	Richard Starkey; Todd Rundgren	Postcards from Paradise	Ringo Starr	2015	
"Private Property"	Paul McCartney †	Stop and Smell the Roses	Paul McCartney	1981	
"Puppet"	Richard Starkey; Mark Hudson; Steve Dudas	Vertical Man	Mark Hudson; Ringo Starr	1998	
"Pure Gold"	Paul McCartney †	Ringo's Rotogravure	Arif Mardin	1976	
"Really Love You" (Paul McCartney)	Paul McCartney; Richard Starkey	Flaming Pie (Paul McCartney album)	Paul McCartney; Jeff Lynne	1997	
"Red and Black Blues"	Lane Tietgen †	Stop and Smell the Roses (1994 reissue)	Stephen Stills	1994	
"Returning Without Tears"	T-Bone Burnett; Joe Henry †	Long Long Road	T Bone Burnett	2026	
"Rewind Forward"	Richard Starkey; Bruce Sugar	Rewind Forward (EP)	Ringo Starr	2023	
"Right Side of the Road"	Richard Starkey; Richard Marx	Postcards from Paradise	Ringo Starr	2015	
"Rock Around the Clock"	Max C. Freedman; James E. Myers †	Change the World (EP)	Ringo Starr; Bruce Sugar	2021	
"Rock Island Line"	Kelly Pace †	Ringo 2012	Ringo Starr	2012	
"Rory and the Hurricanes"	Richard Starkey; Dave Stewart	Postcards from Paradise	Ringo Starr	2015	
"Rosetta" (featuring Billy Strings & Larkin Poe)	T Bone Burnett †	Look Up	T Bone Burnett; Daniel Tashian; Bruce Sugar	2025	
"Rudolph the Red-Nosed Reindeer"	Johnny Marks †	I Wanna Be Santa Claus	Mark Hudson; Ringo Starr	1999	
"Runaways"	Richard Starkey; Johnny Warman	Time Takes Time	Phil Ramone	1992	
"Running Free"	Roger Brown †	Scouse the Mouse	Hugh Murphy	1977	
"R U Ready?"	Richard Starkey; Mark Hudson; Gary Burr; Steve Dudas	Liverpool 8	Ringo Starr; Mark Hudson; Dave Stewart	2008	
"Samba"	Richard Starkey; Van Dyke Parks	Ringo 2012	Ringo Starr	2012	
"Satisfied"	Richard Starkey; Mark Hudson; Gary Nicholson	Choose Love	Mark Hudson; Ringo Starr	2005	
"Scouse's Dream"	Roger Brown †	Scouse the Mouse	Hugh Murphy	1977	
"Scouse the Mouse"	Roger Brown †	Scouse the Mouse	Hugh Murphy	1977	
"See You Later, Alligator"	Robert Guidry †	Songs from Quarantine Vol. 2	Ringo Starr	2021	
"Send Love Spread Peace"	Richard Starkey; Gary Nicholson	What's My Name	Ringo Starr	2019	
"Sentimental Journey"	Bud Green; Les Brown; Bon Homer †	Sentimental Journey	George Martin	1970	
"Shadows on the Wall"	Steve Lukather; Joseph Williams †	Rewind Forward (EP)	Ringo Starr	2023	
"Silent Homecoming"	Sorrells Pickard †	Beaucoups of Blues	Pete Drake	1970	
"Simple Love Song"	Richard Starkey; Vini Poncia	Ringo the 4th	Arif Mardin	1977	
"Six O'Clock"	Paul McCartney; Linda McCartney †	Ringo	Richard Perry	1973	
"Shake It Up"	Richard Starkey; Gary Nicholson	Give More Love	Ringo Starr	2017	
"She's About a Mover"	Doug Sahm †	Old Wave	Joe Walsh	1983	
"She's Gone"	T-Bone Burnett; Paul Kennerley; Daniel Tashian †	Long Long Road	T Bone Burnett	2026	
"Show Me the Way"	Richard Starkey; Steve Lukather	Give More Love	Ringo Starr	2017	
"Slow Down"	Richard Starkey; Joe Walsh	Ringo 2012	Ringo Starr	2012	
"Sneaking Sally Through the Alley"	Allen Toussaint †	Ringo the 4th	Arif Mardin	1977	
"Snookeroo"	Elton John; Bernie Taupin †	Goodnight Vienna	Richard Perry	1974	
"So Wrong for So Long"	Richard Starkey; Dave Stewart	Give More Love	Ringo Starr	2017	
"Some People"	Richard Starkey; Mark Hudson; Gary Burr; Steve Dudas; Dean Grakal	Choose Love	Mark Hudson; Ringo Starr	2005	
"S.O.S."	Roger Brown †	Scouse the Mouse	Hugh Murphy	1977	
"Speed of Sound"	Richard Starkey; Richard Marx	Give More Love	Ringo Starr	2017	
"Spooky Weirdness"	–	Ringo's Rotogravure	Arif Mardin	1976	
"Standing Still"	Richard Starkey; Gary Burr	Give More Love	Ringo Starr	2017	
"Stardust"	Hoagy Carmichael; Mitchell Parish †	Sentimental Journey	George Martin	1970	
"Step Lightly" (Note: A re-recording appears on Ringo 2012 (2012).)	Richard Starkey	Ringo	Richard Perry	1973	
"Stop and Take the Time to Smell the Roses"	Harry Nilsson; Richard Starkey	Stop and Smell the Roses	Harry Nilsson	1981	
"String Theory" (featuring Molly Tuttle & Larkin Poe)	T Bone Burnett; Daniel Tashian †	Look Up	T Bone Burnett; Daniel Tashian; Bruce Sugar	2025	
"Sun City" (Artists United Against Apartheid)	Steven Van Zandt †	Non-album single	Steven Van Zandt	1985	
"Sunshine Life for Me (Sail Away Raymond)"	George Harrison †	Ringo	Richard Perry	1973	
"Sure to Fall"	Carl Perkins; Quinton Claunch; William Cantrell †	Stop and Smell the Roses	Paul McCartney	1981	
"Tango All Night"	Steve Hague; Tom Seufert †	Ringo the 4th	Arif Mardin	1977	
"Teach Me to Tango"	Richard Starkey; Sam Hollander; Grant Michaels	Zoom In (EP)	Sam Hollander; Grant Michaels	2021	
"Time"	Richard Starkey; Dave Stewart	Y Not	Ringo Starr; Bruce Sugar	2010	
"Time On My Hands"	Daniel Tashian; Paul Kennerley; T Bone Burnett †	Look Up	T Bone Burnett; Daniel Tashian; Bruce Sugar	2024	
"Thank God for Music"	Richard Starkey; Grant Michaels; Sam Hollander	What's My Name	Ringo Starr	2019	
"Thankful" (featuring Alison Krauss)	Richard Starkey; Bruce Sugar	Look Up	Richard Starkey; Bruce Sugar; T Bone Burnett	2025	
"Think About You"	Richard Starkey; Mark Hudson; Gary Burr; Steve Dudas	Liverpool 8	Ringo Starr; Mark Hudson; Dave Stewart	2008	
"Think It Over"	Buddy Holly; Norman Petty †	Ringo 2012	Ringo Starr	2012	
"This Be Called a Song"	Eric Clapton †	Ringo's Rotogravure	Arif Mardin	1976	
"Tonight"	Ian McLagan; John Pidgeon †	Bad Boy	Vini Poncia	1978	
"Touch and Go"	Richard Starkey; Gary Burr	Postcards from Paradise	Ringo Starr	2015	
"Trippin' on My Own Tears"	Richard Starkey; Mark Hudson; Gary Burr; Dean Grakal	Ringo Rama	Mark Hudson; Ringo Starr	2003	
"Tuff Love"	Richard Starkey; Mark Hudson; Gary Burr; Steve Dudas	Liverpool 8	Ringo Starr; Mark Hudson; Dave Stewart	2008	
"The Turnaround"	Richard Starkey; Mark Hudson; Gary Burr; Steve Dudas; Dean Grakal	Choose Love	Mark Hudson; Ringo Starr	2005	
"Vertical Man"	Richard Starkey; Mark Hudson; Dean Grakal; Steve Dudas	Vertical Man	Mark Hudson; Ringo Starr	1998	
"Waiting"	Chuck Howard †	Beaucoups of Blues	Pete Drake	1970	
"Waiting for the Tide to Turn"	Richard Starkey; Bruce Sugar	Zoom In (EP)	Ringo Starr; Bruce Sugar	2021	
"Wake Up"	Richard Starkey	Stop and Smell the Roses (1994 reissue)	Stephen Stills	1994	
"Walk with You" (with Paul McCartney)	Richard Starkey; Van Dyke Parks	Y Not	Ringo Starr; Bruce Sugar	2010	
"We're on the Road Again"	Richard Starkey; Steve Lukather	Give More Love	Ringo Starr	2017	
"Weight of the World"	Brian O'Doherty; Fred Velez †	Time Takes Time	Don Was	1992	
"What Goes Around"	Rick Suchow †	Time Takes Time	Don Was	1992	
"What in the ... World"	Richard Starkey; Mark Hudson; Dean Grakal; Steve Dudas	Vertical Man	Mark Hudson; Ringo Starr	1998	
"What Love Wants to Be"	Richard Starkey; Mark Hudson; Gary Burr	Ringo Rama	Mark Hudson; Ringo Starr	2003	
"What's My Name"	Colin Hay †	What's My Name	Ringo Starr	2019	
"When You Wish Upon a Star" (with Herb Alpert)	Leigh Harline; Ned Washington †	Stay Awake: Various Interpretations of Music from Vintage Disney Films	Hal Willner	1988	
"Where Did Our Love Go"	Eddie Holland; Lamont Dozier; Brian Holland †	Bad Boy	Vini Poncia	1978	
"Whispering Grass (Don't Tell the Trees)"	Fred Fisher; Doris Fisher †	Sentimental Journey	George Martin	1970	
"White Christmas"	Irving Berlin †	I Wanna Be Santa Claus	Mark Hudson; Ringo Starr	1999	
"Who Needs a Heart"	Vini Poncia; Richard Starkey	Bad Boy	Vini Poncia	1978	
"Who's Your Daddy" (with Joss Stone)	Richard Starkey; Joss Stone	Y Not	Ringo Starr; Bruce Sugar	2010	
"Why"	T-Bone Burnett; Daniel Tashian †	Long Long Road	T Bone Burnett	2026	
"Wine, Women and Loud Happy Songs"	Larry Kingston †	Beaucoups of Blues	Pete Drake	1970	
"Wings"	Richard Starkey; Vini Poncia	Ringo the 4th	Arif Mardin	1977	
"Winter Wonderland"	Felix Bernard; Richard B. Smith †	I Wanna Be Santa Claus	Mark Hudson; Ringo Starr	1999	
"Without Her"	Sorrells Pickard †	Beaucoups of Blues	Pete Drake	1970	
"Without Understanding"	Richard Starkey; Mark Hudson; Steve Dudas	Vertical Man	Mark Hudson; Ringo Starr	1998	
"Woman of the Night"	Sorrells Pickard †	Beaucoups of Blues	Pete Drake	1970	
"Wonderful"	Richard Starkey; Gary Nicholson	Ringo 2012	Ringo Starr	2012	
"World Go Round"	Steve Lukather; Joseph Williams †	EP3 (EP)	Ringo Starr; Bruce Sugar	2022	
"Wrack My Brain"	George Harrison †	Stop and Smell the Roses	George Harrison	1981	
"Write One for Me"	Richard Starkey; Mark Hudson; Gary Burr	Ringo Rama	Mark Hudson; Ringo Starr	2003	
"Wrong All the Time"	Richard Starkey; Mark Hudson; Gary Burr	Choose Love	Mark Hudson; Ringo Starr	2005	
"Y Not"	Richard Starkey; Glen Ballard	Y Not	Ringo Starr; Bruce Sugar	2010	
"You and I (Wave of Love)"	Richard Starkey; Bruce Sugar †	Long Long Road	T Bone Burnett	2026	
"You and Me (Babe)"	George Harrison; Mal Evans †	Ringo	Richard Perry	1973	
"You Always Hurt the One You Love"	Allan Roberts; Doris Fisher †	Sentimental Journey	George Martin	1970	
"You Belong to Me"	Pee Wee King; Redd Stewart; Chilton Price †	Stop and Smell the Roses	George Harrison	1981	
"You Bring the Party Down"	Richard Starkey; Steve Lukather	Postcards from Paradise	Ringo Starr	2015	
"You Can't Fight Lightning"	Richard Starkey	Stop and Smell the Roses (1994 reissue)	Paul McCartney	1994	
"You Don't Know Me at All"	Dave Jordan †	Ringo's Rotogravure	Arif Mardin	1976	
"You Never Know"	Steve Dorff; John Bettis †	Curly Sue (soundtrack)	Steve Dorff	1991	
"You Want Some"	Billy Swan †	Look Up	T Bone Burnett; Daniel Tashian; Bruce Sugar	2025	
"You're Sixteen"	Robert B. Sherman; Richard M. Sherman †	Ringo	Richard Perry	1973	
"You've Got a Nice Way"	Stephen Stills; Michael Stergis †	Stop and Smell the Roses	Stephen Stills	1981	
"Zoom In Zoom Out"	Jeff Silbar; Joe Turley †	Zoom In (EP)	Ringo Starr; Bruce Sugar	2021	

== See also ==
- List of songs recorded by the Beatles
