= VH1 Storytellers (Ringo Starr album) =

Live album by Ringo Starr
- Released: 20 October 1998
- Recorded: 13 May 1998
- Genre: Rock
- Length: 51:56
- Label: Mercury
- Producer: Mark Hudson

Ringo Starr chronology
Vertical Man (1998)	VH1 Storytellers (1998)	I Wanna Be Santa Claus (1999)

Professional ratings
Review scores
Source	Rating
AllMusic	3/5 stars
Encyclopedia of Popular Music	2/5 stars
Entertainment Weekly	B
The Rolling Stone Album Guide	3/5 stars

VH1 Storytellers is a live and video album by Ringo Starr recorded and released for the popular music program in 1998. Unlike his previous live recordings, this release places Starr in an intimate environment where, as per the show's requirement, he tells the genesis of the songs being performed.

== Recording ==
Recorded a month before the release of Starr's new studio album Vertical Man – and performed in promotion for it – VH1 Storytellers features Starr's contemporary musical collaborator Mark Hudson (who produced the album) and Starr's current band, dubbed "the Roundheads". Aside from songs that appeared on Vertical Man, much of the set is devoted to Starr's Beatles and early solo successes.

== Release and reception ==
This marked the last time a full length Ringo Starr album was released on cassette in the United States until the 2020s when his EPs Zoom In, Change the World, and EP3 were all issued on the format. However, some countries in the Far East issued cassettes of later Ringo Starr material including Ringo Rama.

VH1 Storytellers was released by Mercury Records in the US on 20 October 1998. (Note: US Mercury 314 538 118-2) The album failed to chart. Entertainment Weekly's reviewer wrote: "It's his yarns, though, that are most engaging … A nice retrospective of an under appreciated composer."

== Track listing ==
No.	Title	Writer(s)	Length
1.	"With a Little Help from My Friends"	Lennon–McCartney	4:18
2.	"It Don't Come Easy"	Richard Starkey	3:18
3.	"I Was Walkin'"	Starkey/Mark Hudson/Dean Grakal	4:21
4.	"Don't Pass Me By"	Starkey	5:40
5.	"Back Off Boogaloo"	Starkey	3:40
6.	"King of Broken Hearts"	Starkey/Hudson/Steve Dudas/Grakal	7:42
7.	"Octopus's Garden"	Starkey	2:51
8.	"Photograph"	Starkey/George Harrison	4:10
9.	"La De Da"	Starkey/Hudson/Dudas/Grakal	5:04
10.	"What in the... World"	Starkey/Hudson/Dudas/Grakal	5:31
11.	"Love Me Do"	Lennon–McCartney	3:42
12.	"With a Little Help from My Friends (Reprise)"	Lennon–McCartney	1:19
13.	"I've Got Blisters..."		0:13
14.	"The End"		0:03

== Personnel ==
- Ringo Starr – lead vocals, drums, piano on "Don't Pass Me By"
- Joe Walsh – guitar, backing vocals
- Mark Hudson – guitar, harmonica, backing vocals
- Gary Burr – guitar, mandolin, backing vocals
- Steve Dudas – guitar
- Jack Blades – bass, backing vocals
- Jim Cox – keyboards, backing vocals
- Scott Gordon – harmonica
- Simon Kirke – drums, percussion
