= Let It Be (song) =

1970 single by The Beatles

- 2011 (restored) US picture sleeve

Single by the Beatles

from the album Let It Be
- B-side: "You Know My Name (Look Up the Number)"
- Released: 6 March 1970
- Recorded: 31 January and 30 April 1969; 4 January 1970
- Studio: Apple and EMI, London
- Genre: Rock; soft rock
- Length: 3:50 (single version); 4:03 (album version)
- Label: Apple
- Songwriter: Lennon–McCartney
- Producer: George Martin (single version): Phil Spector (album version)

The Beatles UK singles chronology
"Something" / "Come Together" (1969)	"Let It Be" (1970)	"Yesterday" (1976)

The Beatles US singles chronology
"Something" / "Come Together" (1969)	"Let It Be" (1970)	"The Long and Winding Road" (1970)

Music video
- "Let It Be" on YouTube

"Let It Be" is a song by the English rock band the Beatles, released on 6 March 1970 as a single, and (in an alternative mix) as the title track of their album Let It Be. It was written and sung by Paul McCartney, and credited to the Lennon–McCartney partnership. The single version of the song, produced by George Martin, features a softer guitar solo and the orchestral section mixed low, compared with the album version, produced by Phil Spector, featuring a more aggressive guitar solo and the orchestral sections mixed higher.

At the time, it had the highest debut on the Billboard Hot 100, beginning its chart run at No. 6, peaking at No. 1 for two weeks in April 1970. It was the Beatles' final single before McCartney announced his departure from the band. Both the Let It Be album and the US single "The Long and Winding Road" were released after McCartney's announced departure from and the subsequent break-up of the group.

== Origin and background ==
Two conflicting explanations exist concerning the origin of the song. McCartney stated that he had the idea of "Let It Be" after he had a dream about his mother Mary Patricia McCartney, who had died of cancer in 1956 when Paul was 14. "It was great to visit with her again. I felt very blessed to have that dream. So that got me writing 'Let It Be'." In a later interview, he said about the dream that his mother had told him, "It will be all right, just let it be." The song is widely interpreted as an allusion to the Virgin Mary, in particular the Annunciation, although McCartney has typically replied that listeners can interpret the song however they like.

Another explanation of the origin of the song was given by the Beatles' road manager Mal Evans, who claimed that McCartney had conceived the song after having a vision of Evans during the group's meditation sessions in India in March 1968. He stated in a 1975 interview with David Frost:

Paul was meditating one day and I came to him in a vision. And I was just standing there saying let it be, let it be, and that's where the song came from. And it's funny, because I drove him home from a session one night, and it was three o'clock in the morning, raining, dark in London, and Paul was telling this, you know, saying I've wrote this song, he told me the instant, the song is gonna be "Brother Malcolm", but uh, I want to change "Brother Malcolm" in case we give the wrong idea!

McCartney first began to play around with "Let It Be" in the recording studio in between takes of "Piggies" on 19 September 1968, during the sessions for The Beatles ("The White Album"). During this rehearsal, he sang "Brother Malcolm" (referring to Evans) instead of "Mother Mary", corroborating Evans' explanation.

In the podcast McCartney: A Life in Lyrics, McCartney reflected that William Shakespeare's Hamlet may have subconsciously inspired "Let It Be". McCartney recalled memorizing Shakespeare passages during his school years, and later having it pointed out to him that in Act 5, Scene 2, as he dies, Hamlet comforts his friend with the words, "But let it be. Horatio, I am dead." McCartney interpreted the line as the playwright's answer to the eternal question posed in the protagonist's earlier soliloquy, "to be or not to be?" He considered whether the phrase may have bubbled up from his subconscious so many years later, as his late mother in a dream, offering him the same comforting advice during a stressful period in his own life.

== Lyrics ==
Jacob Uitti writing for American Songwriter interpreted the lyrics of the song to be McCartney's farewell song to the group expressed through his mixed feelings of sadness for seeing the breakup of the group. The lyrics of the song have three main stanzas of four verses each, with a large number of repetitions of the main chorus sung in minor variations of the repeated lyrics "Let it be, let it be, let it be, let it be/ Whisper words of wisdom, let it be." Uitti presents the opening stanza as stating McCartney's call to his listeners to accept that the reality of the break-up the group needs to be faced squarely using the words:

When I find myself in times of trouble, Mother Mary comes to me
Speaking words of wisdom, let it be
And in my hour of darkness she is standing right in front of me
Speaking words of wisdom, let it be

Uitti states that the second main stanza indicates McCartney's restatement of the reality of the group break-up though, in the second stanza, he indicates a possible getting together for the group in the future with the words:

And when the broken-hearted people living in the world agree
There will be an answer, let it be
For though they may be parted, there is still a chance that they will see
There will be an answer, let it be

The contemplated reunion for McCartney never took place before Lennon's death in 1980, in spite of the hope McCartney expressed in the closing third major stanza (from around 1970) reflecting on the promise which 'the sound of music' holds for his sentiments about the group disbanding and possibly eventually reuniting in the future.

== Recordings ==
"Let It Be" (1970)
23-second sample from "Let It Be"

The song would be rehearsed properly at Twickenham Film Studios on 3 January 1969, where the group had, the previous day, begun what would become the Let It Be film. During this stage of the film they were only recording on the mono decks used for syncing to the film cameras, and were not making multi-track recordings for release. A single take was recorded, with just McCartney on piano and vocals. The first attempt with the other Beatles was made on 8 January. Work continued on the song throughout the month. Multi-track recordings commenced on 23 January at Apple Studios.

The master take was recorded on 31 January 1969, as part of the "Apple studio performance" for the project. McCartney played a Blüthner piano, Lennon played six-string electric bass (replaced by McCartney's own bass part on the final version at the behest of George Martin), George Harrison and Ringo Starr assumed their conventional roles, on guitar and drums respectively, and Billy Preston contributed on Hammond organ. This was one of two suitable performances of "Let It Be" recorded that day. The first version, designated take 27-A, would serve as the basis for all officially released versions of the song. The other version, take 27-B, was included in the film Let It Be as part of the Apple studio performance along with "Two of Us" and "The Long and Winding Road".

Before 2021, the film performance of "Let It Be" was never officially released as an audio recording. The lyrics in the two versions differ a little in the last verse. The studio version has mother Mary comes to me ... speaking words of wisdom, whereas the film version has mother Mary comes to me ... there will be no sorrow. In addition, McCartney's vocal performance is noticeably different in both versions: in the film version, it sounds rough in certain moments since he is not using anti-pop on his mic; there are also a couple of falsetto vocals performed by him (extending the vocal 'e' on the word 'be'), for instance in the 'let it be' line that precedes the second chorus. Finally, the instrumental progression featured in the middle of the song after the second chorus (that descends from F to C), which is played twice on all released studio versions, is played (or at least is shown being played) only once in the film. A new mix of the take used in the film was included as "Take 28" on the 2021 Super Deluxe edition of the album Let It Be.

On 30 April 1969, Harrison overdubbed a new guitar solo on the best take from 31 January. He overdubbed another solo on 4 January 1970. The first overdub solo was used for the original single release, and the second overdub solo was used for the original album release. Some fans mistakenly believe that there were two versions of the basic track – based mostly on the different guitar solos, but also on other differences in overdubs and mixes.

McCartney sent a demo of this song to Jerry Wexler in late 1969 and he passed along the recording to Aretha Franklin, whose version came out in January 1970, as the first release of "Let It Be".

=== Single version ===
The single used the same cover photographs as the Let It Be album, and was originally released on 6 March 1970, backed by "You Know My Name (Look Up the Number)", with a production credit for George Martin. This version includes orchestration and backing vocals overdubbed on 4 January 1970, under the supervision of Martin and McCartney, with backing vocals that included the only known contribution by Linda McCartney to a Beatles song. It was during this same session that Harrison recorded the second overdubbed guitar solo. The intention at one point was to have the two overdub solos playing together. This idea was dropped for the final mix of the single, and only the 30 April solo was used, although the 4 January overdub can be heard faintly during the final verse. Martin mixed the orchestration very low in this version.

The single mix made its album debut on the Beatles' 1967–1970 compilation album. Original pressings erroneously show the running time of 4:01 (from the Let It Be album), and not the single version's running time of 3:52. This version was also included on 20 Greatest Hits, Past Masters Volume 2 and 1.

The Let It Be EP (1972 Melodiya) was the Beatles' first release in the Soviet Union. The 3-track 7-inch vinyl EP, M62-36715/6, also included "Across the Universe" and "I Me Mine".

=== Album version ===
On 26 March 1970, Phil Spector remixed the song for the Let It Be album. This version features Harrison's second guitar solo overdub, fewer backing vocals, a delay effect on Starr's hi-hat, and more prominent orchestration. The final chorus has three "let it be ..." lines, as the "there will be an answer" line is repeated twice (instead of once as on the single) before the "whisper words of wisdom" line to close the song. On the album, as the preceding track "Dig It" ends, Lennon is heard saying in a falsetto voice, mimicking Gracie Fields: "That was 'Can You Dig It' by Georgie Wood, and now we'd like to do 'Hark, the Angels Come'."

=== Anthology version ===
A previously unreleased January 1969 take of the song (recorded before the master), without heavy production, appeared on Anthology 3 in 1996. This version, take 1, was recorded on 25 January 1969. It is a much simpler version, as McCartney had not written the final verse yet ("And when the night is cloudy ... I wake up to the sound of music ..."). Instead, the first verse is repeated. The track, as released on Anthology 3 also features studio talk between Lennon and McCartney prior to a 31 January 1969 take:

Lennon: Are we supposed to giggle in the solo?
McCartney: Yeah.
Lennon: OK.
McCartney: This'll – this is gonna knock you out, boy.

Also, at the end of the song on the Anthology 3 version, Lennon can be heard saying, following another 31 January take, "I think that was rather grand. I'd take one home with me. OK let's track it. (Gasps) You bounder, you cheat!" (This is a reference to the no-overdub policy that the Beatles had adopted for the Get Back project – "tracking" refers to double tracking the vocals on a recording.) The running time of the Anthology version is 4:05.

=== Let It Be... Naked version ===
Still another version of the song appeared on the Let It Be... Naked album in 2003. The majority of this remix is take 27-A from 31 January 1969, with parts of take 27-B (as used in the film Let It Be), including the subdued guitar solo, spliced in.

This version contains a piano track different from the one on the studio and single versions. This piano track was taken in part from take 28 which was subsequently released and can be heard on the Super Deluxe re-release of the Let It Be album in 2021. In the intro, McCartney plays an extra A bass note during the A minor chord (very similar to the way he plays the intro in the film version); he also plays a standard A minor chord in the piano at the first beat of measure two in the last verse (on the lyric "mother", also like in the film version), while the other versions have a different piano harmonisation which can be easily interpreted as an unfixed mistake. The backing vocals in the chorus of this version are similar to those in the single version, but are significantly reduced in volume while still retaining a reverb-heavy, choral effect. Ringo Starr disliked Phil Spector's version where Starr's drumming was augmented by Spector's "tape-delay-effect" to his hi-hats during the song's second verse and added shakers, so Let It Be... Naked features his original "stripped-down-approach" drumming. Also departed were the tom-tom overdub rolls, heard after the guitar solo during the third verse. Starr also commented that after the release of Naked, he would now have to listen to McCartney saying, "I told you so", when talking about Spector's production. The song's running time on Let It Be... Naked is 3:52.

=== Glyn Johns mixes ===
Glyn Johns mixed the song on 28 May 1969 as he finished the mixing for the Get Back album. This version was not released at the time. He used the same mix on 5 January 1970, which was an attempt to compile an acceptable version of the LP; this version best exemplifies Glyn's drum recording techniques. Again, this version of the LP was never officially released. The 1969 Glyn Johns version of the LP was included in the 2021 "Super Deluxe" release of Let It Be.

== Critical reception ==
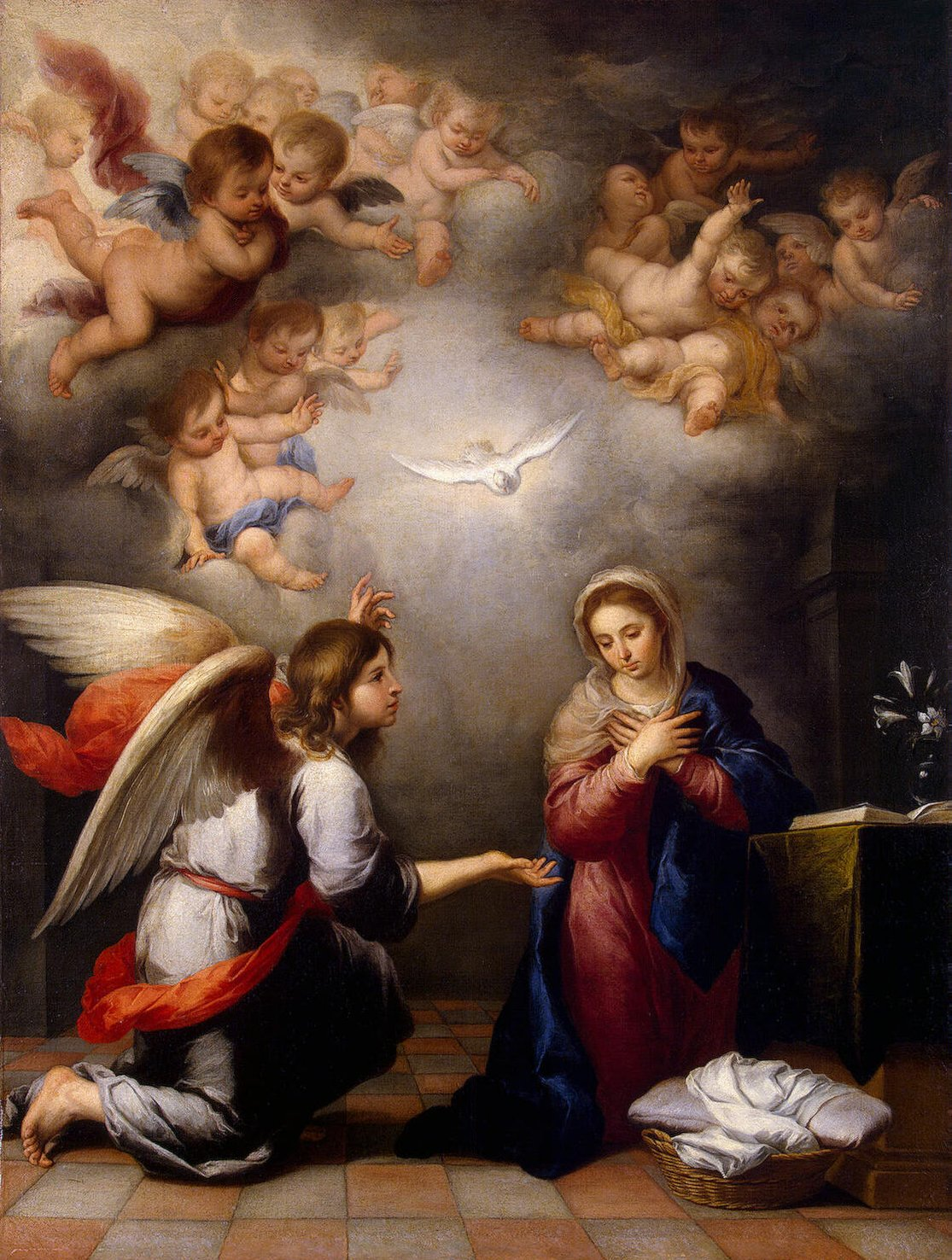
Though widely interpreted to be an allusion to the Virgin Mary, McCartney has typically replied that listeners can interpret the song however they like.

In his review of the single, for the NME, Derek Johnson admired McCartney's performance and the lyrics' "pseudo-religious" qualities. Although he considered that the melody paled beside some of the band's previous singles, Johnson added: "As ever with The Beatles, this is a record to stop you dead in your tracks and compel you to listen attentively." John Gabree of High Fidelity magazine found the lyrics "dangerous politically", but viewed the song as possibly "the best thing musically that McCartney has done". In his album review for Melody Maker, Richard Williams said that McCartney's compositions "seem to be getting looser and less concise" and added that, although the album version of "Let It Be" featured a "much harder guitar solo" than the single, the song "still doesn't have enough substance to become a McCartney standard".

AllMusic critic Richie Unterberger describes "Let It Be" as one of "the Beatles' most popular and finest ballads". In Ian MacDonald's view, the song "achieved a popularity well out of proportion to its artistic weight" and it was "'Hey Jude', without the musical and emotional release". Former Creem critic Richard Riegel included it on his 1996 list of the ten most overrated Beatles tracks, saying that, like Simon & Garfunkel's "Bridge over Troubled Water", the song "cater[ed] to the lowest-common-denominator emotional stasis of its listeners. 'Let It Be' left the Beatles no artistic choice but dissolution."

Lennon also commented disparagingly on "Let It Be". In his 1980 Playboy interview, he disavowed any involvement with composing the song, saying: "That's Paul. What can you say? Nothing to do with the Beatles. It could've been Wings. I don't know what he's thinking when he writes 'Let It Be'."

"Let It Be" was ranked number 2 on CILQ-FM's 2000 list of the "Top 500 Pure Rock Songs Of The Century". In 2004, the song was included on Grammy Hall of Fame. Mojo magazine ranked "Let It Be" at number 50 in its 2006 list of "The 101 Greatest Beatles Songs". In a similar list compiled in 2010, Rolling Stone placed it at number 8. The magazine also ranked the track at number 20 on its 500 Greatest Songs of All Time list. "Let It Be" holds the top spot on "The Fans' Top 10" poll included in The 100 Best Beatles Songs: An Informed Fan's Guide by Stephen J. Spignesi and Michael Lewis. The song is ranked third on the 100 Best Beatles Songs list, behind "A Day in the Life" and "Strawberry Fields Forever", and continues to bring about numerous pop culture references.

== Music video ==
On 10 May 2024, a new official music video for the song was released on the band's YouTube channel, featuring clips from the 1970 film Let It Be.

== Personnel ==
According to John Winn's That Magic Feeling, Mark Lewisohn's The Complete Beatles Chronicle and Steve Sullivan's Encyclopedia of Great Popular Song Recordings, Volume 1:

The Beatles

- Paul McCartney – lead and backing vocals, piano, maracas, electric piano, bass guitar
- John Lennon – backing vocals
- George Harrison – lead guitars, backing vocals
- Ringo Starr – drums

Additional musicians

- Linda McCartney – backing vocals
- Billy Preston – Hammond organ
- George Martin – string and brass arrangements
- Unknown session musicians – orchestration

== Charts ==
=== Weekly charts ===
1970 weekly chart performance for "Let It Be"
Chart (1970)	Peak position
Australia (Kent Music Report)	1
Austria (Ö3 Austria Top 40)	1
Belgium (Ultratop 50 Flanders)	3
Canada Top Singles (RPM)	1
Finland (Suomen virallinen lista)	6
France (SNEP)	1
Hungary (Rádiós Top 40)	1
Indonesia (Aktuil)	3
Ireland (IRMA)	3
Italy (Musica e Dischi)	1
Netherlands (Dutch Top 40)	1
Netherlands (Single Top 100)	1
New Zealand (Listener)	1
Norway (VG-lista)	1
Sweden (Kvällstoppen)	3
Sweden (Tio i Topp)	6
Switzerland (Schweizer Hitparade)	1
UK Singles (Official Charts)	2
US Billboard Hot 100	1
US Adult Contemporary (Billboard)	1
West Germany (Musikmarkt)	2

2010 weekly chart performance for "Let It Be"
Chart (2010)	Peak position
Finland (Suomen virallinen lista)	20
Spain (Promusicae)	39
US Billboard Hot 100 Recurrents	1

2013 weekly chart performance for "Let It Be"
Chart (2013)	Peak position
France (SNEP)	96

2016 weekly chart performance for "Let It Be"
Chart (2016)	Peak position
Sweden (Sverigetopplistan)	39

2019 weekly chart performance for "Let It Be"
Chart (2019)	Peak position
US Hot Rock & Alternative Songs (Billboard)	12

=== Year-end charts ===
Year-end chart performance for "Let It Be"
Chart (1970)	Rank
Austria (Ö3 Austria Top 40)	4
Belgium (Ultratop Flanders)	44
Canada Top Singles (RPM)	3
Netherlands (Dutch Top 40)	39
Netherlands (Single Top 100)	25
Switzerland (Schweizer Hitparade)	4
US Billboard Hot 100	9
US Adult Contemporary (Billboard)	8
West Germany (Official German Charts)	6

== Certifications ==
Certifications for "Let It Be"
Region	Certification	Certified units/sales
Brazil (Pro-Música Brasil)	Gold	30,000^{‡}
Denmark (IFPI Danmark)	Platinum	90,000^{‡}
France (SNEP) 2020 release	Gold	100,000^{‡}
Germany (BVMI)	Gold	250,000^{‡}
Italy (FIMI)	Platinum	70,000^{‡}
New Zealand (RMNZ)	3× Platinum	90,000^{‡}
Spain (Promusicae)	Platinum	60,000^{‡}
United Kingdom (BPI)	2× Platinum	1,200,000^{‡}
United States (RIAA)	2× Platinum	2,000,000^{^}
^{^} Shipments figures based on certification alone.^{‡} Sales+streaming figures based on certification alone.

== Ferry Aid version ==
"Let It Be"

Single by Ferry Aid
- B-side: "Let It Be (The Gospel Jam mix)"; "Let It Be (Mega Message mix)"
- Released: 23 March 1987
- Recorded: 31 January 1969; 15–17 March 1987
- Genre: Pop
- Length: 6:08
- Label: CBS
- Songwriter: Lennon–McCartney
- Producer: Stock Aitken Waterman

In 1987, the song was recorded by charity supergroup Ferry Aid (which included McCartney). It reached number one on the UK singles chart for three weeks and reached the top ten in many other European countries. McCartney's verse used the original take from the Beatles' "Let It Be" sessions. Ferry Aid covered "Let It Be" as a charity single to raise money for victims of the Zeebrugge Disaster. The featured artists included McCartney, Boy George, Mark Knopfler and Kate Bush, as well as an ensemble chorus made up of media personalities and other musicians. Although McCartney's contribution was taken from the Beatles' recording, he filmed a segment of himself singing to the track for inclusion in the music video. The single topped the UK singles chart for three weeks and was certified gold for shipping more than 500,000 copies. It was also a number 1 hit in Norway and Switzerland.

=== Track listings ===
7-inch single

1. "Let It Be" – 6:08
2. "Let It Be" (The Gospel Jam mix) – 2:50

=== Charts ===
==== Weekly charts ====
Weekly chart performance for the Ferry Aid version
Chart (1987)	Peak position
Austria (Ö3 Austria Top 40)	4
Belgium (Ultratop 50 Flanders)	3
Denmark (IFPI)	1
France (SNEP)	8
Italy (Musica e dischi)	1
Italy Airplay (Music & Media)	3
Netherlands (Dutch Top 40)	3
Netherlands (Single Top 100)	4
New Zealand (Recorded Music NZ)	4
Norway (VG-lista)	1
Sweden (Sverigetopplistan)	9
Switzerland (Schweizer Hitparade)	1
UK Singles (Official Charts)	1
West Germany (GfK)	3

==== Year-end charts ====
1987 year-end chart performance for the Ferry Aid version
Chart (1987)	Position
Belgium (Ultratop Flanders)	53
Netherlands (Dutch Top 40)	34
Netherlands (Single Top 100)	28
Norway Spring Period (VG-Lista)	1
Switzerland (Schweizer Hitparade)	6
UK Singles (Gallup)	13
West Germany (Official German Charts)	46

== Dolly Parton version ==
"Let It Be"

Single by Dolly Parton featuring Paul McCartney and Ringo Starr

from the album Rockstar
- Released: 18 August 2023
- Genre: Rock
- Length: 4:28
- Label: Butterfly
- Songwriter: Lennon–McCartney
- Producers: Dolly Parton; Don Miggs; Kent Wells; Mick Fleetwood

Dolly Parton singles chronology
"We Are the Champions/We Will Rock You" (2023)	"Let It Be" (2023)	"What's Up?" (2023)

Paul McCartney singles chronology
"Say Say Say" (2023)	"Let It Be" (2023)	"Days We Left Behind" (2026)

Ringo Starr singles chronology
"Everyone and Everything" (2022)	"Let It Be" (2023)	"Rewind Forward" (2023)

A Dolly Parton cover of "Let It Be" featuring Paul McCartney and Ringo Starr and contributions from Peter Frampton and Mick Fleetwood was released as a single on 18 August 2023 from Parton's album Rockstar (2023). Parton's "Let It Be" marked the first time that two former Beatles were listed as separate artists on the same charting song.

=== Personnel ===
Credits adapted from Tidal.

Associated performers

- Dane Bryant – strings, Wurlitzer organ
- Gary Lunn – bass
- Jennifer O'Brien – background vocalist
- Jerry McPherson – electric guitar
- Jimmy Mattingly – cello, viola, violin
- Mike Rojas – Hammond B3
- Nir Z – percussion
- Paul McCartney – piano, vocals
- Peter Frampton – electric guitar
- Richard Dennison – background vocalist
- Ringo Starr – drums
- Rob Mcnelley – electric guitar
- Vicki Hampton – background vocalist

Production

- Dolly Parton – producer, executive producer
- Don Miggs – producer, additional producer
- Mick Fleetwood – producer, additional producer

Studio personnel

- Kent Wells – producer, editor, engineer
- Brian Judd – additional engineer
- Christine Winslow – assistant recording engineer
- Chris Latham – editor
- Joel Mckenny – editor, engineer
- Kyle Dickinson – editor, engineer
- Kevin Willis – engineer
- Mark Needham – engineer
- Chris Lord-Alge – mastering engineer

=== Charts ===
Weekly chart performance for the Dolly Parton version
Chart (2023)	Peak position
UK Singles Sales (OCC)	66
UK Singles Downloads (Official Charts)	61
US Digital Song Sales (Billboard)	22
US Rock Digital Song Sales (Billboard)	2

== Sources ==
- The Beatles Anthology, Episode 8 (DVD). EMI. 2003. Event occurs at 0:53:40.
- "The Beatles, Let it Be... Naked". The Observer Music Monthly. London. 19 October 2003.
- The Beatles (2000). Anthology. Chronicle Books. ISBN 0-8118-2684-8.
- Calkin, Graham (2000). "Let It Be".
- "Let It Be". Sold on Song. 2009.
- Let It Be... Naked (Media notes). The Beatles. Apple Records. 2003.
- Levine, Robert (14 December 2003). "Letting 'Let It Be' Be: McCartney Wins". The New York Times.
- Lewisohn, Mark (1988). The Beatles Recording Sessions. New York: Harmony Books. ISBN 0-517-57066-1.
- Lewisohn, Mark (1996). The Complete Beatles Chronicle. Chancellor Press. ISBN 0-7607-0327-2.
- "Linda McCartney farewell celebrates her passions". CNN. 8 June 1998.
- MacDonald, Ian (1994). Revolution in the Head: the Beatles' Records and the Sixties. New York: Henry Holt and Company. ISBN 0-8050-2780-7.
- MacDonald, Ian (2005). Revolution in the Head: The Beatles' Records and the Sixties (Second Revised ed.). London: Pimlico (Rand). ISBN 1-84413-828-3.
- "McCartney plays Red Square". BBC News. 24 May 2003.
- Miles, Barry (1997). Many Years From Now. Vintage-Random House. ISBN 0-7493-8658-4.
- "Overview of The Singer". AllMusic. 2009.
- Pollack, Alan W. (1995). "Let It Be". Notes on Series. Archived from the original on 27 June 2008.
- "The RS 500 Greatest Songs of All Time". Rolling Stone. 9 December 2004. Archived from the original on 26 June 2008.
- "The RS 100 Greatest Beatles Songs of All Time". Rolling Stone. 30 August 2010. Archived from the original on 28 August 2010.
- Sheff, David (2000). All We Are Saying: The Last Major Interview with John Lennon and Yoko Ono (Paperback). St. Martin's Griffin. ISBN 0-312-25464-4.
- Spitz, Bob (2005). The Beatles. Little Brown. ISBN 0-316-80352-9.
- Sulpy, Doug; Schweighardt, Ray (1999). Get Back: The Unauthorized Chronicle of The Beatles' Let It Be Disaster. New York, NY: St. Martin's Griffin. ISBN 0-312-19981-3.
- Unterberger, Richie (2009). "Review of "Let It Be"". AllMusic.
- Wexler, Jerry (2007). Rare and Unreleased Recordings from the Golden Reign of the Queen of Soul (booklet). Aretha Franklin.
- Whitburn, Joel (1996). The Billboard Book of Top 40 Hits (6th ed.). Billboard Books. ISBN 9780823076321.
- Winn, John C. (2009). That Magic Feeling: The Beatles' Recorded Legacy, Volume Two, 1966–1970. New York, NY: Three Rivers Press. ISBN 978-0-307-45239-9.
