= Liverpool 8 =

Studio album by Ringo Starr
- Released: 14 January 2008
- Recorded: 2006–2007
- Studio: Roccabella, UK; Whatinthewhatthe?, Los Angeles
- Genre: Rock
- Length: 45:28
- Label: Capitol
- Producer: Ringo Starr; Mark Hudson; Dave Stewart

Ringo Starr chronology
Ringo Starr: Live at Soundstage (2007)	Liverpool 8 (2008)	Ringo 5.1: The Surround Sound Collection (2008)

Singles from Liverpool 8
- 1. "Liverpool 8" Released: 4 December 2007

Liverpool 8 is the fifteenth studio album by Ringo Starr, released worldwide on 14 January 2008. Received with mixed reviews, it marked Starr's return to EMI for the first time since leaving the label in 1975, following the end of the Beatles' recording contract with the company.

== Background ==
Liverpool 8 was originally planned for release in June 2007, and began as another production by the collaborative team of Mark Hudson and Starr (the two had previously co-produced Vertical Man, I Wanna Be Santa Claus, VH1 Storytellers, Ringo Rama, and Choose Love). However, the release date was pushed back to the beginning of 2008 when Hudson was replaced by Dave Stewart after a falling out with Starr. The album's production credits read, "Produced by Ringo Starr and Mark Hudson; Re-Produced by Ringo Starr and David Stewart."

All of the songs but one were written with the Roundheads, although Stewart also has two co-writing credits. Starr's attorney Bruce Grakal told journalist Peter Palmiere that the partnership between Hudson and Starr was over and they would never work together again. This happened after Hudson dropped out of Starr's 2006 tour as musical director to do the television special The One: Making a Music Star. According to Palmiere, Hudson claimed that the split was over Starr's insistence on using synthesized sounds, for which Stewart is known, whereas Hudson wanted real guitars, pianos, strings etc. However, concerning the parting of ways with Hudson, Starr commented, "The separation between Mark Hudson and myself was a question of trust and friendship and had nothing to do with synthesizers."

== Release ==
Liverpool 8 was released worldwide by Capitol Records. The title refers to the postal district of the Toxteth area of Liverpool in which Starr was born. The album was released on CD, MP3, and USB Wristband. It was available as a free audio stream at www.vh1classic.com before its release date. The title track was released on CD and digital download as the first single from the album on 7 January 2008. Liverpool 8 entered the UK Album Chart at number 91, and reached a peak of number 94 in the US. The album sold 7,000 copies within the first week of release and as of January 2010, 31,000 copies have been sold.

A few weeks later after the album release, readers of the New York Daily News were offered a non-album track called "It's Love", which was recorded during the sessions for Liverpool 8.

== Reception ==
Professional ratings
Aggregate scores
Source	Rating
Metacritic	59/100
Review scores
Source	Rating
about.com	4/5 stars
AllMusic	3/5 stars
Billboard	(favourable)
The Music Box	3.5/5 stars
The Phoenix	2/4 stars
PopMatters	6/10 stars
Record Collector	2/5 stars
Rolling Stone	3.5/5 stars
The Times	2/5 stars
Uncut	3/5 stars

Liverpool 8 has a 59 per cent "mixed or average" rating from Metacritic. Billboard gave the album a positive review, calling it "full of nostalgia for the good ol' days". Stephen Thomas Erlewine of AllMusic writes that "it's nothing too flashy and it has not one tune that calls attention to itself". In a particularly unfavourable review for The Times, Pete Paphides wrote that "it’s hard not to boggle at Liverpool's susceptibility to flattery", and "Just because [the album] was fun to make, it doesn’t follow that you might enjoy listening to it."

== Track listing ==
All tracks written by Ringo Starr, Mark Hudson, Gary Burr and Steve Dudas except where noted.

No.	Title	Length
1.	"Liverpool 8" (Richard Starkey, David A. Stewart)	4:51
2.	"Think About You"	3:40
3.	"For Love" (Starkey, Hudson)	3:49
4.	"Now That She's Gone Away" (Starkey, Hudson, Burr)	3:02
5.	"Gone Are the Days" (Starkey, Hudson, Stewart)	2:49
6.	"Give It a Try" (Starkey, Hudson, Dudas)	3:26
7.	"Tuff Love"	4:33
8.	"Harry's Song"	4:00
9.	"Pasodobles" (Starkey, Hudson, Burr, Dudas, Dean Grakal)	4:17
10.	"If It's Love That You Want"	3:06
11.	"Love Is"	3:52
12.	"R U Ready"	3:59

== Personnel ==
Personnel per booklet.

Musicians

- Ringo Starr – drums (1–12), vocals (1–12), percussion (1–7, 9–11), backing vocals (1), claps (1), organ (10)
- Sean Hurley – bass (1–2, 4–7)
- David A. Stewart – electric guitar (1–5, 12), guitar solo (1, 3, 12), acoustic guitar (1–2, 12), orchestra arrangement (1), slide guitar (12)
- Gary Burr – backing vocals (1–2, 4–10, 12), claps (1), electric guitar (2, 4, 7–8, 10–11), guitar solo (4, 8, 12), acoustic guitar (6, 9, 12), whistle (8), keyboards (4, 11), mandolin (12)
- Steve Dudas – backing vocals (1), claps (1), electric guitar (2–6, 8, 10–11),guitar solo (2, 8–12), classical guitar (9), acoustic guitar (12)
- Brent Carpenter – backing vocals, claps (1)
- Mark Hudson – backing vocals (1–12), claps (1), bass (3, 9–12), electric guitar (3, 5), guitar solo (3–4), piano (3, 7), keyboards (3, 5), acoustic guitar (4, 8, 11), bongos (6), harmonica (6), mellotron (11)
- Bruce Sugar – backing vocals, claps (1)
- Keith Allison – backing vocals, claps (1)
- Suzie Katayama – orchestra arrangement, conductor (1, 11)
- Zac Rae – keyboards (2–5)
- Dave Way – bass (3)
- Jesse Davey – electric guitar
Production
- Ringo Starr – producer
- Mark Hudson – producer (except on "Liverpool 8")
- David A. Stewart – producer on "Liverpool 8"
- Mark Hudson – additional production
- Ringo Starr, David A. Stewart – re-producers
- Bruce Sugar – engineer
- Steve Dudas, Gary Burr, Ned Douglas – additional engineers
- Bill Malina – mixing
- Ted Jensen – mastering
- Tom Recchion – art direction
- Paul Moore – design
- Brian Griffin – photography

== Charts ==
Chart (2008)	Peak position
Austrian Albums (Ö3 Austria)	71
French Albums (SNEP)	181
German Albums (Offizielle Top 100)	94
Japanese Albums (Oricon)	207
Swedish Albums (Sverigetopplistan)	53
US Billboard 200	94
UK Albums (OCC)	91
