= Look Up (Ringo Starr album) =

Studio album by Ringo Starr
- Released: 10 January 2025
- Recorded: November 2023 - January 2024, March - July 2024
- Studio: Roccabella West; East Iris Studios; Sound Emporium Studios; Royal Plum Studio
- Genre: Country
- Length: 36:57
- Label: UM^{e}
- Producer: T Bone Burnett; Daniel Tashian; Bruce Sugar

Ringo Starr chronology
Crooked Boy (2024)	Look Up (2025)	Long Long Road (2026)

Singles from Look Up
- 1. "Time on My Hands" Released: 18 October 2024; 2. "Thankful" Released: 15 November 2024; 3. "Look Up" Released: 15 January 2025

Look Up is the twenty-first studio album by English singer-songwriter Ringo Starr. It was released on 10 January 2025 through Universal Music Enterprises. After a series of five extended plays from 2021 to 2024, Look Up is his first studio album since What's My Name (2019). A country music album, it features guest appearances from Billy Strings, Molly Tuttle, Lucius, and Larkin Poe, as well as writing and production contributions from T Bone Burnett. The album peaked at number one on the UK Country album chart and number 147 on the Billboard 200.

== Background ==
In November 2022, Burnett and Starr both attended a book launch held by Olivia Harrison in Los Angeles. There, Starr asked Burnett to write a song for the drummer's upcoming EP. After agreeing, Burnett wrote "Come Back" and presented it to Starr as a demo in February of the next year. The song went unused until fall of 2023, when Starr contacted Burnett and informed him of his plans to record a country EP. Starr recorded three more country influenced tracks to accompany "Come Back", and nearly finished the EP, until deciding to take more Burnett songs into consideration for inclusion. In March 2024, Burnett presented Starr with eight more country tracks to choose from for inclusion on the EP, and when Ringo expressed his enjoyment for all tracks, he decided to turn the project into a full length album.

== Recording ==
Proper recording began at Starr's home studio, Roccabella West, in early March 2024. These sessions consisted of Ringo overdubbing drum and vocal tracks on top of demos recorded by Burnett in Nashville, Tennessee from November 2023 through January 2024. Recording at Roccabella continued until May, when all of Starr's overdubs were completed. Further overdubs were recorded over the next two months in multiple studios throughout Nashville, involving numerous country musicians, such as Billy Strings, Larkin Pow, Lucius, Molly Tuttle, and Paul Franklin. The album was then mixed over the course of five days in late July.

== Reception ==
Professional ratings
Aggregate scores
Source	Rating
Metacritic	72/100
Review scores
Source	Rating
AllMusic	4/5 stars
Clash	8/10
Classic Rock	3.5/5 stars
Paste	7/10
Pitchfork	6.3/10
Record Collector	4/5 stars
Rolling Stone	3.5/5 stars
Sputnikmusic	2.8/5
The Line of Best Fit	6/10
The Telegraph	3/5 stars

Ben Cardew of Pitchfork reviewed the album and gave it a 6.3 rating. He described it as having a modern production, solid "drumming" and "full of wonderfully sensitive touches". Emma Harrison of Clash wrote that the album "feels contemporary and energised with thoughtful lyrics that showcase his warm vocals" and "different from anything he has done before," giving it an 8/10 rating. Rolling Stone's Rob Sheffield called the album "the sound of Ringo being himself, the least jaded rock star in the universe, which is exactly what we want from this wise old sage", rating it 3.5 out of 5.

== Track listing ==
All tracks are written by T Bone Burnett, except where noted.

Look Up track listing
No.	Title	Writer(s)	Length
1.	"Breathless" (featuring Billy Strings)		3:02
2.	"Look Up" (featuring Molly Tuttle)	Burnett; Daniel Tashian	3:10
3.	"Time on My Hands"	Burnett; Tashian; Paul Kennerley	3:59
4.	"Never Let Me Go" (featuring Billy Strings)		3:55
5.	"I Live for Your Love" (featuring Molly Tuttle)	Burnett; Bill Swan	2:59
6.	"Come Back" (featuring Lucius)		2:49
7.	"Can You Hear Me Call" (featuring Molly Tuttle)		2:54
8.	"Rosetta" (featuring Billy Strings and Larkin Poe)		3:46
9.	"You Want Some"	Swan	3:03
10.	"String Theory" (featuring Molly Tuttle and Larkin Poe)	Burnett; Tashian	3:37
11.	"Thankful" (featuring Alison Krauss)	Bruce Sugar; Richard Starkey	3:38
Total length:			36:57

== Personnel ==
=== Musicians ===
- Ringo Starr – drums, lead vocals, percussion (1), whistling (6)
- T Bone Burnett – electric guitar (1, 2, 4, 7–11), acoustic guitar (1, 4, 6, 8), 6-string bass (2, 3)
- Dennis Crouch – bass
- Daniel Tashian – acoustic guitar (1–3, 10), electric guitar (2–4, 9, 11), woodblock (2), 6-string bass (3), piano (3), 12 string lead guitar (10), harmony vocals (11)
- Billy Strings – harmony vocal (1, 4, 8), lead acoustic guitar (1), guitars (4), electric guitar (8)
- Paul Franklin – pedal steel guitar (2, 3, 5, 9–11)
- Molly Tuttle – harmony vocal (2, 5, 10), duet vocal (7), acoustic guitar (5, 7), mandolin (5), 12-string guitar (10)
- Andy Cata – piano (3)
- David Mansfield – string arrangement (3)
- Mickey Raphael – harmonica (4)
- Mike Rojas – piano (5)
- Colin Linden – resonator guitar (6)
- Stuart Duncan – fiddle, mandolin (6)
- Rory Hoffman – acoustic guitar (6), clarinet (9)
- Lucius (Jess Wolfe & Holly Laessig) – background vocals (6)
- Joe Walsh – slide guitar (8)
- Rebecca Lovell – mandolin (8), background vocals (8, 10)
- Megan Lovell – background vocals (8, 10)
- Greg Leisz – acoustic guitars (11)
- Alison Krauss – harmony vocal (11)

=== Technical ===
- Bruce Sugar – production, engineering
- Daniel Tashian – production
- T Bone Burnett – production
- Gavin Lurssen – mastering
- Reuben Cohen – mastering
- Michael Piersante – mixing, engineering
- Mike Stankiwicz – engineering
- Eddie Roberts – additional engineering, engineering assistance
- David Paulin – engineering assistance
- Grant Wilson – engineering assistance
- Joanna Finley – engineering assistance
- Karl Wingate – engineering assistance
- Michelle Freetly – engineering assistance
- Ivy Skoff – production coordination

== Charts ==
Chart performance for Look Up
Chart (2025)	Peak position
Austrian Albums (Ö3 Austria)	14
Belgian Albums (Ultratop Flanders)	63
German Albums (Offizielle Top 100)	14
Japanese Albums (Oricon)	35
Scottish Albums (OCC)	5
Spanish Albums (PROMUSICAE)	54
Swiss Albums (Schweizer Hitparade)	7
UK Albums (OCC)	79
UK Americana Albums (OCC)	1
UK Country Albums (OCC)	1
US Billboard 200	147
US Americana/Folk Albums (Billboard)	12
US Top Country Albums (Billboard)	27
US Top Rock & Alternative Albums (Billboard)	30
