= Give More Love =

Studio album by Ringo Starr
- Released: 15 September 2017
- Recorded: 2017
- Studios: Roccabella West, Los Angeles; Fred's Kitchen, Stockholm
- Genres: Pop rock; country; reggae
- Length: 38:16
- Label: UM^{e}
- Producer: Ringo Starr

Ringo Starr chronology
Postcards from Paradise (2015)	Give More Love (2017)	What's My Name (2019)

Singles from Give More Love
- 1. "Give More Love" Released: 7 July 2017; 2. "We're on the Road Again" Released: 28 July 2017; 3. "So Wrong for So Long" Released: 18 August 2017; 4. "Standing Still" Released: 8 September 2017

Give More Love is the nineteenth studio album by English musician and former Beatles drummer Ringo Starr. It was recorded primarily in Starr's home studio in Los Angeles and was released on 15 September 2017 by UM^{e}. The album features Starr's frequent collaborators such as Joe Walsh, Dave Stewart, Gary Nicholson and Bob Malone, members of his All-Starr Band, and guest appearances by Starr's former Beatles bandmate Paul McCartney.

== Background ==
Starr began working on the album following the release of Postcards from Paradise and a tour with his All-Starr Band. Starr initially recruited longtime collaborator David A. Stewart to help him produce a country album in Nashville, but ultimately ended up recording mostly rock tracks in his home studio. The album features a number of Starr's regular collaborators, including former and current All-Starr band members Steve Lukather, Peter Frampton, Joe Walsh, Edgar Winter and Timothy B. Schmit.

Starr's former Beatles bandmate Paul McCartney plays bass on two tracks and sings backing vocals. Starr announced McCartney's appearance on the album via Twitter.

The album consists of ten new original tracks and four bonus tracks; the bonus tracks are all re-recordings of songs previously released by Starr. The re-recording of Starr's 1972 single "Back Off Boogaloo" is based on Starr's original demo of the song and features Electric Light Orchestra founder Jeff Lynne and Eagles member Joe Walsh on guitar. The re-recording of "You Can't Fight Lightning" from Stop and Smell the Roses features the Swedish band Alberta Cross, and the re-recordings of Starr's song "Photograph" and his Beatles song "Don't Pass Me By" feature the American band Vandaveer.

Starr officially announced the album on 7 July 2017, his 77th birthday, and simultaneously released the title track as a single via streaming services and digital download. "We're on the Road Again", featuring McCartney, Lukather, Walsh and Winter, was released as a second single on 18 July. The country track "So Wrong for So Long" was released as a single on 18 August. "Standing Still" was released as the final single on 8 September.

== Release and reception ==
Professional ratings
Aggregate scores
Source	Rating
Metacritic	55/100
Review scores
Source	Rating
AllMusic	3/5 stars
Rolling Stone	3/5 stars
The Times	2/5 stars
Express & Star	7/10

Give More Love received mixed reviews upon its release. Rolling Stone's Will Hermes described Starr as "rock's mischievously minimalist id and Eternal-Optimist Emeritus", and called the album "a well-timed all-star candygram". AllMusic's Stephen Thomas Erlewine wrote "this isn't the kind of album that plays its cards close to the vest; as the title suggests, this is open-hearted, kind music." The album also featured guest appearances from several musicians, reflecting Starr's collaborations with other artists during its recording.

== Track listing ==
No.	Title	Writer(s)	Length
1.	"We're on the Road Again"	Richard Starkey; Steve Lukather	4:24
2.	"Laughable"	Starkey; Peter Frampton	2:58
3.	"Show Me the Way"	Starkey; Lukather	4:42
4.	"Speed of Sound"	Starkey; Richard Marx	3:46
5.	"Standing Still"	Starkey; Gary Burr	3:06
6.	"King of the Kingdom"	Starkey; Van Dyke Parks	4:36
7.	"Electricity"	Starkey; Glen Ballard	3:38
8.	"So Wrong for So Long"	Starkey; Dave Stewart	4:03
9.	"Shake It Up"	Starkey; Gary Nicholson	3:02
10.	"Give More Love"	Starkey; Nicholson	4:01
Total length:			38:16

Bonus tracks
No.	Title	Writer(s)	Length
11.	"Back Off Boogaloo"	Starkey; George Harrison	2:55
12.	"Don't Pass Me By" (featuring Vandaveer)	Starkey	3:38
13.	"You Can't Fight Lightning" (featuring Alberta Cross)	Starkey	4:21
14.	"Photograph" (featuring Vandaveer)	Starkey; Harrison	3:35
Total length:			52:45

== Personnel ==
- Ringo Starr – vocals, percussion (1–11), drums (1–4, 6–11), guitar (11), piano (12), production, mixing
- Steve Lukather – guitar (1, 3–4), keyboards (1, 3), backing vocals (1)
- Joe Walsh – guitar (7, 11), backing vocals (1)
- Peter Frampton – guitar (2, 4), backing vocals (2)
- Greg Leisz – guitar (5, 8)
- Steve Dudas – guitar (5–6, 9–10)
- David A. Stewart – guitar (6, 8)
- Gary Nicholson – guitar (9)
- Jeff Lynne – guitar (11)
- Petter Ericson Stakee – guitar (13), backing vocals (13), percussion (13)
- Matthew Pynn – guitar (13)
- J. Tom Hnatow – guitar (12, 14)
- Mark Charles Heidinger – guitar (12, 14), bass (12, 14), vocals (12, 14)
- Paul McCartney – bass (1, 3), backing vocals (1)
- Nathan East – bass (4–6, 8, 11)
- Don Was – bass (7, 9)
- Matt Bissonette – bass (10)
- Erik MacQueen – bass (13)
- Jim Cox – keyboards (8, 10), piano (1), organ (3)
- Benmont Tench – keyboards (2, 7)
- Edgar Winter – piano (9), saxophone (6), backing vocals (1)
- Glen Ballard – keyboards (7), backing vocals (7)
- Bob Malone – piano (11)
- Fredrik Aspelin – drums (13), percussion (13)
- Robby Cosenza – drums (12, 14), percussion (12, 14), harmonica (12)
- Bruce Sugar – drum programming (5), keyboards (6); recording, mixing, editing
- Gregg Bissonette – percussion (10)
- Timothy B. Schmit – backing vocals (2–3, 10)
- Richard Page – backing vocals (2–3, 10)
- Amy Keys – backing vocals (2–4, 6–7, 9–10)
- Windy Wagner – backing vocals (4, 6–7, 9)
- Gary Burr – backing vocals (5, 8), guitar (5)
- Georgia Middleman – backing vocals (5, 8)
- Rose Guerin – vocals (12, 14)
- Viktor Buck – backing vocals (13); engineering (13)
- Fred Appelquist – engineering (13)
- Peter R. Ericson – additional production (13)
- Duane Lundy – additional engineering & production (21)

== Charts ==
Chart (2017)	Peak position
Austrian Albums (Ö3 Austria)	65
Belgian Albums (Ultratop Flanders)	94
Belgian Albums (Ultratop Wallonia)	43
Czech Albums (ČNS IFPI)	18
French Albums (SNEP)	49
German Albums (Offizielle Top 100)	69
Japanese Albums (Oricon)	68
Scottish Albums (Official Charts)	76
Spanish Albums (Promusicae)	71
Swiss Albums (Schweizer Hitparade)	51
US Billboard 200	128
US Top Rock Albums (Billboard)	25
US Indie Store Album Sales (Billboard)	10
