= Rewind Forward =

2023 EP by Ringo Starr

EP by Ringo Starr
- Released: 13 October 2023
- Studio: Roccabella West
- Genre: Rock
- Length: 14:50
- Label: Universal Music Enterprises
- Producer: Ringo Starr

Ringo Starr chronology
EP3 (2022)	Rewind Forward (2023)	Crooked Boy (2024)

Singles from Rewind Forward
- 1. "Rewind Forward" Released: 25 August 2023

"I've loved EPs since they first came out in the ’60s. And then I heard the kids are making EPs and thought, 'That's good!'"

— Starr on recording a series of EPs

Rewind Forward is the fourth extended play (EP) by English singer-songwriter Ringo Starr, released on CD, cassette, 10" vinyl and digital platforms on 13 October 2023. It includes the song "Feeling the Sunlight", written by Paul McCartney.

== Composition ==
Starr wrote the EP's title track with engineer and frequent co-writer Bruce Sugar, and stated: "We've been writing a song now for every EP." The opening track on the EP, "Shadows on the Wall", was written by Steve Lukather and Joseph Williams, members of Starr's All-Starr Band and members of the rock band Toto. Paul McCartney, formerly a member of the Beatles alongside Starr, wrote the track "Feeling the Sunlight". The final track on the EP, "Miss Jean", was written by former Tom Petty and the Heartbreakers members Benmont Tench and Mike Campbell, along with Ian Hunter.

Regarding the EP's title, Starr stated:

"Rewind Forward" was something I said out of the blue — it's just one of those lines like "A Hard Day's Night". It just came to me. But it doesn't really make sense. I was trying to explain it to myself and the best I can tell you about what it means is: Sometimes when you want to go forward you have to go back first.

== Recording ==
Recording sessions mainly occurred in 2023. "Shadows on the Wall", "Rewind Forward" and "Miss Jean" were recorded at Starr's home studio in Los Angeles, California, while "Feeling the Sunlight" was primarily recorded in the UK.

== Track listing ==
Track listing for Rewind Forward
No.	Title	Writer(s)	Length
1.	"Shadows on the Wall"	Steve Lukather; Joseph Williams	3:30
2.	"Feeling the Sunlight"	Paul McCartney	3:06
3.	"Rewind Forward"	Richard Starkey; Bruce Sugar	3:30
4.	"Miss Jean"	Mike Campbell; Benmont Tench	4:44
Total length:			14:50

== Personnel ==
- Ringo Starr – vocals, drums, percussion (all tracks)
- Steve Lukather – guitar (1)
- Joseph Williams – backing vocals (1)
- Torrance Klein – bass guitar (1)
- Paul McCartney – backing vocals, bass guitar, electric guitar, keyboards, zither (2)
- Bruce Sugar – keyboards (3)
- Joe Walsh, Steve Dudas – guitar (3)
- Kipp Lennon, Marky Lennon – backing vocals (3)
- Matt Bissonette – bass guitar (3)
- Mike Campbell – backing vocals, guitar (both on 4)
- Benmont Tench – piano (4)
- Lance Morrison – bass guitar (4)

== Charts ==
Chart performance for Rewind Forward
Chart (2023)	Peak position
Austrian Albums (Ö3 Austria)	64
Japanese Hot Albums (Billboard Japan)	67
Swiss Albums (Schweizer Hitparade)	35
