= Change the World (Ringo Starr EP) =

EP by Ringo Starr
- Released: 24 September 2021
- Studio: Roccabella West Studios
- Genre: Rock
- Length: 13:19
- Label: Universal Music Enterprises
- Producer: Ringo Starr; Bruce Sugar; Linda Perry

Ringo Starr chronology
Zoom In (2021)	Change the World (2021)	EP3 (2022)

Professional ratings
Review scores
Source	Rating
i	3/5 stars

Change the World is the second extended play (EP) by English singer-songwriter Ringo Starr, released on 24 September 2021 by Universal Music Enterprises. It was produced by Starr and Bruce Sugar, except for "Coming Undone", which was produced by the pair along with Linda Perry, who also wrote the track.

== Track listing ==
Change the World track listing
No.	Title	Writer(s)	Length
1.	"Let's Change the World"	Steve Lukather, Joseph Williams	4:14
2.	"Just That Way"	Richard Starkey, Bruce Sugar	3:29
3.	"Coming Undone" (featuring Trombone Shorty)	Linda Perry	3:20
4.	"Rock Around the Clock"	Max C. Freedman, James E. Myers	2:14
Total length:			13:19

== Personnel ==
- Drums, Percussion, Vocals – Ringo Starr
- Guitar – Steve Lukather (1), Joe Walsh (4)
- Acoustic Guitar, Bass, Percussion, Backing Vocals - Linda Perry (3)
- Acoustic Bass – Nathan East (4)
- Piano – Bruce Sugar (2, 4)
- Trumpet, Trombone, Horns arrangements - Troy Andrews
- Backing Vocals – Amy Keys, Darryl Phinnessee, Windy Wagner

== Production ==
- Co-producers – Bruce Sugar (1, 2, 4), Linda Perry (3)
- Creative Director – Vartan (4)
- Design – Scott Richie
- Mastered By – Gavin Lurssen
- Photography By – Scott Richie

== Charts ==
Weekly chart performance of Change the World
Chart (2021)	Peak position
Austrian Albums (Ö3 Austria)	51
Swiss Albums (Schweizer Hitparade)	56
US Top Album Sales (Billboard)	29
