= Liverpool 8 (song) =

Single by Ringo Starr

from the album Liverpool 8
- B-side: "For Love"
- Released: 4 December 2007 (download); 7 January 2008 (7", CD)
- Genre: Rock
- Length: 4:51
- Label: Capitol
- Songwriter(s): Richard Starkey, Dave Stewart
- Producer(s): Dave Stewart, Ringo Starr

Ringo Starr singles chronology
"Never Without You" (2003)	"Liverpool 8" (2007)	"Walk with You" (2009)

"Liverpool 8" is a song by Ringo Starr and is the lead track on his 2008 album of the same name. The song was also released in early December 2007 as a download-single. It was later released in physical formats (7" single and CD single) on 7 January 2008, a week before the release of the album. The B-side for the 7" is the third track from the album, "For Love". Despite the physical single being available for only 99 pence in the UK, it only reached number 99 there.

The song is an autobiography of Starr put to song, with emphasis on his time with the Beatles. The title refers to the postal district of the Dingle area of Liverpool in which Starr was born. The single was initially produced by Starr and Mark Hudson, a long-time collaborator of Starr. When Hudson was fired by the former Beatle, Dave Stewart was hired to help finish both the single and the studio album.

== Track listings ==
- Download, CD CDLIV8
1. "Liverpool 8"
- Red vinyl 7" LIV8
1. "Liverpool 8"
2. "For Love"

== Personnel ==
Personnel are taken from the Liverpool 8 single CD liner notes.

- Ringo Starr – drums, lead vocal and backing vocals
- Sean Hurley – bass
- David Stewart – electric and acoustic guitars
- Brent Carpenter, Bruce Sugar, Keith Allison, Mark Hudson and Steve Dudas – backing vocals
