= What's My Name (Ringo Starr album) =

Studio album by Ringo Starr
- Released: 25 October 2019
- Recorded: 2019
- Studio: Roccabella West, Los Angeles
- Genre: Rock
- Length: 34:00
- Label: UM^{e}
- Producer: Ringo Starr

Ringo Starr chronology
Give More Love (2017)	What's My Name (2019)	Zoom In (2021)

Singles from What's My Name
- 1. "What's My Name" Released: 23 September 2019

What's My Name is the twentieth studio album by English singer-songwriter Ringo Starr. It was released on 25 October 2019 through Roccabella and Universal Music Enterprises. The album was again recorded at Roccabella West, Starr's home studio, and features collaborations with Joe Walsh, Benmont Tench, Edgar Winter, Steve Lukather, Richard Page, and Warren Ham. It also includes a cover of John Lennon's "Grow Old with Me", on which Starr invited Paul McCartney to sing and play bass guitar, and a solo version by Starr of "Money (That's What I Want)", a Motown song previously recorded by the Beatles.

== Writing and recording ==
Several of the tracks were written with previous collaborators based around comments Starr has made. "What's My Name", the title track and first single, was composed by Colin Hay, and comes from a chant Starr has used in concert. Starr co-wrote "Gotta Get Up to Get Down" with his brother-in-law Joe Walsh after a comment Starr made at a dinner they had with Klaus Voormann, while Starr composed "Thank God for Music" with Sam Hollander, who then wrote "Better Days" on his own based on an interview Starr gave to Rolling Stone. The song "Magic" is a collaboration with Steve Lukather, whom Starr has worked with on his two previous studio albums.

The album was recorded in Los Angeles at Starr's home studio, Roccabella West, with Starr saying that he did not "want to be in an old-fashioned recording studio anymore" and that he had "had enough of the big glass wall and the separation", saying recording at his home has been good for himself "and the music". Starr decided to record a cover of John Lennon's "Grow Old with Me", a song recorded during the Bermuda sessions for Lennon's Double Fantasy (1980), after meeting producer Jack Douglas by chance. Douglas, who had produced Double Fantasy, asked Starr if he had listened to the Bermuda recording sessions, and supplied them to Starr when he mentioned he had not. Starr was impressed by the song, and decided to record his own version. Starr asked Paul McCartney to perform on the track. The song's string arrangement incorporates a motif from the George Harrison-penned song "Here Comes the Sun", giving all four Beatles a presence on the recording. McCartney, Harrison, and Starr briefly considered recording "Grow Old With Me" as part of the mid-1990s Anthology reunion and archival projects; it was one of four songs included on a cassette tape given by Yoko Ono to McCartney, Harrison, and Starr. Starr's cover of "Money (That's What I Want)", recorded before the "Grow Old with Me" cover was envisioned, was an attempt to create a modern version different from the Motown original and the Beatles' 1963 cover. The recording incorporates the use of autotune on Starr's voice.

== Release and reception ==
Professional ratings
Aggregate scores
Source	Rating
Metacritic	61/100
Review scores
Source	Rating
AllMusic	3/5 stars
NME	3/5 stars

What's My Name was released on 25 October 2019. It received mixed reviews upon its release. NME's Rhian Daly commented that the album "dares you to continue listening, to see if you can make it through its first song without spontaneously combusting from second-hand embarrassment, a spectral groan of “Grandaaad” escaping from your ashes as they sizzle and singe." AllMusic's Stephen Thomas Erlewine commented that "the spirits are sunny and the songs tuneful, it's hard not to find What's My Name ingratiating, even though much of the album is so good-intentioned, it's silly."

In a positive review, Mark Smotroff of Audiophile Review felt that What's My Name described the record as "a lot of fun to listen to, one of the hallmarks of the best Ringo records", praising the album's "celebratory party-like modern indie rock flavor". Smotroff, similar to Rolling Stone reviewer Brenna Ehrlich, praised the record's ensemble of veteran performers "comfortab[ly] doing what they do together", and being "the sound of a klatch of seasoned performers letting loose". Ehrlich felt the fun nature of the album was essential to how a quality Ringo Starr record should be. Several reviewers such as NME cited Starr's cover of "Grow Old with Me" to be the highlight of the record.

== Track listing ==
No.	Title	Writer(s)	Length
1.	"Gotta Get Up to Get Down"	Richard Starkey; Joe Walsh	4:20
2.	"It's Not Love That You Want"	Starkey; Dave Stewart	3:34
3.	"Grow Old With Me"	John Lennon	3:18
4.	"Magic"	Starkey; Steve Lukather	4:09
5.	"Money (That's What I Want)"	Janie Bradford; Berry Gordy	2:56
6.	"Better Days"	Sam Hollander	2:50
7.	"Life Is Good"	Starkey; Gary Burr	3:10
8.	"Thank God for Music"	Starkey; Grant Michaels; Hollander	3:38
9.	"Send Love Spread Peace"	Starkey; Gary Nicholson	2:58
10.	"What's My Name"	Colin Hay	3:45
Total length:			34:00

== Personnel ==
- Ringo Starr – lead vocals, drums, percussion
- Joe Walsh – guitar (1, 3), backing vocals, rapping (1)
- Colin Hay – guitar and backing vocals (10)
- David A. Stewart – guitar (2)
- Steve Lukather – guitar (4)
- Pete Min, Steve Dudas – guitar
- Paul McCartney – bass guitar and backing vocals (3)
- John Pierce – bass guitar
- Kaveh Rastegar – bass guitar
- Nathan East – bass guitar
- Edgar Winter – clavinet, synthesizer, backing vocals (1)
- Benmont Tench – clavinet (2), organ (7), organ and piano (9)
- Grant Michaels – piano
- Jim Cox – piano
- Peter Levin – organ
- Bruce Sugar – synthesizer, horns, piano, organ, backing vocals
- Allison Lovejoy – accordion
- Warren Ham – harmonica
- Jack Douglas – string arrangement (3)
- Kari Kimmel, Richard Page, Warren Ham, Windy Wagner – backing vocals (4)

== Charts ==
Chart (2019)	Peak position
Austrian Albums (Ö3 Austria)	43
Belgian Albums (Ultratop Flanders)	121
Czech Albums (ČNS IFPI)	34
French Albums (SNEP)	128
German Albums (Offizielle Top 100)	40
Japan Hot Albums (Billboard Japan)	98
Japanese Albums (Oricon)	49
Scottish Albums (OCC)	43
Spanish Albums (PROMUSICAE)	39
Swiss Albums (Schweizer Hitparade)	50
UK Albums (OCC)	99
US Billboard 200	127
