= Scouse the Mouse =

1977 studio album by various artists

Studio album by Various artists
- Released: 9 December 1977
- Recorded: July 1977
- Genre: Children's music
- Length: 50:51
- Label: Polydor
- Producer: Hugh Murphy

Scouse the Mouse is a children's album released in the UK in 1977. It featured the vocals of Ringo Starr and others.

== Story and recording ==
Starr appears as the album's main character, Scouse the Mouse, who emigrates from Liverpool to the United States. Scouse is a word for things from Liverpool. Other characters are played by Adam Faith (“Bonce the Mouse”) and Barbara Dickson (“Molly Jolly”). The album was written, directed and narrated by Donald Pleasence. Most of the songs performed on the album were composed by Roger Brown.

Starr's tracks ("I Know a Place", "S.O.S.", "A Mouse Like Me", "Living in a Pet Shop", "Scouse's Dream", "Running Free", "Boat Ride" and "Scouse the Mouse") were recorded in July 1977, produced by Hugh Murphy, at Berwick Street Studios.

== Release ==
An animated television version of the story was planned for airing on ITV, but it was delayed due to a strike and ultimately shelved.

Scouse the Mouse was released on 9 December 1977 in the UK by Polydor. (Note: UK Polydor Super 2480 429) The album, which was the third and final release in Starr's three-album deal with Polydor Records, was not issued in the United States.

== Track listing ==
All tracks are written by Roger Brown, except where noted.

No.	Title	Writer(s)	Lead vocals	Length
1.	"Living in a Pet Shop"		Ringo Starr	4:03
2.	"Sing a Song for the Tragopan"	Brown, D. Pleasence	Barbara Dickson	3:16
3.	"Scouse's Dream"		Ringo Starr	3:38
4.	"Snow Up Your Nose for Christmas"	M. Pleasence, D. Pleasence	Ben Chatterly	3:47
5.	"Running Free"		Ringo Starr	3:21
6.	"America (A Mouse's Dream)"		Adam Faith	3:40
7.	"Scousey"		Lucy Pleasence	3:25
8.	"Boat Ride"		Ringo Starr	3:56
9.	"Scouse the Mouse"		Ringo Starr	2:50
10.	"Passenger Pigeon"	Brown, D. Pleasence	Barbara Dickson	1:25
11.	"I Know a Place"	Brown, O'Lachlainn, D. Pleasence	Polly Pleasence, Ringo Starr	4:25
12.	"Caterwaul"	Jim Parker		2:04
13.	"S.O.S."		Ringo Starr	2:42
14.	"Ask Louey"	Brown, D. Pleasence	Rick Jones	3:57
15.	"A Mouse Like Me"	O'Lachlainn	Ringo Starr	4:22
