= Crooked Boy =

2024 EP by Ringo Starr

EP by Ringo Starr
- Released: 26 April 2024
- Studio: Greenleaf; Roccabella West
- Genre: Rock
- Length: 12:13
- Label: Roccabella
- Producer: Linda Perry

Ringo Starr chronology
Rewind Forward (2023)	Crooked Boy (2024)	Look Up (2025)

Singles from Crooked Boy
- 1. "February Sky" Released: 12 April 2024

Crooked Boy is the fifth extended play (EP) by the English musician Ringo Starr, released on 26 April 2024. Linda Perry wrote and produced all four songs, with "February Sky" chosen as the lead single.

== Release and reception ==
"We called her, and I asked her has she got a track, and she said, 'yeah,' and then I called her, and she said, 'yeah'. And then she said, 'Why don't you let me do an EP on you?' And I said, 'yeah.' And she's done a great job."

– Ringo Starr

Ahead of the release of the EP, Starr and Perry appeared at an Amoeba Music in Hollywood. While there, Starr elaborated on the production of Crooked Boy, stating: The EP also features guitarist Nick Valensi, primarily known as a member of the Strokes. It was initially released as a limited edition coloured vinyl on Record Store Day 2024. It was then released in digital format on April 26, 2024, and in CD and vinyl form on May 31. The first single, "February Sky", described as an "uplifting song" by Rolling Stone while Starr personally referred to the song as 'great – very moody', was released on April 12. All tracks were written and produced by Linda Perry, with vocals and drums from Starr. A tour with his All Starr Band took place in the fall.

== Track listing ==
All tracks are written by Linda Perry.

Crooked Boy track listing
No.	Title	Length
1.	"February Sky"	3:18
2.	"Adeline"	2:41
3.	"Gonna Need Someone"	3:00
4.	"Crooked Boy"	3:12
Total length:		12:12

== Personnel ==
Credits adapted from the EP's liner notes.

- Ringo Starr – lead vocals and drums (all tracks)
- Linda Perry – bass, guitar, and Hammond B-3 organ (1); acoustic guitar (2); backing vocals (1–3)
- Chris Price – bass guitar (3, 4); keyboards and backing vocals (3)
- Nick Valensi – guitar (all tracks)
- Josh Gooch – guitar (all tracks)
- Damon Fox – mellotron and keyboards (2)
- Billy Mohler – bass guitar (2)
- Eli Pearl – additional guitar (2)
- Barclay Moffitt – saxophone (2, 4)
- Paul Nelson – trombone (2, 4)
- Aaron Janik – trumpet (2, 4)

Production

- Linda Perry – production and engineering
- Jim Schultz – mixing
- Emily Lazar – mastering
- Bruce Sugar – drum recording
- Kii Arens – artwork
- Harry Benson – photography

== Chart performance ==
In the United Kingdom, the title track Crooked Boy entered the Official Charts' Singles Sales chart at number 26, remaining on the chart for one week.

The song also reached number two on the Physical Singles Chart, remaining on the list for a total of eleven weeks. On the Vinyl Singles Chart, it peaked at number three, lasting a total of six weeks on that chart.

Chart performance for Crooked Boy
Chart (2024)	Peak position
Austrian Albums (Ö3 Austria)	56
