= Zoom In =

EP by Ringo Starr
- Released: 19 March 2021
- Recorded: 2020
- Studio: Roccabella West, Beverly Hills, California, US
- Genre: Rock
- Length: 19:19
- Label: Universal Music Enterprises
- Producer: Ringo Starr; Bruce Sugar; Sam Hollander and Grant Michaels (on "Teach Me to Tango")

Ringo Starr chronology
| What's My Name (2019) | Zoom In (2021) | Change the World (2021) |

Singles from Zoom In
- 1. "Here's to the Nights" Released: 16 December 2020; 2. "Zoom In Zoom Out" Released: 12 March 2021

Zoom In is the first extended play (EP) by English singer-songwriter Ringo Starr, released on 19 March 2021 by Universal Music Enterprises. Zoom In is Starr's first EP to consist entirely of original music, and began a flurry of Starr's EP releases in the 2020s. It was produced by Starr and co-produced by Bruce Sugar, except for "Teach Me to Tango," which was produced by Sam Hollander and co-produced by Grant Michaels.

== Critical reception ==
Professional ratings
Aggregate scores
| Source | Rating |
|---|---|
| Metacritic | 53/100 |
Review scores
| Source | Rating |
| AllMusic | 3/5 stars |
| American Songwriter | 3/5 stars |
| Classic Rock | 3.5/5 stars |
| The Independent | 1/5 stars |
| NME | 3/5 stars |

Zoom In received mixed reviews from critics. At Metacritic, which assigns a normalised rating out of 100 to reviews from critics, the album received an average score of 53, indicating "mixed or average reviews," based on five reviews. Classic Rock Magazine gave the EP a 70/100, appreciating its production quality and reflective themes. NME reviewer El Hunt gave the EP three stars, commenting, "for all its flaws, this is a hard record to hate. It’s also nice to hear that, instead of moaning about being caged in a massive mansion, this celebrity is focusing on lifting the rest of us up instead."

In a one-star review for The Independent, Rachel Brodsky described the record as "an overstuffed pillow of an EP" that "seeks to calm all of the world's aches but just ends up sounding schmaltzy and smothering." Brodsky criticized the song "Waiting for the Tide to Turn," calling Starr's interpretation "so cut-and-paste two-dimensional, all good intentions are lost," and lamented that "slapping peace signs on everything is about as helpful as a black Instagram box with PR-approved copy from an advertising agency."

== Track listing ==
Zoom In track listing
| No. | Title | Writer(s) | Length |
|---|---|---|---|
| 1. | "Here's to the Nights" | Diane Warren | 4:05 |
| 2. | "Zoom In Zoom Out" | Jeff Silbar; Joe Turley | 3:57 |
| 3. | "Teach Me to Tango" | Ringo Starr; Sam Hollander; Grant Michaels | 3:07 |
| 4. | "Waiting for the Tide to Turn" | Bruce Sugar; Starr | 3:54 |
| 5. | "Not Enough Love in the World" | Joseph Williams; Steve Lukather | 4:16 |
| Total length: | | | 19:19 |

== Personnel ==
Credits adapted from the liner notes of the physical release of Zoom In.

- Ringo Starr – drums, percussion, vocals on all tracks

"Here's to the Nights"

- Charlie Bisharat – violin
- Jacob Braun – cello
- Jim Cox – string arrangements, synth strings
- Nathan East – bass
- Steve Lukather – guitar
- Bruce Sugar – synth guitar
- Benmont Tench – piano
- Guest vocals: Paul McCartney, Joe Walsh, Sheryl Crow, Jenny Lewis, Lenny Kravitz, Chris Stapleton, Yola, Ben Harper, Dave Grohl, Finneas O'Connell, Eric Burton, Corinne Bailey Rae

"Zoom In Zoom Out"

- Sam Hollander, Amy Keys, Windy Wagner – backing vocals
- Robby Krieger – guitar
- Hal Rosenfeld – percussion
- Jeff Silbar – bass, guitar
- Benmont Tench – piano, organ

"Teach Me to Tango"

- Zelma Davis, Charity Daw, Candace Devine – backing vocals
- Josh Edmondson, Sean Gould – guitar
- James King – horns
- Grant Michaels – keyboards
- Kaveh Rastegar – bass
- Blair Sinta – drums

"Waiting for the Tide to Turn"

- Tony Chen – guitar
- Zelma Davis – backing vocals
- Nathan East – bass
- Ed Roth – Hammond B3 organ
- Bruce Sugar – keyboards

"Not Enough Love in the World"

- Steve Lukather – guitar, backing vocals
- Joseph Williams – keyboards, backing vocals, arrangement

== Charts ==
Chart performance for Zoom In
| Chart (2021) | Peak position |
|---|---|
| German Albums (Offizielle Top 100) | 22 |
| Scottish Albums (OCC) | 14 |
| US Billboard 200 | 179 |
| US Top Rock Albums (Billboard) | 37 |
