= I Wanna Be Santa Claus =

Studio album by Ringo Starr
- Released: 19 October 1999 (US)
- Recorded: September 1998, March–September 1999
- Studio: Whatinthewhatthe? (Los Angeles)
- Genres: Rock, christmas music
- Length: 44:59
- Label: Mercury
- Producers: Mark Hudson; Ringo Starr

Ringo Starr chronology
VH1 Storytellers (1998)	I Wanna Be Santa Claus (1999)	The Anthology... So Far (2001)

Singles from I Wanna Be Santa Claus
- 1. "Come On Christmas, Christmas Come On" Released: 1999 (promo only)

I Wanna Be Santa Claus is the twelfth studio album by Ringo Starr. A Christmas album, it was issued in 1999. Though every member had released at least one Christmas song, this marks the only time a Christmas album has been released by any member of the Beatles to date.

== Background and recording ==
Ringo Starr and musical partner Mark Hudson composed "Dear Santa" and "Christmas Eve" in July 1998 at Starr's Surrey residence. The pair of the songs were recorded a few months later, between 14 and 16 September in the UK. Follow-up sessions did not commence till 8 March 1999 at Whatinthewhatthe? Studios in Los Angeles, where the tracks "Rudolph the Red-Nosed Reindeer", "The Little Drummer Boy", "Christmas Time (Is Here Again)" and further work on "Dear Santa", were taped that day. "Christmas Time (Is Here Again") was originally recorded by The Beatles in 1967 for their annual Christmas record for members of their fan club. Featured on these tracks were Starr, Hudson, Jim Cox and Steve Dudas. Recorded throughout 1999 between Starr and Hudson, I Wanna Be Santa Claus—which is composed of half-and-half traditional songs and new originals—was made in several studios in the US and UK, with their families joining in and including two notable celebrity guests, Aerosmith's Joe Perry and Eagles member Timothy B. Schmit. Jeff Lynne also sings backing vocals on "Come on Christmas, Christmas Come On", "I Wanna Be Santa Claus", and "Christmas Time (Is Here Again)". The final sessions for the album were held on 8 and 9 September at Whatinthewhatthe? Studios, with mixing taking place at A&M Studios, Los Angeles and Sterling Sound, New York.

== Music and lyrics ==
The title track is about spreading Christmas cheer on every day of the year, compared to just on Christmas Day.

== Release and reception ==
Professional ratings
Review scores
Source	Rating
AllMusic	4/5 stars
Encyclopedia of Popular Music	2/5 stars
The Rolling Stone Album Guide	2/5 stars

Released on 19 October 1999, in the US by Mercury, (Note: US Mercury 314,546,668-2) ahead of the Christmas season, I Wanna Be Santa Claus was not a commercial success, despite its strong reviews. It was re-released on 23 September 2003 entitled 20th Century Masters: The Best of Ringo Starr/The Christmas Collection. Starr left Mercury after they had done no promotion for the album, which in turn resulted in few sales.

== Track listing ==
No.	Title	Writer(s)	Length
1.	"Come On Christmas, Christmas Come On"	Richard Starkey, Mark Hudson, Dean Grakal	3:36
2.	"Winter Wonderland"	Felix Bernard, Richard B. Smith	2:55
3.	"I Wanna Be Santa Claus"	Richard Starkey, Mark Hudson, Dick Monda	3:46
4.	"The Little Drummer Boy"	Harry Simeone, Henry Onorati, Katherine K. Davis	3:19
5.	"Rudolph the Red-Nosed Reindeer"	Johnny Marks	2:21
6.	"Christmas Eve"	Richard Starkey, Mark Hudson	4:26
7.	"The Christmas Dance"	Richard Starkey, Mark Hudson, Jim Cox, Steve Dudas	4:06
8.	"Christmas Time (Is Here Again)"	George Harrison, John Lennon, Paul McCartney, Richard Starkey	4:06
9.	"Blue Christmas"	Billy Hayes, Jay W. Johnson	2:58
10.	"Dear Santa"	Richard Starkey, Mark Hudson, Steve Dudas	5:12
11.	"White Christmas"	Irving Berlin	2:56
12.	"Pax Um Biscum (Peace Be with You)"	Richard Starkey, Mark Hudson, Scott Gordon	4:46
Total length:			44:59

== Personnel ==
- Ringo Starr – lead vocals, Mellotron on 12, bellowphone on 8, drums, percussion
- Ben Labi – guitar
- Bill Hudson – guitar
- Joe Perry – guitar
- Marc Fantini – guitar
- Mark Hudson – guitar, acoustic guitar, bass, keyboards, recorder
- Steffan Fantini – guitar
- Steve Dudas – guitar, acoustic guitar
- Matt Hurwitz – acoustic guitar
- Jaydee Maness – pedal steel guitar
- Armand Sabal-Lecco – bass
- Jim Cox – acoustic guitar, piano, organ, keyboards, synthesizer, accordion
- Scott Gordon – keyboards, synthesizer, harmonica
- Dan Higgins – saxophone
- Pat Zicari – saxophone
- Bob Murphy – bagpipe
- Ian Halliday – bagpipe
- Roger Houth – bagpipe
- Willie Cochrane – bagpipe
- Kalijut Bhamra – tabla
- George Hamer – orchestration
- Various guests – backing vocals
