= Vertical Man =

Studio album by Ringo Starr
- Released: 16 June 1998
- Recorded: March 1997 – February 1998
- Studios: Whatinthewhatthe? Studios, Los Angeles; The Mill, Sussex; AIR Studios, London; Village Recorder Studios, Los Angeles; FPSHOT, Oxfordshire; A&M Studios, Hollywood; Abbey Road Studios, London
- Genre: Rock
- Length: 51:41
- Label: Mercury
- Producers: Mark Hudson; Ringo Starr

Ringo Starr chronology
Ringo Starr and His Third All-Starr Band Volume 1 (1997)	Vertical Man (1998)	VH1 Storytellers (1998)

Singles from Vertical Man
- 1. "La De Da" Released: 2 June 1998

Vertical Man is the eleventh studio album by Ringo Starr, released on 16 June 1998 by Mercury Records. The album served as Starr's attempt at a commercial comeback following the success of The Beatles Anthology project. Starr enlisted the help of many of his musician friends in making Vertical Man, including Scott Weiland, Brian Wilson, Alanis Morissette, Ozzy Osbourne, Tom Petty, Joe Walsh, Timothy B. Schmit, Steven Tyler, and his former Beatles bandmates Paul McCartney and George Harrison. Beatles engineer Geoff Emerick mixed the tracks, and Starr and Mark Hudson served as producers.

== Background and recording ==
Ringo Starr met songwriter Dean Grakal at a party on New Year's Eve 1996, during which the pair had a discussion about songwriting, with Grakal proposing that they form a team with Mark Hudson, whom Starr had met years prior while Starr was working on Time Takes Time (1992). Starr spoke of the writing process in an interview with Billboard magazine: "This is the first time I've really been involved [in my record]. Whereas before, I'd just sort of pick out other people's songs or songs other people had written that I thought were vaguely trying to say what I would have liked to say, on this, we're really trying to say what I want to say, thank you."

In February 1997, Hudson and Grakal visited Starr in his Beverly Hills residence for a songwriting session. The result of this meeting was a song called "My Love", which was promptly renamed "Everyday" after Starr commented that McCartney had already used the title. The song was demoed under that name by Starr, Hudson, Grakal, and guitarist Steve Dudas. Happy with this session, the quartet followed it up with more recordings the following month, at Los Angeles's Whatinthewhatthe? Studios. There the musicians recorded two tracks: "Mr. Double-It-Up" and "One", the latter of which, per Grakal's lyric sheet, was originally called "All It Takes Is One". For these sessions, Starr played the drum set he had used during his time with The Beatles. In mid-to-late April, as Starr began rehearsals for an upcoming tour, Starr and Hudson worked on Vertical Man. Before embarking on the tour (which would begin on 28 April), Starr recorded "I'll Be Fine Anywhere". After the tour had finished on 8 June, Starr went on holiday, and returned in July. Recording for the album restarted in the same month, on 20 July, with Starr playing with The Roundheads as his backing band.

We had this open-door policy, whereby if you dropped by while we were recording, you were going to get asked to be on the record.

— Ringo Starr, after several people showed up at the sessions

Starr and the Roundheads recorded the tracks "What in the... World", "La De Da", and "Mindfield" on 20 July at Whatinthewhatthe? Studios. Starr added vocals to "What in the... World" on 28 July, and two days later to "Without Understanding". On 31 July, Joe Walsh showed up at Whatinthewhatthe? Studios and added guitar parts to "What in the... World", "La De Da" and "Mindfield". The next day, Starr re-recorded his "Without Understanding" vocal. On 5 August, the track "Old Country Song" (soon to be re-titled as "Good News") was recorded. The bass track to "Good News" was recorded two days later, by Lee Rocker. Starr and Hudson then flew to Europe at the end of August.

On 29 September, at McCartney's The Mill studio, McCartney, Starr, Hudson, Emerick and Paul Wright worked on the track "La De Da", which McCartney contributed bass and backing vocals to. This session was filmed by Grakal, and excerpts were later featured in the music video for the song. Also recorded was a new bass track for "What in the... World"— replacing the placeholder bass track from a July session. Upon hearing a playback of the track, McCartney remarked "Whoo ... Rich! Sounds kinda Beatle-ish!" to which Starr replied "I know! That's what I said to Mark months ago". McCartney, now looking at Starr, told him "You are a fucking Beatle!" On 15 October, the same day Starr was in Paris to watch McCartney's daughter Stella's fashion show, string overdubs were added on to "I'm Yours" and "King of Broken Hearts" at AIR Studios, located in London. Starr returned to Los Angeles on 1 November to add overdubs to the latest recorded material, and on 3 November, he recorded "I Was Walkin'". On 4 November, "The Puppet Song" was recorded. The song had originated from a comment by Starr ("Put the puppet to bed"), and would be renamed "Puppet". On 6 November, "Sometimes" was recorded, which contained a riff taken from Ringo's Rotogravure's (1976) "Cryin'".

I've always loved that song. I didn't get to play on the first one (1962) – I'll show the bastards!

— Ringo Starr, on the choice of re-making "Love Me Do"

On 7 November, Jeff Baxter overdubbed a steel guitar onto "One" and "Sometimes". On the same day, Jim Cox added keyboard overdubs to several songs; Starr originally wanted Billy Preston to play the keyboards, but he was in jail at the time. On 11 November at Village Recorder Studios, Baxter also added keyboards to three tracks: "I Was Walkin'", "La De Da" and "Sometimes". Overdubs were added to a number of tracks the following day at the same studio. On 13 November, an ensemble of 45 people—consisting of Starr's friends and family—gathered at Village Recorder Studios to record backing vocals to the track "La De Da". The following day, both Schmit and Dave Gibbs added backing vocals to "Puppet" and "Sometimes". On 17 November, Tyler flew from Amsterdam to Los Angeles to overdub harmonica to both "I Was Walkin'" and a re-make of "Love Me Do".

The following day, Tyler re-did his harmonica part to "Love Me Do". This was done at the request of Starr, who wanted it to sound closer to the Beatles' original version. On 19 November, Alanis Morissette stopped by Whatinthewhatthe? Studios and recorded a vocal for "Drift Away". The next day, at Village Recorder Studios, the gospel-choir group Sauce recorded backing vocals for ""Without Understanding" and "Drift Away". Brian Wilson, as well as Barbara Bach's cousin, Christian Phillippe Quillici, overdubbed backing vocals to "Without Understanding" on 25 November. Wilson dubbed several backing vocal tracks at Hudson's request. On the same day, Morissette added backing vocals to two tracks: "Mindfield" and "I Was Walkin'". Engineer Eric Greedy made two mixes—one with only vocals, and one of the just the backing tracks—of both "King of Broken Hearts" and "I'll Be Fine Anywhere". These were sent the next day to Harrison at his Friar Park residence. Up to this point, sixteen tracks in total had been recorded for the album. After arriving in Los Angeles on 30 November, up until 11 December, Geoff Emerick worked on mixing five tracks at A&M Studios ("One", "Mr. Double-It-Up", "Everyday", "I'm Yours" and "What in the... World"). Also on the 11th, minor mixing was conducted on "Love Me Do".

Starr had not paid rent since the beginning of the record sessions. As a result, Nina Pieseckyj—the landlord's secretary—arrived at Whatinthewhatthe? Studios on 12 December to request the rent. Starr immediately asked if she played an instrument, to which she replied "Yeah, cello". Starr proceeded to tell her to "go get it". Pieseckyj ended up playing a cello riff similar to "I Am the Walrus" on the track "Vertical Man". Also on this day, Starr was announced to have signed with an EMI subsidiary label, Guardian Records, to release his new album on the planned date of 21 April 1998. (Note: US Guardian A2-23702) On 16 December, a final mix of "Love Me Do" was made. A few days after having been signed to Guardian, the label (along with several other minor labels) was shut down by then-current EMI president Ken Barry, leaving Starr without a label on which to release the album. Upon finding this out, Starr added a final lead vocal track to "Vertical Man". All musicians and staff members then took a Christmas break from recording. Harrison's guitar overdubs were sent to Starr via mail and arrived on 22 December, after which he went with the Roundheads to Village Recorder Studios to hear the results. Upon hearing the solos, Starr exclaimed "You're killing me, George. You've got me crying, you bugger!".

Between 6 and 11 January 1998, the tracks "Mindfield", "King of Broken Hearts" and "Drift Away" were mixed at A&M Studios. Osbourne added a vocal track to "Vertical Man" on 16 January. The following day at A&M Studios, saxophonist Joel Peskin overdubbed saxophone onto "Puppet", which was then mixed on 23 January. On 29 January, Starr and friends listened to a playback of the album. Hudson and Emerick flew to New York on 17 February to oversee mastering of the album. Later that day, Hudson and Grakal met with Mercury's Danny Goldberg, with whom they made a deal to release the album. On 23 April, Starr removed Tyler's vocal at Mercury's request, as Aerosmith was due to have tracks released on the Armageddon soundtrack. Mastering was handled the next day at Masterdisc by Greg Calbi. Final mastering for the album was done from 2 to 6 May at A&M Studios. On the same day, at Abbey Road Studios, Starr, and Mark and Scott Gordon, via telephone, recorded Petty's (who is assisted by Greedy) vocals for the song "Drift Away", who was at Village Recorder Studios in Los Angeles. "Drift Away" was remastered, now with Petty's vocals for the song in the mix, on 12 May.

== Promotion, release and reception ==
Professional ratings
Review scores
Source	Rating
AllMusic	3/5 stars
The Encyclopedia of Popular Music	3/5 stars
The Essential Rock Discography	5/10
Galeria Musical	5/5 stars
NME	2/10
MusicHound	2.5/5
Q	2/5 stars

With the recent Beatles Anthology having introduced the group to newer and younger fans, it was reasoned that Starr would benefit from the exposure; McCartney's Flaming Pie had done very well upon its 1997 release. With Starr newly signed to a worldwide major label deal with Mercury, he was hoping for a similar reaction.

On both 13 and 14 April 1998, Starr held interviews to help promote the album, which was originally to be titled Thanks for Comin', before being changed after looking through a book belonging to Barbara Bach's daughter, Francesca. On the latter day, a photograph of Starr was taken for the album booklet by Henry Diltz. Starr planned to film a music video for "La De Da" at Shea Stadium in New York, though when the scheduled day arrived, filming was disrupted due to rain. As a result, filming moved to the streets of New York City, where Starr was shot sitting on a bench with an umbrella. The video is intercut with Starr and his backing band performing the song, along with footage of McCartney singing the chorus from the previous September. The original plan was for Starr to conduct a crowd singing one verse from "La De Da". On 14 May, in the US, Mercury sent out Electronic press kits (EPKs) for the album. On 18 May, Entertainment Tonight aired an interview with McCartney and Starr that was filmed during the sessions at McCartney's home studio. The "La De Da" video first aired on MTV in Europe on 19 May, while in the US the video aired on Entertainment Tonight on 25 May. On 1 June, radio stations were sent promotional copies of the single. A radio special, on 15 June, premiered the album worldwide. Interviews with Starr about the album were printed in both New Yorker and USA Today newspapers.

Vertical Man was released on 16 June in the US, (Note: US Mercury 314,558,400-2) with "La De Da" released as a single on 20 July (Note: US Mercury MELP 195) before being withdrawn a week later. Those who pre-ordered the album with Best Buy were given a three-track bonus CD of material not included on the album. Starr also arranged for a digipak edition—limited to 100,000 copies—to be released. The German version of the album included the bonus track "Mr. Double-It-Up", while the Japanese edition contained "Mr. Double-It-Up" and "Everyday". Attendees at the Beatlefest convention who had pre-ordered the album were given a 7" single of "La De Da", which included a non-album track "Everyday" as the B-side. "King of Broken Hearts" was released as a promotional single in 1998.

Vertical Man received average reviews and reached No. 61 in the US. The album was then released in the UK on 3 August, where it bubbled below the official Top 75, reaching No. 85 there, after having sold 2,000 copies.

Within the album's week of release, Starr held an online chat with fans. A tour followed the release of the album, although Starr said the tour was not only to promote the album: "I don't really ever want to do the two hours where it's just me. I like the mixture of the All-Stars because it's so much fun." On 5 April 1999, Hudson and Gordon made a single edit version of "La De Da", which Starr approved on 9 June. Nearly a month later, on 4 July, the single edit aired for the first time on British airwaves, thanks to The Chart Show.

== Track listing ==
All tracks written by Steve Dudas, Mark Hudson, Dean Grakal and Richard Starkey except where noted.

No.	Title	Writer(s)	Length
1.	"One"		3:02
2.	"What in the... World"		3:29
3.	"Mindfield"		4:06
4.	"King of Broken Hearts"		4:44
5.	"Love Me Do"	Lennon-McCartney	3:45
6.	"Vertical Man"		4:42
7.	"Drift Away"	Mentor Williams	4:09
8.	"I Was Walkin'"	Starkey, Hudson, Grakal	3:19
9.	"La De Da"		5:41
10.	"Without Understanding"	Starkey, Hudson, Dudas	4:22
11.	"I'll Be Fine Anywhere"		3:39
12.	"Puppet"		3:19
13.	"I'm Yours"	Starkey, Hudson, Mark Nevin	3:24
Total length:			51:41

Bonus tracks on Japanese release
No.	Title	Length
14.	"Mr. Double-It-Up"	4:00
15.	"Everyday"	4:09
Total length:		59:50

Best Buy pre-order bonus disc
No.	Title	Length
1.	"Mr. Double-It-Up"	4:00
2.	"Sometimes"	2:43
3.	"Good News"	3:11
Total length:		61:35

== Personnel ==
- Ringo Starr – lead and backing vocals, drums, percussion, keyboards on "I Was Walkin' and "Without Understanding", Mellotron on "Vertical Man", rhythm guitar on "Drift Away", artwork
- Mark Hudson – guitars, keyboards, Mellotron, bass guitar, percussion, banjo, backing vocals, artwork
- George Harrison – slide guitar on "King of Broken Hearts" and "I'll Be Fine Anywhere"
- Paul McCartney – bass guitar and backing vocals on "What in the... World" and "La De Da", backing vocals on "I Was Walkin'"
- Jeff Baxter – pedal steel guitar
- Joe Walsh – guitars, backing vocals
- Steve Cropper – electric guitar
- Mark Nevin – acoustic guitar
- Jim Cox – keyboards
- Steve Dudas – bass guitar, guitars
- Scott Gordon – percussion, harmonica, synthesizer
- John Bergamo – tabla
- Dean Grakal – percussion
- Eric Greedy – percussion, backing vocals
- David Greedy – percussion
- Joel Peskin – saxophone
- Nina Piaseckyj – cello
- Steven Tyler – harmonica on "I Was Walkin'", backing vocals, drums on "Drift Away"
- Alanis Morissette – vocals on "Drift Away"
- Tom Petty – vocals on "Drift Away"
- Barbara Bach – backing vocals, artwork
- Scott Weiland, Ozzy Osbourne, Brian Wilson, Sarah Hudson, Barbara Vander Linde, Rose Stone, Lisa Banks, Ollie Woodson, Howard McCray, Christina Rasch, Keith Allison, Astrid Barber, James Barber, Blake V. Brown, Scott Brown, Vincent Brown, Joie Calio, Jim Cushinery, Doug Fieger, Eric Gardner, Scott Gordon, Bruce Grakal, Christopher Grakal, Ronni Grakal, Steve Greenberg, Michael Gurley, Kay Harrison, Tommy Harrison, Dawn Hoenie, Daniel Lanois, Phil Leavitt, Stuart Lerner, Nils Lofgren, Gabriella Paglia, Van Dyke Parks, Sally Parks, Elizabeth Parks, Marjorie Rufus-Isaacs, Jean Schmit, Timothy B. Schmit, Lee Starkey, Tina Stem, Jennifer Sylvor, Barbara Vander Linde, Tatiana Von Furstenberg, Christian Phillippe Quilici, Alfie Silas-Durio, Carolyn Perry, Darlene Perry, Sharon Perry, Leon McCray, James McCray, Dave Gibbs – backing vocals

== Charts ==
Chart (1998)	Peak position
Australian Albums (ARIA)	90
German Albums (Offizielle Top 100)	59
US Billboard 200	61
UK Albums (Official Charts)	85
