= EP3 (Ringo Starr EP) =

2022 EP by Ringo Starr

EP by Ringo Starr
- Released: 16 September 2022
- Studio: Roccabella West; East West Studios; Greenleaf Studios
- Genre: Rock
- Length: 16:45
- Label: Universal Music Enterprises
- Producer: Ringo Starr; Bruce Sugar; Linda Perry

Ringo Starr chronology
Change the World (2021)	EP3 (2022)	Rewind Forward (2023)

Singles from EP3
- 1. "World Go Round" Released: 16 September 2022; 2. "Everyone and Everything" Released: 18 November 2022

EP3 is the third extended play (EP) by English singer-songwriter Ringo Starr, released on 16 September 2022 by Universal Music Enterprises. It was produced by Starr and co-produced by Bruce Sugar, except "Everyone and Everything" which was written and produced by Linda Perry.

== Track listing ==
EP3 track listing
No.	Title	Writer(s)	Length
1.	"World Go Round"	Steve Lukather, Joseph Williams	4:12
2.	"Everyone and Everything"	Linda Perry	2:50
3.	"Let's Be Friends"	Bruce Sugar; Sam Hollander	4:15
4.	"Free Your Soul" (featuring Dave Koz and José Antonio Rodríguez)	Richard Starkey; Sugar	5:28
Total length:			16:45

== Personnel ==
- Ringo Starr – drums, percussion and vocals
- Steve Lukather – guitar
- Linda Perry – guitar, percussion, backing vocals on "Everyone and Everything"
- José Antonio Rodríguez – nylon guitar on "Free Your Soul"
- Billy Mohler – guitar and bass on "Everyone and Everything"
- Nathan East – bass
- Bruce Sugar – keyboards, percussion, horn arrangement on "Let's Be Friends" and "Free Your Soul"
- Joseph Williams – keyboards and backing vocals on "World Go Round"
- Damon Fox – keyboards on "Everyone and Everything"
- Dave Koz – tenor sax on "Free Your Soul"
- Billy Valentine – backing vocals
- Zelma Davis – backing vocals
- Maiya Sykes – backing vocals
- Sam Hollander – percussion and handclaps on "Let's Be Friends"

Production

- Ringo Starr – producer
- Bruce Sugar – producer, mixer
- Logan Taylor – assistant engineer
- Luis Flores – assistant engineer on "Everyone and Everything"
- Chris Bellman (at Bernie Grundman Mastering) – mastering

== Charts ==
Chart performance for EP3
Chart (2022)	Peak position
US Top Album Sales (Billboard)	56
