= Don't Pass Me By =

1968 song by the Beatles

- Cover of the Apple Publishing sheet music

Song by the Beatles

from the album The Beatles
- Released: 22 November 1968
- Recorded: 5–6 June, 12 and 22 July 1968
- Studio: EMI, London
- Genre: Country and western; country rock
- Length: 3:46 (mono); 3:51 (stereo)
- Label: Apple
- Songwriter: Richard Starkey
- Producer: George Martin

"Don't Pass Me By" is a song by the English rock band the Beatles from their 1968 double album The Beatles (also known as the "White Album"). It was the first solo composition written by drummer Ringo Starr.

The song was released as a single in Scandinavia (misattributed to Lennon–McCartney) and peaked at number one in Denmark in April 1969.

== Origin ==
Starr first played the song for the other Beatles soon after he joined the group in August 1962. During an interview, Starr commented on the songwriting process, saying: "I wrote 'Don't Pass Me By' when I was sitting round at home. I was fiddling with the piano – I just bang away – and then if a melody comes and some words, I just have to keep going. It was great to get my first song down, one that I had written. It was a very exciting time for me and everyone was really helpful, and recording that crazy violinist was a thrilling moment".

The earliest public mention of the track seems to have been in a BBC chatter session introducing "And I Love Her" on the radio show Top Gear in 1964. In the conversation, Starr was asked if he had written a song and Paul McCartney mocked him soon afterwards, singing the first line of the refrain, "Don't pass me by, don't make me cry, don't make me blue, baby".

== Recording ==
The song was recorded in four separate sessions in 1968: 5 and 6 June, and 12 and 22 July. Despite references to it in 1964 as "Don't Pass Me By", it was called "Ringo's Tune (Untitled)" on 5 June session tape label and "This Is Some Friendly" on 6 June label. By 12 July, the title was restored.

During a lead vocal track recorded on 6 June, Starr audibly counted out eight beats, and it can be heard in the released song starting at 2:30 of the 1987 CD version. The monaural mix is faster than the stereo mix, and features a different arrangement of violin in the fade-out.

George Martin arranged an orchestral interlude as an introduction, but this was rejected. It would eventually be used as an incidental cue for the Beatles' animated film Yellow Submarine. In 1996, the introduction was released as the track "A Beginning" on Anthology 3.

At the start of the Beatles' filmed rehearsals at Twickenham Film Studios in January 1969, George Harrison, having recently visited Bob Dylan and the Band in Woodstock in upstate New York, reported to Starr and McCartney that "Don't Pass Me By" was the Band's favourite track on the White Album. He added that the song's country mood was "their scene completely" and told Starr, "You'd go down a bomb with them".

== Critical reception ==
Among contemporary reviews of The Beatles, Record Mirror said that "Don't Pass Me By" had a "carnival atmosphere" and a "'gay Paree' sound", adding that, with Starr's vocal, the track was "very appealing". Writing for the same publication in January 1969, however, David Griffiths said that although he considered The Beatles to be the best album of the past year, the song's arrangement "has quickly palled on me" and "I do tend to jump the needle here." Barry Miles of International Times described "Don't Pass Me By" as "Ringo's C&W number" and a "great song", and highlighted the "excellent fiddle player" and "bag-pipe effect". In his review for The New York Times, Nik Cohn recognised the track as "the Beatles five years back, straight ahead and clumsy and greatly enjoyable, backed by a beautiful hurdy-gurdy organ and made perfect by Ringo's own vocal, sleepwalking as ever".

Writing in 2014, Ian Fortnam of Classic Rock magazine cited "Don't Pass Me By" as one of the four songs that made the Beatles' White Album an "enduring blueprint for rock", along with "Yer Blues", "While My Guitar Gently Weeps" and "Helter Skelter", in that together they contained "every one of rock's key ingredients". In the case of Starr's song, he said that the track was poorly served by the McCartney-led arrangement, yet it represented a "southern rock exemplar par excellence" for musicians to come.

Coinciding with the 50th anniversary of its release, Jacob Stolworthy of The Independent listed "Don't Pass Me By" at number 26 in his ranking of the White Album's 30 tracks. He wrote: "This country ditty from Ringo was written years before the White Album, and – while suitably thigh-slapping – doesn’t ever outlive its making-up-the-numbers status".

== Personnel ==
Personnel per Ian MacDonald and supported by Mark Lewisohn

- Ringo Starr – double-tracked vocals, drums, tack piano, sleigh bells, cowbell, maracas, congas
- Paul McCartney – grand piano, bass guitar
- Jack Fallon – violin

The pianos were both recorded into a Leslie 147 speaker.

== Cover versions ==
"Don't Pass Me By" has been covered by the alt-country band the Gourds, by the Southern rock band the Georgia Satellites on their 1988 album Open All Night, and by the Punkles on their 2004 album Pistol. Fortnam highlights the Georgia Satellites' recording as a version that successfully captured the "full boogie-rocking potential" that had been ignored in the Beatles' guitar-less arrangement in 1968.

Phish covered "Don't Pass Me By" live as part of their interpretation of The Beatles, released on the album Live Phish Volume 13, giving the song a bluegrass arrangement.

Ringo Starr released a re-recording of the song as a bonus track on his 2017 album Give More Love.

== "A Beginning" ==
"A Beginning"

Instrumental by George Martin

from the album Anthology 3
- Released: 28 October 1996 (UK); 29 October 1996 (US)
- Recorded: 22 July 1968
- Studio: EMI, London
- Genre: Orchestral
- Length: 0:50
- Label: Apple Records
- Composer: George Martin
- Producer: George Martin

"A Beginning" is an instrumental piece composed by Martin and intended as an introduction to "Don't Pass Me By". It was instead used as an incidental cue in the Beatles' cartoon film Yellow Submarine and heard right before "Eleanor Rigby".

When the planned "new Beatles song", "Now and Then", intended for Anthology 3 in the same way "Free as a Bird" had been on Anthology 1 and "Real Love" on Anthology 2, was abandoned, "A Beginning" was included on Anthology 3 in its place.

"A Beginning" was scored by George Martin and recorded on 22 July 1968, using the same orchestra that appeared on the Beatles' song "Good Night".

=== Personnel ===
- Unknown musicians: twelve violins, three violas, harp, three flutes, clarinets, horn, vibraphone, bass.
