= Universal Music Enterprises =

US record label; catalogue division of Universal Music Group

- Company type: Division
- Industry: Music
- Founded: October 1999
- Headquarters: Santa Monica, California, United States
- Parent: Universal Music Group
- Website: www.umgcatalog.com

Universal Music Enterprises (UMe, stylized as UM^{e}) is the catalogue division of Universal Music Group. It includes Hip-O Records, Universal Chronicles, and UM^{3}. Under various divisions, it reissues many classic albums from the UMG back catalogue, and also various compilation albums, including series such as the 20th Century Masters - The Millennium Collection and Icon budget lines and the 2-disc Gold compilations. UMe also handles synchronization licenses for films, television and video games.

The UMe label is primarily used for releases in the United States. Outside the US, the labels UMC (Univeral Music Catalogue) or UMR (Universal Music Recordings) are used.

== Albums released ==
It also released Billy Ray Cyrus's album Wanna Be Your Joe and re-released John Cougar Mellencamp's American Fool and Tom Petty's Greatest Hits. In 2012, UM^{e} took over distribution of Frank Zappa's recorded music catalogue.

In December 2016, Round Hill Music signed a distribution deal with UMe, covering The Offspring's Columbia Records albums.

In 2017, Styx signed with UMe for the album The Mission. Later that same year, Universal announced the formation of Urban Legends, a new catalogue division, which focuses on reissues of hip-hop and R&B releases.

In August 2021, American rock band Aerosmith signed a worldwide distribution deal with UMe, covering their entire catalogue of recordings for both Universal's Geffen Records and Sony Music Entertainment's Columbia Records.
