= Sunshine Life for Me (Sail Away Raymond) =

Song by Ringo Starr

from the album Ringo
- Released: 2 November 1973
- Genre: Folk rock, country
- Length: 2:45
- Label: Apple
- Songwriter: George Harrison
- Producer: Richard Perry

"Sunshine Life for Me (Sail Away Raymond)" is a song by the English musician Ringo Starr from his 1973 album Ringo. It was written by George Harrison, Starr's former bandmate in the Beatles, and was one of several contributions Harrison made to Ringo. Recording for the song took place in Los Angeles in March 1973, with Richard Perry as producer. In addition to Starr and Harrison, the musicians on the track include Levon Helm, Robbie Robertson, Rick Danko and Garth Hudson of the Band, and multi-instrumentalist David Bromberg.

Harrison wrote "Sunshine Life for Me" in Ireland while staying with Scottish singer-songwriter Donovan. In a contrast with the reconciliatory mood among the four ex-Beatles when the song was recorded, the visit occurred shortly after the London High Court's ruling on the dissolution of the band in March 1971. The composition reflects the influence of Irish folk music, as well as aspects of country, hootenanny and the sea shanty tradition. In his lyrics, Harrison espouses an escape from modern life for the tranquility of nature. The "Raymond" named in the song title was a lawyer hired by Allen Klein, the manager of Harrison, Starr and John Lennon, to represent the three former Beatles and Apple Corps in the High Court action initiated by Paul McCartney.

On release, "Sunshine Life for Me" received a varied response from music critics, some of whom dismissed it as an inauspicious track. Among retrospective reviewers, several commentators have admired its lightheartedness and consider the song to be a worthy example of Starr's work in the country genre. Harrison biographer Simon Leng describes it as "musically an homage to the spirit of the Band's 'Rag Mama Rag'".

== Background and inspiration ==
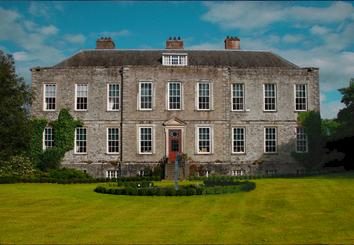
The main house at Castle Martin, in County Kildare, where Harrison stayed with Donovan in 1971

George Harrison wrote "Sunshine Life for Me (Sail Away Raymond)" while on holiday in Ireland with his wife, Pattie Boyd. The couple stayed with Scottish singer Donovan, a friend of the Beatles since the mid-1960s and a fellow student on the band's 1968 Transcendental Meditation course in India. The visit took place over the Easter holiday weekend in April 1971, when Donovan, a tax exile in Ireland, hosted a party for his musician friends at the Castle Martin estate in Kilcullen, County Kildare. While discussing the song in his autobiography, I, Me, Mine, Harrison recalls composing the melody on an open-tuned guitar; he says he wrote it "like an old Irish folk song, a bit like country music". (Note: In Donovan's autobiography, he includes a picture of Harrison "play[ing] me his new song on my twelve-string" at Castle Martin in 1971.)

The holiday provided a respite for Harrison in the aftermath of the Beatles' break-up. According to Boyd, despite the freedom he now enjoyed as a solo artist, and the acclaim afforded his 1970 triple album All Things Must Pass, Harrison was distressed at the hostility that prevailed among the four former bandmates. On 12 March 1971, the High Court in London had ruled in Paul McCartney's favour against the other three Beatles and their manager, Allen Klein, resulting in the group's company, Apple Corps, being placed into receivership. During this time, press reports from the court case had conveyed the full extent of the acrimony that existed between Klein's clients – Harrison, John Lennon and Ringo Starr – and McCartney.

Having expressed his frustration with the legal proceedings in another recent composition, "Sue Me, Sue You Blues", Harrison addressed one of the Klein-appointed lawyers, named Raymond, in the parenthetical subtitle of "Sunshine Life for Me". (Note: Aside from ABKCO lawyer Peter Howard, the legal team assembled by Klein included Raymond Skilling, a partner with the London law firm Clifford Turner.) In I, Me, Mine, Harrison says that Raymond was "in my mind at the time", hence the instruction for him to "sail away".

== Composition ==
"Sunshine Life for Me (Sail Away Raymond)" is in 4/4 time and in the musical key of E. Rather than using formal chord changes, the melody is established through a modal riff over a constant E major chord. Harrison biographer Simon Leng considers the song to be "musically an homage to the spirit" of "Rag Mama Rag" by the Band, who epitomised the counterculture's embracing of pastoral values in the late 1960s. Having spent time with the group in Woodstock in late 1968, following the completion of the Beatles' White Album, Harrison had drawn inspiration from the Band's focus on traditional song forms during the final year of the Beatles' career. Among other authors commenting on the song's musical style, Starr biographer Alan Clayson deems it "a hootenanny hoe-down", while Beatles scholar Michael Frontani writes of its "authentic country-bluegrass" mood.

In Leng's description, notwithstanding the song's lighthearted qualities, the lyrical theme of "Sunshine Life for Me" is "escape from people, pressure, and society". During the choruses, Harrison states that a "sunshine life" awaits him if he were only able to escape from "this cloud over me". In keeping with the rustic theme, Harrison says that he would prefer to associate with trees than with humans, since "most folks just bore me / Always imposing ..." In the second verse, he dismisses Raymond, telling him:

There's a good life had at sea ...
That's the life for you
Sail away Raymond, sail away.

While recognising "cheerfulness" as the song's prevailing emotion, author Ian Inglis writes that Harrison's instruction to Raymond is "perfectly apt, given the song's likeness to a traditional sea shanty". The composition ends with multiple vocal parts, staggering the chorus lines.

Leng compares "Sunshine Life for Me" with "The Pirate Song", a sea shanty written by Harrison and comedian Eric Idle in 1975, in which Harrison sings of wanting to be a pirate rather than a celebrity. Theologian Dale Allison views the track as an example of how its composer's work "often revels in the natural world". According to Allison, the same "easy romanticism about nature" returns in "Blow Away" and songs from Harrison's 1982 album Gone Troppo, while also contrasting with the "ecological anxiety" he expresses in tracks such as "Tears of the World", "Cockamamie Business" and the Monty Python-influenced "Save the World".

== Recording ==
In March 1973, following the completion of his album Living in the Material World, Harrison offered "Sunshine Life for Me" to Starr for inclusion on the latter's first rock solo album, Ringo. (Note: Starr's only previous forays into rock or pop as a solo artist had been two Harrison-produced singles over 1971–72, "It Don't Come Easy" and "Back Off Boogaloo".) The main sessions for Ringo took place in Los Angeles that same month and coincided with a spirit of reconciliation among all the former Beatles, after Harrison, Starr and Lennon had grown disaffected with Klein as a manager. In addition to "Sunshine Life for Me" and individual contributions from Lennon and McCartney, Starr received co-writing assistance from Harrison on "Photograph", which became Starr's first number 1 hit on the US Billboard Hot 100 chart when released as the album's advance single. (Note: As had been the case since the group's break-up, Harrison was the most active of Starr's former bandmates in supporting him on Ringo. He also contributed the album's closing song, "You and Me (Babe)", a collaboration with Mal Evans, and played on Lennon's composition "I'm the Greatest". This last session, featuring Starr, Lennon and Harrison, instantly led to speculation in the press that the Beatles were about to re-form.)

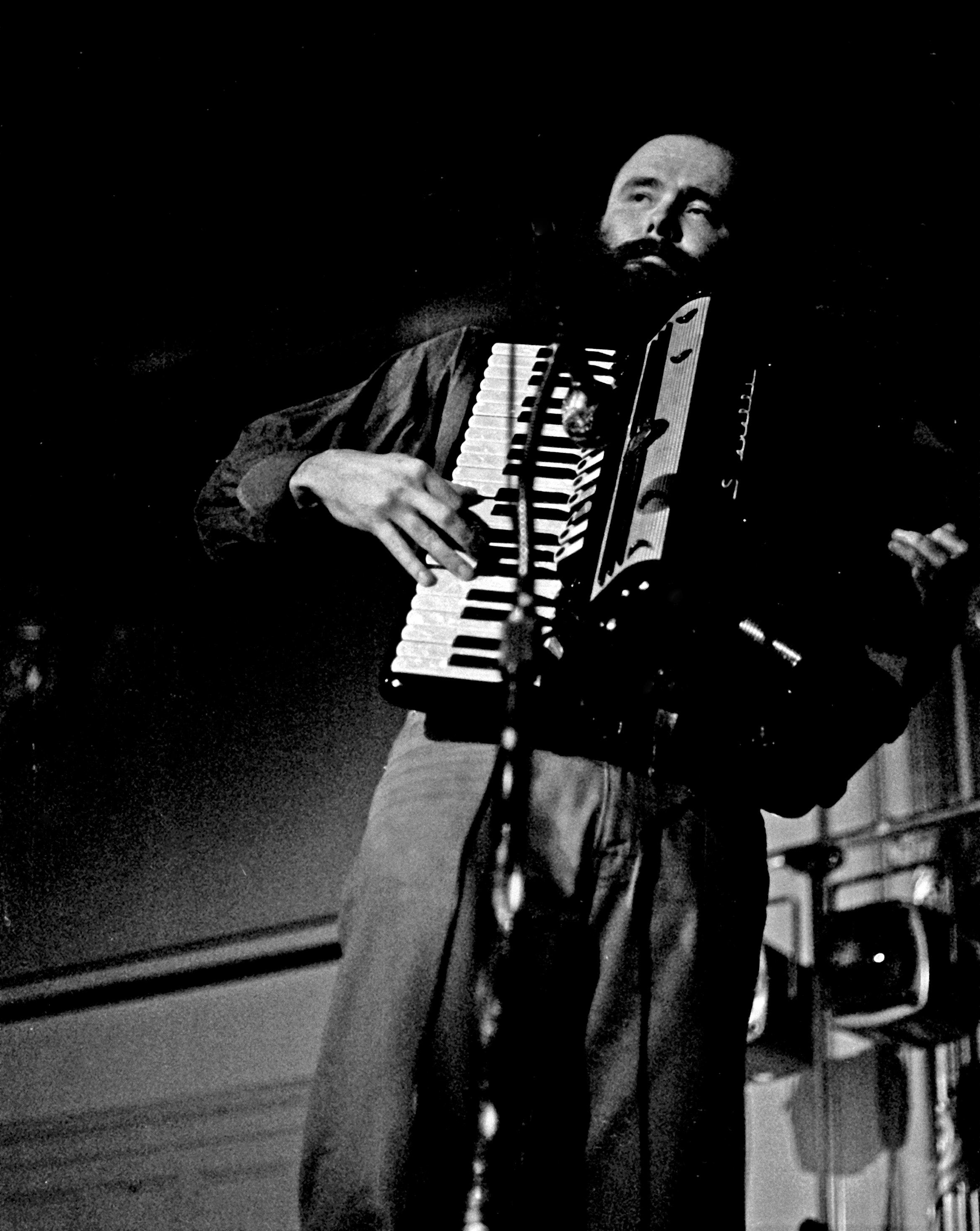
Garth Hudson of the Band played accordion on the song.

With Richard Perry as his producer, Starr recorded the basic track for "Sunshine Life for Me" at Sunset Sound Recorders in early March. He later referred to Ringo as his "accidental album", since the project was planned at the last minute, and many of his collaborators were in Los Angeles for other reasons. In the case of the musicians on "Sunshine Life for Me", Harrison was there primarily to join Starr and Lennon for business meetings at Capitol Records before producing Ravi Shankar's Shankar Family & Friends album, while the Band were in Los Angeles to record Moondog Matinee. The line-up on the track included four members of the Band – Levon Helm (on mandolin), Robbie Robertson (guitar), Rick Danko (fiddle) and Garth Hudson (accordion) – and multi-instrumentalist David Bromberg (on banjo and fiddle). (Note: The fifth member of the Band, singer and pianist Richard Manuel, was incapacitated for much of this period due to his problems with alcoholism and drug addiction. In the group's usual set-up when Levon Helm switched from drums to mandolin or guitar, as on "Rag Mama Rag", Manuel played drums.) A friend of the Beatles since their years in Hamburg, Klaus Voormann played upright bass.

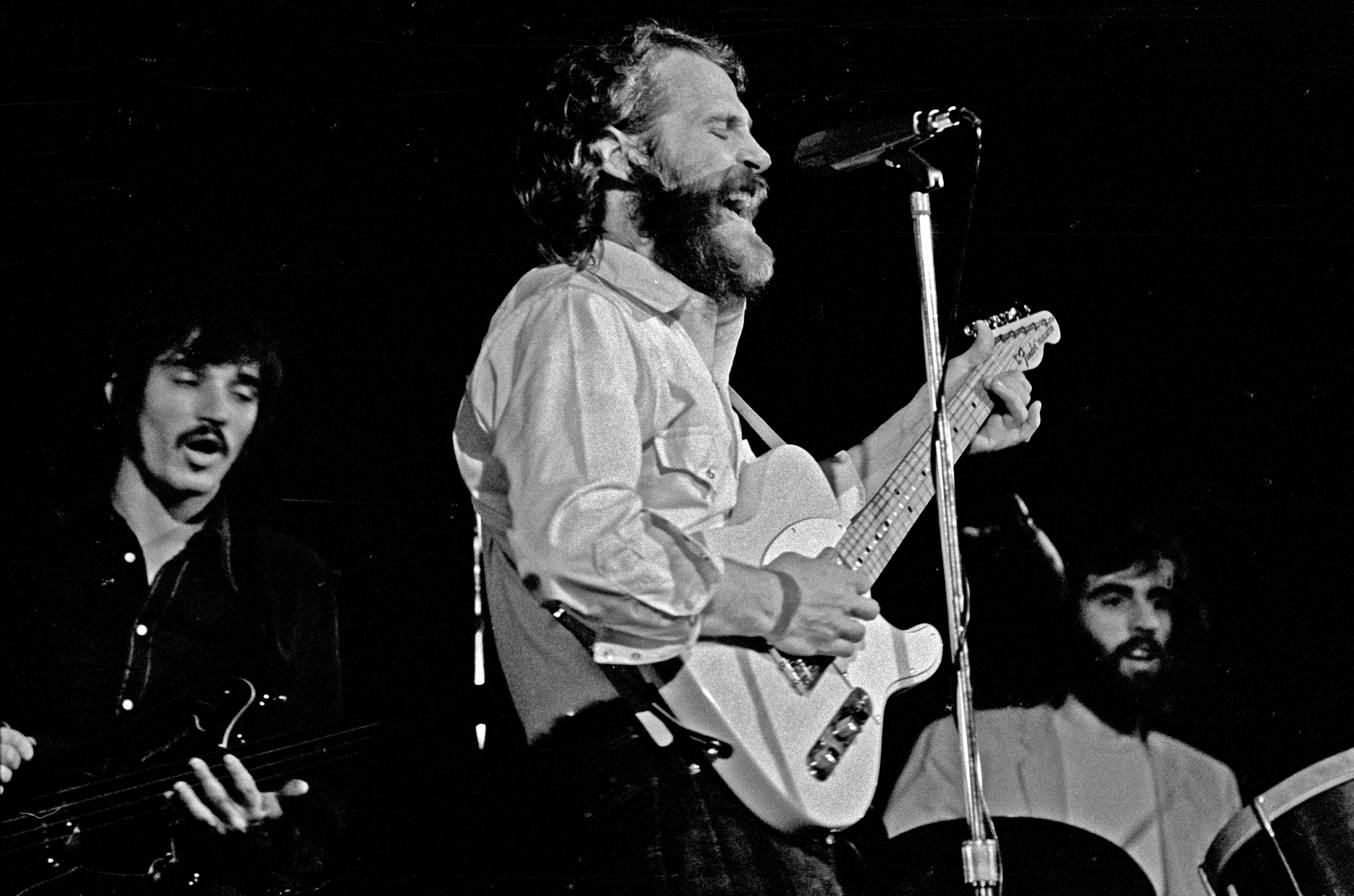
The Band's Rick Danko, Levon Helm and Richard Manuel performing in 1971

Pop culture author Robert Rodriguez describes "Sunshine Life for Me" as a song "custom-crafted" for Starr, who had previously demonstrated an affiliation for country music in his White Album composition "Don't Pass Me By" and in his 1970 country album Beaucoups of Blues, which he recorded in Nashville with producer Pete Drake. (Note: According to Harrison's report to Starr and McCartney after his return from Woodstock in December 1968, "Don't Pass Me By" was the Band's favourite track on the White Album.) Harrison recalls in I, Me, Mine that it was "a fun session and a good track". Robertson also expressed his enjoyment, saying that after Harrison showed them the song, he and his bandmates "went into our mountain-music mode". Both avowed fans of the group since the late 1960s, Starr and Harrison recorded with the Band for the first time on "Sunshine Life for Me". In Starr's case, the association continued with his appearance at the Last Waltz in November 1976 and subsequent live performances with Helm and Danko in 1989. (Note: In addition, Robertson contributed the lead guitar part to "Snookeroo", a song written by Elton John and Bernie Taupin that appears on Starr's 1974 album Goodnight Vienna.)

Overdubbing on the songs recorded for Ringo, including Starr's lead vocals, took place at Sunset Sound and other studios in Los Angeles from late March to July 1973. The other vocal parts on "Sunshine Life for Me" were sung by Harrison and Vini Poncia, Starr's regular songwriting partner during much of the 1970s. Leng highlights these multiple harmonies as both a "shared inheritance" of the Beatles and the Band, and a precursor to Harrison's later work with the Traveling Wilburys.

== Release ==
Apple Records issued Ringo on 2 November 1973. The release coincided with Lennon, Harrison and Starr suing Klein in the High Court for payment of funds owed to the Beatles and for misrepresenting their interests. "Sunshine Life for Me (Sail Away Raymond)" was sequenced as the fourth track on the album, between "Photograph" and "You're Sixteen". In his book The Beatles Solo on Apple Records, Bruce Spizer describes the first five tracks on Ringo as "one of the strongest album sides produced by any ex-Beatle". The album cover consisted of a painting by Tim Bruckner in which Harrison, the four members of the Band and all the other musicians on the recording appear, alongside Starr.

"Sunshine Life for Me" was published by the Material World Charitable Foundation, which Harrison had set up in April 1973, and administered through his company Harrisongs. Don McLean covered the song on his 1974 album Homeless Brother. The JSD Band, a Scottish folk-rock band, also released it in 1974, as the B-side of a 7" single, 'Hayes and Harlington Blues'. In what musicologist Thomas MacFarlane views as a possible "gesture of respect" towards Harrison and his love of Indian music, McLean's arrangement includes tabla backing. London-based recording engineer David Hentschel covered "Sunshine Life for Me", along with all the other tracks from Ringo, on his 1975 album Sta*rtling Music. An experimental work featuring Hentschel on ARP synthesizer, the album was one of the first releases on Starr's short-lived record label, Ring O' Records.

Harrison's version of the song, with Starr and members of the Band, was released on the 50th anniversary edition of his 1973 album Living in the Material World in November 2024.

== Critical reception ==
In his album review for Disc magazine, Michael Benton said that "Sunshine Life for Me" represented "a somewhat subdued patch" between the obvious hit singles, "Photograph" and "You're Sixteen". While the critical reception to Ringo was generally highly favourable, the NME's Charles Shaar Murray derided the album for its "dearth of good material", saying that the record's appeal was confined to the most committed Beatles nostalgics. He described "Sunshine Life for Me" as the best of the three Harrison contributions, but only due to the presence of the Band and Bromberg. (Note: In addition to wondering why Richard Manuel had "stayed home sulking", Shaar Murray commented: "Harrison is credited with 'Backing Vocals' on that track, which is odd since he's been singing like that for years.") Writing in Rolling Stone, Ben Gerson called "Sunshine Life for Me" a "modal banjo tune" that "never manages to transcend its idiom, much less to fulfil it", while Alan Betrock of Phonograph Record dismissed the song as "muzak without definition". By contrast, Loraine Alterman of The New York Times deemed it "a dynamite bluegrassy number with a really sharp lyric about a guy who wants to get away from it all but just can't see that the problem is inside him".

Comparing "Sunshine Life for Me" with the devout lyrical content of Living in the Material World, Beatles biographer Nicholas Schaffner opined that with this song Harrison had "managed to be amusing for the first time in years". Writing in 1981, NME critic Bob Woffinden admired the track as "a sort of update of 'Mother Nature's Son'" on an album that contained "excellent compositions" from Starr's former bandmates and conveyed "a zestfulness, an unashamed joie de vivre". (Note: In his review of Don McLean's version, Woffinden said it was "a good song well sung, with lovely banjo" and one of the most effective tracks on Homeless Brother.)

Among other retrospective assessments, Chip Madinger and Mark Easter, writing in their book on the former Beatles' solo careers, admire the song as "a hoedown stomper which was as country as any of the tracks on Beaucoups of Blues". Ian Inglis writes of "Sunshine Life for Me": "The result is a convincing piece of good-time folk-rock that would have been at home on Fairport Convention's groundbreaking album Liege & Lief, which was itself hugely influenced by the spirit of the Band's Music from Big Pink ... [T]he impression lingers that the track was as much fun to make as it is to hear."

In the 2005 publication NME Originals: Beatles – The Solo Years 1970–1980, Paul Moody included "Sunshine Life for Me" among Starr's "ten solo gems", describing it as a "joyful hillbilly romp". Former Mojo editor Mat Snow cites it as an example of how Harrison and Lennon served their former bandmate well with their respective contributions to Ringo – in the case of "Sunshine Life for Me (Sail Away Raymond)", by "amusingly hark[ing] back to Ringo's songs of life beneath the waves while extolling his yachting lifestyle on the surface". In The Cambridge Companion to the Beatles, Michael Frontani describes it as "perhaps the most lively track" on a "remarkable" album.

== Personnel ==
According to Bruce Spizer:

- Ringo Starr – vocals, drums, percussion
- George Harrison – electric guitar, backing vocals
- Robbie Robertson – electric guitar
- Levon Helm – mandolin
- David Bromberg – banjo, fiddle
- Garth Hudson – accordion
- Rick Danko – fiddle
- Klaus Voormann – standup bass
- Vini Poncia – backing vocals

== Sources ==
- Dale C. Allison Jr., The Love There That's Sleeping: The Art and Spirituality of George Harrison, Continuum (New York, NY, 2006; ISBN 978-0-8264-1917-0).
- Keith Badman, The Beatles Diary Volume 2: After the Break-Up 1970–2001, Omnibus Press (London, 2001; ISBN 0-7119-8307-0).
- Harry Castleman & Walter J. Podrazik, All Together Now: The First Complete Beatles Discography 1961–1975, Ballantine Books (New York, NY, 1976; ISBN 0-345-25680-8).
- Alan Clayson, Ringo Starr, Sanctuary (London, 2003; ISBN 1-86074-488-5).
- Peter Doggett, You Never Give Me Your Money: The Beatles After the Breakup, It Books (New York, NY, 2011; ISBN 978-0-06-177418-8).
- Paul Du Noyer, "Champagne Supernova", Mojo, July 2001, pp. 48–54.
- Michael Frontani, "The Solo Years", in Kenneth Womack (ed.), The Cambridge Companion to the Beatles, Cambridge University Press (Cambridge, UK, 2009; ISBN 978-1-139-82806-2), pp. 153–82.
- George Harrison, I Me Mine, Chronicle Books (San Francisco, CA, 2002; ISBN 0-8118-3793-9).
- Bill Harry, The Ringo Starr Encyclopedia, Virgin Books (London, 2004; ISBN 978-0-7535-0843-5).
- Levon Helm (with Stephen Davis), This Wheel's on Fire: Levon Helm and the Story of The Band, A Cappella Books (Chicago, IL, 2000; ISBN 978-1-55652-405-9).
- Chris Hunt (ed.), NME Originals: Beatles – The Solo Years 1970–1980, IPC Ignite! (London, 2005).
- Ian Inglis, The Words and Music of George Harrison, Praeger (Santa Barbara, CA, 2010; ISBN 978-0-313-37532-3).
- Donovan Leitch, The Autobiography of Donovan Leitch: The Hurdy Gurdy Man, St. Martin's Griffin (New York, NY, 2007; ISBN 978-0-312-36434-2).
- Simon Leng, While My Guitar Gently Weeps: The Music of George Harrison, Hal Leonard (Milwaukee, WI, 2006; ISBN 1-4234-0609-5).
- Thomas MacFarlane, The Music of George Harrison, Routledge (Abingdon, UK, 2019; ISBN 978-1-138-59910-9).
- Chip Madinger & Mark Easter, Eight Arms to Hold You: The Solo Beatles Compendium, 44.1 Productions (Chesterfield, MO, 2000; ISBN 0-615-11724-4).
- Patricia Romanowski & Holly George-Warren (eds), The New Rolling Stone Encyclopedia of Rock & Roll, Fireside/Rolling Stone Press (New York, NY, 1995; ISBN 0-684-81044-1).
- Robert Rodriguez, Fab Four FAQ 2.0: The Beatles' Solo Years, 1970–1980, Backbeat Books (Milwaukee, WI, 2010; ISBN 978-1-4165-9093-4).
- Nicholas Schaffner, The Beatles Forever, McGraw-Hill (New York, NY, 1978; ISBN 0-07-055087-5).
- Judy Slinn, Clifford Chance: Its Origins and Development, Granta Editions (London, 1993; ISBN 978-0-906782-98-9).
- Mat Snow, The Beatles Solo: The Illustrated Chronicles of John, Paul, George, and Ringo After The Beatles (Volume 4: Ringo), Race Point Publishing (New York, NY, 2013; ISBN 978-1-937994-26-6).
- Stan Soocher, Baby You're a Rich Man: Suing the Beatles for Fun and Profit, University Press of New England (Lebanon, NH, 2015; ISBN 978-1-61168-380-6).
- Bruce Spizer, The Beatles Solo on Apple Records, 498 Productions (New Orleans, LA, 2005; ISBN 0-9662649-5-9).
- Doug Sulpy & Ray Schweighardt, Get Back: The Unauthorized Chronicle of The Beatles' Let It Be Disaster, St. Martin's Griffin (New York, NY, 1999; ISBN 0-312-19981-3).
- Bob Woffinden, The Beatles Apart, Proteus (London, 1981; ISBN 0-906071-89-5).
