= I'm the Greatest =

1973 song by Ringo Starr

Song by Ringo Starr

from the album Ringo
- Released: 2 November 1973
- Recorded: March 1973
- Studio: Sunset Sound, Los Angeles
- Genre: Rock
- Length: 3:21
- Label: Apple
- Songwriter: John Lennon
- Producer: Richard Perry

"I'm the Greatest" is a song written by the English musician John Lennon that was released as the opening track of the 1973 album Ringo by Ringo Starr. With Starr, Lennon and George Harrison appearing on the track, it marks the only time that three former Beatles recorded together between the band's break-up in 1970 and Lennon's death in 1980. Lennon wrote the song in December 1970 as a wry comment on his rise to fame, and later tailored the lyrics for Starr to sing. Named after one of Muhammad Ali's catchphrases, the song partly evokes the stage-show concept of the Beatles' 1967 album Sgt. Pepper's Lonely Hearts Club Band.

Recording for "I'm the Greatest" took place in Los Angeles in March 1973, during a period when tensions among the former Beatles had eased. News of Starr, Lennon and Harrison working together led to heightened speculation in the press that the band might re-form. The presence on the recording of bassist Klaus Voormann, as a supposed stand-in for Paul McCartney, created a line-up that the press had dubbed the Ladders since 1971. The song was produced by Richard Perry and also includes musical contributions from Billy Preston, a keyboard player whose close links to the Beatles led to him being recognised as a Fifth Beatle.

Some commentators consider "I'm the Greatest" to be one of Starr's signature tunes. In his contemporaneous review for Rolling Stone, Ben Gerson praised it as a song on which "a stunning alchemy occurs"; author Peter Doggett likens the track to a "lost gem" from the Beatles' 1969 album Abbey Road. "I'm the Greatest" was later included on Starr's compilations Blast from Your Past (1975) and Photograph: The Very Best of Ringo Starr (2007). Starr has often performed it in concert with his All-Starr Band, whose second album, Live from Montreux (1993), opens with the song. A version from the 1973 recording session with Lennon on lead vocals appeared on the 1998 box set John Lennon Anthology.

== Background and inspiration ==
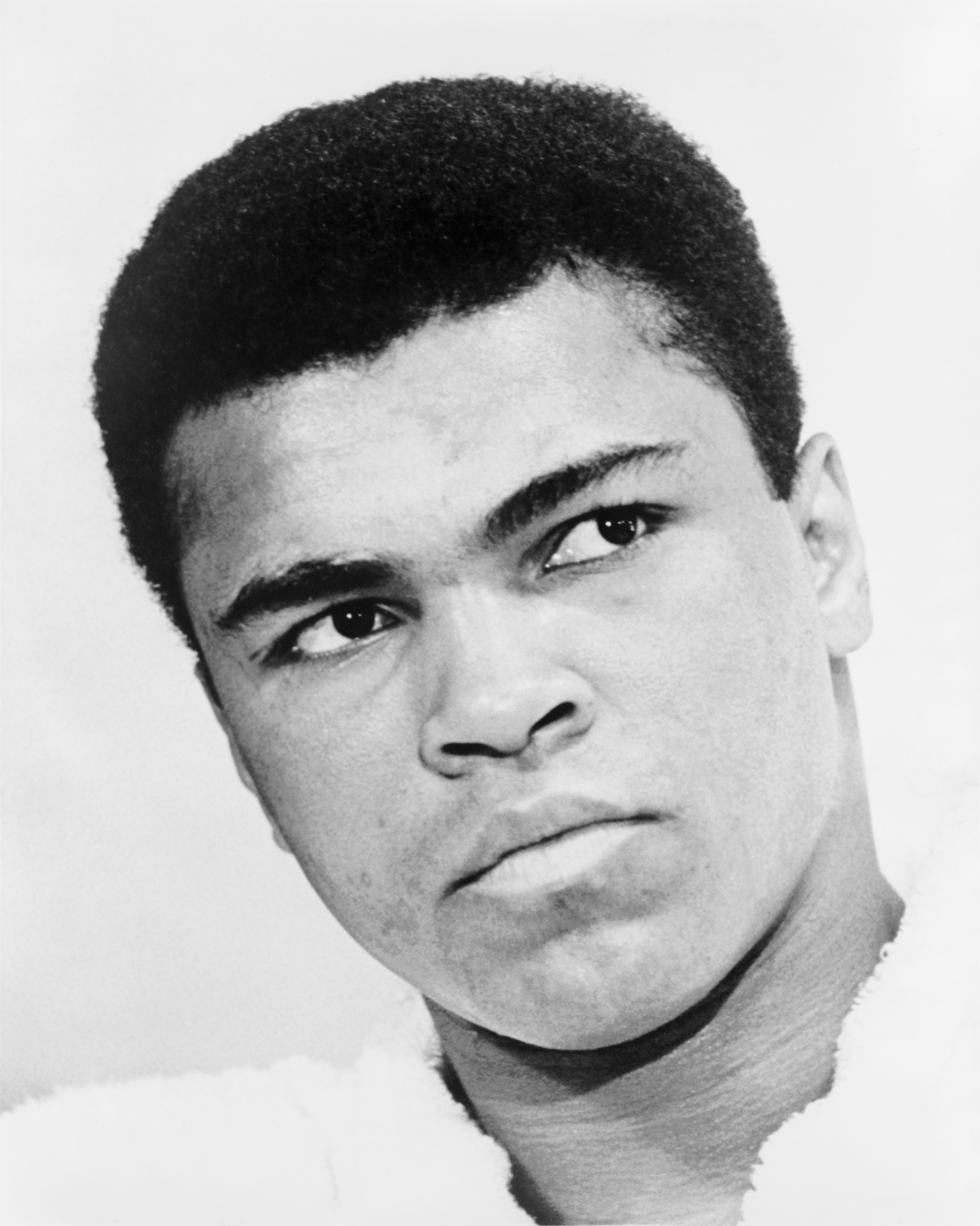
Lennon took the song's title from a saying adopted by boxer Muhammad Ali (pictured in 1967).

The Beatles broke up in April 1970, having achieved an unprecedented level of international fame for a musical act, and after helping to inspire many of the musical and cultural changes of the 1960s. In the eyes of the media and the public, the band members were divided into two factions: John Lennon, George Harrison and Ringo Starr, all of whom had opted to engage the services of Allen Klein to manage the group's Apple organisation in 1969; and Paul McCartney, whose isolationist stance had been interpreted as the reason for the break-up. On 28 December 1970, a week after learning that McCartney intended to sue his bandmates in the British High Court, Lennon began writing "I'm the Greatest". He was inspired to write the song after watching the first UK television broadcast of the Beatles' 1964 film A Hard Day's Night.

Through much of 1970, Lennon had undergone primal therapy with Arthur Janov, a process that unearthed in him long-suppressed feelings of resentment and inadequacy relating to his childhood. For Lennon, according to author Peter Doggett, viewing the Beatles' film in this context "felt like a postcard from a previous century: there he was, acting out the role that had become his life". He set about writing "I'm the Greatest" as a sarcastic comment on his past. Lennon took the song's title from a catchphrase adopted by boxer Muhammad Ali, whom the Beatles had met in February 1964, shortly before filming A Hard Day's Night.

"I'm the Greatest"? It's the Muhammad Ali line ... I couldn't sing it, but it was perfect for Ringo. He could say, "I'm the greatest" and people wouldn't get upset. Whereas if I said "I'm the greatest," they'd all take it so seriously.

— John Lennon, 1980

Working at his home studio at Tittenhurst Park, Lennon taped demos of the new composition and also of "Make Love Not War", a song he recorded formally as "Mind Games" in 1973. In July 1971, towards the end of the recording sessions for his Imagine album, Lennon taped another demo of "I'm the Greatest". He then put the composition aside until early 1973, when Starr approached his three former bandmates for songs to record for his first pop solo album, Ringo. (Note: Starr had been discouraged by the commercial failure of his album of country-and-western covers, Beaucoups of Blues, released in September 1970. Since then, his only musical releases had been two rock singles, "It Don't Come Easy" and "Back Off Boogaloo", both co-written with and produced by Harrison.) In response, Lennon tailored the track to suit Starr's perspective. Lennon later said that, although the song title was a well-known saying of Ali's, he did not feel he could sing it himself without attracting controversy, whereas "people wouldn't get upset" if the statement came from Starr. (Note: While stating his affection for the song, Starr echoed Lennon's contention, saying: "it's very tongue in cheek. Only he could have written it and only I could have sung it.") Lennon's wife, Yoko Ono, assisted in completing the lyrics, by contributing lines about Starr's wife and children.

== Composition ==
According to author and critic Bob Woffinden, in "I'm the Greatest", Lennon captures principal events in Starr's life "in affectionate terms". Woffinden adds that, by the early 1970s, Starr's perspective on the Beatles represented a more balanced view than any of his former bandmates'; he attributes this outlook to Starr's direction of the 1972 T. Rex concert documentary Born to Boogie, which allowed him to see at first hand the adulation afforded the band's leader, Marc Bolan. Lennon's lyrics remained partly autobiographical, however. He sings of growing up in Liverpool, his teenage years, falling in love for the first time, and "my wife and kids" in the present. In each case, he receives affirmation of his greatness – from his mother, his teenage peers, his lover, and his family. As part of what authors Ben Urish and Kenneth Bielen describe as the song's "sardonic take on the Beatles' experience", Lennon compares the international success of the band to "the greatest show on Earth" yet qualifies the claim with "For what it was worth".

The song is in a moderate tempo and in 4/4 time throughout. The musical key over the verses and two middle eight (or bridge) sections is B major, with frequent use of seventh chords. In the second bridge, the line "Yes, my name is Billy Shears" recalls Starr's alter-ego from the Beatles' 1967 album Sgt. Pepper's Lonely Hearts Club Band – specifically, the character named at the end of the album's title song and under which Starr sings the ensuing track, "With a Little Help from My Friends". In "I'm the Greatest", this section ends with a reference to Starr's age in early 1973: "Now I'm only thirty-two / And all I wanna do, is boogaloo ..." The word "boogaloo" was a pet phrase of Bolan, whose use of the term had inspired Starr to write "Back Off Boogaloo" in 1971.

In the chord sequence over the closing section – comprising a descending C-B-B♭-A pattern followed by a return to C using the same chords – the song quotes from the main hook of Harrison's track "I Dig Love", which Starr had played on three years before. On his version of "I'm the Greatest", Starr extemporises over this section, building on Ali's boastful claim. He concludes by declaring himself to be "the greatest – in this world, in the next world, and in any world!"

== Recording ==
=== Basic track ===
The sessions for Ringo coincided with a spirit of reconciliation among the four ex-Beatles. This was partly due to Starr, Lennon and Harrison's decision to sever their business ties with Allen Klein, whose control of Apple had been the cause of bitter division between them and McCartney. Klaus Voormann, a friend of the Beatles since their early years in Hamburg, also cites a willingness on the part of all the album's contributors to help Starr fully establish himself as a solo artist. With Richard Perry as his producer, Starr recorded the rhythm track for "I'm the Greatest" at Sunset Sound Recorders in Los Angeles on 13 March 1973. Lennon played on the session, as did Harrison, who was in Los Angeles for meetings relating to two upcoming Beatles compilations, 1962–1966 and 1967–1970, and to produce a new album by Ravi Shankar. Hearing that Starr and Lennon were working together, Harrison phoned the studio and asked Perry if he could attend. (Note: Harrison had already participated in the recording of two songs for Ringo: his composition "Sunshine Life for Me", and "Photograph", which he wrote with Starr.) Lennon said, "Hell yes ... Tell him to get down here right away and help me finish [writing] this bridge."

Just like that; no planning. The three ex-Beatles recorded one of John's songs. Everyone in the room was just gleaming ... it's such a universal gleam with The Beatles.

— Richard Perry, recalling the session for "I'm the Greatest"

The session for "I'm the Greatest" marked the first time that three former members of the Beatles had recorded together since the band's break-up. Perry later recalled the instinctive approach evident in the way the musicians worked together following Harrison's arrival; he described the atmosphere as "magic". (Note: In a 1977 interview, Starr said of the reunion with Lennon and Harrison: "We were like big girls again ... We hadn't played together in four years. We were just smiling while we were playing. It was nice.") The line-up on the basic track was Starr on drums, Lennon on piano and singing a guide vocal, Harrison on electric guitar, and Voormann on bass guitar.

Outtakes from the session, which later appeared on bootleg compilations, document the development of the song's rhythm track. While identifying this period as an artistic "malaise" for Lennon, following the failure of his and Ono's 1972 album Some Time in New York City, Urish and Bielen comment on the confidence he exhibits when directing the rehearsals. (Note: Partly out of shock at the poor response to Some Time in New York City, Lennon had not recorded any new songs of his own in the year between finishing that album and the session for "I'm the Greatest".) The line-up of musicians on "I'm the Greatest" matched that of a band rumoured to be known as the Ladders. According to reports in the UK music press in early 1971, such a group was to be a new incarnation of the Beatles, with Voormann replacing McCartney.

=== Overdubs ===
Starr subsequently recorded a lead vocal for the track, although part of Lennon's singing was retained, creating an occasional harmony beside Starr's vocal. Other overdubs included contributions from keyboardist Billy Preston, who was often referred to as a "Fifth Beatle" due to his close association with the band. In addition, Perry overdubbed the sound of an audience applauding Starr's mention of Billy Shears, providing a further quote from the Beatles' "Sgt. Pepper"/"With a Little Help from My Friends" medley. Harrison added more lead guitar parts, creating a guitar arrangement that author Simon Leng views as a "summary" of some his best-known contributions to the Beatles' work. These include, in Leng's description, "stabbing 'Get Back' rhythms" and "Help!"-style arpeggios, as well as a slide guitar solo that provides "an unexpected twist to the melody".

The press soon learned of the March 1973 collaboration, leading to heightened rumours regarding a full Beatles reunion, particularly in the UK. That same month, Starr announced that any such reunion was "absolutely out of the question". In October, by which point he had separated from Ono, Lennon told Chris Charlesworth of Melody Maker that the four ex-Beatles were "closer now than we have been for a long time" and there was "always a chance" of a temporary reunion. He added that McCartney would probably have played on "I'm the Greatest" also, had he been in Los Angeles at the time. (Note: Recalling the recording of "I'm the Greatest" in a 1980 interview, Lennon said he had enjoyed working again with Starr and Harrison, but was put off by Harrison and Preston's insistence that they should all form a band together.) Recognising the importance of the session with Lennon and Harrison, Starr decided to record McCartney's contribution to Ringo, "Six O'Clock", in London, to ensure that McCartney also appeared on the album.

== Release ==
Klaus Voormann's lithograph for "I'm the Greatest", included in the Ringo LP booklet

Apple Records issued Ringo on 2 November 1973 with "I'm the Greatest" sequenced as the opening track. Combined with the closing song, "You and Me (Babe)", written by Harrison and Mal Evans, "I'm the Greatest" provided the album with a loose concept in the form of a stage show. (Note: In "You and Me (Babe)", Starr addresses the audience in the manner of a show's compère. During his closing monologue, he individually thanks the many contributors on Ringo.) The same theme was reflected in the painting used for the LP cover, which showed the album title spelt out in bright lights on a theatre stage, and Voormann, Ono, Lennon, Harrison and Perry among the characters along the front row of the theatre's balcony. Among his lithographs appearing in the LP booklet, Voormann represented "I'm the Greatest" with an image of Starr as a statue, with his fist raised, towering high above an open space filled with minuscule figures. Recalling the release in 1981, Woffinden said the lithograph reflected the album's "quintessentially Ringo" quality, whereby Starr's gifts were revealed in his ability to unite his supposedly more talented colleagues. (Note: In his contemporary review for Disc magazine, Michael Benton admired Voormann's work as "superb". Author Robert Rodriguez pairs the image with that for "Oh My My", as highlights of the "appropriately imaginative" and "beautifully rendered" drawings supplied by Voormann.)

Helped by the speculation surrounding Starr's collaborations with his former bandmates, and by the interest generated by the two Beatles compilations, Ringo was a commercial success, overshadowing Lennon's concurrently released Mind Games. Acknowledging Starr's achievement, Lennon sent him a telegram that read: "Congratulations. How dare you? And please write me a hit song." Lennon pushed for "I'm the Greatest" to be issued as the third single off the album in the United States, but "Oh My My", written by Starr and Vini Poncia, was chosen instead.

"I'm the Greatest" appeared on Starr's Apple compilation album Blast from Your Past (1975), sequenced as the final track. The song was also included on his career-spanning compilation Photograph: The Very Best of Ringo Starr, released in 2007. A version with Lennon's lead vocals appeared on the 1998 box set John Lennon Anthology. This track was a composite of various takes from the 13 March session for the song.

== Critical reception and legacy ==
Writing in Rolling Stone, Ben Gershon remarked on the aptness of Starr's role as the catalyst for a conciliatory musical statement from the ex-Beatles. He highlighted "I'm the Greatest" as one of the album's three "most wonderful songs" and the track on which "a stunning alchemy occurs" due to the presence of Harrison and Lennon. Although less impressed with Ringo, Alan Betrock of Phonograph Record wrote that the song heralded Lennon's comeback as a writer, saying that after his recent overtly political work, "the gum chewing proverbial tongue-in-cheek rocker has returned with more of the old genius – and Ringo handles the song quite well." In his review for the NME, Charles Shaar Murray found that Lennon's composition "verges uncomfortably on self parody" with Starr left as "the butt of the joke, as he's the poor sod who's actually singing it". Amid his criticism of the lyrics, Shaar Murray said that the return of Billy Shears "complete with canned applause" suggested an attempt to "plug the musical holes in the album with large handfuls of charm and nostalgia".

"I'm the Greatest" is the only recording to feature the line-up known as the Ladders. Until Harrison's tribute to Lennon after the latter's murder in December 1980, "All Those Years Ago", and the surviving Beatles' reunion for their 1995 Anthology project, it was also the only song to feature more than two former members of the band after the group's break-up in 1970. In their 1975 book The Beatles: An Illustrated Record, Roy Carr and Tony Tyler said that together Lennon, Harrison, Starr, Voormann and Preston constituted what had been considered "the New Beatles" around the time of the break-up. With regard to "I'm the Greatest", they added: "Not surprisingly, it is the most Beatlesque cut on the album, with economical bass figures, jangling guitar arpeggios (and a wicked little flashback to 'Sgt Pepper' therein)." Peter Doggett writes that whereas Lennon's 1970 version had reflected his emotional pain and bitterness, once given to Starr the song became "a sardonic tribute to the Beatles" that "sounded like a lost gem from the Abbey Road sessions". While identifying Harrison's guitar arrangement as the main reason for its Beatle sound, Simon Leng cites "I'm the Greatest" as "the most compelling example" of the transformative effect that Harrison's contributions had on a Lennon or McCartney song.

"I'm the Greatest" is featured in Andrew Grant Jackson's book Still the Greatest: The Essential Solo Beatles Songs, where the author deems it to be the track that signalled the end of Starr's self-styled "album block". Writing in MusicHound Rock, Gary Pig Gold identifies it as Starr's "theme song" as a solo artist, typifying both his propensity for nostalgia and the all-star collaborations suggested by his "with a little help from his friends" approach. Gold also considers the song to be one of Lennon's "best, most sarcastic creations ever". In the 2005 publication NME Originals: Beatles – The Solo Years 1970–1980, Paul Moody included "I'm the Greatest" among the "ten solo gems" from Starr's career, describing it as a "Lennon-penned tribute to self-love" on which Harrison "weighs in with an electrifying lead guitar break". Music critic Tim Riley pairs the track with the Beatles' "With a Little Help from My Friends" as Starr's signature songs, while Ben Urish and Kenneth Bielen describe it as "a sequel of sorts" to "With a Little Help from My Friends", adding: "though not a monumental work, its humor and sense of fun recapture some of the true joy at the core of much of The Beatles' best work."

Starr has performed "I'm the Greatest" in concert on several of his tours with the All-Starr Band. It was the opening song throughout their 1992 North American and European tours, the last of which included a return to Liverpool for Starr's first concert in the city of his birth since the Beatles had played there in December 1965. A live version from this European tour, recorded at the Montreux Jazz Festival on 13 July 1992, appeared as the opening track of his album Ringo Starr and His All Starr Band Volume 2: Live from Montreux. Backed by the Roundheads, Starr played the song during his 2005 TV concert appearance for Soundstage, a performance that was released two years later on the album Ringo Starr: Live at Soundstage and on DVD in 2009. (Note: "I'm the Greatest" was also among the songs included in Starr's 1978 Ringo TV special. Working with Jimmy Webb, the music director of the special, Starr re-recorded the track for this program.)

== Personnel ==
According to authors Harry Castleman and Walter Podrazik:

- Ringo Starr – vocals, drums, percussion
- John Lennon – piano, backing vocal
- George Harrison – electric guitars, slide guitar
- Billy Preston – organ, electric piano
- Klaus Voormann – bass

== Sources ==
- Badman, Keith (2001). The Beatles Diary Volume 2: After the Break-Up 1970–2001. London: Omnibus Press. ISBN 978-0-7119-8307-6.
- Blaney, John (2005). John Lennon: Listen to This Book. Paper Jukebox. ISBN 978-0-9544528-1-0.
- Carr, Roy; Tyler, Tony (1978). The Beatles: An Illustrated Record. London: Trewin Copplestone Publishing. ISBN 0-450-04170-0.
- Castleman, Harry; Podrazik, Walter J. (1976). All Together Now: The First Complete Beatles Discography 1961–1975. New York, NY: Ballantine Books. ISBN 0-345-25680-8.
- Clayson, Alan (2003). Ringo Starr. London: Sanctuary. ISBN 1-86074-488-5.
- Doggett, Peter (2011). You Never Give Me Your Money: The Beatles After the Breakup. New York, NY: It Books. ISBN 978-0-06-177418-8.
- Graff, Gary; Durchholz, Daniel, eds. (1999). MusicHound Rock: The Essential Album Guide. Farmington Hills, MI: Visible Ink Press. ISBN 1-57859-061-2.
- Harry, Bill (2004). The Ringo Starr Encyclopedia. London: Virgin Books. ISBN 978-0-7535-0843-5.
- Hunt, Chris, ed. (2005). NME Originals: Beatles – The Solo Years 1970–1980. London: IPC Ignite!.
- Ingham, Chris (2006). The Rough Guide to the Beatles (2nd edn). London: Rough Guides/Penguin. ISBN 978-1-84836-525-4.
- Inglis, Ian (2010). The Words and Music of George Harrison. Santa Barbara, CA: Praeger. ISBN 978-0-313-37532-3.
- Jackson, Andrew Grant (2012). Still the Greatest: The Essential Solo Beatles Songs. Lanham, MD: Scarecrow Press. ISBN 978-0-8108-8222-5.
- Leng, Simon (2006). While My Guitar Gently Weeps: The Music of George Harrison. Milwaukee, WI: Hal Leonard. ISBN 978-1-4234-0609-9.
- Madinger, Chip; Easter, Mark (2000). Eight Arms to Hold You: The Solo Beatles Compendium. Chesterfield, MO: 44.1 Productions. ISBN 0-615-11724-4.
- Riley, Tim (2011). Lennon: The Man, the Myth, the Music – The Definitive Life. London: Random House. ISBN 978-0-7535-4020-6.
- Rodriguez, Robert (2010). Fab Four FAQ 2.0: The Beatles' Solo Years, 1970–1980. Milwaukee, WI: Backbeat Books. ISBN 978-1-4165-9093-4.
- Rodriguez, Robert (2013). Solo in the 70s: John, Paul, George, Ringo: 1970–1980. Downers Grove, IL: Parading Press. ISBN 978-0-9892555-0-9.
- Romanowski, Patricia; George-Warren, Holly, eds. (1995). The New Rolling Stone Encyclopedia of Rock & Roll. New York, NY: Fireside/Rolling Stone Press. ISBN 0-684-81044-1.
- Schaffner, Nicholas (1978). The Beatles Forever. New York, NY: McGraw-Hill. ISBN 0-07-055087-5.
- Sheff, David (2000) [1981]. All We Are Saying: The Last Major Interview with John Lennon and Yoko Ono. New York, NY: St. Martin's Press. ISBN 0-312-25464-4.
- Snow, Mat (2013). The Beatles Solo: The Illustrated Chronicles of John, Paul, George, and Ringo After The Beatles (Volume 4: Ringo). New York, NY: Race Point Publishing. ISBN 978-1-937994-26-6.
- Spizer, Bruce (2005). The Beatles Solo on Apple Records. New Orleans, LA: 498 Productions. ISBN 0-9662649-5-9.
- Sutherland, Steve, ed. (2003). NME Originals: Lennon. London: IPC Ignite!.
- Urish, Ben; Bielen, Kenneth G. (2007). The Words and Music of John Lennon. Westport, CT: Praeger. ISBN 978-0-275-99180-7.
- Woffinden, Bob (1981). The Beatles Apart. London: Proteus. ISBN 0-906071-89-5.
- Womack, Kenneth (2007). Long and Winding Roads: The Evolving Artistry of the Beatles. New York, NY: Continuum. ISBN 978-0-8264-1746-6.
