= You and Me (Babe) =

Song by Ringo Starr

from the album Ringo
- Released: 2 November 1973
- Genre: Rock, pop
- Length: 4:59
- Label: Apple
- Songwriter(s): George Harrison, Mal Evans
- Producer(s): Richard Perry

"You and Me (Babe)" is a song by the English musician Ringo Starr, released as the final track on his 1973 album Ringo. Starr's fellow ex-Beatle George Harrison wrote the song along with Mal Evans, the Beatles' longtime aide and a personal assistant to Starr during the making of Ringo. The track serves as a farewell from Starr to his audience in the manner of a show-closing finale, by lyrically referring to the completion of the album. During the extended fadeout, Starr delivers a spoken message in which he thanks the musicians and studio personnel who helped with the recording of Ringo – among them, Harrison, John Lennon and Paul McCartney, and his producer, Richard Perry.

The recording of "You and Me (Babe)" features a series of well-regarded guitar solos from Harrison, and backing from musicians such as Nicky Hopkins and Klaus Voormann. Jack Nitzsche and Tom Scott contributed the song's musical arrangements.

== Background ==
A friend of the Beatles since 1960, German musician and artist Klaus Voormann has suggested that Ringo Starr's first rock solo album, Ringo, elicited a Concert for Bangladesh-style spirit of goodwill from Starr's key collaborators on the project. In addition to Starr's former Beatles bandmates and Voormann, the participants included Mal Evans, originally a roadie for the group and, by the late 1960s, an occasional lyricist, Apple Records A&R scout, and music producer. (Note: One of the Beatles' closest aides, Evans briefly ran their Apple record label in 1968. Among his credits on Apple's releases, Evans produced various songs by Badfinger, including part of their soundtrack for Starr's movie The Magic Christian (1969) and the 1970 single "No Matter What", as well as co-producing "New Day" by Jackie Lomax, and the Elastic Oz Band's 1971 Oz magazine benefit single, "God Save Us". Later in the 1970s, Evans co-produced a solo album by Who drummer Keith Moon, Two Sides of the Moon (1975), released on Track Records.) Evans also managed Splinter, a South Shields duo who began working with George Harrison in early 1973, initially on the soundtrack for Apple Films' Little Malcolm. In March that year, when sessions for Ringo were under way in Hollywood, Harrison and Evans shared a house in Los Angeles and co-wrote a song for Starr's album, titled "You and Me (Babe)". Evans had some lyrics for what he termed "a meditation song", and asked Harrison for help with the melody, after which Harrison reworked the composition on a piano.

Author Robert Rodriguez views Harrison's role in finishing "You and Me (Babe)" as "[a]ssisting the nascent songwriting career" of Evans, who co-wrote Splinter's "Lonely Man" around this time. Evans had also provided uncredited assistance to Paul McCartney in 1967 on song lyrics for the Beatles' Sgt. Pepper's Lonely Hearts Club Band album. (Note: According to Beatles biographer Ian MacDonald, it was Evans who came up with that album's title, to serve as an alternative persona for the band.)

== Composition ==
Beatles biographer Nicholas Schaffner describes the song as "a showbizzy send-off". The lyrics allow Starr to farewell the listener, as he sings of having enjoyed entertaining them, "But it's getting late and it's time to leave." Author Ian Inglis comments on the similarity between "You and Me (Babe)" and the Beatles songs "Sgt. Pepper's Lonely Hearts Club Band" and "Good Night", through its incorporation of a songwriting device whereby the performer directly addresses his audience. Musicologist Thomas MacFarlane similarly recognises the song as a musical example of breaking the fourth wall, particularly during the long coda.

In the two middle eights, the lyrics refer to the convivial atmosphere that was a feature of the Los Angeles sessions for Ringo. Starr concludes the second middle eight with a message to LP listeners, saying that despite the performance being over, he remains "Right here on this record spinning round, with the sound …"

Another reference to the album comes in Starr's spoken line during the coda: "Well, it's the end of the night and I'd just like to say thank you to everyone involved in this piece of plastic we're making ..." He then names three of the main session musicians on Ringo – fellow drummer Jim Keltner, Voormann and keyboard player Nicky Hopkins – before similarly thanking Harrison, ex-Beatles John Lennon and McCartney, producer Richard Perry, sound engineer Bill Schnee, and songwriter Vini Poncia. He concludes the list by signing off as Ringo Starr. In MacFarlane's description, these closing acknowledgments provide the sonic equivalent of credits rolling on screen at the end of a "classic Hollywood film".

== Recording ==
After arriving in Los Angeles from London for a Beatles-related business meeting on 10 March 1973, Harrison admitted to being "knocked out" by the quality of the demos Starr had recorded at Sunset Sound Recorders over the previous week. Harrison played on Lennon's contribution, "I'm the Greatest", and participated in the recording of two songs he himself had written or co-written for Starr's album: "Photograph" and "Sunshine Life for Me". The basic track for "You and Me (Babe)" was also taped during these sessions, which lasted until 27 March. The line-up of musicians included Starr (drums), Harrison (electric guitar), Hopkins (electric piano), Poncia (acoustic guitar) and Voormann (bass). Harrison's soloing provides what author Alan Clayson terms "a deft fretboard obligato" throughout the recording, encouraged by Starr's spoken "Come on, lads – play it for me, boys" at the start of the playout.

Overdubs on the basic track included a marimba part, played by percussionist Milt Holland. Underlining the song's role as a show finale, "You and Me (Babe)" also received orchestral string and horn overdubs. The horn parts, played and arranged by Tom Scott, were recorded at Sunset Sound on 12 May, while Jack Nitzsche added orchestration to the song on 29 June, at Warner Bros. Records' Burbank studio.

== Release ==
Apple Records released Ringo in November 1973, with "You and Me (Babe)" sequenced as the final track, following the Starr–Poncia composition "Devil Woman". Combined with the album opener, "I'm the Greatest", in which Starr reprised his Billy Shears persona from Sgt. Pepper, the song suggested a loose conceptual framework for Ringo in the manner of the Beatles' 1967 LP. (Note: MacFarlane comments that through these two songs, Harrison and Lennon each advance such an overarching concept, whereas McCartney's sole writing contribution, the ballad "Six O'Clock", sees him "relegated to a supporting role" on Ringo.) According to authors Chip Madinger and Mark Easter, "You and Me (Babe)" was briefly considered for release as a single.

The album was a commercial and critical success, as reviewers praised Starr's achievement in coaxing quality contributions from his former bandmates without his personality being lost in the process. The closing monologue in "You and Me (Babe)" conveyed the spirit of collaboration among the former Beatles, nearly four years after their break-up, although on no single track did they all participate. (Note: Following Starr's example, Harrison used the fourth wall-defying device on several of his recordings, starting with the 1974 song "Far East Man". Over that track's introduction, he intones a dedication to Frank Sinatra and hopes that Sinatra covers the song at his next Las Vegas concert engagement.)

In 1975, London-based recording engineer David Hentschel covered "You and Me (Babe)", along with all the other tracks on Ringo, for his album Sta*rtling Music. An experimental work featuring Hentschel on ARP synthesizer, the album was one of the first releases on Starr's short-lived record label, Ring O' Records.

== Critical reception ==
In his contemporaneous review for Rolling Stone, Ben Gerson wrote of the song: "It is the infectious 'You and Me (Babe),' Ringo's final song, into which all the bittersweet [Beatles] reunion sentiments pour. George on this cut plays better than he has in years; his uncanny knack for peeling away the harmonies and realigning them is fully with him here. He keeps cooking well into the fade-out." Gerson listed the track among the album's "three most wonderful songs", along with "I'm the Greatest" and "Photograph".

NME critic Bob Woffinden remarked on the album's loose concept as a stage show, due to "I'm the Greatest" and "You and Me (Babe)" "effectively open[ing] and clos[ing] proceedings" together with the inclusion of "Ringo's name in lights" on the Sgt. Pepper-like LP cover. Alan Betrock of Phonograph Record described "You and Me (Babe)" as a "fine" song and a "suitable finish", saying that it combined "Good Night" with elements from the Rolling Stones' "Something Happened to Me Yesterday". He welcomed these and other "throwbacks" on Ringo as a sign that the former Beatles had "learned to live with their past" and were now free of the negativity and resentment that had occasionally surfaced in their lyrics, artwork and legal actions.

Beatles historian Bruce Spizer views the song as "the perfect closer" for Ringo and compares it with the similarly effective "Good Night", sung by Starr in 1968 to close the Beatles' White Album. Robert Rodriguez describes it as "slick" and "a rather syrupy lounge band impression", redeemed by "one of [Harrison's] sharper post-Beatles solos".

Among Harrison biographers, Elliot Huntley dismisses the song for its show tune qualities, describing it as "syrupy", while Simon Leng views the composition as a "corny effort" that "trades on Starr's chummy stage persona" and pales alongside the "effortless pop craft" of "Photograph". Leng concludes of "You and Me (Babe)": "Here Harrison was writing with a specific singer in mind, and the song reveals nothing other than his ability to write to order." Ian Inglis welcomes the song's "warm and positive message" and views its reprise of the Beatles' technique of directly addressing the listener as a "great success".

== Personnel ==
- Ringo Starr – vocals, drums, percussion
- George Harrison – electric guitars
- Nicky Hopkins – electric piano
- Vini Poncia – acoustic guitar
- Klaus Voormann – bass
- Milt Holland – marimba
- Tom Scott – saxophones, horn arrangement
- Jack Nitzsche – string arrangement

== Sources ==
- Keith Badman, The Beatles Diary Volume 2: After the Break-Up 1970–2001, Omnibus Press (London, 2001; ISBN 0-7119-8307-0).
- Roy Carr & Tony Tyler, The Beatles: An Illustrated Record, Trewin Copplestone Publishing (London, 1978; ISBN 0-450-04170-0).
- Harry Castleman & Walter J. Podrazik, All Together Now: The First Complete Beatles Discography 1961–1975, Ballantine Books (New York, NY, 1976; ISBN 0-345-25680-8).
- Alan Clayson, Ringo Starr, Sanctuary (London, 2003; ISBN 1-86074-488-5).
- Peter Doggett, You Never Give Me Your Money: The Beatles After the Breakup, It Books (New York, NY, 2011; ISBN 978-0-06-177418-8).
- Michael Frontani, "The Solo Years", in Kenneth Womack (ed.), The Cambridge Companion to the Beatles, Cambridge University Press (Cambridge, UK, 2009; ISBN 978-1-139-82806-2), pp. 153–82.
- Elliot J. Huntley, Mystical One: George Harrison – After the Break-up of the Beatles, Guernica Editions (Toronto, ON, 2006; ISBN 1-55071-197-0).
- Ian Inglis, The Words and Music of George Harrison, Praeger (Santa Barbara, CA, 2010; ISBN 978-0-313-37532-3).
- Simon Leng, While My Guitar Gently Weeps: The Music of George Harrison, Hal Leonard (Milwaukee, WI, 2006; ISBN 1-4234-0609-5).
- Ian MacDonald, Revolution in the Head: The Beatles' Records and the Sixties, Pimlico (London, 1998; ISBN 0-7126-6697-4).
- Thomas MacFarlane, The Music of George Harrison, Routledge (Abingdon, UK, 2019; ISBN 978-1-138-59910-9).
- Chip Madinger & Mark Easter, Eight Arms to Hold You: The Solo Beatles Compendium, 44.1 Productions (Chesterfield, MO, 2000; ISBN 0-615-11724-4).
- Chris O'Dell (with Katherine Ketcham), Miss O'Dell: My Hard Days and Long Nights with The Beatles, The Stones, Bob Dylan, Eric Clapton, and the Women They Loved, Touchstone (New York, NY, 2009; ISBN 978-1-4165-9093-4).
- Robert Rodriguez, Fab Four FAQ 2.0: The Beatles' Solo Years, 1970–1980, Backbeat Books (Milwaukee, WI, 2010; ISBN 978-1-4165-9093-4).
- Nicholas Schaffner, The Beatles Forever, McGraw-Hill (New York, NY, 1978; ISBN 0-07-055087-5).
- Bruce Spizer, The Beatles Solo on Apple Records, 498 Productions (New Orleans, LA, 2005; ISBN 0-9662649-5-9).
- Bob Woffinden, The Beatles Apart, Proteus (London, 1981; ISBN 0-906071-89-5).
