= Six O'Clock =

Song by Ringo Starr

from the album Ringo
- Released: 2 November 1973
- Genre: Pop
- Length: 4:05; 5:26 (extended)
- Label: Apple
- Songwriters: Paul McCartney, Linda McCartney
- Producer: Richard Perry

"Six O'Clock" is a song by the English rock musician Ringo Starr from his 1973 album Ringo. It was written by Starr's former Beatles bandmate Paul McCartney and the latter's wife, Linda, who also participated in the recording of the song. It was the first time McCartney and Starr had worked together since the Beatles' break-up in 1970. Their collaboration reflected an easing of the tensions that had existed between the two musicians for much of that period.

Produced by Richard Perry, "Six O'Clock" was recorded mainly at Apple Studios in London in April 1973. Following Starr's recent collaborations with George Harrison and John Lennon in Los Angeles, the session with McCartney added to speculation in the press that the Beatles were about to reunite. An extended version of the song appeared as a bonus track on the 1992 CD release of Starr's Goodnight Vienna album.

== Background and composition ==
"Six o'clock in the morning/You've just gone to sleep." Paul wrote that. See, they knew me so well, they would write songs that they felt I could get away with.

— Ringo Starr, 2001

Paul McCartney wrote "Six O'Clock" in response to a request from Ringo Starr, his former bandmate in the Beatles, for a contribution to his first rock solo album, titled Ringo. Having agreed to attend the Grammy Awards ceremony in Nashville on 3 March 1973, Starr had begun compiling possible material for the album with Richard Perry, his producer, with a plan to record in Los Angeles during the same visit to the United States. Although Starr's relationship with McCartney had been strained by the effects of the Beatles' break-up in 1970, and by McCartney's subsequent lawsuit against his three former bandmates, Starr said in late 1972 that relations among the ex-Beatles were "a lot better now … we're together as people [if not as a band], and that's more important really." Once George Harrison and John Lennon had each agreed to contribute songs for Ringo, Starr was able to persuade McCartney by telling him: "You don't want to be left out, do you?"

The song was credited to McCartney and his wife Linda. The composition is a pop piano ballad in a style that author Bruce Spizer views as typical of the contemporary music of the McCartneys' new group, Wings, whose album Red Rose Speedway they had just completed. In a 2001 interview, Starr nevertheless cited "Six O'Clock" as an example of how his former bandmates always supplied him with material that suited his personality. The song's lyrics address a friend or lover whom the singer confesses to not showing enough attention towards. The repeated refrain "I don't treat you like I should" serves as an extended coda, anticipating a similar reprise in McCartney and Starr's 1997 collaboration "Beautiful Night".

== Recording ==
Starr recorded eight of the ten rhythm tracks for Ringo in Los Angeles during March 1973, with guest musicians including Harrison, Lennon, Harry Nilsson, the Band, Marc Bolan, Billy Preston and Nicky Hopkins. Among the recordings was "I'm the Greatest", which featured both Lennon and Harrison; a highly publicised session at the time, it marked the first occasion that three former Beatles had worked together since the band's break-up. Recognising the importance of this, Starr decided to record "Six O'Clock" in London to ensure McCartney's participation on the album. (Note: During this period, McCartney was preparing for Wings' first major tour, and his recent drugs conviction prevented him from entering America. In addition, according to author Robert Rodriguez, McCartney was most likely keen to avoid meeting up with Lennon and Harrison until they had formally severed ties with their manager, Allen Klein.) The session was arranged to coincide with Starr's return to the UK for the world premiere of That'll Be the Day, a film in which he had a starring role. In addition, Perry was due to advise on the music soundtrack for the Wings television special James Paul McCartney, which McCartney had agreed to do to appease music publisher Lew Grade's concerns about the legitimacy of Linda's songwriting credits. (Note: Grade owned both the British ATV network, which produced the special, and ATV Music Publishing, which had acquired the Beatles' Northern Songs publishing company in 1969. Citing Linda's lack of credentials as a musician and songwriter, Grade had sued McCartney in 1971 on the grounds that the joint writing credit was a ruse that denied ATV the second composer's publishing royalties.)

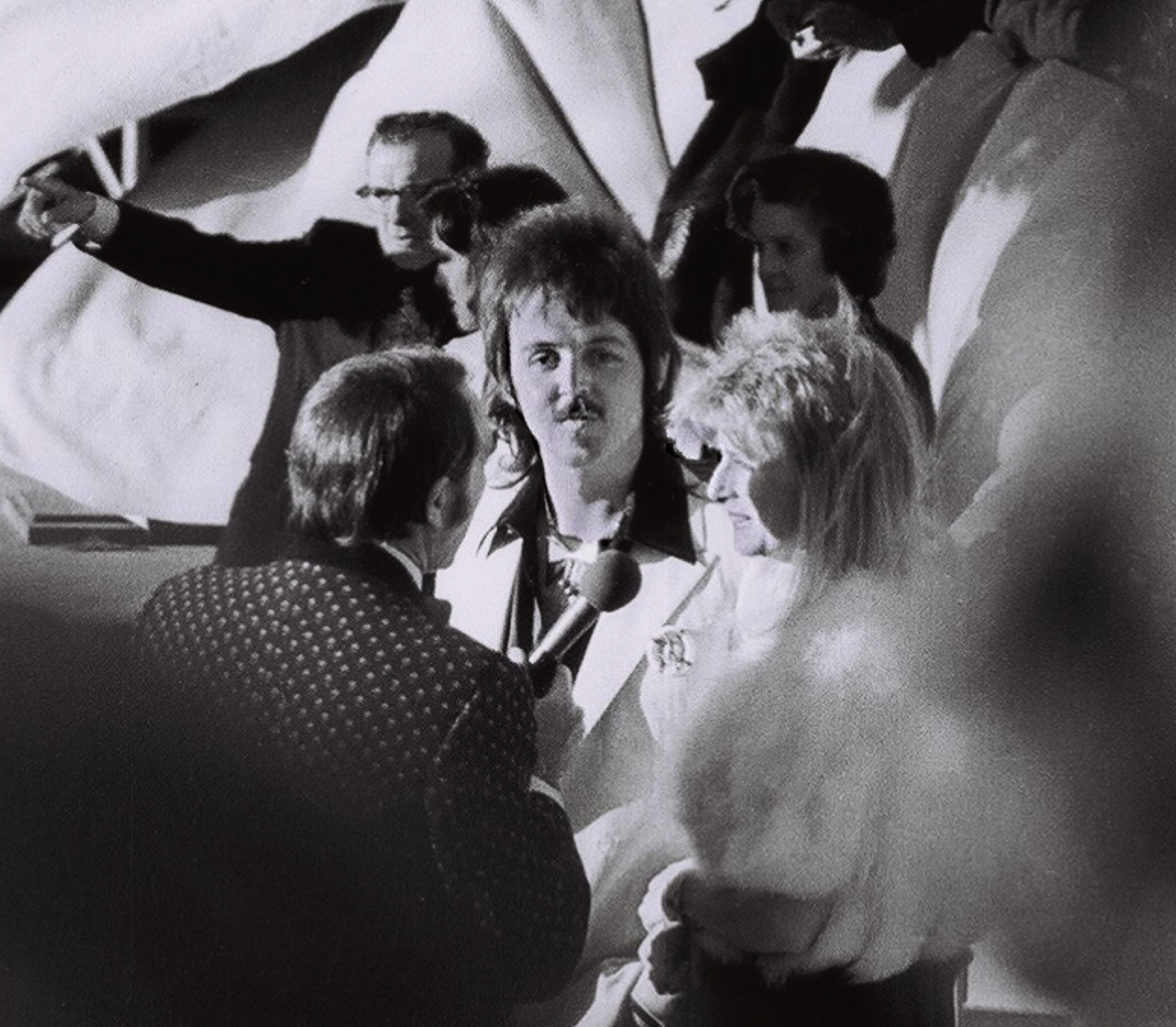
Paul and Linda McCartney at the 1974 Academy Awards. McCartney's participation in the recording of "Six O'Clock" ensured that all four former Beatles appeared on Starr's 1973 solo album.

Starr attended the premiere of That'll Be the Day on 12 April, with the McCartneys, and then recorded the song's rhythm track on 16 April at the Beatles' Apple Studios. Besides Starr, on drums and lead vocals, McCartney played piano and synthesizer, and sang backing vocals with Linda. The other musicians on the track were bassist Klaus Voormann – whose presence on "I'm the Greatest" had reignited rumours that he was to stand in for McCartney in a partial Beatles reunion – and Vince Poncia, who played acoustic guitar and percussion. Fifteen takes of the song were taped, with recording finishing at 6 am. Late in the session, Perry played back some of the Los Angeles recordings; McCartney then vocalised a kazoo-like solo (credited as "mouth sax") on Starr's cover of the 1960 Johnny Burnette hit "You're Sixteen", and Starr overdubbed the sound of his own tap-dancing onto his composition "Step Lightly". Further work was carried out on "Six O'Clock" at EMI's Abbey Road Studios, as part of what Perry later described as "two or three wonderful nights" of recording in London. Flutes and strings were added to the song, with McCartney providing the arrangement.

News of Starr and McCartney recording together added to the media speculation that the Beatles might re-form. While filming James Paul McCartney at Elstree Studios, McCartney had said that he saw "no real reason why we shouldn't get together again" once Lennon, Harrison and Starr had removed Allen Klein from his position as manager of Apple Corps, which they did on 31 March. When fending off the reunion rumours during Wings' UK tour, in May 1973, McCartney said that writing the song and recording with Starr had merely been an act of friendship, adding: "I would do it for any friend." (Note: As an example, McCartney stated he would do the same for singer Rod Stewart "if he rang up" – a comment that led to Stewart phoning him and requesting a song. McCartney duly wrote "Mine for Me", which he and Linda recorded with Stewart for the latter's 1974 album Smiler.)

== Release ==
Apple Records released Ringo on 2 November 1973, with "Six O'Clock" appearing as the album's eighth track, between "Step Lightly" and the Starr–Poncia composition "Devil Woman". Helped by news of Starr having recorded with each of his former bandmates, and the popularity of the single "Photograph", written by Starr and Harrison, the album was a commercial and critical success. The release was closely followed by that of Wings' Band on the Run album, which gained critical acclaim for McCartney for the first time as a solo artist.

The original mix of "Six O'Clock" extended to 5:26 due to the inclusion of the reprise-like coda, yet this portion was subsequently cut, reducing the track length to 4:05. While the LP face label for the US commercial release mistakenly gave the pre-edit length, the extended version of the song appeared only on promotional copies of Ringo and on some pressings in the cassette and 8-track cartridge formats. (Note: The Mexican LP used the 5:26 version, however, since pressings there were taken from the original master tape.) This full version of the song was included as a bonus track on the CD release of Starr's 1974 album Goodnight Vienna, issued in November 1992.

== Critical reception ==
In his album review for Rolling Stone, Ben Gerson wrote of "Six O'Clock" having "a certain slight charm" but rued its lack of "collaborative feeling" next to the contributions from Harrison and Lennon. Gerson concluded that Starr was "merely grafted onto a typical McCartney confection". In the NME, Charles Shaar Murray derided Ringo as "an album that should be purchased only by those who wish to go to extraordinary lengths to indulge their nostalgia for the Beatles", and he dismissed McCartney's composition as "well below form". More impressed, Alan Betrock of Phonograph Record wrote: "Paul McCartney's 'Six O'Clock' would have been a perfect chart-topper for himself and Wings, possibly rivaling 'Yesterday' in worldwide stature. McCartney's patented string arrangement is refreshing to hear, offering a nice counterpart to Richard Perry's often overdone backgrounds. Perhaps 'Six O'Clock' is a bit too drawn out, but it still comes off quite nicely." In his review for Disc magazine, Michael Benton described the song as "a mixture of sugar sweet lyrics and gentle music".

In his 1977 book The Beatles Forever, Nicholas Schaffner admired Starr for bringing out the best in his collaborators, which in McCartney's case "produce[d] the strongest, most lyrical pop ballad he had composed since 'The Long and Winding Road'". Writing in 1981, NME critic Bob Woffinden similarly opined that Starr's strength of character had ensured that the Beatles' past differences were forgotten, resulting in his three former bandmates providing "excellent compositions", with "Six O'Clock" "distinguished by a lovely melody".

Among more recent commentators, former Mojo editor Mat Snow considers that whereas Harrison and Lennon "did their old buddy proud" on Ringo, McCartney's offering was "so weak that Ringo's rumbustious 'Devil Woman' beat it for intrigue and excitement". Alan Clayson identifies the "snotty synthesiser ostinato" as the song's most salient feature, adding: "'Six O'Clock' could have been made up by McCartney in his sleep. It was certainly commensurate with the wispy lyrics and syrupy jingles that comprised Red Rose Speedway, Wings' 1973 album." Conversely, Tim Riley describes the song as "a standout track", while Robert Rodriguez views it as "a catchy ballad" that would have been "unremarkable" if issued by McCartney, yet it became a "stellar" track in Starr's version.

In 1975, London-based recording engineer David Hentschel covered "Six O'Clock", along with all the other tracks on Ringo, for his album Sta*rtling Music. An experimental work featuring Hentschel on ARP synthesizer, the album was one of the first releases on Starr's short-lived record label, Ring O' Records.

== Personnel ==
According to Bruce Spizer:

- Ringo Starr – vocals, drums
- Paul McCartney – piano, synthesizer, backing vocal, flute and string arrangements
- Vini Poncia – acoustic guitar, percussion
- Klaus Voormann – bass
- Linda McCartney – backing vocal

== Sources ==
- Keith Badman, The Beatles Diary Volume 2: After the Break-Up 1970–2001, Omnibus Press (London, 2001; ISBN 0-7119-8307-0).
- Harry Castleman & Walter J. Podrazik, All Together Now: The First Complete Beatles Discography 1961–1975, Ballantine Books (New York, NY, 1976; ISBN 0-345-25680-8).
- Alan Clayson, Ringo Starr, Sanctuary (London, 2003; ISBN 1-86074-488-5).
- Peter Doggett, You Never Give Me Your Money: The Beatles After the Breakup, It Books (New York, NY, 2011; ISBN 978-0-06-177418-8).
- Bill Harry, The Ringo Starr Encyclopedia, Virgin Books (London, 2004; ISBN 978-0-7535-0843-5).
- Chris Hunt (ed.), NME Originals: Beatles – The Solo Years 1970–1980, IPC Ignite! (London, 2005).
- Chris Ingham, The Rough Guide to the Beatles, Rough Guides/Penguin (London, 2006; 2nd edn; ISBN 978-1-8483-6525-4).
- Andrew Grant Jackson, Still the Greatest: The Essential Solo Beatles Songs, Scarecrow Press (Lanham, MD, 2012; ISBN 978-0-8108-8222-5).
- Chip Madinger & Mark Easter, Eight Arms to Hold You: The Solo Beatles Compendium, 44.1 Productions (Chesterfield, MO, 2000; ISBN 0-615-11724-4).
- Tim Riley, Lennon: The Man, the Myth, the Music – The Definitive Life, Random House (London, 2011; ISBN 978-0-7535-4020-6).
- Robert Rodriguez, Fab Four FAQ 2.0: The Beatles' Solo Years, 1970–1980, Backbeat Books (Milwaukee, WI, 2010; ISBN 978-1-4165-9093-4).
- Nicholas Schaffner, The Beatles Forever, McGraw-Hill (New York, NY, 1978; ISBN 0-07-055087-5).
- Mat Snow, The Beatles Solo: The Illustrated Chronicles of John, Paul, George, and Ringo After The Beatles (Volume 4: Ringo), Race Point Publishing (New York, NY, 2013; ISBN 978-1-937994-26-6).
- Howard Sounes, Fab: An Intimate Life of Paul McCartney, HarperCollins (London, 2010; ISBN 978-0-00-723705-0).
- Bruce Spizer, The Beatles Solo on Apple Records, 498 Productions (New Orleans, LA, 2005; ISBN 0-9662649-5-9).
- Bob Woffinden, The Beatles Apart, Proteus (London, 1981; ISBN 0-906071-89-5).
