= Photograph (Ringo Starr song) =

- UK picture sleeve

Single by Ringo Starr

from the album Ringo
- B-side: "Down and Out"
- Released: 24 September 1973
- Genre: Rock; pop
- Length: 4:00
- Label: Apple
- Songwriters: Richard Starkey; George Harrison
- Producer: Richard Perry

Ringo Starr singles chronology
"Back Off Boogaloo" (1972)	"Photograph" (1973)	"You're Sixteen" (1974)

Official audio
- "Photograph" on YouTube

"Photograph" is a song by English rock musician Ringo Starr that was released as the lead single from his 1973 album Ringo. Starr co-wrote it with George Harrison, his former bandmate from the Beatles. Although they collaborated on other songs, it is the only one officially credited to the pair. A signature tune for Starr as a solo artist, "Photograph" was an international hit, topping singles charts in the United States, Canada and Australia, and receiving gold disc certification for US sales of 1 million. Music critics have similarly received the song favourably; Stephen Thomas Erlewine of AllMusic considers it to be "among the very best post-Beatles songs by any of the Fab Four".

The lyrics are a reflection on lost love, whereby a photograph is the only reminder of the protagonists' shared past. Starr and Harrison began writing the song in the South of France in 1971, during a period when Starr was focused on developing his acting career. They first recorded "Photograph" late the following year, along with the single's B-side, "Down and Out", during the sessions for Harrison's Living in the Material World album. The officially released version was recorded in Los Angeles with producer Richard Perry. It incorporates aspects of Phil Spector's Wall of Sound through the presence of multiple drums and acoustic guitars, as well as an orchestra and a choir. Aside from Starr and Harrison, the musicians on the recording include Nicky Hopkins, Bobby Keys, Jim Keltner, and Spector's musical arranger, Jack Nitzsche. Starr made a promotional film for the single, shot at his and wife Maureen Starkey's home, Tittenhurst Park.

"Photograph" has appeared on Starr's compilation albums Blast from Your Past and Photograph: The Very Best of Ringo Starr, and live versions have featured on releases recorded with his All-Starr Band and with the Roundheads. In November 2002, a year after Harrison's death, Starr stated “the meaning has changed now of course” before performing "Photograph" at the Concert for George – a performance that was an emotional highpoint of the event. Engelbert Humperdinck, Camper Van Beethoven, Cilla Black and Adam Sandler are among the artists who have covered the song.

== Background and composition ==
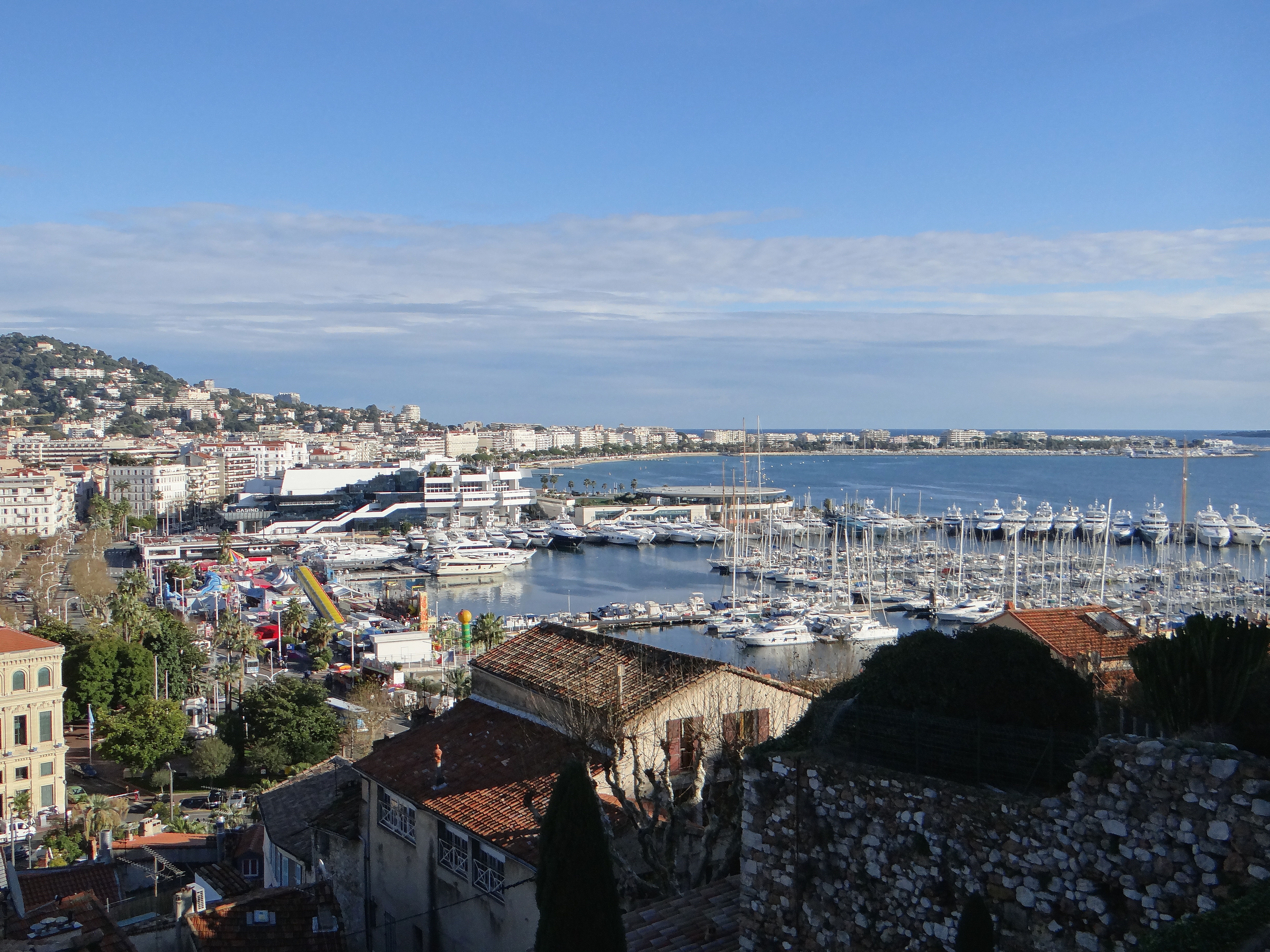
View of Cannes from Le Suquet. Starr and Harrison began writing the song on a yacht hired for the 1971 Cannes Film Festival.

Ex-Beatles Ringo Starr and George Harrison began writing "Photograph" on a luxury yacht in the South of France in May 1971. Starr had hired a yacht, the Marala, for the duration of the Cannes Film Festival, after attending Mick Jagger's wedding in St Tropez with his wife, Maureen Starkey. The Starkeys (Note: Starr's real name is Richard Starkey.) were then joined in France by Harrison and the latter's wife, Pattie Boyd, for the Monaco Grand Prix. This period coincided with Starr's first success as a solo artist, with the Harrison-produced single "It Don't Come Easy", although he continued to focus on his career as a film actor, beginning with a role in Blindman (1971). (Note: Some sources claim that "Photograph" originated in Almeria, Spain, where Starr was filming Blindman, yet his role in that film was only confirmed at the end of the Cannes Film Festival. According to entries in Keith Badman's book The Beatles Diary Volume 2, Starr joined the production in Rome on 17 June before carrying out location filming in Almeria through July.)

Another guest on the Marala was Cilla Black, singer and a friend of the Beatles since the 1960s. She recalled Starr and Harrison playing "Photograph" during an evening get-together, with "everyone on board" contributing ideas for the lyrics. As with Starr's two singles over 1971–72, "It Don't Come Easy" and "Back Off Boogaloo", Harrison helped write the melody, although "Photograph" marked the first time that he was credited as a co-writer with Starr. In her autobiography, Step Inside Love, Black says she had hoped to record the song for a single later in 1971, only to be told by Starr: "No, it's too bloody good for you. I'm having it myself."

The lyrics to "Photograph" are centred around lost love, with the singer having only a single picture by which to remember his absent lover. The photograph reminds him of their former happiness together, while also enforcing the reality that "you're not coming back any more". Author Ian Inglis comments on the familiar subject matter in the conventions of pop songwriting, but identifies an atypical aspect in the lyrics' "absence of any hope that love might be rekindled". Starr expresses resignation at what the future holds, in the lines "Now you're expecting me to live without you / But that's not something that I'm looking forward to".

The song is in the key of E, with what Inglis terms an "easy melody" that allows for Starr's limitations as a singer. According to authors Roy Carr and Tony Tyler, Harrison's "distinctive composing style" is particularly evident. Starr later said of Harrison's role in their collaborations over this period: "I only know three chords and he'd stick four more in, and they'd all think I was a genius."

== Recording ==
Starr continued to pursue his film career until the end of 1972, while also participating in musical projects such as Harrison's Concert for Bangladesh. (Note: Starr and Harrison both contributed to 1972 albums by Bobby Keys, Harry Nilsson and Lon & Derrek Van Eaton. They also participated in a session for a proposed Cilla Black single in August 1972.) Late that year, Starr and Harrison recorded an early version of "Photograph" during the sessions for Harrison's Living in the Material World album. With Harrison producing, this recording took place at either Apple Studio in central London, or Harrison's home studio, FPSHOT, in Oxfordshire.

Starr re-recorded the song in March 1973, while working at Sunset Sound Recorders in Los Angeles on Ringo, his first solo album in the rock or contemporary pop style. (Note: Starr's previous solo albums, Sentimental Journey and Beaucoups of Blues, both released in 1970, had been forays focusing on pre-rock era standards and country music, respectively.) He later described Ringo as an "accidental album", since it only came about because he was attending the Grammy Awards in Nashville, where The Concert for Bangladesh won the Grammy for Best Album of 1972. Keen to find another activity to justify the flight to the US, Starr arranged to record with American producer Richard Perry during the visit.

The recording engineer on "Photograph" was Bill Schnee, and author Simon Leng writes that Harrison helped "hew" the production. Along with Starr (on drums) and Harrison (12-string acoustic guitar), the other musicians included Nicky Hopkins (piano), Klaus Voormann (bass) and Jim Keltner (drums), all of whom had participated in the sessions for Material World. In addition, Vini Poncia, Starr's new songwriting partner, and session musician Jimmy Calvert played acoustic rhythm guitar on the Los Angeles recording.

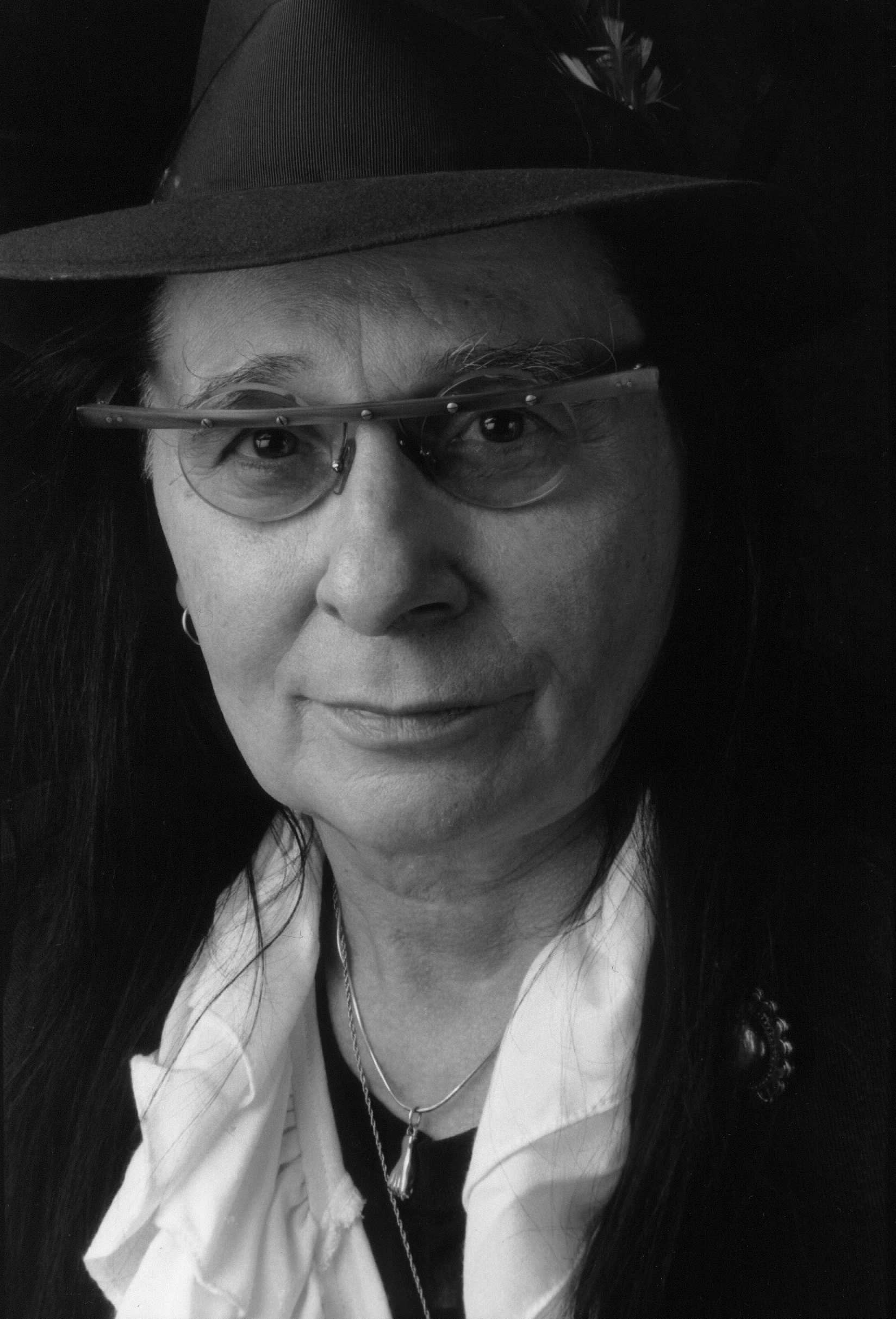
Musical arranger Jack Nitzsche helped give the recording a sound typical of Phil Spector's hit productions from the 1960s.

Overdubs on the basic tracks recorded for Ringo took place from April to July 1973. On "Photograph", the additional instrumentation included a saxophone solo by Bobby Keys and percussion played by one of Harrison's Apple Records signings, brothers Lon and Derrek Van Eaton. Harrison added harmony and backing vocals, supporting Starr's lead vocal part.

Jack Nitzsche, Phil Spector's musical arranger for much of the 1960s, provided the song's string and choral arrangements, which were overdubbed at Burbank Studios on 29 June. Aside from Nitzsche's contributions, the recording incorporates aspects of Spector's Wall of Sound production through the use of multiple rhythm guitars and drums, and prominent percussion such as castanets. Leng draws parallels between the "resonant arrangement" on "Photograph" and the production that Harrison adopted for Ravi Shankar's song "I Am Missing You", an April 1973 recording that also included Starr on drums.

=== "Down and Out" ===
With "Photograph" selected as the album's lead single, Starr chose "Down and Out", a song written by him alone, for the B-side. Starr recorded the song in England, backed by Harrison, pianist Gary Wright and Voormann. The Harrison-produced session most likely took place in 1972, according to authors Chip Madinger and Mark Easter, during the same period as Starr and Harrison's first attempt at recording "Photograph". (Note: Alternatively, the line-up of Starr, Harrison, Wright and Voormann was the same as that on "Back Off Boogaloo", recorded at Apple in September 1971.)

"Down and Out" is a twelve-bar blues with what Starr biographer Alan Clayson describes as "perfunctory" lyrics. The recording includes solos from Harrison, on slide guitar, and Wright. Perry subsequently added a horn section, resulting in him being credited as co-producer of the track. Carr and Tyler dismiss "Down and Out" with the description: "a very mundane throwaway tune only saved from extinction by the professional arrangement and by Harrison's distinctive slide-guitar solo".

== Release ==
Apple Records released the single on 24 September 1973 in America and on 19 October in Britain. (Note: The catalogue numbers were Apple 1865 and Apple R 5992 in the US and the UK, respectively.) Starr made a promotional film for "Photograph", in which he mimed to the song while walking through the grounds of Tittenhurst Park, the Berkshire estate that he had recently purchased from former bandmate John Lennon. To circumvent the BBC's ban on lip-synching, Starr placed his hand over his mouth for part of the song, making it impossible to tell whether he was singing or merely miming. (Note: The BBC aired the clip once on the music show Top of the Pops, which was the only screening it received anywhere in the world.) The single's picture sleeve consisted of a photo by Barry Feinstein that showed Starr's head poking through a large star made of silver foil. The same image, which author Bruce Spizer terms "the Ringo starfish", appeared on the single's face labels and on those of the Ringo LP.

The album's release followed in November 1973, with "Photograph" sequenced as the third track, preceding the Harrison-written "Sunshine Life for Me (Sail Away Raymond)". Opposite the printed lyrics for "Photograph" inside the album booklet, a lithograph by Voormann depicted a framed picture on a shelf or desktop, in which Starr looks dejectedly at a framed picture of a woman. In his personal life at this point, the album's release coincided with the failure of Starr's marriage, partly as a result of Harrison and Maureen conducting an affair. The friendship between the two former bandmates soon recovered, but Starr and Harrison did not officially write another song together after "Photograph".

Commenting on the context in which Starr's song of "beautiful sadness" was released in the United States, Clayson describes "Photograph" as having been a popular request on radio playlists "for a nation still awaiting the return of many of its sons from Vietnam, following the January cease-fire". Rodriguez comments on the precipitous timing of the single, as it "capitaliz[ed] on the year's nostalgia craze", while news of Starr recording with each of his former bandmates during the Ringo sessions provided further impetus. In late November, "Photograph" topped America's Billboard Hot 100 for one week. It was Starr's first number 1 hit on that chart as a solo artist and Harrison's third there as a composer since the Beatles' break-up in 1970.

"Photograph" was also number 1 in Canada and Australia, while in Britain it peaked at number 8. In Rodriguez's words, the single "did a good job of setting the table" for Ringo, which also enjoyed considerable commercial success. On 28 December 1973, "Photograph" was certified gold by the Recording Industry Association of America, signifying US sales of 1 million. It was Starr's second such award, after "It Don't Come Easy".

== Reception ==
Record Mirror predicted a "giant smash" for the single, saying that listeners would be singing along with it "for the next ten years ... at least". The reviewer praised the way the arrangement built to include "jangling piano", "booting sax", choir and strings, yet with "nothing overdone so as to take away from the song". Cash Box described the single as a "moderate paced rocker with a strong blues feel and good vocal performance". The reviewer said the song was "already one of the hottest records in the country" and predicted a top-five hit. Record World called it a "strong pop tune" with "solid Richard Perry production."

In his album review for Rolling Stone, Ben Gerson highlighted "Photograph" as one of the "three most wonderful songs" on Ringo, along with the Lennon-composed "I'm the Greatest" and the Harrison–Mal Evans collaboration "You and Me (Babe)". Gerson wrote that the song's intro provided an effective "pull on the listener" and that, while the lyrics had a sorrowful quality, "the effect is warming". Billboard's LP reviewer lauded Perry's "stunning production" on "the best Ringo album ever", adding: "We all know already that 'Photograph' has got to be a No. 1 single this month, right?"

Although less impressed with Ringo, Alan Betrock wrote in Phonograph Record: "It's also clear when you reach 'Photograph' that Side One is the undisputed champ of the album. Jack Nitzsche has thrown in a lot of his past influences here, including the Famous School of Phil Spector castanets, lesson No. 2." Betrock concluded: "'Photograph' is one of those rare pop records that grows stronger with each play, and will be covered and revived for years to come (I'll lay you 50–1 it appears on the next Andy Williams album)."

Stephen Thomas Erlewine of AllMusic views "Photograph" as a "gorgeous collaboration" between Starr and Harrison, and a track that "ranks ... among the very best post-Beatles songs by any of the Fab Four". Robert Rodriguez describes it as "an elegantly produced ballad" and Starr's "signature tune as a solo artist". Rodriguez continues: "The ersatz Wall of Sound somehow managed not to swamp the lead vocal and Harrison harmony, while embodying the best qualities of the Beatles' singles: hummable and familiar, yet fresh and enduring." In his 1977 book The Beatles Forever, Nicholas Schaffner wrote of how the song's "grand, sweeping arrangement" was reminiscent of Harrison's "own recent cosmic productions".

Author Elliot Huntley similarly recognises the extent of Harrison's influence on this and other tracks on Ringo while rueing that "Photograph" was the only formal co-composition by the two ex-Beatles. Huntley describes the song as the album's "stand-out track" and "by a country mile, the commercial high-point" for Starr as a songwriter. Former Mojo editor Mat Snow views it as "perhaps the single best song of [Starr's] career" and the "emotional heart" of the album.

== Re-releases and live versions ==
The song provided the title to Starr's 2007 career-spanning compilation Photograph: The Very Best of Ringo Starr, having earlier appeared on Blast from Your Past, a 1975 greatest-hits collection covering his years on Apple Records. For the 1991 CD reissue of Ringo, the album was expanded through the inclusion of three bonus tracks, the last of which was the long-unavailable "Down and Out". In 2009, "Photograph" was included in the Judd Apatow-directed film Funny People and appeared on the accompanying soundtrack album.

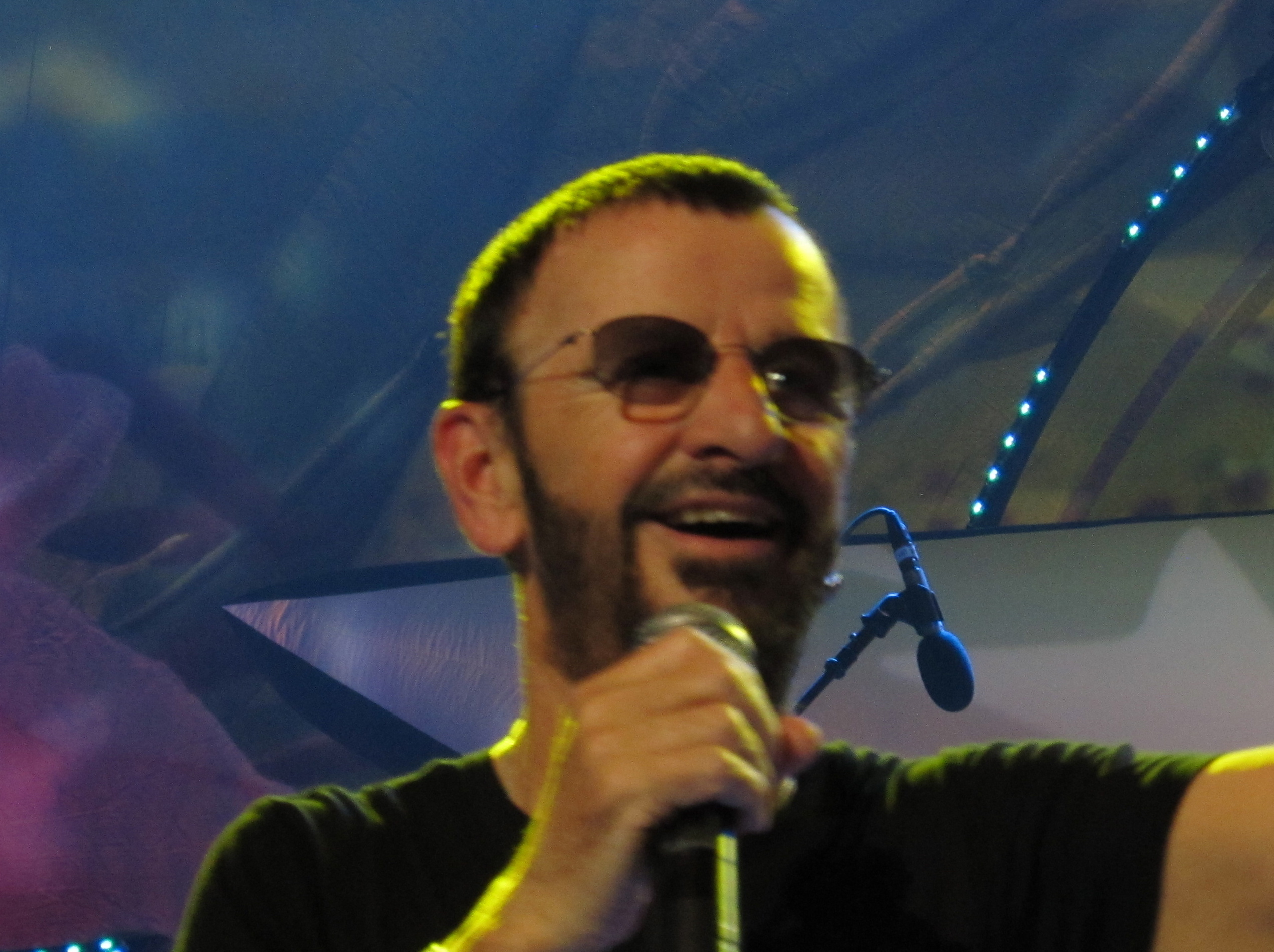
Starr performing with his All-Starr Band in 2011

Following his return to touring in July 1989 – the first tour for Starr since the Beatles quit performing live in 1966 – he has played "Photograph" regularly with the various incarnations of his All-Starr Band. Eschewing his drum kit for the role of lead singer, Starr often closed his shows with the song (before returning for an encore) during tours he made between 1989 and 2000. A live version appeared on the 1990 album and video Ringo Starr and His All-Starr Band. Recorded at the Greek Theatre in Los Angeles on 3 September 1989, it features the original All-Starr line-up of Starr, Billy Preston, Jim Keltner, Rick Danko, Levon Helm, Dr. John, Joe Walsh, Nils Lofgren and Clarence Clemons.

Starr also included the song in his performances on the television shows VH1 Storytellers, in May 1998, and PBS's Soundstage, in August 2005. With backing from the Roundheads – a band led by his latter-day producer Mark Hudson – these recordings were issued on Starr's releases VH1 Storytellers (1998) and Ringo Starr: Live at Soundstage (2007), respectively. Further versions with his All-Starr Band have appeared on the albums King Biscuit Flower Hour Presents Ringo & His New All-Starr Band (2002), Ringo Starr & His All Starr Band Live 2006 (2008) and Live at the Greek Theatre 2008 (2010), the latter with Gary Wright among the revised line-up.

Starr re-recorded the song with the American band Vandaveer for his 2017 album Give More Love.

=== Performance at the Concert for George ===
On 29 November 2002, Starr performed "Photograph" at the Concert for George, held at London's Royal Albert Hall to mark the first anniversary of Harrison's death. According to the Concert for George website: "Ringo Starr caught everyone with a tear in their eye with a rendition of 'Photograph', a composition he wrote with George, which seemed to sum up how everyone felt."

Starr's appearance came towards the end of the concert, and Inglis writes that his arrival was "given an extra poignancy by his choice of song". In his preamble to the audience, Starr stated, "I loved George, George loved me", and said that "Photograph" had taken on a new meaning with the passing of Harrison. This performance – with a large band that included Jeff Lynne, Eric Clapton, Dhani Harrison, Preston, Keltner and saxophonist Jim Horn – was issued in 2003 on the Concert for George album and appears in David Leland's documentary film of the event. In a July 2003 interview, Starr discussed his recently released tribute song to Harrison, "Never Without You", and said that he remained closest to Harrison out of all the former Beatles after the band's break-up. Colin Larkin, writing in his Encyclopedia of Popular Music, describes "Photograph" as "wonderful" and says that the "poignant" Concert for George rendition "highlighted Starr's great ability to love, and in turn, be loved".

=== Performance at the 2014 Grammy Awards ===
Starr sang "Photograph" at the 56th Annual Grammy Awards, during which he and Paul McCartney, as the two surviving ex-Beatles, were honoured with the Recording Academy's Lifetime Achievement Award. The event took place at the Staples Center in Los Angeles on 26 January 2014. Rolling Stone reported on Starr's performance of the song: "Backed by a massive full band, he bounced around the stage while old black-and-white photographs showed on a big screen behind him." The images were taken from Starr's recently published book; also titled Photograph, it consists of photos from his personal collection, dating back to the 1950s.

== Cover versions and references ==
Engelbert Humperdinck and the Ray Conniff Singers each released recordings of the song in 1974. Robert Rodriguez highlights this as unusual, in that other artists were covering a Starr song, but also ironic that Humperdinck included it on his album My Love, named after McCartney's 1973 song of the same name. The following year, London-based recording engineer David Hentschel covered "Photograph", along with all the other tracks on Ringo, for his album Sta*rtling Music. The latter, an experimental work featuring Hentschel on ARP synthesizer, was the first release on Starr's short-lived record label, Ring O' Records.

A cover version of the song by American alt rock band Camper Van Beethoven appeared on their 1993 rarities compilation Camper Vantiquities. Canadian band Sloan made mention of "Photograph" in their 1996 single "The Lines You Amend", the lyrics of which refer to a song "... about photographs / Sung by Ringo Starr / Especially in the chorus part / You always said, 'Now don't you start'."

Cilla Black eventually recorded "Photograph" for her 2003 album Beginnings: Greatest Hits & New Songs. Music critic Bruce Eder describes it as a version that "she jumps into head first at her most soulful". While Starr's original recording appeared on the soundtrack to Funny People, a cover by the film's leading actor, Adam Sandler, is available as an iTunes bonus track with the album.

== Personnel ==
According to Bruce Spizer:

- Ringo Starr – vocals, drums
- George Harrison – 12-string acoustic guitar, backing vocals
- Bobby Keys – tenor saxophone
- Nicky Hopkins – piano
- Vini Poncia – acoustic guitar, backing vocals
- Jimmy Calvert – acoustic guitar
- Klaus Voormann – bass guitar
- Jim Keltner – drums
- Lon Van Eaton – percussion
- Derrek Van Eaton – percussion
- Jack Nitzsche – orchestral and choral arrangements

== Charts ==
=== Weekly charts ===
Chart (1973–74)	Peak position
Australian Go-Set Top 40 Singles	1
Australian Kent Music Report	1
Belgian Ultratop Singles (Flanders)	8
Canadian RPM 100	1
Canadian RPM Adult Contemporary	3
Dutch MegaChart Singles	4
Irish Singles Chart	15
Japanese Oricon Singles Chart	55
New Zealand Listener Chart	4
Norwegian VG-lista Singles	6
South African Springbok Singles Chart	2
Swiss Hitparade	6
UK Singles Chart	8
US Billboard Easy Listening	3
US Billboard Hot 100	1
US Cash Box Top 100	1
West German Media Control Singles	5

=== Year-end charts ===
Chart (1973)	Rank
Canadian RPM Top Singles	25

Chart (1974)	Rank
Australia (Kent Music Report)	24
South African Springbok Singles	18
US Cash Box Top 100	61

== Certifications ==
Region	Certification	Certified units/sales
United States (RIAA)	Gold	1,000,000^{^}
^{^} Shipments figures based on certification alone.

== Sources ==
- Badman, Keith (2001). The Beatles Diary Volume 2: After the Break-Up 1970–2001. London: Omnibus Press. ISBN 978-0-7119-8307-6.
- Brown, Mick (2008). Tearing Down the Wall of Sound: The Rise and Fall of Phil Spector. New York, NY: Vintage. ISBN 978-1-4000-7661-1.
- Carr, Roy; Tyler, Tony (1978). The Beatles: An Illustrated Record. London: Trewin Copplestone Publishing. ISBN 0-450-04170-0.
- Castleman, Harry; Podrazik, Walter J. (1976). All Together Now: The First Complete Beatles Discography 1961–1975. New York, NY: Ballantine Books. ISBN 0-345-25680-8.
- Clayson, Alan (2003). Ringo Starr. London: Sanctuary. ISBN 1-86074-488-5.
- Doggett, Peter (2011). You Never Give Me Your Money: The Beatles After the Breakup. New York, NY: It Books. ISBN 978-0-06-177418-8.
- Harry, Bill (2004). The Ringo Starr Encyclopedia. London: Virgin Books. ISBN 978-0-7535-0843-5.
- Huntley, Elliot J. (2006). Mystical One: George Harrison – After the Break-up of the Beatles. Toronto, ON: Guernica Editions. ISBN 978-1-55071-197-4.
- Ingham, Chris (2006). The Rough Guide to the Beatles (2nd edn). London: Rough Guides/Penguin. ISBN 978-1-84836-525-4.
- Inglis, Ian (2010). The Words and Music of George Harrison. Santa Barbara, CA: Praeger. ISBN 978-0-313-37532-3.
- Larkin, Colin (2011). The Encyclopedia of Popular Music (5th edn). London: Omnibus Press. ISBN 978-0-85712-595-8.
- Lavezzoli, Peter (2006). The Dawn of Indian Music in the West. New York, NY: Continuum. ISBN 0-8264-2819-3.
- Leng, Simon (2006). While My Guitar Gently Weeps: The Music of George Harrison. Milwaukee, WI: Hal Leonard. ISBN 978-1-4234-0609-9.
- Madinger, Chip; Easter, Mark (2000). Eight Arms to Hold You: The Solo Beatles Compendium. Chesterfield, MO: 44.1 Productions. ISBN 0-615-11724-4.
- Rodriguez, Robert (2010). Fab Four FAQ 2.0: The Beatles' Solo Years, 1970–1980. Milwaukee, WI: Backbeat Books. ISBN 978-1-4165-9093-4.
- Rodriguez, Robert (2013). Solo in the 70s: John, Paul, George, Ringo: 1970–1980. Downers Grove, IL: Parading Press. ISBN 978-0-9892555-0-9.
- Romanowski, Patricia; George-Warren, Holly, eds. (1995). The New Rolling Stone Encyclopedia of Rock & Roll. New York, NY: Fireside/Rolling Stone Press. ISBN 0-684-81044-1.
- Schaffner, Nicholas (1978). The Beatles Forever. New York, NY: McGraw-Hill. ISBN 0-07-055087-5.
- Snow, Mat (2013). The Beatles Solo: The Illustrated Chronicles of John, Paul, George, and Ringo After The Beatles (Volume 4: Ringo). New York, NY: Race Point Publishing. ISBN 978-1-937994-26-6.
- Spizer, Bruce (2005). The Beatles Solo on Apple Records. New Orleans, LA: 498 Productions. ISBN 0-9662649-5-9.
- Williams, Richard (2003). Phil Spector: Out of His Head. London: Omnibus Press. ISBN 978-0-7119-9864-3.
- Woffinden, Bob (1981). The Beatles Apart. London: Proteus. ISBN 0-906071-89-5.
