= Ringo (album) =

Studio album by Ringo Starr
- Released: 2 November 1973
- Recorded: 5 March – 26 July 1973
- Studios: Apple and EMI (London); Sunset Sound; A&M; Burbank; Sound Lab; Producers Workshop (Los Angeles)
- Genres: Rock; pop
- Length: 37:07
- Label: Apple
- Producer: Richard Perry

Ringo Starr chronology
Beaucoups of Blues (1970)	Ringo (1973)	Goodnight Vienna (1974)

Singles from Ringo
- 1. "Photograph" Released: 24 September 1973 (US); 19 October 1973 (UK); 2. "You're Sixteen" Released: 3 December 1973 (US); 8 February 1974 (UK); 3. "Oh My My" Released: 18 February 1974 (US only)

Ringo is the third studio album by English musician Ringo Starr, released on 2 November 1973 on Apple Records. The album is noted for the participation of all four former Beatles and for its numerous guest stars, something that would become a signature for Starr on many of his subsequent albums and tours.

Ringo peaked at number seven on the UK Albums Chart, number two on the US Billboard 200, and topped the Canada RPM national albums chart. It has been certified platinum by the Recording Industry Association of America (RIAA).

== Background ==
Starr released the standards tribute Sentimental Journey and the country-and-western Beaucoups of Blues in 1970. He issued the singles "It Don't Come Easy" and "Back Off Boogaloo" in 1971 and 1972; both were produced by and co-written with his former Beatles bandmate George Harrison. Both of these singles were big successes and would ordinarily have inspired albums to support them, but Starr declined to follow through, preferring to concentrate on acting during this period. In early 1973, Starr decided that the time was right to begin his first rock solo album. He had already employed Richard Perry to arrange one of the tracks on Sentimental Journey, so he asked him to produce the sessions.

== Recording ==
Recording started on 5 March 1973 upon Starr's arrival in Los Angeles at Sunset Sound Recorders. Sessions were produced by Richard Perry. Starr sent word to his musician friends to help him in his new venture and they all responded positively. Taking part in the sessions were Marc Bolan, four members of The Band (except Richard Manuel), Billy Preston, Klaus Voormann, Nicky Hopkins, Harry Nilsson, Jim Keltner and James Booker. Additionally, Lennon, McCartney and Harrison all appeared on and composed material for Ringo.

"Photograph" had been written on 15 May 1971 while on a sailing holiday with his wife Maureen, Harrison, Harrison's wife Pattie Boyd, and Cilla Black. Starr and Harrison wrote the song with input from the others. The song was first recorded in late 1972 with Harrison as producer, during the sessions for Harrison's Living in the Material World album. The song was remade five months later, produced by Perry for its appearance on Ringo. Harrison and Mal Evans were sharing a living space in Los Angeles when they wrote "You and Me (Babe)" after Evans asked Harrison to add music to a song which he was working on.

Just like that; no planning. The three ex-Beatles recorded one of John's songs. Everyone in the room was just gleaming… it's such a universal gleam with The Beatles.

— Richard Perry, recalling the session for "I'm the Greatest"

Harrison dropped by on the sessions on 10 March to see what kind of material Starr had recorded up to that point, saying that he was "knocked out by what you've done". He returned on 12 March and laid down backing vocals. Starr, John Lennon, and Harrison appear together on Lennon's "I'm the Greatest", which was recorded on 13 March. (Note: Lennon previously recorded a demo of the song on 28 December 1970, after watching a repeat of the Beatles' A Hard Day's Night, with the intent of recording the track himself.) Ten takes of the song were recorded in a session lasting approximately 18 minutes. Both Lennon and Harrison were in Los Angeles for business matters with Capitol Records. Lennon returned to New York on 14 March.

British music magazine Melody Maker reported on 17 March that the session was a Beatles reunion. "Rumours flashed through Los Angeles this week that three of the Beatles have teamed up for recording purposes. John Lennon, George Harrison and Ringo Starr are all in Los Angeles with Klaus Voormann, the bassist rumoured to replace Paul McCartney after his departure from the group." Also recorded during this month was Randy Newman's "Have You Seen My Baby?"; (Note: The track is sometimes titled as "Hold On".) it features overdubbed guitar by Bolan which was added at A&M Studios. This group of sessions lasted until 27 March. The next day, Starr and Perry flew to England. More work on the tracks was done at Burbank Studios, The Sound Lab, and Producers' Workshop. On 16 April, Starr went to Apple Studio in London to record "Six O'Clock" with Paul McCartney and his wife Linda, as drug arrests kept McCartney from entering the US. McCartney played synthesizer and piano and sang backing vocals on the track.

After finishing "Six O'Clock", Starr asked his chauffeur to buy some tap dancing shoes which Starr would use on "Step Lightly". He then recorded "You're Sixteen" and "Step Lightly" with Nilsson; McCartney also appears imitating a kazoo on "You're Sixteen". This second block of recording sessions lasted until 30 April, and overdubs were added at Sunset Sound Recorders throughout July. The album was mixed at Sunset Sound on 24 July.

== Release ==
According to a report in Billboard magazine in late September 1973, Ringo's release was delayed while work was being completed on the album artwork. Apple/Capitol Records released Ringo on 2 November in the US, (Note: US Apple SWAL-3413) and on 9 November by Apple/EMI in the UK. (Note: UK Apple PCTC 252)

The original cassette tape and 8-track versions of the album, as well as a small number of early promotional copies of the vinyl album, contained a longer version of "Six O'Clock". All of the stock copies of vinyl version of the LP, including both the original pressing and the 1981 LP re-release of the album, as well as reissues in various other formats over time, contained the shorter version of the song. The record label on the original stock pressing of the vinyl album incorrectly lists the running time of "Six O'Clock" as 5:26, which may have led some to mistakenly assume that the original pressing contained the long version of the song. The label on the reissued vinyl album correctly lists the running time as 4:06. At the time of release, various reviews and press articles of the day stated that the longer version was "snuck" onto the tape duplicating masters at the last moment; this may have been done for the benefit of 8-track versions of the album, to make program two of the tape (on which the song appeared) the same approximate length as the other tracks. Artwork for a quadrophonic version was produced, but was never released. Additionally, the original artwork lists the second song, written by Randy Newman, as "Hold On" which was later corrected to "Have You Seen My Baby" in following pressings.

When Ringo was reissued on compact disc, the album included three bonus tracks: Starr's 1971 hit single "It Don't Come Easy" and its B-side "Early 1970", as well as the B-side to "Photograph", "Down and Out". The CD was released in the UK on 4 March 1991, (Note: UK Parlophone CDP 7 95884 2) and in the US by Capitol on 6 May. (Note: US Capitol CDP 795637) On some CD reissues "Down And Out" is inserted into the album as the fourth track (between "Photograph" and "Sunshine Life For Me (Sail Away Raymond)"). On the US CD, "You and Me (Babe)" begins crossfaded over the end of "Devil Woman," even though the original album, and the UK CD, had these songs separated by silence. Strangely, the longer version of "Six O'Clock" was not added as a bonus track to the reissue of this album, but instead appeared on the reissue of Goodnight Vienna.

=== Singles ===
On 24 September, "Photograph" was released as the album's lead single in the US, backed by "Down and Out". Starr filmed a promo clip for the song at his Tittenhurst Park residence, although the film's only screening was on a single episode of BBC TV's Top of the Pops, which has since been lost. The single was issued a month later in the UK, on 19 October.

"You're Sixteen" was released as the album's second single, backed with "Devil Woman", in the US on 3 December. In late December, on the 28th, "Photograph" went gold in the US. "You're Sixteen" acquired gold status in the US on 31 January 1974, and was released in the UK on 8 February, reaching No. 4. In the US, the singles from Ringo "Photograph" and Starr's cover of "You're Sixteen" both went to No. 1. On 18 February, "Oh My My" was released as a single only in the US, backed with "Step Lightly". (Note: US Apple 1872) After the singles became hits, Lennon sent Starr a telegram: "Congratulations. How dare you? And please write me a hit song."

== Reception ==
Professional ratings
Review scores
Source	Rating
AllMusic	4.5/5 stars
Christgau's Record Guide	B−
Encyclopedia of Popular Music	3/5 stars
The Essential Rock Discography	7/10
MusicHound	3.5/5
Music Story	4.5/5 stars
Q	4/5 stars
Record Collector	3/5 stars
The Rolling Stone Album Guide	3/5 stars

Propelled by the international success of "Photograph", and speculation regarding the former Beatles working together on the same project, the album reached No. 1 in Canada, No. 7 in the UK, and No. 2 on the US Billboard 200 chart, denied the top position by Elton John's Goodbye Yellow Brick Road. Ringo peaked at No. 1 on America's other albums charts, however, in Cashbox and Record World. The album was certified gold in America on 8 November and in Britain a month after its release there.

Ringo was critically well received. Loraine Alterman of The New York Times described it as an "instant knockout ... [a] sensational album". In his review for Rolling Stone, Ben Gerson said that, on one hand, Starr's limited artistry and the abundance of star guests made the album "rambling and inconsistent", yet in terms of "atmosphere", "Ringo is the most successful record by an ex-Beatle. It is not polemical and abrasive like Lennon's, harsh and self-pitying like Harrison's, or precious and flimsy like McCartney's, but balanced, airy and amiable."

== Track listing ==
Side one
No.	Title	Writer(s)	Length
1.	"I'm the Greatest"	John Lennon	3:23
2.	"Have You Seen My Baby?"	Randy Newman	3:43
3.	"Photograph"	Richard Starkey; George Harrison	3:58
4.	"Sunshine Life for Me (Sail Away Raymond)"	George Harrison	2:44
5.	"You're Sixteen"	Bob Sherman; Dick Sherman	2:50

Side two
No.	Title	Writer(s)	Length
1.	"Oh My My"	Starkey; Vini Poncia	4:17
2.	"Step Lightly"	Starkey	3:15
3.	"Six O'Clock"	Paul McCartney; Linda McCartney	4:06
4.	"Devil Woman"	Starkey; Poncia	4:01
5.	"You and Me (Babe)"	Harrison; Mal Evans	4:58

CD bonus tracks
No.	Title	Writer(s)	Length
11.	"It Don't Come Easy"	Starkey	3:02
12.	"Early 1970"	Starkey	2:20
13.	"Down and Out"	Starkey	3:04

Notes:

- "Have You Seen My Baby" is listed as "Hold On" on the record label.
- Cassette pressings contain an extended version of "Six O'Clock" running 5:26. While the LP contains a shortened version running 4:05, the center label incorrectly lists the duration as 5:26.
- Digital releases, as well as some CD pressings, place "Down and Out" as the fourth track, in between "Photograph" and "Sunshine Life for Me (Sail Away Raymond)".

== Personnel ==
Track numbering refers to CD and digital releases of the album.

- Ringo Starr – lead vocals, drums; percussion (track 4)
- George Harrison – electric guitar (tracks 1, 4, 10), acoustic guitar (track 3), backing vocals (tracks 3, 4)
- Vini Poncia – acoustic guitar (tracks 3, 10), electric guitar (track 5), backing vocals (tracks 4, 6), percussion (track 8)
- Jimmy Calvert – acoustic guitar (tracks 3, 7), electric guitar (tracks 5, 6, 9)
- Robbie Robertson – electric guitar (track 4)
- Steve Cropper – electric guitar (track 7)
- Marc Bolan – guitars (track 2)
- Klaus Voormann – bass guitar (all tracks)
- Paul McCartney – backing vocals (tracks 5, 8); "kazoo" vocal solo (track 5); piano, synthesizer, flute and string arrangements (track 8)
- Linda McCartney – backing vocals (track 8)
- John Lennon – piano, backing vocals (track 1)
- Billy Preston – organ (tracks 1, 6), piano (track 6)
- Garth Hudson – accordion (track 4)
- Levon Helm – mandolin (track 4)
- Rick Danko – fiddle (track 4)
- James Booker – piano (track 2)
- Nicky Hopkins – piano (tracks 3, 5, 10)
- Tom Hensley – piano (track 9)
- Gary Wright - piano (track 13)
- Jim Keltner – drums (tracks 2, 3, 5, 6, 9)
- Milt Holland – percussion (tracks 2, 9), marimba (track 10)
- Lon & Derrek Van Eaton – percussion (track 3)
- Tom Scott – horns & arrangements (tracks 2, 6, 7, 9, 10)
- Chuck Findley – horns (track 9)
- Bobby Keys – saxophone (track 3)
- David Bromberg – banjo, fiddle (track 4)
- Harry Nilsson – backing vocals (track 5)
- Martha Reeves – backing vocals (track 6)
- Merry Clayton – backing vocals (track 6)
- Richard Perry – backing vocals (track 9)

== Charts ==
=== Weekly charts ===
Chart (1973–74)	Peak position
Australian Albums (Kent Music Report)	2
Canada Top Albums/CDs (RPM)	1
Dutch Albums (Album Top 100)	7
Finnish Albums (The Official Finnish Charts)	21
German Albums (Offizielle Top 100)	28
Italian Albums (Musica e Dischi)	2
Japanese Albums (Oricon)	10
Norwegian Albums (VG-lista)	5
Spanish Albums (AFYVE)	1
Swedish Albums (Sverigetopplistan)	1
UK Albums (Official Charts)	7
US Billboard 200	2

=== Year-end charts ===
Chart (1973)	Peak position
Dutch Albums (Album Top 100)	39

Chart (1974)	Peak position
Australian Albums (Kent Music Report)	15
Canada Top Albums/CDs (RPM)	77
US Billboard 200	30

== Certifications ==
Region	Certification	Certified units/sales
United Kingdom (BPI)	Gold	100,000^{^}
United States (RIAA)	Platinum	1,000,000^{^}
^{^} Shipments figures based on certification alone.

== Cover version ==
An instrumental version of the album was produced by David Hentschel and titled Sta*rtling Music. Sta*rtling Music was the first release on Starr's label, Ring O' Records; released on 18 April 1975 in the UK, (Note: UK Ringo O' 2320-101) and four years later on 17 February 1979 in the US. (Note: US Ringo O' ST 11372) Just prior to the album was a single, "Oh My My", backed with "Devil Woman", released on 17 February 1975 in the US, (Note: US Ringo O' 4030) and on 21 March in the UK. (Note: UK Ringo O' 2017-101) The album, was re-released in the US on Capitol in October 1980. (Note: US Capitol SN-16114) A budget edition was released in the UK on 27 November by Music for Pleasure. (Note: UK Music for Pleasure MFP 50508)
