= 6AM =

6 a.m. is a time on the 12-hour clock.

6AM or variants may also refer to:

- "6 AM", a 2013 song by Colombian singer J Balvin
- "6am", a 2013 song in the album More Than Just a Dream by Fitz and The Tantrums
- 6-Acetylmorphine (6-AM)

== See also ==
- "Six O'Clock", a song by Ringo Starr
- "6 in the Mornin'", a song by Ice-T
