= Photograph (book) =

Photography book by Ringo Starr

- First edition
- Author: Ringo Starr
- Language: English
- Genre: Photography, non-fiction
- Published: 2013
- Publisher: Genesis Publications
- Pages: 304

Photograph is a photography book by Ringo Starr. The book is a collection of 240 photographs of Starr's that also serves as an autobiography through the photo captions. The title of the book is also the title of his 1973 single "Photograph". The book was first published in 2013 in a deluxe 2,500-copy limited edition by Genesis Publications, and later in a mass edition in 2015.

== Background ==
The book contains photographs of Starr and his family while growing up, and photographs he took himself during his time with the Beatles. According to Starr, he did not want to write an autobiography but wanted instead to do it in the form of photographs. He said: "Pictures are great because they remind you of so much. If one of these pictures is, let's say, September of 1964, if you were just to ask me 'What did you do then?' No idea! But oh, there's the shot, and all those memories kick in." Starr thought he had lost the photographs he took, but found them, including two boxes of negatives, in storage in a basement while looking for material for a Grammy Museum exhibit. Some of these photographs were displayed at the National Portrait Gallery in London, which started on 9 September 2015 to coincide with the release of the mass edition. This edition, as well as a limited edition of sets of photographic prints, were initially released for sale at the gallery, but later became available in book shops on 21 September 2015.
