= Oh My My (Ringo Starr song) =

- Netherlands picture sleeve

Single by Ringo Starr

from the album Ringo
- B-side: "Step Lightly" (US); "No No Song" (UK)
- Released: 18 February 1974 (US); 9 January 1976 (UK)
- Genre: Rock
- Length: 3:38
- Label: Apple
- Songwriters: Richard Starkey, Vini Poncia
- Producer: Richard Perry

Ringo Starr singles chronology
"You're Sixteen" (1974)	"Oh My My" (1974)	"Only You (And You Alone)" (1974)

"Oh My My" is a song by English musician Ringo Starr from his 1973 album Ringo. It was also issued as the third single from the album, becoming a top-five hit in the United States and Canada. The recording was produced by Richard Perry and includes backing vocals by Merry Clayton and Martha Reeves.

== Background ==
"Oh My My" was co-written by Starr (credited by his real name, "Richard Starkey") and Vini Poncia, a recurrent collaborator of Starr's during the 1970s. Billy Preston plays keyboards on the track. Both Starr and Jim Keltner play drums, while Klaus Voormann plays bass. Tom Scott plays the saxophone solo.

== Personnel ==
- Ringo Starr - lead vocals, drums
- Klaus Voormann - bass
- Tom Scott - saxophone
- Jimmy Calvert - electric guitar
- Billy Preston - piano, organ
- Jim Keltner - drums
- Vini Poncia - backing vocals
- Martha Reeves – backing vocals
- Merry Clayton – backing vocals

== Release ==
The song was first released as the opening track on side two of the Ringo LP, in November 1973. Issued as a single on 18 February 1974 in the US, (Note: US Apple 1872) Billboard felt that the instrumental portion of the song was more effective than the lyrics. Cash Box said that the "Richard Perry production adds the 'hit' touch to this amusing little ditty." Record World said that "the superb Perry production is the super-solid stuff from which gold records are made."

"Oh My My" peaked at number 5 on the Billboard Hot 100, number 3 in Canada and number 24 on the Billboard Adult Contemporary chart, making it one of the most successful songs of Starr's career. The song was released on a UK single on 9 January 1976, (Note: UK Apple R 6011) backed with "No No Song", to promote Starr's Blast from Your Past compilation album.

Starr first performed "Oh My My" in 2008 with the tenth incarnation of his All-Starr Band.

== Chart performance ==
=== Weekly singles charts ===
Chart (1974)	Peak position
Canada	3
New Zealand (Listener)	17
US Billboard Easy Listening	24
US Billboard Hot 100	5

=== Year-end charts ===
Chart (1974)	Rank
US Billboard Singles	74

== Cover versions ==
- The song was covered by Ike & Tina Turner, who performed it on a 1975 episode of Soul Train and on Don Kirshner's Rock Concert in 1976.
- Bette Midler performed a cover of the track on her live album Live at Last.
- David Hentschel released an instrumental version on Starr's Ring O' Records label, in 1975.
- Maggie Bell recorded the song in 1974.
- Irish band Gina, Dale Haze and the Champions released the song as a single in 1975, reaching the Irish top 30.
- Kirka, a Finnish band, released the song with Finnish lyrics.
