= Producers' Workshop =

- Genre: Anthology
- Country of origin: Canada
- Original language: English
- No. of seasons: 1

Production
- Running time: 30 minutes

Original release
- Network: CBC Television
- Release: 8 July – 2 September 1955

Producers' Workshop is a Canadian drama and documentary television series that aired on CBC Television in 1955.

== Premise ==
This series presented a variety of fiction and non-fiction works. Documentaries included subjects such as the Rebellions of 1837 and bees. In another episode, CBC Radio's Of All Things was given a television adaptation with host Austin Willis. Plays seen on Producers' Workshop included Big Boys Shouldn't Cry (Ted Allan), Flesh Of My Flesh (Guy Parent producer; Mac Shoub writer), The Strike (George Salverson) and The Vise (Luigi Pirandello writer).

== Scheduling ==
This half-hour series was broadcast Fridays at 10:30 p.m. (Eastern) from 8 July to 2 September 1955.
