= NME Originals =

The NME Originals is a collection of articles and reviews from the NME and Melody Maker magazines about one band or genre. The first issue was about the Beatles, published on 3 April 2002. Many issues in the series were produced by NME editorial director Steve Sutherland, but some of the later titles, such as those on the former Beatles' solo years and Mod, were under the editorship of Chris Hunt.

- The Beatles – (April 2002)
- Punk – (April 2002)
- Oasis – (June 2002)
- Manic Street Preachers – (October 2002)
- U2 – (November 2002)
- Nirvana – (February 2003)
- Madchester – (April 2003)
- Radiohead – (June 2003)
- Bob Dylan – (August 2003) – an Uncut Legends edition
- The Rolling Stones – (August 2003)
- John Lennon – (October 2003)
- 1960s – (December 2003)
- The Who – (February 2004) – in conjunction with Uncut
- Kurt Cobain – (March 2004) – an Uncut Legends edition
- The Clash – (April 2004) – in conjunction with Uncut
- Glam – (July 2004)
- Gods of Rock – (September 2004)
- Goth – (October 2004)
- Bruce Springsteen – (December 2004)
- 80s – (January 2005)
- Mod – (April 2005)
- The Solo Years of The Beatles – (June 2005)
- Elvis – (April 2005)
- Britpop – (Volume 2, Issue 4 2005)
