= You're Sixteen =

1960 song by Johnny Burnette, also covered by Ringo Starr

Single by Johnny Burnette

from the album Johnny Burnette
- B-side: "I Beg Your Pardon"
- Released: October 1960
- Recorded: September 1960
- Studio: United Recorders, Hollywood, California
- Genre: Rock and roll
- Length: 1:56
- Label: Liberty (US); London (UK)
- Songwriters: Robert B. Sherman; Richard M. Sherman
- Producer: Snuff Garrett

Johnny Burnette singles chronology
"Dreamin'" (1960)	"You're Sixteen" (1960)	"Little Boy Sad" (1961)

"You're Sixteen" is a song written by the Sherman Brothers (Robert B. Sherman and Richard M. Sherman). It was first performed by American rockabilly singer Johnny Burnette, whose version peaked at number eight on the US Billboard Hot 100 in December 1960 and number 3 in the UK in 1961. The song was covered by Ringo Starr in 1973 and this version reached number one in the US.

== In popular culture ==
The version by Burnette was included on the soundtrack to the 1973 film American Graffiti, directed by George Lucas.

== Charts ==
=== Weekly charts ===
Chart (1960–1961)	Peak position
UK Record Retailer Chart	3
US Billboard Hot 100	8
US Cash Box Top 100	7

=== Year-end charts ===
Chart (1961)	Rank
UK Record Retailer	48
US Cash Box Top 100	45

== Personnel ==
The personnel on the Johnny Burnette version included:

- Johnny Burnette – vocal
- Bobby Gibbons – guitar
- Vincent Terri – guitar
- Red Callender – bass
- Ernie Freeman – piano
- Jerry Allison – drums
- Alvin Dinkin – viola
- Stanley Harris – viola
- Dave Berman – violin
- Herman Clebanoff – violin
- Harold Dicterow – violin
- Ben "Benny" Gill – violin
- Irma Neumann – violin
- Joe Stepansky – violin
- Darrel Terwilliger – violin
- Gerald Vinci – violin
- Bill Tobin – backing vocals

== Ringo Starr version ==
"You're Sixteen"
- UK picture sleeve

Single by Ringo Starr

from the album Ringo
- B-side: "Devil Woman"
- Released: December 3, 1973 (US); February 8, 1974 (UK)
- Recorded: September 1973
- Studio: Sunset Sound, Los Angeles
- Genre: Rock and roll
- Length: 2:46
- Label: Apple
- Songwriters: Robert B. Sherman, Richard M. Sherman
- Producer: Richard Perry

Ringo Starr singles chronology
"Photograph" (1973)	"You're Sixteen" (1973)	"Oh My My" (1974)

Ringo Starr's version was released as a single in the United States (Note: US Apple 1870) on December 3, 1973, and in the UK (Note: UK Apple R 5995) on February 8, 1974.

In January 1974, the song, taken from the album Ringo, hit number one on the Billboard Hot 100. The performance reunited Ringo Starr with his former Beatles bandmate Paul McCartney. Although McCartney is credited on the liner notes of the album Ringo as having played the solo on a kazoo, reviewer Michael Verity has quoted the song's producer Richard Perry as revealing that it was not actually a kazoo: "In fact, the solo on 'You're Sixteen,' which sounds like a kazoo or something, was Paul singing very spontaneously as we played that track back, so he’s singing the solo on that." Starr's version remains one of the few No. 1 singles to feature a 'kazoo-sound' solo. Harry Nilsson sang backing vocals on Starr's version; Nicky Hopkins is heard playing the piano, including going up and down the scale in the instrumental fade of the song. In Ringo's version, the melody and the chords were different in the bridge section, which led to a minor key, while the original version used only major keys. The ending featured Starr singing the chorus from Clarence "Frogman" Henry's hit song "(I Don't Know Why) But I Do" before breaking into a chorus of "What Shall We Do With the Drunken Sailor?" at the fade.

Its 1978 music video, an excerpt of Starr's TV movie Ringo, features Carrie Fisher as Starr's love interest.

=== Personnel ===
The personnel on the Ringo Starr version included:

- Ringo Starr – vocal, drums
- Paul McCartney – "kazoo" vocal solo, backing vocals
- Harry Nilsson – backing vocals
- Klaus Voormann – bass guitar
- Jim Keltner – drums
- Nicky Hopkins – piano
- Vini Poncia – guitar
- Jimmy Calvert – guitar

=== Critical reception ===
Upon release, a reviewer for Cash Box called Ringo's version "fantastic and perfect for the '70's," going on to say that "not only is the vocal perfect, and steady, for this delightful easy going rocker, but the music is the perfect complement." Record World said that the "background vocals by Nilsson add just the right spice."

=== Controversy ===
Some retrospective commentary on "You're Sixteen" has condemned it for sexualizing a teenager. In 2019, Tom Breihan of Stereogum reviewed the song negatively, writing that, as it relates to musicians courting or having sex with teenagers, "Ringo Starr wasn't the worst offender of his era, and there's plenty of plausible deniability built into 'You're Sixteen.' But it's still a gross song. And even if it wasn't gross, it's not like it has any real musical merit. Maybe people thought this shit was cute then, but it's not cute now, and I won't be sad if I never hear 'You're Sixteen' again." In 2021, Troy L. Smith of Cleveland.com wrote "In his defense, Ringo Starr did not write 'You're Sixteen.' His hit is a cover of a Johnny Burnette song written by the Sherman Brothers. Of course, that doesn’t excuse Starr's judgment as a 33-year-old man releasing a song about a love for a 16-year-old girl."

== Charts ==
=== Weekly charts ===
Chart (1973–1974)	Peak position
Australia (Kent Music Report)	6
Belgium	10
Canada RPM Top Singles	2
Canada RPM Adult Contemporary	13
Ireland (IRMA)	2
Germany	19
Japan (Oricon)	74
Netherlands	6
New Zealand (Listener)	1
Norway	6
South Africa (Springbok)	3
Switzerland	6
UK Singles Chart	4
US Billboard Hot 100	1
US Billboard Easy Listening	2
US Cash Box Top 100	1

=== Year-end charts ===
Chart (1974)	Rank
Australia (Kent Music Report)	62
Canada	32
UK	28
US Billboard Hot 100	31
US Cash Box Top 100	18
