= Ring O' Records =

British record label

- Founded: May 1974
- Founder: Ringo Starr
- Defunct: 1978
- Distributors: Polydor, Capitol, Mercury
- Genre: Rock
- Country of origin: United Kingdom

Ring O' Records was a record label founded by former Beatle Ringo Starr in 1974. The label's formation coincided with the winding down of the Beatles' Apple Records and allowed Starr to continue supporting other artists' projects while maintaining his solo career. The label was shut down in 1978, having failed to achieve commercial success with a roster of artists that included David Hentschel, Bobby Keys, Graham Bonnet and Rab Noakes. Starr himself never recorded for Ring O' Records, although, following the expiration of his contract with Apple in January 1976, he signed with Polydor, which distributed his label throughout Europe. From 1977, Ring O' was distributed in some territories by Mercury Records.

== History ==
Ringo Starr decided to form his own record label, as George Harrison had done with Dark Horse in 1974, after the two former bandmates had considered buying the Beatles' company, Apple Records, and running it together. The name "Ring O' Records" was suggested by John Lennon. In September 1973, Starr had bought Lennon's Berkshire estate, Tittenhurst Park, which included a recording studio that Starr renamed Starling Studios and began hiring out to other artists. The label's logo was a chrome-plated telephone, which was one of the eccentric designs marketed by Starr and Robin Cruikshank's furniture company, Ringo Or Robin Limited. Distribution for Ring O' Records was at first shared between Polydor and, in the United States and Canada, Capitol Records. This arrangement was announced in Billboard magazine in December 1974, along with a report predicting the imminent resolution of differences relating to the formal dissolution of the Beatles' business partnership.

Issued in February 1975, the label's inaugural releases were keyboard player David Hentschel's album Sta*rtling Music and its lead single, "Oh My My". The album was an instrumental interpretation of Starr's 1973 LP Ringo, performed by Hentschel on ARP synthesizer. In early April 1975, Starr promoted Ring O' with a series of print and radio interviews in London. Echoing the Beatles' intentions for Apple, Starr said he founded the company so that artists "won't have to beg". He also said: "I'd like it to be like United Artists. My aim in the end is to get all the independents together, so that we all can run our own business. As it is, we're all being run by people whose only qualification is as an accountant." Unlike Harrison with Dark Horse, Starr had limited involvement with the label, which was run by Barry Anthony.

Ring O' signed saxophonist Bobby Keys on a long-term contract. His debut release for the label was the single "Gimmie the Key" in August 1975. Starr had hoped to sign his friend Harry Nilsson also, but Nilsson chose to renew his contract with RCA Records. The next two Ring O' releases were singles by Australian singer-songwriter Carl Groszmann, "I've Had It", and "Colonel" Doug Bogie, with his reggae arrangement of "Away in a Manger". As with subsequent Ring O' Records artists such as Graham Bonnet, Stormer, Johnny Warman and Suzanne, none of these acts achieved success on the label.

The company signed eleven artists and released fifteen singles and five albums between 1975 and 1978. With Starr's own career in decline by the late 1970s, he and Anthony were disheartened by what they saw as Polydor's failure to support the label. As early as 1976, a Polydor executive had commented that Starr was treating his label "like a toy". After Starr's contract with Polydor expired in August 1978, Ring O' continued under the guise of Able Label Productions until its closure in December. Among its final releases were Rab Noakes' single "Restless", and a novelty single by Dirk & Stig (of the Rutles), "Ging Gang Goolie". Writing in 1981, former NME journalist Bob Woffinden said of Ring O' Records: "The name was perfect, but little else about the set-up was right … One can naturally appreciate the altruistic desire to assist struggling artists, but there are less risky ways of doing it."

== Sources ==
- Badman, Keith (2001). The Beatles Diary Volume 2: After the Break-Up 1970–2001. London: Omnibus Press. ISBN 978-0-7119-8307-6.
- Castleman, Harry; Podrazik, Walter J. (1976). All Together Now: The First Complete Beatles Discography 1961–1975. New York, NY: Ballantine Books. ISBN 0-345-25680-8.
- Clayson, Alan (2003). Ringo Starr. London: Sanctuary. ISBN 1-86074-488-5.
- Doggett, Peter (2011). You Never Give Me Your Money: The Beatles After the Breakup. New York, NY: It Books. ISBN 978-0-06-177418-8.
- Harry, Bill (2004). The Ringo Starr Encyclopedia. London: Virgin Books. ISBN 978-0-7535-0843-5.
- Madinger, Chip; Easter, Mark (2000). Eight Arms to Hold You: The Solo Beatles Compendium. Chesterfield, MO: 44.1 Productions. ISBN 0-615-11724-4.
- Rodriguez, Robert (2010). Fab Four FAQ 2.0: The Beatles' Solo Years, 1970–1980. Milwaukee, WI: Backbeat Books. ISBN 978-1-4165-9093-4.
- Schaffner, Nicholas (1978). The Beatles Forever. New York, NY: McGraw-Hill. ISBN 0-07-055087-5.
- Woffinden, Bob (1981). The Beatles Apart. London: Proteus. ISBN 0-906071-89-5.
