= Phonograph Record (magazine) =

American monthly rock music magazine

- Categories: Music magazine
- Frequency: Monthly
- First issue: September 1970
- Final issue: May 1978
- Country: United States
- Based in: Los Angeles, California
- Language: English
- OCLC: 31304908

Phonograph Record was an American monthly rock music magazine that operated between 1970 and 1978. It was founded in September 1970 in Los Angeles, California, by Marty Cerf, as a rival to Creem and Rolling Stone, and funded by United Artists. In addition to being a newsstand title, the magazine was available through radio stations throughout the United States and distributed free to music retailers. It was often referred to as PRM, due to the inclusion of the word "magazine" in the masthead.

Aside from Cerf, Greg Shaw and Ken Barnes variously served as editor of Phonograph Record before its final issue in May 1978. It also featured reviews and other contributions from noted music journalists such as Lester Bangs, Jon Tiven, John Mendelsohn, Mitchell Cohen, Metal Mike Saunders, Bud Scoppa, Richard Cromelin, Mark Leviton, Colman Andrews, and Jonh Ingham.
