= Sentimental Journey (Ringo Starr album) =

Studio album by Ringo Starr
- Released: 27 March 1970
- Recorded: 27 October 1969 – 6 March 1970
- Studios: EMI, Olympic, Wessex Sound, De Lane Lea, Trident and Morgan, London; A&M, Los Angeles
- Genres: Traditional pop; jazz
- Length: 34:03
- Label: Apple
- Producer: George Martin

Ringo Starr chronology
Sentimental Journey (1970)	Beaucoups of Blues (1970)

Sentimental Journey is the debut solo studio album by the English musician Ringo Starr. It was released by Apple Records in March 1970 as the Beatles were breaking up. The album is a collection of pre-rock 'n' roll standards that Starr recalled from his childhood in Liverpool. As a departure from the experimental quality that had characterised solo LPs by George Harrison and John Lennon since 1968, it was the first studio album by an individual Beatle to embrace a popular music form.

Starr began recording Sentimental Journey in London in October 1969, in response to Lennon's private announcement that he was leaving the Beatles. He recruited George Martin to produce the sessions and used different musical arrangers for each song. Starr made a promotional film for the song "Sentimental Journey", in which he performed with an orchestra and dancers at the Talk of the Town nightclub. The cover of the album shows Starr in front of a pub in the Dingle area of Liverpool, where he grew up.

The album's impact was compromised by Paul McCartney's refusal to delay the release of his solo debut, McCartney, and by McCartney then initiating the group's break-up. Despite receiving mixed reviews from music critics and confusing Beatles fans through its choice of music, Sentimental Journey charted inside the top ten in the United Kingdom and peaked at number 22 on the Billboard Top LPs chart in the United States. The album was a forerunner to standards collections by artists such as Harry Nilsson and Linda Ronstadt, and to the vogue from the late 1990s onwards for rock artists such as Bryan Ferry, Rod Stewart and Boz Scaggs to embrace big band music.

== Background ==
I was lost for a while. That's well-documented ... And I just thought of all those songs that I was brought up with, all the parties we'd had in Liverpool at our house and all the neighbours' houses ... So I called George Martin and said, "Why don't we take a sentimental journey?"

— Ringo Starr, 2001

Despite his limited songwriting experience, Ringo Starr was encouraged to make a solo album by his Beatles bandmates. His mother Elsie Starkey and stepfather Harry Graves also supported the idea when Starr visited them at their Liverpool home. His mother said that Starr had a good singing voice. He first considered making a country music album, but then decided to record a collection of old standards that would reflect his mother's favourite songs. The tapes from the Beatles' January 1969 Get Back film project captured Starr expressing a wish to make an album of standards.

Starr committed to the project in order to keep active following John Lennon's unpublicised decision in September 1969 to leave the Beatles, signalling that the group were effectively no more. Starr described his mindset at the time: "I sat in the garden for a while wondering what the hell to do with my life ... It was quite a dramatic period for me – or traumatic, actually." He asked Beatles producer George Martin to produce the album. (Note: Music critic Tim Riley views "Good Night", a Lennon composition that Starr sang as the closing track of the Beatles' self-titled 1968 double album, as the forerunner to Sentimental Journey. At Lennon's request, Martin gave the song a lush orchestral arrangement in the style of an Old Hollywood film soundtrack.) Starr compiled a list of the songs he wished to record, and Martin and Beatles aide Neil Aspinall contacted the musical arrangers.

The material Starr selected included works from the big band era and songs well known through recordings by Bing Crosby, Doris Day, Frank Sinatra, Fats Waller and Matt Munro. Starr explained their appeal in a 1990 interview: "I was brought up with all those songs, you know, my family used to sing those songs, my mother and my dad, my aunties and uncles. They were the first musical influences on me." He decided to have each song arranged by a different musician – ranging from his London associates Martin, Paul McCartney, Klaus Voormann and Maurice Gibb, to American arrangers and producers such as Richard Perry, Quincy Jones and Elmer Bernstein. (Note: Starr had been impressed with Perry's work on Tiny Tim's 1968 album God Bless Tiny Tim. Perry went on to produce Starr's first two rock solo albums over 1973–74, Ringo and Goodnight Vienna.) He thought the variety would add an element of interest to the project.

== Recording ==
=== October 1969 – January 1970 ===
The recording for Sentimental Journey was initially sporadic, as Starr was involved in other musical activities through to the end of 1969. These included participating in sessions for Leon Russell with George Harrison in October. He also played drums on Harrison's productions for Apple Records artists Doris Troy and Billy Preston.

The session musicians on the album were credited as the George Martin Orchestra. Although many of the arrangements incorporated drums and other rock instruments, Starr's role was confined to that of lead vocalist. Preston played keyboards on some of the songs. Aspinall recalled inviting some of the arrangers to create the backing tracks themselves, with their chosen musicians, and that the tapes were then sent to London for Starr to add his vocals. EMI engineer Phil McDonald was the main recording engineer in London, and Geoff Emerick prepared some of the mixes for the album. Sessions began on 27 October, when Starr, backed by an orchestra, recorded "Night and Day" at EMI Studios (now Abbey Road Studios). Martin conducted the orchestra from an arrangement by Chico O'Farrill. The track was mixed the same day. (Note: Author Bill Harry states that on 1 October, Starr asked Count Basie to write an arrangement for "Night and Day", and the finished score arrived with Starr on 6 October. The album credits list O'Farrill, Basie's arranger, for the song's arrangement.)

The next session took place on 6 November at Wessex Sound Studios. Starr and the orchestra, conducted by Martin, recorded "Stormy Weather", although the song was omitted from the album. The following day, they recorded the backing track for the McCartney-arranged "Stardust", which nearly earned the album the title of Ringo Stardust. On 14 November, Starr added his vocal to "Stardust" and began recording "Dream". Arranged by Martin, the latter was finished on 18 November at Trident Studios. The backing track for "Blue, Turning Grey Over You", from an arrangement by jazz bandleader Oliver Nelson, was taped on 28 November and completed on 4 December, although Starr did not record his vocal until early in 1970.

Returning to other projects, Starr spent time promoting The Magic Christian, a film in which he co-starred with Peter Sellers. This included being filmed at several London locations for a BBC2 documentary devoted to him, for the show Late Night Line-Up. He also appeared on With a Little Help from My Friends, an all-star television tribute to Martin that was first broadcast on the ITV network on 24 December. For the latter, Starr lip-synched to his Abbey Road composition "Octopus's Garden" in a Yorkshire Television studio on 14 December, after recording a new vocal at EMI on 8 December. (Note: The overdubbing was done to allow Starr to mime to the song without violating Musicians' Union restrictions on TV performances. The track was also altered through the replacement of the original lead guitar, piano and bass parts.) On 3 January 1970, he joined Harrison and McCartney to record "I Me Mine" and add overdubs to "Let It Be", for their inclusion on the album accompanying the documentary film from the Get Back sessions, now titled Let It Be.

On 14 January, at Olympic Sound Studios, Starr recorded his vocals for "Love Is a Many Splendored Thing" and "Sentimental Journey". The backing track for "Love Is a Many Splendored Thing" had been taped at A&M Studios in Los Angeles on 26 December, when Jones conducted a 27-piece orchestra playing his arrangement. The Perry-arranged "Sentimental Journey" was also recorded in the US late the previous year; the backing featured an unusual mix of instruments, including a "talking guitar" solo. On 26 January, Starr and his wife Maureen Starkey left for the US to attend the premiere of The Magic Christian and promote the film. (Note: While in Los Angeles, Starr taped an appearance for NBC-TV's Rowan & Martin's Laugh-In. The show aired on 23 February and was one of several examples of Starr establishing his comedic persona as a solo artist.)

=== February–March 1970 ===
Authors Chip Madinger and Mark Easter write that after the intermittent recording since October the previous year, work on Starr's debut album began "in earnest" in early February 1970. From this point, EMI's Studio 2 became the main location. A 3 February session was devoted to a remake of "Love Is a Many Splendored Thing", since Jones and Martin were unhappy with the previous recording. Jones flew to London to work on the new version; Starr recorded a vocal that day, only to replace it on 5 February. (Note: In a 2018 interview, Jones recalled Starr attempting to fix a four-bar section of a drum part, without success, for "three hours". Jones said that, in Starr's absence, he and Martin then summoned jazz drummer Ronnie Verrell, who "came in for 15 minutes and tore it up".) More time was spent on "Love Is a Many Splendored Thing" than on any other song, as strings were then added to the remake on 17 February, followed by backing vocals and further instrumentation on the 19th.

On 9 February, Starr added his vocal to Bernstein's arrangement of "Have I Told You Lately That I Love You?", which had been taped at A&M on 3 February. At Martin's urging, Starr recorded an improved vocal part on 18 February. "I'm a Fool to Care" was recorded at EMI on 11 February. Voormann, the song's arranger, conducted a 15-piece jazz orchestra and Starr added his vocal track. On 12 February, a 31-piece orchestra and a chorus of nine singers recorded Les Reed's arrangement of "Let the Rest of the World Go By". Starr added his vocal that day but then replaced it on 18 February. On 17 February, Francis Shaw conducted a 15-piece string section as a final addition to "I'm a Fool to Care". Following the 18 February overdubbing session, Starr taped an early version of his rock song "It Don't Come Easy" (then titled "You Gotta Pay Your Dues"), with Harrison directing the musicians. (Note: Produced by Harrison, "It Don't Come Easy" became the A-side of Starr's first rock single, in 1971.)

On 20 February, final mixing took place on "I'm a Fool to Care", "Let the Rest of the World Go By", "Sentimental Journey" and "Have I Told You Lately That I Love You?" Starr recorded his vocal for "Blue, Turning Grey Over You" on 24 February. At De Lane Lea Studios the following day, Johnny Dankworth conducted a 20-piece orchestra on his arrangement of "You Always Hurt the One You Love"; Starr then added his vocal to the track. The songs "Autumn Leaves" and "I'll Be Looking at the Moon" were thought to be outtakes from the February 1970 sessions and were subsequently sought out by collectors. According to Madinger and Easter, however, studio documentation does not support their existence, and the two songs were merely listed as candidates for inclusion in a contemporaneous magazine article. (Note: The same article named potential musical arrangers such as Henry Mancini and Sinatra associates Nelson Riddle and Billy May, none of whom contributed to Starr's album.)

Starr and Martin moved to Morgan Sound Studios on 5 March, at McCartney's suggestion. They taped the basic tracks, with a 36-piece orchestra, for "Whispering Grass (Don't Tell the Trees)", arranged by Ron Goodwin, and the Gibb-arranged "Bye Bye Blackbird". Goodwin and Gibb each conducted the orchestra and Starr added vocals to both songs. On 6 March, recording for the album was completed at Morgan, with the addition of saxophone (played by Dankworth), drums and piano on "You Always Hurt the One You Love". This and four other tracks were mixed that evening at EMI Studios.

== Packaging and promotional film ==
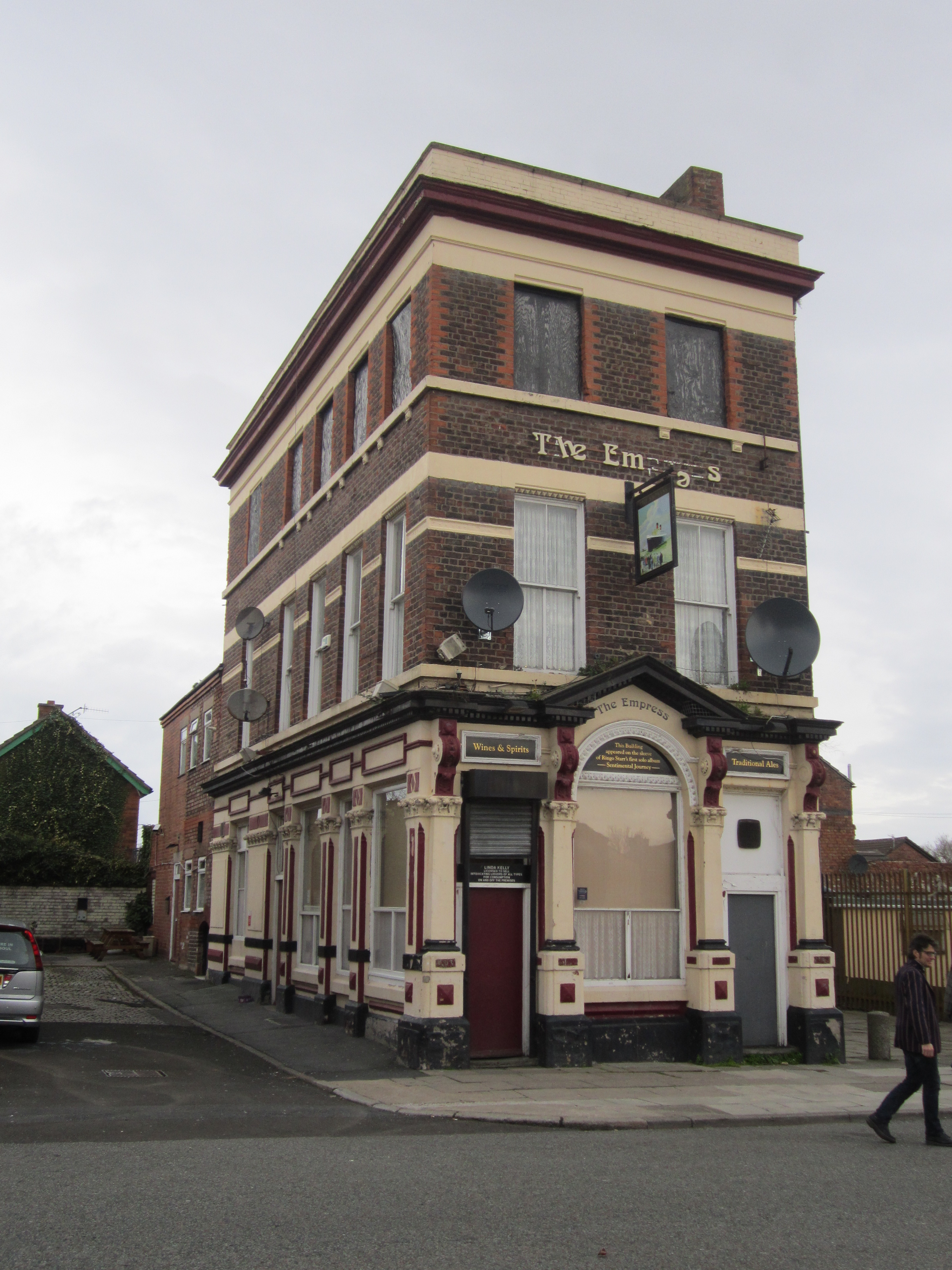
The Empress pub, which was pictured on the album cover

The album was first announced in December 1969 with the title Ringo Stardust. Beatles historian Bruce Spizer comments on the aptness of the eventual title, since Starr was "literally taking his fans on a sentimental journey" through his choice of songs.

The LP cover consisted of a photograph by Richard Polak, showing the Empress pub in Dingle, the area of Liverpool where Starr grew up. The Empress was his local pub as a young man; according to author Alan Clayson, in past decades, all of the album's standards would have been sung by happy patrons in the bar there. (Note: In Starr's recollection, he first heard the songs when members of his family and friends of his mother returned from the Empress and held parties at the family home.) A photo of Starr dressed in a tuxedo was superimposed so that he appears to be standing at the door to the pub. The figures in the windows are his relatives, superimposed from family photos. (Note: Starr's mother and stepfather appear in one of the first-floor windows.) The back cover had a photo of Starr in casual clothing, standing outside a building and gesturing towards the wall. The track listing, with the name of each arranger, and other album credits appear in white as if printed on the wall.

To promote the album, Starr made a promotional film for the title track, which was directed by Aspinall and shot before an invited audience at the Talk of the Town nightclub on 15 March 1970. Starr sang the song live over a mix of the studio recording in which his main vocal had been removed, and the Talk of the Town Orchestra, conducted by Martin, played along behind him. Doris Troy, Madeline Bell and Marsha Hunt appeared as backing singers.

In author John Winn's description, in its grand production, the "Sentimental Journey" clip rivals the sequence for "Your Mother Should Know" that closed the Beatles' 1967 TV film Magical Mystery Tour. The stage backdrop contained the LP cover image blown up and expanded to include more of the Dingle neighbourhood. Large flags hung down from each side of the set; midway through the song, from opposite sides of the stage, male dancers appear from under the American Stars and Stripes and female dancers appear from under the British Union Jack to congregate around Starr. Towards the end, a large platform carrying Troy, Bell and Hunt lowers from the ceiling.

== Release ==
Apple Records released Sentimental Journey in the UK on 27 March 1970 (with the catalogue number Apple PCS 7101) and in the US on 24 April (as Apple SW 3365). Following avant-garde and other experimental solo albums by Harrison and Lennon (the latter in collaboration with Yoko Ono) since 1968, it was the first studio album in the popular music vein by an individual Beatle. The "Sentimental Journey" promo clip first aired on Frost on Saturday on 29 March, during Starr's live appearance on the show. In the US, it was shown on The Ed Sullivan Show on 17 May. Starr also promoted the album with interviews for BBC Radio 1's Scene and Heard, BBC Radio 2 and Radio Luxembourg.

The release of Sentimental Journey was the source of friction between Starr and McCartney, who was estranged from his bandmates due to their appointment of Allen Klein to manage the band's Apple Corps organisation. McCartney refused to have his debut solo album, McCartney, held back in Apple's release schedule to allow for Sentimental Journey and the Beatles' Let It Be album. The two musicians had a heated exchange at McCartney's St John's Wood home on 31 March, when Starr personally delivered a letter from Harrison and Lennon explaining the need to delay the release of McCartney. (Note: The letter also mentioned the Beatles' Hey Jude compilation, which had been issued in the US on 26 February.) To placate McCartney, Starr conceded the point, but the confrontation contributed to McCartney announcing the Beatles' break-up in his promotion for McCartney. (Note: The release of Sentimental Journey thereby took place before the break-up in the UK but after it in the US.)

According to NME critic Bob Woffinden, the album was seen as a "grievous faux pas" amid the publicity surrounding McCartney's announcement on 9 April, since it appeared as though Starr had similarly tried to launch a solo career on the news that the Beatles had broken up. Starr later rued that, because McCartney was issued so soon after his record, it "slayed" Sentimental Journey. The album peaked at number 7 on the UK Albums Chart and number 22 on the US Billboard Top LPs chart, despite the lack of a supporting single. (Note: In his interview for Scene and Heard, on 25 March, Starr told reporter David Wigg that "Sentimental Journey" and "Whispering Grass" were contenders for a single, and that he favoured the latter song.) In the US national charts compiled by Cash Box and Record World, it reached number 21 and number 20, respectively. The album sold 500,000 copies there within the first two weeks of release, but failed to achieve gold certification by the Recording Industry Association of America as McCartney and Let It Be did.

In music journalist Paul Moody's description, Sentimental Journey established Starr as "the rootsiest and least affected of the Fab Four". In a Radio 1 interview with Johnny Moran, Harrison described it as "a great album" and "really nice". By contrast, Lennon told Rolling Stone editor Jann Wenner in December 1970 that he was "embarrassed" by the record. Starr later likened the project to "the first shovel of coal in the furnace that makes the train inch forward". He told music journalist Paul Du Noyer in 2001: "if it did nothing else it got me off my bum, back into recording. Then I started to write a bit, and I did 'It Don't Come Easy', 'Back Off Boogaloo', tracks that George Harrison co-wrote with me." Following the album's release, he considered offers for a Las Vegas concert season, performing for hotel diners in the style of Elvis Presley's engagements at the International, but decided against it. (Note: Starr and his wife attended a Presley show in Las Vegas on 30 January, the day after the Los Angeles premiere of The Magic Christian. Negotiations began for a TV special starring Presley, Starr and Raquel Welch but Starr said he had to pull out as the preparations were "dragging on too long": "I told Elvis I couldn't wait – it was holding me up – and he could see my point.")

Capitol Records released a budget edition of the album in February 1981. Sentimental Journey was remastered and reissued on CD in 1995, on 1 May in the UK and on 15 August in the US. The promotional clip for the title track appeared on the CD/DVD version of Photograph: The Very Best of Ringo Starr.

== Critical reception ==
=== Contemporary reviews ===
Sentimental Journey received an unenthusiastic response from music critics. According to Beatles biographer Nicholas Schaffner, the reaction from critics and fans was "one of embarrassed silence", while journalist John Blake said it was the subject of derision. In his review for Rolling Stone, Greil Marcus called the album "horrendous" but added, "at least it's classy." He also wrote: "There is a certain thrill to hearing Ringo swing immediately and finally flat on 'Stardust', reportedly Judy Agnew's favorite song. She won't like this version, which just might keep Ringo from being presented with an invitation to sing one of the nominated songs on next year's Academy Awards show. But a Grammy seems inevitable."

In a review that Alan Clayson highlights as especially kind, Andy Gray of the NME said that Starr's singing might surprise listeners, as it was not instantly recognisable as him, and was "mostly ... on the beat and on the melody line". Gray described the arrangements as "top-class" and predicted "healthy sales" for the LP.

John Gabree of High Fidelity considered that the impressive cast of musical arrangers was merely "compensating for the fact that Ringo can't sing" and dismissed most of the material as "some of the tiredest junk ever written". Village Voice critic Robert Christgau said the album's appeal was confined to "over-fifties and Ringomaniacs". In Stereo Review, Don Heckman wrote that Sentimental Journey suggested that Starr had long hidden "the heart of a determined romantic" behind his Charlie Chaplin-like acceptance of his standing as the Beatles' "comic relief". Heckman criticised the selection of standards as "unbelievably hoary" but said the contrast in arrangements was stranger still, from O'Farrill's "pseudo-Basie" contribution to Bernstein's "Hollywood Bowl rock".

=== Retrospective assessments and legacy ===
Professional ratings
Review scores
Source	Rating
AllMusic	3/5 stars
Christgau's Record Guide	C−
The Encyclopedia of Popular Music	2/5 stars
The Essential Rock Discography	5/10
MusicHound Rock	3/5 stars
The Rolling Stone Album Guide	2.5/5 stars

Writing in the late 1970s, NME critics Roy Carr and Tony Tyler called the record "a gawky, badly sung, overly sentimental selection of moribund mambos" and "the most embarrassing (to date) of all Beatles solo excursions". Bob Woffinden described it as a project that "begged failure" due to the material and the unsuitability of Starr's voice, and because, even if Starr had sung them "perfectly", the Beatles had "revolutionised popular music" and provided a "fresh set of classics" that made such sentimental songs redundant. He also rued that, after fans had bought the album out of loyalty, they were then wary of Starr's far more worthy follow-up, Beaucoups of Blues. (Note: Squeeze songwriter Chris Difford recalled thinking that the only positive thing to come from the Beatles' break-up was the chance to buy "four Beatles [solo] albums a year", but "then I heard Ringo's first album. I left it at a party one night.")

NPR music critic Tim Riley reacted more favourably: "Backed by full jazz band and occasional strings, Ringo poses as a Liverpudlian Jack Jones, with surprisingly good results." Riley added that the album had "a deceptively easy feel, and the strongest moments ... ('Dream' and 'Blue, Turning Grey Over You' ...) confirm his fundamental appeal as a personality."

Sentimental Journey predated standards collections by other rock artists, including Harry Nilsson's A Little Touch of Schmilsson in the Night, Linda Ronstadt's What's New and Rod Stewart's It Had to Be You: The Great American Songbook. On this point, William Ruhlmann of AllMusic writes: "Coming more than a decade before the fad for standards albums by rock-era pop stars like Linda Ronstadt, the album was taken not as a career move, but as a highly eccentric and expensive novelty of a kind only Beatles could afford to indulge. In retrospect, it remains harmlessly charming, if unexceptional."

Bruce Spizer comments that Starr's album was "indeed novel" for a rock musician, particularly as he was yet to turn 30 and big band music was highly unfashionable in 1970. In addition to citing Ronstadt's 1980s albums with arranger Nelson Riddle and Stewart's series of Great American Songbook releases, Spizer views it as a precursor for "aging rockers" such as Bryan Ferry with As Time Goes By and Boz Scaggs with But Beautiful to "belatedly [jump] on the big band wagon" over subsequent decades. (Note: McCartney also released an album of standards, Kisses on the Bottom, in 2012, recalling songs from his formative years in Liverpool, including "Bye Bye Blackbird". In 1981, Harrison had included two Hoagy Carmichael favourites from his childhood on his Somewhere in England album.) In 2017, following Bob Dylan's recent albums exploring the Great American Songbook, Pitchfork included Sentimental Journey in its list of eight recommended standards collections that "surprise" and "involve artists finding themselves within songs meant for all". The writer admired Martin's production and said that Starr's "everyman charm" bypassed his vocal limitations and ensured that the selections became "his own".

== Track listing ==
Side one
No.	Title	Writer(s)	Arranger	Length
1.	"Sentimental Journey"	Bud Green, Les Brown, Ben Homer	Richard Perry	3:26
2.	"Night and Day"	Cole Porter	Chico O'Farrill	2:25
3.	"Whispering Grass (Don't Tell the Trees)"	Fred Fisher, Doris Fisher	Ron Goodwin	2:37
4.	"Bye Bye Blackbird"	Mort Dixon, Ray Henderson	Maurice Gibb	2:11
5.	"I'm a Fool to Care"	Ted Daffan	Klaus Voormann	2:39
6.	"Stardust"	Hoagy Carmichael, Mitchell Parish	Paul McCartney	3:22

Side two
No.	Title	Writer(s)	Arranger	Length
1.	"Blue, Turning Grey over You"	Andy Razaf, Fats Waller	Oliver Nelson	3:19
2.	"Love Is a Many Splendored Thing"	Sammy Fain, Paul Francis Webster	Quincy Jones	3:05
3.	"Dream"	Johnny Mercer	George Martin	2:42
4.	"You Always Hurt the One You Love"	Allan Roberts, Doris Fisher	John Dankworth	2:20
5.	"Have I Told You Lately That I Love You?"	Scott Wiseman	Elmer Bernstein	2:44
6.	"Let the Rest of the World Go By"	Ernest R. Ball, J. Keirn Brennan	Les Reed	2:55

== Personnel ==
According to Bruce Spizer's book The Beatles Solo on Apple Records (except where noted):

- Ringo Starr – vocals
- Billy Preston – piano on "I'm a Fool to Care", organ on "Love Is a Many Splendored Thing"
- George Martin – conductor on "Night and Day", "Dream" and "Sentimental Journey"
- Ron Goodwin – conductor on "Whispering Grass"
- Maurice Gibb – conductor on "Bye Bye Blackbird"
- Klaus Voormann – conductor on "I'm a Fool to Care"
- Francis Shaw – conductor on "I'm a Fool to Care" (supplementary strings) and "Love Is a Many Splendored Thing"
- Johnnie Spence – conductor on "Blue, Turning Grey Over You"
- John Dankworth – orchestral conductor and saxophone on "You Always Hurt the One You Love"
- Les Reed – conductor on "Let the Rest of the World Go By"

== Charts ==
Chart (1970)	Peak position
Australian Albums (Kent Music Report)	15
Canada Top Albums/CDs (RPM)	42
Italian Albums (Musica e Dischi)	14
Japanese Albums (Oricon)	59
UK Albums (Official Charts)	7
US Billboard 200	22
