= Early 1970 =

- Picture sleeve (reverse)

Single by Ringo Starr
- A-side: "It Don't Come Easy"
- Released: 9 April 1971
- Recorded: October 1970
- Studio: EMI, London
- Genre: Rock
- Length: 2:21
- Label: Apple
- Songwriter(s): Richard Starkey
- Producer(s): Ringo Starr

Ringo Starr singles chronology
"Beaucoups of Blues" (1970)	"It Don't Come Easy" / "Early 1970" (1971)	"Back Off Boogaloo" (1972)

"Early 1970" is a song by the English rock musician Ringo Starr that was released as the B-side of his April 1971 single "It Don't Come Easy". A rare example of Starr's songwriting at the time, it was inspired by the break-up of the Beatles and documents his relationship with his three former bandmates. The lyrics to the verses comment in turn on Paul McCartney, John Lennon and George Harrison as individuals, and the likelihood of each of them making music with Starr again. In the final verse, Starr offers a self-deprecating picture of his musical abilities and expresses the hope that all four will play together in the future. Commentators have variously described "Early 1970" as "a rough draft of a peace treaty" and "a disarming open letter" from Starr to Lennon, McCartney and Harrison.

The song's working title was "When Four Nights Come to Town". Starr recorded the basic track in London in October 1970, midway through the sessions for Lennon's John Lennon/Plastic Ono Band album, and then completed the recording with Harrison. Apple Corps manager Allen Klein suggested that the three former Beatles invite McCartney to contribute, to weaken the latter's case for the band's legal dissolution, but this did not take place.

== Background and inspiration ==
It was a relief once we finally said we would split up ... I sat in the garden for a while wondering what the hell to do with my life. After you've said it's over and go home, you think: "Oh, God – that's it, then. Now what do you do?" It was quite a dramatic period for me – or traumatic, actually.

– Ringo Starr recalling his reaction to John Lennon saying he was leaving the Beatles

As the Beatles' drummer, and only a nascent songwriter, Ringo Starr felt lost when the band broke up. Although the official announcement came on 10 April 1970, the group's demise was initiated by John Lennon's statement during a September 1969 band meeting that he wanted a "divorce" from his fellow Beatles. In a February 1970 interview in Look magazine, midway through sessions for his first solo album, Sentimental Journey, Starr explained his disorientation: "I keep looking around and thinking where are they? What are they doing? When will they come back and talk to me?" Beatles historian Bruce Spizer writes that these sentiments "form the basis" of Starr's composition "Early 1970".

Discussing the song in a 2001 interview, Starr said it reflected how he could count on Lennon and George Harrison's musical support after the break-up, but not on Paul McCartney's. A rift had grown between Starr and McCartney in March 1970 due to McCartney's refusal to have his own debut solo album held back in Apple Records' release schedule to allow for Sentimental Journey and the Beatles' Let It Be album, and thereby avoid saturating the market with Beatles product. The two musicians had a heated exchange at McCartney's St John's Wood home on 31 March. The confrontation had what Beatles biographer Peter Doggett terms a "grievous effect" on Starr and McCartney's friendship, and contributed to the latter announcing his departure from the band. In the same 2001 interview, Starr recalled that "Early 1970" was also informed by McCartney's subsequent attempts to be released from the band's Apple record label and the acrimony this created.

== Composition ==
The song's working title was variously "When I Come to Town (Four Nights in Moscow)" and "When Four Nights Come to Town". Spizer describes "Early 1970" as a "country-flavored" track. It followed Starr's full immersion in the country music genre on his Beaucoups of Blues album, a project that resulted from meeting Nashville session musician and producer Pete Drake when they both worked on Harrison's All Things Must Pass in June 1970.

The four verses focus on each of the Beatles in turn, providing what Beatles Forever author Nicholas Schaffner describes as "a disarming open letter" to Lennon, McCartney and Harrison. The lyrics gauge Starr's relationships with his bandmates according to how likely each one was to make music with him in the future. In author Andrew Grant Jackson's view, the verses suggest a group dynamic similar to the opening scene of the Beatles' 1964 film A Hard Day's Night, when Starr, Lennon and Harrison are seen sharing a laugh and enjoying each other's company, while McCartney is removed and remote. (Note: Jackson adds: "Now the loner was instituting legal proceedings to allow him to leave the gang permanently.")

In the first verse, Starr addresses his strained relationship with McCartney. The lyrics depict McCartney as full of "charm" and engrossed in his domestic life – on his Scottish farm with his wife Linda Eastman and their newborn daughter Mary. Starr concludes the verse by singing, "And when he comes to town I wonder if he'll play with me."

In verse two, he refers to Lennon and his wife Yoko Ono's 1969 bed-ins for peace and, in the line "They screamed and they cried, now they're free", to their recent experiences on Arthur Janov's primal therapy course. The latter treatment inspired the couple's 1970 solo albums, John Lennon/Plastic Ono Band and Yoko Ono/Plastic Ono Band, both of which feature Starr on drums. The verse ends with Starr asserting of Lennon: "And when he comes to town, I know he's gonna play with me."

In the third verse, Starr describes Harrison as "a long-haired, cross-legged guitar picker" whose wife, former model Pattie Boyd, picks daisies for his vegetarian meals. Author Robert Rodriguez writes that Harrison's workload following the September 1969 release of the Beatles' Abbey Road album displayed the same "workaholic tendencies" traditionally associated with McCartney; these projects usually involved Starr, and Starr depicts Harrison as the bandmate most likely to continue working with him. (Note: Their shared activities included sessions for American singer Leon Russell and for Harrison-produced albums by Apple artists Billy Preston and Doris Troy.) He closes the verse by describing Harrison as "always in town playing for you with me", so much so that the guitarist rarely sees his recently purchased Friar Park estate.

In the song's autobiographical final verse, Starr refers to his own musical shortcomings:

I play guitar – A, D, E
I don't play bass, 'cause that's too hard for me
I play the piano if it's in C ...

He concludes the song by declaring, "And when I go to town I wanna see all three" – a statement that music journalist Bob Woffinden takes as being an admission by Starr that he "clearly needed the support" of Lennon, McCartney and Harrison.

== Recording ==
At that point, I felt that when John comes to town, I know he's gonna play with me, and if George comes to town, I know he'll play with me, and if Paul comes to town, I "wonder" if he's gonna play. We were going through that Apple nonsense, where Paul was suing the three of us. And he was angry, and we were angry, and I was wondering when that would stop.

– Ringo Starr, 2001

Starr taped the basic track for the song, as "When I Come to Town (Four Knights in Moscow)", at EMI Studios (now Abbey Road Studios) on 3 October 1970, during a lull in the sessions for John Lennon/Plastic Ono Band. (Note: Some commentators suggest that the mention of "cookie" in the lyrics to Lennon's Plastic Ono Band track "Hold On" led to Starr including the word in his "Early 1970" verse about Lennon.) In their book Eight Arms to Hold You, authors Chip Madinger and Mark Easter comment on the difficulty in ascertaining reliable information on the song's recording; Spizer similarly cites "[f]ading memories" as a hindrance to identifying the precise line-up of musicians. Starr biographer Alan Clayson states that Lennon produced this initial session, while Doggett writes of Lennon merely participating in the recording, along with Starr and bassist Klaus Voormann. (Note: Neither Madinger and Easter nor Spizer acknowledge Lennon on the recording, for which Starr is credited as sole producer.) Starr subsequently completed the track with Harrison, who finished his production of the drummer's "It Don't Come Easy" at this time. (Note: Harrison was at Abbey Road carrying out final mixing on All Things Must Pass while Lennon and Starr were recording Plastic Ono Band.)

In addition to his drum part, Starr played rhythm acoustic guitar on "Early 1970". According to Voormann's recollection, Starr overdubbed the opening dobro part and, in verse four, brief snatches of the various instruments on which he admits his musical limitations: the three guitar chords he names, a walking bass line, and a piano vamp following the third line of the verse. Harrison played rhythm and lead electric guitar, and a slide guitar part of which Madinger and Easter write: "George's distinctive slide solo after his 'section' of the song confirms his solidarity with Ringo, if nothing else." Harrison also joined Starr on piano for the verse-four fill, playing the C chord high up the keyboard. A piano enters during the verse dedicated to Lennon; in Jackson's view, its energetic quality signals the easy relationship Starr enjoyed with him. Although Harrison's friend Gary Wright overdubbed piano on "It Don't Come Easy" that same month, no one is credited for the main piano part on "Early 1970".

Allen Klein, the manager of Starr, Harrison and Lennon, suggested inviting McCartney to participate in the recording of the song, thinking that his involvement would undermine any legal moves McCartney might make to quit the Beatles. No such collaboration took place, and McCartney filed a suit in London's High Court on 31 December to dissolve the band's business partnership.

== Release ==
Starr chose "Early 1970" as the B-side of his first solo single in the UK, the lead side of which was "It Don't Come Easy". The single was issued by Apple Records on 9 April 1971, four weeks after the High Court had ruled in McCartney's favour. Writing in early March, Alan Smith of the NME deplored the hostility that had come to light in the court proceedings and recent interviews, highlighting newspaper headlines such as "Paul was a spoilt child, says Ringo", although he acknowledged that Starr "still feels it would be possible for the Beatles to resolve their differences". (Note: Amid this media speculation, rumours claimed that Lennon, Harrison and Starr were to form a band with Voormann, named the Ladders. Lennon told an interviewer that it was "90 per cent" likely that he, Harrison and Starr would record together again, "but maybe not as the Beatles". The rumour gained in intensity when Voormann moved into Friar Park to escape the press.) According to Doggett, whereas "Early 1970" had been "a rough draft of a peace treaty" originally, amid the unpleasantness surrounding the lawsuit, it "seem[ed] like a false memory of a mythic past, its Arcadia tangled with weeds".

"It Don't Come Easy" was an unexpected commercial success and outsold some of the singles released around that time by the other former Beatles. Schaffner recalled that for ardent fans, the "real intrigue lay in the B-side" and its insights into the Beatles' private world. During May, all four were in the Cannes area of the South of France. While attending Mick Jagger's wedding in St Tropez, Starr had an awkward reunion with McCartney, their first meeting in over a year. Although Starr later told Melody Maker that they "both knew that everything was OK" and merely "had to get warm together", he was also vocal in dismissing McCartney's new album, Ram, and its predecessor. (Note: In the same Melody Maker interview, Starr said that his recent session work for B.B. King and Howlin' Wolf meant no more to him than playing with Lennon or Harrison. He praised Lennon's individuality as a rhythm guitarist and described Harrison as "the best rock guitarist around".)

"Early 1970" received a second commercial release in November 1975, when included on Starr's Apple compilation Blast from Your Past. For the CD reissue of Starr's 1973 album Ringo in 1991, the original ten-song album was expanded with the addition of three bonus tracks, one of which was "Early 1970". The song also appeared on Photograph: The Very Best of Ringo Starr, issued in 2007.

== Critical reception ==
In his single review for Record Mirror, Peter Jones predicted a top-five hit for the A-side and said that "Early 1970" offered "pertinent comments on how the Beatles as individuals are getting on", adding, "Don't miss this side." Village Voice critic Robert Christgau, reflecting on the solo Beatles following Starr's appearance at Harrison's Concert for Bangladesh shows in August 1971, wrote that the song showed him to be "the ultimate Beatle fan". He cited it as typical of Starr's demeanour, in that he was content to defer to his more ambitious colleagues, having joined the band as a replacement drummer, and of how he served as the people's "representative" for fans mourning the group's break-up. (Note: Christgau nevertheless predicted that, just as fans struggled with the wider social implications of the break-up, Starr's position was the most vulnerable. He concluded: "since Ringo is all of us, we'd better figure out what there is for us now that we can't be Beatle fans any longer.")

Writing in 1973 – by which time the four ex-Beatles had united against Klein – Alan Betrock of Phonograph Record commented on the former bandmates' "backward glances" in their music since the break-up. He concluded that "Ringo's little-known B-side 'Early 1970' was probably the sharpest commentary on their whole lot." Reviewing Blast from Your Past for the NME, however, Bob Woffinden dismissed the track as "a period curiosity, interesting at the time, but of little substance".

Among Beatles biographers, Alan Clayson opines that the commercial success of "It Don't Come Easy" gave Starr "instant self-esteem" at a time of uncertainty, but the B-side would have "gone in one ear and out the other" had it not been for the song's subject matter. Chris Ingham, writing in The Rough Guide to the Beatles, highlights it as one of the more tempered responses to the break-up relative to the "musical sniping" in Harrison's "Wah-Wah", McCartney's "Too Many People" and especially Lennon's "How Do You Sleep?" He describes "Early 1970" as a song with "affectionate, comic" verses that "accentuated the human aspect of losing the old gang". Robert Rodriguez deems the track "utterly charming" with a "delicious slide guitar part", and adds: "'Early 1970' was the perfect tonic for beleaguered Beatles fans wondering if the band would ever, if not get back together, at least achieve some civility." Bruce Spizer similarly views it as a "charming delight". (Note: In 2017, while promoting the expanded edition of Harrison's 1980 autobiography I, Me, Mine, his widow Olivia Harrison discussed the discovery of an unreleased song he wrote for Starr in the early 1970s, titled "Hey Ringo". In the song's lyrics, Harrison states that Starr's drumming provided an essential, complementary quality to his own playing, with lines such as "Hey Ringo, now I want you to know / That without you my guitar plays far too slow".)

== Personnel ==
According to Bruce Spizer (except where noted):

- Ringo Starr – vocals, drums, acoustic guitar, dobro, standup bass (verse 4 fill), piano (verse 4 fill), backing vocals
- George Harrison – electric guitars, slide guitar, piano (verse 4 fill)
- Klaus Voormann – bass
- uncredited – piano

== Sources ==
- Badman, Keith (2001). The Beatles Diary Volume 2: After the Break-Up 1970–2001. London: Omnibus Press. ISBN 978-0-7119-8307-6.
- The Beatles (2000). The Beatles Anthology. San Francisco, CA: Chronicle Books. ISBN 978-0-8118-2684-6.
- Castleman, Harry; Podrazik, Walter J. (1976). All Together Now: The First Complete Beatles Discography 1961–1975. New York, NY: Ballantine Books. ISBN 0-345-25680-8.
- Clayson, Alan (2003). Ringo Starr. London: Sanctuary. ISBN 1-86074-488-5.
- Doggett, Peter (2011). You Never Give Me Your Money: The Beatles After the Breakup. New York, NY: It Books. ISBN 978-0-06-177418-8.
- Hertsgaard, Mark (1996). A Day in the Life: The Music and Artistry of the Beatles. London: Pan Books. ISBN 0-330-33891-9.
- Ingham, Chris (2003). The Rough Guide to the Beatles. London: Rough Guides. ISBN 1-84353-140-2.
- Jackson, Andrew Grant (2012). Still the Greatest: The Essential Solo Beatles Songs. Lanham, MD: Scarecrow Press. ISBN 978-0-8108-8222-5.
- Leng, Simon (2006). While My Guitar Gently Weeps: The Music of George Harrison. Milwaukee, WI: Hal Leonard. ISBN 978-1-4234-0609-9.
- Madinger, Chip; Easter, Mark (2000). Eight Arms to Hold You: The Solo Beatles Compendium. Chesterfield, MO: 44.1 Productions. ISBN 0-615-11724-4.
- Miles, Barry (2001). The Beatles Diary Volume 1: The Beatles Years. London: Omnibus Press. ISBN 0-7119-8308-9.
- O'Dell, Chris; Ketcham, Katherine (2009). Miss O'Dell: My Hard Days and Long Nights with The Beatles, The Stones, Bob Dylan, Eric Clapton, and the Women They Loved. New York, NY: Touchstone. ISBN 978-1-4165-9093-4.
- Rodriguez, Robert (2010). Fab Four FAQ 2.0: The Beatles' Solo Years, 1970–1980. Milwaukee, WI: Backbeat Books. ISBN 978-1-4165-9093-4.
- Schaffner, Nicholas (1978). The Beatles Forever. New York, NY: McGraw-Hill. ISBN 0-07-055087-5.
- Spizer, Bruce (2005). The Beatles Solo on Apple Records. New Orleans, LA: 498 Productions. ISBN 0-9662649-5-9.
- Woffinden, Bob (1981). The Beatles Apart. London: Proteus. ISBN 0-906071-89-5.
