= Photograph: The Very Best of Ringo Starr =

Greatest hits album by Ringo Starr
- Released: 27 August 2007
- Recorded: 1970–2005
- Genre: Rock
- Length: 67:53
- Label: Apple
- Producer: Richard Perry; Ringo Starr; Arif Mardin; Don Was; Mark Hudson; George Harrison

Ringo Starr chronology
Ringo Starr and Friends (2006)	Photograph: The Very Best of Ringo Starr (2007)	Ringo Starr: Live at Soundstage (2007)

Professional ratings
Review scores
Source	Rating
AllMusic	4.5/5 stars
BBC	(favourable)
IGN	8.8/10
No Ripcord	8/10
The Music Box	3.5/5 stars
PopMatters	7/10
prefix	4.0/10
Record Collector	4/5 stars

Photograph: The Very Best of Ringo Starr (the last word visually rendered as) is a career-spanning best-of compilation album by Ringo Starr and is the first such album since the releases of 1975's Blast from Your Past and 1989's Starr Struck: Best of Ringo Starr, Vol. 2. The album was released in the UK on 27 August 2007, and in the US on 28 August.

== Overview ==
The release of the new collection coincided with the reissue of Starr's first four solo albums for EMI, in digital format, on 28 August 2007.

The tracks from 1970s and 1980s presented on the compilation featured updated mixes of the songs in comparison to Starr's 1990s CD reissues of his earlier albums.

Photograph contains all the tracks that appear on the earlier compilation Blast from Your Past.

The track listing and title for the release on digital and streaming platforms differs from the standard release. Unlike the standard CD release, the digital/streaming album contains "Oo-Wee" (from Goodnight Vienna), "Have You Seen My Baby" and an extended version of "Six O'Clock" (both from Ringo) in place of "Hey! Baby", "A Dose of Rock 'n' Roll" and "King of Broken Hearts". A digital booklet was also included with the purchase of the album on iTunes. Upon original release, the title was changed to Photograph: The Digital Hits on iTunes, but has since reverted back to Photograph: The Very Best of Ringo Starr. On streaming platforms (like Spotify), "Photograph" is omitted from the title, and is simply listed as the shortened The Very Best Of.

== Reception ==
The compilation debuted at number 26 on the UK Albums Chart on 2 September 2007. This achievement represented Starr's highest peak on that chart since 1974, when Goodnight Vienna reached number 30. Photograph: The Very Best of Ringo Starr stayed in the UK top 100 for three weeks. The album also had a two-week chart run in the United States, where it debuted at number 130 with 5,426 copies sold during the first week of release.

== Track listing ==
=== CD version ===
No.	Title	Writer(s)	Original release	Length
1.	"Photograph"	Richard Starkey, George Harrison	Ringo, 1973	3:58
2.	"It Don't Come Easy"	Starkey	non-album single, 1971	3:01
3.	"You're Sixteen (You're Beautiful and You're Mine)"	Bob Sherman, Richard Sherman	Ringo, 1973	2:49
4.	"Back Off Boogaloo"	Starkey	non-album single, 1972	3:19
5.	"I'm the Greatest"	John Lennon	Ringo, 1973	3:26
6.	"Oh My My"	Vini Poncia, Starkey	Ringo, 1973	4:15
7.	"Only You (And You Alone)"	Buck Ram, Ande Rand	Goodnight Vienna, 1974	3:24
8.	"Beaucoups of Blues"	Buzz Rabin	Beaucoups of Blues, 1970	2:33
9.	"Early 1970"	Starkey	B-side to "It Don't Come Easy"	2:18
10.	"Snookeroo"	Elton John, Bernie Taupin	Goodnight Vienna, 1974	3:24
11.	"No No Song"	Hoyt Axton, David Jackson	Goodnight Vienna, 1974	2:31
12.	"(It's All Down To) Goodnight Vienna"	Lennon	Goodnight Vienna, 1974	3:02
13.	"Hey! Baby"	Margaret Cobb, Bruce Channel	Ringo's Rotogravure, 1976	3:10
14.	"A Dose of Rock 'n' Roll"	Carl Groszmann	Ringo's Rotogravure, 1976	3:24
15.	"Weight of the World"	Brian O'Doherty, Fred Velez	Time Takes Time, 1992	3:54
16.	"King of Broken Hearts"	Starkey, Mark Hudson, Dean Grakal, Steve Dudas	Vertical Man, 1998	4:43
17.	"Never Without You"	Starkey, Hudson, Gary Nicholson	Ringo Rama, 2003	5:23
18.	"Act Naturally" (Duet with Buck Owens)	Johnny Russell, Voni Morrison	Act Naturally, 1989	3:00
19.	"Wrack My Brain"	Harrison	Stop and Smell the Roses, 1981	2:21
20.	"Fading In Fading Out"	Starkey, Hudson, Gary Burr	Choose Love, 2005	3:58
Total length:				67:53

=== Collector's edition DVD ===
1. "Sentimental Journey" (1970 promotional film)
2. "It Don't Come Easy" (1971 promotional film)
3. "Back Off Boogaloo" (1972 promotional film)
4. "You're Sixteen (You're Beautiful and You're Mine)" (1973 promotional film)
5. "Only You (And You Alone)" (1974 promotional film)
6. "Act Naturally" (with Buck Owens) (1989 music video)
7. "Goodnight Vienna" (1974 promotional film for album)

=== Digital/streaming version ===
No.	Title	Writer(s)	Original release	Length
1.	"Photograph"	Starkey, Harrison	Ringo, 1973	3:58
2.	"It Don't Come Easy"	Starkey	non-album single, 1971	3:01
3.	"You're Sixteen (You're Beautiful and You're Mine)"	Bob Sherman, Richard Sherman	Ringo, 1973	2:49
4.	"Back Off Boogaloo"	Starkey	non-album single, 1972	3:19
5.	"I'm the Greatest"	Lennon	Ringo, 1973	3:26
6.	"Oh My My"	Vini Poncia, Starkey	Ringo, 1973	4:15
7.	"Only You (And You Alone)"	Ram, Rand	Goodnight Vienna, 1974	3:24
8.	"Beaucoups of Blues"	Rabin	Beaucoups of Blues, 1970	2:33
9.	"Early 1970"	Starkey	B-side to "It Don't Come Easy"	2:18
10.	"Snookeroo"	John, Taupin	Goodnight Vienna, 1974	3:24
11.	"No No Song"	Axton, Jackson	Goodnight Vienna, 1974	2:31
12.	"(It's All Down To) Goodnight Vienna"	Lennon	Goodnight Vienna, 1974	3:01
13.	"Oo-Wee"	Poncia, Starkey	Goodnight Vienna, 1974	3:44
14.	"Have You Seen My Baby"	Randy Newman	Ringo, 1973	3:45
15.	"Six O'Clock" (Extended Version)	Paul McCartney, Linda McCartney	Ringo, 1973	5:23
16.	"Weight of the World"	O'Doherty, Velez	Time Takes Time, 1992	3:54
17.	"Never Without You"	Starkey, Hudson, Nicholson	Ringo Rama, 2003	5:23
18.	"Act Naturally" (Duet with Buck Owens)	Russell, Morrison	Act Naturally, 1989	3:00
19.	"Wrack My Brain"	Harrison	Stop and Smell the Roses, 1981	2:21
20.	"Fading In Fading Out"	Starkey, Hudson, Burr	Choose Love, 2005	3:58
Total length:				69:27

== Personnel ==
- Ringo Starr - vocals, drums, acoustic guitar (9), piano (9), percussion, keyboards (17)
- Buck Owens - vocals (18)
- Vini Poncia - acoustic guitars (1), guitars (3), harmony vocal (6), background vocals (14)
- Jimmy Calvert - acoustic guitars (1), guitars (3, 6)
- George Harrison - 12-string acoustic guitar (1), harmony vocals (1), guitar (2, 5), slide guitar (4, 9), acoustic guitar (9, 18), piano (9), slide guitar solo (16), lead guitar (19), background vocals (19)
- Stephen Stills - guitars (2)
- Jesse Ed Davis - electric guitar (7, 11), guitars (12, 14)
- Steve Cropper - electric guitar (7)
- Robbie Robertson - guitar (10)
- Peter Frampton, Danny Kortchmar - guitar (14)
- Mark Goldenberg - guitar (15)
- Steve Dudas - electric guitar (16,17), acoustic guitar (16)
- Mark Hudson - acoustic guitar (16, 20), bass, mellotron (16), keyboards (16), percussion (16), background vocals, electric guitar (20)
- Eric Clapton - guitar solo (17)
- Gary Burr - acoustic guitar (17,20), background vocals (17, 20), electric guitar (20)
- Gary Nicholson - 12-string acoustic guitar (17)
- Terry Christoffersen, Bill Lloyd, Reggie Young - guitar (18)
- Robert Randolph - lead guitar (20)
- Mark Mirando - electric guitar (20)
- Nicky Hopkins - piano (1,3), electric piano (11)
- Gary Wright - piano (2), keyboards (4)
- John Lennon - piano (5, 12), harmony vocal (5), acoustic guitar (7), inspiration (12)
- Billy Preston - organ (5, 6), piano (6), electric piano (7), clavinet (12)
- Elton John - piano (10)
- James Newton Howard - synthesizer (10)
- John Jarvis - keyboards (13)
- Dr. John - keyboards (14)
- Benmont Tench - keyboards (15)
- Jim Cox - Wurlitzer (16), B2 organ (17), horn arrangement (20)
- Jim Shaw - piano (18)
- Al Kooper - piano (19), electric guitar (19)
- Ray Cooper - piano (19), percussion (19), vocoder (19), background vocals (19)
- Fortuna - accordion (12)
- Klaus Voormann - bass, sax (4), acoustic guitar (9), dobro (9)
- Cooker Lo Presti - bass (13)
- James "Hutch" Hutchinson - bass (15)
- Doyle Curtsinger - bass (18)
- Herbie Flowers - bass (19), tuba (19)
- Jim Keltner - drums
- Jim McCarty - drums (18)
- Lon Van Eaton - percussion (1), guitars (12, 13), horns (12)
- Derrek Van Eaton - percussion (1)
- Bobby Keyes - tenor sax solo (1), horns
- Ron Cattermole - saxophones (2), trumpets (2)
- Tom Scott - sax solo (6), horn arrangement (6)
- Jim Horn - horn arrangement (6)
- Trevor Lawrence - horns
- Steve Madaio - horns (10, 12)
- Chuck Findley - horns (10)
- Randy Brecker - trumpet (13, 14)
- Alan Young, Michael Brecker, George Young - tenor sax (13, 14)
- Lew Del Gatto - baritone sax (13, 14)
- Alan Rubin - trumpet (14)
- Dan Higgins, Gary Grant - horns (20)
- Paul McCartney - "kazoo" vocal solo (3)
- Charlie McCoy - harmonica (8)
- Pete Ham, Tom Evans - background vocals (2)
- Harry Nilsson - background vocals
- Madeline Bell, Lesley Duncan - background vocals (4)
- Martha Reeves, Merry Clayton and Friends - background vocals (6)
- The Jordanaires - background vocals (8)
- Clydie King - background vocals (10, 12)
- Linda Lawrence, Joe Greene - background vocals (10)
- The Blackberries, The Masst Alberts - background vocals (12)
- The Mad Mauries - background vocals (13), claps (13)
- Melissa Manchester, Duitsch Helmer, Joe Bean - background vocals (14)
- Andy Sturmer, Roger Manning - background vocals (15)
- Jack Nitzche - orchestra and chorus arrangement (1)
- Graham Preskett - string arrangements (16)
- Carl - "Weddings & Bar Mitzvah's" (12)

== Charts ==
Chart	Peak position
Japanese Albums (Oricon)	84
