= Ringo Starr: Live at Soundstage =

Live album by Ringo Starr
- Released: 23 October 2007
- Recorded: 24 June 2005
- Venue: Genesee Theatre (Waukegan, Illinois)
- Genre: Rock
- Length: 51:08
- Label: Koch
- Producer: Mark Hudson; Ringo Starr

Ringo Starr chronology
Photograph: The Very Best of Ringo Starr (2007)	Ringo Starr: Live at Soundstage (2007)	Liverpool 8 (2008)

Professional ratings
Review scores
Source	Rating
AllMusic	3/5 stars

Ringo Starr: Live at Soundstage is a 2007 live album by English rock drummer and singer Ringo Starr. It was recorded at the Genesee Theatre in Waukegan, Illinois on 24 June 2005 as part of the PBS concert series Soundstage. The Roundheads for this performance were: Steve Dudas (lead guitar), Gary Burr (guitar), Mark Hudson (guitar), Matt Bissonette (bass guitar), Mark Hart (keyboards) and Gregg Bissonette (drums). Colin Hay and his wife Cecilia Noël joined in on the "With a Little Help From My Friends" finale.

Ringo Starr: Live at Soundstage features many of Starr's best-known songs, both as a solo artist and as a member of the Beatles. The tracks include Yellow Submarine, Octopus's Garden, "Photograph" and songs from his two previous studio albums, Choose Love and Ringo Rama.

== Track listing ==
No.	Title	Writer(s)	Length
1.	"With a Little Help from My Friends / It Don't Come Easy"	John Lennon, Paul McCartney; Richard Starkey	4:00
2.	"Octopus's Garden"	Starkey	3:09
3.	"Choose Love"	Starkey, Mark Hudson, Gary Burr	3:30
4.	"I Wanna Be Your Man"	Lennon, McCartney	3:20
5.	"Don't Pass Me By"	Starkey	3:45
6.	"I'm the Greatest"	Lennon	3:06
7.	"Memphis in Your Mind"	Starkey, Hudson, Burr, Steve Dudas, Dean Grakal	3:19
8.	"Photograph"	Starkey, George Harrison	3:53
9.	"Never Without You"	Starkey, Hudson, Gary Nicholson	4:38
10.	"Back Off Boogaloo"	Starkey	3:58
11.	"Boys"	Luther Dixon, Wes Farrell	3:01
12.	"Yellow Submarine"	Lennon, McCartney	3:58
13.	"Act Naturally"	Johnny Russell, Voni Morrison	2:49
14.	"With a Little Help from My Friends"	Lennon, McCartney	4:42

== Live show setlist ==
1. "With a Little Help from My Friends" / "It Don't Come Easy" (Lennon/McCartney; Richard Starkey)
2. "Octopus's Garden" (Starkey)
3. "Choose Love" (Starkey, Hudson, Burr)
4. "I Wanna Be Your Man" (Lennon/McCartney)
5. "Down Under" (Colin Hay)
6. "Waiting for My Real Life to Begin" (Hay, feat. Cecilia Noël)
7. "Don't Pass Me By" (Starkey)
8. "I'm the Greatest" (John Lennon)
9. "Give Me Back the Beat" (Starkey, Hudson, Burr, Dudas, Grakal)
10. "Memphis in Your Mind" (Starkey, Hudson, Burr, Dudas, Grakal)
11. "Photograph" (Starkey, Harrison)
12. "Never Without You" (Starkey, Hudson, Nicholson)
13. "Back Off Boogaloo" (Starkey)
14. "Boys" (Dixon, Farrell)
15. "Who Can It Be Now?" (Hay)
16. "You Can't Do That" (Lennon/McCartney)
17. "Long Tall Sally/I'm Down/Oh! Darling" (Hudson)
18. "Yellow Submarine" (Lennon/McCartney)
19. "Act Naturally" (Russell, Morrison)
20. "With a Little Help from My Friends" (Lennon/McCartney) (feat. Hay and Noel)

== Personnel ==
- Ringo Starr - drums, percussion, vocals, producer
- Gary Burr - electric guitar, mandolin, backing vocals
- Mark Hudson - electric and acoustic guitar, harmonica, backing vocals, producer
- Steve Dudas : electric guitar
- Matt Bissonette - bass guitar, backing vocals
- Mark Hart - keyboards, backing vocals
- Gregg Bissonette - drums, backing vocals

with special guests:

- Colin Hay, Cecilia Noël - backing vocals on finale
