= Back Off Boogaloo =

1972 song by Ringo Starr

- UK picture sleeve

Single by Ringo Starr
- B-side: "Blindman"
- Released: 17 March 1972
- Recorded: September 1971
- Studio: Apple, London
- Genre: Rock, glam rock
- Length: 3:16
- Label: Apple
- Songwriters: Richard Starkey, George Harrison (credited since 2017)
- Producer: George Harrison

Ringo Starr singles chronology
"It Don't Come Easy" (1971)	"Back Off Boogaloo" (1972)	"Photograph" (1973)

Music video
- "Back Off Boogaloo" on YouTube

"Back Off Boogaloo" is a song by the English rock musician Ringo Starr that was released as a non-album single in March 1972. Starr's former Beatles bandmate George Harrison produced the recording and helped Starr write the song, although he remained uncredited as a co-writer until 2017. Recording took place in London shortly after the pair had appeared together at Harrison's Concert for Bangladesh shows in August 1971. The single was a follow-up to Starr's 1971 hit song "It Don't Come Easy" and continued his successful run as a solo artist. "Back Off Boogaloo" peaked at number 2 in Britain and Canada, and number 9 on America's Billboard Hot 100. It remains Starr's highest-charting single in the United Kingdom.

The title for the song was inspired by English singer-songwriter Marc Bolan. Several commentators have interpreted the lyrics as an attack on Paul McCartney, reflecting Starr's disdain for the music McCartney had made as a solo artist over the previous two years. "Back Off Boogaloo" demonstrates the influence of glam rock on Starr, who directed the documentary film Born to Boogie about Bolan's band T. Rex around this time. Described by one biographer as a "high-energy in-your-face rocker", the song features a prominent slide guitar part by Harrison and contributions from musicians Gary Wright and Klaus Voormann. Starr made a promotional film for the single in which he is followed around the grounds of John Lennon's Tittenhurst Park property by a Frankenstein-like monster. The single's B-side, "Blindman", was originally intended as the theme song to the 1971 film of the same name, a Spaghetti Western in which Starr had a starring role.

Starr re-recorded "Back Off Boogaloo" for both his 1981 album Stop and Smell the Roses and his 2017 album Give More Love. A collaboration with American singer Harry Nilsson, the 1981 version incorporates lyrics from Beatles songs such as "With a Little Help from My Friends", "Good Day Sunshine" and "Baby, You're a Rich Man". The original recording has appeared on Starr's compilation albums Blast from Your Past and Photograph: The Very Best of Ringo Starr, and as a bonus track on his remastered 1974 studio album Goodnight Vienna. After his return to touring in 1989, Starr performed "Back Off Boogaloo" regularly in concert with the various incarnations of his All-Starr Band.

== Background and inspiration ==
Ringo Starr identified his initial inspiration for "Back Off Boogaloo" as having come from Marc Bolan, the singer and guitarist with the English glam rock band T. Rex. In a 2001 interview with Mojo editor Paul Du Noyer, Starr described Bolan as "a dear friend who used to come into the office when I was running Apple Movies, a big office in town, and the hang-out for myself, Harry Nilsson and Keith Moon". Over dinner one evening at Starr's home outside London, in 1971, Bolan had used the word "boogaloo" so often that it stuck in Starr's mind, after which the beat and melody for the song came to him overnight. When discussing the composition on VH1 Storytellers in May 1998, Starr explained: "[Bolan] was an energised guy. He used to speak: 'Back off, boogaloo ... ooh you, boogaloo.' 'Do you want some potatoes?' 'Ooh you, boogaloo!'" Starr also recalled having to take the batteries out of his children's toys that night, in order to power a tape recorder and make a recording of the new song.

The lyrics to the middle eight of "Back Off Boogaloo" came to Starr while watching London Weekend Television's football show, The Big Match. The program's host, Jimmy Hill, often referred to a footballer's playing as "tasty", a catchphrase that Starr incorporated into his song lyrics.

According to Starr biographer Alan Clayson, "T Rex devotees" claimed that Bolan had ghost-written "Back Off Boogaloo". Starr later acknowledged that George Harrison co-wrote the song by adding some chords and finishing the melody. (Note: In a mid-1971 interview with Melody Maker, Starr described himself as "the king of the first verses". He said he typically took his song ideas to Harrison, "who puts in five more chords and you all say, 'God, look at that, see the way he [Starr] wrote that song with all those chords?' Ha, ha, ha.") As on Starr's 1971 hit single "It Don't Come Easy", Harrison was not credited for his songwriting contribution. Starr originally offered "Back Off Boogaloo" to his fellow Liverpudlian Cilla Black to record, but she declined, hoping instead to record another new Starr–Harrison composition, "Photograph". (Note: Harrison subsequently offered Black "When Every Song Is Sung" and produced her recording of the song in August 1972, with Starr playing drums on the session. Intended as a single, Black's version was never released, and Starr recorded the song, as "I'll Still Love You", for his 1976 album Ringo's Rotogravure.)

== Composition ==
Commentators have regularly interpreted the song as an attack by Starr on his former Beatles bandmate Paul McCartney. Starr denied any such interpretation, instead "claiming that the song was inspired by Bolan and nothing more", Beatles biographer Robert Rodriguez writes. The lyrics to the middle eight, especially, have been interpreted in this way:

Get yourself together now
And give me something tasty
Everything you try to do
You know it sure sounds wasted.

In author Andrew Grant Jackson's interpretation, Starr, having composed few songs in the past, was goading himself to "finally write a 'tasty' song", yet "at the same time, he was probably castigating McCartney". According to Jackson, this was reflective of the tensions between the pair since late in the Beatles' career, particularly after Starr visited McCartney in March 1970 to ask that he agree to delay the release of his debut solo album, McCartney, to avoid it clashing with that of the Beatles' Let It Be album. Starr had publicly criticised McCartney and its 1971 follow-up, Ram, and author Bruce Spizer paraphrases the message of the middle eight as "a plea for Paul to produce better music". (Note: Speaking to Melody Maker in July 1971, Starr said of McCartney's songwriting: "He disappoints me on his albums. I don't think there's one [good] tune on the last one ... It's like he's not admitting that he can write great tunes.") Rodriguez writes that the mention of "sound[ing] wasted" could also be a reference to McCartney's overindulgence with cannabis.

A further example of Starr's allegedly anti-McCartney message exists in the song's first verse:

Wake up, meathead
Don't pretend that you are dead
Get yourself up off the cart.

I was great at writing two verses and a chorus – I'm still pretty good at that. Finishing songs is not my forte … I started writing "Back Off Boogaloo," then took it to George to help finish off. Same with "Photograph" and "It Don't Come Easy."

— Starr to Time Out New York, July 2003, acknowledging Harrison's contribution to the song

The same commentators suggest that here Starr could be referring to the 1969 "Paul is dead" rumour. This rumour circulated during September and October of that year while McCartney hid away on his Scottish farm, disconsolate after John Lennon had told him and Starr that he wanted a "divorce" from the Beatles.

In addition to these supposed messages in "Back Off Boogaloo", observers have viewed the song title as Starr's rebuke to McCartney to abandon his legal stand against the Beatles and Apple Corps, which was placed in receivership in March 1971 after a High Court judge found in McCartney's favour. Author Keith Badman writes that "Boogaloo" had "long been cited as Paul's nickname" from his former bandmates Starr, Harrison and Lennon. While acknowledging that in subsequent years Starr might have chosen to minimise any ill-feeling towards McCartney, Rodriguez remarks that the lyrics "just happened to fit perfectly into the 'us vs. Paul' mindset" following the Beatles' break-up, to the extent that "Back Off Boogaloo" was "as damning as 'Early 1970' had been conciliatory". When tailoring his 1970 composition "I'm the Greatest" for Starr to record on the 1973 album Ringo, Lennon referenced the song title with the lines "Now I'm only thirty-two / And all I want to do is boogaloo".

== Recording ==
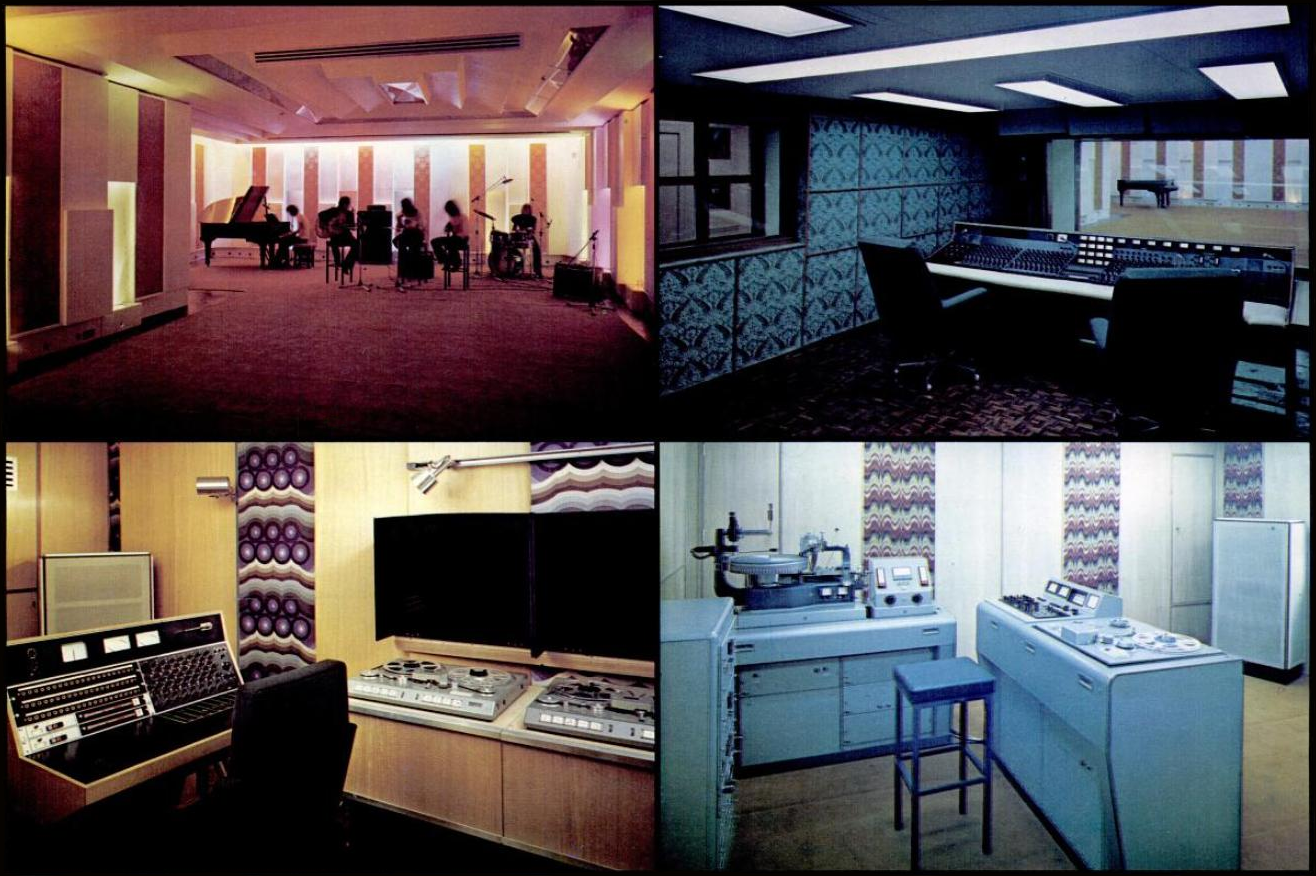
Photos of Apple Studio, taken in 1971

Having earmarked the song as his next single, Starr recorded "Back Off Boogaloo" in September 1971, following his appearance at the Harrison-organised Concert for Bangladesh in New York. The sessions took place at Apple Studio in central London, with Harrison producing, as he had on "It Don't Come Easy". The recording reflects the influence of glam rock on Starr through what authors Chip Madinger and Mark Easter term "its big drum sound and repetitious nature". The line-up comprised Starr (vocals, drums, percussion), Harrison (guitars), Gary Wright (piano) and Klaus Voormann (bass, saxophone).

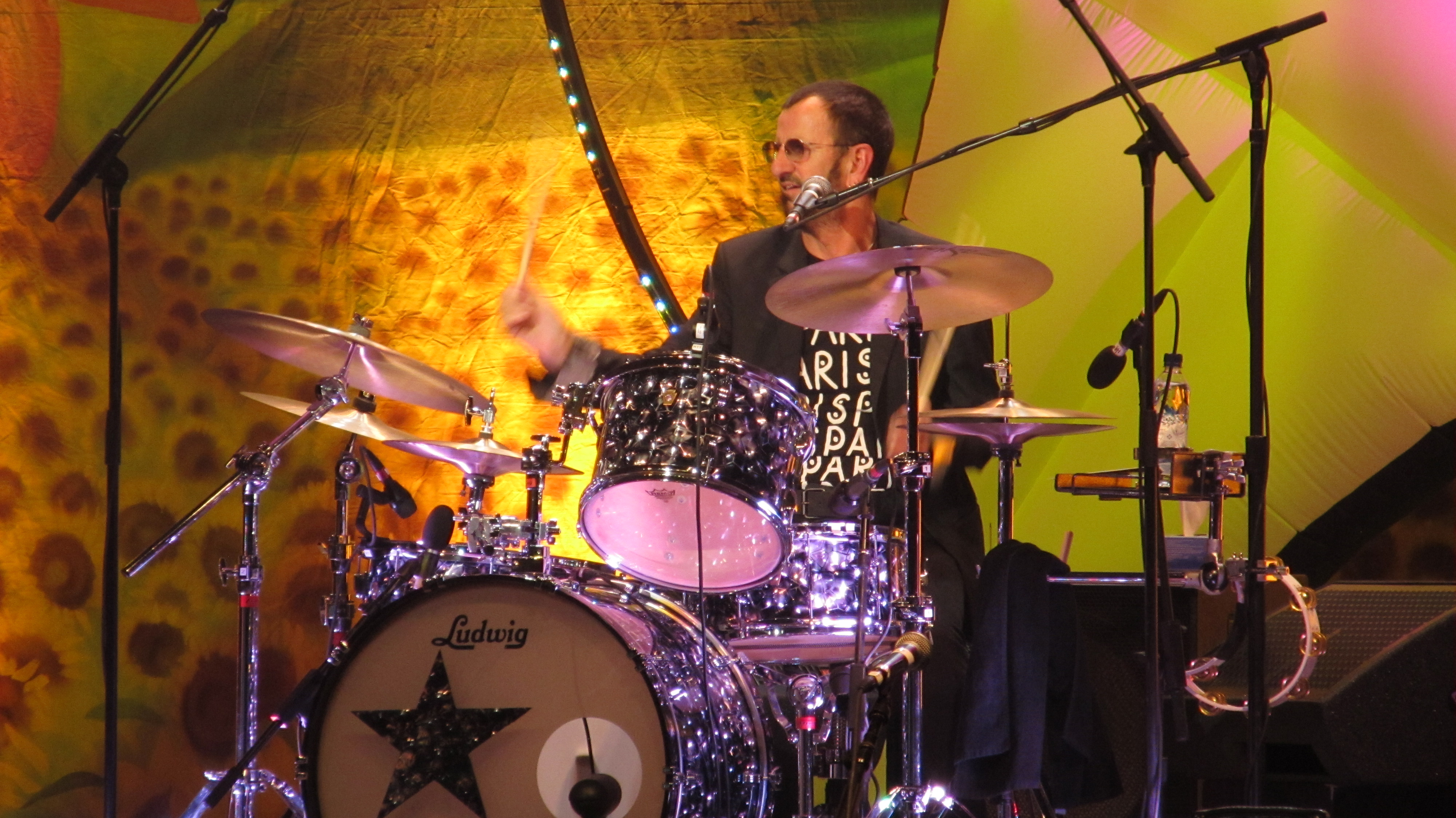
Starr performing with his All-Starr Band in 2011

Rodriguez describes Starr's "martial-sounding opening" as a rare "showcase for his own drumming", while Harrison biographer Simon Leng writes of "a roaring series of Harrison slide breaks that brought to mind Duane Allman". (Note: Jackson also recognises the slide guitar playing as Harrison "in Allman Brothers mode" and comments that the guitarist had added a similar contribution to Lennon's "anti-McCartney diatribe", "How Do You Sleep?", recorded earlier in 1971.) Starr later said that he incorporated a hook he had come up with for the Beatles song "Get Back" into his drum part on "Back Off Boogaloo". Further overdubs on the track included contributions from three backing vocalists, led by American soul singer Madeline Bell.

=== "Blindman" ===
For the single's B-side, Starr had already written and recorded "Blindman". It was intended to be the theme song for the Ferdinando Baldi-directed Spaghetti Western Blindman, filming for which Starr had interrupted in order to perform at the Concert for Bangladesh. The song was passed over for inclusion in the film, since producer Tony Anthony favoured an original score by Stelvio Cipriani.

Starr produced the track with Voormann. The recording sessions took place at Apple on 18–19 August, with Badfinger guitarist Pete Ham assisting Starr and Voormann. Like the film, "Blindman" was not held in high regard by critics. Spizer describes it as "a muddy-sounding dirge with little to recommend". By contrast, director and author Alex Cox believes that the song "works well, in the context of the film" compared to Cipriani's score, which he considers "lazy".

== Release ==
Apple Records issued the single on 17 March 1972 in Britain, as Apple R 5944, with a US release taking place three days later, as Apple 1849. It was Starr's first release since "It Don't Come Easy", a year before. During this period, his priority had been to develop a career as an actor in films such as 200 Motels and Blindman. Further aligning himself with Britain's glam rock movement, Starr made his directorial debut with Born to Boogie, a film starring Bolan that included Starr's footage of a T. Rex concert held at Wembley on 18 March 1972. (Note: Starr continued to pursue his acting career through to the end of 1972, with starring roles in Count Downe, released in 1974 as Son of Dracula, and That'll Be the Day.)

The song was a hit in the US, peaked at number 9 on the Billboard Hot 100, and achieved Starr's best position on the UK Singles Chart, where it reached number 2. A promotional film for "Back Off Boogaloo" was shot on 20 March at Lennon's Tittenhurst Park residence while Starr was looking after the property. The clip shows Starr walking around an outdoor structure and followed by a Frankenstein-like monster; it was directed by Tom Taylor and financed by Caravel Films. A similar-looking monster appeared on the single's picture sleeve, holding a cigarette. (Note: Spizer writes that Apple "couldn't resist making a pun" out of this image and took out a back-cover advertisement in Billboard magazine headed by the tagline "Another Monster from Apple".) Referring to the film clip, Jackson writes: "the Frankenstein monster stalks Starr but in the end the two hug and dance together, as thankfully, he and McCartney eventually did, leading to many more collaborations over the next forty years."

Re-releases for "Back Off Boogaloo" include Starr's 1975 greatest hits album, Blast from Your Past, and, along with "Blindman", as a bonus track on the 1992 reissue of his Goodnight Vienna album. "Back Off Boogaloo" also appeared on his 2007 compilation Photograph: The Very Best of Ringo Starr, the collector's edition of which included the 1972 promotional film.

== Critical reception ==
On release, Chris Welch wrote in Melody Maker: "A Number One hit could easily be in store for the maestro of rock drums. There's a touch of the Marc Bolans in this highly playable rhythmic excursion ... It's hypnotic and effective, ideal for jukeboxes and liable to send us all mad by the end of the week." Alan Clayson writes of reviewers criticising "Back Off Boogaloo" for being repetitious, leading Starr to respond in a 1973 interview: "Play me a pop song that isn't." Record World listed the song first in its "Hits of the Week" predictions and said: "It's taken Ringo a long time to follow up 'It Don't Come Easy,' but he's come up with one here that should do at least as well, and that means top three."

Writing in 1981, NME critic Bob Woffinden commented on Starr's success in establishing himself in the first two years after the Beatles' break-up, and said that the single "confirmed that he and Harrison, dark horses both, were the ones who had managed their solo careers more purposefully and intelligently" compared with McCartney and Lennon. Woffinden described "Back Off Boogaloo" as "every bit as ebullient" as "It Don't Come Easy", although "slightly inferior", while Mike DeGagne of AllMusic views it as a song where "[t]he jovial spirit of Ringo Starr shines through". In a 1974 article for the NME, Charles Shaar Murray highlighted "Back Off Boogaloo" as a "great radio and juke-box tune".

Among Beatle biographers, Simon Leng terms it "a rocking, soccer crowd chant that suited Starr's talents well", and Bruce Spizer praises the track as a "high-energy in-your-face rocker propelled by Ringo's thundering drums and George's stinging slide guitar". In the 2005 publication NME Originals: Beatles – The Solo Years 1970–1980, Paul Moody listed "Back Off Boogaloo" first among Starr's "ten solo gems" and described it as "Good time rock'n'droll to match the Faces". Guitar World editor Damian Fanelli includes the song on his list of Harrison's ten best post-Beatles "Guitar Moments", saying of the recording: "the main event is clearly Harrison's slightly wild, wacky – and very bouncy – slide guitar solo, which includes an alternate melody line that's even catchier than the melody Ringo is singing."

Andrew Grant Jackson features "Back Off Boogaloo" in his book Still the Greatest: The Essential Solo Beatles Songs. He says that Starr's mood on the track, while short of the rage that American rapper Tupac Shakur vented against his rival Biggie Smalls in "Hit 'Em Up", "no doubt helped make the tune a staple of football and soccer matches". He comments that the song has "been appropriated" by several artists, including the glam-metal band Warrant, in their hit single "Cherry Pie", and Franz Ferdinand, in "Take Me Out".

== Subsequent recordings ==
=== Stop and Smell the Roses version ===
"Back Off Boogaloo"

Song by Ringo Starr

from the album Stop and Smell the Roses
- Published: Startling Music
- Released: 27 October 1981
- Genre: Rock, funk
- Length: 3:28
- Label: Boardwalk
- Songwriter: Richard Starkey
- Producer: Harry Nilsson

Starr recorded a new version of "Back Off Boogaloo" for his 1981 album on Boardwalk Records, Stop and Smell the Roses. The song was produced by Starr's friend, singer Harry Nilsson, and features a musical arrangement by Van Dyke Parks. Similar to Nilsson's 1968 cover of the Beatles' "You Can't Do That", the remake incorporates lyrics from a number of the band's songs – in this case, "With a Little Help from My Friends", "Help!", "Lady Madonna", "Good Day Sunshine" and "Baby, You're a Rich Man", as well as Starr's "It Don't Come Easy". In a further reference to his past, the 1981 version of "Back Off Boogaloo" opens with the same guitar riff that Harrison had played on "It Don't Come Easy" ten years before. (Note: Starr had similarly combined "Back Off Boogaloo" in a medley for his 1978 TV special Ringo, which featured Harrison in the role of narrator. Arranged in the easy listening style by Jimmy Webb, the show's musical director, this instrumental piece also included "Oh My My" and "It Don't Come Easy".)

Starr taped the basic track at Evergreen Recording Studios in Los Angeles on 4 November 1980, with additional recording taking place on 1–5 December at Nassau's Compass Point Studios. Among the large cast of musicians supporting Starr were Nilsson (vocals), Jim Keltner (drums), Jane Getz (piano), Dennis Budimir and Richie Zito (guitars), and a four-piece horn section led by saxophonist Jerry Jumonville.

Starr overdubbed his vocals on 4 December, four days before the murder of John Lennon, who had been due to record his contributions to Stop and Smell the Roses in January 1981. Contrasting with his success as a solo artist in 1971–73, the album continued Starr's run of commercial and critical failures since 1976. Rodriguez writes that "[m]ost people either love or hate the revamping" of "Back Off Boogaloo".

=== Give More Love version ===
Starr released another re-recording of "Back Off Boogaloo" as one of the four bonus tracks on the CD and digital versions of his 2017 album Give More Love. Produced by Starr, the recording is based on his original 1971 demo of the song, which he rediscovered when he and his wife, Barbara Bach, were moving house. Starr recalled his surprise at hearing the tape again: "It's me singing 'Back Off Boogaloo' with this great guitar. I'm thinking who the hell is that playing? Then I realise, I'm on guitar! ... the reel-to-reel captures the song coming [through]." The track includes guitar overdubs by Jeff Lynne and Joe Walsh. On this album, the song's authorship is credited to Richard Starkey and George Harrison.

== Live performance ==
Starr has performed "Back Off Boogaloo" in concert with his All-Starr Band, beginning with the band's debut tour of North America in July–September 1989. The song was dropped from the concert setlist early in that tour, however, in favour of the 1963 Lennon–McCartney composition "I Wanna Be Your Man". Live versions of "Back Off Boogaloo" have appeared on the multi-disc compilation The Anthology... So Far (2001) and King Biscuit Flower Hour Presents Ringo & His New All-Starr Band (2002). The latter version was recorded during a US tour in August 2001, at which point the All-Starr line-up was Starr (vocals), Mark Rivera (saxophone), Ian Hunter (guitar), Roger Hodgson and Howard Jones (keyboards), Greg Lake (bass) and Sheila E. (drums).

Starr also played the song live with "Ringo and the Roundheads", a band he formed to promote his 1998 studio album Vertical Man. A version recorded on 13 May that year at Sony Music Studios, New York, appeared on Starr's VH1 Storytellers live album and video, released in October 1998. The personnel on this performance included Starr (vocals), Walsh and Mark Hudson (guitars), Jack Blades (bass) and Simon Kirke (drums). Another live version with the Roundheads, recorded for PBS Television's Soundstage in August 2005, was issued on the album Ringo Starr: Live at Soundstage (2007) and on DVD in 2009.

== Personnel ==
The following musicians played on the original version of "Back Off Boogaloo":

- Ringo Starr – vocals, drums, percussion, backing vocals
- George Harrison – slide guitars, acoustic guitar
- Gary Wright – piano
- Klaus Voormann – bass, saxophone
- Madeline Bell, Lesley Duncan, Jean Gilbert – backing vocals

== Chart performance ==
=== Weekly singles charts ===
Chart (1972)	Peak position
Australian Go-Set National Top 40	11
Australian Kent Music Report	14
Belgian Ultratop Singles	23
Canadian RPM 100	2
Dutch MegaChart Singles	7
Irish Singles Chart	12
Japanese Oricon Singles Chart	58
New Zealand Listener Chart	19
Swiss Singles Chart	8
UK Singles Chart	2
US Billboard Hot 100	9
US Cash Box Top 100	10
West German Media Control Singles	12

=== Year-end charts ===
Chart (1972)	Rank
US Cash Box Singles	88

== Sources ==
- Badman, Keith (2001). The Beatles Diary Volume 2: After the Break-Up 1970–2001. London: Omnibus Press. ISBN 978-0-7119-8307-6.
- The Beatles (2000). The Beatles Anthology. San Francisco, CA: Chronicle Books. ISBN 0-8118-2684-8.
- Castleman, Harry; Podrazik, Walter J. (1976). All Together Now: The First Complete Beatles Discography 1961–1975. New York, NY: Ballantine Books. ISBN 0-345-25680-8.
- Clayson, Alan (2003). Ringo Starr. London: Sanctuary. ISBN 1-86074-488-5.
- Cox, Alex (2009). 10,000 Ways to Die: A Director's Take on the Spaghetti Western. Harpenden, UK: Oldcastle Books. ISBN 978-1-84243-304-1.
- Doggett, Peter (2011). You Never Give Me Your Money: The Beatles After the Breakup. New York, NY: It Books. ISBN 978-0-06-177418-8.
- Du Noyer, Paul (July 2001). "Champagne Supernova". Mojo. pp. 48–54.
- Harry, Bill (2004). The Ringo Starr Encyclopedia. London: Virgin Books. ISBN 978-0-7535-0843-5.
- Hunt, Chris, ed. (2005). NME Originals: Beatles – The Solo Years 1970–1980. London: IPC Ignite!.
- Ingham, Chris (2006). The Rough Guide to the Beatles (2nd edn). London: Rough Guides/Penguin. ISBN 978-1-84836-525-4.
- Jackson, Andrew Grant (2012). Still the Greatest: The Essential Solo Beatles Songs. Lanham, MD: Scarecrow Press. ISBN 978-0-8108-8222-5.
- Leng, Simon (2006). While My Guitar Gently Weeps: The Music of George Harrison. Milwaukee, WI: Hal Leonard. ISBN 978-1-4234-0609-9.
- Madinger, Chip; Easter, Mark (2000). Eight Arms to Hold You: The Solo Beatles Compendium. Chesterfield, MO: 44.1 Productions. ISBN 0-615-11724-4.
- Matovina, Dan (2000). Without You: The Tragic Story of Badfinger. Frances Glover Books. ISBN 0-9657122-2-2.
- Rodriguez, Robert (2010). Fab Four FAQ 2.0: The Beatles' Solo Years, 1970–1980. Milwaukee, WI: Backbeat Books. ISBN 978-1-4165-9093-4.
- Schaffner, Nicholas (1978). The Beatles Forever. New York, NY: McGraw-Hill. ISBN 0-07-055087-5.
- Sounes, Howard (2010). Fab: An Intimate Life of Paul McCartney. London: HarperCollins. ISBN 978-0-00-723705-0.
- Spizer, Bruce (2005). The Beatles Solo on Apple Records. New Orleans, LA: 498 Productions. ISBN 0-9662649-5-9.
- Tillery, Gary (2011). Working Class Mystic: A Spiritual Biography of George Harrison. Wheaton, IL: Quest Books. ISBN 978-0-8356-0900-5.
- Woffinden, Bob (1981). The Beatles Apart. London: Proteus. ISBN 0-906071-89-5.
