= Four Knights =

Four Knights may refer to:

- Four Knights Game, a chess opening
- The Four Knights, an American doo wop group
- Four Nights in Knaresborough, a play by Paul Corcoran (Paul Webb)
- The working title for the 1971 song, "Early 1970" by Ringo Starr
- The Four Horsemen of the Apocalypse
- The current 4 autonomous okrugs of Russia:
  - Chukotka Autonomous Okrug
  - Khanty-Mansi Autonomous Okrug
  - Nenets Autonomous Okrug
  - Yamalo-Nenets Autonomous Okrug
- The countries of the United Kingdom:
  - England
  - Scotland
  - Wales
  - Northern Ireland
- The provinces of Ireland:
  - Leinster
  - Connacht
  - Munster
  - Ulster
- The Turkic-speaking states of Central Asia:
  - Kazakhstan
  - Kyrgyzstan
  - Turkmenistan
  - Uzbekistan
