= Blast from Your Past =

Compilation album by Ringo Starr
- Released: 20 November 1975
- Recorded: 1970–1974
- Genre: Rock
- Length: 31:51
- Label: Apple
- Producers: Richard Perry; George Harrison; Pete Drake; Ringo Starr

Ringo Starr chronology
Goodnight Vienna (1974)	Blast from Your Past (1975)	Ringo's Rotogravure (1976)

Singles from Blast from Your Past
- 1. "Oh My My" Released: 9 January 1976

Professional ratings
Review scores
Source	Rating
AllMusic	4.5/5 stars
Christgau's Record Guide	B+
Encyclopedia of Popular Music	3/5 stars
The Essential Rock Discography	6/10
MusicHound	3/5
The Rolling Stone Album Guide	3/5 stars

Blast from Your Past is a compilation album by the English rock musician Ringo Starr, released on Apple Records in 1975. It is both Starr's first compilation LP and his final release under his contract with EMI. It was also the last album to be released on the Beatles' Apple label until it was revived in the 1990s.

The album provides an overview of Starr's most successful period as a solo artist. The songs include his RIAA gold-certified singles "It Don't Come Easy", "Photograph" and "You're Sixteen", and other international hits such as "Back Off Boogaloo" and "Only You". The album peaked at number 30 on the US Billboard pop LPs chart but failed to chart in the UK.

== Content ==
Blast from Your Past provides an overview of Starr's musical achievements as a solo artist during the first half of the 1970s. The album compiles eight singles, one B-side, and one album track, all released between 1970 and 1975. All eight of the singles charted on the Billboard Hot 100 in the US; "Photograph" and "You're Sixteen" each hit number 1, while all of them but "Beaucoups of Blues" made the top ten. Five of the songs charted in the United Kingdom, where the non-album single "Back Off Boogaloo" was the highest placed, at number 2. "Early 1970" was the B-side to "It Don't Come Easy", another non-album single, and "I'm the Greatest" was taken from the album Ringo. "Oh My My", "Photograph" and "You're Sixteen" were taken from Ringo also, and "No No Song" and "Only You (And You Alone)" first appeared on Goodnight Vienna.

== Release and reception ==
The album was released in the US on 20 November 1975, (Note: US Apple SW 3422) and 12 December in the UK. (Note: UK Apple PCS 7170) The latter was issued with a red Apple label. The sleeve for the album was designed by Roy Kohara. In the UK, Apple issued "Oh My My", backed with "No No Song", as a single on 9 January 1976, to promote the compilation and also because both of the songs had appeared there only as album tracks. As with John Lennon's recently released Apple compilation, Shaved Fish, the sales of Blast from Your Past were disappointing. The album failed to chart in the UK and peaked at number 30 in the US.

In his review for the NME, Bob Woffinden wrote that few observers would have expected Starr to have amassed enough hit songs for a greatest hits set five years after the Beatles' break-up, given that he had sung and written little during the band's career. Woffinden criticised the brevity of the album, however, and said that, since only four of the tracks had been significant chart successes in the UK, and many of the songs had not been issued as singles there, "why should [Starr] now consider an album of American 45s a going proposition in Britain?" Writing in their book The Beatles: An Illustrated Record, Roy Carr and Tony Tyler also commented on its "short weight" nature, saying: "the tracks total no more than half-an-hour. Both sides together, that is."

Blast from Your Past was reissued in the US by Capitol Records in September 1981, while in the UK it was released by the budget label Music for Pleasure on 25 November 1981. The album was issued on compact disc in the UK on 26 May 1987 and in the US on 18 January 1988.

All the tracks from Blast from Your Past appear on Starr's 2007 career-spanning compilation album Photograph: The Very Best of Ringo Starr.

== Track listing ==
Side one
No.	Title	Writer(s)	Original release	Length
1.	"You're Sixteen (You're Beautiful and You're Mine)"	Bob Sherman, Richard Sherman	Ringo, 1973	2:47
2.	"No No Song"	Hoyt Axton, David Jackson	Goodnight Vienna, 1974	2:29
3.	"It Don't Come Easy"	Richard Starkey	single, 1971	3:02
4.	"Photograph"	Starkey, George Harrison	Ringo	3:55
5.	"Back Off Boogaloo"	Starkey	single, 1972	3:18

Side two
No.	Title	Writer(s)	Original Album	Length
1.	"Only You (And You Alone)"	Buck Ram	Goodnight Vienna	3:23
2.	"Beaucoups of Blues"	Buzz Rabin	Beaucoups of Blues, 1970	2:32
3.	"Oh My My"	Starkey, Vini Poncia	Ringo	4:17
4.	"Early 1970"	Starkey	B-side of "It Don't Come Easy", 1971	2:19
5.	"I'm the Greatest"	John Lennon	Ringo	3:22

== Charts ==
Chart (1975/76)	Position
Australian Kent Music Report	95
US Billboard 200	30

== See also ==
- Shaved Fish
- The Best of George Harrison
- Wings Greatest
