= It Don't Come Easy =

- UK picture sleeve

Single by Ringo Starr
- B-side: "Early 1970"
- Released: 9 April 1971
- Recorded: March and October 1970
- Studio: Trident, London
- Genre: Rock
- Length: 3:00
- Label: Apple
- Songwriter: Richard Starkey
- Producer: George Harrison

Ringo Starr singles chronology
"Beaucoups of Blues" (1970)	"It Don't Come Easy" (1971)	"Back Off Boogaloo" (1972)

"It Don't Come Easy" is a song by the English rock musician Ringo Starr that was released as a non-album single in April 1971. It was produced by Starr's former Beatles bandmate George Harrison, who also helped write the song, although only Starr is credited. Recording for the track took place in March 1970 at Trident Studios in London, with overdubs added in October. Starr and Harrison performed the song together in August 1971 at Harrison's Concert for Bangladesh shows in New York City, a recording from which was released on the live album of the same name. Starr has continued to perform it in subsequent decades with his All-Starr Band.

Apart from in North America, where "Beaucoups of Blues" had been a single in October 1970, "It Don't Come Easy" was Starr's first single release since the break-up of the Beatles. Heavily promoted by Apple Records, the song was a commercial success, peaking at number 1 in Canada and number 4 on singles charts in the UK and the US. It was critically well received on release and remains one of his most popular hits as a solo artist.

== Background and composition ==
Ringo Starr began writing "It Don't Come Easy" in late 1968, having recently completed his first composition, "Don't Pass Me By". When referring to his early songwriting efforts in a 2003 interview, he described himself as "great at writing two verses and a chorus" but often unable to develop the ideas further. Although Starr received sole writing credit for "It Don't Come Easy", Beatles historian Bruce Spizer writes that he had "substantial, but uncredited, assistance" from his bandmate George Harrison. In author Robert Rodriguez's description, the official songwriting credit was long thought to be "bogus" and, notwithstanding Starr's involvement, a sign of Harrison's "great generosity" in wanting to help the drummer establish himself independently of the Beatles.

The song's original title was "You Gotta Pay Your Dues". Starr completed it as the Beatles were heading towards disbandment in early 1970, following John Lennon's unpublicised decision to leave the group in September 1969. Starr said that in trying to find a song that would establish his identity at this time, he had to "combat ... the original image of me as the downtrodden drummer", adding, "You don't know how hard it is to fight that." In journalist Bob Woffinden's view, as "It Don't Come Easy", the title alone "[betrayed] a wealth of information" about Starr's feelings of vulnerability while the other Beatles, as proven songwriters, could each look to further their achievements outside the band. (Note: According to Woffinden, the song's message reflects the pressure Starr felt "to deliver something of his own, and ... the fact that he didn't feel himself naturally up to the task".)

In its completed form, the song opens and closes with a lead guitar riff. Music historian Andrew Grant Jackson describes the lyrics as "Starr's exhortation to stay resilient in the face of hardship", and he views the reference to paying "your dues" as an apt image, given Starr's health issues as a child and limited education. In Rodriguez's view, the song was most likely inspired by "a Ringo-ism or two", but the guitar riff, "quasi-philosophical" lyrics and other musical details make it a typical Harrison composition from the period.

Starr subsequently acknowledged that Harrison helped write "It Don't Come Easy". (Note: In a mid-1971 interview with Melody Maker, Starr said he typically took his song ideas to Harrison, "who puts in five more chords and you all say, 'God, look at that, see the way he [Starr] wrote that song with all those chords?' Ha, ha, ha.") He discussed the song's creation during his appearance on VH1 Storytellers in 1998. Starr said: "I wrote this song with the one and only George Harrison." He went on to say that Harrison suggested the last verse be about God. When Starr protested, Harrison suggested Hare Krishna. Starr protested again, and Harrison suggested "peace" as a topic, and they settled on that.

== Recording history ==
=== Early takes ===
Starr first recorded the new composition during the sessions for Sentimental Journey which was an album of pre-rock 'n' roll standards that he undertook to keep active following Lennon's departure, and to please his mother. Recording for the song began during an all-night session on 18 February 1970 at EMI Studios (now Abbey Road Studios), with George Martin producing. The studio log listed the track as "You Gotta Pay Your Dues". Harrison played acoustic guitar and directed the other musicians – namely Starr (on drums), Klaus Voormann (bass) and Stephen Stills (piano). (Note: Around this time, Stills collaborated with Starr and Harrison on Doris Troy's self-titled album for Apple Records, and Starr played drums on his 1970 album Stephen Stills.) They taped 20 takes of the basic track. Starr added a vocal to the take selected as best and Harrison two electric guitar parts, and by 4.40am the recording had been mixed.

On 19 February, after final overdubs were carried out on "Love Is a Many-Splendored Thing" during an afternoon session at EMI, recording resumed on "You Gotta Pay Your Dues", with Starr adding another lead vocal. Harrison was not present that evening, although Eric Clapton may have been involved. During the session, Starr decided to remake the song; ten further takes were required to achieve a new basic track. Take 30 was labelled "best" and onto this take were added two bass parts. This version was also discarded, however, since Starr again decided to remake the song.

=== Official version ===
==== March 1970 recording ====
Recording for the third version of "It Don't Come Easy" began at Trident Studios on 8 March 1970, two days after Starr had completed work on Sentimental Journey. Harrison produced the sessions and played guitar. According to author Bill Harry, Voormann and Stills again contributed on bass and piano, while the other participants included Mal Evans (on tambourine) and Ron Cattermole (saxophone, trumpet). Overdubs were added to the new basic track on 11 March, again at Trident.

When news of the sessions reached the press that month, Apple insisted that there were "absolutely no plans for the record to be released as a single at the present time". Following the Beatles' break-up in April, Starr played drums on Harrison's All Things Must Pass album, a project that led to Starr recording a country album, Beaucoups of Blues, in Nashville. Despite these and other musical activities, Starr admitted to feeling "absolutely lost" with regard to his future outside the Beatles. According to Mike Gibbins of the Apple band Badfinger, Harrison offered "It Don't Come Easy" to Badfinger, but they did not take up the offer.

==== October 1970 overdubs ====
Work on the song resumed in October 1970, when Starr was otherwise contributing to Lennon's Plastic Ono Band album and Harrison was completing All Things Must Pass. Starr recorded his lead vocal at this time. Former Trident engineer Ken Scott recalls that Harrison first sang a guide vocal to help Starr with the phrasing. Other overdubs included backing vocals by Badfinger's Pete Ham and Tom Evans, and a new piano part, played by Gary Wright. Also added in October was a horn section, which, further to Harrison's use of horns on the Beatles' 1968 track "Savoy Truffle", was a staple of his 1970s productions. (Note: In his description of the recording, Scott does not name any of the horn players. Rather than Wright, he recalls Leon Russell as the pianist on "It Don't Come Easy" and includes Troy among the backing singers.) Another familiar Harrison device was the Leslie speaker effect on his lead guitar part, particularly in the song's intro.

In a 2002 interview, Jim Keltner said he added maracas to the finished recording, at Trident, having arrived in London in February 1971 to escape the Los Angeles earthquake. Referring to the arrangement on the completed track, author Alan Clayson highlights the combination of an opening "fizz of cymbal", Harrison's "clanging guitar arpeggios", the "fat gusto" horns, Evans' tambourine supporting the "moderato punch" of the Starr–Voormann rhythm section, and "gospel-esque" backing vocals.

An early mix from the sessions has appeared on bootlegs, featuring Harrison on lead vocal. While the instrumentation is almost identical to the released version, during the guitar break Ham and Tom Evans shout the line "Hare Krishna!" This was retained in the official release, but buried in the mix. Following the guitar solo, there is a repeat of the song's opening guitar phrase, although this section was subsequently edited out.

== Release and reception ==
Apple Records issued "It Don't Come Easy", backed with "Early 1970", as a single on 9 April 1971 in the United Kingdom, with the catalogue number Apple R5898. It was released on 16 April in the United States as Apple 1831. After Starr's forays into standards and country music with his two 1970 albums, it was his first rock record as a solo artist. Although "Beaucoups of Blues" had been issued as a single in the US and some other markets, "It Don't Come Easy" was Starr's debut single in the UK and most other countries.

The NME's Alan Smith described the song as "undoubtedly one of the best, thumpin'est things the Starr man has ever done", with a "very strong hook" and, thanks to Harrison, a "fat, pumping backing full of guts and stuff". Smith was critical of Starr's vocal, but concluded: "on the credit side we have an inventive mind and a dry wit coming more and more into play with better songs. One day he may even write a masterpiece." Billboard's reviewer admired the single as Starr's "most commercial solo effort" yet and said that "Potent Top 40 rock material and vocal workout has it to take him all the way." Cash Box described the song as "stunning and delightful". Record World said that Starr "has found his groove with this one." Peter Jones of Record Mirror praised the guitars and drums, and predicted an "easy" top-five hit. He wrote that "At first hearing, it didn't mean much – but it has a built-in grow-on-you appeal."

The single was heavily promoted by Apple. It peaked at number 4 on the UK Singles Chart and number 5 on Melody Maker's national chart. In the US, the song reached number 4 on the Billboard Hot 100 and topped the charts compiled by Cash Box (for one week) and Record World. It was also number 1 on the RPM 100 in Canada and a top-five hit in many other countries around the world. Starr's single outsold those released by his former bandmates around this time: Lennon's "Power to the People", Paul McCartney's "Another Day" and Harrison's "Bangla Desh". Fans' attention was also drawn to the B-side, to which Lennon and Harrison had contributed, as Starr offered his view of how likely each of the other ex-Beatles was to make music with him again. The single was certified gold by the Recording Industry Association of America on 3 August, signifying US sales of 1 million.

The assuredness and commercial success of "It Don't Come Easy" came as a surprise to commentators who had written off Starr's potential as a solo artist. (Note: Writing later in the 1970s, NME critics Roy Carr and Tony Tyler commented on the irony that Starr's debut single was so convincing whereas McCartney's was full of bourgeois sentiments and "disappointingly mediocre".) Author Peter Doggett writes that with Harrison's "My Sweet Lord" easily outselling any of the former bandmates' singles in the year after their break-up, Starr's achievement was similarly part of a "decisive shift in power" and encouraged speculation that competition between the four solo artists could inspire "the quartet to new creative heights". In an interview with Melody Maker that summer, Starr said he hoped to record a full album in the "poppy" style of "It Don't Come Easy" once he had completed filming his role in the Spaghetti Western Blindman. Although he recorded a follow-up single with Harrison, "Back Off Boogaloo", Starr avoided committing to a new album project for two years, and instead took on further film roles. (Note: According to Bob Woffinden, this was in reaction to the commercial failure of Beaucoups of Blues in late 1970, which itself was caused by the public's disappointment at Starr's "grievous faux pas", Sentimental Journey.)

The 22 April 1971 edition of the BBC TV show Top of the Pops showed the promotional film for the song, prepared by Apple. On 27 April, Starr was in Norway to shoot another promo clip for "It Don't Come Easy", which was broadcast two days later on Top of the Pops. (Note: Aired just once in the 1970s, this version was repeated on 2 August 1993, as part of Top of the Pops re-showings.) Starr was filmed performing the song live in Stockholm on 24 June backed by an orchestra, for the BBC TV show Cilla, which aired on 27 November. Further to his breakthrough as a solo artist, Starr's public profile was lifted by the formation of the first fan club devoted to him, and he was voted Top Drummer in the NME readers' poll for 1971.

== Performance at the Concert for Bangladesh ==
[Starr's] appearance also rekindled the past. Shaking his head to the rhythm as he had in 1964, he seemed like a living incarnation of the Beatles of old, spreading their ageless magic throughout the hall.

— Author Peter Doggett

Backed by Harrison and a large band that included Voormann, Keltner and Badfinger, Starr performed "It Don't Come Easy" as his vocal turn at the two Concert for Bangladesh shows, held at Madison Square Garden in New York on 1 August 1971. Starr had been among the first musicians to respond when Harrison began organising the event, and extricated himself from his filming commitments in Spain for Blindman. The shows marked the first time that two Beatles had shared a concert stage in the US since the band quit touring in August 1966, and they were also Starr's first public concert performances since that time. Starr forgot some of the words to the song during the first show. According to Beatles biographer Nicholas Schaffner, he nevertheless "received the show's biggest ovation" for his turn in the spotlight. (Note: Starr had the lyrics written out and fixed to his drum kit, but he was unable to read them under the concert lighting. Rodriguez writes that the 1972 concert film The Concert for Bangladesh shows Starr "visibly touched" by the audience's response, which was further to their emotion at seeing him and Harrison on stage again.)

Starr's presence was one of the main points of media attention at the Concert for Bangladesh.

The evening performance of "It Don't Come Easy" was included on the Concert for Bangladesh triple album and in the 1972 Apple Films documentary film of the same name. A Rolling Stone writer commented that "Seeing Ringo Starr drumming and singing on stage has a joy in it that is one of the happiest feelings on earth still." In his album review for the same publication, Jon Landau approved of the decision to retain Starr's live vocal, saying that his idiosyncratic delivery and "tremendous good-nature and humor" added to the authenticity of the concert.

Writing in The Village Voice soon after attending the event, critic Robert Christgau conceded his favouritism towards Starr when ruing how Harrison, at the front of the stage, blocked his view of the drummer dressed in "grand ole black-on-black" as he sang "It Don't Come Easy". Christgau described Starr's demeanour during the performance as "brimming with quiet happiness, as if after eight years he still couldn't quite believe his own good fortune"; he cited this deferential quality as the reason why "unlike the others he remains immune to the vagaries of our affection. Ringo is our representative on the Beatles." (Note: Christgau also said the pairing of "It Don't Come Easy" and "Early 1970" was "the best single any ex-Beatle has released".)

== Subsequent releases and other live versions ==
The studio version of the song remained unavailable on an LP until the release of Starr's 1975 Apple greatest hits compilation, Blast from Your Past. It was also heard in the 1978 NBC-TV special Ringo. Although Starr recorded new versions of several songs for the special, the released recording of "It Don't Come Easy" was used.

According to author Andrew Grant Jackson, "It Don't Come Easy" became the artist's "signature single"; Nick DeRiso of Ultimate Classic Rock describes it as "a kind of theme song for Starr". Starr's re-recording of "Back Off Boogaloo" for his 1981 album Stop and Smell the Roses references the song, along with several Beatles tracks, by reprising Harrison's opening guitar riff. On 12 March 1984, EMI released a UK single pairing "It Don't Come Easy" and "Back Off Boogaloo" as part of the company's Golden 45s series.

Starr has frequently performed "It Don't Come Easy" in concert with his All-Starr Band. He included it in the set list for his July–September 1989 American tour, and a performance of the song opens the 1990 album Ringo Starr and His All-Starr Band and the 2001 live compilation The Anthology... So Far. It was also included on a bonus 5-inch CD single issued with the US limited edition deluxe CD version of Ringo Starr and His All-Starr Band. Recorded at The Bottom Line in New York in May 1998, his live version for VH1 Storytellers appeared on the album and video releases from the programme.

In 1991, "It Don't Come Easy" was added as a bonus track on the CD version of Ringo, along with "Early 1970" and "Down and Out". Starr's song "Don't Go Where the Road Don't Go", from his 1992 album Time Takes Time, includes an homage to the song during the bridge with the line, "Well I said it don't come easy, well I sure know how it feels". Similarly, his song "Eye to Eye", from his 2003 album Ringo Rama, starts with the lines, "Remember when I said it don't come easy / That seems so long ago".

== Covers and appearances ==
The song was the opening theme of the 1973–1975 ABC late night talk show Good Night, America hosted by Geraldo Rivera.

In 1987, a cover version of "It Don't Come Easy" was used in a commercial for 7-Eleven using the slogan "Where the good things come easy".

In 1991, along with a guest appearance by Starr, the song was featured in The Simpsons episode "Brush with Greatness". The song is used as inspirational background music for a montage of Marge Simpson painting a portrait of Mr. Burns.

On her 2010 release Interpretations: The British Rock Songbook, Bettye LaVette included a slowed down bluesy version of the song.

The song was covered by the American band the Smithereens on their album of rarities, Attack of the Smithereens. A cover is featured in the 2014 film The Identical.

Neal Morse, Mike Portnoy, and Randy George (as Morse/Portnoy/George) released this as their second single from their 2020 covers album Cov3r to Cov3r on 19 June 2020.

In 2020, Peter Frampton covered it to celebrate Starr's 80th birthday.

== Personnel ==
According to Bruce Spizer, the following musicians played on the released version of "It Don't Come Easy":

- Ringo Starr – vocals, drums, maracas
- George Harrison – guitars
- Gary Wright – piano
- Klaus Voormann – bass
- unknown session musicians – horns
- Mal Evans – tambourine
- Jim Keltner - maracas
- Pete Ham, Tom Evans – backing vocals
- Ken Scott - engineer

== Chart performance ==
=== Weekly charts ===
Chart (1971)	Peak position
Australian Go-Set National Top 60	3
Australian Kent Music Report	3
Austria	3
Belgian Ultratop Singles	9
Canadian RPM 100	1
Dutch MegaChart Singles	7
Irish Singles Chart	4
Japanese Oricon Singles	30
New Zealand NZ Listener Chart	7
Norwegian VG-lista Singles	5
South African Springbok Singles Chart	4
Swedish Kvällstoppen Chart	14
Swiss Singles Chart	5
UK Singles Chart	4
US Billboard Hot 100	4
US Billboard Easy Listening	24
US Cash Box Top 100 Singles	1
US Record World Singles Chart	1
West German Media Control Singles	5

=== Year-end charts ===
Chart (1971)	Rank
Canadian RPM Singles	9
US Billboard	43
US Cash Box	25
