= Perry D. Cox =

Pop & rock memorabilia expert

Perry Duane Cox (born September 3, 1957, Tempe, Arizona) is a pop & rock memorabilia expert and author specializing in the Beatles and the Beach Boys. He is best known for his price and reference guide books on The Beatles and The Beach Boys records and collectibles which have become the standard resource in the collector world. Mr. Cox is highly regarded by his fellow authors and collectors and is recognized as a leading expert in the area of counterfeit identification as well.

== Works ==
(1983) The Complete Beatles U.S. Record Price Guide (by Perry Cox and Joe Lindsay) Pub. O'Sullivan-Woodside ISBN 0-89019-082-8. The first edition of his Beatles price guide was the first such guide ever devoted to the Beatles.

(1986) The Beatles Price And Reference Guide For American Records (By Perry Cox and Mike Miller) Pub. Cox-Miller Ltd. ISBN 0-9617-244-0-4

(1988) The Official Price Guide To Memorabilia Of Elvis Presley And The Beatles (By Jerry Osborne, Perry Cox, and Joe Lindsay) Pub. Ballantine Books/House Of Collectibles ISBN 0-876-37080-6

(1990) The Beatles Price Guide For American Records Third Edition (By Perry Cox and Joe Lindsay) Pub. Perry Cox Ent./Biodisc ISBN 0-9617-347-4-4

(1993) The Beatles Price Guide For American Records Revised Third Edition Pub. Perry Cox Ent./Biodisc ISBN 0-9617-347-6-0

(1995) The Official Price Guide To The Beatles Records And Memorabilia (By Perry Cox and Joe Lindsay) Pub. Ballantine Books/House Of Collectibles ISBN 0-876-37940-4

(1999) The Official Price Guide To The Beatles Records And Memorabilia Revised Second Edition (By Perry Cox) Pub. Ballantine Books/House Of Collectibles ISBN 0-676-60181-2

(2007) Price Guide For The Beatles American Records 6th Edition (By Perry Cox and Frank Daniels. Foreword by Bruce Spizer) Pub. 498 Productions ISBN 978-0-9662649-6-8

(2017) Price and Reference Guide for the Beach Boys American Records (By Perry Cox, Frank Daniels & Mark Galloway. Foreword by Jeffrey Foskett). Perry Cox Ent. ISBN 978-1-5323-4857-0

== Journal articles about Perry Cox ==
Sept 26, 1983, US Magazine

March 5, 1990, Forbes Magazine

June 1990, Eastern Review (in an article about record collecting titled, "Spun Gold,").

The Sunday Mirror featured Cox in an article about his purchase of Paul McCartney's original birth certificate. This article was circulated worldwide. See the November 12, 1995 issue of the magazine. The purchase had taken place in 1984, at which time Perry Cox and Joe Lindsay were profiled in the Arizona Republic. From the February 25, 1984, issue.

== Other works and contributions ==
Cox has authored numerous published articles in Beatles collector magazines such as ''Beatlefan'' and ''Good Day Sunshine''. An article about Beatles autographs appeared in issue #75, dated Winter, 1994, and Beatlology

He occasionally writes for broader magazines, such as DISCoveries, June 1989, and Fall 1989, issues (one of which was co-written by Joe Lindsay.)

Contributor to the published works of Bruce Spizer, writing the forewords for two of his books: ''The Beatles Records on Vee-Jay'' and ''The Beatles Swan Song.'' In addition, he contributed to the content of all of Spizer's books about American records.

Wrote a foreword for Mitch McGeary's books about Beatles concerts and the collecting of concert tickets.

The ''AppleLog'' series, by Jeff Levy, credited Cox with providing collaborative information.This is true of at least two editions, including the most recent (fifth) edition from 2006.

He contributed to the third edition of ''The Beatles Memorabilia Price Guide,'' by Jeff Augsburger, Marty Eck, and Rick Rann, which was published in 1998.

Cox provided assistance on books within the sphere of record collecting but not directly related to the Beatles. For example, Jerry Osborne's Price Guide to Elvis Presley Records and Memorabilia, published in 1998 by the House of Collectibles.

He contributed to Joe Lindsay's ''Picture Discs of the World Price Guide,'' published in 1990 by BIODisc.

He is personally thanked in the credits to the DVD edition of The Kids Are Alright a notable film about the Who.

He is credited in the film, "Good Ol' Freda" issued in 2014.

== Appearances ==
Perry Cox appeared as a featured guest at Beatles Conventions, such as the 2007 Beatles convention in Las Vegas.

== Reviews ==
Positive reviews of his books have appeared in magazines devoted to collecting (e.g., ''Goldmine'' such as this review, written by Mark Wallgren—author of the Beatles on Record—for the November 5, 1999, issue: as well as Beatles-related publications (e.g., ''Beatlology'' Includes an interview mentioned on the cover of the first issue (September/October 1998) as well as interviews in later issues.

I have dealt with Perry, spoke to him on the phone for almost an hour just talking about Beach Boys. He is extremely knowledgeable and like to consider him a friend as I have also bought and sold with him. Adam Halloran on January 5, 2017

Perry Cox - One of the Absolute Top Leading Authorities on Beatles Records & Memorabilia and Author of "The Official Price Guide To The Beatles Records And Memorabilia".

Review of Price and Reference Guide for the Beach Boys American Records, Feb 23, 2018 by Giggens

Reviews of Price and Reference Guide for the Beach Boys American Records, Amazon.com

Reviews of Price Guide For The Beatles American Records 6th Edition, Amazon.com

Review of Price and Reference Guide for the Beach Boys American Records 103.6 "The Fox" March 19, 2018.
