= Ben Homer =

American songwriter (1917–1975)

Ben Homer (born Benjamin Hozer, 27 June 1917, not to be confused with Benjamin Charles Homer, Meriden, Connecticut – 12 February 1975, Los Angeles, California) was an American songwriter, composer and arranger.

== Biography ==
He joined the Meriden Symphony Orchestra when he was eleven years old, and wrote a class song at Jefferson Junior High School in 1932. He became a member of the American Federation of Musicians when he was fifteen. He later attended the New England Conservatory of Music on a scholarship, and returned there as a teacher in the 1940s.

He began his professional career by moving to New York City in 1938 and changing his name to Homer. He began composing for bandleader Les Brown in 1940, writing some material with lyricist Bud Green.

His most popular works are "Sentimental Journey" (1944), "Bizet Has His Day" (1945) (a jazz arrangement of Georges Bizet's "Farandole" from L’Arlésienne-Suite), "Shoot the Sherbet to Me Herbert" (1939), and "Joltin' Joe Di Maggio" (1941).
