= Beaucoups of Blues (song) =

- US picture sleeve

Single by Ringo Starr

from the album Beaucoups of Blues
- B-side: "Coochy Coochy"
- Released: 5 October 1970 (US only)
- Recorded: 25–26 June 1970
- Studio: Music City Recorders, Nashville, Tennessee
- Genre: Country
- Length: 2:35
- Label: Apple
- Songwriter: Buzz Rabin
- Producer: Pete Drake

Ringo Starr singles chronology
| "Beaucoups of Blues" (1970) | "It Don't Come Easy" (1971) |

"Beaucoups of Blues" is the title song from Ringo Starr's 1970 country album of the same name. It was released as Starr's first solo single on 5 October 1970 on Apple (Note: US Apple 2969) in several countries, but not the UK, and entered the charts in both the US and Germany where it reached number 87 and number 43 respectively. The song was written by Nashville singer-songwriter Buzz Rabin, and appeared on his 1974 solo album Cross Country Cowboy.

The song was later included on Starr's greatest hits albums Blast from Your Past and Photograph: The Very Best of Ringo Starr. In 2015, it was included on the album Dylan, Cash, and the Nashville Cats: A New Music City, released to accompany the similarly titled exhibition at the Country Music Hall of Fame.

== Recording ==
Starr recorded "Beaucoups of Blues" in Nashville during an overnight session on 25–26 June 1970. He selected it from material compiled by Pete Drake, his producer, who had amassed a collection of potential songs from Nashville songwriters for Starr's country album.

== Reception ==
Cash Box described the song as a "fine country single," further stating that it is "gentle and easy going and Ringo sounds right at home." Record World said that "Ringo Starr's C&W warblings will not go unnoticed in either the country or pop fields."
