= Sentimental Journey (song) =

Original song composed by Les Brown and Ben Homer, lyrics by Bud Green

Single by Les Brown Orchestra, featuring Doris Day
- B-side: "Twilight Time"
- Released: 1945
- Recorded: November 20, 1944
- Genre: Big band, pop
- Label: Columbia
- Songwriters: Les Brown, Ben Homer and Bud Green

"Sentimental Journey" is a popular song originally performed by Doris Day and published by Columbia Records in 1944. The music was written by Les Brown and Ben Homer, and the lyrics were written by Bud Green. It has since been covered by Ringo Starr and Rod Stewart.

== History ==
Les Brown and His Band of Renown had been performing the song, but were unable to record it because of the 1942–1944 musicians' strike. When the strike ended, the band, with Doris Day as vocalist, recorded the song for Columbia Records on November 20, 1944, and they had a hit record with the song, Doris Day's first number one hit, in 1945. The song's release coincided with the end of the Second World War in Europe and became the unofficial homecoming theme for many veterans. The recording was released by Columbia Records as catalog number 36769, with the flip side "Twilight Time". The record first reached the Billboard chart on March 29, 1945, and lasted 23 weeks on the chart, peaking at number one. The song reached the chart after the later-recorded "My Dreams Are Getting Better All the Time".

== Lyrics ==
The song describes someone about to take a train to a place to which they have a great emotional attachment, and their mounting anticipation while wondering why they ever roamed away. The opening verse is:

Gonna take a sentimental journey
Gonna set my heart at ease
Gonna make a sentimental journey
To renew old memories.

== Cover versions ==
Ringo Starr recorded the album as the title track for his debut studio album, Sentimental Journey (1970).

Bob Dylan covered the song on his album Triplicate (2017).
