= Never Without You =

Single by Ringo Starr

from the album Ringo Rama
- B-side: "Instant Amnesia"
- Released: 3 March 2003
- Recorded: 2002
- Genre: Rock
- Length: 4:15 (Radio Edit); 5:24 (album version)
- Label: Koch
- Songwriters: Ringo Starr, Mark Hudson, Gary Nicholson
- Producer: Mark Hudson

Ringo Starr singles chronology
"La De Da" (1998)	"Never Without You" (2003)	"Liverpool 8" (2007)

"Never Without You" is a tribute song from Ringo Starr to his former Beatles bandmate George Harrison, who died on 29 November 2001. The recording appeared on Starr's 2003 album Ringo Rama, and was also released as a single.

== History ==
"Never Without You" was co-written by Starr, Mark Hudson and Gary Nicholson. Starr commented: "Gary Nicholson started that song, and Mark brought it over and we realized we could tailor it. George was really on my mind then." In a 2003 interview, Starr said that he had remained closest to Harrison of all the former Beatles following the group's break-up in 1970, and that the song conveyed "how I miss him in my heart and in music".

The recording includes a lead guitar part by Harrison's friend Eric Clapton. Starr said of Clapton's contribution: "Eric's on two tracks on the album [Ringo Rama], but I really wanted him on this song because George loved Eric and Eric loved George." Clapton uses Harrison's favourite technique, the slide guitar, to achieve the characteristic sound of a song of the deceased former Beatle.

== Lyrics ==
The heartfelt lyrics of "Never Without You" are sometimes misquoted, especially the following lines, which refer to the titles of two of Harrison's songs from the Beatles' Abbey Road and Harrison's All Things Must Pass albums, respectively:

- "Here Comes the Sun" is about you
- "I Dig Love" is about you

Starr uses the riff-driven melody from Harrison's song "What Is Life" in the middle of "Never Without You", right before he makes reference to "All Things Must Pass". The lyrics also mention Harrison's composition "Within You Without You" from the Beatles' Sgt. Pepper's Lonely Hearts Club Band album. After the first chorus, the lyric goes “Here today, not alone” which is a reference to the 1982 Paul McCartney song “Here Today”, which was written as a tribute to former bandmate John Lennon after he was murdered.

== Personnel ==
Personnel are taken from the Ringo Rama CD liner notes.

- Ringo Starr – drums, percussion, keyboards
- Mark Hudson – bass, backing vocals
- Eric Clapton – guitar solo
- Jim Cox – organ
- Steve Dudas – electric guitar
- Gary Burr – acoustic guitar, backing vocals
- Gary Nicholson – 12-string acoustic guitar
