= Paul Du Noyer =

Music journalist and author

- Born: 21 May 1954 (age 72); Liverpool, Lancashire, England
- Occupations: Rock critic, journalist, editor, author
- Known for: Founding editor of Mojo
- Website: http://www.pauldunoyer.com/

Paul Du Noyer (born Paul Anthony Du Noyer; 21 May 1954) is an English rock journalist and author. He has written and edited for the music magazines NME, Q and Mojo. Du Noyer is the author of several books on the music industry, rock musicians, London and on his hometown, Liverpool.

== Early life ==
Du Noyer was born in Liverpool, then in Lancashire, and educated at the London School of Economics.

== Career ==
Du Noyer began his writing career in London after moving from Liverpool at the age of eighteen. He was a freelance journalist from 1978 to 1980 and then worked as an assistant editor for the NME before becoming a staff writer in 1980. At Q, he was assistant editor until 1990 and then served as editor before becoming the founding editor of Mojo magazine. In the latter role, he won an award for "Editor of the year" in 1994. He left Mojo in 1995 but remains a contributing editor.

During his career as a rock journalist and editor, Du Noyer has interviewed music artists such as David Bowie, Bruce Springsteen, Van Morrison and Madonna. In 1997, he wrote We All Shine On, a book about the solo songs of John Lennon.

Du Noyer has worked as an editorial consultant for clients such as Paul McCartney and Yoko Ono. He edited the programme for McCartney's 1989–90 world tour and wrote an essay there forwarding McCartney's association with the 1960s avant-garde scene in London. The programme was part of McCartney's campaign, begun in 1986, to challenge the public's perception of him as musically conservative in the years following Lennon's murder in 1980. Du Noyer went on to serve as editor of subsequent McCartney tour programmes and has supplied the liner notes for several McCartney album reissues.

Du Noyer was associate editor at The Word magazine from 2002 until its demise in 2012.

== Books and publications ==
- The Story of Rock 'n' Roll (1995)
- We All Shine On: The Stories Behind Every John Lennon Song (1997)
- The Clash: Modern Icons (1998)
- Marc Bolan (Virgin Modern Icons) (1999)
- Liverpool: Wondrous Place (2002)
- In the City: A Celebration of London Music (2010)
- John Lennon: The Stories Behind Every Song 1970–1980 (2010)
- Working Class Hero (2010)
- Deaf School: The Non-Stop Pop Art Punk Rock Party (2013)
- Conversations with McCartney (2015)
