= Beaucoups of Blues =

Studio album by Ringo Starr
- Released: 25 September 1970
- Recorded: 25–27 June 1970
- Studios: Music City Recorders, Nashville, Tennessee
- Genre: Country
- Length: 33:25
- Label: Apple
- Producer: Pete Drake

Ringo Starr chronology
Sentimental Journey (1970)	Beaucoups of Blues (1970)	Ringo (1973)

Singles from Beaucoups of Blues
- 1. "Beaucoups of Blues" Released: 5 October 1970 (US), 3 December 1970 (Australia)

Beaucoups of Blues is the second studio album by the musician and former Beatle Ringo Starr. It was released in September 1970, five months after his debut solo album, Sentimental Journey. Beaucoups of Blues is far removed from its pop-based predecessor, relying on country and western influences.

A longtime fan of the genre, Starr recorded the album over three days in Nashville with producer Pete Drake and an ensemble of local session players. Beaucoups of Blues failed to chart in Britain but achieved moderate commercial success in the United States, where it reached number 35 on Billboard's Country Albums list and number 65 on the Billboard Top LPs chart.

== Background ==
During Ringo Starr's tenure with the Beatles he had dabbled with country music: he sang lead on the Beatles version of Buck Owens's country hit "Act Naturally", co-wrote the country-influenced track "What Goes On" and wrote the country song "Don't Pass Me By". Before these recordings, Starr's championing of the genre inspired the band's move towards country music on their 1964 album Beatles for Sale. While playing on sessions for George Harrison's All Things Must Pass in May–June 1970, Starr met American pedal steel guitarist Pete Drake, whom Harrison had arranged to fly to London to play on some of the tracks. Starr had to pick up Drake from the airport so that the pair could record with Harrison; Drake noticed the number of country albums Starr had in his vehicle. Realising Drake's deep connection to country, Starr asked him if they could collaborate on an album together. Drake told Starr his musician friends could compose more than an album's worth of material in a week, which Starr thought was "impossible". Starr was very keen and agreed. Starr promptly flew to Nashville on 22 June.

== Recording ==
Starr's original idea was to have the sessions take place in England and send the master tapes of the finished tracks to Drake. However, Drake convinced him to have the sessions take place in Nashville instead. All of the tracks were cut in three days, on 25, 26 and 27 June 1970, at Music City Recorders. Sessions were engineered by Scotty Moore. All the material for the album was written purposely for Starr. (Note: Starr wrote a song that he intended to record for Beaucoups of Blues, "Band of Steel", but gave the song to Guthrie Thomas for his album Lies and Alibis (1976).) Guitarist Charlie Daniels recalled the sessions as "pretty typical Nashville sessions. You know, three songs in three hours. It was go in, sit down and work. Here's the songs, here's the chords, let's get it done. It was not a Beatles-type leisurely session. It was work."

We did the album in two nights. ... I was only there three days recording. I'd learn five songs in the morning and I'd go and record five songs that night. It was really good.

— Ringo Starr,

Starr sang a duet with Jeannie Kendall on the track "I Wouldn't Have You Any Other Way". Also recorded during the sessions was the B-side to the title track, "Coochy Coochy", which originally ran to 28 minutes in length. The sessions went exceedingly well, according to Starr, who has said that they recorded "a few other tracks that we didn't put out" and ended the sessions with two long jam sessions, one lasting 18 minutes and the other 20 minutes. Session drummer D. J. Fontana recalled that Starr "never varied from that tempo. He had the greatest conception of tempo I've ever heard in my life. I have never heard anybody play that steady in my life, and that's a long time." Acetate discs of the album, which were titled Ringo in Nashville, were sold at an auction in August 1992, featured a different track order and included songs not featured on the released version of the album. (Note: One such unreleased track is "The Wishing Book"; recorded on 26 June.) It was clear to all that Starr's vocals were much more suited to the genre of country than the old standards that characterised Sentimental Journey. For Starr, making Beaucoups of Blues had fulfilled a lifelong ambition.

== Sessions ==
- 25 June 1970 (6PM-9PM): "Woman of the Night"; "Without Her"
- 25 June 1970 (10PM-1AM): "Beaucoups of Blues"; "Love Don't Last Long"; "Waiting"
- 26 June 1970 (6PM-9PM): "I'd Be Talking All The Time"; "$15 Draw"
- 26 June 1970 (10PM-1AM): "Wine, Women And Loud Happy Songs"; "The Wishing Book"
- 27 June 1970 (6PM-9PM): "Fastest Growing Heartache in the West"; "Silent Homecoming"; "Loser's Lounge"
- 27 June 1970 (10PM-1AM): "I Wouldn't Have You Any Other Way"; "Coochy-Coochy"; "Nashville Freakout" (a.k.a. "Nashville Jam")

== Release ==
Beaucoups of Blues was released on 25 September 1970 in the UK (Note: UK Apple PAS 10002) and on 28 September in the US. (Note: US Apple SMAS 3368) The title track was released as a single in the US, backed with the non-album track "Coochy Coochy" on 5 October 1970 and in Australia on 3 December 1970. As with Sentimental Journey, the fan base was bemused by Starr's abrupt change in style. Beaucoups of Blues did not perform nearly as well as its predecessor, missing the UK charts and reaching only number 65 in the US. The album fared better in other countries, peaking at number 34 in Canada, number 33 in Australia, and number 21 in Norway.

Album cover design and Art direction, John Kosh with The front cover of Beaucoups of Blues, according to Sorrells Pickard, was taken outside musician Tracy Nelson's (Mother Earth – The Blues Broads) smokehouse in Nashville by Marshall Fallwell, Jr. The back cover featured a photo of a large majority of the musicians that appeared on the album. In light of the tepid commercial reaction, Starr would refrain from further album releases for the time being, preferring to concentrate on his second vocation, film acting. On 18 October, Apple announced that a second album of the Nashville recordings would be released; however, the album never materialised. Beaucoups of Blues was remastered and reissued on CD in 1995, on 1 May in the UK, (Note: UK EMI CDPAS 10002) and on 1 August in the US. (Note: US Apple CDSP 8 32678 2) This edition came with two bonus tracks: "Coochy Coochy" and a jam with all the musicians titled "Nashville Jam".

== Critical reception ==
Professional ratings
Review scores
Source	Rating
AllMusic	4/5 stars
Christgau's Record Guide	B
The Encyclopedia of Popular Music	2/5 stars
The Essential Rock Discography	5/10
MusicHound Rock	4/5
Q	3/5 stars
The Rolling Stone Album Guide	2/5 stars
The Village Voice	B

Writing for Rolling Stone, Charles Burton remarked: "If Beaucoups of Blues reminds one of any record, it's Nashville Skyline, only instead of being lovable, spaced-out Bobby Dylan in front of those luxurious Nashville backups, it's lovable Richard Starkey who is crooning his heart out." In an interview with Jann Wenner of Rolling Stone on 8 December 1970, John Lennon called the album "a good record", but qualified that comment by saying he "didn't feel as embarrassed as I did about [Starr's] first record".

In Melody Maker, Richard Williams remarked on Starr's limitations as a vocalist but found that his "conviction and charm" were such that Beaucoups of Blues "forces one to abdicate from any hip posture and admit, just this once, to sheer uncomplicated enjoyment". Williams acknowledged the key roles played by Drake and guitarist Chuck Howard, before concluding: "One can imagine … that Ringo had a ball making this album. I had a ball listening to it." In his combined review of all the former Beatles' 1970 solo releases, Geoffrey Cannon of The Guardian rated Beaucoups of Blues as his favourite, saying: "The result is superb. Not because Ringo is a good singer, but because, this time, he's let himself be used well. People who work with men like Pete Drake and Charlie McCoy don't go wrong." Writing in Saturday Review magazine, Ellen Sander described the LP as "so protective and perfect a presentation of a vastly underestimated singing talent" and paired it with Harrison's All Things Must Pass as solo albums that "delight in their individuality while recognizing, but not relying on, a former mode of expression". Village Voice critic Robert Christgau believed Starr was trying to impersonate Buck Owens while singing flat, if not entirely faint, but concluded that "both the songs and Pete Drake's production bespeak a high-quality obsession – the music sticks. And Ringo is still Ringo, which means he's good at making himself felt."

Although it was only moderately successful at the time, some critics have since stated that Beaucoups of Blues is one of Starr's best albums. Bob Woffinden wrote in his 1981 book The Beatles Apart: "Ringo took his chance well and his homely lugubrious voice suited those typically maudlin country songs like a charm. It's one of the best Beatle solo albums." Among reviews of the 1995 reissue, Q magazine described it as "always likable and original" and "a collection of contemporary country songs, delivered by Ringo Starr in a languidly melancholic style curiously reminiscent of Michael Nesmith". Mojo editor Paul Du Noyer admired the "stellar cast of country players" on the recordings and added that "the groove is loose and fluent."

== Track listing ==
Side one
No.	Title	Writer(s)	Length
1.	"Beaucoups of Blues"	Buzz Rabin	2:33
2.	"Love Don't Last Long"	Chuck Howard	2:45
3.	"Fastest Growing Heartache in the West"	Larry Kingston, Fred Dycus	2:34
4.	"Without Her"	Sorrells Pickard	2:35
5.	"Woman of the Night"	Pickard	2:21
6.	"I'd Be Talking All the Time"	Howard, Kingston	2:10

Side two
No.	Title	Writer(s)	Length
1.	"$15 Draw"	Pickard	3:29
2.	"Wine, Women and Loud Happy Songs"	Kingston	2:18
3.	"I Wouldn't Have You Any Other Way"	Howard	2:57
4.	"Loser's Lounge"	Bobby Pierce	2:23
5.	"Waiting"	Howard	2:54
6.	"Silent Homecoming"	Pickard	3:55

1995 bonus tracks
No.	Title	Writer(s)	Length
13.	"Coochy Coochy"	Richard Starkey	4:48
14.	"Nashville Jam"	Jim Buchanan, Charlie Daniels, Pete Drake, D.J. Fontana, Buddy Harman, Howard, Junior Huskey, Ben Keith, Jerry Kennedy, Dave Kirby, Grover Lavender, Charlie McCoy, Pickard, Jerry Reed, George Richey, Jerry Shook, Starkey	6:39

== Personnel ==
- Ringo Starr – vocals, acoustic guitar; drums on "Nashville Jam"
- Chuck Howard – guitar
- Charlie Daniels – guitar
- Jerry Kennedy – guitar
- Dave Kirby – guitar
- Sorrells Pickard – guitar
- Jerry Reed – guitar
- Jerry Shook – guitar
- Ben Keith – pedal steel guitar
- Pete Drake – pedal steel guitar, producer
- Roy Huskey – upright bass
- Buddy Harman – drums
- D. J. Fontana – drums
- Jim Buchanan – fiddle
- George Richey – fiddle
- Grover Lavender – fiddle
- Charlie McCoy – harmonica
- The Jordanaires – backing vocals
- Jeannie Kendall (of The Kendalls) – backing vocals on "I Wouldn't Have You Any Other Way"
- Scotty Moore – engineer

== Charts ==
Chart (1970–71)	Peak position
Australian Albums (Kent Music Report)	33
Canada Top Albums/CDs (RPM)	34
Italian Albums (Musica e Dischi)	19
US Billboard 200	65

== Legacy ==
All of the songs on the album were first released by Starr. Cover versions followed, including several produced by Pete Drake.

In 1970 George Morgan released his version on "I Wouldn't Have You Any Other Way" as a single, produced by Pete Drake and engineered by Scotty Moore. It later appeared on the 1971 album Real George. In 1971 Jerry Lee Lewis covered "I'd Be Talkin' All the Time" on There Must Be More to Love Than This, with Buddy Harman on drums.

In 1972 Sorrells Pickard, who played on the album and wrote four of the songs, released his own versions of "$15 Draw" and "Without Her" on his self-titled album, produced by Pete Drake. In 1974 songwriter Buzz Rabin released his own version of "Beaucoups of Blues" on his album Cross Country Cowboy, produced by Pete Drake.

In 1976 Starr sang with Guthrie Thomas on Starr's own "Band of Steel" on Guthrie's album Lies and Alibis. The song was considered for inclusion on Beaucoups of Blues.

In 2012 Starr sang with Ray Wylie Hubbard on a cover of Starr's own "Coochy Coochy", on Hubbard's acclaimed album The Grifter's Hymnal.
