= Bruce Spizer =

American lawyer and Beatles expert (born 1955)

- Born: David Spizer; July 2, 1955 (age 71); New Orleans, Louisiana
- Education: B.A., M.B.A., J.D.
- Alma mater: Tulane University
- Occupations: Tax attorney, music historian
- Writing career
- Period: 1998–present
- Genre: Discography
- Subject: The Beatles
- Notable awards: Young Family Award for Professional Excellence
- Website: www.beatle.net

David "Bruce" Spizer (born July 2, 1955) is an American tax attorney in New Orleans, Louisiana, who is also recognized as an expert on the Beatles. He has published thirteen books about the band, and is frequently quoted as an authority on their history and their recordings.

== Biography ==
Spizer was born and raised in New Orleans. He attended Isidore Newman School and then received B.A., M.B.A., and J.D. degrees from Tulane University, where he was a member of honorary societies Phi Beta Kappa and the Order of the Coif. While pursuing his legal career, he also managed the Cold, a popular new wave band in New Orleans.

In 1997, Spizer earned a large legal fee from the settlement of a class action lawsuit, and decided to use some of the money to replace his childhood collection of Beatles LPs (which had been damaged by cockroaches) with a new set of first edition albums. Drawn into the world of Beatles collectors, he ended up writing and self-publishing The Beatles Records on Vee-Jay, about the relationship between EMI, the Beatles' U.K. record label, and Vee-Jay Records, the U.S. label that released the band's first records in the U.S. As of 2020, Spizer has written and published twelve books about the Beatles. A reviewer for The New York Times described his books as containing "a wealth of detail about the Beatles' American recordings and their first visit to the United States, touching on everything from contracts and lawsuits to promotional materials, all richly illustrated." A New York Daily News article called his The Beatles' Story on Capitol Records "a Beatle collector's fantasy by a fanatic Beatles collector and historian."

The books about the Capitol releases were issued into two separate volumes: Part One, Beatlemania & The Singles and Part Two, The Albums, both issued in 2000. These were followed by The Beatles On Apple Records (2003), which told about the record releases on the group's own Apple label. The following book was The Beatles Are Coming!, released in January 2004 which was issued to commemorate the 40th anniversary of the group's arrival in America. Spizer's next book was the 2005 release, The Beatles Solo on Apple Records, which gave a complete documentation about the solo recordings of John Lennon, George Harrison, Ringo Starr and Paul McCartney that were released between 1968 and 1975. His sixth book in the series was The Beatles Swan Song: "She Loves You" & Other Records, a 2007 publication that told about the American-released Beatles records that were issued on the Swan, United Artists, Decca, MGM, Atco and Polydor labels. It also features information about the Beatles albums and singles released by Capitol in the 1970s and 1980s. In 2011, Spizer released Beatles For Sale On Parlophone, which documented Beatles discs released in the U.K. from 1962 through 1970, including the Parlophone EPs, which, according to Spizer, "up until now haven't been accurately documented in any book." In 2017, he also published The Beatles and 'Sgt. Pepper': A Fans' Perspective which coincided with the 50th anniversary of the release of this ground-breaking album.

Spizer has served as a consultant to EMI and Apple Records for their CD re-releases of the American configurations of the Beatles catalog. He wrote the text for the companion booklet for the 2006 box set The Capitol Albums, Volume 2, and for the "catalography" that accompanies the 2009 "Box of Vision" release. In 2015, he contributed to the re-release of 1, by providing scans of international picture sleeves of some singles for the booklet. He was also chosen to write 2,592 questions for a special Beatles edition of the Trivial Pursuit board game.

Spizer has appeared on television programs such as CBS's The Early Show, Fox News, and Good Morning America, and on the National Public Radio news program All Things Considered. He has been cited as a Beatles authority in print publications such as Rolling Stone, The Guardian, The New York Times, and Time.

== Books ==
- The Beatles Records on Vee-Jay (1998), Foreword by Perry Cox. ISBN 0-9662649-0-8
- The Beatles' Story on Capitol Records – Part One: The Singles (2000), ISBN 0-9662649-1-6
- The Beatles' Story on Capitol Records – Part Two: The Albums (2000), ISBN 0-9662649-2-4
- The Beatles on Apple Records (2003), Foreword by Ken Mansfield. ISBN 0-9662649-4-0
- The Beatles Are Coming! (2003), ISBN 0-9662649-9-1
- The Beatles Solo on Apple Records (2005), ISBN 0-9662649-5-9
- The Beatles Swan Song: "She Loves You" & Other Records (2007), Foreword by Perry Cox ISBN 0-9662649-7-5
- Beatles For Sale on Parlophone Records (2011), ISBN 0-9832957-0-0
- The Beatles and Sgt. Pepper: A Fans' Perspective (2017), ISBN 0-9832957-4-3
- The Beatles White Album and the Launch of Apple (2018), ISBN 978-0-9832957-5-4
- The Beatles Get Back To Abbey Road (2019), ISBN 978-0-9832957-6-1
- The Beatles Finally Let It Be (2020), ISBN 978-0-9832957-7-8
- The Beatles Magical Mystery Tour and Yellow Submarine (2021), ISBN 978-0-9832957-8-5
- The Beatles Rubber Soul to Revolver (2022), ISBN 978-0-9832957-9-2
- The Beatles Please Please Me to With The Beatles (2023), ISBN 979-8-9863190-3-2
- The Beatles A Hard Day's Night & More (2024), ISBN 979-8-9863190-8-7

== Other works ==
(2007) Published The Beatles Price Guide For American Records 6th Edition (By Perry Cox and Frank Daniels. Foreword by Bruce Spizer) Pub. 498 Productions ISBN 978-0-9662649-6-8
