= Harry Nilsson discography =

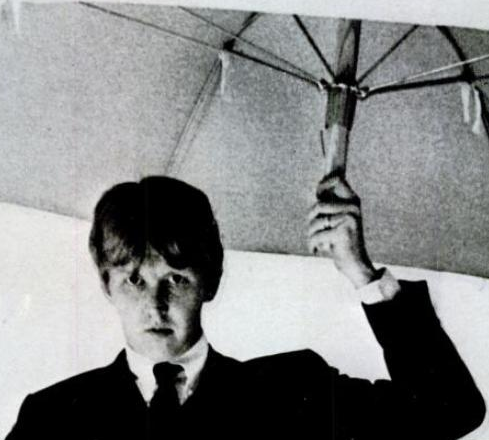
Trade ad for Harry Nilsson's single "You Can't Do That".

Harry Nilsson discography describes all musical releases credited to the American singer Harry Nilsson.

== Albums ==
These are the studio albums by Harry Nilsson, released by Tower Records, RCA Records and Mercury Records. His final album was released in 2019 via Omnivore Recordings.

=== Studio albums ===
| Year | Album information | Peak chart positions | | | | | Certifications |
| Year | Album information | US | UK | AUS | CAN | NOR | Certifications |
|---|---|---|---|---|---|---|---|
| 1966 | Spotlight on Nilsson: Released: 1966; Label: Tower | — | — | — | — | — | |
| 1967 | Pandemonium Shadow Show: Released: December 1967; Label: RCA | — | — | — | — | — | |
| 1968 | Aerial Ballet: Released: July 1968; Label: RCA | — | — | — | 60 | — | |
| 1969 | Harry: Released: April 3, 1969; Label: RCA | 120 | — | — | — | — | |
| 1970 | Nilsson Sings Newman: Released: January 26, 1970; Label: RCA | — | — | — | 61 | — | |
| 1970 | The Point!: Released: December 1970; Label: RCA | 25 | 46 | 56 | 22 | — | |
| 1971 | Nilsson Schmilsson: Released: November 1971; Label: RCA | 3 | 4 | 2 | 4 | 22 | RIAA: Gold; ARIA: Gold |
| 1972 | Son of Schmilsson: Released: July 1972; Label: RCA | 12 | 41 | 13 | 16 | — | RIAA: Gold |
| 1973 | A Little Touch of Schmilsson in the Night: Released: June 1973; Label: RCA | 46 | 20 | 19 | 93 | — | |
| 1974 | Pussy Cats: Released: August 19, 1974; Label: RCA | 60 | — | 45 | — | — | |
| 1975 | Duit on Mon Dei: Released: March 1975; Label: RCA | 141 | — | — | — | — | |
| 1976 | Sandman: Released: January 1976; Label: RCA | 111 | — | — | — | — | |
| 1976 | ...That's the Way It Is: Released: June 1976; Label: RCA | 158 | — | — | — | — | |
| 1977 | Knnillssonn: Released: July 1977; Label: RCA | 108 | — | — | — | — | |
| 1980 | Flash Harry: Released: 1980; Label: Mercury | — | — | — | — | — | |
| 2019 | Losst and Founnd: Released: 2019; Label: Omnivore Recordings | — | — | — | — | — | |
"—" denotes releases that did not chart or were not released in that territory.

=== Soundtracks ===
| Year | Album information | Peak chart positions | |
| Year | Album information | US | UK |
|---|---|---|---|
| 1968 | Skidoo: Released: 1968; Label: RCA; Length: 31:14 | — | — |
| 1971 | The Point!: Released: 1971; Label: RCA; Length: 35:43 | 25 | 46 |
| 1974 | Son of Dracula: Released: 1974; Label: Rapple/RCA; Length: 40:00 | 106 | — |
| 1980 | Popeye: Released: 1980; Label: Boardwalk | 115 | — |
"—" denotes releases that did not chart.

=== Archive releases ===
| Year | Album information |
|---|---|
| 1977 | Early Tymes: Released: 1977; Label: Musicor |
| 1988 | A Touch More Schmilsson in the Night: Released: 1988; Label: RCA/BMG; Length: 57:40 |
| 1994 | Nilsson '62: The Debut Sessions: Released: 1994; Label: Fuel |
| 2001 | Hollywood Dreamer: Released: 2001; Label: RPM |
| 2013 | The RCA Albums Collection: Released: 2013; Label: Legacy/RCA/SME; Length: 869:09 |
| 2018 | Music from the Motion Picture Popeye: The Harry Nilsson Demos: Released: 2018; Label: Varese Sarabande |
| 2019 | Losst and Founnd: Released: November 22, 2019; Label: Omnivore; Length: 42:50 |

=== Remixes ===
| Year | Album information | Peak chart positions |
| Year | Album information | US |
|---|---|---|
| 1971 | Aerial Pandemonium Ballet: Released: 1971; Label: RCA; Length: 29:58 | 149 |

=== Compilations ===
| Album information | Peak chart positions | |
| Album information | US | AUS |
|---|---|---|
| The Best of Nilsson: Released: 1977; Label: RCA | — | 11 |
| Nilsson – Greatest Hits: Released: 1978; Label: RCA | — | — |
| Portrait of Nilsson: Released: 1980; Label: RCA | — | 33 |
| Nilsson: Greatest Hits: Released: 1980; Label: RCA | — | — |
| Everybody's Talkin': The Very Best of Harry Nilsson: Released: 1980; Label: RCA | — | — |
| Harry Nilsson – All Time Greatest Hits: Released: 1989; Label: RCA/BMG | 140 | — |
| Personal Best: The Harry Nilsson Anthology: Released: February 28, 1995; Label: RCA/BMG 07863-66354 | — | — |
| Legendary Harry Nilsson: Released: 2000; Label: BMG 74321785652 | — | — |
| The Essential Nilsson: Released: April 30, 2013; Label: SME 88883-77156 | — | — |
| The RCA Albums Collection: Released: July 30, 2013; Label: Legacy/RCA/SME | — | — |
"—" denotes releases that did not chart.

== Singles ==
| Year | Title | Peak chart positions | | | | | | Album |
| Year | Title | US | CAN | UK | AUS | IRE | NL | Album |
|---|---|---|---|---|---|---|---|---|
| 1964 | "Baa Baa Blacksheep" (As Bo Pete) b/w "Baa Baa Blacksheep (Part Two)" | — | — | — | — | — | — | non-album singles |
| 1964 | "Do You Wanna (Have Some Fun)" (As Bo Pete) b/w "Groovy Little Suzie" | — | — | — | — | — | — | non-album singles |
| 1964 | "Donna I Understand" (As Johnny Niles) b/w "Wig Job" | — | — | — | — | — | — | non-album singles |
| 1964 | "Stand Up and Holler" (As Foto-Fi Four) | — | — | — | — | — | — | non-album singles |
| 1964 | "Sixteen Tons" b/w "I'm Gonna Lose My Mind" | — | — | — | — | — | — | Spotlight on Nilsson |
| 1965 | "You Can't Take Your Love Away from Me" b/w "Born in Grenada" | — | — | — | — | — | — | Spotlight on Nilsson |
| 1965 | "The Path That Leads to Trouble" b/w "Good Times" | — | — | — | — | — | — | Spotlight on Nilsson |
| 1966 | "She's Yours" b/w "Growin' Up" | — | — | — | — | — | — | Spotlight on Nilsson |
| 1967 | "Without Her" b/w "Freckles" | — | — | — | — | — | — | Pandemonium Shadow Show |
| 1967 | "You Can't Do That" (written by Lennon-McCartney) b/w "Ten Little Indians" | 122 | 10 | — | — | — | — | Pandemonium Shadow Show |
| 1967 | "River Deep – Mountain High" b/w "She Sang Hymns Out of Tune" | — | — | — | — | — | — | Pandemonium Shadow Show |
| 1967 | "Good Old Desk" b/w "Together" | — | — | — | — | — | — | Aeriel Ballet |
| 1968 | "One" b/w "Sister Marie" | — | — | — | — | — | — | Aeriel Ballet |
| 1968 | "Everybody's Talkin'" (written by Fred Neil) b/w "Don't Leave Me" | 113 | 35 | — | — | — | — | Aeriel Ballet |
| 1969 | "I Will Take You There" b/w "Rainmaker" | — | — | — | — | — | — | Skidoo |
| 1969 | "Everybody's Talkin'" (Re-release) b/w "Rainmaker" | 6 | 1 | 23 | 30 | — | 34 | Aerial Ballet |
| 1969 | "Good Times" b/w "Growin' Up" | — | — | — | — | — | — | Spotlight on Nilsson |
| 1969 | "Maybe" b/w "Marchin' Down Broadway" | — | — | — | — | — | — | Harry |
| 1969 | "I Guess the Lord Must Be in New York City" b/w "Maybe" | 34 | 25 | — | 66 | — | — | Harry |
| 1970 | "Waiting" b/w "I'll Be Home" (written by Randy Newman) | — | 31 | — | — | — | — | non-album single |
| 1970 | "Caroline" (written by Randy Newman) b/w "Yellow Man" (written by Randy Newman) | — | — | — | — | — | — | Nilsson Sings Newman |
| 1970 | "Down to the Valley" b/w "Buy My Album" | — | 80 | — | — | — | — | non-album single |
| 1971 | "Me and My Arrow" b/w "Are You Sleeping?" | 34 | 17 | — | 52 | — | — | The Point! |
| 1971 | "Without You" (written by Pete Ham and Tom Evans) b/w "Gotta Get Up" | 1 | 1 | 1 | 1 | 1 | 10 | Nilsson Schmilsson |
| 1972 | "Jump into the Fire" b/w "The Moonbeam Song" | 27 | 16 | — | 26 | — | — | Nilsson Schmilsson |
| 1972 | "Coconut" b/w "Down" | 8 | 5 | 42 | 90 | — | — | Nilsson Schmilsson |
| 1972 | "You're Breakin' My Heart" b/w "Remember (Christmas)" | — | — | — | 85 | — | — | Son of Schmilsson |
| 1972 | "Spaceman" b/w "Turn On Your Radio" | 23 | 12 | — | 95 | — | — | Son of Schmilsson |
| 1972 | "Remember (Christmas)" b/w "The Lottery Song" | 53 | 14 | — | — | — | — | Son of Schmilsson |
| 1972 | "Joy" (As Buck Earle) b/w "Joy (Stereo)" | — | — | — | — | — | — | Son of Schmilsson |
| 1973 | "As Time Goes By" (written by Herman Hupfeld) b/w "Lullaby in Ragtime" (written by Sylvia Fine) | 86 | 87 | — | 61 | — | — | A Little Touch of Schmilsson in the Night |
| 1974 | "Daybreak" b/w "Down" | 39 | 14 | 54 (Note: Chart position is from the official UK "Breakers List".) | 79 | — | — | non-album single |
| 1974 | "Many Rivers to Cross" (written by Jimmy Cliff) b/w "Don't Forget Me" | 109 | 43 | — | — | — | — | Pussy Cats |
| 1974 | "Subterranean Homesick Blues" (written by Bob Dylan) b/w "Mucho Mungo / St. Elga" | — | — | — | — | — | — | Pussy Cats |
| 1974 | "Save the Last Dance for Me" (written by Doc Pomus and Mort Shurtman) b/w "Subterranean Homesick Blues" (written by Bob Dylan) | — | — | — | — | — | — | Pussy Cats |
| 1974 | "Don't Forget Me" b/w "Loop De Loop" (written by Ted Vann) | — | — | — | — | — | — | Pussy Cats |
| 1975 | "A Love Like Yours (Don't Come Knocking Everyday)" (Featuring Cher) (written by Holland-Dozier-Holland) b/w "(Just Enough to Keep Me) Hangin' On" (Cher) | — | — | — | — | — | — | non-album single |
| 1975 | "Kojak Columbo" b/w "Turn Out The Light" | — | — | — | — | — | — | Duit on Mon Dei |
| 1976 | "Something True" | — | — | — | — | — | — | Sandman |
| 1976 | "Sail Away" (written by Randy Newman) b/w "Moonshine Bandit" | — | — | — | — | — | — | ...That's the Way It Is |
| 1976 | "Just One Look/Baby I'm Yours (medley)" (Featuring Lynda Laurence) b/w "That Is All" (written by George Harrison) | — | — | — | — | — | — | ...That's the Way It Is |
| 1977 | "Who Done It?" b/w "Perfect Day" | — | — | — | — | — | — | Knnillssonn |
| 1977 | "All I Think About Is You" b/w "Old Bones" | — | — | 43 | — | — | — | Knnillssonn |
| 1977 | "Lean on Me" b/w "Will She Miss Me" | — | — | — | — | — | — | Knnillssonn |
| 1978 | "Ain't It Kinda Wonderful" b/w "I'm Bringing a Red, Red Rose" | — | — | — | — | — | — | The World's Greatest Lover (soundtrack) |
| 1980 | "I Don't Need You" b/w "It's So Easy" | — | — | — | — | — | — | Flash Harry |
| 1980 | "Rain" b/w "Bright Side of Life" | — | — | — | — | — | — | Flash Harry |
| 1982 | "With a Bullet" (Beatlefest Only) b/w "Judy" | — | — | — | — | — | — | non-album single |
| 1984 | "Loneliness" (written by Yoko Ono) b/w "Silver Horse" (written by Yoko Ono) | — | — | — | — | — | — | Every Man Has a Woman |
| "—" denotes releases that did not chart or were not released in that territory. | | | | | | | | |

== Other Appearances ==
| Year | Title | Comment |
|---|---|---|
| 1984 | Every Man Has a Woman | A tribute album to Yoko Ono for her 50th birthday. Nilsson performs and produces "Silver Horse", "Dream Love", and "Loneliness". |
