= The RCA Albums Collection (Harry Nilsson box set) =

Box set by Harry Nilsson
- Released: July 30, 2013
- Genre: Pop
- Length: 869:09
- Label: Legacy/RCA Records

Professional ratings
Review scores
Source	Rating
AllMusic	4.5/5 stars
Rolling Stone	4/5 stars
The Independent	3/5 stars

The RCA Albums Collection is a 17-disc compilation album dedicated to American singer-songwriter Harry Nilsson. It was released in July 2013 by Legacy Recordings. The album includes 14 of Nilsson's solo albums from the 1960s and 1970s and three CDs worth of unreleased session recordings.

Assembled by Andrew Sandoval and Rob Santos, the set includes 11 of Nilsson's albums remastered by Vic Anesini. The three albums not remastered for this set were mastered by Anesini and include The Point, Nilsson Schmilsson, and Son of Schmilsson. The set includes each album in mini-cardboard replicas of the original vinyl packaging. Nilsson's first two albums include both mono and stereo mixes of the respective tracks with the mono tracks receiving their first CD release.

Missing from this set is the album Son of Dracula as, with the exception of the song "Daybreak" and the snippets of dialogue, all its tracks had previously been released on other albums or singles. ("Daybreak" itself is included in its single version.) Also omitted is the instrumental portion of the soundtrack Skidoo, which Nilsson wrote but did not perform. As well, this set explicitly only covers Nilsson's RCA work, so all non-RCA material is excluded (including several 1980s/1990s rarities and soundtrack appearances, and the pre- and post-RCA albums Spotlight on Nilsson, Flash Harry, Losst and Founnd, and the soundtrack of the film Popeye.)

The boxed set includes a booklet with brief comments on each album, full credits and rare pictures.

== Track listing ==
DISC ONE - Pandemonium Shadow Show (1967)
No.	Title	Length
1.	"Ten Little Indians"	2:50
2.	"1941"	2:42
3.	"Cuddly Toy"	2:53
4.	"She Sang Hymns Out of Tune"	2:25
5.	"You Can't Do That"	2:21
6.	"Sleep Late, My Lady Friend"	2:45
7.	"She's Leaving Home"	3:20
8.	"There Will Never Be"	2:33
9.	"Without Her"	2:20
10.	"Freckles"	2:24
11.	"It's Been So Long"	2:15
12.	"River Deep – Mountain High"	4:31
13.	"Ten Little Indians [mono]"	2:52
14.	"1941 [mono]"	2:39
15.	"Cuddly Toy [mono]"	2:52
16.	"She Sang Hymns Out of Tune [mono]"	2:24
17.	"You Can't Do That [mono]"	2:20
18.	"Sleep Late, My Lady Friend [mono]"	2:45
19.	"She's Leaving Home [mono]"	3:20
20.	"There Will Never Be [mono]"	2:32
21.	"Without Her [mono]"	2:22
22.	"Freckles [mono]"	2:25
23.	"It's Been So Long [mono]"	2:14
24.	"River Deep - Mountain High [mono]"	4:20

DISC TWO - Aerial Ballet (1968)
No.	Title	Length
1.	"Daddy's Song"	2:41
2.	"Good Old Desk"	2:21
3.	"Don't Leave Me"	2:19
4.	"Mr. Richland's Favorite Song"	2:15
5.	"Little Cowboy"	1:22
6.	"Together"	2:11
7.	"Everybody's Talkin'"	2:44
8.	"I Said Goodbye to Me"	2:16
9.	"Little Cowboy"	0:51
10.	"Mr. Tinker"	2:44
11.	"One"	2:54
12.	"The Wailing of the Willow"	2:01
13.	"Bath"	2:34
14.	"Daddy's Song [mono]"	2:43
15.	"Good Old Desk [mono]"	2:20
16.	"Don't Leave Me [mono]"	2:20
17.	"Mr. Richland's Favorite Song [mono]"	2:14
18.	"Little Cowboy [mono]"	1:22
19.	"Together [mono]"	2:09
20.	"Everybody's Talkin' [mono]"	2:47
21.	"I Said Goodbye to Me [mono]"	2:16
22.	"Little Cowboy [mono]"	0:51
23.	"Mr. Tinker [mono]"	2:44
24.	"One [mono]"	2:54
25.	"The Wailing of the Willow [mono]"	2:00
26.	"Bath [mono]"	2:25
27.	"Aerial Ballet Radio Spot"	1:01

DISC THREE - Harry (1969)
No.	Title	Length
1.	"The Puppy Song"	2:41
2.	"Nobody Cares About the Railroads Anymore"	2:44
3.	"Open Your Window"	2:07
4.	"Mother Nature's Son"	2:43
5.	"Fairfax Rag"	2:15
6.	"City Life"	2:30
7.	"Mournin' Glory Story"	2:14
8.	"Maybe"	3:08
9.	"Marchin' Down Broadway"	1:01
10.	"I Guess the Lord Must Be in New York City"	2:43
11.	"Rainmaker"	2:47
12.	"Mr. Bojangles"	3:55
13.	"Simon Smith and His Amazing Dancing Bear"	2:50
14.	"I Will Take You There (Single Mix)"	2:42
15.	"Waiting (From Jenny)"	2:23
16.	"Rainmaker (Single Mix)"	2:26
17.	"Mournin' Glory Story (Single Mix)"	2:15
18.	"Garbage Can Ballet (Alt. Version)"	2:29
19.	"Harry Radio Spot"	1:03
20.	"Voices of Vista Radio Spots"	2:52

DISC FOUR - Nilsson Sings Newman (1970)
No.	Title	Length
1.	"Vine St."	2:53
2.	"Love Story"	3:43
3.	"Yellow Man"	2:20
4.	"Caroline"	2:09
5.	"Cowboy"	2:56
6.	"The Beehive State"	2:08
7.	"I'll Be Home"	2:39
8.	"Living Without You"	2:38
9.	"Dayton, Ohio 1903"	1:54
10.	"So Long Dad"	2:41
11.	"Snow"	2:29
12.	"Love Story (Alt. Version)"	3:24
13.	"Cowboy (Alt. Version)"	2:22
14.	"I'll Be Home (Alt. Version)"	2:42
15.	"Living Without You (Alt. Version)"	2:39

DISC FIVE - The Point! (1971)
No.	Title	Length
1.	"Everything's Got 'Em"	2:29
2.	"The Town (Narration)"	1:28
3.	"Me and My Arrow"	2:05
4.	"The Game (Narration)"	1:51
5.	"Poli High"	2:40
6.	"The Trial and Banishment (Narration)"	2:12
7.	"Think About Your Troubles"	2:48
8.	"The Pointed Man (Narration)"	2:43
9.	"Life Line"	2:21
10.	"The Birds (Narration)"	1:58
11.	"P.O.V. Waltz"	2:12
12.	"The Clearing in the Woods (Narration)"	1:54
13.	"Are You Sleeping?"	2:18
14.	"Oblio's Return (Narration)"	3:20
15.	"Think About Your Troubles (Alt. Version)"	2:35
16.	"Life Line (Alt. Version)"	2:31
17.	"Down to the Valley (Alt. Mix with Extended Ending)"	2:35
18.	"I'll Never Leave You"	1:54
19.	"The Point Travel Brochure Radio Spot"	1:21

DISC SIX - Aerial Pandemonium Ballet (1971)
No.	Title	Length
1.	"Introduction"	0:09
2.	"1941"	2:36
3.	"Daddy's Song"	2:08
4.	"Mr. Richland's Favorite Song"	2:06
5.	"Good Old Desk"	2:30
6.	"Everybody's Talkin'"	2:42
7.	"Bath"	1:39
8.	"River Deep Mountain High (Remix)"	3:57
9.	"Sleep Late, My Lady Friend (Remix)"	2:38
10.	"Don't Leave Me (Remix)"	2:13
11.	"Without Her (Remix)"	2:11
12.	"Together (Remix)"	1:37
13.	"One (Remix)"	2:18
14.	"Closing"	0:27
15.	"You Can't Do That (Remix)"	2:16
16.	"It's Been So Long (Italian Version)"	2:11
17.	"Sleep Late, My Lady Friend (Italian Version)"	2:40
18.	"Without Her (Italian Version)"	2:19
19.	"Cuddly Toy (Italian Version)"	2:51
20.	"You Can't Do That (Italian Version)"	2:18
21.	"BBC Saturday Club Introduction"	0:48
22.	"1941 (Live on BBC's Saturday Club)"	2:30
23.	"Mr. Richland's Favorite Song (Live on BBC's Saturday Club)"	2:20
24.	"Nilsson Talks with Brian Matthew"	1:55
25.	"Together [Live on BBC's Saturday Club]"	2:06
26.	"Good Old Desk [Live on BBC's Saturday Club]"	2:30
27.	"Aerial Pandemonium Ballet Radio Spot"	0:57

DISC SEVEN - Nilsson Schmilsson (1971)
No.	Title	Length
1.	"Gotta Get Up"	2:23
2.	"Driving Along"	2:03
3.	"Early in the Morning"	2:50
4.	"The Moonbeam Song"	3:22
5.	"Down"	3:26
6.	"Without You"	3:21
7.	"Coconut"	3:50
8.	"Let the Good Times Roll"	2:42
9.	"Jump into the Fire"	7:00
10.	"I'll Never Leave You"	4:20
11.	"Si No Estas Tu"	3:14
12.	"How Can I Be Sure of You"	3:06
13.	"The Moonbeam Song"	3:32
14.	"Lamaze"	1:44
15.	"Old Forgotten Soldier"	2:43
16.	"Gotta Get Up (Alt. Version)"	2:19
17.	"Nisson Schmilsson Radio Spots"	2:41

DISC EIGHT - Son of Schmilsson (1972)
No.	Title	Length
1.	"Take 54"	4:18
2.	"Remember (Christmas)"	4:06
3.	"Joy"	3:42
4.	"Turn on Your Radio song review"	2:39
5.	"You're Breakin' My Heart"	3:08
6.	"Spaceman"	3:34
7.	"The Lottery Song"	2:25
8.	"At My Front Door"	3:00
9.	"Ambush"	5:21
10.	"I'd Rather Be Dead"	3:20
11.	"The Most Beautiful World in the World"	3:39
12.	"What's Your Sign?"	3:05
13.	"Take 54 (Alt. Version)"	3:39
14.	"Campo de Encino"	4:54
15.	"Daybreak (Single Version)"	3:06
16.	"It Had to Be You/I'd Rather Be Dead"	2:38
17.	"Son of Schmilsson Radio Spot"	0:52

DISC NINE - A Little Touch of Schmilsson in the Night (1973)
No.	Title	Length
1.	"Lazy Moon"	3:22
2.	"For Me and My Gal"	2:47
3.	"It Had to Be You"	2:31
4.	"Always"	1:49
5.	"Makin' Whoopee!"	4:30
6.	"You Made Me Love You (I Didn't Want to Do It)"	2:33
7.	"Lullaby in Ragtime"	3:40
8.	"I Wonder Who's Kissing Her Now"	2:38
9.	"What'll I Do"	2:27
10.	"Nevertheless (I'm in Love with You)"	2:39
11.	"This Is All I Ask"	3:36
12.	"As Time Goes By"	3:29
13.	"I'm Always Chasing Rainbows"	3:32
14.	"Make Believe"	2:25
15.	"Trust in Me"	2:29
16.	"It's Only a Paper Moon"	3:15
17.	"Thanks for the Memory"	2:48
18.	"Over the Rainbow"	3:49

DISC TEN - Pussy Cats (1974)
No.	Title	Length
1.	"Many Rivers to Cross"	5:00
2.	"Subterranean Homesick Blues"	3:20
3.	"Don't Forget Me"	3:40
4.	"All My Life"	3:14
5.	"Old Forgotten Soldier"	4:17
6.	"Save the Last Dance for Me"	4:32
7.	"Mucho Mungo/Mt. Elga"	3:48
8.	"Loop de Loop"	2:43
9.	"Black Sails"	3:17
10.	"Rock Around the Clock"	3:17
11.	"Down by the Sea"	5:37
12.	"The Flying Saucer Song"	6:29
13.	"Turn Out the Light"	2:32
14.	"Save the Last Dance for Me (Alt. Version)"	4:28
15.	"Don't Forget Me"	2:23
16.	"Black Sails"	2:39
17.	"Pussy Cats Radio Spots"	1:18

DISC ELEVEN - Duit on Mon Dei (1975)
No.	Title	Length
1.	"Jesus Christ You're Tall"	1:26
2.	"It's a Jungle Out There"	3:53
3.	"Down by the Sea"	2:31
4.	"Kojak Columbo"	3:13
5.	"Easier for Me"	2:31
6.	"Turn Out the Light"	2:32
7.	"Salmon Falls"	4:14
8.	"Puget Sound"	2:25
9.	"What's Your Sign?"	2:52
10.	"Home"	3:37
11.	"Good for God"	3:35
12.	"Goin' Down (Alt. Version)"	3:46

DISC TWELVE - Sandman (1976)
No.	Title	Length
1.	"I'll Take a Tango"	3:00
2.	"Something True"	2:58
3.	"Pretty Soon There'll Be Nothing Left for Everybody"	2:53
4.	"The Ivy Covered Walls"	3:15
5.	"Here's Why I Did Not Go to Work Today"	4:08
6.	"The Flying Saucer Song"	6:43
7.	"How to Write a Song"	3:14
8.	"Jesus Christ You're Tall"	4:10
9.	"Will She Miss Me?"	4:51
10.	"A Tree Out in the Yard (Central Park)"	4:32

DISC THIRTEEN - ...That's the Way It Is (1976)
No.	Title	Length
1.	"That Is All"	3:09
2.	"Just One Look/Baby I'm Yours"	3:23
3.	"Moonshine Bandit"	3:33
4.	"I Need You"	3:17
5.	"A Thousand Miles Away"	2:55
6.	"Sail Away"	3:45
7.	"She Sits Down on Me"	3:59
8.	"Daylight Has Caught Me"	3:52
9.	"Zombie Jamboree (Back to Back)"	3:03
10.	"That Is All (Reprise)"	1:38
11.	"That's the Way It Is Radio Spot"	1:02

DISC FOURTEEN - Knnillssonn (1977)
No.	Title	Length
1.	"All I Think About Is You"	4:05
2.	"I Never Thought I'd Get This Lonely"	5:05
3.	"Who Done It?"	5:20
4.	"Lean on Me"	2:50
5.	"Goin' Down"	3:12
6.	"Old Bones"	3:00
7.	"Sweet Surrender"	4:41
8.	"Blanket for a Sail"	2:33
9.	"Laughin' Man"	2:54
10.	"Perfect Day"	3:52
11.	"Ain't It Kinda Wonderful"	2:11
12.	"Sweet Lorraine"	7:39
13.	"Shuffle Off to Buffalo"	2:49
14.	"Ballin' the Jack"	4:03
15.	"All I Think About Is You"	4:41
16.	"Knnillssonn Radio Spot"	1:01

DISC FIFTEEN
No.	Title	Length
1.	"1941"	2:32
2.	"World"	2:01
3.	"Signs"	2:36
4.	"Cuddly Toy"	2:50
5.	"This Could Be the Night"	2:13
6.	"As I Wander Lonely"	2:00
7.	"The Family"	2:29
8.	"Miss Butter's Lament"	2:20
9.	"Mr. Tinker (Alt. Version)"	2:39
10.	"Leggenda"	2:53
11.	"Sister Marie (Stereo Remix)"	3:18
12.	"She Wandered Through the Garden Fence"	2:49
13.	"One (Alt. Version)"	2:23
14.	"I Said Goodbye to Me (Alt. Version)"	2:12
15.	"Searchin'"	3:12
16.	"She's Just Laughing at Me"	2:05
17.	"Together (Alt. Version)"	2:26
18.	"Bath (Alt. Version)"	2:42

DISC SIXTEEN
No.	Title	Length
1.	"You Are Here"	3:22
2.	"The Cast and Crew"	3:53
3.	"Garbage Can Ballet"	2:03
4.	"I Will Take You There"	2:32
5.	"Girlfriend"	2:44
6.	"Wasting My Time (Alt. Mix)"	3:49
7.	"Rainmaker (Alt. Version)"	2:40
8.	"Open Your Window"	2:11
9.	"Postcard"	3:18
10.	"Think About Your Troubles (Alt. Version)"	3:03
11.	"Marry Me a Little"	5:00
12.	"Ballin' the Jack"	2:26
13.	"Gotta Get Up"	1:53
14.	"Down to the Valley"	2:12
15.	"Buy My Album"	1:33
16.	"Joy (Alt. Version)"	2:32
17.	"Blackbird"	2:28
18.	"Paradise"	4:54
19.	"Lucille"	2:28
20.	"Early in the Morning (Alt. Version)"	2:17

DISC SEVENTEEN
No.	Title	Length
1.	"Walk Right Back"	2:31
2.	"Jump into the Fire (Alt. Version)"	3:08
3.	"Isolation"	3:00
4.	"Without You"	3:55
5.	"Driving Along"	0:56
6.	"Gotta Get Up"	1:53
7.	"Coconut"	4:02
8.	"Old Forgotten Soldier"	3:10
9.	"Down"	4:01
10.	"The Moonbeam Song (Alt. Demo)"	1:49
11.	"Jump into the Fire"	3:34
12.	"Per Chi"	3:15
13.	"Joy (Guitar Demo)"	1:55
14.	"Joy (Piano Demo)"	0:57
15.	"You Made Me Love You (I Didn't Want to Do It) (Alt. Version)"	2:29
16.	"Lullaby in Ragtime (Alt. Version)"	3:49
17.	"Always (Alt. Version)"	1:48
18.	"It Had to Be You (Alt. Version)"	2:40
19.	"I Want You to Sit on My Face"	2:53
20.	"A Souvenir"	1:10
