= Son of Dracula =

Son of Dracula may refer to:

- Son of Dracula (1943 film), an American horror film directed by Robert Siodmak
- Son of Dracula (1974 film), a British musical film directed by Freddie Francis
