= All for the Beatles =

"Stand Up and Holler"

Single by Foto-Fi Four
- B-side: "Stand Up and Holler"
- Released: 1964
- Length: 2:35
- Label: Foto-Fi Records
- Songwriter: John Marascalco/Harry Nilsson
- Producer: John Marascalco

"All for the Beatles" is a song written and released in 1964 by Harry Nilsson and John Marascalco. It was released as a single with the alternative title "Stand Up and Holler" under Nilsson's pseudonym Foto-Fi Four and was packaged with a synchronized standard 8 mm film of The Beatles first arriving in the United States in 1964.

The rhythm of "All for the Beatles" is similar to that of "Not Fade Away", a Buddy Holly cover by The Rolling Stones, which was also based on Bo Diddley's song "Bo Diddley". The song, which preceded the later friendship and collaboration of Nilsson with The Beatles, was not a commercial success, but the single became a sought-after collectible. A cover version was later released as "All for the Beatles (Stand Up and Holler)" by The Originals.

== History ==
The young Harry Nilsson recorded several songs by songwriter John Marascalco at a demo session for Scott Turner in 1962. He recorded and co-authored several songs with him; these were released as singles under Nilsson's pseudonym Bo Pete.

The Beatles came first to the USA in February 1964 to promote their upcoming tour by appearing on the Ed Sullivan Show, as well as performing two concerts in Carnegie Hall and at the Washington Coliseum. Their arrival at the airport, some subsequent press conferences, and their concerts were filmed. Nilsson and Marascalco jumped on the Beatlemania bandwagon and took advantage of the Beatles' tour in August 1964 as a context within which to release their own song. The four-part vocals were recorded by Nilsson through multitracking. An additional track added the harmonizing screams of backing vocalists, which were, according to Nilsson's biographer Alyn Shipton, probably from Beach Girls, a girl group that had supported the Bo Pete record Baa Baa Blacksheep.

== Release ==
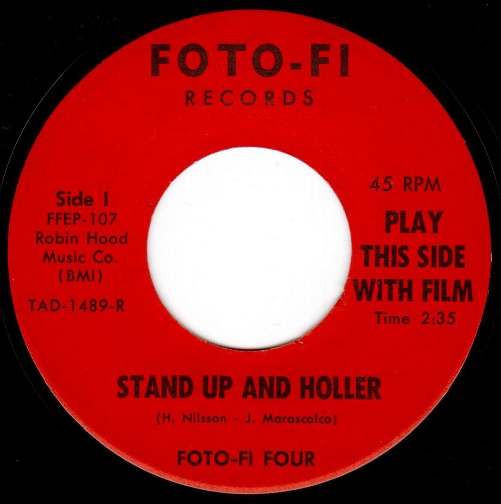
A-side of Foto-Fi 107 with the note "Play this side with film"

Marascalco released the song under his own BMI associated publishing company, Robin Hood Music, with the title "All for the Beatles". The copyright is not recorded at the Library of Congress. A standard 8 mm film, sealed in foil and showing clips of The Beatles recording in February 1964, was added to the 7" single, which was released under the alternative title "Stand Up and Holler". According to a note on the single and its sleeve, it is possible to play the song and film synchronously. Marascalco created a new label imprint called Foto-Fi Records for the release of "Stand Up and Holler", which was its only publication. Similarly, Nilsson used the new pseudonym Foto-Fi Four. The B-side of the single contained the same song but without the Beach Girls' backing vocals.

== Form ==
The musical structure of "All for the Beatles" is a traditional 12-bar blues framework, which repeats itself five times. As an introduction, there are two bars of a major scale tonic, and in the conclusion, several bars of a tonic guitar solo up to the fade out. The first and last 12-bar figures are split into strophe and refrain. Nilsson presents the strophes single-partly, but the four-part refrain was recorded by overdubbing. In the centre of the five blues frameworks there is an electric guitar solo.

The Bo Diddley beat

The song is based on a Bo Diddley beat. This one-bar rhythm was well known when "All for the Beatles" was recorded following its use in the American debut single "Not Fade Away", a Buddy Holly cover by The Rolling Stones. This beat was introduced in 1955 by Bo Diddley in his song "Bo Diddley" and he reused it several times.

== Cover versions ==
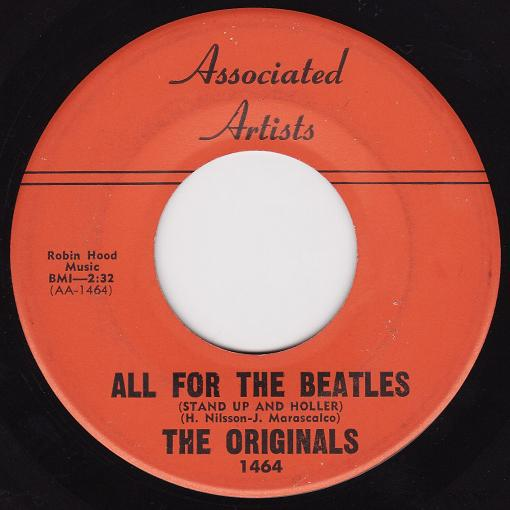
The Originals, Associated Artists 1464

The Originals recorded the song in the same year that it was released for the label Associated Artists. They used the title "All for the Beatles (Stand Up and Holler)". The song was released with "Will You Come Back My Love?" as the B-side.

In 1965, Marascalco adapted the rhythm and melody of "All for the Beatles" for the song "Mary Mary", which was recorded by the Doo Wop group The Electras with a new bridge and lyrics. For the release of the song through Marascalco's own labels Lola Records and Ruby-Doo Records the Electras members Gary Pipkin, Chester Pipkin and Brice Coefield were listed as songwriters in place of Nilsson and Marascalco.

== Reception ==
Neither the original nor the cover version of "All for the Beatles" charted. Alyn Shipton writes that the song "in itself [was] not particularly remarkable, but it [was] a harbinger for Nilsson's subsequent love of all things Beatles". The single and the film it was released with have become collectible items, for which prices of more than US$200 were paid in 2006.

Shipton wrote that it was ironic that "All for the Beatles" approached Beatlemania by adapting a Rolling Stones hit. "Borrowing unashamedly from it was calculated to put everyone who heard it in mind of the 'British Invasion'." Nilsson sang "in an Americanized approximation of John Lennon," but the main guitar solo was very similar to that of Keith Richards. Shipton concludes that the song is the first real example of Nilsson's preference for overdubbing, which he perfected during his career, to take-up with the close harmony of The Beatles.

The filmmaker John Scheinfeld used the song 2006 in his documentary Who Is Harry Nilsson (And Why Is Everybody Talkin’ About Him)?, when The Beatles were first mentioned.
