= Who Is Harry Nilsson (And Why Is Everybody Talkin' About Him)? =

Who is Harry Nilsson (And Why Is Everybody Talkin' About Him?)
- Theatrical poster
- Directed by: John Scheinfeld
- Written by: John Scheinfeld
- Produced by: Lee Blackman; John Scheinfeld; David Leaf
- Starring: Perry Botkin, Jr. Micky Dolenz; Terry Gilliam; Eric Idle; Ringo Starr; Robin Williams; Yoko Ono; Richard Perry; Randy Newman; John Lennon; May Pang; Brian Wilson
- Cinematography: James Mathers
- Edited by: Peter S. Lynch II
- Music by: Harry Nilsson
- Production company: LSL Productions
- Distributed by: Lorber Films
- Release dates: 2006 (Santa Barbara International Film Festival); 2010 (Theatrical)
- Running time: 116 minutes
- Country: United States
- Language: English

Who is Harry Nilsson (And Why Is Everybody Talkin' About Him?) is a documentary about the American musician Harry Nilsson that premiered at the Santa Barbara International Film Festival in 2006. It was released to theatres in September 2010 and on DVD in October that year.

== Production ==
The film's release had been long-awaited, such that friends of Nilsson began referring to it as "The Long and Winding Road". The film's producers eschewed the device of including present-day commentary from music critics or historians as a means of establishing Nilsson's legacy. Instead, David Leaf and John Scheinfeld interviewed close to three dozen of Nilsson's friends, colleagues and extended family, who all shared their memories of Harry Nilsson, his music, and how it affected them. This footage was put together in a documentary that follows Nilsson from childhood to his death in 1994, at the age of 52, recording the highs and lows of his life, from Grammy wins through divorce and substance abuse.

Among the interviewees are Perry Botkin, Jr., Micky Dolenz, Terry Gilliam, Mark Hudson, Eric Idle, Ray Cooper, Al Kooper, Randy Newman, Yoko Ono, May Pang, Van Dyke Parks, Richard Perry, Jimmy Webb, Paul Williams, Robin Williams, Brian Wilson and The Smothers Brothers. Also included are interviews with Nilsson's wives and children. Discussing the film in 2011, Scheinfeld agreed that one of the most notable absences was any input from Ringo Starr. Explaining the latter's non-appearance, Scheinfeld said that Nilsson was among the three people that Starr finds it difficult to talk about, along with John Lennon and George Harrison. Another notable absence in the film is arranger-composer George Tipton, who worked closely with Nilsson on nearly all of his early RCA recordings; they reportedly had an unexplained and permanent falling-out, and Tipton refused to be interviewed for the film.

== Reception ==
Writing in Entertainment Weekly, Stephen King said of the film: "Who Is Harry Nilsson is some piece of work, an exploration of the dark side of success that’s hard to watch, and even harder to forget." The film was nominated for Best Documentary Screenplay from the Writers Guild of America.

On review aggregator website Rotten Tomatoes, the film holds an approval rating of 85% based on 13 reviews, with an average rating of 7.0/10.
