= ROR (design company) =

ROR was a British interior design company founded by Robin Cruikshank and Ringo Starr.

The pair had met when Robin Ltd., Cruikshank's company, aligned itself with The Beatles' Apple Corps. Cruikshank designed furniture for Starr's new house, Round Hill on Compton Avenue in the Highgate district of north-west London.

The name of the company stands for Ringo or Robin. The company was incorporated in 1968 with its offices on the top floor of the Apple Corps headquarters at 3 Savile Row in the West End of London. Starr owned 51% of the company to Cruickshank's 49%. ROR's designs were placed on sale in the department stores of Harvey Nichols and Liberty of London. The company closed in the mid 1980s.

One piece designed by ROR was the grille of a Rolls-Royce car set into a stainless steel table. Starr had been inspired to create it after passing a car showroom near his house.

== Notable projects ==
- A $10 million contract to design the interior of the Mushrif Palace in Abu Dhabi, UAE.
- Seeb Palace, Oman.
- The penthouse flat of the pornographer and property developer Paul Raymond at Fitzhardinge House in Marylebone and his subsequent flat in Arlington House in Piccadilly. Paul Willetts, Raymond's biographer, describes ROR's work for the Arlington House apartment as "gilt and silver" with a beige marble floor with mirrors in the lobby, dining room, bathroom and cocktail bar. Mirrors were also placed on the ceiling above Raymond's "vast troilism-friendly" bed.
- The top floor flat of Harry Nilsson at 9 Curzon Place in Mayfair. The bathrooms featured two etched glass mirrors, one of an oak tree and the other of a hangman's noose. This disturbed Nilsson who asked for it to be replaced.
