= Early Tymes =

Demo album by Harry Nilsson
- Released: 1977, 1995, 2001
- Recorded: 1962
- Genre: Pop, rock
- Label: Musicor, Fuel, RPM
- Producer: Scott Turner

Harry Nilsson chronology
| Knnillssonn (1977) | Early Tymes (1977) | Flash Harry (1980) |

Early Tymes is a compilation album consisting of demos by Harry Nilsson who recorded for Scott Turner in 1962, when he was still a struggling musician, whose regular job was working in a bank. He was reportedly paid $5 per song to sing vocals to Turner's acoustic guitar. The demos were overdubbed by various studio musicians (including Leon Russell, Herb Alpert and Hal Blaine) in 1962, and then again were dubbed in 1977 and released on the album Early Tymes in 1977. The demos were then re-dubbed and released in 1994 as Nilsson '62: The Debut Sessions and contain previously unreleased demos. Hollywood Dreamer was released in 2001 without any of the overdubs, and contains the unreleased demos "Oh I Wonder" and "On Time".

Professional ratings
Review scores
| Source | Rating |
|---|---|
| Early Tymes: Allmusic | link |
| The Debut Sessions: Allmusic | link |
| Hollywood Dreamer: Allmusic | link |

== Early Tymes Track listing ==
1. "He Ain't Gonna Get My Girl" (Scott Turner) – 1:36
2. "It Just Ain't Right" (John Marascalco, Turner) – 2:48
3. "Please Mr. Music Man" (Audie Murphy, Turner) – 2:41
4. "Learning from You" (Marascalco, Turner) – 1:19
5. "The Will" (Turner, Kevin Young) – 2:40
6. "The Ash Grove" (Diane Lampert, Turner) – 1:42
7. "All for Your Love" (Peter Farrow, Lampert, Turner) – 1:35
8. "There's Gotta Be a Girl" (Marascalco, Turner) – 2:13
9. "Building Me Up" (Marascalco, Turner) – 2:46
10. "Foolish Clock" (Murphy, Turner) – 2:12
11. "Oh, I Wonder" (Marascalco, Turner) – 2:49

Nilsson '62: The Debut Sessions

== Nilsson '62: The Debut Sessions Track listing ==
1. "It Just Ain't Right" (Marascalco, Turner) – 2:48
2. "Learning from You" (Marascalco, Turner) – 1:19
3. "Thank Heaven for Kathy" (Nilsson, Turner) – 2:28
4. "My Girl" (Nilsson, Turner) – 1:59
5. "A Man and His Castle" (Turner) – 2:26
6. "My Baby's Coming Home" (Holly, Nilsson, Turner) – 1:29
7. "Once a Loser" (Turner) – 2:32
8. "Me Without You" (Turner) – 1:48
9. "Oh Caroline" (John Marascalco, Turner) – 1:55
10. "The Only Light" (Mitchell, Murphy, Turner) – 3:48
11. "Just Wait Till Summer Comes" (Alpert, Turner) – 2:03
12. "Please Mr. Music Man" (Murphy, Turner) – 2:41
13. "The Will" (Turner, Young) – 2:40
14. "He Ain't Gonna Get My Girl" (Turner) – 1:36
15. "All for Your Love" (Farrow, Lampert, Turner) – 1:35
16. "The Ash Grove" (Lampert, Turner) – 1:42
17. "Take This Heart" (Marascalco, Turner) – 1:29
18. "Foolish Clock" (Murphy, Turner) – 2:12
19. "There's Gotta Be a Girl" (Marascalco, Turner) – 2:13
20. "Building Me Up" (Marascalco, Turner) – 2:46
21. "On Time" (Turner) – 3:02
22. "Nilsson's Message to Scotty" (Nilsson) – 1:06

Hollywood Dreamer

== Hollywood Dreamer Track listing ==
1. "Oh Caroline" (Marascalco, Turner) – 1:55
2. "Just Wait Till Summer Comes" (Alpert, Turner) – 2:03
3. "It Just Ain't Right" (Marascalco, Turner) – 2:48
4. "The Will" (Turner, Young) – 2:40
5. "He Ain't Gonna Get My Girl" (Turner) – 1:36
6. "The Only Light" (Mitchell, Murphy, Turner) – 3:48
7. "Once a Loser" (Turner) – 2:32
8. "The Ash Grove" (Lampert, Turner) – 1:42
9. "Building Me Up" (Marascalco, Turner) – 2:46
10. "A Man and His Castle" (Turner) – 2:26
11. "All for Your Love" (Farrow, Lampert, Turner) – 1:35
12. "My Baby's Coming Home" (Holly, Nilsson, Turner) – 1:29
13. "Please Mr. Music Man" (Murphy, Turner) – 2:41
14. "Oh, I Wonder" (Marascalco, Turner) – 2:49
15. "Learning from You" (Marascalco, Turner) – 1:19
16. "Take This Heart" (Marascalco, Turner) – 1:29
17. "There's Gotta Be a Girl" (Marascalco, Turner) – 2:13
18. "Me Without You" (Turner) – 1:48
19. "My Girl" (Nilsson, Turner) – 1:59
20. "Thank Heaven for Kathy" (Nilsson, Turner) – 2:28
21. "Foolish Clock" (Murphy, Turner) – 2:12
22. "It Just Ain't Right" (Marascalco, Turner) – 2:50
23. "On Time" (Turner) – 3:02
24. "Nilsson's Message to Scotty" (Nilsson) – 1:06

== Personnel ==
=== Early Tymes ===
- Guitar: Johnny Christopher, Tom Owen, Scott Turner, Reggie Young
- Bass: Joe Osborn, Steve Schaeffer
- Keyboards: Randy Goodrum
- Drums: Buddy Harman, Karl Himmel
- Backing Vocals: The Wizard Of Ahs

=== Hollywood Dreamer ===
- Guitar: James Burton, Johnny Christopher, Troy Lancaster, Tom Owen, Scott Turner
- Bass: Steve Bryant, Joe Osborn, Steve Schaeffer
- Piano: Herb Alpert, Randy Goodrum, Leon Russell
- Drums: Hal Blaine, Karl Himmel
- Backing Vocals: Woody Wright
