= Skidoo (soundtrack) =

Soundtrack album by Harry Nilsson
- Released: 1968
- Genre: Pop
- Length: 31:14
- Label: RCA Victor
- Producer: Rick Jarrard

Harry Nilsson chronology
Aerial Ballet (1968)	Skidoo (1968)	Harry (1969)

Professional ratings
Review scores
Source	Rating
Allmusic	link

Skidoo is an album by Harry Nilsson. It is the original soundtrack recording of the 1968 Otto Preminger film Skidoo, arranged and conducted by George Tipton and released by RCA Records.

Track 1, "The Cast and Crew", was used at the close of the film, and consists of Nilsson putting the entire end credits (key grip, Paramount logo, and copyright notice and all) to music and singing them.

Preminger gave Nilsson a cameo role in the film as a prison guard. The album's liner notes are by radio disc jockey and voice artist Gary Owens.

== Track listing ==
All music and lyrics by Harry Nilsson.

1. "The Cast and Crew" (vocals: Harry Nilsson) – 3:55
2. "I Will Take You There" (vocals: Harry Nilsson) – 2:30
3. "SKIDOO"/"Commercials" – 1:23
4. "Goodnight Mr. Banks"/"Let's Get the Hardware"/"Murder in the Car Wash" – 2:45
5. "Angie's Suite" – 4:20
6. "The Tree" – 2:49
7. "Garbage Can Ballet" (vocals: Harry Nilsson) – 2:00
8. "Tony's Trip" – 4:19
9. "Escape:Impossible"/"Green Bay Packers March" – 3:38
10. "Man Wasn't Meant to Fly" – 2:12
11. "Escape:Possible" – 2:15
12. "SKIDOO" (vocals: Carol Channing)/"Goodnight Mr. Banks" – 4:08
