= A Little Touch of Schmilsson in the Night =

1973 album of classic 20th-century standards sung by Harry Nilsson

Studio album by Nilsson
- Released: June 1973
- Recorded: March 15–22, 1973
- Studios: CTS Studios, Wembley, England; RCA Recording Studios, New York, New York
- Genres: Traditional pop; orchestral pop
- Length: 36:04
- Label: RCA Victor
- Producer: Derek Taylor

Nilsson chronology
Son of Schmilsson (1972)	A Little Touch of Schmilsson in the Night (1973)	Son of Dracula (1974)

Singles from A Little Touch of Schmilsson in the Night
- 1. ""As Time Goes By" / "Lullaby in Ragtime"" Released: August 1973

Professional ratings
Review scores
Source	Rating
AllMusic	3.5/5 stars
The Austin Chronicle	3/5 stars
Christgau's Record Guide	C−
The Essential Rock Discography	5/10
MusicHound	3.5/5
Pitchfork Media	4.7/10
PopMatters	5/10 stars
The Rolling Stone Album Guide	2/5 stars

A Little Touch of Schmilsson in the Night is a 1973 album of classic 20th-century standards sung by American singer Harry Nilsson. The album was arranged by Frank Sinatra's arranger Gordon Jenkins, and produced by Derek Taylor. This album is notable in being a standards album produced a decade before such works started to become popular again.

== Music and lyrics ==
The album came about from a game Nilsson and Taylor would play, challenging each other to identify the composers of obscure songs. Richard Perry, producer of Nilsson's two previous projects (Nilsson Schmilsson and Son of Schmilsson), was unenthusiastic about the singer's plans for a traditional pop album, especially given the critical and commercial underperformance of the latter compared to the success of the former. He recalled years later: "The timing couldn't have been worse for him to do a god-damned standards album...[it] was career suicide. He had the rest of his life to do an album like that, when it would have been more meaningful.". He would have no involvement in the project.

The Gordon Jenkins arrangements incorporate interpolations of other standards in the collection as transitions between songs. The lyrics were sometimes altered from the most popular versions with alternate lyrics or occasional additions, changes that are referred to in the original liner notes. "It Had to Be You" features a joke ending written by original songwriter Gus Kahn that finishes with the unusual lyrics "It had to be me/ Unlucky me/ It had to be you."

Nilsson himself was exceedingly happy with the album, calling it "...God-like, the best album I've ever been associated with." He also believed he made Touch at the last possible time his voice was suitable for such a project, saying in a 1988 interview with Bruce Jenkins "...Hell, I'm a baritone now. I was hoping to get hoarse like Ray Charles, because that choir-boy thing is gone. I knew it then. I told both Derek and Gordon, this is the last of it. That incredible, flexible, rubber-band-like voice - I just barely snuck in that album under the gun."

== Packaging and title ==
The title is an allusion to Shakespeare's Henry V, Act 4, in which the Chorus refers to Henry's nocturnal visit to his troops as "Behold, as may unworthiness define, a little touch of Harry in the night". The title came about when Taylor remembered the quote as the album was being recorded at Wembley Studios. Nilsson's friend Stanley Dorfman, who was present watching the album recording in progress, suggested they substitute “Schmilsson” for “Harry,” referring to Nilsson's colloquial nickname from his previous two albums, Nilsson Schmilsson (1971) and Son of Schmilsson (1972). A few days later, Dorfman went on to direct and produce the BBC TV special also named A Little Touch of Schmilsson in the Night.

A Little Touch of Schmilsson in the Night was dedicated to Frank Wills, the security guard who discovered the Watergate break-in. On the cover photograph, shot by Tom Hanley (known for his black and white shots of The Beatles), Nilsson is wearing lapel buttons depicting Wills and the singer's son Zak. The flame extending from Nilsson's thumb is a direct reference to a gag performed by Stan Laurel in the 1937 Laurel and Hardy film Way Out West.

The back cover of the original gatefold edition features track-by-track commentary on the songs penned by Nilsson and producer Derek Taylor.

== Track listing ==
No.	Title	Writer(s)	Length
1.	"Lazy Moon"	Bob Cole, J. Rosamond Johnson	3:20
2.	"For Me and My Gal"	Edgar Leslie, E. Ray Goetz, George W. Meyer	2:47
3.	"It Had to Be You"	Isham Jones, Gus Kahn	2:45
4.	"Always"	Irving Berlin	1:34
5.	"Makin' Whoopee!"	Kahn, Walter Donaldson	4:25
6.	"You Made Me Love You"	Joseph McCarthy, James V. Monaco	2:32
7.	"Lullaby in Ragtime"	Sylvia Fine	3:39
8.	"I Wonder Who's Kissing Her Now"	Joe Howard, Harold Orlob, Frank R. Adams, Will M. Hough	2:40
9.	"What'll I Do"	Berlin	2:25
10.	"Nevertheless (I'm In Love with You)"	Bert Kalmar, Harry Ruby	2:38
11.	"This Is All I Ask"	Gordon Jenkins	3:35
12.	"As Time Goes By"	Herman Hupfeld	3:21

== A Little Touch Of Schmilsson In The Night (television special) ==
In March 1973, days after Nilsson and Gordon Jenkins recorded the album at Wembley Studios, he recreated the experience with a live orchestra for a BBC television special by the same name. Known as a "singer-composer who is heard but not seen", Nilsson had appeared only for a few moments once on television in England, and once in America.A Little Touch Of Schmilsson In The Night was Nilsson’s second full-length collaboration with director and producer Stanley Dorfman. With exception to his appearance on an episode of the BBC series In Concert, also directed by Dorfman, the TV special was Nilsson's only televised full-length concert. It was filmed in one take at BBC Television Theatre, with Nilsson sitting in the middle of an orchestra, as opposed to being in a booth. The television special was broadcast by the BBC to coincide with the release of the album that fall.

== A Touch More Schmilsson In The Night ==
A Touch More Schmilsson in the Night

Compilation album by Harry Nilsson
- Released: 1988
- Recorded: March 1973
- Genres: Traditional pop; orchestral pop
- Length: 35:21
- Label: RCA Victor
- Producer: Derek Taylor
- Compiler: Rob Burt

In 1988, RCA released A Touch More Schmilsson in the Night, containing 6 previously unreleased songs, and 4 alternative takes from the original recording sessions. It also includes 2 songs from the 1977 album Knnillssonn. The album was met with a small release, was primarily only released in Germany, and did not meet markets outside of Europe until 1995 when it was released on CD in Japan. The cover art was based on Frank Sinatra's album cover art from In the Wee Small Hours.

== Charts ==
Chart (1973)	Peak position
Australia (Kent Music Report)	19
US Top LPs (Billboard)	46

== Personnel ==
- Harry Nilsson – "The Singer"
- Derek Taylor - producer
- Judd Proctor – guitar
- Charlie LaVere – piano
- Ken Dryden – flute
- David Snell – harp
- Derek Taylor, Jim Brown, Jim Buck – French horn
- Bill Povey, Bob Burns, Jock Sutcliffe, Martin Gatt, Roy Willox – woodwind
- Alan Dalziel, Ben Thomas, Bram Martin, Brian Hawkins, Derek Jacobs, Eric Eaden, Francisco Gabarró, Frank Clarke, Fred Parrington, Gwyn Edwards, Harry Danks, Jack Mandel, Jack Rothstein, John Sharpe, John Underwood, Julian Gaillard, Laurie Lewis, Leo Birnbaum, Lou Sofier, Max Salpeter, Peter Benson, Peter Halling, Sidney Margo, Ted Bryett, Trevor Williams, William Armon – strings
- Gordon Jenkins – arranger, conductor
- Jack Mandel – music contractor

Technical

- Martin Wyatt – associate producer
- Chrissie Hayes – assistant producer
- Phil McDonald – engineer
- Tom Hanley – cover photography
