= Aerial Ballet =

Studio album by Nilsson
- Released: July 1968
- Recorded: September 1967 – March 1968
- Studio: RCA Victor (Hollywood, California)
- Genre: Soft rock; folk-pop; pop rock; baroque pop; orchestral pop; chamber pop
- Length: 29:02
- Label: RCA Victor
- Producer: Rick Jarrard

Nilsson chronology
Pandemonium Shadow Show (1967)	Aerial Ballet (1968)	Skidoo (1968)

Singles from Aerial Ballet
- 1. "One" Released: 1968; 2. "Everybody's Talkin'" Released: August 1969

1980 Pickwick reissue cover

Professional ratings
Review scores
Source	Rating
AllMusic	4.5/5 stars
The Essential Rock Discography	6/10
Rolling Stone	(mixed)

Aerial Ballet is the third studio album by American musician Harry Nilsson, released in July 1968.

== Overview ==
Aerial Ballet was Nilsson's second album for RCA Victor, and was titled after the highwire circus act of his grandparents. It consists almost entirely of songs written by him, including "One", which later became a number five hit for Three Dog Night. The title of the album has been cited by Joey Kramer as the inspiration for Aerosmith's name.

The most familiar track from Aerial Ballet is its one cover song, Fred Neil's "Everybody's Talkin'". It was released as a single in North America in 1968, and reached the top forty in Canada—but initially flopped in the US. However, the song was subsequently selected for use in the Oscar-winning film Midnight Cowboy and became one of Nilsson's biggest hits as a performer, hitting the US top ten in 1969.

The original opening number for Aerial Ballet was "Daddy's Song", but this track was removed (apparently without Nilsson's awareness) after the first copies were issued, because The Monkees had recorded a cover version to be featured in their film Head, and had paid $35,000 for exclusive rights to the song. Recent reissues restore "Daddy's Song" (with the Monkees' contract long expired) to its rightful place in the lineup.

When Nilsson visited the Beatles in London during 1968, John Lennon played Nilsson "Revolution" and selections from the then-upcoming White Album. Nilsson, in turn, played to Lennon (who had spent thirty-six hours listening to Nilsson's previous album, Pandemonium Shadow Show) a demo cut of Aerial Ballet.

The album was reissued in 1980 on Pickwick Records (ACL-7075) with a different cover. The new art featured a biplane in a field, with the pilot standing in the foreground smoking a cigarette in a holder. The release had a printed stamp in the upper right corner announcing "Grammy Award Winner, Best Contemporary Male Vocalist, Everybody's Talkin'". The tracklist also changed, with both "Daddy's Song" and "Bath" being removed.

== Track listing ==
All tracks are written by Harry Nilsson, except where noted.

Side one
No.	Title	Length
1.	"Daddy's Song*"	2:41
2.	"Good Old Desk"	2:22
3.	"Don't Leave Me"	2:18
4.	"Mr. Richland's Favorite Song"	2:12
5.	"Little Cowboy"	1:22
6.	"Together"	2:08

Side two
No.	Title	Writer(s)	Length
7.	"Everybody's Talkin'"	Fred Neil	2:41
8.	"I Said Goodbye to Me"		2:13
9.	"Little Cowboy (Reprise)"		0:52
10.	"Mr. Tinker"		2:41
11.	"One"		2:50
12.	"The Wailing of the Willow"	Harry Nilsson, Ian Freebairn-Smith	2:00
13.	"Bath"		2:24

Bonus Tracks
No.	Title	Length
14.	"Sister Marie"	3:01
15.	"Miss Butter's Lament"	2:20
16.	"Girlfriend"	1:50

- excluded from initial British copies

== Personnel ==
Credits per Allmusic:

- Harry Nilsson – vocals
- Dennis Budimir – guitar
- Al Casey – guitar
- Michael Melvoin – harpsichord, organ, piano
- Larry Knechtel – bass, piano
- Lyle Ritz – bass
- Jim Gordon – drums
- Milt Holland – bells, mallets, tabla, timpani
- Carroll Lewis – trumpet, flugelhorn
- Ollie Mitchell – trumpet
- Anthony Terran – trumpet, flugelhorn
- Robert Enevoldsen – baritone horn, trombone
- Dick Hyde – baritone horn, bass trombone
- Robert Knight – baritone horn, bass trombone
- Richard Taylor "Dick" Nash – baritone horn, trombone
- George Roberts – baritone horn
- David Duke – French horn, tuba
- James R. Horn – flute
- Bob Hardaway – woodwinds
- Plas Johnson – woodwinds
- John Lowe – woodwinds
- John Rotella – woodwinds
- Leonard Atkins – violin
- Arnold Belnick – violin
- James Getzoff – violin
- Alfred Lustgarten – violin
- Leonard Malarsky – violin
- Wilbert Nuttycombe – violin
- Jerome Reisler – violin
- Charlotte Soy – violin
- Darrel Terwilliger – violin
- William Weiss – violin
- Tibor Zelig – violin
- Jesse Ehrlich – cello
- Ray Kelly – cello
- Jacqueline Lustgarten – cello

Production and technical personnel

- George Tipton – arrangements
- Rick Jarrard – producer
- Brian Christian – engineer
- Grover Helsley – engineer
- Allen Zentz – engineer
- Hank McGill – engineer
- Pat Ieraci – technician
- Dick Hendler – artwork, cover illustration
