= Nilsson Sings Newman =

Studio album by Nilsson
- Released: February 1970
- Recorded: August–October 1969
- Studio: RCA's Music Center of the World (Hollywood); Wally Heider (San Francisco)
- Genre: Chamber pop
- Length: 25:17
- Label: RCA Victor
- Producer: Harry Nilsson

Nilsson chronology
Harry (1969)	Nilsson Sings Newman (1970)	The Point! (1970)

Singles from Nilsson Sings Newman
- 1. "I'll Be Home" / "Waiting" Released: March 1970; 2. "Caroline" / "Yellow Man" Released: May 1970

Nilsson Sings Newman is the fifth album by American singer-songwriter Harry Nilsson, released in February 1970 on RCA Victor. It features songs written by Randy Newman. Recorded over six weeks in late 1969, the album showcases Nilsson's voice multi-tracked in layers of tone and harmony. Its arrangements are otherwise sparse, with most of the instrumentation provided by Newman on piano. The record was not a great commercial success, but won a 1970 "Record of the Year" award from Stereo Review magazine. The LP record cover art was illustrated by Dean Torrence.

== Background ==
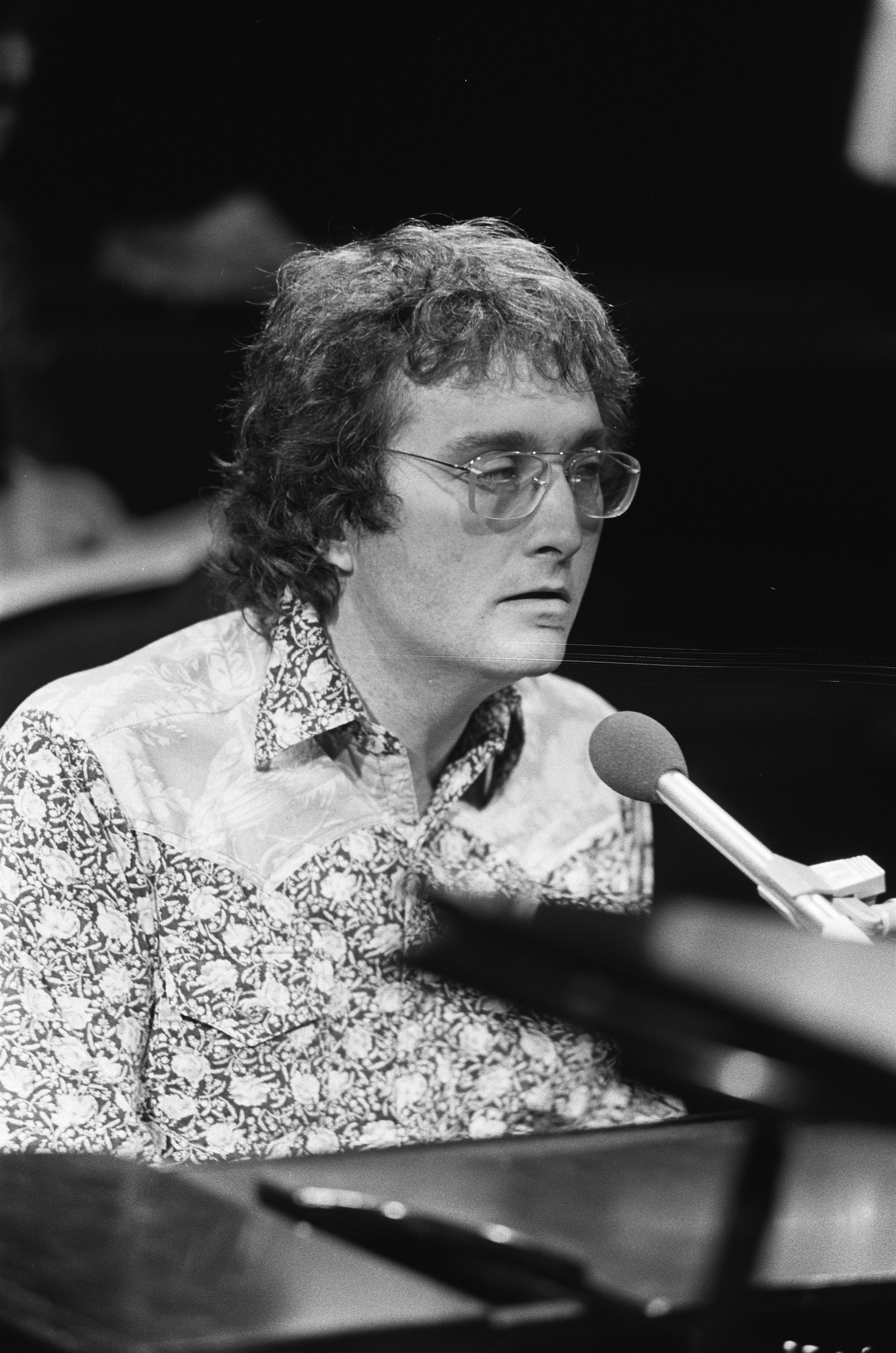
Randy Newman in 1975

In 1968, Ricky Nelson released his concept album Perspective, a move to expand his musical horizons. The album included songs by Newman, Nilsson and others woven together to tell the story of the interactions of a famous family; author Kevin Courrier writes that this album may have been part of the inspiration for Nilsson Sings Newman.

In August 1969, Nilsson released his fourth album Harry. It ended with one of Newman's songs: "Simon Smith and the Amazing Dancing Bear". Years later, Nilsson told Paul Zollo that he was in awe of Newman writing so many songs, ones he thought were better than his own.

== Recording ==
On August 20, 1969, Nilsson and Newman began to record what would become Nilsson Sings Newman. After basic tracks were laid down, Nilsson spent six weeks overdubbing his voice to create layers and harmonies, line by line. As many as 118 overdubs were laid down for a single song. Nilsson occasionally broke the fourth wall in his performance. His voice in the control room is heard on several songs, instructing the recording engineer to add more echo or remove a voice. On the album's final song "So Long Dad", amid a multi-Nilsson chorus of voices, Nilsson softly asks for "more first voice." Louder, he counters himself by saying "actually I need more current voice. Forget the one that's saying 'more first voice.'"

Besides piano, other instruments were sometimes used in the studio, including bass drum, tambourine and various electronic keyboards. On the song "Cowboy", Nilsson used electronic harpsichord to bring in a different concluding theme, quoting John Barry's theme from the film Midnight Cowboy, an inside joke that referenced Fred Neil's "Everybody's Talkin'" from the same film, a major success for Nilsson earlier that year. A number of alternate takes and songs were recorded but left off the 1970 album. Two such songs were "Snow" and "Linda". Newman wrote one song specifically for the album: "Caroline", a straightforward love song.

According to Nilsson, Newman was "tired of the album when we were finished making it. ... For him it was just doing piano and voice ... over and over." He explained that "once I got the take down, I knew what I was going to do with it later. He didn't." Newman said of his experience that he "was honored that a writer with Harry's talent would choose to do an album of someone else's songs. ... he was such a great singer, a virtuoso singer, really, and he could do so many things as a vocalist that I couldn't do—like hold a note."

== Release ==
In February 1970, Nilsson Sings Newman was released by RCA Records. The cover art was drawn by Dean Torrence; his sepia tone scene depicted Nilsson driving an old American car through the countryside with Newman in the back seat. (The automobile depicted is a 1938 Graham-Paige). Sales of the album were underwhelming. Courrier speculates that this was possibly because of the "idiosyncratic quality" of its ballads and the paucity of reviews. Newman said in an interview how he personally went to assess the sales of the album at a record store in Los Angeles. He asked a clerk (who did not recognize him) "do you have any Nilsson albums?" The clerk guided Newman through each one, describing its sales and whether he recommended it; he came to Nilsson Sings Newman and said, "this is the one that nearly finished him off."

Writing for The Village Voice, Robert Christgau awarded the album a B+ and wrote: "For those benighted who still believe the original can't sing, here's a sweeter version, including appropriately lovely versions of two rare urban celebrations—'Vine Street' ... and 'Dayton, Ohio 1903.' Not so dynamic musically, though—just Nilsson singing, and Newman behind on piano." The audio equipment and record review magazine Stereo Review named Nilsson Sings Newman their album of the year. The weekly magazine Cue in New York praised the artistry saying that "Nilsson was dealing with material as powerful as his own, but was free to concentrate entirely on his gifts as a performer." Cue said that the album was free of the "overwhelmingly complex" personal expressions that came earlier from "Nilsson singing Nilsson, and Newman singing Newman".

== Legacy ==
Retrospective professional ratings
Review scores
Source	Rating
AllMusic	4.5/5 stars
Christgau's Record Guide	B+
The Essential Rock Discography	7/10

Here Comes Inspiration, a 1974 album by Paul Williams, begins with a 54-second track called "Nilsson Sings Newman".

In 1993, Newman prepared to record an entire album of Nilsson songs, a returning of the favor 25 years later. Newman had never before recorded a Nilsson song. After Nilsson's death in January 1994, the intended homage became a memorial, titled For The Love of Harry: Everybody Sings Nilsson. To leave room for participation by other artists, Newman sang only one song, "Remember (Christmas)", a sad and dreamy tune which opened the album. Newman said, "I just hope Harry knew how great he was. He was always putting himself down, making fun of himself."

Nilsson Sings Newman was re-released as a CD in 1995. In 2000, the 30th anniversary release was padded with five additional tracks. One was "Snow", unreleased in 1970 for lack of room on the LP, and four were alternate versions of songs that were on the original album. In 2000, Ben Wener of the Orange County Register wrote that "Newman's sly, dramatically structured impressionistic pop was ideally suited for Nilsson's theatrical tone ... It's not so much that Nilsson's takes are better than Newman's ... just refreshingly different—less wicked and vicious, more melancholy."

Artists who have expressed a fondness for the album include Rufus Wainwright, Joanna Newsom, Ron Sexsmith, Jellyfish, Adrian Belew, and Shane Tutmarc. AllMusic wrote of Nilsson Sings Newman as "a subtle, graceful masterpiece where the pleasure is in the grace notes, small gestures, and in-jokes," and that once a listener has acquired a taste for Newman's idiosyncratic songs, "is as sweet as honey."

The 2021 Weezer album OK Human was influenced by Nilsson Sings Newman.

== Track listing ==
All tracks are written by Randy Newman.

Side one
No.	Title	Length
1.	"Vine St."	2:50
2.	"Love Story"	3:39
3.	"Yellow Man"	2:16
4.	"Caroline"	2:05
5.	"Cowboy"	2:48

Side two
No.	Title	Length
1.	"The Beehive State"	2:04
2.	"I'll Be Home"	2:35
3.	"Living Without You"	2:35
4.	"Dayton, Ohio 1903"	1:50
5.	"So Long Dad"	2:35

BMG's 2000 CD reissue bonus tracks
No.	Title	Length
1.	"Snow"	2:29
2.	"Love Story" (alternate take)	3:24
3.	"Cowboy" (alternate take)	2:22
4.	"I'll Be Home" (alternate take)	2:41
5.	"Living Without You" (alternate take)	2:40

== Personnel ==
- Harry Nilsson – vocals, additional instruments
- Randy Newman – piano, electronic keyboards

The credits give "special thanks to George Tipton and Lenny Waronker".
