= George Tipton =

American composer (1932–2016)

- Born: George Aliceson Tipton; January 23, 1932; United States
- Died: February 12, 2016 (aged 84); Monterey, California, U.S.
- Occupations: Composer, musical arranger, conductor
- Known for: Composing

George Aliceson Tipton (January 23, 1932 – February 12, 2016) was an American television and pop record-industry composer, musical arranger, and conductor, who is well known for his television theme music and his arrangements for singer-songwriter Harry Nilsson.

Among Tipton's works are the theme music for the TV shows Soap and its spinoff Benson, It's a Living, I'm a Big Girl Now, and Empty Nest, plus incidental music for numerous shows, including The Courtship of Eddie's Father, Soap, Mulligan's Stew, The Love Boat, Heartland, The Golden Girls, and The Golden Palace. He also wrote the score for the film Badlands (1973), and for the television films Home for the Holidays (1972), The Affair (1973), The Stranger Who Looks Like Me (1974), The Gun and the Pulpit (1974), Hit Lady (1974), Griffin and Phoenix (1976), Red Alert (1977), The Gift (1979), Christmas Lilies of the Field (1979) and Gidget's Summer Reunion (1985).

His arranging and conducting credits include numerous hits by Jan and Dean, The Sunshine Company, and Jose Feliciano's hit version of "Light My Fire" by The Doors. He was one of the main arrangers on the albums of Leonard Nimoy during the late 1960s. Tipton is arguably best known in the pop-rock field for his work as an arranger on singles and albums recorded by singer-songwriter Harry Nilsson during the most productive phase of his career in the 1960s and early 1970s. They met c. 1964 through music publisher Perry Botkin Jr., where Tipton worked as a copyist. Their collaboration began when Tipton put up his life's savings ($2,500) to arrange and record four Nilsson tracks which they sold to Tower, a sub-label of Capitol Records. These tracks were subsequently included on the Spotlight on Nilsson LP.

Tipton arranged Nilsson's acclaimed early albums for RCA Records (1967–71): the Skidoo soundtrack, music for the TV series The Courtship of Eddie's Father, and for the animated feature The Point!. Tipton also arranged Nilsson's classic single "Everybody's Talkin'," which won a Grammy Award in 1969. In 1970, Tipton recorded an album of instrumental interpretations of Nilsson's music, Nilsson by Tipton (Warner Bros. Records), which featured cover illustrations by Dean Torrence.

Tipton and Nilsson subsequently had an unexplained falling-out, and Tipton reportedly refused to be involved in the 2010 documentary on Nilsson's life and career.

Tipton was nominated for the Academy Award for Best Music, Scoring Original Song Score and/or Adaptation for his musical collaboration with Paul Williams on the 1974 Brian De Palma horror-comedy rock opera film Phantom of the Paradise.

Tipton died in 2016 at age 84.
