= Harry Nilsson =

American singer-songwriter (1941–1994)

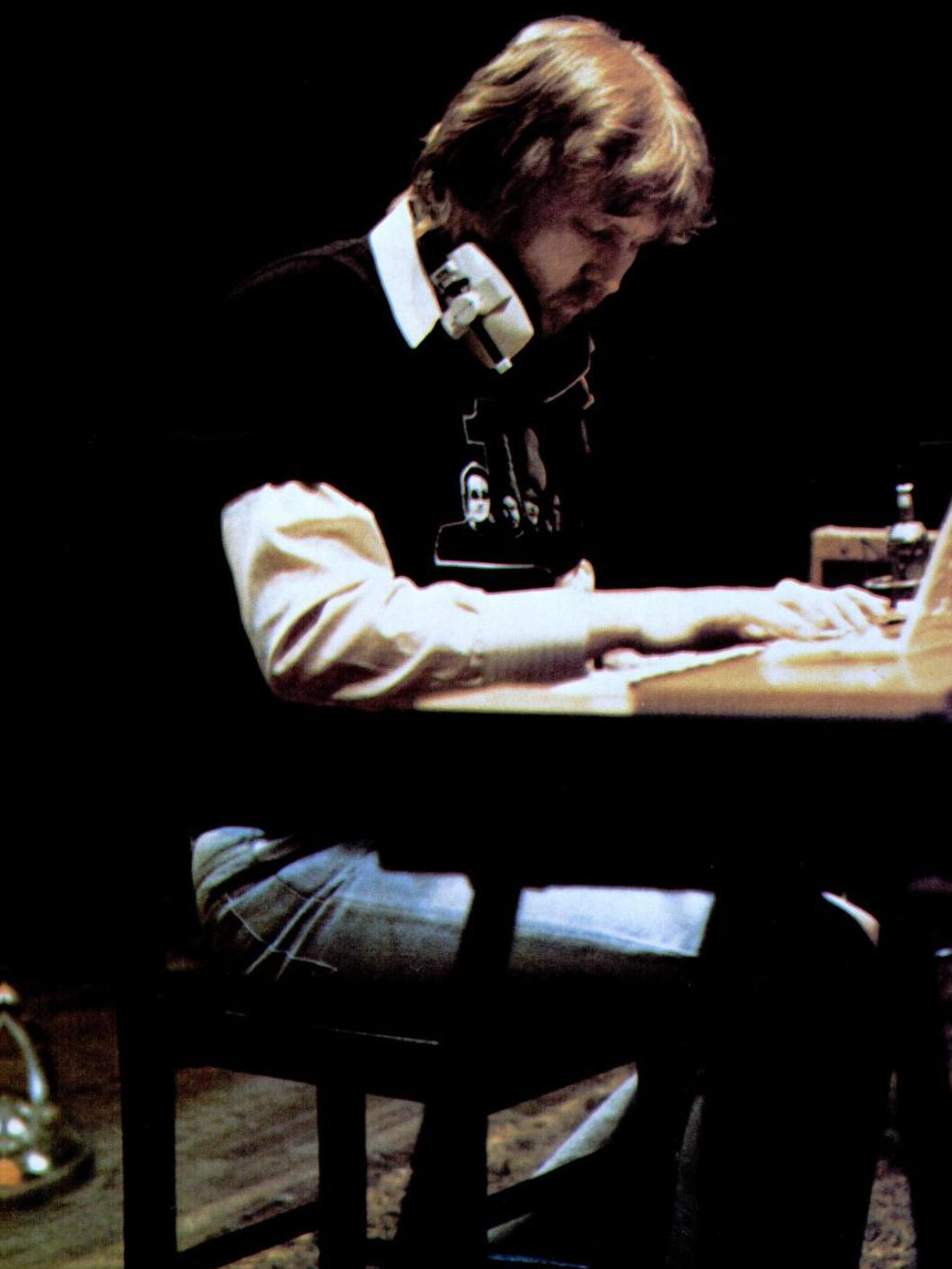
- Nilsson in 1974

Background information
- Also known as: Nilsson
- Born: Harold Edward Nilsson III; June 15, 1941; Brooklyn, New York City, U.S.
- Origin: Los Angeles, California, U.S.
- Died: January 15, 1994 (aged 52) Agoura Hills, California, U.S.
- Genres: Rock; pop
- Occupation: Singer-songwriter
- Instruments: Vocals; keyboards; guitar
- Works: Discography
- Years active: 1958–1992
- Labels: Tower; Musicor; RCA; Mercury/PolyGram
- Spouses: Sandra McTaggart (m. 1964; div. 1966); Diane Clatworthy (m. 1969; div. 1974); Una O'Keeffe (m. 1976)
- Website: harrynilsson.com

Harold Edward Nilsson III (June 15, 1941 – January 15, 1994), usually credited as Harry Nilsson, sometimes credited as Nilsson, was an American singer and songwriter known for his versatile tenor range, pioneering use of vocal overdubbing, explorations of the Great American Songbook, and Caribbean fusion sounds. He was one of the few major pop-rock artists to achieve significant commercial success without touring or performing large-scale public concerts.

Born in Brooklyn, Nilsson moved to Los Angeles as a teenager to escape his family's poor financial situation and, starting in 1962, pursued songwriting while working as a computer programmer at a bank. He debuted on RCA Victor with the 1967 album Pandemonium Shadow Show, which began a creative partnership with arranger George Tipton that lasted until 1971. His albums over this period included Nilsson Sings Newman, a collaboration with Randy Newman, and The Point!, an original children's story. Between 1968 and 1974, nine of his singles reached the U.S. or UK top 40, including the top 10 hits "Everybody's Talkin'", "Without You", and "Coconut"; other artists enjoyed success with his songs "One" and "The Puppy Song". His albums Nilsson Schmilsson and Son of Schmilsson, produced under Richard Perry, were certified gold by the RIAA, indicating over 500,000 units sold each.

In the early to mid-1970s, Nilsson was affected by periods of substance abuse and erratic behavior; his voice degraded markedly after A Little Touch of Schmilsson in the Night, which preceded the popular trend of standards albums by a decade. Sometimes called "the American Beatle", he formed close friendships with John Lennon, who produced his album Pussy Cats, and Ringo Starr, together sharing a core studio ensemble, record appearances, and membership in the Hollywood Vampires drinking club. His recording output diminished following his final RCA album, Knnillssonn and, after providing songs to the musical film Popeye, he increasingly referred to himself as "a retired musician". Responding to Lennon's 1980 murder, he focused on gun control activism and subsequently recorded sporadically. He died of heart failure in 1994 before he was able to finish his last album, Papa's Got a Brown New Robe.

Nilsson received two Grammy Awards (for "Everybody's Talkin'" and "Without You") and was voted number 62 in Rolling Stone's 2015 list of the "100 Greatest Songwriters of All Time", where he was described as "a pioneer of the Los Angeles studio sound" and "a crucial bridge" between 1960s psychedelia and the 1970s singer-songwriter era. He is credited with creating the first remix album (Aerial Pandemonium Ballet) and mashup song ("You Can't Do That"), as well as influencing a movement of indie rock musicians through his songwriting and the defiant attitude he projected. His songs have featured prominently in many film and television soundtracks since the 1990s.

== Early life ==
Nilsson was born on June 15, 1941, in the Bedford–Stuyvesant neighborhood of Brooklyn in New York City. His paternal great-grandfather, a Swede who later immigrated to, and became naturalized in, the United States, created an act known as an "aerial ballet" (which is the title of one of Nilsson's albums).

His mother, Elizabeth (née Martin) Nilsson, was known as "Bette" to the family. She was born in 1920 in New York to Charles Augustus Martin and Florence Madeline (née Stotz) Martin. Bette had a brother, John, and a sister, Mary. Her parents were the cornerstones of her son's young life. While his maternal grandmother played piano, his maternal grandfather, Charlie Martin, supported the family in a tiny railroad apartment on Jefferson Avenue in Brooklyn. His father, Harry Edward Nilsson Jr., abandoned the family when Nilsson was three years old. An autobiographical reference to this is found in the opening to Nilsson's song "1941":

Well, in 1941, a happy father had a son.
And by 1944, the father walked right out the door

Nilsson's "Daddy's Song" also refers to this period in Nilsson's childhood. He grew up with his mother and a younger half-sister. His younger brother, Drake Nilsson, was left with friends during their moves between Southern California and New York, sometimes living with a succession of relatives and his stepfather. His uncle, a mechanic in San Bernardino, California, helped Nilsson improve his vocal and musical abilities. In addition to his brother and a half-sister through his mother, he also had three half-sisters and one half-brother through his father.

Due to his family's poverty, Nilsson worked from an early age, including a job at the Paramount Theatre in Los Angeles. When the cinema closed in 1960, he applied for a job at a bank, falsely claiming on his application that he was a high school graduate (he had completed only through ninth grade). He had an aptitude for computers, which were starting to be used at banks at the time. He later performed so well in his role that the bank retained him even after they discovered he had lied about his education. He worked on bank computers at night and, in the daytime, pursued his songwriting and singing careers.

== Career ==
=== 1962–1966: Musicianship beginnings ===
By 1958, Nilsson followed popular music, especially rhythm and blues artists like Ray Charles. He had performed while he was working at the Paramount, forming a vocal duo with his friend Jerry Smith and singing close harmonies in the style of the Everly Brothers. The manager of a hangout Nilsson frequented gave him a plastic ukulele, which he learned to play, and he later learned to play the guitar and piano. In the 2006 documentary Who Is Harry Nilsson (And Why Is Everybody Talkin' About Him)?, Nilsson recalled that when he could not remember lyrics or parts of the melodies to popular songs, he created his own, which led to writing original songs.

His uncle's singing lessons, along with Nilsson's natural talent, helped him when he got a job singing demos for songwriter Scott Turner in 1962. Turner paid Nilsson five dollars for each track they recorded. (When Nilsson became famous, Turner decided to release these early recordings, and contacted Nilsson to work out a fair payment. Nilsson replied that he had already been paid – five dollars a track.)

In 1963, Nilsson had some early success as a songwriter, working with John Marascalco on a song for Little Richard. Upon hearing Nilsson sing, Little Richard reportedly remarked: "My! You sing good for a white boy!" Marascalco also financed some independent singles by Nilsson. One, "Baa Baa Blacksheep", was released under the pseudonym "Bo Pete" to some small local airplay. Another recording, "Donna, I Understand", convinced Mercury Records to offer Nilsson a contract, and release recordings by him under the name "Johnny Niles".

By 1964, Nilsson worked with Phil Spector, writing three songs with him. He also established a relationship with songwriter and publisher Perry Botkin Jr., who began to find a market for Nilsson's songs. Botkin also gave Nilsson a key to his office, providing another place to write after hours.

Through his association with Botkin, Nilsson met and became friends with musician, composer and arranger George Tipton, who at the time was working for Botkin as a music copyist. In 1964, Tipton invested his life savings – $2,500 – to finance the recording of four Nilsson songs, which he also arranged. They were able to sell the completed recordings to the Tower label, a recently established subsidiary of Capitol Records, and the tracks were subsequently included on Nilsson's debut album. The fruitful association between Nilsson and Tipton continued after Nilsson signed with RCA Victor. Tipton went on to create the arrangements for nearly all of Nilsson's RCA recordings between 1967 and 1971, but their association ended in the 1970s when the two fell out for unknown reasons.

Nilsson's recording contract was picked up by Tower Records, which in 1966 released the first singles actually credited to him by name, as well as the debut album Spotlight on Nilsson. None of Nilsson's Tower releases charted or gained much critical attention, although his songs were being recorded by Glen Campbell, Fred Astaire, The Shangri-Las, The Yardbirds, and others. Despite his growing success, Nilsson remained on the night shift at the bank.

=== 1967–1968: Signing with RCA Victor ===
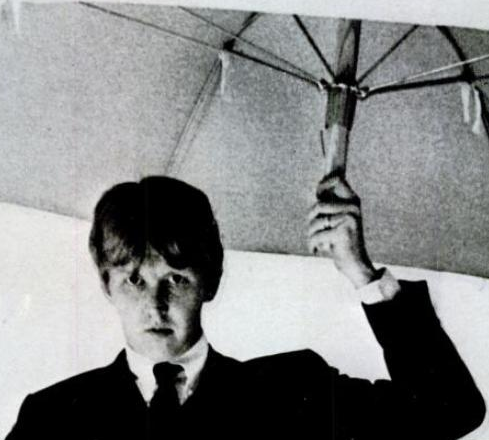
Nilsson in 1967

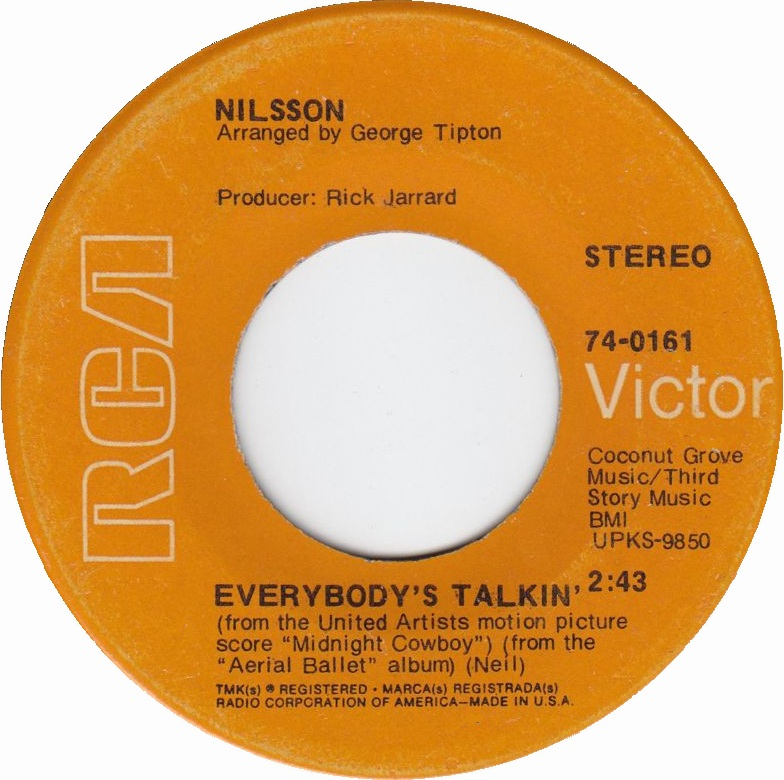
"Everybody's Talkin'" US vinyl 1969

Nilsson signed with RCA Victor in 1966 and released an album the following year, Pandemonium Shadow Show, which was a critical success. Music industry insiders were impressed both with the songwriting and with Nilsson's pure-toned, multi-octave vocals. One such insider was Beatles press officer Derek Taylor, who bought an entire box of copies of the album to share this new sound with others. With a major-label release, and continued songwriting success, most notably with the Monkees, who recorded Nilsson's "Cuddly Toy" after meeting him through their producer Chip Douglas, Nilsson finally felt secure enough in the music business to quit his job with the bank. Monkees member Micky Dolenz maintained a close friendship until Nilsson's death in 1994.

Some of the albums from Derek Taylor's box eventually ended up with the Beatles themselves, who quickly became Nilsson fans. This may have been helped by the track "You Can't Do That", in which Nilsson covered the John Lennon penned tune – and also worked references to 17 other Beatles tunes in the mix, usually by quoting snippets of Beatles lyrics in the multi-layered backing vocals. When John Lennon and Paul McCartney held a press conference in 1968 to announce the formation of the Apple Corps, Lennon was asked to name his favorite American artist. He replied, "Nilsson". McCartney was then asked to name his favorite American group. He replied, "Nilsson".

"You Can't Do That" was Nilsson's first hit as a performer; though it stalled at No. 122 on the US charts, it hit the top 10 in Canada.

When RCA had asked if there was anything special he wanted as a signing premium, Nilsson asked for his own office at RCA, being used to working out of one. In the weeks after the Beatles' Apple press conference, Nilsson's office phone began ringing constantly, with offers and requests for interviews and inquiries about his performing schedule. Nilsson usually answered the calls himself, surprising the callers, and answered questions candidly.

Years later, he recalled the flow of a typical conversation: "When did you play last?" "I didn't." "Where have you played before?" "I haven't." "When will you be playing next?" "I don't.". Nilsson acquired a manager, who steered him into a handful of TV guest appearances, and a brief run of stage performances in Europe set up by RCA. He disliked the experiences he had, though, and decided to stick to the recording studio. He later admitted this was a huge mistake on his part.

John Lennon called and praised Pandemonium Shadow Show, which he had listened to in a 36-hour marathon. Paul McCartney called the following day, also expressing his admiration. Eventually a message came, inviting him to London to meet the Beatles, watch them at work, and possibly sign with Apple.

Pandemonium Shadow Show was followed in 1968 by Aerial Ballet, an album that included Nilsson's rendition of Fred Neil's song "Everybody's Talkin'". A minor US hit at the time of release (and a top 40 hit in Canada), the song became more popular a year later when it was featured in the film Midnight Cowboy, and it earned Nilsson his first Grammy Award. The song also became Nilsson's first US top 10 hit, reaching No. 6, and his first Canadian #1.

Aerial Ballet also contained Nilsson's version of his composition "One", which was later taken to the top 5 of the US charts by Three Dog Night and also successfully covered in Australia by John Farnham. The album Aerial Ballet also inspired the band Aerosmith's name. In an interview, Aerosmith drummer Joey Kramer explained that Harry Nilsson's Aerial Ballet album helped spark the name. Kramer recalled, "I was listening to an album at the time, by Harry Nilsson, called Aerial Ballet. We were listening to this record and I started really getting off on the lyrics. We started kicking around this word 'aerial,' and 'aerial' eventually came into 'aero' – I don't know how that happened." He continued, "And it was like Aeromind, Aerostar, Aero-this, Aero-that; and somebody said 'smith' – Aerosmith? Wow!"

Nilsson was commissioned at this time to write and perform the theme song for the ABC television series The Courtship of Eddie's Father. The result, "Best Friend", was very popular, but Nilsson never released the song on record; the original version of the song (titled "Girlfriend") was recorded during the making of Aerial Ballet but not included on that LP, and it eventually appeared on the 1995 Personal Best anthology, and as a bonus track on a later release of Aerial Ballet. Late in 1968, the Monkees' notorious experimental film Head premiered, featuring a memorable song-and-dance sequence with Davy Jones and Toni Basil performing Nilsson's composition "Daddy's Song". (This is followed by Frank Zappa's cameo as "The Critic", who dismisses the 1920s-style tune as "pretty white".)

With the success of Nilsson's RCA recordings, Tower re-issued or re-packaged many of their early Nilsson recordings in various formats. All of these reissues failed to chart, including a 1969 single "Good Times". This track, however, was resurrected as a duet with Micky Dolenz for the 2016 Monkees' album of the same name by adding additional parts to an unused Monkees backing track recorded in 1968.

=== 1969–1972: Chart success ===
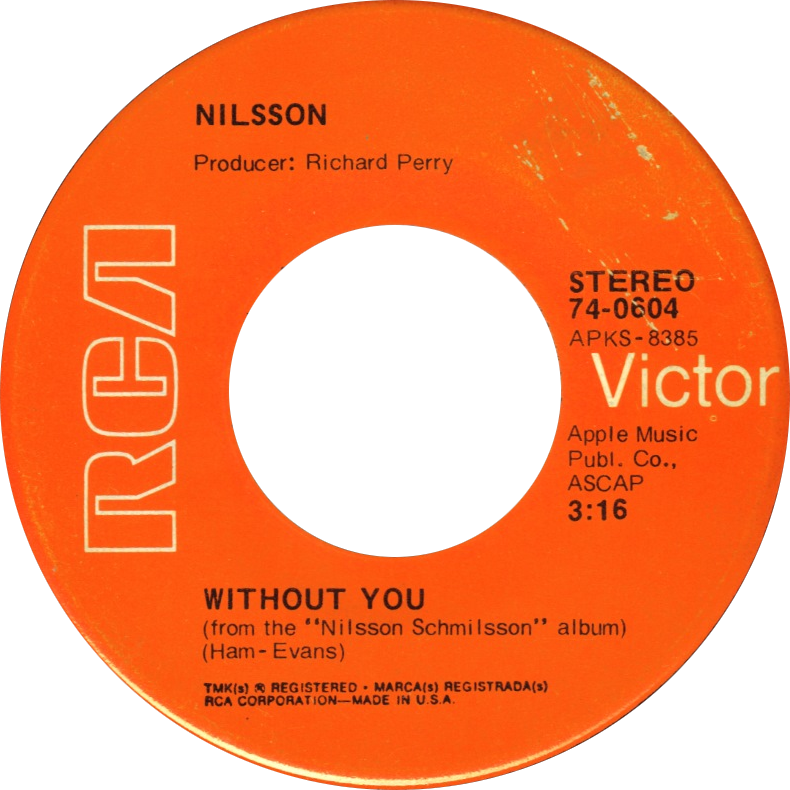
"Without You" from Nilsson Schmilsson 1971

Nilsson's next album, Harry (1969), was his first to hit the charts, and also provided a Top 40 single with "I Guess the Lord Must Be in New York City" (written as a contender for the theme to Midnight Cowboy), used in the Sophia Loren movie La Mortadella (1971) (US title: Lady Liberty). While the album still presented Nilsson as primarily a songwriter, his astute choice of cover material included, this time, a song by then-little-known composer Randy Newman, "Simon Smith and the Amazing Dancing Bear".

Nilsson was so impressed with Newman's talent that he devoted his entire next album to Newman compositions, with Newman himself playing piano behind Nilsson's multi-tracked vocals. The result, Nilsson Sings Newman (1970), was commercially disappointing but was named Record of the Year by Stereo Review magazine and provided momentum to Newman's career.

The self-produced Nilsson Sings Newman also marked the end of his collaboration with RCA staff producer Rick Jarrard, who recounted in the documentary Who is Harry Nilsson? that the partnership was terminated by a telegram from Nilsson, who abruptly informed Jarrard that he wanted to work with other producers, and the two never met or spoke again. Jarrard states in the documentary that he never found out why Nilsson had decided to terminate their professional relationship.

Nilsson's next project was an animated film, The Point!, created with animation director Fred Wolf, and broadcast on ABC television on February 2, 1971, as an "ABC Movie of the Week". Nilsson's self-produced album of songs from The Point! was well received and it spawned a top 40 single, "Me and My Arrow".

Later that year, Nilsson went to England with producer Richard Perry to record what became the most successful album of his career, Nilsson Schmilsson, which yielded three stylistically different hit singles. The first was a cover of Badfinger's song "Without You" (by British songwriters Pete Ham and Tom Evans), featuring a highly emotional arrangement and soaring vocals to match – recorded, according to Perry, in a single take. It was alleged, by Harry himself, that, upon hitting the highest note of the song, he burst a large haemorrhoid. The performance earned him his second Grammy Award.

The second single was "Coconut", a novelty calypso number featuring four characters (the narrator, the brother, the sister, and the doctor) all sung (at Perry's suggestion) in different voices by Nilsson. The song is best remembered for its chorus lyric ("Put de lime in de coconut, and drink 'em both up"). Also notable is that the entire song is played using one chord, C7. The third single, "Jump into the Fire", was raucous rock and roll, including a drum solo by Derek and the Dominos' Jim Gordon and a detuned bass part by Herbie Flowers.

Nilsson followed quickly with Son of Schmilsson (1972), released while its predecessor was still on the charts. Besides the problem of competing with himself, Nilsson was by then ignoring most of Perry's production advice, and his decision to give free rein to his bawdiness and bluntness on this release alienated some of his earlier, more conservative fan base. With lyrics like "I sang my balls off for you, baby", "Roll the world over / And give her a kiss and a feel", and the notorious "You're breakin' my heart / You're tearin' it apart / So fuck you" (a reference to his ongoing divorce), Nilsson had traveled far afield from his earlier work. The album nevertheless reached No. 12 on the Billboard 200, and the single "Spaceman" was a Top 40 hit in October 1972. The follow-up single "Remember (Christmas)", however, stalled at No. 53. A third single, the tongue-in-cheek C&W send up "Joy", was issued on RCA's country imprint Green and credited to Buck Earle, but it failed to chart.

Nilsson was known as a "singer-composer who is heard but not seen", as he did not perform in concerts or shows. Prior to agreeing to be featured on an episode of director and producer's Stanley Dorfman's In Concert series for the BBC, Nilsson had appeared only once, for a few moments, on television in Britain and once in America.

Nilsson's record producer, Richard Perry, referenced his lack of live performing in the book 'The Record Producers' by BBC Books, saying "He did do the In Concert series on BBC television with Stanley Dorfman, which was very popular at the time. His show was very interesting and innovative with a lot of new technology, multiple images and things like that, but I think any artist, with very few exceptions and none that I can really think of, can immeasurably enhance his career by appearing in front of the public. At some point, the public needs to reach out and touch the artist, experience and feel them in person."

=== 1973–1979: Maverick ===
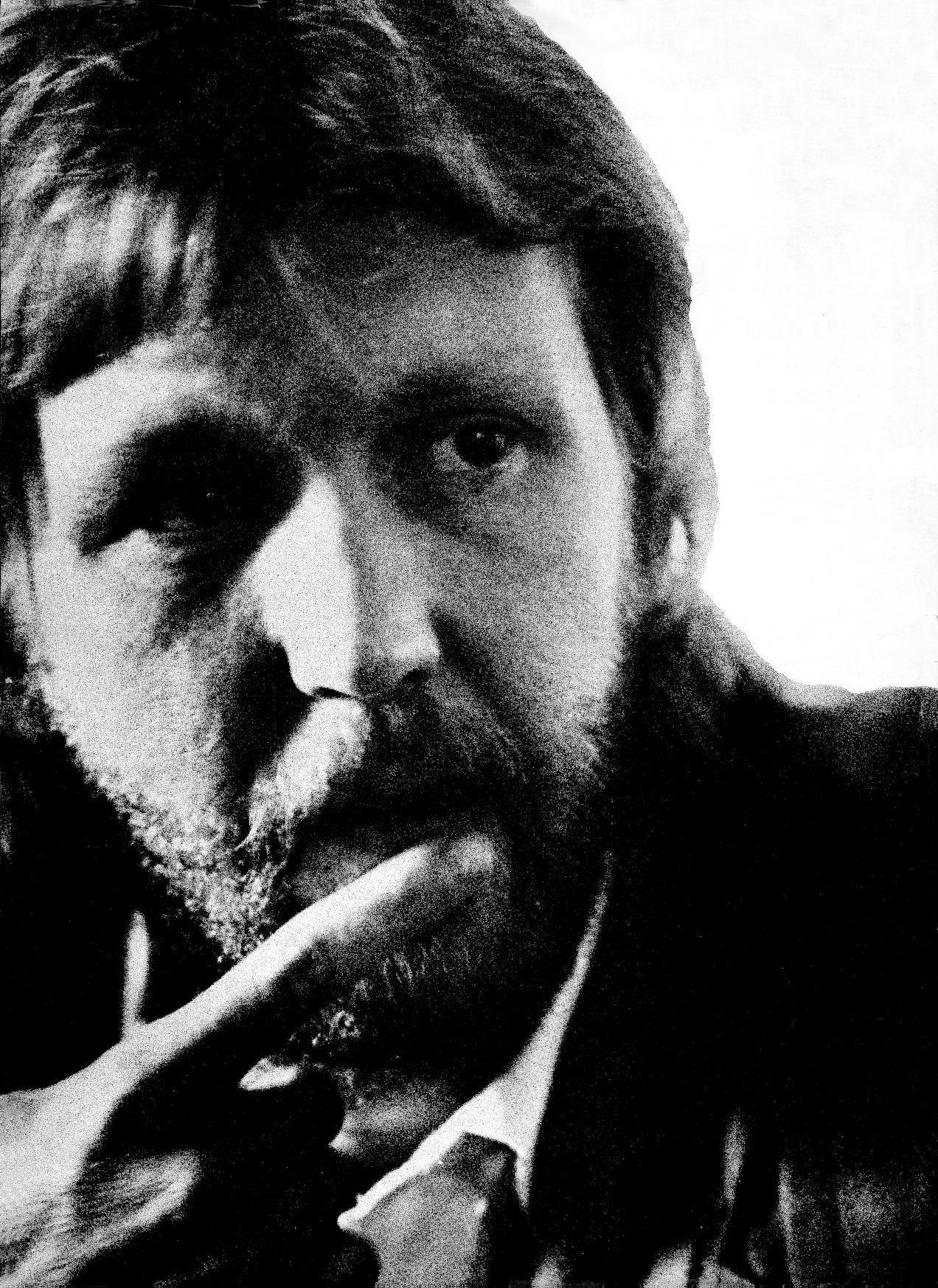
Nilsson in 1973

Nilsson's disregard for commercialism in favor of artistic satisfaction was on display in his next release, A Little Touch of Schmilsson in the Night (1973). Performing a selection of pop standards by the likes of Irving Berlin, Bert Kalmar, and Harry Ruby, Nilsson sang in front of an orchestra arranged and conducted by veteran Gordon Jenkins in sessions produced by Derek Taylor. This musical endeavor did not do well commercially. Days later, Nilsson and Jenkins recreated the performance for a BBC television special of the same name, directed and produced by Stanley Dorfman and filmed live in the BBC TV theatre in Shepherd's Bush.

In 1973, Nilsson was back in California, and when John Lennon moved there during his separation from Yoko Ono, the two musicians rekindled their earlier friendship. Lennon was intent upon producing Nilsson's next album, much to Nilsson's delight. However, their time together in California became known much more for heavy drinking than it did for musical collaboration. In a widely publicized incident, the two were ejected from the Troubadour nightclub in West Hollywood for drunken heckling of the Smothers Brothers.

To make matters worse, at a late night party and jam session during the recording of the album, attended by Lennon, McCartney, Danny Kortchmar, and other musicians, Nilsson ruptured a vocal cord, but he hid the injury for fear that Lennon would call a halt to the production. The resulting album was Pussy Cats. In an effort to clean up, Lennon, Nilsson and Ringo Starr first rented a house together, then Lennon and Nilsson left for New York. After the relative failure of his latest two albums, RCA Records considered dropping Nilsson's contract.

In a show of friendship, Lennon accompanied Nilsson to negotiations, and both intimated to RCA that Lennon and Starr might want to sign with them, once their Apple Records contracts with EMI expired in 1975, but would not be interested if Nilsson were no longer with the label. RCA took the hint and re-signed Nilsson, adding a bonus clause, to apply to each new album completed, but neither Lennon nor Starr signed with RCA.

In 1973, Nilsson performed in a film with Starr called Son of Dracula, a musical featuring many of his songs and a new cut, "Daybreak". The subsequent soundtrack produced by Richard Perry was released in 1974. Nilsson also sang backup on Starr's hit recording from 1973, "You're Sixteen".

Nilsson's voice had mostly recovered by his next release, Duit on Mon Dei (1975), but neither it nor its follow-ups, Sandman and ...That's the Way It Is (both 1976), were met with chart success. Finally, Nilsson recorded what he later considered to be his favorite album Knnillssonn (1977). With his voice strong again, and his songs exploring musical territory reminiscent of Harry or The Point!, Nilsson anticipated Knnillssonn to be a comeback album. RCA seemed to agree, and promised Nilsson a substantial marketing campaign for the album. However, the death of Elvis Presley caused RCA to ignore everything except meeting demand for Presley's back catalog, and the promised marketing push never happened. This, combined with RCA releasing a Nilsson Greatest Hits collection without consulting him, prompted Nilsson to leave the label.

==== Nilsson's London apartment ====
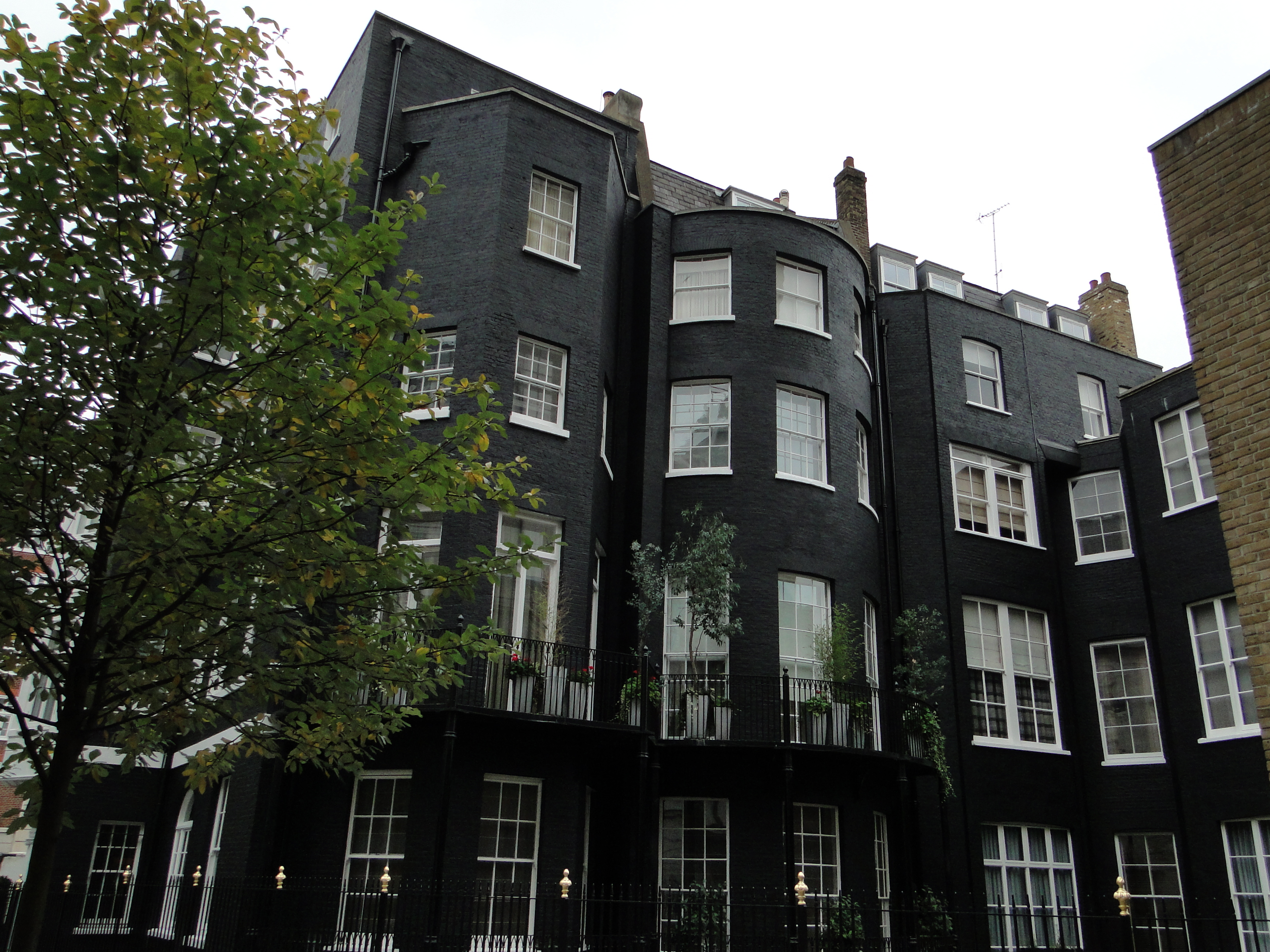
9 Curzon Place, London, in 2012. Apartment on 4th floor, at top right, belonged to Nilsson.

Nilsson's 1970s London residence, at Flat 12, 9 Curzon Place on the edge of Mayfair, was a two-bedroom apartment decorated by the ROR ("Ringo or Robin") design company owned by Starr and interior designer Robin Cruikshank. Nilsson cumulatively spent several years at the apartment, which was located near Apple Records, the Playboy Club, the Tramp nightclub, and the homes of friends and business associates. Nilsson's work and interests took him to the US for extended periods, and while he was away, he lent his place to numerous musician friends. During one of his absences, singer Cass Elliot, formerly of the Mamas & the Papas, and a few members of her tour group stayed at the apartment while she performed solo at the London Palladium, headlining with her torch songs and "Don't Call Me Mama Anymore". Following a strenuous performance with encores on July 29, 1974, Elliot was discovered in one of the bedrooms, dead of heart failure at age 32.

On September 7, 1978, the Who drummer Keith Moon returned to the same room in the apartment after a night out, and died at 32 from an overdose of Clomethiazole, a prescribed anti-alcohol drug. Nilsson, distraught over another friend's death in his apartment, and having little need for the property, sold it to Moon's bandmate Pete Townshend and consolidated his life in Los Angeles.

=== 1980–1992: Winding down ===
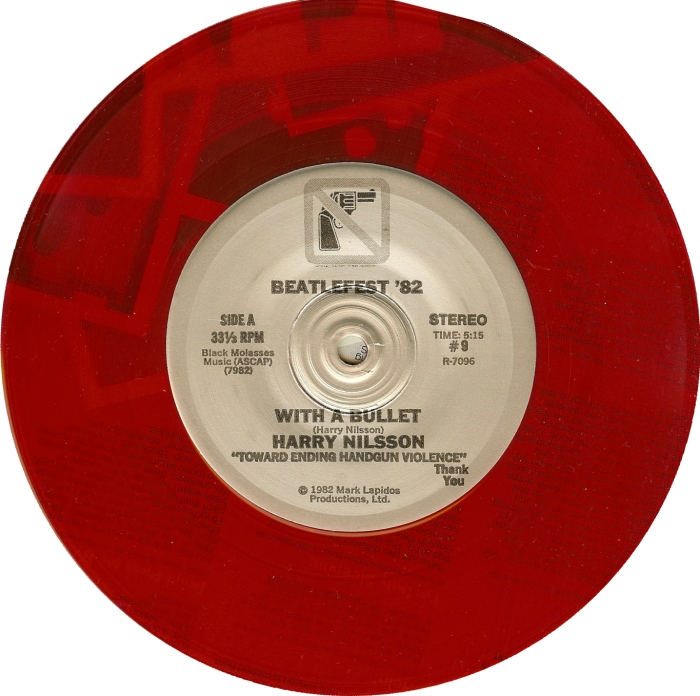
Nilsson's 1982 single, "With a Bullet"

Nilsson's musical output after leaving RCA Victor was sporadic. He wrote a musical, Zapata, with Perry Botkin Jr. and libretto by Allan Katz, which was produced and directed by longtime friend Bert Convy. The show was mounted at the Goodspeed Opera House in East Haddam, Connecticut, but never had another production. He wrote all the songs for Robert Altman's movie-musical Popeye (1980), the score of which met with unfavorable reviews.

Nilsson's Popeye compositions included several songs that were representative of Nilsson's acclaimed Point era, such as "Everything Is Food" and "Sweethaven". The song "He Needs Me" was featured years later in the film Punch-Drunk Love. Nilsson recorded one more album, Flash Harry, co-produced by Bruce Robb and Steve Cropper, which was released in the UK but not in the US. From this point onward, Nilsson increasingly began referring to himself as a "retired musician".

Nilsson was profoundly affected by the murder of John Lennon on December 8, 1980. He joined the Coalition to Stop Gun Violence and overcame his preference for privacy to make appearances for gun control fundraising. He began to appear at Beatlefest conventions and he would get on stage with the Beatlefest house band "Liverpool" to sing either some of his own songs or "Give Peace a Chance".

Nilsson was asked by Graham Chapman to contribute a score and songs to the 1983 movie Yellowbeard. However, after Nilsson had done some preliminary writing and recording work, the producers of the film decided not to continue with Nilsson's music, telling Chapman that they didn't think Nilsson could be counted on to finish the material in the allotted time. None of Nilsson's music was used in the finished film.

After a long hiatus from the studio, Nilsson started recording sporadically once again in the mid to late 1980s. Most of these recordings were commissioned songs for movies or television shows. One notable exception was his work on a Yoko Ono-Lennon tribute album, Every Man Has a Woman (1984) (Polydor); another was a cover of "Zip-A-Dee-Doo-Dah" recorded for Hal Willner's 1988 tribute album Stay Awake: Various Interpretations of Music from Vintage Disney Films. Nilsson donated his performance royalties from the song to the Coalition to Stop Gun Violence.

In 1985, Nilsson set up a production company, Hawkeye, to oversee various film, TV, and multimedia projects with which he was involved. He appointed his friend, satirist and screenwriter Terry Southern, as one of the principals. They collaborated on a number of screenplays including Obits (a Citizen Kane-style story about a journalist investigating an obituary notice) and The Telephone, a comedy about an unhinged unemployed actor.

The Telephone was virtually the only Hawkeye project that made it to the screen. It had been written with Robin Williams in mind but he turned it down; comedian-actress Whoopi Goldberg then signed on, with Southern's friend Rip Torn directing, but the project was troubled. Torn battled with Goldberg, who interfered in the production and constantly digressed from the script during shooting, and Torn was forced to plead with her to perform takes that stuck to the screenplay. Torn, Southern, and Nilsson put together their own version of the film, which screened at the Sundance Film Festival in early 1988, but it was overtaken by the 'official' version from the studio, and this version premiered to poor reviews in late January 1988. The project reportedly had some later success when adapted as a theatre piece in Germany.

In 1990, Hawkeye floundered, and Nilsson found himself in a dire financial situation after it was discovered that his financial adviser, Cindy Sims, had embezzled all the funds he had earned as a recording artist. The Nilssons were left with $300 in the bank and a mountain of debt, while Sims was imprisoned for less than two years before her 1994 release and was not required to pay restitution.

In 1991, the Disney album For Our Children, a compilation of children's music performed by celebrities to benefit the Elizabeth Glaser Pediatric AIDS Foundation, included Nilsson's original composition "Blanket for a Sail", recorded at the Shandaliza Recording Studio in Los Angeles. Also in 1991, he recorded a cover of "How About You?" for the soundtrack of the Terry Gilliam film The Fisher King. In 1992, he wrote and recorded the title song for the film Me Myself & I.

Nilsson made his last concert appearance on September 1, 1992, when he joined Ringo Starr & His All-Starr Band on stage at Caesars Palace in Las Vegas, to sing "Without You" with Todd Rundgren handling the high notes. Afterward, an emotional Starr embraced Nilsson on stage. Nilsson's final album, tentatively titled Papa's Got a Brown New Robe (produced by Mark Hudson) was not released, though several demos from the album were later made available on promotional CDs and online.

=== 1993–1994: Heart attack and death ===
Born with congenital heart problems, Nilsson suffered a heart attack on February 14, 1993. After surviving that, he pressured his former label, RCA Records, to release a boxed-set retrospective of his career, and resumed recording, attempting to complete one final album. He finished the vocal tracks for the album with producer Mark Hudson, who held onto the tapes of that session.

In 1994, Nilsson died of a heart attack, at the age of 52, while recording what became his last album, Losst and Founnd (2019).

=== Posthumous releases ===
In 1995, the 2-disc CD anthology he worked on with RCA, Personal Best, was released.

On November 22, 2019, the final album was eventually released as Losst and Founnd.

== Personal life ==
Nilsson married Sandi McTaggart on October 24, 1964; they divorced in 1967 without progeny. He married Diane Clatworthy on December 31, 1969. They had one son, Zak, who died of cancer in 2021. Nilsson and Clatworthy divorced in 1974. Nilsson married Una O'Keeffe on August 12, 1976. They remained married until his death on January 15, 1994. They had six children.

Nilsson died of heart failure on January 15, 1994 in his Agoura Hills, California home at the age of 52.

Nilsson is interred in the Valley Oaks Memorial Park at Westlake Village, California.

== Legacy ==
=== Who Is Harry Nilsson? ===
Nilsson is the subject of the 2006 documentary Who Is Harry Nilsson (And Why Is Everybody Talkin' About Him)? written, directed, and co-produced by John Scheinfeld, the film was screened in 2006 at the Seattle International Film Festival and the Santa Barbara International Film Festival. In August 2006, the film received its Los Angeles premiere when it was screened at the 7th Annual Mods & Rockers Film Festival, followed by a panel discussion featuring the filmmakers and two friends of Nilsson: producer Richard Perry and attorney/executive producer Lee Blackman.

The filmmakers re-edited the film with rare found footage of Nilsson, additional interviews, and family photographs, and released it on September 17, 2010, at selected theaters in the United States. A DVD, including additional footage not in the theatrical release, was released on October 26, 2010.

=== The RCA Albums Collection ===
On July 30, 2013, Sony Music released a definitive box-set of his RCA era albums called The RCA Albums Collection. Each of the albums in the 17-CD set had additional bonus tracks, and three of the 17 discs contained rarities and outtakes spanning his entire career. Several weeks later on August 13, Flash Harry was finally issued on CD, which also featured additional material.

=== Awards and accolades ===
- 2007: The New York Post rated Nilsson's cover of Fred Neil's "Everybody's Talkin'" No. 51 on their list of the 100 Best Cover Songs of All Time
- 2012: Rolling Stone ranked Nilsson as 62nd on its list of "The 100 Greatest Songwriters of All Time"

Grammy Awards

| Year | Nominee / work | Award | Result |
|---|---|---|---|
| 1970 | "Everybody's Talkin'" | Best Contemporary Vocal Performance, Male | Won |
| 1973 | "Without You" | Best Male Pop Vocal Performance | Won |
| 1973 | "Without You" | Record of the Year | Nominated |
| 1973 | Nilsson Schmilsson | Album of the Year | Nominated |
| 1973 | Son of Schmilsson | Best Engineered Album, Non-Classical | Nominated |

== Discography ==
- Spotlight on Nilsson (1966)
- Pandemonium Shadow Show (1967)
- Aerial Ballet (1968)
- Skidoo (1968) (soundtrack)
- Harry (1969)
- Nilsson Sings Newman (1970)
- The Point! (1970) (studio album and soundtrack)
- Nilsson Schmilsson (1971)
- Son of Schmilsson (1972)
- A Little Touch of Schmilsson in the Night (1973)
- Son of Dracula (1974) (soundtrack)
- Pussy Cats (1974)
- Duit on Mon Dei (1975)
- Sandman (1976)
- ...That's the Way It Is (1976)
- Knnillssonn (1977)
- Flash Harry (1980)
- Popeye (1980) (soundtrack)
- Losst and Founnd (2019)

== Filmography ==
| Title | Year | Actor | Music | Notes |
|---|---|---|---|---|
| Skidoo | 1968 | Yes | Yes | Songs written and performed; soundtrack music composer; actor (minor role) |
| The Ghost & Mrs. Muir | 1969 | Yes | Yes | Actor and singer in the episode "The Music Maker"; appeared as Tim Seagirt and sang "Without Her" and "If Only I Could Touch Your Hand" |
| The Courtship of Eddie's Father | 1969–1972 | | Yes | Theme song written and performed; incidental music |
| Jenny | 1970 | | Yes | Song "Waiting" written and performed |
| The Point! | 1971 | | Yes | Story; all songs written and performed |
| Son of Dracula | 1974 | Yes | Yes | Actor (lead role); songs performed |
| In God We Tru$t | 1980 | | Yes | New version of "Good for God" written and performed |
| Popeye | 1980 | | Yes | Songs written, except "I'm Popeye the Sailor Man" |
| Handgun | 1983 | | Yes | Song "Lay Down Your Arms" written and performed |
| First Impressions | 1988 | | Yes | Theme song co-written and performed |
| The Telephone | 1988 | | | Screenplay co-written by Nilsson; only released film of Nilsson's production company, Hawkeye |
| Camp Candy | 1989–1992 | | Yes | Theme song written and performed with John Candy |
| Me Myself & I | 1992 | | Yes | Song "Me Myself & I" written and performed |

== Tributes and cover versions ==
- "One" was covered by Three Dog Night in 1969, among many others
- "Coconut" was covered by The Muppets on The Muppet Show in 1979, in episode 410.
- "Perfect Day" was covered by Dresage and Slow Shiver, featured in the intro of the Better Call Saul episode "Fun and Games."
- Nilsson by Tipton (1970, Warner Bros. Records), Although it may not be considered a tribute, it featured George Tipton conducting instrumental versions of 11 Nilsson songs.
- For the Love of Harry: Everybody Sings Nilsson (1995, MusicMasters/BMG), featured Nilsson's songs performed by Ringo Starr, Stevie Nicks, Richard Barone, Brian Wilson, Aimee Mann, Fred Schneider, and others, with proceeds benefiting the Coalition to Stop Gun Violence.
- I'll Never Leave You: A Tribute to Harry Nilsson (2005, Wood Records). A percentage of profits from sales of the CD went to benefit Amnesty International
- Ringo Starr co-wrote "Harry's Song" as a tribute to Nilsson on his 2008 album Liverpool 8.
- "Pussy Cats" Starring The Walkmen (2006, Record Collection) The whole of the Pussy Cats album covered by the Walkmen.
- The Monkees recorded "Good Times" in 2016 for their album "Good Times" by using Nilsson's vocal tracks and new arrangement.
- Billy J. Kramer recorded the song "1941" in 1968 before Nilsson was well known.
- "Without Her" has been covered by Glen Campbell, Blood, Sweat and Tears, Herb Alpert and the Tijuana Brass, Astrud Gilberto, and George Benson.
- This Is the Town: A Tribute to Nilsson, Vol. 1 and This Is the Town: A Tribute to Nilsson, Vol. 2 (2014, 2019, The Royal Potato / Royal Potato Family Records), feature Nilsson songs performed by various indie artists.
- Sean Nelson released Nelson Sings Nilsson, a whole album of Nilsson's songs, in 2019.
- Ty Segall released a set of covers of six Nilsson Schmilsson tracks, Segall Smeagol, on Bandcamp in March 2020.
- The title track of Lana Del Rey's 2023 studio album Did You Know That There's a Tunnel Under Ocean Blvd was inspired by Nilsson's 1974 track Don't Forget Me from Pussy Cats.

== Bibliography ==
- Shipton, Alyn (2013). Nilsson: The Life of a Singer-Songwriter. Oxford University Press. ISBN 978-0-19-933069-0.
