= Duit on Mon Dei =

Duit On Mon Dei

Studio album by Nilsson
- Released: March 1975
- Recorded: July–December 1974
- Studios: RCA's Music Center of the World, Hollywood, California
- Genre: Pop
- Length: 32:31
- Label: RCA Victor
- Producer: Harry Nilsson

Nilsson chronology
Pussy Cats (1974)	Duit On Mon Dei (1975)	Sandman (1976)

Singles from Duit On Mon Dei
- 1. "Kojak Columbo" / "Turn Out the Light" Released: February 1975

Professional ratings
Review scores
Source	Rating
AllMusic	3/5 stars
Christgau's Record Guide	B−
The Essential Rock Discography	4/10

Duit on Mon Dei is the eleventh album by American singer and songwriter Harry Nilsson, released by RCA Victor in March 1975. Its provisional title was God's Greatest Hits but management at RCA Records did not approve. The title is a punning spelling of "Do It On Monday", playing on the British Monarchy's motto Dieu et mon droit (God and my right). The pun was originally used on the cover of Ringo Starr's 1973 album Ringo.

== Production ==
Duit on Mon Dei marked the first time Nilsson acted as his own producer since 1971. Van Dyke Parks characterized his role during the sessions as Nilsson's "musical secretary"; in other words, translating his fragmentary concepts into fully realized compositions. According to music historian Richard Henderson, Parks' organizational skills proved vital during the chaotic, drug-fueled sessions.

Nilsson drew inspiration from Parks' Trinidadian musical explorations and both musicians had a longtime familiarity with the session players, including Jesse Ed Davis, Jim Keltner, Bobby Keys, and Klaus Voormann, whom Parks had previously worked with throughout 1974. Nilsson also revisited older demos, such as "Turn Out the Light", which Parks and arranger Fredric Myrow reworked with steel pans and brass to evoke a Caribbean aesthetic, and the new original "Kojak Columbo", co-developed by Parks and Dr. John. Parks also originated the song "Good for God", which Nilsson expanded from a spontaneous studio exchange. Plans for live performances involving Parks and the studio ensemble, plus Jesse Ed Davis and Ringo Starr, were abandoned due to challenges securing Nilsson's ideal venue.

== Critical reception ==
Robert Christgau of The Village Voice compared Nilsson's production style unfavorably to "an audio salesman". The A.V. Club retrospectively dubbed Duit on Mon Dei "vastly underrated".

== Track listing ==
All songs written by Harry Nilsson, except where noted

1. "Jesus Christ You're Tall" – 1:20 (demo version; re-recorded on Sandman)
2. "It's a Jungle Out There" – 3:57
3. "Down by the Sea" – 2:30
4. "Kojak Columbo" – 3:30
5. "Easier for Me" – 2:30 (previously recorded by Ringo Starr as "Easy for Me" on Goodnight Vienna)
6. "Turn Out the Light" – 2:27
7. "Salmon Falls" (Nilsson, Klaus Voormann) – 4:10
8. "Puget Sound" – 2:22
9. "What's Your Sign" (featuring Gloria Jones and the Zodiac Singers) – 2:50
10. "Home" – 3:32
11. "Good for God" – 3:23 (re-recorded later for In God We Tru$t.)

The 8-track tape version (RCA APS1-0817) included excerpts from "Salmon Falls" placed throughout Programs 1 and 2, and then in full length at the beginning of Program 3, as well as "Turn Out The Light (Reprise)" closing the album at the end of Program 4. None of the excerpted versions of "Salmon Falls" or "Turn Out The Light (Reprise)" appear on any other format of the album, nor are there any such versions included with compilation albums or non-album singles:

1. Program 1: Salmon Falls : Jesus Christ You're Tall : Salmon Falls : It's a Jungle Out There : Salmon Falls : Down By The Sea
2. Program 2: Kojak Columbo : Easier For Me : Salmon Falls : Turn Out The Light
3. Program 3: Salmon Falls : Puget Sound : What's Your Sign
4. Program 4: Home : Good For God : Turn Out The Light (Reprise)

== Personnel ==
- Harry Nilsson – vocals, piano (1, 11)
- Gloria Jones – vocals (9)
- The Zodiac Singers – vocals (9)
- Jesse Ed Davis – guitar (2, 3, 4, 6, 8, 9, 10, 11)
- Danny Kootch – guitar (2, 3, 4, 6, 8, 9, 10, 11)
- Dennis Budimir – guitar (6)
- Jim Keltner – drums (2, 3, 4, 6, 7, 8, 9, 10, 11)
- Ringo Starr – drums (4), vocals (11)
- Robert Greenidge – steel drums (2, 3, 4, 6, 7, 8, 10, 11)
- Klaus Voormann – bass (2, 3, 4, 6, 7, 8, 9, 10, 11)
- Lyle Ritz – bass (7)
- Van Dyke Parks – piano (2, 3, 6, 8, 10), synthesizer (8)
- Dr. John – piano (4)
- Jane Getz – piano (7, 9)
- Fredric Myrow – organ (2), orchestration (6)
- Bobby Keys – saxophone (2, 4, 8, 10, 11), tenor saxophone (3, 6, 9)
- Trevor Lawrence – saxophone (2, 4, 6, 8, 10, 11), soprano saxophone (3), tenor saxophone (9)
- Gene Cipriano – saxophone (2, 4), baritone saxophone (6, 9, 10), tenor saxophone (11)
- Charles Dinwiddie – saxophone (2, 10)
- Johnny Rotella – baritone saxophone (3, 6)
- Clifford "Bud" Shank – soprano saxophone (3)
- Martin M. Krystall – tenor saxophone (6)
- Steve Douglas – tenor saxophone (9)
- Jerry Jumonville – baritone saxophone (10)
- Tommy Shepard – trombone (6)
- Lew McCreary – trombone (6)
- Tony Terran – trumpet (6)
- Malcolm McNab – trumpet (6)
- Jay Migliori – flute (2)
- Joey DeAguero – marimba (2, 4, 8)
- John Bergamo – marimba (6)
- Doug Dillard – banjo (4)
- Gene Estes – percussion (3), timpani (7), shakers (9)
- Milt Holland – percussion (4), cimbalom (6)
- Emmett Kennedy – percussion (3, 4)
- Carl McKnight – percussion (11)
- Pat Murphy – percussion (2, 11), congas (4)
- Gayle Levant – harp (2)
- Denzil Laughton – harp (6)
- Gordon Howard Marrow – viola (6)
- The Perry Botkin Orchestra – orchestra (3, 7)
- The Jim Price Orchestra – strings (5)
- Perry Botkin, Jr. – arrangements and conducting (3, 7, 9)
- Jim Price – arrangement and conducting (5)
