= Losst and Founnd =

Studio album by Harry Nilsson
- Released: November 22, 2019
- Recorded: 1990–1994 (original recording dates)
- Studios: Cove City Sound Studios, Fonogenic Studios, Mission Sound, The Village Recorder, Whatinthewhatthe? Studio
- Genre: Pop
- Length: 43:03
- Label: Omnivore Recordings
- Producer: Mark Hudson

Harry Nilsson chronology
| Popeye (1980) | Losst and Founnd (2019) |

Professional ratings
Review scores
| Source | Rating |
|---|---|
| AllMusic | 3.5/5 stars |
| NME | 3/5 stars |
| Pitchfork | 5.8/10 |

Losst and Founnd is a studio album recorded partly in the early 1990s by American musician and songwriter Harry Nilsson and released by Omnivore Recordings in November 2019. It consists of material drawn from his unfinished final album, Papa's Got a Brown New Robe, completed with new overdubs under original producer Mark Hudson.

== Background ==
In the early 1990s, Nilsson was ready to return to music after a decade since his last studio album. But after a disastrous meeting with Warner Bros. Records where he was turned down by the label, Nilsson and his then producer Mark Hudson began work by themselves on the then tentatively titled Papa's Got a Brown New Robe album.

Nilsson suffered a heart attack on February 14, 1993. After surviving that, he began pressing his former label, RCA Records, to release a boxed-set retrospective of his career (released in 1995 as Personal Best), and resumed recording, attempting to complete his final album. Nilsson died of heart failure on January 15, 1994, in his Agoura Hills, California home, at the age of 52.

Before he died, Nilsson did finish the vocal tracks for the album with producer Mark Hudson, who held onto the tapes of that session for nearly 25 years in hopes of finishing the material. Since Nilsson's death, various demos from these sessions appeared on bootlegs over the years. In 2006 Warner/Chappell released a promotional only compilation of Nilsson's music titled Perfect Day – The Songs of Nilsson 1971–1993, which featured versions of the songs "Animal Farm" and "U.C.L.A.".

With the blessing of Nilsson's estate, the album was completed and retitled Losst and Founnd after a comment Nilsson made after the meeting with Warner Bros. – “they thought I was lost, but I was found”.

The final album was released on November 22, 2019.

== Track listing ==
All music and lyrics by Harry Nilsson, except where noted.

1. "Lost and Found" (Harry Nilsson, Mark Hudson, Steve Dudas) – 4:02
2. "Woman Oh Woman" – 3:16
3. "U.C.L.A." – 4:21
4. "Hi-Heel Sneakers/Rescue Boy Medley" (Robert Higginbotham)/(Harry Nilsson, Mark Hudson) – 3:58
5. "Lullaby" – 3:11
6. "Animal Farm" – 4:54
7. "Listen, the Snow Is Falling" (Yoko Ono) – 4:01
8. "Try" (Harry Nilsson, Mark Hudson) – 3:15
9. "Love Is the Answer" – 3:56
10. "Yo Dodger Blue" – 3:14
11. "What Does a Woman See in a Man" (Jimmy Webb) – 5:01

== Personnel ==
- Harry Nilsson - lead and backing vocals; electric piano ("Woman Oh Woman", "U.C.L.A."), synthesizer ("Lost and Found"); timpani
- Mark Hudson - producer; acoustic guitar, bass guitar; backing vocals; percussion; horn arrangement ("Hi-Heel Sneakers/Rescue Boy Medley", "Animal Farm")
- Ricky Zahariades - acoustic, electric, dobro, and slide guitars
- Kiefo Nilsson - bass guitar (1, 2, 4, 5, 8, 10)
- Jim Cox - piano, electric organ, celesta, synthesizer, accordion; string arrangement ("U.C.L.A.", "What Does a Woman See in a Man"), horn arrangement ("Lost and Found", "Woman Oh Woman", "U.C.L.A.")
- Gary Burr - backing vocals; sitar ("Lost and Found")
- Andy Martin - trombone
- Rob Schaer - trumpet
- Dan Higgins - saxophone, clarinet; flute
- Melissa Hudson - percussion; backing vocals
- Dan Moore - percussion
- Jim Keltner - drums (1, 2, 4, 5, 7, 8, 10)

Additional Musicians

- Billy Amendola - percussion ("Lost and Found")
- Van Dyke Parks - accordion ("Woman Oh Woman")
- Dave Eggar - strings; string arrangement ("Lullaby")
- Paul Santo - slide guitar ("Lullaby"), electric guitar ("Yo Dodger Blue")
- Steve Carnelli - guitar ("Listen, the Snow Is Falling")
- Val McCallum - guitar ("Listen, the Snow Is Falling")
- Klaus Voormann - bass guitar ("Listen, the Snow Is Falling")
- Randy Kerber - keyboards ("Listen, the Snow Is Falling")
- Danny Lipsitz - horns, clarinet; horns arrangement ("Try"), saxophone, saxophone arrangement ("Yo Dodger Blue")
- Jimmy Webb - piano ("What Does a Woman See in a Man")
- Unknown Chicago musicians - drums ("U.C.L.A.", "Animal Farm", "Love is the Answer"); piano, keyboards ("Love is the Answer")

Studio Personnel

- Mark Hudson - producer
- Dan Moore - recording engineer
- Mario J. McNulty - mixing engineer
- Gary Burr - additional engineering
- John Arbuckle - additional engineering
- Oliver Straus - additional engineering
