= Sandman (album) =

Studio album by Nilsson
- Released: January 1976
- Recorded: Late 1975
- Genre: Pop
- Length: 35:07
- Label: RCA Victor
- Producer: Harry Nilsson

Nilsson chronology
Duit on Mon Dei (1975)	Sandman (1976)	…That's the Way It Is (1976)

Singles from Sandman
- 1. "Something True" / "Pretty Soon There'll Be Nothing Left for Everybody" Released: January 16, 1976 (UK)

Professional ratings
Review scores
Source	Rating
AllMusic	3.5/5 stars
Christgau's Record Guide	B−
The Essential Rock Discography	4/10

Sandman is the twelfth studio album by American singer-songwriter Harry Nilsson, released in January 1976 on RCA Victor.

== Track listing ==
All music and lyrics by Harry Nilsson, except where noted.

1. "I'll Take a Tango" (Alex Harvey) – 2:58
2. "Something True" (Nilsson, Perry Botkin, Jr.) – 2:54
3. "Pretty Soon There'll Be Nothing Left for Everybody" – 2:50
4. "The Ivy Covered Walls" – 3:15
5. "Here's Why I Did Not Go to Work Today" (Nilsson, Danny Kortchmar) – 4:05
6. "The Flying Saucer Song" – 6:40
7. "How to Write a Song" – 3:12
8. "Jesus Christ You're Tall" – 4:08
9. "Will She Miss Me" – 4:43

== Personnel ==
- Harry Nilsson – vocals
- Joe Cocker – vocals on "The Flying Saucer Song"
- Doug Dillard – banjo
- Klaus Voormann – bass
- Jim Keltner – drums
- Danny Kortchmar, Fred Tackett, Jesse Ed Davis – guitar
- Jane Getz, Leon Russell, Van Dyke Parks – keyboards
- Emil Richards, Emmett Kennedy, Gary Coleman, Joe DeAguero, Pat Murphy, Robert Greenidge – percussion
- Bobby Keys, Gene Cipriano, Jay Migliori, Jim Horn, John Rotella, Trevor Lawrence – saxophone
- Bobby Bruce, Ilene Novog, The Perry Botkin, Jr. Orchestra and Singers – strings

Production and technical personnel

- Perry Botkin Jr. – arrangements on "Something True", "The Ivy Covered Walls" and "Will She Miss Me"
- Richie Schmitt – recording engineer, associate producer
- Pete Abbott, Artie Torgersen, Mike Moran – second engineers
- Gribbitt – design and graphics
- Klaus Voormann – inside artwork
- Mal "The Pal" Evans – cover photography
- Marge Meoli – A&R coordination

== Charts ==
Chart (1976)	Peak position
U.S. Billboard 200	111

== The Flying Saucer Song ==
Many people think they recognize one of the main voices in "The Flying Saucer Song" as Joe Cocker. But the voices are all Nilsson using three distinct voice inflections. The gruff background vocals, however, are provided by Joe Cocker, whose coarse delivery is similar to Nilsson's.

"I don't think there's that much of a similarity," Nilsson remarked, "It's just that we both can occasionally muster up a brandy tone. We're whiskey-throated tenors. The Orson Welles type of guy from Citizen Kane."

"The Flying Saucer Song" was written for, and originally recorded, during the Pussy Cats sessions but was not released until Sandman.
