= Knnillssonn =

Studio album by Harry Nilsson
- Released: 1977
- Recorded: 1976–1977
- Studios: Audio International, London, England
- Genres: Rock, pop
- Length: 37:35
- Label: RCA Victor
- Producer: Harry Nilsson

Harry Nilsson chronology
…That's the Way It Is (1976)	Knnillssonn (1977)	Early Tymes (1977)

Singles from Knnillssonn
- 1. "All I Think About Is You" Released: June 10, 1977 (UK); October 1977 (US); 2. "Who Done It?" / "Perfect Day" Released: July 1977 (US); 3. "Lean on Me" / "Will She Miss Me" Released: October 28, 1977 (UK)

Knnillssonn is the fourteenth studio album by the American musician Harry Nilsson, released in 1977. Knnillssonn was Nilsson's final album for RCA Records. It was his personal favorite while recording it, as his voice had recovered from the damage done during the 1974 Pussy Cats sessions; his songs were more developed and his singing was in top form.

== Release ==
RCA Records management agreed and had prepared to promote Knnillssonn heavily as his comeback album. Nilsson's last several albums had been released with little advance notice and promotion and were mostly overlooked by the public. Shortly after the release of Knnillssonn, Elvis Presley died suddenly on August 16, 1977, at age 42; Presley and Nilsson were both RCA recording artists and Presley's unexpected death resulted in a complete overhaul of RCA's forthcoming release schedules and promotion plans. Demand for Presley's recordings was so high immediately after his death, stores could not keep them in stock; RCA's pressing plants were working 24-hour shifts to meet demand. Money and resources allotted to Knnillssonn and other new RCA releases was all redirected to promoting Presley's recently issued final album Moody Blue, as well as the repressing and promotion of Presley's back catalog and the development of future reissues and releases of RCA's extensive collection of unissued Presley material.

Klaus Voormann, billed on the album as Mara Gibb, was the guest mystery singer on "Perfect Day". The St. Paul's Cathedral Choir Boys choir is also on this track in addition to "All I Think About Is You."

== Critical reception ==
Professional ratings
Review scores
Source	Rating
AllMusic	3/5 stars
The Essential Rock Discography	4/10
MusicHound Rock: The Essential Album Guide	2/5 stars

The Los Angeles Times dismissed the album as "a bland, weak collection that doesn't even make very good Muzak."

In 1995, the Chicago Tribune labeled Knnillssonn an "obscure near-masterpiece."

== Track listing ==
All music and lyrics by Harry Nilsson

1. "All I Think About Is You" – 4:04
2. "I Never Thought I'd Get This Lonely" – 5:06
3. "Who Done It?" – 5:20
4. "Lean on Me" – 2:51
5. "Goin' Down" – 3:11
6. "Old Bones" – 2:58
7. "Sweet Surrender" – 4:42
8. "Blanket for a Sail" – 2:33
9. "Laughin' Man" – 2:56
10. "Perfect Day" – 3:54

== Personnel ==
- Harry Nilsson – vocals
- Klaus Voormann – guest vocals

== Charts ==
Album

Year	Chart	Position
1977	Billboard Pop Albums	108

Single

Year	Single	Chart	Position
1977	"All I Think About Is You"	UK Singles Chart (OCC)	43
