= Spotlight on Nilsson =

Studio album by Nilsson
- Released: 20 December 1966
- Recorded: 1964–1966
- Genre: Pop
- Length: 22:39
- Label: Tower

Nilsson chronology
Spotlight on Nilsson (1966)	Pandemonium Shadow Show (1967)

Professional ratings
Review scores
Source	Rating
Allmusic	2.5/5 stars

Spotlight on Nilsson is the debut album by Harry Nilsson. It is essentially a compilation of all four of the singles (and their respective B-Sides) that were released during his tenure on the Tower label (1964–1966), plus two previously unreleased tracks. It has been re-issued numerous times over the years with different sleeves, attempting to capitalize on his later success at RCA Victor. It was released in 1969 on 8-track on Pickwick as Rock 'N' Roll, without "The Path That Leads to Trouble", and in the UK on EMI's One-Up label in 1972 as Early Years, with the original tracklisting.

The track "Good Times" would be later covered by the Monkees as the title track for their 2016 reunion album.

== Track listing ==
All tracks composed by Harry Nilsson; except where indicated

1. "The Path That Leads to Trouble" (Johnny Cole) – 2:08 - with The New Salvation Singers
2. "Good Times" – 1:50 - with The New Salvation Singers
3. "So You Think You've Got Troubles" (Marvin Rainwater) – 2:20
4. "I'm Gonna Lose My Mind" (Johnny Cole) – 2:06
5. "She's Yours" (Nilsson, J.R. Shanklin) – 2:02
6. "Sixteen Tons" (Merle Travis) – 2:29
7. "Born in Grenada" (Nilsson, John Marascalco) – 2:16
8. "You Can't Take Your Love (Away from Me)" – 2:20
9. "Growin' Up" – 2:48
10. "Do You Believe" – 2:20
