= Son of Dracula (1974 film) =

1974 film by Freddie Francis

- American Theatrical release poster
- Directed by: Freddie Francis
- Written by: Jennifer Jayne
- Produced by: Jerry Gross; Ringo Starr; Tim Van Rellim
- Starring: Harry Nilsson; Ringo Starr; Freddie Jones
- Cinematography: Norman Warwick
- Edited by: Garth Craven; Neil Travis
- Music by: Paul Buckmaster
- Distributed by: Cinemation Industries (U.S.), Apple Films
- Release date: 19 April 1974 (U.S.)
- Running time: 90 minutes
- Country: United Kingdom
- Language: English

Son of Dracula is a 1974 British musical film directed by Freddie Francis and starring Harry Nilsson and Ringo Starr. It was produced by Starr and released in 1974 by Apple Films. It is also the title of a soundtrack released in conjunction with the film. Keith Moon of The Who and John Bonham of Led Zeppelin both appear in the film, alternating as the drummer in Count Downe's band. Other band members include Klaus Voormann (another old friend of Starr), Peter Frampton, an uncredited Leon Russell, and the regular Rolling Stones horn section of Bobby Keys and Jim Price.

In the film, Count Dracula is assassinated, and his son Count Downe is supposed to inherit his control over the Netherworld. Instead, the son wishes to become mortal and asks Dr. Abraham Van Helsing to help him transform into an ordinary human.

== Plot ==
After the killing of his father Count Dracula, the King of the Netherworld, by a mysterious assassin, Count Downe is summoned from his travels abroad by family advisor Merlin in order to prepare him to take over the throne. Baron Victor Frankenstein is also on hand to help in any way he can. Problem is, Downe wants no part of this responsibility, and instead wishes to become human and mortal − especially after meeting a girl named Amber, with whom he falls in love. He approaches old family nemesis Dr. Abraham Van Helsing, who agrees to enable the Count's transformation, much to the dismay of the residents of the Netherworld.

Despite the best efforts of a host of monsters, as well as the traitorous Frankenstein who is dealt with by the trusted Merlin, Van Helsing performs the operation and removes Downe's fangs. He then informs the Count that he can now live out his days in the sunlight, with Amber at his side.

== Cast ==
- Harry Nilsson as Count Downe
- Ringo Starr as Merlin
- Freddie Jones as Baron Victor Frankenstein
- Suzanna Leigh as Amber
- Dennis Price as Dr. Abraham Van Helsing
- Peter Frampton as Count Downe's Band member
- John Bonham as Count Downe's Band member
- Keith Moon as Count Downe's Band member
- Klaus Voormann as Count Downe's Band member
- Leon Russell as Count Downe's Band member
- Skip Martin as Igor
- David Bailie as Chauffeur
- Shakira Baksh as Housekeeper
- Jenny Runacre as Woman in Black
- Beth Morris as Wendy
- Hedger Wallace as Vampire
- Dan Meaden as Count Dracula
  - Louis Flannery as Young Dracula
- Lorna Wilde as Countess Dracula
- Tina Simmons as Ghoul
- Derek Woodward as Werewolf

== Production ==
Son of Dracula was made during a period when Ringo Starr, in between occasional single releases and session work, was concentrating on filmmaking and acting. Two films in which he had starred, 200 Motels and Blindman, had been released at the end of 1971, and before starting on this one, he had just finished work on his directorial debut, the T. Rex documentary Born to Boogie.

As well as producing Son of Dracula, Starr appears as Merlin the Magician, who follows the birth and rise of young Count Downe, played by Harry Nilsson. Starr and Nilsson were longtime friends, and the ex-Beatle had recently played drums on Nilsson's 1972 album Son of Schmilsson, which had spoofed horror movie motifs. A few months after those sessions, in August 1972, Starr decided to make a rock and roll Dracula movie (originally titled Count Downe), and invited Nilsson to come on board. At first, Nilsson thought the whole idea must have come from his recent album; as it turned out, Starr had not followed its release, and until then-wife Maureen Starkey brought him a copy, he did not even know that Son of Schmilsson had already used a similar theme.

Freddie Francis later said "at the end of the film I opted out. I said Ringo look, I'm ill at the moment, you better cut the film yourself. He had made it with a lot of his friends and that, the less said the better."

== Release ==
Filming was completed by November 1972, but Son of Dracula had to wait a year and a half for release. Soon after completion, Starr called in Graham Chapman, who was writing with Douglas Adams at the time and had been working on a proposed (but eventually unfilmed) television special for Ringo. Along with Chapman's other regular collaborator, Bernard McKenna, they were asked to write a whole new script to be dubbed over the film's lacklustre dialogue, and they recorded an alternative, Pythonesque soundtrack, but the whole idea was then shelved. Later, attempts were made to market the movie, but as Starr later said, ‘No one would take it.’

=== Reception ===
The film was poorly received. In 2014, Ultimate Rock Classic journalist John Giles stated "Creative discipline, in other words, was in short supply – and Son of Dracula needed plenty." Showings over the years have been limited to midnight movies and similar outlets. No official home video release has ever been made.

== Soundtrack album ==
Son of Dracula

Soundtrack album by Harry Nilsson
- Released: 1 April 1974 (U.S.); 24 May 1974 (U.K.)
- Recorded: 1971–72; September 1972; Trident Studios, London
- Genre: Pop music
- Length: 40:00
- Label: Rapple (RCA/Apple)
- Producers: Harry Nilsson, Ringo Starr, Richard Perry

Harry Nilsson chronology
A Little Touch of Schmilsson in the Night (1973)	Son of Dracula (1974)	Pussy Cats (1974)

Singles from Son of Dracula
- 1. "Daybreak" Released: 25 March 1974 (U.S.); 7 June 1974 (U.K.)

Soundtrack
Review scores
Source	Rating
AllMusic	2/5 stars
The Essential Rock Discography	4/10

The Son of Dracula album includes Nilsson songs that were showcased in the film, as well as some instrumental tracks composed by Paul Buckmaster and portions of dialogue used as bridging sequences. All the song tracks except one are from the previously released Nilsson Schmilsson and Son of Schmilsson albums.

The only new song, "Daybreak", was recorded in London sometime in September 1972, during a break in filming. Joining Nilsson and Starr on the sessions at Trident Studios were the likes of Klaus Voormann, Peter Frampton, Bobby Keys and Jim Price, once again, as well as George Harrison on cowbell. Jim Price, along with pianist Gary Wright and orchestral arrangers Paul Buckmaster and Del Newman, also provided new, incidental music, some of which appeared in the film only. The U.S. LP release of the soundtrack included a T-shirt iron-on advertising the film, and a companion songbook included a reproduction of the film poster. The single version of "Daybreak" edited out the words "it's pissing me off" (referring to daylight), repeating the lyric "it's making me cough" instead, and the fadeout is longer than on any LP or CD release of the song. The single peaked at number 39 on the Billboard Hot 100 but did not chart at all on the UK Singles Chart. The album itself fared even worse, non-charting on the UK Albums Chart and climbing no higher than number 106 on the American Billboard 200.

"Daybreak" was later covered by Nilsson friend and former Monkee Micky Dolenz. A version with completely new lyrics in German was sung as "Hamburg im Regen" by Mary Roos.

=== Album track listing ===
1. "It Is He Who Will Be King" (Paul Buckmaster) – 3:07
2. "Daybreak" (Harry Nilsson) – 2:43
3. "At My Front Door" (Ewart Abner, John Moore) – 2:40
4. "Count Downe Meets Merlin and Amber" (Buckmaster) – 2:10
5. "The Moonbeam Song" (Nilsson) – 3:20
6. "Perhaps This Is All a Dream" (Buckmaster) – :47
7. "Remember (Christmas)" (Nilsson) – 4:09
8. "Intro; Without You" (Pete Ham, Tom Evans) – 3:47
9. "The Count's Vulnerability" (Buckmaster) – 2:10
10. "Down" (Nilsson) – 3:07
11. "Frankenstein, Merlin and the Operation" (John Taverner) – 3:20
12. "Jump Into the Fire" (Nilsson) – 3:16
13. "The Abdication of Count Downe" (Buckmaster) – 1:10
14. "The End (Moonbeam)" (Nilsson) – 0:49

== Personnel ==
- Harry Nilsson : Vocals, piano, electric piano, mellotron
- Jim Price : Organ, horns arrangements, trumpet, trombone
- Gene Cipriano : Horns
- Bobby Keys : Saxophone, tenor sax
- Paul Buckmaster : Strings and horns arrangements and conducting
- The Pop Arts String Quartet : Strings
- Peter Frampton : Guitar, electric guitar
- Chris Spedding : Guitar, electric guitar, bouzouki
- John Uribe : Acoustic Guitar, Lead guitar
- Klaus Voormann : Acoustic guitar, bass guitar
- Herbie Flowers : Bass guitar
- Jim Webb : Acoustic piano
- Gary Wright : Piano
- Nicky Hopkins : Piano
- Ringo Starr : Drums
- Jim Keltner : Drums
- Jim Gordon : Drums, percussions
- Ray Cooper : Percussions, congas
- George Harrison : Cowbell
