= Earthly Possessions (novel) =

1977 novel by Anne Tyler

- First edition cover
- Author: Anne Tyler
- Language: English
- Publisher: Knopf
- Publication date: 1977
- Publication place: United States
- Media type: Print (Hardcover and Paperback)
- Pages: 197
- ISBN: 9780394411477
- OCLC: OL24950680M
- Dewey Decimal: 813/.5/4
- LC Class: PZ4.T979 Ear PS3570.Y45 (76041222 )

Earthly Possessions is a 1977 novel by Anne Tyler. This, Tyler's seventh novel, followed Celestial Navigation and Searching for Caleb and preceded her award-winning novels Morgan's Passing, Dinner at the Homesick Restaurant, The Accidental Tourist, and Breathing Lessons.

== Plot ==
Thirty-five-year-old Charlotte Emory has felt trapped her whole life in Clarion, Maryland—first by her embarrassingly eccentric parents, then by her preacher-husband whom she married too young, and eventually by "his variously afflicted brothers, a daughter who won't answer to her own name, a house full of refugees, an impossible clutter." She finally decides to run away from it all, rid herself of her "earthly possessions," and start over. When she goes to the bank to withdraw funds for her escape, she gets taken hostage during a holdup. Prison escapee Jake Simms forces Charlotte into a stolen car and they head for Florida.

"Earthly Possessions…contains a chilling portrait of a habitual criminal, Jake Simms, Jr., who blames every destructive and chaotic act of his own on someone else. He kidnaps our heroine, the surpassingly amiable Charlotte Emory because while he was robbing a bank a bystander happened to produce a gun. "I could be clean free," he tells his victim, "and you safe home with your kids by now if it wasn't for him. Guy like that ought to be locked up." As the chase continues, and the kidnapping lengthens into a kind of marriage, he persuades himself, "it ain't me keeping you it's them. If they would quit hounding me then we could go our separate ways…" This is perfect loser psychology, the mental technology of digging a bottomless pit; but Anne Tyler would have us believe that Jake is saved from falling in by the doll-like apparition of a wee seventeen-year-old girl he has impregnated, Mindy Callender."

Jake Simms' stated ain, in additions to avoiding arrest, is to retrieve Mindy from a home for unwed mothers, where she is pregnant with his child. During this period, Charlotte Emory remains with Jake and Mindy for a time after being taken hostage. Prior to these event, Charlotte had withdrawn her savings with the intention of leaving her husband, reflecting earlier, similarly unplanned attempts to run away. Her involvement in the situation places her in another uncertain set of circumstances, which suggests a shift in her perspective by the end of the novel.

== Reviews ==
In 1977, John Leonard wrote, "That part of Earthly Possessions spent on the road--gas stations and junk food--amounts to a Rabbit, Run without the Updike epiphanies. The rest is skillful flashback....I admit not being entirely sympathetic to the wry fatalism she proposes, to the notion that we travel enough in our heads to make leaving home almost redundant. Celestial Navigation (1974) and Searching for Caleb (1976) were more satisfying novels. But a taste of Anne Tyler, once acquired, is a splendid addiction."

John Updike reviewed the novel in The New Yorker: "Anne Tyler, in her seventh novel, 'Earthly Possessions', continues to demonstrate a remarkable talent and, for a writer of her acuity, an unusual temperament....Small towns and pinched minds hold room enough for her; she is at peace in the semi-countrified, semi-plasticized northern-Southern America where she and her characters live. Out of this peace flow her unmistakable strengths—serene firm tone; her smoothly spun plots; her apparently inexhaustible access to the personalities of her imagining; her infectious delight in "the smell of beautiful, everyday life"; her lack of any trace of intellectual or political condescension—and her one possible weakness: a tendency to leave the reader just where she found him....Charlotte Emory...belongs to what is becoming a familiar class of Anne Tyler heroines: women admirably active in the details of living yet alarmingly passive in the large curve of their lives—riders on male-generated events, who nevertheless give those events a certain blessing, a certain feasibility."

== Adaptation for TV ==
- Earthly Possessions (TV) (1999) stars Susan Sarandon, Stephen Dorff, and Elisabeth Moss. "The eventual romance [between Jake and Charlotte is] an element invented for the movie. [It] doesn't disrupt the original sentiment of the story, but could easily have been left out without compromising the emotional development of the characters."
