= Accidental Tourist =

Accidental Tourist may refer to:

- The Accidental Tourist, 1985 novel by Anne Tyler
- The Accidental Tourist (film), 1988 film by Lawrence Kasdan
- Tourist guy, an internet meme of altered photos showing a tourist in unusual locations
