= A Slipping-Down Life (novel) =

1970 novel by Anne Tyler

- First edition cover, New York, 1970
- Author: Anne Tyler
- Language: English
- Genre: Novel
- Publisher: Knopf
- Publication date: 1970
- Publication place: United States
- English publication date: 1970
- Media type: Print (hardback & paperback)
- Pages: 214 pp
- ISBN: 9780394445731
- OCLC: 36205678
- Dewey Decimal: 813/.5/4
- LC Class: PZ4.T979 Sl PS3570.Y45 (76098663 )
- Preceded by: The Tin Can Tree (1965)
- Followed by: The Clock Winder (1972)

A Slipping-Down Life is a 1970 novel by Anne Tyler.

== Plot summary ==
Evie Decker is a shy, slightly plump teenager, lonely and silent. But her quiet life is shattered when she hears the voice of Drumstrings Casey on the radio and becomes instantly attracted to him. She manages to meet him, bursting out of her lonely shell—and into the attentive gaze of the intangible man who becomes all too real....

== Reviews ==
A Slipping-Down Life was reviewed by Kirkus Reviews and The New York Times.

== Adaptation ==
A Slipping-Down Life was adapted into a film of the same name, released in 1999.
