= Earthly Possessions =

Earthly Possessions may refer to:

- Earthly Possessions (novel), a 1977 novel by Anne Tyler
- Earthly Possessions (film), a 1999 film, adapted from the novel
