= The Beginner's Goodbye =

2012 novel by Anne Tyler

- First edition cover, New York, 2012
- Author: Anne Tyler
- Language: English
- Genre: Novel
- Publisher: Knopf
- Publication date: 2012
- Publication place: United States
- English publication date: April 3, 2012
- Media type: Print (hardback & paperback)
- Pages: 208 pp
- ISBN: 9780307957276
- OCLC: 745979743
- Dewey Decimal: 813/.54
- LC Class: PS3570.Y45 B44 2012 (2011033507)
- Preceded by: Noah's Compass

The Beginner's Goodbye is a 2012 novel by Anne Tyler.

== Plot summary ==
Aaron Woolcott is an editor for a publisher of books with the beginner in mind. After the death of Aaron's wife, Dorothy, he thinks there should be a beginner's guide to dealing with the death of a spouse.

== Reviews ==
- Michiko Kakutani:"Haunted by Life, Haunted by Wife", New York Times (April 5, 2012).
- Julia Glass: "Grieving Lessons", New York Times (May 4, 2012).
