= Esquire Jauchem =

American stage and television producer

- Born: October 20, 1947 (age 79); Akron, Ohio, U.S.
- Occupations: Producer, Director, Writer, and designer
- Years active: 1970–present

Esquire Jauchem (born October 20, 1947) is a producer, director, writer, and designer working in theater, opera, ballet, film, and video. In 1971 he founded The Boston Repertory Theater. In 1975, he adapted and directed the world premiere of the stage version of Harry Nilsson's The Point! starring David Morse as the character Oblio. He has produced over 1,000 television programs, most recently the Supervising Producer of Clean House starring Niecy Nash and the Co-Executive Producer of Home Made Simple starring Paige Davis. Both of those shows received Emmy nominations.

== Early life ==
Jauchem was born in Akron, Ohio, where his father was a machinist at Goodyear Tire and his mother was a beauty queen and housewife. His acting and directing career started in his grandmother's garage where he staged mini-theatrical events. His maternal grandparents were from Zics, Hungary, the paternal side from Biermansdorf, Switzerland. Jauchem attended Harvey S. Firestone High School and went to The Defiance College where he studied theology, made his first film, and became deeply involved in the theater department led by Professor William Curtis. In the summer of 1964 he was an actor with the Defiance College Players performing in Barnstable, Massachusetts. After graduating from college, he moved to Boston to attend Emerson College, but very shortly became involved in the Opera Company of Boston productions led by world-famous impresario Sarah Caldwell who offered him a full-time job.

== Theatre ==
At the age of twenty-four Jauchem founded the Boston Repertory Theatre which, over the next ten years, became the most successful local theater company in Boston, originating over 40 shows with James Kirkwood Jr., Tommy Tune, Viveca Lindfors and Dick Shawn among the known performers, and kickstarting the careers of newcomers including David Morse (an original founding member of the Company). The resident acting company performed several plays in true rotating repertory, often two different shows in the same day. The Boston Rep built the first new theatre in the Boston Theater District in thirty years at One Boylston Place and opened it for the national bi-centennial in 1976 with the world premiere of Kurt Vonnegut's Player Piano.

== Opera ==
Jauchem was also the Associate Director and production Administrator of the Opera Company of Boston with world-renowned conductor and director, Sarah Caldwell. He helped her stage many American premieres including The Trojans by Berlioz, Russlan and Ludmilla by Glinka, The Icebreak by Sir Michael Tippett, and the epic, War and Peace by Prokofiev (which featured the entire Boston Rep acting company in key, non-singing roles). Opera singers with whom he worked include Beverly Sills, Régine Crespin, Plácido Domingo, James McCracken, Donald Gramm, Victoria de los Ángeles, and Shirley Verrett. Jauchem also became known for creating elaborate special effects Sarah Caldwell's productions and also often appeared onstage in the productions.

Moving to New York, he partnered with Gregory Meeh to establish Jauchem & Meeh Special Effects, carrying his theatrical background into a decades-long career supplying stage effects for opera and theater. The firm provided storms, explosions, and stage illusions for numerous productions, including the scenic destruction of Troy, Moscow, and the Temple of Solomon, as well as the staging for the theatrical burning of Beverly Sills at the stake.

== Hollywood ==
Moving to Venice Beach, California, Jauchem became involved in electronic media where he has produced and/or directed over one thousand episodes of television for NBC, CBC, Spike, UPN, E! Entertainment, Style, Logo, and The Oprah Winfrey Network. He was the Supervising Producer for the comedy/makeover show Clean House starring Niecy Nash. The show was a high-performing program for the network for several years, resulting in two Emmy nominations for Jauchem, and generated a spin-off special "The Messiest House" on Style.

He continued his work in the theatre producing, directing and designing scenery, lighting and costumes including another production of The Point! and The Little Prince starring David Morse as The Aviator.

== Recent projects ==
In recent years he has written and directed multimedia stage tributes to Paula Vogel, Marsha Norman and David Henry Hwang for William Inge Theater Festival and was most recently the Supervising Producer of RuPaul’s Drag U on Logo TV and the Co-Executive Producer / Showrunner of Home Made Simple starring Paige Davis on the Oprah Winfrey Network that was nominated for an Emmy.

He is in currently pre-production on a short film based on award-winning playwright, David Henry Hwang’s play, Bondage. He is developing an independent feature film Down by the River slated to star David Morse and Kimberly Elise, screenplay by Gerald Berns, based on a play by William Curtis. Jauchem is also developing a cabaret style musical based on the music of Stew and Heidi Rodewald and writing an adaptation of "The Mad Woman of Chaillot" set on the Venice Beach Boardwalk.

== Occupations ==
- Founder and Artistic Director of the Boston Repertory Theatre
- Associate Director and production Administrator of the Opera Company of Boston with Director Sarah Caldwell
- Co-Founder of Jauchem & Meeh Special Effects (with Gregory Meeh), which is known for its work in opera, on Broadway, and in Las Vegas.
- General Manager of The Big Apple Circus, NYC
- Co-Producer "American – Soviet Festival: Making Music Together", Sarah Caldwell, Director

== Selected works ==
=== TV/Film ===
Title	Venue	Position	Notes
Bondage by David Henry Hwang	Los Angeles	Screenplay / Director	Currently in Pre-production
Down by the River Screenplay by Gerald Berns	Los Angeles	Director	based on the play, Lester Sims Retires Today by William Curtis, currently in development
Home Made Simple	Oprah Winfrey Network	Co-Executive Producer / Showrunner	Starring Paige Davis, Emmy Nomination
RuPaul's Drag U	Logo Network	Supervising Producer	Starring RuPaul
Clean House	E! Entertainment, Style Network	Supervising Producer	Starring Niecy Nash, 65 episodes
Messiest Home in the Country	E Entertainment, Style Network	Supervising Producer	nominated for an Emmy.
I Hate My Job	Spike Network	Director	hosted by Al Sharpton
Ocean Drive	USA Networks	Executive Producer/Director	Starring Hunter Reno
America's Most Wanted	Fox	Segment Producer	
Livin' Large	NBC	Story Coordinator	Syndicated Magazine Show
Vegas Life	USA Networks	Producer/Director	
Anatomy of Crime	Court TV	Sr. Producer	26 – One-Hour Specials
Strange Universe	United Television – Rysher Entertainment	Coordinating Producer	Five 1/2 hour pilot segments
Movie Magic	Discovery Channel	Writer/Director	
TrialWatch	NBC Pilot and Series	Producer	130 episodes
Divorce Court	CBS & Syndicated	Supervising Producer	390 episodes
Divorce Court	CBS & Syndicated	Producer	260 episodes
The Krypton Factor	NBC	Line Producer	34 episodes

=== Theater ===
Title	Venue	Position	Notes
Theatre's Golden Warrior	William Inge Theatre Festival	Writer/Director	Tribute to David Henry Hwang
Traveler in the Light	William Inge Theatre Festival	Writer/Director	Tribute to Marsha Norman
A Hot Waltz with Paula	William Inge Theatre Festival	Writer/Director	Tribute to Paula Vogel
Rondelet: Scenes of Seduction	Boston Repertory Theatre	Director	based on Reigen by Schnitzler
October 20 at Night	Boston Repertory Theatre	Producer	American Premiere Israeli play be Yeshua Sobol
My Mother, My Son	Boston Repertory Theatre	Producer	with Viveca Lindfors and Chris Tabori
The Point! by Harry Nilsson	Boston Repertory Theatre; Trinity Square Repertory Theatre, Providence;Chapel Court Theater, Hollywood	Stage Adaptation / Director	World Premiere Musical/LA Premiere; Nominated as Musical of the Year
The Reason We Eat by Israel Horowitz	Boston Repertory Theatre	Producer	Boston Premiere
Nightclub Cantana by Elizabeth Swados	Boston Repertory Theatre; Charles Playhouse	Producer	with original NY cast
P.S. Your Cat is Dead by James Kirkwood	Boston Repertory Theatre; Charles Playhouse	Producer	
Player Piano by Kurt Vonnegut	Boston Repertory Theatre	Producer	World Premiere
Ichabod	Boston Repertory Theatre	Producer	Original Musical Starring Tommy Tune
I Am a Woman	Boston Repertory Theatre; Charles Playhouse	Producer	Starring Viveca Lindfors
The Night Thoreau Spent in Jail	Boston Repertory Theatre	Director	Starring David Morse
The Little Prince	Boston Repertory Theatre; Charles Playhouse; Los Angeles; Berkeley; & San Francisco	Producer/Director	Starring David Morse
When You Comin' Back Red Ryder	Boston Repertory Theatre	Producer	Boston Premiere in Harvard Square
Home Free by Landford Wilson	Boston Repertory Theatre	Director	Boston Premiere
The Second Greatest Entertainer	Boston Repertory Theatre	Producer	Starring Dick Shawn
"Grandma's in the Cellar"	Boston Repertory Theatre	Writer/Director	World Premiere
The Thirteen Clocks by James Thurber	Boston Repertory Theatre	Producer	World Premiere
A Hatful of Rain by Michael V. Gazzo	Boston Repertory Theatre	Director	
Luv by Murray Schisgal	Boston Repertory Theatre	Producer	
The Romantics by Edmond Rostand	Boston Repertory Theatre, Hyannis & Boston	Director	
Uncle Vanya by Anton Chekhov	Boston Repertory Theatre	Producer	
The Knights of the Round Table by Jean Cocteau	Boston Repertory Theatre	Director	
Animal Farm by George Orwell	Boston Repertory Theatre	Producer	Boston Premiere
The Beautiful People by William Saroyan	Boston Repertory Theatre, Hyannis	Director	
The Knights of the Round Table	Boston Repertory Theatre, Hyannis	Director	
A Child's Christmas in Wales by Dylan Thomas	Boston Repertory Theatre	Producer	
Lenya: Life to Legend	LA County Museum of Art	Producer	Production and Lighting Design
Trials of Peter the Hebrew (Opera )	LA County Museum of Art	Producer	Production and Lighting Design
Assassins by Sondheim/Weidman	The Los Angeles Repertory Company	General Manager	at LATC
The Hostage by Brendan Behan	The Los Angeles Repertory Company	Producer	Lighting Design
The Messiah by Martin Sherman	The Los Angeles Repertory Company	Producer	Scenic & Lighting Design
Methuselah by George Bernard Shaw	The Los Angeles Repertory Company	Scenic & Lighting Design	

=== Opera ===
Title	Venue	Position	Notes
The Daughter of the Regiment	Opera Company of Boston	Assistant Director	Starring Beverly Sills
The Good Soldier Schweik	Opera Company of Boston	Assistant Director	American Premiere
La Bohème	Opera Company of Boston	Associate Director	starring Ilona Tokady
Mass by Leonard Bernstein	Opera Company of Boston	Associate Director	Boston Premiere
Les Troyens	Opera Company of Boston	Associate Director	American Premiere starring Regine Crespin
The Flying Dutchman	Opera Company of Boston, Wolf Trap Farm Park	Associate Director	starring Simon Estes
Aida	Opera Company of Boston	Associate Director	Starring Shirley Verrett and James McCracken
War and Peace	Opera Company of Boston, Wolf Trap Farm Park	Associate Director	American Premiere starring Donald Gramm
The Vamprye	Opera Company of Boston	Associate Director	Starring Brent Ellis
The Good Soldier Schweik	Opera Company of Boston	Associate Director	American Premiere
Die Fledermaus	Opera Company of Boston	Associate Director	Beverly Sills, Donald Gramm, Victor Borge
Hansel and Gretel	Opera Company of Boston	Associate Director	Starring Rosiland Elias
Madame Butterfly	Opera Company of Boston, Wolf Trap Farm Park	Associate Director	Designed by Ming Cho Lee
The Icebreak by Sir Michael Tippett,	Opera Company of Boston	Associate Director	American Premiere
The Barber of Seville	Opera Company of Boston	Associate Director	Starring Beverly Sills and Alan Titus
La Vide Breve	Opera Company of Boston	Associate Director	StarrinbgVictoria De Los Angeles
Tosca	Opera Company of Boston	Associate Director	Starring Magda Olivera
The Impresario		Opera New England	Staging Director
La Traviata	Opera Company of Boston, Opera New England	Director & designer	
Falstaff	Opera Company of Boston, NYC Opera, Los Angeles Tour	Associate Director	Starring Donald Gramm
Don Pasquale	Opera Company of Boston, Houston Grand Opera	Associate Director	Starring Beverly Sills and Donald Gramm
The Marriage of Figaro	Wolf Trap Farm Park	Associated Director	Directed by Donald Gramm

=== Festivals/casino/tours ===
Title	Venue	Position	Notes
"Burning Man Festival"	Black Rock City	Producer/designer	Center Camp Bubble Lounge 6 years
"Carnevale!"	Venice Beach	Producer	Street festival for 8 years
American-Soviet Festival	Boston, Massachusetts	Producing director	300 Soviet and 400 American artists
The Big Apple Circus	NYC and on tour	Managing director	
Harmonia Mundi	Irvine, California	Production & lighting design	With the Dalai Lama on the night that he won the Nobel Peace Prize
California Dream Men	Tour of Germany	Production stage manager	Directed by Walter Painter
Ballet Trocadero de Monte Carlo	Tours of Russia and Japan	Lighting design	
Flash! A Magical, Mystical Adventure	Gold River Casino	Director, designer: scenery, costumes, lighting	Magic and dance show
