= Boston Repertory Theatre =

The Boston Repertory Theatre was founded in Hyannis, on Cape Cod, in the summer of 1971 by Esquire Jauchem; the company was dissolved in 1978. Jauchem recruited a group of local theater artists to form a true repertory acting company (performing several plays each week with the same actors). Their first season was presented as a summer stock company in Hyannis, Massachusetts performing William Saroyan's The Beautiful People, Edmond Rostand's The Romantics, and Jean Cocteau's The Knights of the Round Table in weekly performances that summer.

== History ==
The company then moved to Boston where they performed for the next decade becoming the most popular local theater ensemble, presenting over 40 productions varying from classics to world premieres of new works including highly successful productions of St. Exupery's The Little Prince, Harry Nilsson's The Point!, Kurt Vonnegut's Player Piano, and James Kirkwood's P.S. Your Cat is Dead . At times, the company had productions running in three theaters and The Rep (as it was locally known) converted the Ace Recording Studio into the first new theater in the historic Boston Theater District in over 25 years.

The Rep eventually became the only resident Actor's Equity company in Boston with as many as four different plays being performed by the same group of actors on a weekly basis. It was the only American theater company in a major city carrying on the British tradition of true rotating repertory with a company of actors on a year-round basis. The company toured across America as far east as Nantucket, west to San Francisco, North to Maine and south to Florida. The entire company was featured in the Opera Company of Boston's American premiere of Prokofiev's epic War and Peace conducted and directed by Sarah Caldwell.

The original founders of the Boston Rep were Esquire Jauchem, Pierre Vuilleumier, Wendy Krauss, Judy Truncer, David Zucker, Virginia Feingold, David Morse, Tom Bower, George Winn-Abbott, and Minerva Grey (the actress cat). The first four who were considered the core people, were in school together at Defiance College in Ohio. The company later grew to include Gerald Bernstein, Martha Burtt, Joe Wilkins, Dorothy Meyer, Robin Brecker, Greg Meeh, Susan Palmer-Person, and scores of local actors. Guest artists included Tommy Tune, Viveca Lindfors, Dick Shawn, Kris Tabori, Ted Davis, Mary-Ann Plunkett, and Elizabeth Swados.
