= David Morse =

American actor (born 1953)

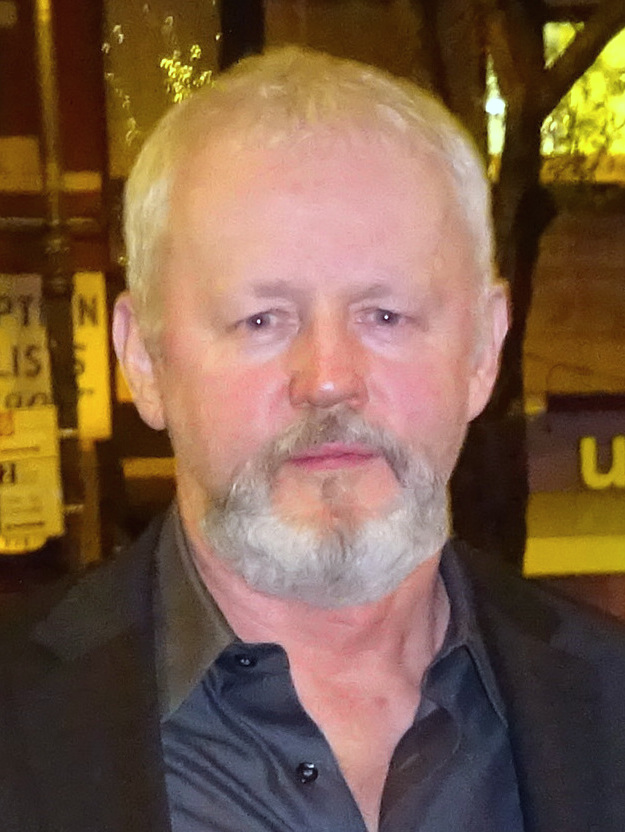
- Morse in 2013
- Born: David Bowditch Morse; October 11, 1953 (age 72); Beverly, Massachusetts, U.S.
- Education: William Esper Studio
- Occupation: Actor
- Years active: 1980–present
- Spouse: Susan Wheeler Duff (m. 1982)
- Children: 3

David Bowditch Morse (born October 11, 1953) is an American actor. Morse became widely known for his role as Dr. Jack "Boomer" Morrison in the NBC medical drama series St. Elsewhere (1982–88), and he has had roles in The Negotiator, The Good Son, Horns, Contact, The Green Mile, Dancer in the Dark, Disturbia, The Hurt Locker, The Long Kiss Goodnight, The Rock and 12 Monkeys.

In 2006, Morse had a recurring role as Detective Michael Tritter on the medical drama series House, for which he received an Emmy Award nomination. He portrayed George Washington in the 2008 HBO miniseries John Adams, which garnered him a second Emmy nomination. He received acclaim for his portrayal of Uncle Peck on the Off-Broadway play How I Learned to Drive, earning a Drama Desk Award and Obie Award. He has had success on Broadway, portraying James "Sharky" Harkin in The Seafarer. From 2010 to 2013, he portrayed Terry Colson, an honest police officer in a corrupt New Orleans police department, on the HBO series Treme. Morse appeared in the WGN America series Outsiders (2016–17), the Showtime miniseries Escape at Dannemora (2018), the Netflix comedy drama series The Chair (2021), and the Apple TV mystery series The Last Thing He Told Me (2023-2026).

== Early life ==
Morse was born October 11, 1953, in Beverly, Massachusetts, the son of Jacquelyn Morse, a teacher, and Charles Morse, a salesman. He was raised in Essex, Massachusetts and Hamilton, Massachusetts. As a teenager, he was confirmed in the Episcopal Church, and he has said that he continues to pray daily into adulthood. His middle name, Bowditch, comes from mathematician Nathaniel Bowditch.

== Career ==
=== Early career in theater ===
After graduating from high school in 1971, Morse was invited by Esquire Jauchem, who had directed him in one of his school plays, to audition for the repertory theater he was helping form in Boston, the Boston Repertory Company. Morse became a member that summer at age 17 and spent six years performing there while living in the Fort Hill section of Roxbury.

In 1975, Jauchem, by then the artistic director of the Boston Repertory Theater, adapted and directed a stage musical version of The Point! that starred Morse as Oblio. The production later toured to the Trinity Square Repertory Company in Providence. In the late 1970s, Morse moved from Boston to New York to further his stage career with the Circle Repertory Company and to study acting at the William Esper Studio.

=== Film and television ===
In 1980, Morse made his theatrical film debut in the drama Inside Moves. Morse was listed as one of the twelve most "Promising New Actors of 1980" in John A. Willis's Screen World, Vol. 32.

Morse's big break came in 1982 when he was cast in the television medical drama St. Elsewhere. He played Dr. Jack "Boomer" Morrison, a young physician who is forced to deal with the death of his wife and the struggles of being a single parent professional.

Morse appeared in a number of supporting roles following St. Elsewhere. He is quoted as saying, "I made the decision that I didn't care if there was any money in the role or not. I had to find roles that were different from what I had been doing." His turn in Desperate Hours as antagonist showed a darker side of Morse. He later starred in The Indian Runner and The Crossing Guard. He has appeared in three adaptations of Stephen King stories: The Langoliers, Hearts in Atlantis, and The Green Mile. He was a guest star on Homicide: Life on the Street, playing a racist cousin of Detective Tim Bayliss.

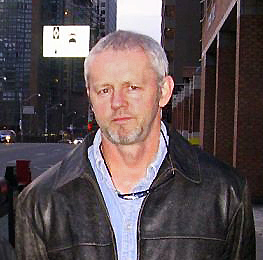
Morse in 2005

In 2002, Morse starred as Mike Olshansky, an ex-Philadelphia police officer turned cab driver, in the television film Hack. For his role in the 2002 crime-drama film Shuang Tong, Morse was nominated as Best Supporting Actor in the Golden Horse Awards, the first ever nomination for an English-speaking actor. He appeared as suspicious neighbor Mr. Turner in the 2007 thriller Disturbia. Film critic and commentator John Podhoretz wrote that Morse is a "largely unsung character actor who enlivens and deepens every movie fortunate enough to have him in the cast."

In 2006, Morse received a phone call from David Shore, who had previously worked with him on the Hack series. Shore asked him if he would be interested in having a guest role on House. When Morse watched the show, he could not understand why people enjoyed it because he believed "this House guy is a total jerk." When he told some of his friends about the offer, however, their excited reactions convinced him to accept the role. Morse portrayed Michael Tritter, a detective with a vendetta against Dr. House. He earned his first Emmy Award nomination for his work on the series.

In 2008, Morse portrayed George Washington in the HBO miniseries John Adams, for which his nose was made bigger with prosthetics. Morse commented, "The first thing that comes to mind is my nose; it was my big idea to do that nose. We didn't have a lot of time, because they asked me to do this about three weeks before they started shooting, and I just kept looking at these portraits and thinking 'this man's face is so commanding.' And I did not feel that my face was very commanding in the way his was. So I convinced them that we should try the nose, and we tried it on, and everybody went, 'Wow, that's Washington.'" Morse's portrayal earned him his second Emmy Award nomination. He also portrays Washington in voice form as part of The Hall of Presidents show in Walt Disney World Resort's Magic Kingdom.

Morse has stated that out of all of the films he has done, his favorites are The Green Mile, The Crossing Guard, and The Indian Runner.

In 2010, he guest starred in two episodes of the HBO drama series Treme as Lt. Terry Colson of the New Orleans Police Department. He was promoted to series regular starting with the show's second season, which began in April 2011. Later that year, Morse won the best actor award at the Karlovy Vary International Film Festival for his role in Collaborator. He played an ex-CIA agent in the film World War Z (2013). He played the late NFL player Mike Webster in the biographical sports drama Concussion (2015).

=== Stage ===
In addition to performing in films and on television, Morse has continued to appear on stage. For his performance in the 1997 Off-Broadway production of Paula Vogel's Pulitzer Prize-winning drama How I Learned to Drive, he received an Obie Award, a Drama League Award, a Drama Desk Award, and a Lucille Lortel Award. That same year, he played Father Barry in the play adaptation of On the Waterfront. From 2007 to 2008, Morse appeared on Broadway in Conor McPherson's play The Seafarer. He received a Tony Award nomination for his role in the 2018 Broadway revival of The Iceman Cometh.

== Personal life ==
Morse has three younger sisters and had one stepsister. He has been married to actress and author of The Habit, Susan Wheeler Duff Morse since 1982. They have one daughter and twin sons. After losing their home in the 1994 Northridge earthquake, Morse and his family moved to Philadelphia, Pennsylvania. Morse has food sensitivities and has to personally prepare almost all food he eats.

== Filmography ==
=== Film ===
List of David Morse film credits
Year	Title	Role	Notes
1980	Inside Moves	Jerry Maxwell	
1982	Max Dugan Returns	Shoe Store Cop	
1987	Personal Foul	Ben	
1990	Desperate Hours	Albert	
1991	The Indian Runner Cry in the wild: The taking of Peggy Ann	Bicycle Pete	
1993	The Good Son	Jack Evans	
1994	The Getaway	Jim "Deer" Jackson	
1994	Magic Kid II	Jack	
1995	The Taming Power of the Small		
1995	The Crossing Guard	John Booth	Nominated – Best Supporting Male at the Independent Spirit Awards
1995	12 Monkeys	Dr. Peters	
1996	The Rock	Major Tom Baxter	
1996	Extreme Measures	FBI Agent Frank Hare	
1996	The Long Kiss Goodnight	Luke / Daedalus	
1997	George B	George	
1997	Contact	Ted Arroway	
1998	The Legend of Pig Eye		
1998	The Negotiator	Adam Beck	
1999	Crazy in Alabama	Dove Bullis	
1999	The Green Mile	Brutus "Brutal" Howell	Nominated – Screen Actors Guild Award for Outstanding Performance by a Cast in a Motion Picture
2000	Bait	Edgar Clenteen	
2000	Dancer in the Dark	Bill Houston	
2000	Proof of Life	Peter Bowman	
2001	Diary of a City Priest	Father John McNamee	
2001	Hearts in Atlantis	Adult Bobby Garfield	
2002	The Slaughter Rule	Gideon "Gid" Ferguson	
2002	Double Vision	Kevin Richter	Nominated – Best Supporting Actor at the Golden Horse Film Festival
2005	Down in the Valley	Wade	
2005	Nearing Grace	Shep Nearing	
2005	Dreamer	Everett Palmer	
2006	A.W.O.L.	Major Cliff Marquette	
2006	16 Blocks	Det. Frank Nugent	
2007	Hounddog	Lou	
2007	Disturbia	Robert Turner	
2008	Passengers	Arkin	
2009	The Hurt Locker	Colonel Reed	Gotham Independent Film Award for Best Ensemble Cast; WAFCA Award for Best Ensemble
2010	Mother and Child	Tom	
2010	Shanghai	Richard Astor	
2010	Mint Julep	Karl	
2010	The Pond	Adam 11	Short film
2011	Drive Angry	Webster	
2011	Collaborator	Gus Williams	Karlovy Vary International Film Festival Award for Best Actor; Nominated – Best Actor in a Leading Role at the Canadian Screen Awards
2012	The Odd Life of Timothy Green	James "Big Jim" Green Sr.	
2012	Yellow	Psychologist	
2013	Horns	Dale Williams	
2013	McCanick	Eugene "Mack" McCanick	Also producer
2013	World War Z	Ex-CIA Agent	
2013	Winter in the Blood	Airplane Man	
2015	The Boy	John Henley	
2015	Concussion	Mike Webster	
2017	Trouble	Gerry	
2017	Thank You for Your Service	Fred Gusman	
2018	Slender Man	Jerry Newsman	
2021	The Virtuoso	The Deputy	
2024	Cabrini	Archbishop Corrigan	
2025	The Gettysburg Address	Abraham Lincoln	Voice
2025	Looking Through Water	Leo McKay	
2025	Broken Land	Carson Tidwell	
2026	Mayday	Harold Kelly	

=== Television ===
List of David Morse television credits
Year	Title	Role	Notes
1981	Nurse	Kevin Mallory	Episode: "Equal Opportunity"
1981	Our Family Business	Phil	Television film
1982–1988	St. Elsewhere	Dr. Jack Morrison	137 episodes Directed episodes: "A Coupla White Dummies Sitting Around Talking", "Handoff"
1983	Prototype	Michael	Television film
1984	Shattered Vows	Father Tim	Television film
1985	When Dreams Come True	Robert Wynton	Television film
1987	Place at the Table	Tom Williams	Television film
1987	KnowZone	Host	13 episodes
1987	Six Against the Rock	Marvin Hubbard	Television film
1987	Downpayment on Murder	Det. Jackson	Television film
1988	Winnie	Thomas	Television film
1989	Brotherhood of the Rose	Chris / Remus	Television film
1989	Cross of Fire	Klell Henry	Television film
1989	Friday the 13th: The Series	—N/a	Wrote and directed episode: "A Friend to the End"
1989	Midnight Caller	Chandler	Episode: "Wait Until Midnight"
1991	Cry in the Wild: The Taking of Peggy Ann	Bicycle Pete	Television film
1992	The Hat Squad	Frankie Stein	Episode: "Frankie Stein"
1992	Tales from the Crypt	Tom McMurdo	Episode: "Showdown"
1992	Reasonable Doubts	Edward Durrell	Episode: "Moment of Doubt"
1992	Dead Ahead: The Exxon Valdez Disaster	Rick Steiner	Television film
1993	Miracle on Interstate 880	Dr. Jim Betts	Television film
1993	Big Wave Dave's	Dave Bell	6 episodes
1993	SeaQuest DSV	Lenny Sutter	Episode: "SeaWest"
1995	Homicide: Life on the Street	Jim Bayliss	Episode: "Colors"
1995	The Langoliers	Captain Brian Engle	Television film
1995	Tecumseh: The Last Warrior	Galloway	Television film
1997	Murder Live!	Frank McGrath	Television film
2001	American Experience	Abraham Lincoln	Voice; 6 episodes
2002–2004	Hack	Mike Olshansky	40 episodes Wrote episode: "Gone"
2006–2007	House	Det. Michael Tritter	6 episodes Nominated – Primetime Emmy Award for Outstanding Guest Actor in a Drama Series
2008	John Adams	George Washington	4 episodes Nominated – Primetime Emmy Award for Outstanding Supporting Actor in a Miniseries or a Movie; Nominated – Monte-Carlo Television Festival for Outstanding Actor in a Mini Series
2009	Medium	Douglas Lydecker	3 episodes
2009	Empire State	James Cochrane	Episode: "Pilot"
2010–2013	Treme	NOPD Lt. Terry Colson	31 episodes
2011	Lights Out	Jerry "The Rainmaker" Raines	Episode: "Rainmaker"
2012	Victory in Defeat	Douglas MacArthur	Japanese series
2012	Robot Chicken	Robin Hood; The Lorax	Voice; Episode: "Butchered in Burbank"
2014	Untitled Wall Street Project	Conklin	CBS pilot
2015	True Detective	Eliot Bezzerides	3 episodes
2016–2017	Outsiders	"Big Foster" Farrell VI	26 episodes
2017–2020	Blindspot	Hank Crawford	7 episodes
2018	Escape at Dannemora	Gene Palmer	6 episodes
2019	The Deuce	Matthew Rouse	2 episodes
2019	The Morning Show	Mr. Jackson	Episode: "No One's Gonna Harm You, Not While I'm Around"
2020	The Good Lord Bird	Dutch Henry Sherman	Episode: "Meet the Lord"
2021	The Chair	Dean Paul Larson	6 episodes
2023	The Last Thing He Told Me	Nicholas Bell	Miniseries
2025	We Were Liars	Harris Sinclair	8 episodes

=== Selected stage work ===
List of selected David Morse stage credits
Year	Title	Role	Notes
1981	The Trading Post	Jim	WPA Theatre
1981	Threads	Nub / Clyde	Circle Theatre
1990–1991	The Wild Duck		Los Angeles Theatre Center
1992	Redwood Curtain	Lyman	Bagley Wright Theatre – Seattle Repertory Theatre; World Premiere
1995	On the Waterfront	Father Barry	Brooks Atkinson Theatre
1997–1998	How I Learned to Drive	Uncle Peck	Century Center for the Performing Arts; World Premiere; Lucille Lortel Award for Outstanding Actor; Drama Desk Award for Outstanding Actor; Obie Award for Best Performance; Nominated – Outer Critics Circle Award for Outstanding Actor
2007–2008	The Seafarer	James "Sharky" Harkin	Booth Theatre
2013	The Unavoidable Disappearance of Tom Durnin	Tom Durnin	Laura Pels Theatre
2018	The Iceman Cometh	Larry Slade	Bernard B. Jacobs Theatre; Nominated – Tony Award for Best Featured Actor in a Play
2022	How I Learned to Drive	Uncle Peck	Samuel J. Friedman Theatre; Broadway Premiere; Nominated – Tony Award for Best Actor in a Play

=== Audiobook performances ===
List of David Morse audiobook credits
Year	Title	Author	Notes
1999	A Patchwork Planet	Anne Tyler	Abridged Version
2003	Messenger	Lois Lowry	
2014	Revival	Stephen King	
2015	The Andromeda Strain	Michael Crichton	
2016	Skeleton Crew	Stephen King	Partial Reading
2016	And Every Morning the Way Home Gets Longer and Longer	Fredrik Backman	English Translation
2018	Flight or Fright	Various	Partial Reading
2018	Leadership: In Turbulent Times	Doris Kearns Goodwin	Partial Reading
2020	The Second Life of Tiger Woods	Michael Bamberger	
2025	Theo of Golden	Allen Levi	
