= Iranian Korean =

Iranian Korean or Korean Iranian may refer to:

- Iran–North Korea relations
- Iran–South Korea relations
- Koreans in Iran
- Iranians in North Korea
- Iranians in South Korea

== See also ==
- Digging to America, a 2006 novel by American author Anne Tyler, which tells the story of an Iranian American couple and a so-called White Anglo-Saxon Protestant (WASP) couple, each of whom adopts a girl from Korea
