= Celestial navigation (disambiguation) =

Celestial navigation is the practice of position fixing that allows a navigator to move through space.

Celestial navigation may also refer to:

- Celestial Navigation (novel), a 1974 novel by Anne Tyler
- "Celestial Navigation", an episode from season 1 of The West Wing

== See also ==
- Celestial (disambiguation)
