= Me and My Arrow =

"Me And My Arrow"
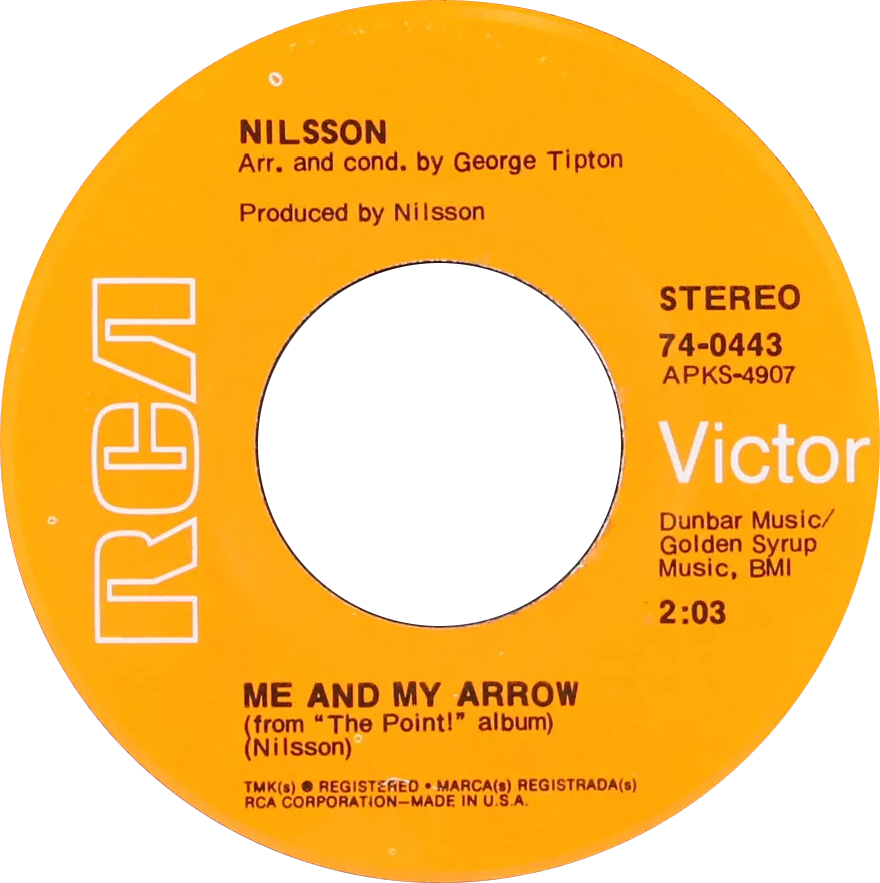
- Side A of the US single

Single by Harry Nilsson

from the album The Point!
- B-side: "Are You Sleeping?"
- Released: March 1971
- Genre: Pop
- Length: 2:03
- Label: RCA Victor
- Songwriter: Harry Nilsson
- Producer: Harry Nilsson

Harry Nilsson singles chronology
"I Guess the Lord Must Be in New York City" (1969)	"Me And My Arrow" (1971)	"Without You" (1972)

"Me and My Arrow" is a song written and recorded by American singer-songwriter Harry Nilsson for his 1970 album The Point! It was also released as a single in 1971, reaching number 34 on the US Billboard Hot 100 and number 3 on the Adult Contemporary chart.

The song was composed as the theme for The Point, an animated television show about Oblio, the pointless boy, and his dog Arrow.

== Chart history ==
Chart (1971)	Peak position
Australia (Kent Music Report)	52
Canada RPM Adult Contemporary	18
Canada RPM Top Singles	17
U.S. Billboard Hot 100	34
U.S. Billboard Adult Contemporary	3
U.S. Cash Box Top 100	27

== In popular culture ==
- Sampled in the "Blackalicious" song "Blazing Arrow" on their 2002 album by the same name.
- Featured in the season 24 episode "To Cur with Love" of The Simpsons as the theme for Homer Simpson and his dog Bongo.
- Used in a series of television commercials promoting the Plymouth Arrow compact car. According to the official Twitter account of the Harry Nilsson estate, the songwriter agreed to let Plymouth use the song in exchange for a new car of which Chrysler agreed. The corporation originally balked at Nilsson's request for a Mercedes-Benz instead of a Plymouth but eventually relented.
- Performed by Adrian Belew on the album For the Love of Harry: Everyone Sings Nilsson
