= Ladder of Years =

1995 novel by Anne Tyler

- First edition cover
- Author: Anne Tyler
- Language: English
- Genre: Novel
- Publisher: Knopf
- Publication date: 1995
- Publication place: United States
- Media type: Print (Hardback & Paperback)
- Pages: 325 pp
- ISBN: 0-679-44155-7
- OCLC: 246646445

Ladder of Years is a 1995 novel by Anne Tyler. It was a New York Times "Notable Book" and chosen by Time as one of ten best books of 1995.

== Plot summary ==
This is a novel about a woman, Delia Grinstead, who finds her own self-identity and battles with familial relationships. As a spontaneous act of deep sadness and anger, she walks out on her family during a beach vacation. Not only does she put herself in a dire financial situation, she also places herself in a psychologically damaging situation with her family and husband. The narrative follows her as she deals with entering the workforce and considering what is most important in her life. As she deals with these issues, she comes to terms with herself.

Cathleen Schine, in her 1995 review in The New York Times, analyzes Delia—and the dilemma Tyler has created for her—in this manner:

"If the reader is never quite sure why Delia deserts her life, neither is Delia herself. All she can say to explain herself when her family finally tracks her down is, 'I'm here because I just like the thought of beginning again from scratch.' [She] strips herself bare and exiles herself in the scrappy little town of Bay Borough, and it is she who tests the love of her family, she who waits for a declaration. The novel examines marriage—there are all sorts of marriages Delia comes across in her adventures, good and bad—as well as aging and independence, but finally it is a book about choice. All those years ago, Sam chose Delia, the youngest sister, the one on the right. But whom did Delia choose? Pulled yet repelled by her past, by her complicated and idiosyncratic family, and lured by a new town with a new complicated and idiosyncratic family, what will Delia choose now?"

== Title ==
Nat Moffat, Noah's grandfather, describes his retirement home, Senior City, to Delia: "We're organized on the vertical. Feebler we get, higher up we live. Floor below this one is hale-and-hearty....Fourth floor is total care. Nurses, beds with railings....Something about the whole setup strikes me as uncomfortably, shall we say, symbolic. See, I've always pictured life as one of those ladders you find on playground sliding boards-a sort of ladder of years where you climb higher and higher, and then, oops! you fall over the edge and others move up behind you."

== Reviews ==
- Cathleen Schine "New Life for Old", New York Times (May 7, 1995), writes, "The French have said that William Wyler, the great director of movies like Dodsworth and The Best Years of Our Lives, had a "style sans style." Anne Tyler has this same deceptive "style without a style." Opening one of her books in the middle and picking a page at random, a reader might not immediately recognize her individual rhythm or idiosyncratic temperament. She does nothing fancy, nothing tricky. But so rigorous and artful is the style without a style, so measured and delicate is each observation, so complex is the structure and so astute and open the language, that the reader can relax, feel secure in the narrative and experience the work as something real and natural—even inevitable."
- Kirkus Reviews writes, "All of Tyler's trademarks are here: comedy, the sweet, blunt edges of romance, and characters so perfectly, achingly drawn you can never decide whether they're the most oddball or most everyday people you've ever come across. Despite all this, Delia's story begins to feel slightly unfocused -- it pulls our sympathies every which way. There are allusions here to both King Lear and to fairy tales, but the ending to Delia's adventure is neither tragedy nor happily ever after, but something awkwardly in-between. Still, any journey with Tyler is always worth the ride -- and then some."

== See also ==
- Cathleen Schine
- William Wyler
- Kirkus Reviews
