= Tourist guy =

Hoax related to the September 11 attacks

The "tourist guy" standing on the roof of the World Trade Center, seemingly seconds before American Airlines Flight 11 hits the tower.

The "tourist guy" was an internet phenomenon that featured a photograph of a tourist on the observation deck of the World Trade Center (WTC) digitally altered to show American Airlines Flight 11 about to hit the tower in the background during the September 11 attacks. The photo went viral in the days after the attacks as many manipulated pictures spread online. The man in the photograph was later identified as Hungarian Péter Guzli, who took the photo in 1997. Guzli said he edited the photo as a joke for his friends and did not intend for it to spread across the internet.

He is also called numerous other names, including the "accidental tourist" (a reference to the novel and film The Accidental Tourist), "Waldo" (a reference to Where's Waldo?), the "WTC Guy", and the "tourist of death".

== Origin ==
Shortly after 9/11, the image surfaced on the internet, spreading via spam emails. The emails would claim that the picture was found inside of a camera retrieved from the World Trade Center wreckage, alleging that the Federal Bureau of Investigation (FBI) had developed the picture for evidence and had recently released it online.

=== Composition ===
The image showed a man, dressed in a beanie, heavy jacket, and backpack, standing on the observation deck of the World Trade Center. Below him, Flight 11 can be seen flying towards the building. Because of its closeness and low altitude, it seems certain to collide with the tower. The picture was purported to be one taken mere seconds before the attacks on the World Trade Center began.

== Inconsistencies ==
Hoaxapedia, the Museum of Hoaxes' online encyclopedia, lists some of the inconsistencies that ultimately confirmed that the photograph was a hoax. These include:

- The temperature in New York City was around 64 to 68 °F (18 to 20 °C) on the morning of the attacks, yet the man in the photo is wearing heavy clothing consistent with winter weather.
- The man would have been standing on the South Tower, which had an observation deck; yet the North Tower, without such a deck, was the first to be hit, thus refuting the claim that the photo was taken prior to the beginning of the attacks. It is unlikely that anyone would be posing for a photo after the North Tower was hit.
- Within seconds of the first impact, the South Tower’s rooftop was engulfed by smoke from the North Tower, which was directed southeast by prevailing winds from the northwest. Not only would this have prevented the man from standing on the observation deck for any length of time, but the forgery depicts the observation deck as being clear of smoke and debris.
- United Airlines Flight 175 crashed into the South Tower from the south. However, it is evident from the fact that Midtown Manhattan is in the background behind the man that the plane in this photo is approaching from the north, consistent with American Airlines Flight 11. The plane in the picture clearly displays the American Airlines livery on its nose.
- Both planes that were flown into the towers were Boeing 767s, whereas a Boeing 757 is shown in this photo.
- The plane likely would have been blurred in the photo due to its high speed before impact.
- Both planes crashed while banking to the left. Here the plane is seen flying perfectly level, with no banking.
- The photographer was not likely to proceed with taking the picture after seeing the airplane about to crash into the building.
- If the photo was taken on a digital camera, the camera would not have likely survived such a fall.
- The observation deck on the South Tower normally opened at 9:30 a.m. but Flight 175 struck the south tower at 9:02:59 a.m.
- The white balance of the two photographs is far off. If the plane were part of the photograph, it would appear more yellow. This can be confirmed by comparison with the deck rail at the bottom of the photograph; the plane had nearly the same tint as the deck, while in the photo the two parts show obviously different color.
- The image’s timestamp appears to have been added during post editing with a paint program, rather than one created by an actual camera.
- Shadows of certain items are not cast correctly in the photo. This proves that the image was edited, as certain objects in the image do not cast shadows corresponding to the same light sources in the picture.

== Later appearances ==
The picture became a widely known example of an internet meme. As its fame spread, internet users started to edit the same tourist into other pictures. Users edited him into photos of various disasters and events, such as the sinking of the RMS Titanic, at the John F. Kennedy assassination, the destruction of Air France Flight 4590, and at the Hindenburg disaster. In one version, the aircraft has been replaced with a Melbourne tram. Other edits showed him present at disastrous events in movies, like the destruction of the White House in Independence Day, Godzilla demolishing Tokyo, or as the bus driver in Speed. There are also pictures of him together with people from other famous digitally manipulated pictures, such as Bert from Sesame Street.

== Identity ==
The first person who claimed to be the tourist was the Brazilian businessman José Roberto Penteado. When Penteado started to get media attention, including an offer to be in a Volkswagen commercial, a 25-year-old Hungarian man, Péter Guzli, came forward as the real tourist. Guzli said, however, that he does not want publicity and did not originally disclose his surname.

Guzli took the photo on November 28, 1997, and was also responsible for the initial edit. He said he edited the image for a few friends, not realizing it would spread so quickly across the Internet. He first provided the original undoctored photo and several other photos from the same series as proof to a Hungarian newspaper. Later on, the show Wired News examined the evidence and confirmed that Guzli was the real tourist guy.
