= The Amateur Marriage =

2004 novel by Anne Tyler

- First edition
- Author: Anne Tyler
- Language: English
- Publisher: Alfred A. Knopf
- Publication date: 2004
- Publication place: United States
- Media type: Print (hardback & paperback)
- Pages: 320 pp (first edition, hardback)
- ISBN: 1-4000-4207-0
- OCLC: 52729037
- Dewey Decimal: 813/.54 22
- LC Class: PS3570.Y45 A59 2004

The Amateur Marriage, published in 2004, is American author Anne Tyler's sixteenth novel.

== Plot summary ==
The plot concerns the marriage of Michael Anton and Pauline Barclay, who meet when he tends to her bloodied brow in his family's grocery store, located in a primarily Eastern European enclave in Baltimore, in December 1941. They marry after Michael is discharged from the Army with a permanent injury caused by a deliberate shot from someone he assaulted.

Michael and Pauline settle in a small apartment above the store, but their widely different temperaments and expectations quickly create dissension in the relationship. He is repressed, controlling, and quiet; she is loud, emotional, and romantic. At Pauline's insistence, they move to the suburbs, where they raise three children: Lindy, George and Karen.

"Lindy, who has always been a stubborn, willful child, becomes increasingly defiant as a teenager, and one day, she just leaves home -- and doesn't return. Her disappearance -- like the abrupt, sometimes violent events that occur in many Tyler novels, propelling heretofore passive characters into a re-evaluation of their lives -- does not bring her parents closer together, but instead results in another round of accusations and recriminations." Lindy runs away to San Francisco in 1960 and becomes involved in the growing drug culture. Eight years later, her parents retrieve Pagan, Lindy's three-year-old son, while Lindy detoxes in a rehab community.

"The lives of the Antons, of course, are not just about fighting; Pauline and Michael are also tied to each other by their children, by shared adventures and, as the years pass, by bonds of memory and inertia. Caring for aging parents, witnessing the illnesses and travails of friends, adapting to a move to the suburbs -- these are all experiences that bind Pauline and Michael to each other, even as their very different temperaments and interests increasingly pull them apart." The slowly crumbling marriage finally dissolves when Michael leaves Pauline on their 30th anniversary. For Michael, convinced that he and Pauline didn't have the faintest idea what they were doing when they married or how to conduct a marriage (that they were "amateurs"), divorce is a salvation. For Pauline, it's a tragedy that leaves her in despair.

The last third of the novel pursues how Michael, Pauline, and their children deal with moving on with the rest of their lives after the divorce. Michael remarries and Pauline forms new friendships but struggles with loneliness and dealing with day-to-day demands of an older single woman living in a big old house.

== Reviews ==
Michiko Kakutani wrote in her New York Times review: "Though The Amateur Marriage can leave the longtime Tyler fan with the sense that the author is simply reconnoitering territory long ago annexed and mapped out, it is so psychologically detailed that the story as a whole stands as one of her more convincing efforts: an ode to the complexities of familial love, the centripetal and centrifugal forces that keep families together and send their members flying apart, the supremely ordinary pleasures and frustrations of middle-class American life."

William H. Pritchard: "The Amateur Marriage is...Tyler's most ambitious work, ranging over 60 years of American experience, from the attack on Pearl Harbor in 1941 to the anniversary of that day in 2001....An aspect of Tyler's slyness lies in her ability to write sentences that seem to present no resistance, that are perfectly clear in their direction, that don't send up metaphorical gestures by way of suggesting the inexpressibility of life. Yet such writing is beautifully accurate, more often than not with a glinting vein of humor. ...Tyler's grip on her characters and their pathos is similarly mischievous, but its focus is steady and unerring. The book also touches levels deeper than mischief...to spend the last third of the novel demonstrating (as one of the chapter titles has it) that The World Won't End. Tragedy ends after the big mistake has been made and paid for, but comedy goes on its way, devoted to showing how everyone is necessarily mistaken."
