= Searching for Caleb =

1975 novel by Anne Tyler

- First edition
- Author: Anne Tyler
- Language: English
- Publisher: Alfred A. Knopf
- Publication date: 1975
- Publication place: United States
- Media type: Print
- Pages: 309
- ISBN: 0394498488
- OCLC: 1602029
- Dewey Decimal: 813.54
- LC Class: PZ4.T979

Searching for Caleb is Anne Tyler's sixth novel. It was originally published by Alfred A. Knopf in 1975.

== Book Description ==
=== From The Boston Globe ===
The novel follows three members of the Peck family: Duncan, who is drawn to an itinerant lifestyle; his wife Justine, a fortune teller with no memory of her past; and her grandfather Daniel, who has spent decades searching for a brother who disappeared in 1912. The narratives converge around the family's shared history and the tensions between rebellion and belonging....

=== From the back of the April 1983 Berkley paperback edition ===
The back of this edition reads: "Here is the heartbreaking and hilarious story of the Peck family - and a young woman's search for freedom, which leads her to the family's deepest roots. From the ragtime era at the end of the 19th century to the years of change in the mid-1970s, it is about growing up and breaking away, rebellion and acceptance. It is a haunting, human story that will live in your heart forever..."

=== From a 1976 review by Katha Pollitt in the New York Times ===
"When Duncan marries his cousin Justine, hitherto an ardent Peck, she begins to discover her own thirst for adventure. For years the two careen through the small towns of Maryland and Virginia as Duncan quits one makeshift job for another…. Justine is pulled both forward and back: an amateur teller of fortunes who advises her clients always to go along with change, she remains in thrall to her own childhood. And so, when Daniel decides to find his lost brother, Justine is the one who joins him. For the old man the quest is a way of recapturing the past, but for Justine it becomes a search for the self she has mislaid. The outcome is marvelously ironic, since the answers to her questions are themselves enigmatic. Yet she emerges triumphant, her own woman at last."

== Reviews ==
In his 1976 review in The New Yorker, John Updike wrote, “Funny and lyric and true, exquisite in its details and ambitious in its design…This writer is not merely good, she is wickedly good.”

Katha Pollitt praised: "Less perfectly realized than Celestial Navigation, her extraordinarily moving and beautiful last novel,Searching for Caleb is Tyler’s sunniest, most expansive book. While etching with a fine, sharp wit the narrow-mindedness and pettishness of the Pecks, she lavishes on them a tenderness that lifts them above satire….Reading “Searching for Caleb,” one is constantly being startled by...gestures, words, wrinkles of thought and feeling that are at once revelatory and exactly right. But at the center of Tyler’s characters is a private, mysterious core which is left, wisely, inviolate. Ultimately this wisdom is what makes Tyler more than a fine craftsman of realistic novels. Her complex, crotchety inventions surprise us, but one senses they surprise her too."
