= I Hate My Job =

- Genre: Reality television
- Written by: Andrea Levin
- Directed by: Susan Peters; Esquire Jauchem
- Presented by: Al Sharpton
- Country of origin: United States
- Original language: English
- No. of seasons: 1
- No. of episodes: 7

Production
- Production company: RDF Media

Original release
- Network: Spike TV
- Release: November 9, 2004 – January 5, 2005

I Hate My Job is an American reality television series about young men abandoning their careers for the chance to pursue unfulfilled dreams. The show was hosted by Al Sharpton. It was shown on Spike TV from 2004 to 2005.
