= Taqi Modarresi =

Iranian writer and child psychiatrist

Taqi Modarressi (1932–1997) was an Iranian writer and child psychiatrist. He was born in Tehran, the son of a lawyer, and grew up in a highly cultured family. He was related to a noted progressive cleric Mirza Sayyed Mohammad Tabatabai through his mother's side.

== Biography ==
He trained as a doctor at Tehran University, but after being harassed by the security forces of the Shah, he migrated to the USA in 1959. He worked in Wichita, Kansas, then took up a residency at Duke University. After he married the writer Anne Tyler in 1963, they moved to Montreal, where he took up a residency at McGill University.

He joined the faculty at the University of Maryland medical school in 1967, specializing in child development. In 1982, he founded the pioneering research center, Center for Infant Study.

He had two daughters with Anne Tyler, the artist Tezh Modarressi and the writer Mitra Modarressi.

He died of lymphoma in 1997.

=== Writing career ===
Taqi started to write when still in high school. He published a collection of short stories, Dāʾemolḵamr (Perpetually Drunk, 1948). His first novel was Yakolyā and Her Loneliness appeared in the 1950s, and won a literary prize from Soḵan Magazine.

After moving to the US, his literary output dwindled. The only major work for many years was the novel Šarif jān, šarif jān (1961). Two novels came out in the 1980s, Ketāb-e ādamhā-ye ḡāyeb (The book of Absent People, New York, 1986), and Ādāb-e ziārat (The Pilgrim’s Rules of Etiquette, New York, 1989)

The novels of Modarresi have also been translated and published in other countries. The Danish, German, and French translations of The Book of Absent People are available. French translations of The Pilgrim's Rules of Etiquette are also available.

His final novel, Azrā-ye ḵalwat nešin (The Virgin of Solitude), was unpublished at the time of his death.

== External references ==
- Contributors: Taqi Modarresi. The New York Review of Books
