= If Morning Ever Comes =

1964 novel by Anne Tyler

- First edition
- Author: Anne Tyler
- Language: English
- Publisher: Knopf
- Publication date: 1964
- Publication place: United States
- Media type: Print (Hardcover and Paperback)
- Pages: 265 pp

If Morning Ever Comes (1964) is American author Anne Tyler's first novel, published when she was only 22.

Set in Sandhill, North Carolina, it focuses on Ben Joe Hawkes, a self-proclaimed worrier who finds himself responsible for taking care of his mother and six sisters after his father deserts the family for his mistress and subsequently dies of a heart attack.

At its start, Ben Joe has left Sandhill to pursue a law degree at Columbia University; however, he soon learns that his eldest sister, Joanne, has left her husband and returned home with her baby girl. Out of a mixture of homesickness and a sense of responsibility, he returns home to assume his role as head of the family. Eventually, he realizes that his family may not need him as much as he needs his independence. Joanne and her husband are reconciled, and Ben Joe renews friendly relations with his late father's mistress. He proposes to his ex-girlfriend, Shelley, and the two return to New York to be married.
