= Charles Okun =

American assistant director, producer and production manager

- Born: September 8, 1924; New York, U.S.
- Died: July 3, 2005 (aged 80); Florida, U.S.
- Occupations: Assistant director, producer, production manager
- Children: 2

Charles Okun (September 8, 1924 - July 3, 2005) was an American assistant director, producer and production manager. He was nominated for an Academy Award in the category Best Picture for the film The Accidental Tourist.

Okun died in July 2005 from complications of cancer in Florida, at the age of 80.

== Selected filmography ==
- The Accidental Tourist (1988; co-nominated with Lawrence Kasdan and Michael Grillo)
