= Clock Dance =

2018 novel by Anne Tyler

First edition

Clock Dance (2018, Alfred A. Knopf) is the 22nd novel published by American author Anne Tyler.

== Plot summary ==
Eleven year old Willa Drake struggles to keep things together in the face of her mother's dramatic and disruptive behavior. As a young woman, she seeks stability in an early marriage, leaving college to build a steady and predictable environment for herself and her family. She must rebuild that life two decades later, after her husband's death. After another 20 years, at 61, Willa leads a comfortable, stylish life in Arizona with her semi-retired second husband, Peter. While she gets along fine in this environment, she finds it all confining and empty. Then one day, a stranger phones from Baltimore, seeking help for a young mother who has been seriously injured; the connection turns out to be that the woman is a former girlfriend of one of Willa's sons, the caller mistakenly assuming Willa is family. With few other commitments, Willa is drawn to fly east, husband in tow; they find Denise, her nine-year-old daughter Cheryl and a dog, Airplane, living in a small house in a rundown but lively Baltimore neighborhood. While she brings stability and support to Denise and Cheryl, Willa also reclaims her younger, freer and less deferential self.
