= Saint Maybe =

1991 novel by Anne Tyler

- First edition
- Author: Anne Tyler
- Language: English
- Publisher: Knopf
- Publication date: 1991
- Publication place: United States
- Media type: Print (Hardback & Paperback)
- Pages: 337 pp
- ISBN: 0-679-40361-2
- OCLC: 23691414
- Dewey Decimal: 813/.54 20
- LC Class: PS3570.Y45 S25 1991

Saint Maybe is a 1991 novel by American author Anne Tyler.

== Plot ==
Tyler's plot explores the ways ordinary people react to disastrous events with quietly heroic behavior. When seventeen-year-old Ian Bedloe confronts his older brother Danny with his belief that the latter's wife, Lucy, is having an affair, Danny drives into a wall in an apparent suicide. Shortly after, Lucy dies of an overdose of sleeping pills, and responsibility for the care of the deceased couple's three children (two from their mother's previous marriage) falls to their grandparents. A profoundly guilty Ian, who has discovered his accusations were wrong, receives spiritual guidance from Reverend Emmett of the storefront Church of the Second Chance, and he decides to drop out of college to become a carpenter and help his ailing parents with the children, until he eventually becomes their primary caretaker, sacrificing his own freedom to fulfill what he perceives to be a lifelong moral obligation.

As the years pass and the three children mature, Ian continues to be torn between his sense of obligation to the children and the urge to have a "real life," but he increasingly finds solace and peace in participation at the church and becomes devoted to it, its homespun followers, and Rev. Emmett. Ian also develops into a dependable and loving father. The two oldest children (Agatha and Thomas) eventually leave home and form their own families, while the youngest (Daphne) stays home with Ian and the grandparents. When the grandmother has a heart attack, Agatha returns to find a disorganized house and tries to restore order. Efforts to organize the house with help from Daphne's friend, a young female professional "Clutter Counselor"(Rita), ultimately provide Ian with an opportunity for a new beginning as he and Rita become engaged to be married. "Moving back and forth among the points of view of various characters, Ms. Tyler traces two decades in the lives of the Bedloes, showing us the large and small events that shape family members' lives and the almost imperceptible ways in which feelings of familial love and obligation mutate over the years."

== Reviews ==
Michiko Kakutani of the New York Times writes, "Fans of Ms. Tyler's work...will soon recognize the conflict [Ian] feels between self-sacrifice and independence as a manifestation of one of her favorite themes, namely the tension in American life between community and freedom, familial responsibility and autonomous self-definition. Indeed, this is a dialectic that every member of the Bedloe family must come to terms with by the end of the novel....Each character in "Saint Maybe" has been fully rendered, fleshed out with a palpable interior life, and each has been fit, like a hand-sawed jigsaw-puzzle piece, into the matrix of family life. The result is a warm and generous novel, a novel that attests once again to Ms. Tyler's enormous gifts as a writer and her innate understanding of the mysteries of kinship and blood."

Poet and novelist Jay Parini writes, "I adored Saint Maybe. In many ways it is Anne Tyler's most sophisticated work, a realistic chronicle that celebrates family life without erasing the pain and boredom that families almost necessarily inflict upon their members. Ian Bedloe, for his part, sits near the top of Ms. Tyler's fine list of heroes. Exactly how she makes us care so much about him remains a mystery to me. That is, perhaps, the mystery of art."

In her review in the Christian Science Monitor, Marilyn Gardner summarizes, "In Saint Maybe, as in her other novels, Tyler dramatizes a debate about the pros and cons of family life. Is the family an anchor in the storm? Or is it a shackle? Do duty and devotion hold together the members who make up a family as well as the family itself? Or do families become, not support systems, but burdens of guilt, leading to damaging sacrifices of personal freedom?...As she explores the myriad ways in which dreams get deferred and hopes revised, infusing the prosaic details of domestic life with honor, humor, and deep affection, it is Anne Tyler's achievement to raise ordinariness to an art form."

Bruce Bawer in The New Criterion included the novel in a group of works that "soar above the shallow level at which most American literary fiction operates nowadays."

== In other media ==
In 1998, the novel was adapted for a Hallmark Hall of Fame television film, starring Thomas McCarthy as Ian, Mary-Louise Parker as Lucy, Blythe Danner as Bee, Edward Herrmann as Doug, Melina Kanakaredes as Rita, Glynnis O'Connor as Claudia, Denis O'Hare as Reverend Emmett, and Jeffrey Nordling as Danny.

The novel is also mentioned as a positive inspiration in Bishop Mariann Edgar Budde’s memoir How We Learn to Be Brave.
