= Diary of a City Priest =

- Directed by: Eugene Martin
- Screenplay by: Eugene Martin
- Based on: Diary of a City Priest by John McNamee
- Produced by: Eugene Martin; Ed Givnish; Lisa Rosenstein; Kate Wilson
- Starring: David Morse
- Cinematography: Michael Pearlman
- Edited by: Eugene Martin; Juli Vizza
- Music by: Matthew Levy
- Production company: City Story Pictures
- Distributed by: ITVS
- Release date: 2000 (Hamptons)
- Running time: 78 minutes
- Country: United States
- Language: English

Diary of a City Priest is a 2000 American drama film written and directed by Eugene Martin and starring David Morse. It is based on the book of the same name by John McNamee.

== Cast ==
- David Morse as Father John McNamee
- John Ryan as Father Dave Hagan
- Philip Goodwin as St. Francis of Assisi
- Ana Reeder as St. Therese
- Robert Sella as St. Malachy
- Judy Bauerlin as Sister Mary
- Marylouise Burke as Sister Grace
