= Breathing Lessons =

1988 novel by Anne Tyler

- First edition cover
- Author: Anne Tyler
- Language: English
- Publisher: Knopf
- Publication date: 1988
- Publication place: United States
- Media type: Print (hardback & paperback)
- Pages: 336
- ISBN: 0-394-57234-3
- OCLC: 17917014
- Dewey Decimal: 813/.54 19
- LC Class: PS3570.Y45 B74 1988

Breathing Lessons is a Pulitzer Prize–winning 1988 novel by American author Anne Tyler. It is her eleventh novel and won the 1989 Pulitzer Prize for Fiction.

== Plot ==
The story describes the joys and pains of the ordinary marriage of Ira and Maggie Moran as they travel from Baltimore to attend a funeral and back home again in one day. It also examines Maggie's attempts to reconcile her son and daughter-in-law. During the journey to the funeral, we learn how both Ira and Maggie have forgone their youthful dreams and feel they have settled for an "ordinary life." We experience how they exasperate each other—Maggie too talkative, too meddling; Ira too logical, uncommunicative, and too judgmental. A few detours during their 90-mile drive reveal Ira and Maggie's "incompatibilities, disappointments, unmet expectations—and lasting love".

== Adaptations ==
In 1994, a television movie based on the book was made for the Hallmark Hall of Fame. It was directed by John Erman, and starred James Garner and Joanne Woodward as Ira and Maggie Moran. Both were nominated for Emmy Awards during the 46th Primetime Emmy Awards for Outstanding Lead Actor in a Miniseries or Special and Outstanding Lead Actress in a Miniseries or Special. Joanne Woodward won a Golden Globe Award and a Screen Actors Guild Award for her performance. Additional nominations were given for Outstanding Television Movie and Outstanding Individual achievement in Writing in a Miniseries or a Special. It was filmed in the Pittsburgh PA area.

Kevin McKeon also adapted the novel into a stage play. From June 6 – 29, 2003, he directed its premier run at the Book-It Repertory Theatre, at Seattle Center House Theatre, Seattle Center, in Seattle, Washington.

== Awards ==
Breathing Lessons won the Pulitzer Prize for Fiction in 1989 and was a finalist for the 1988 National Book Award. It was also Time's Book of the Year.
