= Dinner at the Homesick Restaurant =

1982 novel by Anne Tyler

- First edition cover
- Author: Anne Tyler
- Illustrator: Fred Marcellino
- Language: English
- Publisher: Knopf
- Publication date: March 12, 1982
- Publication place: United States
- Media type: Print (hardback & paperback)
- Pages: 303 pp
- ISBN: 0-394-52381-4
- OCLC: 7732718
- Dewey Decimal: 813/.54 19
- LC Class: PS3570.Y45 D5 1982

Dinner at the Homesick Restaurant is a 1982 novel by Anne Tyler, set in Baltimore, Maryland. It is Tyler's ninth novel. In 1983 it was a finalist for the Pulitzer Prize, the National Book Award, and the PEN/Faulkner Award. Tyler considers it her best work.

The book follows the lives of three siblings: Cody, Ezra, and Jenny, and explores their experiences and recollections of growing up with their mother, Pearl, after the family is deserted by their father, Beck. The novel ends with Pearl's funeral, and a surprise occurrence.

The novel examines how siblings may share the same events yet experience them differently. For example, Cody remembers his childhood as a harsh time. He blames himself for his father abandoning him, and considers himself left to the mercy of an angry mother who favors Ezra. Meanwhile, Ezra remembers his childhood fondly, and founds a nostalgic family-themed restaurant.

== Plot ==
Pearl Tull is a rigid perfectionist. She has three children with her husband, traveling salesman Beck, who abandons the family. After Beck leaves, Pearl struggles to maintain a front as if nothing is wrong at all. Cody, the oldest, is wild and adventurous, but is envious of his brother Ezra, who he believes is Pearl's favorite. As they grow up, this plays out in endless pranks. Ezra is passive, and never tries to get back at Cody. He is nurturing and sweet, traits that often interest Cody's girlfriends, furthering Cody's resentment. Ezra goes to work at a restaurant, which he later manages and ultimately inherits, while Cody becomes a wealthy and successful efficiency expert. When Ezra becomes engaged to Ruth, his star cook, Cody becomes obsessed with luring her away, and ultimately succeeds, but his marriage to Ruth is not easy. Ezra never recovers, and remains at home with Pearl; he is a caregiver, both for Pearl and his customers, but this is underpinned by sadness.

Jenny is the third child and the most scholarly of the Tulls, but in college, she marries on an impulse with unhappy results. Only in her third marriage to a man with six children whose wife has abandoned him does she find stability in family life and in her successful, if harried, career as a pediatrician.

A recurring scene in the novel involves Ezra's unsuccessful attempts to bring the family together for a meal at his "Homesick Restaurant", reflecting his desire to unite and mend the family. At Pearl's funeral, Beck returns to the family for the first time. However, they never seem to be able to get through a single dinner without conflict, this time with Cody facing down his father, causing Beck to leave in the middle of the dinner. Ultimately, the entire family searches the town to find Beck, eventually bringing him back to the restaurant to finish their meal together.

== Reviews ==
Benjamin DeMott, wrote in his 1982 New York Times book review: "Dinner at the Homesick Restaurant is a book to be settled into fully....Funny, heart-hammering, wise, it edges deep into truth that's simultaneously (and interdependently) psychological, moral and formal - deeper than many living novelists of serious reputation have penetrated, deeper than Miss Tyler herself has gone before. It is a border crossing....

"On its face Dinner at the Homesick Restaurant is a book about the costs of parental truancy. None of the three Tull children manages to cut loose from the family past; each is, to a degree, stunted; each turns for help to Pearl Tull in an hour of desperate adult need; and Pearl's conviction that something's wrong with each of them never recedes from the reader's consciousness. But no small measure of the book's subtlety derives from its exceptional - and exceptionally wise, the word bears repeating - clarity about the uselessness of cost accounting in human areas such as these....The behavior and feelings of all three are linked somehow with the terrible, never-explained rupture: their father's disappearance....But it's also the case that what is best in each of these people, as in their mother, has its roots in the experience of deprivation that they jointly despise...We arrive at an understanding that the important lessons taught by adversity never quite make themselves known to the consciousness of the learners - remain hidden, inexpressible."

"What one wants to do on finishing such a work as Dinner at the Homesick Restaurant is maintain balance, keep things intact for a stretch, stay under the spell as long as feasible....We're speaking, obviously, about an extremely beautiful book."

John Updike, in his 1982 review in The New Yorker, wrote, “[Anne Tyler's] art needed only the darkening that would give her beautifully shaped sketches solidity....In her ninth novel, she has arrived at a new level of power.”

Margaret Manning of The Boston Globe thought that Dinner at the Homesick Restaurant is "a book that should join those few that every literate person should read....You surface from this marvelous novel as if from the bends, lungs nearly bursting, tears rattling on the page."
