= Digging to America =

2006 novel by Anne Tyler

- First edition
- Author: Anne Tyler
- Language: English
- Publisher: Knopf
- Publication date: May 2, 2006
- Publication place: United States
- Media type: Print (hardback & paperback)
- Pages: 323 pp
- ISBN: 0-307-26394-0
- OCLC: 61520455

Digging to America, published by Knopf in May 2006, is American author Anne Tyler's seventeenth novel.

== Plot ==
Digging to America is a story set in Baltimore, Maryland about two very different families’ experiences with adoption and their relationships with each other. Sami and Ziba Yazdan, an Iranian-American couple, and Brad and Bitsy Dickinson-Donaldson, an all-American suburban couple, meet at the airport on the day their adopted infant daughters arrive from Korea.

The differences between the two families are apparent from the beginning, especially in the way each couple decides to raise their daughters. Brad and Bitsy try not to Americanize their daughter, Jin-Ho; they keep her Korean name and teach her about Korean culture as she grows up. Sami and Ziba, on the other hand, choose to raise their daughter Susan as an American.

Through the efforts of Bitsy, the two families begin a tradition of celebrating their daughters’ arrival in America with an Arrival Party each year. The celebration becomes a mix of American, Korean, and Iranian culture. The story continues to progress through the early childhood of Jin-Ho and Susan, displaying the differences in how they are raised and the impact it has on them as they grow older. At times, the relationship between the two families is strained because of their contrasting opinions, but they remain good friends throughout the entire story.

As the lives of the two families continue to become closer, a new and separate relationship starts to flourish between Bitsy's widowed father, Dave, and Sami's widowed mother, Maryam.

== Characters ==
Jin-Ho Dickinson-Donaldson – the daughter of Brad and Bitsy, adopted from Korea at six months of age. Jin Ho is a complex character who maintains a dynamic personality throughout the book.

Susan Yazdan – the daughter of Sami and Ziba, adopted from Korea at six months of age. Susan may be seen as “bossy” to Jin Ho, but she is clearly the apple of her parents’ eye.

Bitsy Donaldson – the mother of Jin-Ho and Xiu-Mei, wife of Brad, and daughter of Connie and Dave.

Ziba Yazdan – the mother of Susan and wife of Sami. Ziba immigrated to the United States from Iran in high school and works as an interior designer. Ziba is very self-aware, always concerned about others and about her self-image.

Brad Donaldson – the father of Jin-Ho and Xiu-Mei, husband of Bitsy, and son of Pat and Lou. Brad is a loving husband who seems to believe Bitsy can do no wrong.

Sami Yazdan – the father of Susan, husband of Ziba, and son of Maryam. Sami was born in the United States. He is a quiet but opinionated man who really has a heart for his family.

Maryam – The mother of Sami and grandmother of Susan. Maryam is still very in touch with the Iranian culture. Her quiet confidence is sometimes portrayed as snotty. Maryam and Dave's “love” relationship is one of the most complex relationships in the novel.

Dave – the father of Bitsy, grandfather of Jin-Ho and Xiu-Mei, and husband of the late Connie. He is a warm-hearted and jolly man who falls in love with Maryam.

Lou – the father of Brad and husband of Pat.

Pat – the mother of Brad and wife of Lou.

Xiu-Mei – the younger daughter of Bitsy and Brad, adopted from China. She worries her parents sick with her pacifier addiction. Her stubborn ways prove to be a challenge for Brad and Bitsy.

Farah – the cousin of Maryam who lives in Vermont with her husband. She keeps in touch with her Iranian relatives, but manages to live an extravagant and exciting life that Maryam throws herself into once a year.

== Themes ==
Belonging

Michiko Kakutani in her New York Times book review: "In Ms. Tyler's new novel, Digging to America, belonging is a question not only of family but of being an American too: whether an immigrant can ever feel completely at home in the States, or whether he or she will always feel like an outsider; whether identity is a matter of will and choice or inherited culture and history...Ms. Tyler...delineates Maryam's efforts to come to terms with her new life in America with sympathy and wit, carefully tracking Maryam's ambivalent feelings toward Americans: the indignation she feels when condescending strangers praise her for having "an excellent vocabulary"; her impatience with trendy, multicultural liberals who willfully try to adopt foreigners' foods and traditions; and her anger at her son Sami when he mocks Americans for being self-absorbed, self-righteous and so instantaneously chummy."

Both the Donaldsons and the Yazdans adopt daughters from Korea; however, they take very different approaches to raising them. The Yazdans do more to make Susan feel like she is American than the Donaldsons do for Jin-Ho. The Yazdans change Sooki’s name to Susan, allow her to wear jeans, and style her hair in an American way. The Donaldsons keep Jin-Ho’s name the same, often dress her in Korean clothes and keep her hair the same as when she first arrived in America. Maryam struggles with the feeling that she doesn’t belong in America even though she’s been there for many years. She moved to America as a teenager and is now a U.S. citizen, but she is reluctant to call herself an American. She has distanced herself from the fast-paced American lifestyle. She does not own an answering machine or a cell phone. She says she danced the usual “Immigration Tango”, she was happy to become a U.S. citizen but sad to no longer be an Iranian citizen.

Parenting

Another theme in this novel is parenting. Bitsy and Ziba have very different parenting techniques, which often creates tension between them. Kakutani again: "Bitsy is... big-hearted but bossy, well-meaning but self-righteous,[and] insists on getting Jin-Ho a traditional Korean outfit, preaches the virtues of cloth diapers and the dangers of soft drinks, and burbles on about Maryam's Iranian recipes while criticizing the Yazdans' child-rearing decisions." Bitsy and Brad choose to maintain much about what makes Jin-Ho Korean, and, while Sami and Ziba do not forget this piece of who Susan is, they do not focus on it as much. Bitsy does not agree with Ziba's decision to work a few days a week, leaving Susan with Maryam. When Ziba announces that Susan is attending preschool, Bitsy says that Susan is too young. While at first Ziba appreciates these critiques and finds everything Bitsy knows about parenting impressive, she soon tires of it. When Brad and Bitsy adopt their second child Xiu-Mei, Bitsy's strict parenting style diminishes and she is no longer as critical of the way Ziba raises Susan.

Public/Private Boundaries

Another theme in the novel is the boundary between what parts of family life are shared and what parts should be kept private. The Yazdans keep more of their family life private than the Donaldsons do. From the very beginning of the book, the differences are clear. The Yazdans have a very small group of people to greet the baby at the airport, while the Donaldsons invite all of their extended family. Some things that most families would do in the privacy of their homes become a public affair for the Donaldons. Toilet training Jin-Ho, for example, is something most would keep private, but Bitsy actually throws a party to celebrate the event. When Dave proposes to Maryam, he does so in front of both of their families. He feels this is appropriate, but Maryam is horrified by the public proposal.

== Personal perspective ==
In Digging to America, Tyler has perhaps relied more on her personal life than in any other of her novels. Ms. Tyler was married for more than three decades to the Iranian-born child psychiatrist Taghi Modarressi who died of lymphoma in 1997. Tyler herself expounds that "for 44 years, his very large and complicated family has been giving me a close look at what it means to be foreign — to view America from the outside, to attempt to 'dig' one's way inside."

During the novel we learn that Maryam, during the Shah's reign, was a politically active student at the University of Tehran. After she was arrested for distributing leaflets on campus, her relatives worried that her behavior was endangering the family. It was decided that she should get married and move abroad. It is noteworthy that Tyler's husband, Taghi Modaressi, also left Iran in the late 1950s to escape persecution by the Shah's secret police. The friction in the novel between Maryam and her daughter-in-law's parents in a large part devolves from their strong positive feelings toward the Shah.

Finally, both Maryam and Dave are adjusting to lives without their spouses, who both died of cancer. They share their memories of how difficult living with their spouses in the final years were. One cannot help but recall that Tyler's own husband died of cancer just 9 years before this novel was released.

== Awards ==
New York Times Bestseller, A New York Times Notable Book, 2008 All-Iowa Reads selection

== Reception ==
In a mixed review, Tine Jordan of Entertainment Weekly wrote "for all of Tyler's writerly gifts — and she has many — it's hard to enjoy Digging to America: the characters are just that unlikeable."

The Daily Telegraph praised the book, calling it "...a comedy that is not so much brilliant as luminous – its observant sharpness sweetened by a generous understanding of human fallibility. So sure is her tone, so graceful her style, that the reader absorbs without literary indigestion a narrative constructed almost entirely of grand set-pieces of domestic comedy."

Ron Charles of The Washington Post wrote "With her 17th novel, Tyler has delivered something startlingly fresh while retaining everything we love about her work."

Michiko Kakutani wrote in her New York Times book review column, Digging to America "is arguably her most ambitious novel yet: a novel that not only provides an intimate portrait of a Baltimore family (or, in this case, two Baltimore families), as almost all of her books do, but also unfolds gently to look at what it means to be an American."

Liesl Schillinger, in her New York Times review, notes how much Tyler has shifted her focus with this novel: "There can hardly be a more American 20th-century writer than Anne Tyler. Anyone who has grown up with her books...has by now become familiar with her unflashy mastery of the national idiom, her dour whimsy, her tapestries of suffocating families and the rogue siblings and spouses who try, and usually fail, to become unknitted from their tight weave....But in "Digging to America," Tyler's characters face the future, not the past, so she doesn't let the freight of personal history freeze their forward motion, although it sometimes slows them down....Tyler has begun to shift her focus as she wrestles with the question of how an individual moves forward. With the map she's sketching, she's no longer in search of buried treasure; she's in search of the road ahead."
