= The Point! =

Studio album and soundtrack by Nilsson
- Released: December 1970
- Recorded: 1970
- Genre: Pop rock
- Length: 32:01
- Label: RCA Victor
- Producer: Harry Nilsson

Nilsson chronology
Nilsson Sings Newman (1970)	The Point! (1970)	Aerial Pandemonium Ballet (1971)

Singles from The Point!
- 1. "Me and My Arrow" / "Are You Sleeping?" Released: February 27, 1971

Professional ratings
Review scores
Source	Rating
AllMusic	4/5 stars
The Essential Rock Discography	7/10
MusicHound	3/5

The Point! is the sixth studio album by American songwriter and musician Harry Nilsson, released in late 1970. It was accompanied by an animated film adaptation directed by Fred Wolf, which aired in early February 1971 on the ABC-TV network. Its lead single, "Me and My Arrow", peaked at number 34 on the Billboard Hot 100.

The Point! is a fable that tells the story of a boy named Oblio, the only round-headed person in the Pointed Village, where by law everyone and everything must have a point. Nilsson explained his inspiration for The Point!:

I was on acid and I looked at the trees and I realized that they all came to points, and the little branches came to points, and the houses [each] came to [a] point. I thought, 'Oh! Everything has a point, and if it doesn't, then there's [still] a point to it.'

== Story ==
The round-headed Oblio has had to wear a pointed hat since birth to conceal his "pointless" condition from his pointy-headed peers. However, Oblio is accepted in the town despite his nonconformity, until one day, when the son of a fanatic evil count is unwittingly dishonored by Oblio. The count's son challenges Oblio to a one-on-one game of Triangle Toss, where participants catch triangles on their heads. Oblio wins with the help of his dog Arrow. In a fit of rage, the count, who wants his son to rule the land one day, confronts the good-hearted but timid king to reaffirm the law of the land, which states that those who are pointless must be banished from the kingdom and into the Pointless Forest. A jury reluctantly convicts both Oblio and Arrow, leaving the king with no choice but to send the pair away.

Oblio and Arrow are sent to the Pointless Forest, but soon discover that even the Pointless Forest has a point. They meet curious creatures like giant bees, a "pointed man" pointing in all directions who proclaims "A point in every direction is the same as no point at all!", a man made of rocks, three dancing fat sisters, and a walking, talking tree who helps Oblio see that everyone has a point, although it might not be readily displayed.

Oblio and Arrow spend the night in the Pointless Forest, then awaken to a large stone hand with the finger pointing to their "destination point". They take the road indicated by the hand and make their way back to the Land of Point, where they receive a hero's welcome from the land's citizens, except for the furious count. Oblio tells the people of the land that everything has a point, including the Pointless Forest, and himself. While the Count tries to dismiss it as nonsense, the king hangs on every word.

Upon this revelation the points of everyone else in the land disappear and the pointed buildings become round. Angered and disgraced, the count spitefully pulls off Oblio's pointed hat, but is taken aback when he sees a point on top of Oblio's bare head.

== Album ==
The Point! album, unlike the later film, features Nilsson himself telling the story directly to the listener, providing all the characters' voices as well as the narration.

A small comic book was included with the vinyl record when it was first released. The comic was illustrated by Gary Lund, who was also the production designer of the animated film.

On November 19, 2002, BMG Heritage released a Deluxe CD of the album with demos and a bonus track.

=== Track listing ===
All tracks are written by Harry Nilsson.

Side one
No.	Title	Length
1.	"Everything's Got 'Em"	2:25
2.	"The Town" (Narration)	1:31
3.	"Me and My Arrow"	2:04
4.	"The Game" (Narration)	1:49
5.	"Poli High"	2:41
6.	"The Trial and Banishment" (Narration)	2:11
7.	"Think About Your Troubles"	2:49

Side two
No.	Title	Length
8.	"The Pointed Man" (Narration)	2:42
9.	"Life Line"	2:21
10.	"The Birds" (Narration)	1:58
11.	"P.O.V. Waltz"	2:12
12.	"The Clearing in the Woods" (Narration)	1:53
13.	"Are You Sleeping?"	2:17
14.	"Oblio's Return" (Narration)	3:08

Deluxe 2002 CD bonus tracks
No.	Title	Length
15.	"Think About Your Troubles (demo)"
16.	"Life Line (demo)"
17.	"Down to the Valley"

== Charts ==
Chart (1971)	Peak position
Australia (Kent Music Report)	56

== Animated television film ==
The Point!
- Screenplay by: Norm Lenzer
- Story by: Harry Nilsson; Carole Beers
- Directed by: Fred Wolf
- Starring: Paul Frees; Lennie Weinrib; William E. Martin; Buddy Foster; Joan Gerber; Mike Lookinland
- Narrated by: Dustin Hoffman (1st telecast); Ringo Starr (home video release); Alan Barzman (2nd telecast); Alan Thicke (3rd telecast)
- Theme music composer: Harry Nilsson
- Country of origin: United States
- Original language: English

Production
- Producers: Jerry D. Good; Larry Gordon; Harry Nilsson; Fred Wolf; Jimmy T. Murakami (uncredited)
- Editor: Rich Harrison
- Running time: 74 minutes
- Production company: Murakami-Wolf Productions

Original release
- Network: ABC
- Release: February 2, 1971

=== Production ===
The Point, an animated adaptation of the story, first aired on February 2, 1971. It was the first animated feature ever to air in prime time on US television, appearing on the ABC television network as an ABC Movie of the Week.

The film was directed by Fred Wolf and produced by Murakami-Wolf Films in association with Nilsson House Music. This version uses a framing device of a father telling his son the fable as a bedtime story. In its initial airing, the voice of the father was provided by Dustin Hoffman, a friend of Nilsson's, who agreed to take US$20,000 for his narration (equivalent to $159,000 in 2025), but to be used on one broadcast only; for later airings of the film, the narration had to be re-recorded. The initial re-recording was done by actor Alan Barzman and was first used in the second ABC airing on December 7, 1974. The VHS and DVD releases, first issued on VHS by Vestron Video in 1985, feature another of Nilsson's friends, Ringo Starr, as the father. Another version, seen on cable television in the 1980s and 1990s, featured narration by Alan Thicke, and was first used on the Disney Channel on November 21, 1987. The voices of Oblio and the narrator's son were provided by Mike Lookinland, best known for playing Bobby Brady on the television series The Brady Bunch.

A 50th anniversary Blu-ray edition of the animated version (with the Ringo Starr narration) was released in February 2020.

=== Voice cast ===
Character	First Telecast	Second Telecast	Third Telecast	Home Video Releases
Narrator/Father	Dustin Hoffman	Alan Barzman	Alan Thicke	Ringo Starr

- Paul Frees as Oblio's Father/Pointed Man's Left Head/King/Leaf Man/Villagers
- Lennie Weinrib as Count/Pointed Man's Right Head/Villagers
- William E. Martin as Rock Man
- Buddy Foster as Count's Son
- Joan Gerber as Oblio's Mother/Pointed Man's Middle Head/Villagers/Children
- Mike Lookinland as Oblio

== Musical play ==
In the mid-1970s, Esquire Jauchem, artistic director of the Boston Repertory Theater, adapted and directed a stage musical version that starred 18-year-old David Morse as Oblio. The production later toured to the Trinity Repertory Company in Providence. In 1991, Nilsson gave Jauchem permission to remount his adaptation of The Point! at the Chapel Court Theatre in Hollywood, run by Richard and Tamara Merson, who had been involved in the Mermaid Theatre production in London, as well.

In 1976, a stage adaptation of The Point! was presented at the Mermaid Theatre in London. It was revived the following year, featuring Davy Jones and Micky Dolenz, both former members of the band The Monkees and long-time friends of Nilsson. To accommodate the expansion of The Point! to a full-length musical, other Nilsson songs from various points in his career were incorporated. An original cast album was released in the United Kingdom by MCA. A CD version was released by Varèse Sarabande on July 1, 2016, under license from Geffen, which controls the MCA Records catalogue via Universal Music.

=== London credits ===
==== 1976 Cast ====
- Wayne Sleep as Oblio
- Bernard Miles as The King
- Colin Bennett as The Count
- Ken Caswell as Count's Kid, The Pointed Man
- Cristina Avery as Count's Lady, The Pointed Man
- Jo Warne as Oblio's Mum, Balloon Lady
- Roy Sampson as Oblio's Dad, The Leafman
- Paul Aylett as Arrow
- Raymond Skipp as The Pointed Man
- Oscar James as The Rockman
- Peggy Ann Jones as Balloon Lady
- Alan Bodenham as Balloon Man
- Richard Merson as New Bird

==== 1977 Cast ====
- Davy Jones as Oblio
- Micky Dolenz as Count's Kid, The Leafman
- Colin Bennett as The Count
- David Claridge as Arrow
- Veronica Clifford as Oblio's Mum, Balloon Lady
- Noel Howlett as The King
- Julia Lewis as Oblio's Girlfriend
- Clovissa Newcombe as Count's Lady, The Pointed Man
- Mark Penfold as The Pointed Man
- Felix Rice as The Rockman
- Chrissy Roberts as Balloon Lady
- Denny Ryder as The Pointed Man
- Roy Sampson as Oblio's Dad
- Gary Taylor as Balloon Man, New Bird

Backing vocals were provided by Anna Macleod, Richard Barnes, and Jean Gilbert.

==== Crew ====
- Directed by Ron Pember (1976), Colin Bennett (1977)
- Original adaptation by Ron Pember and Bernard Miles
- Designed by Gary Lund
- Lighting by Peter Sutton
- Choreography by Gillian Gregory
- Musical director Mike McNaught

=== Track listing, original cast recording ===
All titles were written by Harry Nilsson, except "Thursday" (Nilsson, Danny Kortchmar).

1. Overture – Orchestra
2. "Everything's Got 'Em" – Company
3. "Me and My Arrow" – Davy Jones
4. "Poli High" – Company
5. "Remember" – Veronica Clifford
6. "To Be a King" – Noel Howlett and Company
7. "He's Leaving Here This Morning (Bath)" – Micky Dolenz, Colin Bennett, Clovissa Newcombe
8. "Think About Your Troubles" – Davy Jones and Company
9. "Blanket for a Sail" – Davy Jones
10. "Life Line" – Davy Jones'
11. "Thursday (Here's Why I Did Not Go to Work Today)" – Felix Rice
12. "It's a Jungle Out There" – Micky Dolenz
13. "P.O.V. Waltz" – Davy Jones and Company
14. "Are You Sleeping? (Song Title)" – Davy Jones and Company
15. "Gotta Get Up" – Davy Jones, Micky Dolenz
16. Reprise Overture – Orchestra
