= Anne Tyler =

American novelist (born 1941)

- Born: October 25, 1941 (age 85); Minneapolis, Minnesota, U.S.
- Education: Duke University (BA); Columbia University
- Occupations: Novelist; short story writer; literary critic
- Writing career
- Genre: Literary realism
- Notable works: Dinner at the Homesick Restaurant; The Accidental Tourist; Breathing Lessons
- Notable awards: National Book Critics Circle Award for Fiction (1985); Pulitzer Prize for Fiction (1989)
- Website: annetyler.com

Anne Tyler (born October 25, 1941) is an American novelist, short story writer, and literary critic. She has published twenty-five novels, including Dinner at the Homesick Restaurant (1982), The Accidental Tourist (1985), and Breathing Lessons (1988). All three were finalists for the Pulitzer Prize for Fiction, and Breathing Lessons won the prize in 1989. She has also won the Janet Heidinger Kafka Prize, the Ambassador Book Award, and the National Book Critics Circle Award. In 2012 she was awarded The Sunday Times Award for Literary Excellence. Tyler's twentieth novel, A Spool of Blue Thread, was shortlisted for the Man Booker Prize in 2015, and Redhead By the Side of the Road was longlisted for the same award in 2020.

She is recognized for her fully developed characters, her "brilliantly imagined and absolutely accurate detail", her "rigorous and artful style", and her "astute and open language."

Tyler has been compared to John Updike, Jane Austen, and Eudora Welty, among others.

== Early life and education ==
=== Early childhood ===
The oldest of four children, she was born in Minneapolis, Minnesota. Her father, Lloyd Parry Tyler, was an industrial chemist and her mother, Phyllis Mahon Tyler, a social worker. Both her parents were Quakers who were very active with social causes in the Midwest and the South. Her family lived in a succession of Quaker communities in the South until they settled in 1948 in a Quaker commune in Celo, in the mountains of North Carolina near Burnsville. The Celo Community settlement was populated largely by conscientious objectors and members of the liberal Hicksite branch of the Society of Friends. Tyler lived there from age seven through eleven and helped her parents and others care for livestock and organic farming. While she did not attend formal public school in Celo, lessons were taught in art, carpentry, and cooking in homes and in other subjects in a tiny school house. Her early informal training was supplemented by correspondence school.

Her first memory of her own creative story-telling was of crawling under the bed covers at age three and "telling myself stories in order to get to sleep at night." Her first book at age seven was a collection of drawings and stories about "lucky girls ... who got to go west in covered wagons." Her favorite book as a child was The Little House by Virginia Lee Burton. Tyler acknowledges that this book, which she read many times during this period of limited access to books, had a profound influence on her, showing "how the years flowed by, people altered, and nothing could ever stay the same." This early perception of changes over time is a theme that reappears in many of her novels decades later, just as The Little House itself appears in her novel Dinner at the Homesick Restaurant. Tyler also describes reading Little Women 22 times as a child. When the Tyler family left Celo after four years to move to Raleigh, North Carolina, eleven-year-old Tyler had never attended public school and never used a telephone. This unorthodox upbringing enabled her to view "the normal world with a certain amount of distance and surprise."

Tyler felt herself to be an outsider in the public schools she attended in Raleigh, a feeling that has followed her most of her life. She suggests that this sense of being an outsider has contributed to her becoming a writer: "I believe that any kind of setting-apart situation will do [to become a writer]. In my case, it was emerging from the commune ... and trying to fit into the outside world." Despite her lack of public schooling prior to age eleven, Anne entered school academically well ahead of most of her classmates in Raleigh. With access now to libraries, she discovered Eudora Welty, Gabriel García Márquez, F. Scott Fitzgerald, and many others. Eudora Welty remains one of her favorite writers, and The Wide Net and Other Stories is one of her favorite books; she has called Welty "my crowning influence." She credits Welty with showing her that books could be about the everyday details of life, not just about major events. During her years at Needham B. Broughton High School in Raleigh, she was inspired and encouraged by a remarkable English teacher, Phyllis Peacock. "Mrs. Peacock" had previously taught the writer Reynolds Price, under whom Tyler would later study at Duke University. Peacock would also later teach the writer Armistead Maupin. Seven years after high school, Tyler would dedicate her first published novel to "Mrs. Peacock, for everything you've done."

When Tyler graduated from high school at age sixteen, she wanted to attend Swarthmore College, a school founded in 1860 by the Hicksite branch of the Society of Friends. However, she had won a full AB Duke scholarship to Duke University, and her parents pressured her to go to Duke because they needed to save money for the education of her three younger brothers. At Duke, Tyler enrolled in Reynolds Price's first creative writing class, which also included a future poet, Fred Chappell. Price was most impressed with the sixteen-year-old Tyler, describing her as "frighteningly mature for 16," "wide-eyed," and "an outsider." Years later Price would describe Tyler as "one of the best novelists alive in the world, ... who was almost as good a writer at 16 as she is now." Tyler took an additional creative writing course with Price and also studied under William Blackburn, who also had taught William Styron, Josephine Humphreys, and James Applewhite at Duke, as well as Price and Chappell.

As a college student, Tyler had not yet determined she wanted to become a writer. She loved painting and the visual arts. She also was involved in the drama society in high school and at Duke, where she acted in a number of plays, playing Laura in The Glass Menagerie and Mrs. Gibbs in Our Town. She majored in Russian Literature at Duke and graduated in 1961, at age nineteen, having been inducted into Phi Beta Kappa. With her Russian Literature background she received a fellowship to graduate school in Slavic Studies at Columbia University.

Living in New York City was quite an adjustment for her. There she became somewhat addicted to riding trains and subways: "While I rode I often felt like I was ... an enormous eye taking things in, turning them over and sorting them out ... writing was the only way" [to express her observations]. Tyler left Columbia graduate school after a year, having completed course work but not her master's thesis. She returned to Duke, where she got a job in the library as a Russian bibliographer. It was there that she met Taghi Modarressi, a resident in child psychiatry in Duke Medical School and a writer himself, and they were married seven months later (1963).

== Career ==
=== Early writing and first publications ===
While an undergraduate at Duke, Tyler published her short story "Laura" in the Duke literary journal Archive, for which she won the newly created Anne Flexner award for creative writing. In college and prior to her marriage, she wrote many short stories, one of which impressed Reynolds Price so that he later stated that it was the "most finished, most accomplished short story I have ever received from an undergraduate in my thirty years of teaching." "The Saints in Caesar's Household" was published in Archive also and won her a second Anne Flexner award. This short story led to her meeting Diarmuid Russell, to whom Price had sent it with kudos. Russell, who was an agent for both Reynolds Price and for Tyler's "crowning influence" Eudora Welty, later became Tyler's agent.

While working at the Duke University library—before and after marrying Modarressi—Tyler did continue to write short stories and started work on her first novel, If Morning Ever Comes. During this period her short stories appeared in The New Yorker, The Saturday Evening Post, and Harpers. After the couple moved to Montreal—Modarressi's U.S. visa had expired and they moved there so he could finish his residency—Tyler continued writing while looking for work. Her first novel was published in 1964 and The Tin Can Tree was published the next year. Years later she disowned both of these novels, as well as many of the short stories she wrote during this period. She has even written that she "would like to burn them." She feels that most of this early work suffers from the lack of thorough character development and her failure to rework material repeatedly.

In 1965 at age 24, Tyler had her first child, a daughter they named Tezh. Two years later a second daughter, Mitra, was born. About this time, the couple moved to Baltimore, MD as Taghi had finished his residency and obtained a position at the University of Maryland Medical School. With the moves, the changes in jobs, and the raising of two young children, Tyler had little time or energy for writing and published nothing between 1965 and 1970. She settled comfortably in the city of Baltimore where she has remained and where she has set most of her subsequent novels. Baltimore is generally considered to have a true mix of Southern and Northern culture. It also is an area of considerable Quaker presence, and Tyler eventually enrolled both her daughters in a local Friends school. During this period she began writing literary reviews for journals, newspapers, etc. to provide the family with additional income; she would continue this employment until the late 1980s, writing approximately 250 reviews in total. While this period was not productive for her writing career, Tyler does feel that this time enriched her spirit and her experience and in turn gave her subsequent writing greater depth, as she had "more of a self to speak from."

Tyler began writing again in 1970 and had published three more novels by 1974: A Slipping-Down Life, The Clock Winder, and Celestial Navigation. In her own opinion, her writing improved considerably during this period; with her children entering school, she was able to devote a great deal more focus to it than had been possible since she graduated from Duke. With Celestial Navigation, Tyler began to get national recognition: Gail Godwin gave it a very favorable review in the New York Times Review of Books. While she is not proud of her first four novels, Tyler considers this fifth novel one of her favorites. It was a difficult book to write she notes, since it required rewriting draft after draft to truly develop her understanding of the characters. John Updike gave a favorable review to her next novel, Searching for Caleb, writing: "Funny and lyric and true, exquisite in its details and ambitious in its design ... This writer is not merely good, she is wickedly good." Afterwards he proceeded to take an interest in her work and reviewed her next four novels as well. Morgan's Passing (1980) won the Janet Heidinger Kafka Prize for Fiction and was nominated for both the American Book Awards and the National Book Critics Circle Award. Joyce Carol Oates gave it good review in Mademoiselle: "Fascinating ... So unconventional a love story that it appears to take its protagonists themselves by surprise."

=== National recognition ===
With her next novel, Tyler truly arrived as a recognized artist in the literary world. Tyler's ninth novel, Dinner at the Homesick Restaurant, which she considers her best work, was a finalist for the Pulitzer Prize, PEN/Faulkner Award, and the American Book Award for Fiction in 1983. In his review in The New Yorker, John Updike wrote, "Her art needed only the darkening that would give her beautifully shaped sketches solidity ... In her ninth novel, she has arrived at a new level of power." Her tenth novel, The Accidental Tourist, was awarded the National Book Critics Circle Award for Fiction in 1985, the Ambassador Book Award for Fiction in 1986, and was a finalist for the Pulitzer Prize in 1986. It was also made into a 1988 movie starring William Hurt and Geena Davis. The critical and commercial success of the film further increased the public awareness of her work. Her 11th novel, Breathing Lessons, received the Pulitzer Prize for Fiction in 1989 and was Time magazine's "Book of the Year". It was adapted into a 1994 TV movie, as eventually were four other of her novels.

Since her Pulitzer Prize with Breathing Lessons, Tyler has written 13 more novels; many have been Book of the Month Club main selections and have become New York Times Bestsellers. Ladder of Years was chosen by Time as one of the ten best books of 1995. A Patchwork Planet was a New York Times Notable Book (1999). Saint Maybe (1991) and Back When We Were Grownups (2001) were adapted into TV movies in 1998 and 2004, respectively. In her 2006 novel Digging to America, she explored how an immigrant from Iran, who has lived in the U. S. for 35 years, deals with her "outsiderness," perspectives with which Tyler is familiar due to her marriage to Iranian psychiatrist Taghi Mohammad Modarressi.

In addition to her novels, Tyler has published short stories in The New Yorker, The Saturday Evening Post, Redbook, McCall's, and Harper's, but they have never been published as a collection. Her stories include "Average Waves in Unprotected Waters" (1977), "Holding Things Together" (1977), and "Teenage Wasteland" (1983). Between 1983 and 1996, she edited three anthologies: The Best American Short Stories 1983, Best of the South, and Best of the South: The Best of the Second Decade.

== Personal life ==
In 1963, Tyler married Iranian psychiatrist and novelist Taghi Mohammad Modarressi. Modarressi, ten years her senior, had left Iran and his family as a political refugee at age 25. After a year and a half internship in Wichita, Kansas, he obtained a residency in child psychiatry at Duke University Medical School. There he met Tyler and discovered their common interest in literature. Modarressi had written two award-winning novels in Persian and so was quite an accomplished writer himself. He later wrote three more novels, two of which Tyler helped to translate to English (The Book of Absent People and The Pilgrim's Rules of Etiquette). In the 1980s, Modarressi founded the Center for Infant Study in Baltimore and the Cold Spring Family Center Therapeutic Nursery in Pimlico, Maryland, which dealt with children who had experienced emotional trauma. Modarressi died in 1997 at the age of 65, from lymphoma.

Tyler and Modarressi had two daughters, Tezh and Mitra. Both share their mother's interest in, and talent for, painting. Tezh is a professional photographer, and an artist who works primarily in oils, who painted the cover of her mother's novel, Ladder of Years. Mitra is a professional illustrator working primarily in watercolors. She has illustrated seven books, including two children's books co-authored with Tyler (Tumble Tower and Timothy Tugbottom Says No!).

Tyler resides in the Roland Park neighborhood of Baltimore, Maryland, where most of her novels are set. Today tourists can even take an "Anne Tyler tour" of the area. For some time she was noteworthy among contemporary best-selling novelists, for she rarely granted face-to-face interviews nor did book tours nor made other public appearances. In 2012 she broke with this policy and gave her first face-to-face interview in almost 40 years; subsequently, Mark Lawson interviewed her on BBC Radio in 2013 about her approach to writing. In 2015, she discussed her 20th novel, A Spool of Blue Thread, in a live radio interview with Diane Rehm and callers on The Diane Rehm Show. In 2025, she gave an interview for CBS Sunday Morning conducted by Robert Costa.

== Writing style, influences, and philosophy ==
=== Classification of her literature ===
Tyler has occasionally been classified as a "Southern author" or a "modern American author." The Southern category apparently results from the fact that she grew up and went to college in the South. Also, she admired and/or studied under well-known Southern authors Eudora Welty and Reynolds Price. In a rare interview with The New York Times, Tyler cited Eudora Welty as a major literary influence: "Reading Eudora Welty when I was growing up showed me that very small things are often really larger than the large things". However, poet and author Katha Pollitt notes, "It is hard to classify Anne Tyler's novels. They are Southern in their sure sense of family and place but lack the taste for violence and the Gothic that often characterizes self-consciously southern literature. They are modern in their fictional techniques, yet utterly unconcerned with contemporary moment as a subject, so that, with only minor dislocations, her stories could just as well have taken place in the twenties or thirties."

It is also difficult to classify Tyler in terms of themes; as she herself notes, "I don't think of my work in terms of themes. I'm just trying to tell a story." Tyler goes on to say, "Any large 'questions of life' that emerge in my novels are accidental—not a reason for writing the novel in the first place but either (1) questions that absorb my characters, quite apart from me, or (2) on occasion, questions that may be thematic to my own life at the moment, even if I'm not entirely aware of them. Answers, if they come, come from the characters' experiences, not from mine, and I often find myself viewing those answers with a sort of distant, bemused surprise."

=== Characters and detailed descriptions ===
In Tyler's works, the characters are the driving forces behind the stories and the starting point for her writing: "I do make a point of writing down every imaginable facet of my characters before I begin a book, trying to get to know them, so I can figure out how they'll react in any situation ... My reason for writing now is to live lives other than my own, and I do that by burrowing deeper and deeper ... till I reach the center of those lives." In 1976, Pollitt described her skill in this way: "Tyler [is] polishing brighter and brighter a craft many novelists no longer deem essential to their purpose: the unfolding of character through brilliantly imagined and absolutely accurate detail."

Twelve years later, Michiko Kakutani, in her review of Breathing Lessons, praised "[Tyler's] ability to select details that reveal precisely how her characters feel and think" and her "gift for sympathy, for presenting each character's case with humor and compassion." Kakutani later went on to note that "each character in Saint Maybe has been fully rendered, fleshed out with a palpable interior life, and each has been fit, like a hand-sawed jigsaw-puzzle piece, into the matrix of family life." Carol Shields, also writing about her characters, observes: "Tyler has always put her characters to work. Their often humble or eccentric occupations, carefully observed and threaded with humor, are tightly sewn to the other parts of their lives, offering them the mixed benefit of tedium and consolation, as well as a lighted stage for the unfolding of their dramatic selves. She also allows her men and women an opportunity for redemption."

Tyler has spoken about the importance of her characters to her stories: "As far as I'm concerned, character is everything. I never did see why I have to throw in a plot, too." In a 1977 interview, she stated that "the real joy of writing is how people can surprise one. My people wander around my study until the novel is done. It's one reason I'm very careful not to write about people I don't like. If I find somebody creeping in that I'm not really fond of, I usually take him out." Pollitt had even earlier noted how Tyler's characters seem to take on a life of their own that she doesn't seem to totally control: "Her complex, crotchety inventions surprise us, but one senses they surprise her too."

=== Realism through details ===
Just as Tyler is difficult to categorize as a novelist, it is also challenging to label her style. Novelist Cathleen Schine describes how her "style without a style" manages to pull the reader into the story: "So rigorous and artful is the style without a style, so measured and delicate is each observation, so complex is the structure and so astute and open the language, that the reader can relax, feel secure in the narrative and experience the work as something real and natural -- even inevitable." The San Francisco Chronicle made a similar point: "One does not so much read a Tyler novel as visit it. Her ability to conduct several conversations at once while getting the food to the table turns the act of reading into a kind of transport." Reviewer Tom Shone put it this way: "You're involved before you ever notice you were paying attention." Joyce Carol Oates, in her review of The Amateur Marriage, perhaps described the phenomenon best: "When the realistic novel works its magic, you won't simply have read about the experiences of fictitious characters, you will have seemed to have lived them; your knowledge of their lives transcends their own, for they can only live in chronological time. The experience of reading such fiction when it's carefully composed can be breathtaking, like being given the magical power of reliving passages of our own lives, indecipherable at the time of being lived."

=== Focus on family and marriage ===
While Tyler herself does not like to think of her novels in terms of themes, numerous reviewers and scholars have noted the importance of family and marriage relationships to her characters and stories. Liesl Schillinger summarized: "Taken together, the distinct but overlapping worlds of her novels have formed a Sensurround literary record of the 20th century American family—or, at least, of the proud but troubled archetypal families that ... interested her most." New York Times critic Michiko Kakutani has been reviewing Tyler's novels for over 25 years. She has frequently noted Tyler's themes with regard to family and marriage. Reviewing Noah's Compass, Kakutani states that "the central concern of most of this author's characters has always been their need to define themselves in terms of family—the degree to which they see themselves as creatures shaped by genetics, childhood memories and parental and spousal expectations, and the degree to which they are driven to embrace independent identities of their own.". This is an example of where Anne Tyler got some of her characteristics from, being able to be independent and get to know herself through her writing.

Reviewing Saint Maybe, Jay Parini describes how Tyler's characters must deal with "Ms. Tyler's oddball families, which any self-respecting therapist would call 'dysfunctional' ... An inexplicable centripetal force hurls these relatives upon one another, catches them in a dizzying inward spiral of obligation, affection and old-fashioned guilt—as well as an inexpressible longing for some perfect or "normal" family in a distant past that never really was. Almost every novel by Anne Tyler begins with a loss or absence that reactivates in the family some primordial sense of itself." Larry McMurtry wrote, "in book after book, siblings are drawn inexorably back home, as if their parents or (more often) grandparents had planted tiny magnets in them which can be activated once they have seen what the extrafamilial world is like. ... sooner or later a need to be with people who are really familiar – their brothers and sisters – overwhelms them."

Novelist Julia Glass has similarly written about Tyler's characters' families: "What makes each story distinctive is the particular way its characters rebel against hereditary confines, cope with fateful crises or forge relationships with new acquaintances who rock their world." In the same way, Glass mentions the frequent role of marriage struggles in her work: "Once again, Tyler exhibits her genius for the incisive, savory portrayal of marriage, of the countless perverse ways in which two individuals sustain a shared existence." McMurtry puts it this way, "The fates of [Tyler's] families hinge on long struggles between semiattentive males and semiobsessed females. In her patient investigation of such struggles, Miss Tyler has produced a very satisfying body of fiction.

=== Passage of time and the role of small, chance events ===
The role of the passage of time and its impact on Tyler's characters is always present. The stories in many of her novels span decades, if only by flashbacks. Joyce Carol Oates emphasized the role of time in this manner: "[Tyler's novels] move at times as if plotless in the meandering drift of actual life, it is time itself that constitutes "plot": meaning is revealed through a doubling-back upon time in flashes of accumulated memory, those heightened moments which James Joyce aptly called epiphanies. The minutiae of family life can yield a startling significance seen from the right perspective, as Tyler shows us." With regard to those minutiae, Tyler herself comments: "As for huge events vs. small events: I believe they all count. They all reveal character, which is the factor that most concerns me ... It does fascinate me, though, that small details can be so meaningful."

Kakutani described Saint Maybe in a similar manner: "Moving back and forth among the points of view of various characters, Ms. Tyler traces two decades in the lives of the Bedloes, showing us the large and small events that shape family members' lives and the almost imperceptible ways in which feelings of familial love and obligation mutate over the years." Again in her review of Breathing Lessons, Kakutani perceives that "she is able, with her usual grace and magnanimity, to chronicle the ever-shifting covenants made by parents and children, husbands and wives, and in doing so, to depict both the losses – and redemptions – wrought by the passage of time." Tyler herself further weighs in upon how small events can impact relationships: "I love to think about chance -- about how one little overheard word, one pebble in a shoe, can change the universe ... The real heroes, to me, in my books are first the ones who manage to endure."

== Criticism ==
Tyler is not without her critics. The most common criticism is that her works are "sentimental," "sweet," and "charming and cosy." John Blades, literary critic for the Chicago Tribune, skewered The Accidental Tourist (as well as all her earlier novels) as "artificially sweet" and "unrealistic." The Observer's Adam Mars-Jones stated, in his review of The Amateur Marriage: "Tyler seems to be offering milk and cookies." Kakutani has also occasionally bemoaned a "cloying cuteness," noting that "her novels—with their eccentric heroes, their homespun details, their improbable, often heartwarming plots—have often flirted with cuteness."

In a 2012 interview, Tyler responded to such criticisms: "For one thing I think it is sort of true. I would say: piss and vinegar for [Philip] Roth—and, for me, milk and cookies. I can't deny it ... [However] there's more edge under some of my soft language than people realize." Because almost all of Tyler's work covers the same territory—family and marriage relationships—and are located in the same setting, she has come under criticism for being repetitive and formulaic. Reviewing The Patchwork Planet, Kakutani states: "Ms. Tyler's earlier characters tended to be situated within a thick matrix of finely nuanced familial relationships that helped define both their dreams and their limitations; the people in this novel, in contrast, seem much more like lone wolves, pulled this way and that by the author's puppet strings ... Ms. Tyler's famous ability to limn the daily minutiae of life also feels weary and formulaic this time around ... As for the little details Ms. Tyler sprinkles over her story ... they, too, have a paint-by-numbers touch. They add up to a patchwork novel that feels hokey, mechanical ... and yes, too cute.

Tyler has also been criticized for her male characters' "Sad Sack" nature and their "lack of testosterone". Tyler has disagreed with this criticism: "Oh, that always bothers me so much. I don't think they are wimps. People are always saying, 'We understand you write about quirky characters,' and I think... 'Isn't everybody quirky? If you look very closely at anybody, you'll find impediments—women and men both.'"

== Work habits ==
Over the last couple of decades, Tyler has been quite forthcoming about her work habits—both in written articles and in interviews. She is disciplined and consistent about her work schedule and environment, starting in the early morning and generally working until 2 p.m. Since she moved to the Roland Park neighborhood of Baltimore, she has used a small, orderly corner room in her house, where the only distractions are the sounds of "children playing outside, and birds." She has noted that at the beginning of her day, taking the first step—entering her corner room—can be difficult and daunting. She begins her writing by reviewing her previous day's work and then staring off into space for a time. She describes this phase of writing as an "extension of daydreaming," and it focuses her mind on her characters.

Over the years Tyler has kept files of note cards on which she has recorded ideas and observations. Characters, descriptions and scenes often emerge from these notes. She says the act of putting words to paper for her is a very mechanical process," involving a number of steps: (1) writing first in longhand on unlined paper, (2) revising longhand versions, (3) typing the entire manuscript, (4) rewriting in longhand, (5) reading into a tape recorder while listening for "false notes," (6) playing back into a stenographic machine using the pause button to enter changes. She can be quite organized, going so far as to map out floor plans of houses and to outline the chronology of all the characters in a given novel.

In 2013, Tyler gave the following advice to beginning writers: "They should run out and buy the works of Erving Goffman, the sociologist who studied the meaning of gesture in personal interactions. I have cause to think about Erving Goffman nearly every day of my life, every time I see people do something unconscious that reveals more than they'll ever know about their interiors. Aren't human beings intriguing? I could go on writing about them forever."

== Bibliography ==
=== Novels ===
- If Morning Ever Comes (1964)
- The Tin Can Tree (1965)
- A Slipping-Down Life (1970)
- The Clock Winder (1972)
- Celestial Navigation (1974)
- Searching for Caleb (1975)
- Earthly Possessions (1977)
- Morgan's Passing (1980)
- Dinner at the Homesick Restaurant (1982)
- The Accidental Tourist (1985)
- Breathing Lessons (1988)
- Saint Maybe (1991)
- Ladder of Years (1995)
- A Patchwork Planet (1998)
- Back When We Were Grownups (2001)
- The Amateur Marriage (2004)
- Digging to America (2006)
- Noah's Compass (2009)
- The Beginner's Goodbye (2012)
- A Spool of Blue Thread (2015)
- Vinegar Girl (2016)
- Clock Dance (2018)
- Redhead by the Side of the Road (2020)
- French Braid (2022)
- Three Days in June (2025)
- The Return Trip Is Shorter (2027)

=== Other ===
- Tumble Tower (1993) A children's book illustrated by her daughter Mitra Modarressi
- Timothy Tugbottom Says No! (2005) A children's book illustrated by Mitra Modarressi

=== Short stories ===
Although Tyler's short stories have been published in The New Yorker, The Saturday Evening Post, Redbook, McCall's, and Harper's, they have not been published as a collection. Her stories include:

- "Laura," Archive, March 1959
- "Lights on the River," Archive, October 1959
- "The Bridge," Archive, March 1960
- "I Never Saw Morning," Archive, April 1961
- "The Baltimore Birth Certificate," The Critic, February–March 1963
- "I Play Kings," Seventeen, August 1963
- "A Street of Bugles," The Saturday Evening Post, November 30, 1963
- "Nobody Answers the Door," The Antioch Review 24.3, Autumn 1964
- "Dry Water," The Southern Review, Spring 1965
- "I'm Not Going to Ask You Again," Harper's, September 1965
- "The Saints in Caesar's Household," Archive, September 1966
- "As the Earth Gets Old," The New Yorker, October 29, 1966
- "Two People and a Clock on the Wall," The New Yorker, November 19, 1966
- "The Tea-Machine," The Southern Review 3.1, Winter 1967
- "The Genuine Fur Eyelashes," Mademoiselle, January 1967
- "The Tea-Machine," The Southern Review, Winter 1967
- "The Feather Behind the Rock," The New Yorker, August 12, 1967
- "A Flaw in the Crust of the Earth," The Reporter, November 2, 1967
- "Who Would Want a Little Boy?" Ladies Home Journal, May 1968
- "The Common Courtesies," McCall's, June 1968—and The O. Henry Prize Stories 1969
- "With All Flags Flying," Redbook, June 1971—and The O. Henry Prize Stories 1972
- "Outside," Southern Review 7.4, Autumn 1971
- "The Bride in the Boatyard," McCall's, June 1972
- "Respect," Mademoiselle, June 1972
- "A Misstep of the Mind," Seventeen, October 1972
- "Spending," Shenandoah, Winter 1973
- "The Base-Metal Egg," The Southern Review, Summer 1973
- "Neutral Ground," Family Circle, November 1974
- "Half-Truths and Semi-Miracles," Cosmopolitan, December 1974
- "A Knack for Languages," The New Yorker, January 13, 1975
- "The Artificial Family," The Southern Review, Summer 1975
- "The Geologist's Maid," The New Yorker, July 28, 1975
- "Some Sign That I Ever Made You Happy," McCall's, October 1975
- "Your Place Is Empty," The New Yorker, November 22, 1976—and Best American Short Stories 1977
- "Holding Things Together", The New Yorker, January 24, 1977
- "Average Waves in Unprotected Waters," The New Yorker, February 28, 1977
- "Under the Bosom Tree," Archive, Spring 1977
- "Foot-Footing On," Mademoiselle, November 1977
- "Uncle Ahmad," Quest, November–December 1977
- "Teenage Wasteland," Seventeen, November 1983
- "Rerun," The New Yorker, July 4, 1988
- "A Woman Like a Fieldstone House," Ladies' Home Journal, August 1989
- "People Who Don't Know the Answers," The New Yorker, August 26, 1991

=== Film adaptations ===
- The Accidental Tourist (1988)
- Breathing Lessons (TV) (1994)
- Saint Maybe (TV) (1998)
- A Slipping-Down Life (1999)
- Earthly Possessions (TV) (1999)
- Back When We Were Grownups (TV) (2004)

== Awards ==
Tyler has been a member of the American Academy of Arts and Letters since 1983.

for Morgan's Passing (1980):

- Janet Heidinger Kafka Prize for Fiction
- nominated, American Book Award for Fiction
- nominated, National Book Critics Circle Award for Fiction

for Dinner at the Homesick Restaurant (1982):

- Finalist, Pulitzer Prize for Fiction
- Finalist, PEN/Faulkner Award
- Finalist, American Book Award for Fiction

for The Accidental Tourist (1985):

- 1985 National Book Critics Circle Award for Fiction
- 1986 Ambassador Book Award for Fiction
- Finalist, Pulitzer Prize for Fiction

for Breathing Lessons (1988):

- Pulitzer Prize for Fiction (1989)
- Time's "Book of the Year"

for Ladder of Years (1995):

- Finalist, The Orange Prize for Fiction 1996

for Digging to America (2006):

- Finalist, The Orange Prize for Fiction 2007

for A Spool of Blue Thread (2015):

- Finalist, The Man Booker Prize 2015
- Finalist, The Baileys Women's Prize for Fiction 2015

for Redhead By the Side of the Road (2020):

- Longlist, The Man Booker Prize 2020

for Lifetime achievement:

- Finalist, The Man Booker International Prize 2011
- The Sunday Times Award for Literary Excellence 2012
