= Earthly Possessions (film) =

- DVD cover
- Based on: Earthly Possessions by Anne Tyler
- Written by: Steven Rogers
- Directed by: James Lapine
- Starring: Susan Sarandon; Stephen Dorff
- Music by: Stephen Endelman
- Country of origin: United States
- Original language: English

Production
- Producers: Sue Jett; Tony Mark
- Cinematography: David Franco
- Editor: Barbara Tulliver
- Running time: 103 minutes
- Production companies: Rastar; HBO Pictures

Original release
- Network: HBO
- Release: March 20, 1999

Earthly Possessions is a 1999 American romantic drama television film directed by James Lapine and starring Susan Sarandon and Stephen Dorff. The film originally premiered on HBO on March 20, 1999.

== Plot ==
An adaptation of Anne Tyler's novel of the same name about a middle aged housewife who feels her life is going nowhere, Charlotte Emory, plans to withdraw all the money from her bank account and leave her husband, a minister who has been taking her for granted for years. Then a young bank robber, Jake Sims, grabs her at gunpoint, takes her hostage and they make their getaway on a bus.
