= Morgan's Passing =

1980 novel by Anne Tyler

- First edition cover
- Author: Anne Tyler
- Language: English
- Publisher: Knopf
- Publication date: 1980
- Publication place: United States
- Media type: Print (Hardcover and Paperback)
- Pages: 311 pp
- ISBN: 9780804108812
- OCLC: 5353607
- Dewey Decimal: 813/.5/4
- LC Class: PZ4.T979 Mo 1980 PS3570.Y45 (79020272 )

Morgan's Passing is a 1980 novel by Anne Tyler. It won the 1980 Janet Heidinger Kafka Prize for Fiction and was nominated for both the American Book Awards and the National Book Critics Circle Award.

== Plot summary ==
Morgan Gower is a middle-aged husband, father, and hardware store employee. He feels marginalized in his domestic life and understimulated at work. Dissatisfied with a life that has not fulfilled his aspirations, Gower maintains a wardrobe of costumes —priest, riverboat gambler, Daniel Boone—which he wears almost daily while walking through Baltimore, seeking an identity in which he feels at ease.

One day, he encounters a young couple, Emily and Leon Meredith, performing a puppet show in public. After the show, Emily goes into labor, and Gower, posing as "Doctor Morgan" delivers the baby in the backseat of his car. Over the following years, a restless Morgan repeatedly encounters the couple—seemingly by accident—and gradually befriends them. Leon and Emily are revealed to be an unhappy couple: Leon is a frustrated actor reduced to a puppeteering, while Emily appears uncertain of what she wants. Gower becomes increasingly drawn to Emily, eventually beginning an affair with her. When Emily becomes pregnant with Gower's child, they leave their respective spouses and start a new life together. Gower adopts Leon's identity, achieving a sense of contentment.

== Reviews ==
John Leonard of The New York Times said, "Morgan, like a novelist, wants to be everybody else in order to look at himself through innocent eyes, to be charmed....Miss Tyler, witty, civilized, curious, with her radar ears and her quill pen dipped on one page in acid and on the next in orange liqueur, is asking whether art is adequate to the impersonations life insists on, death absolves. She is a wonderful writer."

In The New York Review of Books, James Wolcott compared Tyler to a "sentry or a detective [who] seems to notice everything: the pale fluorescent gloom of laundromats, pockets filled with lint-covered jellybeans, the smell of crabcakes and coconut oil on a Delaware beach, grapy veins in the calves of middle-aged mothers. As a chronicler of domestic fuss, Tyler can be compared to John Updike."

== See also ==
- John Updike
