= The Tin Can Tree =

1965 novel by Anne Tyler

- 1st edition cover, New York, 1965
- Author: Anne Tyler
- Language: English
- Publisher: Knopf
- Publication date: 1965
- Publication place: United States
- Media type: Print (Hardcover and Paperback)
- Pages: 273
- ISBN: 978-0449911891
- OCLC: 1378876
- Dewey Decimal: 813/.5/4
- LC Class: PZ4.T979 Ti PS3570.Y45 (65018762)

The Tin Can Tree is a 1965 novel by Anne Tyler.

== Plot summary ==
The Pike family, including ten-year-old Simon Pike, are trying to carry on after the tragic, accidental death of six-year-old Janie Rose Pike. The brothers Ansel and James, neighbors of the Pike family, also pitch in to lend support to the Pikes. In the end, the Pikes learn that even after the traumatic death of a young soul, life still continues and they cannot mourn forever.

== Reviews ==
- Christopher Lehmann-Haupt: "The Tin Can Tree" The New York Times (December 23, 1965).
