= The Accidental Tourist (film) =

1988 film by Lawrence Kasdan

- Theatrical release poster
- Directed by: Lawrence Kasdan
- Screenplay by: Frank Galati; Lawrence Kasdan
- Based on: The Accidental Tourist by Anne Tyler
- Produced by: Lawrence Kasdan; Charles Okun; Michael Grillo
- Starring: William Hurt; Kathleen Turner; Geena Davis
- Cinematography: John Bailey
- Edited by: Carol Littleton
- Music by: John Williams
- Distributed by: Warner Bros.
- Release date: December 23, 1988
- Running time: 121 minutes
- Country: United States
- Language: English
- Budget: $15 million
- Box office: $32.6 million

The Accidental Tourist is a 1988 American romantic comedy-drama film directed and co-produced by Lawrence Kasdan from a screenplay by Frank Galati and Kasdan, based on the 1985 novel of the same name by Anne Tyler. The film stars William Hurt, Kathleen Turner, and Geena Davis. Its plot follows a travel writer who is struggling to cope with the sudden death of his son and the breakdown of his marriage. As he retreats into his solitary life, an eccentric dog trainer helps him rediscover love and his sense of purpose.

The Accidental Tourist was released on December 23, 1988, to critical acclaim, with praise for its thoughtful exploration of grief and performances of the cast, with high praise directed towards Davis' performance. The film emerged as a moderate commercial success at the box-office, grossing over $32.6 million worldwide against a budget of approximately $15 million.

At the 61st Academy Awards, The Accidental Tourist received 4 nominations, including Best Picture, with Davis winning Best Supporting Actress. The film also won the New York Film Critics Circle Award for Best Film, while also being nominated for the Golden Globe Award for Best Motion Picture – Drama and the BAFTA Award for Best Adapted Screenplay.

== Plot ==
Macon Leary is a Baltimore writer of travel guides that detail how reluctant business travelers can best avoid unpleasantness and difficulty.

His marriage to his wife Sarah is disintegrating in the aftermath of the tragic death of their 12-year-old son, Ethan. Macon is leveraging the philosophy he espouses in his travel guides to keep control of himself, his grief, and his life, and this excessive control is becoming increasingly dysfunctional. Sarah eventually leaves Macon, moving out of their house and into an apartment, leaving him with the house and the family dog, Edward.

Macon meets Muriel Pritchett, an eccentric animal hospital employee and dog trainer with a sickly son named Alexander. Macon eventually hires Muriel to put his dog through much-needed obedience training after Edward causes Macon to fall down the stairs and break his leg. Muriel is quite forward in her interest in Macon, which acts as a counterforce to his stiff personality. Although Muriel at first seems brash and unsophisticated, Macon eventually finds himself opening up to her and trusting her. Over time, he moves into her apartment and becomes a father figure to Alexander. Some conflict arises between Muriel and Macon when he offers to help with private school costs. Muriel wants more commitment to the relationship and fears another disappointment. When Sarah's apartment lease is up, she moves back into their old home and suggests to Macon that they start over. Macon leaves Muriel, and he and Sarah set up house once more.

Macon travels to Paris for research, and to his surprise, Muriel appears on the same flight and stays at the same hotel he recommended in one of his travel guides. Muriel suggests they pretend to be on a vacation together, but Macon maintains a professional stance, emphasizing his business purpose. Despite his aloofness, he shows concern for Alexander.

On Macon's last night in Paris, Muriel asks to accompany him, giving him time to decide. Later, Macon, experiencing back pain from a phone cord accident, is bedridden. Muriel, assuming he left, departs. Macon contacts his publisher, and Sarah comes to assist him. Sarah proposes turning their trip into a second honeymoon after his work is done, and Macon agrees half-heartedly. Sarah, however, questions his feelings for Muriel, hinting at unresolved issues related to their son.

Macon realizes their marriage is strained without their son and decides to seek Muriel's help to move past his grief. He leaves for Muriel, explaining his need for her support. As he departs, he leaves his bag behind. A boy resembling Ethan helps him with a taxi. Macon sees Muriel hailing a taxi and stops his own. She smiles at him, and he smiles back, indicating a potential new connection.

== Cast ==
- William Hurt as Macon Leary
- Kathleen Turner as Sarah Leary
- Geena Davis as Muriel Pritchett
- Bill Pullman as Julian Hedge
- Amy Wright as Rose Leary
- David Ogden Stiers as Porter Leary
- Ed Begley Jr. as Charles Leary
- Robert Hy Gorman as Alexander Pritchett
- Bradley Mott as Mr. Loomis
- Seth Granger as Ethan Leary
- Jake Kasdan as Scott Canfield
- Jonathan Kasdan as boy at doctor's office
- Peggy Converse as Mrs. Barrett
- Walter Sparrow as hot dog vendor
- Paul Williamson as London hotel manager
- Audrey Rapoport as girl on plane
- Meg Kasdan as receptionist

== Reception ==
The Accidental Tourist holds an 82% rating on Rotten Tomatoes based on 33 reviews, with an average rating of 7.3/10. The site's critical consensus reads, "Generous with its character's foibles and virtues, The Accidental Tourist is a thoughtful drama vested with insight into the complications of relationships." On Metacritic, the film has a score of 53 out of 100, based on 12 critics, indicating "mixed or average reviews". Additionally, audiences polled by CinemaScore gave the film, an average grade of "B" on an A+ to F scale.

Roger Ebert gave The Accidental Tourist a glowing review, calling it "one of the best films of the year", while praising its direction, screenplay, mix of emotional depth and humor, and the performances of the cast, with Hurt and Davis receiving high praise in particular.

== Accolades ==
Award	Category	Nominee(s)	Result
Academy Awards	Best Picture	Lawrence Kasdan, Charles Okun and Michael Grillo	Nominated
Academy Awards	Best Supporting Actress	Geena Davis	Won
Academy Awards	Best Screenplay – Based on Material from Another Medium	Frank Galati and Lawrence Kasdan	Nominated
Academy Awards	Best Original Score	John Williams	Nominated
British Academy Film Awards	Best Adapted Screenplay	Frank Galati and Lawrence Kasdan	Nominated
Cahiers du Cinéma	Best Film	Lawrence Kasdan	10th Place
Golden Globe Awards	Best Motion Picture – Drama		Nominated
Golden Globe Awards	Best Original Score – Motion Picture	John Williams	Nominated
Golden Horse Awards	Best Foreign Actor	William Hurt	Won
Moscow International Film Festival	Golden St. George	Lawrence Kasdan	Nominated
New York Film Critics Circle Awards	Best Film		Won
New York Film Critics Circle Awards	Best Director	Lawrence Kasdan	4th Place
New York Film Critics Circle Awards	Best Screenplay	Frank Galati and Lawrence Kasdan	3rd Place
USC Scripter Awards		Frank Galati and Lawrence Kasdan (screenwriters); Anne Tyler (author)	Won
Writers Guild of America Awards	Best Screenplay – Based on Material from Another Medium	Frank Galati and Lawrence Kasdan	Nominated
