= A Patchwork Planet =

1998 novel by Anne Tyler

- First edition
- Author: Anne Tyler
- Language: English
- Publisher: Alfred A. Knopf
- Publication date: 1998 (1st edition)
- Publication place: United States
- Media type: Print (hardcover)
- Pages: 287 p.
- ISBN: 0-375-40256-X
- OCLC: 38522009
- Dewey Decimal: 813/.54 21
- LC Class: PS3570.Y45 P38 1998b

A Patchwork Planet is a novel by Anne Tyler. Published in 1998, it tells the story of Barnaby Gaitlin, an anti-hero and failure who suffers from more than the usual quota of misfortune. The book is noted for its complement of old people and eccentrics and its sharply ironic humor.

== Plot summary ==
The novel is narrated by 30-year-old Barnaby, whose life has gone off the rails since he was caught robbing neighborhood homes as an adolescent. To the despair of his distant father, his social climbing mother, his chilly ex-wife and his prematurely patriarchal brother, Barnaby now works for a company called Rent-a-Back, doing odd jobs for elderly clients.

He also waits, without much hope, for a visitation from the Gaitlin angel, who first suggested to Barnaby's great-grandfather the invention of the wooden dress form that made the Gaitlins rich. He finds his angel but perhaps not where he expects. He believes his angel was 36-year-old Sophia Maynard.

Barnaby first sees Sophia on the train, while he is going to see his 9 year old daughter in Philadelphia, and Sophia is going to visit her mother. While he is in Philadelphia, his ex-wife told him he was not allowed to see their daughter anymore. The next week, he went back. Sophia was on the train again, and he is able to tell her about his job at Rent-a-Back, and she tells him about her job at the bank. They also discuss Opal, Barnaby's daughter, and Sophia agrees he should see her, and that Opal would want to continue to see her daddy.

Later, Sophia contacts Barnaby's employer. She claims her aunt needs help working, and she needs Barnaby to help. Barnaby's friend who is working with him claims that Sophia hangs around while they are working, hoping Barnaby will ask her out. He finally does and she accepts. After a few months, Barnaby introduces Sophia to his family, and later Sophia introduces Barnaby to her mother.

That summer, Barnaby introduces Sophia to his daughter, who has come to visit for a week. Opal says she likes Sophia, but by fall, when Opal sees Sophia's name on her Birthday card, she realizes that they are dating. While Barnaby and Opal are going to eat lunch, they spot Opal's mother. Opal takes her stuffed Hedgehog from her father, and asks her mother to take her home.

The novel traces the lead character's development towards maturity as he is influenced by his family and employers.
