= Noah's Compass =

2009 novel by Anne Tyler

- First edition cover
- Author: Anne Tyler
- Language: English
- Publisher: Alfred A. Knopf
- Publication date: 2009
- Publication place: United States
- Media type: Print (hardcover)
- Pages: 288 pp. (hardcover edition)
- ISBN: 978-0-307-27240-9 (hardcover edition)

Noah's Compass is a novel by Anne Tyler first published in 2009 about a solitary 60-year-old man trying to come to terms with his own life. Critics agree that in this, Tyler's 18th novel, the author again treads familiar territory by setting her novel in Baltimore and by following the life of an inconspicuous man who has never realised his full potential.

== Plot summary ==
On the surface, Liam Pennywell leads an ordered, decent life. Once widowed and once divorced, with three grown-up daughters, he has just been dismissed from his teaching job and, for lack of funds, has moved to a smaller apartment on the outskirts of Baltimore. Toying with the idea of retiring altogether rather than going job hunting at his age, Pennywell is assaulted by a burglar on the very first night he stays at his new place. When he wakes up in hospital with a bandaged head, he cannot remember a thing about the attack.

The loss of memory disturbs him more than the crime itself. In a neurologist's waiting room he observes 38-year-old Eunice accompanying an ageing entrepreneur to his doctor's appointment and finds out that she is working for him as a "rememberer" or, as she herself puts it later, the old man's "external hard drive." Intrigued by this occupation, Pennywell contrives a chance encounter with her, and eventually they strike up a relationship with each other.

Complications in their love affair arise when his youngest daughter, 17-year-old Kitty, decides to move in with him, obviously because she expects to be enjoying more freedom than if she stayed with her mother; and when his middle daughter Louise makes a habit of dumping his four-year-old grandson Jonah at Pennywell's apartment for him to babysit. On top of that, Eunice turns out to be a married woman who, after Pennywell has found out, still does not want to let go of him.

In the end the police arrest the burglar—a juvenile delinquent whose mother has the cheek to ask Pennywell to serve as a character witness at her son's forthcoming trial. By then, Pennywell has made up with his eldest daughter Xanthe, who was bearing an old grudge against her father, has got rid of Eunice, and has got settled in at his new apartment. Also, he has started working as a zayde for Jewish preschool children.

== Title ==
The novel takes its title from a discussion Pennywell has with his grandson about whether Noah was steering his ark, or just bobbing up and down in the flood. "Noah didn't need to figure out directions, because the whole world was underwater and so it made no difference," he tells Jonah. “There wasn't anywhere to go. He was just trying to stay afloat."

== Reviews ==
- William Boot: "Do I Have to Read Noah's Compass?", www.thedailybeast.com (23 January 2010).
- Kathleen Byrne: "Families, They Suck You Up", The Globe and Mail (29 January 2010).
- Elizabeth Day: "Anne Tyler's Noah's Compass, The Observer (16 August 2009).
- Kathryn Harrison: "The Memory Thief", The New York Times (3 January 2010) BR10.
- Yvonne Zipp: "Noah's Compass", The Christian Science Monitor (5 January 2010).
- Links to more reviews at www.reviewsofbooks.com.

== See also ==
- 2009 in literature
