= The Clock Winder =

1972 novel by Anne Tyler

- First edition cover
- Author: Anne Tyler
- Language: English
- Publisher: Knopf
- Publication date: 1972
- Publication place: United States
- Media type: Print (Hardcover and Paperback)
- Pages: 312 pp
- ISBN: 0-394-47898-3
- OCLC: 206830
- Dewey Decimal: 813/.5/4
- LC Class: PZ4.T979 Cl PS3570.Y45 (70178960)

The Clock Winder is a 1972 novel by Anne Tyler.

== Plot summary ==
The protagonist of the story is Elizabeth, a young woman who is taking time away from college to earn a bit of money and discover a sense of direction. By happenstance, she ends up landing in Baltimore near the home of Mrs. Pamela Emerson, a recent widow and the mother of seven grown children. Seeing Mrs. Emerson struggling to store her porch furniture in the garage for the winter, she stops to offer help and ends up becoming Mrs. Emerson's handyman and companion.

The story, which spans 14 years, discusses the relationship between first Elizabeth and Mrs. Emerson and then the relationship between Elizabeth and several of Mrs. Emerson's children, particularly Timothy and Matthew. Elizabeth and the Emersons end up changing each other's lives in fundamental ways.

== Novels’ Place in the Evolution of Tyler’s Writing ==
The Clock Winder could be called Tyler’s “forgotten novel,” as it received little recognition, few reviews, and little financial success when it appeared in 1972. Tyler herself considered this, her fourth novel, to be one she is a bit ashamed of, along with the three that preceded it. However, she also acknowledges that her writing improved considerably with her third and fourth novels, so that her fifth novel, Celestial Navigation, is one that she now considers “her favorite.” In his 2003 Washington Post review, Jonathan Yardley points how The Clock Winder, while flawed, presaged several characteristics of her subsequent novels: For one, it was her first novel set chiefly in Roland Park, Baltimore. More significantly, it is her first in which a major focus is on complex relationships within large idiosyncratic families, and the forces that drive the family members apart, as well as those that continue to pull them back together over time. In 1972, Tyler had just returned to writing after taking off 5 years to raise two girls to school age, an experience that she feels gave her a “richer and deeper…self to speak from.” At one point in the novel, it seems we hear Tyler herself speaking through the main character Elizabeth: “For every grownup you see, you know there must have been at least one person who had the patience to lug them around, and feed them, and walk them nights and keep them out of danger for years and years without a break...Isn’t that surprising? People you wouldn’t trust your purse with for five minutes, maybe, but still they put in years and years of time tending their children along.” Tyler, in her subsequent 15 novels, has continued to focus on the ties that push apart and pull together family members, though her definition of “family” includes any group of people that live closely together.

== Reviews ==
Jonathan Yardley acknowledges The Clock Winder’s flaws: “Its shape is a little loose, some of the secondary characters never quite come into focus, and one wants to know a bit more about the husband whose death sets all these events in motion than is doled out in one long paragraph.” As a novelist who prides herself on developing characters in depth, Tyler later criticized herself for the number of “shallow” characters in this and other earlier novels. Still the novel develops thoroughly “two splendid characters in Mrs. Emerson and Elizabeth Abbott.” Yardley also notes that The Clock Winder contains “page after page of utterly convincing dialogue, quiet humor and keen observation.”

== See also ==
- Clockwork universe theory
