= Celestial Navigation (novel) =

1974 novel by Anne Tyler

- First edition cover
- Author: Anne Tyler
- Language: English
- Publisher: Knopf
- Publication date: 1974
- Publication place: United States
- English publication date: February 1974
- Media type: Print (hardback & paperback)
- Pages: 276
- ISBN: 0701120940
- OCLC: 737160
- Dewey Decimal: 813/.5/4
- LC Class: PZ4.T979 Ce3 PS3570.Y45 (76361214)

Celestial Navigation is a 1974 novel by Anne Tyler. This was her 5th novel.

== Plot summary ==
This story is set in the 1960s in a Baltimore rowhouse/boarding house, owned by Mrs. Pauling, the mother of an artistic 38-year-old man, Jeremy Pauling, who never left home. Jeremy is painfully shy, and has many symptoms of agoraphobia and of autism. The story begins with the death of Jeremy's mother and the funeral arrangements that needed to be handled by his two out-of-town sisters, Amanda and Laura. Amanda is unsympathetic to her brother's inability to come out of his shell, and attempts to persuade him to leave the boarding house and live with her and her sister in Richmond. Jeremy refuses and remains in the house. We meet many of the boarders who form a family of sorts and assist Jeremy in running the boarding house. But a new boarder, Mary Tell and her preschool daughter, Darcy, begin to inspire Jeremy in a new way. Mary has left her husband to live with a new lover, John, who has promised to divorce his wife and marry her. While John is supposedly arranging his divorce, he places Mary and Darcy in Jeremy's boarding house. When John returns to his wife, Mary and Darcy are left rather crushed and somewhat destitute, with no options but to remain in their boarding house room. Mary becomes anxious about her financial situation and the difficulty of raising Darcy under these conditions, but Jeremy and the other boarders help and support her in various ways. In the meantime, Jeremy has fallen in love with Mary, but is totally lost as to how to pursue his love.

== Title of the Novel ==
The boarder Miss Vinton: [Jeremy] "sees from a distance at all times, without trying, even trying not to. It is his condition. He lives at a distance. He makes pictures the way other men make maps--setting down the few fixed points that he knows, hoping they will guide him as he goes floating through this unfamiliar planet....Am I the only one who sees this? Surely Brian [Jeremy's art agent] never has. Brian...went on to talk about a boat he had bought....'In the spring I'm going to try a real trip on her,' he said....'I'll sail by celestial navigation.' Jeremy listened with his eyes wide, his expression awed and admiring....Oh, Jeremy, I wanted to tell him, you too sail by celestial navigation and it is far more celestial than Brian's."

== Author's perspective ==
Anne Tyler commented in a 1992 interview with Patricia Willrich that Celestial Navigation was far more difficult to write than her previous four novels, because she had finally learned to delve deeper into her characters and to rework her drafts multiple times. It is also one of her favorites. She says, “Creating Jeremy was a way of investigating my own tendency to turn more and more inward [as I write.]”

== Reviews ==
- Gail Godwin: "Celestial Navigation" The New York Times (April 28, 1974). Ms. Godwin writes in 1974, "It is a tribute to the author's gentle genius in preserving the integrity of her people that we do not hate Mary Tell. And she succeeds in convincing us that Jeremy Pauling's first and final act of heroism--taking a bus across Baltimore to visit Mary and his children--is more valiant and terrifying for him than blasting off to Venus would be for an astronaut."

== See also ==
- Celestial Navigation
- Shyness
- Agoraphobia
- Autism
- Asperger syndrome
