= The Accidental Tourist =

1985 novel by Anne Tyler

- First edition cover
- Author: Anne Tyler
- Cover artist: Fred Marcellino
- Language: English
- Publisher: Knopf
- Publication date: August 12, 1985
- Publication place: United States
- Media type: Print (hardback & paperback)
- Pages: 355
- ISBN: 9780345452009
- OCLC: 12432313
- Dewey Decimal: 813/.54 19
- LC Class: PS3570.Y45 A64 1985

The Accidental Tourist is a 1985 novel by Anne Tyler that was a finalist for the Pulitzer Prize and won the National Book Critics Circle Award for Fiction in 1985 and the Ambassador Book Award for Fiction in 1986. The novel was adapted into a 1988 film starring William Hurt, Kathleen Turner, and Geena Davis, for which Davis won an Academy Award.

== Plot summary ==
Set in Baltimore, Maryland, the plot revolves around Macon Leary, a writer of travel guides whose son has been killed in a shooting at a fast-food restaurant. He and his wife, Sarah, separately lost in grief, find their marriage disintegrating until she eventually moves out. When he becomes incapacitated due to a fall involving his disturbed dog and one of his crazy inventions, Macon returns to the family home to stay with his eccentric siblings, sister Rose and brothers Porter and Charles, whose odd habits include alphabetizing the groceries in the kitchen cabinets and ignoring the ringing telephone. When Macon's publisher, Julian, comes to visit, he finds himself attracted to Rose. They eventually marry, though Rose later moves back in with her brothers, followed months later by Julian, who becomes part of the family.

Macon hires Muriel Pritchett, an unusual woman in her own right, to train his unruly dog, and soon finds himself drifting into a relationship with her and her sickly son, Alexander. In stark contrast to Sarah, Muriel is brash, garrulous, unsophisticated, and fond of garish outfits; and in stark contrast to the relatively passive Macon, she is strong and assertive. Despite his resistance to a new commitment, Macon finds himself drawn towards Muriel, surprised by her perceptiveness, strength and optimism, and ability to listen. Increasingly attached to both Muriel and Alexander, he moves into their little house in a seedy part of town. Macon finds that he loves "the surprise of her, and also the surprise of himself when he was with her. In the foreign country that was Singleton Street he was an entirely different person." When Sarah learns of these developments, she decides she and Macon should reconcile, forcing him to come to a decision about their future.

== Reception ==
In The New York Times, Larry McMurtry says, "Tyler shows, with a fine clarity, the mingling of misery and contentment in the daily lives of her families, reminds us how alike—and yet distinct—happy and unhappy families can be. Muriel Pritchett is as appealing a woman as Miss Tyler has created; and upon the quiet Macon she lavishes the kind of intelligent consideration that he only intermittently gets from his own womenfolk".

Michiko Kakutani wrote, "It is from just such private lives that Miss Tyler herself has spun her own minutely detailed art, rendering them with such warmth and fidelity that her readers, too, are startled into a new appreciation of the ordinary and mundane. Like John Updike, she has taken as her fictional territory that sprawling American landscape of the middle class, and in 10 novels now, she has claimed as her special province the family in all its contrary dimensions."

In contrast to most critics, John Blades, in the Chicago Tribune, wrote a scathing review: "In an age of dissonant, aggressive fiction, Tyler has established herself as a voice of sweet reason, the heiress apparent to Eudora Welty as the earth mother of American writers. For all Tyler's seductive qualities—the great charm and coziness of her fictional universe, her compassion for misfits, and, not least, her soothing, almost tranquilizing voice—there is something annoyingly synthetic about the work itself. However wise and wonderful, her fiction is seriously diluted by the promiscuous use of artificial sweeteners, a practice that has made Tyler our foremost NutraSweet novelist."

Edward Hoagland wrote in the New York Times, "Macon Leary, the magnificently decent yet ordinary man in The Accidental Tourist, follows logic to its zany conclusions, and in doing this justifies...the catch-as-catch-can nature of much of life, making us realize that we are probably missing people of mild temperament in our own acquaintance who are heroes, too, if we had Ms. Tyler's eye for recognizing them....Muriel, the man-chaser and man-saver of The Accidental Tourist, ranks among the more endearing characters of postwar literature."
