= Seemed Like a Good Idea at the Time =

Seemed Like a Good Idea at the Time may refer to:

- Seemed Like a Good Idea at the Time (album), a compilation album by Al Stewart
- "Seemed Like a Good Idea at the Time" (song), a 2005 song by The Darkness
- Seemed Like a Good Idea at the Time (book)
