= Paul Buckmaster =

British cellist and composer (1946–2017)

Background information
- Born: Paul John Buckmaster; 13 June 1946; London, England
- Died: 7 November 2017 (aged 71) Los Angeles, California, U.S.
- Genres: Classical; rock; pop; country; film score
- Occupations: Musician, composer, arranger, film composer, conductor
- Instruments: Cello, synthesizer
- Website: www.buckmastersound.com

Paul John Buckmaster (13 June 1946 – 7 November 2017) was a British cellist, arranger, conductor and composer, with a career spanning five decades.

He is best known for his orchestral collaborations with David Bowie, Shawn Phillips, Elton John, Harry Nilsson, The Rolling Stones, Carly Simon, Leonard Cohen, Miles Davis, Mott the Hoople, and the Grateful Dead in the 1970s, followed by his contributions to the recordings of many other artists, including Stevie Nicks, Lionel Richie, Celine Dion, Carrie Underwood, Kenny Rogers, Guns N' Roses, Lloyd Cole, Taylor Swift, Something Corporate, Train, Ben Folds, and Heart.

== Early life ==
Paul Buckmaster was born in London on 13 June 1946. His father, John Caravoglia Buckmaster, was an English actor (Note: John Caravoglia Buckmaster (1914–1995) should not be confused with English actor John Rodney Buckmaster (1915–1983), the son of Gladys Cooper. John C. Buckmaster—son of actor-manager Charles Buckmaster, of Italian ancestry—started out as a young actor in the 1930s. During WWII, he enlisted in the London Scottish regiment, where he served with Bruce Copp, also an English actor. John C. Buckmaster saw action in North Africa, then north into Sicily and finally in and around Naples, during late 1943 and early 1944. There he met a young concert pianist, Ermenegilda ("Gilda") Maltese (1918–1989), during a production of Madama Butterfly at the newly restored San Carlo Opera House. They married on 15 August 1945 and, after the war, made their home in Earl's Court, London. They had three children: Paul, Rosemary, and Adrian. John C. Buckmaster continued to have small acting jobs until 1989. In 1994, he moved to Sydney where he died on 9 March 1995.) and his mother, Ermenegilda ("Gilda") Maltese, was an Italian concert pianist and graduate of the Naples Conservatory of Music.

At age four, Buckmaster started attending a small private school in London called the London Violoncello School, and continued studying cello under several private teachers until he was ten. In 1957, his mother took him and his two siblings to Naples, where he auditioned with cello professor Willy La Volpe, to be assessed as eligible for a scholarship. From 1958 to 1962 he divided his time between studying music in Naples and working for his GCEs in London, then won a scholarship to study the cello at the Royal Academy of Music, from which he graduated with a performance diploma in 1967.

== Career ==
=== Studio work ===
Buckmaster displayed professional mastery as a cellist. After leading a small orchestral group during a two-month tour with the Bee Gees in 1968, he started his career as an orchestral arranger on various hit songs, including David Bowie's "Space Oddity" (1969), and contributed orchestral collaborations on a number of early albums by Elton John (1969–72), as well as on the songs "Sway" and "Moonlight Mile" on The Rolling Stones' album Sticky Fingers (1971). Buckmaster contributed string and horn arrangements to Leonard Cohen's 1971 album, Songs of Love and Hate.

He assisted Miles Davis with the preparation of On the Corner (1972) and wrote the arrangements for the studio sessions, in which he also participated, at Davis' request, by humming bass lines and rhythms to lead the musicians. These arrangements were often used as a starting point to be transformed until what was being played bore no resemblance to what he had written. This was in keeping with the Stockhausian approach that Buckmaster and Davis had discussed in the weeks leading up to the session.

=== Film work ===
As a member of Third Ear Band, Buckmaster co-wrote and performed on Music from Macbeth, the soundtrack album to Roman Polanski's film Macbeth (1972). Buckmaster wrote some instrumental tracks for Harry Nilsson's film Son of Dracula (1974). He also played with Bowie and his band in unused recordings for the science fiction film The Man Who Fell to Earth (1976), in which Bowie starred as Thomas Jerome Newton. Buckmaster stated in Mojo magazine's feature "60 Years of Bowie", that he had played cello on the original soundtrack recordings, on which Carlos Alomar, J. Peter Robinson and others were also included:

There were a couple of medium tempo rock instrumental pieces, with simple motifs and rifly kind of grooves, with a line-up of David's rhythm section (Carlos Alomar et al.) plus J. Peter Robinson on Fender Rhodes and me on cello and some synth overdubs, using ARP Odyssey and Solina. There was also a piece I wrote and performed using some beautifully made mbiras (African thumb pianos) I had purchased earlier that year, plus cello, all done by multiple overdubbing.

— Paul Buckmaster, "60 Years of Bowie" (Mojo Classic Magazine - Vol 2 Issue 2)

Later, the film's director Nicolas Roeg decided not to use the recordings but rather existing songs as the soundtrack for the movie.

In 1995 Buckmaster composed, orchestrated, conducted and produced the original score to Terry Gilliam's 12 Monkeys. He also composed the score for the 1997 film Most Wanted.

== Personal life ==
Buckmaster had two siblings, a sister and a brother. He married Diana Lewis in 1970; they divorced three years later. From a relationship with Rosalie Van Leer, he had a son. Buckmaster died in Los Angeles on 7 November 2017, aged 71, from undisclosed causes.

== Awards ==
Buckmaster won the 2002 Grammy Award for Best Instrumental Arrangement Accompanying Vocalist(s) for his work on American rock band Train's 2001 single "Drops of Jupiter".

== Selected discography ==
Year	Artist	Song	Album	Notes
2018	Brandi Carlile	"Whatever You Do" "Party of One"	By the Way, I Forgive You	Arranger, conductor
2017	Chris Cornell	"The Promise"	Chris Cornell (2018)	Arranger, conductor
2016	Kelly Clarkson	"I Don't Think About You"	Meaning of Life	Arranger, conductor
2016	Max&Friends	"Dove c'è amore"; "Arrivi Tu"; "Acqua"; "Sabato Sera"; "Una parte del tutto"; "Felice"; "Terra mia"	Max&Friends	Co-composer, arranger, conductor
2016	Idina Menzel	"Extraordinary"; "Show Me"; "Everybody Knows"; "Small World"; "I Do"; "I See You"; "Like Lightning"; "Last Time"	idina.	Arranger
2016	Heart	"I Jump"; "City's Burning"; "Sweet Darlin"; "Language of Love"	Beautiful Broken	Arranger
2015	The Tenors	"I Remember You"	Under One Sky	Arranger
2014	Hunter Hayes	"...interlude"	Storyline	Arranger, conductor
2014	Ferras feat. Katy Perry	"Legends Never Die"	Ferras	Arranger, conductor
2013	Goo Goo Dolls	"When The World Breaks Your Heart"	Magnetic	Arranger, conductor
2012	Ben Folds Five	"On Being Frank"; "Away When You Were Here"	The Sound of the Life of the Mind	Arranger, conductor
2010	Taylor Swift	"Back to December"; "Haunted"	Speak Now	Arranger, conductor
2009	Mika	"I See You"	The Boy Who Knew Too Much	Arranger, conductor
2008	Guns N' Roses	"Street of Dreams"; "There Was A Time"; "Madagascar"; "Prostitute"	Chinese Democracy	Arranger, conductor
2007	The Bravery	"The Ocean"	The Sun and the Moon	Arranger, conductor
2007	Mika	"Happy Ending"	Life in Cartoon Motion	Arranger, conductor
2007	Katharine McPhee	"Ordinary World"	Katharine McPhee	Arranger, conductor
2007	Michael Bublé	"Lost"	Call Me Irresponsible	Arranger, conductor
2007	Mig Ayesa	"Baby I Love Your Way"; "Kiss From a Rose"; "Who Wants to Live Forever"; "Can't Find My Home"; "Life on Mars"; "Wrapped Around Your Finger"	Mig	Arranger, conductor
2006	Ben Folds	"Still (Reprise)"	Over the Hedge (Soundtrack)	Arranger, conductor
2006	New Found Glory	"When I Die"; "Boulders"	Coming Home	Arranger, conductor
2006	Kenny Rogers	"Water & Bridges"; "One Life"	Water & Bridges	Arranger, conductor
2006	Jesse McCartney	"Invincible"	Right Where You Want Me	Arranger, conductor
2006	Skillet	"Rebirthing"; "Yours to Hold"	Comatose	Arranger, conductor
2006	Bianca Ryan	"Awake"	Bianca Ryan	Arranger, conductor
2005	Bon Jovi	"Wildflower"	Have a Nice Day	Arranger, conductor
2005	Carrie Underwood	"Lessons Learned"; "Starts With Goodbye"	Some Hearts	Arranger, conductor
2005	Faith Hill	"Paris"	Fireflies	Arranger, conductor
2005	Ben Folds	"Landed"	Songs for Silverman	Arranger, conductor
2005	The Wallflowers	"Beautiful Side of Somewhere"	Rebel, Sweetheart	Arranger, conductor
2005	The Darkness	"Seemed Like a Good Idea at the Time"; "Girlfriend"; "Blind Man"	One Way Ticket to Hell... and Back	Arranger, conductor
2005	Nerina Pallot	"Geek Love"; "Idaho"	Fires	Arranger, conductor
2004	Keith Urban	"Tonight I Wanna Cry"; "She's Gotta Be"	Be Here	Arranger, conductor
2004	Tears for Fears	"Secret World"	Everybody Loves a Happy Ending	Arranger, conductor
2004	Third Day	"Wire"; "It's a Shame"	Wire	Arranger, conductor
2003	Train	"Lincoln Avenue"; "Your Every Color"	My Private Nation	Arranger, conductor
2003	The Thorns	"No Blue Sky"	The Thorns	Arranger, conductor
2003	Something Corporate	"The Runaway"; "Me and the Moon"	North	Arranger, conductor, performer
2003	Beth Hart	"I'll Stay With You"	Leave the Light On	Arranger, conductor
2003	Luis Miguel	"Nos Hizo Falta Tiempo"	33	Arranger, conductor
2003	Live	"Run Away"	Birds of Pray	Arranger, conductor
2003	Wilshire	"In Your Arms"; "Tonight"	New Universe	Arranger, conductor
2002	Faith Hill	"You're Still Here"; "Safest Place to Hide"	Cry	Arranger, conductor
2002	Tim McGraw	"She's My Kind of Rain"	Tim McGraw and the Dancehall Doctors	Arranger, conductor
2002	Something Corporate	"Punk Rock Princess"; "The Astronaut"; "Cavanaugh Park"; "Not What It Seems"; "Globes And Maps"	Leaving Through the Window	Arranger, conductor
2001	Train	"Drops of Jupiter"	Drops of Jupiter	Arranger, conductor 2002 Grammy Winner; Arrangement of the Year
2001	Elton John	"This Train Don't Stop There Anymore"; "Original Sin"; "Ballad of the Boy in the Red Shoes"; "Mansfield"; "Emperor's New Clothes"	Songs from the West Coast	Arranger, conductor
2000	No Doubt	"Too Late (Reprise)" (Hidden instrumental track)	Return of Saturn	Arranger, conductor
1999	Julio Iglesias Jr.		Under My Eyes	Arranger, conductor
1999	Tal Bachman	"Beside You"; "You're My Everything"	Tal Bachman	Arranger, conductor
1999	Lara Fabian	"Sola Otra Vez"	Lara Fabian	Arranger
1998	Des'ree	"Time"	Supernatural	Arranger, conductor
1997	Collective Soul	"She Said"	Scream 2 Soundtrack	Arranger, conductor, co-composer
1996	Counting Crows	"Daylight Fading"; "I'm Not Sleeping"; "Another Horsedreamer's Blues"	Recovering the Satellites	Arranger, conductor
1996	Celine Dion	"Falling into You"	Falling into You	Arranger, conductor
1995	Elton John	"Believe"; "Belfast"; "House"; "Cold"	Made in England	Composer, arranger, conductor
1995	The Jayhawks	"Blue"	Tomorrow the Green Grass	Arranger
1993	Dwight Yoakam	"Ain't That Lonely Yet"; "Try Not to Look So Pretty"	This Time	Arranger, conductor
1992	Lionel Richie	"My Destiny"; "Love, Oh Love"	Back to Front	Arranger, conductor
1991	Kenny Loggins	"Cody's Song"; "Too Early for the Sun"	Leap of Faith	Arranger, conductor
1991	Lloyd Cole		Don't Get Weird on Me Babe	Arranger, conductor
1985	Mick Jagger	"Hard Woman"	She's the Boss	Arranger, conductor
1983	Nick Heyward		North of a Miracle	Arranger
1983	Stevie Nicks	"Beauty and the Beast"	The Wild Heart	Arranger, conductor
1981	UFO	"Profession of Violence"	The Wild, the Willing and the Innocent	Arranger, conductor
1978	Elton John		A Single Man	Arranger, conductor
1977	Grateful Dead		Terrapin Station	Arranger, conductor (side two)
1976	Elton John		Blue Moves	Arranger, conductor
1976	Leo Sayer	"I Hear the Laughter" "Endless Flight"	Endless Flight	Arranger, conductor; cello
1975	Thijs van Leer		O My Love	Arranger, conductor
1974	Miles Davis	"Ife"	Big Fun	Arranger, conductor
1974	Carly Simon	"Haven't Got Time for the Pain"	Hotcakes	Arranger, conductor
1974	Angelo Branduardi		Angelo Branduardi	Arranger, conductor, producer, co-composer
1973	Chi Coltrane		Let It Ride	Arranger of strings and woodwinds
1973	Elton John	"Have Mercy on the Criminal"; "Blues for My Baby and Me"	Don't Shoot Me I'm Only the Piano Player	Arranger, conductor
1973	Shawn Phillips	"Lady of the Blue Rose"	Bright White	Arranger, conductor
1973	Blood, Sweat & Tears		No Sweat	Arranger, conductor
1972	Chi Coltrane		Chi Coltrane	Arranger of strings and woodwinds
1972	Miles Davis		On the Corner	Arranger, conductor, electric cello
1972	Carly Simon	"You're So Vain"	No Secrets	Arranger, conductor
1972	Harry Nilsson	"Spaceman"	Son of Schmilsson	Arranger, conductor
1971	Elton John	"Tiny Dancer"; "Levon"; "Madman Across the Water"; "Indian Sunset"	Madman Across the Water	Arranger, conductor, musical director
1971	Rolling Stones	"Moonlight Mile"; "Sway"	Sticky Fingers	Arranger, conductor
1971	Chitinous Ensemble		Chitinous Ensemble	Musical director, electric piano, cello
1971	Leonard Cohen		Songs of Love and Hate	Arranger, conductor
1971	Harry Nilsson	"Without You"	Nilsson Schmilsson	Arranger, conductor
1971	Elton John	"Variations on "Friends" Theme"; "Variations on Michelle's Song"; "I Mean To Do My Work Today"; "Four Moods"	Friends	Arranger, conductor, musical director
1971	Rupert Hine		Pick Up a Bone	Arranger, electric cello
1971	Sounds Nice		Love at First Sight	Arranger
1970	Elton John		Tumbleweed Connection	Arranger, conductor, musical director
1970	Elton John	"Your Song"; "Border Song"; "The Greatest Discovery" (cello Intro); "Sixty Years On"	Elton John	Arranger, conductor, musical director
1970	Shawn Phillips	"F Sharp Splendor" (instrumental)	Second Contribution	Arranger, musical director, keyboards
1970	Mick Farren	"Mona, The Whole Trip"	Mona – The Carnivorous Circus	Solo cello
1970	Arrival	"Friends"; "I Will Survive"		Arranger, cello
1970	Michael Chapman	"Aviator"	Fully Qualified Survivor	Solo cello
1969	Kevin Ayers		Joy of a Toy	Solo cello
1969	David Bowie	"Space Oddity"; "Wild Eyed Boy from Freecloud"	Space Oddity	Arranger, conductor, cello
1969	The Bee Gees	"Odessa (City on the Black Sea)"	Odessa	Cello
