= Leaving Through the Window =

Studio album by Something Corporate
- Released: May 21, 2002
- Recorded: January–March 2002
- Studio: Various: Cello (Hollywood, California); 4th Street Recording (Santa Monica, California); South Beach (Miami Beach, Florida); Jungle Room (Glendale, California)
- Genre: Alternative rock; pop-punk; power pop
- Length: 57:35
- Label: Drive-Thru, MCA
- Producer: Jim Wirt

Something Corporate chronology
Audioboxer (2001)	Leaving Through the Window (2002)	North (2003)

Singles from Leaving Through the Window
- 1. "I Woke Up in a Car" Released: September 27, 2002; 2. "Punk Rock Princess" Released: March 17, 2003; 3. "If You C Jordan" Released: March 31, 2003

Leaving Through the Window is the second studio album and major-label debut by American rock band Something Corporate. Following the success of the Drive-Thru Records-released Audioboxer (2001) EP, the band signed to their label distributor MCA Records in late 2001 after the EP caught their attention. The three-month recording process for Leaving Through the Window took place in studios across California and Florida, with Jim Wirt acting as producer. A few songs from previous releases were re-recorded for inclusion on the album; the material was anywhere from three months to three years old. A music video was made for "If You C Jordan" in early 2002; the group then embarked on a three-month long US tour.

After the tour, Leaving Through the Window was released jointly by Drive-Thru and MCA Records on May 21. The band performed on the Warped Tour in 2002 and supported New Found Glory once on a European trek and again on a US tour through to the end of the year. A DVD single that featured music videos for "I Woke Up in a Car" and "If You C Jordan" was released during the US leg. They co-headlined a three-month US tour with the Juliana Theory, which coincided with the release of a music video for "Punk Rock Princess". It was released as a UK single in early March and was promoted with a tour there; at the end of the month, "If You C Jordan" was released as a single.

Leaving Through the Window sold 12,000 copies in its first week, charting at number 101 on the Billboard 200 chart in the process. It appeared on another Billboard chart, Heatseekers Albums, where it reached number one. "Punk Rock Princess" and "If You C Jordan" had some success: "If You C Jordan" charted at number 29 on Billboard's Alternative Songs chart and number 68 in the UK; "Punk Rock Princess" charted only in the UK at number 33. As of mid-2005, the album's sales stood at 291,000 copies. The record received a mixed reception from critics, with negative comments on its length and frontman Andrew McMahon's vocals, and positive comments about his musicianship.

== Background ==
Something Corporate's debut album Ready... Break was released through a local concert venue in November 2000. Before vocalist/pianist Andrew McMahon's final year of high school, guitarists Josh Partington and Reuben Hernandez left for college. Eventually, the two flew back to play gigs. The group met to discuss their commitment to the band; a portion of their day-job wages was being used to help fund the group. Hernandez left the group to continue his studies and was replaced by William Tell. After finalizing their line-up, the group began performing at local venues, eventually gaining support slots for bands like Better Than Ezra and Sugar Ray. Shortly afterwards, a number of record labels showed an interest in signing the group. House of Blues representative Sean Striegel suggested to independent label Drive-Thru Records that they check out the band while they were in the process of recording the Audioboxer EP in June 2001.

Representatives from the label, who saw the group's crossover potential, visited McMahon's home for a performance in his garage. They stayed for over an hour and a half as the group performed a full set, compared to the 20-minute sets that other labels wanted them to play. The following month, the band signed to Drive-Thru Records, partially because the label liked their ballads. Drive-Thru wanted a minor release to introduce the band, leading to the release of Audioboxer in October. KROQ came across the EP and began playing the track "If You C Jordan" later that month. The EP soon caught the attention of major label MCA Records, which had a distribution deal with Drive-Thru that allowed MCA to upstream bands from them. In November and December, the group toured across the US with the likes of Reel Big Fish, Sugarcult and River City High.

== Production ==
Pre-production began for Leaving Through the Window on Boxing Day 2001 and wrapped up in early January 2002. Main recording took place between January and March at various studios across the US: Cello Studios in Hollywood, California; 4th Street Recording in Santa Monica, California; South Beach Studios in Miami Beach, Florida; and Jungle Room Studios in Glendale, California. Jim Wirt produced and engineered all the sessions, with additional engineering by Mike Fraser. "Globes & Maps" was engineered by Brian Reeves. PJ Smith, Alan Sanderson and Joel Ausbrooks served as additional engineers. CJ Eiriksson and Patrick Shevelin acted as Pro-Tools engineers. Smith provided background vocals on "Punk Rock Princess", "I Woke Up in a Car", "The Astronaut", "Hurricane", "Straw Dog", "Drunk Girl" and "Not What It Seems".

Strings were engineered by Steve Churchyard with assistance from Robert Read. Session musician Patrick Warren contributed chamberlin and organ to "Globes & Maps". "Punk Rock Princess" and "Hurricane", both of which featured on the Audioboxer EP, were re-recorded for the album as the group wanted to be "happier with their execution", according to McMahon. Three tracks—"Cavanaugh Park", "Straw Dog" and "Drunk Girl"—from Ready... Break were also re-recorded for the album. On two separate occasions, the piano was tracked in half-time to give it a different sound. Mixing was done by Tom Lord-Alge in April, before being mastered by Stephen Marcussen at Marcussen Mastering in Hollywood.

== Composition and lyrics ==
All of the songs on Leaving Through the Window were written by McMahon, with the exception of "Hurricane", "Fall" and "You're Gone" which were written by Josh Partington. McMahon found it easier coming up with arrangements on the piano, rather than a guitar, as it seemed a better instrument to expand song structures. The band spent the time required to get the right sound balance between McMahon's piano, and Partington and Tell's guitars. McMahon reasoned that instruments needed to be at the right place in a song's arrangement so they could be "both felt and heard." "Punk Rock Princess", "Cavanaugh Park", "Straw Dog" and "Globes & Maps" feature string arrangements written by Paul Buckmaster who conducted the 26-piece orchestra that performed them. Partington described the album as a "conglomeration of songs that were anywhere from three months to three years old ... like a greatest hits of our early stuff." Discussing the album's title, McMahon said they wanted a name that was connected to some of the tracks, namely, to two lines in "I Want to Save You". He added that they lines "kind of reference the kind of getting in and out without being detected so that's how we came out with that".

Musically, the album has been classified as alternative rock, pop punk and power pop. It has been compared to works by bands like Jimmy Eat World, Cheap Trick, Lit, and New Found Glory. Austin Saalman of Under the Radar wrote that the album was a "a warm concoction of guitar-heavy pop-punk and emotive piano rock, charmingly complemented by [...] McMahon’s naive boy-next-door lyrical sensitivity". "I Want to Save You" is a character sketch of a girl who was mistreated by her partner. Discussing "Punk Rock Princess", McMahon said he was interested in a girl who liked punk rock music while he was in high school. The song served as a metaphor for what was a frequent discrepancy between the pair, which McMahon described: "She was cooler than I was and she liked punk and I was this, like, squirrely kid in, like, a piano band." The song had initially began as a ballad.

"I Woke Up in a Car" was written after the first Something Corporate tour. A day or two after it ended, McMahon sat in his parents' garage, where his piano was situated and wrote the song around his memories of the tour. They almost named it "I Woke Up in a Van", but felt that it did not fit as well as car did. The song references a show the band played in Poughkeepsie, New York at The Chance venue, as well as to Rockford, Illinois. "If You C Jordan" was written during McMahon's last year in high school, after a guy named Jordan wanted to fight with him over a girl. It is about being bullied and using words to fight back. The track was not initially planned for release on the album and was meant to appear solely on the Audioboxer EP. "If You C Jordan" and "If I Were a Terrorist, I'd Bomb the Graduation" were written during the same period in 6/8 time. The band wanted both tracks to on the EP as an introduction to their music. However, "Terrorist" was left off the release because of the September 11 attacks; the group thought it would be in bad taste to use it. They had been playing the track live for up to six months before the event occurred.

"The Astronaut" was written in the midst of the album's recording sessions while Tom Petty was working in the next room. It lyrics reference space travel, which would continue to be an occasional theme in McMahon's songwriting. "Hurricane" is credited to Partington, with McMahon contributing three words. When Partington played the track for the band at practice, McMahon was enthusiastic about it. Sean Richardson of The Boston Phoenix said Partington's lyrical form was "more introspective and harder-hitting than McMahon’s". McMahon wrote "Cavanaugh Park" while he was 16 or 17; it was named after a recreational area in Lake Forest, California. The park serves as a benchmark for incidents while growing up, like hanging out with friends and getting into trouble. The pop punk track "Fall" is followed by two indie pop songs, "Straw Dog" and "Good News"; the latter two, plus closer "Globes & Maps", showcased a sound that McMahon would later explore with his solo project Jack's Mannequin a few years later.

== Release ==
While recording was nearly completed, "If You C Jordan" was gaining traction at popular alternative radio stations. In early February 2002, a music video was filmed for the track at El Segundo High School. It was directed by Richard Reines, who co-founded Drive-Thru Records and filmed over two 14-hour days. It opens with Chris Owen, who acts as Jordan the bully showing up to high school in a Porsche. The band takes musical equipment from the choir room and starts performing in the hallway. It concludes with them hanging out with Summer Altice. On February 25, the group performed the track on The Late Late Show with Craig Ferguson. On March 15, the album's title Leaving Through the Window was announced; later that day, the group worked on images for the album with photographer Justin Stephens. Between March and May, the group toured across the US. Following this, the group filmed a music video for "I Woke Up in a Car" in Toronto, Canada during an off day in between tours. Leaving Through the Window was released on May 21, 2002 as a joint release by Drive-Thru and MCA Records. The UK edition, which was released on September 9, included "Little" and "Walking By" (both from Audioboxer) as bonus tracks. The artwork stars Sara Pohlman, a 15 year-old model from Tennessee.

Between late June and mid-August, the group went on the Warped Tour (2002). Following this, the group toured across Europe supporting New Found Glory in August and September, before headlining two shows in the UK and four in Japan. "I Woke Up in a Car" was released to Hot AC radio on September 27. In October and November, the band toured across the US alongside New Found Glory, Finch and Further Seems Forever. A DVD single was released on November 5, featuring music videos for "I Woke Up in a Car" and "If You C Jordan". Following two European shows, the band went on a co-headlining tour of the US with the Juliana Theory between January and March 2003, supported by Vendetta Red, Red West and Fiction Plane. On January 17, a music video was released for "Punk Rock Princess"; it was filmed the previous December in Toronto, Canada. The track was released as a CD single in the UK on March 17 with "Forget December" and "Konstantine" as the B-sides. The latter track was initially planned for inclusion on the album, but was let off as the band thought it did not fit with album's flow. In March, the group went on a UK tour with Home Grown and Steel Train. On March 31, "If You C Jordan" was released as a single.

== Reception ==
Professional ratings
Review scores
Source	Rating
AllMusic	4/5 stars
Blender	3/5 stars
The Boston Phoenix	2.5/5 stars
Drowned in Sound	1/5 stars
Melodic	3/5 stars
Ox-Fanzine	4/10
Punknews.org	2/5 stars
Rolling Stone	3/5 stars
Sputnikmusic	3/5

=== Critical response ===
Leaving Through the Window received mixed response from music critics. AllMusic reviewer Alex Henderson wrote the group's style was "punky yet vulnerable and introspective", with McMahon "anchoring" many of the songs around his piano. He felt it was "among the more memorable and promising alterna-rock efforts of 2002." CMJ Music Monthly writer Michelle Kleinsak said McMahon's musicianship on the piano disconnects the group from their emo/punk peers, and helps make their album "such an elegant and confident debut." Melodic reviewer Kaj Roth wrote that the "real nice" record was filled with "loads of catchy tunes" that are "perfect for the radio this hot summer." Richard Abowitz of Rolling Stone noted the band crafted "suburban ennui and high school angst into slick, hummable punk." He mentioned that McMahon's song writing was "the secret weapon," calling it "derivative, but not boring." Sputnikmusic emeritus Andrew H. viewed the album as "pretty average", though he found the lyrics/vocals "really personal", adding that some listeners would dislike McMahon's voice. The staff at Modern Fix noted that the keyboard would struggle to compete with the loudness of the guitars and McMahon's vocals, while praising their "excellent grasp on constructing songs that have defined parts and movements, flows and sways".

Punknews.org's Scott Heisel opened his review complaining of the record's length: "This CD is too fucking long", before adding that it was "way too long overall. There are too many songs, and each song seems to enjoy sauntering in at around the 4 minute mark". In spite of this, he said the group seemed "pretty proficient at writing a good pop song" and praised McMahon's vocals. Steve Servos of Chart Attack claimed the band tried "so hard to be punk ... but fall so far short that when they look around they can’t even see where punk went." He criticized the album's length, wishing the band had left "at least a minute from each song on the studio’s floor, where they belong." Ink 19 reviewer Kiran Aditham found McMahon's singing "less annoying" compared to the band's labelmates New Found Glory. He lambasted the release as being "standard fare" which Weezer had done "much better and more creatively almost a decade ago." Drowned in Sound's Peter White dismissed the album as an "XFM playlist without the edge" that "makes a mockery of all things beautiful about the joy of discovery and the fun of breathing."

=== Commercial performance and accolades ===
Leaving Through the Window charted at number 101 on the Billboard 200 chart, selling 12,000 copies in its first week. It also charted at number one on the Heatseekers Albums chart. "Punk Rock Princess" charted at number 33 in the UK. "If You C Jordan" charted at number 29 on the Alternative Songs chart and number 68 in the UK. By June 2005, album sales stood at 291,000 copies.

The album has appeared on best-of pop punk album lists by BuzzFeed, Houston Press and i-D. Additionally, Rock Sound ranked it at number 227 on the list of best albums in their lifetime. Cleveland.com ranked "Punk Rock Princess" at number 52 on their list of the top 100 pop-punk songs. Alternative Press ranked "Punk Rock Princess" at number 92 on their list of the best 100 singles from the 2000s. In his retrospective piece, Saalman wrote that the album, "remains a significant act within its genre’s canon, its songs forming a collective portrait of late-’90s and early-’00s American youth culture".

== Track listing ==
All songs written by Andrew McMahon, except where noted.

No.	Title	Writer(s)	Length
1.	"I Want to Save You"		4:22
2.	"Punk Rock Princess"		3:52
3.	"I Woke Up in a Car"		4:13
4.	"If You C Jordan"		4:15
5.	"The Astronaut"		4:28
6.	"Hurricane"	Josh Partington	3:50
7.	"Cavanaugh Park"		4:18
8.	"Fall"	Partington	3:40
9.	"Straw Dog"		3:49
10.	"Good News"		3:51
11.	"Drunk Girl"		4:07
12.	"Not What It Seems"		3:18
13.	"You're Gone"	Partington	4:37
14.	"Globes & Maps"		4:48
Total length:			57:35

Japan bonus tracks
No.	Title	Length
1.	"Little" (Taken from the EP "Audioboxer")	4:52
2.	"Bad Days" (Taken from the EP "Audioboxer")	3:38

Europe bonus tracks
No.	Title	Length
1.	"Little" (Taken from the EP "Audioboxer")	4:52
2.	"Walking By" (Taken from the EP "Audioboxer")	4:30

10th-anniversary vinyl bonus track
No.	Title	Length
1.	"Konstantine"	9:36

20th-anniversary vinyl bonus tracks
No.	Title	Writer(s)	Length
1.	"Forget December"	Partington
2.	"I Want to Save You (Acoustic)"
3.	"Konstantine"		9:36

== Personnel ==
Personnel from the sleeve of Leaving Through the Window.

Something Corporate

- Andrew McMahon – lead vocals, piano, Hammond
- Brian Ireland – drums, percussion, backing vocals
- Josh Partington – lead guitar, backing vocals
- William Tell – rhythm guitar, backing vocals
- Kevin "Clutch" Page – bass, backing vocals

Additional musicians

- Paul Buckmaster – string arrangements, string conductor
- Suzie Katayama – orchestra manager
- PJ Smith – backing vocals (tracks 2, 3, 5, 6, 9, 11 and 12)
- Patrick Warren – chamberlin, organ (track 14)
- Introspekt – DJ (track 5)

Production

- Jim Wirt – producer, engineer
- Tom Lord-Alge – mixing
- Mike Fraser – additional engineer
- Brian Reeves – engineer (track 14)
- PJ Smith – second engineer
- Alan Sanderson – second engineer
- Joel Ausbrooks – second engineer
- CJ Eiriksson – Pro-Tools engineer
- Patrick Shevelin – Pro-Tools engineer
- Steve Churchyard – string engineer
- Robert Read – assistant engineer
- Stephen Marcussen – mastering
- Tim Stedman – art direction, design
- Justin Stephens – photography
- Nick Murphy – prop stylist
- Sara Pohlman – cover model

== Charts ==
Chart performance
Chart (2002–2003)	Peak position
French Albums (SNEP)	138
UK Rock & Metal Albums (OCC)	38
US Billboard 200	101
US Heatseekers Albums (Billboard)	1
