= Putland =

Putland is a surname. Notable people with the surname include:

- Gary Putland (born 1986), Australian cricketer
- Mary Putland (1783–1864), Lady of Government House, New South Wales, Australia
- Michael Putland (1947–2019), English music photographer
