= You're Breakin' My Heart =

1972 single by Harry Nilsson

Swiss picture sleeve

"You're Breakin' My Heart" is a song by American singer-songwriter Harry Nilsson, appearing on his 1972 album Son of Schmilsson. It is notorious for the opening line, "You're breakin' my heart / You're tearin' it apart / So fuck you".

== Recording ==
The song was written by Nilsson about the then-recent separation from his wife Diane; the lyrics contain self-blame for the break-up, as well as several unpleasant diatribes towards his former partner. Biographer Alyn Shipton speculated that at least one line was a coded reference to Nilsson's relationship with his close friend Ringo Starr.

During recording, Nilsson had begun to drink heavily and started to record more experimental and controversial material; producer Richard Perry urged him to reconsider and try to record something more in the vein of the earlier hit album Nilsson Schmilsson, but was overruled. Nilsson wanted to release the track as a single, but this was clearly impractical, for the profanity in the lyrics would never be broadcast on mainstream radio. RCA Records was apprehensive about even putting the track on the album, but it did eventually make the final pressing. In Britain, the song was also issued as the B-side of the album's first single, "Spaceman".

== Personnel ==
The backing track features George Harrison on slide guitar and a horn section comprising Bobby Keys, Jim Price and Klaus Voormann. The other musicians on the recording are Peter Frampton (on electric guitar), Nicky Hopkins (piano) and Barry Morgan (drums), while Voormann also played bass guitar.

== Legacy ==
The song is listed in the book The 7500 Most Important Songs for the Rock and Roll Era, where it is simply described as "terse and to the point". It was used in the 1983 teenage comedy Private School.

In 1995, former J. Geils Band frontman Peter Wolf covered the song on the tribute album For the Love of Harry: Everybody Sings Nilsson.

In 2021, The Melvins covered the song for their album Working with God, retitling it "1 Fuck You".
