= Played in Space: The Best of Something Corporate =

Greatest hits album by Something Corporate
- Released: April 27, 2010
- Genre: Emo, pop punk
- Length: 84:09
- Label: Geffen
- Producer: Jim Wirt

Something Corporate chronology
Live at the Ventura Theater (2004)	Played in Space: The Best of Something Corporate (2010)

Professional ratings
Review scores
Source	Rating
Allmusic	3/5 stars

Played in Space: The Best of Something Corporate is a compilation album by Something Corporate released April 27, 2010. It is made up of two discs: one, a greatest hits album, and the other with previously unreleased tracks and newly mixed songs. An exclusive iTunes edition contains the bonus track "Letters to Noelle". The title "Played in Space" is a reference to the fact that NASA control on Earth played the song "The Astronaut" as a morning "wake-up call" to space shuttle astronauts in 2006. The compilation debuted at 155 on the Billboard 200.

== Track listing ==
=== Disc One ===
No.	Title	Writer(s)	Length
1.	"Space"	Josh Partington, Something Corporate	2:56
2.	"I Woke Up In A Car"	Andrew McMahon, Something Corporate	4:14
3.	"She Paints Me Blue"	Andrew McMahon, Something Corporate	3:39
4.	"Hurricane"	Josh Partington, Something Corporate	3:53
5.	"Me and the Moon"	Andrew McMahon, Something Corporate	4:11
6.	"Fall"	Josh Partington, Something Corporate	3:44
7.	"Ruthless"	Andrew McMahon, Something Corporate	3:27
8.	"I Want To Save You"	Andrew McMahon, Something Corporate	4:27
9.	"Cavanaugh Park"	Andrew McMahon, Something Corporate	4:25
10.	"If You C Jordan"	Andrew McMahon, Something Corporate	4:18
11.	"Down"	Andrew McMahon, Something Corporate	3:34
12.	"Punk Rock Princess"	Andrew McMahon, Something Corporate	3:53
13.	"Walking By"	Andrew McMahon, Something Corporate	4:30
14.	"The Astronaut"	Andrew McMahon, Something Corporate	4:33
Total length:			55:42

=== Disc Two ===
No.	Title	Writer(s)	Length
1.	"Konstantine"	Andrew McMahon, Something Corporate	9:37
2.	"Watch The Sky (Previously Unreleased)"	Andrew McMahon, Something Corporate	2:56
3.	"Forget December (New Exclusive Mix)"	Josh Partington, Something Corporate	3:12
4.	"I Woke Up In A Car (Adam Young Mix)"	Andrew McMahon, Something Corporate	4:08
5.	"Letters To Noelle (iTunes Store Exclusive)"	Andrew McMahon, Something Corporate	4:22
6.	"Wait (New Recording)"	Josh Partington, Something Corporate	4:15
Total length:			28:27

Year	Chart	Position
2010	Billboard 200	155
