= North (Something Corporate album) =

Studio album by Something Corporate
- Released: October 21, 2003
- Recorded: May–June 2003
- Studios: Robert Lang and TMF, Seattle, Washington; 4th Street Recording, Santa Monica, California
- Genres: Pop punk; power pop
- Length: 41:31
- Labels: Geffen, Drive-Thru
- Producer: Jim Wirt

Something Corporate chronology
Leaving Through the Window (2002)	North (2003)	Live at the Ventura Theater (2004)

Singles from North
- 1. "Space" Released: September 8, 2003; 2. "Ruthless" Released: March 15, 2004

North is the third and final studio album by American rock band Something Corporate. Near the beginning of the writing process for the album, vocalist and pianist Andrew McMahon and guitarist Josh Partington wanted it to "sound like a winter album", in contrast to their second album Leaving Through the Window (2002) which they viewed as a "summer album". After losing focus through constant touring, the group decided to record an album in Seattle, Washington. Recording took place at Robert Lang Studios in Seattle with producer Jim Wirt in May 2003. After relocating to Los Angeles, California, further tracking was done at 4th Street Recording in Santa Monica.

Following North's announcement in July 2003, the band went on tour supporting 311 and Good Charlotte. Preceded by the single "Space" in September, the album was released on October 21 through Geffen and Drive-Thru Records. The band subsequently went on a headlining United States tour from October to December. In February 2004, guitarist William Tell left the band and was replaced by Bobby Anderson of the band River City High. Preceded by second single "Ruthless", the group co-headlined a US tour with Yellowcard in March and April.

North received a positive response from music critics, several reviewers noted the band's musical growth since their second album. The album charted number 24 on the Billboard 200 chart, as well as number 152 in the United Kingdom. "Space" peaked at number 37 on the Billboard Alternative Songs chart. North sold 41,000 copies in the first week and would go on to sell 339,000 copies by June 2005. The album was released on vinyl for the first time in November 2013 to celebrate its tenth anniversary.

== Background and writing ==
After finalizing their lineup, Something Corporate began performing at local venues, eventually gaining support slots for groups such as Better Than Ezra and Sugar Ray. Shortly afterwards, the band signed to independent label Drive-Thru Records. Drive-Thru had a distribution deal with major label MCA Records, which allowed the latter to upstream bands from the former. The band's second album Leaving Through the Window, released in early 2002, was a joint release between both record labels. While on tour, vocalist and pianist Andrew McMahon began writing material for their next album. Early in the writing process, McMahon and guitarist Josh Partington had discussions on what they wanted the album to sound like. They decided they wanted it to "sound like a winter album", in contrast to Leaving Through the Window which they felt sounded like a "summer album".

Partington elaborated: "We really wanted it to feel, not sad and somber really but just kind of have a broody feeling." McMahon and Partington wrote songs separately. The pair wanted to showcase the different sides of the band and also display some form of growth from their preceding album. Partington had written six songs on the album before entering the studio. While touring Europe, the US went to war in Iraq. According to Partington, the group did not "want to be playing a show when there's something so much more important going on." As a result, the band cancelled the remainder of the tour, and returned to the US. Partington recalled that he and McMahon did "a lot of writing" together, and were "really happy with the songs we had" going into the studio.

== Recording and production ==
The group would typically record an album in their home state of California. However, after constant touring, the band lost focus as Partington explained: "When you're away for a year touring straight, whenever you're home, whether you're working or not, your mind is like, 'Yes, I'm at home.'" The group decided that to help them focus, they would record in Seattle, Washington. Partington said they wanted the album's atmosphere to be a "little bit darker", which he felt they would not be able to achieve if they were "recording 45 miles away from home". On May 5, 2003, it was announced that the band was in the studio recording their next album at Robert Lang Studios and TMF with producer Jim Wirt. Wirt and Phil Kaffel acted as engineers, with Justin Armstrong as a secondary engineer with assistance from Geoff Ott.

Unlike with Leaving Through the Window, which was recorded alongside friends, the members decided to immerse themselves in the recording process for North. Robert Lang Studios gave the band the opportunity to track in isolation, without any distractions from their hometown and the weather of California. Two days of the process consisted of Partington in the live room, tracking one-take run-throughs of each song on guitar. With this approach, Partington improvised a lot of the parts, which yielded "lots of results." The band refrained from enhancing the recordings with studio effects, instead opting to showcase the songs through their musicianship.

On June 23, the band announced they were close to finishing recording. On the same day, the group worked on rough mixes of "Space" and "21 and Invincible" with Kaffel. The following Sunday, the band went to Los Angeles, California for a week to make sure "everything [was] finished and that [they] didn't forget anything." Further recording was done at 4th Street Recording in Santa Monica, California, with assistance from engineers Neil Couper, P.J. Smith and Jon Scholl. Smith also contributed additional background vocals. Kaffel and Wirt mixed the recordings at Interscope Studios in Santa Monica, with assistance from engineer Neal Ferrazzani. Further mixing was performed at Skip Saylor Recording in Los Angeles, with assistance from engineer James Mugshorn. Vlado Meller mastered the recordings at Sony Mastering in New York.

== Composition ==
"As You Sleep", "Down", "Me and the Moon", "Ruthless", "She Paints Me Blue", "Break Myself", "21 and Invincible", "Miss America" and "Watch the Sky" were credited to McMahon. "Space", "Only Ashes", "The Runaway", "I Won't Make You", and "This Broken Heart" were credited to Partington. Paul Buckmaster arranged and played the cello, alongside Larry Corbett on "Me and the Moon" and "The Runaway". The album's sound had been described as pop punk and pop, compared to Ben Folds Five. Alternative Addiction wrote that the group mixed "piano melodies with rocking guitars creating the 'melodic punk' sound" that was also on their second album. When talking about the album's title, Partington said it was inspired by recording in Seattle, "and also the fact that it was a growing process for everyone".

Discussing "Space", Partington said there was nothing more infuriating than being with someone who loves you more than life "but can't necessarily even come close to grasping what you are all about at times." "Only Ashes" is about frustration and failure stemming from one's own actions. The majority of "Me and the Moon" was written while McMahon was sharing a guest room with New Found Glory vocalist Jordan Pundik. The song talks about a woman killing her husband: the verses are about her doing the act of killing and the subsequently clean-up, while the choruses were set a trial scene. Though McMahon liked the melody and the piano parts, he felt choruses initially lacked a hook. While touring in the UK, he had taken mushrooms with friends; after breaking away from them he had decided to chase the Moon. He ended up in a locked bathroom with the words "It's me and the moon" on a piece of paper.

The verses to "Ruthless" were originally a bit longer than the finished version until people told them that they dragged on. McMahon was fine with dropping some of the lyrics but Partington wanted to include them. McMahon said it was a break-up song about a person he worked with. He added that the point of the track was that he can "still get my teeth out if I'm forced to, which I did." "Break Myself" is about complete desperation and being stuck in state where you're unable to help anyone. "21 and Invincible" initially had different lyrics before they were changed for release. McMahon would later perform the song with its original lyrics intact. Discussing "Watch the Sky", McMahon said he spent a night partying more than he usually did. After having a rough experience, he woke up and decided to sort himself out.

== Release and promotion ==
In mid-2003, MCA Records was absorbed by Universal Music Group label Geffen Records, which resulted in MCA's staff and roster being moved to Geffen. At the time, Partington said: "[You] can't worry about things that are out of your control ... I can't do anything about it so you just keep doing what you're doing." On July 12, 2003, North was announced for release. From mid-July to late August, the band supported 311 on their tour of the US. "Space" was released as a single on September 8, and released to modern rock radio a day later. A music video for the song was premiered by Fox Broadcasting Company on September 16 through their show The O.C. The video was filmed in August during the band's tour with 311 by director Mike Piscitelli. It featured five pillars, all of them fitted with video monitors, placed in various locations within Los Angeles, such as in an alleyway or at a bus stop. In September and October, the band supported Good Charlotte on their US arena tour.

On October 14, 2003, the band appeared on IMX. North was released on October 21 through Geffen and Drive-Thru Records. Around the album's release, the band was featured on Jimmy Kimmel Live!, as well as appearing on MTV2 programs New Faces of Rock and Advanced Warning. From late October to early December 2003, the band went on a headlining tour across the US with support from Rx Bandits, Mae, Days Away and the Format. The first date of the tour, which was planned to take place in San Diego, was postponed till mid-December due to California wildfires. Towards its conclusion, Rx Bandits dropped off, citing personal reasons, and were replaced by different acts for the remaining nights. Following this, the group toured across Japan and Europe in early 2004. On February 1, it was announced that guitarist William Tell had left the band to focus on his own music. Tell said that he had been writing music since he was younger, and put it on the backburner since joining the group. However, he "knew that at some point I'd have to go back to that. It's what makes me feel complete."

Bobby Anderson of River City High took over Tell's position; the group had previously toured with River City High and looked up to Anderson. Partington called him "a great player, [and] a really good singer." The group did a series of radio station appearances and played on college campuses throughout February and March. Following this, "Ruthless" was released to radio on March 15. The band headlined a few shows leading up to co-headlining performances with Yellowcard. Though this was initially for six shows, it was later expanded into a full tour running in March and April with support from Steriogram and the Format. To help promote it, the group offered a free live album, which recorded in November, to people that bought North at select retailers. Further US shows were played in May with the Rocket Summer and included a co-headlining spot with the Ataris at the RiverFusion festival. Following this, the band supported the Offspring on an Australian tour in June.

== Reception ==
Professional ratings
Review scores
Source	Rating
AllMusic	3.5/5 stars
Alternative Addiction	5/5 stars
Blender	1/5 stars
Entertainment Weekly	C
IGN	7.9/10
Melodic	3.5/5 stars
Punknews.org	2.5/5 stars
Rolling Stone	3/5 stars

=== Critical response ===
North received a positive reception from critics. AllMusic reviewer Andrew Leahey wrote that McMahon traded "shunning the drunk high school girls and classroom bullies" on their second album for "thoughtful ruminations on love, celebrity, and the steady approach of adulthood." Leahey noted that while the album contained "some filler ... probably more" than Leaving Through the Window, North showed that the group had the "maturity to move past the majority of their Warped Tour brethren." Alternative Addiction wrote that upon hearing the first chord, fans would "immediately recognize" McMahon's growth as a songwriter. IGN writer Jesse Lord noted that while second albums often fall into a sophomore slump, North leaves fan with "purely good music to enjoy." He mentioned that McMahon's piano "blends in with the band so much better" compared to Leaving Through the Window, coming across as "feel[ing] natural, [and] not contrived." He also said that the album was "mature" and displayed "signs that the band has aged; yet they are not pretentious about it, and are still in touch with their emotions."

Kaj Roth of Melodic wrote that, despite a year passing since the group's previous album, it was "enough to grow at least 10 years in life experience," noting that the album featured "smart/intelligent" Third Eye Blind-esque rock songs. Roth pondered if McMahon listened to Vanessa Carlton, since he pushed the songs "one step further into an adorable trip of melodic euphoria." The Phoenix writer Sean Richardson wrote that with North, the band "continue to prove themselves one of the most tuneful outfits in modern rock." Richardson noted that halfway into the album, when the songs' "middling tempos start to bleed together," the group sounds "as if they were striving for a level of maturity that’s not quite within reach." Punknews.org reviewer Adam White called it "a more solemn and paced record," compared to their second album. White noted that it featured "lots of contemplative ballads," all of which "showcas[e] Andrew MacMahon's characteristic piano and smooth vocals." Kristin Roth of Rolling Stone wrote that album "delves into an entirely different world" with its lyrics "explor[ing] a darker place, but just what that place is, it's hard to say."

=== Commercial performance and legacy ===
North charted at number 24 on the Billboard 200 chart, selling 41,000 copies in its first week of release. It also charted at number 152 in the UK. "Space" charted at number 37 on the Alternative Songs chart. By March 2004, the album had sold 222,000 copies. By March 2005, the album had sold 330,000 copies in the US, and by June, album sales stood at 339,000 copies. Looking back in 2010, Partington said the group were "frustrated" with the album's lack of success: "We had put in all this hard work and we were doing everything we could, but it felt like certain parts of the whole machine weren’t necessarily working in our favor." To celebrate the album's 10th anniversary, it was released on vinyl for the first time in November 2013 through independent label Enjoy the Ride Records.

== Track listing ==
Track listing adapted from the album's liner notes.

All tracks are written by Andrew McMahon unless otherwise noted.

No.	Title	Writer(s)	Length
1.	"As You Sleep"		3:09
2.	"Space"	Josh Partington	2:57
3.	"Down"		3:28
4.	"Only Ashes"	Partington	3:28
5.	"Me and the Moon"		4:07
6.	"The Runaway"	Partington	3:03
7.	"Ruthless"		3:24
8.	"She Paints Me Blue"		3:39
9.	"Break Myself"		3:16
10.	"I Won't Make You"	Partington	3:50
11.	"21 and Invincible"		3:19
12.	"Miss America"		3:51
Total length:			41:31

International bonus tracks (used in various combinations)
No.	Title	Writer(s)	Length
1.	"Watch the Sky"
2.	"This Broken Heart"	Partington
3.	"Unravel"	Björk
4.	"Just Like a Woman" (Originally released on tribute album)	Bob Dylan
5.	"Space (Live Acoustic)"	Partington

== Personnel ==
Credits and personnel adapted from the album's liner notes.

Something Corporate

- Andrew McMahon – piano, lead vocals
- Brian Ireland – drums, background vocals
- Kevin "Clutch" Page – bass, background vocals
- Josh Partington – lead guitar, background vocals
- William Tell – rhythm guitar, background vocals

Additional musicians

- P.J. Smith – additional background vocals
- Paul Buckmaster – cello arranger, cello (tracks 5 and 6)
- Larry Corbett – cello (tracks 5 and 6)

Production

- Jim Wirt – producer, engineer, mixing
- Phil Kaffel – engineer, mixing
- C.J Eiriksson – Pro Tools editing
- Justin Armstrong – second engineer
- Tom Reisser – guitar tech
- Geoff Ott – assistant engineer
- Neil Couper – assistant engineer
- P.J. Smith – assistant engineer
- Jon Scholl – assistant engineer
- Neal Ferrazzani – assistant engineer
- James Mugshorn – assistant engineer
- Vlado Meller – mastering
- JP Robinson – art direction
- Tim Marris – design, illustration
- Chapman Baehler – band photography
- Hantti – band photography
- John Urband – photo of Will

== Charts ==
Chart performance
Chart (2003)	Peak position
Canadian Albums (Nielsen SoundScan)	73
UK Albums (Official Charts)	152
UK Rock & Metal Albums (Official Charts)	14
US Billboard 200	24

== See also ==
- Everything in Transit – McMahon's first post-Something Corporate release
