= For the Love of Harry: Everybody Sings Nilsson =

For The Love of Harry: Everybody Sings Nilsson

Studio album by various artists
- Released: May 9, 1995
- Recorded: October 1993–95
- Label: MusicMasters

For the Love of Harry: Everybody Sings Nilsson, released on 9 May 1995 by Musicmasters, is a tribute album by various artists and dedicated to the songs of American musician Harry Nilsson. The album was released the year after Nilsson's death. Proceeds went to the Coalition to Stop Gun Violence.

== Background ==
Shortly before Nilsson's 1993 heart attack, he was visited by Al Kooper of Blood, Sweat & Tears, who had previously recorded versions of Nilsson's "Without Her" and "Mournin’ Glory Story". Kooper learned of Nilsson's financial troubles and later met with producer Danny Kapilian with the idea of persuading Nilsson's friends and colleagues to record a tribute album in his honor. Nilsson gave his blessings for the project, and suggested that one of his favorite bands, Jellyfish, be included.

== Track listing ==
All tracks are written by Harry Nilsson, except where noted.

No.	Title	Performed by	Length
1.	"Remember (Christmas)"	Randy Newman	2:22
2.	"Turn on Your Radio"	Marc Cohn	3:55
3.	"One"	Aimee Mann	3:01
4.	"Coconut"	Fred Schneider	5:06
5.	"Joy"	Joe Ely	3:58
6.	"Lay Down Your Arms"	Ringo Starr and Stevie Nicks	3:25
7.	"Without Her"	Gerry Beckley, Robert Lamm, and Carl Wilson	4:28
8.	"Jump into the Fire"	LaVern Baker	3:36
9.	"The Moonbeam Song"	Steve Forbert	3:30
10.	"You're Breakin' My Heart"	Peter Wolf and The Houseparty 5	1:53
11.	"Mournin' Glory Story"	Jennifer Trynin	2:55
12.	"Salmon Falls" (Nilsson, Klaus Voormann)	Al Kooper	4:42
13.	"The Puppy Song"	Victoria Williams	3:20
14.	"Don't Forget Me"	Marshall Crenshaw	3:31
15.	"This Could Be the Night" (Nilsson, Phil Spector)	Brian Wilson	2:31
16.	"Think About Your Troubles"	Jellyfish	2:42
17.	"The Lottery Song"	Bill Lloyd	2:25
18.	"Good Old Desk"	Ron Sexsmith	2:06
19.	"Me and My Arrow"	Adrian Belew	3:12
20.	"I Guess the Lord Must Be in New York City"	Richard Barone	2:40
21.	"Spaceman"	The Roches and Mark Johnson	3:41
22.	"Don't Leave Me"	John Cowan	3:56
23.	"Lifeline"	Jimmy Webb	4:01
