= William Tell (musician) =

- Born: February 7, 1980 (age 46); Mission Viejo, California, U.S.
- Years active: 1984–present
- Spouse: Lauren Conrad (m. 2014)
- Children: 2
- Musical career
- Genres: Alternative rock, Pop punk
- Instruments: Vocals, guitar, bass
- Labels: Universal, New Door
- Member of: Something Corporate

William John Tell is a rhythm guitarist and backing vocalist for the piano-rock band Something Corporate. After leaving the band in 2004 for a solo career, William Tell was signed as a New Door Records solo artist. His first solo record, You Can Hold Me Down, was released on March 13, 2007. Tell earned a J.D. degree from USC Gould School of Law in 2014.

== Biography ==
William John Tell learned to play guitar from his father (also named William Tell) at a young age and began writing his own songs as well. He met some of the members of Something Corporate through mutual friends and one night when they were all playing at the same nightclub, he was asked to temporarily fill in, as their rhythm guitarist Richard Hernandez had left to study abroad. On March 27, 2001, Tell permanently joined the Drive-Thru Records piano rock band Something Corporate.

Tell witnessed the success of Something Corporate over the three years he played with them — through their EP Audioboxer, released on October 2, 2001, to their full-length albums Leaving Through the Window (2002) and North (2003), as well as tours with bands like New Found Glory.

During a break between touring for the band, Tell decided that he wanted to pursue his own solo career. On February 4, 2004, it was announced by the band that Tell had left. He returned home to California and began writing songs. His first song, titled "Radio Sound" (which later appeared on his debut album as "Sounds"), was about his mixed emotions dealing with leaving his friends and former band. Another song from the same album, "Just for You", appeared on the soundtrack to the film The Sisterhood of the Traveling Pants. Through the course of the next two years, Tell would continue writing and rewriting material, as well as recording. Brian Ireland, drummer for Something Corporate, would come in to help him during the recording process and also play shows as part of Tell's band. One of Tell's many performances was the Bamboozle Left festival in Pomona, California on October 14, 2006.

In 2006, Tell was signed to Universal Records' subsidiary New Door Records as a solo artist and began putting the final touches to his debut album. He collaborated with another Something Corporate member, Andrew McMahon, for the track "Fairfax" on the record. During January 2007, Tell recorded a practice session for the website Rehearsals.com and on March 13, 2007, Tell released his 10-track solo debut album titled You Can Hold Me Down (named after one of the songs).

== Personal life ==
In February 2012, Tell began dating former Laguna Beach star and fashion designer Lauren Conrad. They became engaged in October 2013, and married on September 13, 2014, in California. Their son, Liam James Tell, was born on July 5, 2017. Their second child named Charlie Wolf was born October 8, 2019.

== Discography ==
=== Albums ===
- You Can Hold Me Down (2007)

=== EPs ===
- Lovers & Haters (2009)

=== Non-album tracks ===
- "After All"
- "Katie (Where'd You Go?)"
- "This Mess"
- "Yesterday is Calling"
- "Young at Heart (Acoustic)"
- "Let's Go to Bed" - released as a single in 2011
