= You Can Hold Me Down =

Studio album by William Tell
- Released: 2007
- Recorded: 2004–2006
- Genres: Alternative rock pop rock
- Labels: Universal Records; New Door Records
- Producers: Brian Ireland, PJ Smith, Mike Green, Darren Tehrani, Jim Wirt, William Tell, Thom Panunzio

You Can Hold Me Down is the debut album by William Tell, first released on March 13, 2007 through Universal Records and New Door Records.

== Track listing ==
All tracks are written by William Tell unless otherwise noted.

No.	Title	Writer(s)	Length
1.	"Jeannie"		3:01
2.	"Slipping Under (Sing Along to Your Favorite Song)"	Tell, PJ Smith	3:34
3.	"Trouble"		2:55
4.	"Fairfax (You're Still the Same)"		2:49
5.	"Like You, Only Sweeter"	Tell, Darren Tehrani	3:41
6.	"Maybe Tonight"	Tell, Mike Green	3:13
7.	"Young at Heart"		2:46
8.	"Sounds"	Tell, Smith	3:05
9.	"Just for You"	Tell, Green	3:33
10.	"You Can Hold Me Down"	Tell, Tehrani	3:23
Total length:			32:00

Bonus tracks
No.	Title	Writer(s)	Length
1.	"After All" (Best Buy bonus track; hidden track beginning at about 4:27 during track 10)		5:04
2.	"Yesterday is Calling" (iTunes bonus track)	Smith, James Bourne	3:43
3.	"Young at Heart (Acoustic)" (Target bonus track)		2:54
4.	"This Mess" (Walmart bonus track)		3:23
5.	"Katie (Where'd You Go?)" (Walmart bonus track)		3:48

== Reception ==
Professional ratings
Review scores
Source	Rating
MammothPress.com	7/10 stars
allmusic.com	3/5 stars

Commercial performance

You Can Hold Me Down charted at #11 on the Top Heatseekers chart.

== Personnel ==
- William Tell - vocals, guitars, piano (track 7), background vocals, programming (track 9)
- Darren Tehrani - guitar (track 1), bass (tracks 1, 3, 4, 5, 8, 10), background vocals (tracks 1, 5, 7, 10), piano (tracks 5, 10), Rhodes (tracks 5, 10)
- Brian Ireland - drums, percussion (track 10), background vocals (tracks 3, 5, 10), programming (tracks 3, 6)
- Derek Deblieux - guitar (tracks 2, 6, 8, 9)
- Nick Foxer - background vocals (tracks 2, 3, 8), piano (track 6)
- Mike Green - bass (track 6), guitar (tracks 6, 9)
- PJ Smith - background vocals (track 8)
- Sid Jordan - bass (track 10)
- Jim Wirt - bass (track 2), Juno (track 2)
- Andrew McMahon - piano (track 4)
- Ryan Tedder - beatbox (track 4)
- Ali Carr - Italian (track 1)
