= American Subversive =

2010 novel by David Goodwillie

- First edition (publ. Scribner)
- Author: David Goodwillie
- Language: English
- Genre: Fiction
- Publisher: Scribner
- Publication date: 2010

American Subversive is a novel by David Goodwillie published in 2010.

== Plot ==
American Subversive tells the tale of Aidan Cole, a New York-based failed journalism student turned Manhattan gossip blogger and Paige Roderick, a "home-grown" eco-terrorist turned radical by the Iraq War death of her beloved brother. The novel explores the roots of radicalism in the modern world and it is structured as a split memoir, alternating between the points of view of the two characters, who are now hiding in separate safe houses, following a radical action that went terribly wrong.

== Reception ==
Writing for The Daily Beast, Claire Howorth describes the novel as "a fast-paced, engaging novel of pop-culture and big ideas, authentically subversive, and thoroughly American" which "spins the themes of morality, loyalty, and patriotism into an insightfully entertaining commentary on modern history and contemporary society", while Publishers Weekly hailed it as "an incisive depiction of radicalism’s seductive roots".

Criticism of the book focused on the shallow nature of the two main characters and the handling of the emerging love story which "feels more expected than earned", according to a review in the New York Times. Similarly, NPR questions the "bland romance" between Aidan and Paige, claiming that "Goodwillie is a terrific and observant writer, but even he can't roll political critique, social comedy, fast-paced thriller and mushy love story into one convincing package".

American Subversive was a New York Times Notable Book of 2010, and a Vanity Fair and Publishers Weekly top ten spring debut.
