= Spaceman (Harry Nilsson song) =

Single by Nilsson

from the album Son of Schmilsson
- B-side: "Turn on Your Radio"
- Released: 4 September 1972 (US); 14 September 1972 (UK)
- Recorded: March–April 1972
- Studio: Trident Studios and Apple Studio, London, England
- Genre: Pop rock
- Length: 3:33
- Label: RCA Victor
- Songwriter: Harry Nilsson
- Producer: Richard Perry

Nilsson singles chronology
"You're Breaking My Heart" (1972)	"Spaceman" (1972)	"Remember (Christmas)" (1972)

"Spaceman" is a song written and recorded by the American singer-songwriter Harry Nilsson, released on his 1972 album Son of Schmilsson.

One of the highlights on Son of Schmilsson, with its dramatic opening fanfare and a cross between folk with a heavy R&B rhythm, the song explains the desire and downfall of the narrator, who wished to be a spaceman and now wants to go back to Earth but is stuck in space. The song was released between the final two Apollo moon missions, 16 and 17, and is indicative of the general public attitudes towards the end of the Moon missions. The singer is expressing disappointment at his accomplishments; becoming an astronaut, and is emotionally ready to give it up and "return safely to the sea."

The song was one of the three Nilsson's songs that became a hit of the year, the other two being "Remember (Christmas)" and "You're Breaking My Heart".

Arranger Paul Buckmaster said that he asked Nilsson if he could put a string section on the song, and Nilsson agreed. Buckmaster brought more than strings: He included the medieval instruments shawm and sackbut. He said that someone named Moxie, "the genius of the harmonica in London at the time," played bass harmonica in a "chugging" rhythm style, part of the rhythm section.

"Spaceman" featured prominently in a trailer for the HBO comedy series Avenue 5 (2020), and in the first and final episodes of first season for the 2020 Netflix comedy series Space Force.

The song was covered by the American band the Roches on the 1995 tribute album For the Love of Harry: Everybody Sings Nilsson.

== Personnel ==
- Harry Nilsson – vocals, electric piano
- Nicky Hopkins – piano
- Peter Frampton – acoustic guitar
- Chris Spedding – acoustic guitar
- John Uribe – acoustic guitar
- Klaus Voormann – bass
- Ringo Starr (credited as Richie Snare) – drums
- Richard Perry – percussion
- "Moxie" – bass harmonica
- Paul Buckmaster – orchestral arrangement

== Chart performance ==
Chart (1972)	Peak position
Australia (Kent Music Report)	95
Canada RPM Top Singles	12
U.S. Billboard Hot 100	23
