= Sounds Nice =

British musical group

- Genres: Pop
- Years active: 1969–70
- Labels: Parlophone, Rare Earth
- Past members: Tim Mycroft; Paul Buckmaster

Sounds Nice was a British instrumental pop group which recorded in the 1960s.

== Career ==
The group was founded by Tim Mycroft, keyboardist for Gun, and the name was taken from a comment by Paul McCartney on hearing a demo tape that it "sounds nice".

The band's first single was a cover of "Je t'aime... moi non plus" by Jane Birkin and Serge Gainsbourg, re-titled "Love At First Sight", taking advantage of the original being banned by many British radio stations for its suggestive singing. It was released while the "parent" single was rising in popularity and had the advantage, unlike the original, of being played on Top of the Pops.

The single entered the UK Singles Chart at no. 45 for the week ending 6 September 1969, while the original was at no. 8; it eventually peaked at no. 18 for the week ending 18 October 1969, just as the original was displaced from the number 1 slot. The song also got to no. 8 in South Africa.

The follow-up was another instrumental version of a French song, "La Jeanne", suggested to the band by Patti Boyd; arranger Paul Buckmaster, after a sleepless night trying to think of an English title, settled on "Sleepless Night".

It was not a hit, but Parlophone had enough faith in the concept to allow Mycroft and Buckmaster to assemble session musicians (including Clem Cattini, Herbie Flowers, and Chris Spedding) to create an album of varying styles, named "Love At First Sight" after the band's sole success.

The album also missed the charts, and the two prime movers went their separate ways: Mycroft as a soloist, and Buckmaster originally joining the Chris Farlowe-led band The Hill.

== See also ==
- List of rock instrumentals
