= David Goodwillie (author) =

American author

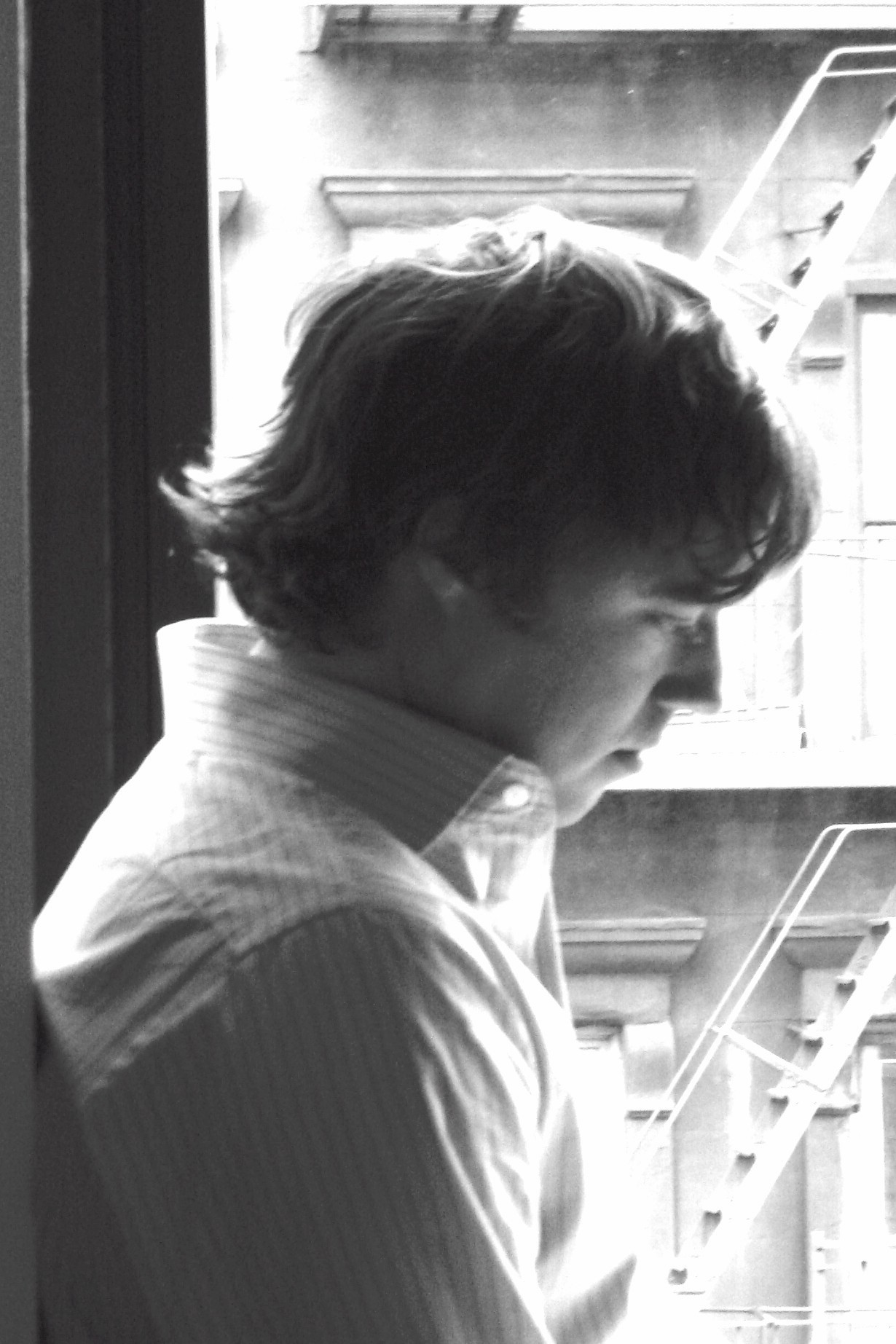
- David Goodwillie
- Born: Paris, France
- Occupation: Author
- Writing career
- Language: English
- Genres: Fiction, non-fiction
- Notable work: Seemed Like a Good Idea at the Time
- Website: davidgoodwillie.com/site

David Goodwillie is an American novelist, memoirist and journalist. He has published three books: the novels Kings County and American Subversive, and the memoir Seemed Like a Good Idea at the Time.

== Early life ==
Goodwillie was born in Paris and grew up in London. Upon moving to the U.S., his family lived in Montclair, N.J., Baltimore, M.D., and Washington, D.C. He graduated from St. Georges School and Kenyon College, where he was captain of the baseball team and drafted to play professionally in 1994 by the Newark Buffalos of the independent Frontier League. After a short lived career, he moved to New York City, where he held several improbable jobs, including Private Investigator for Kroll Inc., Specialist in Charge at Sotheby's Auction House, and Internet entrepreneur. Details of Goodwillie's early life are recounted in his 2006 memoir Seemed Like a Good Idea at the Time.

== Career ==
Fiction

Goodwillie's debut novel, American Subversive, was published by Scribner in 2010. Hailed as "genuinely thrilling" by The New Yorker, and "a triumphant work of fiction" by the Associated Press, it was a New York Times Notable Book an Editors' Choice of 2010 and a Vanity Fair and Publishers Weekly top ten spring debut.

His second novel, Kings County, sold to Simon & Schuster in September 2017, in what Publishers Marketplace described as a "significant deal". Published in 2020, it was an Editors' Choice for The New York Times and a finalist for the 2021 Gotham Book Prize. Reviewing Kings County in The New York Times, Adelle Waldman called it, "a suspenseful read...Goodwillie is a stylish writer, smart and witty without being a show-off...[His] characters are so likable, so sincere in their affection and decent in their moral decision making...A very good new novel."

Nonfiction

Goodwillie's first book, the memoir Seemed Like a Good Idea at the time, was published by Algonquin Books in 2006. Written partly at the Chelsea Hotel, it tells the story of his journey through downtown Manhattan as he struggles to become a writer. The Louisville Courier-Journal called it a "mesmerizing memoir and searing sketch of a decade in decline...[Goodwillie] conveys his wisdom via syntax that is simultaneously sobering insightful and amusing." But Toby Young, in a Wall Street Journal take down, wrote that, "There were moments in this book when I wished [Goodwillie] hadn't given up his day job."

He has written several investigative features for national magazines, including a 2012 cover story on "Nuclear Divers" for Popular Science and an exposé on the Italian Mafia's activities in Manhattan's garment trucking industry for the Fall 1997 issue of BlackBook magazine.

Goodwillie has written about books for The New York Times and The Daily Beast, and his fiction and nonfiction have appeared in New York Magazine, Newsweek, Popular Science, Men's Health, BlackBook, The New York Observer, The New York Post, The Rumpus and Deadspin.

TV/Film

On April 6, 2022, The Hollywood Reporter announced that Kings County had been optioned as a TV series by producers Lindsay Shookus and Jessie Creel, and is being adapted by Emmy and Peabody Award-winning writer Allison Silverman.
