= AbsolutePunk =

American music website

- The AbsolutePunk homepage in November 2009.
- Website type: Music, news, and media
- Available in: English
- Creator: Jason Tate
- Website: www.absolutepunk.net
- Registration: Optional
- Launched: June 6, 2000
- Current status: Defunct (URL now redirects to Chorus.fm)
- closed April 1, 2016

AbsolutePunk was a website, online community, and alternative music news source founded by Jason Tate (the most recent CEO). The website mainly focused on artists who are relatively unknown to mainstream audiences, but it was known to feature artists who have eventually achieved crossover success, for example, Blink-182 and Fall Out Boy. The primary musical genres of focus were emo and pop punk, but other genres were included.

AbsolutePunk was acquired by Buzzmedia in 2008. After Buzzmedia filed for bankruptcy, Tate reclaimed the site's domain and name and consequently shut the site down on April 1, 2016.

== Website ==
Founded June 6, 2000, by Jason Tate, the website focused on music industry news, and included album reviews, interviews, articles, journals and photo galleries. The site also allowed user interaction via a vBulletin Internet Forum system; users could register their own personalized account, create a profile, and comment on nearly every portion of the site. Special accounts were afforded to industry figures (such as record label representatives) and band members denoting them as such, with threads often created specifically to allow users to interact with them.

The website originally started as a Blink-182/MxPx fan site. In 2005, the site was drawing six million hits daily. By 2006, the website was noted for engaging teenagers, and was beginning to chip away at the dominance of MySpace, according to OMMA online media magazine.

The social media network Buzznet purchased AbsolutePunk in May 2008. AbsolutePunk's community included over 500,000 music fans, making it one of the largest alternative music zines on the Internet.

== Content ==
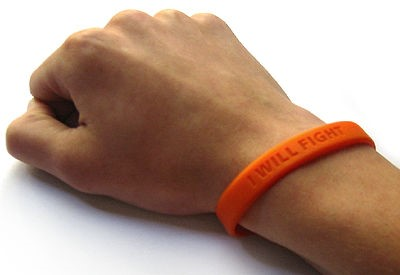
AbsolutePunk's orange "I Will Fight" silicone charity wristband

Even though it lost some content because of numerous server switches over the years, AbsolutePunk still featured over 55,000 news articles, 2500 reviews, 500 interviews, and 52,000 files in its multimedia gallery.

Forums

One of AbsolutePunk's main purposes was to connect music fans with one another through its extensive online forums.

Accomplishments

The website gained a strong following in the alternative music scene over the years, allowing it to sponsor various tours and host or premiere exclusive content from many bands. In the August 2007 issue of Blender, owner Jason Tate was named #18 in their list of Top 25 "Most Influential People in Online Music".

On June 1, 2005, vocalist and pianist Andrew McMahon of the bands Something Corporate and Jack's Mannequin was diagnosed with leukemia. AbsolutePunk raised approximately $16,400 for the Leukemia Research Foundation by selling over 6,000 orange gel bracelets online. The wristbands read "I Will Fight" in reference to a well-known song ("Watch the Sky") by Something Corporate.
