= Something Corporate =

American rock band

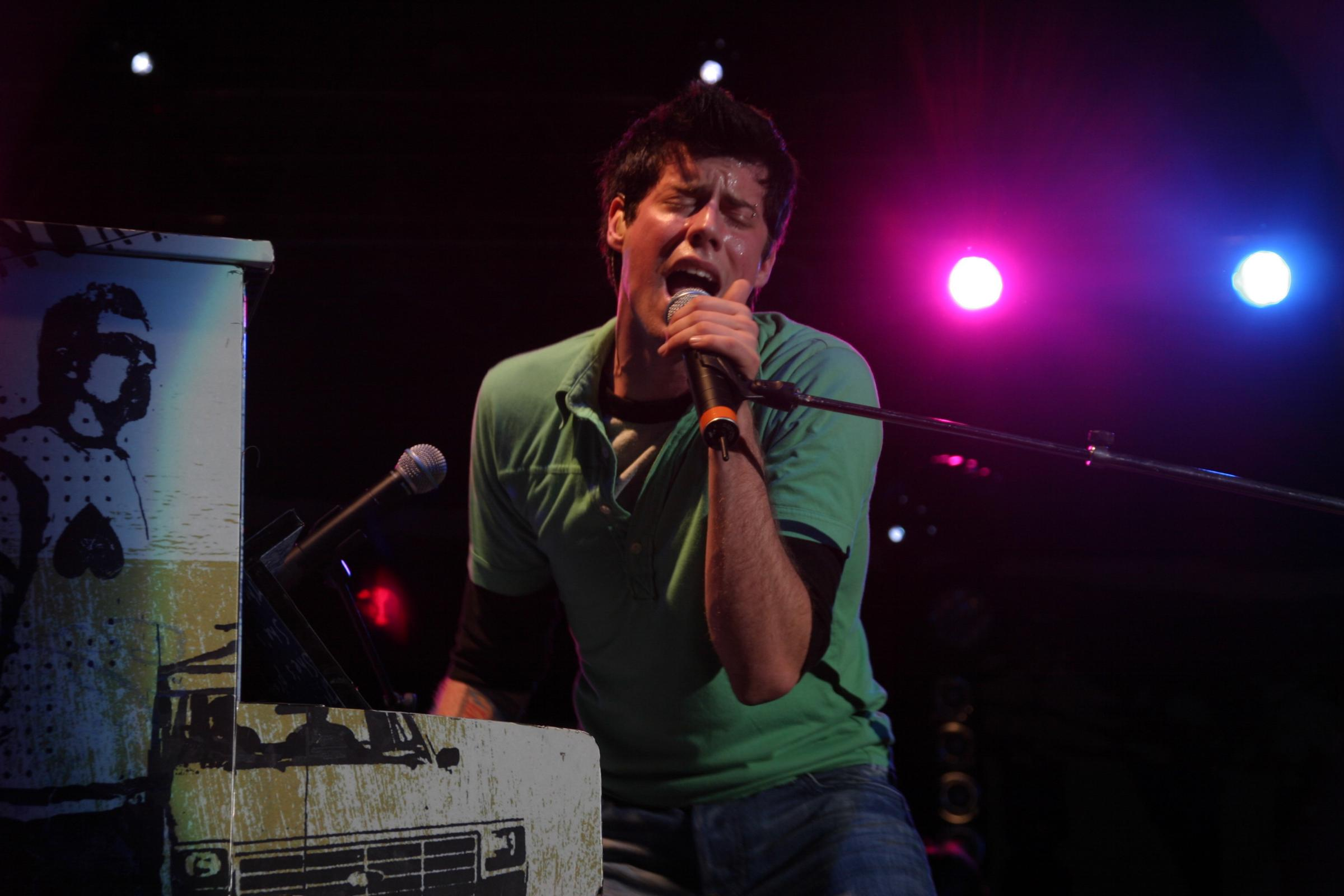
- Frontman Andrew McMahon performing in concert

Background information
- Origin: Laguna Niguel, California, United States
- Genre: Alternative rock · pop-punk · emo
- Years active: 1998–2006, 2010, 2023–present
- Labels: Drive-Thru, Geffen, MCA
- Members: Andrew McMahon; Josh Partington; Kevin "Clutch" Page; Brian Ireland; William Tell
- Past members: Bobby "Raw" Anderson; Reuben Hernandez
- Website: SomethingCorporate.com

Something Corporate (also known as SoCo) is an American rock band from Laguna Niguel, California, formed in 1998. Their currently active line-up includes vocalist and pianist Andrew McMahon, guitarists Josh Partington and William Tell, bassist Kevin Page and drummer Brian Ireland.

Following their formation, Something Corporate recorded demos that were eventually released as an independent, studio album entitled Ready... Break. Soon after, they were signed to MCA Records but were released under the Drive-Thru Records banner for their debut EP Audioboxer. Their first single, "If You C Jordan", was their most successful, peaking at number 29 on the Alternative Songs chart. Their first album released through the major label was Leaving Through the Window (2002) which premiered at Number 1/Hot Shot Debut on the Billboard Top Heatseekers chart on June 8, 2002 and eventually peaked at number 101 on the Billboard 200.

Something Corporate went on hiatus in 2004 and no longer had any recording contracts with their record labels. During the hiatus, McMahon found success in his side-project, Jack's Mannequin. Something Corporate briefly reunited in October 2006 (at a Jack's Mannequin show) to play a short set. In December 2009, Something Corporate officially announced their reunion to tour in 2010 and released a greatest hits album. McMahon announced during an August 3, 2010, visit to Milwaukee that the band had collectively sold over 1 million total records in the band's ten years of existence. On September 9, 2022 the band reunited to play a surprise show for McMahon’s 40th birthday at House of Blues in Anaheim, California.

The band re-united its core line-up to play When We Were Young Festival in 2023 (and a headlining show at House of Blues Las Vegas), hosted a New Years Eve show in Anaheim, CA on December 30 and 31, 2023, and will be touring the Summer of 2024 as well as performing on the Andrew McMahon's Holiday from Real Cruise in November 2024.

== History ==
=== Formation and early releases (1998–2002) ===
Andrew McMahon and Brian Ireland had a class together at Dana Hills High School, during which the pair often talked about music. Ireland received a drum set for Christmas, and the pair subsequently started a band with bassist Kevin "Clutch" Page. The group, known as Left Here, was formed for a Battle of the Bands contest. Despite winning, they ended up breaking up shortly afterwards. In September 1998, McMahon, Page, and Ireland, merged with lead guitarist Josh Partington and rhythm guitarist Reuben Hernandez, to form Something Corporate. Following a few shows, McMahon realized that he would be unable to pursue a career in music if he continued his education. McMahon's parents were supportive of his music, but suggested doing college applications if the band didn't work out within a year. The group were unable to secure gigs due to being underage outside of parties and various Battle of the Bands competitions. During this time, the group shared an apartment in Dana Point, where McMahon and Hernandez wrote a number of the band's early material.

Throughout high school the band tried to play at local venue the Coach House, which was owned by Gary Folgner. He kept declining the band's offers as they didn't have any releases out. However, when Folgner saw the band live, he gave them money to record their debut album Ready... Break at the Coach House and Galaxy Theater. The band released Ready... Break in November 2000. On March 27, 2001, Something Corporate announced an official change to the band's lineup; Hernandez left to pursue college and was replaced by William Tell. The band signed with MCA Records and Drive-Thru Records and released the band's official debut, an EP titled Audioboxer (2001). It was promoted nationwide through tours, in-store performances at Tower Records stores and a television appearance on The Late Late Show with Craig Kilborn on February 25, 2002. The EP featured the single "iF yoU C Jordan", with its music video starring American Pie's Chris Owen.

=== Debut album and follow-up (2002–2004) ===
In May 2002, Something Corporate released their debut major label album, Leaving Through the Window. It contained the singles "I Woke Up in a Car" and "Punk Rock Princess". The album hit number one on the Billboard Top Heatseekers chart and number 101 on the Billboard 200. Something Corporate released a half-hour home video on DVD, titled A Year in the Life in November 2002. Furthermore, they released the B-sides compilation EP Songs for Silent Movies, only available in Japan.

In October 2003, Something Corporate released their second full-length record, North. The album debuted at number 24 on the Billboard 200. They launched the album with an appearance on Jimmy Kimmel Live!, performing the songs "If You C Jordan" and "Space", the latter of which became the only single from the album. In February 2004, it was confirmed that William Tell had left Something Corporate to pursue a solo career. Bobby "Raw" Anderson, formerly of the band River City High, became Tell's replacement. Ireland assisted Tell in the recording of his debut album, You Can Hold Me Down. Ireland has several credits on the album, including drums, programming, and background vocals. Ireland also toured and performed live as part of Tell's band. On May 20, 2004, Something Corporate filmed its concert at the Ventura Theater in Ventura, California. The footage was released as the band's second DVD, Live at the Ventura Theater, on November 9. The band supported its release with a short two-week college tour in November.

=== Hiatus (2004–2009) ===
In summer 2004, the band grew exhausted from spending years on the road and decided to take a break. The band promised the break would not be a permanent one in a 2005 interview with Concert Pipeline. McMahon said "I think for all of us it just got to the point where we were like 'Let's just go be our own people for a minute'-- not out of a desire to leave the band or break up Something Corporate-- quite the opposite. Let's reconnect with all the things that spawned the band in the first place." In January and February 2005, the band toured across the U.S. alongside Straylight Run, Hidden in Plain View, The Academy Is..., and Armor for Sleep. In April, 2005 the band played an outdoor concert at Phi Sigma Kappa fraternity at Indiana University as part of Little 500 festivities.

During the hiatus, McMahon formed a side project named Jack's Mannequin. The band released an album entitled Everything in Transit in August 2005. The day that recording for the album was completed, McMahon was diagnosed with acute lymphoblastic leukemia. He has since gone into remission. In 2008, McMahon released a second album with Jack's Mannequin, The Glass Passenger. The album debuted at number eight on the Billboard 200, surpassing the success he achieved with Something Corporate. Partington also formed the band Firescape, who released an EP, Rearden's Conscience, and studio album, Dancehall Apocolypse. In 2006, Ireland joined the Louisiana-based band Streamline as their drummer. He wrote two songs ("Let Go" and "Anything") for Streamline's 2009 EP, The Alchemist and the Arsonist, but left the band in November 2009. Ireland formed the band Live Oak Revue with his brothers, Derek and Matt Ireland, and friend Zak Salazar and released the EP, When the Dawn Breaks, on June 21, 2011. McMahon is featured on the track "Sinner's Heart."

In December 2005, the band announced they would re-group in January 2006 for rehearsals and plan to write their third album. In July 2006, McMahon said the group's hiatus wouldn't be permanent, and that they talked of touring early-to-mid 2007 and enter the studio after McMahon was finished working on the second Jack's Mannequin album. In October 2006, Something Corporate reunited to perform three songs; "Konstantine", "I Woke Up in a Car" and "Hurricane". They played at the end of McMahon's set with Jack's Mannequin at the Bamboozle Left festival. In December 2007, McMahon said that Something Corporate's status as a band could be described as is in "suspended animation". He told Alternative Press that he is more "nostalgically charged" than "creatively charged" to make another Something Corporate record.

In a February 2009 interview with Lansing State Journal, Andrew McMahon discussed the future of Something Corporate. He said, "As for releasing a full-length with a tour in the classic sense, I don't see that happening. But we're all great friends, and I do see us putting together new material and hitting the road. The fans have been so supportive and such a huge part of our lives that I would feel horrible not to at least give them something."

=== Reunions (2010, 2016, 2022–current) ===
On December 3, 2009, it was announced that they would be playing the Bamboozle Left Festival in Anaheim, California on March 28, 2010. On February 22 at the House of Blues in Chicago, Andrew McMahon announced that Something Corporate will be at Bamboozle Chicago on May 15. On March 29, 2010, AbsolutePunk.net reported that Something Corporate will also be playing Bamboozle Right in East Rutherford, New Jersey, on May 1.

In February 2010, Andrew McMahon announced that Something Corporate was planning a greatest hits release for the spring of 2010. The band returned to the studio to re-record two old songs which originally appeared on their unreleased "Galaxy Sessions" album: "Letters to Noelle" and "Wait". Adam Young of Owl City produced a new remix of "I Woke Up in a Car". The greatest hits album, named Played in Space: The Best of Something Corporate was released on April 27, 2010. On May 15, 2010, Something Corporate announced their August 2010 Reunion Tour on their website. In August 2011, McMahon said the band went back on hiatus.

On November 11, 2016 at the Seventh Annual Dear Jack Benefit, McMahon, Page, Ireland, Partington and Tell reunited to perform “Konstantine” and “Hurricane” at The Observatory in Santa Ana, California.

The final show of Andrew McMahon In The Wilderness' 2022 Hello Gone Days tour took place on September 9, 2022, in Anaheim, California and was a celebration of McMahon's 40th birthday. As part of the show, a surprise Something Corporate reunion was staged, where McMahon, Kevin Page, Brian Ireland, Josh Partington, and William Tell played a 5-song set. Wilderness band member Zac Clark sat in on keys.

Something Corporate performed at the 2023 When We Were Young Festival in Las Vegas with a headlining show at the House of Blues the night before. The House of Blues show marked the first time in nearly 20 years the core line-up of the band (Andrew McMahon, Kevin Page, Brian Ireland, Josh Partington, and William Tell) had performed a headlining show together. The reunion weekend was, in part, to recognize the 20th anniversary of North. The anniversary was further marked with re-pressing of the album, along with North. Additional reunion performances were soon announced, with two headlining shows in Anaheim, on December 30 and 31, 2023. The band performed on Weekend One of Austin City Limits Music Festival on October 5, 2024. Additional performances are to take place in November 2024 on the inaugural Andrew McMahon's Holiday from Real Cruise, set to feature all three of McMahon's projects: Something Corporate, Jack's Mannequin, and Andrew McMahon In The Wilderness.

== Musical style and legacy ==
AllMusic biographer Jason Birchmeier described the band's sound "polished, literate, radio-ready alt-rock." Leaving Through the Window and North have been described as pop-punk.

The booklet for the "I Woke Up in a Car" CD single states that "[if] indie-rock could ever be called elegant, Something Corporate would be that sound".

The staff of Consequence ranked the band at number 53 on their list of "The 100 Best Pop Punk Bands" in 2019.

== Band members ==
Current

- Andrew McMahon – lead vocals, piano (1998–2006, 2010, 2023–present)
- Josh Partington – lead guitar, backing vocals (1998–2006, 2010, 2023–present)
- Kevin "Clutch" Page – bass guitar (1998–2006, 2010, 2023–present)
- Brian Ireland – drums, percussion (1998–2006, 2010, 2023–present)
- William Tell – rhythm guitar, backing vocals (2001–2004, 2023–present)

Former

- Reuben Hernandez – rhythm guitar (1998–2001)
- Bobby "Raw" Anderson – rhythm guitar, backing vocals (2004–2006, 2010)

== Discography ==
=== Studio albums ===
Title	Album details	Peak chart positions					Sales
Title	Album details	US	CAN	FRA	UK	UK Rock	Sales
Ready... Break	Released: November 4, 2000; Format: CD; Label: Coach House	—	—	—	—	—	
Leaving Through the Window	Released: May 21, 2002; Format: CD, CS, DL, LP; Label: Drive-Thru, MCA (088 112 887-2)	101	—	138	—	38	US: 291,000
North	Released: October 21, 2003; Format: CD, DL, LP; Label: Geffen, Drive-Thru (B0001190-12)	24	73	—	152	14	US: 339,000
"—" denotes a release that did not chart.

=== Extended plays ===
Title	EP details	Peak chart positions
Title	EP details	US Heat.
Audioboxer	Released: October 2, 2001; Format: CD; Label: Drive-Thru (DTR#25, 088 112 734-2)	27
Songs for Silent Movies	Released: May 27, 2003; Format: CD; Label: Drive-Thru, MCA (UICC-1091)	—
"—" denotes a release that did not chart.

=== Compilations ===
Title	EP details	Peak chart positions
Title	EP details	US
Played in Space: The Best of Something Corporate	Released: April 27, 2010; Format: CD, DL; Label: Geffen (B0014195-02)	155
Icon	Released: March 19, 2013; Format: CD, DL; Label: Geffen (B0018004-02)	—
"—" denotes a release that did not chart.

=== Live and video albums ===
Title	Album details
A Year in the Life	Released: November 5, 2002; Format: DVD; Label: MCA (088 113 961-9)
Live at the Ventura Theater	Released: November 9, 2004; Format: DVD; Label: Drive-Thru, Geffen (B0003521-09)
Fillmore Theatre – November 5, 2003	Released: March 9, 2004; Format: CD, EP; Label: Geffen

=== Singles ===
Title	Year	Peak chart positions				Album
Title	Year	US Alt.	SCO	UK	UK Rock	Album
"If You C Jordan"	2002	29	94	68	12	Leaving Through the Window
"Hurricane"	2002	—	—	—	—	Leaving Through the Window
"I Woke Up in a Car"	2002	—	—	—	—	Leaving Through the Window
"Forget December"	2002	—	—	—	—	Non-album single
"Punk Rock Princess"	2003	—	37	33	3	Leaving Through the Window
"Space"	2003	37	—	—	—	North
"Ruthless"	2004	—	—	—	—	North
"—" denotes a release that did not chart.

=== Non-album tracks/unreleased albums ===
- Galaxy Sessions (2001)
- "Just Like a Woman" (Bob Dylan cover) – released on Listen to Bob Dylan: A Tribute (2005)
