= Gotta Get Up =

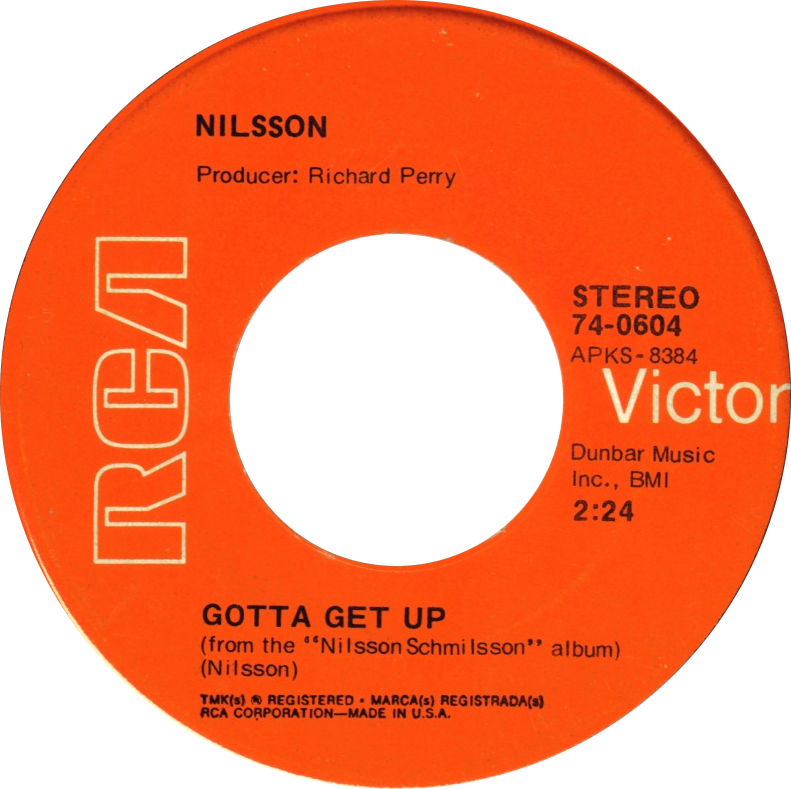
- Side B of the "Without You" US vinyl single

Single by Nilsson

from the album Nilsson Schmilsson
- A-side: "Without You"
- Released: October 11, 1971
- Recorded: 1971
- Genre: Pop; ragtime
- Length: 2:24
- Label: RCA Victor
- Songwriter: Harry Nilsson
- Producer: Richard Perry

Official audio
- "Gotta Get Up" on YouTube

"Gotta Get Up" is a song written by American singer-songwriter Harry Nilsson and the opening track from his 1971 album Nilsson Schmilsson. It was first released as the B-side to his single "Without You". "Gotta Get Up" is an upbeat pop song with a music hall feeling and lyrics about transitioning from carefree youth to adult responsibility. Nilsson based the lyrics on his parents and his experiences working at a bank.

== Overview ==
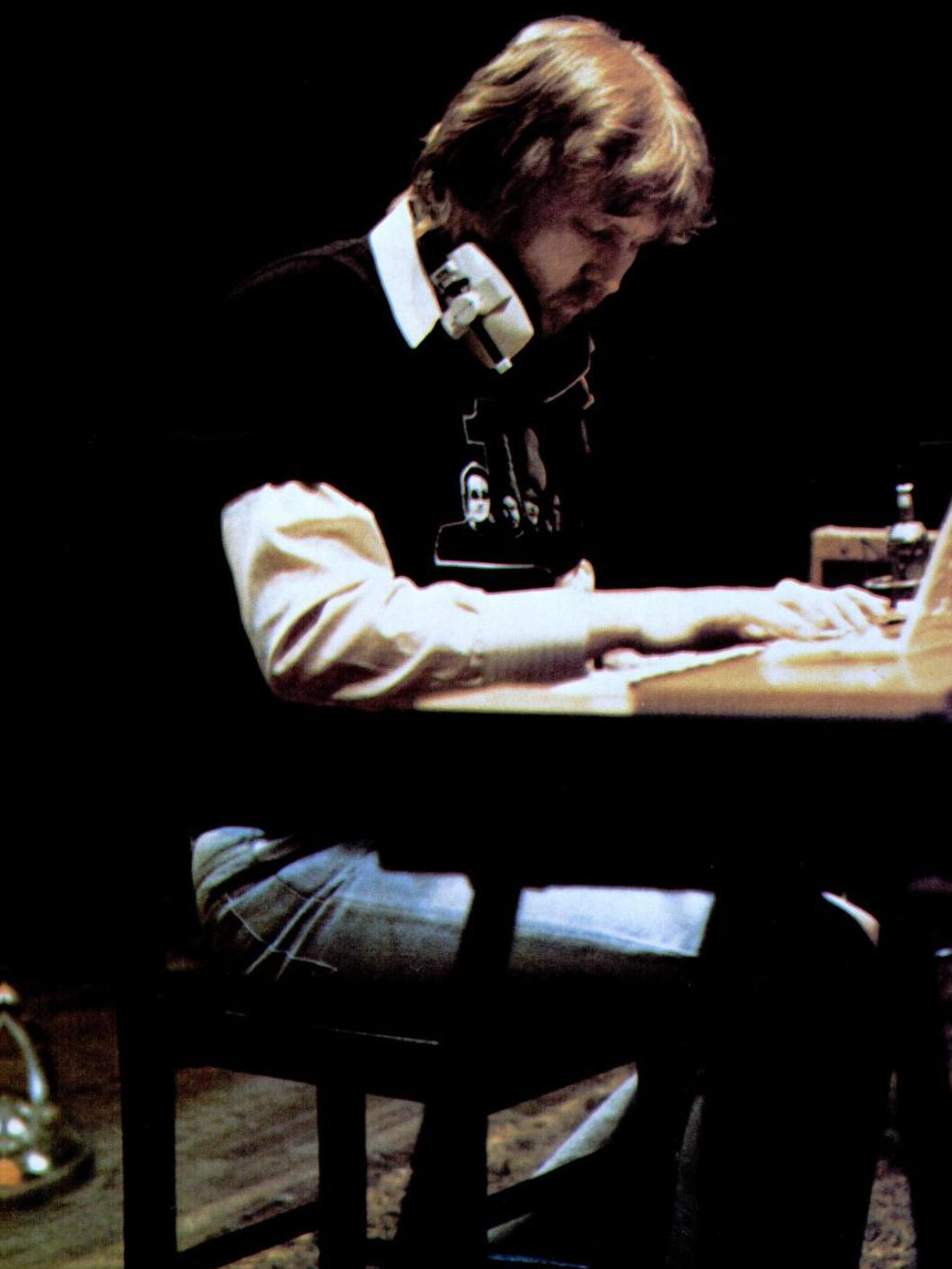
Nilsson, 1974

"Gotta Get Up" is about the transition from carefree youth to adult responsibility. The song was originally attempted in March 1968 as a potential track for Nilsson's Aerial Ballet (1968) or Harry (1969). This earlier version of the song is cheerier and more uptempo than the recording that was released on Nilsson Schmilsson. The remake takes on a more serious tone and features an aleatoric glissando at the end. Producer Richard Perry said that the addition was inspired by the number of takes devoted to the song: "We had to do so many takes that we got cabin fever and started messing around, and Harry decided to incorporate the craziness in the song."

Nilsson biographer Alyn Shipton suggests that portions of the song are based on Nilsson's former dayjob as a computer programmer at a bank, while other portions are written from the point of view of his parents. Part of the lyrics mention a woman who knew a military sailor that "would pound her for a couple of days, and then he'd sail across the bubbly waves, and those were happier days." According to Pitchfork writer Mike Powell, the lyric demonstrate Nilsson's "intelligence as a writer ... The Nilsson-ness is in the phrase pound her – a contrast between sweet nostalgia and unsentimental truth."

AllMusic reviewer Matthew Greenwalk said that the lyrics illustrate a "dread of aging and facing responsibility" as Nilsson describes waking up after a wild party and "having to get on with reality – grudgingly." Aisha Harris of The New York Times wrote that the song's "bright, infectious instrumentation belies melancholy, wistful lyrics about growing older."

== Release ==
On October 11, 1971, "Gotta Get Up" was released as the B-side to Nilsson's single "Without You", a Badfinger cover that reached number one on the Billboard Pop and Adult Contemporary singles charts. Both songs were included on Nilsson Schmilsson, released in November 1971.

== Russian Doll ==
In 2019, "Gotta Get Up" was prominently featured as the "reset" song in the Netflix series Russian Doll. The song plays each time the series' protagonist Nadia (co-creator Natasha Lyonne) dies and returns to the same location – a bathroom at her 36th birthday party. Its use is similar to that of Sonny & Cher's "I Got You Babe" from the 1993 film Groundhog Day. Lyonne explained that in choosing the song she was struck by the "buoyant doomsday quality" of Nilsson's life. The cost of using the song so many times took up a significant portion of the music budget. His estate also limited how many times the song could be used.

"Gotta Get Up" experienced a surge in streams and searches after the series was released on February 1, 2019. Spotify saw a 3,300 percent increase in streams in the U.S. after the first week of the show's release. Nielsen SoundScan reported a 2,466 percent increase from 8,000 plays (with few downloads sold) to 216,000 plays (with 1,000 downloads sold).

== Personnel ==
According to the 1971 LP credits:

- Harry Nilsson – vocals, piano
- Klaus Voormann – bass
- Jim Gordon – drums
- Chris Spedding – guitar
- Richard Perry – percussion
- Henry Krein – accordion
- Jim Price – trombone, trumpet

== Use in media ==
- 1977: Sung by Davy Jones and Micky Dolenz in their 1977 stage production of Nilsson's The Point! in London at the Mermaid Theatre. An original cast recording featuring their cover of the song was also released.
- 1989: Featured in the first episode of season 1 of the dramedy Hooperman, starring John Ritter.
- 2006: Featured in the romantic comedy A Good Year, starring Russell Crowe and Marion Cotillard.
- 2011: Featured as the intro song for TV show Michael: Tuesdays and Thursdays.
- 2019: Featured in the Netflix series Russian Doll.
- 2020: Featured in the 4th episode of the 32nd season of The Simpsons: "Treehouse of Horror XXXI", during Lisa's birthday time loop.
- 2022: Featured in Episode 2 “Co-Pilot” of the CBS series So Help Me Todd.
- 2023: American Express ad.
- 2025: Featured in a scene in the film Weapons.

== Cover versions ==
- 1977: Davy Jones & Micky Dolenz, The Point – Original Cast Recording
- 2009: Marty Finkel, The Good Life
- 2014: Annie Nilsson, This Is the Town – A Tribute to Nilsson Volume 1
- 2016: Ty Segall
