= Without You (Badfinger song) =

1970 song by Badfinger

Song by Badfinger

from the album No Dice
- Released: 9 November 1970
- Recorded: 15 & 29 July 1970
- Studio: Abbey Road, London
- Length: 4:43
- Label: Apple
- Songwriters: Pete Ham, Tom Evans
- Producer: Geoff Emerick

Audio
- "Without You" on YouTube

"Without You" is a song written by Pete Ham and Tom Evans of Welsh rock group Badfinger, and first released on their 1970 album No Dice. The power ballad has been recorded by over 180 artists, and versions released as singles by Harry Nilsson (1971) and Mariah Carey (1994) became international number one hits. The Nilsson version was included in 2021's Rolling Stone's 500 Greatest Songs of All Time. Paul McCartney once described it as "the killer song of all time".

In 1972, Ham and Evans received the British Academy's Ivor Novello Award for Best Song Musically and Lyrically.

== Badfinger original ==
First recorded by the rock group Badfinger, the song was composed by two of its members. Pete Ham wrote a song originally titled "If It's Love", but it had lacked a strong chorus. At the time of writing, the band shared residence with the Mojos at 7 Park Avenue in Golders Green. One evening, in the midst of the parties, songwriting, touring, in Golders Green, Ham and his girlfriend Beverly Tucker were about to go out for the evening. But just as they were leaving Tom Evans said he had an idea for a song – Ham said, "Not tonight, I've promised Bev." But she thought he would be wondering if he had done the right thing later, if he went out. She told him, "Go into the studio, I'm fine about it..." He replied, "Your mouth is smiling, but your eyes are sad." The song Ham wrote that night was called "If it's Love" and has the verse "Well I can't forget tomorrow, when I think of all my sorrow, I had you there but then I let you go, and now it's only fair that I should let you know ... if it's love". But Ham wasn't happy with the chorus.

Evans' relationship with his future wife Marianne influenced his lyrics:

One evening he [Evans] went to her [Marianne's] friend Karen and told Karen, "She's left me. I need her back. I can't live without her." He flew to Bonn to find her – he wrote a song called "I Can't Live". Its chorus included "I can't live, if living is without you, I can't live, I can't give any more." And so the merging of the two songs, Ham and Evans created the hit [with] Ham's verse, "warm, sweet, sentimental" and Evans' chorus, "intense, dramatic, heartbreaking."

Both Ham and Evans said they did not consider the song to have much potential at the time Badfinger recorded it, and the track was slotted to close the first side of their 1970 album No Dice. Badfinger's recording of the song, which is more brusque than its successors' versions, was not released as a single in Europe or North America.

Stereogum reviewer Tom Breihan said of Badfinger's version that it "is strummy and direct, but it also sounds like a blueprint, not a final version. They could’ve turned it into a showstopping ballad, but they didn’t."

Ultimate Classic Rock critic Michael Gallucci rated it as Badfinger's 4th-best song, calling it a "quiet gem" that "hits all the right emotional notes." Classic Rock critic Rob Hughes rated it Badfinger's 6th-best song, saying it is "less saccharine and more understated [than the Nilsson and Carey versions], delivered with a genuine sense of anguish." Paul McCartney called it "the killer song of all time."

The two writers of the song, Ham and Evans, later died by suicide due to legal and financial issues. In Evans' case, it was a dispute over songwriting royalties for "Without You" that precipitated his action. Songwriting royalties had become the subject of constant legal wrangling for Evans, and in 1983, following an acrimonious argument with his bandmate Joey Molland over the royalties for the song, Evans hanged himself.

== Harry Nilsson version ==
"Without You"
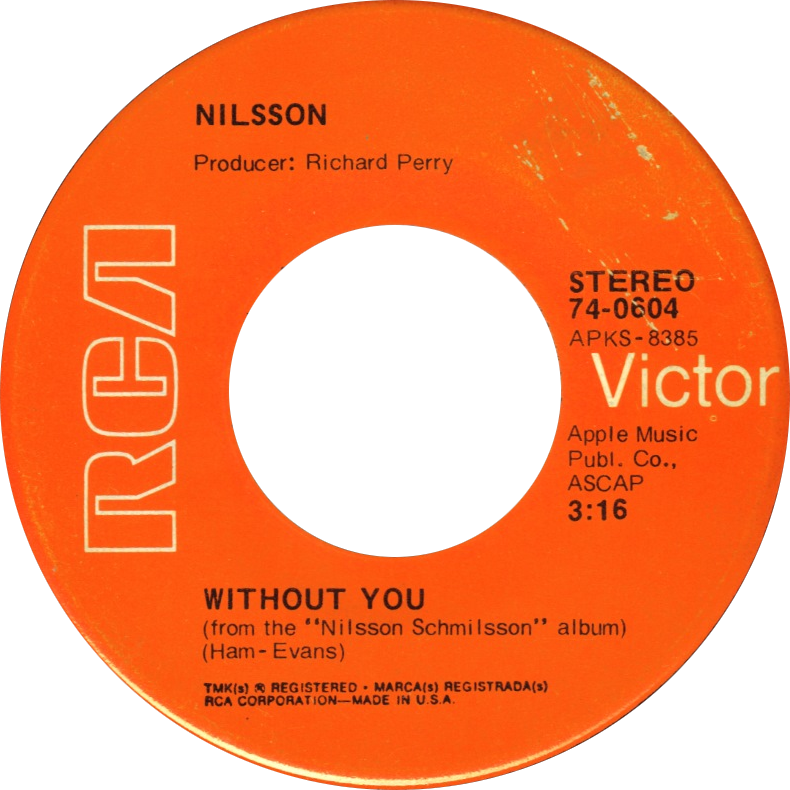
- Side A of US vinyl single

Single by Harry Nilsson

from the album Nilsson Schmilsson
- B-side: "Gotta Get Up"
- Released: 11 October 1971
- Recorded: 1971
- Studio: Island, London
- Genre: Soft rock
- Length: 3:17
- Label: RCA
- Songwriters: Pete Ham, Tom Evans
- Producer: Richard Perry

Harry Nilsson singles chronology
"Me and My Arrow" (1971)	"Without You" (1971)	"Jump into the Fire" (1972)

=== Background and history ===
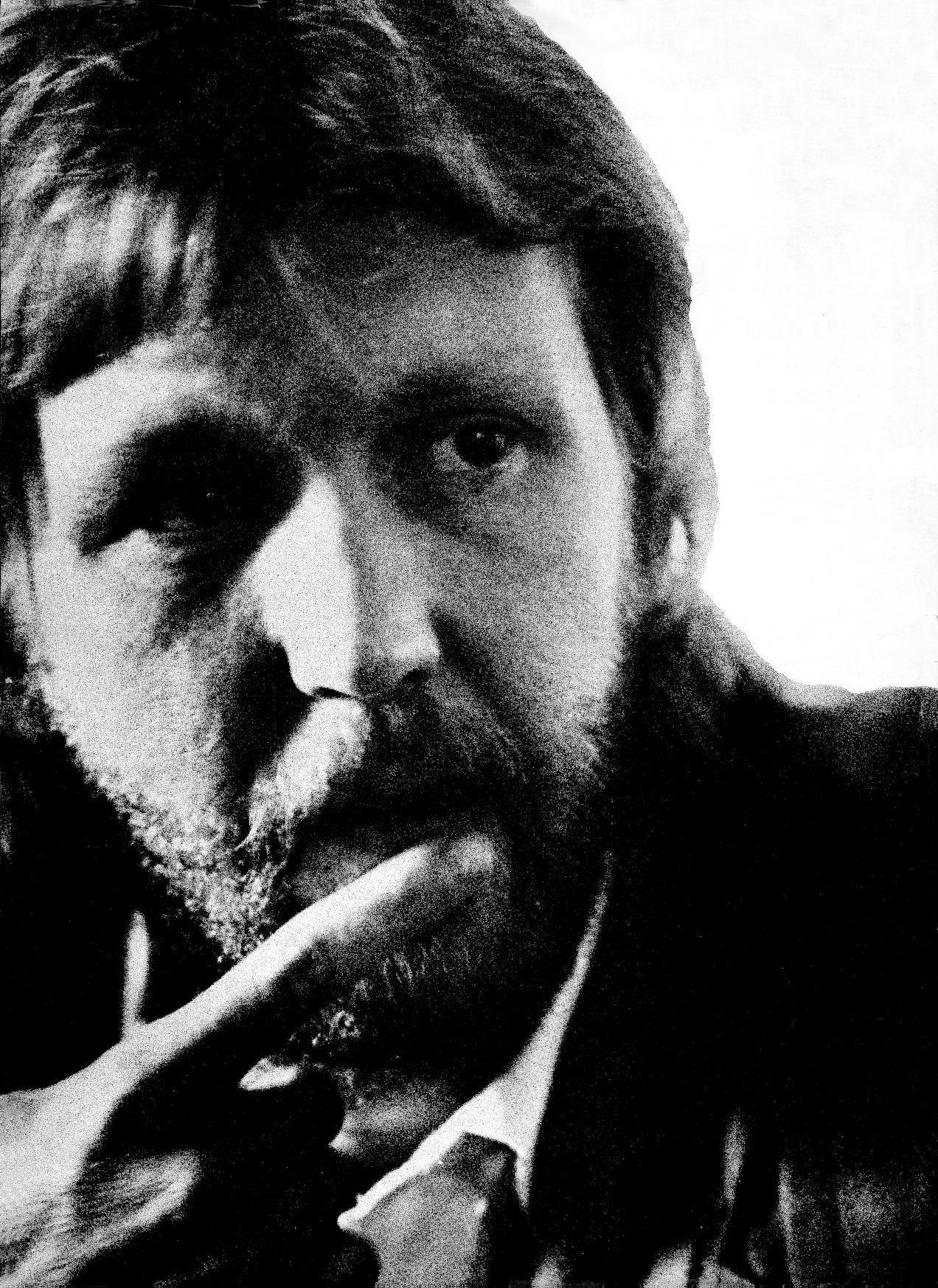
Harry Nilsson (pictured in 1972) covered Badfinger's song "Without You".

Harry Nilsson, at the time best known for his hit "Everybody's Talkin'" and for composing "One", recorded by Three Dog Night, heard Badfinger's recording of "Without You" at a party, and mistook it for a Beatles song.

After realising it was not, he decided to cover the song for his 1971 album Nilsson Schmilsson. According to Breihan, "He wanted his version of the song to be a stark, heavy solo-piano thing, but [producer Richard] Perry convinced him to turn it into a grand, crashing, theatrical monster-ballad, complete with orchestra." Gary Wright, who worked with Badfinger on George Harrison's projects, played the piano. Also featured are Klaus Voormann (bass), Jim Keltner (drums) and John Uribe (acoustic guitar). The string and horn arrangements are by Paul Buckmaster.

=== Commercial performance ===
The single was released by RCA in the autumn of 1971, and it first charted on radio stations across the US in early December. "Without You" debuted at number 99 on the Billboard Hot 100 on 18 December 1971, and on its tenth week, in the chart dated 19 February 1972, started its four-week run at number one, as his only song to peak at that position. Billboard ranked it as the number-four single of 1972. The record topped Billboard's Easy Listening chart for five weeks.

The record spent five weeks at number one on the UK singles chart, beginning on 11 March, eventually selling almost 800,000 copies. It went to number one in several other countries, including Australia (for five weeks), Ireland (two weeks) and New Zealand (two weeks).

The single was re-released in 1976 where it went back to number one in Ireland for two weeks and peaked at #22 in the UK.

=== Critical reception ===
Billboard said it was "by far [Nilsson's] most commercial driving rock ballad in some time." Cashbox said of the single "Couple a winning Badfinger tune with Gary Wright's piano and Nilsson's wideranging voice, and you've got Harry's biggest hit since 'Everybody's Talkin'.'" Record World said that "Nilsson's brilliant rendition of this Badfinger song has more than enough of the stuff of which hits are made." Breihan described the song as "going-for-it schmaltz," compared with Badfinger's "vaguely embarrassed schmaltz", but basically considered it a "big and silly and down-the-middle breakup ballad."

The single, Grammy-nominated for Record of the Year, was produced by Richard Perry, who later explained, "It was a different record for its time. It was a big ballad with a heavy backbeat, and although many artists have cut songs like it since, no one was doing it then." The recording has since been considered by some to be one of the first power ballads. In 1973, the single won Nilsson the Grammy award for Best Pop Vocal Performance, Male. While Nilsson rarely gave live concerts, he did perform the song with Ringo Starr and his All-Starr Band at Caesar's Palace in Las Vegas in September 1992.

In 1972 Evans said of finding out that Nilsson had recorded the song as a single:

We were in our studios in London. We'd gone through one of those periods where things weren't going too well. This guy came in and said "Are you Badfinger? I'm Harry Nilsson. I've got this song to play for you." It was his version of "Without You." He said he was going to use it as a single. We're thinking about other songs we can lay on him. No one had recorded any of our songs until then. It had been our ambition to write songs other people would record. It's one of the most exciting things that has happened.

In 2021, this version was ranked 496th on Rolling Stone's 500 Greatest Songs of All Time. OMD frontman Andy McCluskey named Nilsson's interpretation as the song that makes him cry, adding, "His voice is so plaintive, so broken, so tearful, it's stunning."

=== Harry Nilsson track listing ===
Worldwide Single

1. "Without You" – 3:17
2. "Gotta Get Up" – 2:24

EP (Portugal)

1. "Without You" – 3:17
2. "The Moonbeam Song" – 3:18
3. "Gotta Get Up" – 2:24
4. "Jump into The Fire" – 3:32

=== Chart performance ===
==== Weekly charts ====
Chart (1971–1972)	Peak position
Australia (Kent Music Report)	1
Belgium (Ultratop 50 Flanders)	13
Canada Top Singles (RPM)	1
Canada RPM Adult Contemporary	24
Netherlands (Single Top 100)	10
France Singles Chart	46
Ireland (IRMA)	1
Italy Singles Chart	3
New Zealand (Listener)	1
Philippines Singles Chart	1
South Africa Singles Chart	2
UK Singles (Official Charts)	1
US Billboard Hot 100	1
US Adult Contemporary (Billboard)	1
West Germany (GfK)	12

==== Year-end charts ====
Chart (1972)	Rank
Australia	2
Canada Top Singles (RPM)	44
UK	4
US Billboard Hot 100	4

==== All-time charts ====
Chart (1958–2018)	Position
US Billboard Hot 100	446

=== Certifications ===
Region	Certification	Certified units/sales
United Kingdom (BPI)	Gold	400,000^{‡}
United States (RIAA)	Gold	1,000,000^{^}
^{^} Shipments figures based on certification alone.^{‡} Sales+streaming figures based on certification alone.

=== Personnel ===
According to the 1971 LP credits:

- Harry Nilsson – vocals
- Gary Wright – piano
- John Uribe – acoustic guitar
- Klaus Voormann – bass guitar
- Jim Keltner – drums
- Paul Buckmaster – string and French horn arrangements

== Mariah Carey version ==
American singer and songwriter Mariah Carey's version, based on Harry Nilsson's version rather than the Badfinger original, was released as the third single off Music Box in the first quarter of 1994. Its US release date of 21 January 1994 by Columbia Records fell a week after Nilsson's death following a heart attack on 15 January 1994. In the US "Without You" was promoted as a double A-side with "Never Forget You". While she had heard Nilsson's version as a very young girl, Carey's decision to remake his hit was based on a chance hearing during the recording of Music Box: "I heard that song in a restaurant and just knew it would be a huge international hit" recalls Carey. Carey's version has been considered very popular on talent shows. "Without You" was later included on some non-US pressings of her compilation albums #1's (1998) and #1 to Infinity (2015), and her 2001 compilation, Greatest Hits. "Without You" was also included on her 2008 compilation The Ballads.

"Without You" reached number three on the US Billboard Hot 100 for six weeks. "Without You" remains Carey's biggest hit across Europe. In the United Kingdom, where Carey had yet to score a number one hit, "Without You" made its UK chart debut at number one where it remained for four weeks in total, and later ended as the 7th best-selling single of 1994 in the United Kingdom. It topped the European Hot 100 Singles chart for two weeks and reached number one for ten weeks in Switzerland; eight weeks in Austria and Sweden; seven weeks in Belgium; five weeks in Ireland and the Netherlands; four weeks in Germany and Iceland; and two weeks in Scotland.

== Other versions ==
- In 1975: Ruby Winters – U.S. R&B No. 95
- In 1977: Susie Allanson on the album A Little Love – U.S. C&W No. 77 (1979); by Heart on the album Magazine
- In 1983: Herman van Veen on the album On Broadway; T. G. Sheppard from the album Greatest Hits – U.S. C&W No. 12
- In 1991: Air Supply on the album The Earth Is... – U.S. AC No. 48
- In 2005: Daryl Hall & John Oates on the covers album Our Kind of Soul.
- In 2008: Valentina Hasan, a contestant auditioning for the Bulgarian singing competition Music Idol, interpreted the song as "Ken Lee"

== ASCAP and Ivor Novello recognition ==
On 15 May 1995, at ASCAP's twelfth annual Pop Music Awards in Beverly Hills, California, "Without You" was recognised as one of the 50 most-played songs of 1994 (due largely to Mariah Carey's recording). Discrepancies in ASCAP's books, resulting from a lawsuit against the Ham and Evans estates by their former manager, incorrectly attributed the song as being composed not only by Ham and Evans, but also by Badfinger's other bandmembers, Mike Gibbins and Joey Molland, and their former manager, Bill Collins. This designation and a lack of correction by ASCAP prompted the Ham Estate to boycott the ceremony. The song was also nominated for "Song of the Year" in London at the Ivor Novello Awards.

== See also ==
- List of Billboard Easy Listening number ones of 1972
- List of Billboard Hot 100 number ones of 1972
- List of Dutch Top 40 number-one singles of 1994
- List of number-one hits of 1994 (Austria)
- List of number-one hits of 1994 (Germany)
- List of number-one singles of 1972 (Canada)
- List of number-one singles of 1994 (Ireland)
- List of number-one singles of the 1990s (Switzerland)
- List of UK singles chart number ones of the 1970s
- List of UK singles chart number ones of the 1990s
