= Son of Schmilsson =

Studio album by Nilsson
- Released: 10 July 1972 (US); 28 July 1972 (UK)
- Recorded: March–April 1972
- Studios: Trident, Apple and CTS Studios, London, England
- Genre: Pop
- Length: 39:07
- Label: RCA Victor
- Producer: Richard Perry

Nilsson chronology
Nilsson Schmilsson (1971)	Son of Schmilsson (1972)	A Little Touch of Schmilsson in the Night (1973)

Singles from Son of Schmilsson
- 1. "Spaceman" / "Turn on Your Radio" Released: 4 September 1972 (US); 14 September 1972 (UK); 2. "Remember (Christmas)" / "The Lottery Song" Released: December 1972

Professional ratings
Review scores
Source	Rating
AllMusic	4.5/5 stars
The Austin Chronicle	4/5 stars
Christgau's Record Guide	B+
The Essential Rock Discography	6/10
MusicHound	2/5
Pitchfork Media	6.5/10
PopMatters	7/10 stars
Q	3/5 stars
The Rolling Stone Album Guide	3/5 stars

Son of Schmilsson is the eighth album by American singer Harry Nilsson, released in 1972 by RCA Records.

== Background ==
Nilsson was being pressured to produce a follow-up album similar to his 1971 breakthrough, Nilsson Schmilsson, but instead, he created a more eccentric work. The album was produced by Richard Perry and features musical contributions from former Beatles Ringo Starr and George Harrison. Other musicians on the recording include Nicky Hopkins, Klaus Voormann, Bobby Keys and Peter Frampton. Among the album's tracks are "You're Breakin' My Heart" and the US hit "Spaceman".

Most of the sessions were extensively filmed, at the request of Nilsson. The footage was to be used for a planned documentary, titled Did Somebody Drop His Mouse?, but the film was never released.

The album cover features a photograph of Nilsson (dressed as a Dracula-like vampire) taken by Michael Putland at George Harrison's home Friar Park. The album was remastered and released on CD with two bonus tracks in 2000 and with five bonus tracks in 2006.

== Track listing ==
All tracks written by Harry Nilsson except where noted.

Side one (LP)

1. "Take 54" – 4:22
2. "Remember (Christmas)"– 4:07
3. "Joy" – 3:42
4. "Turn on Your Radio" – 2:42
5. "You're Breakin' My Heart" – 3:10

Side two (LP)

6. "Spaceman" – 3:33
7. "The Lottery Song" – 2:24
8. "At My Front Door" (Ewart G. Abner, John C. Moore) – 2:46
9. "Ambush" – 5:35
10. "I'd Rather Be Dead" (Nilsson, Richard Perry) – 3:20
11. "The Most Beautiful World in the World" – 3:33

Bonus tracks (2000 reissue)

12. "Joy" (demo version: guitar) – 1:57
13. "Joy" (demo version: piano) – 0:55

Bonus tracks (2006 reissue)

12. "What's Your Sign?" (Alternate version) – 3:08
13. "Take 54" (Alternate take) – 3:39
14. "Campo de Encino" (Jimmy Webb) – 4:54
15. "Daybreak" (Single version) – 3:06
16. "It Had to Be You" (Jam session) – 2:34 (Hidden track)

== Charts ==
Chart (1972)	Peak position
Australia (Kent Music Report)	13
United States (Billboard 200)	12

== Personnel ==
- Harry Nilsson – vocals, electric piano (1, 5, 6, 9), acoustic guitar (4)
- Nicky Hopkins – piano (1–8, 11)
- Henry Krein – accordion (10)
- Peter Frampton – electric guitar (3–5, 8, 9), acoustic guitar (6, 7)
- Chris Spedding – electric guitar (8, 9), acoustic guitar (6, 7), bouzouki (2)
- John Uribe – acoustic guitar (3, 6, 7), electric guitar (9)
- Lowell George – electric guitar (1)
- George Harrison (credited as George Harrysong) – slide guitar (5)
- Paul Keogh – guitar (11)
- Les Thatcher – guitar (11)
- Red Rhodes – pedal steel guitar (3)
- Klaus Voormann – bass guitar (1, 3–6, 8, 10, 11), saxophone (1, 5), electric guitar (7)
- Ringo Starr (credited as Richie Snare) – drums (1, 6, 8, 9, 11)
- Barry Morgan – drums (3, 5)
- Ray Cooper – percussion (3, 7, 11), congas (8), tambourine (9)
- Milt Holland – percussion (1, 7)
- Richard Perry – percussion (6, 11), arrangements (11)
- "Moxie" – bass harmonica (6)
- Bobby Keys – saxophone (1, 5, 8, 9)
- Jim Price – trumpet (1, 5, 9), trombone (9), horn arrangement (9)
- Richard Mackey – French horn (4)
- Vincent DeRosa – French horn (4)
- David Duke – French horn (4)
- The Pop Arts String Quartet – strings (2)
- The Henry Krein Quartet – rhythm section (10)
- Senior Citizens of the Stepney & Pinner Choir Club No. 6, London, England – vocals (10)
- Del Newman – string arrangements (2, 11)
- Kirby Johnson – horn arrangements (4, 11)
- Paul Buckmaster – orchestral arrangement (6)

Technical

- Ken Scott, Robin Geoffrey Cable, Phil McDonald – engineers
- Michael Putland – cover photography

== Charts ==
Album

Year	Chart	Position
1972	Billboard Pop Albums	12

Single

Year	Single	Chart	Position
1972	"Spaceman"	Billboard Pop Singles	23

== Certifications ==
Region	Certification	Certified units/sales
United States (RIAA)	Gold	500,000^{^}
^{^} Shipments figures based on certification alone.
