= Nilsson Schmilsson =

Studio album by Nilsson
- Released: November 11, 1971
- Recorded: January–June 1971
- Studios: Trident and Island, London; RCA, Hollywood
- Genres: Rock, pop
- Length: 34:48
- Label: RCA Victor
- Producer: Richard Perry

Nilsson chronology
Aerial Pandemonium Ballet (1971)	Nilsson Schmilsson (1971)	Son of Schmilsson (1972)

Singles from Nilsson Schmilsson
- 1. "Without You" / "Gotta Get Up" Released: October 11, 1971; 2. "Jump into the Fire" / "The Moonbeam Song" Released: March 1972; 3. "Coconut" / "Down" Released: June 1972

Professional ratings
Review scores
Source	Rating
AllMusic	4.5/5 stars
Blender	4/5 stars
Christgau's Record Guide	A
The Essential Rock Discography	8/10
MusicHound Rock	4/5 stars
Pitchfork	9.4/10
Rolling Stone	5/5 stars
The Rolling Stone Album Guide	4/5 stars
The Village Voice	A−

Nilsson Schmilsson is the seventh studio album by American singer Harry Nilsson, released by RCA Records on November 11, 1971. It was Nilsson's most commercially successful work, producing three of his best-known songs. Among these was the number 1 hit "Without You", written by Pete Ham and Tom Evans of the group Badfinger. The album was the first of two Nilsson albums recorded in London and produced by Richard Perry.

"Jump into the Fire" and "Coconut", both written by Nilsson, also became hits. The album performed well at the 1973 Grammy Awards, earning a nomination for Album of the Year, while "Without You" won the Grammy for Best Male Pop Vocal Performance. In 2006, Nilsson Schmilsson was ranked number 84 on Pitchfork's "Top 100 Albums of the 1970s". The album was ranked number 281 in the 2020 revision of Rolling Stone's 500 Greatest Albums of All Time list.

== Track listing ==
All tracks are written by Harry Nilsson, except where noted.

Side one
No.	Title	Writer(s)	Length
1.	"Gotta Get Up"		2:24
2.	"Driving Along"		2:02
3.	"Early in the Morning"	Leo Hickman, Louis Jordan, Dallas Bartley	2:48
4.	"The Moonbeam Song"		3:18
5.	"Down"		3:24

Side two
No.	Title	Writer(s)	Length
6.	"Without You"	Pete Ham, Tom Evans	3:17
7.	"Coconut"		3:48
8.	"Let the Good Times Roll"	Shirley Goodman, Leonard Lee	2:42
9.	"Jump into the Fire"		6:54
10.	"I'll Never Leave You"		4:11

Additional tracks (2004 edition)
No.	Title	Length
11.	"Si No Estás Tú" (Spanish version of "Without You")	3:14
12.	"How Can I Be Sure of You"	3:04
13.	"The Moonbeam Song" (Demo version)	3:30
14.	"Lamaze"	1:44
15.	"Old Forgotten Soldier" (Demo version)	2:41
16.	"Gotta Get Up" (Demo version)	2:25
17.	"Interview with Richard Perry" (Hidden track)	2:41

== Personnel ==
According to the 1971 LP credits:

- Harry Nilsson – vocals, piano (1, 5, 8, 10), Mellotron (2, 4), organ (3), electric piano (9), harmonica (8)
- Gary Wright – piano (6), organ (8)
- Henry Krein – accordion (1)
- Richard Perry – Mellotron (2), percussion (1)
- Roger Coulam – organ (5)
- Jim Webb – piano (9)
- Chris Spedding – guitar (1, 5, 8, 9)
- John Uribe – lead guitar (2, 9), acoustic guitar (2, 4, 6)
- Caleb Quaye – guitar (7)
- Ian Duck – acoustic guitar (7)
- Klaus Voormann – bass guitar (1, 5, 6, 8), rhythm guitar (2, 9), acoustic guitar (4)
- Herbie Flowers – bass guitar (2, 4, 7, 9)
- Jim Gordon – drums (1, 2, 4, 7, 9), percussion (7, 9)
- Jim Keltner – drums (5, 6, 8)
- Roger Pope – drums (7)
- Bobby Keys – saxophone (5)
- Jim Price – trumpet (1, 5), trombone (1, 5), horn arrangements (1, 5)
- Paul Buckmaster – string and horn arrangements (6)
- George Tipton – string and horn arrangements (10)

Technical

- Robin Geoffrey Cable – engineer (Trident Studios)
- Richie Schmitt – engineer (RCA Studios)
- Phill Brown – additional engineer (Island Studios)
- Acy Lehman – graphics
- Dean Torrence – photography

== Charts ==
Chart (1972)	Peak position
Australia (Kent Music Report)	2
United States (Billboard 200)	3

== Certifications ==
Region	Certification	Certified units/sales
Australia (ARIA)	Gold	20,000^{^}
United States (RIAA)	Gold	500,000^{^}
^{^} Shipments figures based on certification alone.

== Awards ==
Year	Nominee / work	Award	Result
1973 Grammy Awards	"Without You"	Grammy Award for Best Male Pop Vocal Performance	Won
1973 Grammy Awards	"Without You"	Grammy Award for Record of the Year	Nominated
1973 Grammy Awards	"Nilsson Schmilsson"	Grammy Award for Album of the Year	Nominated
1973 Grammy Awards	"Nilsson Schmilsson"	Grammy Award for Best Engineered Album, Non-Classical	Nominated
