= Michael Putland =

English photographer (1947–2019)

Michael Putland (27 May 1947 – 18 November 2019) was an English music photographer, known for photographing musicians in the 1970s.

== Biography ==
Born in 1947 just outside London, Putland took up photography at the age of 9. He was a portrait photographer and photojournalist most noted for his extensive archive of photographs of musicians and other famous subjects. His later work was more directed to photographing classical musicians, as well as fashion and travel photography.

Putland left school at 16 and began working in a photographic studio in London. From 1965 to 1967 he assisted Walter Curtin, a Time-Life photographer, with his photojournalism and commercial advertising work. After Curtin returned to his adopted home in Canada, Putland set up as a photographer in his own right, and in 1969 he and a friend rented their own photographic studio. By 1971, he was the official photographer for the British music magazine Disc & Music Echo. His first assignment for them that year was to photograph Mick Jagger in London.

== Career ==
=== The Rolling Stones ===
Already shooting regularly for British magazines like Disc and Music Echo, Putland was hired as the tour photographer for the Rolling Stones European Tour 1973 and this led to a long-term relationship with the Stones. Some of his best-selling images come from this period of close association with the band; as an example, his portrait of Bob Marley and Peter Tosh with a grinning, boyish Mick Jagger nestled between them. (Note: This photograph was previously visible here on Putland's website. Archived 2008-02-19 at the Wayback Machine)

In 1999, Genesis Publications produced a limited edition book, Pleased to Meet You, containing 400 images of the Rolling Stones by Putland. Putland was on the sets of Stones videos, including the "It's Only Rock 'n Roll (But I Like It)" shoot with the band in their sailor suits, and the tracks "Some Girls" and "Respectable"—a still from the latter was used in 2005 as the cover for Stones' Rarities 1971–2003 album. Putland also had photographed the original "Respectable" 1978 single cover. Also published are shots of Mick Taylor; a candid set of the band backstage at The New York Palladium with the McCartneys; Bianca Jagger; and an extensive number of images of the band both onstage and off during the 1970s and 1980s.

=== New York ===
Putland lived and worked in New York City from 1977 to 1984, during which period he photographed extensively for the major record labels including Capitol, WEA, PolyGram, Columbia and A&M. Whilst in New York he also started a music photo library called Retna which he was involved in running for nearly 30 years and which he sold in 2006.

=== Editorial work ===
Putland photographed Led Zeppelin. He was hired regularly to shoot magazine covers and posters for British music publications as diverse as Smash Hits (Bananarama, Wham!); Sounds (Bryan Ferry, Paul McCartney) and Q (a shoot in Brazil with the Cure, and at the other end of the pop spectrum, Wet Wet Wet). He also shot on the sets of TV shows like Top of the Pops adding the Bee Gees, Traffic, Elton John with T. Rex, The Who, Duran Duran and Elvis Costello to his archive in the 1970s and 1980s. But it was his first client, Disc and Music Echo that set him out on the varied road of music photography by giving him his very first shoot. Other images that have become iconic and were shot for Disc include David Bowie and John Lennon.

== Select album covers ==
- Son of Schmilsson – Harry Nilsson
- Rarities 1971–2003 – The Rolling Stones
- Eric Clapton's Rainbow Concert – Eric Clapton
- The Very Best of Curtis Mayfield – Curtis Mayfield
- T. Rex BBC Sessions – T. Rex
- Vintage – Rod Stewart
- Chronicles – ABBA
- High Voltage – AC/DC
- Sweet Dreams: The Anthology – Roy Buchanan
