= Jump into the Fire =

- U.S. single

Single by Nilsson

from the album Nilsson Schmilsson
- B-side: "The Moonbeam Song"
- Released: March 1972
- Recorded: 1971
- Genre: Hard rock
- Length: 3:32 (single edit); 6:54 (album version)
- Label: RCA Victor
- Songwriter: Harry Nilsson
- Producer: Richard Perry

Nilsson singles chronology
"Without You" (1971)	"Jump into the Fire" (1972)	"Coconut" (1972)

"Jump into the Fire" is a song by American singer-songwriter Harry Nilsson from his 1971 album Nilsson Schmilsson. It was also issued as the album's second single, after "Without You", and peaked at number 27 on America's Billboard Hot 100 chart and number 16 in Canada.

Written by Nilsson, the song is in the hard rock style and marked a departure from his previous work. The recording was produced by Richard Perry and includes a segment where the bass player, Herbie Flowers, audibly detunes his instrument. "Jump into the Fire" gained further recognition following its inclusion as the soundtrack to a pivotal scene in Martin Scorsese's 1990 gangster thriller Goodfellas. Nilsson performs the song in the 1974 Apple film Son of Dracula, which stars Nilsson in the lead as Count Downe. And it is featured in the 2015 film A Bigger Splash starring Ralph Fiennes and Tilda Swinton, and in episode 4 of the 2021 BBC/Netflix series The Serpent.

== Composition and recording ==
"Jump into the Fire" is a rock song written and performed in a style that music journalist Matthew Greenwald likens to the early-1970s sound of the Rolling Stones. He adds: "Lyrically, on the surface, it's a hot lovers plea; however, it could easily be taken as a plea to society as a whole. Like a lot of Nilsson's greatest songs, it works on many different levels." Stephen Thomas Erlewine describes the track as "surging hard rock", while James Parker of The Atlantic calls it "livid, dragon-bones funk". Chuck Eddy highlights its Afro-Caribbean rhythm and posits it as an early example of "disco-metal".

Nilsson recorded the song in London in 1971 for his album Nilsson Schmilsson. As with much of the material on the album, it marked a departure from his previous work, as Nilsson was keen for commercial success after years of recognition as a quality artist and songwriter. He later commented: "What do you say to a man who writes 'The Puppy Song' and then writes 'Jump into the Fire'? I really needed [to make that change], too; that was exactly what I was hoping would happen." The sessions were produced by Richard Perry, whom Nilsson acknowledged as having been instrumental in his progression.

The musicians on the basic track were Nilsson (piano), Chris Spedding (guitar), Herbie Flowers (bass) and Jim Gordon (drums). Flowers recalls that Nilsson gave only vague instructions: "lots of tom-toms, a bass riff in D major." The bass part includes a section where, following Gordon's drum solo, Flowers detunes as he plays. According to Flowers, he began loosening the bottom string "for a laugh", believing that by that point in the song, the performance would be faded out on the released recording. Overdubs on this master take included Nilsson's vocals, guitar solos by John Uribe and another rhythm guitar part by Klaus Voormann.

== Release ==
"Jump into the Fire" received substantial airplay throughout the early 1970s. After the international success of Nilsson's cover of the Badfinger ballad "Without You", the song was a surprising choice for the second single from Nilsson Schmilsson. It was edited down from around seven minutes to three-and-a-half for this release. The single peaked at number 27 on America's Billboard Hot 100 chart, number 16 on the RPM singles chart in Canada, number 26 on Australia's Go-Set National Top 40, and number 34 in West Germany. Later in 1972, Nilsson included "Jump into the Fire" in his musical horror film Count Downe. The film was produced by Ringo Starr and later retitled Son of Dracula for its limited cinema release in 1974.

In 1990, the song was used by director Martin Scorsese as the soundtrack to a frenetic scene in his film Goodfellas, when Ray Liotta's character Henry Hill, a cocaine-addicted gangster, fears that the authorities are closing in on his illegal activities. Rolling Stone described the effect: "This is what paranoia sounds like ... the more the filmmaker fades those 'Oh oh ooohs' in and out, the more your own nerves start to fray." Sean O'Neal of The A.V. Club writes: "I have to admit, even when I play 'Jump Into The Fire' today, I keep seeing that same helicopter." Michael Gallucci of the website Ultimate Classic Rock lists "Jump into the Fire" at number 3 in his list of the ten best Nilsson songs, behind "Without You" and "Everybody's Talkin'".

== Cover versions and samples ==
In his review for AllMusic, Greenwald highlights LaVern Baker's cover of the track for the Everybody Sings Nilsson tribute album as a "hot version". The song was regularly performed as an encore by LCD Soundsystem. The band's dance adaptation of the track appears in their 2012 documentary Shut Up and Play the Hits, as well as their 2014 live album The Long Goodbye.

In 2015, "Jump into the Fire" was covered by Alice Cooper's supergroup Hollywood Vampires on their self-titled debut album. Cooper said: "Harry Nilsson was a ballad writer, so we found 'Jump into the Fire', which was actually a pretty good rock song. It was all based on drums, so we have Dave Grohl on drums." A version by Robin Zander was included on his first solo album, titled Robin Zander.

The song was covered by Chris Cornell on his 2020 album No One Sings Like You Anymore, Vol. 1.

Jim Gordon's drum solo would later be used as one of the drum tracks for The Orb's single "Little Fluffy Clouds", slowed down from 45 to 33 rpm approximately.

The song was covered by Australian singer and multi-instrumentalist Jay Watson, a co-founder of psychedelic rock/pop band Pond and touring member of Australian psychedelic rock/pop project Tame Impala, under his stage name GUM, alongside Ambrose Kenny-Smith of Australian psychedelic rock band King Gizzard and the Lizard Wizard, for their collaborative live album, Live at the Corner (2025), which was recorded live on 10 April, 2025 at the Corner Hotel in Melbourne, Victoria, Australia.

== Personnel ==
According to the 1971 Nilsson Schmilsson LP credits:

- Harry Nilsson – vocals, electric piano
- John Uribe – lead guitar
- Chris Spedding – rhythm guitar
- Klaus Voormann – rhythm guitar
- Jimmy Webb – piano
- Herbie Flowers – bass
- Jim Gordon – drums, percussion
