= Seemed Like a Good Idea at the Time (book) =

2006 book by David Goodwille

- Author: David Goodwillie
- Language: English
- Genre: Memoir
- Publisher: Algonquin Books
- Publication date: 2006

Seemed Like a Good Idea at the Time is 2006 memoir and debut book written by David Goodwillie.

== Plot ==
Author David Goodwillie's trials and tribulations of the late 1990s in the Big Apple as he fights to become a professional writer.

== Literary reviews ==
Kirkus Reviews called it "A memoir of bilious excess, related with humor and just the right amount of acidic sadness."

The Courier Journal said it was a "mesmerizing memoir and searing sketch of a decade in decline," and "[Goodwillie] conveys his wisdom via syntax that is simultaneously sobering insightful and amusing."

Converesly, Toby Young, from The Wall Street Journal wrote "There were moments in this book when I wished [Goodwillie] hadn't given up his day job."
