= Audioboxer =

EP by Something Corporate
- Released: October 2, 2001
- Genre: Pop punk
- Length: 24:57
- Label: Drive-Thru
- Producer: Jim Wirt

Something Corporate chronology
Ready... Break (2000)	Audioboxer (2001)	Leaving Through the Window (2002)

Professional ratings
Review scores
Source	Rating
AllMusic	2.5/5 stars

Audioboxer is the debut EP by American rock band Something Corporate, released on October 2, 2001 by Drive-Thru Records. "Punk Rock Princess" was released as a single the following day.

== Track listing ==
All lyrics written by Andrew McMahon, except "(Hurricane) The Formal Weather Pattern", written by Josh Partington, all music composed by Something Corporate.

Audioboxer
No.	Title	Length
1.	"(Hurricane) The Formal Weather Pattern"	3:52
2.	"iF yoU C Jordan"	4:16
3.	"Punk Rock Princess"	3:49
4.	"Bad Days"	3:38
5.	"Little"	4:52
6.	"Walking By"	4:30

== Personnel ==
Band

- Andrew McMahon - lead vocals, piano
- Josh Partington - lead guitar
- William Tell - rhythm guitar, backing vocals
- Kevin "Clutch" Page - bass
- Brian Ireland - drums, percussion

Additional Musicians

- Christopher Brady - String Arrangements
- Charlie Bisharat - violin
- Peter Kent - violin
- Darrin McCann - viola
- Steve Richards - cello

Production

- Jim Wirt - Production, Engineering and Mixing
- P.J. Smith - Assistant Engineering
- Joel Ausbrooks - Assistant Engineering
- Don Tyler - Mastering

Design

- Tim Stedman - Art Direction, Design
- Justin Stephens - Photography
- Marco Orozco - Design
