= Konstantine (song) =

Song by Something Corporate

from the album Songs for Silent Movies
- Released: 2003
- Genre: Alternative rock, emo
- Length: 9:36
- Label: Drive-Thru, MCA
- Songwriter: Andrew McMahon

"Konstantine" is a song by alternative rock band Something Corporate. It is the third track on their album Songs for Silent Movies, which was released only in Japan.

== Performance history ==
Fans of McMahon have been known to request the song while he toured with Jack's Mannequin and most recently under the moniker "Andrew McMahon in the Wilderness." In the past, McMahon refused to play the song, saying in an interview, "If I ever play it, I’ll have to play it forever, every night. If it weren’t such a big deal for me to play 'Konstantine', then I probably would play it. But the truth is, as soon as I bring that song out one time, I will never be able to walk through a venue, no matter what band I’m playing with or no matter where I’m at, and not have people chant and cheer for it.”

On August 8, 2010, during a show at the Great Plaza at Penn's Landing in Philadelphia, Something Corporate performed "Konstantine". As McMahon sat at the piano, he prefaced the upcoming song by noting that it "has flown under the radar" for years, and that its popularity is due solely to the fans' passion for it. For this reason, prior to playing the opening measures, McMahon called 'Konstantine' "a song for the people".

In apparent contradiction to his earlier interview, McMahon played "Konstantine" at every show he headlined in 2013. However, he now only plays it on one day a year: November 11.

As of August 2nd, 2022, Konstantine appears to be part of the standard set-list for the "Hello Gone Days" tour.

Something Corporate is back together as of 2024 and on their Out of Office tour. Konstantine is part of the standard set list, usually performed during the encore.

== Reference to other media ==
The line "It's to Jimmy Eat World and those nights in my car when the 'first star you see may not be a star.' I'm not your star" is a direct reference to lyrics from the song "For Me This is Heaven" from Jimmy Eat World's 1999 album Clarity.

== Referenced in other media ==
Chicago pop punk band Real Friends references the song in two of their own songs: "I Think I'm Moving Forward" and “When You Were Here.”

It is also referenced in the songs "Poetically Pathetic" by the American pop punk band Amber Pacific and "Success Story" by Holiday Parade.

Poet Hanif Abdurraqib references the song in the opening lines of his poem, "Ok, I'm Finally Ready To Say Sorry For That One Summer" from his collection, The Crown Ain't Worth Much.
