= Seemed Like a Good Idea at the Time (song) =

Song by The Darkness

from the album One Way Ticket to Hell... and Back
- Released: 2005
- Recorded: 2005
- Genre: Hard rock
- Length: 3:34
- Label: Atlantic
- Songwriter(s): Justing Hawkins, Dan Hawkins, Frankie Poullain
- Producer(s): Roy Thomas Baker

"Seemed Like a Good Idea at the Time" is a song by the English rock band The Darkness.

== Origin and recording ==
The song is about a man regretting a decision that lead to the demise of a previous romantic relationship.musicOMH called it an introspective laced with regret It is the fifth track in the band's sophomore album One Way Ticket to Hell... and Back and it was recorded at Chapel Studios, South Thoresby, Lincolnshire; Paul Smith Music Studios, London.

== Release history ==
The song has been released in three different albums:

On 28 November 2005 on the band's second album One Way Ticket to Hell... and Back.

On 1 April 2008 in the first compilation album "The Platinum Collection".

On 4 August 2008 in the second compilation album "2 in 1: Permission to Land/One Way Ticket to Hell".

== Critical reception ==
AllMusic criticized the song saying that it sounds too much like stale Meat Loaf.

Pitchfork Media commented that Baker makes like Michael Kamen in conducting orchestral embellishments to Seemed Like a Good Idea at the Time or Blind Man, but nothing hits the November Rain epic heights the band so desperately wants to reach.

musicOMH commented that "Seemed Like A Good Idea At The Time is an introspective laced with regret and an overdone string section."

Drowned in Sound stated It seemed like a good idea at the time. Good title, admittedly. Whereas _‘Seemed Like A Good Idea at the Time’_ is Hell's ‘Love Is Only A Feeling’ and therefore nothing new and perhaps not a good idea at the time.

== Personnel ==
- Justin Hawkins – vocals, lead and rhythm guitar, synthesizer, piano
- Dan Hawkins – rhythm and bass guitars
- Ed Graham – drums
