= River City High =

American rock band

- Origin: Richmond, Virginia, U.S.
- Genres: Hard rock, emo, punk rock, pop punk
- Years active: 1999 – Present
- Labels: Takeover Records; Big Wheel Recreation; Doghouse Records
- Members: James Menefee; Mark Avery; Chip Cosby; Gregg Brooks
- Website: rivercityhigh.com

River City High is an American rock band from Richmond, Virginia, United States. Like many Richmond punk bands, they incorporate other influences into their music, specifically classic rock. They formed out of the bands Fun Size and Inquisition, the latter also including members who would form Strike Anywhere and Ann Beretta.

They released their debut EP in 2000 on Big Wheel Recreation, and quickly signed to Doghouse Records thereafter. For the next three years the group toured the United States, playing over 200 shows a year. They signed a contract with MCA Records but the company folded in 2003 before they could release the material they had recorded for the label. Following some lineup changes, the group returned to Doghouse, and won the 2004 MTV Dew Circuit Breakout contest.

== Members ==
Current

- James Menefee - bass and lead vocals
- Mark Avery - guitar
- Chip Cosby - guitar
- Gregg Brooks - drums

Former

- Pedro Aida
- Greg Butler
- Johnathan Sullivan
- Cam DiNunzio
- Bobby "Raw" Anderson
- Zac Clark
- Jay McMillan
- Curtis Patton
- Allen Skillman

== Discography ==
- Richmond Motel [EP] CD (Big Wheel Recreation, 2000)
- Forgets Their Manners EP CD (Doghouse Records, 2001)
- Won't Turn Down CD (Doghouse Records/Big Wheel Recreation, 2001)
- Extended Play EP CD (Doghouse Records, 2004)
- Not Enough Saturday Nights CD (Takeover Records, 2006)
