= Astrud Gilberto discography =

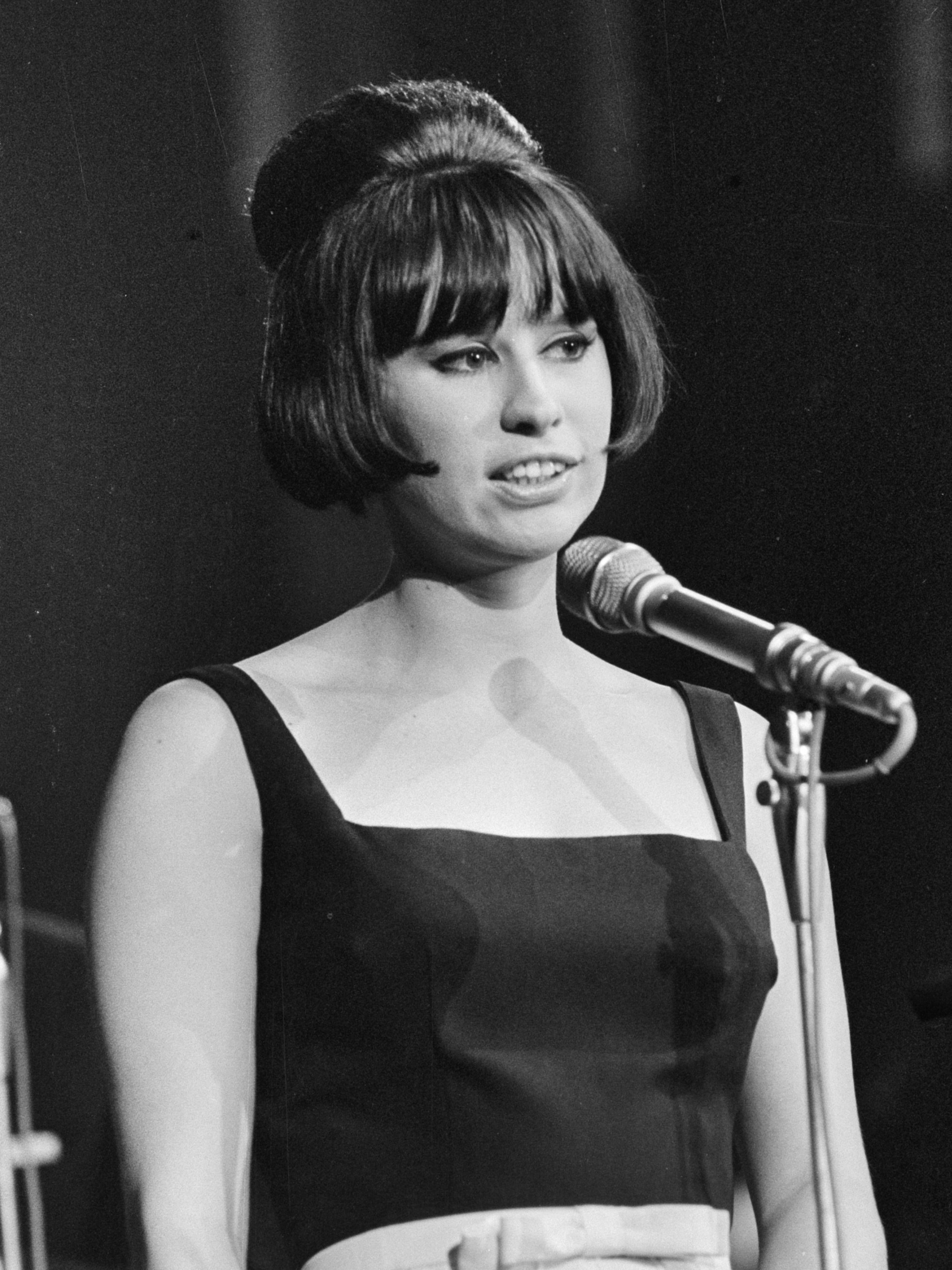
- Gilberto in 1966
- Studio albums: 16
- Soundtrack albums: 3
- Live albums: 2
- Compilation albums: 16
- Singles: 16
- Video albums: 1
- Various artist compilations: 4
- Promotional: 2
- Remix: 4

Astrud Gilberto, was a Brazilian samba and bossa nova singer and songwriter. Her discography consists of sixteen studio albums and two live albums on Verve Records, CTI Records, Perception Records, Audio Fidelity Records, Denon Records, Polygram Records, Pony Canyon and Magya Productions, as well as one music DVD on Coqueiro Verde Records.

== Discography ==
=== Albums ===
Rel.	Title	Rec.	Label	Formats	Peak chart positions			Notes
Rel.	Title	Rec.	Label	Formats	NED	US	US Jazz	Notes
1964	Getz Au Go Go	1964	Verve Records	LP, CD	—	24	—	with The New Stan Getz Quartet; Live album
1965	The Astrud Gilberto Album	1965	Verve Records	LP, CD, SACD	—	41	—	First solo album SACD was released in 2011 in Japan
1965	The Shadow of Your Smile	1965	Verve Records	LP, CD	—	66	—	-
1966	Look to the Rainbow	1966	Verve Records	LP, CD	—	—	—	-
1967	A Certain Smile, a Certain Sadness	1966	Verve Records	LP, CD	—	—	—	with Walter Wanderley
1967	Beach Samba	1967	Verve Records	LP, CD	—	—	—	One of 1001 Albums You; Must Hear Before You Die
1968	Windy	1968	Verve Records	LP, CD	—	—	—	-
1969	I Haven't Got Anything Better to Do	1969	Verve Records	LP, CD	—	—	—	-
1970	September 17, 1969	1969	Verve Records	LP, CD	—	—	—	-
1971	Gilberto with Turrentine	1971	CTI Records	LP, CD	—	—	16	with Stanley Turrentine
1972	Now	1972	Perception Records	LP, CD, DVD-A	—	—	—	Released on DVD-Audio by Silverline Records in 2002
1977	That Girl from Ipanema	1977	Audio Fidelity Records	LP, CD	—	—	—	-
1987	Astrud Gilberto Plus James Last Orchestra	1987	Polygram Records	LP, CD	42	—	—	with James Last Orchestra
1996	Live in New York	1989	Pony Canyon	CD	—	—	—	Live album Released only in Asia
1997	Temperance	1997	Pony Canyon	CD	—	—	—	Released only in Asia
2002	Jungle	2002	Magya Productions	CD	—	—	—	Available only on official site
"—" denotes items which did not chart in that country.

=== Compilations ===
Rel.	Title	Label	Formats	Peak chart positions				Notes	
Rel.	Title	Label	Formats	EU Jazz	US Jazz	UK	UK Jazz	Notes	
1966	The Girl from Ipanema	Polydor Records	LP	—	—	—	—	Released in Germany	
1968	Canta in Italiano	Verve Records	LP	—	—	—	—	Italian album Released only in Italy and Japan	
1969	Gilberto Golden Japanese Album	Verve Records	LP, CD	—	—	—	—	Japanese album Released only in Japan	
1971	The Very Best of Astrud Gilberto	Verve Records	LP	—	—	—	—	-	
1982	The Best of Astrud Gilberto	Polydor Records	LP	—	—	—	—	Released in Netherlands	
1984	The Essential Astrud Gilberto	Verve Records	LP	—	—	—	—	Released in the UK	
1985	The Best of Astrud Gilberto Vol. 2	Verve Records	LP	—	—	—	—	Released in Netherlands	
19??	Brazilian Mood	Metro Records	LP	—	—	—	—	-	
1985	This Is Astrud Gilberto	Verve Records	LP, CD	—	—	—	—	-	
1987	Compact Jazz (Astrud Gilberto)	Verve Records	CD	19	—	—	—	-	
1991	The Silver Collection (Astrud Gilberto)	Verve Records	CD	—	—	—	—	-	
1994	Verve Jazz Masters 9	Verve Records	CD	—	—	—	—	-	
1996	Jazz 'Round Midnight^{b}	Verve Records	CD	—	—	—	—	-	
1998	Talkin' Verve	Verve Records	CD	—	—	—	—	-	
2001	Astrud Gilberto's Finest Hour^{b}	Verve Records	CD	—	22	—	—	-	
2003	The Diva Series (Astrud Gilberto)	Verve Records	CD	—	—	—	—	-	
2003	The Genius of Astrud Gilberto	Verve Records	2-CD	—	—	—	22	-	
2004	Astrud for Lovers	Verve Records	CD	—	—	—	—	-	
2005	The Best of Astrud Gilberto: 20th Century Masters - The Millennium Collection	Verve Records	CD	—	—	—	—	-	
2006	The Very Best of Astrud Gilberto	Verve Records	CD	—	—	76	3	-	
2006	Non-Stop to Brazil	Verve Records	LP, CD	—	—	—	—	Europe only Was released on LP in 2008	
2008	Gold	Verve Records	2-CD	—	—	—	—	-	
2023	Great Women of Song (Astrud Gilberto)	Verve Records	CD	—	—	—	—	-	"—" denotes items which did not chart in that country.

^a Compilations containing previously unreleased material.
^b Compilations containing material previously unreleased on CD.

=== Singles ===
Year	Title	From the album	Label	Formats	Peak chart positions							Notes
Year	Title	From the album	Label	Formats	BRA	BEL	PHI	US	US AC	UK	UK Disco	Notes
1963	"The Girl from Ipanema" b/w "Corcovado"	Getz/Gilberto	Verve Records	7"	2	33	1	5	1	—	—	Grammy Award for Record of the Year in 1965 ("The Girl from Ipanema")
1967	"Stay" b/w "I Had the Craziest Dream"	Beach Samba	Verve Records	7"	—	—	—	—	31	—	—	
1969	"Windy" b/w "Never My Love"	Windy	Verve Records	7"	—	—	5	—	—	—	—	
1971	"The Shadow of Your Smile" b/w Trains and Boats and Planes	The Shadow of Your Smile / I Haven't Got Anything Better to Do	Verve Records	7"	—	—	—	—	—	—	—	Spanish single (other countries?)
1971	"Argomenti" b/w "Una Donna Che Ti Ama"	Gli Scassinatori (soundtrack)	CTI Records	7"	—	—	—	—	—	—	—	Italian single, it wasn't included in the original soundtrack LP. Was released only on reissued compilation in 1999.
1971	"Astrud Gilberto Canta en Castellano: Historia de Amor (Love Story)" b/w "Solo el Fin"	Gilberto with Turrentine	CTI Records	7"	—	—	—	—	—	—	—	Spanish single
1972	"Astrud Gilberto Canta Los Temas Originales Del Film "El Furor De La Codicia" (Le Casse): Acercándome a ti" b/w "En tu piel"	-	Acción (Spanish label)	7"	—	—	—	—	—	—	—	Gli Scassinatori Italian single, sung in Spanish
197?	"Where Do I Begin (Love Story)" b/w "Where There's a Heartache (Must Be a Heart)"	Gilberto with Turrentine	CTI Records	7"	—	—	—	—	—	—	—	Soundtrack from the movie Love Story, "Where Do I Begin" is the English version of "Historia de Amor (Love Story)" from the Gilberto with Turrentine album.
1977	"The Girl From Ipanema"	That Girl from Ipanema	Image Records	7"	—	—	—	—	—	55	17	European single
2001	"If Not for You"	-	Wah Wah Records	7" promo	—	—	—	—	—	—	—	Released on white 7" vinyl The Pinker Tones' "If Not for You" on B-side
2010	"The Girl from Ipanema (Performed Live on the Ed Sullivan Show / 1970)"	-	SOFA Entertainment, Inc.	DL	—	—	—	—	—	—	—	Recorded live in 1970
"—" denotes items which did not chart in that country.

=== Extended plays ===
Rel.	Title	Label	Formats	Notes
19??	Portuguese Washerwoman / Wish Me a Rainbow / Don't Go Breaking My Heart / A Certain Smile	Verve Records	7"	Released in France
19??	Once I Loved / Berimbou / Photograph / And Roses and Roses	Verve Records	7"	Released in France
2006	To Go: Stick It in Your Ear	Verve Records	CD	-

=== Guest appearances ===
Rel.	Performer	Title	Rec.	Role	Song title	Label	Formats	Notes
1964	Stan Getz & Joao Gilberto	Getz/Gilberto	1963	Lead vocals	* The Girl From Ipanema * Corcovado * The Girl from Ipanema (45 RPM Issue) * Corcovado (45 RPM Issue)	Verve Records	LP, CD, SACD	Awards^{c}
1982	Shigeharu Mukai & Astrud Gilberto	So & So - Mukai Meets Gilberto	1982	Lead vocals	* Champagne & Caviar * Nós Dois * Hold Me	Denon Records	LP, CD	-
1983	Michael Franks	Passionfruit	1983	Backing vocals	* Amazon	Warner Bros. Records	LP, CD	-
1984	Stan Getz	The Girl from Ipanema - The Bossa Nova Years^{d}	1964	Lead vocals	* Eu e Voce * Corcovado * The Girl from Ipanema	Verve Records	5xLP, 4xCD	-
1993	Stan Getz, Joao Gilberto	Getz/Gilberto #2 (Live At Carnegie Hall)^{d}	1964	Lead vocals	* It Might as Well Be Spring * Only Trust Your Heart * Corcovado * Garota de Ipanema * Eu e Voce	Verve Records	CD	Released as bonus tracks only on cd
1996	Étienne Daho	Eden	1996	Duet	* Les Bords de Seine	Virgin Records	CD	-
1997	Étienne Daho feat. Astrud Gilberto	Les Bords de Seine	1996	Duet	* Les Bords de Seine (Oscar Niemeyer Mix) * Les Bords de Seine	Virgin Records	12", CD	On cd only album version
1998	George Michael	Ladies & Gentlemen: The Best of George Michael	1996	Duet	* Desafinado	Sony Music Entertainment	CD	-
1999	Morricone - Belmondo	Le Professionnel - Le Marginal - Le Casse	1971	Lead vocals	* Argomenti * Una Donna Che Ti Ama	DRG Records	2xCD	-

^c Awards of "Getz/Gilberto" album:

- Grammy Award for Album of the Year in 1965
- Grammy Award for Best Jazz Instrumental Album, Individual or Group in 1965
- Grammy Award for Best Engineered Album, Non-Classical in 1965
- One of 1001 Albums You Must Hear Before You Die
- Gold album

^d Stan Getz "The Girl From Ipanema - The Bossa Nova Years" and Stan Getz, Joao Gilberto "Getz/Gilberto #2 (Live At Carnegie Hall)" recorded in the same concert. The first release contain only 3 tracks which were released both on vinyl and on cd; the second release contain five tracks which were released only on cd; that's why both releases are presented.

=== Various artists compilations ===
Rel.	Title	Label	Formats	Song title	Notes
1995	Heirs to Jobim^{e}	BMG Victor (Japan)	CD	* Forever Green	Released only on Japanese edition
1996	Red Hot + Rio^{e}	Verve Records	2xLP, CD	* Desafinado (Off Key)	with George Michael
2003	Bossa Nova for Lovers	Verve Records	CD	* The Shadow Of Your Smile * My Foolish Heart * Misty Roses * So Nice (Summer Samba) (with Walter Wanderley) * Dindi * Meditation	Various artists compilation
2007	Dimitri From Paris; Presents Cocktail Disco^{f}	-	2xCD	* The Girl From Ipanema (12" Version)	Released for the first time on cd

^e Compilations containing previously unreleased material.
^f Compilations containing previously unreleased on CD material.

=== Original recordings for motion picture soundtracks ===
Rel.	OST title	Song title	Rec.	Label	Formats	Notes
1964	Get Yourself a College Girl	* The Girl from Ipanema (Movie version)	1964	MGM Records	LP, CD	with Stan Getz
1965	The Deadly Affair	*"Who Needs Forever"	1965	Verve Records	LP, CD	-
—	Le casse (Wasn't included)	* Argomenti * Una Donna Che Ti Ama	1971	CTI Records	—	Wasn't included in the original soundtrack LP. Was released only on reissued compilation in 1999.

=== Recordings for promotion ===
Rel.	Performer	Title	Rec.	Label	Formats	Notes
19??	Various artists	The Sound Of Selling In The 60's	1965	-	LP	Stan Getz & Astrud Gilberto for Macleans Toothpaste
19??	Astrud Gilberto	The Music of Eastern	1965-69	Eastern Airlines	7", CD	Astrud Gilberto for Eastern Airlines

=== Unreleased songs ===
Year	Title	Notes
-	-	-
1983	Let Yourself Go	Recorded on October 28, 1983, at the Opera House, Cork, Ireland

=== Remixed ===
Rel.	Performer	Album title	Track titles	Label	Formats	Track #
Verve remixed
2002	Various artists	Verve Remixed	Who Needs Forever? (Thievery Corporation Remix)	Verve Records	3xLP, CD	B1 / 3
2003	Various artists	Verve Remixed 2	Here's That Rainy Day (Koop Remix)	Verve Records	3xLP, CD	F2 / 13
2005	Various artists	Verve Remixed 3	The Gentle Rain (RJD2 Remix)	Verve Records	3xLP, CD	D1 / 7
2008	Various artists	Verve Remixed 4	Bim Bom (Psapp Remix)	Verve Records	2xLP, CD	B3 / 6
2013	Various artists	Verve Remixed: The First Ladies	Fly Me To The Moon (Kaskade Remix)	Verve Records	2XLP, CD	A2 / 2
Mixed
2006	Cut Chemist	The Audience's Listening	The Garden	Warner Bros. Records	2xLP, CD	A4 / 4
Sampled
2005	The Black; Eyed Peas	Monkey Business	Like That	A&M Records	2xLP, CD	B2 / 6
Other edits
2004	Various artists	Angel Beach The Third Wave	Far Away In San Antonio^{g}	Orb Records	3xCD	1-14
2006	Various artists	Diamonds Dub (Tangoterje Edit); Give Me Your Love (Tangoterje Edit); Black Magic (Tangoterje Edit)	Black Magic (Tangoterje Edit)	Supreme Records	12" Vinyl	B2
2009	Various artists	ISO50 Music Exclusive (Free MP3 EP)	Berimbau (Shigeto Edit)	-	DL	1

^g Released as Eden vs Astrud Gilberto.

=== Tributes ===
Albums
Rel.	Performer	Title	Rec.	Label	Formats	Notes
1999	Mind Games	Plays the Music of Stan Getz & Astrud Gilberto	-	-	CD, SACD	with Lisa Wahlandt and Mulo Francel
Songs
Rel.	Performer	Title	Album	Label	Formats	Notes
1987	Basia	Astrud	Time and Tide	Epic Records	LP, CD	Song about Astrud Gilberto
2011	Basia	Astrud (Live)	From Newport to London (Greatest, Hits Live And More)	Entertainment One	CD	same as above

== Videography ==
=== Video albums ===
Rel.	Title	Rec.	Label	Formats	Notes
2010	Festival de Lugano 1985	1985	Coqueiro Verde Records	DVD	-

=== DVDs with Astrud Gilberto appearance ===
Rel.	Performer	Album title	Song title	Rec.	Label	Formats	Notes
2009	Various artists	Rock Legends: The Best of 50's, 60's, 70's from The Ed Sullivan Show	The Girl From Ipanema	1970	-	9xDVD	-

=== Movies with Astrud Gilberto appearance ===
Year	Title	Role	Formats	Notes
1964	Get Yourself a College Girl	Herself	DVD, VHS	-
1964	The Hanged Man	Herself	VHS	-

=== Music videos ===
Year	Title
1965	The Girl From Ipanema
1965	Água De Beber
