= Aerial Pandemonium Ballet =

Remix album by Harry Nilsson
- Released: June 1971
- Recorded: Late 1966–1968 (new vocals and remix, 1971)
- Genres: Rock, pop
- Length: 29:58
- Label: RCA Victor
- Producers: Harry Nilsson; Rick Jarrard

Harry Nilsson chronology
The Point! (1970)	Aerial Pandemonium Ballet (1971)	Nilsson Schmilsson (1971)

Professional ratings
Review scores
Source	Rating
AllMusic	4/5 stars

Aerial Pandemonium Ballet is a 1971 album by Harry Nilsson which reimagined recordings from his early albums Pandemonium Shadow Show (1967) and Aerial Ballet (1968). It is one of the first-ever remix albums.

== Background ==
With the successes of "Everybody's Talkin'" and The Point! creating demand for Nilsson recordings, a reissue of his first two RCA Victor albums (Pandemonium Shadow Show and Aerial Ballet), then out of print, was considered. Nilsson thought that his early albums already sounded somewhat dated by 1971, so he returned to the studio with the master tapes, remixed, tweaked, and re-recorded vocals, and came up with a new consolidation that he titled Aerial Pandemonium Ballet.

Aerial Pandemonium Ballet includes four songs from Pandemonium Shadow Show ("1941", "Without Her", "River Deep - Mountain High", and "Sleep Late, My Lady Friend") and eight songs from Aerial Ballet ("Daddy's Song", "Good Old Desk", "Don't Leave Me", "Mr. Richland's Favorite Song", "Together", "Everybody's Talkin'", "One", and "Bath").

The songs from Pandemonium Shadow Show not included in Aerial Pandemonium Ballet are "Ten Little Indians", "Cuddly Toy", "She Sang Hymns Out of Tune", "You Can't Do That", "She's Leaving Home", "There Will Never Be", "Freckles", and "It's Been So Long". The songs from Aerial Ballet not included in Aerial Pandemonium Ballet are "Little Cowboy", "I Said Goodbye to Me", "Little Cowboy (Reprise)", "Mr. Tinker", and "The Wailing of the Willow".

== Reception ==
Robert Adels of the Philadelphia Daily News stated that the album was "the most sensitive stuff he's ever recorded." The Richmond Review called the album "lively".

A less positive contemporary notice came from John Laycock of the Windsor Star, who stated that while "Everybody's Talkin'" and "1941" didn't "need any help", "nothing could save some of the others" and "If nothing else, this patchwork shows how wise he's been to stick to wit and whimsy in his more recent stuff.” More recently, Stephen Thomas Erlewine on allmusic.com describes the result as "just old tunes presented in slightly new, slightly off-putting ways."

== Track listing ==
All music and lyrics by Harry Nilsson except where noted

1. Introduction – 0:09
2. "1941" – 2:37 (Slowed down track & remixed)
3. "Daddy's Song" – 2:07 (New vocals, guitar/piano/out of sync)
4. "Mr. Richland's Favorite Song" – 2:07 (New background vocals & remixed)
5. "Good Old Desk" – 2:30 (Slowed down track & remixed)
6. "Everybody's Talkin'" (Fred Neil) – 2:42 (Dumped second voice & remixed)
7. "Bath" – 1:50 (New Vocals & Re-EQ'd original track)
8. "River Deep – Mountain High" (Phil Spector, Jeff Barry, Ellie Greenwich) – 3:57 (New vocals & remixed)
9. "Sleep Late, My Lady Friend" – 2:37 (Remixed)
10. "Don't Leave Me" – 2:12 (Remixed)
11. "Without Her" – 2:08 (New vocals & remixed)
12. "Together" – 1:37 (New vocals, edited out bridge & remixed)
13. "One" – 2:18 (Remixed and significantly edited - the original was 2:50)
14. Closing – 0:20
