= Canta en Italiano =

Canta in Italiano (Italian) or Canta en Italiano (Spanish), meaning 'Sings in Italian', may refer to:

- Canta en Italiano (Gene Pitney EP), 1965
- Canta in Italiano (Astrud Gilberto album), 1968
- Canta in Italiano (Dalida album), 1969
- Canta en Italiano (Daniela Romo EP), 1983
- Canta en Italiano, 1985 album by Luis Miguel
