= Canta in Italiano (Astrud Gilberto album) =

Canta In Italiano

Studio album by Astrud Gilberto
- Released: 1968
- Genre: Bossa nova
- Label: Verve

Astrud Gilberto chronology
Windy (1968)	Canta In Italiano (1968)	September 17, 1969 (1969)

Canta In Italiano is a 1968 album by Astrud Gilberto. The most promoted track was an Italian version of "Goodbye Sadness" by Alberto Testa, the theme of a Brazilian telenovela.

== Track listing ==
1. Tristezza Per Favore Va Via (Goodbye Sadness) – 3:30
2. Castelli Di Sabbia (The Shadow of Your Smile) – 2:27
3. Aruanda – 2:16
4. Tristezza – 2:15
5. Gli Occhi Miei – 2:57
6. Malinconia (Manhã de Carnaval) – 1:53
7. La Banda – 3:00
8. Miro In Alto ... Voglio Te (I Had the Craziest Dream) – 2:17
9. Dammi Un'Idea (Summer Samba) – 2:37
10. Tu Non Mi Guardi Più (A Certain Sadness) – 3:07
11. Portami Con Te (Fly Me to the Moon) – 2:17
12. Un Milione, Un Miliardo – 2:12
