= Água de Beber =

Song by Antônio Carlos Jobim

from the album The Composer of Desafinado, Plays
- Language: Portuguese
- English title: "Water to Drink"
- Released: 1963
- Genre: Bossa nova
- Length: 2:50
- Label: Verve
- Composer: Antônio Carlos Jobim
- Lyricist: Vinicius de Moraes
- Producer: Creed Taylor

The Composer of Desafinado, Plays track listing
- 12 tracks: 1. "The Girl from Ipanema"; 2. "O Amor em Paz"; 3. "Água de Beber"; 4. "Vivo Sonhando"; 5. "O Morro Não Tem Vez"; 6. "Insensatez"; 7. "Corcovado"; 8. "One Note Samba"; 9. "Meditation"; 10. "Só Danço Samba (Jazz Samba)"; 11. "Chega de Saudade"; 12. "Desafinado"

Official audio
- "Água de Beber" on YouTube

"Água de Beber" ("Water to Drink") is a bossa nova and jazz standard composed by Antônio Carlos Jobim and originally recorded in the key of A minor, with lyrics written by Vinícius de Moraes. The English lyrics were written by Norman Gimbel.

The story is, as told by Kléber Farias, one of the engineers who helped build Brasília: In 1959, when the new capital was being built, the President of Brazil, Juscelino Kubitschek, invited Antônio Carlos "Tom" Jobim and Vinícius de Moraes to spend a season at Catetinho (the provisional presidential palace, made of wood) to compose a symphony that would be performed at the inauguration of Brasília.

One evening, Vinícius and Tom were walking near the wooden palace when they heard the noise of the water. They asked the watchman, "But what is that noise of water here?" The watchman replied, "Você não sabe não? É aqui que tem água de beber, camará." [Don't you know? This is where you have drinking water, buddy boy.]

At that moment, they learnt both the source of water and inspiration for the first song composed in Brasília. Kléber was one of the first to hear the song, sung by Tom and Vinícius at the city's only hotel, hours after composing it.

== Melody ==
Melody of Água de Beber

== Recordings ==
- Vinícius de Moraes - (Phillips, 78 rpm) (1961)
- Maysa - Canção do Amor mais Triste (1962)
- Antônio Carlos Jobim - The Composer of Desafinado, Plays (1963) and The Wonderful World of Antonio Carlos Jobim (1965)
- Astrud Gilberto (with Jobim) - The Astrud Gilberto Album (1965)
- La Lupe (with Tito Puente) - Tú y Yo (1965)
- Sérgio Mendes - Herb Alpert Presents Sergio Mendes & Brasil '66 (1966)
- Juan García Esquivel - The Genius of Esquivel (1967)
- Frank Sinatra (with Jobim) - Sinatra & Company (1969)
- Ella Fitzgerald - Ella Abraça Jobim (1981), and Ella A Nice, Pablo, (1971)
- Astrud Gilberto - Astrud Gilberto Plus James Last Orchestra (1986)
- Joseph Portes (merengue rhythm) - Agua de beber (1988)
- Eliane Elias - Eliane Elias Plays Jobim (1989)
- Quarteto em Cy – "Vinicius em Cy" (1993)
- Lee Ritenour - A Twist of Jobim (1997): (Various artists)
- Charlie Byrd - My Inspiration: Music of Brazil (1999)
- Quarteto Jobim Morelenbaum - Quarteto Jobim Morelenbaum (2000)
- Bet.e & Stef - Jazz/Bossa Nova (2002)
- Sophie Milman - Sophie Milman (2004)
- Meja - Mellow (2004)
- Ana Paula Lopes - Meu (2005)
- Tania Maria - Intimidade (2005)
- David Benoit - Full Circle (2006)
- Lisa Ono - Águas de Março - O Melhor da Bossa Nova (2010)
- Bernie Worrell - Standards (2011)

== See also ==
- List of bossa nova standards
