= Pandemonium Shadow Show =

Studio album by Nilsson
- Released: 20 December 1967
- Studio: RCA's Music Center of the World, Hollywood, California
- Genre: Orchestral pop; psychedelic pop; pop rock
- Length: 31:14
- Label: RCA Victor
- Producer: Rick Jarrard

Nilsson chronology
Spotlight on Nilsson (1966)	Pandemonium Shadow Show (1967)	Aerial Ballet (1968)

Singles from Pandemonium Shadow Show
- 1. "Without Her" / "Freckles" Released: May 1967; 2. "You Can't Do That" / "Ten Little Indians" Released: August 1967; 3. "River Deep – Mountain High" / "She Sang Hymns Out of Tune" Released: November 1967

Professional ratings
Review scores
Source	Rating
AllMusic	4.5/5 stars
The Essential Rock Discography	6/10

Pandemonium Shadow Show is the second studio album by American singer-songwriter Harry Nilsson, released in December 1967 on RCA Victor.

== Background ==
The album was the first product of Nilsson's three-year, $50,000 recording contract with RCA Victor, and was recorded in their Hollywood studio. Unlike virtually all his earlier records, Show employed the full potential of Nilsson's voice in the recording studio, turning him into what was described as a "chorus of ninety-eight voices".

Nilsson had hoped to use the title Something Wicked This Way Comes, and had asked sci-fi author Ray Bradbury for permission. But approval hadn't come by the release date, so the lesser-known title was chosen (of a circus sideshow appearing in Bradbury's novel) instead.

As well as original songs by Nilsson, a number of covers were included on the album, including one by Phil Spector (who had earlier co-written a song with Nilsson), Jeff Barry and Ellie Greenwich, "River Deep – Mountain High", and two by the Beatles; "She's Leaving Home" and "You Can't Do That", the latter in an arrangement that quoted lyrics from 17 other Beatles songs. Three other songs were written by Jesse Lee Kincaid, Botkin and Garfield, and Cliff Hess, Howard Johnson and Milton Ager.

The album debuted to little public attention in the US or the UK, although it was an immediate hit in Canada, where "You Can't Do That" was a top 10 hit. Beatles publicist Derek Taylor heard "1941" on his car radio waiting for his wife at the supermarket and, enjoying the track, ordered a case of copies, sending them out to various industry people he believed would be interested, including the Beatles, who later invited Nilsson to London and helped further his career.

A cover of "1941" by Canadian folk rock artist Tom Northcott charted in both Canada and the US in 1968; in the same period the singer-songwriter Edoardo Bennato also covered it, with text translated into Italian.

Fellow musician and earlier collaborator Chip Douglas introduced Nilsson to the Monkees whom he was producing. Nilsson gave an impromptu audition of his latest songs. The Monkees covered two of his songs – "Cuddly Toy" (which appeared on their fourth album), and later "Daddy's Song" (which appeared on Head) – as well as becoming friends.

"Without Her" was covered by Blood, Sweat and Tears on Child Is Father to the Man, by Herb Alpert & the Tijuana Brass on the album Warm, and by the supergroup Beckley-Lamm-Wilson on their album Like a Brother.

Nilsson's early work sold better after he had become better established through hits like "Without You" and albums like Nilsson Schmilsson. Nilsson revamped several tracks from his first two albums to produce one of the first remix albums, Aerial Pandemonium Ballet, in 1971.

== Track listing ==
All tracks are written by Harry Nilsson; except where indicated.

Side one
No.	Title	Writer(s)	Length
1.	"Ten Little Indians"		2:13
2.	"1941"		2:36
3.	"Cuddly Toy"		2:45
4.	"She Sang Hymns Out of Tune"	Jesse Lee Kincaid	2:19
5.	"You Can't Do That"	John Lennon, Paul McCartney	2:16
6.	"Sleep Late, My Lady Friend"		2:41

Side two
No.	Title	Writer(s)	Length
1.	"She's Leaving Home"	Lennon, McCartney	3:16
2.	"There Will Never Be"	Perry Botkin, Jr., Gil Garfield	2:27
3.	"Without Her"		2:18
4.	"Freckles"	Cliff Hess, Howard Johnson, Milton Ager	2:21
5.	"It's Been So Long"		2:09
6.	"River Deep – Mountain High"	Phil Spector, Jeff Barry, Ellie Greenwich	3:53
Total length:			31:14

== Personnel ==
- Harry Nilsson – vocals
- Dr. John
- Lyle Ritz
- Mike Deasy
- Milt Holland
- George Tipton – arrangements
- Perry Botkin Jr. – arrangements on "Freckles" and "It's Been So Long"

Technical

- Dick Bogert – engineer
- Jeff Gold – photography
- Donald Burgess – photography montage
