= You Can't Do That =

1964 single by the Beatles

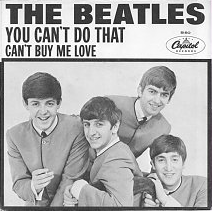
- US picture sleeve (reverse)

Single by the Beatles

from the album A Hard Day’s Night
- A-side: "Can't Buy Me Love"
- Released: 16 March 1964 (US); 20 March 1964 (UK)
- Recorded: 25 February 1964
- Studio: EMI, London
- Genre: Rock and roll, R&B
- Length: 2:33
- Label: Parlophone (UK); Capitol (US)
- Songwriter: Lennon–McCartney
- Producer: George Martin

The Beatles UK singles chronology
"I Want to Hold Your Hand" (1963)	"Can't Buy Me Love" / "You Can't Do That" (1964)	"A Hard Day's Night" (1964)

The Beatles US singles chronology
"Twist and Shout" (1964)	"Can't Buy Me Love" / "You Can't Do That" (1964)	"Love Me Do" (1964)

"You Can't Do That" is a song written by John Lennon (credited to Lennon–McCartney) and released by the English rock band the Beatles as the B-side of their sixth British single "Can't Buy Me Love". It was later released on their third UK album A Hard Day's Night (1964). A live rendition of the song was released on the 2016 re-release of The Beatles at the Hollywood Bowl.

== Composition ==
One of Lennon's semi-autobiographical songs, "You Can't Do That" "contradicted the genial tone with its tense threats, sexual paranoia and nagging, dragging groove", wrote Robert Sandall. The song's theme of jealousy was revisited in other Lennon compositions, such as "Run for Your Life" and "Jealous Guy". Influenced by the then relatively unknown Wilson Pickett, it is rooted in the twelve-bar blues form, with Lennon introducing a discordant sharp 9th (F) on the D7th chord, pointedly emphasising "…I told you before…" and then pushing this note for the exasperated "Oh!" before resolving to the song's key of G. Lennon also composed and played the guitar solo. The work reflected Lennon's love for hard-edged American R&B—"a cowbell going four in the bar and the chord going chatoong!" as he put it.

George Harrison wrote the intro and outro guitar riff in the studio, according to Tom Petty in Rolling Stone. When asked by Petty how he came up with it, Harrison recalled: "I was just standing there [in the studio] and thought, 'I've got to do something!'".

With filming due to begin on A Hard Day's Night, film director Richard Lester needed the Beatles to provide him with original material ahead of production; "You Can't Do That" was selected to be part of the Scala Theatre "live performance" scene in the film, but was dropped from the final cut along with "I'll Cry Instead" and "I Call Your Name". The recording took nine takes to complete, and was considered for the A-side of their next single until McCartney wrote "Can't Buy Me Love".

== Recording and release ==
"You Can't Do That" was recorded on Tuesday, 25 February 1964, in EMI Studios in London. An early take with a guide vocal is included on Anthology 1. It was the first song completed in the week before the Beatles began filming A Hard Day's Night, though "I Should Have Known Better" and "And I Love Her" were also started on the same day.

While in New York for The Ed Sullivan Show, guitarist George Harrison was presented with a Rickenbacker 360 Deluxe electric 12-string guitar worth $900 in 1964 ($9,300 now). Only the second one produced, it was recorded for the first time on "You Can't Do That" and gave the song its distinctive chiming sound.

The song was first released as the B-side of the "Can't Buy Me Love" single on 16 March 1964 in the United States by Capitol Records and on 20 March 1964 in the United Kingdom by Parlophone. It was the Beatles' seventh US single and sixth UK single. It was later included on the A Hard Day's Night album in the UK, and The Beatles' Second Album in the US.

The Beatles were filmed miming to "You Can't Do That" as part of the final concert sequence in the A Hard Day's Night film. The filming took place on 31 March 1964 at the Scala Theatre in London, but was not used. It was, however, broadcast on The Ed Sullivan Show on 24 May. The performance is included in the documentary The Making of "A Hard Day's Night".

The Beatles recorded "You Can't Do That" four times for BBC radio in 1964. It also became a part of the group's live repertoire that year, and was the second song in their set—after "Twist And Shout"—during their Australian and North American tours.

According to Mark Lewisohn's book The Beatles Recording Sessions, George Martin overdubbed a piano track to Take 9 on 22 May 1964, ostensibly for the album version of this song, but it was never used.

== Personnel ==
Per Ian MacDonald:

- John Lennon – lead vocal, lead and rhythm guitar
- Paul McCartney – backing vocal, bass guitar, cowbell
- George Harrison – backing vocal, 12-string lead guitar
- Ringo Starr – drums, bongos

== Nilsson version ==
"You Can't Do That"

Single by Nilsson

from the album Pandemonium Shadow Show
- B-side: "Ten Little Indians"
- Released: August 1967
- Songwriter: Lennon–McCartney

Nilsson singles chronology
"Without Her" (1967)	"You Can't Do That" (1967)	"River Deep – Mountain High" (1967)

"You Can't Do That" was covered by Harry Nilsson for his debut album Pandemonium Shadow Show (1967). Nilsson re-arranged the song making it somewhat slower. He also worked references to 18 other Beatles tunes in the mix, usually by quoting snippets of Beatles lyrics in the multi-layered backing vocals.

The recording has been credited as the first mashup song. It was Nilsson's first hit as a performer; though it stalled at #122 on the US charts, it reached the top 10 in Canada.

== Charts ==
The Beatles

Chart (1964)	Peak position
Canada RPM Top Singles	33
US Billboard Hot 100	48

Nilsson

Chart (1967)	Peak position
Canada RPM Top Singles	10
US Billboard Hot 100	122
US Cash Box Top 100	91
