= Without Her (Harry Nilsson song) =

Single by Harry Nilsson

from the album Pandemonium Shadow Show
- B-side: "Cuddly Toy"
- Released: 1967
- Recorded: 1966
- Genre: Baroque pop
- Length: 2:18
- Label: RCA Victor
- Songwriter: Harry Nilsson
- Producer: Rick Jarrard

Harry Nilsson singles chronology
"You Can't Do That" (1967)	"Without Her" (1967)	"One" (1968)

"Without Her" is a song written and recorded by American singer-songwriter Harry Nilsson, released on his 1967 album Pandemonium Shadow Show.

== Background ==
The song, a Baroque pop single, is played with cello and a countermelody performed on a flute, based on about a half dozen chords. One of Nilsson's first hits (although a minor one), it explains the sadness of dreaming each night that the woman he loves will be there but never is, and the melancholy of spending another day without her.

== Other recorded versions ==
- Jack Jones recorded a version which served as the title track of his 1967 RCA Victor Records album. "Without Her" was also the flip to his 1968 single "Follow Me".
- Also in 1967, the song was covered by singer Glen Campbell on his Gentle on My Mind album.
- In 1968, the American band Blood, Sweat & Tears covered it on their debut album, Child Is Father to the Man.
- A version by Herb Alpert appeared on the Warm album by Herb Alpert and the Tijuana Brass.
- Cilla Black recorded "Without Him" for her 1969 album Surround Yourself with Cilla
- Brazilian bossa nova singer Astrud Gilberto recorded it in 1969, for her, I Haven't Got Anything Better to Do album.
- Scottish singer Lulu covered the song as "Without Him". Lulu's version was the B-side of her 1968 single "I'm A Tiger".
- Julie London also recorded the song as "Without Him" on the last album she ever released, Yummy, Yummy, Yummy, in 1969.
- In Spanish the song was recorded by the Mexican singer José José, "Sin Ella" (Without Her), and is included on his first 1969 album Cuidado in a bossa nova version.
- Triste Janero released the song as "Without Him" on their singular album Meet Triste Janero in 1969.
- Okay Kaya covered the song on her 2021 mixtape The Incompatible Okay Kaya.
- Eddy Mitchell covered the song with French lyrics as "Un nouveau jour sur la Terre" in his 1969 album Mitchellville
