= Verve Remixed =

Verve Remixed, Volumes 1-4

Compilation album by Various Artists
- Released: 2002, 2003, 2005, 2008, 2011, 2013
- Recorded: 2002, 2003, 2005, 2008, 2011, 2013
- Genre: Jazz, blues, electronic
- Label: Verve
- Producer: Various

Verve Remixed is a series of albums released by Verve Records centered on the concept of classic Verve tracks, remixed by contemporary electronic music producers and DJs. The series has proven to be very popular, both with fans of the original recordings and with younger generations of music listeners, many of whom are exposed to the classic jazz and blues artists for the first time.

In addition to the albums that include the remixes, each volume of the series has a companion album titled Verve Unmixed, containing all of the music in its original form. The three original Verve Remixed albums are also available as a boxed set, The Complete Verve Remixed Deluxe Box, along with a bonus album, Verve Remixed Plus. A Christmas music edition of the series was released in late 2008.

== Track listings ==
=== Verve Remixed (2002) ===
| No. | Title | Original artist | Length |
|---|---|---|---|
| 1. | "Spanish Grease (Dorfmeister Con Madrid de los Austrias Muga Reserva Remix)" | Willie Bobo |
| 2. | "How Long Has This Been Going On? (MJ Cole Remix)" | Carmen McRae |
| 3. | "Who Needs Forever? (Thievery Corporation Remix)" | Astrud Gilberto |
| 4. | "Is You Is or Is You Ain't My Baby? (Rae & Christian Remix)" | Dinah Washington |
| 5. | "Feelin' Good (Joe Claussell Remix)" | Nina Simone |
| 6. | "Return to Paradise (Mark De Clive-Lowe Remix)" | Shirley Horn |
| 7. | "Wait Till You See Him (De-Phazz Remix)" | Ella Fitzgerald |
| 8. | "Don't Explain (Dzihan & Kamien Remix)" | Billie Holiday |
| 9. | "See-Line Woman (Masters at Work Remix)" | Nina Simone |
| 10. | "Summertime (UFO Remix)" | Sarah Vaughan |
| 11. | "Strange Fruit (Tricky Remix)" | Billie Holiday |
| 12. | "Hare Krishna (King Britt Funke Mix)" | Tony Scott |

=== Verve Remixed 2 (2003) ===
| No. | Title | Original artist | Length |
|---|---|---|---|
| 1. | "Manteca (The Funky Lowlives Remix)" | Dizzy Gillespie |
| 2. | "Sinnerman (Felix da Housecat's Heavenly House Remix)" | Nina Simone |
| 3. | "Whatever Lola Wants (Gotan Project Remix)" | Sarah Vaughan |
| 4. | "Brother Where Are You? (Matthew Herbert Remix)" | Oscar Brown Jr. |
| 5. | "Slap That Bass (Miguel Migs Petalpusher Remix)" | Ella Fitzgerald |
| 6. | "Blues for Brother George Jackson (Mondo Grosso Next Wave Remix)" | Archie Shepp |
| 7. | "Angel Eyes (Layo & Bushwacka! Remix)" | Ella Fitzgerald |
| 8. | "Do What You Wanna (Mr. Scruff's Soul Party Mix)" | Ramsey Lewis |
| 9. | "Soul Sauce (Fila Brazillia Remix)" | Cal Tjader |
| 10. | "Fried Neckbones and Some Home Fries (Dan the Automator Remix)" | Willie Bobo |
| 11. | "Naima's Love Song (DJ Spinna Remix)" | Betty Carter |
| 12. | "Mama (Metro Area Birthday Dub)" | Hugh Masekela |
| 13. | "Here's That Rainy Day (Koop Remix)" | Astrud Gilberto |
| 14. | "Black Is the Color of My True Love's Hair (Jaffa Remix)" | Nina Simone |

=== Verve Remixed 2 - Extended Mixes EP (2003) ===
| No. | Title | Original artist | Length |
|---|---|---|---|
| 1. | "Manteca (The Funky Lowlives Extended Remix)" | Dizzy Gillespie |
| 2. | "Blues for Brother George Jackson (Mondo Grosso Next Wave Extended Mix)" | Archie Shepp |
| 3. | "Sinnerman (Felix da Housecat's Heavenly House Remix Extended Vocal)" | Nina Simone |
| 4. | "Sinnerman (Felix da Housecat's Heavenly House Remix Extended Instrumental)" | Nina Simone |

=== Verve Remixed 3 (2005) ===
| No. | Title | Original artist | Length |
|---|---|---|---|
| 1. | "Little Girl Blue (The Postal Service Remix)" | Nina Simone |
| 2. | "Speak Low (Bent Remix)" | Billie Holiday |
| 3. | "Sing, Sing, Sing (RSL Remix)" | Anita O'Day |
| 4. | "Fever (Adam Freeland Remix)" | Sarah Vaughan |
| 5. | "Come Dance with Me (Sugardaddy Remix)" | Shirley Horn |
| 6. | "Just One Of Those Things (Brazilian Girls Remix)" | Blossom Dearie |
| 7. | "The Gentle Rain (RJD2 Remix)" | Astrud Gilberto |
| 8. | "Peter Gunn (Max Sedgley Remix)" | Sarah Vaughan |
| 9. | "Stay Loose (Lyrics Born Remix)" | Jimmy Smith |
| 10. | "The Boy's Doin' It (Carl Craig Remix)" | Hugh Masekela |
| 11. | "Lilac Wine (The Album Leaf Remix)" | Nina Simone |
| 12. | "Yesterdays (Junior Boys Remix)" | Billie Holiday |
| 13. | "Baby, Did You Hear? (Danger Mouse Remix)" | Dinah Washington |

iTunes Store bonus track
| No. | Title | Original artist | Length |
|---|---|---|---|
| 14. | "Popcorn (Diplo Remix)" | Walter Wanderley |

=== Verve Remixed Plus (2005) ===
| No. | Title | Original artist | Length |
|---|---|---|---|
| 1. | "Popcorn (Diplo Remix)" | Walter Wanderley |
| 2. | "Los Banditos (Michael Reinboth Remix)" | Cal Tjader |
| 3. | "Afro-Harping (Carl Craig Remix)" | Dorothy Ashby |
| 4. | "1-2-3 (Raw Deal Remix)" | Ramsey Lewis |
| 5. | "Manteca (Funky Lowlives Extended Mix)" | Dizzy Gillespie |
| 6. | "Sinnerman (Felix Da Housecat's Heavenly House Extended Vocal Mix)" | Nina Simone |
| 7. | "Fever (Adam Freeland Extended Mix)" | Sarah Vaughan |
| 8. | "Slap That Bass (Miguel Migs Petalpusher Extended Mix)" | Ella Fitzgerald |
| 9. | "Blues For Brother George Jackson (Mondo Grosso Next Wave Extended Mix)" | Archie Shepp |

=== Verve Remixed 4 (2008) ===
| No. | Title | Original artist | Length |
|---|---|---|---|
| 1. | "Cry Me a River (Truth & Soul Remix)" | Dinah Washington |
| 2. | "Gimme Some (Mike Mangini Remix)" | Nina Simone |
| 3. | "There Was a Time (Kenny Dope Remix)" | James Brown |
| 4. | "California Soul (Diplo/Mad Decent Remix)" | Marlena Shaw |
| 5. | "Take Care of Business (Pilooski Remix)" | Nina Simone |
| 6. | "Bim Bom (Psapp Remix)" | Astrud Gilberto |
| 7. | "Everybody Loves the Sunshine (9th Wonder Remix)" | Roy Ayers |
| 8. | "Tenderly (Mocky Remix)" | Anita O'Day |
| 9. | "Dilo Como Yo (Antibalas Remix)" | Patato & Totico |
| 10. | "Evil Ways (Karriem Riggins Remix)" | Willie Bobo |
| 11. | "Tea for Two (Chris Shaw Remix)" | Sarah Vaughan |
| 12. | "I Get a Kick out of You (The Cinematic Orchestra Remix)" | Ella Fitzgerald |

=== Verve Remixed Christmas (2008) ===
| No. | Title | Original artist | Length |
|---|---|---|---|
| 1. | "Good Morning Blues (The Real Tuesday Weld Clarkenwell Mix)" | Count Basie |
| 2. | "Zat You, Santa Claus? (The Heavy Remix)" | Louis Armstrong |
| 3. | "What Are You Doing New Year's Eve? (Mangini vs. Pallin Mix)" | Ella Fizgerald |
| 4. | "I've Got My Love to Keep Me Warm (Yesking Remix)" | Billie Holiday |
| 5. | "What a Wonderful World (The Orb Remix)" | Louis Armstrong |
| 6. | "Winter Wonderland (Christian Prommer Remix)" | Shirley Horne |
| 7. | "God Rest Ye Merry Gentlemen (Oh No Remix)" | Jimmy Smith |
| 8. | "I Am Blessed (Wax Tailor Remix)" | Nina Simone |
| 9. | "Silent Night (Brazilian Girls Remix)" | Dinah Washington |
| 10. | "The Christmas Song (Sonny J Remix)" | Mel Tormé |
| 11. | "Chilly Winds (Fink Remix)" | Nina Simone |

=== Verve Remixed: L.A. Noire (2011) ===
| No. | Title | Original artist | Length |
|---|---|---|---|
| 1. | "Stone Cold Dead In The Market (Ticklah Remix)" | Ella Fitzgerald |
| 2. | "Hey-Ba-Ba-Re-Bop (Midnight Sun Remix)" | Lionel Hampton |
| 3. | "A Slick Chick (David Andrew Remix)" | Dinah Washington |
| 4. | "Ain't Nobody Here But Us Chickens (DJ Premier Remix)" | Louis Jordan |
| 5. | "Sing Sing Sing (Truth & Soul Remix)" | Gene Krupa |
| 6. | "That Ole Devil Call Love (Moodymann Remix)" | Billie Holiday |

=== Verve Remixed: The First Ladies (2013) ===
| No. | Title | Original artist | Length |
|---|---|---|---|
| 1. | "Too Darn Hot (RAC Mix)" | Ella Fitzgerald |
| 2. | "Fly Me to the Moon (Kaskade Remix)" | Astrud Gilberto |
| 3. | "Please Mr. Brown (Pontus Winnberg of Miike Snow Remix)" | Sarah Vaughan |
| 4. | "Feeling Good (Bassnectar Remix)" | Nina Simone |
| 5. | "Women of the Ghetto (Flume's Jackin House Remix)" | Marlena Shaw |
| 6. | "Don't Let Me Be Misunderstood (Zeds Dead Remix)" | Nina Simone |
| 7. | "My Man (Toro Y Moi Remix)" | Billie Holiday |
| 8. | "So Nice (Azari & III Remix)" | Astrud Gilberto and Walter Wanderley Trio |
| 9. | "Jericho (C2C Remix)" | Sister Rosetta Tharpe |
| 10. | "I Put a Spell on You (Pretty Lights Remix)" | Nina Simone |
| 11. | "Blue Skies (Maya Jane Coles Remix)" | Ella Fitzgerald |
| 12. | "Corcovado (TOKiMONSTA Remix)" | Stan Getz & Joao Gilberto |
| 13. | "I've Got You Under My Skin (Carnage and Victor Niglio Remix)" | Dinah Washington |
