= Reverse echo =

Sound effect

Guitar with reverse reverb
A clean guitar sample, followed by a version with a reverse reverb effect

Reverse echo and reverse reverb (a.k.a. preverb) are sound effects created as the result of recording an echo or reverb effect of an audio recording played backwards. The original recording is then played forward, accompanied by the recording of the echoed or reverberated signal, which now precedes the original signal. The process produces a swelling effect preceding and during playback.

== Development ==
Guitarist and producer Jimmy Page claims to have invented the effect, stating that he originally developed the method when recording the single "Ten Little Indians" with the Yardbirds in 1967. He later used it on a number of Led Zeppelin tracks, including "You Shook Me", "Whole Lotta Love", and their cover of "When the Levee Breaks". In an interview he gave to Guitar World magazine in May 1993, Page explained:

During one session [with The Yardbirds], we were recording "Ten Little Indians", which was an extremely silly song that featured a truly awful brass arrangement. In fact, the whole track sounded terrible. In a desperate attempt to salvage it, I hit upon an idea. I said, "Look, turn the tape over and employ the echo for the brass on a spare track. Then turn it back over and we'll get the echo preceding the signal." The result was very interesting—it made the track sound like it was going backwards.

Despite Page's claims, an earlier example of the effect is possibly heard towards the end of the 1966 Lee Mallory single "That's the Way It's Gonna Be", produced by Curt Boettcher.

== Usage in music ==
Jimmy Page of Led Zeppelin used this effect in the bridge of "Whole Lotta Love" (1969). Another early example is found in "Alucard" from the eponymous Gentle Giant album (1970), although usage was somewhat common throughout the 1970s, for example in "Crying to the Sky" by Be-Bop Deluxe.

Reverse reverb is commonly used in shoegaze, particularly by such bands as My Bloody Valentine and Spacemen 3. It is also often used as a lead-in to vocal passages in hardstyle music, and various forms of EDM and pop music. The reverse reverb is applied to the first word or syllable of the vocal for a build-up effect or other-worldly sound.

Metallica used the effect in the song "Fade To Black" on James Hetfield's vocals in their 1984 album Ride The Lightning. The effect was also employed by Genesis (on Phil Collins's snare drum) at the end of the song "Deep in the Motherlode" on the 1978 album ...And Then There Were Three....

Backwards Traveller/Cuff Link by Wings (1978) begins with prominent preverb on the first syllable.

== Use in other media ==
Reverse reverb has been used in filmmaking and television production for an otherworldly effect on voices, especially in horror movies.

Reverse reverb was also used in the production logo for CBS Studios.
