= Now (Astrud Gilberto album) =

Studio album by Astrud Gilberto
- Released: October 1, 1972
- Studios: Blue Rock Studio, New York City
- Genres: Latin music; world music; pop rock; vocal
- Length: 34:46
- Label: Perception

Astrud Gilberto chronology
Gilberto with Turrentine (1971)	Now (1972)	That Girl from Ipanema (1977)

Professional ratings
Review scores
Source	Rating
AllMusic	2.5/5 stars

Now is a studio album by Brazilian bossa nova singer Astrud Gilberto, released on Perception Records in 1972. The album was recorded at Blue Rock Studio, New York City.

== Reception ==
According to the AllMusic review, "Her four songs on this ten-song album show she has a way with a melody, though obviously influenced by countrymen Milton Nascimento and Jorge Ben, and her producer Eumir Deodato. "Gingele" and "Zigy Zigy Za" are exactly the kind of riff-based tropicalismo that Ben and company were making popular around this time. "Take It Easy My Brother Charlie" is probably her best song here." A reviewer from Cash Box magazine noted that Gilberto did not lose her grip after returning and actually improved her witchcraft. The Record World magazine wrote: "Since her "Girl From Ipanema" smash some years back Astrud Gilberto hasn't had too many big hits, but she's remained a superb interpreter with one of the most distinctive voices around. Everything comes together rather nicely on her new album, which also reveals her to be a fine writer."

== Track listing ==
1. "Zigy Zigy Za" (Astrud Gilberto) – 4:03
2. "Make Love to Me" (Gilberto, Eumir Deodato) – 3:16
3. "Baiao" (Luiz Gonzaga, Humberto Teixeira) – 3:00
4. "Touching You" (Patrick Adams, David Jordan) – 3:48
5. "Gingele" (Gilberto) – 3:59
6. "Take It Easy, My Brother Charlie" (Jorge Ben (uncredited), Gilberto, Jordan) – 3:22
7. "Where Have You Been?" (Gilberto) – 3:05
8. "General da Banda" (José Alcides, Sátiro de Melo, Tancredo Silva) – 3:36
9. "Bridges" (Fernando Brant, Gene Lees, Milton Nascimento) – 3:46
10. "Daybreak (Walking Out on Yesterday)" (Bing Bingham) – 2:51

== Charts ==
Chart performance for Now
Chart (1972)	Peak Position
US Record World Jazz LP Chart	19
