= Plus (Astrud Gilberto and James Last album) =

Studio album by Astrud Gilberto and James Last
- Released: October 1986
- Recorded: 1986
- Studio: New River Studios, Fort Lauderdale; Studio Hamburg, Hamburg, West Germany
- Genre: Vocal jazz; bossa nova; pop
- Length: 42:48
- Language: English; Portuguese
- Label: Polydor
- Producer: Astrud Gilberto; James Last

Astrud Gilberto chronology
So & So: Mukai Meets Gilberto (1982)	Plus (1986)	Live In New York (1996)

James Last chronology
In Ireland (1986)	Plus (1986)	Alles hat ein Ende nur die Wurst hat zwei (1987)

Professional ratings
Review scores
Source	Rating
AllMusic	3/5 stars
Encyclopedia of Popular Music	3/5 stars

Plus is a joint studio album by Brazilian singer Astrud Gilberto and German composer James Last, released in 1986 by Polydor Records. The album was recorded at different studios in Florida (USA) and Hamburg (Germany). The producers were the artists themselves. In the US, the album was released in 1987 by Verve Records under the title Astrud Gilberto Plus James Last Orchestra with an alternative cover.

== Critical reception ==
Ron Wynn from AllMusic gave the album three of five stars and noted that "Gilberto still has alluring sound".

== Track listing ==
No.	Title	Writer(s)	Length
1.	"Samba do Soho" (featuring Paulo Jobim)	Ronaldo Bastos; Paulo Jobim	3:03
2.	"I'm Nothin' Without You"	Astrud Gilberto; Antonio Carlos Jobim	4:22
3.	"Champagne and Caviar"	Gilberto	3:20
4.	"Listen to Your Heart" (featuring Ron Last)	Ron Last	4:30
5.	"Moonrain" (featuring Paulo Jobim)	Bastos; Jobim	3:22
6.	"Caravan"	Gilberto; Irving Mills; Juan Tizol; Duke Ellington	3:45
7.	"Amor e Som"	Gilberto	3:35
8.	"Saci"	Gilberto; Jobim	5:28
9.	"Forgive Me"	Gilberto; Duduka Fonseca	4:23
10.	"With Love (When They Turn On the Light)" (featuring Ron Last)	Gilberto; James Last	3:14
11.	"Agua de Beber"	Norman Gimbel; Vinicius de Moraes; Jobim	3:43
Total length:			42:48

== Personnel ==
- Astrud Gilberto – vocals
- James Last – arrangement
- Thomas Eggert – audio engineering, synthesizer
- Peter Klemt – audio engineering
- Ron Last – audio engineering, synthesizer
- Ted Stein – audio engineering
- Romero Lubambo – acoustic guitar, electric guitar
- Katie Kissoon – backing vocals
- Nicky Sun – backing vocals
- Pearly Gates – backing vocals
- Marcelo Gilberto – bass guitar
- Axel Schönlein – bass guitar
- Benny Bendorff – bass guitar
- Uwe Boiko – bass guitar
- Björn Hängsel – bass trombone
- Christoph Weiss – cello
- Joachim Kerwin – cello
- Michael Streif – cello
- Thomas Bruder – cello
- Duduka Fonseca – drums, percussion
- Terry Jenkins – drums
- Peter Hesslein – guitar
- Edson Da Silva – percussion
- Herbert Bornholdt – percussion
- Steve Herrick – piano, Rhodes piano
- Günter Platzek – piano
- Karl-Hermann Lüer – saxophone, flute
- Stan Sulzmann – saxophone, flute
- David Sacks – trombone
- Detlef Surmann – trombone
- Ole Holmquist – trombone
- Bob Coassin – trumpet
- Bob Lanese – trumpet
- Derek Watkins – trumpet
- Hakan Nyqvist – trumpet
- Anne-Louise Comerford – viola
- Christine Kaulbach – viola
- Gerd Gräbnitz – viola
- Ulrich Schneider – viola
- Alfred Meichsner – violin
- Bronislaw Ogiba – violin
- Christian Brüning – violin
- Friederike Zumach – violin
- Martin Lehmann – violin
- Ralf Caspers – violin
- Richard Kohnen – violin
- Sally Ann Yeh – violin
- Stefan Pintev – violin
- Susanne Ingwersen – violin
- Winfried Vögele – violin
- Wulf Lohbeck – violin

Credits are adapted from the album's liner notes.

== Charts ==
Chart performance for Plus
Chart (1986)	Peak position
Dutch Albums (Album Top 100)	42
