= That Girl from Ipanema =

Studio album by Astrud Gilberto
- Released: 1977
- Studio: Downtown Sound, New York
- Genre: Bossa nova; disco
- Length: 35:22
- Label: Image Records
- Producer: Astrud Gilberto; Vince Montana

Astrud Gilberto chronology
Now (1972)	That Girl from Ipanema (1977)	So & So (1982)

That Girl from Ipanema is the eleventh studio album by Brazilian singer Astrud Gilberto, released in 1977 by Image Records. The album features a large number of songs written by Gilberto herself. The influence of disco music is also noticeable on the record. Subsequently, the album was reissued many times with different covers and a mixed track list.

== Critical reception ==
Professional ratings
Review scores
Source	Rating
AllMusic	1.5/5 stars
Encyclopedia of Popular Music	4/5 stars

Billboard magazine wrote that the Brazilian singer has not lost her appeal at all, despite a long break in the release of vinyl. Record World noted that the new disco version of "The Girl from Ipanema" sounds great.

== Track listing ==
Side A
No.	Title	Writer(s)	Length
1.	"The Girl from Ipanema"	Vinícius de Moraes; Norman Gimbel; Antônio Carlos Jobim	3:16
2.	"Meu Pião"	Zé Do Norte	3:39
3.	"Far Away" (with Chet Baker)	Astrud Gilberto; Hal Shaper	4:22
4.	"We’ll Make Today Last Night Again"	Gilberto	3:06
5.	"Black Magic (A Gira)"	Gilberto; Beto Scala; Umberto Silva	3:11

Side B
No.	Title	Writer(s)	Length
1.	"All I’ve Got"	Gilberto	6:09
2.	"Love for Sale"	Cole Porter	3:12
3.	"Wanting You"	David Buskin; Theodore Irwin	2:37
4.	"The Puppy Song"	Harry Nilsson	2:51
5.	"Mamãe Eu Quero / Chica Chica Boom Chic"	Al Stillman; Vicente Paiva / Harry Warren; Mack Gordon	3:00
