= The Shadow of Your Smile (Astrud Gilberto album) =

Studio album by Astrud Gilberto
- Released: 1965
- Recorded: October 21, 1964 – February 4, 1965
- Studio: RCA Studios; A&R Studios
- Genre: Bossa nova
- Length: 25:28
- Label: Verve
- Producer: Creed Taylor

Astrud Gilberto chronology
The Astrud Gilberto Album (1965)	The Shadow of Your Smile (1965)	Look to the Rainbow (1966)

Professional ratings
Review scores
Source	Rating
AllMusic	2/5 stars
Down Beat	2/5 stars

The Shadow of Your Smile is a studio album by Astrud Gilberto. With arrangements by Don Sebesky, Claus Ogerman, and João Donato, it was released via Verve Records in 1965. It peaked at number 66 on the Billboard 200 chart.

== Track listing ==
No.	Title	Writer(s)	Length
1.	"The Shadow of Your Smile"	Johnny Mandel, Paul Francis Webster	2:31
2.	"(Take Me to) Aruanda"	Norman Gimbel, Carlos Lyra, Geraldo Vandre	2:30
3.	"Manhã de Carnaval"	Luiz Bonfá, Antonio Maria	1:57
4.	"Fly Me to the Moon"	Bart Howard	2:22
5.	"The Gentle Rain"	Bonfá, Matt Duby	2:26
6.	"Non-Stop to Brazil"	Bonfá, Duby, Gimbel	2:27
7.	"O Ganso"	Bonfá	2:09
8.	"Who Can I Turn To?"	Leslie Bricusse, Anthony Newley	2:10
9.	"Day by Day"	Sammy Cahn, Axel Stordahl, Paul Weston	2:09
10.	"Tristeza"	Bonfá, Maria Toledo	2:23
11.	"Funny World"	Alan Brandt, Ennio Morricone	2:24

== Charts ==
Chart	Peak position
US Billboard 200	66
