= Canta en Italiano (Gene Pitney EP) =

Canta En Italiano is a 1965 EP by Gene Pitney. The EP contains four tracks taken from the Gene Italiano LP.

== Tracklisting ==
1. Amici Miei 2:55
2. E Cuando Viene La Notte 2:49
3. Saro Forte 2:14
4. I Tuoi Anni Piu Belli 3:07
