= Gilberto with Turrentine =

Studio album by Astrud Gilberto and Stanley Turrentine
- Released: 1971
- Recorded: January 13, February 1 & 4, March 19 and April 6, 1971
- Studio: Van Gelder Studio, Englewood Cliffs, NJ
- Genre: Jazz
- Length: 38:11
- Label: CTI; CTI 6008
- Producer: Creed Taylor

Astrud Gilberto chronology
September 17, 1969 (1970)	Gilberto with Turrentine (1971)	Astrud Gilberto Now (1972)

Stanley Turrentine chronology
The Sugar Man (1971)	Gilberto with Turrentine (1971)	Salt Song (1971)

Gilberto with Turrentine is an album by Brazilian samba and bossa nova singer Astrud Gilberto and American saxophonist Stanley Turrentine featuring performances recorded in 1971 released on the CTI label.

== Reception ==
The AllMusic review calls the album a "set that had some mildly entertaining moments."

Professional ratings
Review scores
Source	Rating
AllMusic	2/5 stars

== Track listing ==
1. "Wanting Things" (Burt Bacharach, Hal David) – 2:35
2. "Brazilian Tapestry" (Eumir Deodato) – 5:10
3. "To a Flame" (Stephen Stills) – 3:17
4. "Solo el Fin (For All We Know)" (Fred Karlin, Arthur James, Robb Wilson) – 3:10
5. "Zazueira" (Jorge Ben) – 3:40
6. "Ponteio" (José Carlos Capinam, Edú Lobo) – 3:35
7. "Traveling Light" (Deodato, Martha Everett) – 3:25
8. "Vera Cruz" (Fernando Brant, Gene Lees, Milton Nascimento) – 5:05
9. "Historia de Amor (Love Story)" (Alfonso Alpin, Carl Sigman, Francis Lai) – 3:29
10. "Where There's a Heartache (There Must Be a Heart)" (Bacharach, David) – 3:10
11. "Just Be You" (Astrud Gilberto) – 2:29 Bonus track on CD reissue
12. "The Puppy Song" (Harry Nilsson) – 3:21 Bonus track on CD reissue
13. "Polytechnical High" (Harry Nilsson) – 2:48 Bonus track on CD reissue

- Recorded at Van Gelder Studio in Englewood Cliffs, New Jersey on January 13 (tracks 9–11), February 1 (tracks 4 & 13), February 4 (tracks 1, 3, 7 & 12), March 19 (tracks 2 & 5), and April 6 (track 6 & 8), 1971

== Personnel ==
- Astrud Gilberto – vocals
- Stanley Turrentine – tenor saxophone (tracks 2, 5, 6 & 8)
- Eumir Deodato – electric piano, arranger, conductor
- Emanuel Green, George Marge, Hubert Laws, Romeo Penque – flute (tracks 2, 5, 7, 8 & 10)
- Gene Bertoncini (tracks 1, 3, 4, 7, 10 & 12), Sivuca (tracks 2, 5, 6, 8) – guitar
- Sam Brown (tracks 1, 2, 5, 6, 8, 12 & 13), Bob Mann (tracks 3, 4, 7, 9 & 12) – electric guitar
- Toots Thielemans – harmonica (tracks 6 & 11)
- Ron Carter (tracks 1–3, 5–8 & 11), Russell George (tracks 4 & 9–13) – bass
- Denny Seiwell (tracks 4, 9, 10 & 13), Dom Um Romão (tracks 2, 5 & 11), João Palma (tracks 1, 3, 7 & 12) – drums
- Airto Moreira – percussion (tracks 2, 5 & 11)
- Emanuel Green, Gene Orloff, Harry Katzman, Joe Malin, Julie Held, Paul Gershman – violin (tracks 1–5 & 7–10)
- Harold Coletta – viola (tracks 1, 2, 4, 7–10)
- George Ricci – cello (tracks 1–5 & 7–10)
