= Colégio de Aplicação da UFRJ =

CAp UFRJ
- Colégio de Aplicação da UFRJ

Location
- Rua J.J. Seabra, s/n Rio de Janeiro, Rio de Janeiro; Brazil
- Coordinates: 22°57′53.15″S 43°12′58.24″W

Information
- Type: Primary to Secondary public school
- Established: May 20, 1948
- President: Anna Sophia
- Principal: Celina Maria de Souza Costa
- Faculty: 120 (80 effective and 40 temporary)
- Grades: Alphabetization Class to 3rd grade of Ensino Médio (ages 6 - 17)
- Enrollment: 760 (510 in the morning shift and 250 in the afternoon shift)
- Campus: Urban
- Colours: White and green
- Affiliation: UFRJ
- Emblem: UFRJ's logo depicting Minerva
- National ranking: 7th (1st among public schools), as of 2008
- Website: http://www.cap.ufrj.br

The Colégio de Aplicação da UFRJ (Laboratory School of UFRJ), also known as CAp UFRJ, is a public federal school maintained by UFRJ, the Federal University of Rio de Janeiro. Being a laboratory school, it also serves as a training ground for future teachers graduating on UFRJ.

== History ==
Founded on May 20, 1948, the school was located in a building by the beach of Botafogo, yielded by Fundação Getulio Vargas. From 1952 to 1962 the school remained in another building in São Salvador square granted by the state government, and in 1962 it was transferred to its current location. Despite being a small school, CAp was, in the mid-1960s, one of the strongest references on student activism, the main force of resistance against the Brazilian military dictatorship.

CAp is located on J.J. Seabra street, in the neighbourhood of Lagoa, South Zone of Rio de Janeiro. The building it occupies today is not federal - it belongs to the state government, and was landmarked by the city mayor for being one of the few horizontal constructions on Lagoa. It is in a rather bad condition, but the lack of government funding and these special conditions have contributed to making it quite difficult to have any effective restorations.

In May 2005, a wall collapsed on one of the classrooms. It was a holiday, so the school was empty and no one was hurt. This triggered a rise on funds available for restorations on 2006, but some projects had to be delayed because of problems on the structure of the building.

There is a request from the student body regarding giving CAp a building of its own. Most people suggest it could be located inside the UFRJ campus at Urca, but unfortunately this is not a priority for the federal government as it would demand too many resources.

== Relations with university ==
"Colégio de Aplicação", literally "Application School", means that the school is used as a training or research ground for UFRJ student-teachers.

Students of CAp UFRJ may engage in research projects at UFRJ through NICJr. ("Núcleo de Iniciação Científica Jr.", English: "Junior Scientific Initiation Nucleus").

== Students ==
As of 2008, classes on CAp are available from 1st grade of Ensino Fundamental (roughly equivalent to Elementary and Middle School) to the 3rd grade of "Ensino Médio" (roughly equivalent to High School). Students from the first five years have classes in the afternoon, and the rest in the morning, the only exception being the final year, in which there are classes in the afternoon in addition to the morning ones.

There are admission draws for the 1st grade, in which 50 students enter the school, being divided in 2 classes of 25, on the 6th grade of "Ensino Fundamental", with 10 vacancies, dividing students in two classes of 30 each. On the 1st grade of "Ensino Médio" (9th grade), when 30 more students join the school, making it three classes of 30 students. And on the 2nd grade of "Ensino Médio" when they fill out the empty vacancies left by students who may have left the school or the ones who did not pass to the 2nd grade.

This makes for a total of 760 students - 510 on the morning shift and 250 on the afternoon shift - not counting those who fail or who join the school in special conditions, such as being transferred from another laboratory school.

Students are allowed one failure in the first nine years and one more in the last three. Any additional failures immediately expels the student from the school.

== Notable alumni ==
- Cassetas - Brazilian humourists,
- Miguel Paiva - cartoonist,
- Alfredo Sirkis and Carlos Minc - politicians,
- Bel Kutner - actress,
- Paulo Henrique Amorim - journalist.
