= I Haven't Got Anything Better to Do =

Studio album by Astrud Gilberto
- Released: 1969
- Recorded: February 3 and 4 1969
- Genre: Baroque pop; vocal pop
- Length: 28:37
- Label: Verve
- Producer: Brooks Arthur

Astrud Gilberto chronology
Windy (1969)	I Haven't Got Anything Better to Do (1969)	September 17, 1969 (1971)

Professional ratings
Review scores
Source	Rating
AllMusic	4/5 stars

I Haven't Got Anything Better to Do is a studio album by Brazilian bossa nova singer Astrud Gilberto, released on Verve Records in 1969. In the liner notes Gilberto calls the album her "fireplace album".

== Reception ==
The AllMusic review calls the album "an intimate, nocturnal set closer in scope and spirit to the Baroque pop of Burt Bacharach," stating that it is "a minor masterpiece".

== Track listing ==
1. "I Haven't Got Anything Better to Do (No Tengo Nada Mejor...)" (Lee Pockriss, Paul Vance) – 2:59
2. "Didn't We" (Jimmy Webb) – 2:57
3. "Wailing of the Willow" (Harry Nilsson) – 2:16
4. "Where's the Love" (Bobby Weinstein, Michel Legrand) – 2:22
5. "The Sea Is My Soil (I Remember When)" (Dori Caymmi, Nelson Motta, Peter Udell) – 3:28
6. "Trains and Boats and Planes" (Burt Bacharach, Hal David) – 2:50
7. "World Stop Turning" (Moose Charlap, Peter Udell) – 2:18
8. "Without Him" (Harry Nilsson) – 4:35
9. "Wee Small Hours" (Bob Hilliard, David Mann) – 2:18
10. "If (The Biggest Little World)" (Garry Sherman, Peter Udell) – 2:34

== Personnel ==
- Astrud Gilberto – vocals
- Albert Gorgoni – arranger, conductor, guitar
- Wayne André, Mickey Gravine, Tony Studd – trombone
- Alan Rath – bass trombone
- Burt Collins, John Glasel, Irvin Markowitz – trumpet
- Art Kaplan – saxophone
- Ben Blumenreich, Lewis Eley, Joe Haber, Lew Haber, Harry Lookofsky, Matthew Raimondi, Tosha Samaroff, Irving Spice, Louis Stone – violin
- Seymour Berman, David Saxon – viola
- Maurice Bialkin, Seymour Barab – cello
- Eugene Bianco – harp
- Gary Chester – drums
- David Carey, George Devens, Aiuto Morgira, Joe Venuto – percussion
- Sam Brown – guitar
- Richard Davis, George Duvivier – bass
- Stan Free, Frank Owens, Paul Griffin – keyboard
