= Look to the Rainbow (Astrud Gilberto album) =

Look To The Rainbow

Studio album by Astrud Gilberto
- Released: 1966
- Recorded: November 22, December 6, 10 and 23, 1965 & February 4, 1966
- Studio: Van Gelder Studio, Englewood Cliffs, New Jersey
- Genre: Bossa nova
- Length: 28:46
- Label: Verve
- Producer: Creed Taylor

Astrud Gilberto chronology
| The Shadow of Your Smile (1965) | Look To The Rainbow (1966) | A Certain Smile, A Certain Sadness (1966) |

Professional ratings
Review scores
| Source | Rating |
|---|---|
| Allmusic | 4.5/5 stars |
| Billboard | favorable |
| DownBeat | 4/5 stars |
| St. Petersburg Times | favorable |

Look to the Rainbow is a 1966 album by Astrud Gilberto, arranged by Gil Evans and Al Cohn.

== Track listing ==
External audio
- You may listen to "She's a Carioca" here

Side One

1. "Berimbau" (Ray Gilbert, Baden Powell, Vinicius De Moraes) – 2:31
2. "Once Upon a Summertime" (Johnny Mercer, Michel Legrand, Eddie Barclay, Eddy Marnay) – 2:30
3. "Felicidade" (Antônio Carlos Jobim) – 2:41
4. "I Will Wait for You" (LeGrand, Norman Gimbel) – 4:42
5. "Frevo" (Jobim) – 2:20

Side Two

1. "Maria Quiet" (Maria Moite) – 1:50
2. "Look to the Rainbow" (Burton Lane, E.Y. "Yip" Harburg) – 3:20
3. "Bim Bom" (João Gilberto) – 1:50
4. "Lugar Bonito" (Carlos Lyra, Gimbel) – 3:15
5. "Eu Preciso Aprender a Ser só (Learn to Live Alone)" (Marcos Valle, Ray Gilbert) – 3:15
6. "She's a Carioca" (Jobim) – 2:22

Arranged by Gil Evans, except Side Two, tracks 4 and 5, arranged by Al Cohn.

== Personnel ==
- Dom Um Romão – percussion (Side One, track 1)
- Johnny Coles – trumpet solo (Side One, track 4)

Astrud Gilberto - voice Gil Evans - arranger Al Cohn - arranger
