= The Astrud Gilberto Album =

Studio album by Astrud Gilberto
- Released: 1965
- Recorded: January 27–28, 1965
- Studios: RCA Studios, Hollywood, California
- Genre: Bossa nova
- Length: 28:16
- Label: Verve
- Producer: Creed Taylor

Astrud Gilberto chronology
The Astrud Gilberto Album (1965)	The Shadow of Your Smile (1965)

Professional ratings
Review scores
Source	Rating
AllMusic	4.5/5 stars

The Astrud Gilberto Album (with Antonio Carlos Jobim) is the debut studio album by Astrud Gilberto. With Antonio Carlos Jobim on guitar and the arrangements by Marty Paich, it was released via Verve Records in 1965. It peaked at number 41 on the Billboard 200 chart. In 2017, NPR placed it at number 73 on the "150 Greatest Albums Made by Women" list.

== Track listing ==
No.	Title	Writer(s)	Length
1.	"Once I Loved"	Ray Gilbert, Antônio Carlos Jobim, Vinicius de Moraes	2:14
2.	"Água de Beber"	Jobim, Moraes	2:20
3.	"Meditation"	Gimbel, Jobim, Newton Mendonça	2:42
4.	"...and Roses and Roses"	Dorival Caymmi, Gilbert	2:37
5.	"O Morro (Não tem Vez)"	Jobim, Moraes	2:59
6.	"How Insensitive"	Gimbel, Jobim, Moraes	2:51
7.	"Dindi"	Gilbert, Jobim, Aloísio de Oliveira	2:44
8.	"Photograph"	Jobim	2:12
9.	"Dreamer"	Jobim, Gene Lees	2:03
10.	"Só Tinha de Ser Com Você"	Jobim	2:22
11.	"All That's Left Is to Say Goodbye"	Astrud Gilberto, Jobim, Moraes	3:13

== Personnel ==
- Astrud Gilberto – vocals
- Antônio Carlos Jobim – guitar, vocals (on track 2)
- Joe Mondragon – double bass
- Bud Shank – alto saxophone, flute
- João Donato – piano
- Stu Williamson – trumpet
- Milt Bernhart – trombone
- Guildhall String Ensemble – ensemble

== Charts ==
Chart	Peak position
US Billboard 200	41
