= Jungle (Astrud Gilberto album) =

Studio album by Astrud Gilberto
- Released: February 2002
- Recorded: 2001
- Studios: Indre Studios, Indre Studios
- Genres: Bossa nova; latin jazz
- Languages: Portuguese; English
- Label: Magya Productions
- Producers: Astrud Gilberto; Mark Lambert

Astrud Gilberto chronology
Temperance (1997)	Jungle (2002)

Professional ratings
Review scores
Source	Rating
AllMusic	4/5 stars

Jungle is a studio album by Brazilian singer Astrud Gilberto, released in February 2002 by Magya Productions. It was her last album before her death in 2023.

== Overview ==
The album was recorded in Philadelphia in the summer of 2001. The producer of the entire album and the author of most of the songs on the album was the singer herself, with the exception of "Como Fué", authored by Ernesto Duarte, as well as the final "The Look of Love", which was written by Burt Bacharach and Hal David.

The album was released on the independent label Magya Productions in 2002 in the United States, the peculiarity of the album was that it was sold only on the official website of the singer. The following year, the Japanese company Columbia Music Entertainment initiated the release of the album in Japan.

== Critical reception ==
Alex Henderson in his review for AllMusic noted that with this album the singer demonstrates that she can still be a charming, expressive vocalist, he also noted the variety of original compositions: from sensual ballads ("Dancing") to playful ("Pink House") and dancing ("É Só Me Pedir"). Summing up, he stated that the new material is a long-awaited addition to the singer's catalog.

== Track listing ==
All tracks are written by Astrud Gilberto, except where noted.

No.	Title	Writer(s)	Length
1.	"Jungle (Xangô)"		4:08
2.	"É Só Me Pedir"		5:06
3.	"Ocean Dreams"		4:32
4.	"In Spite Of The Odds"		4:45
5.	"Xaxado Do Safado"		3:42
6.	"Como Fué"	Ernesto Duarte	3:41
7.	"Red Umbrella"		3:51
8.	"Rebola, Bola"	Gilberto; Mark Lambert	4:25
9.	"Dancing"		4:29
10.	"Pink House"		3:11
11.	"Inner Song"		3:48
12.	"The Look of Love"	Burt Bacharach; Hal David	5:14

== Personnel ==
- Astrud Gilberto – vocals, background vocals, effects, production
- Mark Lambert – vocals (9), background vocals, effects, electric Guitar, acoustic Guitar, guitar synthesizer, production
- Valtinho Anastacio – vocals (1), background vocals, percussion
- Magrus – drums, vocals (8)
- John Margolis – vocals
- Carol Chaikin – alto saxophone, soprano Saxophone
- Dave Thornton – background vocals
- Nancy Falcow – background vocals
- Gregory Jones – bass
- Bogdan Hernik – effects, engineering (sound & mixing)
- Michael Comstock – engineering (Pro Tools)
- Hendrik Meurkens – harmonica
- Cliff Korman – keyboards, synthesizer
- Scott Hull – mastering
- Kimson Plaut – piano, accordion
- Luis Bonilla – trombone, whistling
