= Benny Bendorff =

German musician

Joachim "Benny" Bendorff (August 1946 – 2016) was a German bass guitarist, vocalist, trumpeter and composer, best known for his long tenure as bassist for the James Last Orchestra.

Born and raised in Hamburg, his mother Lya Bendorff was an opera singer, and his father Siegfried Bendorff was a ballet dancer, teacher and guitarist. He, his parents and his sister Monika Bendorff performed as a family in a cabaret act. Young Benny also became an accomplished trumpet player, performing as a soloist with the NDR (Norddeutscher Rundfunk, or North German Radio) orchestra at the age of 12. In his teens, Benny became more interested in the burgeoning rock scene, especially the English musicians who performed in Hamburg's Reeperbahn district. He took up the guitar and played in an instrumental band influenced by The Shadows, eventually switching to bass guitar and coming under the spell of The Beatles. He worked regularly in the Hamburg club scene and was also active as a studio musician.

In 1969, Bendorff was hired to play a session with the James Last Orchestra. The session was for Last's version of the rock musical Hair, and Last (an accomplished acoustic and electric bass player himself) was looking for a rock-oriented bassist strictly for the one session. As it turned out, Bendorff impressed Last so much that he was hired to replace the previous bassist Fiete Wacker and promptly came on board in time for a tour of Canada. Bendorff remained as bassist for the next 33 years. He co-wrote many songs with James Last and drummer/percussionist Barry Reeves (born Barry Roy Reeves, 1944, Birmingham, Warwickshire, died 6 February 2010), who was also a Last band member. One of the Last/Bendorff/Reeves compositions, Manja, was released as a Bendorff solo single in 1971. Bendorff was often featured as a vocal soloist for both recordings and concerts by Last, usually singing Paul McCartney songs like "Live And Let Die", "Mull Of Kintyre" and "Silly Love Songs". Bendorff's love of The Beatles was further evident in his 1985 solo album Flowers Of Liverpool. He cites Paul McCartney and Jet Harris of The Shadows as the main influences on his bass playing. He also composed original instrumental music with his sons Christoph Leis-Bendorff and Florian Leis-Bendorff, most of which was sold to television stations for background music.

From the 1990s onward, Bendorff had been increasingly involved in country-oriented music, playing in the Hamburg country band Third Coast. He retired from the James Last Orchestra in 2002. His son Florian Leis-Bendorff, a guitarist with the Austrian band Zillertaler Schürzenjäger, committed suicide in 2005.
