= Beach Samba =

Studio album by Astrud Gilberto
- Released: 1967
- Recorded: May 27 – June 30, 1967, New York
- Genre: Folk-pop; bossa nova; samba; easy listening
- Length: 27:38
- Label: Verve
- Producer: Creed Taylor

Astrud Gilberto chronology
A Certain Smile, A Certain Sadness (1965)	Beach Samba (1967)	Windy (1967)

Beach Samba is a 1967 studio album by Astrud Gilberto, arranged by Eumir Deodato and Don Sebesky.

Beach Samba was included in the book 1001 Albums You Must Hear Before You Die.

== Reception ==
Professional ratings
Review scores
Source	Rating
AllMusic	3/5 stars

The AllMusic review by Richie Unterberger awarded the album three stars and said that the album was "One of Gilberto's less impressive '60s Verve outings, primarily due to the more pop-oriented song selection...some of the pop choices work well, particularly Tim Hardin's gorgeous 'Misty Roses,'" and praised "Nao Bate O Corocao" saying that it had Gilberto "cutting loose with confident, sassy scats, as she rarely did before or since."

== Track listing ==
1. "Stay" (Gayle Caldwell) – 2:41
2. "Misty Roses" (Tim Hardin) – 2:36
3. "The Face I Love" (Norman Gimbel, Carlos Pingarilho, Marcos Valle) – 2:06
4. "A Banda (Parade)" (Chico Buarque, Bob Russell) – 2:07
5. "Oba, Oba" (Luiz Bonfá) – 1:59
6. "Canoeiro" (Eumir Deodato) – 1:32
7. "I Had the Craziest Dream" (Mack Gordon, Harry Warren) – 2:25
8. "Bossa Na Praia (Beach Samba)" (Geraldo Cunha, Pery Ribeiro) – 2:48
9. "My Foolish Heart" (Ned Washington, Victor Young) – 2:47
10. "Dia das Rosas (I Think of You)" (Bonfá, Patti Jacob) – 2:21
11. "You Didn't Have to Be So Nice" (Steve Boone, John Sebastian) – 2:41
12. "Não Bate O Coração" (Deodato) – 1:35

== Personnel ==
Performance

- Astrud Gilberto – vocals
- Marcello Gilberto – vocals on "You Didn't Have to Be So Nice"
- Eumir Deodato – arranger, conductor
- Don Sebesky – arranger, conductor
- Ron Carter – double bass
- Jule Ruggiro
- Seymour Barab – cello
- Maurice Bialkin
- Maurice Brown
- Charles McCracken
- George Ricci
- Harvey Shapiro
- Alan Shulman
- Marcos Valle – guitar
- Grady Tate – drums
- Ray Alonge – French horn
- James Buffington
- Earl Chapin
- Tony Miranda
- Toots Thielemans – guitar, harmonica, whistle
- Barry Galbraith – guitar
- Margaret Ross – harp
- George Devens – harpsichord, piano, vibraphone
- Benny Aronov – harpsichord, piano
- Alan Douglas – percussion
- Jack Jennings
- Dom Um Romão
- Warren Bernhardt – piano
- Wayne Andre – trombone
- Warren Covington
- Urbie Green
- Tony Studd
- Bernie Glow – trumpet
- Jimmy Nottingham
- Ernie Royal
- Marvin Stamm
- John Barber – tuba
- Harold Coletta – viola
- Richard Dickler
- Dave Mankovitz
- David Schwartz
- Arnold Eidus – violin
- Harry Katzman
- Leo Kruczek
- George Ockner
- Gene Orloff
- Phil Bodner – woodwind
- Bill Hammond
- Hubert Laws
- Seldon Powell
- Stanley Webb

Production

- Creed Taylor – producer
- Jerry Schatzberg – photography
- Chuck Stewart
- Michael Lang – reissue coordination
- Suha Gur – reissue mastering
- Tom "Curly" Ruff
- Aric Lach Morrison – reissue production assistance
- Jon Schapiro
- Jack Anesh – design
- David Krieger
- Peter Pullman – editing
- Brooks Arthur – engineer
- Val Valentin
- Rudy Van Gelder
