= Remix album =

Album consisting mostly of remixes or re-recorded versions of earlier released material

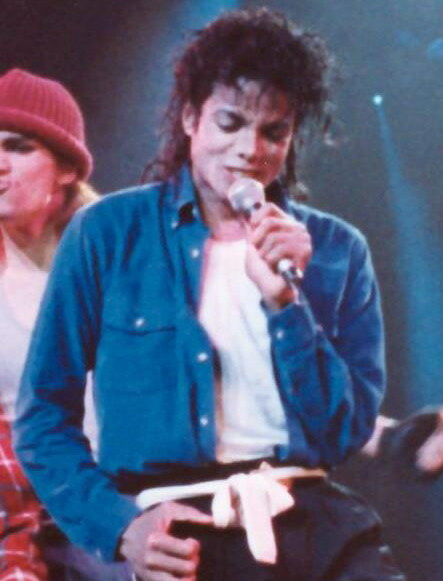
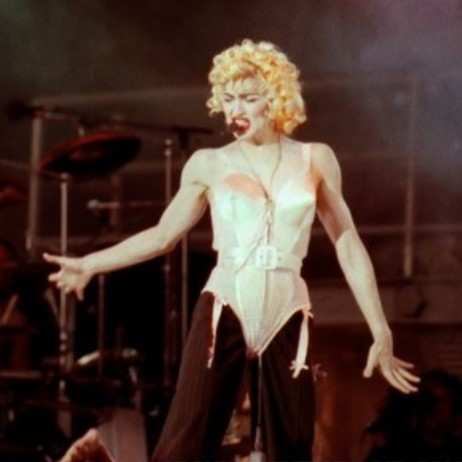
Michael Jackson (left) and Madonna have the first and second best-selling remix albums in history: Blood on the Dance Floor: HIStory in the Mix and You Can Dance, respectively

A remix album is an album consisting of remixes or rerecorded versions of an artist's earlier released material. The first act who employed the format was American singer-songwriter Harry Nilsson (Aerial Pandemonium Ballet, 1971). As of 2026 the best-selling remix album of all time is Michael Jackson's Blood on the Dance Floor: HIStory in the Mix (1997).

== History and concept ==
Aerial Pandemonium Ballet (1971) by Harry Nilsson is credited as the first remix album. It was released after the successes of "Everybody's Talkin'" and The Point!, when he decided that his older material had started to sound dated. Neu!'s Neu! 2 (1973) has also been described as "in effect the first remix album", as many tracks see the duo "speed up, slow down, cut, doctor, and mutilate the material, sometimes beyond recognition".

In the 1980s, record companies would combine several kinds of electronic dance music, such as dance-pop, house, and techno into full-length albums, creating a relatively low-overhead addition to the catalogs and balance sheets. Soft Cell's Non Stop Ecstatic Dancing (1982) and The Human League's Love and Dancing (1982) are credited for inventing the modern remix album. Since this time, this kind of release is not only seen as an easy cash-in for an artist and their label, but also as an opportunity to provide a second lease of life for a record. In reggae music, it is very common for a whole album to be remixed in a dub style.

Jennifer Lopez's album J to tha L–O! The Remixes (2002) is listed in the Guinness Book of World Records as the first remix album to debut at No.1 on the Billboard 200 chart.

== List of best-selling remix albums ==
Best-selling remix albums worldwide
No.	Album	Artist	Record label	Released	Total certified units (from available markets) (Note: Certification systems have been established periodically throughout the past half century; thus, certification databases are not able to cover all sales. Some (or all) records released and sold prior to a certification system's establishment year may not be found within the available searchable certification databases. Year of establishment (from largest market to smallest based on Retail Value each market generates respectively): United States: 1958; Japan: 1989; Germany: 1975; United Kingdom: 1973; France: 1973; Canada: 1975; Australia: 1997 (online certification-database has begun since 1997. Certifications; however, existed in Australia since the 1970s); Brazil: 1990; Netherlands: 1978; Italy: 2009 (online certification-database covers certifications issued since 2009. Certifications; however, have existed in Italy since the 1990s); Spain: 1979; Sweden: 1987; Denmark: 2001 (online certifications for Denmark start from 2001. Certifications; however, existed in Denmark since the early 1990s); Switzerland: 1989; Mexico: 1999; Argentina: 1980; Belgium: 1995; Austria: 1990; Poland: 1995; Finland: 1971; Ireland: 2005; New Zealand: July 1978; Certified sales might sometimes be larger than actual sales, if stores order more albums than they are able to sell, due to certifications generally being determined by shipments and not actual sales. Often, however, actual sales are larger than certified sales, since record labels must pay a fee to obtain certifications. Record companies often apply for certifications only when a record reaches a multiple certification-levels, meaning certifications might not be visible in the databases for more than a short period of time after an album reached a certification level. As global music sales declined in the 2000s mostly due to CD burning and downloading from unauthorized sites, certification bodies opted to reduce their certification levels. See the changes in Certification-award-levels in the following markets: United States (Note, U.S. certification-award-levels for singles before 1989 were: 1,000,000 for Gold and 2,000,000 for Platinum. Also, U.S. certification-awards for Shortform albums before September 1996 were: 250,000 for Gold and 500,000 for Platinum); Japan; Germany; United Kingdom; France; Canada (Canadian certification-award-levels for singles before February 1982 were: 75,000 for Gold and 150,000 for Platinum); Brazil; Netherlands; Italy; Spain; Sweden; Denmark; Switzerland; Mexico; Argentina; Belgium; Austria: Poland; Finland; New Zealand: (NZ certification-levels for singles before 1989 were: 10,000 for Gold, 20,000 for Platinum) (NZ certification-levels for singles before June 2007 were: 5,000 for Gold, 10,000 for Platinum) (The levels for singles were adjusted again on 17 June 2016 from previous 7,500 for Gold, 15,000 for Platinum, to 15,000 for Gold, 30,000 for Platinum))	Claimed sales (At least 500,000 sold)
1	Blood on the Dance Floor: HIStory in the Mix	Michael Jackson	Epic Records	1997	2,775,000: US: 1,000,000; JPN: 100,000; GER: 250,000; UK: 100,000; FRA: 300,000; CAN: 50,000; AUS: 70,000; AUT: 25,000; BRA: 100,000; NLD: 100,000; ITA: 50,000; SPA: 100,000; DEN: 100,000; SWI: 50,000; BEL: 50,000; POL: 50,000; FIN: 20,000; HKG: 20,000; NOR: 25,000; NZ: 15,000	6,000,000
2	You Can Dance	Madonna	Sire Records	1987	2,305,000: US: 1,000,000; GER: 250,000; UK: 300,000; FRA: 300,000; AUS: 70,000; HK: 20,000; BRA: 100,000; POR: 20,000; SWI: 25,000; ARG: 30,000; NLD: 50,000; SPA: 100,000; SWI: 25,000; NZ: 15,000	5,000,000
3	Love	The Beatles	Apple Records	2006	4,132,500: US: 2,000,000; JPN: 250,000; ARG: 20,000; GER: 300,000; UK: 600,000; FRA: 200,000; CAN: 200,000; AUS: 140,000; NLD: 35,000; SPA: 160,000; DEN: 80,000; SWI: 30,000; BEL: 25,000; POL: 20,000; NZ: 15,000; GRE: 7,500; IRE: 45,000; MEX: 50,000	5,000,000
4	Reanimation	Linkin Park	Warner Bros. Records	2002	1,597,500: US: 1,000,000; GER: 150,000; UK: 300,000; AUS: 35,000; BRA: 50,000; SWI: 20,000; NZ: 7,500; AUT: 15,000; ARG: 20,000	
5	J to tha L–O! The Remixes	Jennifer Lopez	Epic Records	2002	1,582,500: US: 1,000,000; UK: 300,000; FRA: 100,000; CAN: 100,000; AUS: 35,000; NLD: 40,000; NZ: 7,500	3,000,000
6	Super Eurobeat Presents Ayu-ro Mix	Ayumi Hamasaki	Avex Trax	2000	1,200,000: JAP: 1,200,000	
7	Shut Up and Dance: Mixes	Paula Abdul	Virgin Records	1990	1,107,500: US: 1,100,000; CAN: 100,000; NZ: 7,500	1,000,000
8	We Invented the Remix	P. Diddy	Bad Boy Records	2002	1,100,000: US: 1,000,000; UK: 100,000	
9	Never Say Never: The Remixes	Justin Bieber	Island Records	2011	1,040,000: US: 1,000,000; BRA: 40,000	
10	Dance!...Ya Know It!	Bobby Brown	MCA Records	1989	1,007,500: US: 1,000,000; NZ: 7,500	
11	No More Games/The Remix Album	New Kids on the Block	Columbia Records	1990	1,000,000: US: 500,000; JPN: 100,000; CAN: 200,000; AUT: 25,000; BRA: 100,000; SPA: 50,000; FIN: 20,000	
12	Misia Remix 2000 Little Tokyo	Misia	Arista Records	2000	800,000: JAP: 800,000	831,000
13	Further Down the Spiral	Nine Inch Nails	Nothing Records	1995	600,000: US: 500,000; UK: 100,000	
14	Ayu-mi-x II Version Non-Stop Mega Mix	Ayumi Hamasaki	Avex Trax	2000	400,000: JPN: 400,000	505,000
15	Disco	Pet Shop Boys	Parlophone	1986	550,000: GER: 250,000; UK: 100,000	
16	New Old Songs	Limp Bizkit	Interscope Records	2001	500,000: US: 500,000	
17	Eu e Memê, Memê e Eu	Lulu Santos	BMG Brasil	2000	500,000: BRA: 500,000	
18	The Remix	Lady Gaga	Interscope Records	2010	405,000: JPN: 250,000; BRA: 40,000; BEL: 15,000; UK: 100,000	500,000
19	The Remixes	Shakira	Sony Music	1997	200,000: US: 200,000	500,000
20	Todas as Estações - Remixes	Sandy & Junior	Universal Music Group	2000	250,000: BRA: 250,000	500,000

== See also ==
- Dub music
- List of best-selling music artists
