= Getz Au Go Go =

Album by Stan Getz

Live album by the New Stan Getz Quartet featuring Astrud Gilberto
- Released: Mid December 1964
- Recorded: May 22 and October 9, 1964
- Venue: Café Au Go Go, New York City; Carnegie Hall, New York City
- Genre: Latin jazz
- Length: 39:04
- Label: Verve; V6-8600
- Producer: Creed Taylor

Getz Au Go Go is a live album by American saxophonist Stan Getz and his quartet, featuring bossa nova singer Astrud Gilberto. It was recorded during two concerts in 1964 and released on Verve the same year as V6-8600.

Professional ratings
Review scores
Source	Rating
AllMusic	4/5 stars
The Penguin Guide to Jazz Recordings	3/4 stars
The Rolling Stone Jazz Record Guide	3/5 stars

== Track listing ==
1. "Corcovado" (Antônio Carlos Jobim) – 2:51
2. "It Might as Well Be Spring" (Richard Rodgers, Oscar Hammerstein II) – 4:27
3. "Vocé e Eu" (Carlos Lyra, Vinicius de Moraes) – 2:32
4. "Summertime" (George Gershwin, Ira Gershwin) – 8:11
5. "6-Nix-Pix-Flix" (Gary Burton) – 1:05
6. "Only Trust Your Heart" (Benny Carter, Sammy Cahn) – 4:41
7. "The Singing Song" (Gary Burton) – 3:46
8. "The Telephone Song" (Roberto Menescal, Ronaldo Bôscoli, Norman Gimbel) – 1:57
9. "One Note Samba" (Jobim, Newton Mendonca) – 3:19
10. "Here's That Rainy Day" (Jimmy Van Heusen, Johnny Burke) – 6:15

Tracks 4–7 and 9–10 recorded on May 22, 1964, at the Cafe Au Go Go, New York City. Tracks 1–3 and 8 recorded on October 9, 1964, at Carnegie Hall, New York City.

== Personnel ==
- Stan Getz – tenor saxophone
- Astrud Gilberto – vocals (1–3, 6, 8–9)
- Gary Burton – vibes
- Kenny Burrell – guitar (1–3, 8)
- Gene Cherico (1–3, 5–8); Chuck Israels (4, 9–10) – bass
- Helcio Milito (1–3, 8); Joe Hunt (4–7, 9–10) – drums
