= Windy (album) =

Studio album by Astrud Gilberto
- Released: 1968
- Recorded: 26 April – 14 May 1968
- Genre: Bossa nova, vocal jazz
- Length: 28:09
- Label: Verve
- Producer: Pete Spargo

Astrud Gilberto chronology
Beach Samba (1967)	Windy (1968)	I Haven't Got Anything Better to Do (1969)

Windy is a 1968 studio album by Astrud Gilberto, arranged by Eumir Deodato, Don Sebesky, and Patrick Williams.

== Reception ==
Professional ratings
Review scores
Source	Rating
AllMusic	3.5/5 stars

The AllMusic review by Jason Ankney awarded the album three and a half stars and said that the album "proves one of Astrud Gilberto's most consistent and sublime efforts, artfully straddling the division between Brazilian bossa nova and American sunshine pop...the songs possess a lithe, shimmering beauty that perfectly complements Gilberto's feathery vocals". Ankeny reserves criticism for "the cloying sweetness that undermines so many of her mid-period Verve LPs", highlighting the duet with her son Marcelo on "The Bare Necessities".

== Track listing ==
1. "Dreamy" (Luiz Bonfá) – 2:05
2. "Chup, Chup, I Got Away" (Marcos Valle) – 2:09
3. "Never My Love" (Don and Dick Addrisi) – 2:53
4. "Lonely Afternoon" (Robert Maxwell, Patrick Williams) – 3:25
5. "On My Mind" (Eumir Deodato, Norman Gimbel) – 2:44
6. "The Bare Necessities" (Terry Gilkyson) – 2:37
7. "Windy" (Ruthann Friedman) – 2:49
8. "Sing Me a Rainbow" (Estelle Levitt, Lou Stallman) – 2:11
9. "In My Life" (John Lennon, Paul McCartney) – 2:29
10. "Crickets Sing for Anamaria" (Marcos Valle) – 1:36
11. "Where Are They Now?" (Bradford Craig, Ty Whitney) – 3:11

== Personnel ==
- Astrud Gilberto – vocals
- Marcelo Gilberto – vocals on "The Bare Necessities"
- Patrick Williams – arranger, conductor (on track 4)
- Eumir Deodato – arranger, conductor (on tracks 1, 2, 5 and 7)
- Don Sebesky – arranger, conductor (on tracks 3, 6, 8, 9 and 11)

Production

- Acy Lehman – art direction
- Howard Terpening – cover art
- Val Valentin – director, director of engineering
- Phil Ramone – engineer
- Dave Sanders
- Diane Judge – liner notes
- Pete Spargo – Record producer
- David Greene – remixing
