= Ten Little Indians (Harry Nilsson song) =

1967 single by Harry Nilsson

Song by Harry Nilsson

from the album Pandemonium Shadow Show
- Released: 1967
- Length: 2:36
- Songwriter(s): Harry Nilsson
- Producer(s): Rick Jarrard

"Ten Little Indians" is a song by Harry Nilsson released on his 1967 album Pandemonium Shadow Show.

Written in the style of a nursery rhyme, this song is about the Ten Commandments.

== The Yardbirds' adaptation ==
"Ten Little Indians"

Single by the Yardbirds
- B-side: "Drinking Muddy Water"
- Released: October 9, 1967
- Recorded: September 25, 1967
- Studio: Olympic, London
- Genre: Psychedelic rock; experimental rock
- Length: 2:14
- Label: Epic (5-10248)
- Songwriter(s): Harry Nilsson
- Producer(s): Mickie Most

The Yardbirds singles chronology
"Ha Ha Said the Clown" (1967)	"Ten Little Indians" (1967)	"Goodnight Sweet Josephine" (1968)

The Yardbirds recorded "Ten Little Indians" for their second-to-last single on September 25, 1967. The song was a further departure from their earlier recorded material, which had begun when Mickie Most became the group's producer. They follow Nilsson's arrangement, but with Jimmy Page's guitar work, the tune has a more psychedelic- or experimental- rock sound. Only singer Keith Relf and Page perform, with studio musicians John Paul Jones on bass and Clem Cattini on drums (Yardbirds' Chris Dreja and Jim McCarty were left out). Jones also provided the orchestral arrangement and Page employs an audio effect known as reverse echo.

In the US, where the Yardbirds still had a strong live performance presence, the song was released as a single with "Drinking Muddy Water", a tribute/spin-off to Muddy Waters' "Rollin' and Tumblin'" (from the Little Games album) as the B-side. The single was the group's last to reach Billboard magazine's Hot 100, appearing at number 96. The song was later included on the popular Yardbirds' bootleg Golden Eggs (1975), the expanded Little Games Sessions & More (1992), and the comprehensive career retrospective Ultimate! (2001).

In an album review of Sessions and More, AllMusic critic Dave Thompson describes the Yardbirds' rendition as "what was otherwise a preposterous addition to the Yardbirds' repertoire is, in fact, the most fascinating track on the entire album." Thompson, Yardbirds' chronicler Gregg Russo, and music critic Cub Koda each note Page's inventive multitracked feedback guitar parts as a major contribution to the recording.

== Chart positions ==
=== Yardbirds single ===
Chart (1967)	Peak position
Canada RPM	50
US Billboard Hot 100 Singles Chart (Pop Singles)	96
US Cash Box Top 100 Singles Chart	71

== See also ==
Ten Little Indians (minstrel song)
