= September 17, 1969 =

Studio album by Astrud Gilberto
- Released: 1970
- Recorded: September 17, 1969
- Studio: Century Sound, New York City, New York
- Genre: Latin, jazz, bossa nova
- Length: 42:03
- Label: Verve
- Producer: Brooks Arthur

Astrud Gilberto chronology
I Haven't Got Anything Better to Do (1968)	September 17, 1969 (1970)	Gilberto With Turrentine (1971)

Professional ratings
Review scores
Source	Rating
AllMusic	3/5 stars
The Encyclopedia of Popular Music	2/5 stars

September 17, 1969, released in the UK as Holiday, is a studio album by Brazilian bossa nova singer Astrud Gilberto, released on Verve Records in 1969. The album was recorded at Century Sound Studios, New York City, New York. The album cover photograph was taken by Don Martin at 399 E 43rd Street, Manhattan, New York City.

== Reception ==
The AllMusic review says that "Highlights do crop up, with the opener 'Beginnings' working very well except for its long coda, and the one Brazilian song, 'Let Go (Canto de Ossanha)' charting the perfect balance between timeless pop and late-'60s crossover appeal." Stereo Review called the material "flawless," writing that all the songs are "first-rate."

== Track listing ==
1. "Beginnings" – 8:08
2. "Holiday" – 3:12
3. "Here, There and Everywhere" – 2:26
4. "Light My Fire" – 2:57
5. "Let Go (Canto de Ossanha)" – 3:07
6. "Let's Have the Morning After (Instead of the Night Before)" – 4:09
7. "Think of Rain" – 2:48
8. "A Million Miles Away Behind the Door" – 2:29
9. "Love Is Stronger Far Than We" – 3:44
10. "Don't Leave Me Baby" – 2:32
11. "Summer Sweet, Pts. 1–2 to Be Continued" – 6:31

== Personnel ==
- Bill LaVorgna, Al Rogers - Drums
- Benny Aranoff, Stan Free, Paul Griffin, Frank Owens - Keyboards
- Sal DiTroia - Guitars
- Joe Mack (Joe Macho, Jr.), Julio Ruggiero - Bass
- Burt Collins, Joseph Shepley - Flugelhorn
- Mickey Gravine - Trombone
- Joseph Haber, Harry Lookofsky, Louis Stone, Paul Winter - Violin
- Seymour Berman, Archie Levin - Viola
- Maurice Bialkin, Harry Wimmer - Cello
- Leon S. Cohen, Joseph Ferrantello, Selden Powell - Saxophone
- Robert Gregg, Airto Moreira - Percussion
- Brooks Arthur, Frankie Callen, Ron Dante, Gene Maharrey, Linda November, Maeretha Stewart, David White - Background Vocals
