= Astrud Gilberto =

Brazilian singer (1940–2023)

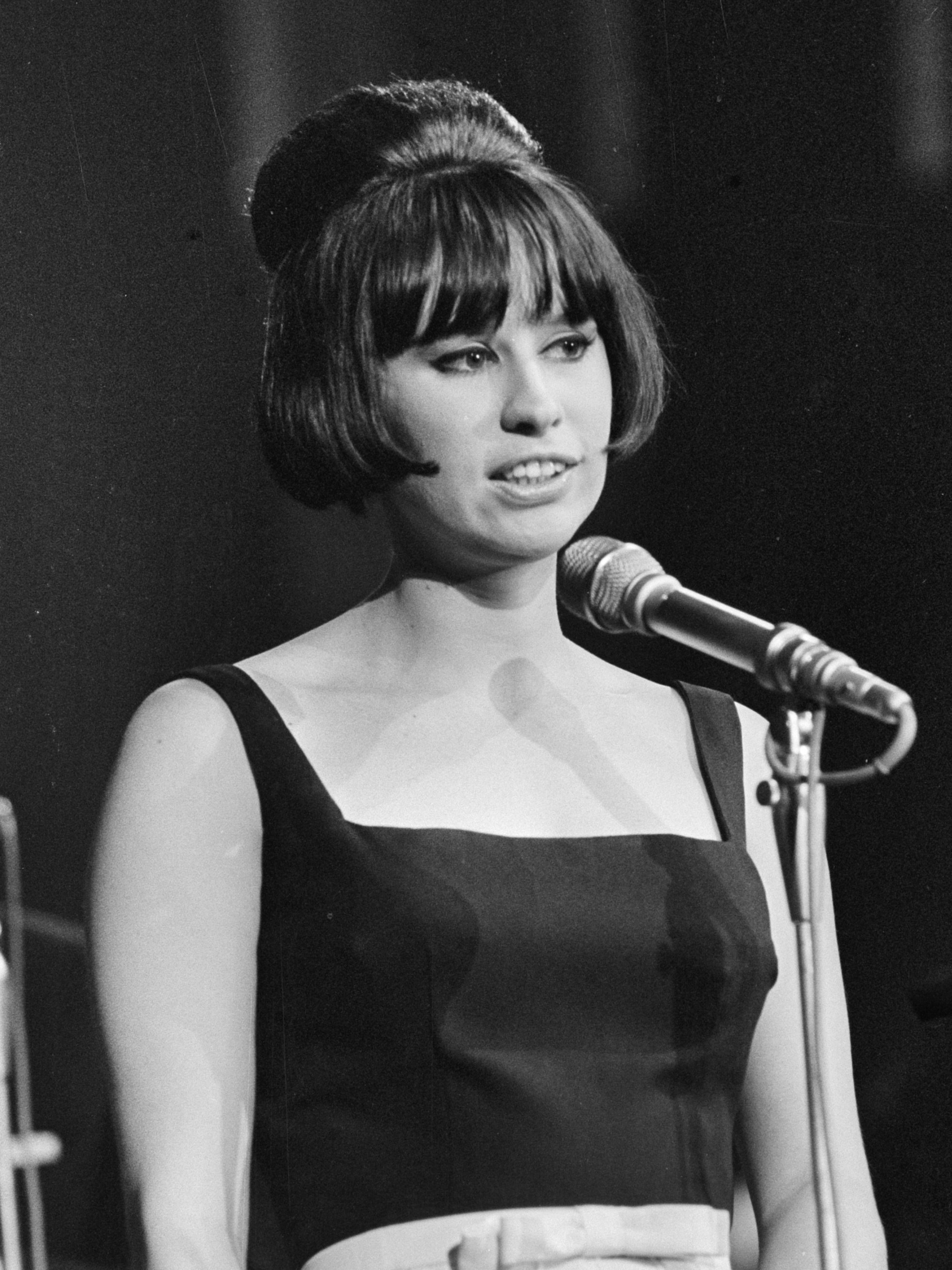
- Gilberto performing in 1966

Background information
- Born: Astrud Evangelina Weinert; March 29, 1940; Salvador, Bahia, Brazil
- Died: June 5, 2023 (aged 83) Philadelphia, Pennsylvania, U.S.
- Genres: Bossa nova; Brazilian jazz; samba; jazz; MPB
- Occupations: Singer; songwriter; artist
- Years active: 1963–2002
- Labels: Verve; CTI; Perception; Pony Canyon
- Formerly of: João Gilberto, Stan Getz
- Spouse(s): João Gilberto (m. 1959; div. 1964) Nick Lasorsa (m. ca. 1966 – sep. ca. 1979)
- Website: astrudgilberto.com

Astrud Gilberto (Portuguese: [asˈtɾud ʒiwˈbɛʁtu]; born Astrud Evangelina Weinert; March 29, 1940 – June 5, 2023) was a Brazilian and American bossa nova and samba singer. She was the first wife of Brazilian bossa nova guitarist João Gilberto, whose surname she continued to use professionally after their divorce in 1964. She gained international attention in the mid-1960s following her vocal contribution to the song "The Girl from Ipanema", which was awarded a Grammy in 1965. Astrud Gilberto went on to be a popular bossa nova singer in the United States and internationally, being particularly popular in Japan. Although the best-known part of her career was from the mid-1960s to the early 1970s, she had a singing career spanning over 30 years before retiring, following the release of her last album in 2002. Because of her contributions to popularizing bossa nova, many of her fans have given her the nickname "Queen of Bossa Nova".

== Early life ==
Astrud Gilberto was born Astrud Evangelina Weinert on March 29, 1940, in Salvador, Bahia. She was one of three daughters of a Brazilian mother, Evangelina Weinert (née Lobão), and a German immigrant father, Fritz Weinert. The naming of Astrud and her sisters Eda and Iduna were inspired by Germanic mythology. Her father was a language teacher and taught German and English, and she became fluent in several languages. He also had a minor reputation as a painter. Her mother played several instruments and ensured that Astrud was musically educated. In 1947, the family relocated to Rio de Janeiro, residing on the Avenida Atlântica in the Copacabana district. In her late teens, she studied at Rio's demanding Colégio de Aplicação.

By the late 1950s, she was part of a social circle of bohemian youths who made up the nascent bossa nova scene in Rio. In 1959, she met the Brazilian musician João Gilberto through a friend, the singer Nara Leão, though other versions of the story say that it was Ronaldo Bôscoli who introduced João to Astrud at Leão's apartment, in a deliberate attempt to play matchmaker. She was not impressed with him at first, but his singing and her own ambitions to become a singer won her over (not to mention that Astrud's mother was star-struck, considering him to be the greatest singer ever) and in early 1960 she married João. The couple settled in an apartment on Rua Visconde de Pirajá in Ipanema, where they soon awaited the birth of their son João Marcelo (b. 1960; full name João Gilberto Prado Pereira de Oliveira).

Astrud and João Gilberto frequently sang together at social gatherings, however, she had never performed on stage. Her debut public performance was at Brazil's watershed bossa nova music festival, A noite do amor, do sorriso e da flor (The Night of Love, the Smile, and the Flower), held on May 20, 1960. The festival took its name from João Gilberto's just-released album O Amor, o Sorriso e a Flor, which in turn was taken from the lyrics of Antônio Carlos Jobim and Newton Mendonça's song "Meditação". The festival was held at the Faculdade de Arquitetura amphitheater (today the Teatro de Arena Carvalho Netto) on the UFRJ Praia Vermelha campus, and attracted an audience of 3000 people. The billing included numerous stars of the still-young bossa nova scene, with João Gilberto headlining. Astrud performed two songs alongside her husband, "Lamento" and "Brigas Nunca Mais", singing the lead vocals with João playing guitar and lending vocal harmonies. The performance was well received by the audience.

== The Girl from Ipanema ==
João Gilberto had begun touring in the United States in 1962. A landmark bossa nova concert at Carnegie Hall on November 21, 1962 led to an invitation for João and Antônio Carlos Jobim to record an album with Stan Getz in New York City for the Verve label. Astrud joined João on this trip, acting as his interpreter, as he spoke no English. The recording sessions took place on March 18-19, 1963. On the second day of the recording, Norman Gimbel handed producer Creed Taylor English-language lyrics for "The Girl from Ipanema", a rough translation of the lyrics for the Jobim and Vinicius de Moraes composition "Garota de Ipanema". After considering and dismissing the idea of recording the song separately as a Sarah Vaughan vehicle, Taylor settled on the idea of adding English-language vocals to the recording alongside João's Portuguese ones to enhance its marketability for an American audience.

Accounts vary as to exactly how Astrud was selected as vocalist on "The Girl from Ipanema". It is generally agreed that João was unable to sing in English and Getz was not interested in performing the vocals. According to Astrud Gilberto's own account, João said that he had a "surprise" in store for her during the session that day, and later had her sing the English lyrics during the first day's rehearsal, after which Stan Getz enthusiastically concurred on having her sing on the recording. However, according to the account given by bossa nova historian Ruy Castro, the idea was Astrud's, with João at first being hesitant about it, but warmed up to the idea after hearing her sing the lyrics. Other accounts claim Getz or Taylor had the idea to have Astrud sing, sometimes with the added claim that they had "discovered" her. Once the song was recorded, Taylor and Getz found Astrud's accented and somewhat naive-sounding delivery to fit the theme of the song perfectly, with Getz dramatically telling Astrud, "This song is going to make you famous".

Based on the success of this recording, Taylor also had Astrud sing the English-language passage on an additional track, "Corcovado". In spite of being pleased with the album they had just recorded, Taylor, perceiving a glut of new bossa nova albums on the American market, delayed release of the album. It would finally be released a year after it was recorded, in March 1964, under the title Getz/Gilberto.

In the interim between the recording and release of the album, Astrud and João's marriage began falling apart. After accompanying her husband for part of his European tour in the summer of 1963, she returned alone to Rio in October. João, who was suffering from a muscular atrophy in his right shoulder that was making it increasingly difficult to play guitar, traveled to Paris to consult with an acupuncturist there. While in Paris, he took up with Heloísa Buarque (known professionally as Miúcha), a Brazilian student and sometimes singer then living in France. Initially hiring Buarque as his secretary, their involvement soon became a full-blown affair, which led to the couple's formal separation.

Getz/Gilberto was released in March 1964, a year after it had been recorded, and was a major contributor to the already growing-popularity of bossa nova beyond Brazil. The production was financially successful for Stan Getz and João Gilberto: Getz made enough to buy a 20-room house, and João received $23,000 (about $240,000 in 2025 dollars) as his first royalties after the release in early 1964. However, Gene Lees relates in his memoir that Getz contacted producer Creed Taylor and demanded that Astrud was to be paid no royalties. She reportedly received a flat payment $120 for the recording (about $1250 in 2025 dollars), which was the usual fee for musicians for an evening's performance at the time. Astrud Gilberto, is mentioned by name only in the cover text, but not listed among the musicians.

Her whispery voice and steadfast approach to singing played a significant role in popularizing "The Girl from Ipanema", which earned the album a Grammy Award for Record of the Year and Astrud Gilberto a Grammy nomination for Best Vocal Performance by a Female. The 1964 edited single of "The Girl from Ipanema" omitted the Portuguese lyrics sung by João Gilberto, and established Astrud Gilberto as a bossa nova singer. It sold over one million copies and was awarded a gold disc. Unlike her billing on Getz/Gilberto as a guest vocalist, she was given full performer credits on the single.

== Tour with Stan Getz and end of marriage ==
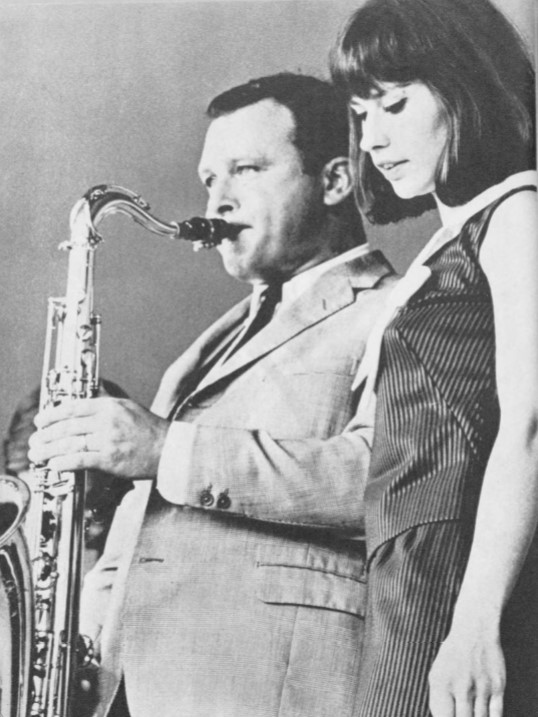
Stan Getz and Astrud Gilberto, 1964

Stan Getz, in spite of denying her any royalties for the recording, was enthusiastic about her performance on Getz/Gilberto and asked her to sing for his band. She relocated to the United States, as it would turn out, permanently. Initially hired to appear with Getz for a two-week engagement at the Carter Barron Amphitheatre in Washington, DC, the gig was extended to a six-month engagement in which she toured extensive with Getz through 1964. A live album from the tour, Getz Au Go Go, was released the same year, with Gilberto contributing vocals to most tracks. Gilberto and Getz also made musical appearances that same year in two films, the beach party movie Get Yourself a College Girl and the made-for-television crime drama The Hanged Man.

The recently-separated Astrud Gilberto and the married Getz began an affair while on tour together in 1964, which was reported on extensively by the Brazilian press. She later regretted her decision to tour with Getz, who mistreated her, and stated that she had done so because of dire financial need in the wake of her separation. She described the experience as "tortuous [sic]" and that the contract she had signed with Getz paid her only a "slave salary". In December 1964, during the week before Christmas, their professional and personal collaboration would end when Gilberto's complaints about her paltry wages ended in a shouting match between the two.

Astrud and João Gilberto were finally divorced in December 1964, (Note: Following João Gilberto's death in 2019, Astrud and João's son João Marcelo Gilberto claimed on social media and in interviews that the couple had "merely separated" in 1964 and were never officially divorced (sometimes specifying that they were never divorced in Brazil) and that Astrud was João Gilberto's legal heir.) with the split officially announced at a specially arranged meeting and press conference by the newly-divorced couple, which took place on December 28, 1964 in Mexico. João also took the opportunity to announce his impending marriage to Miúcha. The two would marry in 1965, and as had been the case with Astrud Gilberto, João and Miúcha would eventually begin performing together and Miúcha would go on to become a successful singer in her own right. At the press conference, Astrud also stated that there was no truth to the rumors about a relationship with Frank Sinatra, and that she and Stan Getz were now going their separate ways, although they maintained a "good friendship".

In spite of the falling out with Stan Getz, the two later toured together again on two occasions. In 1966, they agreed to reunite for a European tour. Old tensions quickly resurfaced, and Gilberto demanded and received from the tour's promoter her own backing band with a separate set from Getz's band. In 1983, she would tour with Stan Getz again, with her own backing band and set, but joining Getz's band for an encore set.

== Solo career ==
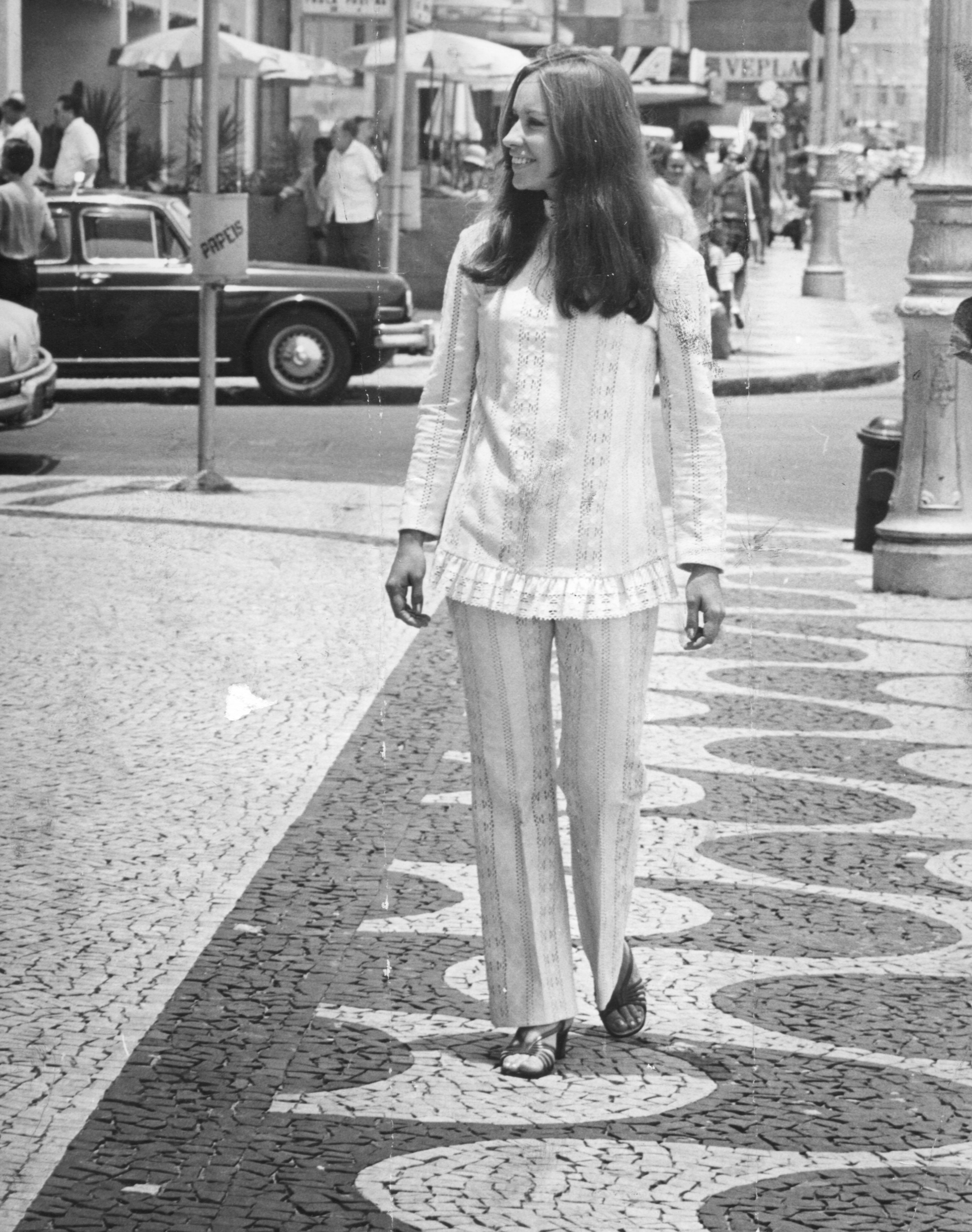
Gilberto in 1970

Her first solo album was The Astrud Gilberto Album (1965) on Verve Records. She would go on to record eight more albums for the label by 1970. Beginning as a singer of bossa nova and American jazz standards, Gilberto branched out stylistically in the 1970s, with her album Now (1972) featuring more contemporary música popular brasileira and tropicália influences, covering artists such as Jorge Ben and Milton Nascimento. Through her career, she would record songs in Portuguese, English, Spanish, Italian, French, German, and Japanese.

In 1965, she performed in São Paulo, her first performance in Brazil since relocating to the United States. She was well-received by her audience, but the Brazilian press treated her harshly. Gilberto never performed again in Brazil after this, though she's also stated that she continued to enjoy visiting Brazil as an incognito traveler rather than as a performer.

In 1966, she married Nick Lasorsa, a widowed Philadelphia bar owner, with whom she had a second son, Gregory Lasorsa, settling in Lower Merion Township in the Philadelphia Main Line suburbs. Gilberto resided on and off in the Philadelphia area for the remainder of her life, though she lived in New York City during much of the 1980s and 1990s. After her marriage, she scaled back her touring and live appearances, and those performances were more often in Europe and Japan than the United States. Most offers she received from the United States were for nightclub gigs, which was a venue she did not want to perform in at the time. However, she continued a steady album release schedule into the early 1970s.

== Career hiatus ==
Following the release of Now in 1972, her album releases and live performances became more sporadic, and she was largely inactive in music for much of the mid- to late-1970s. In a later interview, she said that during this period there was an approximately six-year period where she did not sing at all, and had transitioned into raising her children and living the life of a suburban housewife.

Nevertheless, she recorded an album in 1977 (released in 1978), That Girl from Ipanema. The album features a disco version of "The Girl from Ipanema", as well as "Far Away", a duet with Chet Baker. The album failed to chart and did not restart her career.

In a 1982 interview, she said that married life was easy at first because of her self-described submissiveness, but became more difficult as she "Americanized" and became more independent and assertive. She eventually separated from Lasorsa at the end of the 1970s, and the two were later divorced.

== Later career ==
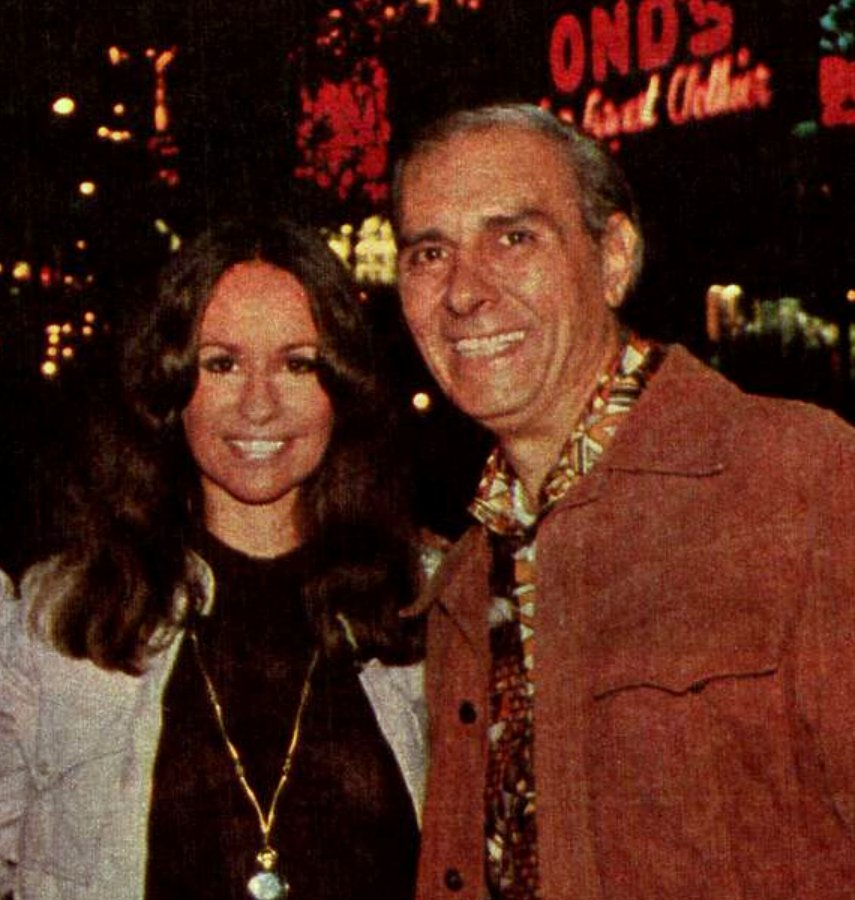
Astrud Gilberto and husband Nick Lasorsa in 1974

In 1980, following her separation, she overcame her aversion to performing at nightclubs and began performing on the club circuit, especially in New York City, as well as at jazz festivals. She referred to this period as her "third life" and relocated to New York City, buying an apartment in West Village and living there for most of the 1980s and 1990s.

In 1983, she collaborated with Japanese jazz trombonist Shigeharu Mukai for the album So & So: Mukai Meets Gilberto, initially released only in Japan. In 1986, she collaborated with German big band leader James Last on the album Plus (Released in the United States as Astrud Gilberto Plus James Last Orchestra).

In 1982, Gilberto's son Marcelo joined her group, touring with her for more than a decade as a bassist. He also served as her road manager, sound technician and personal assistant. In 1990 Gilberto and her two sons, João Marcelo and Gregory Lasorsa, together established Gregmar Productions, Inc., a production company aimed at promoting Gilberto's music and developing new material.

In 1996, she made several guest appearances with other artists, singing duets. The first was with George Michael at his invitation, performing the bossa nova standard "Desafinado" on the AIDS benefit album Red Hot + Rio. She also sang a bilingual (in French and Portuguese) duet, "Les bords de Seine", with singer Étienne Daho on his album, Eden. That same year, Pony Canyon, a Japanese label, issued a live album, Live in New York, followed by a studio album, Temperance, in 1997. Her son Gregory Lasorsa played guitar on one of the songs from the album, "Beautiful You".

Gilberto's last foray into music was the 2002 album Jungle, released on her own label, Magya Productions.

== Retirement ==
In 2002, Gilberto announced that she was taking "indefinite time off" from public performances. In her later life, she was sometimes described as a recluse, a label she disputed, saying that she was simply someone who had a high regard for her privacy. A 2003 message posted to her website included the statement, "I’m not sure when or even if I will resume performing again, as I am enjoying a quieter life style these days, after 37 years of performing and traveling." Gregory Lasorsa notes about her later life, "...once she stopped being an artist, she never wanted to be in the public eye again. She didn’t want to be Astrud Gilberto anymore." Her website noted that she was "not available for any interviews of any kind, as a result of a long standing policy adopted by the artist."

In the early 2000s, Gilberto put together a website to stay in touch with her fanbase. Her website devoted a notable portion of its content to animal rights advocacy. She also briefly sold original artwork via the website. Updates to the website were infrequent after the mid-2000s.

Astrud Gilberto died at home in Philadelphia, on June 5, 2023, aged 83.

== Awards ==
At the 7th Grammy Awards in 1965, the album Getz/Gilberto was awarded "Album of the Year". However, the award went to Stan Getz and João Gilberto. For the single "The Girl from Ipanema", Astrud Gilberto received the Grammy jointly with Stan Getz. For the 8th Grammy Awards in 1966, she was nominated for, but did not win, the award for Best Female Vocal Performance for The Astrud Gilberto Album.

Gilberto received the Latin Jazz USA Award for Lifetime Achievement in 1992, was inducted into the International Latin Music Hall of Fame in 2002, and was the recipient of the Latin Grammy Lifetime Achievement Award in 2008.

== Selected discography ==
- Getz/Gilberto (Stan Getz and João Gilberto; Verve, 1964. Astrud Gilberto, vocals on two tracks)
- Getz Au Go Go (Stan Getz; Verve, 1964. Astrud Gilberto, vocalist)
- The Astrud Gilberto Album (Verve, 1965)
- The Shadow of Your Smile (Verve, 1965)
- A Certain Smile, a Certain Sadness (with Walter Wanderley; Verve, 1966)
- Look to the Rainbow (with Gil Evans; Verve, 1966)
- Beach Samba (Verve, 1967)
- Windy (Verve, 1968)
- September 17, 1969 (Verve, 1969)
- I Haven't Got Anything Better to Do (Verve, 1969)
- Gilberto Golden Japanese Album (Verve, 1970)
- Gilberto with Turrentine (with Stanley Turrentine; CTI, 1971)
- Now (Perception, 1972)
- That Girl from Ipanema (Image, 1977)
- So & So: Mukai Meets Gilberto (1983)
- Plus (with James Last; Polydor/Verve, 1986)
- Live in New York (Pony Canyon, 1996)
- Temperance (Pony Canyon, 1997)
- Jungle (Magya, 2002)

=== Music in films and use in sampling ===
Gilberto's original recording of "Fly Me to the Moon" was featured with Frank Sinatra's version on the soundtrack of Down with Love (2003). Her recording "Who Can I Turn To?" was sampled by the Black Eyed Peas in the song "Like That" from their 2005 album Monkey Business. Gilberto's vocals on "Berimbau" were sampled by Cut Chemist in his song "The Garden". Her recording of "Once I Loved" was featured in the 2007 film Juno. On Basia's 1987 debut album, Time and Tide, the track "Astrud" is a tribute to her idol Gilberto.

== Notes ==
Sources:
