= 4150 Starr =

Asteroid

Discovery
- Discovered by: B. A. Skiff
- Discovery site: Anderson Mesa Stn.
- Discovery date: 31 August 1984

Designations
- Named after: Richard Starkey (Ringo Starr, The Beatles)
- Alternative designations: 1984 QC_{1} · 1957 KG; 1964 RH · 1973 FD_{2} 1974 QM_{1} · 1980 EA_{2} 1981 TO_{2} · 1981 WE_{6} 1981 WJ_{3} · 1988 YC; 2004 SL_{12}
- Minor planet category: main-belt · Flora

Orbital characteristics
- Epoch 4 September 2017 (JD 2458000.5)
- Uncertainty parameter 0
- Observation arc: 60.02 yr (21,922 days)
- Aphelion: 2.6034 AU
- Perihelion: 1.8620 AU
- Semi-major axis: 2.2327 AU
- Eccentricity: 0.1660
- Orbital period (sidereal): 3.34 yr (1,219 days)
- Mean anomaly: 332.80°
- Mean motion: 0° 17^{m} 43.44^{s} / day
- Inclination: 3.1948°
- Longitude of ascending node: 122.92°
- Argument of perihelion: 197.41°

Physical characteristics
- Dimensions: 6.641±0.032; 6.903±0.050 km 7.47 km (calculated)
- Synodic rotation period: 4.5179±0.0005 h (Note: Kryszczynska (2012a), unpublished data: rotation period 4.5179±0.0005 hours with a brightness amplitude of 0.20 mag. CALL rates the light-curve as well-defined on its quality scheme. Summary figures for (4150) Starr at Collaborative Asteroid Lightcurve Link (CALL)); 6.8 h
- Geometric albedo: 0.24 (assumed); 0.2584±0.0469; 0.277±0.023
- Spectral type: S
- Absolute magnitude (H): 12.50±0.48 · 12.8 · 12.9

4150 Starr, provisional designation 1984 QC_{1}, is a stony Florian asteroid from the inner regions of the asteroid belt, approximately 7 kilometers in diameter. It was discovered by American astronomer Brian Skiff at Lowell's Anderson Mesa Station on 31 August 1984. It was named after musician Ringo Starr.

== Orbit and classification ==
Starr is a member of the Flora family, one of the largest groups of stony asteroids in the main-belt. It orbits the Sun in the inner main-belt at a distance of 1.9–2.6 AU once every 3 years and 4 months (1,219 days). Its orbit has an eccentricity of 0.17 and an inclination of 3° with respect to the ecliptic. The first observation was made at the U.S. Goethe Link Observatory in 1957, extending the asteroid's observation arc by 27 years prior to its discovery.

== Physical characteristics ==
Starr has been characterized as a common S-type asteroid by PanSTARRS' photometric survey.

=== Rotation period ===
According to the space-based survey by the NEOWISE mission of NASA's Wide-field Infrared Survey Explorer, Starr measures 6.6 and 6.9 kilometers in diameter and its surface has an albedo of 0.258 and 0.277, respectively, while the Collaborative Asteroid Lightcurve Link (CALL) assumes an albedo of 0.24 – derived from 8 Flora, the family's largest member and namesake – and calculates a diameter of 7.5 kilometers with an absolute magnitude of 12.8.

=== Diameter and albedo ===
Several rotational lightcurves of Starr were obtained from photometric observations. An unpublished lightcurve by Kryszczynska from November 2011, has been rated best by CALL. It gave a rotation period of 4.5179±0.0005 hours and a brightness variation of 0.20 in magnitude (U=3).

== Naming ==
This minor planet was named after Richard Starkey (born 1940), better known as Ringo Starr, the drummer of The Beatles. He joined the English rock band in 1962, replacing its former drummer Pete Best. Ringo has released various albums in his solo career and also acted in several movies. The official naming citation was published by the Minor Planet Center on 10 April 1990 (M.P.C. 16248). The minor planets 8749 Beatles, 4147 Lennon, 4148 McCartney and 4149 Harrison were named after the band and its three other members.
