= 4149 Harrison =

Main-belt asteroid

Discovery
- Discovered by: B. A. Skiff
- Discovery site: Anderson Mesa Stn.
- Discovery date: 9 March 1984

Designations
- Named after: George Harrison (guitarist, The Beatles)
- Alternative designations: 1984 EZ
- Minor planet category: main-belt · Eunomia

Orbital characteristics
- Epoch 4 September 2017 (JD 2458000.5)
- Uncertainty parameter 0
- Observation arc: 39.32 yr (14,360 days)
- Aphelion: 2.9955 AU
- Perihelion: 2.3356 AU
- Semi-major axis: 2.6655 AU
- Eccentricity: 0.1238
- Orbital period (sidereal): 4.35 yr (1,590 days)
- Mean anomaly: 204.95°
- Mean motion: 0° 13^{m} 35.4^{s} / day
- Inclination: 12.923°
- Longitude of ascending node: 154.73°
- Argument of perihelion: 76.653°

Physical characteristics
- Dimensions: 8.14 km (derived); 10.130±0.081; 10.739±0.042 km
- Synodic rotation period: 3.7490±0.0002 h (Note: Pravec (2015) web: lightcurve plot of (4149) Harrison with a rotation period 3.7490±0.0002 hours with a brightness amplitude of 0.42 mag. G: 0.15±0.2, abs. magnitude: 12.31±0.16, phase: 11.1, PABL: 256.2, and PABB: 17.3. Summary figures at Collaborative Asteroid Lightcurve Link (CALL) and Pravec, P.; Wolf, M.; Sarounova, L. (2015)); 3.956±0.001 h
- Geometric albedo: 0.1856±0.0479; 0.21 (assumed); 0.230±0.035
- Spectral type: S
- Absolute magnitude (H): 12.3 · 12.31±0.16 (R) · 12.54±0.22 · 12.76

4149 Harrison, provisional designation 1984 EZ, is a stony Eunomian asteroid from the middle region of the asteroid belt, approximately 10 kilometers in diameter. The asteroid was discovered on 9 March 1984, by American astronomer Brian Skiff at Lowell's Anderson Mesa Station in Flagstaff, Arizona, and named after musician George Harrison.

== Orbit and classification ==
Harrison is a member of the Eunomia family, a large group of S-type asteroids and the most prominent family in the intermediate main-belt. It orbits the Sun in the central main-belt at a distance of 2.3–3.0 AU once every 4 years and 4 months (1,590 days). Its orbit has an eccentricity of 0.12 and an inclination of 13° with respect to the ecliptic. A first precovery was taken at Palomar Observatory in 1977, extending the body's observation arc by 7 years prior to its discovery.

== Physical characteristics ==
=== Rotation period ===
A rotational lightcurve of Harrison was obtained from photometric observations by Czech astronomer Petr Pravec at Ondřejov Observatory in May 2015. It gave a well-defined rotation period of 3.7490±0.0002 hours with a brightness variation of 0.42 in magnitude (U=3). During the following month, photometric observations at three Italian observatories gave a second lightcurve with a period of 3.956±0.001 hours and an amplitude of 0.37 in magnitude (U=2+).

=== Diameter and albedo ===
According to the survey carried out by the NEOWISE mission of NASA's Wide-field Infrared Survey Explorer, Harrison measures 10.1 and 10.7 kilometers in diameter and its surface has an albedo of 0.19 and 0.23, respectively, while the Collaborative Asteroid Lightcurve Link assumes an albedo of 0.21 – derived from 15 Eunomia, the family's largest member and namesake – and calculates a diameter of 8.1 kilometers with an absolute magnitude of 12.76.

== Naming ==
This minor planet was named in honor of guitarist, singer and songwriter, George Harrison (1943–2001), who was the lead guitarist of the English rock band The Beatles, after which the main-belt asteroid 8749 Beatles is named. The minor planets 4147 Lennon, 4148 McCartney and 4150 Starr honor the other three members of the band. The official naming citation was published by the Minor Planet Center on 10 April 1990 (M.P.C. 16248).
