= 3872 Akirafujii =

Main-belt asteroid

Discovery
- Discovered by: B. A. Skiff
- Discovery site: Anderson Mesa Stn.
- Discovery date: 12 January 1983

Designations
- Named after: Akira Fujii (Japanese astrophotographer)
- Alternative designations: 1983 AV · 1931 AY
- Minor planet category: main-belt · (middle); EunomiaMitidika

Orbital characteristics
- Epoch 4 September 2017 (JD 2458000.5)
- Uncertainty parameter 0
- Observation arc: 86.10 yr (31,447 days)
- Aphelion: 3.2025 AU
- Perihelion: 2.1199 AU
- Semi-major axis: 2.6612 AU
- Eccentricity: 0.2034
- Orbital period (sidereal): 4.34 yr (1,586 days)
- Mean anomaly: 324.03°
- Mean motion: 0° 13^{m} 37.2^{s} / day
- Inclination: 13.042°
- Longitude of ascending node: 94.761°
- Argument of perihelion: 66.126°

Physical characteristics
- Dimensions: 12.538±0.340 km 15.16±1.3 km (IRAS:13); 15.20 km (derived); 21.43±1.51 km
- Synodic rotation period: 10.635 h 22.289±0.003 h
- Geometric albedo: 0.029±0.005; 0.0583±0.011 (IRAS:13); 0.0697 (derived); 0.085±0.012
- Spectral type: C · S (assumed)
- Absolute magnitude (H): 12.44±0.26 · 12.6 · 12.8

3872 Akirafujii, provisional designation 1983 AV, is a carbonaceous Eunomia asteroid from the middle region of the asteroid belt, approximately 15 kilometers in diameter.

The asteroid was discovered on 12 January 1983, by American astronomer Brian Skiff at Lowell's Anderson Mesa Station, near Flagstaff, Arizona. It was later named after Japanese astronomer Akira Fujii.

== Orbit and classification ==
Akirafujii has been identified as a member of the Mitidika family, a dispersed asteroid family of typically carbonaceous C-type asteroids. The family is named after 2262 Mitidika (diameter of 9 km) and consists of 653 known members, the largest ones being 404 Arsinoë (95 km) and 5079 Brubeck (17 km). It has also been described as a member of the Eunomia family, a large group of otherwise predominantly stony asteroids and the most prominent family in the intermediate main-belt.

It orbits the Sun in the central main-belt at a distance of 2.1–3.2 AU once every 4 years and 4 months (1,586 days). Its orbit has an eccentricity of 0.20 and an inclination of 13° with respect to the ecliptic. The first precovery was taken at Lowell Observatory in 1931, extending the asteroid's observation arc by 52 years prior to its discovery.

== Physical characteristics ==
Akirafujii has been characterized as a dark C-type asteroid by PanSTARRS' photometric survey, which agrees with the Mitidika family's overall spectral type.

=== Rotation period ===
In August 2005 and November 2012, two rotational lightcurves were obtained through photometric observations at the Chiro Observatory, Australia, and at the Preston Gott Observatory in Texas, United States, respectively. The ambiguous lightcurve from Chiro Observatory showed a rotation period of 10.635 hours with a brightness variation of 0.35 in magnitude, when using the longer solution (U=2). The other lightcurve at Preston Gott gave a period of 22.289±0.003 hours with an amplitude of 0.23 (U=2-).

=== Diameter and albedo ===
According to the space-based surveys carried out by the Infrared Astronomical Satellite IRAS, the Japanese Akari satellite, and the NEOWISE mission of NASA's Wide-field Infrared Survey Explorer, Akirafujii measures between 12.5 and 21.4 kilometers, and its surface has a low albedo in the range of 0.03 to 0.09.

The Collaborative Asteroid Lightcurve Link (CALL) derives an albedo of 0.07 and calculates a diameter of 15.2 kilometers with an absolute magnitude of 12.6.

== Naming ==
This minor planet was named in honour of Japanese astronomer Akira Fujii (born 1941), a prominent astronomy communicator and astrophotographer at his Chiro Observatory in Shirakawa, Fukushima prefecture. Editor of the "Star Handbook" (Hoshi No Techou) and author of an astronomy book series for young people, Fujii has also publicized astronomy on TV, and he has toured the country during the 1986 apparition of Halley's Comet, encouraging the public to observe it with a 0.6-meter reflector telescope mounted on his trailer. Internationally, Fujii is most famous for his excellent celestial images. The official naming citation was published by the Minor Planet Center on 29 November 1993 (M.P.C. 22829).
