= Akira Fujii =

Japanese astrophotographer (1941–2022)

- Born: 12 January 1941; Yamaguchi Prefecture, Japan
- Died: 28 December 2022 (aged 81)

Akira Fujii (藤井 旭, Fujii Akira; 12 January 1941 – 28 December 2022) was a Japanese astrophotographer and astronomer. PBS has described him as "the world's foremost wide-angle astrophotographer".

Fujii graduated from Tama Art University in 1961, and began working at observatories, producing a substantial bibliography of general-audience astronomy books. In 1974, Fujii began Japan's first star party, the "Invitation to Starlit Skies", which he hosted on Mount Azuma until 1984.

Fujii's work is marketed by David Malin; he collaborated with Serge Brunier in the production of 2001's Great Atlas of the Stars.

The main-belt asteroid 3872 Akirafujii is named in his honor.

Fujii died on 28 December 2022, at the age of 81.
