= 4147 Lennon =

Asteroid

Discovery
- Discovered by: B. A. Skiff
- Discovery site: Anderson Mesa Stn.
- Discovery date: 12 January 1983

Designations
- Named after: John Lennon (musician, The Beatles)
- Alternative designations: 1983 AY · 1971 YG; 1980 KA
- Minor planet category: main-belt · Vestian

Orbital characteristics
- Epoch 4 September 2017 (JD 2458000.5)
- Uncertainty parameter 0
- Observation arc: 44.51 yr (16,258 days)
- Aphelion: 2.5524 AU
- Perihelion: 2.1712 AU
- Semi-major axis: 2.3618 AU
- Eccentricity: 0.0807
- Orbital period (sidereal): 3.63 yr (1,326 days)
- Mean anomaly: 88.732°
- Mean motion: 0° 16^{m} 17.4^{s} / day
- Inclination: 5.7326°
- Longitude of ascending node: 288.57°
- Argument of perihelion: 302.94°

Physical characteristics
- Dimensions: 5.171±0.087 km 7.13±0.37 km 7.46 km (calculated)
- Synodic rotation period: 137 h
- Geometric albedo: 0.20 (assumed); 0.240±0.049; 0.4166±0.0564
- Spectral type: V · S
- Absolute magnitude (H): 12.90 · 13.0 · 13.63±0.34

4147 Lennon, provisional designation 1983 AY, is a stony Vestian asteroid and a potentially slow rotator from the inner regions of the asteroid belt, approximately 7 kilometers in diameter. It was discovered by American astronomer Brian Skiff at Lowell's Anderson Mesa Station on 12 January 1983. It was later named after musician John Lennon.

== Orbit and classification ==
Lennon is a member of the Vesta family, which is named after the main-belt's second largest asteroid, 4 Vesta. It orbits the Sun in the inner main-belt at a distance of 2.2–2.6 AU once every 3 years and 8 months (1,326 days). Its orbit has an eccentricity of 0.08 and an inclination of 6° with respect to the ecliptic. The first observation was made at Crimea–Nauchnij in 1971, extending the asteroid's observation arc by 12 years prior to its discovery.

== Physical characteristics ==
Lennon has been characterized as a V-type asteroid.

=== Slow rotator ===
In October 2004, a rotational lightcurve of Lennon was obtained during a photometric survey of V-type asteroids at several observatories in Japan. The fragmentary lightcurve gave a very long rotation period of 137 hours with a high brightness variation of 0.6 in magnitude (U=1).

=== Diameter and albedo ===
According to the survey carried out by NASA's Wide-field Infrared Survey Explorer with its subsequent NEOWISE mission, Lennon measures 5.2 and 7.1 kilometers in diameter and its surface has an albedo of 0.24 of 0.42, respectively. The Collaborative Asteroid Lightcurve Link assumes a standard albedo for S-type asteroids of 0.20 and calculates a diameter of 7.5 kilometers with an absolute magnitude of 13.0. The discrepancy is due to disagreement on the body's spectral type (V or S).

== Naming ==
This minor planet was named in memory of English musician John Lennon (1940–1980), famous for his song "Imagine" and co-founder of The Beatles, one of the most successful bands in the history of popular music.

The minor planets 8749 Beatles, 4149 Harrison, 4148 McCartney and 4150 Starr, were named after the band and its three other members. The official naming citation was published by the Minor Planet Center on 10 April 1990 (M.P.C. 16247).
