= Brian A. Skiff =

American astronomer

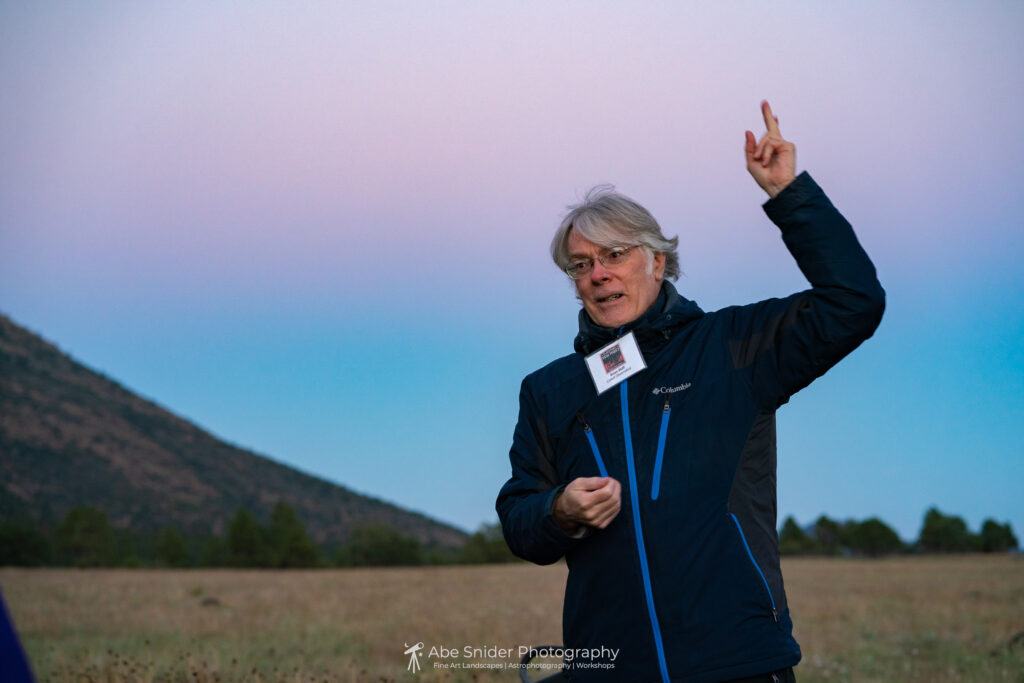
- Skiff in 2022
- Education: Northern Arizona University
- Known for: Minor planet discoveries
- Awards: Lone Star Gazer (1986); William Tyler Olcott Distinguished Service (2011)
- Scientific career
- Fields: Astronomy; Photometry
- Workplaces: Lowell Observatory

Minor planets discovered: 60
see § List of discovered minor planets

Brian A. Skiff is an American astronomer noted for discovering numerous asteroids and a number of comets including the periodic comets 114P/Wiseman–Skiff (with Jennifer Wiseman) and 140P/Bowell–Skiff (with Edward Bowell). He is also known for his photometry work on Sun-like stars and on the rotational light curves of asteroids.

== Biography ==
Skiff received his BS from Northern Arizona University in 1977 and has worked as a research astronomer at Lowell Observatory since 1976. Beyond research, he participates in public outreach and can often be found engaging with guests of the observatory.

Between 1980 and 1997, he has also discovered a total 60 numbered minor planets, including (15398) 1997 UZ_{23}, a dark Jupiter trojan about 37 kilometers in diameter. Working on the LONEOS project he rediscovered the long lost asteroid 69230 Hermes in October 2003 and the Apohele asteroid (434326) 2004 JG6 in May 2004.

In 1984, while working as an observer with Ted Bowell on the LONEOS program, Skiff discovered the asteroid 4150 Starr. On 18 April 1990, Skiff and Bowell received a letter from Ringo Starr of the Beatles, thanking them for "naming that lump of rock Ringo", but, "next time could you make it a planet, or a sun, or a moon, or a galaxy, or, if you are not too busy, maybe a black hole!"

On 11 November 2002, Skiff discovered the asteroid and quasi-satellite of Venus, 524522 Zoozve. Originally designated 2002 VE_{68}, it caught the attention of Radiolab co-host Latif Nasser after he noticed his child's drawing of the solar system had incorrectly labeled the asteroid 'Zoozve'. Nasser aired this personal anecdote on a Radiolab episode released 26 January 2024. Zoozve became national news, and Skiff proposed to the International Astronomical Union's Working Group Small Bodies Nomenclature (WGSBN) that the asteroid be renamed. The IAU approved 'Zoozve' on 5 February 2024.

Skiff was the final person to use the Pluto Discovery Telescope for research before it was retired and subsequently put on display for the public.

He maintains a catalog of stellar spectral classifications, which is one of the most used items in the VizieR catalog-query service. His encyclopedia-like knowledge of Lowell Observatory's history, of astrophysics, and of photometry are renowned among professional and amateurs alike. He remains an active researcher and observer.

== Awards and honors ==
The Florian main-belt asteroid 2554 Skiff was named in his honor. The official naming citation was published by the Minor Planet Center on 8 April 1982 (M.P.C. 6834).

Skiff received the Texas Star Party’s Lone Star Gazer Award in 1986.

Skiff received the William Tyler Olcott Distinguished Service Award from the American Association of Variable Star Observers in 2011.

== List of discovered minor planets ==
Brian Skiff is credited with the discovery and co-discovery of 60 minor planets between 1981 and 1997. The co-discovery of 2557 Putnam, 3256 Daguerre, 3807 Pagels and 4193 Salanave he made in collaboration with Norman G. Thomas ^{A} .

2525 O'Steen	2 November 1981	list
2557 Putnam	26 September 1981	list^{[A]}
2588 Flavia	2 November 1981	list
2864 Soderblom	12 January 1983	list
2881 Meiden	12 January 1983	list
3140 Stellafane	9 January 1983	list
3153 Lincoln	28 September 1984	list
3154 Grant	28 September 1984	list
3155 Lee	28 September 1984	list
3256 Daguerre	26 September 1981	list^{[A]}

3325 TARDIS	3 May 1984	list
3434 Hurless	2 November 1981	list
3505 Byrd	9 January 1983	list
3617 Eicher	2 June 1984	list
3637 O'Meara	23 October 1984	list
3684 Berry	9 January 1983	list
3706 Sinnott	28 September 1984	list
3807 Pagels	26 September 1981	list^{[A]}
3819 Robinson	12 January 1983	list
3841 Dicicco	4 November 1983	list

3872 Akirafujii	12 January 1983	list
4078 Polakis	9 January 1983	list
4147 Lennon	12 January 1983	list
4149 Harrison	9 March 1984	list
4150 Starr	31 August 1984	list
4193 Salanave	26 September 1981	list^{[A]}
4201 Orosz	3 May 1984	list
4336 Jasniewicz	31 August 1984	list
4690 Strasbourg	9 January 1983	list
4692 SIMBAD	4 November 1983	list

4932 Texstapa	9 March 1984	list
5460 Tsénaat'a'í	12 January 1983	list
5945 Roachapproach	28 September 1984	list
6083 Janeirabloom	25 September 1984	list
6115 Martinduncan	25 September 1984	list
6173 Jimwestphal	9 January 1983	list
6229 Tursachan	4 November 1983	list
6370 Malpais	9 March 1984	list
6690 Messick	25 September 1981	list
7393 Luginbuhl	28 September 1984	list

7863 Turnbull	2 November 1981	list
8147 Colemanhawkins	28 September 1984	list
8994 Kashkashian	6 November 1980	list
10039 Keet Seel	2 June 1984	list
10715 Nagler	11 September 1983	list
11823 Christen	2 November 1981	list
11831 Chaple	28 September 1984	list
13001 Woodney	2 November 1981	list
13006 Schwaar	12 January 1983	list
13487 Novosyadlyj	2 November 1981	list

(15398) 1997 UZ_{23}	30 October 1997	list
29127 Karnath	24 March 1985	list
(30769) 1984 ST_{2}	25 September 1984	list
(43754) 1983 AA	9 January 1983	list
(58621) 1997 UR_{23}	27 October 1997	list
(90947) 1997 UD_{24}	30 October 1997	list
(100634) 1997 UE_{24}	30 October 1997	list
(147952) 1984 BY_{3}	26 January 1984	list
(152649) 1997 UX_{22}	25 October 1997	list
(257528) 1997 UY_{22}	25 October 1997	list

== Works ==
Skiff has published 122 refereed papers on astronomy. His most cited paper is:

- Radick, Richard R.; Lockwood, G. W.; Skiff, B. A.; Baliunas, S. L. (1998). "Patterns of Variation among Sun-like Stars". The Astrophysical Journal Supplement Series. 118 (1): 239–258. Bibcode:1998ApJS..118..239R. doi:10.1086/313135. ISSN 0067-0049. S2CID 122270314.

He is also the author of two books:

- Tirion, Wil; Skiff, Brian (1990). Bright Star Atlas 2000.0. Richmond, Virginia: Willmann-Bell, Inc. ISBN 0-943396-27-1.
- Luginbuhl, Christian B.; Skiff, Brian A. (1998). Observing Handbook and Catalogue of Deep-Sky Objects. Cambridge, UK: Cambridge University Press. ISBN 9780521625562.

== See also ==
- List of minor planet discoverers § B. A. Skiff
