= Bad Boy (Ringo Starr album) =

Studio album by Ringo Starr
- Released: 21 April 1978
- Recorded: November 1977
- Studios: Redwing Studios, Tarzana; Elite, Bahamas; Can-Base, Vancouver; Soundstage, Toronto
- Genre: Rock
- Length: 34:27
- Label: Polydor
- Producer: Vini Poncia

Ringo Starr chronology
Ringo the 4th (1977)	Bad Boy (1978)	Stop and Smell the Roses (1981)

Singles from Bad Boy
- 1. "Lipstick Traces (On a Cigarette)" Released: 18 April 1978 (US); 2. "Heart on My Sleeve" Released: 6 July 1978 (US); 3. "Tonight" Released: 21 July 1978 (UK)

Bad Boy is the seventh studio album by the English rock musician Ringo Starr, released in 1978 by Polydor Records. The album was released at a time of diminishing success for Starr, failing to chart in the UK and reaching only No. 129 in the US and No. 98 in Australia, with none of its singles charting in either the UK or US. Prior to its release in the US, it was cross-promoted with the TV special Ringo, which was poorly received, and a planned follow-up special never came to fruition. Bad Boy would ultimately be Starr's final album release for Polydor.

== Background and recording ==
After Starr's previous album, Ringo the 4th (1977), was not well received critically or commercially, Starr and his musical partner, Vini Poncia, decided to move away from that album's dance-oriented sound and in a more streamlined direction. With Poncia taking over production duties, Starr mostly relied on covering other artists' songs. In November 1977, the album was recorded, for tax purposes, at Can-Base Studio in Vancouver, Toronto, and Elite Recording Studio in the Bahamas. According to saxophonist Tom Saviano, other sessions that took place at Redwing Studios in Tarzana, California. This was also confirmed by Tom Seufert, who owned the studio. It was completed within ten days in November 1977, with the exception of some orchestral overdubs done on 8 March 1978 under the direction of James Newton Howard.

== Release and reception ==
Professional ratings
Review scores
Source	Rating
AllMusic	2/5 stars
The Encyclopedia of Popular Music	2/5 stars
The Essential Rock Discography	4/10
Galeria Musical	3/5 stars
MusicHound Rock	1.5/5 stars
Rolling Stone	(not rated)
The Rolling Stone Album Guide	2/5 stars

The album's first single in the US, "Lipstick Traces (On a Cigarette)", was released by Portrait on 18 April 1978, with "Old Time Relovin'" as the B-side, (Note: US Portrait 6-70015) preceding the album's US release date. A planned release of the single in the UK, for issue in June by Polydor, was shelved. (Note: UK Polydor 2001-782)

Bad Boy was released on 21 April 1978 in the UK, (Note: UK Polydor 2310 599) while in the US it was released on 16 June. (Note: US Portrait JR-353778) The album only reached number 129 in the US, despite the airing of a prime time TV special entitled Ringo, on 26 April. The special was recorded in 10 days in Hollywood, starting on 11 February, and finished in 53rd place out of 65 network prime-time programs during the week it aired. Starr performed three songs from Bad Boy in the special: "Heart on My Sleeve", "Hard Times" and "A Man Like Me". It would air in the UK, on 2 January 1983.

A second US single, "Heart on My Sleeve" backed with "Who Needs a Heart", was released on 6 July. (Note: US Portrait 6-70018) Out of the singles released from Bad Boy in the US, neither "Lipstick Traces (On a Cigarette)" nor "Heart on My Sleeve" charted. In the UK, the lone single was "Tonight", backed with "Heart on My Sleeve", on 21 July, which also failed to chart. (Note: UK Polydor 2001 795) On the same day, production began on another special to promote the album, directed by Christian Topps, but the special was never completed. "A Man Like Me" is simply Scouse the Mouse's "A Mouse Like Me", with all appearances of the word "Mouse" in the lyrics changed to "Man".

Polydor, after three consecutive non-charters in the UK, promptly dropped Starr, while his new US label, Portrait (who had picked him up after Atlantic had dropped him), would cancel his contract in 1981 during the making of his next album, Stop and Smell the Roses.

The album's inner sleeve featured photographs by Starr's then-fiancée Nancy Andrews. Bad Boy was reissued on CD in the US by Epic on 26 March 1991. (Note: US Epic EK 35378)

== Track listing ==
Side one
No.	Title	Writer(s)	Length
1.	"Who Needs a Heart"	Richard Starkey; Vini Poncia	3:48
2.	"Bad Boy"	Lil Armstrong; Avon Long	3:14
3.	"Lipstick Traces"	Naomi Neville	3:14
4.	"Heart on My Sleeve"	Bernard Gallagher; Graham Lyle	3:20
5.	"Where Did Our Love Go"	Eddie Holland; Lamont Dozier; Brian Holland	3:15

Side two
No.	Title	Writer(s)	Length
1.	"Hard Times"	Peter Skellern	3:31
2.	"Tonight"	Ian McLagan; John Pidgeon	2:56
3.	"Monkey See – Monkey Do"	Michael Franks	3:36
4.	"Old Time Relovin'"	Starkey; Poncia	4:16
5.	"A Man Like Me"	Ruan O'Lochlainn; adapted by Donald Pleasence	3:08

== Personnel ==
Ringo's Roadside Attraction

- Push-a-Lone – lead guitar
- Git-tar – rhythm guitar
- Hamisch Bissonnette – synthesizers
- Diesel – bass guitar
- Morris Lane – keyboards
- Ringo Starr – lead vocals, drums
- Featuring Vini Poncia's Peaking Duck Orchestra & Chorus

=== Uncredited ===
- Tom Saviano – saxophone
- Brie Howard – background vocals
- Jean Marie Arnold – background vocals

Technical

- Vini Poncia – producer
- Bob Schaper – engineer
- Ron Hitchcock – mastering (at The Mastering Lab, Hollywood, CA)
- Richard Starkey – associate producer, back cover photography
- Tom of the North – horn arrangements
- Doug Riley – string arrangements, conductor (tracks 5, 10)
- James Newton Howard – string arrangements, conductor (tracks 4, 7)
- Annie Streer – production coordinator
- Nancy Lee Andrews – front cover photography
- Kosh – design

== Charts ==
Chart (1978)	Peak position
Australian Albums (Kent Music Report)	98
US Billboard 200	129
