= Ringo Starr filmography =

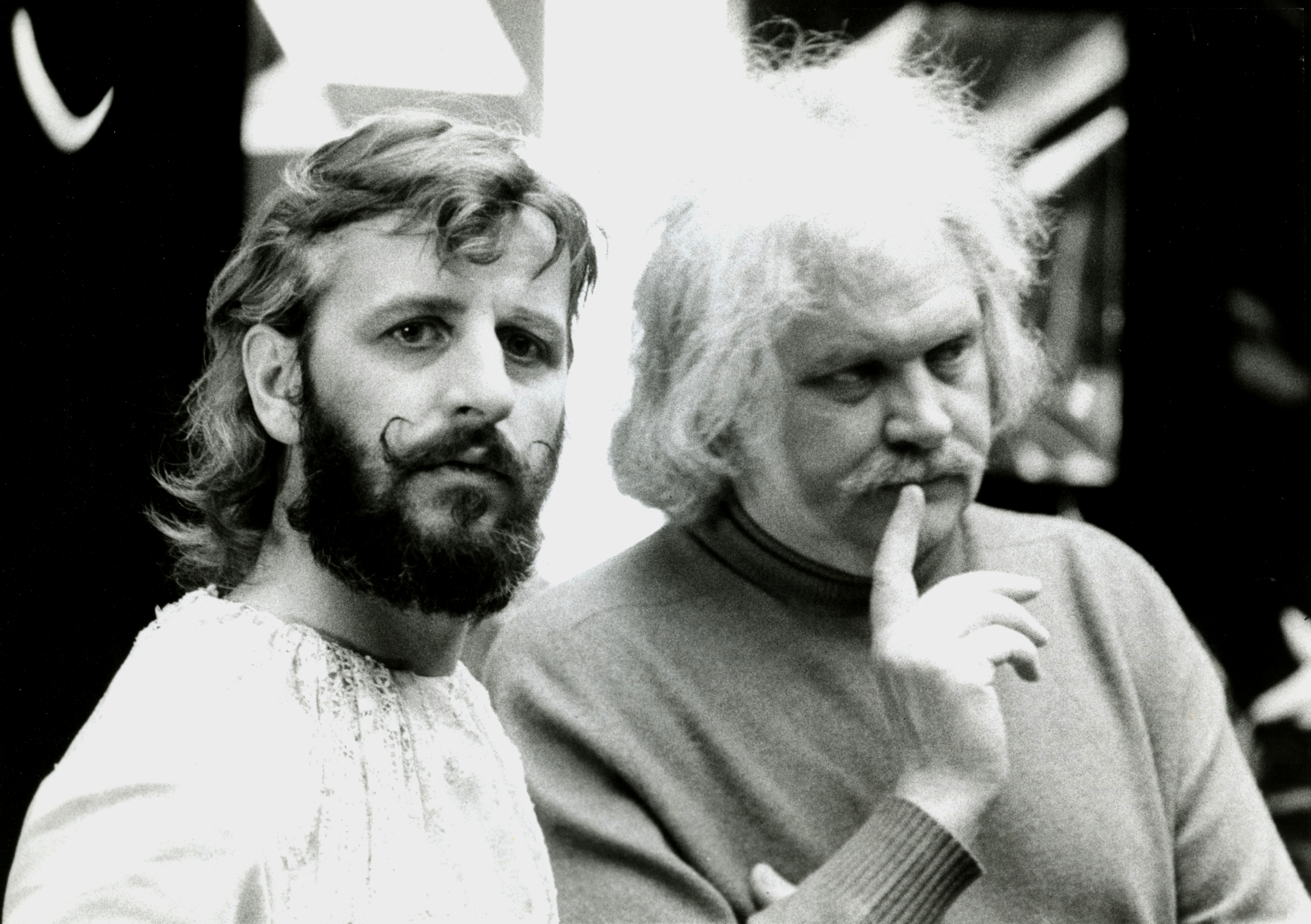
Ringo Starr with Ken Russell in 1975

In addition to the Beatles' films A Hard Day's Night (1964), Help! (1965), Magical Mystery Tour (1967), Yellow Submarine (1968) and Let It Be (1970), Ringo Starr also acted in films such as Candy (1968), The Magic Christian (1969, alongside Peter Sellers), Blindman (1971), Son of Dracula (1974) and Caveman (1981). Starr directed and appeared in Born to Boogie (1972), a concert film featuring Marc Bolan and T. Rex. For the 1979 documentary film on the Who, The Kids Are Alright, Starr appeared in interview segments with fellow drummer Keith Moon. He starred as Larry the Dwarf in Frank Zappa's 200 Motels (1971). His voice is also featured in Harry Nilsson's animated film The Point! (1971).

In 1972, Starr made a brief cameo appearance at the end of an episode of Monty Python's Flying Circus, entitled "Mr. and Mrs. Brian Norris' Ford Popular". He co-starred in That'll Be the Day (1973) as a Teddy Boy, and went on to appear in The Last Waltz, the Martin Scorsese film about the 1976 farewell concert of the Band, a favourite of the Beatles. Starr played 'The Pope' in Ken Russell's Lisztomania (1975), and a fictionalised version of himself in Paul McCartney's Give My Regards to Broad Street in 1984. He also appeared as himself, and downtrodden alter-ego Ognir Rrats, in Ringo (1978), an American-made television comedy film based loosely on The Prince and the Pauper.

Starr was best known to be the first narrator of the children's programme Thomas the Tank Engine & Friends from 1984–86 for the British broadcast and from 1989–90 in the United States.

== Filmography ==
=== Film ===
Title	Year	Role	Notes
A Hard Day's Night	1964	Himself	
Help!	1965	Himself	
Yellow Submarine	1968	Himself	Cameo
Candy	1968	Emmanuel	
The Magic Christian	1969	Youngman Grand	
Let It Be	1970	Himself	Documentary film
200 Motels	1971	Larry the Dwarf	
Blindman	1971	Candy	
The Concert for Bangladesh	1972	Himself	Concert film
Born to Boogie	1972	Himself	Concert film; also director
That'll Be the Day	1973	Mike	
Ziggy Stardust and the Spiders from Mars	1973	Himself	Documentary film
Son of Dracula	1974	Merlin	Also producer
Lisztomania	1975	The Pope	
Sextette	1978	Laslo Karolny	
The Last Waltz	1978	Himself	Concert film
The Kids Are Alright	1979	Himself	Documentary film
Caveman	1981	Atouk	
Give My Regards to Broad Street	1984	Himself	
Water	1985	Singing Rebels' member	Cameo
Walking After Midnight	1988	Himself	Documentary film
Concert for George	2003	Himself	Documentary film
All Together Now	2008	Himself	Documentary film
George Harrison: Living in the Material World	2011	Himself	Documentary film
Popstar: Never Stop Never Stopping	2016	Himself	Cameo
The Beatles: Eight Days a Week	2016	Himself	Documentary film
Beatles '64	2024	Himself	Documentary film

=== Television ===
Title	Year	Role	Notes
Magical Mystery Tour	1967	Himself	Television movie
The Point!	1971	Narrator / Father	Home video releases only
Monty Python's Flying Circus	1972	Himself	Episode: "Mr. and Mrs. Brian Norris' Ford Popular"
Ringo	1978	Himself / Ognir Rrats	Television movie
Princess Daisy	1983	Robin Valerian	Main role
Thomas the Tank Engine & Friends	1984–86	Narrator	Series 1–2
Alice in Wonderland	1985	Mock Turtle	Episode: "Part 1 – Alice in Wonderland"
The Return of Bruno	1988	Himself	Television movie
Shining Time Station	1989–90	Mr. Conductor	Lead role (season 1 + Christmas special)
The Simpsons	1991	Himself	Episode: "Brush with Greatness"
Shelley Duvall's Bedtime Stories	1992	Narrator	Episode: "Elbert's Bad Word / Weird Parents"
The Beatles Anthology	1995	Himself	Docuseries
Sabrina the Teenage Witch	1998	Mummy	Episode: "Good Will Haunting"
The Powerpuff Girls: Dance Pantsed	2014	Fibonacci Sequins	Voice role
The Beatles: Get Back	2021	Himself	Docuseries

== Sources ==
- Harry, Bill (2004). The Ringo Starr Encyclopedia. Virgin Books. ISBN 0-7535-0843-5.
