= Ringo for President =

Song by the Young World Singers
- Released: 1964
- Recorded: 1964
- Length: 2:38
- Label: Decca

"Ringo for President" is a 1964 novelty song released during the 1964 U.S. presidential campaign, inspired by the semi-satirical movement spreading nationally among teenagers. In the song, the Beatles drummer Ringo Starr is hailed as the ideal presidential candidate "because he makes us feel so great" and "doesn't talk about war out on the big dance floor".

The single was released by the Young World Singers and published by Decca Records. It charted on the Billboard Bubbling Under Hot 100 Singles at number 132. The song was also covered by Australian entertainer Rolf Harris.

== Ringo for President movement ==
A semi-satirical "Ringo for President" movement sprung up in mid-July 1964 among U.S. teenage girls not yet of voting age. Following an early "Ringo for President" demonstration on July 7, 1964, on the drummer's 24th birthday, "Ringo rallies" took place at the 1964 Republican National Convention in San Francisco and across the nation. Crowds of teenage girls attended public demonstrations carrying homemade posters with notably catchy slogans such as "go bingo with Ringo" and "Ringo speaks our lingo". At a Ringo rally in El Paso, Texas, "not a single boy was present". Some Americans cast their votes for Starr as a write-in candidate. When asked in an August 18 press conference how he felt about the "Ringo for President" campaign, Ringo Starr responded "well, it’s rather… It’s marvelous!" but did not know what any of his political positions would be because "I’m not sort of politically minded". The other Beatles liked the idea of Ringo as a presidential nominee but Ringo seemed unsure about whether he would nominate them to his hypothetical cabinet, saying "Well, I'd have to... wouldn't I?"
