= 6229 Tursachan =

Main-belt asteroid

Discovery
- Discovered by: B. A. Skiff
- Discovery site: Anderson Mesa Stn.
- Discovery date: 4 November 1983

Designations
- Named after: "Standing Stones" (Gaelic language)
- Alternative designations: 1983 VN_{7} · 1988 RC_{2}
- Minor planet category: main-belt · (outer); Themis

Orbital characteristics
- Epoch 23 March 2018 (JD 2458200.5)
- Uncertainty parameter 0
- Observation arc: 34.40 yr (12,565 d)
- Aphelion: 3.6472 AU
- Perihelion: 2.5155 AU
- Semi-major axis: 3.0814 AU
- Eccentricity: 0.1836
- Orbital period (sidereal): 5.41 yr (1,976 d)
- Mean anomaly: 142.06°
- Mean motion: 0° 10^{m} 55.92^{s} / day
- Inclination: 1.6495°
- Longitude of ascending node: 146.28°
- Argument of perihelion: 234.29°

Physical characteristics
- Mean diameter: 8.61 km (calculated); 10.34±2.69 km 11.18±3.50 km 11.603±0.070 km
- Synodic rotation period: 16.596±0.0167 h
- Geometric albedo: 0.07±0.04; 0.076±0.012; 0.089±0.113; 0.08 (assumed)
- Spectral type: C (assumed)
- Absolute magnitude (H): 13.00; 13.2; 13.236±0.003 (R); 13.39±0.24; 13.44; 13.69

6229 Tursachan, provisional designation 1983 VN_{7}, is a Themistian asteroid from the outer regions of the asteroid belt, approximately 10 kilometers (6 miles) in diameter. It was discovered on 4 November 1983, by American astronomer Brian Skiff at Lowell's Anderson Mesa Station near Flagstaff, Arizona, in the United States. The presumed C-type asteroid has a rotation period of 16.6 hours and is possibly elongated. It was named after a Gaelic word meaning "Standing Stones".

== Orbit and classification ==
Tursachan is a Themistian asteroid that belongs to the Themis family (602), a very large family of carbonaceous asteroids, named after 24 Themis.

It orbits the Sun in the outer main-belt at a distance of 2.5–3.6 AU once every 5 years and 5 months (1,976 days; semi-major axis of 3.08 AU). Its orbit has an eccentricity of 0.18 and an inclination of 2° with respect to the ecliptic. The body's observation arc begins with a precovery taken at Palomar Observatory just 5 nights prior to its official discovery observation at Anderson Mesa.

== Physical characteristics ==
Tursachan is an assumed C-type asteroid, which agrees with the overall spectral type for members of the Themis family.

=== Rotation period ===
In September 2010, a rotational lightcurve of Tursachan was obtained from photometric observations in the R-band by astronomers at the Palomar Transient Factory in California. Lightcurve analysis gave a rotation period of 16.596 hours with a brightness amplitude of 0.57 magnitude, indicative of an elongated shape (U=2).

=== Diameter and albedo ===
According to the survey carried out by the NEOWISE mission of NASA's Wide-field Infrared Survey Explorer, Tursachan measures between 10.34 and 11.603 kilometers in diameter and its surface has an albedo between 0.07 and 0.089.

The Collaborative Asteroid Lightcurve Link assumes an albedo of 0.08 and calculates a diameter of 8.61 kilometers based on an absolute magnitude of 13.69.

== Naming ==
This minor planet was named after the term "Tursachan", which means "Standing Stones" in the Gaelic language (Tursachan is the plural form of Tursa, meaning in Gaelic "megalith, monolith, menhir"), and refers to the stones often placed in circles during the Neolithic (approximately 10,000 BC to 2000 BC) on the British Isles. These stones may have been used to follow the seasons and mark astronomical events. The official naming citation was published by the Minor Planet Center on 11 February 1998 (M.P.C. 31296).
