= 13006 Schwaar =

Phocaea asteroid

Discovery
- Discovered by: B. A. Skiff
- Discovery site: Anderson Mesa Stn.
- Discovery date: 12 January 1983

Designations
- Named after: Pierre–Yves Schwaar (American amateur astronomer)
- Alternative designations: 1983 AC_{1} · 1990 DH
- Minor planet category: main-belt · Phocaea

Orbital characteristics
- Epoch 4 September 2017 (JD 2458000.5)
- Uncertainty parameter 0
- Observation arc: 34.21 yr (12,495 days)
- Aphelion: 2.7336 AU
- Perihelion: 1.8143 AU
- Semi-major axis: 2.2739 AU
- Eccentricity: 0.2021
- Orbital period (sidereal): 3.43 yr (1,252 days)
- Mean anomaly: 29.457°
- Mean motion: 0° 17^{m} 14.64^{s} / day
- Inclination: 28.523°
- Longitude of ascending node: 129.27°
- Argument of perihelion: 358.22°

Physical characteristics
- Dimensions: 5.04 km (calculated); 5.325±0.052; 5.892±0.113 km
- Synodic rotation period: 6.8 h
- Geometric albedo: 0.182±0.038; 0.1850±0.0281; 0.23 (assumed)
- Spectral type: S
- Absolute magnitude (H): 13.6 · 13.7 · 13.97±0.22

13006 Schwaar, provisional designation 1983 AC_{1}, is a stony Phocaea asteroid from the inner regions of the asteroid belt, approximately 5 kilometers in diameter. It was discovered on 12 January 1983, by American astronomer Brian Skiff at Lowell's Anderson Mesa Station in Flagstaff, Arizona. The asteroid was named after amateur astronomer Pierre–Yves Schwaar.

== Orbit and classification ==
Schwaar is a member of the Phocaea family (701), a rather small group of asteroids with similar orbital characteristics, named after its largest member, 25 Phocaea. It orbits the Sun in the inner main-belt at a distance of 1.8–2.7 AU once every 3 years and 5 months (1,252 days). Its orbit has an eccentricity of 0.20 and an inclination of 29° with respect to the ecliptic. No precoveries were taken. The asteroid's observation arc begins 20 days after its discovery.

== Physical characteristics ==
Schwaar has been characterized as a S-type asteroid by Pan-STARRS photometric survey.

=== Lightcurves ===
A rotational lightcurve of Schwaar was obtained from photometric observations made at the Hunters Hill Observatory (E14), Australia, and collaborating stations in December 2006. The lightcurve gave a rotation period of 6.8 hours with a brightness variation of 0.17 in magnitude (U=3-).

=== Diameter and albedo ===
According to the survey carried out by the NEOWISE mission of NASA's space-based Wide-field Infrared Survey Explorer, Schwaar measures 5.3 and 5.9 kilometers in diameter and its surface has an albedo of 0.182 and 0.185, respectively, while the Collaborative Asteroid Lightcurve Link assumes a standard albedo for members of the Phocaea family of 0.23, and calculates a diameter of 5.0 kilometers with an absolute magnitude of 13.7.

== Naming ==
This minor planet was named in memory amateur astronomer Pierre–Yves Schwaar (1946–2000), member of the Saguaro Astronomy Club (SAC), telescope maker, and photographer of the night sky. The official naming citation was published by the Minor Planet Center on 9 January 2001 (M.P.C. 41939). The native Swiss amateur astronomer and immigrant to the U.S. was also an inventor and master craftsman, a model rocketeer, an USAF aircraft mechanic, a Vietnam veteran, and an eclipse chaser.
