= Ringo Starr =

English musician and actor (born 1940)

Sir Ringo Starr MBE
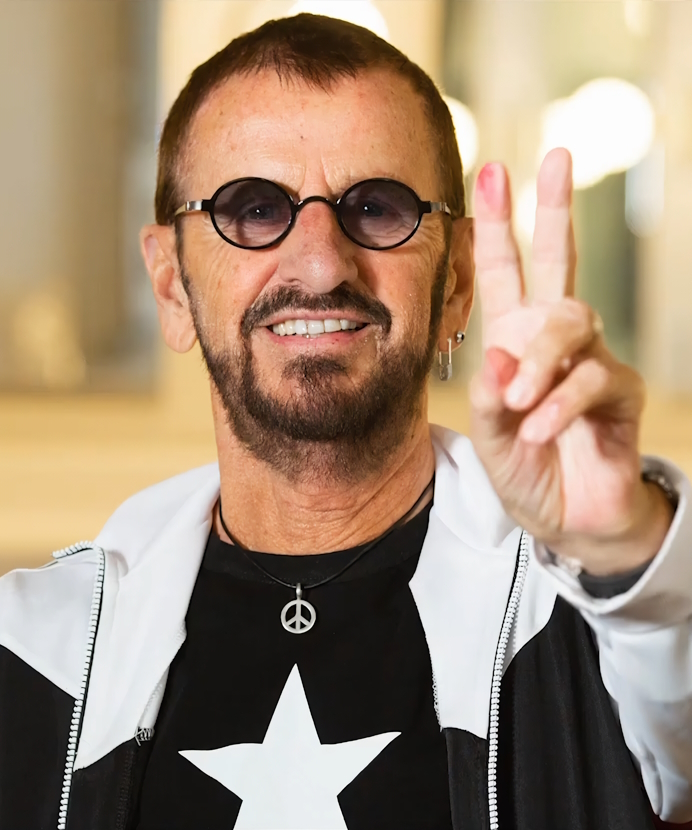
- Starr in 2019
- Born: Richard Starkey; 7 July 1940 (age 86); Liverpool, England
- Occupations: Musician; singer; songwriter; actor
- Years active: 1957–present
- Works: Discography; songs; filmography
- Spouses: Maureen Cox (m. 1965; div. 1975); Barbara Bach (m. 1981)
- Children: 3, including Zak
- Relatives: Francesca Gregorini (stepdaughter)
- Musical career
- Genres: Rock; pop; country
- Instruments: Drums; vocals
- Labels: Apple; Polydor; Atlantic; Portrait; Boardwalk; RCA; Bellaphon; Rhino; Rykodisc; Private Music; Mercury; Eagle; Koch; BMG; CNR; Capitol; Hip-O; UM^{e}; Roccabella
- Member of: Ringo Starr & His All-Starr Band
- Formerly of: Rory Storm & the Hurricanes; The Beatles; Plastic Ono Band
- Ringo Starr's voice from the BBC Radio 4 programme Front Row, 31 December 2008
- Website: ringostarr.com

Sir Richard Starkey (born 7 July 1940), known as Ringo Starr, is an English musician, singer, songwriter and actor who achieved international fame as the drummer for the Beatles. He sometimes sang lead vocals on the group's recordings, usually for one song on each album; these include "Yellow Submarine" and "With a Little Help from My Friends". He also wrote and sang the Beatles songs "Don't Pass Me By" and "Octopus's Garden", and is credited as a co-writer of three others.

Starr was afflicted by life-threatening illnesses during childhood, with periods of prolonged hospitalisation. As a teenager he became interested in the skiffle craze and developed a fervent admiration for the genre. In 1957, he co-founded his first band, the Eddie Clayton Skiffle Group, which earned several local bookings before the fad succumbed to American rock and roll around early 1958. When the Beatles formed in 1960, Starr was a member of another Liverpool group, Rory Storm and the Hurricanes. After achieving moderate success in the UK and Hamburg, he quit the Hurricanes when he was asked to join the Beatles in August 1962, replacing Pete Best.

After the Beatles disbanded, Starr released several successful singles, including the US top-ten hit "It Don't Come Easy", and number ones "Photograph" and "You're Sixteen". His most successful UK single was "Back Off Boogaloo", which peaked at number two. He achieved commercial and critical success with his 1973 album Ringo, which was a top-ten release in both the UK and the US. In addition to the Beatles' films, Starr has acted in numerous others. He has also featured in numerous documentaries, hosted television shows, narrated the first two series of the children's television series Thomas & Friends and portrayed "Mr. Conductor" during the first season of its American spin-off Shining Time Station. Since 1989, he has toured with sixteen variations of Ringo Starr & His All-Starr Band.

Starr's playing style, which emphasised feel over technical virtuosity, influenced many drummers to reconsider their playing from a compositional perspective. He also influenced various modern drumming techniques, such as the matched grip, tuning the drums lower, and using muffling devices on tonal rings. In his opinion, his finest recorded performance was on the Beatles' "Rain". In 1999, he was inducted into the Modern Drummer Hall of Fame. In 2011, Rolling Stone readers named him the fifth-greatest drummer of all time. He was inducted twice into the Rock and Roll Hall of Fame, as a Beatle in 1988 and as a solo artist in 2015, and appointed a Knight Bachelor in the 2018 New Year Honours for services to music.

== Early life ==
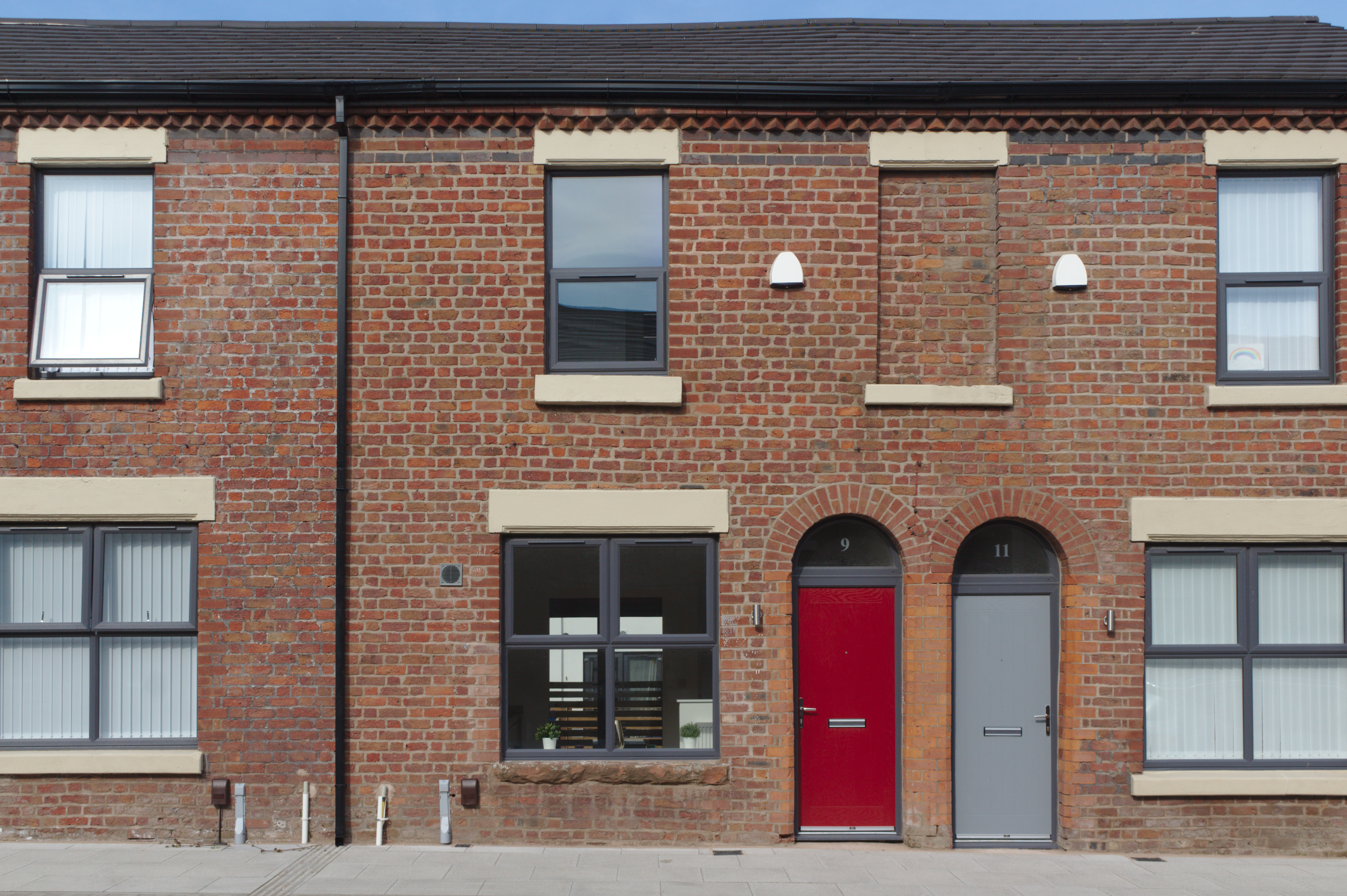
Starr's birthplace in Madryn Street, Dingle, Liverpool, in May 2013

Richard Starkey was born on 7 July 1940 at 9 Madryn Street in Dingle, an inner-city area of Liverpool. He is the only child of confectioners Richard Starkey and Elsie Gleave. Elsie enjoyed singing and dancing, a hobby that she shared with her husband, an avid fan of swing. Prior to the birth of their son, whom they called "Ritchie", the couple had spent much of their free time on the local ballroom circuit, but their regular outings ended soon after his birth. Elsie adopted an overprotective approach to raising her son that bordered on fixation. Subsequently, "Big Ritchie", as Starkey's father became known, lost interest in his family, choosing instead to spend long hours drinking and dancing in pubs, sometimes for several consecutive days.

In an effort to reduce their housing costs, his family moved in 1944 to another neighbourhood in the Dingle, Admiral Grove; soon afterwards his parents separated, and they divorced within the year. Starkey later stated that he has "no real memories" of his father, who made little effort to bond with him, visiting as few as three times thereafter. Elsie found it difficult to survive on her ex-husband's support payments of thirty shillings a week, so she took on several menial jobs cleaning houses before securing a position as a barmaid, an occupation that she held for twelve years.

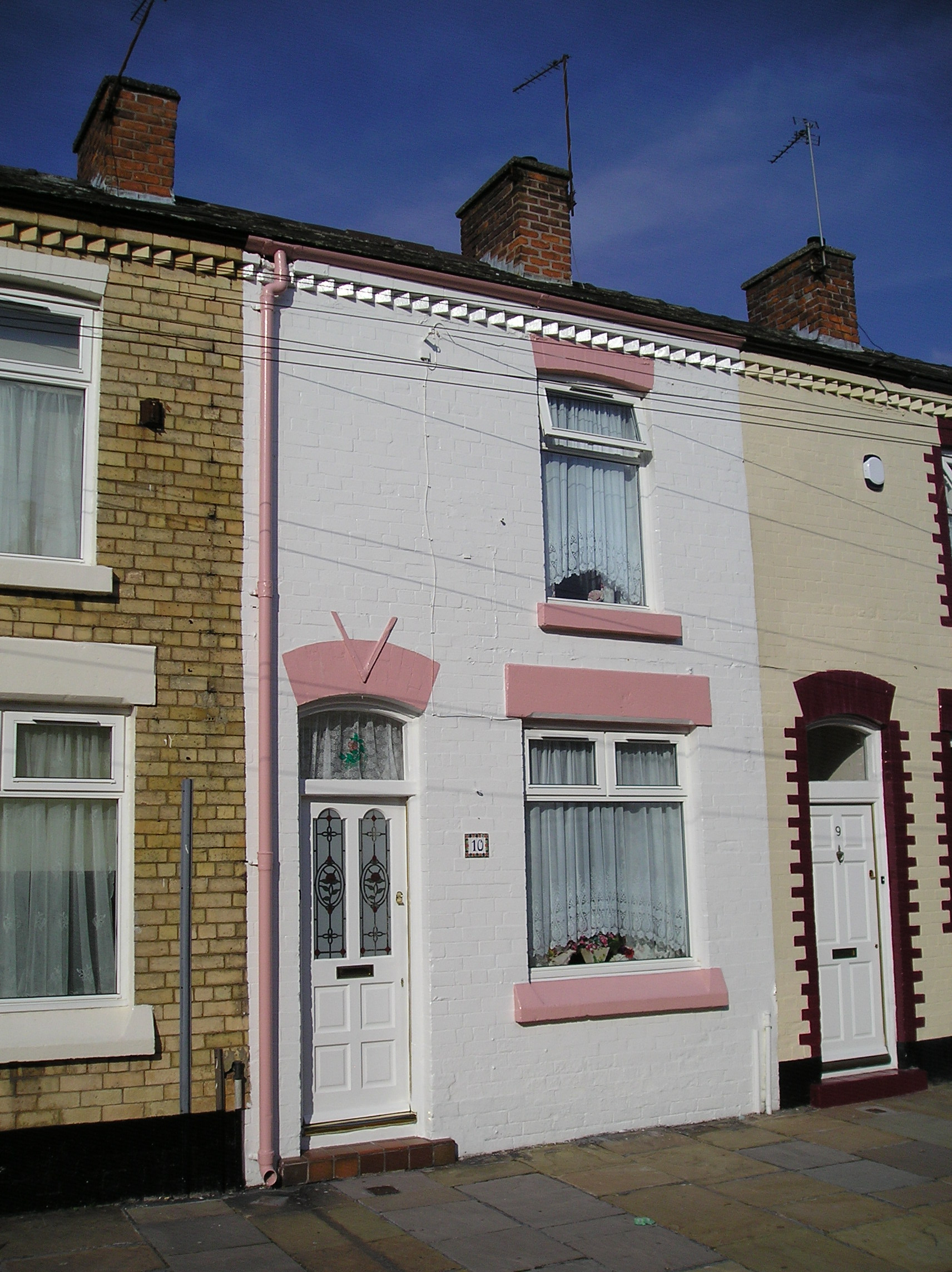
Starr's childhood residence at 10 Admiral Grove, Dingle, Liverpool, in 2010

Starkey developed appendicitis at the age of six. Following an appendectomy he contracted peritonitis, causing him to fall into a coma that lasted days. His recovery spanned twelve months, which he spent away from his family at Liverpool's Myrtle Street children's hospital. Upon his discharge in May 1948, his mother allowed him to stay at home, causing him to miss school. At the age of eight he remained illiterate, with a poor grasp of mathematics. His lack of education contributed to a feeling of alienation at school, which resulted in his regularly playing truant at Sefton Park. After several years of twice-weekly tutoring from his surrogate sister and neighbour, Marie Maguire Crawford, Starkey had nearly caught up to his peers academically, but in 1953, he contracted tuberculosis and was admitted to a sanatorium, where he remained for two years. During his stay, the medical staff made an effort to stimulate motor activity and relieve boredom by encouraging their patients to join the hospital band, and this led to his first exposure to a percussion instrument: a makeshift mallet made from a cotton bobbin that he used to strike the cabinets next to his bed. Soon afterwards he grew increasingly interested in drumming, receiving a copy of the Alyn Ainsworth song "Bedtime for Drums" as a convalescence gift from Crawford. Starkey later commented: "I was in the hospital band [...] That's where I really started playing. I never wanted anything else from there on [...] My grandparents gave me a mandolin and a banjo, but I didn't want them. My grandfather gave me a harmonica [...] we had a piano – nothing. Only the drums."

Starkey attended St Silas, a Church of England primary school near his house where his classmates nicknamed him "Lazarus", and later Dingle Vale Secondary modern school, where he showed an aptitude for art and drama, as well as practical subjects including mechanics. As a result of the prolonged hospitalisations, he fell behind his peers scholastically and was ineligible for the 11-plus qualifying examination required for attendance at a grammar school. After the extended hospital stay following Starkey's recovery from tuberculosis, he did not return to school, preferring instead to stay at home and listen to music while playing along by beating biscuit tins with sticks. On 17 April 1954, Starkey's mother married Harry Graves at the register office on Mount Pleasant, Liverpool. He was an ex-Londoner who had moved to Liverpool following the failure of his first marriage. Graves, an impassioned fan of big band music and their vocalists, introduced Starkey to recordings by Dinah Shore, Sarah Vaughan and Billy Daniels. Graves stated that he and "Ritchie" never had an unpleasant exchange between them; Starkey later commented: "He was great [...] I learned gentleness from Harry."

Starr's early life music inspirations included Lightnin' Hopkins, Ernest Tubb and Hank Williams. He would be inspired to play drums after seeing Gene Krupa do so in The Glenn Miller Story.

Beatles biographer Bob Spitz described Starkey's upbringing as "a Dickensian chronicle of misfortune". Houses in the area were "poorly ventilated, postage-stamp-sized [...] patched together by crumbling plaster walls, with a rear door that opened onto an outhouse." Crawford commented: "Like all of the families who lived in the Dingle, he was part of an ongoing struggle to survive." The children who lived there spent much of their time at Prince's Park, escaping the soot-filled air of their coal-fuelled neighbourhood. Adding to their difficult circumstances, violent crime was an almost constant concern for people living in one of the oldest and poorest inner-city districts in Liverpool. Starkey later commented: "You kept your head down, your eyes open, and you didn't get in anybody's way."

After his return home from the sanatorium in late 1955, Starkey entered the workforce but was lacking in motivation and discipline; his initial attempts at gainful employment proved unsuccessful. In an effort to secure himself some warm clothes, he briefly held a railway worker's job with British Railways, which came with an employer-issued suit. He was supplied with a hat but no uniform and, unable to pass the physical examination, he was laid off and granted unemployment benefits. He then found work as a waiter serving drinks on a day boat that travelled from Liverpool to North Wales, but his fear of conscription into military service led him to quit the job, not wanting to give the Royal Navy the impression that he was suitable for seafaring work. In mid-1956, Graves secured Starkey a position as an apprentice machinist at Henry Hunt and Son, a Liverpool school equipment manufacturer. While working at the facility Starkey befriended Roy Trafford, and the two bonded over their shared interest in music. Trafford introduced Starkey to skiffle, and he quickly became a fervent admirer.

== Career ==
=== First bands ===
Soon after Trafford piqued Starkey's interest in skiffle, the two began rehearsing songs in the manufacturing plant's cellar during their lunch breaks. Trafford recalled: "I played a guitar, and [Ritchie] just made a noise on a box [...] Sometimes, he just slapped a biscuit tin with some keys, or banged on the backs of chairs." The pair were joined by Starkey's neighbour and co-worker, the guitarist Eddie Miles, forming the Eddie Miles Band, later renamed Eddie Clayton and the Clayton Squares after a Liverpool landmark. The band performed popular skiffle songs such as "Rock Island Line" and "Walking Cane", with Starkey raking a thimble across a washboard, creating primitive, driving rhythms. Starkey enjoyed dancing as his parents had years earlier, and he and Trafford briefly took dance lessons at two schools. Though the lessons were short-lived, they provided Starkey and Trafford with an introduction that allowed them to dance competently while enjoying nights out on the town.

On Christmas Day 1957, Graves gave Starkey a second-hand drum kit consisting of a snare drum, bass drum and a makeshift cymbal fashioned from a rubbish bin lid. Although basic and crude, the kit facilitated his progression as a musician while increasing the commercial potential of the Eddie Clayton band, who went on to book prestigious local gigs before the skiffle craze faded in early 1958 as American rock and roll became popular in the UK.

In November 1959, Starkey joined Al Caldwell's Texans, a skiffle group who were looking for someone with a proper drum kit so that the group could transition from one of Liverpool's best-known skiffle acts to a full-fledged rock and roll band. (Note: Starr had first drummed with the Texans on 25 March 1959, at the Mardi Gras club in Liverpool.) They had begun playing local clubs as the Raging Texans, then Jet Storm and the Raging Texans before settling on Rory Storm and the Hurricanes shortly before recruiting Starkey. About this time he adopted the stage name Ringo Starr; derived from the rings he wore and also because it implied a country-and-western influence. His singing solos were billed as Starr Time.

By early 1960, the Hurricanes had become one of Liverpool's leading bands. In May, they were offered a three-month residency at a Butlins holiday camp in Wales. Although initially reluctant to accept the residency and end his five-year machinist apprenticeship that he had begun four years earlier, Starr eventually agreed to the arrangement. The Butlins gig led to other opportunities for the band, including an unpleasant tour of US Air Force bases in France about which Starr commented: "The French don't like the British; at least I didn't like them." The Hurricanes became so successful that when initially offered a highly coveted residency in Hamburg, they turned it down because of their prior commitment with Butlins. They eventually accepted, joining the Beatles at Bruno Koschmider's Kaiserkeller on 1 October 1960, where Starr first met the band. Storm's Hurricanes were given top-billing over the Beatles, who also received less pay. Starr performed with the Beatles during a few stand-in engagements while in Hamburg. On 15 October 1960, he drummed with John Lennon, Paul McCartney and George Harrison, recording with them for the first time while backing Hurricanes singer Lu Walters on the song "Summertime". (Note: Of the nine 78-rpm discs that were cut, only one is known to have survived.) During Starr's first stay in Hamburg he also met Tony Sheridan, who valued his drumming abilities to the point of asking Starr to leave the Hurricanes and join his band.

=== The Beatles ===
==== 1962: Replacing Best ====
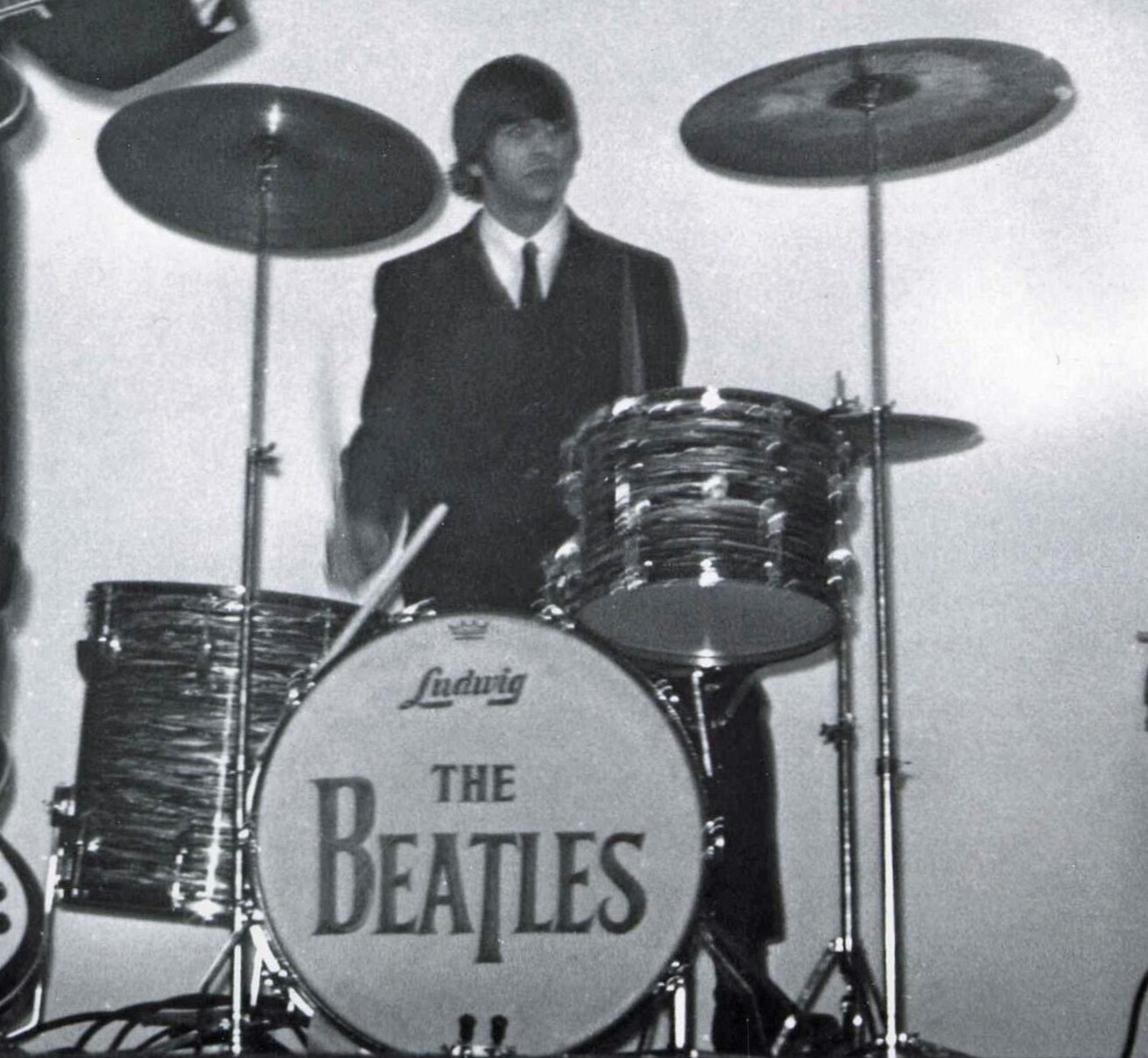
Starr performing with the Beatles in 1964

Starr quit Rory Storm and the Hurricanes in January 1962 and briefly joined Sheridan in Hamburg before returning to the Hurricanes for a third season at Butlins. (Note: Starr sat in for an ill Pete Best during two shows on 5 February 1962.) On 14 August, Starr accepted Lennon's invitation to join the Beatles. On 16 August, Beatles manager Brian Epstein fired their drummer, Pete Best, who recalled: "He said 'I've got some bad news for you. The boys want you out and Ringo in.' He said [Beatles producer] George Martin wasn't too pleased with my playing [and] the boys thought I didn't fit in." Starr first performed as a member of the Beatles on 18 August 1962, at a horticultural society dance at Port Sunlight. After his appearance at the Cavern Club the following day, Best fans, upset by his firing, held vigils outside his house and at the club shouting "Pete forever! Ringo never!" Harrison received a black eye from one upset fan, and Epstein, whose car tyres they had flattened in anger, temporarily hired a bodyguard.

Starr's first recording session as a member of the Beatles took place on 4 September 1962. He stated that Martin had thought that he "was crazy and couldn't play [...] because I was trying to play the percussion and the drums at the same time, we were just a four-piece band". For their second recording session with Starr, on 11 September 1962, Martin replaced him with session drummer Andy White while recording takes for what would be the two sides of the Beatles' first single, "Love Me Do", backed with "P.S. I Love You". Starr played tambourine on "Love Me Do" and maracas on "P.S. I Love You". Concerned about his status in the Beatles, he thought: "That's the end, they're doing a Pete Best on me." Martin later clarified: "I simply didn't know what Ringo was like and I wasn't prepared to take any risks." (Note: Martin chose 4 September version of "Love Me Do" with Starr on drums for the A-side and 11 September recording of "P.S. I Love You" with Starr on maracas for the B-side.)

By November 1962, Starr had been accepted by Beatles fans, who were now calling for him to sing. He began receiving an amount of fan mail equal to that of the others, which helped to secure his position within the band. Starr considered himself fortunate to be on the same "wavelength" as the other Beatles: "I had to be, or I wouldn't have lasted. I had to join them as people as well as a drummer." He was given a small percentage of Lennon and McCartney's publishing company, Northern Songs, but derived his primary income during this period from a one-quarter share of Beatles Ltd, a corporation financed by the band's net concert earnings. He commented on the nature of his lifestyle after having achieved success with the Beatles: "I lived in nightclubs for three years. It used to be a non-stop party." Like his father, Starr became well known for his late-night dancing and he received praise for his skills.

==== 1963–1966: Worldwide success ====
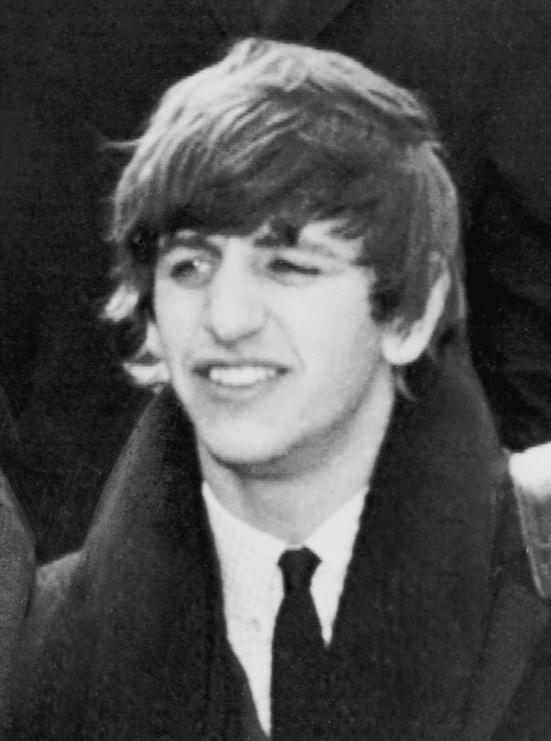
Starr at New York City's John F. Kennedy International Airport on 7 February 1964

During 1963, the Beatles enjoyed increasing popularity in Britain. In January, their second single, "Please Please Me", followed "Love Me Do" into the UK charts and a successful television appearance on Thank Your Lucky Stars earned favourable reviews, leading to a boost in sales and radio play. By the end of the year, the phenomenon known as Beatlemania had spread throughout the country, and by February 1964 the Beatles had become an international success when they performed in New York City on The Ed Sullivan Show to a record 73 million viewers. Starr commented: "In the States I know I went over well. It knocked me out to see and hear the kids waving for me. I'd made it as a personality [...] Our appeal [...] is that we're ordinary lads." He was a source of inspiration for several songs written at the time, including Penny Valentine's "I Want to Kiss Ringo Goodbye" and Rolf Harris's "Ringo for President". Cher released her first single, "Ringo, I Love You" in 1964 under the pseudonym Bonnie Joe Mason.

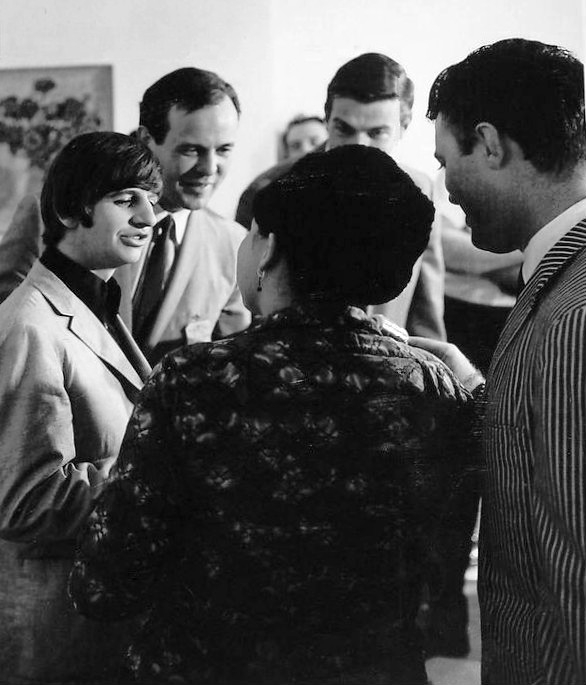
Starr (far left) in 1965

In 1964, "I love Ringo" lapel pins were the best-selling Beatles merchandise. The prominent placing of the Ludwig logo on the bass drum of his American import drum kit gave the company such a burst of publicity that it became the dominant drum manufacturer in North America for the next twenty years. During live performances, the Beatles continued the "Starr Time" routine that had been popular among his fans: Lennon would place a microphone in front of Starr's kit in preparation for his spotlight moment and audiences would erupt in screams. When the Beatles made their film debut in A Hard Day's Night, Starr garnered praise from critics, who considered his delivery of deadpan one-liners and his non-speaking scenes highlights. The extended non-speaking sequences had to be arranged by director Richard Lester because of Starr's lack of sleep the previous night; Starr commented: "Because I'd been drinking all night I was incapable of saying a line." Epstein attributed Starr's acclaim to "the little man's quaintness". After the release of the Beatles' second feature film, Help! (1965), Starr won a Melody Maker poll against his fellow Beatles for his performance as the central character in the film.

During an interview with Playboy in 1964, Lennon explained that Starr had filled in with the Beatles when Best was ill; Starr replied: "[Best] took little pills to make him ill". Soon after, Best filed a libel suit against him that lasted four years before the court reached an undisclosed settlement in Best's favour. In June, the Beatles were scheduled to begin their world tour of Denmark, the Netherlands, Asia, Australia and New Zealand. Before the start of the tour, Starr was stricken with a high-grade fever, pharyngitis and tonsillitis, and briefly stayed in a local hospital, followed by several days of recuperation at home. He was temporarily replaced for five concerts by 24-year-old session drummer Jimmie Nicol. Starr was discharged from the hospital and rejoined the band in Melbourne on 15 June. (Note: Epstein then accompanied Nicol to the Melbourne airport where he gave him a cheque and a gold Eterna-Matic wrist watch inscribed: "From the Beatles and Brian Epstein to Jimmy – with appreciation and gratitude." Starr had his tonsils removed later that year during a Christmas holiday.) He later said that he feared he would be permanently replaced during his illness. In August, the Beatles were introduced to American songwriter Bob Dylan, who offered the group cannabis cigarettes. Starr was the first to try one but the others were hesitant.

On 11 February 1965, Starr married Maureen Cox, whom he had met in 1962. By this time the stress and pressure of Beatlemania had reached a peak for him. He received a telephoned death threat before a show in Montreal, and resorted to positioning his cymbals vertically in an attempt to defend against would-be assassins. The constant pressure affected the Beatles' performances; Starr commented: "We were turning into such bad musicians [...] there was no groove to it." He was also feeling increasingly isolated from the musical activities of his bandmates, who were moving past the traditional boundaries of rock music into territory that often did not require his accompaniment; during recording sessions he spent hours playing cards with their road manager Neil Aspinall and road manager Mal Evans while the other Beatles perfected tracks without him. In a letter published in Melody Maker, a fan asked the Beatles to let Starr sing more; he replied: "[I am] quite happy with my one little track on each album".

In an interview with Dan Rather which aired on AXS TV in May 2024, Starr downplayed the significance of his role with the Beatles, especially with regards to practising with them. When asked by Dan Rather about "all those hours you spent practising," Starr stated that actually "I didn't. I hate practising. I hate sitting there," found practising to be "boring" and in fact "did all my learning with other musicians, other bands," further noting that he "learned everything with everyone else at that time." Starr further hinted to Rather that tensions between him and his bandmates were tense even early into their formation, stating "we didn't get along, we were four guys, we had rows," with their relationship becoming more tense even by the time he had children. However, these "rows" between the Beatles bandmates had yet to get in way of the unity they still had through music ambitions.

==== 1966–1970: Studio years ====
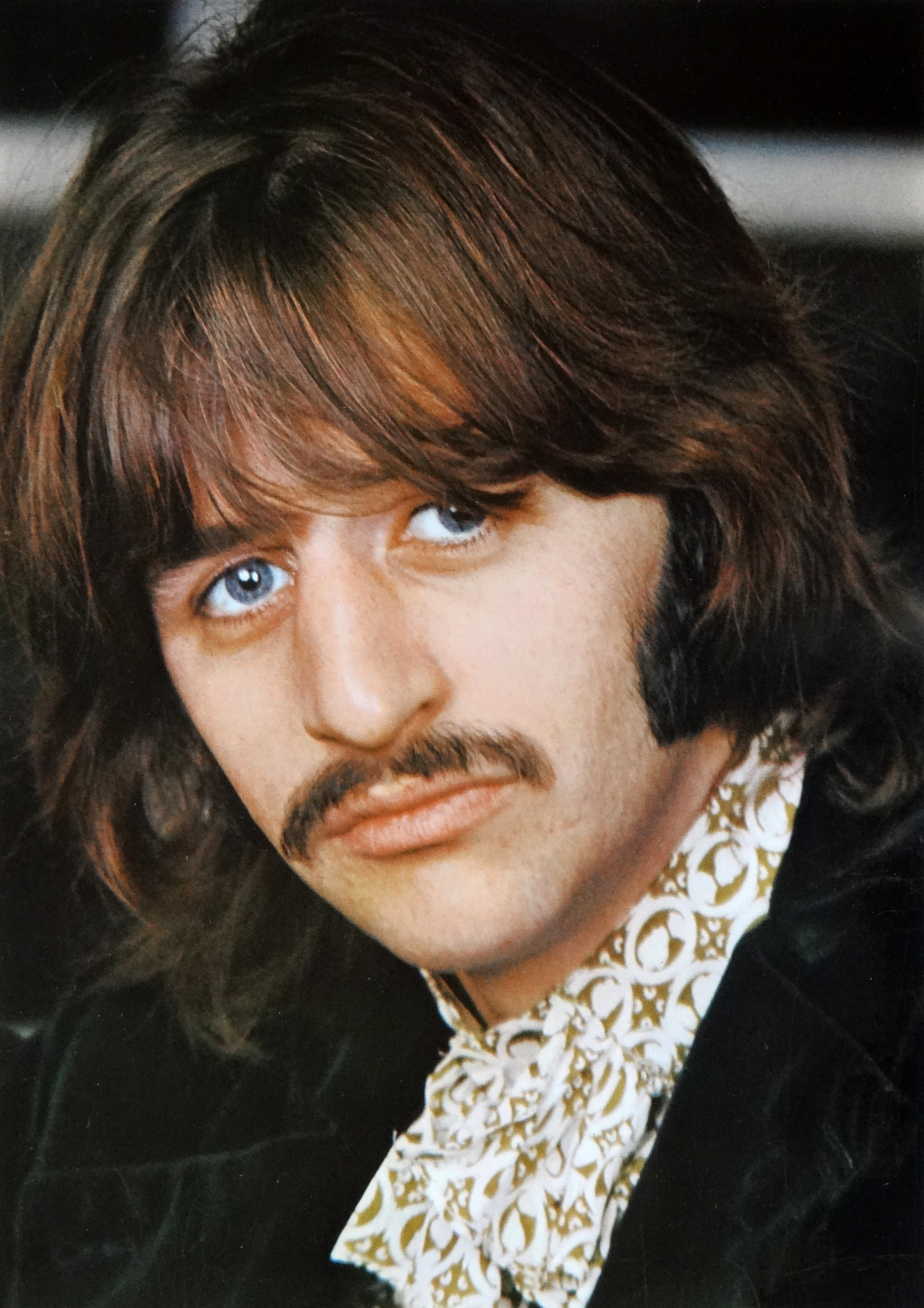
Starr in 1968

In August 1966, the Beatles released Revolver, their seventh UK LP. It included the song "Yellow Submarine", their only British number-one single with Starr as the lead singer. Later that month, owing to the increasing pressures of touring, the Beatles gave their final concert, a 30-minute performance at San Francisco's Candlestick Park. Starr commented: "We gave up touring at the right time. Four years of Beatlemania were enough for anyone." By December he had moved to a larger estate called Sunny Heights, 3 acres (1.2 ha) in size, at St George's Hill in Weybridge, Surrey, near to Lennon. Although he had equipped the house with many luxury items, including numerous televisions, light machines, film projectors, stereo equipment, a billiard table, go-kart track and a bar named the Flying Cow, he did not include a drum kit; he explained: "When we don't record, I don't play."

For the Beatles' seminal 1967 album, Sgt. Pepper's Lonely Hearts Club Band, Starr sang lead vocals on the Lennon–McCartney composition "With a Little Help from My Friends". Although the Beatles had enjoyed widespread commercial and critical success with Sgt. Pepper, the long hours they spent recording the LP contributed to Starr's increased feeling of alienation within the band; he commented: "[It] wasn't our best album. That was the peak for everyone else, but for me it was a bit like being a session musician [...] They more or less direct me in the style I can play." (Note: Starr offered no suggestions for inclusion on the album's historic front cover.) His inability to compose new material led to his input being minimised during recording sessions; he often found himself relegated to adding minor percussion effects to songs by McCartney, Lennon and Harrison. During his downtime, Starr worked on his guitar playing, and said: "I jump into chords that no one seems to get into. Most of the stuff I write is twelve-bar".

Epstein's death in August 1967 left the Beatles without management; Starr remarked: "[It was] a strange time for us, when it's someone who we've relied on in the business, where we never got involved." Soon afterwards, the band began an ill-fated film project, Magical Mystery Tour. Starr's growing interest in photography led to his billing as the movie's Director of Photography, and his participation in the film's editing was matched only by that of McCartney. In February 1968, Starr became the first Beatle to sing on another artist's show without the others. He sang the Buck Owens hit "Act Naturally", and performed a duet with Cilla Black, "Do You Like Me Just a Little Bit?" on her BBC One television programme, Cilla.

In November 1968, Apple Records released The Beatles, commonly known as the "White Album". The album was partly inspired by the band's recent interactions with the Maharishi Mahesh Yogi. While attending the Maharishi's intermediate course at his ashram in Rishikesh, India, they enjoyed one of their most prolific writing periods, composing most of the album there. It was here that Starr completed his first recorded Beatles song, "Don't Pass Me By", but he left after 10 days and later compared his time there to a stay at Butlin's. The long-lasting health problems that began in his childhood had an impact on his time in India, causing him to experience allergies and sensitivities to the local food; when the band travelled there, he resorted to taking his own food with him.

Relations within the Beatles deteriorated during the recording of the White Album, and there were occasions where only one or two members were involved in the recording of a track. Starr had become tired of McCartney's increasingly overbearing approach, Lennon's passive-aggressive behaviour, and the near-constant presence of Lennon's wife Yoko Ono. After one particularly difficult session which included McCartney harshly criticising his drumming, Starr briefly quit the Beatles and went on holiday to Sardinia, where he and his family stayed on a boat loaned to them by actor Peter Sellers. During a lunch there, the chef served octopus and Starr refused to eat it; an ensuing conversation with the ship's captain about the animal inspired Starr's song "Octopus's Garden" from the Beatles' album Abbey Road, which he wrote using a guitar during the trip. Two weeks later, he returned to the studio to find that Harrison had covered his drum kit in flowers as a welcome-back gesture.

Despite a temporary return to friendly interactions during the completion of the White Album, production of the Beatles' fourth feature film Let It Be and its accompanying album further strained band relationships. On 20 August 1969, the Beatles gathered for the final time at Abbey Road Studios for a mixing session for "I Want You". At a business meeting exactly one month later, Lennon told the others that he was leaving the band, effective immediately. However, the band's break-up would not become public knowledge until McCartney's announcement on 10 April 1970 that he was also leaving.

=== Solo career ===
==== 1970–1973: Early solo work ====
Shortly before McCartney announced his exit from the Beatles in April 1970, he and Starr had a falling out due to McCartney's refusal to cede the release date of his eponymous solo album to allow for Starr's debut, Sentimental Journey, and the Beatles' Let It Be. Starr's album – composed of renditions of pre-rock standards that included musical arrangements by Quincy Jones, Maurice Gibb, George Martin and McCartney – peaked at number seven in the UK and number 22 in the US. Starr followed Sentimental Journey with the country-inspired Beaucoups of Blues, engineered by Scotty Moore and featuring renowned Nashville session musician Pete Drake. Despite favourable reviews, the album was a commercial failure. Starr subsequently combined his musical activities with developing a career as a film actor.

Starr played drums on Lennon's John Lennon/Plastic Ono Band (1970), Ono's Yoko Ono/Plastic Ono Band (1970), and on Harrison's albums All Things Must Pass (1970), Living in the Material World (1973) and Dark Horse (1974). In 1971, Starr participated in the Concert for Bangladesh, organised by Harrison, and with him co-wrote the hit single "It Don't Come Easy", which reached number four in both the US and the UK. The following year he released his most successful UK hit, "Back Off Boogaloo" (again produced and co-written by Harrison), which peaked at number two (US number nine). Having become friends with the English singer Marc Bolan, Starr made his directorial debut with the 1972 T. Rex documentary Born to Boogie.

==== 1973–1979: Ringo to Ringo the 4th ====
In 1973 and 1974, Starr had two number one hits in the US: "Photograph", a UK number eight hit co-written with Harrison, and "You're Sixteen", written by the Sherman Brothers. Starr's third million-selling single in the US, "You're Sixteen" was released in the UK in February 1974 where it peaked at number four. Both tracks appeared on Starr's debut rock album, Ringo, produced by Richard Perry and featuring further contributions from Harrison as well as a song each from Lennon and McCartney. A commercial and critical success, the LP also included "Oh My My", a US number five. The album reached number seven in the UK and number two in the US. Author Peter Doggett describes Ringo as a template for Starr's solo career, saying that, as a musician first rather than a songwriter, "he would rely on his friends and his charm, and if both were on tap, then the results were usually appealing".

Goodnight Vienna followed in 1974 and was also successful, reaching number eight in the US and number 30 in the UK. Featuring contributions from Lennon, Elton John and Harry Nilsson, the album included a cover (suggested by Lennon) of the Platters' 1954 hit "Only You (And You Alone)", which peaked at number six in the US and number 28 in the UK, and Hoyt Axton's "No No Song", which was a US number three and Starr's seventh consecutive top-ten hit. The Elton John-written "Snookeroo" failed to chart in the UK, however. In mid-November 1974, a music video for the song and promotional film for the album was filmed on the rooftop of the Capitol Records Building in Los Angeles, designed to resemble a stack of discs. Lennon provided a voiceover as Starr's spacecraft landed on the building and Starr boarded it before taking off over the city. Starr, Nilsson, and Keith Moon were among the cast, along with a forty-foot robot named 'Gort' placed on the building. During this period Starr became romantically involved with Lynsey de Paul. He played tambourine on a song she wrote and produced for Vera Lynn, "Don't You Remember When", and he inspired another De Paul song, "If I Don't Get You the Next One Will", which she described as being about revenge after he missed a dinner appointment with her because he was asleep in his office.

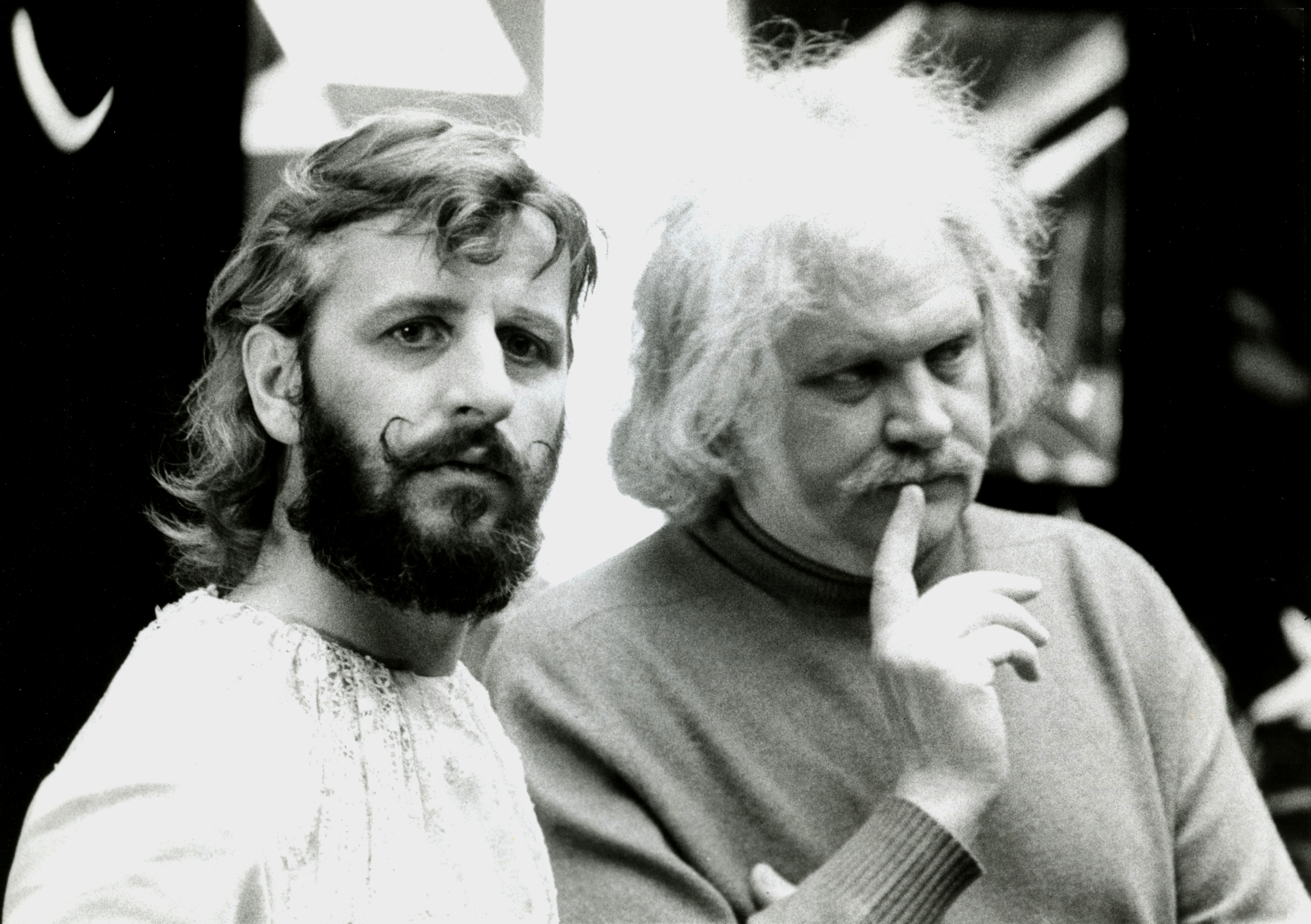
Starr and film director Ken Russell in 1975

Starr founded the record label Ring O' Records in 1975. (Note: In November that year, Starr's hit singles and other tracks were compiled on the greatest-hits collection Blast from Your Past, which was the last album released by Apple Records.) The company signed eleven artists and released fifteen singles and five albums between 1975 and 1978, including works by David Hentschel, Graham Bonnet and Rab Noakes. The commercial impact of Starr's own career diminished over the same period, however, although he continued to record and remained a familiar celebrity presence. Speaking in 2001, he attributed this downward turn to his "[not] taking enough interest" in music, saying of himself and friends such as Nilsson and Keith Moon: "We weren't musicians dabbling in drugs and alcohol; now we were junkies dabbling in music." Starr, Nilsson and Moon were members of a drinking club, the Hollywood Vampires.

From the late 1960s until the mid-1980s, Starr and the designer Robin Cruikshank ran a furniture and interior design company, ROR. ROR's designs were placed on sale in the department stores of Harvey Nichols and Liberty of London. The company designed the interiors of palaces in Abu Dhabi and Oman, and the apartments of Paul Raymond and Starr's friend Nilsson.

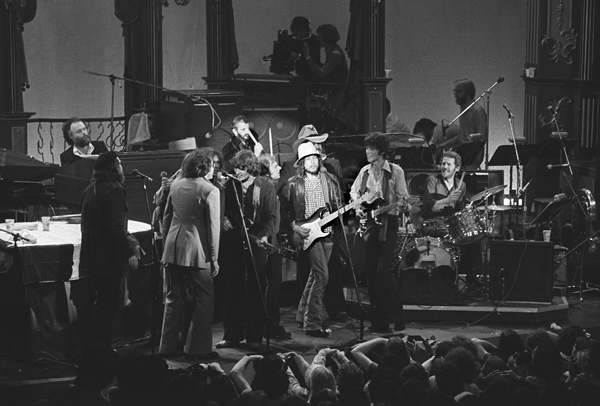
Starr (rear centre) drumming with Bob Dylan and the Band in November 1976, from the concert film The Last Waltz

In November 1976, Starr appeared as a guest at the Band's farewell concert, featured in the 1978 Martin Scorsese documentary The Last Waltz. Also in 1976, Starr issued Ringo's Rotogravure, the first release under his new contract with Atlantic Records for the North American market and Polydor for all other territories. The album was produced by Arif Mardin and featured compositions by Lennon, McCartney and Harrison. Starr promoted the release heavily, yet Rotogravure and its accompanying singles failed to chart in the UK. In America, the LP produced two minor hits, "A Dose of Rock 'n' Roll" (number 26) and a cover of "Hey! Baby" (number 74), and achieved moderate sales, reaching a chart position of 28. Its disappointing performance inspired Atlantic to revamp Starr's formula; the result was a blend of disco and 1970s pop, Ringo the 4th (1977). The album failed to chart in the UK and peaked at number 162 in the US. In 1978 Starr released Bad Boy, which reached number 129 in the US and again failed to place on the UK albums chart.

In April 1979, Starr became seriously ill with intestinal problems relating to his childhood bout of peritonitis, and was taken to the Princess Grace Hospital in Monte Carlo. He almost died, and during an operation on 28 April, several feet of intestine had to be removed. Three weeks later, he played alongside McCartney and Harrison at Eric Clapton's wedding. On 28 November, a fire destroyed his Hollywood home and much of his Beatles memorabilia.

==== 1980–1989: Stop and Smell the Roses, Old Wave, and public social work ====
On 19 May 1980, Starr and Barbara Bach survived a car crash in Surrey, England.

Following Lennon's murder in December 1980, Harrison modified the lyrics of a song he had originally written for Starr, "All Those Years Ago", as a tribute to their former bandmate. Released as a Harrison single in 1981, the track, which included Starr's drum part and overdubbed backing vocals by McCartney, peaked at number two in the US charts and number 13 in the UK. Later that year, Starr released Stop and Smell the Roses, featuring songs produced by Nilsson, McCartney, Harrison, Ronnie Wood and Stephen Stills. The album's lead single, the Harrison-composed "Wrack My Brain", reached number 38 in the US charts, but failed to chart in the UK. Lennon had offered a pair of songs for inclusion on the album – "Nobody Told Me" and "Life Begins at 40" – but following his death, Starr did not feel comfortable recording them. Soon after the murder, Starr and his girlfriend Barbara Bach flew to New York City to be with Lennon's widow Yoko Ono. (Note: From 1981 onwards, Starr also worked on McCartney's solo recordings for the first time. With Martin producing the sessions, Starr's playing appeared on the McCartney albums Tug of War (1982), Pipes of Peace (1983) and Give My Regards to Broad Street (1984).)

Following Stop and Smell the Roses, Starr's recording projects were beset with problems. After completing Old Wave in 1982 with producer Joe Walsh, he was unable to find a record company willing to release the album in the UK or the US. In 1987, he abandoned sessions in Memphis for a planned country album, produced by Chips Moman, after which Moman was blocked by a court injunction from issuing the recordings. Starr narrated the first and second seasons of the children's television series Thomas & Friends, a Britt Allcroft production based on the books by the Reverend W. Awdry. For a single season in 1989, Starr also portrayed the character Mr. Conductor in the American Thomas & Friends spin-off, Shining Time Station.

In 1985, Starr performed with his son Zak as part of Artists United Against Apartheid on the protest song "Sun City", and, with Harrison and Eric Clapton, was among the special guests on Carl Perkins' TV special Blue Suede Shoes: A Rockabilly Session. In 1987, he played drums on Harrison's Beatles pastiche "When We Was Fab" and also appeared in Godley & Creme's innovative video clip for the song. The same year, Starr joined Harrison, Clapton, Jeff Lynne and Elton John in a performance at London's Wembley Arena for the Prince's Trust charity. In January 1988, he attended the Rock and Roll Hall of Fame ceremony in New York, with Harrison and Ono (the latter representing Lennon), to accept the Beatles' induction into the Hall of Fame.

During October and November 1988, Starr and Bach attended a detox clinic in Tucson, Arizona; each received a six-week treatment for alcoholism. He later commented on his longstanding addiction: "Years I've lost, absolute years ... I've no idea what happened. I lived in a blackout." (Note: Starr experienced his first alcoholic blackout at the age of nine.) Having embraced sobriety, Starr focused on re-establishing his career by making a return to touring. On 23 July 1989, Ringo Starr & His All-Starr Band gave their first performance to an audience of ten thousand in Dallas, Texas. Setting a pattern that would continue over the following decades, the band consisted of Starr and an assortment of musicians who had been successful in their own right at different times. The concerts interchanged Starr's singing, including selections of his Beatles and solo songs, with performances of each of the other artists' well-known material, the latter incorporating either Starr or another musician as drummer.

==== 1990–1997: Ringo Starr and His All-Starr Band, Time Takes Time, and Beatles Anthology ====
The first All-Starr excursion led to the release of Ringo Starr and His All-Starr Band (1990), a compilation of live performances from the 1989 tour. (Note: Since the early 1990s, Starr has continued to issue live albums from his All-Starr Band tours. Among these releases are Live from Montreux (1993) and Live at the Greek Theatre (2008).) Also in 1990, Starr recorded a version of the song "I Call Your Name" for a television special marking the 10th anniversary of John Lennon's death and the 50th anniversary of Lennon's birth. The track, produced by Lynne, features a supergroup composed of Lynne, Tom Petty, Joe Walsh and Jim Keltner.

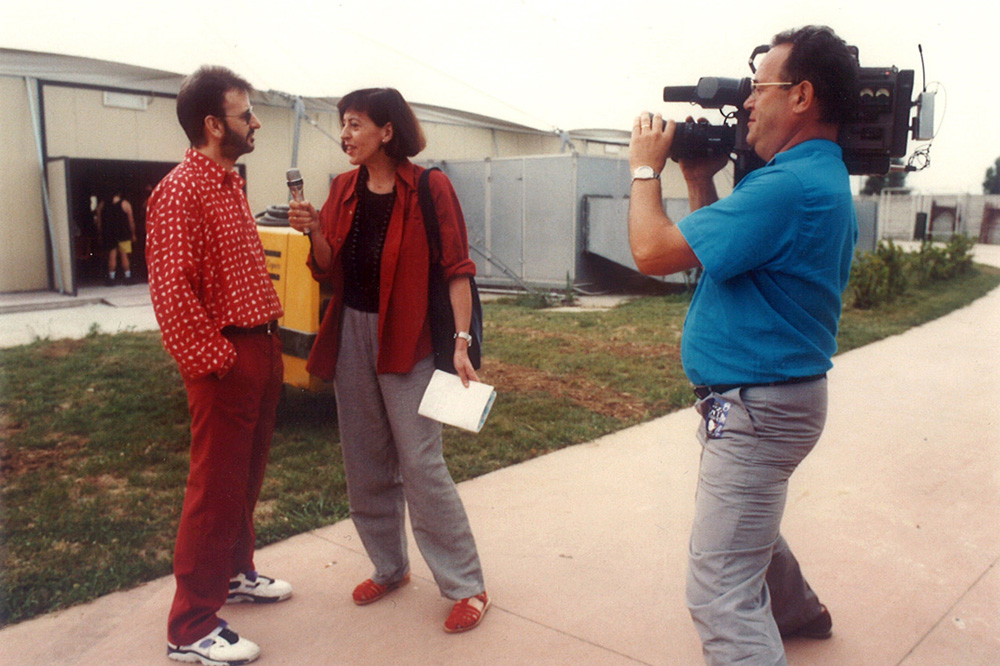
Starr during an interview in 1992

The following year, Starr made a cameo appearance on The Simpsons episode "Brush with Greatness" and contributed an original song, "You Never Know", to the soundtrack of the John Hughes film Curly Sue. In 1992, he released his first studio album in nine years, Time Takes Time, which was produced by Phil Ramone, Don Was, Lynne and Peter Asher and featured guest appearances by various stars including Brian Wilson and Harry Nilsson. The album failed to achieve commercial success, although the single "Weight of the World" peaked at number 74 in the UK, marking his first appearance on the singles chart there since "Only You" in 1974.

In 1994, Starr began a collaboration with the surviving former Beatles for the Beatles Anthology project. They recorded two new Beatles songs built around solo vocal and piano tapes recorded by Lennon and gave lengthy interviews about the Beatles' career. Released in December 1995, "Free as a Bird" was the first new Beatles single since 1970. In March 1996, they released a second single, "Real Love". The temporary reunion ended when Harrison refused to participate in the completion of a third song. Starr then played drums on McCartney's 1997 album Flaming Pie. Among the tracks to which he contributed, "Little Willow" was a song McCartney wrote about Starr's ex-wife Maureen, who died in 1994, while "Really Love You" was the first official release ever credited to McCartney–Starkey.

==== 1998–2003: Mercury albums and Ringo Rama ====
In 1998, Starr released two albums on the Mercury label. The studio album Vertical Man marked the beginning of a nine-year partnership with Mark Hudson, who produced the album and, with his band the Roundheads, formed the core of the backing group on the recordings. In addition, many famous guests joined on various tracks, including Martin, Petty, McCartney and, in his final appearance on a Starr album, Harrison. Most of the songs were written by Starr and the band. Joe Walsh and the Roundheads joined Starr for his appearance on VH1 Storytellers, which was released as an album under the same name. During the show, he performed greatest hits and new songs and told anecdotes relating to them. Starr's final release for Mercury was the 1999 Christmas-themed I Wanna Be Santa Claus. The album was a commercial failure, although the record company chose not to issue it in Britain.

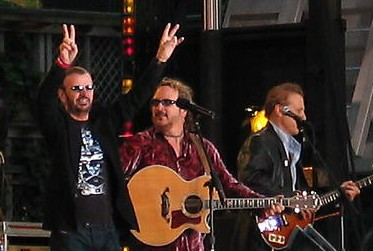
Starr (left) on stage in New York City in 2005

Starr was inducted into the Percussive Arts Society Hall of Fame in 2002, joining an elite group of drummers and percussionists that include Buddy Rich, William F. Ludwig Sr. and William F. Ludwig Jr. On 29 November 2002 (the first anniversary of Harrison's death), he performed "Photograph" and a cover of Carl Perkins' "Honey Don't" at the Concert for George held in the Royal Albert Hall, London. Early the following year, he released the album Ringo Rama, which contained a song he co-wrote as a tribute to Harrison, "Never Without You". Also in 2003, he formed Pumkinhead Records with All-Starr Band member Mark Hudson. The label was not prolific, but their first signing was Liam Lynch, who produced a 2003 LP entitled Fake Songs.

==== 2003–2009: Choose Love and Liverpool 8 ====
Starr served as an honorary Santa Tracker and voice-over personality in 2003 and 2004 during the London stop in Father Christmas's annual Christmas Eve journey, as depicted in the annual NORAD tracks Santa program. According to NORAD officials, he was "a Starr in the east" who helped guide North American Aerospace Defense Command's Santa-tracking tradition.

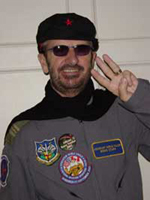
Starr as an Honorary Santa Tracker in 2004

His 2005 release Choose Love eschewed the star-guests approach of his last two studio albums but failed to chart in the UK or the US. That same year, Liverpool's City Council announced plans to demolish Starr's birthplace, 9 Madryn Street, stating that it had "no historical significance". The LCC later announced that the building would be taken apart brick by brick and preserved.

Starr released the album Liverpool 8 in January 2008, coinciding with the start of Liverpool's year as the European Capital of Culture. Hudson was the initial producer of the recordings, but after a falling out with Starr, he was replaced by David A. Stewart. Starr performed the title track at the opening ceremony for Liverpool's appointment, but thereafter attracted controversy over his seemingly unflattering comments about his city of birth. Later that year, he was the object of further criticism in the press for posting a video on his website in which he harangued fans and autograph hunters for sending him items to sign. (Note: In the video, posted on 10 October 2008, Starr told fans that he was too busy and would not be signing autographs after 20 October.)

In April 2009, Starr reunited with McCartney at the David Lynch Foundation's "Change Begins Within" benefit concert, held at New York's Radio City Music Hall. Having played his own set beforehand, Starr joined McCartney for the finale and performed "With a Little Help from My Friends", among other songs. Starr also appeared on-stage during Microsoft's June 2009 E3 press conference with Yoko Ono, McCartney and Olivia Harrison to promote The Beatles: Rock Band video game.

==== 2010–2019: Five albums and Ringo Starr & His All-Star Band 30th Anniversary Tour ====
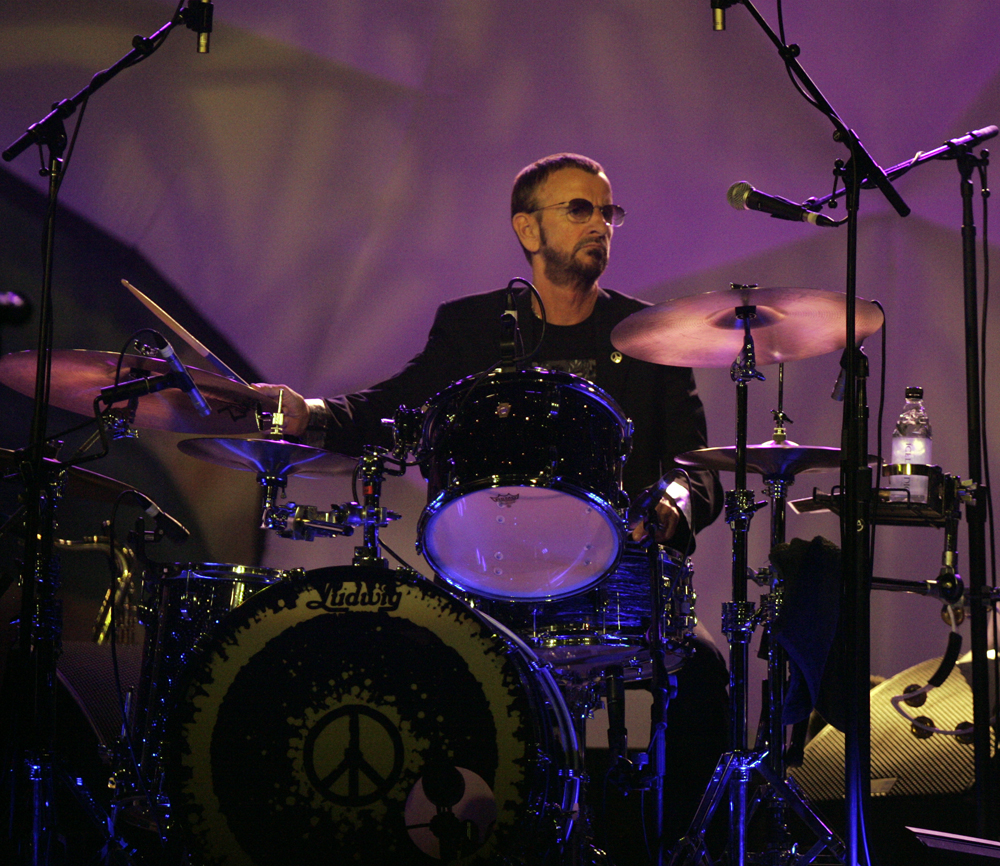
Starr performing in 2013

In 2010, Starr self-produced and released his fifteenth studio album, Y Not, which included the track "Walk with You" and featured a vocal contribution from McCartney. Later that year, he appeared during Hope for Haiti Now: A Global Benefit for Earthquake Relief as a celebrity phone operator. On 7 July 2010, he celebrated his 70th birthday at Radio City Music Hall with another All-Starr Band concert, topped with friends and family joining him on stage including Ono, his son Zak, and McCartney.

Starr recorded a cover of Buddy Holly's "Think It Over" for the 2011 tribute album Listen to Me: Buddy Holly. In January 2012, he released the album Ringo 2012. Later that year, he announced that his All-Starr Band would tour the Pacific Rim during 2013 with select dates in New Zealand, Australia and Japan; it was his first performance in Japan since 1996, and his debut in both New Zealand and Australia.

In January 2014, Starr joined McCartney for a special performance at the 56th Annual Grammy Awards in Los Angeles, where they performed the song "Queenie Eye". That summer he toured Canada and the US with an updated version of the Twelfth All-Starr Band, featuring multi-instrumentalist Warren Ham instead of saxophonist Mark Rivera. In July, Starr became involved in "#peacerocks", an anti-violence campaign started by fashion designer John Varvatos, in conjunction with the David Lynch Foundation. In September 2014, he won at the GQ Men of the Year Awards for his humanitarian work with the David Lynch Foundation.

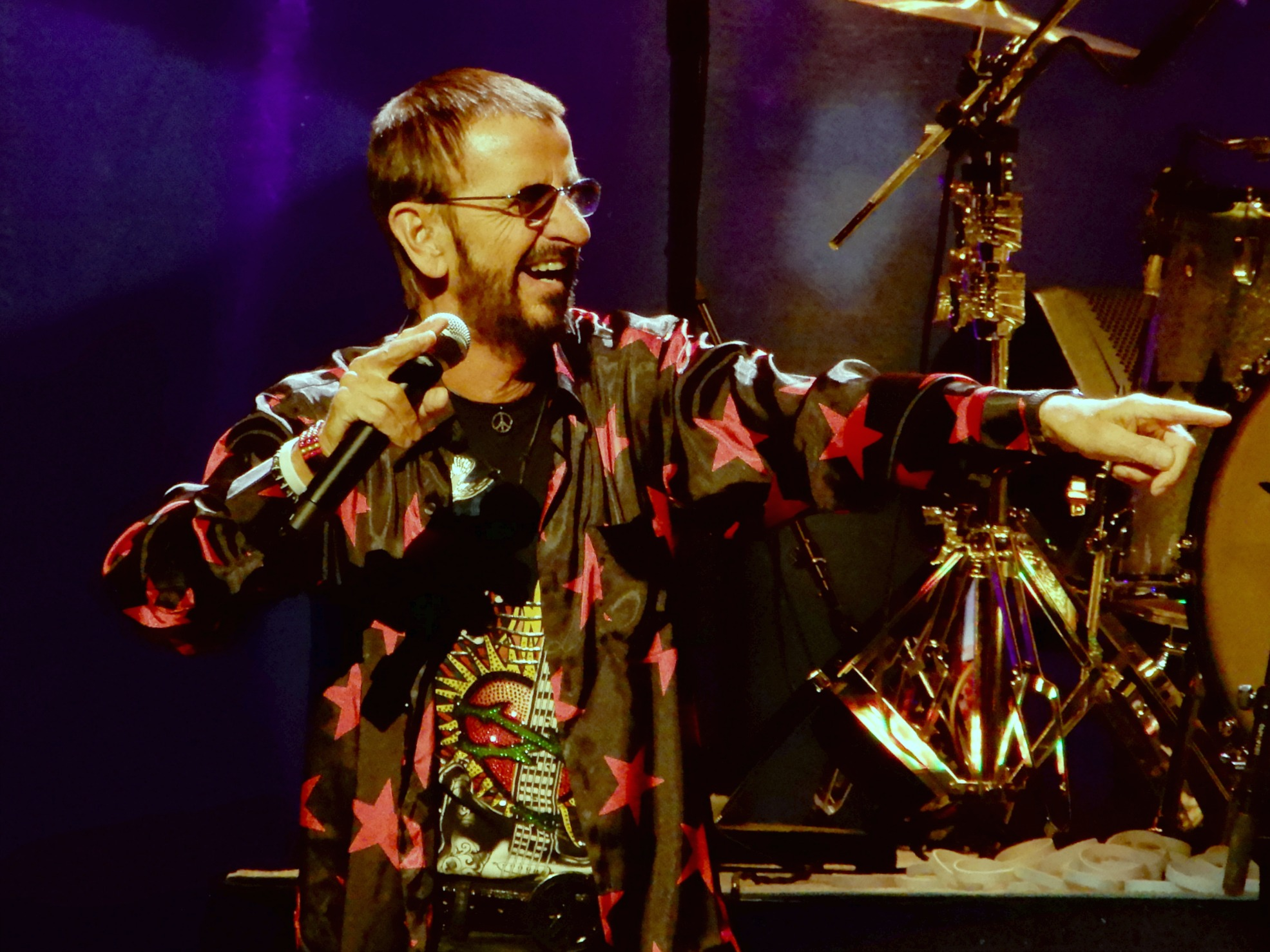
Starr performing in 2017

In January 2015, Starr tweeted the title of his new studio album Postcards from Paradise. The album came a few weeks in advance of Starr's induction into the Rock and Roll Hall of Fame, and was released on 31 March 2015 to mixed to positive reviews. Later that month, Starr and his band announced a forthcoming Summer 2016 Tour of the US. Full production began in June 2016 in Syracuse.

On 7 July 2017 (his 77th birthday), Starr released "Give More Love" as a single, which was followed two months later by his nineteenth studio album, also titled Give More Love and issued by UMe. The album includes appearances by McCartney, as well as frequent collaborators such as Joe Walsh, David A. Stewart, Gary Nicholson and members of the All-Starr Band.

In June 2018, Starr embarked on a 44-date tour across Europe and North America with his All-Starr Band. As part of the tour, he performed two consecutive concerts at the Menora Mivtachim Arena in Tel Aviv, where he shared a message of "peace and love" with his fans. These shows marked his first performances in Israel, making him the second former Beatle to play in the country after Paul McCartney's 2008 concert in Tel Aviv.

On 13 September 2019, Starr announced the upcoming release of his 20th album, What's My Name, to be released by UMe on 25 October 2019. He recorded the album in his home studio, Roccabella West in Los Angeles.

==== 2020–present ====
In celebration of his 80th birthday in July 2020, Starr organised a live-streamed concert featuring appearances by many of his friends and collaborators including McCartney, Walsh, Ben Harper, Dave Grohl, Sheryl Crow, Sheila E. and Willie Nelson. The show replaced his annual public birthday celebration at the Capitol Records Building, which was cancelled due to the COVID-19 pandemic.

On 16 December 2020, Starr released the song "Here's to the Nights". An accompanying video was released on 18 December. The song of peace, love and friendship was written by Diane Warren and features a group of his friends, including McCartney, Joe Walsh, Corinne Bailey Rae, Eric Burdon, Sheryl Crow, Finneas, Dave Grohl, Ben Harper, Lenny Kravitz, Jenny Lewis, Steve Lukather, Chris Stapleton and Yola. The song was the lead single from his EP Zoom In, which was released on 19 March 2021 via UMe.

On 16 March 2021, Starr stated in an interview with Esquire that it was unlikely that he would record another full-length album, preferring to release EPs instead. On 24 September that year, he released the EP Change the World, a sequel to the previous EP Zoom In.

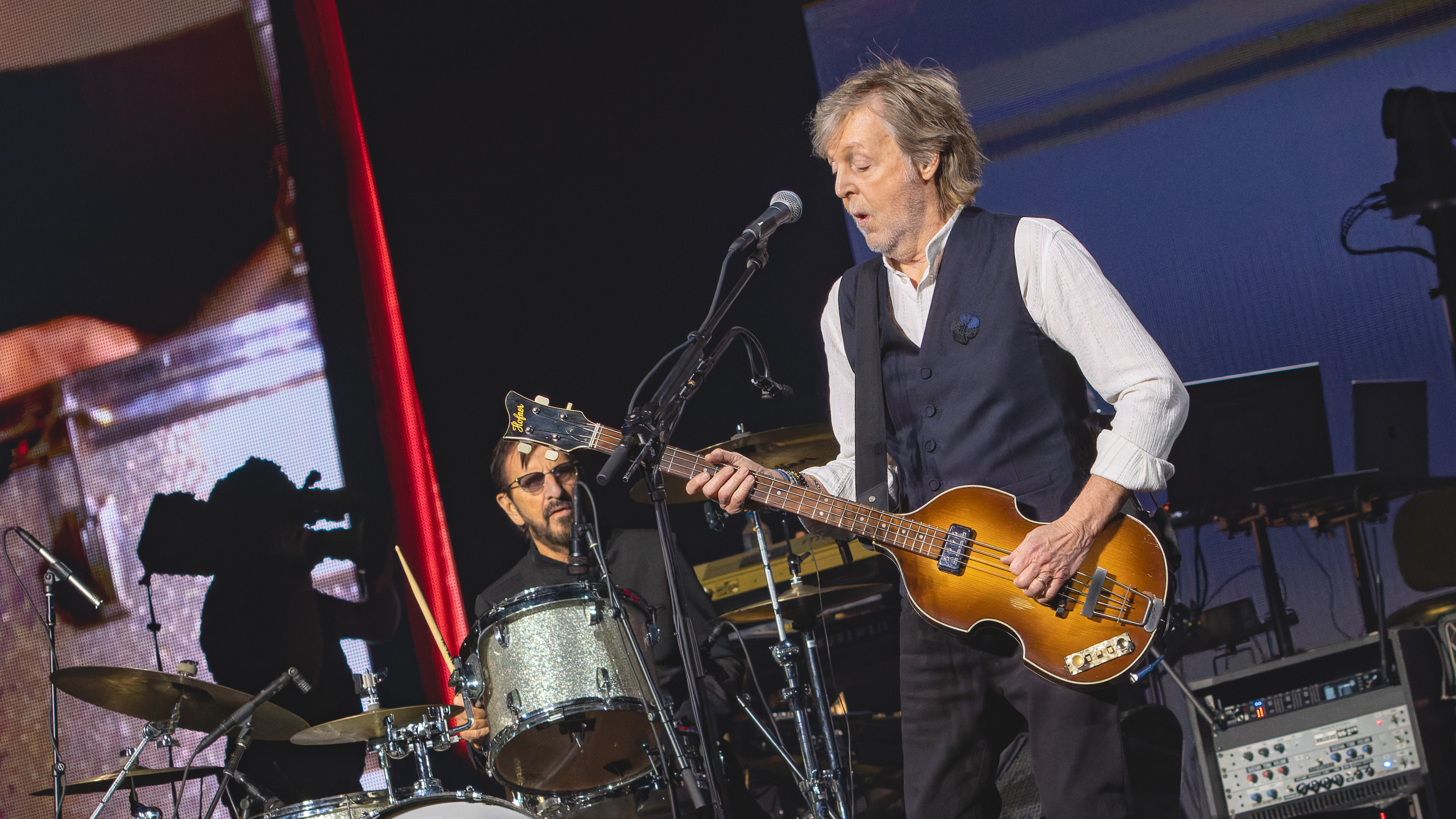
Starr and Paul McCartney performing together in London, 2024

On 7 February 2022, Starr announced his intention to return to touring with his band for the first time since 2019. The tour was announced to run from 27 May to 26 June, though several concerts held in June would end up being postponed till October due to two members of the band catching COVID-19. These postponed events were added to the band's previously announced tour to be held in September and October. On 1 October, he cancelled a concert at the Four Winds New Buffalo casino due to an unspecified illness affecting his voice. Another concert to be held at Mystic Lake Casino Hotel the following day was also postponed. On 3 October, it was confirmed that Starr had tested positive for COVID-19, after which several shows in Canada were cancelled.

On 16 September 2022, Starr released the EP EP3. On 12 January 2023, Starr announced that he and the All-Starr Band would be touring in the US from 19 May to 17 June. In May 2023, a further series of tour dates was also announced, from 17 September to 13 October. Another EP by Starr, Rewind Forward, released on 13 October. Another, Crooked Boy, was initially released as a Record Store Day exclusive in 2024, with digital and physical releases on 26 April and 31 May, respectively. Despite previous statements that he would no longer release full albums, a country and roots album, Look Up, produced by T Bone Burnett, was released on 10 January 2025. Look Up went on to become the first number one album of Starr's career, reaching number one in both the UK Country Albums Chart and the Official Americana Albums Chart.

A second country album, Long Long Road, which was announced in March 2026, was released on 24 April of the same year. It was Starr's second collaboration in a row with Burnett, and included features from Billy Strings, Sheryl Crow, St. Vincent, Molly Tuttle and Sarah Jarosz. In April, Starr announced his plans to release a new EP with collaborator Bruce Sugar. Starr duetted with Paul McCartney on McCartney's single "Home to Us", released on 8 May.

== Artistry ==
=== Influences ===
During his youth, Starr had been a devoted fan of skiffle and blues music, but by the time he joined the Texans in 1958, he had developed a preference for rock and roll. He was also influenced by country artists, including Hank Williams, Buck Owens and Hank Snow, and jazz artists such as Chico Hamilton and Yusef Lateef, whose compositional style inspired Starr's fluid and energetic drum fills and grooves. While reflecting on Buddy Rich, Starr commented: "He does things with one hand that I can't do with nine, but that's technique. Everyone I talk to says 'What about Buddy Rich?' Well, what about him? Because he doesn't turn me on." He stated that he "was never really into drummers", but identified Cozy Cole's 1958 cover of Benny Goodman's "Topsy Part Two" as "the one drum record" he bought.

Starr's first musical hero was Gene Autry, about whom he commented: "I remember getting shivers up my back when he sang, 'South of the Border'". By the early 1960s he had become an ardent fan of Lee Dorsey. In November 1964, Starr told Melody Maker: "Our music is second-hand versions of negro music [...] Ninety per cent of the music I like is coloured."

=== Drums ===
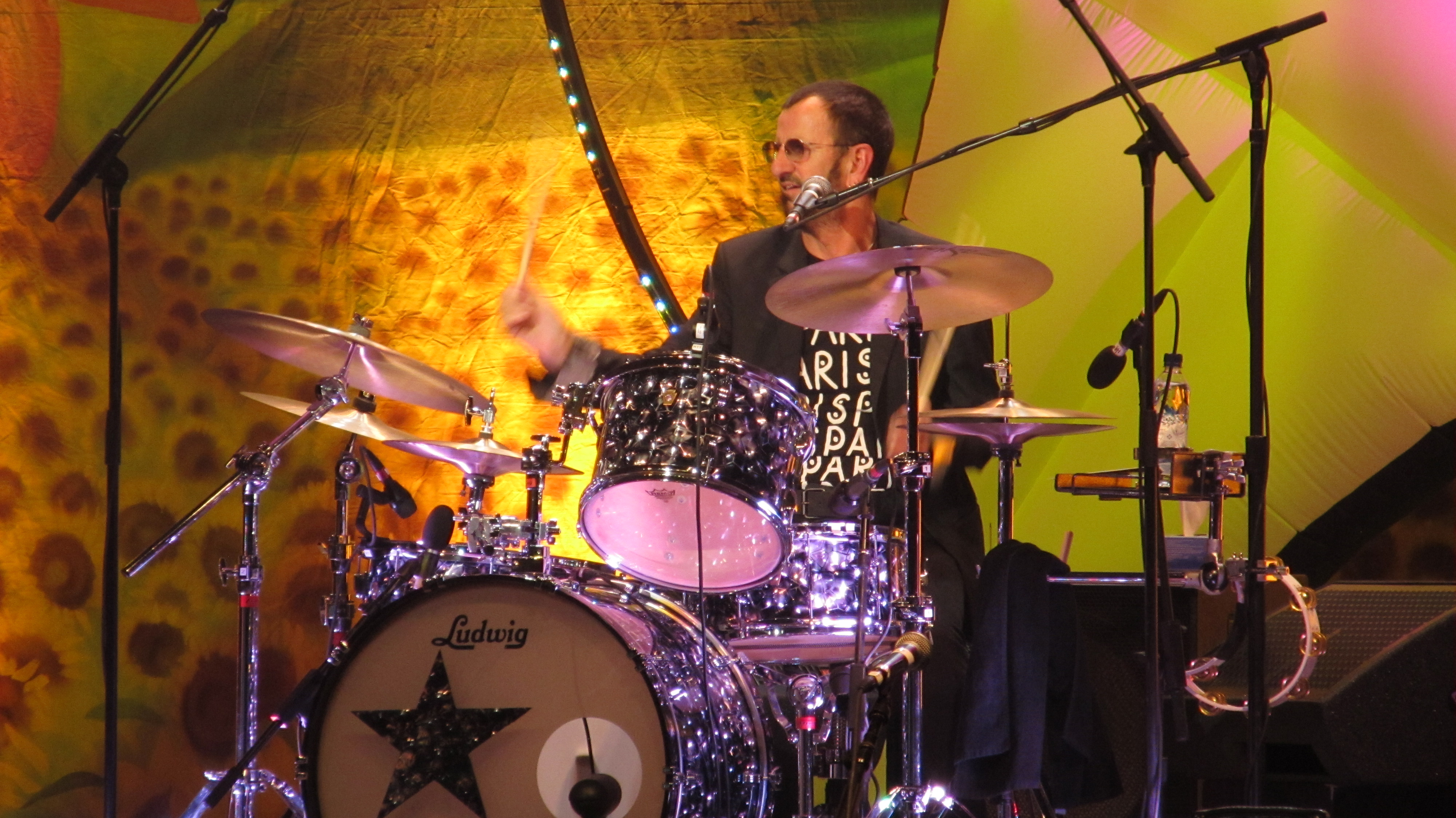
Starr with his All-Starr Band in Paris, 26 June 2011

Starr said of his drumming: "I'm no good on the technical things [...] I'm your basic offbeat drummer with funny fills [...] because I'm really left-handed playing a right-handed kit. I can't roll around the drums because of that." Beatles producer George Martin said: "Ringo hit good and hard and used the tom-tom well, even though he couldn't do a roll to save his life", but later said, "He's got tremendous feel. He always helped us to hit the right tempo for a song, and gave it that support – that rock-solid back-beat – that made the recording of all the Beatles' songs that much easier." Starr said he did not believe the drummer's role was to "interpret the song". Instead, comparing his drumming to painting, he said: "I am the foundation, and then I put a bit of glow here and there [...] If there's a gap, I want to be good enough to fill it."

In 2011, Rolling Stone readers voted Starr the fifth-greatest drummer of all time. Journalist Robyn Flans wrote for the Percussive Arts Society: "I cannot count the number of drummers who have told me that Ringo inspired their passion for drums". Drummer Steve Smith said:

Before Ringo, drum stars were measured by their soloing ability and virtuosity. Ringo's popularity brought forth a new paradigm in how the public saw drummers. We started to see the drummer as an equal participant in the compositional aspect. One of Ringo's great qualities was that he composed unique, stylistic drum parts for the Beatles' songs. His parts are so signature to the songs that you can listen to a Ringo drum part without the rest of the music and still identify the song.

Starr said his favourite drummer is Jim Keltner, with whom he first played at the Concert for Bangladesh in August 1971. The pair subsequently played drums together on some of Harrison's recordings during the 1970s, on Ringo and other albums by Starr, and on the early All-Starr Band tours. For Ringo's Rotogravure in 1976, Starr credited himself as "Thunder" and Keltner as "Lightnin'".

Starr is widely known for sitting behind the drum kit in a higher position than most drummers. This position gives him better access to the tom-tom and cymbals as well as doing the rimshot.

Starr influenced the Genesis drummer Phil Collins, who said: "I think he's vastly underrated, Ringo. The drum fills on 'A Day in the Life' are very, very complex things. You could take a great drummer from today and say, 'I want it like that', and they really wouldn't know what to do." Collins said his drumming on the 1983 Genesis song "That's All" was an affectionate attempt at a "Ringo Starr drum part".

In an often-repeated but apocryphal story, when asked if Starr was the best drummer in the world, Lennon quipped that he "wasn't even the best drummer in the Beatles". The line actually comes from a 1981 episode of the BBC Radio 4 comedy series Radio Active, and gained more prominence when it was used by the television comedian Jasper Carrott in 1983, three years after Lennon's death. In September 1980, Lennon told Rolling Stone that Starr was a "damn good drummer" whose talent would have surfaced even without the Beatles.

Tjinder Singh of the indie rock band Cornershop said Starr was a pioneering drummer: "There was a time when the common consensus was that Ringo couldn't play. What's that all about? He's totally unique, a one-off, and hip-hop has a lot to thank him for." In his book The Complete Beatles Recording Sessions, Mark Lewisohn says there were fewer than a dozen occasions in the Beatles' eight-year recording career where session breakdowns were caused by Starr making a mistake, while the vast majority of takes were stopped due to mistakes by the other Beatles. Starr influenced various modern drumming techniques, such as the matched grip, tuning the drums lower, and using muffling devices on tonal rings. According to Ken Micallef and Donnie Marshall, co-authors of Classic Rock Drummers: "Ringo's fat tom sounds and delicate cymbal work were imitated by thousands of drummers."

In 2021, Starr announced a ten-part MasterClass course called "Drumming and Creative Collaboration".

=== Vocals ===
Starr sang lead vocals for a song on most of the Beatles' studio albums as part of an attempt to establish a vocal personality for each band member. In many cases, Lennon or McCartney wrote the lyrics and melody especially for him, as they did for "Yellow Submarine" from Revolver and "With a Little Help from My Friends" on Sgt. Pepper's Lonely Hearts Club Band. These melodies were tailored to Starr's limited baritone vocal range. Because of his distinctive voice, Starr rarely performed backing vocals during his time with the Beatles, but they can be heard on songs such as "Maxwell's Silver Hammer" and "Carry That Weight". He is also the lead vocalist on his compositions "Don't Pass Me By" and "Octopus's Garden". In addition, he sang lead on "I Wanna Be Your Man", "Boys", "Matchbox", "Honey Don't", "Act Naturally", "Good Night" and "What Goes On".

=== Songwriting ===
Starr's idiosyncratic turns of phrase or "Ringoisms", such as "a hard day's night" and "tomorrow never knows", were used as song titles by the Beatles, particularly by Lennon. McCartney commented: "Ringo would do these little malapropisms, he would say things slightly wrong, like people do, but his were always wonderful, very lyrical [...] they were sort of magic." Starr also occasionally contributed lyrics to unfinished Lennon–McCartney songs, such as the line "darning his socks in the night when there's nobody there" in "Eleanor Rigby".

Starr is credited as the sole composer of two Beatles songs: "Don't Pass Me By" and "Octopus's Garden", the latter written with assistance from Harrison. While promoting the Abbey Road album in 1969, Harrison recognised Starr's lyrics to "Octopus's Garden" as an unwittingly profound message about finding inner peace, and therefore an example of how "Ringo writes his cosmic songs without knowing it." Starr is also credited as a co-writer of "What Goes On", "Flying" and "Dig It". (Note: "What Goes On" was a pre-Beatles Lennon song to which McCartney added a middle eight in an effort to provide Starr a lead vocal on Rubber Soul.) On material issued after the band's break-up, he received a writing credit for "Taking a Trip to Carolina" and joint songwriting credits with the other Beatles for "12-Bar Original", "Los Paranoias", "Christmas Time (Is Here Again)", "Suzy Parker" (from the Let It Be film), "Jessie's Dream" (from the Magical Mystery Tour film), "Free as a Bird" and "Now and Then".

In a 2003 interview, Starr discussed Harrison's input in his songwriting and said: "I was great at writing two verses and a chorus – I'm still pretty good at that. Finishing songs is not my forte." Harrison helped Starr complete two of his biggest hit songs, "It Don't Come Easy" and "Back Off Boogaloo", although he only accepted a credit for "Photograph", which they wrote together in France. Starting with the Ringo album in 1973, Starr shared a songwriting partnership with Vini Poncia. One of the pair's first collaborations was "Oh My My". Over half of the songs on Ringo the 4th were Starkey–Poncia compositions, but the partnership produced just two more songs, released on Bad Boy in 1978.

== Personal life ==
In the same week Starr joined the Beatles in 1962, he met 16-year-old hairdresser Maureen Cox. They married at Caxton Hall on 11 February 1965. Starr's stepfather Harry Graves and fellow Beatles George Harrison and John Lennon were all witnesses, while Beatles manager Brian Epstein served as best man. Their marriage became the subject of the novelty song "Treat Him Tender, Maureen" by the Chicklettes. The couple had three children: Zak (b. 13 September 1965), Jason (b. 19 August 1967) and Lee (b. 11 November 1970). In 1971, Starr purchased Lennon's home Tittenhurst Park at Sunninghill in Berkshire and moved his family there. The couple divorced in 1975 following Starr's repeated infidelities, alcoholism, and volatile behaviour. Cox died from leukaemia at the age of 48 in December 1994.

In 1985, Starr was the first of the Beatles to become a grandfather upon the birth of Zak's daughter Tatia Jayne Starkey. Zak is also a drummer, and he spent time with the Who's Keith Moon during his father's regular absences; he has performed with his father during some All-Starr Band tours. Starr has eight grandchildren: two from Zak, three from Jason, and three from Lee. In 2016, he was the first Beatle to become a great-grandfather.

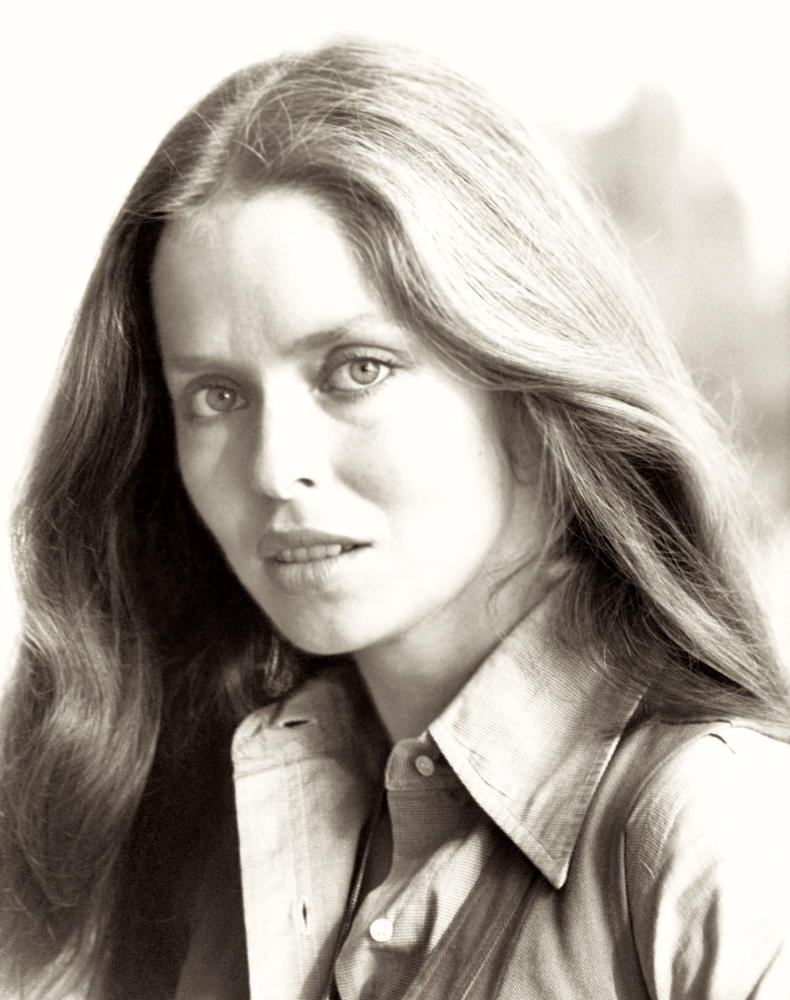
Barbara Bach in 1978

Starr met actress Barbara Bach in 1980 on the set of the film Caveman, and they were married at Marylebone Town Hall on 27 April 1981. Starr and Bach split their time between homes in Cranleigh in Surrey, Los Angeles, and Monte Carlo. He was listed at number 56 in the Sunday Times Rich List 2011 with an estimated personal wealth of £150 million. In 2012, he was estimated to be the wealthiest drummer in the world. In 2014, Starr announced that his 200-acre (81 ha) Surrey estate at Rydinghurst at Cranleigh was for sale, with its Grade II-listed Jacobean house. However, he retains a property in the London district of Chelsea off King's Road, and he and Bach continue to divide their time between London and Los Angeles.

In December 2015, Starr and Bach auctioned some of their personal and professional items via Julien's Auctions in Los Angeles. The collection included Starr's first Ludwig Black Oyster Pearl drum kit, instruments given to him by Harrison, Lennon, and Marc Bolan, and a first-pressing copy of the Beatles' White Album numbered "0000001". The auction raised over $9 million, a portion of which was set aside for the Lotus Foundation, a charity founded by Starr and Bach.

In 2016, Starr expressed his support for the United Kingdom's withdrawal from the European Union. "I thought the European Union was a great idea," he said, "but I didn't see it going anywhere lately." In 2017, he described his impatience for Britain to "get on with" Brexit, declaring that "to be in control of your country is a good move".

In October 2021, Starr was named in the Pandora Papers, which alleged secret financial deals among politicians and celebrities using tax havens in an effort to avoid the payment of owed taxes.

Starr is a vegetarian. Mary McCartney confirmed he is allergic to garlic and onions. He meditates daily, and his catchphrase and motto for life is "peace and love".

== Awards and honours ==
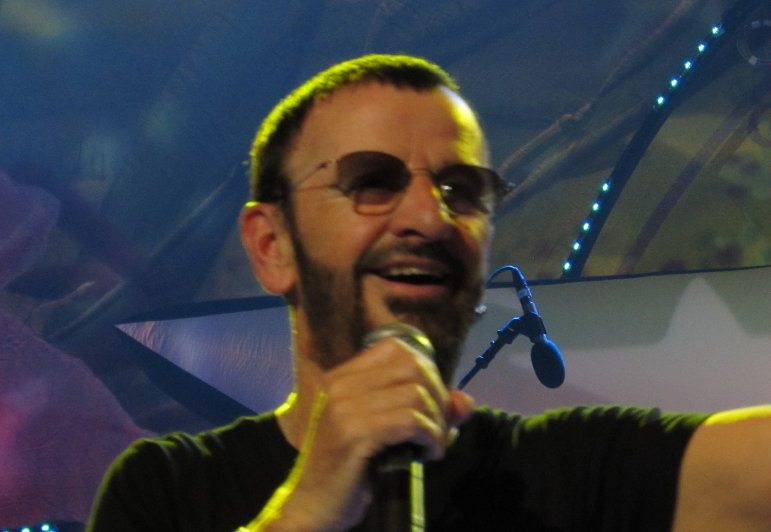
Starr performing in Paris, June 2011

Starr and the other members of the Beatles were appointed Members of the Order of the British Empire (MBE) in the 1965 Birthday Honours; they received their insignia from Queen Elizabeth II at an investiture at Buckingham Palace on 26 October. He and the other Beatles were collectively nominated for a BAFTA Award for Best Newcomer for their performances in the 1964 film A Hard Day's Night. In 1971, the Beatles received an Academy Award for Best Original Song Score for the film Let It Be. The minor planet 4150 Starr, discovered on 31 August 1984 by Brian A. Skiff at the Anderson Mesa Station of the Lowell Observatory, was named in Starr's honour. Starr was nominated for a 1989 Daytime Emmy Award for Outstanding Performer in a Children's Series for his role as Mr. Conductor in the television series Shining Time Station.

In 2015, 27 years after he was inducted into the Rock and Roll Hall of Fame as one of the Beatles, Starr became the last Beatle to be inducted for a solo career. Unlike the other three Beatles who were inducted within the "Performers" category, Starr was inducted within the "Musical Excellence" category. During the 50th Grammy Awards, Starr, George Martin and his son Giles accepted the Best Compilation Soundtrack award for Love. On 9 November 2008, Starr accepted a Diamond Award on behalf of the Beatles during the 2008 World Music Awards ceremony in Monaco. On 8 February 2010, he was honoured with the 2,401st star on the Hollywood Walk of Fame by the Hollywood Chamber of Commerce. It is located at 1750 North Vine Street, in front of the Capitol Records building, as are the stars for Lennon, McCartney and Harrison.

Starr was appointed a Knight Bachelor in the 2018 New Year Honours for services to music. He was knighted in an investiture ceremony at Buckingham Palace by Prince William, Duke of Cambridge on 20 March 2018.

In 2022, Starr received an honorary Doctor of Music degree from the Berklee College of Music for his "immeasurable impact on music, film and television, and popular culture".

== Film career ==
Starr has received praise from critics and movie industry professionals regarding his acting; director and producer Walter Shenson called him "a superb actor, an absolute natural". By the mid-1960s, Starr had become a connoisseur of film. In addition to his roles in A Hard Day's Night (1964), Help! (1965), Magical Mystery Tour (1967) and Let It Be (1970), Starr also acted in Candy (1968), The Magic Christian (1969), Blindman (1971), Son of Dracula (1974) and Caveman (1981). In 1971, he starred as Larry the Dwarf in Frank Zappa's 200 Motels and was featured in Harry Nilsson's animated film The Point! He co-starred in That'll Be the Day (1973) as a Teddy Boy and appeared in The Last Waltz, the Martin Scorsese documentary film about the 1976 farewell concert of the Band.

Starr played the Pope in Ken Russell's Lisztomania (1975), and a fictionalised version of himself in McCartney's Give My Regards to Broad Street in 1984. Starr appeared as himself and a downtrodden alter-ego Ognir Rrats in Ringo (1978), an American-made television comedy film based loosely on The Prince and the Pauper. For the 1979 documentary film on the Who, The Kids Are Alright, Starr appeared in interview segments with fellow drummer Keith Moon.

== Discography ==
Since the breakup of the Beatles, Starr has released 22 solo studio albums and five solo studio EPs:

=== Albums ===
- Sentimental Journey (1970)
- Beaucoups of Blues (1970)
- Ringo (1973)
- Goodnight Vienna (1974)
- Ringo's Rotogravure (1976)
- Ringo the 4th (1977)
- Bad Boy (1978)
- Stop and Smell the Roses (1981)
- Old Wave (1983)
- Time Takes Time (1992)
- Vertical Man (1998)
- I Wanna Be Santa Claus (1999)
- Ringo Rama (2003)
- Choose Love (2005)
- Liverpool 8 (2008)
- Y Not (2010)
- Ringo 2012 (2012)
- Postcards from Paradise (2015)
- Give More Love (2017)
- What's My Name (2019)
- Look Up (2025)
- Long Long Road (2026)

=== Extended plays ===
- Zoom In (2021)
- Change the World (2021)
- EP3 (2022)
- Rewind Forward (2023)
- Crooked Boy (2024)

== Bibliography ==
- Postcards from the Boys (2004)
- Octopus's Garden (2014)
- Photograph (2015)

== See also ==
- Outline of the Beatles
- Cultural impact of the Beatles
- The Beatles timeline
- List of British Grammy Award winners and nominees
- List of Thomas & Friends voice actors
