= Ringo (1978 film) =

- Genre: Comedy
- Written by: Neal Israel; Pat Proft
- Directed by: Jeff Margolis
- Starring: Ringo Starr; Art Carney; Angie Dickinson; Mike Douglas; Carrie Fisher; Vincent Price; John Ritter; George Harrison
- Country of origin: United States
- Original language: English

Production
- Executive producers: Peter L. Kauff; Robert B. Meyrowitz
- Producer: Ken Erhlich
- Production location: Los Angeles
- Editors: Pam Marshall; Andy Zall
- Production companies: D.I.R. Broadcasting; Montico Productions

Original release
- Network: NBC
- Release: April 26, 1978

Ringo is a 1978 American made-for-television comedy film, written by Neal Israel and Pat Proft. It stars Ringo Starr as both a fictionalised version of himself and his fictional doppelgänger. It was broadcast on the US NBC network on 26 April 1978.

The film features an all-star cast, including Art Carney, John Ritter, Carrie Fisher and George Harrison. Starr performs songs from his concurrent album, Bad Boy, as well as older material. The film's story is loosely based on Mark Twain's The Prince and the Pauper (1881).

Ringo finished 53rd of 65 network prime-time programs for the week.

== Plot ==
George Harrison holds a press conference concerning a Ringo Starr concert to be held that evening. Harrison tells a story of two babies born from different parents at the same time, in the same country, who happened to look identical. We see Starr living the life of a rock star, chauffeured around Los Angeles in a limousine, flanked by beautiful women, clearly bored and disillusioned. Conversely, his doppelgänger, Ognir Rrats, is selling maps to the stars' homes in Hollywood, is belittled and harassed by passersby and even has his bike run over by a city bus, all while dreaming of being a famous movie star and musician. Rrats lives in a small, humble home with an abusive father who steals all the money he makes.

Starr's manager Marty urges him to finish his new album, despite being exhausted and needing time to himself. Seeing Rrats on the street outside the studio, Starr wonders aloud why he couldn't lead a more "typical", "average" life like him and, after inviting Rrats into the studio, suggests the two exchange places for a few hours.

Starr, now masquerading as Rrats, runs into a few greasers on the street who harass him, thinking he's Rrats. He expresses a desire to take their fancy vintage car for a spin and offers them money for it, which they accept. He comes across Rrats' girlfriend Marquine, only to be accosted by Rrats' father, who drags him home.

Rrats, as Starr, accidentally signs an autograph as Ognir Rrats, confusing Marty, and then passes out when Marty tells him he's due to appear on The Mike Douglas Show in 15 minutes. Meanwhile, Starr is grounded by Rrats' father and fails to convince him that he's actually Ringo Starr. Starr, who bemoans the fact that he's gone from "one prison to another", catches Rrats (as him) on The Mike Douglas Show, who is clearly terrified. After he botches a drum solo, Starr decides this must end before his reputation is ruined and, after escaping from Rrats' house, is arrested by a policewoman for grand theft auto. After two policemen argue over which of his booking photos looks the best, he escapes the police station, runs into Marquine and asks her to lead him to the concert venue.

With Rrats now insisting that he is not Ringo Starr, Marty enlists the help of Dr. Nancy, who puts Rrats into a trance to imagine himself among the music greats, in order to "remember" his identity as "Ringo Starr". We cut back to the press conference, where Harrison tells reporters that the Ringo Starr who will be performing that night is actually Ognir Rrats.

Being brought out of the trance just before the concert, Rrats instead uses it as an opportunity to sell star maps on stage. After he's booed off, the real Ringo Starr arrives backstage and the two meet up again. Reasoning that Rrats is well versed in maps, Starr invites him to be his road manager for the tour before finishing the concert himself.

== Production ==
Written by Neal Israel and Pat Proft, the same duo who would go on to write Police Academy (1984), Bachelor Party (1984) and Real Genius (1985), this film has a well-known all-star cast, including John Ritter, Art Carney, Carrie Fisher, Vincent Price, Angie Dickinson, Mike Douglas and Starr's fellow former Beatles bandmate George Harrison. Harrison, playing himself, is the narrator of the story, and references the Rutles' film All You Need Is Cash. The story is interspersed with musical interludes and ends with a concert. Starr performs songs from the Beatles' repertoire and his solo career, ending with two songs from his most recent album at the time, Bad Boy (1978). The story of the film is loosely based on Mark Twain's novel The Prince and the Pauper (1881).

== Cast ==
- Ringo Starr as Himself/Ognir Rrats
- Art Carney as Ognir's Father
- Angie Dickinson as Sergeant Suzanne "Pepper" Anderson
- Mike Douglas as Himself
- Carrie Fisher as Marquine
- Vincent Price as Dr. Nancy
- John Ritter as Marty Flesh
- George Harrison as Himself
