= Starr Struck: Best of Ringo Starr, Vol. 2 =

Greatest hits album by Ringo Starr
- Released: 24 February 1989
- Recorded: April 1976 – August 1982
- Genre: Rock
- Length: 40:52 (LP); 53:38 (CD)
- Label: Rhino
- Producer: Arif Mardin; Vini Poncia; Ringo Starr; Paul McCartney; George Harrison; Joe Walsh

Ringo Starr chronology
Old Wave (1983)	Starr Struck: Best of Ringo Starr, Vol. 2 (1989)	Ringo Starr and His All-Starr Band (1990)

Professional ratings
Review scores
Source	Rating
AllMusic	3/5 stars
Robert Christgau	C
Encyclopedia of Popular Music	3/5 stars
The Essential Rock Discography	6/10
MusicHound	2.5/5
The Rolling Stone Album Guide	3/5 stars

Starr Struck: Best of Ringo Starr, Vol. 2 is Ringo Starr's second official compilation album, released in the US in 1989.

== Content ==
The successor to 1975's Blast from Your Past, it rounds up Starr's highlights from 1976's Ringo's Rotogravure to 1983's Old Wave and encompasses label stays with Polydor, Atlantic, Portrait, and RCA. Consequently, it saw the first release of four tracks from Old Wave which had not been issued in the US up to that time. The CD edition features four additional tracks that were not present on the vinyl edition: "Attention", "Who Needs a Heart", "Hopeless" and "You Belong to Me". The cover photo was originally for the unreleased version of Stop and Smell the Roses (1981), entitled Can't Fight Lightning.

== Release ==
The album was issued on 24 February 1989 by Rhino, only in the US. (Note: Vinyl: R11G 70135; CD: R12S 70135) Never charting anywhere, Starr Struck: Best of Ringo Starr, Vol. 2 went out of print during the 1990s.

== Track listings ==
=== LP edition ===
Side 1
No.	Title	Original release	Length
1.	"Wrack My Brain" (George Harrison)	Stop and Smell the Roses	2:21
2.	"In My Car" (Richard Starkey/Joe Walsh/Mo Foster/Kim Goody)	Old Wave	3:14
3.	"Cookin' (In the Kitchen of Love)" (John Lennon)	Ringo's Rotogravure	3:42
4.	"I Keep Forgettin'" (Jerry Leiber/Mike Stoller)	Old Wave	4:20
5.	"Hard Times" (Peter Skellern)	Bad Boy	3:33
6.	"Hey Baby" (Margaret Cobb/Bruce Channel)	Ringo's Rotogravure	3:12

Side 2
No.	Title	Original release	Length
1.	"A Dose of Rock 'n' Roll" (Carl Groszmann)	Ringo's Rotogravure	3:26
2.	"Private Property" (Paul McCartney)	Stop and Smell the Roses	2:43
3.	"Can She Do It like She Dances" (Steve Duboff/Gerry Robinson)	Ringo the 4th	3:13
4.	"Heart On My Sleeve" (Benny Gallagher/Graham Lyle)	Bad Boy	3:22
5.	"Sure to Fall (In Love with You)" (Carl Perkins/Quinton Claunch/William Cantrell)	Stop and Smell the Roses	3:44
6.	"She's About a Mover" (Doug Sahm)	Old Wave	3:54

=== CD edition ===
No.	Title	Original release	Length
1.	"Wrack My Brain" (Harrison)	Stop and Smell the Roses	2:21
2.	"In My Car" (Starkey/Walsh/Foster/Goody)	Old Wave	3:14
3.	"Cookin' (In the Kitchen of Love)" (Lennon)	Ringo's Rotogravure	3:42
4.	"I Keep Forgettin'" (Leiber/Stoller)	Old Wave	4:20
5.	"Hard Times" (Peter Skellern)	Bad Boy	3:33
6.	"Hey Baby" (Cobb/Channel)	Ringo's Rotogravure	3:12
7.	"Attention" (McCartney)	Stop and Smell the Roses	3:21
8.	"A Dose of Rock 'n' Roll" (Groszmann)	Ringo's Rotogravure	3:26
9.	"Who Needs a Heart" (Starkey/Poncia)	Bad Boy	3:49
10.	"Private Property" (McCartney)	Stop and Smell the Roses	2:43
11.	"Can She Do It like She Dances" (Duboff/Robinson)	Ringo the 4th	3:13
12.	"Heart on My Sleeve" (Gallagher/Lyle)	Bad Boy	3:22
13.	"Sure to Fall (In Love with You)" (Perkins/Claunch/Cantrell)	Stop and Smell the Roses	3:44
14.	"Hopeless" (Starkey/Walsh)	Old Wave	3:19
15.	"You Belong to Me" (Pee Wee King/Redd Stewart/Chilton Price)	Stop and Smell the Roses	2:10
16.	"She's About a Mover" (Sahm)	Old Wave	3:54
