= (It's All Down to) Goodnight Vienna =

- US picture sleeve

Single by Ringo Starr

from the album Goodnight Vienna
- B-side: "Oo-Wee"
- Released: 2 June 1975 (US only)
- Genre: Rock
- Length: 2:58 (single version)
- Label: Apple Records
- Songwriter: John Lennon
- Producer: Richard Perry

Ringo Starr singles chronology
"Snookeroo" (1975)	"(It's All Down to) Goodnight Vienna" (1975)	"A Dose of Rock 'n' Roll" (1976)

Official audio
- "Goodnight Vienna" on YouTube

"(It's All Down to) Goodnight Vienna" is a song written by John Lennon, and released by Ringo Starr as the opening title track to his 1974 album Goodnight Vienna. A brief reprise (in which Ringo thanks the band and addresses the listener) closes the album. Released as the third single, this version is a medley combination of the two. The single was released in the US on 2 June 1975. (Note: US Apple 1882)

The title song features Lennon on opening count-in and piano, and Billy Preston on clavinet; and the reprise features Lennon's intro, 'OK, with gusto, boys, with gusto!'.

== Composition and Lyrics ==
Written during Lennon's so-called "Lost Weekend" with May Pang, the lyrics depict the pair hanging out with cohorts (including Starr, Harry Nilsson and Keith Moon) in Los Angeles. The term "Goodnight Vienna" is English slang meaning "it's all over", and the slang term "bohunk" is a mildly derogatory term for an immigrant of Bohemian descent.

This was the second of five Lennon songs to be offered for inclusion on Starr's solo albums, (the others being "I'm the Greatest" from Ringo, "Cookin' (in the Kitchen of Love)" from Ringo's Rotogravure, and two unreleased songs intended for Stop and Smell the Roses).

== Personnel ==
- Ringo Starr – lead vocals, drums
- John Lennon – piano
- Klaus Voormann – bass
- Jim Keltner – drums
- Lon Van Eaton – guitar
- Jesse Ed Davis – guitar
- Billy Preston – clavinet
- Carl Fortina – accordion

== Reception ==
Billboard called "(It's All Down to) Goodnight Vienna" a "good, upbeat sing-along type song," saying that the lyrics were "fun" and the instrumentals were "strong." Cash Box called it a "rousing rocker by Mr Lennon, with super rhythm, piano, and . . accordion tracks!" adding that "those lyrics are the best." Record World said that "Recalling his more rock 'n rollin' hits of the past, this John Lennon tune should give Ringo his third straight top 10 from [Goodnight Vienna]."

Billboard also reviewed the B-side of the single, "Oo-Wee", calling it a "strong, rhythm oriented song...with some good horn riffs and an interesting piano solo." Cash Box called "Oo-Wee" "equally strong for programming" as "(It's All Down to) Goodnight Vienna."

== Chart history ==
Chart (1975)	Peak position
U.S. Billboard Hot 100	31
