= When the Morning Comes =

When the Morning Comes may refer to:

- When the Morning Comes (A Great Big World album), 2015
- When the Morning Comes (Marit Larsen album), 2014
- "When the Morning Comes" (song), a 1974 country song by American singer Hoyt Axton
- "When the Morning Comes", a song from Abandoned Luncheonette, a 1973 album by American duo Hall & Oates
- "When the Morning Comes", a 1992 single by British band Love Decade
- "When The Morning Comes," from the album, Kalapana (1975)

== See also ==
- "This Too Shall Pass" (OK Go song), a song by American alternative-rock band OK Go, whose chorus consists of the repeated line "when the morning comes"
- "Then the Morning Comes", a 1999 song by Smash Mouth
- "Gimme Hope Jo'anna", a 1988 song by Eddy Grant, whose chorus features the similar repeated line "gimme hope ... before the morning come"
