= Goodnight Vienna =

Studio album by Ringo Starr
- Released: 15 November 1974
- Recorded: August 1974
- Studios: Sunset Sound, Producer's Workshop, Los Angeles
- Genres: Rock, pop
- Length: 33:40
- Label: Apple
- Producer: Richard Perry

Ringo Starr chronology
Ringo (1973)	Goodnight Vienna (1974)	Blast from Your Past (1975)

Singles from Goodnight Vienna
- 1. "Only You (And You Alone)" Released: 11 November 1974 (US); 15 November 1974 (UK); 2. "No No Song" Released: 27 January 1975 (US only); 3. "Snookeroo" Released: 21 February 1975 (UK only); 4. "(It's All Down to) Goodnight Vienna" Released: 2 June 1975 (US only)

Goodnight Vienna is the fourth studio album by Ringo Starr. It was recorded in the summer of 1974 in Los Angeles, and released on 15 November through Apple Records. Goodnight Vienna followed the commercially successful predecessor Ringo, and Starr used many of the same players, including Billy Preston, Klaus Voormann, Robbie Robertson, Harry Nilsson, and producer Richard Perry.

== Background and recording ==
While all three other former Beatles had contributed to Ringo (1973), only John Lennon contributed to Goodnight Vienna. On 17 June 1974, Starr called Lennon, who was about to record his Walls and Bridges album, and asked him to write a song he could include on his next album. Lennon wrote what became the title track, "(It's All Down to) Goodnight Vienna". (Note: The title was, as Starr commented, "a Northern Expression [...] which means 'I'm getting out of here'.") A demo of "(It's All Down to) Goodnight Vienna" was recorded by Lennon on 28 June, with the session musicians from Walls and Bridges and sent to Starr in advance of the sessions. Besides writing and playing piano on the title track, Lennon suggested Starr cover The Platters' hit "Only You (And You Alone)" playing acoustic guitar and providing a guide vocal for Starr to follow. Starr's versions of both "Only You (And You Alone)" and "(It's All Down to) Goodnight Vienna" were recorded at a session produced by Lennon. (Note: Lennon's versions of "Goodnight Vienna" and "Only You" appear on the 1998 box set John Lennon Anthology.) Elton John also contributed a track, "Snookeroo", co-written with Bernie Taupin. Harry Nilsson gave Starr the track "Easy for Me", which he later recorded his own version of for his Duit on Mon Dei album.

== Release ==
"Only You (And You Alone)", backed with "Call Me", was issued as an advance single from the album in the US on 11 November 1974, before the album was released. (Note: US Apple 1876) In the US the song reached number 6 on the Billboard Hot 100. Goodnight Vienna was released on the same day as the "Only You (And You Alone)" single in the UK on 15 November. (Note: Album: UK Apple PCS 7168; Single: UK Apple R 6000) The album reached only number 30 in the UK, and would be Starr's last chart album in his homeland until 1998. The album was released in the US on 18 November, (Note: US Apple SW-3417) and peaked at number 8, ultimately going gold, and its reviews were generally favourable. It was also originally released in quadrophonic. A promo film for "Only You (And You Alone)" was aired on Top of the Pops on 19 December. On 27 January 1975, "No No Song", backed with "Snookeroo", was released in the US, reaching number 3. (Note: US Apple 1880) Nearly a month later, on 21 February, "Snookeroo" was released as a single in the UK, backed with "Oo-Wee".

On 2 June, a special edit of "(It's All Down to) Goodnight Vienna" and "Goodnight Vienna (Reprise)" was released as a single, backed with an edit of "Oo-Wee", in the US.

A television commercial, which featured a voiceover from Lennon, depicted the album cover's flying saucer (with Starr) over Los Angeles—landing on the roof of the Capitol Records Building in Hollywood. The commercial was produced by Vidtronics Company Inc. and directed by Stanley Dorfman. Starr returned the favour and did the voiceover for the commercial for Lennon's Walls and Bridges album. Immediately after filming the commercial, on 14 November 1974, the promo film for "Only You (And You Alone)" was filmed. During the video Starr and Nilsson mimed to the song, on top of the Capitol Records Building. A lightweight flying saucer and a forty-foot robot named 'Gort' were placed on the building, accompanied by Starr in a spacesuit, and Nilsson sitting in a rocking chair smoking a cigarette in a brown dressing robe, reading that morning's Los Angeles Times, with a front-page photo showing Starr in his space costume. An orange-clad marching band, and forty actors (who formerly played Munchkins in The Wizard of Oz) danced below them at street level. The video aired on BBC TV's Top of the Pops show, on 19 December.

Goodnight Vienna was reissued in the US, this time by Capitol in February 1981. (Note: US Capitol SN-16219) The album was remastered and reissued on CD on 30 November 1992 in the UK, (Note: UK Parlophone CDEMS 1467) and on 23 March 1993 in the US, (Note: US Capitol CDP 7 80378 2) with three bonus tracks: 1972 hit single "Back Off Boogaloo", its B-Side "Blindman" and an extended version of the McCartney-penned "Six O'Clock", a shorter version of which had earlier appeared on the LP version of Ringo.

== Album cover and title ==
The album cover for Goodnight Vienna was based on a still from the classic 1951 science fiction film The Day the Earth Stood Still, with Starr's head replacing that of actor Michael Rennie shown standing behind the robot Gort. Rennie's character was the alien Klaatu.

The title is a slang phrase meaning "it's all over".

== Track listing ==
Professional ratings
Review scores
Source	Rating
AllMusic	4/5 stars
Billboard	(favourable)
Christgau's Record Guide	B−
Encyclopedia of Popular Music	2/5 stars
The Essential Rock Discography	5/10
MusicHound	2/5
Record Collector	4/5 stars
Rolling Stone	(favourable)
The Rolling Stone Album Guide	2/5 stars

Side one

1. "(It's All Down to) Goodnight Vienna" (John Lennon) – 2:35
2. "Occapella" (Allen Toussaint) – 2:55
3. "Oo-Wee" (Vini Poncia, Richard Starkey) – 3:45
4. "Husbands and Wives" (Roger Miller) – 3:34
5. "Snookeroo" (Elton John, Bernie Taupin) – 3:27

Side two

1. "All by Myself" (Poncia, Starkey) – 3:21
2. "Call Me" (Starkey) – 4:07
3. "No No Song" (Hoyt Axton, David Jackson) – 2:33
4. "Only You (And You Alone)" (Buck Ram) – 3:26
5. "Easy for Me" (Harry Nilsson) – 2:20
6. "Goodnight Vienna (Reprise)" (Lennon) – 1:20

1992 bonus tracks

12. "Back Off Boogaloo" (Starkey) – 3:22
13. "Blindman" (Starkey) – 2:46
14. "Six O'Clock (Extended Version)" (Paul McCartney, Linda McCartney) – 5:23

== Personnel ==
- Ringo Starr – lead vocals, drums, percussion
- Jim Keltner – drums
- John Lennon – piano, acoustic guitar, backing vocals
- Carl Fortina – accordion
- Richard Bennett – electric guitar solo
- Dennis Coffey – guitar
- Steve Cropper – electric guitar
- Jesse Ed Davis – electric guitar
- Vini Poncia – acoustic guitar, backing vocals
- Robbie Robertson – guitar
- Alvin Robinson – guitar
- Lon Van Eaton – guitar
- Klaus Voormann – bass guitar
- Richard Perry – bass guitar, backing vocals
- Dr. John – piano, backing vocals
- Elton John – piano
- David Foster – piano
- Tom Hensley – electric piano
- Nicky Hopkins – electric piano
- Lincoln Mayorga – piano
- Billy Preston – electric piano, clavinet
- James Newton Howard – synthesizer
- Gary Wright – keyboards
- Chuck Findley – horns
- Bobby Keys – horns
- Trevor Lawrence – horns
- Lew McCreary – horns
- Steve Madaio – trumpet
- Madeline Bell – backing vocals
- Lesley Duncan – backing vocals
- Jean Gilbert – backing vocals
- Jimmy Gilstrap – backing vocals
- Joe Greene – backing vocals
- Ira Hawkins – backing vocals
- Clydie King – backing vocals
- Lynda Laurence – backing vocals
- Harry Nilsson – backing vocals
- May Pang – backing vocals
- Masst Alberts – backing vocals
- Derrek Van Eaton – backing vocals
- Cynthia Webb – backing vocals

== Charts ==
=== Weekly charts ===
Chart (1974–75)	Peak position
Australian Albums (Kent Music Report)	11
Austrian Albums (Ö3 Austria)	8
Canada Top Albums/CDs (RPM)	14
Danish Albums (Hitlisten)	5
Finnish Albums (The Official Finnish Charts)	28
German Albums (Offizielle Top 100)	39
Italian Albums (Musica e Dischi)	12
Japanese Albums (Oricon)	53
Norwegian Albums (VG-lista)	15
UK Albums (Official Charts)	30
US Billboard 200	8

=== Year-end charts ===
Chart (1975)	Peak position
Australian Albums (Kent Music Report)	80
Canada Top Albums/CDs (RPM)	68
US Billboard 200	61

== Certifications ==
Region	Certification	Certified units/sales
United Kingdom (BPI)	Silver	60,000^{^}
United States (RIAA)	Gold	500,000^{^}
^{^} Shipments figures based on certification alone.
