= Wings (Ringo Starr song) =

1977 single by Ringo Starr

- A-side label

Single by Ringo Starr

from the album Ringo the 4th
- B-side: "Just a Dream"
- Released: 25 August 1977
- Genre: Rock
- Length: 3:26 (album version); 3:03 (single version)
- Label: Atlantic
- Songwriters: Richard Starkey; Vince Poncia
- Producer: Arif Mardin

Ringo Starr singles chronology
"Las Brisas" (1976)	"Wings" (1977)	"Drowning in the Sea of Love" (1977)

"Wings"
- Download cover

Single by Ringo Starr

from the album Ringo 2012
- Released: 10 January 2012
- Genre: Reggae rock
- Length: 3:31
- Label: Hip-O
- Songwriters: Richard Starkey; Vince Poncia
- Producers: Ringo Starr; Bruce Sugar

Ringo Starr singles chronology
"Walk with You" (2009)	"Wings" (2012)	"Postcards from Paradise" (2015)

Music video
- "Wings" (2012) on YouTube

"Wings" is a song by English musician Ringo Starr, originally recorded for and released as a single from the album Ringo the 4th. It was co-written with Vini Poncia in 1977. Starr later re-recorded it, produced by Starr and Bruce Sugar, and released it as a single from his 2012 studio album, Ringo 2012.

== Recording ==
Starr on the 2012 re-recording of "Wings" was for Ringo 2012:

"This is a song I first recorded on Ringo the 4th back when an album meant vinyl. These are different days, and it's one of those songs I always wanted to revisit. I wrote 'Wings' with Vinnie Poncia in New York, and he doesn't know I've done this yet. I'm going to surprise Vinnie and send it to him...For the last two years, I've been listening to a lot of reggae, so this album has a reggae feel to it. What can I tell you? I'm a product of my environment. I always loved the sentiment of this song, and I'm glad we finally got it right."

== Release ==
The original version was released as a single in the US on 26 August 1977, backed with non-album track "Just a Dream". (Note: US Atlantic 3429)

A live version by Ringo Starr & His All-Starr Band, recorded live in Atlanta, was released on the Hurricane Sandy charity compilation Songs After Sandy: Friends of Red Hook for Sandy Relief.

Starr gave filmmakers the chance to do an official promo video for 2012 version of "Wings"; the winning video was chosen by Starr himself. Starr called it "a great little video".

== Reception ==
Cash Box said that "the haunting melody is carried by a closely-knit ensemble of vocalists, and supported by a richly-textured horn section and stabbing guitars." In a review for Ultimate Classic Rock, Billy Dukes calls the remake "less passionate, borderline lifeless vocal performance" when compared to the original.

== Personnel ==
Ringo the 4th version

- Ringo Starr – lead vocals, drums
- David Spinozza – lead guitar
- Jeff Mironov or John Tropea – guitars
- Don Grolnick – keyboards
- Tony Levin – bass
- Steve Gadd – drums

Ringo 2012 version

- Ringo Starr – drums, percussion, vocals, keyboards, backing vocals
- Joe Walsh – guitar
- Benmont Tench – organ
- Bruce Sugar – piano, horn arrangement
- Amy Keys – backing vocals
- Kelly Moneymaker – backing vocals
