= Southbound (Hoyt Axton album) =

Studio album by Hoyt Axton
- Released: 1975
- Genre: Country
- Label: A&M
- Producer: Hoyt Axton & Henry Lewy

Hoyt Axton chronology
Life Machine (1974)	Southbound (1975)	Fearless (1976)

Professional ratings
Review scores
Source	Rating
AllMusic	2.5/5 stars
The Encyclopedia of Popular Music	2/5 stars
The Rolling Stone Album Guide	3/5 stars

Southbound is an album by folk-rock writer & country singer Hoyt Axton. It was released in 1975. It reached #27 on the US country charts and #188 on the Billboard 200.

== Track listing ==
Side 1

1. "I Love to Sing" (Bob Lind) – 2:00
2. "Southbound" (Hoyt Axton, Mark Dawson) – 2:27
3. "Lion in Winter" (Hoyt Axton) – 3:20
4. "Blind Fiddler" (Traditional; arranged by Hoyt Axton) – 2:25
5. "Pride of Man" (Hoyt Axton, David P. Jackson) – 3:15
6. "Greensleeves" (Traditional; arranged by Hoyt Axton) – 3:45
7. "No No Song" (Hoyt Axton, David P. Jackson) – 2:39

Side 2

1. "Nashville" (Hoyt Axton) – 3:35
2. "Speed Trap (Out of State Cars)" (Hoyt Axton) – 2:25
3. "Roll Your Own" (Mel McDaniel) – 2:08
4. "Whiskey" (Hoyt Axton) – 2:12
5. "In a Young Girl's Mind" (Hoyt Axton, Mark Dawson) – 3:25
6. "Sometimes It's Easy" (Hoyt Axton) – 1:58

== Personnel ==
- Mike Botts, John Guerin - drums
- Jerry Scheff, Emory Gordy, Max Bennett, Joe Lamanto - bass guitar
- George Clinton, David Jackson - piano
- Marty Howard, Dick Rosmini, Hoyt Axton, Jeff Baxter, Mark Dawson, Frank Rekard - acoustic guitar
- Jeff Baxter, James Burton, Roger Johnson - electric guitar
- Jeff Baxter - dobro, steel guitar
- John Hartford - fiddle
- Doug Dillard - banjo
- Mark Dawson - harmonica
- Roger Johnson - autoharp
- Victor Feldman - marimba
- Jerry Scheff - tuba
- Dick Hyde - trombone
- Johnny Rotella - clarinet, recorder
- Gail Davies - tambourine
- David Jackson - electric piano
- Gustavo Ramos, Francisco Arellano - mariachi trumpets
- Paul Lewinson - celeste
- Cheech & Chong - "attempted temptation"
- Linda Ronstadt - duet on "Lion in Winter"

=== Horns ===
- Johnny Rotella
- Jerome Richardson
- Jay Migliori
- Dick Hyde
- Ollie Mitchell

=== Featured background singers ===
- Renee Armand
- Judy Elliott
- Lee Montgomery
- Mark Dawson

=== Street singers ===
- Jana Ballan, Guthrie Thomas, James Scott, Dennis Brooks, Ronee Blakley, Dana Brady, Bob Lind, William Farmer, Sharon Mack, Joan and Alexander Sliwin, Jules Alexander, Carol Payne, Valerie Carter, Wendy Webb, Mark Keller, Linda Chandler, Gail Davies, David Hasselhoff, David Stafford, Tom Jans, Bryon Walls, David P. Jackson, Jan-Michael Vincent, John T. Axton & Cindy Shubin

== Production ==
- Produced by Hoyt Axton and Henry Lewy
- Arranged by Paul Lewinson
- Sound engineer – Henry Lewy assisted by Ellis Sorkin and John L. Sisti
- Recorded at A&M Recording Studios, Hollywood, California
- Album photos – Suzanne Ayres
- Album design – Chuck Beeson
- Liner design – Rod Dyer
