= No No Song =

- A-side label

Single by Ringo Starr

from the album Goodnight Vienna
- B-side: "Snookeroo"
- Released: 27 January 1975 (US only)
- Recorded: 1974
- Genre: Pop, novelty
- Length: 2:33
- Label: Apple Records
- Songwriters: Hoyt Axton, David Jackson
- Producer: Richard Perry

Ringo Starr singles chronology
"Only You (And You Alone)" (1974)	"No No Song" (1975)	"Snookeroo" (1975)

"No No Song" is a 1974 song by English musician Ringo Starr. Written by Hoyt Axton and David Jackson, it appeared on Starr's 1974 album, Goodnight Vienna. It was released as a single in the US on 27 January 1975, backed with "Snookeroo," (Note: US Apple 1880) and reached No. 1 in Canada, #3 in the Billboard charts, becoming his 7th and last top 10 hit. It also reached No. 1 on Cash Box charts in the US.

In the song, the narrator meets a woman from Colombia who offers him marijuana; a woman from Mallorca, Spain, who offers him cocaine; and a man from Nashville, Tennessee, who offers him moonshine whiskey. The narrator declines all of them, saying that they are bad for his health. Harry Nilsson provides backing vocals.

Some reissues and later pressings of the Ringo Starr version credit the song as "No No Song/Skokiaan." As Keith Harris and Chuck Eddy wrote in Rolling Stone, "The music's real root, though, is apparently the Rhodesian number 'Skokiaan,' (first recorded in 1947), the title of which actually gets affixed to certain pressings of Ringo's records."

== Personnel ==
Personnel are taken from the LP liner notes.

- Ringo Starr – drums, percussion, vocals
- Klaus Voormann – bass
- Harry Nilsson – backing vocals
- Jesse Ed Davis – electric guitar
- Nicky Hopkins – electric piano
- Bobby Keys – horns
- Trevor Lawrence – horns
- Keith Moon – spoken voice

== Reception ==
Billboard described "No No Song" as a "good, fun Ringo cut." Billboard expressed concern that the drug references might limit airplay, even though the lyrics have the singer rejecting drug use. Cash Box described it as a "friendly, tongue-in-cheek temperance tune," saying that "Ringo delivers it like he really means it!!"

== Covers ==
In 1975, the song's co-writer, Hoyt Axton, released his own version of the song, featuring Cheech and Chong, on his album Southbound.

That same year, Joe Dassin released a French language adaptation of the song, "Moi j'ai dit non" ("Me, I Said No"), as the B-side of his most successful single, "L'Été indien". In this version, the protagonist refuses money, a marriage proposal and a political office in order to preserve his peace of mind. Another French version, "(Non non non non) Je suis un mari fidèle" ("I'm a Faithful Husband"), was also released in 1975 by Robert Demontigny for the Québec market in Canada. This time, the protagonist refuses various women's advances but changes his mind in the end when he finds his wife kissing his best friend.

Brazilian rock musician Raul Seixas recorded a Brazilian Portuguese version called "Não Quero Mais Andar na Contramão" ("Don't Want to Ride on the Wrong Way Anymore"), adapting the drugs mentioned in the lyrics to the Brazilian culture (respectively, Colombian marijuana, Bolivian cocaine and Argentinian chloroethane spray). This version was included on his 1988 album A Pedra do Gênesis ("The Genesis's Stone") and issued as a promotional single.

== Charts ==
=== Weekly charts ===
Chart (1975)	Peak position
Canada Top Singles (RPM)	1
US Billboard Hot 100	3
US Cash Box Top 100	1

=== Year-end charts ===
Chart (1975)	Rank
Canada (RPM)	26
US Billboard Hot 100	87
US Cash Box Top 100	73
