= Wrack My Brain =

- US single picture sleeve

Single by Ringo Starr

from the album Stop and Smell the Roses
- B-side: "Drumming is My Madness"
- Released: 27 October 1981
- Genre: Pop
- Length: 2:21
- Label: RCA (US) Boardwalk (UK)
- Songwriter: George Harrison
- Producer: George Harrison

Ringo Starr singles chronology
"Tonight" (1978)	"Wrack My Brain" (1981)	"Private Property" (1981)

Music video
- "Wrack My Brain" on YouTube

"Wrack My Brain" is a song by the English musician Ringo Starr as the lead single from his 1981 album Stop and Smell the Roses, written and produced by former Beatle George Harrison.

The song became Starr's final Top 40 hit of his career, as well as his last single to chart on the Billboard Hot 100.

== Background ==
"Wrack My Brain" was written by George Harrison to explain his frustration with the music industry and the pressure to produce hits.

In the liner notes of Photograph: The Very Best of Ringo Starr, Starr wrote the following about the song:

George wrote that one. I was watching a lot of TV then, as he writes in one of the lyrics of the song. Also I was probably going insane too. George thought this song would be good for me. It's a song I know he'd never do. So it gave George more freedom and it was a bit looser than something that he would do for himself.

— Ringo Starr, in David Wild, Photograph: The Very Best of Ringo Starr,

== Reception ==
Billboard called it a "short, catchy pop tune" and stating that "This is Ringo's most instantaneously memorable tune in some time." Record World stated that you "can't help but love Ringo here, as he sings of a stifled romance on this initial single from his new LP."

== Release history ==
The song has been released on Starr Struck: Best of Ringo Starr, Vol. 2 and Photograph: The Very Best of Ringo Starr.

== Personnel ==
According to author Simon Leng, except where noted:

- Ringo Starr – drums, vocal
- George Harrison – guitars, backing vocal
- Herbie Flowers – bass, tuba
- Ray Cooper – piano, percussion, vocoder, backing vocal
- Al Kooper – piano, electric guitar

== Charts ==
Chart (1981)	Peak position
Belgium (Ultratop 50 Flanders)	32
Switzerland (Schweizer Hitparade)	10
US Billboard Hot 100	38
