= Postcards from Paradise =

Studio album by Ringo Starr
- Released: 31 March 2015
- Recorded: 2014–15
- Studios: Roccabella West, Los Angeles; Rydinghurst, UK
- Genre: Rock
- Length: 43:57
- Labels: UM^{e}, Universal Music Group International
- Producer: Ringo Starr

Ringo Starr chronology
Ringo 2012 (2012)	Postcards from Paradise (2015)	Give More Love (2017)

Singles from Postcards from Paradise
- 1. "Postcards from Paradise" Released: 3 March 2015

Postcards from Paradise is the eighteenth studio album by English singer-songwriter Ringo Starr. It was released on 31 March 2015.

== Development ==
The album was produced completely by Starr himself, and engineered by longtime collaborator Bruce Sugar. Several album titles were considered, including "Let Love Lead". Starr worked with many of his regular songwriting and recording colleagues on Postcards from Paradise, including Van Dyke Parks, Dave Stewart, and Gary Burr. As with his previous albums, Starr maintains a philosophy of "If you show up at my house and you can play, you're on the record". The song "Island in the Sun" is notable as being the first studio recording that was co-written and recorded by every member of Starr's current All-Starr Band.

Rock photographer Rob Shanahan took the cover photograph, which was developed further by Universal Music Group, Starr's record label. The label added a grey scalloped border in the manner of a postage stamp.

== Promotion and release ==
Starr first revealed the album's title through a Twitter post in January 2015. Three tracks, "Postcards from Paradise", "Right Side of the Road" and "Not Looking Back", became available for purchase in early March 2015. A lyric video for "Postcards from Paradise" was released on 5 March via Yahoo.com. "Confirmation", "Bamboula" and "Touch and Go" were released during the week preceding the album's release. The album was issued a few weeks before Starr's second induction into the Rock and Roll Hall of Fame.

== Reception ==
Professional ratings
Aggregate scores
Source	Rating
Metacritic	61/100
Review scores
Source	Rating
AllMusic	4/5 stars
Blogcritics	3/5 stars
Classic Rock	5/10
PopMatters	6/10 stars
Q	3/5 stars
Record Collector	1/5 stars
Rolling Stone	3/5 stars
Slant Magazine	2/5 stars

== Track listing ==
No.	Title	Writer(s)	Length
1.	"Rory and the Hurricanes"	Richard Starkey; Dave Stewart	4:09
2.	"You Bring the Party Down"	Starkey; Steve Lukather	3:41
3.	"Bridges"	Starkey; Joe Walsh	5:01
4.	"Postcards from Paradise"	Starkey; Todd Rundgren	5:18
5.	"Right Side of the Road"	Starkey; Richard Marx	3:12
6.	"Not Looking Back"	Starkey; Marx	3:50
7.	"Bamboula"	Starkey; Van Dyke Parks	3:20
8.	"Island in the Sun" (featuring the All Starr Band)	Starkey; Rundgren; Richard Page; Lukather; Gregg Rolie; Warren Ham; Gregg Bissonette	4:02
9.	"Touch and Go"	Starkey; Gary Burr	3:36
10.	"Confirmation"	Starkey; Glen Ballard	3:37
11.	"Let Love Lead"	Starkey; Gary Nicholson	4:11

== Personnel ==
Personnel per booklet.

Musicians

- Ringo Starr – lead and backing vocals, drums, percussion, keyboards (3, 4), reggae guitar (5), piano (11), string arrangement
- David A. Stewart – guitar (1, 6)
- Steve Lukather – guitar (8), synth bass (2), backing vocals (2, 8)
- Joe Walsh – guitar (3, 6)
- Peter Frampton – guitar (5, 11)
- Richard Marx – backing vocals, guitar (6)
- Steve Dudas – guitar (9, 10)
- Gary Nicholson – guitar (11)
- Michael Bradford – bass guitar (1)
- Nathan East – bass guitar (6, 9, 10, 11)
- Richard Page – backing vocals, bass guitar (8)
- Ann-Marie Simpson – violin, string arrangement
- Jason Borger – keyboards (1)
- Bruce Sugar – sitar synth (2), keyboards, piano (4), synth (4), synth bass (5), string arrangement, synth strings (6)
- Van Dyke Parks – piano, accordion, synth (7), horn arrangement
- Benmont Tench – organ (5, 9), piano (6)
- Gregg Rolie – organ (8)
- Glen Ballard – piano (10)
- Warren Ham – saxophone, keyboards, backing vocals (8)
- Lee Thornburg – trombone (7), trumpet & trombone (10)
- Jimmy Z – harmonica (9), saxophone (10)
- Gregg Bissonette – percussion, trumpet, steel drums, backing vocals (8)
- Double Treble – backing vocals (1)
- Amy Keys – backing vocals
- Kari Kimmel – backing vocals
- Todd Rundgren – backing vocals (4)
- Windy Wagner – backing vocals

Production

- Ringo Starr – producer, mixing
- Bruce Sugar – recording, mixing, keyboard programming
- Chris Bellman – mastering
- Ned Douglas – additional engineer
- Sean Rolie – B3 organ engineering
- Vartan – art direction
- Masaki, Meire Murakani – design
- Rob Shanahan – cover photo
- Scott Ritchie – back cover photo

== Charts ==
Chart (2015)	Peak position
Belgian Albums (Ultratop Flanders)	146
Belgian Albums (Ultratop Wallonia)	114
Dutch Albums (Album Top 100)	95
Italian Albums (FIMI)	91
Japanese Albums (Oricon)	110
Spanish Albums (Promusicae)	88
US Billboard 200	99
US Top Rock Albums (Billboard)	21
US Indie Store Album Sales (Billboard)	15
