= I'll Still Love You =

Song by Ringo Starr

from the album Ringo's Rotogravure
- Published: 1972 (as "When Every Song Is Sung")
- Released: 17 September 1976
- Studio: Cherokee, Los Angeles
- Genre: Rock
- Length: 2:57
- Label: Polydor (UK)/Atlantic (US)
- Songwriter: George Harrison
- Producer: Arif Mardin

"I'll Still Love You" is a song written by the English rock musician George Harrison and first released in 1976 by his former Beatles bandmate Ringo Starr. Produced by Arif Mardin, the track appeared on Starr's debut album for Atlantic Records and Polydor, Ringo's Rotogravure. The composition had a long recording history before then, having been written in 1970 as "Whenever", after which it was copyrighted with the title "When Every Song Is Sung".

Harrison originally intended the song for Welsh singer Shirley Bassey, who had a hit in the summer of 1970 with a cover version of his Beatles composition "Something". Although Harrison recorded "When Every Song Is Sung" himself during the sessions for All Things Must Pass that year, it was not included on his album. He went on to produce recordings of the track by former Ronette Ronnie Spector in February 1971, and Cilla Black in August 1972, but neither version was completed for release. Mary Hopkin and Leon and Mary Russell also attempted the song during the first half of the 1970s, with Harrison participating in the Russells' recording. A later version by Black – produced by David Mackay and titled "I'll Still Love You (When Every Song Is Sung)" – appeared on her 2003 compilation Cilla: The Best of 1963–78.

Together with John Lennon and Paul McCartney's respective contributions, the song's inclusion on Rotogravure marked the second occasion when Starr's former bandmates had each supplied a song for one of his albums, after Ringo in 1973. While Starr's rendition is often held in low regard, some commentators consider "I'll Still Love You" to be one of Harrison's finest love songs and on a par with "Something". Author Ian Inglis describes the song as "an unfinished masterpiece".

== Background and composition ==
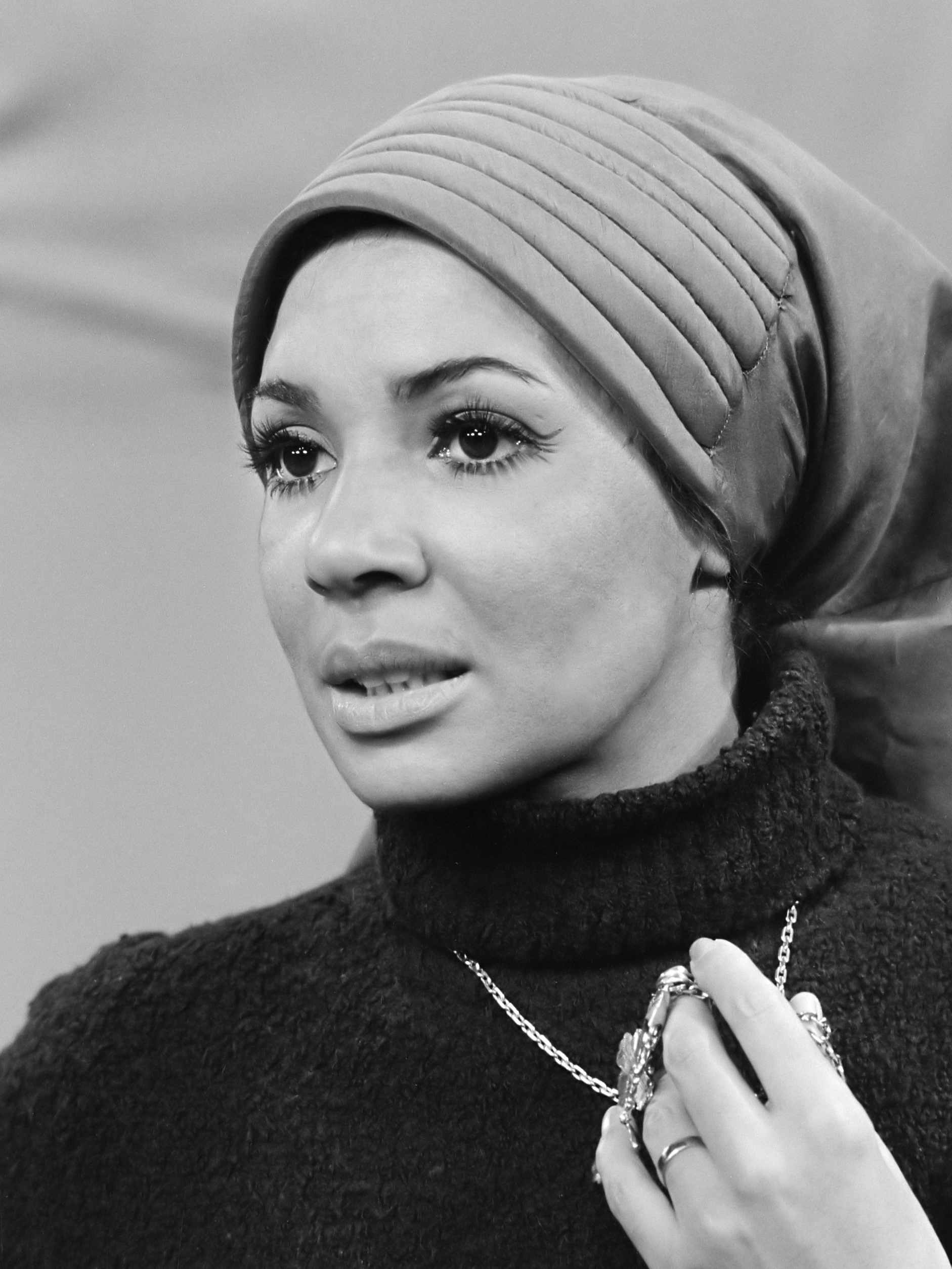
Singer Shirley Bassey, pictured in January 1971

In late 1969, George Harrison's song "Something" was issued on the A-side of a single by the Beatles – the first time that one of his compositions had been given that honour. Discussing the song, Harrison remarked in an interview: "There's a lot of songs like that in my head. I must get them down. Maybe even other people would like to sing them." In the summer of 1970, "Something" gave Welsh singer Shirley Bassey her biggest UK hit in nine years, an achievement that led her to tell the press that she and Harrison could become a singer-and-songwriter pairing on the scale of Dionne Warwick and Burt Bacharach. Although he would later be dismissive of Bassey's version of "Something", (Note: In a 1987 interview with Mark Ellen of Q, he said, "but we won't talk about that", referring to Bassey's cover.) Harrison wrote a new song for her to record after reading these comments. Originally titled "Whenever", it became "When Every Song Is Sung" and later "I'll Still Love You".

When I wrote "When Every Song Is Sung" I had it titled "Whenever" ... I thought this would be a good one for [Shirley Bassey].

— George Harrison, 1979

As he had with "Something", Harrison composed the melody on a piano, part-way through a recording session – in this case, while working on his first post-Beatles solo album, All Things Must Pass (1970). As reproduced in his 1980 autobiography, I, Me, Mine, Harrison's original lyrics carried the title "WHENEVER (by Shirley Bassey)". He recalls in the book: "I got the chord sequence, and 'When every song is sung' were the first words to come out of my mouth, and it developed from there." (Note: In I, Me, Mine, Harrison refers to the composition as "When Every Song Is Sung", and that title similarly appears above the completed song lyrics, rather than "I'll Still Love You". "When Every Song Is Sung" is also the title given with the song's publishing details, which list a 1972 Harrisongs copyright.)

Harrison's musical biographer, Simon Leng, considers it to be an "emotionally complex lyric that ponders how love will even survive, 'when every soul is free'". Christian theologian Dale Allison interprets the subject matter of the song as moksha, or liberation from rebirth, in the Hindu faith. He writes: "'I'll Still Love You (When Every Song Is Sung)' looks forward to the time when all souls are 'free,' when all eyes will 'see,' and when all human beings will be of the same mind. 'All Things Must Pass,' but no one really ever passes away."

Author Robert Rodriguez describes the musical tone as that of a "moody torch song". Leng notes that the verses have the same descending semitone pattern as "Something" and, structurally, it features a middle eight that is "harsher" and "dramatic" compared to the verses, just like the middle eight in Harrison's 1969 composition.

== Pre-Ringo's Rotogravure recording history ==
It was one of those [songs] that I tried several times to record: Ronnie Spector, Phil's wife, had a go at it; Cilla Black also ... We also did it with Leon Russell and his wife Mary, and in the end Ringo recorded it.

— George Harrison, 1979

=== George Harrison ===
Still using the title "Whenever", Harrison recorded "When Every Song Is Sung" for All Things Must Pass in 1970 but did not include it on the album. The sessions took place between late May and August that year, at London's Abbey Road and Trident studios. According to bootlegs subsequently compiled from the sessions, 44 takes of the song were taped. The recordings reveal a musical arrangement featuring acoustic guitars, piano, bass, drums and jazz-inflected horns.

Along with other unreleased material from the All Things Must Pass sessions, Harrison's "When Every Song Is Sung" became available in the 1990s on unofficial outtake compilations such as Songs for Patti, some of which list the track as "I'll Still Love You". The available take is missing the start of the performance and its lyrics appear to be incomplete. AllMusic critic Richie Unterberger describes this early version of the song as "haunting" and "a noteworthy find" among outtakes from Harrison's 1970 triple album.

=== Ronnie Spector ===
"When Every Song Is Sung" was one of up to six Harrison compositions recorded in February 1971 for what was intended to be a debut solo album by Ronnie Spector. The latter was the former lead singer of the Ronettes and the wife of Harrison's All Things Must Pass co-producer, Phil Spector. As in 1970, Harrison and Spector co-produced the sessions.

Basic tracks for this and the other songs were taped at Abbey Road Studios with some of the musicians who had played on All Things Must Pass – including Jim Gordon, Klaus Voormann and Gary Wright – along with Leon Russell on piano. The recording was not completed, however, since Phil Spector's erratic behaviour led to the project being abandoned. Issued on Apple Records in April 1971, the single "Try Some, Buy Some" was the only official Ronnie Spector release from these sessions.

=== Cilla Black ===
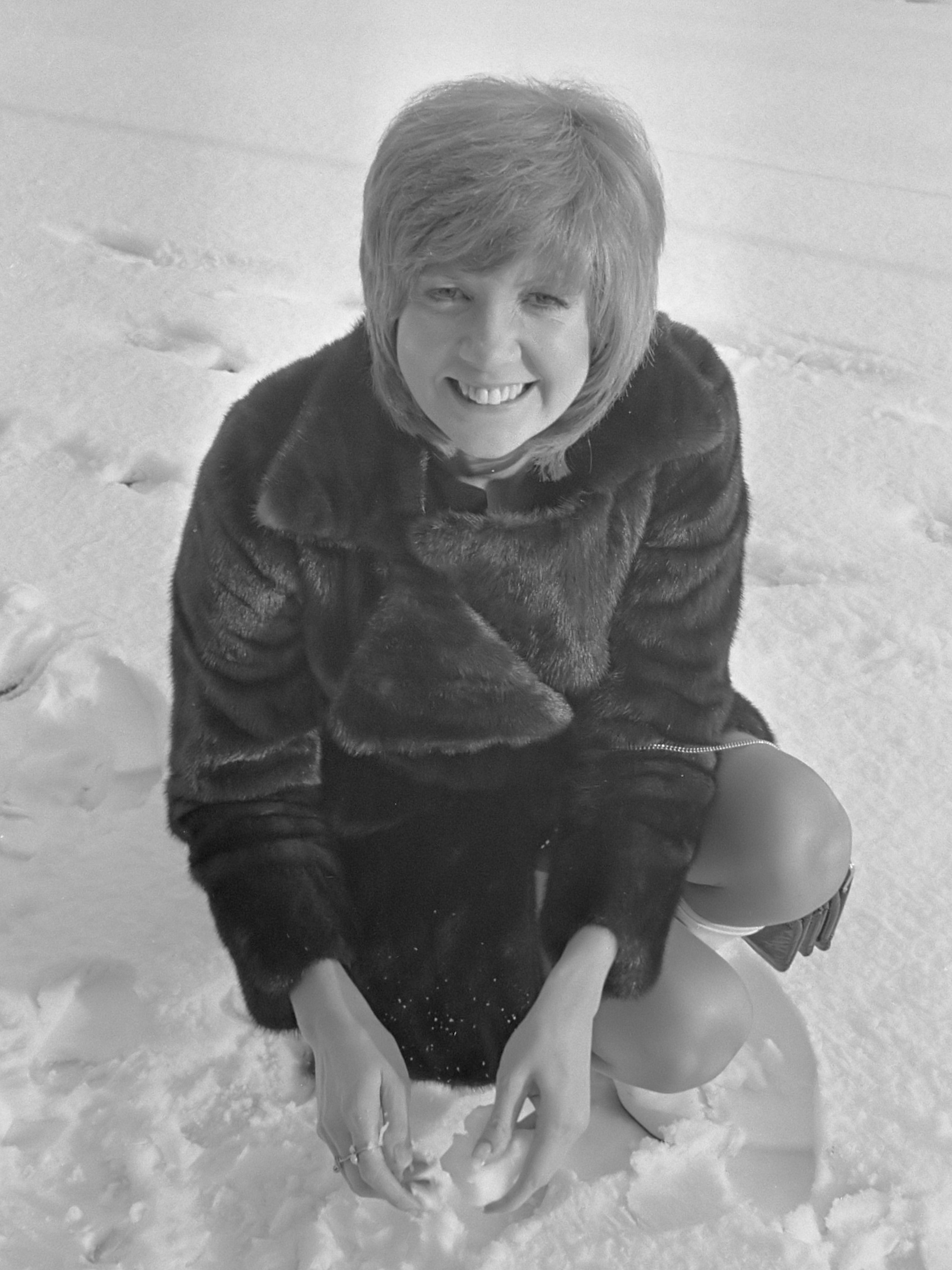
Cilla Black, pictured in 1970

Due to his commitment to the Bangladesh relief effort, Harrison's music-making was limited for much of 1971 and the following year. In early August 1972, shortly after the UK release of the Concert for Bangladesh film, he resumed his role as a record producer with a session for a new Cilla Black single, the A-side of which was to be "When Every Song Is Sung". The recording took place at Apple Studio in London, during Black's day off from her summer variety season in Blackpool. Among the support musicians were Voormann, Ringo Starr and Eric Clapton.

I came down on the Sunday and we all went into Apple studios. There was Ringo on drums, George was producing the thing, Klaus Voormann was on bass, there were also two incredible guitarists – probably Eric Clapton or someone like that. Anyway we did this track and it was really nice ... [Then] we went our separate ways as it were. I never heard anything more about it.

— Cilla Black, 2003

A second Harrison composition, "You Got to Stay With Me", was also attempted at the session, but as with the Ronnie Spector solo album, the project was not completed. Black told radio presenter Spencer Leigh that her ability to record that day was hindered by her discomfort following a dental appointment just before the session began. The B-side that Harrison started writing for her similarly took an alternative route, ending up as the autobiographical "The Light That Has Lighted the World", which he chose to include on his 1973 album Living in the Material World.

According to author Alan Clayson, former Apple artist Mary Hopkin also recorded a version of "When Every Song Is Sung" during this period. Black told Leigh that she still thought the song was "super", and so re-recorded it over 1974–75, this time with producer David Mackay. She said of this later recording: "even then, [the song] didn't have the magic it deserved. It should have had a 'Yesterday'-type arrangement."

In his book The Beatles Diary Volume 2, Keith Badman writes that Harrison and Black met in a London restaurant over Christmas in 1982 and discussed completing their recordings from ten years before. Black's Mackay-produced version of the song was eventually released in May 2003, as "I'll Still Love You (When Every Song Is Sung)", on her three-CD compilation Cilla: The Best of 1963–78.

=== Leon and Mary Russell ===
After their various projects together between 1969 and 1971, including the Concert for Bangladesh, Harrison renewed his musical association with Leon Russell in 1975, while recording Extra Texture in Los Angeles. Aside from contributing to that album, Russell made a new recording of "When Every Song Is Song" with his wife Mary – formerly Mary McCreary of the vocal group Little Sister, and subsequently a solo artist signed to Russell's Shelter record label. The couple married in June 1975, after which they began recording the first of their two albums together, titled Wedding Album.

Harrison participated in the session for "When Every Song Is Sung". According to Tom Petty, who was a Shelter artist at the time, recording took place at Russell's home studio in Encino, with Ringo Starr also at the session. As before, this attempt failed to produce a finished recording of the song. (Note: Harrison also contributed to another Shelter Records project around this time, Cross Winds by Larry Hosford.)

== Ringo's Rotogravure recording ==
["I'll Still Love You"] was an old song of George's. I remembered the song from 1970 ... I always loved it and no one ever did it.

— Ringo Starr, 1976

Starr was another admirer of the song, describing it in an NME interview as "a big ballady thing" and a track "I've always loved". In April 1976, John Lennon and Paul McCartney had each agreed to donate a song and participate in the sessions for Ringo's Rotogravure, Starr's first album on Atlantic Records and Polydor. (Note: Following the expiration of his contract with Apple's distributor, EMI, Starr signed with Atlantic for the North American market, and Polydor for all other territories.) While he had been Starr's most frequent collaborator out of all of Starr's former bandmates after the Beatles' break-up, Harrison was unable to attend the sessions, since he was under pressure to deliver his first Dark Horse Records album, after being waylaid by hepatitis. Starr instead received his permission to record "When Every Song Is Sung", now titled "I'll Still Love You". (Note: Harrison suggested that Starr should also cover "I Don't Want to Do It", an unreleased Bob Dylan song that Harrison had considered recording for All Things Must Pass.) Ringo's Rotogravure thereby became the second album by an ex-Beatle, after Starr's Ringo in 1973, to feature compositions by all four former members of the band.

The Rotogravure sessions took place between April and July 1976, mostly at Cherokee Studios in Los Angeles. Arif Mardin produced the album, since Richard Perry, Starr's usual producer, was committed to another project. The musicians on "I'll Still Love You" included pianist Jane Getz and a rhythm section comprising Starr and Jim Keltner (both on drums) and Voormann (on bass). Lon Van Eaton, a former Apple Records signing, played lead guitar on the track.

As further contributions to a recording that Rodriguez describes as a "dramatic ballad", Mardin added a string synthesizer part, played on an ARP String Ensemble, and Gene Orloff arranged and conducted orchestral strings. Mardin recorded these overdubs at Atlantic Studios in New York, without Starr. According to Keith Badman, Harrison was "not pleased" with Starr's version of the song and took legal action against him, which was soon settled out of court. (Note: When appearing together on ITV's Aspel & Company in March 1988 – the first major television interview to feature two ex-Beatles – Harrison and Starr made light of the issue. In Starr's recollection, Harrison "didn't like the mix … So I said 'Sue me if you want but I'll always love you.'")

== Release and reception ==
Ringo's Rotogravure was issued on 17 September 1976 in Britain and ten days later in the United States, with "I'll Still Love You" sequenced as the second track on side two of the LP. The US release coincided with heightened speculation regarding the possibility of a Beatles reunion, following promoter Sid Bernstein's offer of $230 million for a single concert by the group. While Starr was often asked about his former bandmates' contributions to the album, he was frustrated by the media's preference for discussing the Beatles. (Note: Adding to the Beatles theme, the back cover of Rotogravure featured a photograph of the graffiti-covered door of the former Apple Records offices, following the company's official closure in January 1976.) Starr also dismissed the idea that Harrison's non-appearance on "I'll Still Love You" was to avoid Rotogravure being seen as a work by "The New Beatles'", as one interviewer had suggested. Although it was not selected for release as a single, Starr made a promotional film for the song, along with two other tracks from the album. The film clip, which was rarely seen at the time, shows Starr and a woman dancing together in a park in Hamburg.

As with its parent album, "I'll Still Love You" received a mixed response from music critics. In one of the more favourable reviews, Ray Coleman of Melody Maker admired Rotogravure as "a pleasing album of uncomplicated pop music" and added that the song was "simplicity itself", likening it to "Something". Less impressed, Bob Woffinden of the NME said: "'I'll Still Love You' is a song Harrison wrote some years back. Lyrics are dreadful, but the melody's quite pretty." In his 1977 book The Beatles Forever, Nicholas Schaffner described the contributions from Starr's former bandmates as "sound[ing] more like throwaways", in contrast with their "inspired work" on Ringo. Schaffner lamented that the treatment of "I'll Still Love You" was almost a "Harrison parody", complete with Van Eaton's "fluid imitation" of the guitarist's playing style.

Writing more recently, Robert Rodriguez describes "I'll Still Love You" as one of the highlights of Ringo's Rotogravure, and evidence that "when it came to George, Ringo was the recipient of his strongest giveaways". (Note: Harrison's writing contributions on Ringo included "Photograph", while over 1971–72 he produced and co-wrote two other hit singles by Starr, "It Don't Come Easy" and "Back Off Boogaloo".) In his book on Harrison, for the Praeger Singer-Songwriter Collection, Ian Inglis writes dismissively of Starr's "boisterous shouts" of "Yes I will" and finds Mardin's production similarly unsuitable. Inglis laments that Harrison never revisited the song himself, adding: "It has the potential, lyrically and musically, to become one of his loveliest creations. As it stands, it is an unfinished masterpiece." In Simon Leng's estimation, "When Every Song Is Sung" is among Harrison's finest love songs and it "deserved better" than the "sub-Spector production" of Starr's version. Alan Clayson similarly describes it as a Harrison composition that "[satisfied] every musical and lyrical qualification required of an evergreen like 'Yesterday' or his own 'Something'", yet the song received "its burial" beside the "makeweight bagatelles" on side two of Rotogravure.

== Personnel ==
As listed in the musicians' credits on the Ringo's Rotogravure LP:

- Ringo Starr – vocals, drums
- Lon Van Eaton – electric guitar
- Jane Getz – piano
- Arif Mardin – ARP string synthesizer
- Klaus Voormann – bass
- Jim Keltner – drums
- Gene Orloff – string arrangement and direction
- David Lasley – backing vocals

== Sources ==
- Dale C. Allison Jr., The Love There That's Sleeping: The Art and Spirituality of George Harrison, Continuum (New York, NY, 2006; ISBN 978-0-8264-1917-0).
- Keith Badman, The Beatles Diary Volume 2: After the Break-Up 1970–2001, Omnibus Press (London, 2001; ISBN 0-7119-8307-0).
- Harry Castleman & Walter J. Podrazik, All Together Now: The First Complete Beatles Discography 1961–1975, Ballantine Books (New York, NY, 1976; ISBN 0-345-25680-8).
- Alan Clayson, George Harrison, Sanctuary (London, 2003; ISBN 1-86074-489-3).
- Alan Clayson, Ringo Starr, Sanctuary (London, 2003; ISBN 1-86074-488-5).
- Peter Doggett, You Never Give Me Your Money: The Beatles After the Breakup, It Books (New York, NY, 2011; ISBN 978-0-06-177418-8).
- The Editors of Rolling Stone, Harrison, Rolling Stone Press/Simon & Schuster (New York, NY, 2002; ISBN 0-7432-3581-9).
- Michael Frontani, "The Solo Years", in Kenneth Womack (ed.), The Cambridge Companion to the Beatles, Cambridge University Press (Cambridge, UK, 2009; ISBN 978-1-139-82806-2).
- George Harrison, I Me Mine, Chronicle Books (San Francisco, CA, 2002; ISBN 0-8118-3793-9).
- Chris Hunt (ed.), NME Originals: Beatles – The Solo Years 1970–1980, IPC Ignite! (London, 2005).
- Elliot J. Huntley, Mystical One: George Harrison – After the Break-up of the Beatles, Guernica Editions (Toronto, ON, 2006; ISBN 1-55071-197-0).
- Ian Inglis, The Words and Music of George Harrison, Praeger (Santa Barbara, CA, 2010; ISBN 978-0-313-37532-3).
- Simon Leng, While My Guitar Gently Weeps: The Music of George Harrison, Hal Leonard (Milwaukee, WI, 2006; ISBN 1-4234-0609-5).
- Chip Madinger & Mark Easter, Eight Arms to Hold You: The Solo Beatles Compendium, 44.1 Productions (Chesterfield, MO, 2000; ISBN 0-615-11724-4).
- Robert Rodriguez, Fab Four FAQ 2.0: The Beatles' Solo Years, 1970–1980, Backbeat Books (Milwaukee, WI, 2010; ISBN 978-1-4165-9093-4).
- Robert Rodriguez, Solo in the 70s: John, Paul, George, Ringo: 1970–1980, Parading Press (Downers Grove, IL, 2013; ISBN 978-0-9892555-0-9).
- Patricia Romanowski & Holly George-Warren (eds), The New Rolling Stone Encyclopedia of Rock & Roll, Fireside/Rolling Stone Press (New York, NY, 1995; ISBN 0-684-81044-1).
- Nicholas Schaffner, The Beatles Forever, McGraw-Hill (New York, NY, 1978; ISBN 0-07-055087-5).
- Bruce Spizer, The Beatles Solo on Apple Records, 498 Productions (New Orleans, LA, 2005; ISBN 0-9662649-5-9).
- Richie Unterberger, The Unreleased Beatles: Music & Film, Backbeat Books (San Francisco, CA, 2006; ISBN 978-0-87930-892-6).
- Bob Woffinden, The Beatles Apart, Proteus (London, 1981; ISBN 0-906071-89-5).
- Warren Zanes (ed.), Tom Petty and the Heartbreakers: Runnin' Down a Dream, Chronicle Books (San Francisco, CA, 2007; ISBN 978-0-8118-6201-1).
