= Snookeroo =

- A-side label

Single by Ringo Starr

from the album Goodnight Vienna
- A-side: "No No Song (US)"
- B-side: "Oo-Wee (UK)"
- Released: 21 February 1975 (UK only)
- Genre: Rock
- Length: 3:29
- Label: Apple Records
- Songwriters: Elton John and Bernie Taupin
- Producer: Richard Perry

Ringo Starr singles chronology
"No No Song" (1974)	"Snookeroo" (1975)	"(It's All Down to) Goodnight Vienna" (1975)

"Snookeroo" is a song written by Elton John and Bernie Taupin and released by Ringo Starr on his 1974 album Goodnight Vienna.

== Writing and release ==
The song concerns a happy-go-lucky lout from northern England and was possibly inspired by, if not specifically written about Starr himself; the lyrics reference Starr's upbringing in the north of England and his laid-back manner. John recalled, "Bernie wrote really simple lyrics, very Ringo type lyrics and I tried to write a simple sort of melody to it". John also plays piano on the track and provides the count-off.

The title refers to the billiards game snooker, and has several connotations, according to the Cambridge Dictionary. Charting as a tag-along with "No No Song" in the US, it reached number three on the Billboard Hot 100. On the Cash Box chart, which listed single sides separately, it "bubbled under" at number 105.

The UK version of the single was released on 21 February 1975 with "Oo-Wee" on the B-side, (Note: UK Apple R 6004); both tracks were taken from the album Goodnight Vienna.

== Personnel ==
Personnel are taken from the Goodnight Vienna CD liner notes

- Ringo Starr – drums, vocals
- Klaus Voormann – bass
- Jim Keltner – drums
- Elton John – piano
- Robbie Robertson – guitar
- Bobby Keys, Chuck Findley, Steve Madaio and Trevor Lawrence – horns
- James Newton Howard – synthesizer
- Clydie King, Joe Greene and Linda Laurence – backing vocals

== Reception ==
Billboard described "Snookeroo" as "a perfect Ringo type cut" that is "an uptempo, happy song" with good use of horns and string instruments. Cash Box said that "it shares [John's and Taupin's] usual hit qualities" Ultimate Classic Rock critic Dave Swanson rated it Starr's 8th greatest solo song. The record failed to chart in the UK.
