= Carl Groszmann =

Australian songwriter and musician

Carl Arnold Groszmann was an Australian songwriter and musician.

Also performing as 'Carl Keats', he was the guitarist in the 1960s Australian group Steve & the Board, which included Steve Kipner and Colin Petersen. Groszmann was studying law in Brisbane when he joined Steve & the Board, and became the group's primary songwriter. The group moved from Brisbane to Sydney, and then Melbourne.

After the break-up of Steve & the Board in 1967 in Australia, several members including Groszmann relocated to London. Groszmann eventually joined Kipner's new group Tin Tin, and played on their second album Astral Taxi (1971).

In 1975 Groszmann signed to Ringo Starr's own record label Ring O' Records. He is most notable for his song "A Dose of Rock and Roll" which was covered by Starr on the 1976 album Ringo's Rotogravure. Starr's version reached #26 on the U.S. singles chart and stayed on the Billboard chart for nine weeks.

Groszmann released a single in 1977 called "Face of a Permanent Stranger" and also “I’ve Had It” - again on Ring O' Records.

His other credits as a songwriter include Status Quo's "Down the Dustpipe" (1970 UK #12 single), "Being on the Losing End" recorded by Olivia Newton-John (1973), and "Lonely Winter", recorded by the Bee Gees in their Australian phase with Maurice Gibb on lead vocals, later made available on compilations such as Inception/Nostalgia and Brilliant From Birth.

Nancy Andrews, an American photographer who dated Starr in the late 1970s, named her 2008 photo book after Groszmann's song "A Dose of Rock and Roll".

Groszmann died in Brisbane, Australia in July 2018.

== Selective discography ==
- Steve and the Board - The Giggle Eyed Goo, LP, Spin, 1966
