= Ringo 2012 =

Studio album by Ringo Starr
- Released: 30 January 2012
- Recorded: 2011
- Studios: Roccabella West, Los Angeles
- Genre: Rock
- Length: 28:55
- Labels: Hip-O, UM^{e}
- Producers: Ringo Starr; Bruce Sugar

Ringo Starr chronology
Live at the Greek Theatre 2008 (2010)	Ringo 2012 (2012)	Postcards from Paradise (2015)

Singles from Ringo 2012
- 1. "Wings" Released: 10 January 2012

Ringo 2012 is the seventeenth studio album by English singer-songwriter Ringo Starr, released on 30 January 2012 in the United Kingdom and 31 January 2012 in the United States. It was released on CD, LP and digitally by Hip-O Records and UM^{e}. The title of the album refers back to his most successful album ‘Ringo’, from 1973. It includes two new recordings of songs from previous albums, including “Step Lightly” from the original 1973 album.

Like previous recent albums by Ringo Starr, one of the tracks, “In Liverpool”, celebrates his home town.

== History ==
Starr had considered calling the album Motel California, then Another #9, and finally Wings, before settling on Ringo 2012. The album was recorded in Los Angeles, and mixed in England, produced by Starr and Bruce Sugar. The title is a reference to Starr's most successful solo album, Ringo, which was released in 1973. At less than 29 minutes in length, it was his shortest album to date.

Ringo 2012 includes new recordings of two songs that Starr had issued on previous albums: "Step Lightly", from Ringo, and "Wings", from 1977's Ringo the 4th. His cover of Buddy Holly's "Think It Over" was released on the Listen to Me: Buddy Holly tribute album before its appearance on Ringo 2012. The new version of "Wings" was released as a single a few weeks in advance of the album.

The inclusion of the track "In Liverpool" meant that Ringo 2012 was Starr's third consecutive album to include a song about Liverpool, his hometown. Asked why this was, he told Alan Light of Newsweek: "I came to the conclusion a while ago that I do not want to write an autobiography, because all anybody wants is those eight years from 1962 to 1970, and I would have ten volumes before we got there. So I thought I'll do it in song, and do vignettes of certain aspects of my life."

The cover photograph and as well as other photographs within the album's artwork were taken by rock photographer Rob Shanahan, who had worked closely with Starr for seven years.

== Reception ==
Professional ratings
Aggregate scores
Source	Rating
Metacritic	59/100
Review scores
Source	Rating
AllMusic	2.5/5 stars
Goldmine	3/5 stars
Los Angeles Times	2.5/4 stars
New Zealand Herald	1.5/5
The Observer	2/5 stars
PopMatters	6/10 stars
Record Collector	3/5 stars
Rolling Stone	3/5 stars

At Metacritic, Ringo 2012 holds an average Metascore of 59 out of 100, based on five professional reviews, indicating a "mixed or average" reception. The album debuted at numbers 80 and 181 in the US and UK, selling 6,348 and 752 copies respectively, as of February 2012.

Jon Dolan, writing in Rolling Stone magazine, considered the album, while being essentially like all of Starr’s previous solo albums, to be produced with “unchanging bonhomie” and “nice vibes”.

Dan Bertiaume in Glide Magazine, similarly commented that the album “could easily have been released in 1982” and says “Ringo’s simple and cheery take on life is alive, well, and maybe even desperately needed”.

== Track listing ==
CD

No.	Title	Writer(s)	Length
1.	"Anthem"	Richard Starkey, Glen Ballard	5:01
2.	"Wings"	Starkey, Vini Poncia	3:31
3.	"Think It Over"	Buddy Holly, Norman Petty	1:48
4.	"Samba"	Starkey, Van Dyke Parks	2:48
5.	"Rock Island Line"	Traditional; arranged by Starkey	2:59
6.	"Step Lightly"	Starkey	2:44
7.	"Wonderful"	Starkey, Gary Nicholson	3:47
8.	"In Liverpool"	Starkey, Dave Stewart	3:19
9.	"Slow Down"	Starkey, Joe Walsh	2:57

DVD edition

Amazon.com Exclusive DVD Version
No.	Title	Length
1.	"Introduction" (Inspiration for the Album)	0:37
2.	"Anthem" ("... The First Words That Came to Me ...")	2:02
3.	"Wings" ("Doing It My Way")	1:41
4.	"Think It Over" (Peter Asher's Suggestion ... The Steel Drum Button ... "It's Like a Shuffle ...")	1:48
5.	"Samba" (The Crazy Record Track with Van Dyke Parks ... And Hanging Out with Really Good People)	0:58
6.	"Rock Island Line" (Skiffle, Rock and "Where I Came In ...")	1:15
7.	"Step Lightly" ("... I Can Do This Different Now ...")	0:41
8.	"Wonderful" ("When It Gets to the Gong ..." Directing the Sentiment)	1:56
9.	"In Liverpool" ("... It's As Easy As Peaches and Cream ..." The Mini-Biography)	2:13
10.	"Slow Down" ("'Cause It Rhymed" ... And "... We Can Rock")	1:10
11.	"Peace Dream" (From "Y Not" / "The Dream Keeps Unfolding")	1:00
12.	"End Credits"	0:30

== Personnel ==
Personnel per booklet.

Musicians

- Ringo Starr – lead and backing vocals, drums, percussion, keyboards (1-4), acoustic guitar (3, 5-6)
- Joe Walsh – guitar
- Kenny Wayne Shepherd – guitar
- David A. Stewart – guitar, keyboards (8)
- Steve Dudas – guitar, bass guitar
- Don Was – bass guitar
- Michael Bradford – bass guitar
- Charlie Haden – double bass
- Ann Marie Calhoun – violin (8)
- Matt Cartsonis – mandolin (4)
- Bruce Sugar – keyboards, piano, horn, arrangement, organ, synth horns
- Van Dyke Parks – keyboards, accordion, string arrangement (4)
- Benmont Tench – organ
- Edgar Winter – Saxophone, organ
- Amy Keys – backing vocals
- Kelly Moneymaker – backing vocals
- Richard Page – bass (7), backing vocals (3)

Production

- Ringo Starr – producer
- Bruce Sugar – recording
- Ned Douglas – recording assistant
- Ringo Starr, Bruce Sugar – mixing
- Chris Bellman – mastering
- Barry Korkin – UM^{e} A&R coordination
- Christine Telleck – production manager
- David Tashman – legal
- Adam Starr – product manager
- Vartan – art direction
- Rob Shanahan – photos
- Mike Fink, Philip Manning, Meire Murakami – design

== Charts ==
Chart (2012)	Peak position
Austrian Albums (Ö3 Austria)	75
German Albums (Offizielle Top 100)	69
Japanese Albums (Oricon)	110
US Billboard 200	80
US Top Rock Albums (Billboard)	21
