= Old Wave =

Studio album by Ringo Starr
- Released: 16 June 1983
- Recorded: 23 July 1978; February, 6–16 April, May–July 1982
- Studios: Sweet Silence Studios, Copenhagen, Denmark; Ascot Sound Studios, Berkshire, England
- Genre: Rock
- Length: 36:52
- Labels: Bellaphon (Germany); RCA Victor (Canada)
- Producers: Joe Walsh; Russ Ballard

Ringo Starr chronology
Stop and Smell the Roses (1981)	Old Wave (1983)	Starr Struck: Best of Ringo Starr, Vol. 2 (1989)

Singles from Old Wave
- 1. "In My Car" Released: 16 June 1983 (Germany only); 2. "I Keep Forgettin'" Released: 1984 (Mexico only)

Professional ratings
Review scores
Source	Rating
AllMusic	2/5 stars
The Encyclopedia of Popular Music	1/5 stars
The Essential Rock Discography	3/10
MusicHound	2/5
The Rolling Stone Album Guide	2/5 stars

Old Wave is the ninth studio album by the English rock musician Ringo Starr. It was originally released in June 1983, on the label Bellaphon, and is the two-year follow-up to his 1981 album Stop and Smell the Roses. The title is a play on new wave music.

== Background and recording ==
After John Lennon's murder in December 1980, Starr returned home to England to live at Tittenhurst Park, which Starr had purchased from Lennon in 1973. In early 1982, Starr was eager to move on to his next solo project. Deciding that he needed more consistency this time around, he would work with only one producer, Joe Walsh, a former member of the recently disbanded Eagles. Walsh and Starr had known each other since the mid-1970s, having met and befriended each other in Los Angeles. Walsh immediately agreed to work with Starr and they met at Tittenhurst in February to begin writing material. Recording began shortly afterwards and instrumental backing tracks for seven songs were recorded at Startling Studios, after Starr had previously converted Lennon's recording studio. Engineering duties were handled by Jim Nipor. These sessions were mainly done with a team consisting of Starr on drums and percussion, Walsh on guitar and backing vocals, Mo Foster on bass and both Gary Brooker and Chris Stainton on keyboards.

Sessions came to a halt when Walsh and Nipor went to California on 19 March. Sessions recommenced on 6 April for a few days until 16 April. On 15 April, Rolling Stone broke the news that Starr was "in London working on a new album with Joe Walsh acting as the producer." Lead vocals were laid down from 19 to 23 April. Sometime in May, Starr requested permission from the Windsor and Maidenhead District Council to build a new building on his Tittenhurst Park land, which he would use for video and recording purposes. Sessions resumed from 31 May until 10 June; the next day, taking the masters recorded up to that point with him, Starr and his wife Barbara Bach flew from London to Los Angeles, and returned on 14 June. The album was finished with a third batch of sessions from 24 June into early July.

"Everybody's in a Hurry But Me" came about from a jam session between the Who bassist John Entwistle, drummer and percussionist Ray Cooper and Eric Clapton. "As Far as We Can Go" was originally recorded at Sweet Silence Studios in Copenhagen, Denmark, on 23 July 1978. From that original rendition, only the vocal was used. Walsh re-recorded an entirely new track using one of the latest technology synthesizers.

== Release and aftermath ==
The album was originally titled It Beats Sleep. The portrait on the album cover was shot in a booth in northern England, taken before Starr had joined the Beatles. As Starr's RCA contract had been cancelled, he needed to find a new label for Old Wave. Although it was just over a decade after the Beatles' dissolution, no major UK or US record company was interested in signing him. Starr would not accept that and was determined to have Old Wave released any way he could. The album was due to be released on the Boardwalk label, but never appeared, due to the death of the label's head, Neil Bogart. RCA Canada ended up distributing the album in June 1983 in Canada, Australia, New Zealand, Japan, the Netherlands, Mexico, and Brazil; while in Germany, the album and lone single pulled from it, both released on 16 June, appeared on Bellaphon but used leftover Boardwalk labels. (Note: Germany Bellaphon 260.16.029) The Canadian release of the album occurred on 24 June. (Note: Canada RCA DXL 1–3233) However, Old Wave failed to achieve success in any of these territories, and would be Starr's last studio album until 1992's Time Takes Time. Two singles were pulled from the album: one in Germany, "In My Car", backed with "As Far as We Can Go", (Note: Germany Bellephon 100.16.012) and the other in Mexico ("I Keep Forgettin'" b/w "She's About a Mover").

Walsh's 1987 album Got Any Gum? included a cover of "In My Car", which was released as a single and became a moderate hit. Four tracks from the album appeared on Starr's US compilation Starr Struck: Best of Ringo Starr, Vol. 2 in 1989. The album was reissued on CD in the US by The Right Stuff on 22 August 1994, the same day as Stop and Smell the Roses (1981). (Note: US The Right Stuff T2-29675) Both CD and cassette deluxe editions included a bonus track, the original 1978 version of "As Far as We Can Go". On 1 November 1994, Right Stuff re-released "In My Car", this time on yellow vinyl, with "She's About a Mover" as the B-side. A promotional CD was released in 1994 by Capitol, featuring three songs from both Old Wave and Stop and Smell the Roses. (Note: The Old Wave tracks were: "Be My Baby", "In My Car" and "She's About a Mover".) The album was rereleased on brown smoke colored vinyl for Record Store Day in 2022 along with Ringo the 4th. The rerelease included "As Far as We Can Go (Original Version)", which was not included on any previous vinyl issues.

== Track listing ==
Side one
No.	Title	Writer(s)	Length
1.	"In My Car"	Richard Starkey; Joe Walsh; Mo Foster; Kim Goody	3:13
2.	"Hopeless"	Starkey; Walsh	3:17
3.	"Alibi"	Starkey; Walsh	4:00
4.	"Be My Baby"	Walsh	3:44
5.	"She's About a Mover"	Doug Sahm	3:52

Side two
No.	Title	Writer(s)	Length
1.	"I Keep Forgettin'"	Jerry Leiber; Mike Stoller	4:18
2.	"Picture Show Life"	John Reid; John Slate	4:21
3.	"As Far as We Can Go"	Russ Ballard	3:52
4.	"Everybody's in a Hurry But Me"	Starkey; Walsh; John Entwistle; Eric Clapton; Chris Stainton	2:35
5.	"Going Down"	Starkey; Walsh	3:34

Bonus track on the 1994 re-issue

No.	Title	Writer(s)	Length
11.	"As Far as We Can Go" (original version)	Ballard	5:33

== Personnel ==
Track numbering refers to CD and digital releases of the album.

- Ringo Starr – lead vocals (all tracks), drums (1–4, 7, 9, 10), percussion (1–4, 6, 7, 10), backing vocals (10)
- Joe Walsh – guitar (all tracks), backing vocals (1–8, 10), synthesizer (8), harmonica (10)
- Waddy Wachtel – guitar (7, 10), harmonica (10)
- Eric Clapton – guitar (9)
- Kal David – guitar (5)
- Sherwood Ball – guitar (5)
- Chris Stainton – keyboards (1–4, 6, 7, 9, 10)
- Gary Brooker – keyboards (1–4, 6, 7, 10), backing vocals (10)
- Joe Vitale – piano (8), backing vocals (8)
- Bruce MacPherson – Hammond organ (5)
- Mo Foster – bass guitar (1–4, 6–8, 10), backing vocals (10)
- Freebo – tuba (5), bass guitar (5)
- John Entwistle – bass guitar (9)

- Kenny Edwards – bass guitar (10)
- Peter Bunetta – drums (5)
- Russ Kunkel – drums (6)
- Ray Cooper – percussion (6, 9)
- Sam Clayton – percussion (5)
- Joe Lala – percussion (5)
- Jocko Marcellino – percussion (5)
- David Wooford – saxophone (5)
- Lee Thornburg – trumpet (5)
- Garrett Adkins – trombone (5)
- Mark Easterling – backing vocals (1, 7)
- Steve Hess – backing vocals (1, 7)
- Patrick Maroshek – backing vocals (1, 7)
- Barbara Bach – backing vocals (10)
