= Stop and Smell the Roses (Ringo Starr album) =

Studio album by Ringo Starr
- Released: 27 October 1981
- Recorded: 11 July 1980 – 12 February 1981
- Genre: Rock
- Length: 32:23
- Label: Boardwalk (US), RCA (UK)
- Producer: Paul McCartney; George Harrison; Harry Nilsson; Ronnie Wood; Stephen Stills; Ringo Starr

Ringo Starr chronology
Bad Boy (1978)	Stop and Smell the Roses (1981)	Old Wave (1983)

Singles from Stop and Smell the Roses
- 1. "Wrack My Brain" Released: 27 October 1981 (US); 13 November 1981 (UK); 2. "Private Property" Released: 13 January 1982

Stop and Smell the Roses is the eighth studio album by the English rock musician Ringo Starr. Released in October 1981, it followed the twin commercial failures of Ringo the 4th (1977) and Bad Boy (1978). The album includes the hit single "Wrack My Brain", written and produced by George Harrison, but otherwise failed to find commercial success. It also includes contributions from Paul McCartney, Harry Nilsson, Ronnie Wood and Stephen Stills.

The album began life in mid-1980 as Can't Fight Lightning, while Starr was signed to Portrait Records. After the label withdrew its support, the project lay dormant until he signed with the RCA subsidiary Boardwalk Records in 1981. John Lennon had intended to participate in the recording process, having offered Starr the songs "Life Begins at 40" and "Nobody Told Me", but he was murdered a month prior to the scheduled sessions, leaving Starr too upset to record either song. Stop and Smell the Roses was reissued in 1994 with six bonus tracks.

== Background and recording ==
While visiting John Lennon at his Dakota apartment, Starr was given a demo of "Life Begins at 40" by Lennon. The song has the characteristic country style that Starr loved so much, and was recorded on a cassette tape with Lennon's vocals, his acoustic guitar and a drum machine. Lennon wrote the song specifically for Starr, and wanted him to record it for his next album. However, the home demo remained unreleased until it was included on the 1998 John Lennon Anthology compilation. Soon after meeting soon-to-be second wife Barbara Bach on the film set of Caveman in early 1980, Ringo Starr met fellow former-Beatle Paul McCartney, and his wife, Linda, at a hotel while they had earlier visited the 33rd annual Cannes Film Festival, on 16 May. Starr asked McCartney whether he would like to play on and possibly produce Starr's next album, to which McCartney agreed. Starr started sessions in France for a new album, at this point titled Can't Fight Lightning, on 11 July, at Super Bear Studios, lasting until 21 July. With Wings then in limbo and McCartney II just released, McCartney booked time with Starr to record three songs: "Private Property" and "Attention" (both McCartney originals) plus a cover of "Sure to Fall". They also recorded the song "You Can't Fight Lightning", which Starr wrote after he and Bach were nearly struck by lightning. On 27 July following a brief holiday, Starr and Bach flew to Los Angeles. Recording moved to Devonshire Sound Studio in Hollywood on 11 August.

Next Stephen Stills got involved, writing "You've Got a Nice Way" for Starr and producing its recording that August. On 4 September the recording session moved again, this time to Cherokee Studios. Ronnie Wood of The Rolling Stones was keen to help out and brought with him the song "Dead Giveaway" on 23 September, which they co-produced. On the 25th, the pair taped the track "Brandy". Starr recorded alone on 27 September. On 6 November Starr and Wood demoed the song "I Don't Believe You". Long-time friend Harry Nilsson was next on Starr's checklist, presenting him with "Drumming Is My Madness" as well as the album's title track, both of which were recorded in early November, with early December sessions completing the work of the cork. Before returning home to England, Starr planned for another session to be held at the studio on 14 January. After working with McCartney, Starr also felt it appropriate to extend the invitation to his two other bandmates in The Beatles; Upon his return to his Tittenhurst Park residence on 10 November, Starr phoned George Harrison, inviting him to appear on the album. When Starr arrived at Harrison's Friar Park estate on 19 November, Harrison presented him with "Wrack My Brain", which he had composed for Starr.

"You Belong to Me", another cover from the past, was recorded, with Harrison producing. Starr also recorded a version of "All Those Years Ago", but Starr told Harrison the vocal was too high for his range and he did not like the words. Lennon was the last of the former-Beatles that Starr had yet to visit and – fresh from his musical re-awakening, having just released Double Fantasy – Lennon was eager to meet with Starr. On 26 November, in New York City, Lennon handed Starr the demos for "Nobody Told Me". With Lennon producing, they set a date, the one Starr had originally booked, for 14 January 1981 to record the song. Starr and Bach flew from New York to Los Angeles, on 28 November. Back in Hollywood two days later, Starr, Nilsson and engineer Paul Travis listened to playbacks of the July sessions at Compass Point Studios. On 1 December, Starr laid down vocals for "You Can't Fight Lightning". For the next two days, Starr and Jarvis mixed the album. On 4 December, Starr added vocals to a re-make of "Back Off Boogaloo". The next day Starr flew to the Bahamas to be with Bach. On 8 December, Lennon was shot and killed. After a period of mourning, Starr returned to the studio on 14 January 1981. Harrison took the "All Those Years Ago" track, changed some of the lyrics and, with overdubs by Paul and Linda McCartney, it was released as a tribute to Lennon.

Starr, with Wood, recorded for three days from the 14th, at Cherokee Studios, with a further final batch of sessions taking place from 20 January until 12 February. During this time, the tracks "Dead Giveaway", "Wake Up", "Brandy", "You Belong to Me" and "Wrack My Brain" were finished. On 13 February, final mixes of the tracks were made at Compass Point Studios and ten tracks were chosen for release on the album.

== Release and aftermath ==
Professional ratings
Review scores
Source	Rating
AllMusic	3/5 stars
The Encyclopedia of Popular Music	2/5 stars
The Essential Rock Discography	5/10
MusicHound Rock: The Essential Album Guide	2.5/5 stars
Rolling Stone	3/5 stars
The Rolling Stone Album Guide	2/5 stars

In April 1981, Starr left record label Portrait due to a disagreement with its distributor, CBS, who was due to release the Can't Fight Lightning version of the album. Starr would eventually sign to RCA Records (and a subsidiary called Boardwalk in the US), for a multi-album deal. At the Egham Aerodrome in Surrey, on 16 and 17 September, Starr filmed promo videos for the tracks "Wrack My Brain" and "Stop and Take the Time to Smell the Roses", both of which were directed by Keef & Co. On 18 September interior filming in London took place for "Wrack My Brain". The next day the promo for was edited for airing on TV. Over a month later, from 26 October until 12 December, Starr gave several interviews to help promote the album. Two days later, he appeared in a radio interview for WBEN, again, to promote the album. Harrison's "Wrack My Brain", backed with "Drumming Is My Madness", was the first single, released on 27 October, the same day as the album in the US by Boardwalk. (Note: Single: US Boardwalk NB7-11-130; Album: US Boardwalk NB1 33246) In the UK, the single was released on 13 November by RCA. (Note: UK RCA 166) While it missed the UK charts, it managed to give Starr his final US Top 40 hit, reaching number 38. In South Africa, "Wrack My Brain" reached number 17. It also charted in Switzerland (#32) and did well in Belgium (#10). Record World said of the single release of "Wrack My Brain" that "You can't help but love Ringo here, as he sings of a stifled romance."

With a re-sequenced running order and design change, the album was renamed Stop and Smell the Roses, after Nilsson's donated song. The initial pressing was scratch and sniff per designer John Kosh. The album was released in the UK on 20 November. (Note: UK RCA LP 6022) Another radio interview to promote the album was held on 2 December, by Capitol Radio in Los Angeles. Stop and Smell the Roses reached no higher than number 98 in the US. On 31 December, the HMV store in London announced that despite the busy Christmas period, only 30 copies of the album had been sold by the store. On 13 January 1982, McCartney's "Private Property" was released as the second single, backed with "Stop and Take the Time to Smell the Roses", in the US, but failed to chart anywhere. (Note: US Boardwalk NB7-11-134) Nonplussed, RCA dropped Starr in 1982. For the first time in his career, Starr was out of a recording contract with neither a UK nor US label willing to sign him. On 12 December 1982, the "Wrack My Brain" promo aired on Parkinson.

An 11-minute promotional film The Cooler was made, directed by ex-10cc members Kevin Godley and Lol Creme featuring Starr, Barbra Bach, Paul McCartney and Linda McCartney. The film utilized "Sure to Fall" and the McCartney penned songs "Private Property" and "Attention". It premiered at the Cannes Film Festival on 24 May, 1982.

Stop and Smell the Roses was reissued on CD, on the same day as Old Wave, in the US by The Right Stuff on 22 August, 1994 with bonus tracks. (Note: US The Right Stuff T2-29676)

"Wrack My Brain" was re-released, this time on red vinyl, with "Private Property" as the B-side, on The Right Stuff on 1 November. A promotional CD was released in 1994 by Capitol, featuring three songs from both Old Wave (1983) and Stop and Smell the Roses. (Note: The Stop and Smell the Roses tracks were: "Wrack My Brain", "Dead Giveaway" and "Private Property".)

The album was re-released as a double LP with bonus tracks for Record Store Day 2023.

== Track listing ==
Side one
No.	Title	Writer(s)	Producer	Length
1.	"Private Property"	Paul McCartney	McCartney	2:44
2.	"Wrack My Brain"	George Harrison	Harrison	2:21
3.	"Drumming is My Madness"	Harry Nilsson	Nilsson	3:29
4.	"Attention"	Paul McCartney	McCartney	3:20
5.	"Stop and Take the Time to Smell the Roses"	Richard Starkey, Nilsson	Nilsson	3:08

Side two
No.	Title	Writer(s)	Producer	Length
1.	"Dead Giveaway"	Starkey, Ronnie Wood	Ringo Starr, Wood	4:28
2.	"You Belong to Me"	Pee Wee King, Redd Stewart, Chilton Price	Harrison	2:09
3.	"Sure to Fall"	Carl Perkins, Quinton Claunch, William Cantrell	McCartney	3:42
4.	"You've Got a Nice Way"	Stephen Stills, Michael Stergis	Stills	3:33
5.	"Back Off Boogaloo"	Starkey	Nilsson	3:16

CD Bonus tracks
No.	Title	Writer(s)	Producer	Length
11.	"Wake Up"	Starkey	Wood	3:45
12.	"Red and Black Blues"	Lane Tietgen	Stills	3:20
13.	"Brandy"	Joseph B. Jefferson, Charles B. Simmons	Starr, Wood	4:08
14.	"Stop and Take the Time to Smell the Roses" (Original vocal version)	Starkey, Nilsson	Nilsson	3:09
15.	"You Can't Fight Lightning"	Starkey	McCartney	5:41
16.	"Hand Gun Promos"	N/A		2:02

Can't Fight Lightning tracklist
No.	Title	Length
1.	"Attention"	3:20
2.	"Private Property"	2:44
3.	"You've Got a Nice Way"	3:33
4.	"Wake Up"	3:45
5.	"You Can't Fight Lightning"	5:41
6.	"Wrack My Brain"	2:21
7.	"Dead Giveaway"	4:28
8.	"Brandy"	4:08
9.	"You Belong to Me"	2:09
10.	"Stop and Take the Time to Smell the Roses"	3:08

== Personnel ==
- Ringo Starr – lead vocals, drums, percussion
- Paul McCartney – bass guitar (tracks 1, 4, 8), piano (tracks 1, 4, 8), backing vocals (tracks 1, 4, 8)
- George Harrison – acoustic guitar, lead guitar, backing vocals (track 2)
- Ronnie Wood – guitar, acoustic bass guitar, saxophone, keyboards, backing vocals (track 6)
- Ray Cooper – piano, synthesizer, percussion, vocoder, backing vocals (track 2, 6)
- Dennis Budimir – guitar (tracks 3, 5, 10)
- Michael Sturgis – rhythm guitar (track 9)
- Stephen Stills – lead guitar (track 9)
- Fred Tackett – guitar (tracks 3, 5, 10), banjo (track 5)
- Laurence Juber – acoustic guitar (tracks 4, 8)
- Richie Zito – guitar (tracks 3, 5, 10)
- Al Kooper – electric piano, electric guitar (track 2)
- Dennis Belfield – bass guitar (tracks 3, 5, 10)
- Wilton Felder – bass guitar (track 6)
- Harley Thompson – bass guitar (track 9)
- Herbie Flowers – bass guitar, tuba (track 2, 7)
- Lloyd Green – pedal steel guitar (track 8)
- Jane Getz – piano (tracks 3, 5, 10)
- Mike Finnigan – piano, organ (track 9)
- Greg Mathieson – piano (track 6)
- Joe Sample – piano (track 6)
- Jim Keltner – drums, percussion (tracks 3, 5, 10)
- Joe Lala – percussion (tracks 3, 5)
- Howie Casey – saxophone (tracks 4, 8)
- Jim Gordon – baritone saxophone (track 10)
- Jerry Jumonville – tenor saxophone
- Bruce Paulson – trombone (track 3)
- Rick Riccio – flute, backing vocals
- Lee Thornburg – trumpet (track 3)
- Sheila Casey – backing vocals
- Linda McCartney – backing vocals
- Harry Nilsson – backing vocals
- Lezlee Livrano Pariser – backing vocals

Technical

- Alan Pariser, Rick Riccio – engineer
- John Kosh – art director
- Aaron Rapoport – cover photography

== Charts ==
Chart (1981–82)	Peak position
Austrian Albums (Ö3 Austria)	13
US Billboard 200	98
