= Ringo the 4th =

Studio album by Ringo Starr
- Released: 20 September 1977
- Recorded: February and June 1977
- Studios: Cherokee, Los Angeles; Atlantic, New York City
- Genres: Disco; funk; pop
- Length: 38:05
- Labels: Polydor (UK); Atlantic (US)
- Producer: Arif Mardin

Ringo Starr chronology
Ringo's Rotogravure (1976)	Ringo the 4th (1977)	Bad Boy (1978)

Singles from Ringo the 4th
- 1. "Wings" Released: 25 August 1977 (US); 2. "Drowning in the Sea of Love" Released: 16 September 1977; 3. "Sneaking Sally Through the Alley" Released: 1977 (Aus); 4. "Tango All Night" Released: 1978 (Arg)

Ringo the 4th is the sixth studio album by the English musician Ringo Starr, released on 20 September 1977. Its title is sometimes ascribed to him being the fourth member of the Beatles. Others have suggested that it is his fourth mainstream album, which excludes his Great American Songbook homage, Sentimental Journey, and his country-western foray, Beaucoups of Blues. Ringo the 4th is a disco-oriented record, crafted for him by his Atlantic Records producer, Arif Mardin.

== Background and recording ==
After the commercial disappointment of Ringo's Rotogravure (1976), Starr abandoned his usual formula of using his well-known musician friends (notably his fellow ex-Beatles) to write songs and provide instrumentation on his albums. Instead, he intensified his partnership with songwriter and close friend Vini Poncia; for his next album, Starr and Poncia decided to write most of the songs themselves while using the input of different musicians. Starr also wanted to keep his sound up-to-date and attempted to partially reinvent himself as a disco singer to capitalize on the genre's growing popularity. Sessions began on 5 February 1977, at Cherokee Studios in Los Angeles, with production overseen by Arif Mardin.

The first songs recorded were two unreleased tracks, "Lover Please" and "Wild Shining Stars". Near the end of the month, Starr recorded "Out on the Streets", "It's No Secret" and "Gypsies in Flight". In June, recording sessions were held at Atlantic Studios in New York. where the tracks that ended up on the album were recorded. In addition, the B-side "Just a Dream", as well as an unreleased track, "By Your Side", were recorded. Starr moved back to Cherokee Studios, where he held more sessions towards the end of the month, where a few more unreleased tracks were recorded: "Birmingham", "This Party", and a different version of "Just a Dream". David Foster played keyboards on a couple of songs, while Melissa Manchester, Luther Vandross, and Bette Midler occasionally appeared on backing vocals.

== Packaging ==
Nancy Lee Andrews, Starr's fiancée at the time, used Rita Wolf as a model in the photo shoot for the album's cover. The photo used on the album front cover shows Wolf's legs and she is sitting on Starr's shoulders. The back cover is a photo taken from the back of Starr and Wolf showing her bottom in tight pink pants. Art Direction and Album Cover Design by John Kosh.

== Release ==
"Wings", backed with "Just a Dream", was released as a single in the US on 25 August 1977. On 5 September Starr promoted the single by having an interview with Los Angeles DJ Dave Herman. On 16 September, "Drowning in the Sea of Love", backed with "Just a Dream" was released in the UK. (Note: UK Polydor 2001 734) Ringo the 4th was released on 20 September in the UK, (Note: UK Polydor Super 2310 556) and 10 days later in the US. (Note: US Atlantic SD 19108)

The album was a failure upon its release, both commercially and critically. Never touching the UK charts, the album managed to make it to No. 162 in the US. The "Drowning in the Sea of Love" single, originally planned as the first US single, was released in the US on 18 October. (Note: US Atlantic 3412) Shortly thereafter, Atlantic dropped Starr from their roster. In the UK, Polydor fulfilled its three-album contractual requirement by following up with a children's album, Scouse the Mouse (1977) which featured Starr, in the lead role, performing eight of fifteen tracks.

Neither of the two singles pulled from Ringo the 4th, "Wings" or "Drowning in the Sea of Love", charted in the US. In foreign countries, other songs were released as singles: "Sneaking Sally Through the Alley", backed with "Tango All Night" (Australia) and "Tango All Night", backed with "It's No Secret" (Argentina). Ringo the 4th was reissued on CD, on the same day as Ringo's Rotogravure, in the US on 16 August 1992, by Atlantic. The song "Wings" was re-recorded years later, and released on Ringo's Ringo 2012 album and again as a lead single in 2012. The album was re-issued on Valentine's Day in 2020 as two different colored vinyl variants (gold and red) by Friday Music. The album saw another reissue as part of Record Store Day in 2022 with a translucent orange vinyl along with Starr's 1983 album Old Wave.

== Critical reception ==
Professional ratings
Review scores
Source	Rating
AllMusic	2/5 stars
Christgau's Record Guide	D
The Encyclopedia of Popular Music	2/5 stars
The Essential Rock Discography	4/10
MusicHound Rock	2/5 stars
Rolling Stone	(not rated)
The Rolling Stone Album Guide	2/5 stars

Music webzine Drowned in Sound contributor Hayden Woolley commented in 2015 that the disco-flavored album "sees Ringo climb aboard the booty-shaking bandwagon with all the grace of a rhinoceros mounting a swan." Wooley adds that Starr is no "Donna Summer" and that even though the album was a "critical and commercial disaster," it provides "an absolute treasure trove of unintentional comedy." Wooley draws particular attention to "Drowning in the Sea of Love," saying it "bubbles into life with synthesised stabs and a slinky funk bassline, before Ringo falls repeatedly on his face like a drunken man trying to climb down from a trampoline."

PopDose contributor David Allen Jones commented in 2017 that the album's considerable failure did not "seem to bother our boy very much—this was at the height of his LA party animal phase, and he was always seen out and about and drinking copiously and generally loving life." Jones highlighted "Can She Do It Like She Dances?," calling it one of the album's better moments: "the arrangement reminds me a lot of can-can dancing or something, appropriate given the subject matter, in which Ringo drunkenly (and I do mean drunkenly) seems to slobber all over the mike as he wonders if the object of his affection can 'do it' like she dances." Jones adds that Starr sounds "guttural and horny as hell."

In drawing comparisons to Starr's fellow Beatles, Rhino commented that "the idea of a Beatle doing disco didn't pan out nearly as well for Ringo as it did for Paul with 'Goodnight Tonight'."

== Track listing ==
All tracks written by Ringo Starr and Vini Poncia, except where noted.

Side one
No.	Title	Writer(s)	Length
1.	"Drowning in the Sea of Love"	Kenny Gamble, Leon Huff	5:09
2.	"Tango All Night"	Steve Hague, Tom Seufert	2:58
3.	"Wings"		3:26
4.	"Gave It All Up"		4:41
5.	"Out on the Streets"		4:29

Side two
No.	Title	Writer(s)	Length
1.	"Can She Do It Like She Dances"	Steve Duboff, Gerry Robinson	3:12
2.	"Sneaking Sally Through the Alley"	Allen Toussaint	4:17
3.	"It's No Secret"		3:42
4.	"Gypsies in Flight"		3:02
5.	"Simple Love Song"		2:57

== Personnel ==
Credits are adapted from the Ringo the 4th liner notes.

- Ringo Starr – lead vocals, drums (A1 – B1, B3)
- David Spinozza – guitar (A1 – B1, B3)
- John Tropea – guitar (A1 – B1, B3)
- Jeff Mironov – guitar (A1 – B1, B3)
- Cornell Dupree – guitar (B 2)
- Lon Van Eaton – guitar (B 2)
- Dick Fegy – acoustic guitar (B 4)
- Danny Kortchmar – guitar (B 5)
- David Bromberg – guitar (B 4)
- Tony Levin – bass guitar (A1 – B1, B3)
- Chuck Rainey – bass guitar (B 2, B 5)
- Hugh McDonald – bass guitar (B 4)
- Don Grolnick – keyboards (A1 – B1, B3)
- David Foster – electric guitar, clavinet (B 2), piano, keyboards (B 5)
- Jeff Gutcheon – electric piano (B 4)
- Nicky Marrero – percussion (B 2)
- Ken Bichel – synthesizer
- Steve Gadd – drums
- Michael Brecker – tenor saxophone
- Randy Brecker – trumpet, leader of brass and reeds
- Don Brooks – harmonica
- Arnold McCuller – backing vocals
- Brie Howard – backing vocals
- David Lasley – backing vocals
- Debra Gray – backing vocals
- Duitch Helmer – backing vocals
- Jim Gilstrap – backing vocals
- Joe Bean – backing vocals
- Luther Vandross – backing vocals
- Lynn Pitney – backing vocals
- Marietta Waters – backing vocals
- Maxine Anderson – backing vocals
- Melissa Manchester – backing vocals
- Rebecca Louis – backing vocals
- Robin Clark – backing vocals
- Vini Poncia – backing vocals
- Bette Midler – backing vocals (A 2)
- Gene Orloff – concertmaster

== Charts ==
Chart (1977)	Peak position
Australian Albums (Kent Music Report)	65
Canada Top Albums/CDs (RPM)	94
Japanese Albums (Oricon)	71
US Billboard 200	162
