= Hoyt Axton =

American singer-songwriter and actor (1938–1999)

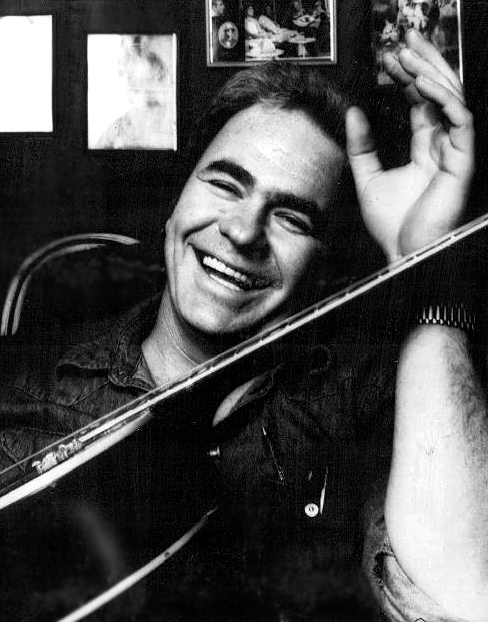
- Axton in 1976

Background information
- Born: Hoyt Wayne Axton; March 25, 1938; Duncan, Oklahoma, U.S.
- Origin: Comanche, Oklahoma
- Died: October 26, 1999 (aged 61) Victor, Montana, U.S.
- Genres: Country; folk; blues; rock
- Occupations: Singer; songwriter; actor
- Instruments: Vocals; guitar
- Years active: 1962–1999
- Labels: A&M; Brylen; Vee Jay
- Website: Official website

Hoyt Wayne Axton (March 25, 1938 – October 26, 1999) was an American singer-songwriter, guitarist, and actor. He became prominent in the early 1960s, establishing himself on the West Coast as a folk singer with an earthy style and powerful voice. Among his best-known songs are "Joy to the World", "The Pusher", "No No Song", "Greenback Dollar", "Della and the Dealer", "Never Been to Spain", and "Boney Fingers".

He was also a prolific character actor with many film and television roles to his credit, playing a father figure in a number of films, including The Black Stallion (1979), Heart Like a Wheel (1983), and Gremlins (1984).

== Early life ==
Born in Duncan, Oklahoma, Axton spent his preteen years in Comanche, Oklahoma, with his brother John. His mother Mae Boren Axton, a songwriter, cowrote the song "Heartbreak Hotel", which became a major hit for Elvis Presley. Some of Hoyt's own songs were later recorded by Presley. Axton's father John Thomas Axton was a naval officer stationed in Jacksonville, Florida, where the family joined him in 1949.

Axton graduated from high school in Jacksonville in 1956 and was in debt to the town for some years afterwards from being involved in an act of vandalism that resulted in the burning of a hardware store.

He attended Oklahoma State University on a scholarship, where he played football, but he left to enlist in the U.S. Navy. Axton held the rank of petty officer second class and served on two ships, the USS Princeton (CV-37) and the USS Ranger (CVA-61).

Axton was a distant cousin of musician Arlo Guthrie. He was also the first cousin of David Boren, who served as governor of Oklahoma and three terms in the United States Senate and was also president of the University of Oklahoma.

== Career ==
After his discharge from the Navy, Axton made his way to southern California and began singing folk songs in clubs and coffee houses. In the early 1960s, he released his first folk album, The Balladeer (recorded at the Troubadour), which included his song "Greenback Dollar". It became a 1963 hit for the Kingston Trio.

Axton was backed by The Chambers Brothers for his Thunder'n Lightnin' album, released on Horizon Records in 1963. It was reviewed by Billboard in the magazine's 19 January issue. The review was positive with advice to deejays to keep a watch on it.

Axton released numerous albums throughout the 1960s and 1970s through Horizon, Vee-Jay, Capitol, A&M, MCA, and other labels, and on his own Jeremiah Records, which he founded in 1978. In the early 1970s he was the warm-up act for Three Dog Night; in the mid-1970s, he produced studio covers of his own music for John Davidson and in 1975 he produced Tales from the Ozone, an album by Commander Cody and His Lost Planet Airmen. He released many minor hits of his own, such as "Boney Fingers", "When the Morning Comes", and 1979's "Della and the Dealer". His vocal style featured his distinctive bass-baritone (which later deepened to near-bass) and use of characterization.

Axton first appeared on television in a David L. Wolper ABC production of The Story of a Folksinger (1963). He appeared on Hootenanny, hosted by Jack Linkletter, during this period. In 1965, he appeared in an episode of Bonanza in which he sang duets with Pernell Roberts. In 1966 he made his film debut in Smoky, co-starring Fess Parker. He gained fame in the 1970s and 1980s through his film roles, including those in The Black Stallion (1979), Liar's Moon (1982), Heart Like a Wheel (1983), and Gremlins (1984). His television appearances included McCloud (1976), The Bionic Woman (1976), WKRP in Cincinnati (1979), and Diff'rent Strokes (1984, 1985). In 1980, he sang the theme song for the short-lived series Flo, and guest-starred as himself in the episode titled "You Gotta Have Hoyt." Axton sang the jingle "The Ballad of Big Mac" for a 1969 McDonald's Big Mac television commercial, as well as "Head for the Mountains" in voiceovers for Busch beer in the 1980s. During this time he also did TV ads for Pizza Hut, Ford trucks, Levi's jeans, and a spot for FTD with Merlin Olsen in 1989. In 1991, Hoyt was awarded an induction to the Walk of Western Stars in Newhall, California.

Axton's most lasting contributions, however, were songs made famous by others: "Joy to the World" by Three Dog Night, "Never Been to Spain" by both Three Dog Night and Elvis Presley, "Greenback Dollar" by The Kingston Trio, "The Pusher" and "Snowblind Friend" by Steppenwolf, "No No Song" by Ringo Starr, as well as songs covered by Joan Baez, Arlo Guthrie, John Denver, Nina Simone, Waylon Jennings, Martha Reeves, Jonathan Edwards, Glen Campbell, Anne Murray, Patti Page, Harry Belafonte, David Clayton-Thomas, John Fullbright and Colter Wall. Axton sang duets with Linda Ronstadt on the songs "Lion in the Winter" and "When the Morning Comes", with Renee Armand on "Boney Fingers", and with Tanya Tucker on "You Taught Me How to Cry." His composition "Joy to the World", performed by Three Dog Night, held the number one spot on the Billboard Hot 100 chart for six straight weeks in 1971, making it the top hit of the year. Axton named his record label Jeremiah after the bullfrog mentioned in the song.

== Personal life ==
Axton was married four times; his first three marriages ended in divorce. He had five children. One of his children, Matt Axton, is a musician.

Axton struggled with cocaine addiction and several of his songs, including "The Pusher", "Snowblind Friend", and "No No Song", partly reflect his experiences with the drug. In his later years he was a proponent of medical marijuana use; he and his wife Deborah were arrested in February 1997 at their Montana home for possession of 500 g (1.1 lb) of marijuana. His wife later explained she offered Axton marijuana to relieve his pain and stress following his 1995 stroke. They were fined and received deferred sentences. Axton never fully recovered from his stroke, and he used a wheelchair for the remainder of his life.

== Death and tributes ==
Hoyt Axton died at age 61 at his home in Victor, Montana, on October 26, 1999, after suffering two heart attacks in two weeks.

On November 1, 2007, Hoyt and his mother Mae Boren Axton were inducted posthumously into the Oklahoma Music Hall of Fame in Muskogee, Oklahoma.

== Filmography ==
=== Film ===
- Smoky (1966) – Fred Denton
- The Black Stallion (1979) – Alec's father
- Skinflint: A Country Christmas Carol (1979, TV Movie) – Cyrus Flint
- Cloud Dancer (1980) – Brad's mechanic
- Liar's Moon (1982) – Cecil Duncan
- The Junkman (1982) – Himself / Cap. Gibbs / Rev. Jim Beam (voice)
- Endangered Species (1982) – Ben Morgan
- The Black Stallion Returns (1983) – Narrator (voice)
- Heart Like a Wheel (1983) – Tex Roque
- Deadline Auto Theft (1983) – Captain Gibbs
- Fred C. Dobbs Goes to Hollywood (1983)
- Gremlins (1984) – Randall Peltzer
- Woody Guthrie: Hard Travelin' (1984, Documentary) - Himself
- Act of Vengeance (1986, TV Movie) – Silous Huddleston
- Dallas: The Early Years (1986, TV Movie) – Aaron Southworth
- Retribution (1987) – Lt. Ashley
- Christmas Comes to Willow Creek (1987, TV Movie) – Al Bensinger
- Guilty of Innocence: The Lenell Geter Story (1987, TV Movie) - Charlie Hartford
- Dixie Lanes (1988) – Clarence Laidlaw
- Desperado: Avalanche at Devil's Ridge (1988, TV Movie) - Sheriff Ben Tree
- Disorganized Crime (1989) – Sheriff Henault
- We're No Angels (1989) – Father Levesque
- Buried Alive (1990, TV Movie) – Sheriff Sam Eberly
- Gypsy Angels (1990) - bit part
- Harmony Cats (1992) – Bill Stratton
- Space Case (1992) - Charlie
- Season of Change (1994) – Big Upton
- Kingfish: A Story of Huey P. Long (1995, TV Movie) – Huey P. Long, Sr.
- Number One Fan (1995) – Lt. Joe Halsey
- King Cobra (1999) – Mayor Ed Biddle

Several songs for the 1977 film Outlaw Blues were composed by Axton and sung by Peter Fonda. Axton also contributed songs for the films The Legend of Hillbilly John (1972), Buster and Billie (1974), Mitchell (1975), and The Junkman (1982).

=== Television ===
- The Story of a Folksinger (TV special, 1963) - himself
- Hootenanny (1964) – musical guest
- Bonanza (1965, Season 6, Episode 27: "Dead and Gone") – Howard Mead
- Iron Horse (1966, Season 1, Episode 4: "Right of Way Through Paradise") – Slash Birney
- I Dream of Jeannie (1966, season 2, episode 7: "Fastest Gun in the East") – Bull
- The Midnight Special (1973) - musical guest
- The Smothers Brothers Comedy Hour (1975) - musical guest
- The Hoyt Axton Country Western Boogie Woogie Gospel Rock and Roll Show (1975) – himself - NBC TV special featuring Linda Ronstadt, Arlo Guthrie, Ringo Starr and others
- The Bionic Woman (1976, season 2, episode 18: "The Road to Nashville") – Buck Buckley
- Dinah! (1976) - musical guest
- McCloud (1977, season 7, episode 44: "The Moscow Connection") – Johnny Starbuck
- Hee Haw (1977) - musical guest
- Dick Clark's Live Wednesday (1978) - musical guest
- Flying High (1978, season 1, episode 14: "Great Expectations") - himself
- Hee Haw Honeys (1979) - musical guest
- The Tonight Show Starring Johnny Carson (1979) - musical guest
- WKRP in Cincinnati (1979, season 1, episode 19: "I Do, I Do...For Now") – T.J. Watson
- Austin City Limits (1979, season 4, episode 411) - musical guest
- The Dukes of Hazzard (1981, season 3, episode 47: "Good Neighbors Duke") - himself, musical guest
- Flo (1981, weason 2, episode 26: "You Gotta Have Hoyt") - himself
- Barbara Mandrell & the Mandrell Sisters (1981, season 2) - musical guest
- Seven Brides for Seven Brothers (1982, season 1, episode 3: "Challenges" and episode 8: "Rodeo") – Cooper Johnson
- The Rousters (1983–1984) – Cactus Jack Slade
- Diff'rent Strokes (1984, season 7, episode 154: "Sam's Father", and episode 166: "A Camping We Will Go") – Wes McKinney
- Domestic Life (1984, season 1, episode 5: "Harold, Can You Spare $4,000?") – Rip Steele
- Faerie Tale Theatre (1984, Season 3, Episode 9: "Goldilocks and the Three Bears") – Forest Ranger
- Cover Up (1984, season 1, episode 3: "Death in Vogue") - John Cody
- Glitter (1985, season 1, episode 13: "The Runaway") - Christie's father
- The Steel Collar Man (1985, series pilot) - Red
- Trapper John, M.D. (1985, season 7, episode 133: "Game of Hearts: Part 1", and episode 134: "Game of Hearts: Part 2") - Jack Dearborne
- Murder, She Wrote (1988, season 5, episode 93: "Coal Miner's Slaughter") – Sheriff Tate
- Midnight Caller (1990, season 2, episode 30: "Kid Salinas") – Ralston Cash Dollar
- Growing Pains (1990, season 5, episode 118: "Where There's a Will") – Claver Jackson
- Doorways (1993, series pilot) - Jake Mitchell

In the 1980s and 1990s, Axton also contributed his distinctive voice to a number of documentary features. He served as the narrator for two documentaries about the Western States Endurance Race in 1982 and 1983, titled Desperate Dreams. In 1991, he narrated the VHS documentary Railfair '91 and the following year, he narrated The Alaska Highway: 1942-1992, produced by public television station KAKM of Anchorage and shown nationally on PBS. In the mid-1990s, Axton was chosen to host and narrate the profile series Life and Times on The Nashville Network.

== Discography ==
=== Albums ===
Year	Album	Chart positions			Label
Year	Album	US Country	US	CAN Country	Label
1962	The Balladeer	—	—	—	Horizon
1963	Greenback Dollar	—	—	—	Horizon
1963	Thunder'n Lightnin'	—	—	—	Horizon
1963	Saturday's Child	—	—	—	Horizon
1964	Hoyt Axton Explodes!	—	—	—	Vee Jay
1964	Long Old Road	—	—	—	Vee Jay
1965	Mr. Greenback Dollar Man	—	—	—	Surrey
1965	Hoyt Axton Sings Bessie Smith	—	—	—	Exodus
1969	My Griffin Is Gone	—	—	—	Columbia
1971	Joy to the World	—	—	—	Capitol
1971	Country Anthem	—	—	—	Capitol
1973	Less Than the Song	—	—	—	A&M
1974	Life Machine	21	—	—	A&M
1975	Southbound	27	188	—	A&M
1976	Fearless	26	171	—	A&M
1977	Snowblind Friend	36	—	—	MCA
1978	Road Songs	40	—	—	A&M
1978	Free Sailin'	42	—	—	MCA
1979	A Rusty Old Halo	27	—	14	Jeremiah
1980	Where Did the Money Go?	31	—	—	Jeremiah
1981	Live!	30	—	—	Jeremiah
1982	Pistol Packin' Mama	41	—	—	Jeremiah
1984	American Dreams	—	—	—	Global
1990	Spin of the Wheel	—	—	—	DPI
1996	Jeremiah Was a Bullfrog	–	–	–	Youngheart Music
1998	The A&M Years	—	—	—	A&M

=== Singles ===
Year	Single	Chart Positions					Album
Year	Single	US Country	US	CAN Country	CAN	CAN AC	Album
1963	"Greenback Dollar"	—	—	—	—	—	Greenback Dollar
1967	"San Fernando"	—	—	—	—	—	single only
1973	"Sweet Misery"	—	—	—	—	—	Less Than the Song
1974	"When the Morning Comes" (with Linda Ronstadt)	10	54	1	72	20	Life Machine
1974	"Boney Fingers" (with Renee Armand)	8	—	8	—	31	Life Machine
1975	"Nashville"	61	106	—	—	—	Southbound
1975	"Speed Trap"	—	105	—	—	—	Southbound
1975	"Lion in the Winter" (with Linda Ronstadt)	57	—	—	—	—	Southbound
1975	"In a Young Girl's Mind"	—	—	—	—	—	Southbound
1976	"Flash of Fire"	18	—	9	—	—	Fearless
1976	"Evangelina"	—	—	—	—	—	Fearless
1977	"You're the Hangnail in My Life"	57	—	42	—	—	Snowblind Friend
1977	"Little White Moon"	65	—	—	—	—	Snowblind Friend
1979	"Della and the Dealer"	17	—	—	—	—	A Rusty Old Halo
1979	"A Rusty Old Halo"	14	—	—	—	—	A Rusty Old Halo
1980	"Wild Bull Rider"	21	—	—	—	—	A Rusty Old Halo
1980	"Evangelina"	37	—	44	—	—	A Rusty Old Halo
1980	"Boozers Are Losers (When Benders Don't End)"	—	—	—	—	—	Where Did the Money Go
1980	"Where Did the Money Go"	80	—	—	—	—	Where Did the Money Go
1981	"Flo's Yellow Rose"	78	—	—	—	—	single only
1981	"The Devil"	86	—	—	—	—	Live!
1981	"(We've Got To) Win This One"	—	—	—	—	—	single only
1982	"(When You Dance) You Do Not Tango"	—	—	—	—	—	Where Did the Money Go
1982	"There Stands the Glass"	—	—	—	—	—	Pistol Packin' Mama
1982	"Pistol Packin' Mama"	—	—	—	—	—	Pistol Packin' Mama
1983	"Warm Storms and Wild Flowers"	—	—	—	—	—	Pistol Packin' Mama
1983	"If You're a Cowboy"	—	—	—	—	—	Spin of The Wheel
1991	"Oh I'm a Good Old Rebel"	—	—	—	—	—	Songs of the Civil War
1991	"Yellow Rose of Texas"	—	—	—	—	—	Songs of the Civil War

=== Music videos ===
Year	Video
1990	"Heartbreak Hotel"

Year	Video
1990	"Mountain Right"

== Selected list of songs ==
Among Axton's best-known compositions (or co-writing credits) are:

- "Greenback Dollar" - covered by the Kingston Trio, Bobby Darin, Barry McGuire, Trini Lopez, and many others
- "The Pusher" - covered by Steppenwolf on their debut album in 1968; this version was also used in the soundtrack of the 1969 film Easy Rider. Nina Simone recorded the song in 1971; also covered by Blind Melon, Isla Grant, Lee Aaron, Helix, The Flaming Lips and Slash
- "Have a Nice Day" (1971) - covered by Bing Crosby and John Davidson
- "Less Than The Song" (1972) - covered by Joan Baez, John Davidson and Patti Page
- "Lion In The Winter" (1974) - duet with Linda Ronstadt; covered by Faan Rousseau Family Band, Isla Grant and Guthrie Girls
- "Southbound" (1975) - covered by Three Dog Night and Commander Cody & His Lost Planet Airmen
- "No No Song" (1975) - became a number three hit for Ringo Starr in March 1975
- "Never Been to Spain" - covered by Three Dog Night, Waylon Jennings, Elvis Presley, Cher, Ike & Tina Turner, The Swon Brothers, and others
- "Joy to the World" - Three Dog Night hit from 1971 that spent six weeks atop the Billboard Hot 100 chart; covered by Little Richard and Matt Axton
- "Snowblind Friend" (1971) - covered by Steppenwolf, David Allan Coe, and Chestnut Station
- "Lightning Bar Blues" (1973) - covered by Commander Cody, Brownsville Station, Linda Ronstadt, Arlo Guthrie and Hanoi Rocks
- "Sweet Misery" (1974) - covered by John Denver, Martha Reeves, and Matt Axton
- "Sweet Fantasy" (1974) - covered by Glen Campbell and David Clayton-Thomas
- "Mary Makes Magic" (1973) - covered by Harry Belafonte
- "Ease Your Pain" (1971) - covered by Bobby Whitlock, Anne Murray, Glenn Yarbrough and Jackie DeShannon
- "When the Morning Comes" (1974) - duet with Linda Ronstadt
- "You Taught Me How to Cry" (1977) - duet with Tanya Tucker; covered by Matt Axton
- "Boney Fingers" (1974) - duet with Renee Armand
- "Jealous Man" (1976) - performed on WKRP in Cincinnati; covered by John Fullbright
- "Della and the Dealer" (1979) - also performed on WKRP; reached the top 20 of the Billboard country chart in the U.S. and the top 50 of the British pop chart
- "Evangelina" (1974) - co-written by Kenneth Higginbotham; covered by Arlo Guthrie, Albert Lee, Jonathan Edwards, Colter Wall and others
- "Flash of Fire" (1976) - co-written by Cathy Smith
- "Gypsy Moth" (1976) - covered by Freddie White and Nathaniel Rateliff
- "In a Young Girl's Mind" (1975) - covered by Johnny Cash
