= A Dose of Rock 'n' Roll =

- UK picture sleeve

Single by Ringo Starr

from the album Ringo's Rotogravure
- B-side: "Cryin'"
- Released: 20 September 1976 (US); 15 October 1976 (UK)
- Recorded: 1976
- Genre: Rock and roll
- Length: 3:24
- Label: Atlantic (US); Polydor (UK)
- Songwriter: Carl Groszman
- Producer: Arif Mardin

Ringo Starr singles chronology
"Goodnight Vienna" (1975)	"A Dose of Rock 'n' Roll" (1976)	"You Don't Know Me at All" (1976)

"A Dose of Rock 'n' Roll" is a song written by Carl Groszman, who at the time was signed to Ringo Starr's record label, Ring O' Records. Starr released his own recording of the song on his 1976 album Ringo's Rotogravure. Also issued as the album's lead single, it became his first hit as an Atlantic Records artist.

Released on 20 September 1976 (Note: US Atlantic 45-3361) in advance of the album in the US, the single spent nine weeks on the Billboard charts, peaking at number 26 on the Billboard Hot 100. It was released in the UK on 15 October but failed to chart there. (Note: UK Polydor 2001 694)

Record World said that it "marks a return to the goodtime, sing-along style" and that "Peter Frampton adds some spicy guitar licks."

== Personnel ==
According to authors Damian Fanelli, Bill Harry and the liner notes of Ringo's Rotogravure:

- Ringo Starr – drums, vocals
- Peter Frampton – guitar
- Jesse Ed Davis – guitar
- Danny Kortchmar – guitar
- Klaus Voormann – bass
- Jim Keltner – drums
- Dr. John – keyboards
- Randy Brecker – trumpet
- Alan Rubin – trumpet
- Michael Brecker – tenor saxophone
- George Young – tenor saxophone
- Lewis Delgatto – baritone saxophone
- Melissa Manchester – backing vocals
- Dutch Helmer – backing vocals
- Joe Bean – backing vocals
- Vini Poncia – backing vocals
