= Rob Shanahan =

American photographer and rock drummer (born 1966)

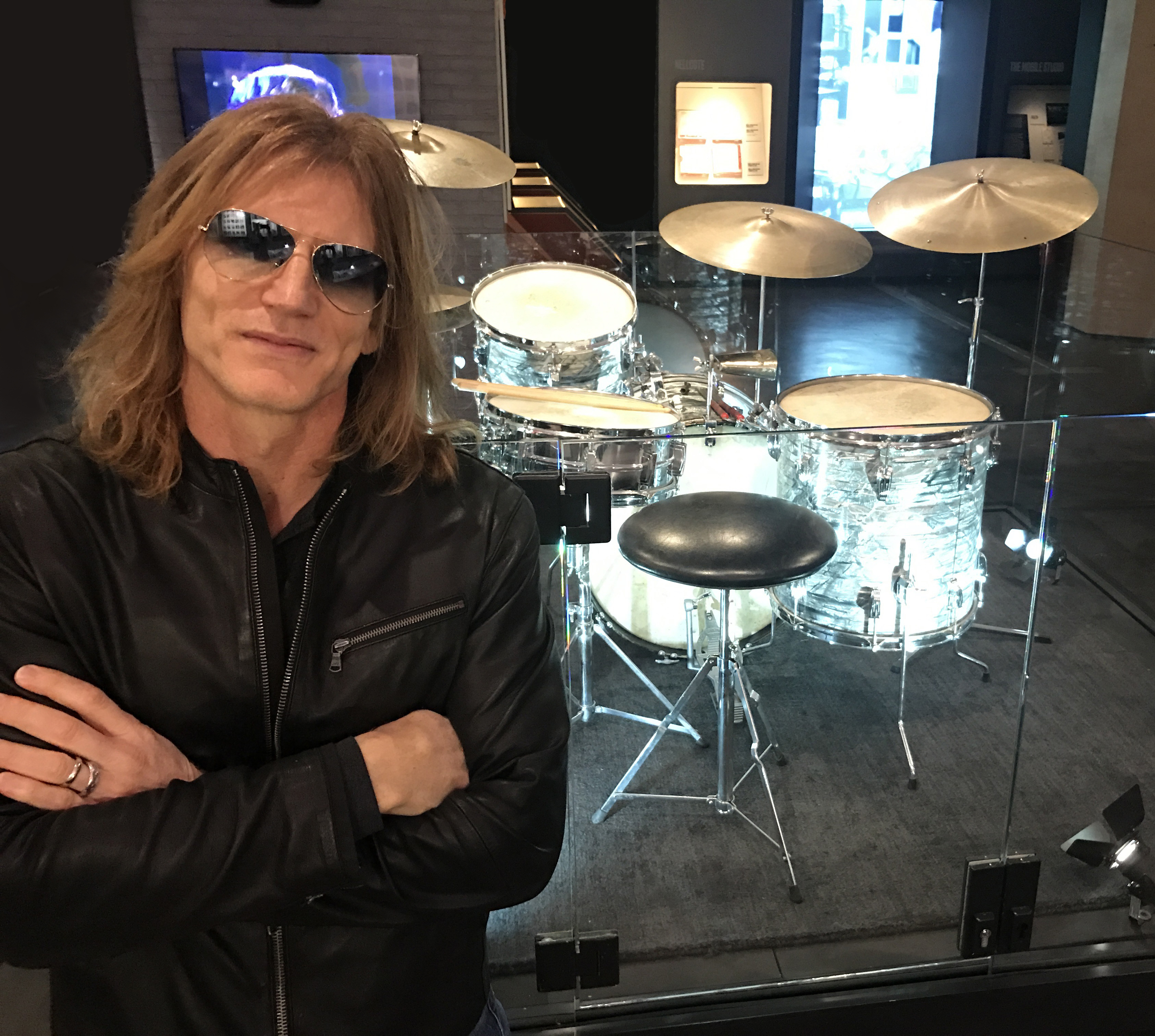
- Shanahan in 2017
- Born: May 8, 1966 (age 60); Norwood, Minnesota, U.S.
- Occupations: Photographer, drummer
- Website: www.robshanahan.com

Rob Shanahan is an American photographer and rock drummer known for his concert photography and portraits of celebrities. He has been the preferred photographer of ex-Beatles drummer Ringo Starr since 2006.

Shanahan takes many photographs of musicians for musical instrument makers, including Paiste cymbals, and drum manufacturers Yamaha and Drum Workshop. Shanahan published a book in 2011 titled Volume 1: Through the Lens of Music Photographer Rob Shanahan. Starr wrote the book's foreword.

== Early life ==
Shanahan was born on May 8, 1966, in Norwood, Minnesota. His parents, Rachel and Robert Shanahan, had four children: Rob came third. Shanahan started playing drums in grade school and continued through high school. As a teenager, he became interested in 35mm photography, using a Pentax ME camera that his mother gave to his father, but his father did not want. Shanahan attended Minnesota State University, Mankato, taking business classes. He dove deeper into camera work, too, taking aerial photographs of local farms while his friend flew the airplane, and developing the film himself in rented lab space. Shanahan was unsatisfied with the business classes, and rather than complete his graduation, he decided to drive west with his younger brother, T.J.

== Photography ==
Shanahan drove to Los Angeles in 1988 to further his career in either drumming or photography, or both. Upon arriving at the Sunset Strip, Shanahan and his brother stepped into a tattoo parlor where they saw Tommy Lee, the drummer of Mötley Crüe, getting a shoulder tattoo. Shanahan had a tough time finding work, but he eventually connected with Paul Spinelli, head of NFL Photos, who brought him into sports photography, taking pictures at NFL football games. This led to Shanahan meeting Rich Pilling, head of MLB Photos, and signing a contract to shoot major league baseball games on the West Coast. Shanahan's sports photography assignments greatly increased his practical experience in dealing with film speed, shutter speed, F-stop and luminance. Shanahan met drummer Scott Crago who played in a few bands including the Eagles and Venice, and worked as a session musician. Crago tapped Shanahan to shoot a promotional portrait of Crago for Paiste cymbals, and soon Paiste was hiring Shanahan directly, to shoot other drummers including Stewart Copeland, Abe Laboriel Jr., Alex Van Halen and Sheila E. In 2003, Shanahan became the photographer for Yamaha's Musical Instruments division which publishes the in-house All Access magazine. Shanahan shot a photo of Tommy Lee in 2005, with Lee standing behind his drums, between pillars of fire, and Drum Workshop (DW) made a poster of it, which proved popular. In 2011, DW began using him as the photographer for their Edge magazine.

On June 24, 2006, Ringo Starr & His All Starr Band played the Universal Amphitheatre. Sheila E. was in the band, and she invited Shanahan backstage to meet ex-Beatles drummer Ringo Starr. Shanahan watched the concert, including the parts where Starr stepped out front to sing, and Sheila E covered drum duties. Later that night, Starr's publicist invited Shanahan to shoot Starr on June 29, at Humphreys on Shelter Island, San Diego. There, Starr and Shanahan chatted about both being left-handed drummers, and they bonded. Starr took Shanahan on many photo shoots, including a meeting with Rolling Stones drummer Charlie Watts in 2006, which resulted in Shanahan capturing unusually relaxed and casual photographs. Shanahan said, "I was able to bust in and find the real Charlie." After this, Watts asked Shanahan to bring his camera to A Bigger Bang Tour. Starr pulled Shanahan on a 2008 tour of the UK, pointing out the sights of Liverpool, including his childhood residences, before playing the Liverpool Arena with the All Starr Band. In 2009 at USC's Galen Center, during an event promoting the video game The Beatles: Rock Band, Shanahan captured an endearing photo of Paul McCartney leaning towards Starr to kiss him, an image that was not actually used by Apple, who was paying for the session. The shot was later used in Shanahan's book.

Shanahan has been credited with photography on the artwork of many advertising campaigns, concert promotions and albums, including ones for Starr, Sheila E, Joe Bonamassa, Steve Lukather, Gary Wright, Yes and ELO. In 2011, Shanahan published a book of his photography – Volume 1: Through the Lens of Music Photographer Rob Shanahan – featuring a foreword by Starr, who obtained 30 copies of the book to give as holiday gifts. The book contains images of Keith Richards, Charlie Watts, Elton John, Eddie Van Halen, Mötley Crüe, Avril Lavigne, Billy Squier, Christina Aguilera, Joe Walsh, Sarah McLachlan, Dave Grohl, Edgar Winter, Barry Manilow, Ben Harper, Neil Peart, Godsmack, Sammy Hagar and many more. Shanahan's wife, Hillary Weiss, served as graphic designer for the book.

In 2012, Starr released the album Ringo 2012, in which all the photographs are from Shanahan. Shanahan's photographs have been exhibited in art galleries, including the Stakenborg-Greenberg Fine Art Gallery in Sarasota, Florida, the Blackboard Gallery in Camarillo, California, and the Q Art Gallery in Marina del Rey near Shanahan's home in Venice. In March 2014 when the Grammy Museum was showing "Ringo: Peace & Love", Shanahan projected an audio and video program for museum members, and talked about taking photographs of Starr. Shanahan gives motivational speeches about his photography career and his life experiences.

== Drumming ==
Shanahan is a left-handed rock drummer who plays on drum kits which are set up in the usual manner for a right-handed player. In 1994, Shanahan joined the Hollywood Stones as their drummer. The group is a Rolling Stones cover band, so Shanahan has learned to emulate the style and manner of Charlie Watts. Shanahan was featured on the cover and the centerfold of Playgirl magazine in August 1994, in a feature about the "Sexiest Rockers of 1994." Tina Savage of Playgirl took the photos.

When Ringo Starr & His All Starr Band stopped in Minnesota on May 10, 2008, to play at Mystic Lake Casino Hotel south of Minneapolis, Shanahan's friends and family attended the concert. Starr brought Shanahan onstage to play his drum kit for a few songs at the end of the concert while Starr took center stage to sing. Shanahan said this experience, backing Starr on drums, and sharing the stage with bandmembers Billy Squier, Edgar Winter, Gary Wright, Colin Hay, Hamish Stuart and Gregg Bissonette, "was a dream come true!"

== Personal life ==
Shanahan is married to Hillary Weiss, a graphic designer, and they have one daughter. The family lives in Venice, California. Shanahan drives a vintage 1956 Chevrolet, which served as the conversation starter with Rush drummer Neil Peart in 2005. Before submitting to a photo shoot, Peart wanted to talk cars, as his own vintage 1969 Jaguar was parked next to Shanahan's Chevy.
