= When the Morning Comes (song) =

Single by Hoyt Axton

from the album Life Machine
- B-side: "Billie's Theme"
- Released: February 1974
- Recorded: Fall 1973
- Genre: Country
- Length: 3:31
- Label: A&M 1497
- Songwriter(s): Hoyt Axton
- Producer(s): Allan McDougall, Hoyt Axton

Hoyt Axton singles chronology
"Sweet Misery" (1973)	"When the Morning Comes" (1974)	"Boney Fingers" (1974)

"When the Morning Comes" is a song by American country music artist Hoyt Axton. Released in February 1974, it was the first single from his album Life Machine.

The song, which featured a brief solo by Linda Ronstadt (who also provided harmony vocals), peaked at No. 10 on the Billboard Hot Country Singles chart. It also reached No. 1 on the RPM Country Tracks chart in Canada.

== Chart performance ==
Chart (1974)	Peak position
U.S. Billboard Hot Country Singles	10
U.S. Billboard Hot 100	54
U.S. Billboard Adult Contemporary	31
Canadian RPM Country Tracks	1
Canadian RPM Top Singles	72
Canadian RPM Adult Contemporary	20
