= Ringo's Rotogravure =

Studio album by Ringo Starr
- Released: 17 September 1976
- Recorded: April–July 1976
- Studios: Sunset Sound (Hollywood); Cherokee (Hollywood)
- Genres: Rock; soul
- Length: 34:23
- Labels: Polydor (UK); Atlantic (US)
- Producer: Arif Mardin

Ringo Starr chronology
Blast from Your Past (1975)	Ringo's Rotogravure (1976)	Ringo the 4th (1977)

Singles from Ringo's Rotogravure
- 1. "A Dose of Rock 'n' Roll" Released: 20 September 1976 (US); 15 October 1976 (UK); 2. "You Don't Know Me at All" Released: 15 October 1976 (Europe only, except UK); 3. "Hey! Baby" Released: 22 November 1976 (US); 26 November 1976 (UK); 4. "Las Brisas" Released: 1976 (Mexico only)

Ringo's Rotogravure is the fifth studio album by the English musician Ringo Starr, released on 17 September 1976. It was the last project to feature active involvement from all four former Beatles before John Lennon's murder in 1980, and the second of two projects following the band's 1970 breakup to hold the distinction (alongside Ringo from 1973). Following the end of his contract with EMI, Starr signed on with Polydor Records worldwide (Atlantic Records handling US distribution).

Upon release, Ringo's Rotogravure proved less successful than its two predecessors, reaching number 28 in the US (Starr's final top 40 placement there) and failing to chart in the UK. Its first single, "A Dose of Rock 'n' Roll" reached the top 40 in the US, while the second single, "Hey! Baby", stalled in the lower reaches of the chart. The album's reception signaled the beginning of Starr's commercial decline after a string of hit albums and singles throughout the early 1970s.

== Background and recording ==
It was reported in December 1975 that ABC Records in the US was to sign former Beatle Ringo Starr for a 5-year recording contract, worth $5 million. However, on 26 January 1976, when Starr's recording contract with EMI ended, he signed with Atlantic for the US and Polydor for the UK, on 10 March. As stated in the deal, Starr was expected to release 7 albums within 5 years, with the first album planned for release in June. Starr's original intention was to have Richard Perry produce the album, before he had switched labels. Starr thought "since we were trying another label, we'd try another producer." It had been suggested by Atlantic to Starr that he work with Arif Mardin, who was the in-house producer for the label at the time. Mardin met up with Starr in London to see what they were like together and, pleased with the encounter, Mardin told Starr he would be happy to work with him. Starr's intention was to work in Los Angeles as his friends were there.

Well, Paul asked to write a song. I asked John and ... eventually he came up with ["Cookin'"] ... I also asked George to write one, but there was an old one of his that was never released by anybody, that I always loved ... It's called "I Still Love You", a big ballady thing.

— Ringo Starr on how he got material from his former Beatles bandmates

Starr again stuck to his proven formula of having friends write songs and perform on the recordings. This time, Eric Clapton took part, in addition to his old friend Harry Nilsson, and Peter Frampton, Jesse Ed Davis, Melissa Manchester, Dr. John, and former Beatles John Lennon, Paul McCartney and George Harrison. Sessions began in April at Sunset Sound Recorders in Los Angeles, and eventually moved on 12 June to Cherokee Recording Studios. Starr was joined at this session by Lennon and his wife Yoko Ono, recording the Lennon-penned "Cookin' (In the Kitchen of Love)". Lennon played the piano lines that are heard at the beginning of the song, in what was his only known studio recording during his five years of musical retreat that he kept until 1980, when he recorded his album Double Fantasy.

McCartney, while on break from his Wings Over America tour with Wings, made the backing track to "Pure Gold" along with his wife Linda McCartney, which Starr sang over, on 19 June. McCartney originally wrote "Let 'Em In" for Starr before deciding to record it himself. Harrison donated a song too, but because of his commitments to get his album Thirty Three & 1/3 (1976) done on schedule, he was unable to partake in any recording for Ringo's Rotogravure. Harrison's contribution was a song previously known as "When Every Song Is Sung", which he had attempted to record first with Ronnie Spector in 1971, then with Cilla Black (on which Starr also played), and later still with Leon Russell's wife Mary. Eric Clapton played guitar on the track "This Be Called a Song". Several unreleased tracks were recorded during the sessions: "Where Are You Going", (Note: "Where Are You Going" was one of two songs that was co-written between Starr and Billy Lawrie in the early 1970s. The other was "Rock & Roller", a track that would be recorded by Lawrie at Starr's Startling Studios in May 1973 for his album, Ship Imagination (1973).) "All Right", "It's Hard to Be Lovers" and a track Starr co-wrote with Nilsson, "Party".

== Music and lyrics ==
"Pure Gold", composed by Paul McCartney, had been influenced by Starr's then-girlfriend Nancy Andrews. "Cookin' (In the Kitchen of Love)" was written specifically for Starr by John Lennon. "Las Brisas", a track co-written between Starr and Andrews in Mexico, features Mariachi Los Galleros de Pedro Rey with Starr on maracas. Starr claimed that he had "looked around all these Mexican restaurants and found this band who were sensational." "Lady Gaye" was based on Clifford T. Ward's "Birmingham" (from Ward's 1975 album No More Rock 'N' Roll), which in turn gave him co-credit on the Starkey–Poncia composition. "Spooky Weirdness" is an ad-libbed piece that closes the album.

== Release ==
Professional ratings
Review scores
Source	Rating
AllMusic	2.5/5 stars
Christgau's Record Guide	C
The Encyclopedia of Popular Music	2/5 stars
The Essential Rock Discography	5/10
MusicHound	2/5
The Rolling Stone Album Guide	2/5 stars

Ringo's Rotogravure was released on 17 September 1976 in the UK, (Note: UK Polydor Deluxe 2302 040) to a lukewarm response. Despite letting him record the song, Harrison was not pleased with Starr's version of "I'll Still Love You", and proceeded to take legal action against Starr, which was soon settled out of court. The album's title came from the film Easter Parade (1948). At the time living as a UK tax exile, Starr promoted the album with interviews in Denmark, France and Italy. The album was packaged with a free magnifying glass so that those who bought the album could read the graffiti that was featured on the album's back cover. The "A Dose of Rock 'n' Roll" single, backed with "Cryin'", was released on 20 September in the US, reaching number 26. (Note: US Atlantic 45-3361)

Released in the US on 27 September, (Note: US Atlantic SD 18193) the album performed poorly, only reaching number 28 in America and quickly falling off the charts, while it never even appeared in the UK charts. The promotional film for "You Don't Know Me at All" aired on Dutch TV, in the Netherlands, on the show Voor De Vuist Weg. On 15 October the "A Dose of Rock 'n' Roll" single was released in the UK. (Note: UK Polydor 2001 694) In between this and the next single, Starr recorded the track "I Can Hear You Calling" at Atlantic Studios on 15 October. The follow-up single, his cover of Bruce Channel's "Hey! Baby", backed with "Lady Gaye", was released on 22 November in the US and stalled at number 74. (Note: US Atlantic 45-3371) The single was released in the UK on 26 November. (Note: UK Polydor 2001 699) A single comprising "Las Brisas" and "Cryin'" was released in Mexico. Ringo's Rotogravure was issued on CD, on the same day as Ringo the 4th, on 16 August 1992, in the US by Atlantic. (Note: US Atlantic 7 82416-2P)

== Track listing ==
Side one
No.	Title	Writer(s)	Length
1.	"A Dose of Rock 'n' Roll"	Carl Groszmann	3:24
2.	"Hey! Baby"	Margaret Cobb, Bruce Channel	3:11
3.	"Pure Gold"	Paul McCartney	3:14
4.	"Cryin'"	Richard Starkey; Vini Poncia	3:18
5.	"You Don't Know Me at All"	Dave Jordan	3:16

Side two
No.	Title	Writer(s)	Length
1.	"Cookin' (In the Kitchen of Love)"	John Lennon	3:41
2.	"I'll Still Love You"	George Harrison	2:57
3.	"This Be Called a Song"	Eric Clapton	3:14
4.	"Las Brisas"	Starkey; Nancy Andrews	3:33
5.	"Lady Gaye"	Starkey; Poncia; Clifford T. Ward	2:57
6.	"Spooky Weirdness"	uncredited	1:26

== Personnel ==
- Ringo Starr – lead vocals, drums, percussion
- Peter Frampton – guitar
- Jesse Ed Davis – guitar
- Lon Van Eaton – guitar
- Eric Clapton – guitar on "This Be Called a Song"
- Danny Kortchmar – guitar
- John Lennon – piano on "Cookin' (In the Kitchen of Love)"
- Dr. John – keyboards
- Jane Getz – keyboards
- Jim Keltner – drums
- Will Lee, Klaus Voormann – bass guitar
- Paul McCartney – backing vocals on "Pure Gold"
- Linda McCartney – backing vocals on "Pure Gold"
- Melissa Manchester – backing vocals
- Harry Nilsson – backing vocals
- David Lasley – backing vocals
- Mariachi Los Galleros de Pedro Rey – instruments and backing vocals on "Las Brisas"
- John Kosh – Art director and album cover designer

== Charts ==
Chart (1976)	Peak position
Australian Albums (Kent Music Report)	19
Austrian Albums (Ö3 Austria)	10
Canada Top Albums/CDs (RPM)	35
Dutch Albums (Album Top 100)	16
Italian Albums (Musica e Dischi)	11
Japanese Albums (Oricon)	18
New Zealand Albums (RMNZ)	21
Norwegian Albums (VG-lista)	14
Swedish Albums (Sverigetopplistan)	19
US Billboard 200	28
