= Nancy Lee Andrews =

American model and photographer (born 1947)

Nancy Lee Andrews is a former international model turned photographer who is based in Nashville.

== Photography ==
She published a collection of her photography, A Dose of Rock 'n' Roll, in 2008.

== Personal life ==
Andrews was in a relationship with Ringo Starr (whom she met through John Lennon) from 1974 to 1980, and they were engaged. After they broke up, she sued him for palimony.
