= List of minor planets: 733001–734000 =

The following is a partial list of minor planets, running from minor-planet number 733001 through 734000, inclusive. The primary data for this and other partial lists is based on JPL's "Small-Body Orbital Elements" and data available from the Minor Planet Center. Critical list information is also provided by the MPC, unless otherwise specified from Lowell Observatory. A detailed description of the table's columns and additional sources are given on the main page including a complete list of every page in this series, and a statistical break-up on the dynamical classification of minor planets.

Also see the summary list of all named bodies in numerical and alphabetical order, and the corresponding naming citations for the number range of this particular list. New namings may only be added to this list after official publication, as the preannouncement of names is condemned by the Working Group for Small Bodies Nomenclature of the International Astronomical Union.

Near-Earth obj.	MBA (inner)	MBA (outer)	Centaur
Mars-crosser	MBA (middle)	Jupiter trojan	Trans-Neptunian obj.
Unclassified

== 733001–733100 ==
Designation			Discovery			Properties		Ref
Permanent	Provisional	Named after	Date	Site	Discoverer(s)	Category	Diam.	Ref
733001	2014 OF_{166}	—	September 8, 2010	Kitt Peak	Spacewatch	·	1.5 km	MPC · JPL
733002	2014 OO_{168}	—	July 27, 2014	Haleakala	Pan-STARRS 1	·	2.3 km	MPC · JPL
733003	2014 OB_{171}	—	July 27, 2014	Haleakala	Pan-STARRS 1	·	1.5 km	MPC · JPL
733004	2014 OJ_{171}	—	October 6, 2008	Kitt Peak	Spacewatch	·	560 m	MPC · JPL
733005	2014 OK_{172}	—	August 25, 2003	Palomar	NEAT	·	3.7 km	MPC · JPL
733006	2014 OE_{176}	—	July 27, 2014	Haleakala	Pan-STARRS 1	·	1.0 km	MPC · JPL
733007	2014 OA_{177}	—	March 18, 2004	Palomar	NEAT	·	1.8 km	MPC · JPL
733008	2014 OE_{181}	—	May 18, 2010	WISE	WISE	·	920 m	MPC · JPL
733009	2014 OK_{181}	—	May 17, 2010	WISE	WISE	·	1.2 km	MPC · JPL
733010	2014 OR_{181}	—	May 6, 2002	Palomar	NEAT	·	1.7 km	MPC · JPL
733011	2014 OL_{186}	—	September 14, 2005	Kitt Peak	Spacewatch	AGN	980 m	MPC · JPL
733012	2014 OJ_{189}	—	July 27, 2014	Haleakala	Pan-STARRS 1	·	2.1 km	MPC · JPL
733013	2014 OC_{192}	—	October 24, 2011	Mount Lemmon	Mount Lemmon Survey	·	650 m	MPC · JPL
733014	2014 OZ_{193}	—	October 4, 2004	Kitt Peak	Spacewatch	·	660 m	MPC · JPL
733015	2014 OE_{194}	—	November 3, 2005	Mount Lemmon	Mount Lemmon Survey	·	1.5 km	MPC · JPL
733016	2014 OV_{195}	—	July 26, 2005	Palomar	NEAT	ADE	1.9 km	MPC · JPL
733017	2014 OB_{199}	—	October 26, 2009	Mount Lemmon	Mount Lemmon Survey	·	2.4 km	MPC · JPL
733018	2014 OY_{201}	—	January 18, 2012	Kitt Peak	Spacewatch	EOS	1.4 km	MPC · JPL
733019	2014 ON_{208}	—	October 1, 2010	Mount Lemmon	Mount Lemmon Survey	WIT	770 m	MPC · JPL
733020	2014 OS_{209}	—	July 25, 2014	Haleakala	Pan-STARRS 1	KOR	920 m	MPC · JPL
733021	2014 OL_{210}	—	July 7, 2005	Mauna Kea	Veillet, C.	·	1.6 km	MPC · JPL
733022	2014 OU_{213}	—	October 5, 2010	Moletai	K. Černis	AGN	970 m	MPC · JPL
733023	2014 OM_{216}	—	April 2, 2009	Kitt Peak	Spacewatch	·	1.1 km	MPC · JPL
733024	2014 OV_{220}	—	January 10, 2008	Mount Lemmon	Mount Lemmon Survey	·	1.7 km	MPC · JPL
733025	2014 OY_{221}	—	January 13, 2011	Mount Lemmon	Mount Lemmon Survey	·	2.9 km	MPC · JPL
733026	2014 OJ_{226}	—	April 12, 2010	Mount Lemmon	Mount Lemmon Survey	·	690 m	MPC · JPL
733027	2014 OX_{230}	—	February 29, 2008	Kitt Peak	Spacewatch	GAL	1.7 km	MPC · JPL
733028	2014 OO_{233}	—	April 10, 2013	Haleakala	Pan-STARRS 1	·	1.3 km	MPC · JPL
733029	2014 OK_{234}	—	June 27, 2014	Haleakala	Pan-STARRS 1	PAD	1.3 km	MPC · JPL
733030	2014 OQ_{235}	—	October 10, 2002	Apache Point	SDSS Collaboration	·	2.0 km	MPC · JPL
733031	2014 OP_{236}	—	July 6, 2010	WISE	WISE	(7605)	3.4 km	MPC · JPL
733032	2014 OZ_{236}	—	February 2, 2009	Catalina	CSS	·	1.5 km	MPC · JPL
733033	2014 OL_{239}	—	March 31, 2008	Kitt Peak	Spacewatch	·	1.4 km	MPC · JPL
733034	2014 OX_{244}	—	October 16, 2009	Mount Lemmon	Mount Lemmon Survey	HYG	2.5 km	MPC · JPL
733035	2014 OA_{251}	—	October 23, 2001	Palomar	NEAT	·	3.1 km	MPC · JPL
733036	2014 OG_{254}	—	September 10, 2010	Kitt Peak	Spacewatch	·	1.7 km	MPC · JPL
733037	2014 ON_{254}	—	June 15, 2010	WISE	WISE	·	1.7 km	MPC · JPL
733038	2014 OQ_{254}	—	July 29, 2014	Haleakala	Pan-STARRS 1	·	1.2 km	MPC · JPL
733039	2014 OY_{255}	—	July 29, 2014	Haleakala	Pan-STARRS 1	·	1.4 km	MPC · JPL
733040	2014 OA_{256}	—	July 20, 2010	WISE	WISE	·	1.8 km	MPC · JPL
733041	2014 OD_{257}	—	March 6, 2008	Mount Lemmon	Mount Lemmon Survey	·	1.6 km	MPC · JPL
733042	2014 OT_{257}	—	August 8, 2010	WISE	WISE	·	1.8 km	MPC · JPL
733043	2014 ON_{261}	—	September 13, 2005	Kitt Peak	Spacewatch	·	1.6 km	MPC · JPL
733044	2014 OC_{263}	—	June 27, 2014	Haleakala	Pan-STARRS 1	EOS	1.4 km	MPC · JPL
733045	2014 OS_{265}	—	January 1, 2008	Kitt Peak	Spacewatch	MAR	970 m	MPC · JPL
733046	2014 OD_{267}	—	July 20, 2010	WISE	WISE	·	2.2 km	MPC · JPL
733047	2014 OH_{268}	—	November 6, 2010	Mount Lemmon	Mount Lemmon Survey	·	1.7 km	MPC · JPL
733048	2014 OV_{270}	—	October 15, 2009	Catalina	CSS	·	3.2 km	MPC · JPL
733049	2014 OO_{271}	—	March 13, 2012	Mount Lemmon	Mount Lemmon Survey	·	2.2 km	MPC · JPL
733050	2014 OX_{274}	—	July 29, 2014	Haleakala	Pan-STARRS 1	·	1.3 km	MPC · JPL
733051	2014 OY_{279}	—	December 26, 2006	Kitt Peak	Spacewatch	·	1.6 km	MPC · JPL
733052	2014 OV_{280}	—	September 17, 2010	Mount Lemmon	Mount Lemmon Survey	·	1.6 km	MPC · JPL
733053	2014 OU_{281}	—	September 24, 2004	Kitt Peak	Spacewatch	EOS	1.4 km	MPC · JPL
733054	2014 OA_{285}	—	July 8, 2014	Haleakala	Pan-STARRS 1	·	3.1 km	MPC · JPL
733055	2014 OK_{293}	—	April 4, 2010	WISE	WISE	THB	2.5 km	MPC · JPL
733056	2014 OQ_{298}	—	July 24, 2010	WISE	WISE	KON	1.7 km	MPC · JPL
733057	2014 OO_{299}	—	December 25, 2005	Kitt Peak	Spacewatch	·	1.8 km	MPC · JPL
733058	2014 OZ_{309}	—	July 27, 2014	Haleakala	Pan-STARRS 1	HOF	1.8 km	MPC · JPL
733059	2014 OB_{312}	—	July 27, 2014	Haleakala	Pan-STARRS 1	·	1.5 km	MPC · JPL
733060	2014 ON_{319}	—	July 29, 2014	Haleakala	Pan-STARRS 1	·	1.7 km	MPC · JPL
733061	2014 OS_{322}	—	August 13, 2010	Kitt Peak	Spacewatch	·	1.2 km	MPC · JPL
733062	2014 OL_{323}	—	July 27, 2010	WISE	WISE	·	2.7 km	MPC · JPL
733063	2014 OC_{326}	—	February 14, 2007	Mauna Kea	P. A. Wiegert	·	1.5 km	MPC · JPL
733064	2014 OO_{328}	—	June 29, 2014	Haleakala	Pan-STARRS 1	·	1.5 km	MPC · JPL
733065	2014 OR_{328}	—	September 8, 2011	Haleakala	Pan-STARRS 1	·	410 m	MPC · JPL
733066	2014 OQ_{332}	—	April 14, 2008	Mount Lemmon	Mount Lemmon Survey	·	1.4 km	MPC · JPL
733067	2014 OZ_{335}	—	July 30, 2014	Haleakala	Pan-STARRS 1	·	520 m	MPC · JPL
733068	2014 OF_{341}	—	October 8, 2005	Kitt Peak	Spacewatch	·	1.4 km	MPC · JPL
733069	2014 OK_{344}	—	March 31, 2003	Palomar	NEAT	·	1.3 km	MPC · JPL
733070	2014 OT_{346}	—	September 19, 2006	Kitt Peak	Spacewatch	·	1.1 km	MPC · JPL
733071	2014 OU_{346}	—	July 28, 2014	Haleakala	Pan-STARRS 1	·	1.5 km	MPC · JPL
733072	2014 OX_{358}	—	July 7, 2014	Haleakala	Pan-STARRS 1	·	1.3 km	MPC · JPL
733073	2014 OX_{359}	—	July 28, 2014	Haleakala	Pan-STARRS 1	·	990 m	MPC · JPL
733074	2014 OT_{360}	—	December 3, 2010	Mount Lemmon	Mount Lemmon Survey	·	1.4 km	MPC · JPL
733075	2014 OU_{363}	—	October 11, 2005	Kitt Peak	Spacewatch	KOR	910 m	MPC · JPL
733076	2014 OZ_{366}	—	November 12, 2010	Kitt Peak	Spacewatch	KOR	1.2 km	MPC · JPL
733077	2014 ON_{369}	—	July 25, 2014	Haleakala	Pan-STARRS 1	KOR	940 m	MPC · JPL
733078	2014 OB_{375}	—	January 26, 2003	Haleakala	NEAT	·	3.1 km	MPC · JPL
733079	2014 OQ_{376}	—	September 19, 1998	Apache Point	SDSS	·	1.1 km	MPC · JPL
733080	2014 OL_{378}	—	February 1, 2010	WISE	WISE	T_{j} (2.98) · EUP	3.6 km	MPC · JPL
733081	2014 OV_{382}	—	August 1, 2001	Palomar	NEAT	·	870 m	MPC · JPL
733082	2014 OO_{387}	—	July 28, 2014	Haleakala	Pan-STARRS 1	GEF	1.1 km	MPC · JPL
733083	2014 OW_{390}	—	March 11, 1992	Kitt Peak	Spacewatch	·	1.8 km	MPC · JPL
733084	2014 OE_{393}	—	November 19, 2009	Catalina	CSS	LUT	5.1 km	MPC · JPL
733085	2014 OM_{393}	—	September 27, 2005	Palomar	NEAT	·	1.6 km	MPC · JPL
733086 Virgiliupop	2014 OZ_{398}	Virgiliupop	February 27, 2012	Roque de los Muchachos	EURONEAR	KOR	910 m	MPC · JPL
733087	2014 OV_{399}	—	July 27, 2014	Haleakala	Pan-STARRS 1	·	2.1 km	MPC · JPL
733088	2014 OY_{399}	—	September 30, 2009	Mount Lemmon	Mount Lemmon Survey	·	1.6 km	MPC · JPL
733089	2014 OM_{401}	—	March 8, 2008	Mount Lemmon	Mount Lemmon Survey	·	1.5 km	MPC · JPL
733090	2014 OB_{402}	—	February 9, 2010	WISE	WISE	·	4.7 km	MPC · JPL
733091	2014 OG_{403}	—	July 31, 2014	Haleakala	Pan-STARRS 1	·	1.9 km	MPC · JPL
733092	2014 OO_{404}	—	August 29, 2009	Kitt Peak	Spacewatch	·	1.7 km	MPC · JPL
733093	2014 OM_{405}	—	July 25, 2014	Haleakala	Pan-STARRS 1	KOR	1.0 km	MPC · JPL
733094	2014 OU_{405}	—	September 10, 2010	Kitt Peak	Spacewatch	·	1.5 km	MPC · JPL
733095	2014 OM_{406}	—	August 8, 2005	Cerro Tololo	Deep Ecliptic Survey	·	1.4 km	MPC · JPL
733096	2014 OR_{406}	—	July 25, 2014	Haleakala	Pan-STARRS 1	·	1.6 km	MPC · JPL
733097	2014 OF_{407}	—	February 25, 2007	Kitt Peak	Spacewatch	NAE	1.7 km	MPC · JPL
733098	2014 OL_{407}	—	July 25, 2014	Haleakala	Pan-STARRS 1	KOR	1.0 km	MPC · JPL
733099	2014 OW_{408}	—	July 25, 2014	Haleakala	Pan-STARRS 1	EOS	1.4 km	MPC · JPL
733100	2014 ON_{409}	—	July 25, 2014	Haleakala	Pan-STARRS 1	·	1.4 km	MPC · JPL

== 733101–733200 ==
back to top

Designation			Discovery			Properties		Ref
Permanent	Provisional	Named after	Date	Site	Discoverer(s)	Category	Diam.	Ref
733101	2014 OM_{410}	—	March 24, 2009	Kitt Peak	Spacewatch	·	1.4 km	MPC · JPL
733102	2014 OE_{411}	—	February 8, 2013	Haleakala	Pan-STARRS 1	·	1.0 km	MPC · JPL
733103	2014 OG_{412}	—	April 15, 2013	Haleakala	Pan-STARRS 1	·	1.7 km	MPC · JPL
733104	2014 OD_{413}	—	July 30, 2014	Kitt Peak	Spacewatch	PAD	1.3 km	MPC · JPL
733105	2014 OE_{413}	—	July 30, 2014	Kitt Peak	Spacewatch	EOS	1.5 km	MPC · JPL
733106	2014 OH_{413}	—	July 30, 2014	Kitt Peak	Spacewatch	·	1.4 km	MPC · JPL
733107	2014 OL_{413}	—	October 11, 2010	Mount Lemmon	Mount Lemmon Survey	·	1.5 km	MPC · JPL
733108	2014 OR_{417}	—	July 25, 2014	Haleakala	Pan-STARRS 1	·	2.0 km	MPC · JPL
733109	2014 OG_{432}	—	July 25, 2014	Haleakala	Pan-STARRS 1	·	1.2 km	MPC · JPL
733110	2014 OJ_{434}	—	July 25, 2014	Haleakala	Pan-STARRS 1	·	540 m	MPC · JPL
733111	2014 OK_{437}	—	July 29, 2014	Haleakala	Pan-STARRS 1	·	1.4 km	MPC · JPL
733112	2014 OL_{446}	—	July 28, 2014	Haleakala	Pan-STARRS 1	·	480 m	MPC · JPL
733113	2014 OV_{451}	—	April 6, 2013	Mount Lemmon	Mount Lemmon Survey	·	1.3 km	MPC · JPL
733114	2014 OU_{457}	—	September 10, 2007	Mount Lemmon	Mount Lemmon Survey	·	780 m	MPC · JPL
733115	2014 OQ_{463}	—	July 29, 2014	Haleakala	Pan-STARRS 1	·	1.6 km	MPC · JPL
733116	2014 PE_{10}	—	November 10, 2010	Mount Lemmon	Mount Lemmon Survey	·	1.4 km	MPC · JPL
733117	2014 PP_{13}	—	July 25, 2014	Haleakala	Pan-STARRS 1	·	510 m	MPC · JPL
733118	2014 PM_{15}	—	March 9, 2007	Mount Lemmon	Mount Lemmon Survey	·	510 m	MPC · JPL
733119	2014 PP_{15}	—	January 22, 2010	WISE	WISE	LUT	3.3 km	MPC · JPL
733120	2014 PP_{18}	—	November 12, 2010	Mount Lemmon	Mount Lemmon Survey	·	1.5 km	MPC · JPL
733121	2014 PP_{20}	—	September 30, 2005	Junk Bond	D. Healy	AGN	1.1 km	MPC · JPL
733122	2014 PA_{22}	—	October 25, 2001	Apache Point	SDSS Collaboration	·	3.0 km	MPC · JPL
733123	2014 PE_{23}	—	July 25, 2014	Haleakala	Pan-STARRS 1	EOS	1.4 km	MPC · JPL
733124	2014 PR_{26}	—	October 29, 2005	Kitt Peak	Spacewatch	·	1.6 km	MPC · JPL
733125	2014 PG_{27}	—	October 12, 2010	Mount Lemmon	Mount Lemmon Survey	·	1.6 km	MPC · JPL
733126	2014 PQ_{27}	—	August 4, 2014	Haleakala	Pan-STARRS 1	KOR	1.1 km	MPC · JPL
733127	2014 PS_{27}	—	August 4, 2014	Haleakala	Pan-STARRS 1	·	1.3 km	MPC · JPL
733128	2014 PZ_{27}	—	August 4, 2014	Haleakala	Pan-STARRS 1	·	500 m	MPC · JPL
733129	2014 PE_{31}	—	July 30, 2014	Kitt Peak	Spacewatch	·	1.8 km	MPC · JPL
733130	2014 PM_{31}	—	December 2, 2005	Mauna Kea	A. Boattini	·	2.8 km	MPC · JPL
733131	2014 PN_{35}	—	August 23, 2001	Kitt Peak	Spacewatch	·	1.2 km	MPC · JPL
733132	2014 PW_{36}	—	August 27, 2009	Kitt Peak	Spacewatch	·	2.9 km	MPC · JPL
733133	2014 PA_{38}	—	March 15, 2008	Mount Lemmon	Mount Lemmon Survey	·	1.7 km	MPC · JPL
733134	2014 PR_{38}	—	September 29, 2009	Mount Lemmon	Mount Lemmon Survey	LIX	3.0 km	MPC · JPL
733135	2014 PV_{40}	—	March 11, 2005	Mount Lemmon	Mount Lemmon Survey	NYS	1.1 km	MPC · JPL
733136	2014 PS_{41}	—	September 19, 2009	Kitt Peak	Spacewatch	·	2.6 km	MPC · JPL
733137	2014 PG_{43}	—	October 27, 2009	La Sagra	OAM	·	3.0 km	MPC · JPL
733138	2014 PY_{43}	—	February 25, 2010	WISE	WISE	·	3.2 km	MPC · JPL
733139	2014 PG_{47}	—	September 21, 1995	Kitt Peak	Spacewatch	·	1.2 km	MPC · JPL
733140	2014 PD_{49}	—	May 12, 2013	Haleakala	Pan-STARRS 1	·	1.6 km	MPC · JPL
733141	2014 PN_{51}	—	July 28, 2014	Haleakala	Pan-STARRS 1	·	2.5 km	MPC · JPL
733142	2014 PK_{53}	—	October 19, 2010	Mount Lemmon	Mount Lemmon Survey	·	1.5 km	MPC · JPL
733143	2014 PA_{54}	—	March 23, 2013	Mount Lemmon	Mount Lemmon Survey	BRA	1.3 km	MPC · JPL
733144	2014 PS_{55}	—	July 7, 2014	Haleakala	Pan-STARRS 1	BRA	1.2 km	MPC · JPL
733145	2014 PU_{55}	—	October 24, 2003	Goodricke-Pigott	R. A. Tucker	·	3.3 km	MPC · JPL
733146	2014 PP_{56}	—	September 16, 2001	Socorro	LINEAR	·	600 m	MPC · JPL
733147	2014 PR_{56}	—	January 5, 2012	Haleakala	Pan-STARRS 1	BRA	1.5 km	MPC · JPL
733148	2014 PC_{57}	—	January 29, 2003	Apache Point	SDSS Collaboration	·	1.7 km	MPC · JPL
733149	2014 PM_{60}	—	May 8, 2008	Mount Lemmon	Mount Lemmon Survey	·	3.8 km	MPC · JPL
733150	2014 PN_{60}	—	November 19, 2006	Kitt Peak	Spacewatch	·	2.0 km	MPC · JPL
733151	2014 PV_{60}	—	February 25, 2007	Mount Lemmon	Mount Lemmon Survey	·	2.9 km	MPC · JPL
733152	2014 PW_{61}	—	February 8, 2013	Haleakala	Pan-STARRS 1	EUN	1.1 km	MPC · JPL
733153	2014 PJ_{68}	—	October 25, 2011	Haleakala	Pan-STARRS 1	·	1.4 km	MPC · JPL
733154	2014 PS_{68}	—	March 26, 2006	Mount Lemmon	Mount Lemmon Survey	·	2.3 km	MPC · JPL
733155	2014 PT_{69}	—	September 30, 1998	Kitt Peak	Spacewatch	·	640 m	MPC · JPL
733156	2014 PE_{72}	—	November 2, 2010	Mount Lemmon	Mount Lemmon Survey	·	1.5 km	MPC · JPL
733157	2014 PY_{74}	—	August 14, 2004	Cerro Tololo	Deep Ecliptic Survey	·	1.5 km	MPC · JPL
733158	2014 PU_{75}	—	August 3, 2014	Haleakala	Pan-STARRS 1	·	1.5 km	MPC · JPL
733159	2014 PD_{76}	—	November 2, 2010	Mount Lemmon	Mount Lemmon Survey	·	1.6 km	MPC · JPL
733160	2014 PA_{78}	—	December 1, 2005	Kitt Peak	Wasserman, L. H., Millis, R. L.	·	2.5 km	MPC · JPL
733161	2014 PJ_{80}	—	March 5, 2008	Mount Lemmon	Mount Lemmon Survey	·	2.0 km	MPC · JPL
733162	2014 PT_{81}	—	March 7, 2013	Kitt Peak	Spacewatch	·	1.2 km	MPC · JPL
733163	2014 PG_{82}	—	January 10, 2008	Mount Lemmon	Mount Lemmon Survey	·	2.0 km	MPC · JPL
733164	2014 QW_{3}	—	July 10, 2010	WISE	WISE	·	1.9 km	MPC · JPL
733165	2014 QG_{5}	—	July 3, 2014	Haleakala	Pan-STARRS 1	·	1.7 km	MPC · JPL
733166	2014 QJ_{7}	—	March 19, 2013	Haleakala	Pan-STARRS 1	·	1.6 km	MPC · JPL
733167	2014 QE_{14}	—	June 30, 2014	Haleakala	Pan-STARRS 1	·	1.5 km	MPC · JPL
733168	2014 QR_{16}	—	October 13, 2010	Kitt Peak	Spacewatch	·	1.4 km	MPC · JPL
733169	2014 QX_{17}	—	November 21, 2009	Mount Lemmon	Mount Lemmon Survey	·	2.8 km	MPC · JPL
733170	2014 QB_{19}	—	January 18, 2012	Mount Lemmon	Mount Lemmon Survey	·	1.2 km	MPC · JPL
733171	2014 QM_{19}	—	January 30, 2006	Kitt Peak	Spacewatch	·	2.4 km	MPC · JPL
733172	2014 QT_{19}	—	September 20, 2003	Kitt Peak	Spacewatch	·	2.1 km	MPC · JPL
733173 Mārīteeglīte	2014 QP_{21}	Mārīteeglīte	August 6, 2008	Baldone	K. Černis, I. Eglītis	·	4.6 km	MPC · JPL
733174	2014 QV_{21}	—	September 17, 2009	Kitt Peak	Spacewatch	·	1.9 km	MPC · JPL
733175	2014 QS_{23}	—	September 30, 2009	Mount Lemmon	Mount Lemmon Survey	·	2.1 km	MPC · JPL
733176	2014 QR_{28}	—	August 18, 2014	Haleakala	Pan-STARRS 1	·	1.6 km	MPC · JPL
733177	2014 QL_{29}	—	March 5, 2006	Kitt Peak	Spacewatch	·	3.3 km	MPC · JPL
733178	2014 QO_{30}	—	February 5, 2011	Mount Lemmon	Mount Lemmon Survey	·	2.2 km	MPC · JPL
733179	2014 QF_{31}	—	March 29, 2010	WISE	WISE	·	3.1 km	MPC · JPL
733180	2014 QS_{31}	—	January 14, 2008	Kitt Peak	Spacewatch	·	1.4 km	MPC · JPL
733181	2014 QK_{35}	—	June 29, 2014	Haleakala	Pan-STARRS 1	·	1.2 km	MPC · JPL
733182	2014 QX_{42}	—	December 17, 2006	Mount Lemmon	Mount Lemmon Survey	JUN	1.8 km	MPC · JPL
733183	2014 QC_{47}	—	November 25, 2005	Kitt Peak	Spacewatch	LIX	3.7 km	MPC · JPL
733184	2014 QV_{48}	—	January 1, 2012	Mount Lemmon	Mount Lemmon Survey	·	1.8 km	MPC · JPL
733185	2014 QY_{49}	—	October 28, 2008	Kitt Peak	Spacewatch	·	570 m	MPC · JPL
733186	2014 QL_{66}	—	July 27, 2014	Tivoli	G. Lehmann, ~Knöfel, A.	·	520 m	MPC · JPL
733187	2014 QE_{67}	—	June 23, 2014	Kitt Peak	Spacewatch	·	1.3 km	MPC · JPL
733188	2014 QR_{69}	—	August 20, 2014	Haleakala	Pan-STARRS 1	·	1.7 km	MPC · JPL
733189	2014 QW_{74}	—	December 14, 1995	Kitt Peak	Spacewatch	·	2.0 km	MPC · JPL
733190	2014 QJ_{77}	—	September 16, 2009	Mount Lemmon	Mount Lemmon Survey	·	3.9 km	MPC · JPL
733191	2014 QJ_{78}	—	April 10, 2013	Haleakala	Pan-STARRS 1	·	1.5 km	MPC · JPL
733192	2014 QN_{83}	—	September 17, 2006	Catalina	CSS	·	1.5 km	MPC · JPL
733193	2014 QM_{84}	—	January 19, 2010	WISE	WISE	LUT	3.2 km	MPC · JPL
733194	2014 QQ_{85}	—	July 8, 2000	Kitt Peak	Spacewatch	·	2.4 km	MPC · JPL
733195	2014 QP_{87}	—	October 4, 2003	Kitt Peak	Spacewatch	THB	2.8 km	MPC · JPL
733196	2014 QW_{92}	—	April 16, 2013	Haleakala	Pan-STARRS 1	EMA	2.6 km	MPC · JPL
733197	2014 QL_{93}	—	January 20, 2012	Haleakala	Pan-STARRS 1	·	2.6 km	MPC · JPL
733198	2014 QL_{94}	—	October 4, 2004	Kitt Peak	Spacewatch	EOS	1.3 km	MPC · JPL
733199	2014 QW_{101}	—	August 20, 2014	Haleakala	Pan-STARRS 1	·	1.3 km	MPC · JPL
733200	2014 QN_{103}	—	August 20, 2014	Haleakala	Pan-STARRS 1	·	1.5 km	MPC · JPL

== 733201–733300 ==
back to top

Designation			Discovery			Properties		Ref
Permanent	Provisional	Named after	Date	Site	Discoverer(s)	Category	Diam.	Ref
733201	2014 QK_{104}	—	February 25, 2012	Mount Lemmon	Mount Lemmon Survey	·	1.6 km	MPC · JPL
733202	2014 QV_{104}	—	August 20, 2014	Haleakala	Pan-STARRS 1	·	1.1 km	MPC · JPL
733203	2014 QA_{106}	—	February 13, 2012	Haleakala	Pan-STARRS 1	·	1.8 km	MPC · JPL
733204	2014 QF_{108}	—	July 1, 2014	Haleakala	Pan-STARRS 1	·	490 m	MPC · JPL
733205	2014 QS_{110}	—	February 27, 2012	Haleakala	Pan-STARRS 1	·	1.5 km	MPC · JPL
733206	2014 QM_{112}	—	April 15, 2008	Mount Lemmon	Mount Lemmon Survey	·	1.4 km	MPC · JPL
733207	2014 QS_{114}	—	October 30, 2002	Apache Point	SDSS Collaboration	·	1.2 km	MPC · JPL
733208	2014 QE_{115}	—	September 10, 2007	Mount Lemmon	Mount Lemmon Survey	·	630 m	MPC · JPL
733209	2014 QK_{115}	—	August 6, 2014	Kitt Peak	Spacewatch	·	570 m	MPC · JPL
733210	2014 QL_{115}	—	August 20, 2014	Haleakala	Pan-STARRS 1	EOS	1.6 km	MPC · JPL
733211	2014 QS_{118}	—	November 13, 2006	Kitt Peak	Spacewatch	·	940 m	MPC · JPL
733212	2014 QA_{121}	—	December 3, 2010	Mount Lemmon	Mount Lemmon Survey	KOR	1.1 km	MPC · JPL
733213	2014 QU_{121}	—	July 7, 2014	Haleakala	Pan-STARRS 1	·	1.4 km	MPC · JPL
733214	2014 QV_{124}	—	September 28, 2008	Mount Lemmon	Mount Lemmon Survey	SYL	3.7 km	MPC · JPL
733215	2014 QS_{125}	—	January 27, 2011	Mount Lemmon	Mount Lemmon Survey	EOS	1.6 km	MPC · JPL
733216	2014 QD_{126}	—	November 20, 2007	Mount Lemmon	Mount Lemmon Survey	ERI	980 m	MPC · JPL
733217	2014 QM_{126}	—	May 7, 2008	Kitt Peak	Spacewatch	·	1.5 km	MPC · JPL
733218	2014 QJ_{129}	—	January 17, 2010	WISE	WISE	·	2.8 km	MPC · JPL
733219	2014 QH_{133}	—	August 5, 2014	Haleakala	Pan-STARRS 1	KOR	1.1 km	MPC · JPL
733220	2014 QK_{135}	—	August 20, 2014	Haleakala	Pan-STARRS 1	·	560 m	MPC · JPL
733221	2014 QO_{135}	—	September 26, 2007	Mount Lemmon	Mount Lemmon Survey	·	810 m	MPC · JPL
733222	2014 QD_{138}	—	March 19, 2013	Haleakala	Pan-STARRS 1	ADE	1.4 km	MPC · JPL
733223	2014 QT_{140}	—	October 27, 2005	Kitt Peak	Spacewatch	KOR	1.1 km	MPC · JPL
733224	2014 QD_{143}	—	May 22, 2010	Kitt Peak	Spacewatch	·	530 m	MPC · JPL
733225	2014 QP_{144}	—	August 28, 2003	Palomar	NEAT	·	6.3 km	MPC · JPL
733226	2014 QR_{147}	—	August 3, 2014	Haleakala	Pan-STARRS 1	·	1.7 km	MPC · JPL
733227	2014 QS_{148}	—	September 29, 2003	Kitt Peak	Spacewatch	·	2.6 km	MPC · JPL
733228	2014 QO_{149}	—	September 26, 2003	Apache Point	SDSS Collaboration	·	2.1 km	MPC · JPL
733229	2014 QF_{151}	—	November 5, 2004	Campo Imperatore	CINEOS	·	960 m	MPC · JPL
733230	2014 QD_{154}	—	March 8, 2013	Charleston	R. Holmes	·	2.1 km	MPC · JPL
733231	2014 QG_{154}	—	June 24, 2014	Haleakala	Pan-STARRS 1	·	2.4 km	MPC · JPL
733232	2014 QM_{156}	—	August 22, 2014	Haleakala	Pan-STARRS 1	EOS	1.5 km	MPC · JPL
733233	2014 QZ_{156}	—	June 29, 2014	Haleakala	Pan-STARRS 1	·	2.0 km	MPC · JPL
733234	2014 QQ_{158}	—	May 18, 2010	WISE	WISE	KON	2.5 km	MPC · JPL
733235	2014 QJ_{163}	—	December 1, 2006	Kitt Peak	Spacewatch	ADE	1.9 km	MPC · JPL
733236	2014 QP_{173}	—	February 7, 2000	Kitt Peak	Spacewatch	·	1.7 km	MPC · JPL
733237	2014 QV_{176}	—	October 4, 2002	Apache Point	SDSS Collaboration	·	3.3 km	MPC · JPL
733238	2014 QK_{177}	—	January 7, 2006	Mount Lemmon	Mount Lemmon Survey	·	1.5 km	MPC · JPL
733239	2014 QV_{177}	—	January 27, 2007	Mount Lemmon	Mount Lemmon Survey	·	1.8 km	MPC · JPL
733240	2014 QK_{182}	—	July 15, 2005	Kitt Peak	Spacewatch	·	1.5 km	MPC · JPL
733241	2014 QL_{182}	—	February 1, 1995	Kitt Peak	Spacewatch	·	1.2 km	MPC · JPL
733242	2014 QO_{183}	—	September 17, 2009	Mount Lemmon	Mount Lemmon Survey	LIX	2.7 km	MPC · JPL
733243	2014 QH_{185}	—	December 30, 2007	Kitt Peak	Spacewatch	·	1.3 km	MPC · JPL
733244	2014 QX_{188}	—	February 26, 2009	Cerro Burek	I. de la Cueva	·	1.1 km	MPC · JPL
733245	2014 QD_{192}	—	October 19, 2003	Kitt Peak	Spacewatch	·	950 m	MPC · JPL
733246	2014 QR_{193}	—	August 22, 2014	Haleakala	Pan-STARRS 1	NEM	1.7 km	MPC · JPL
733247	2014 QP_{196}	—	January 30, 2011	Haleakala	Pan-STARRS 1	·	2.0 km	MPC · JPL
733248	2014 QG_{202}	—	August 22, 2014	Haleakala	Pan-STARRS 1	·	1.6 km	MPC · JPL
733249	2014 QZ_{202}	—	January 14, 2010	WISE	WISE	·	2.3 km	MPC · JPL
733250	2014 QO_{204}	—	September 20, 2000	Kitt Peak	Deep Ecliptic Survey	·	1.6 km	MPC · JPL
733251	2014 QR_{208}	—	October 4, 1999	Kitt Peak	Spacewatch	·	1.3 km	MPC · JPL
733252	2014 QQ_{209}	—	November 17, 2009	Catalina	CSS	·	3.1 km	MPC · JPL
733253	2014 QJ_{217}	—	December 14, 2006	Mount Lemmon	Mount Lemmon Survey	·	1.3 km	MPC · JPL
733254	2014 QV_{217}	—	March 19, 2007	Mount Lemmon	Mount Lemmon Survey	·	2.0 km	MPC · JPL
733255	2014 QN_{221}	—	June 24, 2014	Haleakala	Pan-STARRS 1	·	3.2 km	MPC · JPL
733256	2014 QM_{224}	—	September 19, 2003	Palomar	NEAT	·	4.3 km	MPC · JPL
733257	2014 QS_{224}	—	August 23, 2007	Dauban	F. Kugel, C. Rinner	·	2.1 km	MPC · JPL
733258	2014 QA_{227}	—	September 15, 2004	Kitt Peak	Spacewatch	·	570 m	MPC · JPL
733259	2014 QM_{227}	—	October 11, 2010	Mount Lemmon	Mount Lemmon Survey	·	1.5 km	MPC · JPL
733260	2014 QT_{227}	—	August 20, 2014	Haleakala	Pan-STARRS 1	·	1.4 km	MPC · JPL
733261	2014 QM_{229}	—	August 20, 2014	Haleakala	Pan-STARRS 1	KOR	940 m	MPC · JPL
733262	2014 QO_{229}	—	August 20, 2014	Haleakala	Pan-STARRS 1	·	1.4 km	MPC · JPL
733263	2014 QU_{230}	—	August 22, 2014	Haleakala	Pan-STARRS 1	·	1.2 km	MPC · JPL
733264	2014 QA_{233}	—	March 13, 2010	Kitt Peak	Spacewatch	·	560 m	MPC · JPL
733265	2014 QV_{233}	—	November 25, 2005	Mount Lemmon	Mount Lemmon Survey	KOR	1.2 km	MPC · JPL
733266	2014 QZ_{234}	—	August 22, 2014	Haleakala	Pan-STARRS 1	·	1.4 km	MPC · JPL
733267	2014 QX_{236}	—	August 20, 2014	Haleakala	Pan-STARRS 1	·	2.1 km	MPC · JPL
733268	2014 QX_{238}	—	November 11, 2009	Mount Lemmon	Mount Lemmon Survey	·	2.0 km	MPC · JPL
733269	2014 QE_{239}	—	October 14, 2001	Apache Point	SDSS Collaboration	·	1.3 km	MPC · JPL
733270	2014 QD_{244}	—	August 18, 2009	Kitt Peak	Spacewatch	·	1.5 km	MPC · JPL
733271	2014 QG_{246}	—	August 22, 2014	Haleakala	Pan-STARRS 1	EOS	1.6 km	MPC · JPL
733272	2014 QC_{250}	—	January 15, 2011	Mount Lemmon	Mount Lemmon Survey	·	1.4 km	MPC · JPL
733273	2014 QR_{250}	—	August 22, 2014	Haleakala	Pan-STARRS 1	·	530 m	MPC · JPL
733274	2014 QL_{252}	—	January 28, 2011	Mount Lemmon	Mount Lemmon Survey	·	2.0 km	MPC · JPL
733275	2014 QU_{253}	—	December 11, 2010	Mount Lemmon	Mount Lemmon Survey	·	1.7 km	MPC · JPL
733276	2014 QQ_{254}	—	February 2, 2006	Kitt Peak	Spacewatch	·	2.9 km	MPC · JPL
733277	2014 QZ_{254}	—	January 18, 2010	WISE	WISE	EMA	2.4 km	MPC · JPL
733278	2014 QS_{255}	—	March 29, 2012	Kitt Peak	Spacewatch	·	2.2 km	MPC · JPL
733279	2014 QJ_{258}	—	November 15, 2006	Catalina	CSS	·	1.6 km	MPC · JPL
733280	2014 QF_{260}	—	February 7, 2010	WISE	WISE	·	2.1 km	MPC · JPL
733281	2014 QR_{269}	—	October 24, 2005	Mauna Kea	A. Boattini	·	3.3 km	MPC · JPL
733282	2014 QE_{272}	—	February 23, 2007	Catalina	CSS	·	4.0 km	MPC · JPL
733283	2014 QL_{274}	—	February 13, 2010	WISE	WISE	·	2.3 km	MPC · JPL
733284	2014 QS_{282}	—	September 30, 2010	Mount Lemmon	Mount Lemmon Survey	·	1.5 km	MPC · JPL
733285	2014 QH_{283}	—	June 28, 2014	Haleakala	Pan-STARRS 1	·	1.8 km	MPC · JPL
733286	2014 QW_{283}	—	September 19, 1998	Apache Point	SDSS	·	2.5 km	MPC · JPL
733287	2014 QC_{286}	—	January 8, 2010	WISE	WISE	·	2.8 km	MPC · JPL
733288	2014 QM_{286}	—	March 18, 2010	WISE	WISE	T_{j} (2.97)	3.9 km	MPC · JPL
733289	2014 QR_{286}	—	August 25, 2014	Haleakala	Pan-STARRS 1	·	1.7 km	MPC · JPL
733290	2014 QZ_{291}	—	August 25, 2014	Haleakala	Pan-STARRS 1	·	2.7 km	MPC · JPL
733291	2014 QY_{293}	—	August 3, 2008	Siding Spring	SSS	·	3.6 km	MPC · JPL
733292	2014 QB_{296}	—	October 12, 2001	Anderson Mesa	LONEOS	PAL	1.4 km	MPC · JPL
733293	2014 QK_{298}	—	September 25, 1998	Apache Point	SDSS	(5)	1.1 km	MPC · JPL
733294	2014 QP_{298}	—	February 23, 2007	Mount Lemmon	Mount Lemmon Survey	BRA	1.1 km	MPC · JPL
733295	2014 QT_{303}	—	January 25, 2003	Apache Point	SDSS Collaboration	NEM	2.0 km	MPC · JPL
733296	2014 QS_{305}	—	January 8, 2010	Zelenchukskaya Stn	T. V. Krjačko, Satovski, B.	·	6.1 km	MPC · JPL
733297	2014 QB_{308}	—	October 29, 2005	Kitt Peak	Spacewatch	AST	1.5 km	MPC · JPL
733298	2014 QJ_{309}	—	July 22, 2010	WISE	WISE	·	3.0 km	MPC · JPL
733299	2014 QP_{309}	—	June 18, 2010	WISE	WISE	·	1.4 km	MPC · JPL
733300	2014 QB_{315}	—	March 5, 2013	Haleakala	Pan-STARRS 1	·	2.0 km	MPC · JPL

== 733301–733400 ==
back to top

Designation			Discovery			Properties		Ref
Permanent	Provisional	Named after	Date	Site	Discoverer(s)	Category	Diam.	Ref
733301	2014 QW_{315}	—	July 20, 2010	WISE	WISE	HOF	2.0 km	MPC · JPL
733302	2014 QV_{320}	—	June 5, 2013	Mount Lemmon	Mount Lemmon Survey	·	1.7 km	MPC · JPL
733303	2014 QM_{321}	—	August 25, 2014	Haleakala	Pan-STARRS 1	GEF	1.1 km	MPC · JPL
733304	2014 QX_{321}	—	March 4, 2000	Socorro	LINEAR	ADE	2.9 km	MPC · JPL
733305	2014 QS_{326}	—	February 2, 2010	WISE	WISE	·	2.9 km	MPC · JPL
733306	2014 QD_{329}	—	January 17, 2009	Kitt Peak	Spacewatch	·	610 m	MPC · JPL
733307	2014 QU_{329}	—	December 13, 2009	Weihai	University, Shandong	·	2.9 km	MPC · JPL
733308	2014 QY_{329}	—	September 18, 2003	Anderson Mesa	LONEOS	·	4.8 km	MPC · JPL
733309	2014 QX_{332}	—	December 13, 2010	Mount Lemmon	Mount Lemmon Survey	·	1.7 km	MPC · JPL
733310	2014 QC_{333}	—	April 9, 2006	Kitt Peak	Spacewatch	·	3.0 km	MPC · JPL
733311	2014 QE_{336}	—	February 24, 2006	Catalina	CSS	VER	4.0 km	MPC · JPL
733312	2014 QF_{336}	—	January 9, 2010	WISE	WISE	·	1.9 km	MPC · JPL
733313	2014 QR_{336}	—	August 30, 1995	La Silla	C.-I. Lagerkvist	NYS	1.1 km	MPC · JPL
733314	2014 QH_{338}	—	February 1, 2008	Mount Lemmon	Mount Lemmon Survey	·	1.8 km	MPC · JPL
733315	2014 QP_{338}	—	August 27, 2009	Kitt Peak	Spacewatch	·	1.5 km	MPC · JPL
733316	2014 QQ_{338}	—	July 4, 2005	Kitt Peak	Spacewatch	·	1.5 km	MPC · JPL
733317	2014 QQ_{343}	—	September 13, 2005	Kitt Peak	Spacewatch	DOR	2.1 km	MPC · JPL
733318	2014 QJ_{344}	—	January 2, 2011	Mount Lemmon	Mount Lemmon Survey	·	2.4 km	MPC · JPL
733319	2014 QN_{345}	—	October 25, 2005	Mount Lemmon	Mount Lemmon Survey	·	1.9 km	MPC · JPL
733320	2014 QT_{347}	—	December 13, 2006	Mount Lemmon	Mount Lemmon Survey	·	1.8 km	MPC · JPL
733321	2014 QB_{348}	—	July 8, 2014	Haleakala	Pan-STARRS 1	·	2.2 km	MPC · JPL
733322	2014 QT_{349}	—	October 18, 2003	Kitt Peak	Spacewatch	·	2.4 km	MPC · JPL
733323	2014 QS_{352}	—	September 22, 2009	Mount Lemmon	Mount Lemmon Survey	THM	1.8 km	MPC · JPL
733324	2014 QA_{353}	—	August 20, 2006	Palomar	NEAT	·	1.6 km	MPC · JPL
733325	2014 QA_{354}	—	June 7, 2013	Haleakala	Pan-STARRS 1	KOR	1.1 km	MPC · JPL
733326	2014 QB_{354}	—	August 27, 2014	Haleakala	Pan-STARRS 1	·	2.0 km	MPC · JPL
733327	2014 QO_{360}	—	November 3, 2010	Mount Lemmon	Mount Lemmon Survey	·	1.3 km	MPC · JPL
733328	2014 QJ_{363}	—	January 31, 2003	Anderson Mesa	LONEOS	H	340 m	MPC · JPL
733329	2014 QV_{366}	—	September 7, 2008	Mount Lemmon	Mount Lemmon Survey	·	2.3 km	MPC · JPL
733330	2014 QB_{369}	—	July 31, 2014	Haleakala	Pan-STARRS 1	·	540 m	MPC · JPL
733331	2014 QY_{372}	—	April 28, 2010	WISE	WISE	·	1.1 km	MPC · JPL
733332	2014 QU_{374}	—	September 17, 2003	Kitt Peak	Spacewatch	·	2.9 km	MPC · JPL
733333	2014 QW_{374}	—	September 24, 2009	Kitt Peak	Spacewatch	·	1.8 km	MPC · JPL
733334	2014 QQ_{379}	—	September 19, 2003	Kitt Peak	Spacewatch	·	2.2 km	MPC · JPL
733335	2014 QZ_{380}	—	August 27, 2014	Haleakala	Pan-STARRS 1	·	1.8 km	MPC · JPL
733336	2014 QA_{382}	—	August 24, 2014	Kitt Peak	Spacewatch	·	660 m	MPC · JPL
733337	2014 QZ_{382}	—	September 18, 2010	Mount Lemmon	Mount Lemmon Survey	·	1.3 km	MPC · JPL
733338	2014 QM_{383}	—	August 28, 2014	Haleakala	Pan-STARRS 1	·	1.2 km	MPC · JPL
733339	2014 QD_{386}	—	August 29, 2014	Mount Lemmon	Mount Lemmon Survey	·	1.9 km	MPC · JPL
733340	2014 QS_{386}	—	October 30, 2009	Mount Lemmon	Mount Lemmon Survey	EOS	1.4 km	MPC · JPL
733341	2014 QM_{387}	—	March 16, 2007	Kitt Peak	Spacewatch	·	780 m	MPC · JPL
733342	2014 QG_{394}	—	October 2, 2009	Mount Lemmon	Mount Lemmon Survey	·	2.6 km	MPC · JPL
733343	2014 QL_{401}	—	August 28, 2014	Haleakala	Pan-STARRS 1	·	1.5 km	MPC · JPL
733344	2014 QM_{402}	—	January 16, 2010	WISE	WISE	URS	2.7 km	MPC · JPL
733345	2014 QU_{402}	—	July 30, 2014	Kitt Peak	Spacewatch	·	2.3 km	MPC · JPL
733346	2014 QL_{405}	—	September 3, 2002	Palomar	NEAT	·	1.7 km	MPC · JPL
733347	2014 QE_{408}	—	February 11, 2010	WISE	WISE	·	3.4 km	MPC · JPL
733348	2014 QP_{420}	—	October 14, 2001	Apache Point	SDSS Collaboration	·	1.7 km	MPC · JPL
733349	2014 QJ_{424}	—	June 26, 2014	Mount Lemmon	Mount Lemmon Survey	·	1.7 km	MPC · JPL
733350	2014 QP_{425}	—	May 8, 2013	Haleakala	Pan-STARRS 1	AST	1.5 km	MPC · JPL
733351	2014 QE_{427}	—	September 24, 2009	Mount Lemmon	Mount Lemmon Survey	·	4.6 km	MPC · JPL
733352	2014 QT_{427}	—	October 4, 2005	Mount Lemmon	Mount Lemmon Survey	AGN	900 m	MPC · JPL
733353	2014 QN_{430}	—	December 10, 2005	Kitt Peak	Spacewatch	·	680 m	MPC · JPL
733354	2014 QL_{437}	—	July 29, 2008	Mount Lemmon	Mount Lemmon Survey	·	2.3 km	MPC · JPL
733355	2014 QD_{448}	—	March 21, 1999	Apache Point	SDSS Collaboration	·	2.3 km	MPC · JPL
733356	2014 QG_{448}	—	February 23, 2012	Mount Lemmon	Mount Lemmon Survey	KOR	1.1 km	MPC · JPL
733357	2014 QL_{448}	—	November 1, 2005	Mount Lemmon	Mount Lemmon Survey	KOR	1.1 km	MPC · JPL
733358	2014 QX_{450}	—	November 18, 2003	Kitt Peak	Spacewatch	·	2.6 km	MPC · JPL
733359	2014 QY_{450}	—	October 2, 2009	Mount Lemmon	Mount Lemmon Survey	·	2.8 km	MPC · JPL
733360	2014 QA_{451}	—	April 20, 2007	Mount Lemmon	Mount Lemmon Survey	EOS	1.4 km	MPC · JPL
733361	2014 QG_{451}	—	July 28, 2008	Mount Lemmon	Mount Lemmon Survey	·	4.4 km	MPC · JPL
733362	2014 QS_{452}	—	August 27, 2014	Haleakala	Pan-STARRS 1	·	2.0 km	MPC · JPL
733363	2014 QB_{453}	—	July 27, 2014	Haleakala	Pan-STARRS 1	·	2.2 km	MPC · JPL
733364	2014 QR_{454}	—	February 10, 2011	Mount Lemmon	Mount Lemmon Survey	EOS	1.5 km	MPC · JPL
733365	2014 QU_{454}	—	August 31, 2014	Haleakala	Pan-STARRS 1	KOR	1.0 km	MPC · JPL
733366	2014 QU_{455}	—	August 27, 2014	Haleakala	Pan-STARRS 1	EOS	1.3 km	MPC · JPL
733367	2014 QK_{458}	—	August 18, 2014	Haleakala	Pan-STARRS 1	EOS	1.7 km	MPC · JPL
733368	2014 QN_{458}	—	March 1, 2008	Kitt Peak	Spacewatch	·	1.8 km	MPC · JPL
733369	2014 QW_{458}	—	September 21, 2009	Kitt Peak	Spacewatch	EOS	1.3 km	MPC · JPL
733370	2014 QC_{459}	—	December 25, 2010	Mount Lemmon	Mount Lemmon Survey	·	1.9 km	MPC · JPL
733371	2014 QQ_{459}	—	June 7, 2013	Haleakala	Pan-STARRS 1	·	1.7 km	MPC · JPL
733372	2014 QV_{459}	—	November 7, 2010	Mount Lemmon	Mount Lemmon Survey	AST	1.3 km	MPC · JPL
733373	2014 QV_{460}	—	November 30, 2010	Kitt Peak	Spacewatch	·	1.7 km	MPC · JPL
733374	2014 QZ_{460}	—	March 23, 2012	Mount Lemmon	Mount Lemmon Survey	KOR	1.3 km	MPC · JPL
733375	2014 QO_{461}	—	August 20, 2014	Haleakala	Pan-STARRS 1	·	2.0 km	MPC · JPL
733376	2014 QN_{463}	—	August 22, 2014	Haleakala	Pan-STARRS 1	EOS	1.3 km	MPC · JPL
733377	2014 QQ_{467}	—	February 21, 2007	Kitt Peak	Spacewatch	KOR	1.1 km	MPC · JPL
733378	2014 QY_{467}	—	August 27, 2014	Haleakala	Pan-STARRS 1	KOR	960 m	MPC · JPL
733379	2014 QH_{469}	—	April 7, 2008	Kitt Peak	Spacewatch	·	1.6 km	MPC · JPL
733380	2014 QH_{470}	—	February 23, 2007	Kitt Peak	Spacewatch	·	2.5 km	MPC · JPL
733381	2014 QS_{472}	—	October 11, 2010	Mount Lemmon	Mount Lemmon Survey	·	1.5 km	MPC · JPL
733382	2014 QX_{473}	—	January 7, 2010	WISE	WISE	·	2.6 km	MPC · JPL
733383	2014 QK_{478}	—	October 11, 2009	Mount Lemmon	Mount Lemmon Survey	THM	2.2 km	MPC · JPL
733384	2014 QM_{478}	—	August 20, 2014	Haleakala	Pan-STARRS 1	·	1.1 km	MPC · JPL
733385	2014 QX_{480}	—	August 20, 2014	Haleakala	Pan-STARRS 1	·	1.3 km	MPC · JPL
733386	2014 QF_{484}	—	February 16, 2012	Haleakala	Pan-STARRS 1	·	1.6 km	MPC · JPL
733387	2014 QP_{484}	—	June 2, 2003	Cerro Tololo	Deep Ecliptic Survey	·	1.6 km	MPC · JPL
733388	2014 QP_{486}	—	April 28, 2009	Kitt Peak	Spacewatch	·	1.3 km	MPC · JPL
733389	2014 QA_{490}	—	January 17, 2010	WISE	WISE	·	4.6 km	MPC · JPL
733390	2014 QW_{490}	—	July 18, 2010	WISE	WISE	ADE	2.8 km	MPC · JPL
733391	2014 QC_{491}	—	August 22, 2014	Haleakala	Pan-STARRS 1	EOS	1.4 km	MPC · JPL
733392	2014 QP_{491}	—	February 2, 2006	Kitt Peak	Spacewatch	·	2.1 km	MPC · JPL
733393	2014 QA_{492}	—	November 6, 2010	Mount Lemmon	Mount Lemmon Survey	·	1.5 km	MPC · JPL
733394	2014 QN_{492}	—	July 25, 2014	Haleakala	Pan-STARRS 1	URS	2.8 km	MPC · JPL
733395	2014 QC_{493}	—	August 25, 2014	Haleakala	Pan-STARRS 1	·	650 m	MPC · JPL
733396	2014 QU_{493}	—	October 23, 2003	Apache Point	SDSS Collaboration	·	2.5 km	MPC · JPL
733397	2014 QP_{498}	—	August 23, 2014	Haleakala	Pan-STARRS 1	·	1.3 km	MPC · JPL
733398	2014 QM_{505}	—	January 3, 2016	Mount Lemmon	Mount Lemmon Survey	·	2.4 km	MPC · JPL
733399	2014 QY_{524}	—	August 31, 2014	Haleakala	Pan-STARRS 1	·	1.3 km	MPC · JPL
733400	2014 QQ_{528}	—	August 27, 2014	Haleakala	Pan-STARRS 1	·	530 m	MPC · JPL

== 733401–733500 ==
back to top

Designation			Discovery			Properties		Ref
Permanent	Provisional	Named after	Date	Site	Discoverer(s)	Category	Diam.	Ref
733401	2014 QA_{533}	—	August 28, 2014	Haleakala	Pan-STARRS 1	·	2.0 km	MPC · JPL
733402	2014 QD_{534}	—	August 28, 2014	Haleakala	Pan-STARRS 1	EOS	1.6 km	MPC · JPL
733403	2014 QZ_{538}	—	August 23, 2014	Haleakala	Pan-STARRS 1	·	1.9 km	MPC · JPL
733404	2014 QW_{546}	—	August 30, 2014	Haleakala	Pan-STARRS 1	·	1.5 km	MPC · JPL
733405	2014 QH_{554}	—	August 25, 2014	Haleakala	Pan-STARRS 1	·	1.3 km	MPC · JPL
733406	2014 QB_{556}	—	August 28, 2014	Haleakala	Pan-STARRS 1	EOS	1.4 km	MPC · JPL
733407	2014 QT_{557}	—	August 28, 2014	Haleakala	Pan-STARRS 1	·	700 m	MPC · JPL
733408	2014 QO_{571}	—	February 22, 2007	Kitt Peak	Spacewatch	·	1.7 km	MPC · JPL
733409	2014 QC_{575}	—	August 18, 2014	Haleakala	Pan-STARRS 1	·	1.1 km	MPC · JPL
733410	2014 RZ_{1}	—	March 16, 2012	Mount Lemmon	Mount Lemmon Survey	·	2.2 km	MPC · JPL
733411	2014 RK_{2}	—	February 3, 2012	Haleakala	Pan-STARRS 1	KOR	1.2 km	MPC · JPL
733412	2014 RK_{4}	—	June 28, 2014	Haleakala	Pan-STARRS 1	·	1.5 km	MPC · JPL
733413	2014 RU_{4}	—	October 28, 1994	Kitt Peak	Spacewatch	·	1.5 km	MPC · JPL
733414	2014 RJ_{7}	—	April 28, 2010	WISE	WISE	PHO	2.1 km	MPC · JPL
733415	2014 RJ_{8}	—	August 3, 2014	Haleakala	Pan-STARRS 1	·	1.5 km	MPC · JPL
733416	2014 RY_{10}	—	September 1, 2014	Mount Lemmon	Mount Lemmon Survey	EOS	1.3 km	MPC · JPL
733417	2014 RF_{12}	—	April 21, 2002	Palomar	NEAT	PHO	2.8 km	MPC · JPL
733418	2014 RK_{12}	—	June 20, 2010	WISE	WISE	·	3.9 km	MPC · JPL
733419	2014 RG_{13}	—	January 9, 2010	WISE	WISE	·	2.6 km	MPC · JPL
733420	2014 RF_{18}	—	January 19, 2005	Kitt Peak	Spacewatch	·	3.7 km	MPC · JPL
733421	2014 RX_{19}	—	November 23, 2003	Anderson Mesa	LONEOS	·	3.4 km	MPC · JPL
733422	2014 RR_{20}	—	October 20, 2003	Kitt Peak	Spacewatch	·	2.7 km	MPC · JPL
733423	2014 RF_{21}	—	August 26, 2005	Palomar	NEAT	·	1.6 km	MPC · JPL
733424	2014 RR_{24}	—	February 14, 2010	WISE	WISE	·	3.2 km	MPC · JPL
733425	2014 RW_{25}	—	October 3, 2008	Kitt Peak	Spacewatch	·	850 m	MPC · JPL
733426	2014 RD_{26}	—	October 15, 2002	Palomar	NEAT	EUN	1.4 km	MPC · JPL
733427	2014 RA_{30}	—	September 12, 2001	Kitt Peak	Spacewatch	·	1.8 km	MPC · JPL
733428	2014 RL_{31}	—	December 29, 2011	Mount Lemmon	Mount Lemmon Survey	·	1.8 km	MPC · JPL
733429	2014 RD_{34}	—	August 17, 2009	Kitt Peak	Spacewatch	KOR	1.3 km	MPC · JPL
733430	2014 RG_{34}	—	October 15, 2001	Apache Point	SDSS Collaboration	·	1.6 km	MPC · JPL
733431	2014 RK_{35}	—	January 7, 1994	Kitt Peak	Spacewatch	·	1.8 km	MPC · JPL
733432	2014 RA_{36}	—	October 8, 2008	Kitt Peak	Spacewatch	·	800 m	MPC · JPL
733433	2014 RW_{36}	—	September 19, 2003	Campo Imperatore	CINEOS	·	2.7 km	MPC · JPL
733434	2014 RC_{37}	—	October 24, 1995	Kitt Peak	Spacewatch	KOR	1.2 km	MPC · JPL
733435	2014 RB_{38}	—	April 18, 2012	Mount Lemmon	Mount Lemmon Survey	EOS	1.5 km	MPC · JPL
733436	2014 RF_{39}	—	July 9, 2010	WISE	WISE	·	1.6 km	MPC · JPL
733437	2014 RT_{40}	—	February 4, 2005	Kitt Peak	Spacewatch	·	3.8 km	MPC · JPL
733438	2014 RV_{40}	—	April 24, 2007	Mount Lemmon	Mount Lemmon Survey	URS	3.7 km	MPC · JPL
733439	2014 RN_{41}	—	October 31, 2005	Mauna Kea	A. Boattini	·	2.8 km	MPC · JPL
733440	2014 RR_{44}	—	November 10, 2010	Mount Lemmon	Mount Lemmon Survey	·	1.4 km	MPC · JPL
733441	2014 RA_{46}	—	February 11, 2010	WISE	WISE	·	2.7 km	MPC · JPL
733442	2014 RH_{47}	—	November 18, 2008	Kitt Peak	Spacewatch	·	610 m	MPC · JPL
733443	2014 RM_{47}	—	October 1, 2003	Kitt Peak	Spacewatch	·	1.9 km	MPC · JPL
733444	2014 RJ_{49}	—	September 27, 2003	Kitt Peak	Spacewatch	·	2.6 km	MPC · JPL
733445	2014 RS_{50}	—	August 6, 2010	WISE	WISE	ADE	2.3 km	MPC · JPL
733446	2014 RW_{50}	—	February 8, 2011	Mount Lemmon	Mount Lemmon Survey	·	2.0 km	MPC · JPL
733447	2014 RA_{56}	—	March 17, 2012	Mount Lemmon	Mount Lemmon Survey	·	1.3 km	MPC · JPL
733448	2014 RF_{57}	—	August 27, 2009	Kitt Peak	Spacewatch	KOR	1.1 km	MPC · JPL
733449	2014 RL_{58}	—	October 25, 2011	Haleakala	Pan-STARRS 1	·	600 m	MPC · JPL
733450	2014 RB_{61}	—	July 25, 2003	Palomar	NEAT	·	4.5 km	MPC · JPL
733451	2014 RO_{61}	—	February 26, 2012	Mayhill-ISON	L. Elenin	(7605)	4.8 km	MPC · JPL
733452	2014 RR_{61}	—	January 26, 2010	WISE	WISE	·	3.7 km	MPC · JPL
733453	2014 RY_{61}	—	August 28, 2014	Haleakala	Pan-STARRS 1	·	1.8 km	MPC · JPL
733454	2014 RF_{62}	—	January 17, 2010	WISE	WISE	·	3.1 km	MPC · JPL
733455	2014 RQ_{64}	—	June 5, 2003	Kitt Peak	Spacewatch	·	3.2 km	MPC · JPL
733456	2014 RC_{66}	—	September 20, 2009	Kitt Peak	Spacewatch	·	1.9 km	MPC · JPL
733457	2014 RB_{67}	—	February 12, 2000	Apache Point	SDSS Collaboration	JUN	900 m	MPC · JPL
733458	2014 RL_{67}	—	October 26, 2009	Kitt Peak	Spacewatch	·	1.9 km	MPC · JPL
733459	2014 RT_{67}	—	September 2, 2014	Haleakala	Pan-STARRS 1	·	1.9 km	MPC · JPL
733460	2014 RF_{68}	—	July 31, 2005	Palomar	NEAT	·	2.3 km	MPC · JPL
733461	2014 RO_{69}	—	September 14, 2014	Mount Lemmon	Mount Lemmon Survey	WIT	750 m	MPC · JPL
733462	2014 RZ_{69}	—	September 2, 2014	Catalina	CSS	H	510 m	MPC · JPL
733463	2014 RF_{76}	—	September 2, 2014	Haleakala	Pan-STARRS 1	AGN	950 m	MPC · JPL
733464	2014 RX_{76}	—	September 14, 2014	Mount Lemmon	Mount Lemmon Survey	·	1.6 km	MPC · JPL
733465	2014 RV_{78}	—	September 4, 2014	Haleakala	Pan-STARRS 1	·	2.8 km	MPC · JPL
733466	2014 SK_{4}	—	May 29, 2010	WISE	WISE	·	1.2 km	MPC · JPL
733467	2014 SD_{6}	—	August 31, 2014	Mount Lemmon	Mount Lemmon Survey	KOR	1.1 km	MPC · JPL
733468	2014 SM_{8}	—	October 25, 2005	Mount Lemmon	Mount Lemmon Survey	KOR	1.1 km	MPC · JPL
733469	2014 SS_{10}	—	February 28, 2012	Haleakala	Pan-STARRS 1	·	1.7 km	MPC · JPL
733470	2014 SW_{15}	—	February 3, 2009	Mount Lemmon	Mount Lemmon Survey	·	620 m	MPC · JPL
733471	2014 SJ_{18}	—	October 22, 2005	Kitt Peak	Spacewatch	·	1.5 km	MPC · JPL
733472	2014 SQ_{20}	—	January 19, 2012	Haleakala	Pan-STARRS 1	KOR	1.1 km	MPC · JPL
733473	2014 SZ_{23}	—	February 6, 2006	Kitt Peak	Spacewatch	·	2.0 km	MPC · JPL
733474	2014 SX_{26}	—	February 26, 2007	Mount Lemmon	Mount Lemmon Survey	KOR	1.2 km	MPC · JPL
733475	2014 SY_{26}	—	October 17, 2009	Mount Lemmon	Mount Lemmon Survey	·	1.6 km	MPC · JPL
733476	2014 SO_{32}	—	September 19, 2009	Kitt Peak	Spacewatch	·	1.9 km	MPC · JPL
733477	2014 SU_{32}	—	August 27, 2009	Kitt Peak	Spacewatch	·	1.6 km	MPC · JPL
733478	2014 SP_{41}	—	January 2, 2009	Kitt Peak	Spacewatch	·	650 m	MPC · JPL
733479	2014 SN_{46}	—	August 28, 2014	Haleakala	Pan-STARRS 1	HOF	2.2 km	MPC · JPL
733480	2014 SW_{48}	—	October 29, 2003	Kitt Peak	Spacewatch	·	2.9 km	MPC · JPL
733481	2014 SU_{51}	—	May 8, 2013	Haleakala	Pan-STARRS 1	·	1.5 km	MPC · JPL
733482	2014 SN_{55}	—	October 17, 2010	Mount Lemmon	Mount Lemmon Survey	·	1.2 km	MPC · JPL
733483	2014 SR_{57}	—	March 15, 2013	Kitt Peak	Spacewatch	·	960 m	MPC · JPL
733484	2014 SF_{63}	—	November 15, 2003	Kitt Peak	Spacewatch	·	1 km	MPC · JPL
733485	2014 SN_{63}	—	March 8, 2008	Mount Lemmon	Mount Lemmon Survey	·	1.4 km	MPC · JPL
733486	2014 SX_{63}	—	July 25, 2014	Haleakala	Pan-STARRS 1	VER	2.6 km	MPC · JPL
733487	2014 SA_{64}	—	November 25, 2005	Kitt Peak	Spacewatch	KOR	1.1 km	MPC · JPL
733488	2014 SV_{64}	—	July 25, 2014	Haleakala	Pan-STARRS 1	·	1.3 km	MPC · JPL
733489	2014 SS_{68}	—	July 25, 2010	WISE	WISE	PAD	1.5 km	MPC · JPL
733490	2014 SQ_{76}	—	January 30, 2011	Mount Lemmon	Mount Lemmon Survey	·	2.3 km	MPC · JPL
733491	2014 SG_{77}	—	December 1, 2008	Kitt Peak	Spacewatch	·	500 m	MPC · JPL
733492	2014 SS_{77}	—	August 28, 2014	Haleakala	Pan-STARRS 1	·	2.2 km	MPC · JPL
733493	2014 SG_{78}	—	September 18, 2014	Haleakala	Pan-STARRS 1	·	1.8 km	MPC · JPL
733494	2014 SK_{79}	—	September 30, 2010	Mount Lemmon	Mount Lemmon Survey	·	1.2 km	MPC · JPL
733495	2014 SX_{81}	—	October 14, 2009	Mount Lemmon	Mount Lemmon Survey	·	2.1 km	MPC · JPL
733496	2014 SR_{85}	—	September 27, 2009	Kitt Peak	Spacewatch	·	1.7 km	MPC · JPL
733497	2014 SZ_{87}	—	September 2, 2014	Haleakala	Pan-STARRS 1	·	430 m	MPC · JPL
733498	2014 SF_{92}	—	September 7, 2008	Mount Lemmon	Mount Lemmon Survey	·	2.2 km	MPC · JPL
733499	2014 SO_{93}	—	October 6, 2005	Mount Lemmon	Mount Lemmon Survey	DOR	1.8 km	MPC · JPL
733500	2014 SD_{99}	—	February 12, 2000	Apache Point	SDSS Collaboration	·	1.2 km	MPC · JPL

== 733501–733600 ==
back to top

Designation			Discovery			Properties		Ref
Permanent	Provisional	Named after	Date	Site	Discoverer(s)	Category	Diam.	Ref
733501	2014 SO_{101}	—	April 5, 2008	Mount Lemmon	Mount Lemmon Survey	AGN	900 m	MPC · JPL
733502	2014 SL_{119}	—	February 5, 2011	Catalina	CSS	·	1.8 km	MPC · JPL
733503	2014 SR_{121}	—	March 5, 2013	Mount Lemmon	Mount Lemmon Survey	·	510 m	MPC · JPL
733504	2014 SB_{125}	—	September 22, 2009	Mount Lemmon	Mount Lemmon Survey	·	2.7 km	MPC · JPL
733505	2014 SC_{126}	—	March 10, 2003	Kitt Peak	Spacewatch	·	1.2 km	MPC · JPL
733506	2014 SR_{129}	—	January 12, 2011	Mount Lemmon	Mount Lemmon Survey	·	1.7 km	MPC · JPL
733507	2014 SA_{137}	—	August 25, 2014	ESA OGS	ESA OGS	·	1.6 km	MPC · JPL
733508	2014 SR_{148}	—	November 24, 2003	Palomar	NEAT	TIR	3.4 km	MPC · JPL
733509	2014 SL_{149}	—	November 26, 2009	Mount Lemmon	Mount Lemmon Survey	·	2.5 km	MPC · JPL
733510	2014 SM_{149}	—	August 23, 2014	Haleakala	Pan-STARRS 1	·	1.5 km	MPC · JPL
733511	2014 SY_{150}	—	January 13, 2010	Mount Lemmon	Mount Lemmon Survey	·	2.8 km	MPC · JPL
733512	2014 SZ_{150}	—	July 30, 2008	Mount Lemmon	Mount Lemmon Survey	VER	2.3 km	MPC · JPL
733513	2014 SA_{155}	—	February 27, 2010	WISE	WISE	·	4.6 km	MPC · JPL
733514	2014 SX_{155}	—	March 17, 2010	WISE	WISE	·	3.2 km	MPC · JPL
733515	2014 SC_{157}	—	August 21, 2004	Siding Spring	SSS	·	640 m	MPC · JPL
733516	2014 SW_{158}	—	September 15, 2014	Mount Lemmon	Mount Lemmon Survey	·	2.1 km	MPC · JPL
733517	2014 SY_{158}	—	October 27, 1997	Flagstaff	B. A. Skiff	·	3.4 km	MPC · JPL
733518	2014 SE_{159}	—	October 26, 2011	Haleakala	Pan-STARRS 1	·	510 m	MPC · JPL
733519	2014 SK_{159}	—	September 19, 2014	Haleakala	Pan-STARRS 1	·	1.2 km	MPC · JPL
733520	2014 SO_{159}	—	September 30, 2003	Kitt Peak	Spacewatch	·	2.0 km	MPC · JPL
733521	2014 SF_{161}	—	January 7, 1999	Kitt Peak	Spacewatch	·	500 m	MPC · JPL
733522	2014 SH_{165}	—	March 5, 2006	Kitt Peak	Spacewatch	EOS	2.6 km	MPC · JPL
733523	2014 SZ_{165}	—	September 30, 2009	Mount Lemmon	Mount Lemmon Survey	EOS	1.6 km	MPC · JPL
733524	2014 SB_{169}	—	January 30, 2010	WISE	WISE	·	3.0 km	MPC · JPL
733525	2014 SX_{170}	—	November 23, 2009	Mount Lemmon	Mount Lemmon Survey	·	3.1 km	MPC · JPL
733526	2014 SK_{176}	—	January 13, 2010	WISE	WISE	·	2.6 km	MPC · JPL
733527	2014 SV_{177}	—	September 19, 1998	Apache Point	SDSS Collaboration	·	1.4 km	MPC · JPL
733528	2014 SV_{178}	—	October 24, 2009	Mount Lemmon	Mount Lemmon Survey	LIX	3.6 km	MPC · JPL
733529	2014 SZ_{178}	—	September 20, 2014	Haleakala	Pan-STARRS 1	·	1.5 km	MPC · JPL
733530	2014 SG_{180}	—	September 17, 2010	Mount Lemmon	Mount Lemmon Survey	·	920 m	MPC · JPL
733531	2014 SH_{180}	—	October 23, 2009	Kitt Peak	Spacewatch	·	1.8 km	MPC · JPL
733532	2014 SX_{181}	—	September 20, 2014	Haleakala	Pan-STARRS 1	·	1.3 km	MPC · JPL
733533	2014 SE_{182}	—	November 2, 2011	Kitt Peak	Spacewatch	·	630 m	MPC · JPL
733534	2014 SH_{185}	—	February 16, 2013	Mount Lemmon	Mount Lemmon Survey	·	620 m	MPC · JPL
733535	2014 SC_{186}	—	December 3, 2007	Kitt Peak	Spacewatch	·	940 m	MPC · JPL
733536	2014 SX_{189}	—	August 27, 2014	Haleakala	Pan-STARRS 1	·	960 m	MPC · JPL
733537	2014 SS_{191}	—	February 22, 2009	Kitt Peak	Spacewatch	MAS	710 m	MPC · JPL
733538	2014 SG_{192}	—	August 25, 2014	Haleakala	Pan-STARRS 1	·	1.4 km	MPC · JPL
733539	2014 SG_{195}	—	December 29, 2008	Mount Lemmon	Mount Lemmon Survey	·	450 m	MPC · JPL
733540	2014 SK_{198}	—	December 3, 2010	Mount Lemmon	Mount Lemmon Survey	·	1.5 km	MPC · JPL
733541	2014 SY_{198}	—	November 17, 2009	Kitt Peak	Spacewatch	·	2.6 km	MPC · JPL
733542	2014 SA_{201}	—	April 7, 2007	Mount Lemmon	Mount Lemmon Survey	EOS	1.5 km	MPC · JPL
733543	2014 SX_{203}	—	September 24, 2008	Mount Lemmon	Mount Lemmon Survey	·	3.0 km	MPC · JPL
733544	2014 SW_{204}	—	April 20, 2012	Mount Lemmon	Mount Lemmon Survey	·	1.5 km	MPC · JPL
733545	2014 SS_{205}	—	April 1, 2008	Mount Lemmon	Mount Lemmon Survey	MRX	830 m	MPC · JPL
733546	2014 SW_{205}	—	October 29, 2010	Kitt Peak	Spacewatch	·	1.5 km	MPC · JPL
733547	2014 SH_{208}	—	February 13, 2011	Kitt Peak	Spacewatch	·	1.5 km	MPC · JPL
733548	2014 SW_{210}	—	June 13, 2010	WISE	WISE	·	1.8 km	MPC · JPL
733549	2014 SH_{212}	—	March 3, 2010	WISE	WISE	TEL	1.1 km	MPC · JPL
733550	2014 SJ_{212}	—	December 17, 2009	Kitt Peak	Spacewatch	·	2.9 km	MPC · JPL
733551	2014 SC_{216}	—	September 20, 2014	Haleakala	Pan-STARRS 1	·	1.9 km	MPC · JPL
733552	2014 SU_{216}	—	March 26, 2003	Palomar	NEAT	·	1.9 km	MPC · JPL
733553	2014 SK_{217}	—	September 4, 2014	Haleakala	Pan-STARRS 1	·	1.9 km	MPC · JPL
733554	2014 SR_{217}	—	May 20, 2006	Palomar	NEAT	·	3.9 km	MPC · JPL
733555	2014 SH_{218}	—	September 6, 2008	Mount Lemmon	Mount Lemmon Survey	·	2.2 km	MPC · JPL
733556	2014 SV_{226}	—	October 3, 2008	Mount Lemmon	Mount Lemmon Survey	·	2.6 km	MPC · JPL
733557	2014 SR_{227}	—	April 21, 2009	Mount Lemmon	Mount Lemmon Survey	·	780 m	MPC · JPL
733558	2014 SF_{231}	—	June 18, 2013	Haleakala	Pan-STARRS 1	·	1.3 km	MPC · JPL
733559	2014 SX_{234}	—	January 8, 2011	Mount Lemmon	Mount Lemmon Survey	·	1.5 km	MPC · JPL
733560	2014 SQ_{243}	—	October 14, 2009	Mount Lemmon	Mount Lemmon Survey	·	3.3 km	MPC · JPL
733561	2014 SW_{243}	—	April 17, 2013	Haleakala	Pan-STARRS 1	·	1.3 km	MPC · JPL
733562	2014 SR_{247}	—	August 4, 2010	WISE	WISE	·	1.3 km	MPC · JPL
733563	2014 SY_{247}	—	July 23, 2010	WISE	WISE	·	1.6 km	MPC · JPL
733564	2014 SE_{248}	—	March 7, 2010	WISE	WISE	LIX	3.4 km	MPC · JPL
733565	2014 SM_{249}	—	October 15, 2002	Palomar	NEAT	·	1.2 km	MPC · JPL
733566	2014 SJ_{251}	—	September 25, 2009	Catalina	CSS	·	1.9 km	MPC · JPL
733567	2014 SU_{251}	—	January 26, 2010	WISE	WISE	·	3.4 km	MPC · JPL
733568	2014 SV_{251}	—	August 22, 2004	Kitt Peak	Spacewatch	·	1.7 km	MPC · JPL
733569	2014 SD_{252}	—	December 19, 2004	Mount Lemmon	Mount Lemmon Survey	·	2.0 km	MPC · JPL
733570	2014 SG_{253}	—	June 7, 2010	WISE	WISE	PHO	940 m	MPC · JPL
733571	2014 SW_{253}	—	October 17, 2003	Kitt Peak	Spacewatch	·	2.6 km	MPC · JPL
733572	2014 ST_{254}	—	November 21, 2009	Mount Lemmon	Mount Lemmon Survey	·	2.7 km	MPC · JPL
733573	2014 SL_{257}	—	September 23, 2014	Haleakala	Pan-STARRS 1	·	590 m	MPC · JPL
733574	2014 SL_{258}	—	September 23, 2014	Haleakala	Pan-STARRS 1	·	840 m	MPC · JPL
733575	2014 SH_{266}	—	February 25, 2000	Kitt Peak	Spacewatch	·	3.8 km	MPC · JPL
733576	2014 SR_{267}	—	February 27, 2012	Haleakala	Pan-STARRS 1	·	1.7 km	MPC · JPL
733577	2014 SX_{267}	—	March 10, 2002	Kitt Peak	Spacewatch	·	1.7 km	MPC · JPL
733578	2014 SB_{269}	—	September 22, 2009	Kitt Peak	Spacewatch	·	1.5 km	MPC · JPL
733579	2014 SB_{272}	—	April 18, 2012	Mount Lemmon	Mount Lemmon Survey	EOS	1.6 km	MPC · JPL
733580	2014 SO_{272}	—	September 20, 2014	Haleakala	Pan-STARRS 1	KOR	1.2 km	MPC · JPL
733581	2014 SM_{276}	—	September 15, 2014	Mount Lemmon	Mount Lemmon Survey	·	2.0 km	MPC · JPL
733582	2014 SK_{278}	—	February 4, 2003	La Silla	Barbieri, C.	·	1.4 km	MPC · JPL
733583	2014 SR_{279}	—	October 15, 2004	Mount Lemmon	Mount Lemmon Survey	·	520 m	MPC · JPL
733584	2014 SR_{280}	—	August 24, 2008	Kitt Peak	Spacewatch	URS	4.0 km	MPC · JPL
733585	2014 ST_{283}	—	January 31, 1995	Kitt Peak	Spacewatch	·	3.2 km	MPC · JPL
733586	2014 ST_{286}	—	February 3, 2010	WISE	WISE	·	2.5 km	MPC · JPL
733587	2014 SH_{290}	—	December 11, 2009	Mount Lemmon	Mount Lemmon Survey	·	2.9 km	MPC · JPL
733588	2014 SH_{292}	—	August 9, 2010	WISE	WISE	(194)	1.7 km	MPC · JPL
733589	2014 SV_{292}	—	September 17, 2003	Kitt Peak	Spacewatch	·	890 m	MPC · JPL
733590	2014 SK_{295}	—	November 19, 2003	Socorro	LINEAR	THB	3.0 km	MPC · JPL
733591	2014 SV_{295}	—	August 28, 2014	Haleakala	Pan-STARRS 1	·	2.1 km	MPC · JPL
733592	2014 SN_{297}	—	February 21, 2007	Mount Lemmon	Mount Lemmon Survey	·	1.6 km	MPC · JPL
733593	2014 SH_{299}	—	November 25, 2009	Mount Lemmon	Mount Lemmon Survey	·	1.9 km	MPC · JPL
733594	2014 SU_{299}	—	September 25, 2014	Kitt Peak	Spacewatch	·	610 m	MPC · JPL
733595	2014 SZ_{299}	—	April 9, 2005	Kitt Peak	Spacewatch	·	3.6 km	MPC · JPL
733596	2014 SC_{302}	—	January 14, 2010	WISE	WISE	·	2.7 km	MPC · JPL
733597	2014 SE_{302}	—	June 30, 2014	Haleakala	Pan-STARRS 1	·	700 m	MPC · JPL
733598	2014 SH_{302}	—	October 2, 2009	Mount Lemmon	Mount Lemmon Survey	·	3.1 km	MPC · JPL
733599	2014 SD_{305}	—	January 22, 2012	Haleakala	Pan-STARRS 1	·	2.0 km	MPC · JPL
733600	2014 SY_{314}	—	May 11, 2010	Mount Lemmon	Mount Lemmon Survey	·	560 m	MPC · JPL

== 733601–733700 ==
back to top

Designation			Discovery			Properties		Ref
Permanent	Provisional	Named after	Date	Site	Discoverer(s)	Category	Diam.	Ref
733601	2014 SZ_{320}	—	February 27, 2010	WISE	WISE	·	2.5 km	MPC · JPL
733602	2014 SJ_{321}	—	February 12, 2000	Apache Point	SDSS Collaboration	·	1.2 km	MPC · JPL
733603	2014 SP_{323}	—	October 26, 2009	Mount Lemmon	Mount Lemmon Survey	·	1.7 km	MPC · JPL
733604	2014 SW_{324}	—	October 16, 2003	Kitt Peak	Spacewatch	·	2.6 km	MPC · JPL
733605	2014 SA_{326}	—	March 21, 2010	WISE	WISE	·	3.6 km	MPC · JPL
733606	2014 SJ_{326}	—	September 7, 2008	Mount Lemmon	Mount Lemmon Survey	·	3.2 km	MPC · JPL
733607	2014 SR_{326}	—	October 20, 2003	Kitt Peak	Spacewatch	·	2.3 km	MPC · JPL
733608	2014 SH_{327}	—	August 28, 2009	Kitt Peak	Spacewatch	·	1.6 km	MPC · JPL
733609	2014 SK_{328}	—	October 31, 2010	Kitt Peak	Spacewatch	·	1.1 km	MPC · JPL
733610	2014 SX_{329}	—	September 17, 2003	Kitt Peak	Spacewatch	·	2.7 km	MPC · JPL
733611	2014 SF_{330}	—	September 29, 2014	Kitt Peak	Spacewatch	·	2.2 km	MPC · JPL
733612	2014 SP_{331}	—	March 13, 2002	Kitt Peak	Spacewatch	·	1.5 km	MPC · JPL
733613	2014 SN_{333}	—	September 12, 2009	Kitt Peak	Spacewatch	·	1.8 km	MPC · JPL
733614	2014 SB_{334}	—	November 2, 2008	Kitt Peak	Spacewatch	·	780 m	MPC · JPL
733615	2014 SO_{335}	—	January 27, 2006	Kitt Peak	Spacewatch	·	2.4 km	MPC · JPL
733616	2014 SL_{338}	—	July 30, 2005	Palomar	NEAT	·	1.3 km	MPC · JPL
733617	2014 SY_{339}	—	October 22, 2003	Apache Point	SDSS Collaboration	·	4.2 km	MPC · JPL
733618	2014 SQ_{341}	—	February 28, 2010	WISE	WISE	ELF	3.1 km	MPC · JPL
733619	2014 SE_{344}	—	June 3, 2010	Kitt Peak	Spacewatch	·	580 m	MPC · JPL
733620	2014 SO_{344}	—	September 20, 1995	Kitt Peak	Spacewatch	·	810 m	MPC · JPL
733621	2014 SW_{344}	—	October 16, 2003	Kitt Peak	Spacewatch	·	2.0 km	MPC · JPL
733622	2014 SK_{345}	—	April 21, 2009	Kitt Peak	Spacewatch	·	1.1 km	MPC · JPL
733623	2014 SR_{345}	—	September 15, 2014	Mount Lemmon	Mount Lemmon Survey	·	1.4 km	MPC · JPL
733624	2014 SB_{346}	—	November 5, 2007	Kitt Peak	Spacewatch	·	840 m	MPC · JPL
733625	2014 SF_{346}	—	September 19, 2014	Haleakala	Pan-STARRS 1	·	1.3 km	MPC · JPL
733626	2014 SX_{347}	—	January 18, 2010	WISE	WISE	NAE	2.1 km	MPC · JPL
733627	2014 SB_{353}	—	October 20, 2003	Palomar	NEAT	·	2.6 km	MPC · JPL
733628	2014 SD_{353}	—	March 10, 2005	Mount Lemmon	Mount Lemmon Survey	·	2.8 km	MPC · JPL
733629	2014 SW_{353}	—	July 28, 2010	WISE	WISE	KON	1.6 km	MPC · JPL
733630	2014 SH_{354}	—	March 26, 2007	Mount Lemmon	Mount Lemmon Survey	·	2.0 km	MPC · JPL
733631	2014 SJ_{354}	—	December 18, 2003	Socorro	LINEAR	·	2.7 km	MPC · JPL
733632	2014 SQ_{355}	—	March 27, 2012	Kitt Peak	Spacewatch	·	2.1 km	MPC · JPL
733633	2014 SY_{355}	—	September 18, 2014	Haleakala	Pan-STARRS 1	·	2.6 km	MPC · JPL
733634	2014 SH_{357}	—	September 18, 2014	Haleakala	Pan-STARRS 1	·	1.1 km	MPC · JPL
733635	2014 SE_{358}	—	October 26, 2011	Haleakala	Pan-STARRS 1	·	610 m	MPC · JPL
733636	2014 SH_{361}	—	January 18, 2010	WISE	WISE	·	1.6 km	MPC · JPL
733637	2014 SG_{362}	—	November 17, 2009	Mount Lemmon	Mount Lemmon Survey	LIX	2.4 km	MPC · JPL
733638	2014 SD_{363}	—	September 29, 2014	Haleakala	Pan-STARRS 1	EOS	1.4 km	MPC · JPL
733639	2014 SP_{364}	—	November 13, 2010	Mount Lemmon	Mount Lemmon Survey	·	1.6 km	MPC · JPL
733640	2014 ST_{371}	—	August 29, 2009	Kitt Peak	Spacewatch	·	1.7 km	MPC · JPL
733641	2014 SF_{372}	—	January 19, 2010	WISE	WISE	·	1.4 km	MPC · JPL
733642	2014 SA_{380}	—	February 11, 2011	Mount Lemmon	Mount Lemmon Survey	EOS	1.3 km	MPC · JPL
733643	2014 SE_{380}	—	September 18, 2014	Haleakala	Pan-STARRS 1	·	1.6 km	MPC · JPL
733644	2014 SF_{380}	—	September 23, 2014	Mount Lemmon	Mount Lemmon Survey	·	1.5 km	MPC · JPL
733645	2014 SM_{380}	—	September 19, 2014	Haleakala	Pan-STARRS 1	·	1.6 km	MPC · JPL
733646	2014 SU_{384}	—	September 19, 2014	Haleakala	Pan-STARRS 1	EOS	1.3 km	MPC · JPL
733647	2014 ST_{389}	—	October 22, 2003	Kitt Peak	Spacewatch	VER	2.2 km	MPC · JPL
733648	2014 SN_{391}	—	September 17, 2014	Haleakala	Pan-STARRS 1	·	1.4 km	MPC · JPL
733649	2014 ST_{394}	—	September 19, 2014	Haleakala	Pan-STARRS 1	NEM	1.7 km	MPC · JPL
733650	2014 SO_{406}	—	September 19, 2014	Haleakala	Pan-STARRS 1	PHO	630 m	MPC · JPL
733651	2014 TL_{5}	—	March 26, 2010	WISE	WISE	·	2.6 km	MPC · JPL
733652	2014 TT_{6}	—	September 22, 2009	Mount Lemmon	Mount Lemmon Survey	·	1.6 km	MPC · JPL
733653	2014 TB_{7}	—	September 5, 2008	Kitt Peak	Spacewatch	·	4.1 km	MPC · JPL
733654	2014 TT_{9}	—	September 18, 2003	Kitt Peak	Spacewatch	·	2.5 km	MPC · JPL
733655	2014 TF_{14}	—	October 1, 2014	Haleakala	Pan-STARRS 1	EOS	1.7 km	MPC · JPL
733656	2014 TP_{14}	—	October 23, 2003	Apache Point	SDSS	·	2.3 km	MPC · JPL
733657	2014 TT_{15}	—	November 17, 1999	Kitt Peak	Spacewatch	·	1.9 km	MPC · JPL
733658	2014 TR_{16}	—	January 16, 2005	Kitt Peak	Spacewatch	·	3.4 km	MPC · JPL
733659	2014 TN_{18}	—	April 15, 2012	Haleakala	Pan-STARRS 1	·	2.4 km	MPC · JPL
733660	2014 TL_{19}	—	October 23, 2009	Mount Lemmon	Mount Lemmon Survey	EOS	1.6 km	MPC · JPL
733661	2014 TK_{20}	—	October 1, 2014	Kitt Peak	Spacewatch	·	1.5 km	MPC · JPL
733662	2014 TF_{23}	—	November 24, 2011	Haleakala	Pan-STARRS 1	·	580 m	MPC · JPL
733663	2014 TO_{23}	—	October 1, 2014	Mount Lemmon	Mount Lemmon Survey	·	2.4 km	MPC · JPL
733664	2014 TT_{26}	—	October 27, 2005	Kitt Peak	Spacewatch	AGN	930 m	MPC · JPL
733665	2014 TL_{29}	—	October 2, 2014	Haleakala	Pan-STARRS 1	·	1.5 km	MPC · JPL
733666	2014 TE_{30}	—	June 8, 2007	Kitt Peak	Spacewatch	·	2.5 km	MPC · JPL
733667	2014 TC_{31}	—	November 18, 2009	Kitt Peak	Spacewatch	·	1.9 km	MPC · JPL
733668	2014 TH_{31}	—	September 20, 2003	Kitt Peak	Spacewatch	·	2.4 km	MPC · JPL
733669	2014 TT_{32}	—	September 25, 2009	Mount Lemmon	Mount Lemmon Survey	·	2.5 km	MPC · JPL
733670	2014 TR_{36}	—	October 21, 2003	Palomar	NEAT	·	2.9 km	MPC · JPL
733671	2014 TX_{39}	—	March 29, 2010	WISE	WISE	TIR	2.7 km	MPC · JPL
733672	2014 TJ_{40}	—	November 19, 2009	Kitt Peak	Spacewatch	·	3.2 km	MPC · JPL
733673	2014 TQ_{42}	—	February 28, 2012	Haleakala	Pan-STARRS 1	·	1.8 km	MPC · JPL
733674	2014 TD_{50}	—	October 14, 2014	Mount Lemmon	Mount Lemmon Survey	·	930 m	MPC · JPL
733675	2014 TR_{51}	—	February 7, 2010	WISE	WISE	EUP	3.5 km	MPC · JPL
733676	2014 TX_{51}	—	February 26, 2010	WISE	WISE	·	2.9 km	MPC · JPL
733677	2014 TN_{54}	—	November 19, 2003	Kitt Peak	Spacewatch	·	3.9 km	MPC · JPL
733678	2014 TM_{56}	—	March 20, 2001	Kitt Peak	Spacewatch	·	1.6 km	MPC · JPL
733679	2014 TD_{58}	—	October 20, 2009	Catalina	CSS	NAE	2.8 km	MPC · JPL
733680	2014 TF_{59}	—	October 19, 2007	Bisei	BATTeRS	·	510 m	MPC · JPL
733681	2014 TR_{60}	—	October 12, 1998	Kitt Peak	Spacewatch	·	2.5 km	MPC · JPL
733682	2014 TJ_{70}	—	September 5, 2000	Apache Point	SDSS Collaboration	·	740 m	MPC · JPL
733683	2014 TC_{73}	—	November 26, 2009	Mount Lemmon	Mount Lemmon Survey	EOS	1.3 km	MPC · JPL
733684	2014 TF_{74}	—	October 5, 2002	Apache Point	SDSS Collaboration	·	2.5 km	MPC · JPL
733685	2014 TK_{78}	—	April 15, 2012	Haleakala	Pan-STARRS 1	·	2.5 km	MPC · JPL
733686	2014 TH_{79}	—	February 7, 2011	Mount Lemmon	Mount Lemmon Survey	·	1.5 km	MPC · JPL
733687	2014 TY_{79}	—	September 17, 2009	Kitt Peak	Spacewatch	·	1.6 km	MPC · JPL
733688	2014 TC_{81}	—	April 15, 2012	Haleakala	Pan-STARRS 1	NAE	1.7 km	MPC · JPL
733689	2014 TU_{83}	—	March 5, 2002	Apache Point	SDSS	·	630 m	MPC · JPL
733690	2014 TV_{83}	—	January 26, 2010	WISE	WISE	·	2.4 km	MPC · JPL
733691	2014 TJ_{84}	—	October 20, 2003	Kitt Peak	Spacewatch	·	2.8 km	MPC · JPL
733692	2014 TO_{84}	—	December 14, 2010	Mount Lemmon	Mount Lemmon Survey	·	1.6 km	MPC · JPL
733693	2014 TZ_{84}	—	January 28, 2011	Mount Lemmon	Mount Lemmon Survey	AGN	980 m	MPC · JPL
733694	2014 TA_{85}	—	August 17, 2009	Kitt Peak	Spacewatch	·	1.7 km	MPC · JPL
733695	2014 TC_{85}	—	March 15, 2012	Catalina	CSS	·	1.1 km	MPC · JPL
733696	2014 TD_{85}	—	October 8, 2008	Mount Lemmon	Mount Lemmon Survey	·	2.1 km	MPC · JPL
733697	2014 TQ_{87}	—	February 9, 2005	Mount Lemmon	Mount Lemmon Survey	·	2.1 km	MPC · JPL
733698	2014 TS_{87}	—	December 20, 2004	Mount Lemmon	Mount Lemmon Survey	·	2.2 km	MPC · JPL
733699	2014 TH_{91}	—	October 1, 2014	Haleakala	Pan-STARRS 1	·	700 m	MPC · JPL
733700	2014 TJ_{91}	—	January 26, 2006	Kitt Peak	Spacewatch	EOS	1.6 km	MPC · JPL

== 733701–733800 ==
back to top

Designation			Discovery			Properties		Ref
Permanent	Provisional	Named after	Date	Site	Discoverer(s)	Category	Diam.	Ref
733701	2014 TQ_{91}	—	November 18, 2009	La Silla	La Silla	VER	2.1 km	MPC · JPL
733702	2014 TK_{93}	—	October 3, 2014	Mount Lemmon	Mount Lemmon Survey	·	1.1 km	MPC · JPL
733703	2014 TQ_{93}	—	February 7, 2011	Mount Lemmon	Mount Lemmon Survey	EOS	1.5 km	MPC · JPL
733704	2014 TH_{95}	—	October 2, 2014	Mount Lemmon	Mount Lemmon Survey	·	1.3 km	MPC · JPL
733705	2014 TW_{100}	—	January 19, 2010	WISE	WISE	·	2.4 km	MPC · JPL
733706	2014 TC_{111}	—	October 2, 2014	Haleakala	Pan-STARRS 1	·	1.4 km	MPC · JPL
733707	2014 TO_{121}	—	October 1, 2014	Haleakala	Pan-STARRS 1	·	1.8 km	MPC · JPL
733708	2014 UO_{1}	—	November 26, 2003	Kitt Peak	Spacewatch	·	3.2 km	MPC · JPL
733709	2014 UL_{3}	—	December 10, 2009	Mount Lemmon	Mount Lemmon Survey	·	2.3 km	MPC · JPL
733710	2014 UX_{6}	—	September 23, 2014	Mount Lemmon	Mount Lemmon Survey	·	1.5 km	MPC · JPL
733711	2014 UL_{7}	—	September 24, 2008	Mount Lemmon	Mount Lemmon Survey	·	2.8 km	MPC · JPL
733712	2014 UM_{10}	—	March 19, 2010	WISE	WISE	·	3.3 km	MPC · JPL
733713	2014 UO_{15}	—	February 23, 2012	Kitt Peak	Spacewatch	·	1.6 km	MPC · JPL
733714	2014 US_{15}	—	October 17, 2014	Mount Lemmon	Mount Lemmon Survey	·	2.6 km	MPC · JPL
733715	2014 UA_{17}	—	August 26, 2003	Cerro Tololo	Deep Ecliptic Survey	·	1.3 km	MPC · JPL
733716	2014 UT_{17}	—	March 3, 2000	Apache Point	SDSS Collaboration	·	1.7 km	MPC · JPL
733717	2014 UC_{21}	—	September 20, 2014	Haleakala	Pan-STARRS 1	·	1.6 km	MPC · JPL
733718	2014 UH_{22}	—	September 15, 2004	Kitt Peak	Spacewatch	·	2.1 km	MPC · JPL
733719	2014 UN_{24}	—	November 19, 2003	Kitt Peak	Spacewatch	·	2.4 km	MPC · JPL
733720	2014 UM_{27}	—	August 31, 2014	Haleakala	Pan-STARRS 1	·	1.9 km	MPC · JPL
733721	2014 UJ_{31}	—	September 23, 2014	Mount Lemmon	Mount Lemmon Survey	·	2.5 km	MPC · JPL
733722	2014 UJ_{36}	—	November 27, 2006	Mount Lemmon	Mount Lemmon Survey	·	850 m	MPC · JPL
733723	2014 UN_{37}	—	October 18, 2009	Mount Lemmon	Mount Lemmon Survey	·	2.0 km	MPC · JPL
733724	2014 UE_{39}	—	September 23, 2014	Mount Lemmon	Mount Lemmon Survey	EOS	1.6 km	MPC · JPL
733725	2014 UH_{42}	—	December 16, 2003	Kitt Peak	Spacewatch	·	2.6 km	MPC · JPL
733726	2014 UU_{42}	—	March 10, 2007	Mount Lemmon	Mount Lemmon Survey	·	1.5 km	MPC · JPL
733727	2014 UC_{44}	—	June 30, 2008	Kitt Peak	Spacewatch	·	1.5 km	MPC · JPL
733728	2014 UQ_{48}	—	October 2, 2014	Kitt Peak	Spacewatch	·	2.4 km	MPC · JPL
733729	2014 UW_{52}	—	October 22, 2014	Mount Lemmon	Mount Lemmon Survey	·	1.6 km	MPC · JPL
733730	2014 UY_{52}	—	September 19, 2009	Kitt Peak	Spacewatch	·	1.7 km	MPC · JPL
733731	2014 UP_{54}	—	September 19, 2003	Palomar	NEAT	·	3.2 km	MPC · JPL
733732	2014 UQ_{60}	—	October 18, 2014	Mount Lemmon	Mount Lemmon Survey	·	2.2 km	MPC · JPL
733733	2014 UL_{61}	—	February 13, 2011	Mount Lemmon	Mount Lemmon Survey	·	1.2 km	MPC · JPL
733734	2014 UJ_{62}	—	September 24, 2008	Kitt Peak	Spacewatch	·	2.5 km	MPC · JPL
733735	2014 UV_{62}	—	October 25, 2003	Kitt Peak	Spacewatch	·	2.3 km	MPC · JPL
733736	2014 UW_{63}	—	September 29, 2014	Haleakala	Pan-STARRS 1	·	2.4 km	MPC · JPL
733737	2014 UP_{64}	—	October 22, 2009	Catalina	CSS	NAE	4.3 km	MPC · JPL
733738	2014 UR_{65}	—	October 22, 2009	Mount Lemmon	Mount Lemmon Survey	LIX	3.4 km	MPC · JPL
733739	2014 UC_{67}	—	September 22, 2003	Kitt Peak	Spacewatch	EOS	2.0 km	MPC · JPL
733740	2014 US_{69}	—	June 18, 2013	Haleakala	Pan-STARRS 1	·	1.9 km	MPC · JPL
733741	2014 UU_{70}	—	October 22, 2003	Kitt Peak	Spacewatch	·	2.5 km	MPC · JPL
733742	2014 UJ_{73}	—	April 19, 2012	Mount Lemmon	Mount Lemmon Survey	·	2.0 km	MPC · JPL
733743	2014 UP_{75}	—	May 14, 2012	Mount Lemmon	Mount Lemmon Survey	·	2.4 km	MPC · JPL
733744	2014 UA_{77}	—	October 13, 2014	Mount Lemmon	Mount Lemmon Survey	EOS	1.6 km	MPC · JPL
733745	2014 UF_{80}	—	October 13, 2014	Mount Lemmon	Mount Lemmon Survey	EOS	1.6 km	MPC · JPL
733746	2014 UN_{81}	—	December 10, 2009	Mount Lemmon	Mount Lemmon Survey	·	1.6 km	MPC · JPL
733747	2014 UM_{82}	—	October 2, 2014	Kitt Peak	Spacewatch	EOS	1.4 km	MPC · JPL
733748	2014 UV_{87}	—	October 14, 2014	Kitt Peak	Spacewatch	·	2.2 km	MPC · JPL
733749	2014 UD_{94}	—	October 19, 1995	Kitt Peak	Spacewatch	·	710 m	MPC · JPL
733750	2014 UU_{96}	—	October 2, 2014	Mount Lemmon	Mount Lemmon Survey	EOS	1.5 km	MPC · JPL
733751	2014 UN_{97}	—	January 10, 2010	Mount Lemmon	Mount Lemmon Survey	·	2.6 km	MPC · JPL
733752	2014 UW_{97}	—	November 4, 2004	Kitt Peak	Spacewatch	·	1.4 km	MPC · JPL
733753	2014 UL_{98}	—	October 15, 2014	Kitt Peak	Spacewatch	·	2.4 km	MPC · JPL
733754	2014 UJ_{101}	—	November 20, 2009	Kitt Peak	Spacewatch	·	2.1 km	MPC · JPL
733755	2014 UF_{104}	—	September 26, 2003	Apache Point	SDSS Collaboration	·	2.4 km	MPC · JPL
733756	2014 UR_{105}	—	May 4, 2002	Kitt Peak	Spacewatch	·	2.2 km	MPC · JPL
733757	2014 UW_{105}	—	October 10, 2008	Mount Lemmon	Mount Lemmon Survey	·	3.2 km	MPC · JPL
733758	2014 US_{107}	—	October 24, 2014	Mount Lemmon	Mount Lemmon Survey	·	2.1 km	MPC · JPL
733759	2014 UC_{108}	—	February 14, 2007	Mauna Kea	P. A. Wiegert	·	1.5 km	MPC · JPL
733760	2014 UP_{108}	—	March 19, 2009	Kitt Peak	Spacewatch	·	650 m	MPC · JPL
733761	2014 UR_{110}	—	March 4, 2006	Mount Lemmon	Mount Lemmon Survey	EMA	2.9 km	MPC · JPL
733762	2014 UG_{112}	—	November 23, 2009	Mount Lemmon	Mount Lemmon Survey	·	1.7 km	MPC · JPL
733763	2014 UO_{112}	—	October 29, 2003	Kitt Peak	Spacewatch	·	3.2 km	MPC · JPL
733764	2014 US_{112}	—	September 29, 2008	Mount Lemmon	Mount Lemmon Survey	·	2.7 km	MPC · JPL
733765	2014 UH_{119}	—	February 20, 2006	Kitt Peak	Spacewatch	·	1.8 km	MPC · JPL
733766	2014 UL_{120}	—	September 17, 2009	Mount Lemmon	Mount Lemmon Survey	·	1.5 km	MPC · JPL
733767	2014 UU_{120}	—	September 30, 2014	Mount Lemmon	Mount Lemmon Survey	EOS	1.4 km	MPC · JPL
733768	2014 UR_{122}	—	June 28, 2010	WISE	WISE	·	1.5 km	MPC · JPL
733769	2014 UJ_{123}	—	February 8, 2000	Apache Point	SDSS	·	2.8 km	MPC · JPL
733770	2014 UR_{126}	—	September 5, 2007	Catalina	CSS	·	4.7 km	MPC · JPL
733771	2014 UH_{130}	—	October 10, 2008	Mount Lemmon	Mount Lemmon Survey	LUT	2.9 km	MPC · JPL
733772	2014 UM_{131}	—	March 21, 2010	WISE	WISE	·	2.6 km	MPC · JPL
733773	2014 UH_{133}	—	August 27, 2009	Kitt Peak	Spacewatch	·	1.4 km	MPC · JPL
733774	2014 UO_{133}	—	November 4, 2004	Kitt Peak	Spacewatch	·	610 m	MPC · JPL
733775	2014 UK_{136}	—	March 20, 2010	WISE	WISE	·	1.9 km	MPC · JPL
733776	2014 UQ_{137}	—	October 3, 2014	Mount Lemmon	Mount Lemmon Survey	·	1.7 km	MPC · JPL
733777	2014 UG_{138}	—	October 3, 2014	Mount Lemmon	Mount Lemmon Survey	·	2.9 km	MPC · JPL
733778	2014 UP_{138}	—	October 25, 2014	Kitt Peak	Spacewatch	·	2.3 km	MPC · JPL
733779	2014 UB_{141}	—	October 6, 2008	Mount Lemmon	Mount Lemmon Survey	·	3.1 km	MPC · JPL
733780	2014 UE_{143}	—	September 5, 2008	Kitt Peak	Spacewatch	·	3.1 km	MPC · JPL
733781	2014 UW_{145}	—	April 30, 2012	Kitt Peak	Spacewatch	·	2.7 km	MPC · JPL
733782	2014 UQ_{149}	—	March 7, 2010	WISE	WISE	·	3.4 km	MPC · JPL
733783	2014 UT_{149}	—	September 11, 2007	Catalina	CSS	·	680 m	MPC · JPL
733784	2014 UU_{149}	—	October 25, 2014	Kitt Peak	Spacewatch	·	590 m	MPC · JPL
733785	2014 UB_{150}	—	October 31, 1999	Kitt Peak	Spacewatch	·	1.6 km	MPC · JPL
733786	2014 UN_{150}	—	September 27, 2009	Mount Lemmon	Mount Lemmon Survey	·	1.8 km	MPC · JPL
733787	2014 UA_{152}	—	August 28, 2003	Palomar	NEAT	EOS	1.8 km	MPC · JPL
733788	2014 UG_{155}	—	November 17, 2004	Campo Imperatore	CINEOS	·	590 m	MPC · JPL
733789	2014 UN_{159}	—	October 25, 2014	Haleakala	Pan-STARRS 1	·	660 m	MPC · JPL
733790	2014 UX_{159}	—	June 7, 2010	WISE	WISE	·	1.1 km	MPC · JPL
733791	2014 US_{165}	—	July 9, 2013	Haleakala	Pan-STARRS 1	·	1.7 km	MPC · JPL
733792	2014 UA_{167}	—	July 28, 2009	Kitt Peak	Spacewatch	·	1.6 km	MPC · JPL
733793	2014 UO_{168}	—	September 24, 2008	Kitt Peak	Spacewatch	·	2.1 km	MPC · JPL
733794	2014 UO_{170}	—	October 2, 2006	Mount Lemmon	Mount Lemmon Survey	KON	1.9 km	MPC · JPL
733795	2014 UU_{171}	—	November 25, 2009	Mount Lemmon	Mount Lemmon Survey	·	2.7 km	MPC · JPL
733796	2014 UK_{172}	—	December 14, 2004	Kitt Peak	Spacewatch	·	1.9 km	MPC · JPL
733797	2014 UT_{172}	—	October 28, 2014	Mount Lemmon	Mount Lemmon Survey	·	2.6 km	MPC · JPL
733798	2014 UQ_{174}	—	November 12, 2001	Apache Point	SDSS Collaboration	·	1.3 km	MPC · JPL
733799	2014 UA_{175}	—	November 18, 2009	Kitt Peak	Spacewatch	·	2.0 km	MPC · JPL
733800	2014 UT_{176}	—	March 19, 2010	WISE	WISE	·	2.6 km	MPC · JPL

== 733801–733900 ==
back to top

Designation			Discovery			Properties		Ref
Permanent	Provisional	Named after	Date	Site	Discoverer(s)	Category	Diam.	Ref
733801	2014 UP_{178}	—	September 12, 2007	Mount Lemmon	Mount Lemmon Survey	·	550 m	MPC · JPL
733802	2014 UH_{179}	—	September 17, 2003	Kitt Peak	Spacewatch	·	2.0 km	MPC · JPL
733803	2014 UE_{180}	—	August 16, 1995	Haleakala	AMOS	DOR	2.2 km	MPC · JPL
733804	2014 UE_{182}	—	November 27, 2009	Mount Lemmon	Mount Lemmon Survey	·	1.3 km	MPC · JPL
733805	2014 UD_{186}	—	March 9, 2011	Mount Lemmon	Mount Lemmon Survey	·	2.7 km	MPC · JPL
733806	2014 UP_{187}	—	October 28, 2014	Haleakala	Pan-STARRS 1	·	660 m	MPC · JPL
733807	2014 UD_{189}	—	September 19, 2003	Palomar	NEAT	·	2.8 km	MPC · JPL
733808	2014 UA_{195}	—	September 18, 2014	Haleakala	Pan-STARRS 1	·	1.3 km	MPC · JPL
733809	2014 UG_{196}	—	September 23, 2014	Mount Lemmon	Mount Lemmon Survey	·	2.2 km	MPC · JPL
733810	2014 UH_{196}	—	October 5, 2014	Mount Lemmon	Mount Lemmon Survey	VER	2.1 km	MPC · JPL
733811	2014 UF_{201}	—	March 17, 2005	Mount Lemmon	Mount Lemmon Survey	VER	2.2 km	MPC · JPL
733812	2014 UY_{201}	—	October 28, 2014	Haleakala	Pan-STARRS 1	·	1.9 km	MPC · JPL
733813	2014 UJ_{202}	—	March 14, 2010	WISE	WISE	LIX	2.9 km	MPC · JPL
733814	2014 UX_{203}	—	March 3, 2000	Kitt Peak	Spacewatch	·	2.5 km	MPC · JPL
733815	2014 UJ_{204}	—	December 30, 2007	Kitt Peak	Spacewatch	·	1.1 km	MPC · JPL
733816	2014 UV_{205}	—	August 23, 2008	Kitt Peak	Spacewatch	HYG	2.7 km	MPC · JPL
733817	2014 UR_{207}	—	March 19, 2010	WISE	WISE	·	2.5 km	MPC · JPL
733818	2014 UA_{209}	—	April 17, 2008	Mount Lemmon	Mount Lemmon Survey	L5	20 km	MPC · JPL
733819	2014 UP_{211}	—	October 26, 2009	Mount Lemmon	Mount Lemmon Survey	·	3.0 km	MPC · JPL
733820	2014 UC_{212}	—	March 13, 2007	Mount Lemmon	Mount Lemmon Survey	·	1.8 km	MPC · JPL
733821	2014 UG_{212}	—	May 4, 2009	Mount Lemmon	Mount Lemmon Survey	·	2.1 km	MPC · JPL
733822	2014 UT_{212}	—	September 19, 2009	Mount Lemmon	Mount Lemmon Survey	·	2.7 km	MPC · JPL
733823	2014 UY_{213}	—	September 6, 2008	Catalina	CSS	·	4.5 km	MPC · JPL
733824	2014 UL_{215}	—	May 9, 2007	Kitt Peak	Spacewatch	LIX	3.9 km	MPC · JPL
733825	2014 UN_{215}	—	April 25, 2010	WISE	WISE	·	3.1 km	MPC · JPL
733826	2014 UG_{217}	—	January 4, 2010	Kitt Peak	Spacewatch	·	2.8 km	MPC · JPL
733827	2014 UR_{217}	—	July 8, 2003	Palomar	NEAT	·	3.4 km	MPC · JPL
733828	2014 UT_{217}	—	November 22, 2009	Mount Lemmon	Mount Lemmon Survey	·	4.3 km	MPC · JPL
733829	2014 UV_{217}	—	November 25, 2009	Mount Lemmon	Mount Lemmon Survey	·	3.4 km	MPC · JPL
733830	2014 UA_{218}	—	August 11, 2008	Črni Vrh	Skvarč, J.	·	3.0 km	MPC · JPL
733831	2014 UK_{223}	—	October 25, 2014	Space Surveillance	Space Surveillance Telescope	PHO	930 m	MPC · JPL
733832	2014 UJ_{227}	—	December 2, 2010	Catalina	CSS	·	1.1 km	MPC · JPL
733833	2014 UQ_{227}	—	October 11, 2010	Mount Lemmon	Mount Lemmon Survey	·	1.0 km	MPC · JPL
733834	2014 UQ_{230}	—	September 14, 2007	Mount Lemmon	Mount Lemmon Survey	·	3.1 km	MPC · JPL
733835	2014 UA_{232}	—	July 16, 2013	Haleakala	Pan-STARRS 1	·	1.4 km	MPC · JPL
733836	2014 UC_{232}	—	October 22, 2014	Kitt Peak	Spacewatch	·	1.5 km	MPC · JPL
733837	2014 UM_{232}	—	December 10, 2009	Mount Lemmon	Mount Lemmon Survey	·	2.8 km	MPC · JPL
733838	2014 UA_{233}	—	October 24, 2014	Kitt Peak	Spacewatch	EOS	1.4 km	MPC · JPL
733839	2014 UN_{233}	—	October 16, 2014	Mount Lemmon	Mount Lemmon Survey	EOS	1.4 km	MPC · JPL
733840	2014 UU_{233}	—	July 16, 2013	Haleakala	Pan-STARRS 1	EOS	1.5 km	MPC · JPL
733841	2014 UQ_{236}	—	October 26, 2014	Mount Lemmon	Mount Lemmon Survey	·	1.2 km	MPC · JPL
733842	2014 UL_{239}	—	October 29, 2014	Haleakala	Pan-STARRS 1	·	2.6 km	MPC · JPL
733843	2014 UT_{240}	—	February 26, 2011	Mount Lemmon	Mount Lemmon Survey	·	1.4 km	MPC · JPL
733844	2014 UZ_{240}	—	March 19, 2007	Mount Lemmon	Mount Lemmon Survey	EOS	1.8 km	MPC · JPL
733845	2014 UE_{255}	—	October 31, 2014	Mount Lemmon	Mount Lemmon Survey	·	1.3 km	MPC · JPL
733846	2014 UT_{255}	—	October 28, 2014	Haleakala	Pan-STARRS 1	·	2.0 km	MPC · JPL
733847	2014 UZ_{260}	—	October 28, 2014	Haleakala	Pan-STARRS 1	·	1.6 km	MPC · JPL
733848	2014 UG_{261}	—	October 28, 2014	Haleakala	Pan-STARRS 1	·	630 m	MPC · JPL
733849	2014 UY_{261}	—	October 15, 2014	Kitt Peak	Spacewatch	KOR	1.2 km	MPC · JPL
733850	2014 UB_{274}	—	October 16, 2014	Kitt Peak	Spacewatch	·	530 m	MPC · JPL
733851	2014 UM_{276}	—	October 22, 2005	Kitt Peak	Spacewatch	AGN	920 m	MPC · JPL
733852	2014 UL_{280}	—	October 28, 2014	Haleakala	Pan-STARRS 1	·	550 m	MPC · JPL
733853	2014 UR_{282}	—	March 6, 2011	Bergisch Gladbach	W. Bickel	·	2.1 km	MPC · JPL
733854	2014 US_{283}	—	November 9, 2009	Mount Lemmon	Mount Lemmon Survey	EOS	1.6 km	MPC · JPL
733855	2014 VJ	—	August 21, 2008	Kitt Peak	Spacewatch	·	2.0 km	MPC · JPL
733856	2014 VM_{3}	—	August 3, 2008	Siding Spring	SSS	·	2.5 km	MPC · JPL
733857	2014 VS_{3}	—	February 16, 2010	WISE	WISE	·	3.0 km	MPC · JPL
733858	2014 VF_{4}	—	October 17, 2014	Mount Lemmon	Mount Lemmon Survey	·	520 m	MPC · JPL
733859	2014 VL_{4}	—	July 5, 2003	Kitt Peak	Spacewatch	·	1.8 km	MPC · JPL
733860	2014 VR_{6}	—	December 19, 2003	Kitt Peak	Spacewatch	·	1.4 km	MPC · JPL
733861	2014 VK_{8}	—	March 12, 2011	Mount Lemmon	Mount Lemmon Survey	·	1.5 km	MPC · JPL
733862	2014 VH_{10}	—	August 5, 2008	Siding Spring	SSS	·	4.2 km	MPC · JPL
733863	2014 VZ_{13}	—	March 8, 2005	Catalina	CSS	·	3.1 km	MPC · JPL
733864	2014 VJ_{14}	—	November 10, 2009	Kitt Peak	Spacewatch	·	1.9 km	MPC · JPL
733865	2014 VO_{14}	—	April 8, 2002	Cerro Tololo	Deep Ecliptic Survey	·	5.6 km	MPC · JPL
733866	2014 VW_{15}	—	October 21, 2014	Mount Lemmon	Mount Lemmon Survey	EOS	1.6 km	MPC · JPL
733867	2014 VD_{21}	—	October 20, 2003	Kitt Peak	Spacewatch	·	2.0 km	MPC · JPL
733868	2014 VE_{26}	—	October 1, 2008	Kitt Peak	Spacewatch	·	2.8 km	MPC · JPL
733869	2014 VP_{27}	—	October 23, 2003	Kitt Peak	Spacewatch	EOS	1.9 km	MPC · JPL
733870	2014 VC_{30}	—	October 3, 2014	Mount Lemmon	Mount Lemmon Survey	·	1.6 km	MPC · JPL
733871	2014 VE_{31}	—	September 24, 2008	Mount Lemmon	Mount Lemmon Survey	·	2.5 km	MPC · JPL
733872	2014 VQ_{31}	—	November 19, 2009	Kitt Peak	Spacewatch	·	1.6 km	MPC · JPL
733873	2014 VS_{34}	—	November 19, 2009	Mount Lemmon	Mount Lemmon Survey	·	1.8 km	MPC · JPL
733874	2014 VL_{35}	—	August 31, 2014	Haleakala	Pan-STARRS 1	·	1.4 km	MPC · JPL
733875	2014 VR_{36}	—	April 10, 2010	WISE	WISE	·	2.3 km	MPC · JPL
733876	2014 VA_{38}	—	September 16, 2003	Palomar	NEAT	H	620 m	MPC · JPL
733877	2014 VL_{39}	—	September 23, 2008	Kitt Peak	Spacewatch	THM	2.0 km	MPC · JPL
733878	2014 VN_{42}	—	November 1, 2014	Mount Lemmon	Mount Lemmon Survey	·	2.5 km	MPC · JPL
733879	2014 WD_{2}	—	October 25, 2005	Mount Lemmon	Mount Lemmon Survey	·	2.2 km	MPC · JPL
733880	2014 WN_{2}	—	September 23, 2008	Kitt Peak	Spacewatch	·	2.1 km	MPC · JPL
733881	2014 WV_{2}	—	December 3, 2003	Anderson Mesa	LONEOS	·	4.6 km	MPC · JPL
733882	2014 WW_{3}	—	March 21, 2010	WISE	WISE	·	2.3 km	MPC · JPL
733883	2014 WX_{8}	—	September 12, 2001	Kitt Peak	Spacewatch	·	630 m	MPC · JPL
733884	2014 WJ_{10}	—	September 14, 2007	Mount Lemmon	Mount Lemmon Survey	(2076)	540 m	MPC · JPL
733885	2014 WL_{10}	—	October 17, 2014	Kitt Peak	Spacewatch	EOS	1.4 km	MPC · JPL
733886	2014 WF_{13}	—	October 21, 2014	Kitt Peak	Spacewatch	·	510 m	MPC · JPL
733887	2014 WU_{15}	—	September 18, 2009	Kitt Peak	Spacewatch	·	1.7 km	MPC · JPL
733888	2014 WB_{17}	—	April 2, 2011	Mount Lemmon	Mount Lemmon Survey	·	2.4 km	MPC · JPL
733889	2014 WH_{17}	—	November 4, 2007	Kitt Peak	Spacewatch	V	480 m	MPC · JPL
733890	2014 WS_{17}	—	December 20, 2009	Mount Lemmon	Mount Lemmon Survey	·	2.1 km	MPC · JPL
733891	2014 WD_{19}	—	July 28, 2007	Mauna Kea	P. A. Wiegert, N. I. Hasan	EUP	4.4 km	MPC · JPL
733892	2014 WU_{20}	—	November 17, 2014	Mount Lemmon	Mount Lemmon Survey	·	550 m	MPC · JPL
733893	2014 WM_{22}	—	November 19, 2003	Kitt Peak	Spacewatch	LIX	3.1 km	MPC · JPL
733894	2014 WY_{22}	—	March 21, 2010	WISE	WISE	·	2.4 km	MPC · JPL
733895	2014 WB_{24}	—	October 31, 2005	Kitt Peak	Spacewatch	WIT	910 m	MPC · JPL
733896	2014 WD_{27}	—	August 17, 2009	Kitt Peak	Spacewatch	AGN	1.0 km	MPC · JPL
733897	2014 WT_{29}	—	April 9, 2010	Kitt Peak	Spacewatch	·	670 m	MPC · JPL
733898	2014 WN_{33}	—	February 18, 2010	WISE	WISE	·	2.9 km	MPC · JPL
733899	2014 WJ_{38}	—	March 25, 2006	Palomar	NEAT	·	1.3 km	MPC · JPL
733900	2014 WO_{38}	—	July 31, 2009	Kitt Peak	Spacewatch	(13314)	1.7 km	MPC · JPL

== 733901–734000 ==
back to top

Designation			Discovery			Properties		Ref
Permanent	Provisional	Named after	Date	Site	Discoverer(s)	Category	Diam.	Ref
733901	2014 WV_{38}	—	October 25, 2014	Haleakala	Pan-STARRS 1	·	1.4 km	MPC · JPL
733902	2014 WG_{40}	—	November 17, 2014	Haleakala	Pan-STARRS 1	GEF	890 m	MPC · JPL
733903	2014 WS_{40}	—	April 19, 2006	Mount Lemmon	Mount Lemmon Survey	EOS	1.7 km	MPC · JPL
733904	2014 WM_{41}	—	December 27, 2011	Mount Lemmon	Mount Lemmon Survey	·	670 m	MPC · JPL
733905	2014 WH_{43}	—	November 19, 2003	Kitt Peak	Spacewatch	·	3.1 km	MPC · JPL
733906	2014 WU_{43}	—	April 6, 2010	WISE	WISE	·	3.6 km	MPC · JPL
733907	2014 WB_{45}	—	April 1, 2011	Kitt Peak	Spacewatch	·	2.2 km	MPC · JPL
733908	2014 WB_{50}	—	October 22, 2014	Kitt Peak	Spacewatch	·	2.7 km	MPC · JPL
733909	2014 WP_{54}	—	April 10, 2010	WISE	WISE	·	3.0 km	MPC · JPL
733910	2014 WA_{55}	—	December 13, 2010	Mount Lemmon	Mount Lemmon Survey	·	850 m	MPC · JPL
733911	2014 WN_{57}	—	February 16, 2010	Kitt Peak	Spacewatch	THM	1.8 km	MPC · JPL
733912	2014 WO_{64}	—	October 2, 2014	Mount Lemmon	Mount Lemmon Survey	·	2.1 km	MPC · JPL
733913	2014 WQ_{64}	—	September 21, 2008	Kitt Peak	Spacewatch	VER	2.8 km	MPC · JPL
733914	2014 WN_{67}	—	October 25, 2008	Kitt Peak	Spacewatch	·	2.9 km	MPC · JPL
733915	2014 WJ_{68}	—	March 27, 2010	WISE	WISE	·	2.5 km	MPC · JPL
733916	2014 WV_{71}	—	November 16, 2014	Mount Lemmon	Mount Lemmon Survey	EOS	1.7 km	MPC · JPL
733917	2014 WU_{72}	—	January 7, 2010	WISE	WISE	·	1.7 km	MPC · JPL
733918	2014 WG_{73}	—	November 17, 2014	Kitt Peak	Spacewatch	·	540 m	MPC · JPL
733919	2014 WS_{76}	—	July 9, 2013	Haleakala	Pan-STARRS 1	EOS	1.6 km	MPC · JPL
733920	2014 WQ_{79}	—	December 13, 2010	Mount Lemmon	Mount Lemmon Survey	·	1.0 km	MPC · JPL
733921	2014 WU_{81}	—	October 15, 2009	Mount Lemmon	Mount Lemmon Survey	AGN	980 m	MPC · JPL
733922	2014 WW_{82}	—	March 14, 2011	Kitt Peak	Spacewatch	·	2.1 km	MPC · JPL
733923	2014 WB_{83}	—	November 23, 1997	Kitt Peak	Spacewatch	VER	2.2 km	MPC · JPL
733924	2014 WV_{84}	—	September 1, 2005	Kitt Peak	Spacewatch	3:2	4.2 km	MPC · JPL
733925	2014 WJ_{88}	—	April 27, 2012	Haleakala	Pan-STARRS 1	·	1.5 km	MPC · JPL
733926	2014 WP_{88}	—	March 4, 2010	WISE	WISE	·	1.8 km	MPC · JPL
733927	2014 WH_{89}	—	November 17, 2014	Mount Lemmon	Mount Lemmon Survey	·	2.4 km	MPC · JPL
733928	2014 WP_{89}	—	April 22, 2007	Mount Lemmon	Mount Lemmon Survey	·	2.3 km	MPC · JPL
733929	2014 WQ_{89}	—	November 17, 2014	Mount Lemmon	Mount Lemmon Survey	·	730 m	MPC · JPL
733930	2014 WU_{89}	—	April 29, 2012	Mount Lemmon	Mount Lemmon Survey	·	2.6 km	MPC · JPL
733931	2014 WG_{90}	—	October 22, 2014	Kitt Peak	Spacewatch	·	2.1 km	MPC · JPL
733932	2014 WJ_{90}	—	November 17, 2009	Kitt Peak	Spacewatch	·	1.8 km	MPC · JPL
733933	2014 WB_{92}	—	November 2, 2007	Kitt Peak	Spacewatch	·	600 m	MPC · JPL
733934	2014 WV_{92}	—	May 28, 2008	Mount Lemmon	Mount Lemmon Survey	·	1.5 km	MPC · JPL
733935	2014 WY_{92}	—	January 7, 2010	Kitt Peak	Spacewatch	·	2.4 km	MPC · JPL
733936	2014 WO_{93}	—	May 16, 2012	Mount Lemmon	Mount Lemmon Survey	·	1.4 km	MPC · JPL
733937	2014 WY_{93}	—	November 24, 2009	Kitt Peak	Spacewatch	·	1.9 km	MPC · JPL
733938	2014 WX_{94}	—	March 6, 2011	Mount Lemmon	Mount Lemmon Survey	·	2.1 km	MPC · JPL
733939	2014 WZ_{96}	—	August 4, 2002	Palomar	NEAT	·	3.1 km	MPC · JPL
733940	2014 WB_{97}	—	November 17, 2014	Mount Lemmon	Mount Lemmon Survey	·	720 m	MPC · JPL
733941	2014 WS_{100}	—	September 26, 2003	Apache Point	SDSS Collaboration	·	2.3 km	MPC · JPL
733942	2014 WR_{101}	—	May 1, 2012	Mount Lemmon	Mount Lemmon Survey	EOS	1.5 km	MPC · JPL
733943	2014 WN_{103}	—	March 10, 2003	Kitt Peak	Spacewatch	·	1.4 km	MPC · JPL
733944	2014 WQ_{105}	—	October 2, 2014	Haleakala	Pan-STARRS 1	·	1.4 km	MPC · JPL
733945	2014 WC_{107}	—	November 18, 2014	Mount Lemmon	Mount Lemmon Survey	·	1.4 km	MPC · JPL
733946	2014 WK_{109}	—	September 5, 2008	Kitt Peak	Spacewatch	·	1.9 km	MPC · JPL
733947	2014 WP_{111}	—	October 25, 2014	Kitt Peak	Spacewatch	KOR	1.0 km	MPC · JPL
733948	2014 WN_{114}	—	January 10, 2006	Mount Lemmon	Mount Lemmon Survey	·	3.4 km	MPC · JPL
733949	2014 WA_{115}	—	February 28, 2010	WISE	WISE	·	2.0 km	MPC · JPL
733950	2014 WS_{115}	—	March 2, 2006	Kitt Peak	Spacewatch	·	2.2 km	MPC · JPL
733951	2014 WP_{116}	—	September 24, 2014	Kitt Peak	Spacewatch	·	1.9 km	MPC · JPL
733952	2014 WH_{117}	—	January 13, 2010	Mount Lemmon	Mount Lemmon Survey	·	3.3 km	MPC · JPL
733953	2014 WA_{119}	—	November 20, 2014	Mount Lemmon	Mount Lemmon Survey	·	3.0 km	MPC · JPL
733954	2014 WL_{119}	—	March 16, 2010	WISE	WISE	EUP	3.6 km	MPC · JPL
733955	2014 WT_{119}	—	January 12, 2006	Palomar	NEAT	L5	20 km	MPC · JPL
733956	2014 WA_{120}	—	October 26, 2014	Haleakala	Pan-STARRS 1	L5	10 km	MPC · JPL
733957	2014 WS_{122}	—	October 24, 2008	Kitt Peak	Spacewatch	·	2.5 km	MPC · JPL
733958	2014 WX_{122}	—	January 4, 2003	Kitt Peak	Spacewatch	·	940 m	MPC · JPL
733959	2014 WX_{123}	—	November 16, 2014	Mount Lemmon	Mount Lemmon Survey	L5	7.7 km	MPC · JPL
733960	2014 WW_{124}	—	March 25, 2010	WISE	WISE	·	2.2 km	MPC · JPL
733961	2014 WL_{126}	—	October 9, 2008	Mount Lemmon	Mount Lemmon Survey	·	2.2 km	MPC · JPL
733962	2014 WN_{126}	—	November 16, 2014	Mount Lemmon	Mount Lemmon Survey	·	2.1 km	MPC · JPL
733963	2014 WE_{127}	—	November 16, 2014	Mount Lemmon	Mount Lemmon Survey	·	2.5 km	MPC · JPL
733964	2014 WO_{129}	—	February 15, 2010	WISE	WISE	EOS	2.1 km	MPC · JPL
733965	2014 WK_{131}	—	February 13, 2002	Apache Point	SDSS Collaboration	·	2.2 km	MPC · JPL
733966	2014 WR_{132}	—	October 16, 2009	Mount Lemmon	Mount Lemmon Survey	·	1.4 km	MPC · JPL
733967	2014 WU_{132}	—	October 2, 2008	Mount Lemmon	Mount Lemmon Survey	THM	1.5 km	MPC · JPL
733968	2014 WZ_{136}	—	October 10, 2008	Mount Lemmon	Mount Lemmon Survey	·	2.1 km	MPC · JPL
733969	2014 WU_{137}	—	November 17, 2014	Haleakala	Pan-STARRS 1	·	2.2 km	MPC · JPL
733970	2014 WG_{140}	—	November 17, 2014	Haleakala	Pan-STARRS 1	·	2.5 km	MPC · JPL
733971	2014 WH_{144}	—	October 8, 2007	Mount Lemmon	Mount Lemmon Survey	·	530 m	MPC · JPL
733972	2014 WG_{145}	—	March 4, 2005	Catalina	CSS	·	4.3 km	MPC · JPL
733973	2014 WH_{147}	—	October 15, 2014	Mount Lemmon	Mount Lemmon Survey	·	2.0 km	MPC · JPL
733974	2014 WT_{149}	—	October 25, 2014	Mount Lemmon	Mount Lemmon Survey	·	2.7 km	MPC · JPL
733975	2014 WE_{151}	—	October 24, 2014	Kitt Peak	Spacewatch	·	1.6 km	MPC · JPL
733976	2014 WT_{155}	—	November 4, 2007	Mount Lemmon	Mount Lemmon Survey	V	510 m	MPC · JPL
733977	2014 WJ_{159}	—	March 6, 2010	WISE	WISE	·	2.8 km	MPC · JPL
733978	2014 WY_{162}	—	October 24, 2008	Mount Lemmon	Mount Lemmon Survey	·	2.4 km	MPC · JPL
733979	2014 WK_{163}	—	October 22, 2003	Kitt Peak	Spacewatch	·	2.2 km	MPC · JPL
733980	2014 WF_{164}	—	October 9, 2004	Kitt Peak	Spacewatch	·	1.6 km	MPC · JPL
733981	2014 WP_{167}	—	October 23, 2003	Kitt Peak	Spacewatch	·	1.1 km	MPC · JPL
733982	2014 WV_{167}	—	April 12, 2005	Mount Lemmon	Mount Lemmon Survey	·	3.3 km	MPC · JPL
733983	2014 WV_{168}	—	September 14, 2007	Mount Lemmon	Mount Lemmon Survey	·	540 m	MPC · JPL
733984	2014 WU_{174}	—	January 19, 2004	Kitt Peak	Spacewatch	·	1.1 km	MPC · JPL
733985	2014 WH_{177}	—	October 22, 2014	Kitt Peak	Spacewatch	·	1.6 km	MPC · JPL
733986	2014 WM_{178}	—	September 28, 2009	Mount Lemmon	Mount Lemmon Survey	·	1.9 km	MPC · JPL
733987	2014 WT_{178}	—	April 20, 2013	Kitt Peak	Spacewatch	·	720 m	MPC · JPL
733988	2014 WM_{179}	—	October 2, 2014	Haleakala	Pan-STARRS 1	·	520 m	MPC · JPL
733989	2014 WF_{180}	—	March 29, 2010	WISE	WISE	·	2.8 km	MPC · JPL
733990	2014 WQ_{180}	—	October 2, 2014	Haleakala	Pan-STARRS 1	·	2.5 km	MPC · JPL
733991	2014 WH_{182}	—	September 18, 2003	Palomar	NEAT	·	2.4 km	MPC · JPL
733992	2014 WK_{183}	—	September 21, 2009	Kitt Peak	Spacewatch	·	1.7 km	MPC · JPL
733993	2014 WZ_{185}	—	July 30, 2010	WISE	WISE	PHO	730 m	MPC · JPL
733994	2014 WO_{186}	—	November 20, 2014	Haleakala	Pan-STARRS 1	·	2.4 km	MPC · JPL
733995	2014 WX_{187}	—	July 14, 2001	Palomar	NEAT	·	1.4 km	MPC · JPL
733996	2014 WJ_{188}	—	November 20, 2014	Haleakala	Pan-STARRS 1	·	1.7 km	MPC · JPL
733997	2014 WL_{188}	—	November 20, 2014	Haleakala	Pan-STARRS 1	V	370 m	MPC · JPL
733998	2014 WU_{189}	—	November 20, 2014	Haleakala	Pan-STARRS 1	EOS	1.5 km	MPC · JPL
733999	2014 WP_{191}	—	November 18, 2003	Kitt Peak	Spacewatch	·	4.4 km	MPC · JPL
734000	2014 WM_{194}	—	March 16, 2010	WISE	WISE	·	3.0 km	MPC · JPL

back to top

== Meaning of names ==
As minor planet discoveries are confirmed, they are given a permanent number by the IAU's Minor Planet Center (MPC), and the discoverers can then submit names for them, following the IAU's naming conventions. The list below concerns those minor planets in the specified number-range that have received names, and explains the meanings of those names.

Official naming citations of newly named small Solar System bodies are approved and published in a bulletin by IAU's Working Group for Small Bodies Nomenclature (WGSBN). Before May 2021, citations were published in MPC's Minor Planet Circulars for many decades. Recent citations can also be found on the JPL Small-Body Database (SBDB). Until his death in 2016, German astronomer Lutz D. Schmadel compiled these citations into the Dictionary of Minor Planet Names (DMP) and regularly updated the collection.

Based on Paul Herget's The Names of the Minor Planets, Schmadel also researched the unclear origin of numerous asteroids, most of which had been named prior to World War II. This article incorporates text from this source, which is in the public domain: SBDB New namings may only be added to this list below after official publication as the preannouncement of names is condemned. The WGSBN publishes a comprehensive guideline for the naming rules of non-cometary small Solar System bodies.

Named minor planet	Provisional	This minor planet was named for...	Ref · Catalog
733086 Virgiliupop	2014 OZ_{398}	Virgiliu Pop, Romanian space lawyer and educator.	IAU · 733086
733173 Mārīteeglīte	2014 QP_{21}	Mārīte Eglīte, Latvian astronomer	IAU · 733173
