= List of minor planets: 727001–728000 =

The following is a partial list of minor planets, running from minor-planet number 727001 through 728000, inclusive. The primary data for this and other partial lists is based on JPL's "Small-Body Orbital Elements" and data available from the Minor Planet Center. Critical list information is also provided by the MPC, unless otherwise specified from Lowell Observatory. A detailed description of the table's columns and additional sources are given on the main page including a complete list of every page in this series, and a statistical break-up on the dynamical classification of minor planets.

Also see the summary list of all named bodies in numerical and alphabetical order, and the corresponding naming citations for the number range of this particular list. New namings may only be added to this list after official publication, as the preannouncement of names is condemned by the Working Group for Small Bodies Nomenclature of the International Astronomical Union.

Near-Earth obj.	MBA (inner)	MBA (outer)	Centaur
Mars-crosser	MBA (middle)	Jupiter trojan	Trans-Neptunian obj.
Unclassified

== 727001–727100 ==
Designation			Discovery			Properties		Ref
Permanent	Provisional	Named after	Date	Site	Discoverer(s)	Category	Diam.	Ref
727001	2010 CB_{274}	—	February 15, 2010	Mount Lemmon	Mount Lemmon Survey	·	3.0 km	MPC · JPL
727002	2010 CU_{274}	—	February 13, 2010	Mount Lemmon	Mount Lemmon Survey	·	520 m	MPC · JPL
727003	2010 CG_{275}	—	February 14, 2010	Mount Lemmon	Mount Lemmon Survey	·	1.4 km	MPC · JPL
727004	2010 CQ_{275}	—	February 14, 2010	Mount Lemmon	Mount Lemmon Survey	·	2.4 km	MPC · JPL
727005	2010 CV_{275}	—	February 15, 2010	Kitt Peak	Spacewatch	·	2.4 km	MPC · JPL
727006	2010 CV_{276}	—	January 1, 2014	Haleakala	Pan-STARRS 1	·	1.1 km	MPC · JPL
727007	2010 DW_{2}	—	January 5, 2010	Kitt Peak	Spacewatch	·	2.8 km	MPC · JPL
727008	2010 DJ_{7}	—	February 9, 2010	Kitt Peak	Spacewatch	·	2.4 km	MPC · JPL
727009	2010 DY_{9}	—	February 16, 2010	Mount Lemmon	Mount Lemmon Survey	EOS	1.6 km	MPC · JPL
727010	2010 DG_{11}	—	December 19, 2004	Mount Lemmon	Mount Lemmon Survey	·	3.3 km	MPC · JPL
727011	2010 DT_{12}	—	February 17, 2010	WISE	WISE	·	4.1 km	MPC · JPL
727012	2010 DU_{12}	—	February 17, 2010	WISE	WISE	L4	11 km	MPC · JPL
727013	2010 DQ_{13}	—	November 24, 2009	Mount Lemmon	Mount Lemmon Survey	·	4.0 km	MPC · JPL
727014	2010 DT_{18}	—	February 16, 2010	WISE	WISE	·	2.1 km	MPC · JPL
727015	2010 DL_{19}	—	February 16, 2010	WISE	WISE	·	3.2 km	MPC · JPL
727016	2010 DJ_{20}	—	February 17, 2010	WISE	WISE	·	2.0 km	MPC · JPL
727017	2010 DA_{21}	—	November 26, 2009	Mount Lemmon	Mount Lemmon Survey	PHO	1.1 km	MPC · JPL
727018	2010 DG_{22}	—	February 18, 2010	WISE	WISE	·	3.7 km	MPC · JPL
727019	2010 DB_{23}	—	November 26, 2009	Mount Lemmon	Mount Lemmon Survey	·	2.8 km	MPC · JPL
727020	2010 DG_{23}	—	January 29, 2009	Mount Lemmon	Mount Lemmon Survey	·	2.4 km	MPC · JPL
727021	2010 DG_{24}	—	February 19, 2010	WISE	WISE	·	3.5 km	MPC · JPL
727022	2010 DO_{25}	—	February 19, 2010	WISE	WISE	(5)	2.2 km	MPC · JPL
727023	2010 DC_{27}	—	September 30, 2006	Mount Lemmon	Mount Lemmon Survey	·	2.7 km	MPC · JPL
727024	2010 DF_{28}	—	February 18, 2010	WISE	WISE	URS	3.5 km	MPC · JPL
727025	2010 DJ_{28}	—	February 18, 2010	WISE	WISE	T_{j} (2.96)	4.3 km	MPC · JPL
727026	2010 DO_{29}	—	February 19, 2010	WISE	WISE	·	3.0 km	MPC · JPL
727027	2010 DS_{32}	—	November 27, 2009	Mount Lemmon	Mount Lemmon Survey	·	3.3 km	MPC · JPL
727028	2010 DE_{33}	—	February 19, 2010	WISE	WISE	·	3.1 km	MPC · JPL
727029	2010 DF_{34}	—	September 5, 2008	Kitt Peak	Spacewatch	·	3.7 km	MPC · JPL
727030	2010 DQ_{34}	—	February 17, 2010	Mount Lemmon	Mount Lemmon Survey	·	2.4 km	MPC · JPL
727031	2010 DT_{34}	—	February 17, 2010	Catalina	CSS	PHO	840 m	MPC · JPL
727032	2010 DV_{37}	—	October 19, 2007	Kitt Peak	Spacewatch	·	3.6 km	MPC · JPL
727033	2010 DY_{37}	—	November 6, 2008	Mount Lemmon	Mount Lemmon Survey	3:2	4.3 km	MPC · JPL
727034	2010 DK_{43}	—	August 19, 2001	Cerro Tololo	Deep Ecliptic Survey	VER	2.5 km	MPC · JPL
727035	2010 DX_{44}	—	February 17, 2010	Kitt Peak	Spacewatch	·	1.1 km	MPC · JPL
727036	2010 DR_{49}	—	April 2, 2006	Vallemare Borbona	V. S. Casulli	·	1.1 km	MPC · JPL
727037	2010 DP_{50}	—	February 20, 2010	WISE	WISE	·	3.4 km	MPC · JPL
727038	2010 DF_{51}	—	December 3, 2008	Mount Lemmon	Mount Lemmon Survey	·	2.7 km	MPC · JPL
727039	2010 DX_{51}	—	February 21, 2010	WISE	WISE	EUP	3.9 km	MPC · JPL
727040	2010 DG_{52}	—	November 19, 2007	Mount Lemmon	Mount Lemmon Survey	URS	4.7 km	MPC · JPL
727041	2010 DH_{53}	—	September 18, 1995	Kitt Peak	Spacewatch	EMA	2.9 km	MPC · JPL
727042	2010 DL_{53}	—	February 22, 2010	WISE	WISE	·	3.9 km	MPC · JPL
727043	2010 DQ_{53}	—	February 23, 2010	WISE	WISE	·	2.1 km	MPC · JPL
727044	2010 DH_{55}	—	January 18, 2009	Kitt Peak	Spacewatch	·	3.4 km	MPC · JPL
727045	2010 DX_{55}	—	February 22, 2010	WISE	WISE	·	3.0 km	MPC · JPL
727046	2010 DO_{56}	—	October 8, 2007	Catalina	CSS	·	3.9 km	MPC · JPL
727047	2010 DC_{58}	—	February 24, 2010	WISE	WISE	·	3.0 km	MPC · JPL
727048	2010 DM_{58}	—	March 3, 2006	Kitt Peak	Spacewatch	·	1.9 km	MPC · JPL
727049	2010 DU_{60}	—	December 1, 2005	Mount Lemmon	Mount Lemmon Survey	ADE	2.1 km	MPC · JPL
727050	2010 DU_{62}	—	May 19, 2005	Mount Lemmon	Mount Lemmon Survey	LIX	3.9 km	MPC · JPL
727051	2010 DV_{62}	—	February 25, 2010	WISE	WISE	·	4.1 km	MPC · JPL
727052	2010 DJ_{63}	—	February 26, 2010	WISE	WISE	·	4.2 km	MPC · JPL
727053	2010 DA_{64}	—	February 26, 2010	WISE	WISE	·	3.3 km	MPC · JPL
727054	2010 DC_{64}	—	February 26, 2010	WISE	WISE	·	5.2 km	MPC · JPL
727055	2010 DG_{64}	—	February 26, 2010	WISE	WISE	·	4.0 km	MPC · JPL
727056	2010 DK_{64}	—	February 26, 2010	WISE	WISE	·	3.8 km	MPC · JPL
727057	2010 DP_{64}	—	September 30, 2003	Kitt Peak	Spacewatch	·	3.6 km	MPC · JPL
727058	2010 DR_{67}	—	February 27, 2010	WISE	WISE	·	3.2 km	MPC · JPL
727059	2010 DT_{67}	—	February 27, 2010	WISE	WISE	·	2.1 km	MPC · JPL
727060	2010 DM_{68}	—	February 27, 2010	WISE	WISE	·	3.2 km	MPC · JPL
727061	2010 DC_{69}	—	August 5, 2005	Palomar	NEAT	·	4.7 km	MPC · JPL
727062	2010 DX_{70}	—	November 27, 2009	Mount Lemmon	Mount Lemmon Survey	·	2.3 km	MPC · JPL
727063	2010 DC_{71}	—	February 28, 2010	WISE	WISE	·	4.3 km	MPC · JPL
727064	2010 DN_{72}	—	February 28, 2010	WISE	WISE	·	3.0 km	MPC · JPL
727065	2010 DR_{72}	—	November 27, 2009	Mount Lemmon	Mount Lemmon Survey	·	1.5 km	MPC · JPL
727066	2010 DJ_{73}	—	February 27, 2010	WISE	WISE	·	2.1 km	MPC · JPL
727067	2010 DT_{77}	—	February 16, 2010	Mount Lemmon	Mount Lemmon Survey	·	2.0 km	MPC · JPL
727068	2010 DR_{80}	—	October 18, 2012	Mount Lemmon	Mount Lemmon Survey	·	4.3 km	MPC · JPL
727069	2010 DH_{81}	—	February 17, 2010	WISE	WISE	·	3.1 km	MPC · JPL
727070	2010 DV_{81}	—	December 1, 2003	Kitt Peak	Spacewatch	·	4.4 km	MPC · JPL
727071	2010 DH_{82}	—	October 20, 2003	Kitt Peak	Spacewatch	·	3.5 km	MPC · JPL
727072	2010 DP_{82}	—	November 27, 2009	Kitt Peak	Spacewatch	·	4.7 km	MPC · JPL
727073	2010 DQ_{82}	—	January 6, 2010	Mount Lemmon	Mount Lemmon Survey	·	4.2 km	MPC · JPL
727074	2010 DP_{85}	—	May 21, 2010	Mount Lemmon	Mount Lemmon Survey	·	2.5 km	MPC · JPL
727075	2010 DT_{86}	—	February 26, 2010	WISE	WISE	·	3.2 km	MPC · JPL
727076	2010 DZ_{86}	—	September 18, 2011	Mount Lemmon	Mount Lemmon Survey	LIX	2.9 km	MPC · JPL
727077	2010 DA_{87}	—	February 22, 2006	Anderson Mesa	LONEOS	·	4.3 km	MPC · JPL
727078	2010 DG_{87}	—	September 2, 2008	Kitt Peak	Spacewatch	·	2.8 km	MPC · JPL
727079	2010 DY_{87}	—	November 27, 2009	Mount Lemmon	Mount Lemmon Survey	·	2.8 km	MPC · JPL
727080	2010 DG_{88}	—	December 11, 2009	Mount Lemmon	Mount Lemmon Survey	EOS	2.6 km	MPC · JPL
727081	2010 DN_{88}	—	February 27, 2010	WISE	WISE	·	2.7 km	MPC · JPL
727082	2010 DS_{88}	—	April 15, 1996	Kitt Peak	Spacewatch	·	2.6 km	MPC · JPL
727083	2010 DS_{89}	—	February 28, 2010	WISE	WISE	·	1.6 km	MPC · JPL
727084	2010 DT_{89}	—	February 28, 2010	WISE	WISE	·	2.9 km	MPC · JPL
727085	2010 DA_{90}	—	April 26, 2006	Kitt Peak	Spacewatch	·	4.3 km	MPC · JPL
727086	2010 DD_{90}	—	September 19, 2003	Palomar	NEAT	·	2.8 km	MPC · JPL
727087	2010 DD_{91}	—	February 28, 2010	WISE	WISE	·	3.1 km	MPC · JPL
727088	2010 DG_{91}	—	January 13, 2005	Catalina	CSS	·	3.2 km	MPC · JPL
727089	2010 DR_{95}	—	January 28, 2015	Haleakala	Pan-STARRS 1	ARM	2.8 km	MPC · JPL
727090	2010 DS_{108}	—	December 28, 2017	Mount Lemmon	Mount Lemmon Survey	·	1.2 km	MPC · JPL
727091	2010 DW_{108}	—	February 16, 2010	Mount Lemmon	Mount Lemmon Survey	TRE	2.8 km	MPC · JPL
727092	2010 DD_{110}	—	April 6, 2011	Mount Lemmon	Mount Lemmon Survey	·	2.5 km	MPC · JPL
727093	2010 DU_{110}	—	January 8, 2016	Haleakala	Pan-STARRS 1	(31811)	2.7 km	MPC · JPL
727094	2010 EJ	—	April 7, 2006	Kitt Peak	Spacewatch	·	3.8 km	MPC · JPL
727095	2010 ES_{1}	—	November 16, 2009	Kitt Peak	Spacewatch	·	3.7 km	MPC · JPL
727096	2010 EC_{3}	—	July 5, 2005	Siding Spring	SSS	·	5.4 km	MPC · JPL
727097	2010 EN_{4}	—	October 1, 2009	Mount Lemmon	Mount Lemmon Survey	·	2.4 km	MPC · JPL
727098	2010 EQ_{4}	—	November 27, 2009	Mount Lemmon	Mount Lemmon Survey	·	3.0 km	MPC · JPL
727099	2010 EB_{6}	—	March 2, 2010	WISE	WISE	·	1.2 km	MPC · JPL
727100	2010 EH_{6}	—	January 25, 2006	Kitt Peak	Spacewatch	GEF	2.3 km	MPC · JPL

== 727101–727200 ==
back to top

Designation			Discovery			Properties		Ref
Permanent	Provisional	Named after	Date	Site	Discoverer(s)	Category	Diam.	Ref
727101	2010 EL_{6}	—	December 20, 2009	Kitt Peak	Spacewatch	·	3.8 km	MPC · JPL
727102	2010 EN_{7}	—	December 23, 2005	Socorro	LINEAR	·	2.7 km	MPC · JPL
727103	2010 EO_{7}	—	March 3, 2010	WISE	WISE	·	2.4 km	MPC · JPL
727104	2010 EY_{7}	—	August 26, 2003	Cerro Tololo	Deep Ecliptic Survey	·	1.9 km	MPC · JPL
727105	2010 EO_{8}	—	March 3, 2010	WISE	WISE	(895)	4.0 km	MPC · JPL
727106	2010 EP_{8}	—	March 3, 2010	WISE	WISE	LUT	3.7 km	MPC · JPL
727107	2010 EW_{8}	—	March 15, 2005	Catalina	CSS	·	1.9 km	MPC · JPL
727108	2010 EA_{9}	—	November 10, 2009	Kitt Peak	Spacewatch	·	3.9 km	MPC · JPL
727109	2010 EC_{10}	—	September 6, 2008	Mount Lemmon	Mount Lemmon Survey	·	2.5 km	MPC · JPL
727110	2010 EQ_{10}	—	March 4, 2010	WISE	WISE	·	3.7 km	MPC · JPL
727111	2010 EM_{13}	—	March 5, 2010	WISE	WISE	T_{j} (2.97)	2.9 km	MPC · JPL
727112	2010 EN_{13}	—	March 5, 2010	WISE	WISE	·	1.8 km	MPC · JPL
727113	2010 ES_{13}	—	March 5, 2010	WISE	WISE	·	2.3 km	MPC · JPL
727114	2010 EY_{14}	—	September 17, 2009	Mount Lemmon	Mount Lemmon Survey	·	2.5 km	MPC · JPL
727115	2010 ER_{16}	—	January 28, 2007	Mount Lemmon	Mount Lemmon Survey	·	1.7 km	MPC · JPL
727116	2010 EZ_{17}	—	December 15, 2009	Catalina	CSS	·	3.8 km	MPC · JPL
727117	2010 EE_{18}	—	December 10, 2009	Mount Lemmon	Mount Lemmon Survey	THM	2.6 km	MPC · JPL
727118	2010 EM_{18}	—	November 19, 2009	Kitt Peak	Spacewatch	·	1.6 km	MPC · JPL
727119	2010 EX_{20}	—	March 10, 2010	Vitebsk	Nevski, V.	·	3.0 km	MPC · JPL
727120	2010 EV_{21}	—	March 9, 2010	Vail-Jarnac	Jarnac	EUP	3.4 km	MPC · JPL
727121	2010 EV_{22}	—	March 9, 2010	WISE	WISE	KON	1.8 km	MPC · JPL
727122	2010 EM_{23}	—	September 24, 2008	Kitt Peak	Spacewatch	3:2	4.4 km	MPC · JPL
727123	2010 EO_{23}	—	September 7, 2008	Mount Lemmon	Mount Lemmon Survey	·	3.3 km	MPC · JPL
727124	2010 EX_{23}	—	March 9, 2010	WISE	WISE	·	1.8 km	MPC · JPL
727125	2010 EZ_{23}	—	April 16, 2004	Apache Point	SDSS Collaboration	T_{j} (2.96)	3.6 km	MPC · JPL
727126	2010 EG_{24}	—	September 6, 2008	Mount Lemmon	Mount Lemmon Survey	·	4.6 km	MPC · JPL
727127	2010 EP_{24}	—	April 19, 2006	Mount Lemmon	Mount Lemmon Survey	(7605)	2.5 km	MPC · JPL
727128	2010 ET_{24}	—	January 13, 2005	Kitt Peak	Spacewatch	·	2.4 km	MPC · JPL
727129	2010 EV_{24}	—	December 16, 2009	Mount Lemmon	Mount Lemmon Survey	KON	2.1 km	MPC · JPL
727130	2010 EO_{25}	—	February 21, 2009	Kitt Peak	Spacewatch	·	2.6 km	MPC · JPL
727131	2010 EZ_{25}	—	January 4, 2010	Kitt Peak	Spacewatch	LIX	2.7 km	MPC · JPL
727132	2010 EE_{27}	—	December 10, 2009	Mount Lemmon	Mount Lemmon Survey	·	1.6 km	MPC · JPL
727133	2010 EC_{28}	—	November 19, 2003	Kitt Peak	Spacewatch	HYG	3.8 km	MPC · JPL
727134	2010 ER_{28}	—	October 18, 2003	Kitt Peak	Spacewatch	LIX	2.5 km	MPC · JPL
727135	2010 ET_{28}	—	November 23, 2009	Zelenchukskaya Stn	T. V. Krjačko, Satovski, B.	·	2.9 km	MPC · JPL
727136	2010 EU_{31}	—	February 17, 2010	Kitt Peak	Spacewatch	·	2.2 km	MPC · JPL
727137	2010 EA_{36}	—	March 11, 2010	La Sagra	OAM	·	1.6 km	MPC · JPL
727138	2010 ER_{42}	—	November 21, 2003	Kitt Peak	Spacewatch	THB	2.8 km	MPC · JPL
727139	2010 ET_{42}	—	March 5, 2010	Catalina	CSS	·	3.9 km	MPC · JPL
727140	2010 EX_{47}	—	March 11, 2010	WISE	WISE	·	3.3 km	MPC · JPL
727141	2010 EQ_{59}	—	February 2, 2005	Palomar	NEAT	·	4.1 km	MPC · JPL
727142	2010 EW_{59}	—	March 13, 2010	WISE	WISE	·	5.2 km	MPC · JPL
727143	2010 EJ_{60}	—	March 13, 2010	WISE	WISE	·	2.9 km	MPC · JPL
727144	2010 EK_{62}	—	July 27, 2005	Palomar	NEAT	T_{j} (2.95)	3.6 km	MPC · JPL
727145	2010 EC_{63}	—	November 3, 2004	Palomar	NEAT	DOR	1.9 km	MPC · JPL
727146	2010 EA_{64}	—	March 14, 2010	WISE	WISE	·	3.2 km	MPC · JPL
727147	2010 EG_{77}	—	March 12, 2010	Kitt Peak	Spacewatch	H	480 m	MPC · JPL
727148	2010 EU_{77}	—	March 12, 2010	Mount Lemmon	Mount Lemmon Survey	·	540 m	MPC · JPL
727149	2010 EU_{79}	—	November 20, 2001	Kitt Peak	Spacewatch	·	780 m	MPC · JPL
727150	2010 EO_{81}	—	March 12, 2010	Mount Lemmon	Mount Lemmon Survey	·	1.7 km	MPC · JPL
727151	2010 EG_{89}	—	September 30, 2007	Kitt Peak	Spacewatch	·	1.4 km	MPC · JPL
727152	2010 EL_{89}	—	October 22, 2008	Kitt Peak	Spacewatch	·	1.1 km	MPC · JPL
727153	2010 ER_{89}	—	January 26, 2006	Kitt Peak	Spacewatch	·	1.2 km	MPC · JPL
727154	2010 EY_{92}	—	February 16, 2010	Kitt Peak	Spacewatch	·	1.1 km	MPC · JPL
727155	2010 EG_{98}	—	March 14, 2010	Mount Lemmon	Mount Lemmon Survey	(2076)	890 m	MPC · JPL
727156	2010 EF_{106}	—	March 15, 2010	La Sagra	OAM	(895)	4.7 km	MPC · JPL
727157	2010 EZ_{110}	—	October 15, 2007	Kitt Peak	Spacewatch	·	2.9 km	MPC · JPL
727158	2010 EA_{111}	—	March 13, 2010	Catalina	CSS	·	5.0 km	MPC · JPL
727159	2010 EE_{113}	—	March 14, 2010	Kitt Peak	Spacewatch	·	2.6 km	MPC · JPL
727160	2010 EN_{115}	—	March 14, 2010	WISE	WISE	·	3.0 km	MPC · JPL
727161	2010 EF_{117}	—	March 15, 2010	WISE	WISE	·	3.8 km	MPC · JPL
727162	2010 ER_{117}	—	March 15, 2010	WISE	WISE	·	2.0 km	MPC · JPL
727163	2010 ET_{117}	—	March 15, 2010	WISE	WISE	·	2.7 km	MPC · JPL
727164	2010 EZ_{117}	—	August 27, 2005	Siding Spring	SSS	·	2.3 km	MPC · JPL
727165	2010 EF_{118}	—	September 6, 2008	Mount Lemmon	Mount Lemmon Survey	·	3.2 km	MPC · JPL
727166	2010 EO_{119}	—	March 15, 2010	WISE	WISE	·	3.1 km	MPC · JPL
727167	2010 ET_{121}	—	February 18, 2004	Kitt Peak	Spacewatch	·	2.9 km	MPC · JPL
727168	2010 EY_{122}	—	March 15, 2010	Mount Lemmon	Mount Lemmon Survey	·	2.0 km	MPC · JPL
727169	2010 EN_{124}	—	April 4, 2005	Catalina	CSS	·	3.2 km	MPC · JPL
727170	2010 EP_{124}	—	March 12, 2010	Vail-Jarnac	Jarnac	·	3.8 km	MPC · JPL
727171	2010 EG_{126}	—	March 14, 2010	La Sagra	OAM	·	3.7 km	MPC · JPL
727172	2010 EC_{131}	—	March 14, 2010	Kitt Peak	Spacewatch	VER	2.5 km	MPC · JPL
727173	2010 EV_{134}	—	March 12, 2010	Mount Lemmon	Mount Lemmon Survey	·	1.7 km	MPC · JPL
727174	2010 EX_{134}	—	March 12, 2010	Kitt Peak	Spacewatch	·	2.3 km	MPC · JPL
727175	2010 ED_{135}	—	March 12, 2010	Kitt Peak	Spacewatch	·	590 m	MPC · JPL
727176	2010 ER_{137}	—	March 12, 2010	Kitt Peak	Spacewatch	·	1.2 km	MPC · JPL
727177	2010 EF_{138}	—	March 13, 2010	Mount Lemmon	Mount Lemmon Survey	·	2.9 km	MPC · JPL
727178	2010 EA_{142}	—	March 13, 2010	Mount Lemmon	Mount Lemmon Survey	·	1.3 km	MPC · JPL
727179	2010 EF_{143}	—	March 14, 2010	Mount Lemmon	Mount Lemmon Survey	NYS	1.3 km	MPC · JPL
727180	2010 ES_{144}	—	January 18, 2009	Kitt Peak	Spacewatch	·	3.4 km	MPC · JPL
727181	2010 EM_{145}	—	December 30, 2005	Kitt Peak	Spacewatch	·	2.0 km	MPC · JPL
727182	2010 ED_{147}	—	December 11, 2009	Mount Lemmon	Mount Lemmon Survey	·	3.5 km	MPC · JPL
727183	2010 EQ_{150}	—	September 24, 2008	Catalina	CSS	·	5.0 km	MPC · JPL
727184	2010 EV_{150}	—	January 25, 2009	Kitt Peak	Spacewatch	·	2.0 km	MPC · JPL
727185	2010 EZ_{150}	—	January 8, 2010	Kitt Peak	Spacewatch	·	2.6 km	MPC · JPL
727186	2010 EM_{151}	—	October 5, 2013	Mount Lemmon	Mount Lemmon Survey	·	4.6 km	MPC · JPL
727187	2010 ET_{152}	—	March 11, 2010	WISE	WISE	·	1.3 km	MPC · JPL
727188	2010 ED_{153}	—	May 21, 2010	Mount Lemmon	Mount Lemmon Survey	·	3.6 km	MPC · JPL
727189	2010 EJ_{153}	—	September 7, 2008	Mount Lemmon	Mount Lemmon Survey	·	3.6 km	MPC · JPL
727190	2010 ET_{153}	—	December 6, 2007	Kitt Peak	Spacewatch	·	3.6 km	MPC · JPL
727191	2010 EZ_{153}	—	March 12, 2010	WISE	WISE	·	2.0 km	MPC · JPL
727192	2010 ER_{154}	—	March 12, 2010	WISE	WISE	·	5.3 km	MPC · JPL
727193	2010 EW_{155}	—	January 19, 2009	Mount Lemmon	Mount Lemmon Survey	·	2.5 km	MPC · JPL
727194	2010 ET_{156}	—	October 21, 2003	Kitt Peak	Spacewatch	TIR	1.8 km	MPC · JPL
727195	2010 EY_{157}	—	June 22, 2010	Mount Lemmon	Mount Lemmon Survey	T_{j} (2.99) · (895)	4.0 km	MPC · JPL
727196	2010 EB_{159}	—	December 20, 2009	Mount Lemmon	Mount Lemmon Survey	·	3.0 km	MPC · JPL
727197	2010 EG_{159}	—	March 14, 2010	WISE	WISE	(194)	1.8 km	MPC · JPL
727198	2010 EQ_{159}	—	March 14, 2010	WISE	WISE	ELF	4.3 km	MPC · JPL
727199	2010 EB_{160}	—	March 15, 2010	WISE	WISE	·	2.5 km	MPC · JPL
727200	2010 EP_{161}	—	March 2, 2010	WISE	WISE	·	3.6 km	MPC · JPL

== 727201–727300 ==
back to top

Designation			Discovery			Properties		Ref
Permanent	Provisional	Named after	Date	Site	Discoverer(s)	Category	Diam.	Ref
727201	2010 EB_{162}	—	December 17, 2009	Mount Lemmon	Mount Lemmon Survey	·	2.7 km	MPC · JPL
727202	2010 EN_{163}	—	March 3, 2010	WISE	WISE	KON	1.9 km	MPC · JPL
727203	2010 EU_{163}	—	March 3, 2010	WISE	WISE	·	3.0 km	MPC · JPL
727204	2010 EW_{163}	—	December 4, 2012	Mount Lemmon	Mount Lemmon Survey	·	2.8 km	MPC · JPL
727205	2010 EY_{163}	—	March 3, 2010	WISE	WISE	·	3.2 km	MPC · JPL
727206	2010 EL_{164}	—	November 25, 2009	Kitt Peak	Spacewatch	·	3.3 km	MPC · JPL
727207	2010 EM_{166}	—	January 1, 2009	Mount Lemmon	Mount Lemmon Survey	·	2.1 km	MPC · JPL
727208	2010 EO_{167}	—	March 6, 2010	WISE	WISE	·	2.2 km	MPC · JPL
727209	2010 EB_{169}	—	November 24, 2003	Kitt Peak	Spacewatch	·	3.0 km	MPC · JPL
727210	2010 EZ_{169}	—	March 8, 2010	WISE	WISE	·	3.4 km	MPC · JPL
727211	2010 EK_{186}	—	September 29, 2014	Haleakala	Pan-STARRS 1	·	2.6 km	MPC · JPL
727212	2010 EF_{188}	—	March 5, 2010	Catalina	CSS	·	1.1 km	MPC · JPL
727213	2010 EQ_{190}	—	August 1, 2017	Haleakala	Pan-STARRS 1	EOS	1.3 km	MPC · JPL
727214	2010 FO_{2}	—	October 19, 2003	Apache Point	SDSS	·	1.7 km	MPC · JPL
727215	2010 FA_{3}	—	February 18, 2010	Mount Lemmon	Mount Lemmon Survey	·	1.1 km	MPC · JPL
727216	2010 FH_{5}	—	February 6, 2006	Mount Lemmon	Mount Lemmon Survey	·	1.9 km	MPC · JPL
727217	2010 FB_{7}	—	March 17, 2004	Palomar	NEAT	LUT	5.2 km	MPC · JPL
727218	2010 FG_{8}	—	December 18, 2004	Mount Lemmon	Mount Lemmon Survey	·	2.2 km	MPC · JPL
727219	2010 FP_{8}	—	May 9, 2004	Palomar	NEAT	T_{j} (2.99) · EUP	3.8 km	MPC · JPL
727220	2010 FX_{8}	—	March 16, 2010	WISE	WISE	PHO	2.2 km	MPC · JPL
727221	2010 FM_{9}	—	February 1, 2006	Kitt Peak	Spacewatch	·	2.0 km	MPC · JPL
727222	2010 FU_{12}	—	January 11, 2010	Kitt Peak	Spacewatch	·	3.1 km	MPC · JPL
727223	2010 FO_{18}	—	June 19, 2006	Kitt Peak	Spacewatch	·	1.6 km	MPC · JPL
727224	2010 FD_{21}	—	March 18, 2010	Mount Lemmon	Mount Lemmon Survey	·	2.2 km	MPC · JPL
727225	2010 FR_{21}	—	March 18, 2010	Mount Lemmon	Mount Lemmon Survey	·	2.1 km	MPC · JPL
727226	2010 FV_{24}	—	March 18, 2010	Mount Lemmon	Mount Lemmon Survey	·	760 m	MPC · JPL
727227	2010 FB_{27}	—	March 20, 2010	Kitt Peak	Spacewatch	·	3.1 km	MPC · JPL
727228	2010 FV_{29}	—	March 17, 2010	Kitt Peak	Spacewatch	·	4.4 km	MPC · JPL
727229	2010 FD_{32}	—	March 15, 2004	Kitt Peak	Spacewatch	·	4.3 km	MPC · JPL
727230	2010 FZ_{32}	—	March 17, 2010	WISE	WISE	·	2.2 km	MPC · JPL
727231	2010 FN_{35}	—	March 18, 2010	WISE	WISE	·	2.9 km	MPC · JPL
727232	2010 FS_{35}	—	March 18, 2010	WISE	WISE	·	2.1 km	MPC · JPL
727233	2010 FC_{36}	—	August 4, 2005	CAO, San Pedro de	CAO, San Pedro de	T_{j} (2.97)	4.7 km	MPC · JPL
727234	2010 FJ_{36}	—	March 18, 2010	WISE	WISE	·	2.1 km	MPC · JPL
727235	2010 FN_{36}	—	March 18, 2010	WISE	WISE	·	3.4 km	MPC · JPL
727236	2010 FA_{41}	—	September 28, 2008	Mount Lemmon	Mount Lemmon Survey	·	4.9 km	MPC · JPL
727237	2010 FT_{41}	—	May 19, 2004	Kitt Peak	Spacewatch	·	4.6 km	MPC · JPL
727238	2010 FM_{42}	—	February 20, 2009	Kitt Peak	Spacewatch	·	2.6 km	MPC · JPL
727239	2010 FF_{43}	—	March 20, 2010	WISE	WISE	·	3.3 km	MPC · JPL
727240	2010 FZ_{45}	—	October 6, 2008	Mount Lemmon	Mount Lemmon Survey	·	2.5 km	MPC · JPL
727241	2010 FN_{46}	—	March 22, 2010	WISE	WISE	·	4.1 km	MPC · JPL
727242	2010 FK_{47}	—	March 22, 2010	ESA OGS	ESA OGS	·	560 m	MPC · JPL
727243	2010 FK_{49}	—	March 23, 2010	WISE	WISE	PHO	2.8 km	MPC · JPL
727244	2010 FZ_{51}	—	March 27, 2010	WISE	WISE	·	2.5 km	MPC · JPL
727245	2010 FX_{55}	—	March 17, 2010	Kitt Peak	Spacewatch	LIX	3.7 km	MPC · JPL
727246	2010 FU_{57}	—	December 11, 2009	Mount Lemmon	Mount Lemmon Survey	T_{j} (2.96)	5.0 km	MPC · JPL
727247	2010 FY_{57}	—	January 30, 2009	Mount Lemmon	Mount Lemmon Survey	·	4.4 km	MPC · JPL
727248	2010 FU_{58}	—	March 25, 2010	WISE	WISE	·	3.3 km	MPC · JPL
727249	2010 FB_{61}	—	March 26, 2010	WISE	WISE	·	6.1 km	MPC · JPL
727250	2010 FR_{61}	—	August 24, 2008	Kitt Peak	Spacewatch	·	2.4 km	MPC · JPL
727251	2010 FN_{62}	—	September 30, 2006	Mount Lemmon	Mount Lemmon Survey	(69559)	3.7 km	MPC · JPL
727252	2010 FH_{63}	—	September 10, 2013	Haleakala	Pan-STARRS 1	·	1.9 km	MPC · JPL
727253	2010 FJ_{63}	—	September 28, 2008	Mount Lemmon	Mount Lemmon Survey	·	3.4 km	MPC · JPL
727254	2010 FJ_{64}	—	November 17, 2008	Catalina	CSS	·	4.9 km	MPC · JPL
727255	2010 FD_{65}	—	March 28, 2010	WISE	WISE	·	2.7 km	MPC · JPL
727256	2010 FN_{65}	—	March 28, 2010	WISE	WISE	·	3.2 km	MPC · JPL
727257	2010 FD_{67}	—	March 29, 2010	WISE	WISE	·	2.9 km	MPC · JPL
727258	2010 FO_{67}	—	March 29, 2010	WISE	WISE	·	2.5 km	MPC · JPL
727259	2010 FQ_{67}	—	March 29, 2010	WISE	WISE	·	2.0 km	MPC · JPL
727260	2010 FO_{69}	—	August 25, 2003	Palomar	NEAT	·	3.6 km	MPC · JPL
727261	2010 FP_{71}	—	December 18, 2009	Mount Lemmon	Mount Lemmon Survey	·	2.3 km	MPC · JPL
727262	2010 FT_{71}	—	February 20, 2001	Haleakala	NEAT	·	2.8 km	MPC · JPL
727263	2010 FL_{73}	—	March 29, 2010	WISE	WISE	·	3.0 km	MPC · JPL
727264	2010 FY_{73}	—	March 30, 2010	WISE	WISE	·	2.3 km	MPC · JPL
727265	2010 FK_{75}	—	March 31, 2010	WISE	WISE	·	2.7 km	MPC · JPL
727266	2010 FF_{77}	—	October 15, 2009	Mount Lemmon	Mount Lemmon Survey	·	1.9 km	MPC · JPL
727267	2010 FM_{78}	—	September 21, 2011	Haleakala	Pan-STARRS 1	·	4.4 km	MPC · JPL
727268	2010 FS_{78}	—	January 8, 2010	Mount Lemmon	Mount Lemmon Survey	·	2.0 km	MPC · JPL
727269	2010 FR_{79}	—	October 25, 2008	Mount Lemmon	Mount Lemmon Survey	·	3.0 km	MPC · JPL
727270	2010 FX_{87}	—	March 19, 2010	Mount Lemmon	Mount Lemmon Survey	HYG	2.1 km	MPC · JPL
727271	2010 FG_{92}	—	March 20, 2010	Catalina	CSS	·	2.1 km	MPC · JPL
727272	2010 FC_{95}	—	January 30, 2003	Kitt Peak	Spacewatch	·	540 m	MPC · JPL
727273	2010 FE_{96}	—	March 16, 2010	Mount Lemmon	Mount Lemmon Survey	·	1.4 km	MPC · JPL
727274	2010 FS_{96}	—	February 24, 2006	Kitt Peak	Spacewatch	·	820 m	MPC · JPL
727275	2010 FJ_{97}	—	October 5, 2002	Palomar	NEAT	·	1.8 km	MPC · JPL
727276	2010 FH_{98}	—	April 17, 2005	Kitt Peak	Spacewatch	·	2.6 km	MPC · JPL
727277	2010 FM_{98}	—	March 19, 2010	Kitt Peak	Spacewatch	HNS	890 m	MPC · JPL
727278	2010 FL_{103}	—	September 25, 2019	Haleakala	Pan-STARRS 1	·	2.8 km	MPC · JPL
727279	2010 FB_{105}	—	March 18, 2010	WISE	WISE	·	3.1 km	MPC · JPL
727280	2010 FL_{105}	—	September 6, 2008	Mount Lemmon	Mount Lemmon Survey	·	2.0 km	MPC · JPL
727281	2010 FO_{105}	—	September 17, 2003	Kitt Peak	Spacewatch	·	2.2 km	MPC · JPL
727282	2010 FC_{106}	—	December 18, 2009	Kitt Peak	Spacewatch	·	3.3 km	MPC · JPL
727283	2010 FV_{106}	—	September 19, 2006	Kitt Peak	Spacewatch	EUP	4.7 km	MPC · JPL
727284	2010 FZ_{106}	—	March 19, 2010	WISE	WISE	·	3.4 km	MPC · JPL
727285	2010 FK_{107}	—	March 20, 2010	WISE	WISE	·	1.6 km	MPC · JPL
727286	2010 FJ_{108}	—	September 5, 2008	Kitt Peak	Spacewatch	·	3.5 km	MPC · JPL
727287	2010 FY_{108}	—	December 18, 2009	Kitt Peak	Spacewatch	·	3.3 km	MPC · JPL
727288	2010 FB_{109}	—	April 7, 2006	Kitt Peak	Spacewatch	·	3.0 km	MPC · JPL
727289	2010 FM_{109}	—	December 16, 2009	Mount Lemmon	Mount Lemmon Survey	·	2.4 km	MPC · JPL
727290	2010 FZ_{109}	—	March 21, 2010	WISE	WISE	·	2.8 km	MPC · JPL
727291	2010 FD_{110}	—	March 21, 2010	WISE	WISE	·	1.5 km	MPC · JPL
727292	2010 FA_{111}	—	October 22, 2003	Kitt Peak	Spacewatch	EOS	1.8 km	MPC · JPL
727293	2010 FN_{111}	—	March 23, 2010	WISE	WISE	·	3.8 km	MPC · JPL
727294	2010 FF_{112}	—	March 24, 2010	WISE	WISE	·	2.3 km	MPC · JPL
727295	2010 FK_{112}	—	December 27, 2000	Anderson Mesa	LONEOS	·	1.8 km	MPC · JPL
727296	2010 FD_{113}	—	March 26, 2010	WISE	WISE	·	1.3 km	MPC · JPL
727297	2010 FC_{115}	—	April 26, 2001	Kitt Peak	Spacewatch	·	2.7 km	MPC · JPL
727298	2010 FJ_{115}	—	March 27, 2010	WISE	WISE	·	2.4 km	MPC · JPL
727299	2010 FL_{115}	—	March 27, 2010	WISE	WISE	LIX	2.6 km	MPC · JPL
727300	2010 FE_{118}	—	March 29, 2010	WISE	WISE	·	3.7 km	MPC · JPL

== 727301–727400 ==
back to top

Designation			Discovery			Properties		Ref
Permanent	Provisional	Named after	Date	Site	Discoverer(s)	Category	Diam.	Ref
727301	2010 FG_{118}	—	March 29, 2010	WISE	WISE	·	3.3 km	MPC · JPL
727302	2010 FX_{118}	—	March 29, 2010	WISE	WISE	·	2.4 km	MPC · JPL
727303	2010 FK_{119}	—	March 15, 2004	Kitt Peak	Spacewatch	·	2.3 km	MPC · JPL
727304	2010 FE_{120}	—	September 23, 2008	Kitt Peak	Spacewatch	HOF	3.1 km	MPC · JPL
727305	2010 FP_{122}	—	November 21, 2008	Mount Lemmon	Mount Lemmon Survey	·	1.3 km	MPC · JPL
727306	2010 FD_{123}	—	March 18, 2010	Mount Lemmon	Mount Lemmon Survey	·	1.1 km	MPC · JPL
727307	2010 FW_{135}	—	September 29, 2008	Mount Lemmon	Mount Lemmon Survey	·	1.6 km	MPC · JPL
727308	2010 FU_{138}	—	March 18, 2010	Kitt Peak	Spacewatch	3:2	4.8 km	MPC · JPL
727309	2010 FU_{140}	—	September 13, 2017	Kitt Peak	Spacewatch	·	1.5 km	MPC · JPL
727310	2010 FE_{141}	—	March 25, 2010	Mount Lemmon	Mount Lemmon Survey	·	490 m	MPC · JPL
727311	2010 FQ_{141}	—	March 8, 2014	Mount Lemmon	Mount Lemmon Survey	MAR	860 m	MPC · JPL
727312	2010 FY_{141}	—	October 18, 2012	Haleakala	Pan-STARRS 1	·	1.1 km	MPC · JPL
727313	2010 FQ_{144}	—	March 18, 2010	Kitt Peak	Spacewatch	·	860 m	MPC · JPL
727314	2010 FL_{145}	—	March 16, 2010	Mount Lemmon	Mount Lemmon Survey	THM	2.2 km	MPC · JPL
727315	2010 GP	—	April 1, 2010	WISE	WISE	PHO	2.2 km	MPC · JPL
727316	2010 GT	—	April 1, 2010	WISE	WISE	·	1.9 km	MPC · JPL
727317	2010 GD_{1}	—	February 1, 2017	Mount Lemmon	Mount Lemmon Survey	L5	8.0 km	MPC · JPL
727318	2010 GU_{1}	—	November 21, 2009	Mount Lemmon	Mount Lemmon Survey	·	1.8 km	MPC · JPL
727319	2010 GW_{2}	—	November 15, 2007	Mount Lemmon	Mount Lemmon Survey	·	2.5 km	MPC · JPL
727320	2010 GS_{3}	—	April 1, 2010	WISE	WISE	KON	1.7 km	MPC · JPL
727321	2010 GG_{4}	—	January 9, 2002	Apache Point	SDSS Collaboration	·	2.2 km	MPC · JPL
727322	2010 GQ_{8}	—	April 1, 2010	WISE	WISE	·	3.1 km	MPC · JPL
727323	2010 GL_{9}	—	April 2, 2010	WISE	WISE	L5	10 km	MPC · JPL
727324	2010 GW_{9}	—	October 19, 2003	Palomar	NEAT	·	3.3 km	MPC · JPL
727325	2010 GQ_{11}	—	April 2, 2010	WISE	WISE	T_{j} (2.99) · (895)	3.7 km	MPC · JPL
727326	2010 GC_{12}	—	January 15, 2010	Catalina	CSS	·	1.2 km	MPC · JPL
727327	2010 GC_{14}	—	March 4, 2005	Catalina	CSS	·	4.1 km	MPC · JPL
727328	2010 GV_{18}	—	January 5, 2006	Mount Lemmon	Mount Lemmon Survey	KON	1.5 km	MPC · JPL
727329	2010 GD_{19}	—	April 4, 2010	WISE	WISE	EOS	2.8 km	MPC · JPL
727330	2010 GG_{19}	—	October 18, 2003	Kitt Peak	Spacewatch	·	2.4 km	MPC · JPL
727331	2010 GL_{20}	—	January 12, 2010	Mount Lemmon	Mount Lemmon Survey	EOS	3.0 km	MPC · JPL
727332	2010 GH_{23}	—	April 4, 2010	WISE	WISE	T_{j} (2.92) · 3:2	5.4 km	MPC · JPL
727333	2010 GD_{24}	—	July 22, 2002	Palomar	NEAT	·	5.3 km	MPC · JPL
727334	2010 GK_{24}	—	January 31, 2006	Mount Lemmon	Mount Lemmon Survey	MAR	930 m	MPC · JPL
727335	2010 GP_{24}	—	October 4, 2002	Palomar	NEAT	·	2.9 km	MPC · JPL
727336	2010 GF_{29}	—	April 8, 2010	Mount Lemmon	Mount Lemmon Survey	3:2	4.0 km	MPC · JPL
727337	2010 GN_{34}	—	September 12, 2007	Mount Lemmon	Mount Lemmon Survey	·	2.5 km	MPC · JPL
727338	2010 GR_{37}	—	April 5, 2010	WISE	WISE	·	2.3 km	MPC · JPL
727339	2010 GU_{38}	—	April 6, 2010	WISE	WISE	KON	1.7 km	MPC · JPL
727340	2010 GK_{39}	—	April 6, 2010	WISE	WISE	·	3.1 km	MPC · JPL
727341	2010 GO_{39}	—	November 21, 2009	Mount Lemmon	Mount Lemmon Survey	·	1.5 km	MPC · JPL
727342	2010 GX_{40}	—	September 22, 2012	Mount Lemmon	Mount Lemmon Survey	L5	8.5 km	MPC · JPL
727343	2010 GX_{42}	—	April 7, 2010	WISE	WISE	L5	9.9 km	MPC · JPL
727344	2010 GB_{43}	—	January 12, 2010	Mount Lemmon	Mount Lemmon Survey	·	2.4 km	MPC · JPL
727345	2010 GA_{44}	—	January 12, 2010	Mount Lemmon	Mount Lemmon Survey	·	2.6 km	MPC · JPL
727346	2010 GV_{44}	—	December 26, 2009	Kitt Peak	Spacewatch	·	3.2 km	MPC · JPL
727347	2010 GU_{45}	—	January 12, 2010	Mount Lemmon	Mount Lemmon Survey	·	2.7 km	MPC · JPL
727348	2010 GB_{46}	—	January 7, 1999	Kitt Peak	Spacewatch	·	5.4 km	MPC · JPL
727349	2010 GH_{47}	—	April 8, 2010	WISE	WISE	·	2.4 km	MPC · JPL
727350	2010 GA_{48}	—	April 8, 2010	WISE	WISE	·	2.2 km	MPC · JPL
727351	2010 GM_{48}	—	October 7, 2005	Mount Lemmon	Mount Lemmon Survey	·	2.5 km	MPC · JPL
727352	2010 GB_{49}	—	November 21, 2009	Mount Lemmon	Mount Lemmon Survey	·	3.3 km	MPC · JPL
727353	2010 GB_{50}	—	April 8, 2010	WISE	WISE	·	2.5 km	MPC · JPL
727354	2010 GE_{50}	—	April 8, 2010	WISE	WISE	·	1.7 km	MPC · JPL
727355	2010 GY_{50}	—	May 21, 2006	Mount Lemmon	Mount Lemmon Survey	·	3.1 km	MPC · JPL
727356	2010 GO_{51}	—	December 20, 2009	Kitt Peak	Spacewatch	·	2.5 km	MPC · JPL
727357	2010 GZ_{51}	—	February 9, 2005	Mount Lemmon	Mount Lemmon Survey	·	2.5 km	MPC · JPL
727358	2010 GD_{53}	—	August 4, 2002	Palomar	NEAT	·	2.2 km	MPC · JPL
727359	2010 GA_{54}	—	January 9, 2010	Mount Lemmon	Mount Lemmon Survey	·	3.6 km	MPC · JPL
727360	2010 GM_{54}	—	March 31, 2009	Mount Lemmon	Mount Lemmon Survey	·	3.7 km	MPC · JPL
727361	2010 GR_{55}	—	January 12, 2010	Mount Lemmon	Mount Lemmon Survey	ELF	3.0 km	MPC · JPL
727362	2010 GV_{57}	—	April 10, 2010	WISE	WISE	·	3.6 km	MPC · JPL
727363	2010 GW_{57}	—	April 10, 2010	WISE	WISE	·	1.7 km	MPC · JPL
727364	2010 GB_{59}	—	November 24, 2000	Kitt Peak	Spacewatch	·	3.6 km	MPC · JPL
727365	2010 GE_{61}	—	April 6, 2010	WISE	WISE	·	1.9 km	MPC · JPL
727366	2010 GK_{61}	—	January 12, 2010	Mount Lemmon	Mount Lemmon Survey	·	620 m	MPC · JPL
727367	2010 GT_{61}	—	April 8, 2010	WISE	WISE	·	1.9 km	MPC · JPL
727368	2010 GV_{61}	—	April 8, 2010	WISE	WISE	·	2.4 km	MPC · JPL
727369	2010 GG_{62}	—	January 13, 2010	Mount Lemmon	Mount Lemmon Survey	·	2.9 km	MPC · JPL
727370	2010 GM_{62}	—	September 21, 2003	Kitt Peak	Spacewatch	·	2.0 km	MPC · JPL
727371	2010 GA_{63}	—	April 6, 2010	WISE	WISE	·	2.0 km	MPC · JPL
727372	2010 GB_{64}	—	April 8, 2010	WISE	WISE	·	3.0 km	MPC · JPL
727373	2010 GJ_{64}	—	November 20, 2003	Apache Point	SDSS Collaboration	·	2.0 km	MPC · JPL
727374	2010 GX_{64}	—	December 26, 2009	Kitt Peak	Spacewatch	KON	1.8 km	MPC · JPL
727375	2010 GZ_{65}	—	March 14, 2010	La Sagra	OAM	PHO	2.0 km	MPC · JPL
727376	2010 GM_{69}	—	February 7, 2010	Dauban	C. Rinner, Kugel, F.	·	3.4 km	MPC · JPL
727377	2010 GN_{69}	—	October 28, 2008	Kitt Peak	Spacewatch	·	2.7 km	MPC · JPL
727378	2010 GJ_{73}	—	November 8, 2008	Mount Lemmon	Mount Lemmon Survey	·	3.4 km	MPC · JPL
727379	2010 GR_{74}	—	April 14, 2010	WISE	WISE	·	2.5 km	MPC · JPL
727380	2010 GZ_{74}	—	April 13, 2010	WISE	WISE	·	2.9 km	MPC · JPL
727381	2010 GN_{75}	—	March 12, 2010	Catalina	CSS	·	530 m	MPC · JPL
727382	2010 GK_{77}	—	November 27, 2009	Mount Lemmon	Mount Lemmon Survey	·	1.8 km	MPC · JPL
727383	2010 GB_{79}	—	November 26, 2003	Kitt Peak	Spacewatch	·	2.8 km	MPC · JPL
727384	2010 GP_{80}	—	April 11, 2010	WISE	WISE	·	2.5 km	MPC · JPL
727385	2010 GU_{80}	—	April 11, 2010	WISE	WISE	KON	2.3 km	MPC · JPL
727386	2010 GG_{83}	—	October 8, 2008	Kitt Peak	Spacewatch	HOF	2.0 km	MPC · JPL
727387	2010 GH_{83}	—	December 18, 2001	Palomar	NEAT	T_{j} (2.98) · 3:2	4.2 km	MPC · JPL
727388	2010 GU_{83}	—	September 26, 2008	Kitt Peak	Spacewatch	VER	2.5 km	MPC · JPL
727389	2010 GY_{83}	—	April 12, 2010	WISE	WISE	·	1.5 km	MPC · JPL
727390	2010 GG_{85}	—	April 12, 2010	WISE	WISE	·	2.7 km	MPC · JPL
727391	2010 GF_{86}	—	October 26, 2008	Kitt Peak	Spacewatch	EMA	3.0 km	MPC · JPL
727392	2010 GM_{86}	—	March 17, 2009	Kitt Peak	Spacewatch	·	4.3 km	MPC · JPL
727393	2010 GB_{87}	—	December 20, 2009	Kitt Peak	Spacewatch	·	1.2 km	MPC · JPL
727394	2010 GQ_{87}	—	April 12, 2010	WISE	WISE	·	2.5 km	MPC · JPL
727395	2010 GA_{88}	—	March 20, 2004	Kitt Peak	Spacewatch	·	2.0 km	MPC · JPL
727396	2010 GM_{88}	—	April 13, 2010	WISE	WISE	EOS	2.1 km	MPC · JPL
727397	2010 GB_{89}	—	April 13, 2010	WISE	WISE	·	2.7 km	MPC · JPL
727398	2010 GP_{89}	—	May 2, 2009	Mount Lemmon	Mount Lemmon Survey	L5	8.6 km	MPC · JPL
727399	2010 GV_{89}	—	April 13, 2010	WISE	WISE	·	4.3 km	MPC · JPL
727400	2010 GX_{91}	—	April 13, 2010	WISE	WISE	·	1.9 km	MPC · JPL

== 727401–727500 ==
back to top

Designation			Discovery			Properties		Ref
Permanent	Provisional	Named after	Date	Site	Discoverer(s)	Category	Diam.	Ref
727401	2010 GY_{92}	—	April 14, 2010	WISE	WISE	·	2.5 km	MPC · JPL
727402	2010 GB_{94}	—	August 22, 2004	Kitt Peak	Spacewatch	·	2.2 km	MPC · JPL
727403	2010 GJ_{94}	—	April 14, 2010	WISE	WISE	·	1.9 km	MPC · JPL
727404	2010 GC_{95}	—	April 14, 2010	WISE	WISE	·	2.5 km	MPC · JPL
727405	2010 GR_{95}	—	January 23, 2010	Siding Spring	SSS	(194)	3.2 km	MPC · JPL
727406	2010 GU_{99}	—	April 4, 2010	Kitt Peak	Spacewatch	EUP	2.9 km	MPC · JPL
727407	2010 GS_{101}	—	April 5, 2010	Mount Lemmon	Mount Lemmon Survey	·	2.2 km	MPC · JPL
727408	2010 GH_{108}	—	April 8, 2010	Kitt Peak	Spacewatch	·	3.1 km	MPC · JPL
727409	2010 GG_{112}	—	April 10, 2010	Kitt Peak	Spacewatch	·	3.4 km	MPC · JPL
727410	2010 GG_{114}	—	April 10, 2010	Kitt Peak	Spacewatch	·	520 m	MPC · JPL
727411	2010 GJ_{117}	—	April 10, 2010	Kitt Peak	Spacewatch	·	2.9 km	MPC · JPL
727412	2010 GL_{119}	—	April 11, 2010	Kitt Peak	Spacewatch	·	2.6 km	MPC · JPL
727413	2010 GG_{121}	—	April 10, 2010	Mount Lemmon	Mount Lemmon Survey	(5)	1.1 km	MPC · JPL
727414	2010 GS_{125}	—	April 9, 2010	Kitt Peak	Spacewatch	·	2.8 km	MPC · JPL
727415	2010 GA_{131}	—	March 23, 2006	Kitt Peak	Spacewatch	·	850 m	MPC · JPL
727416	2010 GR_{134}	—	October 18, 2007	Mount Lemmon	Mount Lemmon Survey	·	2.4 km	MPC · JPL
727417	2010 GT_{135}	—	October 31, 2007	Kitt Peak	Spacewatch	·	3.0 km	MPC · JPL
727418	2010 GV_{135}	—	April 4, 2010	Kitt Peak	Spacewatch	·	1.5 km	MPC · JPL
727419	2010 GG_{137}	—	September 12, 2007	Mount Lemmon	Mount Lemmon Survey	NYS	1 km	MPC · JPL
727420	2010 GO_{138}	—	April 6, 2010	Mount Lemmon	Mount Lemmon Survey	·	2.3 km	MPC · JPL
727421	2010 GX_{145}	—	November 20, 2003	Kitt Peak	Deep Ecliptic Survey	·	1.3 km	MPC · JPL
727422	2010 GB_{147}	—	October 22, 2003	Apache Point	SDSS Collaboration	·	3.2 km	MPC · JPL
727423	2010 GP_{147}	—	November 26, 2014	Haleakala	Pan-STARRS 1	L5	10 km	MPC · JPL
727424	2010 GJ_{148}	—	April 14, 2010	WISE	WISE	L5	8.5 km	MPC · JPL
727425	2010 GY_{152}	—	April 15, 2010	WISE	WISE	·	2.6 km	MPC · JPL
727426	2010 GM_{159}	—	April 9, 2010	Catalina	CSS	·	1.4 km	MPC · JPL
727427	2010 GF_{163}	—	March 7, 2009	Mount Lemmon	Mount Lemmon Survey	LIX	3.1 km	MPC · JPL
727428	2010 GS_{164}	—	April 14, 2010	WISE	WISE	·	2.3 km	MPC · JPL
727429	2010 GF_{166}	—	April 2, 2010	WISE	WISE	·	2.8 km	MPC · JPL
727430	2010 GV_{166}	—	January 19, 2015	Haleakala	Pan-STARRS 1	·	3.6 km	MPC · JPL
727431	2010 GB_{167}	—	January 6, 2010	Mount Lemmon	Mount Lemmon Survey	·	4.3 km	MPC · JPL
727432	2010 GQ_{167}	—	April 5, 2010	WISE	WISE	·	2.8 km	MPC · JPL
727433	2010 GS_{167}	—	April 5, 2010	WISE	WISE	·	2.2 km	MPC · JPL
727434	2010 GU_{167}	—	November 4, 2004	Catalina	CSS	·	1.7 km	MPC · JPL
727435	2010 GE_{168}	—	October 25, 2003	Kitt Peak	Spacewatch	·	3.2 km	MPC · JPL
727436	2010 GU_{168}	—	September 26, 2013	Mount Lemmon	Mount Lemmon Survey	L5	8.7 km	MPC · JPL
727437	2010 GA_{169}	—	October 8, 2008	Mount Lemmon	Mount Lemmon Survey	·	2.6 km	MPC · JPL
727438	2010 GW_{169}	—	April 8, 2010	WISE	WISE	·	1.4 km	MPC · JPL
727439	2010 GU_{170}	—	April 9, 2010	WISE	WISE	·	1.1 km	MPC · JPL
727440	2010 GC_{171}	—	October 21, 2008	Mount Lemmon	Mount Lemmon Survey	·	1.6 km	MPC · JPL
727441	2010 GV_{171}	—	October 22, 2012	Catalina	CSS	·	1.6 km	MPC · JPL
727442	2010 GD_{173}	—	December 13, 2004	Kitt Peak	Spacewatch	·	2.0 km	MPC · JPL
727443	2010 GP_{176}	—	October 20, 2007	Mount Lemmon	Mount Lemmon Survey	·	1.7 km	MPC · JPL
727444	2010 GS_{176}	—	April 10, 2010	Mount Lemmon	Mount Lemmon Survey	·	2.5 km	MPC · JPL
727445	2010 GT_{179}	—	October 27, 2009	Mount Lemmon	Mount Lemmon Survey	3:2	4.6 km	MPC · JPL
727446	2010 GD_{199}	—	April 10, 2010	Kitt Peak	Spacewatch	·	1.7 km	MPC · JPL
727447	2010 GS_{200}	—	October 14, 2014	Mount Lemmon	Mount Lemmon Survey	·	850 m	MPC · JPL
727448	2010 GP_{202}	—	October 13, 2013	Mount Lemmon	Mount Lemmon Survey	·	2.8 km	MPC · JPL
727449	2010 GF_{203}	—	August 28, 2016	Mount Lemmon	Mount Lemmon Survey	·	1.5 km	MPC · JPL
727450	2010 GU_{203}	—	January 9, 2016	Haleakala	Pan-STARRS 1	THB	3.1 km	MPC · JPL
727451	2010 GK_{205}	—	October 28, 2016	Haleakala	Pan-STARRS 1	·	940 m	MPC · JPL
727452	2010 GK_{206}	—	April 15, 2010	Charleston	R. Holmes	MAR	690 m	MPC · JPL
727453	2010 GL_{212}	—	June 16, 2010	WISE	WISE	·	1.6 km	MPC · JPL
727454	2010 HR_{2}	—	April 16, 2010	WISE	WISE	·	2.6 km	MPC · JPL
727455	2010 HL_{3}	—	October 10, 2008	Mount Lemmon	Mount Lemmon Survey	·	1.4 km	MPC · JPL
727456	2010 HM_{3}	—	September 25, 2008	Kitt Peak	Spacewatch	·	2.5 km	MPC · JPL
727457	2010 HF_{4}	—	April 16, 2010	WISE	WISE	·	4.4 km	MPC · JPL
727458	2010 HR_{5}	—	April 16, 2010	WISE	WISE	·	2.3 km	MPC · JPL
727459	2010 HJ_{7}	—	April 16, 2010	WISE	WISE	EOS	3.0 km	MPC · JPL
727460	2010 HT_{8}	—	April 17, 2010	WISE	WISE	·	2.3 km	MPC · JPL
727461	2010 HY_{9}	—	April 17, 2010	WISE	WISE	T_{j} (2.97)	3.6 km	MPC · JPL
727462	2010 HA_{10}	—	September 23, 2008	Kitt Peak	Spacewatch	·	2.9 km	MPC · JPL
727463	2010 HB_{10}	—	April 17, 2010	WISE	WISE	·	4.0 km	MPC · JPL
727464	2010 HE_{10}	—	April 17, 2010	WISE	WISE	·	2.1 km	MPC · JPL
727465	2010 HK_{10}	—	April 17, 2010	WISE	WISE	·	3.3 km	MPC · JPL
727466	2010 HV_{10}	—	April 17, 2010	WISE	WISE	·	3.8 km	MPC · JPL
727467	2010 HS_{12}	—	April 17, 2010	WISE	WISE	·	3.0 km	MPC · JPL
727468	2010 HL_{13}	—	April 18, 2010	WISE	WISE	·	3.2 km	MPC · JPL
727469	2010 HN_{15}	—	January 11, 2010	Mount Lemmon	Mount Lemmon Survey	ADE	2.0 km	MPC · JPL
727470	2010 HC_{18}	—	April 18, 2010	WISE	WISE	·	1.3 km	MPC · JPL
727471	2010 HG_{19}	—	April 18, 2010	WISE	WISE	·	2.8 km	MPC · JPL
727472	2010 HH_{19}	—	April 18, 2010	WISE	WISE	·	3.8 km	MPC · JPL
727473	2010 HR_{19}	—	January 24, 2003	Palomar	NEAT	PHO	1.9 km	MPC · JPL
727474	2010 HB_{23}	—	April 26, 2010	WISE	WISE	·	3.5 km	MPC · JPL
727475	2010 HC_{24}	—	April 26, 2010	WISE	WISE	L5	10 km	MPC · JPL
727476	2010 HG_{25}	—	April 18, 2010	WISE	WISE	·	3.8 km	MPC · JPL
727477	2010 HK_{27}	—	April 19, 2010	WISE	WISE	·	2.7 km	MPC · JPL
727478	2010 HN_{27}	—	January 8, 2010	Kitt Peak	Spacewatch	·	3.1 km	MPC · JPL
727479	2010 HU_{28}	—	February 9, 2010	Mount Lemmon	Mount Lemmon Survey	EOS	2.0 km	MPC · JPL
727480	2010 HQ_{30}	—	July 14, 2004	Siding Spring	SSS	·	3.7 km	MPC · JPL
727481	2010 HT_{31}	—	April 19, 2010	WISE	WISE	·	3.4 km	MPC · JPL
727482	2010 HV_{31}	—	December 19, 2003	Kitt Peak	Spacewatch	·	3.0 km	MPC · JPL
727483	2010 HW_{31}	—	April 19, 2010	WISE	WISE	EUP	3.1 km	MPC · JPL
727484	2010 HF_{33}	—	September 30, 2005	Palomar	NEAT	EUP	2.9 km	MPC · JPL
727485	2010 HS_{33}	—	April 20, 2010	WISE	WISE	·	2.2 km	MPC · JPL
727486	2010 HE_{34}	—	April 20, 2010	WISE	WISE	·	4.1 km	MPC · JPL
727487	2010 HK_{35}	—	October 24, 2008	Mount Lemmon	Mount Lemmon Survey	·	2.7 km	MPC · JPL
727488	2010 HU_{35}	—	April 20, 2010	WISE	WISE	·	2.5 km	MPC · JPL
727489	2010 HU_{36}	—	March 8, 2003	Kitt Peak	Spacewatch	·	4.8 km	MPC · JPL
727490	2010 HK_{38}	—	December 23, 2012	Haleakala	Pan-STARRS 1	·	2.6 km	MPC · JPL
727491	2010 HQ_{38}	—	April 18, 2009	Mount Lemmon	Mount Lemmon Survey	·	3.5 km	MPC · JPL
727492	2010 HN_{39}	—	December 18, 2001	Kitt Peak	Deep Lens Survey	·	3.0 km	MPC · JPL
727493	2010 HK_{40}	—	April 22, 2010	WISE	WISE	·	1.7 km	MPC · JPL
727494	2010 HQ_{40}	—	October 23, 2006	Kitt Peak	Spacewatch	·	4.5 km	MPC · JPL
727495	2010 HO_{42}	—	April 22, 2010	WISE	WISE	·	3.8 km	MPC · JPL
727496	2010 HH_{43}	—	February 1, 2009	Catalina	CSS	PHO	2.2 km	MPC · JPL
727497	2010 HL_{43}	—	April 23, 2010	WISE	WISE	·	2.0 km	MPC · JPL
727498	2010 HP_{43}	—	July 28, 2005	Siding Spring	SSS	·	4.9 km	MPC · JPL
727499	2010 HS_{43}	—	March 11, 2003	Kitt Peak	Spacewatch	·	3.1 km	MPC · JPL
727500	2010 HH_{44}	—	April 23, 2010	WISE	WISE	·	3.1 km	MPC · JPL

== 727501–727600 ==
back to top

Designation			Discovery			Properties		Ref
Permanent	Provisional	Named after	Date	Site	Discoverer(s)	Category	Diam.	Ref
727501	2010 HW_{44}	—	May 23, 2004	Apache Point	SDSS Collaboration	·	3.5 km	MPC · JPL
727502	2010 HA_{45}	—	April 23, 2010	WISE	WISE	EOS	1.8 km	MPC · JPL
727503	2010 HM_{45}	—	April 23, 2010	WISE	WISE	·	3.4 km	MPC · JPL
727504	2010 HP_{45}	—	April 14, 2008	Kitt Peak	Spacewatch	L5	8.1 km	MPC · JPL
727505	2010 HB_{46}	—	April 23, 2010	WISE	WISE	·	4.8 km	MPC · JPL
727506	2010 HJ_{46}	—	April 23, 2010	WISE	WISE	EOS	4.0 km	MPC · JPL
727507	2010 HB_{47}	—	April 23, 2010	WISE	WISE	PHO	2.1 km	MPC · JPL
727508	2010 HK_{47}	—	April 23, 2010	WISE	WISE	·	2.9 km	MPC · JPL
727509	2010 HY_{47}	—	April 24, 2010	WISE	WISE	EUP	2.8 km	MPC · JPL
727510	2010 HN_{48}	—	March 31, 2008	Kitt Peak	Spacewatch	L5	8.5 km	MPC · JPL
727511	2010 HZ_{48}	—	April 24, 2010	WISE	WISE	·	2.5 km	MPC · JPL
727512	2010 HB_{49}	—	April 24, 2010	WISE	WISE	·	2.6 km	MPC · JPL
727513	2010 HH_{49}	—	October 6, 2008	Mount Lemmon	Mount Lemmon Survey	·	2.2 km	MPC · JPL
727514	2010 HP_{49}	—	April 24, 2010	WISE	WISE	·	2.1 km	MPC · JPL
727515	2010 HW_{49}	—	April 24, 2010	WISE	WISE	·	2.6 km	MPC · JPL
727516	2010 HY_{49}	—	April 24, 2010	WISE	WISE	EMA	2.9 km	MPC · JPL
727517	2010 HJ_{51}	—	October 27, 2008	Mount Lemmon	Mount Lemmon Survey	·	3.5 km	MPC · JPL
727518	2010 HK_{51}	—	October 12, 2004	Moletai	K. Černis, Zdanavicius, J.	·	3.2 km	MPC · JPL
727519	2010 HL_{51}	—	February 22, 2006	Catalina	CSS	·	3.3 km	MPC · JPL
727520	2010 HT_{51}	—	July 28, 2005	Palomar	NEAT	·	4.4 km	MPC · JPL
727521	2010 HG_{53}	—	August 29, 2008	Dauban	F. Kugel, C. Rinner	TIR	2.8 km	MPC · JPL
727522	2010 HR_{53}	—	February 17, 2010	Mount Lemmon	Mount Lemmon Survey	LIX	4.1 km	MPC · JPL
727523	2010 HE_{54}	—	April 30, 2006	Kitt Peak	Spacewatch	·	4.2 km	MPC · JPL
727524 Pierrepaquette	2010 HF_{54}	Pierrepaquette	November 14, 2009	La Palma	EURONEAR	·	5.7 km	MPC · JPL
727525	2010 HW_{54}	—	March 11, 2005	Kitt Peak	Spacewatch	·	4.5 km	MPC · JPL
727526	2010 HG_{55}	—	April 25, 2010	WISE	WISE	LIX	2.7 km	MPC · JPL
727527	2010 HO_{55}	—	July 24, 1993	Kitt Peak	Spacewatch	DOR	3.7 km	MPC · JPL
727528	2010 HB_{56}	—	January 7, 2010	Kitt Peak	Spacewatch	·	3.1 km	MPC · JPL
727529	2010 HP_{56}	—	March 19, 2009	Kitt Peak	Spacewatch	LUT	4.2 km	MPC · JPL
727530	2010 HC_{57}	—	April 25, 2010	WISE	WISE	·	4.3 km	MPC · JPL
727531	2010 HV_{57}	—	April 25, 2010	WISE	WISE	·	2.3 km	MPC · JPL
727532	2010 HA_{58}	—	April 25, 2010	WISE	WISE	·	2.3 km	MPC · JPL
727533	2010 HZ_{58}	—	February 9, 2005	Kitt Peak	Spacewatch	·	2.3 km	MPC · JPL
727534	2010 HJ_{59}	—	April 25, 2010	WISE	WISE	PHO	820 m	MPC · JPL
727535	2010 HO_{59}	—	November 14, 2006	Kitt Peak	Spacewatch	·	3.0 km	MPC · JPL
727536	2010 HG_{61}	—	April 26, 2010	WISE	WISE	L5	12 km	MPC · JPL
727537	2010 HD_{63}	—	October 8, 2008	Mount Lemmon	Mount Lemmon Survey	·	3.4 km	MPC · JPL
727538	2010 HH_{63}	—	April 26, 2010	WISE	WISE	ELF	3.7 km	MPC · JPL
727539	2010 HG_{64}	—	April 26, 2010	WISE	WISE	EUP	4.2 km	MPC · JPL
727540	2010 HL_{64}	—	December 21, 2003	Kitt Peak	Spacewatch	·	3.8 km	MPC · JPL
727541	2010 HZ_{64}	—	February 10, 2008	Kitt Peak	Spacewatch	·	6.1 km	MPC · JPL
727542	2010 HX_{65}	—	April 26, 2010	WISE	WISE	·	3.0 km	MPC · JPL
727543	2010 HY_{65}	—	January 8, 2002	Kitt Peak	Spacewatch	·	3.7 km	MPC · JPL
727544	2010 HK_{66}	—	April 26, 2010	WISE	WISE	·	1.7 km	MPC · JPL
727545	2010 HZ_{66}	—	October 4, 2007	Catalina	CSS	·	1.3 km	MPC · JPL
727546	2010 HG_{67}	—	January 15, 2010	Mount Lemmon	Mount Lemmon Survey	·	2.4 km	MPC · JPL
727547	2010 HN_{68}	—	April 27, 2010	WISE	WISE	·	3.3 km	MPC · JPL
727548	2010 HQ_{68}	—	August 29, 2005	Kitt Peak	Spacewatch	·	1.8 km	MPC · JPL
727549	2010 HF_{69}	—	November 1, 2008	Mount Lemmon	Mount Lemmon Survey	·	2.7 km	MPC · JPL
727550	2010 HU_{69}	—	April 27, 2010	WISE	WISE	·	2.8 km	MPC · JPL
727551	2010 HZ_{69}	—	April 27, 2010	WISE	WISE	·	3.1 km	MPC · JPL
727552	2010 HX_{70}	—	April 27, 2010	WISE	WISE	·	2.3 km	MPC · JPL
727553	2010 HP_{71}	—	April 27, 2010	WISE	WISE	·	2.0 km	MPC · JPL
727554	2010 HQ_{71}	—	April 27, 2010	WISE	WISE	·	2.2 km	MPC · JPL
727555	2010 HR_{71}	—	October 10, 2008	Mount Lemmon	Mount Lemmon Survey	·	3.7 km	MPC · JPL
727556	2010 HK_{72}	—	January 12, 2002	Kitt Peak	Spacewatch	·	3.7 km	MPC · JPL
727557	2010 HM_{72}	—	April 27, 2010	WISE	WISE	·	1.9 km	MPC · JPL
727558	2010 HN_{72}	—	April 27, 2010	WISE	WISE	·	3.9 km	MPC · JPL
727559	2010 HW_{73}	—	April 9, 2005	Anderson Mesa	LONEOS	LIX	3.1 km	MPC · JPL
727560	2010 HM_{74}	—	April 28, 2010	WISE	WISE	·	3.8 km	MPC · JPL
727561	2010 HQ_{74}	—	September 26, 2008	Kitt Peak	Spacewatch	·	2.0 km	MPC · JPL
727562	2010 HY_{74}	—	April 28, 2010	WISE	WISE	·	2.4 km	MPC · JPL
727563	2010 HE_{75}	—	January 12, 2008	Kitt Peak	Spacewatch	·	3.3 km	MPC · JPL
727564	2010 HR_{75}	—	April 28, 2010	WISE	WISE	PHO	2.6 km	MPC · JPL
727565	2010 HY_{76}	—	April 17, 2010	Mount Lemmon	Mount Lemmon Survey	·	980 m	MPC · JPL
727566	2010 HG_{77}	—	October 4, 2006	Mount Lemmon	Mount Lemmon Survey	T_{j} (2.97)	3.4 km	MPC · JPL
727567	2010 HJ_{78}	—	February 19, 2010	Mount Lemmon	Mount Lemmon Survey	ADE	1.6 km	MPC · JPL
727568	2010 HW_{78}	—	December 4, 2007	Mount Lemmon	Mount Lemmon Survey	·	3.7 km	MPC · JPL
727569	2010 HB_{82}	—	October 21, 2006	Kitt Peak	Spacewatch	·	4.1 km	MPC · JPL
727570	2010 HK_{82}	—	April 27, 2010	WISE	WISE	·	3.2 km	MPC · JPL
727571	2010 HY_{84}	—	July 3, 2003	Kitt Peak	Spacewatch	·	600 m	MPC · JPL
727572	2010 HE_{85}	—	September 1, 2005	Palomar	NEAT	·	2.0 km	MPC · JPL
727573	2010 HY_{86}	—	April 28, 2010	WISE	WISE	LUT	4.0 km	MPC · JPL
727574	2010 HE_{88}	—	July 30, 2005	Palomar	NEAT	·	2.7 km	MPC · JPL
727575	2010 HJ_{89}	—	October 24, 2008	Catalina	CSS	EOS	2.4 km	MPC · JPL
727576	2010 HQ_{89}	—	November 18, 2008	Kitt Peak	Spacewatch	·	3.9 km	MPC · JPL
727577	2010 HT_{89}	—	April 29, 2010	WISE	WISE	·	2.8 km	MPC · JPL
727578	2010 HD_{90}	—	April 29, 2010	WISE	WISE	T_{j} (2.99)	4.0 km	MPC · JPL
727579	2010 HT_{90}	—	April 29, 2010	WISE	WISE	·	3.4 km	MPC · JPL
727580	2010 HW_{90}	—	April 29, 2010	WISE	WISE	KON	1.9 km	MPC · JPL
727581	2010 HC_{91}	—	April 29, 2010	WISE	WISE	PHO	2.2 km	MPC · JPL
727582	2010 HP_{91}	—	April 29, 2010	WISE	WISE	·	2.4 km	MPC · JPL
727583	2010 HQ_{91}	—	January 12, 2010	Kitt Peak	Spacewatch	·	3.2 km	MPC · JPL
727584	2010 HR_{91}	—	April 29, 2010	WISE	WISE	·	2.6 km	MPC · JPL
727585	2010 HZ_{91}	—	April 29, 2010	WISE	WISE	KON	1.8 km	MPC · JPL
727586	2010 HU_{92}	—	April 29, 2010	WISE	WISE	·	2.5 km	MPC · JPL
727587	2010 HX_{92}	—	January 8, 2010	Kitt Peak	Spacewatch	VER	3.1 km	MPC · JPL
727588	2010 HA_{93}	—	April 29, 2010	WISE	WISE	·	3.8 km	MPC · JPL
727589	2010 HG_{94}	—	September 15, 2002	Kitt Peak	Spacewatch	THM	3.1 km	MPC · JPL
727590	2010 HV_{94}	—	April 21, 2004	Kitt Peak	Spacewatch	·	3.2 km	MPC · JPL
727591	2010 HA_{95}	—	April 29, 2010	WISE	WISE	·	1.6 km	MPC · JPL
727592	2010 HD_{95}	—	March 9, 2005	Mount Lemmon	Mount Lemmon Survey	VER	3.1 km	MPC · JPL
727593	2010 HN_{95}	—	April 29, 2010	WISE	WISE	·	1.9 km	MPC · JPL
727594	2010 HD_{96}	—	April 30, 2010	WISE	WISE	·	4.2 km	MPC · JPL
727595	2010 HT_{96}	—	April 30, 2010	WISE	WISE	·	2.0 km	MPC · JPL
727596	2010 HA_{97}	—	September 17, 2006	Kitt Peak	Spacewatch	·	2.0 km	MPC · JPL
727597	2010 HG_{97}	—	April 30, 2010	WISE	WISE	L5	7.6 km	MPC · JPL
727598	2010 HP_{97}	—	November 21, 2009	Mount Lemmon	Mount Lemmon Survey	EOS	2.2 km	MPC · JPL
727599	2010 HV_{97}	—	April 30, 2010	WISE	WISE	(895)	2.9 km	MPC · JPL
727600	2010 HC_{98}	—	October 22, 2008	Kitt Peak	Spacewatch	·	2.1 km	MPC · JPL

== 727601–727700 ==
back to top

Designation			Discovery			Properties		Ref
Permanent	Provisional	Named after	Date	Site	Discoverer(s)	Category	Diam.	Ref
727601	2010 HK_{98}	—	October 6, 2008	Mount Lemmon	Mount Lemmon Survey	·	2.7 km	MPC · JPL
727602	2010 HO_{98}	—	October 7, 2008	Mount Lemmon	Mount Lemmon Survey	·	2.6 km	MPC · JPL
727603	2010 HR_{98}	—	April 30, 2010	WISE	WISE	·	4.5 km	MPC · JPL
727604	2010 HZ_{98}	—	October 31, 2008	Kitt Peak	Spacewatch	·	3.8 km	MPC · JPL
727605	2010 HL_{99}	—	April 30, 2010	WISE	WISE	·	5.8 km	MPC · JPL
727606	2010 HU_{99}	—	May 4, 2005	Catalina	CSS	·	3.4 km	MPC · JPL
727607	2010 HC_{100}	—	April 30, 2010	WISE	WISE	·	3.4 km	MPC · JPL
727608	2010 HH_{106}	—	May 10, 2003	Kitt Peak	Spacewatch	·	760 m	MPC · JPL
727609	2010 HL_{109}	—	November 21, 2009	Mount Lemmon	Mount Lemmon Survey	EOS	4.4 km	MPC · JPL
727610	2010 HS_{113}	—	October 5, 2012	Haleakala	Pan-STARRS 1	L5	10 km	MPC · JPL
727611	2010 JR	—	May 1, 2010	WISE	WISE	L5	8.1 km	MPC · JPL
727612	2010 JC_{1}	—	January 30, 2008	Mount Lemmon	Mount Lemmon Survey	L5	10 km	MPC · JPL
727613	2010 JZ_{3}	—	May 1, 2010	WISE	WISE	URS	2.9 km	MPC · JPL
727614	2010 JB_{4}	—	November 1, 2008	Mount Lemmon	Mount Lemmon Survey	·	2.7 km	MPC · JPL
727615	2010 JR_{4}	—	May 1, 2010	WISE	WISE	ADE	1.9 km	MPC · JPL
727616	2010 JS_{4}	—	May 1, 2010	WISE	WISE	·	1.6 km	MPC · JPL
727617	2010 JE_{6}	—	May 1, 2010	WISE	WISE	·	1.9 km	MPC · JPL
727618	2010 JK_{6}	—	July 29, 2000	Cerro Tololo	Deep Ecliptic Survey	·	1.9 km	MPC · JPL
727619	2010 JP_{6}	—	May 1, 2010	WISE	WISE	·	2.4 km	MPC · JPL
727620	2010 JQ_{7}	—	January 17, 2008	Mount Lemmon	Mount Lemmon Survey	·	2.8 km	MPC · JPL
727621	2010 JT_{7}	—	October 30, 2008	Catalina	CSS	·	5.4 km	MPC · JPL
727622	2010 JA_{8}	—	February 10, 2010	Kitt Peak	Spacewatch	·	3.3 km	MPC · JPL
727623	2010 JS_{8}	—	December 17, 2003	Kitt Peak	Spacewatch	·	4.0 km	MPC · JPL
727624	2010 JG_{9}	—	May 1, 2010	WISE	WISE	·	3.2 km	MPC · JPL
727625	2010 JA_{12}	—	November 19, 2008	Kitt Peak	Spacewatch	·	3.9 km	MPC · JPL
727626	2010 JH_{13}	—	May 2, 2010	WISE	WISE	·	2.8 km	MPC · JPL
727627	2010 JP_{13}	—	April 1, 2003	Apache Point	SDSS Collaboration	·	3.7 km	MPC · JPL
727628	2010 JC_{14}	—	May 2, 2010	WISE	WISE	LIX	4.0 km	MPC · JPL
727629	2010 JC_{15}	—	May 3, 2010	WISE	WISE	T_{j} (2.98) · EUP	3.7 km	MPC · JPL
727630	2010 JJ_{15}	—	April 10, 2010	Mount Lemmon	Mount Lemmon Survey	ADE	1.5 km	MPC · JPL
727631	2010 JW_{15}	—	December 2, 2008	Mount Lemmon	Mount Lemmon Survey	(1118)	3.6 km	MPC · JPL
727632	2010 JK_{16}	—	September 16, 2013	Mount Lemmon	Mount Lemmon Survey	·	2.5 km	MPC · JPL
727633	2010 JL_{16}	—	January 6, 2010	Kitt Peak	Spacewatch	·	2.3 km	MPC · JPL
727634	2010 JE_{17}	—	May 2, 2010	WISE	WISE	·	2.8 km	MPC · JPL
727635	2010 JS_{17}	—	May 3, 2010	WISE	WISE	KON	2.2 km	MPC · JPL
727636	2010 JA_{19}	—	December 12, 2006	Kitt Peak	Spacewatch	·	3.3 km	MPC · JPL
727637	2010 JF_{19}	—	May 3, 2010	WISE	WISE	·	2.9 km	MPC · JPL
727638	2010 JN_{21}	—	May 3, 2010	WISE	WISE	ADE	1.9 km	MPC · JPL
727639	2010 JX_{21}	—	October 30, 1997	Flagstaff	B. A. Skiff	3:2	5.2 km	MPC · JPL
727640	2010 JB_{23}	—	April 16, 2005	Kitt Peak	Spacewatch	·	3.3 km	MPC · JPL
727641	2010 JH_{23}	—	March 17, 2005	Mount Lemmon	Mount Lemmon Survey	·	3.3 km	MPC · JPL
727642	2010 JZ_{23}	—	January 13, 2010	Mount Lemmon	Mount Lemmon Survey	·	2.7 km	MPC · JPL
727643	2010 JK_{27}	—	May 5, 2010	WISE	WISE	·	2.5 km	MPC · JPL
727644	2010 JZ_{27}	—	May 5, 2010	WISE	WISE	·	2.9 km	MPC · JPL
727645	2010 JQ_{28}	—	May 6, 2010	WISE	WISE	·	2.8 km	MPC · JPL
727646	2010 JT_{28}	—	May 6, 2010	WISE	WISE	·	2.2 km	MPC · JPL
727647	2010 JX_{41}	—	May 7, 2010	WISE	WISE	L5	8.9 km	MPC · JPL
727648	2010 JR_{42}	—	May 8, 2010	WISE	WISE	·	2.8 km	MPC · JPL
727649	2010 JH_{46}	—	November 12, 2001	Apache Point	SDSS Collaboration	(1118)	2.7 km	MPC · JPL
727650	2010 JK_{46}	—	May 7, 2010	Kitt Peak	Spacewatch	·	1.3 km	MPC · JPL
727651	2010 JL_{50}	—	May 6, 2010	WISE	WISE	·	2.9 km	MPC · JPL
727652	2010 JU_{50}	—	December 1, 2008	Kitt Peak	Spacewatch	LIX	2.6 km	MPC · JPL
727653	2010 JA_{51}	—	May 6, 2010	WISE	WISE	·	2.5 km	MPC · JPL
727654	2010 JO_{51}	—	October 10, 2002	Socorro	LINEAR	·	3.7 km	MPC · JPL
727655	2010 JP_{51}	—	February 14, 2010	Mount Lemmon	Mount Lemmon Survey	·	2.8 km	MPC · JPL
727656	2010 JY_{51}	—	April 13, 2004	Kitt Peak	Spacewatch	·	4.0 km	MPC · JPL
727657	2010 JD_{52}	—	October 24, 2008	Mount Lemmon	Mount Lemmon Survey	·	4.2 km	MPC · JPL
727658	2010 JO_{52}	—	March 9, 2005	Catalina	CSS	·	1.3 km	MPC · JPL
727659	2010 JN_{53}	—	September 24, 2007	Kitt Peak	Spacewatch	·	2.3 km	MPC · JPL
727660	2010 JB_{54}	—	April 14, 2005	Kitt Peak	Spacewatch	·	2.2 km	MPC · JPL
727661	2010 JJ_{54}	—	May 7, 2010	WISE	WISE	LIX	3.7 km	MPC · JPL
727662	2010 JM_{54}	—	March 18, 2010	Mount Lemmon	Mount Lemmon Survey	ERI	1.4 km	MPC · JPL
727663	2010 JP_{54}	—	May 6, 2006	Kitt Peak	Spacewatch	·	2.1 km	MPC · JPL
727664	2010 JY_{54}	—	November 26, 2019	Haleakala	Pan-STARRS 1	·	1.2 km	MPC · JPL
727665	2010 JA_{55}	—	February 15, 2010	Mount Lemmon	Mount Lemmon Survey	·	2.3 km	MPC · JPL
727666	2010 JC_{55}	—	May 7, 2010	WISE	WISE	·	2.4 km	MPC · JPL
727667	2010 JH_{55}	—	May 7, 2010	WISE	WISE	·	2.9 km	MPC · JPL
727668	2010 JG_{58}	—	April 17, 2009	Kitt Peak	Spacewatch	URS	5.1 km	MPC · JPL
727669	2010 JR_{59}	—	February 16, 2010	Mount Lemmon	Mount Lemmon Survey	·	2.7 km	MPC · JPL
727670	2010 JX_{59}	—	May 8, 2010	WISE	WISE	·	3.9 km	MPC · JPL
727671	2010 JY_{59}	—	August 21, 2006	Kitt Peak	Spacewatch	·	1.4 km	MPC · JPL
727672	2010 JL_{60}	—	February 2, 2006	Mount Lemmon	Mount Lemmon Survey	·	1.6 km	MPC · JPL
727673	2010 JO_{60}	—	May 8, 2010	WISE	WISE	·	3.4 km	MPC · JPL
727674	2010 JP_{61}	—	October 3, 2008	Mount Lemmon	Mount Lemmon Survey	·	4.1 km	MPC · JPL
727675	2010 JS_{61}	—	April 25, 2004	Socorro	LINEAR	·	3.4 km	MPC · JPL
727676	2010 JB_{62}	—	May 8, 2010	WISE	WISE	·	2.0 km	MPC · JPL
727677	2010 JX_{62}	—	September 12, 2005	Kitt Peak	Spacewatch	·	3.8 km	MPC · JPL
727678	2010 JB_{63}	—	May 8, 2010	WISE	WISE	(260)	4.2 km	MPC · JPL
727679	2010 JD_{63}	—	August 28, 2006	Siding Spring	SSS	·	2.0 km	MPC · JPL
727680	2010 JE_{63}	—	August 26, 2005	Palomar	NEAT	EMA	4.3 km	MPC · JPL
727681	2010 JR_{63}	—	May 8, 2010	WISE	WISE	HOF	2.4 km	MPC · JPL
727682	2010 JD_{64}	—	May 8, 2010	WISE	WISE	·	2.6 km	MPC · JPL
727683	2010 JQ_{64}	—	May 8, 2010	WISE	WISE	T_{j} (2.98) · EUP	3.0 km	MPC · JPL
727684	2010 JW_{64}	—	January 11, 2010	Kitt Peak	Spacewatch	·	4.8 km	MPC · JPL
727685	2010 JP_{66}	—	February 14, 2010	Mount Lemmon	Mount Lemmon Survey	·	2.5 km	MPC · JPL
727686	2010 JZ_{66}	—	May 9, 2010	WISE	WISE	·	2.4 km	MPC · JPL
727687	2010 JN_{68}	—	May 9, 2010	WISE	WISE	·	3.1 km	MPC · JPL
727688	2010 JK_{69}	—	May 9, 2010	WISE	WISE	·	1.1 km	MPC · JPL
727689	2010 JP_{69}	—	May 9, 2010	WISE	WISE	·	3.2 km	MPC · JPL
727690	2010 JV_{69}	—	May 9, 2010	WISE	WISE	T_{j} (2.97) · 3:2	3.2 km	MPC · JPL
727691	2010 JY_{69}	—	May 9, 2010	WISE	WISE	·	3.2 km	MPC · JPL
727692	2010 JY_{70}	—	May 9, 2010	WISE	WISE	·	3.9 km	MPC · JPL
727693	2010 JZ_{73}	—	April 8, 2010	Kitt Peak	Spacewatch	·	960 m	MPC · JPL
727694	2010 JE_{74}	—	May 11, 2010	Kitt Peak	Spacewatch	·	3.2 km	MPC · JPL
727695	2010 JE_{76}	—	October 9, 2002	Anderson Mesa	LONEOS	·	2.8 km	MPC · JPL
727696	2010 JZ_{80}	—	May 10, 2010	WISE	WISE	L5	8.4 km	MPC · JPL
727697	2010 JE_{81}	—	December 31, 2008	Mount Lemmon	Mount Lemmon Survey	·	3.1 km	MPC · JPL
727698	2010 JF_{81}	—	March 10, 2008	Mount Lemmon	Mount Lemmon Survey	L5	7.9 km	MPC · JPL
727699	2010 JD_{83}	—	April 9, 2010	Mount Lemmon	Mount Lemmon Survey	WAT	1.8 km	MPC · JPL
727700	2010 JT_{83}	—	November 2, 2007	Mount Lemmon	Mount Lemmon Survey	·	960 m	MPC · JPL

== 727701–727800 ==
back to top

Designation			Discovery			Properties		Ref
Permanent	Provisional	Named after	Date	Site	Discoverer(s)	Category	Diam.	Ref
727701	2010 JB_{86}	—	May 10, 2010	WISE	WISE	·	860 m	MPC · JPL
727702	2010 JN_{86}	—	April 14, 2005	Catalina	CSS	·	3.2 km	MPC · JPL
727703	2010 JW_{86}	—	November 30, 2005	Mount Lemmon	Mount Lemmon Survey	·	1.4 km	MPC · JPL
727704	2010 JE_{90}	—	May 10, 2010	WISE	WISE	·	2.3 km	MPC · JPL
727705	2010 JT_{90}	—	April 1, 2003	Apache Point	SDSS Collaboration	·	4.1 km	MPC · JPL
727706	2010 JX_{90}	—	March 26, 2006	Siding Spring	SSS	·	1.4 km	MPC · JPL
727707	2010 JZ_{90}	—	May 10, 2010	WISE	WISE	·	3.7 km	MPC · JPL
727708	2010 JG_{92}	—	May 10, 2010	WISE	WISE	·	2.4 km	MPC · JPL
727709	2010 JH_{92}	—	April 2, 2009	Mount Lemmon	Mount Lemmon Survey	·	3.1 km	MPC · JPL
727710	2010 JK_{92}	—	August 30, 2005	Palomar	NEAT	EMA	3.8 km	MPC · JPL
727711	2010 JL_{92}	—	May 10, 2010	WISE	WISE	·	2.6 km	MPC · JPL
727712	2010 JR_{92}	—	October 26, 2011	Haleakala	Pan-STARRS 1	·	3.4 km	MPC · JPL
727713	2010 JJ_{93}	—	May 10, 2010	WISE	WISE	·	3.9 km	MPC · JPL
727714	2010 JQ_{93}	—	April 21, 2014	Mount Lemmon	Mount Lemmon Survey	·	3.8 km	MPC · JPL
727715	2010 JS_{93}	—	May 10, 2010	WISE	WISE	·	2.6 km	MPC · JPL
727716	2010 JX_{93}	—	February 14, 2009	Mount Lemmon	Mount Lemmon Survey	·	4.2 km	MPC · JPL
727717	2010 JD_{95}	—	May 10, 2010	WISE	WISE	·	1.8 km	MPC · JPL
727718	2010 JN_{95}	—	August 8, 2005	Cerro Tololo	Deep Ecliptic Survey	SYL	4.1 km	MPC · JPL
727719	2010 JS_{95}	—	May 10, 2010	WISE	WISE	HOF	2.2 km	MPC · JPL
727720	2010 JV_{95}	—	April 5, 2005	Mount Lemmon	Mount Lemmon Survey	·	1.2 km	MPC · JPL
727721	2010 JC_{97}	—	May 11, 2010	WISE	WISE	·	3.1 km	MPC · JPL
727722	2010 JM_{97}	—	February 19, 2010	Catalina	CSS	·	2.3 km	MPC · JPL
727723	2010 JA_{98}	—	May 11, 2010	WISE	WISE	ARM	3.5 km	MPC · JPL
727724	2010 JB_{98}	—	September 23, 2005	Kitt Peak	Spacewatch	·	3.4 km	MPC · JPL
727725	2010 JL_{99}	—	October 24, 2008	Kitt Peak	Spacewatch	·	2.0 km	MPC · JPL
727726	2010 JM_{99}	—	May 11, 2010	WISE	WISE	PHO	3.8 km	MPC · JPL
727727	2010 JQ_{99}	—	September 27, 2005	Kitt Peak	Spacewatch	·	3.2 km	MPC · JPL
727728	2010 JG_{101}	—	October 29, 2005	Mount Lemmon	Mount Lemmon Survey	(260)	3.0 km	MPC · JPL
727729	2010 JT_{101}	—	May 11, 2010	WISE	WISE	·	1.9 km	MPC · JPL
727730	2010 JL_{102}	—	October 8, 2004	Kitt Peak	Spacewatch	·	2.0 km	MPC · JPL
727731	2010 JN_{103}	—	August 28, 2005	Kitt Peak	Spacewatch	·	3.0 km	MPC · JPL
727732	2010 JS_{103}	—	May 11, 2010	WISE	WISE	·	1.4 km	MPC · JPL
727733	2010 JB_{104}	—	May 11, 2010	WISE	WISE	·	3.5 km	MPC · JPL
727734	2010 JH_{104}	—	May 12, 2010	WISE	WISE	·	3.1 km	MPC · JPL
727735	2010 JD_{105}	—	March 26, 2009	Kitt Peak	Spacewatch	·	4.2 km	MPC · JPL
727736 Fus	2010 JF_{106}	Fus	February 20, 2010	Roque de los Muchachos	EURONEAR	VER	3.2 km	MPC · JPL
727737	2010 JY_{106}	—	May 12, 2010	WISE	WISE	LUT	4.5 km	MPC · JPL
727738	2010 JC_{107}	—	March 31, 2003	Apache Point	SDSS Collaboration	·	2.7 km	MPC · JPL
727739	2010 JD_{107}	—	May 12, 2010	WISE	WISE	·	2.2 km	MPC · JPL
727740	2010 JU_{107}	—	February 6, 2010	Mount Lemmon	Mount Lemmon Survey	·	3.4 km	MPC · JPL
727741	2010 JG_{108}	—	November 1, 2005	Mount Lemmon	Mount Lemmon Survey	·	3.4 km	MPC · JPL
727742	2010 JW_{108}	—	May 12, 2010	WISE	WISE	·	4.9 km	MPC · JPL
727743	2010 JC_{109}	—	August 24, 2003	Palomar	NEAT	·	3.0 km	MPC · JPL
727744	2010 JW_{109}	—	April 12, 2010	Mount Lemmon	Mount Lemmon Survey	·	1.9 km	MPC · JPL
727745	2010 JN_{112}	—	May 13, 2010	Kitt Peak	Spacewatch	·	1.7 km	MPC · JPL
727746	2010 JQ_{112}	—	May 13, 2010	Siding Spring	SSS	·	700 m	MPC · JPL
727747	2010 JS_{113}	—	May 7, 2010	Mount Lemmon	Mount Lemmon Survey	·	1.1 km	MPC · JPL
727748	2010 JM_{117}	—	May 6, 2010	Kitt Peak	Spacewatch	EOS	1.6 km	MPC · JPL
727749	2010 JP_{117}	—	April 14, 2010	Kitt Peak	Spacewatch	·	570 m	MPC · JPL
727750	2010 JX_{118}	—	May 11, 2010	Mount Lemmon	Mount Lemmon Survey	·	560 m	MPC · JPL
727751	2010 JN_{119}	—	November 20, 2007	Catalina	CSS	·	1.8 km	MPC · JPL
727752	2010 JU_{120}	—	May 12, 2010	Mount Lemmon	Mount Lemmon Survey	·	580 m	MPC · JPL
727753	2010 JP_{121}	—	May 12, 2010	Mount Lemmon	Mount Lemmon Survey	·	2.9 km	MPC · JPL
727754	2010 JK_{122}	—	May 13, 2010	Mount Lemmon	Mount Lemmon Survey	·	2.8 km	MPC · JPL
727755	2010 JM_{123}	—	May 13, 2010	WISE	WISE	L5	8.6 km	MPC · JPL
727756	2010 JO_{123}	—	May 11, 2005	Palomar	NEAT	EUP	4.6 km	MPC · JPL
727757	2010 JL_{124}	—	September 20, 2001	Apache Point	SDSS Collaboration	·	3.3 km	MPC · JPL
727758	2010 JS_{124}	—	May 12, 2010	WISE	WISE	·	2.5 km	MPC · JPL
727759	2010 JX_{125}	—	May 12, 2010	WISE	WISE	VER	2.5 km	MPC · JPL
727760	2010 JV_{126}	—	March 1, 2009	Mount Lemmon	Mount Lemmon Survey	·	1.7 km	MPC · JPL
727761	2010 JF_{127}	—	May 13, 2010	WISE	WISE	·	2.9 km	MPC · JPL
727762	2010 JN_{127}	—	May 13, 2010	WISE	WISE	·	2.9 km	MPC · JPL
727763	2010 JU_{128}	—	May 13, 2010	WISE	WISE	EOS	1.7 km	MPC · JPL
727764	2010 JL_{129}	—	May 13, 2010	WISE	WISE	·	2.3 km	MPC · JPL
727765	2010 JH_{130}	—	November 24, 2006	Mount Lemmon	Mount Lemmon Survey	·	4.4 km	MPC · JPL
727766	2010 JJ_{132}	—	May 13, 2010	WISE	WISE	·	3.8 km	MPC · JPL
727767	2010 JT_{132}	—	May 13, 2010	WISE	WISE	·	2.2 km	MPC · JPL
727768	2010 JQ_{133}	—	September 11, 2007	Kitt Peak	Spacewatch	·	2.4 km	MPC · JPL
727769	2010 JX_{134}	—	October 12, 2007	Mount Lemmon	Mount Lemmon Survey	·	3.1 km	MPC · JPL
727770	2010 JZ_{134}	—	February 17, 2010	Mount Lemmon	Mount Lemmon Survey	LIX	2.8 km	MPC · JPL
727771	2010 JE_{135}	—	May 14, 2010	WISE	WISE	·	3.0 km	MPC · JPL
727772	2010 JZ_{135}	—	May 14, 2010	WISE	WISE	ELF	3.2 km	MPC · JPL
727773	2010 JJ_{136}	—	May 14, 2010	WISE	WISE	·	2.5 km	MPC · JPL
727774	2010 JT_{136}	—	May 14, 2010	WISE	WISE	·	2.3 km	MPC · JPL
727775	2010 JB_{137}	—	May 14, 2010	WISE	WISE	·	2.1 km	MPC · JPL
727776	2010 JV_{137}	—	October 7, 2007	Mount Lemmon	Mount Lemmon Survey	·	690 m	MPC · JPL
727777	2010 JG_{138}	—	December 31, 2008	Mount Lemmon	Mount Lemmon Survey	·	2.1 km	MPC · JPL
727778	2010 JH_{138}	—	May 14, 2010	WISE	WISE	·	2.3 km	MPC · JPL
727779	2010 JN_{138}	—	May 14, 2010	WISE	WISE	·	2.5 km	MPC · JPL
727780	2010 JZ_{138}	—	October 22, 2006	Catalina	CSS	ADE	2.2 km	MPC · JPL
727781	2010 JE_{141}	—	March 4, 2006	Kitt Peak	Spacewatch	·	1.5 km	MPC · JPL
727782	2010 JP_{141}	—	May 15, 2010	WISE	WISE	·	1.4 km	MPC · JPL
727783	2010 JV_{142}	—	May 15, 2010	WISE	WISE	DOR	2.2 km	MPC · JPL
727784	2010 JA_{143}	—	May 15, 2010	WISE	WISE	·	1.6 km	MPC · JPL
727785	2010 JC_{143}	—	May 15, 2010	WISE	WISE	·	1.4 km	MPC · JPL
727786	2010 JJ_{144}	—	May 15, 2010	WISE	WISE	SUL	2.3 km	MPC · JPL
727787	2010 JO_{144}	—	May 15, 2010	WISE	WISE	T_{j} (2.99)	3.9 km	MPC · JPL
727788	2010 JA_{146}	—	May 15, 2010	WISE	WISE	·	4.3 km	MPC · JPL
727789	2010 JG_{146}	—	July 14, 2001	Palomar	NEAT	·	1.8 km	MPC · JPL
727790	2010 JN_{146}	—	May 15, 2010	WISE	WISE	·	2.9 km	MPC · JPL
727791	2010 JA_{150}	—	May 9, 2010	Mount Lemmon	Mount Lemmon Survey	·	1.7 km	MPC · JPL
727792	2010 JF_{160}	—	May 5, 2010	Mount Lemmon	Mount Lemmon Survey	·	660 m	MPC · JPL
727793	2010 JC_{163}	—	May 8, 2010	Mount Lemmon	Mount Lemmon Survey	·	1.4 km	MPC · JPL
727794	2010 JQ_{164}	—	November 24, 2003	Kitt Peak	Spacewatch	·	1.9 km	MPC · JPL
727795	2010 JU_{165}	—	February 15, 2010	WISE	WISE	·	2.7 km	MPC · JPL
727796	2010 JG_{168}	—	May 12, 2010	Kitt Peak	Spacewatch	·	2.3 km	MPC · JPL
727797	2010 JV_{169}	—	May 6, 2010	La Sagra	OAM	PHO	980 m	MPC · JPL
727798	2010 JO_{171}	—	May 5, 2010	Mount Lemmon	Mount Lemmon Survey	·	1.3 km	MPC · JPL
727799	2010 JQ_{177}	—	May 4, 2010	Palomar	Palomar Transient Factory	·	1.6 km	MPC · JPL
727800	2010 JY_{178}	—	March 31, 2014	Mount Lemmon	Mount Lemmon Survey	·	1.0 km	MPC · JPL

== 727801–727900 ==
back to top

Designation			Discovery			Properties		Ref
Permanent	Provisional	Named after	Date	Site	Discoverer(s)	Category	Diam.	Ref
727801	2010 JG_{179}	—	September 18, 2001	Anderson Mesa	LONEOS	·	2.2 km	MPC · JPL
727802	2010 JY_{180}	—	February 7, 2013	Nogales	M. Schwartz, P. R. Holvorcem	·	1.3 km	MPC · JPL
727803	2010 JH_{183}	—	December 23, 2016	Haleakala	Pan-STARRS 1	L5	7.6 km	MPC · JPL
727804	2010 JL_{183}	—	August 30, 2016	Mount Lemmon	Mount Lemmon Survey	·	2.4 km	MPC · JPL
727805	2010 JP_{184}	—	February 14, 2013	Haleakala	Pan-STARRS 1	·	1.1 km	MPC · JPL
727806	2010 JA_{185}	—	October 23, 2013	Mount Lemmon	Mount Lemmon Survey	·	2.4 km	MPC · JPL
727807	2010 JX_{188}	—	February 14, 2010	Mount Lemmon	Mount Lemmon Survey	·	2.4 km	MPC · JPL
727808	2010 JX_{210}	—	May 11, 2010	Mount Lemmon	Mount Lemmon Survey	·	640 m	MPC · JPL
727809	2010 JJ_{212}	—	October 26, 2011	Haleakala	Pan-STARRS 1	·	1.1 km	MPC · JPL
727810	2010 JM_{213}	—	May 7, 2014	Haleakala	Pan-STARRS 1	·	1.3 km	MPC · JPL
727811	2010 KG	—	December 10, 2004	Bergisch Gladbach	W. Bickel	·	4.3 km	MPC · JPL
727812	2010 KH_{1}	—	May 16, 2010	WISE	WISE	·	2.2 km	MPC · JPL
727813	2010 KL_{1}	—	May 16, 2010	WISE	WISE	·	3.7 km	MPC · JPL
727814	2010 KM_{1}	—	February 13, 2010	Catalina	CSS	EUN	2.5 km	MPC · JPL
727815	2010 KR_{1}	—	August 3, 2000	Kitt Peak	Spacewatch	·	2.3 km	MPC · JPL
727816	2010 KS_{1}	—	May 16, 2010	WISE	WISE	·	2.6 km	MPC · JPL
727817	2010 KT_{1}	—	October 29, 2008	Kitt Peak	Spacewatch	HOF	3.0 km	MPC · JPL
727818	2010 KH_{2}	—	May 16, 2010	WISE	WISE	·	2.2 km	MPC · JPL
727819	2010 KL_{3}	—	September 14, 1998	Kitt Peak	Spacewatch	HOF	2.6 km	MPC · JPL
727820	2010 KR_{3}	—	November 21, 2008	Kitt Peak	Spacewatch	·	2.2 km	MPC · JPL
727821	2010 KD_{4}	—	May 16, 2010	WISE	WISE	PHO	1.8 km	MPC · JPL
727822	2010 KC_{5}	—	April 21, 2009	Mount Lemmon	Mount Lemmon Survey	·	1.8 km	MPC · JPL
727823	2010 KA_{6}	—	May 11, 2007	Mount Lemmon	Mount Lemmon Survey	PHO	980 m	MPC · JPL
727824	2010 KB_{6}	—	May 16, 2010	WISE	WISE	PHO	1.0 km	MPC · JPL
727825	2010 KF_{6}	—	May 16, 2010	WISE	WISE	·	2.6 km	MPC · JPL
727826	2010 KC_{7}	—	May 16, 2010	WISE	WISE	·	2.7 km	MPC · JPL
727827	2010 KH_{7}	—	January 21, 2015	Haleakala	Pan-STARRS 1	·	2.9 km	MPC · JPL
727828	2010 KL_{7}	—	May 16, 2010	WISE	WISE	·	2.9 km	MPC · JPL
727829	2010 KS_{7}	—	May 17, 2010	WISE	WISE	·	2.2 km	MPC · JPL
727830	2010 KZ_{11}	—	May 18, 2010	WISE	WISE	EUP	5.1 km	MPC · JPL
727831	2010 KL_{12}	—	October 27, 2005	Catalina	CSS	LIX	3.8 km	MPC · JPL
727832	2010 KW_{12}	—	May 16, 2010	WISE	WISE	·	4.2 km	MPC · JPL
727833	2010 KX_{13}	—	May 16, 2010	WISE	WISE	·	2.3 km	MPC · JPL
727834	2010 KG_{14}	—	April 13, 2010	Mount Lemmon	Mount Lemmon Survey	·	3.8 km	MPC · JPL
727835	2010 KP_{14}	—	May 17, 2010	WISE	WISE	·	3.5 km	MPC · JPL
727836	2010 KH_{15}	—	May 17, 2010	WISE	WISE	·	3.8 km	MPC · JPL
727837	2010 KJ_{15}	—	May 17, 2010	WISE	WISE	EOS	2.6 km	MPC · JPL
727838	2010 KQ_{15}	—	April 9, 2005	Mount Lemmon	Mount Lemmon Survey	·	2.3 km	MPC · JPL
727839	2010 KR_{15}	—	February 27, 2006	Mount Lemmon	Mount Lemmon Survey	·	1.1 km	MPC · JPL
727840	2010 KZ_{15}	—	September 2, 2005	Palomar	NEAT	ELF	5.0 km	MPC · JPL
727841	2010 KE_{16}	—	May 17, 2010	WISE	WISE	·	680 m	MPC · JPL
727842	2010 KS_{16}	—	May 17, 2010	WISE	WISE	·	2.2 km	MPC · JPL
727843	2010 KO_{17}	—	May 17, 2010	WISE	WISE	·	2.2 km	MPC · JPL
727844	2010 KY_{17}	—	May 17, 2010	WISE	WISE	T_{j} (2.98)	3.8 km	MPC · JPL
727845	2010 KW_{18}	—	May 17, 2010	WISE	WISE	·	5.9 km	MPC · JPL
727846	2010 KF_{19}	—	August 19, 2002	Palomar	NEAT	NAE	2.7 km	MPC · JPL
727847	2010 KY_{19}	—	April 29, 2008	Mount Lemmon	Mount Lemmon Survey	SYL	6.1 km	MPC · JPL
727848	2010 KD_{21}	—	May 17, 2010	WISE	WISE	·	2.7 km	MPC · JPL
727849	2010 KF_{21}	—	May 17, 2010	WISE	WISE	·	2.6 km	MPC · JPL
727850	2010 KK_{21}	—	May 17, 2010	WISE	WISE	·	3.1 km	MPC · JPL
727851	2010 KR_{22}	—	March 12, 2006	Siding Spring	SSS	·	1.5 km	MPC · JPL
727852	2010 KC_{23}	—	May 18, 2010	WISE	WISE	·	1.7 km	MPC · JPL
727853	2010 KP_{23}	—	May 18, 2010	WISE	WISE	EOS	1.6 km	MPC · JPL
727854	2010 KA_{24}	—	October 28, 2008	Mount Lemmon	Mount Lemmon Survey	KON	2.3 km	MPC · JPL
727855	2010 KQ_{24}	—	January 13, 2015	Haleakala	Pan-STARRS 1	HYG	3.5 km	MPC · JPL
727856	2010 KD_{25}	—	December 22, 2008	Dauban	C. Rinner, Kugel, F.	·	4.1 km	MPC · JPL
727857	2010 KE_{25}	—	November 1, 2008	Mount Lemmon	Mount Lemmon Survey	EMA	2.5 km	MPC · JPL
727858	2010 KL_{25}	—	March 22, 2006	Catalina	CSS	·	3.0 km	MPC · JPL
727859	2010 KO_{25}	—	May 18, 2010	WISE	WISE	EUN	3.2 km	MPC · JPL
727860	2010 KH_{26}	—	May 18, 2010	WISE	WISE	·	3.5 km	MPC · JPL
727861	2010 KU_{26}	—	April 6, 2005	Kitt Peak	Spacewatch	·	2.7 km	MPC · JPL
727862	2010 KD_{27}	—	May 18, 2010	WISE	WISE	·	3.4 km	MPC · JPL
727863	2010 KE_{27}	—	November 6, 2016	Haleakala	Pan-STARRS 1	·	2.8 km	MPC · JPL
727864	2010 KX_{28}	—	October 26, 2008	Kitt Peak	Spacewatch	·	3.3 km	MPC · JPL
727865	2010 KL_{31}	—	May 19, 2010	WISE	WISE	·	3.5 km	MPC · JPL
727866	2010 KU_{31}	—	November 7, 2008	Mount Lemmon	Mount Lemmon Survey	EOS	3.4 km	MPC · JPL
727867	2010 KT_{33}	—	May 19, 2010	WISE	WISE	·	3.0 km	MPC · JPL
727868	2010 KN_{34}	—	May 19, 2010	WISE	WISE	·	3.5 km	MPC · JPL
727869	2010 KX_{34}	—	May 19, 2010	WISE	WISE	·	3.2 km	MPC · JPL
727870	2010 KQ_{35}	—	March 15, 2010	Siding Spring	SSS	·	4.1 km	MPC · JPL
727871	2010 KT_{35}	—	November 3, 2003	Apache Point	SDSS Collaboration	·	4.7 km	MPC · JPL
727872	2010 KX_{41}	—	September 29, 2005	Mount Lemmon	Mount Lemmon Survey	HYG	3.6 km	MPC · JPL
727873	2010 KA_{42}	—	May 20, 2010	WISE	WISE	·	2.0 km	MPC · JPL
727874	2010 KE_{42}	—	May 20, 2010	WISE	WISE	·	2.4 km	MPC · JPL
727875	2010 KZ_{42}	—	May 20, 2010	WISE	WISE	·	2.7 km	MPC · JPL
727876	2010 KJ_{43}	—	November 24, 2006	Mount Lemmon	Mount Lemmon Survey	·	2.9 km	MPC · JPL
727877	2010 KX_{43}	—	May 20, 2010	WISE	WISE	EUP	4.7 km	MPC · JPL
727878	2010 KD_{44}	—	December 17, 2007	Mount Lemmon	Mount Lemmon Survey	·	2.6 km	MPC · JPL
727879	2010 KK_{44}	—	May 20, 2010	WISE	WISE	·	3.5 km	MPC · JPL
727880	2010 KO_{44}	—	May 20, 2010	WISE	WISE	·	2.6 km	MPC · JPL
727881	2010 KQ_{44}	—	January 30, 2008	Mount Lemmon	Mount Lemmon Survey	·	3.9 km	MPC · JPL
727882	2010 KR_{44}	—	May 20, 2010	WISE	WISE	·	4.8 km	MPC · JPL
727883	2010 KW_{44}	—	May 17, 2009	Mount Lemmon	Mount Lemmon Survey	·	5.0 km	MPC · JPL
727884	2010 KX_{45}	—	August 29, 2005	Kitt Peak	Spacewatch	·	1.7 km	MPC · JPL
727885	2010 KV_{46}	—	January 16, 2013	Haleakala	Pan-STARRS 1	·	2.6 km	MPC · JPL
727886	2010 KU_{49}	—	May 22, 2010	WISE	WISE	·	4.0 km	MPC · JPL
727887	2010 KH_{51}	—	September 6, 1999	Kitt Peak	Spacewatch	·	3.4 km	MPC · JPL
727888	2010 KS_{51}	—	November 2, 2008	Mount Lemmon	Mount Lemmon Survey	·	3.9 km	MPC · JPL
727889	2010 KZ_{51}	—	April 20, 2009	Mount Lemmon	Mount Lemmon Survey	·	3.0 km	MPC · JPL
727890	2010 KG_{52}	—	May 22, 2010	WISE	WISE	·	2.1 km	MPC · JPL
727891	2010 KN_{52}	—	May 15, 2005	Palomar	NEAT	·	3.6 km	MPC · JPL
727892	2010 KB_{53}	—	May 23, 2010	WISE	WISE	ADE	2.4 km	MPC · JPL
727893	2010 KD_{54}	—	May 23, 2010	WISE	WISE	·	1.8 km	MPC · JPL
727894	2010 KP_{54}	—	May 23, 2010	WISE	WISE	·	2.9 km	MPC · JPL
727895	2010 KD_{56}	—	May 23, 2010	WISE	WISE	·	2.3 km	MPC · JPL
727896	2010 KN_{56}	—	December 22, 2008	Mount Lemmon	Mount Lemmon Survey	·	2.6 km	MPC · JPL
727897	2010 KC_{57}	—	May 20, 2010	WISE	WISE	·	2.6 km	MPC · JPL
727898	2010 KD_{57}	—	November 19, 2008	Kitt Peak	Spacewatch	·	3.2 km	MPC · JPL
727899	2010 KR_{60}	—	May 25, 2010	WISE	WISE	EUP	3.6 km	MPC · JPL
727900	2010 KS_{60}	—	May 25, 2010	WISE	WISE	EUP	4.1 km	MPC · JPL

== 727901–728000 ==
back to top

Designation			Discovery			Properties		Ref
Permanent	Provisional	Named after	Date	Site	Discoverer(s)	Category	Diam.	Ref
727901	2010 KL_{61}	—	May 28, 2010	WISE	WISE	·	5.4 km	MPC · JPL
727902	2010 KU_{61}	—	December 22, 2000	Kitt Peak	Spacewatch	·	5.7 km	MPC · JPL
727903	2010 KP_{62}	—	May 23, 2010	WISE	WISE	·	2.9 km	MPC · JPL
727904	2010 KH_{63}	—	May 23, 2010	WISE	WISE	·	2.8 km	MPC · JPL
727905	2010 KS_{63}	—	May 23, 2010	WISE	WISE	·	3.5 km	MPC · JPL
727906	2010 KY_{63}	—	May 23, 2010	WISE	WISE	·	1.6 km	MPC · JPL
727907	2010 KG_{64}	—	October 21, 2006	Mount Lemmon	Mount Lemmon Survey	·	3.9 km	MPC · JPL
727908	2010 KO_{64}	—	May 24, 2010	WISE	WISE	·	3.6 km	MPC · JPL
727909	2010 KQ_{64}	—	March 17, 2010	Bergisch Gladbach	W. Bickel	·	3.9 km	MPC · JPL
727910	2010 KK_{65}	—	May 24, 2010	WISE	WISE	·	2.7 km	MPC · JPL
727911	2010 KY_{67}	—	May 24, 2010	WISE	WISE	·	2.6 km	MPC · JPL
727912	2010 KD_{68}	—	May 24, 2010	WISE	WISE	PHO	1.9 km	MPC · JPL
727913	2010 KW_{69}	—	May 24, 2010	WISE	WISE	·	4.7 km	MPC · JPL
727914	2010 KF_{70}	—	March 12, 2010	Catalina	CSS	THB	2.8 km	MPC · JPL
727915	2010 KT_{70}	—	October 5, 2005	Catalina	CSS	·	4.3 km	MPC · JPL
727916	2010 KA_{71}	—	May 24, 2010	WISE	WISE	·	3.0 km	MPC · JPL
727917	2010 KG_{71}	—	May 24, 2010	WISE	WISE	·	3.2 km	MPC · JPL
727918	2010 KN_{71}	—	May 24, 2010	WISE	WISE	LIX	4.0 km	MPC · JPL
727919	2010 KO_{71}	—	August 15, 1993	Kitt Peak	Spacewatch	T_{j} (2.99)	2.9 km	MPC · JPL
727920	2010 KV_{72}	—	February 18, 2010	Kitt Peak	Spacewatch	·	2.7 km	MPC · JPL
727921	2010 KE_{74}	—	May 25, 2010	WISE	WISE	·	3.3 km	MPC · JPL
727922	2010 KJ_{74}	—	May 25, 2010	WISE	WISE	·	1.0 km	MPC · JPL
727923	2010 KQ_{74}	—	May 24, 2001	Apache Point	SDSS Collaboration	·	1.8 km	MPC · JPL
727924	2010 KU_{74}	—	February 10, 2010	Kitt Peak	Spacewatch	·	3.0 km	MPC · JPL
727925	2010 KD_{75}	—	May 25, 2010	WISE	WISE	CLA	1.3 km	MPC · JPL
727926	2010 KB_{76}	—	May 25, 2010	WISE	WISE	·	3.7 km	MPC · JPL
727927	2010 KJ_{76}	—	July 8, 2014	Haleakala	Pan-STARRS 1	·	1.2 km	MPC · JPL
727928	2010 KO_{76}	—	May 25, 2010	WISE	WISE	·	1.8 km	MPC · JPL
727929	2010 KU_{77}	—	May 25, 2010	WISE	WISE	DOR	2.7 km	MPC · JPL
727930	2010 KJ_{78}	—	March 19, 2010	Catalina	CSS	·	3.8 km	MPC · JPL
727931	2010 KG_{79}	—	May 25, 2010	WISE	WISE	·	3.3 km	MPC · JPL
727932	2010 KN_{80}	—	February 14, 2010	Catalina	CSS	·	4.1 km	MPC · JPL
727933	2010 KW_{80}	—	May 26, 2010	WISE	WISE	·	3.0 km	MPC · JPL
727934	2010 KZ_{80}	—	April 24, 2009	Mount Lemmon	Mount Lemmon Survey	·	3.2 km	MPC · JPL
727935	2010 KF_{82}	—	October 3, 2013	Kitt Peak	Spacewatch	·	3.3 km	MPC · JPL
727936	2010 KU_{82}	—	September 10, 2007	Mount Lemmon	Mount Lemmon Survey	·	4.7 km	MPC · JPL
727937	2010 KA_{83}	—	October 3, 2006	Mount Lemmon	Mount Lemmon Survey	·	1.8 km	MPC · JPL
727938	2010 KJ_{83}	—	May 4, 2009	Mount Lemmon	Mount Lemmon Survey	LIX	3.1 km	MPC · JPL
727939	2010 KP_{83}	—	April 21, 2009	Kitt Peak	Spacewatch	·	2.8 km	MPC · JPL
727940	2010 KE_{84}	—	May 26, 2010	WISE	WISE	·	2.3 km	MPC · JPL
727941	2010 KJ_{84}	—	September 14, 2007	Catalina	CSS	NAE	3.3 km	MPC · JPL
727942	2010 KQ_{85}	—	May 26, 2010	WISE	WISE	URS	3.5 km	MPC · JPL
727943	2010 KT_{85}	—	April 17, 2009	Catalina	CSS	·	3.0 km	MPC · JPL
727944	2010 KY_{85}	—	December 17, 2003	Kitt Peak	Spacewatch	·	3.8 km	MPC · JPL
727945	2010 KA_{86}	—	May 26, 2010	WISE	WISE	·	2.9 km	MPC · JPL
727946	2010 KD_{86}	—	October 30, 2008	Kitt Peak	Spacewatch	HYG	2.2 km	MPC · JPL
727947	2010 KO_{86}	—	May 26, 2010	WISE	WISE	·	2.9 km	MPC · JPL
727948	2010 KW_{86}	—	May 26, 2010	WISE	WISE	·	4.4 km	MPC · JPL
727949	2010 KD_{87}	—	May 26, 2010	WISE	WISE	·	2.0 km	MPC · JPL
727950	2010 KY_{87}	—	July 27, 2005	Palomar	NEAT	·	2.0 km	MPC · JPL
727951	2010 KF_{89}	—	June 5, 2010	Kitt Peak	Spacewatch	·	2.1 km	MPC · JPL
727952	2010 KL_{89}	—	May 27, 2010	WISE	WISE	·	1.9 km	MPC · JPL
727953	2010 KM_{89}	—	May 27, 2010	WISE	WISE	·	3.4 km	MPC · JPL
727954	2010 KG_{90}	—	March 11, 2008	Mount Lemmon	Mount Lemmon Survey	·	3.0 km	MPC · JPL
727955	2010 KF_{91}	—	May 27, 2010	WISE	WISE	·	1.6 km	MPC · JPL
727956	2010 KO_{91}	—	May 27, 2010	WISE	WISE	·	2.3 km	MPC · JPL
727957	2010 KQ_{91}	—	September 28, 2003	Kitt Peak	Spacewatch	·	1.7 km	MPC · JPL
727958	2010 KT_{91}	—	May 23, 2001	Haleakala	NEAT	·	2.2 km	MPC · JPL
727959	2010 KV_{91}	—	May 27, 2010	WISE	WISE	·	2.1 km	MPC · JPL
727960	2010 KW_{91}	—	May 2, 2003	Kitt Peak	Spacewatch	·	3.2 km	MPC · JPL
727961	2010 KC_{92}	—	February 20, 2014	Haleakala	Pan-STARRS 1	·	3.4 km	MPC · JPL
727962	2010 KD_{92}	—	May 27, 2010	WISE	WISE	URS	3.5 km	MPC · JPL
727963	2010 KR_{92}	—	May 27, 2010	WISE	WISE	·	2.5 km	MPC · JPL
727964	2010 KS_{92}	—	May 27, 2010	WISE	WISE	·	2.8 km	MPC · JPL
727965	2010 KX_{92}	—	May 27, 2010	WISE	WISE	·	910 m	MPC · JPL
727966	2010 KO_{93}	—	May 27, 2010	WISE	WISE	·	4.1 km	MPC · JPL
727967	2010 KJ_{94}	—	March 26, 2008	Mount Lemmon	Mount Lemmon Survey	·	3.0 km	MPC · JPL
727968	2010 KK_{94}	—	May 27, 2010	WISE	WISE	·	4.6 km	MPC · JPL
727969	2010 KN_{95}	—	May 27, 2010	WISE	WISE	NAE	3.7 km	MPC · JPL
727970	2010 KD_{96}	—	March 12, 2010	Catalina	CSS	NEM	2.4 km	MPC · JPL
727971	2010 KM_{96}	—	May 28, 2010	WISE	WISE	·	2.3 km	MPC · JPL
727972	2010 KA_{97}	—	October 2, 2003	Kitt Peak	Spacewatch	HOF	2.6 km	MPC · JPL
727973	2010 KR_{97}	—	February 6, 2002	Kitt Peak	Deep Ecliptic Survey	·	3.9 km	MPC · JPL
727974	2010 KB_{98}	—	May 28, 2010	WISE	WISE	·	2.8 km	MPC · JPL
727975	2010 KO_{98}	—	May 28, 2010	WISE	WISE	·	2.8 km	MPC · JPL
727976	2010 KS_{98}	—	February 10, 2010	Kitt Peak	Spacewatch	EMA	2.3 km	MPC · JPL
727977	2010 KF_{100}	—	May 28, 2010	WISE	WISE	·	4.0 km	MPC · JPL
727978	2010 KX_{100}	—	March 24, 2009	Mount Lemmon	Mount Lemmon Survey	·	2.4 km	MPC · JPL
727979	2010 KN_{101}	—	May 28, 2010	WISE	WISE	·	2.3 km	MPC · JPL
727980	2010 KV_{101}	—	May 28, 2010	WISE	WISE	·	5.5 km	MPC · JPL
727981	2010 KY_{101}	—	May 28, 2010	WISE	WISE	·	4.5 km	MPC · JPL
727982	2010 KP_{102}	—	February 17, 2010	Catalina	CSS	·	2.5 km	MPC · JPL
727983	2010 KT_{102}	—	May 28, 2010	WISE	WISE	PHO	1.0 km	MPC · JPL
727984	2010 KE_{103}	—	December 19, 2007	Mount Lemmon	Mount Lemmon Survey	·	2.9 km	MPC · JPL
727985	2010 KT_{103}	—	May 29, 2010	WISE	WISE	VER	2.3 km	MPC · JPL
727986	2010 KV_{103}	—	May 29, 2010	WISE	WISE	·	2.4 km	MPC · JPL
727987	2010 KA_{104}	—	May 29, 2010	WISE	WISE	·	1.9 km	MPC · JPL
727988	2010 KH_{104}	—	May 29, 2010	WISE	WISE	·	3.4 km	MPC · JPL
727989	2010 KK_{104}	—	May 29, 2010	WISE	WISE	·	2.7 km	MPC · JPL
727990	2010 KQ_{105}	—	May 29, 2010	WISE	WISE	·	1.4 km	MPC · JPL
727991	2010 KH_{106}	—	February 1, 2005	Kitt Peak	Spacewatch	·	2.8 km	MPC · JPL
727992	2010 KT_{106}	—	December 31, 2008	Mount Lemmon	Mount Lemmon Survey	·	1.9 km	MPC · JPL
727993	2010 KN_{107}	—	May 29, 2010	WISE	WISE	PHO	910 m	MPC · JPL
727994	2010 KV_{107}	—	May 29, 2010	WISE	WISE	ERI	1.7 km	MPC · JPL
727995	2010 KX_{107}	—	February 18, 2010	Kitt Peak	Spacewatch	·	2.1 km	MPC · JPL
727996	2010 KD_{108}	—	August 13, 1993	Kitt Peak	Spacewatch	LIX	3.9 km	MPC · JPL
727997	2010 KK_{108}	—	May 29, 2010	WISE	WISE	·	2.8 km	MPC · JPL
727998	2010 KP_{108}	—	May 29, 2010	WISE	WISE	NAE	2.9 km	MPC · JPL
727999	2010 KQ_{108}	—	May 29, 2010	WISE	WISE	·	1.3 km	MPC · JPL
728000	2010 KO_{110}	—	May 29, 2010	WISE	WISE	EMA	2.8 km	MPC · JPL

back to top

== Meaning of names ==
As minor planet discoveries are confirmed, they are given a permanent number by the IAU's Minor Planet Center (MPC), and the discoverers can then submit names for them, following the IAU's naming conventions. The list below concerns those minor planets in the specified number-range that have received names, and explains the meanings of those names.

Official naming citations of newly named small Solar System bodies are approved and published in a bulletin by IAU's Working Group for Small Bodies Nomenclature (WGSBN). Before May 2021, citations were published in MPC's Minor Planet Circulars for many decades. Recent citations can also be found on the JPL Small-Body Database (SBDB). Until his death in 2016, German astronomer Lutz D. Schmadel compiled these citations into the Dictionary of Minor Planet Names (DMP) and regularly updated the collection.

Based on Paul Herget's The Names of the Minor Planets, Schmadel also researched the unclear origin of numerous asteroids, most of which had been named prior to World War II. This article incorporates text from this source, which is in the public domain: SBDB New namings may only be added to this list below after official publication as the preannouncement of names is condemned. The WGSBN publishes a comprehensive guideline for the naming rules of non-cometary small Solar System bodies.

Named minor planet	Provisional	This minor planet was named for...	Ref · Catalog
727524 Pierrepaquette	2010 HF_{54}	Pierre Paquette, Canadian graphic designer and amateur astronomer.	IAU · 727524
727736 Fus	2010 JF_{106}	Cătălin Fus, Romanian amateur astronomer.	IAU · 727736
