= BBC in Concert 1972–1973 =

BBC in Concert 1972-1973

Live album by Badfinger
- Released: 1997 (original release); 11 January 2000 (reissue)
- Recorded: 1972–73
- Genre: Power pop
- Label: Strange Fruit
- Producer: Jeff Griffin

Badfinger chronology
Day After Day: Live (1990)	BBC in Concert 1972-1973 (1997)	Head First (2000)

Professional ratings
Review scores
Source	Rating
Allmusic	3/5 stars

BBC in Concert 1972–1973 is a CD of live recordings by the Welsh rock group Badfinger released in 1997 by Strange Fruit Records and then re-released in 2000 by Fuel 2000 Records. The recordings were made for the BBC in 1972 and 1973, in two separate concerts at the Paris Theatre in London. The album also includes a 1970 BBC recording of Badfinger's first Top 10 hit, "Come and Get It".

== History ==
Badfinger recorded two seven-song shows approximately 14 months apart, the first on 8 June 1972 and the second on 10 August 1973, for broadcast on the BBC.

Although these concerts were recorded at the height of Badfinger's fame, they do not feature any of the band's hits from this time such as "No Matter What", "Day After Day", "Without You" or "Baby Blue". Instead, the first concert includes covers of two Dave Mason songs, plus two songs from No Dice and three songs from Straight Up. The second concert also features songs from each of these albums plus others from Ass and Badfinger. The Joey Molland song "Suitcase" from Straight Up is played in both concerts.

The songs illustrate Badfinger's rock side, which was never really captured on any of the band's studio albums. Molland and Pete Ham dominate the recordings on lead guitars.

The last track on the CD is a live recording of the hit "Come and Get It", recorded by Badfinger in 1970 for the BBC show "Top of the Pops".

== Track listing ==
1. "Better Days" (Evans/Molland) – 3:54
2. "Only You Know and I Know" (Mason) – 6:16
3. "We're for the Dark" (Ham) – 4:55
4. "Sweet Tuesday Morning" (Molland) – 2:48
5. "Feelin' Alright" (Mason) – 9:11
6. "Take It All" (Ham) – 4:18
7. "Suitcase" (Molland) – 7:35
8. "Love Is Easy" (Molland) – 3:12
9. "Blind Owl" (Evans) – 4:40
10. "Constitution" (Molland) – 4:05
11. "Icicles" (Molland) – 2:34
12. "Matted Spam" (Ham) – 3:45
13. "Suitcase" (Molland) – 6:18
14. "I Can't Take It" (Ham) – 4:31
15. "Come and Get It" (McCartney) – 2:35

== Personnel ==
- Pete Ham: guitars, piano, vocals
- Tom Evans: bass, vocals
- Joey Molland: guitars, vocals
- Mike Gibbins: drums, vocals
