= Day After Day: Live =

Live album by Badfinger
- Released: 24 September 1990
- Recorded: 4 March 1974
- Venue: Agora, Cleveland
- Genre: Power pop
- Length: 48:32
- Label: Rykodisc
- Producer: Joey Molland; Mark Healy

Badfinger chronology
Say No More (1981)	Day After Day: Live (1990)	BBC in Concert 1972–1973 (1997)

Professional ratings
Review scores
Source	Rating
Allmusic	2.5/5 stars

Day After Day: Live is a CD release by Rykodisc in 1990 of live recordings made by the Welsh rock group Badfinger in 1974.

During a concert tour in the Midwestern United States in 1974, Badfinger learned that the Agora venue in Cleveland, Ohio, contained a 16-track setup capable of live recordings. The group had released five studio albums up to this point but had not made any professional live recordings. Deciding to use the equipment, Badfinger recorded two of their shows at the Agora. Due to audio distortion and essentially a moderate performance by the group, the tapes were not used at the time.

The Agora recordings circulated as bootlegs for several years before band member Joey Molland brought them to the attention of Rykodisc in 1989. Molland performed a great deal of rework to the recordings, including overdubbing his vocals, several guitars, and some of the bass. He also used a computer-sampled drum snare to enhance the original drum track. Molland also rearranged the song order of the performances, placing Pete Ham's compositions at the end of the CD. As a result of Molland's augmentation, the CD has been bitterly reviewed by music critics and fans.

Complications arose for Molland in the mid 1990s when other Badfinger parties objected to the release, citing they were not properly notified. There was also some confusion as to the ownership of the original tapes, which Molland testified were taken by his wife when he resigned from the group in 1974. A lawsuit in Great Britain resolved that Molland should have proceeded differently when releasing the CD, but generally ruled in his favour regarding royalty divisions (which included Molland's compensation for production work).

== Track listing ==
1. "Sometimes" (Molland) – 2:59
2. "I Don't Mind" (Molland, Evans) – 3:13
3. "Blind Owl" (Evans) – 5:40
4. "Give It Up" (Molland) – 7:22
5. "Constitution" (Molland) – 4:13
6. "Baby Blue" (Ham) – 3:49
7. "Name of the Game" (Ham) – 5:17
8. "Day After Day" (Ham) – 3:04
9. "Timeless" (Ham) – 7:56
10. "I Can't Take It" (Ham) – 4:58

== Personnel ==
=== Badfinger ===
- Pete Ham – Guitar, Vocals, Piano
- Tom Evans – Bass, Vocals
- Mike Gibbins – Drums
- Joey Molland – Guitar, Vocals

=== Production ===
- Joey Molland – Producer, Liner Notes
- Mark Healy – Producer, Engineer
- Scott Bartel – Engineer, Second Engineer
- Dr. Toby Mountain – Digital Mastering, Mastering
