= Apple of My Eye =

Apple of my eye is a phrase that refers in English to something or someone that one cherishes above all others.

Apple of My Eye may also refer to:

- "Apple of My Eye" (Rick Ross song), a song in the album Rather You Than Me by American rapper Rick Ross
- "Apple of My Eye" (song), a song recorded by the rock/pop band Badfinger for inclusion
- Apple of My Eye, a 2023 South Korean television drama starring Seo Jun-young, Kim Si-hoo and Kang Da-hyun
