= Name of the Game (Badfinger song) =

- An acetate of the song

Song by Badfinger

from the album Straight Up
- Released: 13 December 1971 (US); 11 February 1972 (UK)
- Genre: Power pop
- Length: 5:19
- Label: Apple Records
- Songwriter(s): Pete Ham
- Producer(s): Todd Rundgren; George Harrison

"Name of the Game" is the sixth track from power pop band Badfinger's 1971 album, Straight Up. The song was written by Pete Ham.

== Background ==
After the release of their album No Dice, Badfinger began work on an untitled follow-up. Geoff Emerick produced sessions for the songs that were to be on the album, among them being "Name of the Game". "Name of the Game" was also intended to be released as the lead single from this album, backed with "Suitcase", a track written by Joey Molland, but, despite efforts from George Harrison (who was impressed greatly by the track) to remix the song, the single, as well as the rest of the album, were canceled due to input from Phil Spector. This single edit appeared on some reissues of Straight Up.

When George Harrison returned to produce a new album for Badfinger, one of the songs that he worked on was "Name of the Game". However, upon his departure due to The Concert for Bangladesh, Todd Rundgren came to finish the album. Upon its completion, the album, now titled Straight Up, featured "Name of the Game" at the end of side one.

"Name of the Game" also appeared as the A-side of a single in the Philippines (backed with "Perfection".)

== Reception ==
"Name of the Game" has generally received positive reviews from critics. AllMusic's Stephen Thomas Erlewine called "Name of the Game" a "note-perfect pop ballad," while Apple Records' overview of Straight Up said that "Name of the Game" was "epic both in sound and in sentiment." Chris Evans chose it as an example of a Badfinger that shows that "though lyrical profundity may have been beyond them, there was plenty of mileage to be got out of the power ballad before Adrian Gurvitz and Michael Bolton came along.

Classic Rock critic Rob Hughes rated "Name of the Game" as Badfinger's 8th greatest song, saying "Pete Ham’s piano-led meditation is a prime example of his consummate artistry, replete with purring harmonies and a comely melody." Classic Rock History critic Janey Roberts rated it as Badfinger's 10th best song, calling it "a great Badfinger song written by Mr. Peter Hamm" despite being overshadowed by the singles released from the album. Goldmine critic Bill Kopp included "Name of the Game" as one of "5 wrongfully overlooked Badfinger songs."

"Name of the Game" was also a favorite of the members of Badfinger. Guitarist Joey Molland said that "We [members of Badfinger] were all knocked out by that.”
