= Apple of My Eye (song) =

Single by Badfinger

from the album Ass
- B-side: "Blind Owl"
- Released: 17 December 1973
- Recorded: 3 January 1973
- Studio: Trident Studios, London
- Genre: Power pop
- Length: 3:03
- Label: Apple
- Songwriter: Pete Ham
- Producers: Chris Thomas, Badfinger

Badfinger UK singles chronology
"Baby Blue" (1972)	"Apple of My Eye" (1973)	"Love Is Easy" (1974)

Badfinger US singles chronology
"Baby Blue" (1972)	"Apple of My Eye" (1973)	"I Miss You" (1974)

"Apple of My Eye" is a song recorded by the Welsh rock band Badfinger for inclusion on their 1973 album, Ass. The song was written and sung by Pete Ham, produced by Chris Thomas and Badfinger, and released on Apple Records.

== Writing ==
Ham wrote the song about his mixed feelings upon the band's leaving Apple Records (which was the "apple of my eye" to Ham) to pursue a larger contract by moving to Warner Bros. Records. The same concern is reflected on the Ass album cover, which shows a donkey following a carrot into the distance. Coincidentally, disregarding those performed by an ex-Beatle, it was the last single (Apple 49) released by Apple before its collapse.

== Problems and release ==
Due to Apple's financial chaos and its problems with the group, no new picture sleeve was created for the single, although some countries (such as the Netherlands, shown here) used a variant of the "Day After Day" sleeve. It would become the original group's last single to chart in the US, although it missed making the Billboard Hot 100, peaking at number 102 on the "Bubbling Under Hot 100 Singles" chart. It reached number 11 in South Africa.

In most countries, Tom Evans' "Blind Owl" was released as the B-side. However, in Japan, "Apple of My Eye" was backed with Mike Gibbins' song "Cowboy", and in the Philippines, Evans' "When I Say" was the B-side.

== Reception ==
Classic Rock History critic Janey Roberts also rated it as Badfinger's 5th best song, calling it "a beautiful song that signified the end of an era for Badfinger and their relationship with the Beatles Apple Records." Ultimate Classic Rock critic Michael Gallucci rated it as Badfinger's 6th best song. Classic Rock critic Rob Hughes rated it as Badfinger's 10th best song, calling it "a poignant farewell."

== Personnel ==
- Pete Ham – vocals, acoustic guitar, keyboards
- Tom Evans – bass guitar
- Joey Molland – electric guitar
- Mike Gibbins – drums, percussion
