= Head First (Badfinger album) =

Studio album by Badfinger
- Released: 14 November 2000 (Snapper Records); 13 December 2024 (Y&T Music)
- Recorded: 1–7, 9–15 December 1974
- Studios: Apple Studios, London
- Genres: Rock; power pop
- Length: 35:23
- Labels: Warner Bros. Records; Snapper Records; Y&T Music
- Producers: Kenny Kerner; Richie Wise

Badfinger chronology
BBC in Concert 1972–1973 (1997)	Head First (2000)

Professional ratings
Review scores
Source	Rating
AllMusic	4/5 stars
Uncut	3/10 stars

Head First is the tenth and final studio album by the Welsh rock band Badfinger, released on 14 November 2000. It was recorded over 25 years earlier at the Beatles' Apple Studios in London, but was not released at the time. Originally intended to be Badfinger's third LP under its six-album contract with Warner Bros. Records, the recordings were shelved when legal difficulties erupted between the band and the label.

The version that was finally released in 2000 was a rough mix of the album made in December 1974 by Phil McDonald, one of the recording engineers at Apple Studios. Head First was released again on 13 December 2024, featuring a remix from the rediscovered master tapes by surviving member Bob Jackson and musician Andy Nixon.

== History ==
After the recording of Badfinger's previous album, Wish You Were Here, founding member Pete Ham decided to quit Badfinger. To replace him, the band added keyboardist/guitarist Bob Jackson and started rehearsals for a U.K. tour supporting the Welsh band Man. During rehearsals, Ham decided to rejoin the group after advice from Warner Brothers. The tour ended up as a quintet, during which long-time member Joey Molland decided to quit the group after the tour ended. Following the tour, Badfinger was told by its management to go back in the studio to record another new album. Their American manager Stan Polley hired producers Kenny Kerner and Richie Wise, who had just become successful by producing Kiss.

The remaining members of Badfinger recorded Head First in just two weeks. Rough mixes were made at Apple Studios by engineer Phil McDonald the day after sessions ended on 16 December 1974, and further remixes were made in Los Angeles by producers Kerner and Wise between 19–24 January 1975, in an effort to get the album released as soon as possible. A photo session took place in February 1975 and artist Peter Corriston sketched a picture of a lion for the potential album cover design.

The difficult circumstances that surrounded Badfinger at this time contribute to the album's tone and provide the theme for at least two of its songs. In particular, an investigation by WB's publishing division discovered that approximately $100,000 was missing from a Badfinger escrow account related to music publishing. Inquiries made by WB as to the whereabouts of the money were reportedly met with silence by Polley, arousing suspicions within WB. Angered by what it claimed to be a lack of cooperation, WB launched a "breach of contract" suit against Polley and Badfinger virtually simultaneously with the Head First recording sessions, which also sought to attach the royalties due from Wish You Were Here. Consequently, WB suspended sales of Wish You Were Here.

Although the master tapes of Head First were delivered to and accepted by WB's A & R division in Los Angeles, WB's publishing arm there refused to accept and publish the songs because of the lawsuit. With a lack of publishing protection, the A & R division shelved the tapes and the album was not released.

Unaware of the lawsuit at the time, the group had nevertheless argued amongst themselves regarding Polley's honesty and his handling of their money, factors which had contributed to Molland's departure. These sentiments came to the surface in the lyrics for at least two Head First tracks, "Rock and Roll Contract" and "Hey, Mr. Manager", which are indictments of Polley by bassist Tom Evans.

Badfinger became aware of the lawsuit in early 1975, simultaneous to a discontinuation of the group's salary checks from Polley. As financial turmoil mounted for the band members and its future became more uncertain, group leader Pete Ham committed suicide on 24 April 1975, only four months after the album was completed. Because of continuing financial difficulties related to Polley, which led Apple Records to also suspend the group's royalty payments and pull the group's albums from distribution, Evans later took his own life on 19 November 1983.

It appeared for many years that Head First would never be released, as the litigation between WB and Stan Polley remained unresolved, the master tapes had been misplaced, and the audio quality of known copies was so poor as to be unusable. However, four remixed songs from January 1975 for Head First — "Lay Me Down", "Passed Fast", "Keep Believing", and "Moonshine" — turned up on the original Rhino Records CD Best of Badfinger Vol. 2 (featuring Badfinger songs recorded for WB and Elektra after the band's departure from Apple Records), which was released in 1990. These songs were eventually removed from the digital version after the unresolved litigation was brought to Rhino's attention.

Head First was finally released on CD in 2000 on Snapper Records, using the rough mix of the recordings that was prepared by Phil McDonald at the end of the recording sessions in December 1974, which was rediscovered in the late 1990s. This was the last Badfinger studio album to include Pete Ham and Mike Gibbins, and the only one to feature Bob Jackson as a group member.

In 2024, after years of inquiries, the original multi-track masters were found by WB and digitised. Jackson (the sole surviving member of this lineup), with musician Andy Nixon, reconstructed the entire album from scratch for a brand-new release just in time for the 50th anniversary of the album's recording sessions in December 1974. The new remixes were released in December 2024 by Y&T Music on both vinyl and CD, with booklets including song lyrics and original memorabilia related to the album’s recording sessions. In July 2025 the album was released digitally on the Badfinger Spotify account.

== Track listings ==
Original track listing

This was the track listing as listed on the original Apple Studio stereo mix tapes from 16 December 1974:

Side One

1. "Lay Me Down" – 3:35
2. "Turn Around" – 4:21
3. "Keep Believing" – 4:08
4. "Rockin' Machine" – 1:27
5. "Passed Fast" – 4:18

Side Two

1. "Savile Row" – 1:00
2. "Moonshine" – 3:55
3. "Rock and Roll Contract" – 4:39
4. "Back Again" – 2:55
5. "Mr. Manager" – 3:32

2000 Snapper edition

The original track listing was not used on the Snapper release. These are the 16 December 1974 mixes. "Savile Row" was edited by Dan Matovina. The songs on the second CD are demo bonus tracks.

CD 1

1. "Lay Me Down" (Ham) – 3:35
2. "Hey, Mr. Manager" (Evans) – 3:34
3. "Keep Believing" (Ham) – 4:09
4. "Passed Fast" (Evans/Jackson) – 4:19
5. "Rock 'N' Roll Contract" (Evans) – 4:44
6. "Savile Row" (Ham) - 0:36
7. "Moonshine" (Gibbins/Jackson/Evans) – 3:53
8. "Back Again" (Gibbins) – 2:54
9. "Turn Around" (Jackson) – 4:17
10. "Rockin' Machine" (Gibbins) – 1:32

CD 2

1. "Time Is Mine" (Ham) – 1:45
2. "Smokin' Gun" (Ham) – 1:22
3. "Old Fashioned Notions" (Gibbins) – 4:12
4. "Nothing to Show" (Ham) – 1:03
5. "You Ask Yourself Why" (Gibbins) – 2:17
6. "Keep Your Country Tidy" (Ham) – 2:23
7. "To Say Goodbye" (Jackson) – 3:46
8. "Queen of Darkness" (Evans) – 2:13
9. "I Can't Believe In" (Ham) – 2:10
10. "Thanks to You All" (Gibbins) – 2:41
11. "Lay Me Down" (Ham) – 2:55

2024 remix (Y&T Music, YT-35 vinyl)

This is the first officially released remix endorsed by the estates of Ham, Evans, Gibbins and surviving member, Bob Jackson:

Side One

1. "Lay Me Down" (Pete Ham) - 3:46
2. "Hey Mr. Manager" (Tom Evans) - 3:35
3. “Turn Around” (Bob Jackson) - 4:21
4. "Back Again" (Mike Gibbins) - 2:52
5. "Rock ’N’ Roll Contract" (Tom Evans) - 4:48

Side Two

1. "Keep Believing" (Pete Ham) - 4:12
2. "Moonshine" (Tom Evans, Bob Jackson, Mike Gibbins) - 3:51
3. "Rockin’ Machine" (Mike Gibbins) - 1:35
4. "Passed Fast" (Tom Evans, Bob Jackson) - 4:17
5. "Savile Row (2024)" (Pete Ham, Badfinger) - 1:50

2024 remix (Y&T Music, YT-35 CD)

1. "Lay Me Down" (Pete Ham) - 3:46
2. "Hey Mr. Manager" (Tom Evans) - 3:35
3. “Turn Around” (Bob Jackson) - 4:21
4. "Back Again" (Mike Gibbins) - 2:52
5. "Rock ’N’ Roll Contract" (Tom Evans) - 4:48
6. "Keep Believing" (Pete Ham) - 4:12
7. "Moonshine" (Tom Evans, Bob Jackson, Mike Gibbins) - 3:51
8. "Rockin’ Machine" (Mike Gibbins) - 1:35
9. "Passed Fast" (Tom Evans, Bob Jackson) - 4:17
10. "Savile Row (2024)" (Pete Ham, Badfinger) - 1:50

== Personnel ==
- Pete Ham - guitar, electric piano, harmonica, vocals
- Tom Evans - bass, vocals
- Bob Jackson - keyboards, vocals
- Mike Gibbins - drums, percussion, guitar, vocals

== Bibliography ==
- Dan Matovina, Without You: The Tragic Story of Badfinger, 2nd ed., illustrated, revised, Frances Glover Books, 2000, ISBN 0-9657122-2-2 ISBN 9780965712224
- Head First (CD & LP) booklet, Y&T Music (YT-35), 2024
