= No Matter What (Badfinger song) =

1970 single by Badfinger

- Cover of the 1970 UK single

Single by Badfinger

from the album No Dice
- B-side: "Better Days"(UK); "Carry on Till Tomorrow" (US)
- Released: 12 October 1970
- Recorded: 13 May 1970
- Studio: EMI, London
- Genre: Power pop; pop rock
- Length: 2:57
- Label: Apple
- Songwriter: Pete Ham
- Producer: Mal Evans

Badfinger singles chronology
"Come and Get It" (1969)	"No Matter What" (1970)	"Day After Day" (1971)

Official audio
- "No Matter What" (remastered 2010) on YouTube

"No Matter What" is a song originally recorded by British rock band Badfinger for their album No Dice in 1970, written and sung by Pete Ham and produced by Mal Evans.

== Recording ==
As a demo, "No Matter What" was originally recorded at a slower tempo by Ham on acoustic guitar (as heard on the posthumous Ham solo CD 7 Park Avenue). A group demo version, played at the same tempo as Ham's acoustic demo, was recorded by Badfinger on 18 April 1970 with Mal Evans producing. The song was recorded again in a rockier fashion, at a faster tempo, by the band in May 1970 at EMI Studios, and it was this version that appeared on the album and single.

Guitarist Joey Molland explained the development of the song, particularly the slide guitar solo at the conclusion:

We just kind of arranged it in studio. Pete [Ham] had the song, and it was a good one. We just worked it out in a studio. Mal Evans was the producer and Geoff Emerick engineered. I think we took about an hour or two hours to do the record. We worked out those little guitar lines, and then the harmonies. I originally had a different guitar solo, one that kind of slurred the strings. But we were at Abbey Road mixing the song, and there was a lap steel. I got that out and started playing along with the backing track. Everybody said: "Why don’t we put that on there?" That’s how it became a slide guitar solo.

Although the song and recording was a favourite of Badfinger's shortly after it was completed, the hierarchy at Apple Records reportedly was not inclined to release it in any format. It was not until Al Steckler, the American director of Apple in New York, heard the tape in August 1970 and considered it a strong entry by the band, that it was remixed by engineer/producer Geoff Emerick and slotted for the upcoming LP and as a single release.

== Lyrics and music ==
According to AllMusic critic Ritchie Unterberger, the lyrics of "No Matter What" are essentially "a pledge of eternal love." Unterberger says that these lyrics are "sung with great infectious lilting cheer, pioneering the 'power pop' style years before that was named by critics." Unterberger noted that the opening guitar chords are "not exactly hard rock and certainly not heavy metal, but dense and gripping." He also pointed out that similar to many Beatles songs, "the melody goes through a few different chord changes on the final line of the bridge than it does in the first half of the bridge, though retaining a similar progression."

The song has a false ending, after the final chorus, where, after a short pause, the last line is repeated twice before the final ending chord.

== Release ==
The single was released in the United States (12 October 1970), Canada, the Philippines and a few other countries, with the Tom Evans-Pete Ham song "Carry On Till Tomorrow" (the theme song for the movie The Magic Christian) as the B-side. This was an edited version of the recording that had appeared on Badfinger's previous album, Magic Christian Music. In all other countries, the single was backed with the Tom Evans-Joey Molland song "Better Days", which also appeared on No Dice.

== Reception ==
It was the band's first UK Top 10 single to be composed by Badfinger, reaching number 5 in the UK in January 1971. In the US it peaked at number 8 on the Billboard Hot 100. In South Africa it topped the charts. The band also scored with "Come and Get It", number 4 in the UK in January 1970, which was composed by Paul McCartney, and "Day After Day", number 10 in the UK in January 1972.

Cash Box described the song as sounding "as though it might have come from a '65 Beatles LP" with "bright vocals and strong instrumentals." Record World said that "millions are going to love Badfinger's new single. The boys have a certain vocal sound that sets them apart."

AllMusic critic Ritchie Unterberger said that "No Matter What" "boasted a strong McCartney-esque melody and very Beatlesque vocal harmony and guitars but felt that "derivative of McCartney it might have been, yet 'No Matter What' rocked a darn sight better than most of the songs McCartney himself put out in the early '70s."

Ultimate Classic Rock critic Michael Gallucci rated it as Badfinger's 3rd best song, saying that it "features one of pop's all-time mightiest hooks" and that "from the terrific opening riff to the false ending, it's pure pop heaven." Classic Rock critic Rob Hughes rated it as Badfinger's 4th best song, calling it "a declaration of loyalty and affection with a Beatlesy middle eight and the kind of hook that became synonymous with the soulful power pop of Big Star and The Raspberries." Hughes also praised Molland's guitar solo. Classic Rock History critic Janey Roberts also rated it as Badfinger's 4th best song.

The song is notable for being one of the first successful records associated with the power pop sound, using all of the elements attributed to the genre. A subsequent single released by Badfinger, "Baby Blue" (Billboard number 14, 1972), along with several album tracks in a similar vein, succeeded in categorizing the band themselves as power pop. This song is ranked number 1 on VH1's "20 Essential Power Pop Tracks That Will Be Stuck In Your Head Forever".

== Personnel ==
- Pete Ham – lead vocals, rhythm guitar
- Joey Molland – lead guitar, rhythm guitar, lap steel guitar, backing vocals
- Tom Evans – bass, backing vocals
- Mike Gibbins – drums

== Chart performance ==
=== Weekly charts ===
Chart (1970–1971)	Peak position
Argentina	17
Australia (Go-Set)	8
Belgium (Ultratop 50 Flanders)	13
Canada Top Singles (RPM)	7
Ireland (IRMA)	7
Netherlands (Single Top 100)	24
New Zealand (Listener)	5
South Africa (Springbok Radio)	1
UK Singles (Official Charts)	5
US Billboard Hot 100	8
West Germany (GfK)	32

=== Year-end charts ===
Chart (1970)	Position
Canada	98

Chart (1971)	Position
Australia	73
South Africa	12
UK	46

== Def Leppard version ==
"No Matter What"
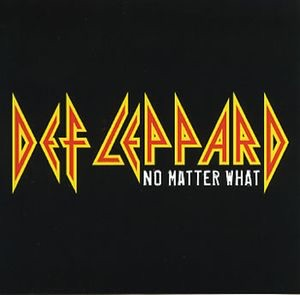

Single by Def Leppard

from the album Yeah!
- Released: 16 May 2005
- Genre: Hard rock
- Length: 2:58
- Label: Mercury
- Songwriter: Pete Ham
- Producers: Def Leppard; Ronan McHugh

Def Leppard singles chronology
"Long, Long Way to Go" (2003)	"No Matter What" (2005)	"Rock On" (2006)

Official audio
- "No Matter What" on YouTube

English rock band Def Leppard covered "No Matter What" in 2005, recorded at Joe's Garage, Dublin and distributed by UML (Universal Music Group). It was included on their 2005 compilation album Rock of Ages: The Definitive Collection and also on its 2006 album, Yeah!.

Def Leppard began playing the song on their 2005 tour in support of their compilation album Rock of Ages: The Definitive Collection along with a cover of David Essex's "Rock On" which appeared on the album.

It reached the 24 place in the US Billboard Adult Top 40 Chart.

=== Personnel ===
- Joe Elliot – lead vocals
- Phil Collen – lead guitar
- Vivian Campbell – rhythm guitar
- Rick Savage – bass
- Rick Allen – drums
- Ronan McHugh – engineer, producer
