= We're for the Dark =

1970 Badfinger song

Song by Badfinger

from the album No Dice
- Released: 9 November 1970
- Recorded: 27 June, 3 July 1970
- Studio: EMI, London
- Length: 3:55
- Label: Apple
- Songwriter: Pete Ham
- Producer: Geoff Emerick

"We're for the Dark" is a song written by Pete Ham that was released as the closing track on Badfinger's 1970 album No Dice. It was covered by Loud Family.

== Music and lyrics ==
The title of "We're for the Dark" comes from a line in Shakespeare's play Antony and Cleopatra. Idaho Statesman critic Tim Woodward described "We're for the Dark" as "a sort of jazz-type rock with a good blend of acoustic and electric guitar work." The instrumentation is based around Ham's acoustic guitar, and Ham also sings the lead vocal. Badfinger biographer Dan Matovina described it as a "breezy acoustic song" that "just soars with imaginative chorus breaks and an intricate chord structure." Allmusic critic Stewart Mason commented on how the "stripped-down arrangement", "Ham's plaintive voice" and "closely-miked acoustic guitar" produced an "intimacy" that Badfinger rarely achieved. Badfinger biographer Robert Day-Webb described the song as starting with a "graceful folk-pop foundation" that then has orchestration with string instruments and then horns layered over it in the middle of the song. The song then fades to a calm ending. Harry Robinson provided the orchestral arrangement, which producer Geoff Emerick loved.

Mason described the lyrics as being "impressionistic" and felt that this allowed the song to avoid sounding "uncomfortably mawkish."

== Reception ==
Mason called "We're for the Dark" "one of Pete Ham's finest ballads." Webb said that "Boasting a sweet and engaging melody, this tune successfully evokes a great sense of romanticism", and particularly praised how "the orchestration [adds] a richness and fullness to the acoustic base without ever overpowering it." In the first edition of the All Music Guide to Rock, Rick Clark called it "beautifully romantic" and one of the highlights of No Dice. Expositor critic John Mars called it a "fantastic, catchy tune." Goldmine critic Bill Kopp included "We're for the Dark" as one of "5 wrongfully overlooked Badfinger songs", saying that "This sweeping, dramatic ballad features one of songwriter Pete Ham's strongest vocal performances."

"We're for the Dark" was included on the 2000 compilation album The Very Best of Badfinger.

== Live ==
Badfinger frequently played "We're for the Dark" live in concert. This provided Ham with an opportunity to be the focus of an acoustic song during a show. A live version was included on the live album BBC in Concert 1972–1973.

== Cover version ==
The Loud Family covered "We're for the Dark" on Come and Get It - A Tribute to Badfinger in 1996. Austin American-Statesman critic Don McLeese called it a highlight of the tribute album and said that the "Ham obscurity [is] given tremulous testament by Scott Miller." Mason called it a "fine, sensitive reading."
