= Richard DiLello =

American photographer and author (born 1945)

Richard DiLello (born 1945) is an American photographer, author, and screenwriter.

== Career ==
Serving as the "house hippie" (formally termed Client Liaison Officer) at Apple Corps, DiLello's duties included promotional campaigns for The Beatles, Badfinger and other artists who were signed to Apple Records, he later published a memoir of his experiences working at Apple titled The Longest Cocktail Party.

DiLello also became a screenwriter, and went on to write the screenplay for the 1983 Sean Penn film Bad Boys; the 1988 film Colors, as well as writing for television shows such as Midnight Caller, DEA, and Dellaventura.

== Works ==
=== As Photographer ===
- Janis Joplin - I Got Dem Ol' Kozmic Blues Again Mama! (1969)
- John Lennon & Yoko Ono - Wedding Album (1970) (1997 remaster)
- Badfinger - No Dice (1970)
- George Harrison - All Things Must Pass (1970) (50th Anniversary Edition)
- John Tavener - The Whale (1970)
- Badfinger - Straight Up (1971)
- Ian McDonald and Michael Giles - McDonald and Giles (1970)
- The Raspberries - Starting Over (1974)
- Barbara Acklin - A Place in the Sun (1975)
- Black Sheep - Black Sheep (1975)
- Black Sheep - Encouraging Words (1975)
- The Reflections - Love on Delivery (1975)
- Roger Moon - Second Class View of Paradise (1975)
- Bux - We Came to Play (1976)
- Charlie - No Second Chance (1977)

=== Film ===
Year	Title	Writer	Producer
1983	Bad Boys	Yes	No
1988	Colors	Yes	No

=== Television ===
Year	Title	Writer	Producer	Director	Notes
1986	Popeye Doyle	Yes	Yes	No	Television Film
1988-91	Midnight Caller	Yes	Yes	No	Creator
1990	The Brotherhood	Yes	Co-Executive	No	Television Film
1990-91	DEA	Yes	Executive	No	Creator
1997	Riot	Yes	No	Yes	Television Film
1997-98	Dellaventura	Yes	Executive	No	Co-Creator

=== Unmade film/television projects ===
- Aspen, a prime time soap set in the resort town of the same name
- Dark Matter
- Dark Moon Rising
- Escape
- The Michael Concepcion Story aka The Original Gangster, a project about the creation, growth, and rise to power of South-Central L.A.’s Crips gang that would have been directed by Renny Harlin
- Murder in Cold, Blue Blood, an adaptation of a Dominick Dunne article about a blue-blood murder in a cheap Las Vegas hotel
- Never Fade Away: The Kurt Cobain Story, an adaptation of the Dave Thompson book about the life and times of Nirvana frontman Kurt Cobain
- Vegas Metro, a Las Vegas-based action drama
