= Ass (album) =

1973 studio album by Badfinger

Studio album by Badfinger
- Released: 26 November 1973
- Recorded: 17–21 January 1972; 11 September 1972 – 14 January 1973; 2 April – 11 May 1973
- Studios: Apple, Olympic, Morgan, Trident (London); The Manor (Oxfordshire)
- Genre: Power pop
- Length: 39:38
- Label: Apple
- Producers: Chris Thomas, Badfinger; Todd Rundgren (tracks 4 and 9 only)

Badfinger chronology
| Straight Up (1971) | Ass (1973) | Badfinger (1974) |

Singles from Ass
- 1. "Apple of My Eye" Released: December 1973

Ass is the fifth studio album by the Welsh rock band Badfinger, and their last album released on Apple Records. The opening track, "Apple of My Eye", refers to the band leaving the label to begin its new contract with Warner Bros. Records.

The cover artwork, showing a donkey chasing a distant carrot, alludes to Badfinger's feelings that they had been misled by Apple. The cover was painted by Grammy Award-winning artist Peter Corriston, who would later create album covers for Led Zeppelin (Physical Graffiti) and the Rolling Stones (Some Girls, Tattoo You).

== Recording and release delays ==
Because of the dispute over Joey Molland's copyrights, Apple did not credit the individual writers of the songs on Ass, such as Tom Evans for "Blind Owl", instead crediting the song simply to "Badfinger".

Although recordings for the album began as early as January 1972, shortly after the release of Straight Up, Ass was not released until 26 November 1973 in the US and 8 March 1974 in the UK. The album was originally delayed because of production quality, as the band attempted to produce the album themselves after producer Todd Rundgren departed the project with just two songs recorded. After a first version of the album was rejected by the label, Apple engineer Chris Thomas was hired as a first-time producer to improve the overall recordings and make new track selections.

The album was further delayed when a disagreement surfaced between Apple and Badfinger's management on publishing copyrights. Half of the tracks on Ass were written by Joey Molland. Molland never signed a publishing agreement with Apple Music, unlike his three bandmates, who had signed such a publishing agreement when still in The Iveys. Instead, Molland assigned the individual copyrights of his songs that were selected for Badfinger albums to Apple Music after production. Badfinger's then-manager, Stan Polley, attempted to use Apple's lack of a publishing agreement with Molland to block release of the album; he told Molland not to agree to any individual assignments, and Molland obliged. Eventually, to circumvent Polley's strategy, writing credits for all songs on the US and UK album releases of Ass were credited by Apple to "Badfinger", not to the actual author of the song.

== Release ==
Professional ratings
Review scores
| Source | Rating |
|---|---|
| AllMusic | 2.5/5 stars |
| Encyclopedia of Popular Music | 2/5 stars |
| Mojo | 3/5 stars |
| Rolling Stone | (favourable) |
| Tom Hull | C+ |
| Uncut | 3/5 stars |

Ass peaked at number 122 on the Billboard 200 in the US. The single "Apple of My Eye" only peaked at number 102 on Billboard's "Bubbling Under" chart in America. The release of Ass caused the band's first album for Warner Bros. to be delayed. After the album was deleted from the Apple catalog a large number of heavily discounted copies appeared in cut-out bins at US record stores during the 1970s. The original CD version released in the 1990s is now rare because it was re-released only in a few countries (UK, Canada, and Japan) for a limited period. The album was remastered and re-released in 2010.

A few weeks prior to the 1990s CD release a few Abbey Road Studios mastered C90 cassettes of Ass were distributed to a handful of music industry people. It appears from the track listing on these cassettes that Ass was originally planned to have five bonus tracks: "Dreaming" (Molland), "Piano Red" (Ham), "Rock & Roll" (Evans), "Regular" (Molland) and "Do You Mind" (Molland). This idea was clearly scrapped, as "Do You Mind" was the only one included on that version of the album. (A different version of that song appeared on the 2010 remaster.)

Ass was the Apple Records label's last original album release that was not by an ex-Beatle. From then on, only the Beatles as solo artists were left to release records on the Apple label.

== Track listing ==
=== Original release ===
Side one

1. "Apple of My Eye" (Pete Ham) – 3:06
2. "Get Away" (Joey Molland) – 3:59
3. "Icicles" (Molland) – 2:32
4. "The Winner" (Molland) – 3:18
5. "Blind Owl" (Tom Evans) – 3:00

Side two

6. "Constitution" (Molland) – 2:58
7. "When I Say" (Evans) – 3:05
8. "Cowboy" (Mike Gibbins) – 2:37
9. "I Can Love You" (Molland) – 3:33
10. "Timeless" (Ham) – 7:39

=== 1992 CD reissue ===
Bonus track

11. "Do You Mind" (Molland) – 3:36

=== 2010 remastered album ===
Bonus tracks

11. "Do You Mind" [alternate version] (Molland) – 3:15
12. "Apple of My Eye" [early mix] (Ham) – 3:02
13. "Blind Owl" [alternate version] (Evans) – 2:52
14. "Regular" (Molland) – 2:39
15. "Timeless" [alternate version] (Ham) – 5:27

Supplementary bonus tracks with digital download

16. "Get Away" [alternate version] (Molland) – 3:32
17. "When I Say" [alternate version] (Evans) – 3:14
18. "The Winner" [alternate version] (Molland) – 3:15
19. "I Can Love You" [alternate version] (Molland) – 3:37
20. "Piano Red" [previously unreleased] (Ham) – 3:31

== Personnel ==
- Pete Ham – guitars, keyboards, vocals
- Tom Evans – bass guitar, vocals
- Joey Molland – guitars, keyboards, vocals
- Mike Gibbins – drums, vocals

== Charts ==
| Chart (1973) | Peak position |
|---|---|
| US Billboard 200 | 122 |
