= Day After Day (Badfinger song) =

1971 single by Badfinger

Single by Badfinger

from the album Straight Up
- B-side: "Money" (US); "Sweet Tuesday Morning" (UK)
- Released: 10 November 1971 (US); 14 January 1972 (UK)
- Recorded: 4, 8 June 1971
- Studio: EMI Studios, London
- Genre: Pop rock; power pop
- Length: 3:11
- Label: Apple
- Songwriter: Pete Ham
- Producer: George Harrison

Badfinger singles chronology
"No Matter What" (1970)	"Day After Day" (1971)	"Baby Blue" (1972)

"Day After Day" is a song by the British rock band Badfinger from their 1971 album Straight Up. It was written by Pete Ham and produced by George Harrison, who also plays slide guitar on the recording. The song was issued as a single and became Badfinger's biggest hit, charting at number 4 in the United States and number 10 in the UK, ultimately earning gold accreditation from the Recording Industry Association of America.

== Recording ==
"Day After Day" was written and sung by Pete Ham and produced by George Harrison, who plays some of the slide guitar parts of the song along with Ham. The record also features Leon Russell on piano. As the song was unfinished at the time Harrison left the Badfinger album to produce the Concert for Bangladesh, the final mix was done by Todd Rundgren, who took over Straight Up after Harrison's departure.

== Release ==
Released as a single in the US in November 1971 (January 1972 elsewhere), it would become the group's highest charting single there, peaking at number 4 on the Billboard Pop Singles chart. It also peaked at number 10 on the UK Singles Chart in January 1972. It remains one of the band's best-known songs, most notably for the slide guitar solos. It went Gold in March 1972, becoming the band's first and only gold single. "Day After Day" reached number 10 on Billboard's Easy Listening chart.

== Reception ==
Billboard said that "This driving rock ballad, penned by Pete Ham has it to re-establish [Badfinger] at the top of the chart once again." Cash Box said that "This ballad should bring them back to the pop charts, and leave us all hungry for more." Record World said that it is "produced in fine fashion by George Harrison" and that it should continue the group's streak of never missing with a single release.

Chris Evans chose it as an example of a Badfinger that shows that "though lyrical profundity may have been beyond them, there was plenty of mileage to be got out of the power ballad before Adrian Gurvitz and Michael Bolton came along."

Classic Rock critic Rob Hughes rated "Day After Day" as Badfinger's greatest song, due to the "unassailable melody, plaintive vocals and lovestruck sentiment" as well as Harrison's "wonderful slide solo." Ultimate Classic Rock critic Michael Gallucci rated it as Badfinger's 2nd best song, highlighting Harrison's "distinctive guitar playing." Classic Rock History critic Janey Roberts also rated it as Badfinger's 2nd best song.

== Personnel ==
Badfinger

- Pete Ham – lead vocals, acoustic guitar, slide guitar
- Tom Evans – backing vocals, bass guitar
- Joey Molland – backing vocals, acoustic guitar
- Mike Gibbins – drums, percussion

Additional musicians

- George Harrison – slide guitar
- Leon Russell – piano

== Chart performance ==
=== Weekly charts ===
Chart (1971–1972)	Peak position
Australian (Go-Set National Top 40)	7
Australian (Kent Music Report)	6
Canada Top Singles (RPM)	2
Ireland (IRMA)	13
Netherlands (Single Top 100)	19
New Zealand (Listener)	3
UK Singles Chart	10
US Billboard Hot 100	4
US Billboard Easy Listening	10
US Cash Box Top 100	3
US Record World Singles Chart	1

=== Year-end charts ===
Chart (1972)	Rank
Canada (RPM)	9
US Billboard Hot 100	39
US Cash Box	48

== Certifications ==
Region	Certification	Certified units/sales
United States (RIAA)	Gold	1,000,000^{^}
^{^} Shipments figures based on certification alone.
