= Straight Up (Badfinger album) =

Studio album by Badfinger
- Released: 13 December 1971
- Recorded: 30 May – 6 October 1971
- Studio: EMI, AIR, Morgan and Command (London)
- Genre: Power pop
- Length: 42:11
- Label: Apple
- Producer: Todd Rundgren, George Harrison

Badfinger chronology
No Dice (1970)	Straight Up (1971)	Ass (1973)

Singles from Straight Up
- 1. "Day After Day" Released: 10 November 1971 (US); 14 January 1972 (UK); 2. "Baby Blue" Released: 6 March 1972 (US)

Straight Up is the fourth studio album by the Welsh rock band Badfinger, released in December 1971 in the United States and February 1972 in Britain. Issued on the Beatles' Apple record label, it includes the hit singles "Day After Day" and "Baby Blue", and the similarly popular "Name of the Game", all of which were written by singer and guitarist Pete Ham. The album marked a departure from the more rock-oriented sound of Badfinger's previous releases, partly as a result of intervention by Apple Records regarding the band's musical direction.

Production on what became Straight Up lasted nine months, at the start of which the group made an album's worth of recordings with producer Geoff Emerick, in between their touring commitments. Once Apple had decided to shelve these recordings, George Harrison took over production, only for him to become preoccupied with organizing the Concert for Bangladesh, at which Badfinger also performed. Harrison then handed the project to American producer Todd Rundgren, who oversaw recording for most of the album.

Although Straight Up received a mixed response from critics on release, many reviewers now regard it as the band's best album. Rolling Stone critic David Fricke has referred to it as "Badfinger's power-pop apex". The album was reissued on CD in 1993, with bonus tracks, and remastered again in 2010.

== Background ==
Badfinger preceded the recording of their third album, Straight Up, with the well-received No Dice (1970), and a series of acclaimed shows at Ungano's in New York that helped establish the group in America. Out of appreciation for the band's contributions to his first post-Beatles solo album, All Things Must Pass, George Harrison introduced Badfinger on their opening night at Ungano's, about which Janis Schacht of Circus reported: "For a while, most people watched George Harrison watching Badfinger, then everyone noticed how good Badfinger were – good enough to draw attention away from a former Beatle."

While attractive to American audiences, the association with the Beatles, partly through Badfinger being an Apple Records act, continued to hinder the band's attempts to forge their own identity. Having already tired of playing their debut hit song, the Paul McCartney-written "Come and Get It", Badfinger would experience similar artistic compromises during the production of Straight Up. In other areas of the group's operation, all four members signed a management deal with American agent Stan Polley in November 1970, and the band hired part of Clearwell Castle in Gloucestershire as a base for songwriting and rehearsing.

== Recording ==
=== Rejected recordings with Geoff Emerick ===
Initial sessions for the new album began in January 1971 at London's Abbey Road Studios, under the direction of Geoff Emerick, who had produced the bulk of No Dice. The band also worked at Command Studios in central London and at AIR Studios, the facility owned by former Beatles producer George Martin. Twelve tracks from these Emerick-produced sessions were completed by March, with the band rushing to finish the untitled album before reluctantly leaving for a two-month US tour that Polley had booked.

The Pete Ham-written "Name of the Game" was scheduled for release as a single – only for Phil Spector, as de facto head of A&R at Apple, to cancel the release. According to author Richard Williams, Spector deemed the track an inadequate follow-up to the band's hit single off No Dice, "No Matter What". Although Badfinger guitarist Joey Molland has said that Harrison was responsible for the Emerick recordings being rejected, the band's biographer, Dan Matovina, writes that the rejection had in fact come from Allan Steckler, head of Apple's US operation, where most of the record label's decisions were now made. (Note: While Apple Records continued to sign new acts through to the end of 1972, Allen Klein, as business manager of Apple Corps, had dismissed almost all of the staff at the company's London offices by August 1970.) Spector and Harrison submitted a remixed version of "Name of the Game" on 23 April, which also met with disapproval from Steckler. While the band were in New York during the tour, they attended a session at Bell Studio, where Al Kooper overdubbed piano and organ onto the track; Kooper's subsequent mix of the song was similarly unsuccessful.

Knowing that Harrison rated the band highly, Steckler asked him to work with the group. Apple thereby shelved the Emerick-produced album, six songs from which Badfinger would re-record for the eventual release. In a January 1972 interview with Disc and Music Echo, Ham reflected that the band had realised after this 1971 tour that they were unhappy with the initial sessions, saying: "we tried to do an album [in between tours] and we didn't have enough time."

=== Sessions with George Harrison and the Concert for Bangladesh ===
Harrison was keen to see the band create a more mature work in the style of the Beatles' 1969 album Abbey Road, a vision that Ham shared. From 30 May, Badfinger worked with their new producer at Abbey Road, taping four of the twelve songs eventually issued on Straight Up. The tracks were new versions of "Name of the Game" and "Suitcase", the latter written by Molland and also previously recorded with Emerick; "Day After Day", a new love song by Ham; and the Molland composition "I'd Die Babe".

Molland later recalled that Harrison virtually "joined the band", by contributing on guitar during these sessions. Harrison was particularly drawn to "Day After Day", on which he performed a slide guitar duet with Ham. Later, he added a piano overdub by Leon Russell, whom Badfinger had supported on their recent US tour. Harrison played acoustic and electric guitars on "I'd Die Babe", and provided the musical arrangement for "Suitcase". Another outside musician, Klaus Voormann, contributed the electric piano part on "Suitcase", which featured Russell playing guitar.

The band took a break from recording late in June, as Harrison worked in Los Angeles with Indian musician Ravi Shankar, producing the soundtrack to Raga. At Shankar's urgent request, Harrison agreed to stage the Concert for Bangladesh in New York, and so flew back to London on 12 July to explain to Badfinger that he would be unable to complete his work on Straight Up, while inviting them to play at the benefit concerts on 1 August. Reprising their roles from the All Things Must Pass sessions, Ham, Tom Evans and Molland performed as acoustic rhythm guitarists at the shows and Mike Gibbins played percussion. In addition, despite having had no rehearsal beforehand, Ham duetted with Harrison on an acoustic version of "Here Comes the Sun".

=== Sessions with Todd Rundgren and album completion ===
During September 1971, with Harrison embroiled in preparing the Bangladesh live album and concert film for release, Apple hired Todd Rundgren to finish Badfinger's album. According to Ham, Rundgren had met Harrison in New York and expressed interest in working with the group.

In addition to working with Rundgren in London on some more recent compositions, the band re-recorded two songs from the Emerick sessions: "Money", written by Evans, and Ham's "Perfection". Two tracks were holdovers from the Geoff Emerick sessions: Rundgren re-mixed and sped up "Flying", while "Sweet Tuesday Morning", Molland's love song to his wife Kathie, was overdubbed and remixed. All these tracks appeared on the released album, as did the new songs "Take It All", Ham's reflection on performing at the Concert for Bangladesh, and the opening track to Straight Up; "Sometimes", by Molland; and "It's Over", Evans' tribute to the band's American fans. The other new recording was "Baby Blue", written by Ham and likewise inspired by the recent US tour. Rundgren worked quickly on the project, completing the recordings in two weeks. Rather than an easy collaboration, however, the sessions with Rundgren created what Terry Staunton of Record Collector describes as "studio friction between the American [producer] and his charges".

Rundgren did the final mix for the whole album. He was upset not to receive a co-production credit for any of the Harrison-produced tracks, later telling author Peter Doggett: "[Harrison] didn't finish any of the songs, though he was perfectly willing to take the credit for the songs that I finished." Although admiring of Rundgren's technical abilities in the studio, Badfinger were vocal in their opposition to his working methods; Matovina wrote in a 1979 article for Trouser Press: "According to the band, he was totally domineering and had little respect for their ideas. Todd made the album slick and simple, and an abundance of the group’s natural energy was lost." While Ham was especially positive about working with Harrison, and Molland described it as "a great experience, he was a master in the studio … very encouraging and co-operative", Molland has also rued the band's loss of creative control, such that the result was far from their original vision.

== Release ==
Apple released Straight Up on 13 December 1971 in America (with Apple catalogue number SW 3387) and on 11 February 1972 in Britain (as Apple SAPCOR 19). The album's lead single, "Day After Day" backed with "Money", was issued on 10 November 1971 in the United States, but the single was delayed until 14 January in the UK, where the B-side was "Sweet Tuesday Morning". The album's art design was credited to Gene Mahon and Richard DiLello, the last of whom took the group photographs used on the front and rear of the cover. A note on the sleeve offered "special thanks" to Geoff Emerick. The front cover portrait encouraged further comparison with the Beatles, as one commentator described the album as Badfinger for Sale in reference to the similarly titled 1964 release by the Beatles.

In America, Straight Up peaked at number 31 during a 32-week run on Billboard's Top 200 LPs, while it placed inside the top twenty on albums charts in Canada and Australia. "Day After Day" became Badfinger's highest-charting single on the US Billboard Hot 100, peaking at number 4, and was certified gold by the RIAA on 4 March. Although the album failed to place on the UK's top 40 albums chart, "Day After Day" was the band's third top-ten hit there, peaking at number 10.

As the follow-up single, "Baby Blue" peaked at number 14 on the Hot 100, and "Name of the Game" became another popular track on US radio. The album's success was marred by a lack of promotion by Apple, which had scheduled "Baby Blue" as a single in the United Kingdom but then cancelled the release. (Note: In 2013, "Baby Blue" enjoyed a surge in popularity following its inclusion in the final episode of the US television series Breaking Bad. When belatedly issued as a UK single that year, the song peaked at number 73.)

== Reissue ==
=== 1993 ===
The album was remastered by Ron Furmanek at Abbey Road in March 1992 and released on CD in June 1993. As bonus tracks, this reissue included the original, Emerick-produced recordings of "Name of the Game", "Suitcase", "Money", "Flying" and "Perfection". Record Collector contributor Andy Davis supplied a liner note essay for the release, with research provided by Matovina.

Among the differences in musical arrangements between the bonus tracks and the 1971-issued versions, "Name of the Game" features horns and orchestration not found on Harrison's later production, and "Money" and "Flying" similarly have orchestral parts, arranged by George Martin. The lyrics of "Suitcase" include the mention of "pusher" that Harrison had asked Molland to change (in favour of the word "butcher"), to ensure that the song received radio play. "Perfection" features instrumentation such as synthesizer and harmonica, but not the percussion parts found on the Rundgren-produced version. The final bonus track on the 1993 reissue was the US single mix of "Baby Blue", the main difference being the addition of extra reverberation on Gibbins' snare drum.

=== 2010 ===
In October 2010, Straight Up was remastered again for inclusion in the 17-disc Apple Box Set. As in 1993, the reissue added the discarded version of "Name of the Game" and the alternate mix of "Baby Blue". The remaining bonus tracks were all from the January–March 1971 sessions with Emerick. One song had previously appeared on the 1992 No Dice CD: "I'll Be the One", written by all four members of the group, and rejected as a possible single after Harrison had deemed it "too Beatley". The other bonus tracks were all previously unreleased: "Baby, Please", a collaboration between Ham, Molland and Gibbins; and the Evans compositions "No Good at All" and "Sing for the Song". In the CD's liner notes, again written by Davis, Molland recalls that Emerick and "No Matter What" producer Mal Evans were among the many chorus singers on "Sing for the Song".

The versions of "Suitcase", "Money", "Flying" and "Perfection" from the 1993 reissue appeared in the Apple Box Set on a separate bonus disc, comprising 20 rare Badfinger recordings, and were also made available for digital download. Also available in these latter formats were three more tracks from the album that Apple had rejected in 1971: an early version of "Sweet Tuesday Morning", along with "Mean, Mean Jemima" and "Loving You". The last two songs were written by Molland and Gibbins, respectively, and originally appeared on No Dice in 1992. With this 2010 reissue, all of the Emerick-produced tracks have now been officially released. (Note: The intended running order for the discarded version of the LP was as follows: (side one) "Suitcase", "I'll Be the One", "No Good at All", "Sweet Tuesday Morning", "Baby Please", "Mean, Mean Jemima"; (side two) "Name of the Game", "Loving You", "Money", "Flying", "Sing for the Song" and "Perfection".)

== Reception ==
=== Contemporary reviews ===
On release in 1971, Straight Up was much maligned in Rolling Stone. The magazine's reviewer, Mike Saunders, previously a champion of the band, called it "a barely decent album, one which is the poorest of Badfinger's three LPs and by far the least likeable". Saunders derided the songwriting and production, and lamented that the group had abandoned its previous "unabashed rock and roll energy", adding: "With Straight Up, Badfinger seem to have already reached the Beatles' Revolver stage: a stultifying self-conscious artiness, a loss of previous essential virtues, and far too much general farting around."

Writing in Disc and Music Echo, Caroline Boucher opined: "Badfinger's sound is that of the Beatles in the Rubber Soul era without the Beatles magic exuberance … The album, overall, doesn't have enough light and shade." Alan Niester of Creem described the Harrison-produced tracks as "without exception the stronger" beside Rundgren's "more common and forgettable" work, but found the band's new sound "a curiously bland and unremarkable blend of guitars, drums, and nubile voices that really doesn’t go anywhere or in much of a blaze of hurry". While admitting his fondness for the group's previous "Beatle rip-offs", Niester opined: "Badfinger would be better off doing twelve of the Beatles' greatest hits and doing them without all this pretension of originality."

Other contemporary reviews compared Straight Up to past works by the Beatles in a more favourable light. Beat Instrumental described the album as "a good 'un", and Jim Girard of Scene recognised "Perfection" and "Sometimes" as possible singles and said that Badfinger's "importance lies in their unpretentiousness and commercial potency". In the December 1972 issue of Hit Parader, Frank Maier praised the album while comparing it to No Dice, saying, "The progress is unbelievable and very enjoyable … It holds simplicity and yet has enough complication to keep it from being boring", and highlighted Harrison's "beautiful slide work" on "Day After Day".

In his 1979 article on the band in Trouser Press, Dan Matovina bemoaned Harrison's reworking of "Day After Day" into "a distinct copy of his own sound", from the point of view of Badfinger's career, while describing the song and "Baby Blue" as "dazzling hits". Matovina concluded of Straight Up: "What came out was a great album due to the tremendous songs, but one which lacked overall vitality. Also, in the process of the recording, many brilliant tracks were discarded ... All the [released] songs are top rate, it's a wholly consistent well-done record, only not exactly what the group desired."

=== Retrospective reviews and legacy ===
Professional ratings
Review scores
Source	Rating
AllMusic	4.5/5 stars
Christgau's Record Guide	B−
Encyclopedia of Popular Music	4/5 stars
The Great Rock Discography	7/10
Mojo	4/5 stars
MusicHound	5/5
Q	4/5 stars
Record Collector	4/5 stars
The Rolling Stone Album Guide	3.5/5 stars
Uncut	4/5 stars

After its mixed reception on release, Straight Up has come to be recognised by many critics as Badfinger's best album. Reviewing the 1993 CD release, Q magazine described Straight Up as "brimming with mature melodies and bracing verse/chorus interplay", and "More complete than their other long-play selections and resplendent with previously unheard gems". The NME deemed it "[a] stone cold beauty of an album" and advised: "Love it like your mother …" In a five-star review for the album, William Hanson of MusicHound opined that while No Dice "established Ham as a versatile rock vocalist and imaginative songwriter", Straight Up "assured [the band] a spot in pop history" thanks to its "unforgettable" singles.

AllMusic editor Stephen Thomas Erlewine writes: "Frankly, the increased production is for the best, since Badfinger sounds best when there's as much craft in the production as there is in the writing. Here, there's absolutely no filler and everybody is in top form. Pete Ham's 'Baby Blue' is textbook power-pop – irresistibly catchy fuzz riffs and sighing melodies – and with its Harrison-esque slide guitars, 'Day After Day' is so gorgeous it practically aches." While also highlighting Evans' "It's Over" and particularly Molland's "emergence as a songwriter", Erlewine concludes: "This fine songwriting, combined with sharp performances and exquisite studio craft, make Straight Up one of the cornerstones of power pop, a record that proved that it was possible to make classic guitar-pop after its golden era had passed." Todd Totale of the website Glorious Noise describes Straight Up as "impeccably sequenced" and the group's "best album", adding that it "stands tall against even the Beatles' solo efforts while reaching for [that] band's lofty mid-period gems".

Reviewing the 2010 reissues of Badfinger's Apple output, Joe Marchese of The Second Disc writes of their third album: "Straight Up might just be Badfinger's masterpiece, and its consistency is remarkable considering the three diverse, and strong-willed, producers involved." David Fricke of Rolling Stone lists Straight Up first among his top five non-Beatle Apple albums, describing it as "Badfinger's power-pop apex, despite its difficult birth". In his review for Blogcritics, Glen Boyd opines that "with Straight Up, Badfinger delivered one of the first power pop records of the post-Beatles era, and perhaps one of the best of all time", and admires the remastering of the original album.

== Track listing ==
=== Original release ===
Side one
No.	Title	Writer(s)	Length
1.	"Take It All"	Pete Ham	4:25
2.	"Baby Blue"	Ham	3:37
3.	"Money"	Tom Evans	3:29
4.	"Flying"	Evans, Joey Molland	2:38
5.	"I'd Die Babe"	Molland	2:33
6.	"Name of the Game"	Ham	5:19

Side two
No.	Title	Writer(s)	Length
7.	"Suitcase"	Molland	2:53
8.	"Sweet Tuesday Morning"	Molland	2:31
9.	"Day After Day"	Ham	3:11
10.	"Sometimes"	Molland	2:56
11.	"Perfection"	Ham	5:07
12.	"It's Over"	Evans	3:34

=== 1993 CD release ===
Tracks 1–12 per sides one and two of the original album, with the following bonus tracks:

13. "Money" [Original Version] (Evans) – 4:20
14. "Flying" [Original Version] (Evans, Molland) – 2:25
15. "Name of the Game" [Original Version] (Ham) – 4:27
16. "Suitcase" [Original Version] (Molland) – 3:20
17. "Perfection" [Original Version] (Ham) – 4:41
18. "Baby Blue" [US Single Mix] (Ham) – 3:35

=== 2010 remaster ===
Tracks 1–12 per sides one and two of the original album, with the following bonus tracks:

13. "I'll Be the One" (Evans, Mike Gibbins, Ham, Molland) – 2:57
14. "Name of the Game" [Earlier Version] (Ham) – 4:24
15. "Baby Blue" [US Single Mix] (Ham) – 3:36
16. "Baby, Please" (Ham, Gibbins, Molland) – 3:05
17. "No Good at All" (Evans) – 2:10
18. "Sing for the Song" (Evans) – 3:20

Digital-download extra bonus tracks

19. "Money" [Earlier Version] (Evans) – 4:21
20. "Flying" [Earlier Version] (Molland, Evans) – 2:24
21. "Perfection" [Earlier Version] (Ham) – 4:40
22. "Suitcase" [Earlier Version] (Molland) – 3:18
23. "Sweet Tuesday Morning" [Earlier Version] (Molland) – 2:33
24. "Mean, Mean Jemima" (Molland) – 3:42
25. "Loving You" (Gibbins) – 2:52

== Personnel ==
Badfinger

- Pete Ham – vocals, lead and rhythm guitars, piano, organ on "Take It All", harmonica on "Perfection" [Earlier version], slide guitar on "Suitcase"
- Tom Evans – vocals, bass guitar, twelve string guitar on "Sweet Tuesday Morning" and "Perfection"
- Joey Molland – vocals, rhythm and lead guitar
- Mike Gibbins – drums, percussion

Additional musicians

- George Harrison – slide guitar on "Day After Day", guitar on "I'd Die Babe"
- Leon Russell – piano on "Day After Day", guitar on "Suitcase"
- Bobby Diebold – bass guitar on "Suitcase"
- Keith H - bass guitar session assistant
- Klaus Voormann – electric piano on "Suitcase"
- Gary Wright - piano on "Name of the Game" (unconfirmed)
- Al Kooper - piano on "Name of the Game" (earlier version)
- Bill Collins – accordion on "Sweet Tuesday Morning"

Production and technical staff

- Todd Rundgren – producer (tracks 1–4, 8, 10–12)
- George Harrison – producer (tracks 5–7, 9)
- Gene Mahon – design
- Richard DiLello – design, photography
- Peter Mew – engineer
- Mike Jarratt – engineer
- Marcia McGovern – pre-production director
- Roberta Ballard – production manager

CD reissue supplementary credits

- Geoff Emerick – producer (bonus tracks only)
- Andy Davis – liner notes
- Ron Furmanek – mastering, research

== Charts ==
=== Peak positions ===
Chart (1972)	Position
Australian Go-Set Top 20 Albums	16
Canadian RPM 100 Albums	13
US Billboard Top LPs & Tape	31

=== Year-end charts ===
Chart (1972)	Position
US Billboard Pop Albums	59

== Sources ==
- Badman, Keith (2001). The Beatles Diary Volume 2: After the Break-Up 1970–2001. London: Omnibus Press. ISBN 978-0-7119-8307-6.
- Castleman, Harry; Podrazik, Walter J. (1976). All Together Now: The First Complete Beatles Discography 1961–1975. New York, NY: Ballantine Books. ISBN 0-345-25680-8.
- Doggett, Peter (2011). You Never Give Me Your Money: The Beatles After the Breakup. New York, NY: It Books. ISBN 978-0-06-177418-8.
- Graff, Gary; Durchholz, Daniel, eds. (1999). MusicHound Rock: The Essential Album Guide. Farmington Hills, MI: Visible Ink Press. ISBN 1-57859-061-2.
- Larkin, Colin (2006). The Encyclopedia of Popular Music (4th edn), Volume 1. New York, NY: Oxford University Press. ISBN 0-19-531373-9.
- Lavezzoli, Peter (2006). The Dawn of Indian Music in the West. New York, NY: Continuum. ISBN 0-8264-2819-3.
- Leng, Simon (2006). While My Guitar Gently Weeps: The Music of George Harrison. Milwaukee, WI: Hal Leonard. ISBN 978-1-4234-0609-9.
- Madinger, Chip; Easter, Mark (2000). Eight Arms to Hold You: The Solo Beatles Compendium. Chesterfield, MO: 44.1 Productions. ISBN 0-615-11724-4.
- Matovina, Dan (2000). Without You: The Tragic Story of Badfinger. Frances Glover Books. ISBN 0-9657122-2-2.
- Murrells, Joseph (1984). Million Selling Records from the 1900s to the 1980s. London: Batsford. ISBN 978-0-7134-3843-7.
- Rodriguez, Robert (2010). Fab Four FAQ 2.0: The Beatles' Solo Years, 1970–1980. Milwaukee, WI: Backbeat Books. ISBN 978-1-4165-9093-4.
- Spizer, Bruce (2005). The Beatles Solo on Apple Records. New Orleans, LA: 498 Productions. ISBN 0-9662649-5-9.
- Williams, Richard (2003). Phil Spector: Out of His Head. London: Omnibus Press. ISBN 978-0-7119-9864-3.
