= The Concert for Bangladesh =

1971 benefit concerts in New York City

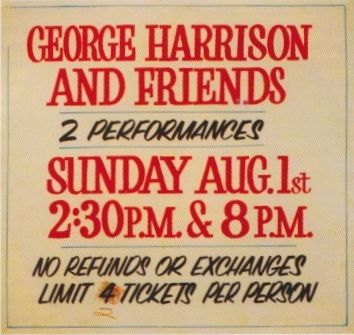
- Poster outside the Madison Square Garden box office, July 1971
- Genre: Rock
- Dates: 1 August 1971
- Locations: Madison Square Garden, New York City, US
- Founders: George Harrison, Ravi Shankar

The Concert for Bangladesh (or Bangla Desh, as the country's name was originally spelled) was a pair of benefit concerts organised by former Beatles guitarist George Harrison and the Indian sitar player Ravi Shankar. The shows were held at 2:30 and 8:00 pm on Sunday, 1 August 1971, at Madison Square Garden in New York City, to raise international awareness of, and fund relief for refugees from East Pakistan, following the Bangladesh Liberation War-related genocide and the 1970 Bhola cyclone. The concerts were followed by a bestselling live album, a boxed three-record set, and Apple Films' concert documentary, which opened in cinemas in the spring of 1972.

The event was the first-ever benefit of such magnitude, and featured a supergroup of performers that included Harrison, fellow ex-Beatle Ringo Starr, Bob Dylan, Eric Clapton, Billy Preston, Leon Russell and the band Badfinger. In addition, Shankar and Ali Akbar Khan – both of whom had ancestral roots in Bangladesh – performed an opening set of Indian classical music. The concerts were attended by a total of 40,000 people, and the initial gate receipts raised close to $250,000 for Bangladesh relief, which was administered by UNICEF.

Harrison attempted unsuccessfully to get the recording industry to release the rights for performers to share the stage, and millions of dollars raised from the album and film were tied up in IRS tax escrow accounts for years, but the concert has been recognised as an influential humanitarian aid project, generating both awareness and considerable funds as well as influencing and laying the groundwork for projects that followed, such as Live Aid.

By 1985, through revenue raised from the Concert for Bangladesh live album and film, an estimated $12 million had been sent to Bangladesh, and sales of the live album and DVD release of the film continue to benefit the George Harrison Fund for UNICEF. Decades later, Shankar would say of the overwhelming success of the event: "In one day, the whole world knew the name of Bangladesh. It was a fantastic occasion."

== Background ==
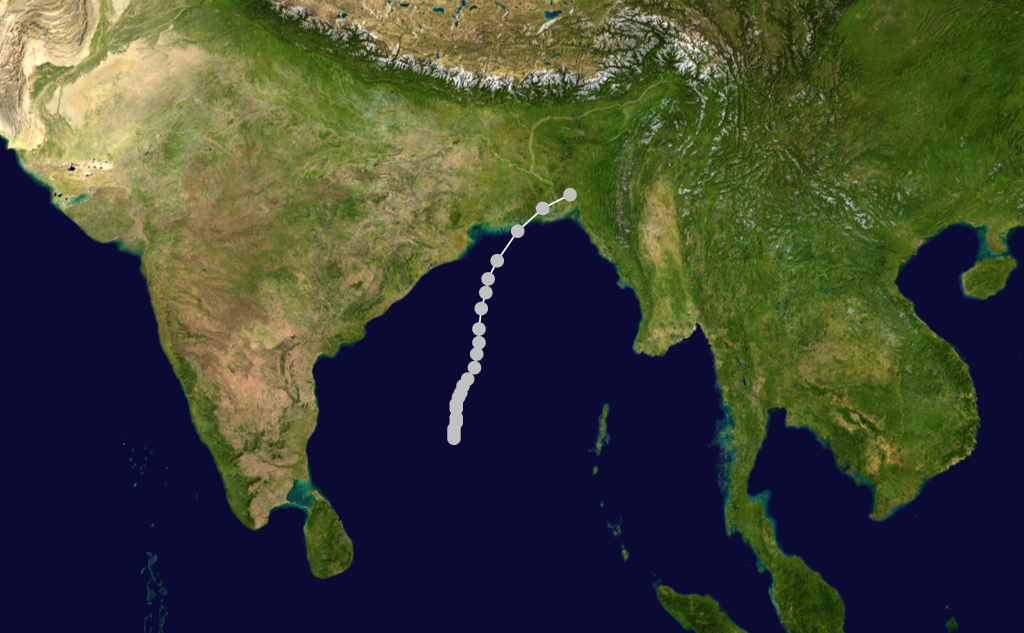
Bhola cyclone track during the second week of November 1970

As East Pakistan struggled to become the separate state of Bangladesh during the 1971 Bangladesh Liberation War, the political and military turmoil and associated atrocities led to a massive refugee crisis, with almost 10 million displaced people pouring into neighbouring India. East Pakistan had recently in 1970, endured devastation as a result of the Bhola cyclone, and the Bengalis' desperate plight increased in March that year when torrential rains and floods arrived in the region, threatening a humanitarian disaster. Quoting figures available at the time, a Rolling Stone feature claimed that up to half a million Bengalis had been killed by the cyclone in November 1970 and that the Pakistani army's subsequent campaign of slaughter under Operation Searchlight accounted for at least 250,000 civilians, "by the most conservative estimates". Following the mass exodus to Calcutta, a new threat arrived as the refugees faced starvation and the outbreak of diseases such as cholera.

I was in a very sad mood, having read all this news, and I said, "George, this is the situation, I know it doesn't concern you, I know you can't possibly identify." But while I talked to George he was very deeply moved ... and he said, "Yes, I think I'll be able to do something."

— Ravi Shankar, 1971

Appalled at the situation affecting his homeland and relatives, Bengali musician Ravi Shankar first brought the issue to the attention of his friend George Harrison in the early months of 1971, over dinner at Friar Park, according to Klaus Voormann's recollection. By April, Shankar and Harrison were in Los Angeles working on the soundtrack to the film Raga, during which Harrison wrote the song "Miss O'Dell", commenting on corruption among the Indian authorities as aid shipments of rice from the West kept "going astray on [their] way to Bombay". After returning to England to produce Badfinger's Straight Up album and take part in sessions for John Lennon's Imagine – all the while, being kept abreast of developments by Shankar, via newspaper and magazine cuttings – Harrison was back in Los Angeles to finish the Raga album in late June. By then, the Sunday Times in London had just published an influential article by Pakistani journalist Anthony Mascarenhas, which exposed the full horror of the Bangladesh atrocities, and a distraught Shankar approached Harrison for help in trying to alleviate the suffering. Harrison later talked of spending "three months" on the phone organising the Concert for Bangladesh, implying that efforts were under way from late April onwards; it is now widely acknowledged that the project began in earnest during the last week of June 1971, however, five or six weeks before the event took place on 1 August.

== Preparation ==
Shankar's original hope was to raise $25,000 through a benefit concert of his own, compered perhaps by actor Peter Sellers. With Harrison's commitment, and the record and film outlets available to him through the Beatles' Apple Corps organisation, the idea soon grew to become a star-studded musical event, mixing Western rock with Indian classical music, and it was to be held at the most prestigious venue in America: Madison Square Garden, in New York City. According to Chris O'Dell, a music-business administrator and former Apple employee, Harrison got off the phone with Shankar once the concept had been finalised, and started enthusing with his wife, Pattie Boyd, about possible performers. Ringo Starr, Lennon, Eric Clapton, Leon Russell, Jim Keltner, Voormann, Billy Preston and Badfinger were all mentioned during this initial brainstorming.

The Concert For Bangladesh happened because of my relationship with Ravi ... I said, "If you want me to be involved, I think I'd better be really involved," so I started recruiting all these people.

— George Harrison, 1992

O'Dell set about contacting local musicians from the Harrisons' rented house in Nichols Canyon, as Harrison took the long-distance calls, hoping more than anything to secure Bob Dylan's participation. Almost all of Harrison's first-choice names signed on immediately, while a day spent boating with Memphis musician Don Nix resulted in the latter agreeing to organise a group of backing singers. A local Indian astrologer had advised early August as a good time in which to stage the concert, and as things transpired, the first day of that month, a Sunday, was the only day that Madison Square Garden was available at such short notice.

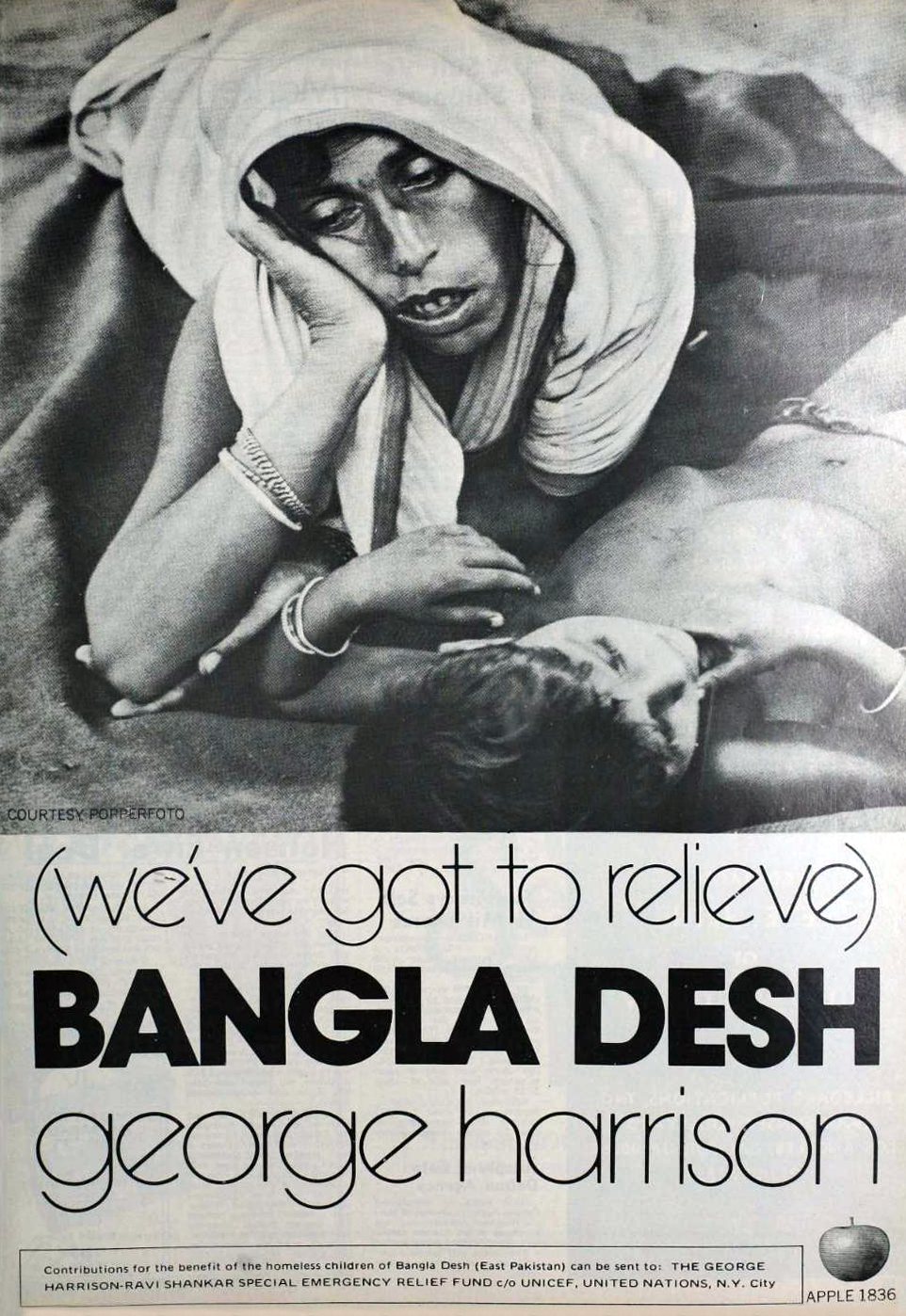
Trade ad for Harrison's "Bangla Desh" single, August 1971

By the first week of July, Harrison was in a Los Angeles studio recording his purpose-written song, "Bangla Desh", with co-producer Phil Spector. The song's opening verse documents Shankar's plea to Harrison for assistance, and the lyrics "My friend came to me with sadness in his eyes / Told me that he wanted help before his country dies" provided an enduring image for what United Nations Secretary-General Kofi Annan later recognised as the basic human aspect behind the cause.

Harrison then met with Badfinger in London to explain that he would have to abandon work on Straight Up, before flying to New York on 13 July to see Lennon. During the middle of July also, once back in Los Angeles, Harrison produced Shankar's Bangladesh benefit record, an EP titled Joi Bangla. The latter featured contributions from East Bengal-born Ali Akbar Khan, on sarod, and tabla player Alla Rakha. As with Harrison's "Bangla Desh", all profits from this recording would go to the newly established George Harrison–Ravi Shankar Special Emergency Relief Fund, to be distributed by UNICEF. (Note: Around this time, a phone call went out to Mick Jagger, who was forced to turn down Harrison's invitation to perform, due to the Rolling Stones' precarious situation as tax exiles in France.) Also around the middle of July, the upcoming concert by "George Harrison and Friends" was announced "via a minuscule ad buried in the back pages of the New York Times", author Nicholas Schaffner wrote in 1977. Tickets sold out in no time, leading to the announcement of a second show.

Towards the end of the month, when all parties were due to meet in New York for rehearsals, Harrison had the commitment of a backing band comprising Preston on keyboards, the four members of Badfinger on acoustic rhythm guitars and tambourine, Voormann and Keltner, on bass and drums, respectively, and saxophonist Jim Horn's so-called "Hollywood Horns", which included Chuck Findley, Jackie Kelso and Lou McCreary. Of the established stars, Leon Russell had committed also, but on the proviso that he be supported by members of his tour band. Eric Clapton insisted that he too would be there, even though O'Dell and other insiders, knowing of the guitarist's incapacity due to severe heroin addiction, were surprised that Harrison had considered him for the occasion.

Among Harrison's former bandmates, Lennon initially agreed to take part in the concert without his wife and musical partner Yoko Ono, as Harrison had apparently stipulated. Lennon then allegedly had an argument with Ono as a result of this agreement and left New York in a rage two days before the concerts. (Note: Lennon soon offered a different version of events, blaming manager Allen Klein for spreading false rumours, yet coming up with a story of his own that seemed to make a more damning case against himself: "I just didn't feel like it. We were in the Virgin Islands and I certainly wasn't going to be rehearsing in New York, then going back to the Virgin Islands, then coming back up to New York and singing.") Starr's commitment had never been in question, and he interrupted the filming of his movie Blindman in Almeria, Spain, in order to attend. Paul McCartney declined to take part, however, citing the bad feelings caused by the Beatles' legal problems on their break-up. (Note: In a November 1971 interview with Chris Charlesworth of Melody Maker, McCartney said that his decision had been based partly on Klein's involvement. According to McCartney, a Beatles reunion would have been "an historical event", for which "Klein would have taken the credit".)

== Rehearsals ==
The Harrisons decamped to the Park Lane Hotel in New York City, and the first rehearsal took place on Monday, 26 July, at Nola Studios on West 57th Street. Harrison had written a possible setlist for the concert while sketching design ideas for Shankar's Joi Bangla picture sleeve. As well as the songs he would go on to perform on 1 August, Harrison's list included his own compositions "All Things Must Pass" – "with Leon [Russell]", apparently – "Art of Dying" and the just-recorded B-side "Deep Blue"; Clapton's song "Let It Rain" appeared also, while the suggestions for Dylan's set were "If Not for You", "Watching the River Flow" (his recent, Leon Russell-produced single) and "Blowin' in the Wind". Only Harrison, Voormann, the six-piece horn section, and Badfinger's Pete Ham, Joey Molland, Tom Evans and Mike Gibbins were at Nola Studios on that first day, and subsequent rehearsals were similarly carried out in "dribs and drabs", as Harrison put it. Only the final run-through, on the night before the concert, resembled a complete band rehearsal. (Note: One such informal rehearsal took place in Harrison's hotel room, where he and guitarist Peter Frampton ran through the entire set – a measure, Frampton later realised, taken by Harrison to cover for the increasing likelihood of Clapton's non-attendance at the event.)

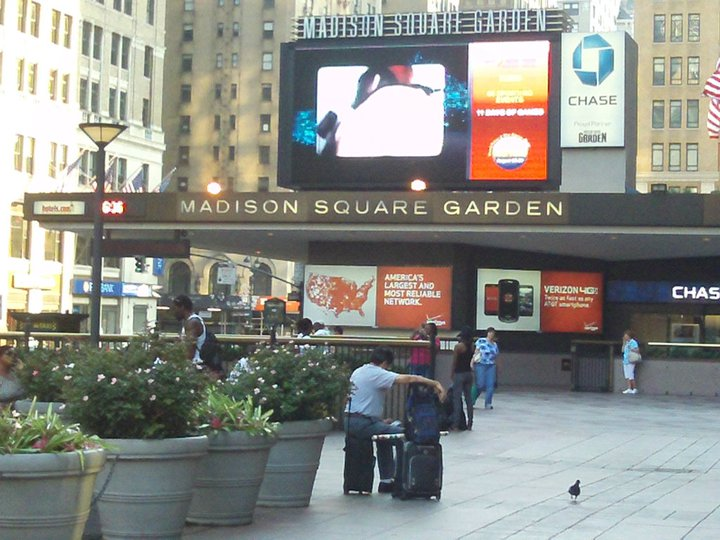
The Madison Square Garden marquee, pictured in 2011

On Tuesday, 27 July, Harrison and Shankar, accompanied by a pipe-smoking Allen Klein, held a press conference to promote the two shows; notoriously performance-shy, Harrison said "Just thinking about it makes me shake." The "Bangla Desh" charity single was issued in America on 28 July, with a UK release following two days later. Ringo Starr arrived on the Thursday, and by Friday, 30 July, Russell was in town, interrupting his US tour. Russell's band members Claudia Lennear and Don Preston were added to Don Nix's choir of backing singers; Preston would switch to lead guitar for Russell's solo spot during the shows, just as bassist Carl Radle would replace Voormann temporarily. By this point, Clapton's participation was gravely in doubt, and Harrison had drafted in Jesse Ed Davis as a probable replacement. The ex-Taj Mahal guitarist received last-minute coaching from Voormann, who was more than familiar with Harrison's songs, as well as those by Billy Preston and Starr.

The final rehearsal, the first for some of the participants, was combined with the concert soundcheck, at Madison Square Garden, late on 31 July. Both Dylan and Clapton finally appeared at the soundcheck that night. Even then, Clapton was in the early stages of heroin withdrawal – only a cameraman supplying him with some methadone would result in the English guitarist taking the stage the following day, after his then-girlfriend Alice Ormsby-Gore had been unsuccessful in purchasing uncut heroin for him on the street. To Harrison's frustration, Dylan was having severe doubts about performing in such a big-event atmosphere and still would not commit to playing. "Look, it's not my scene, either," Harrison countered. "At least you've played on your own in front of a crowd before. I've never done that."

Through Harrison's friendship with the Band, Jonathan Taplin served as production manager, while Chip Monck was in charge of lighting. Gary Kellgren from the nearby Record Plant was brought in to record the concerts, overseen by Spector, and "Klein's people", led by director Saul Swimmer, would handle the filming of the event. The official concert photographers were Tom Wilkes and Barry Feinstein, the pair responsible for the artwork on Harrison's acclaimed 1970 triple album, All Things Must Pass. (Note: Wilkes also designed the picture sleeve for the "Bangla Desh" single, the front of which consisted of a collage of newspaper headlines relating to Bangladesh's thwarted efforts to gain international recognition.)

Stephen Stills, having proceeded to sell out Madison Square Garden two days before the concert on 30 July, in support of his album, Stephen Stills 2, allowed Harrison to use his stage, sound, lighting system and production manager but was upset when Harrison "neglected to invite him to perform, mention his name, or say thank you". Stills then spent the show drunk in Ringo Starr's dressing room, "barking at everyone".

== Concert programme ==
=== Afternoon show ===
Excluding brief support roles in December 1969 for both Delaney & Bonnie and Friends and Lennon's Plastic Ono Band, the Concert for Bangladesh was Harrison's first live appearance before a paying audience since the Beatles had quit touring in 1966. (Note: In his interview for Martin Scorsese's 2011 documentary Living in the Material World, Klaus Voormann talks about the magnitude of Harrison's ordeal that day, facing the first full house of 20,000 concert-goers: "He actually went up there and talked to an audience – I think that must've been about the first time he's ever done this ... he knew it's going to be filmed, it's going to be used. To talk to an audience, it's very, very difficult ...") Dylan had quit touring that same year, although he had made a moderately successful comeback in August 1969 at the Isle of Wight Festival, his most recent live performance at this point. In 2005, Rolling Stone founder Jann Wenner compared the "buzz" preceding the first Concert for Bangladesh show to the excitement in New York during the Beatles' 1966 visit.

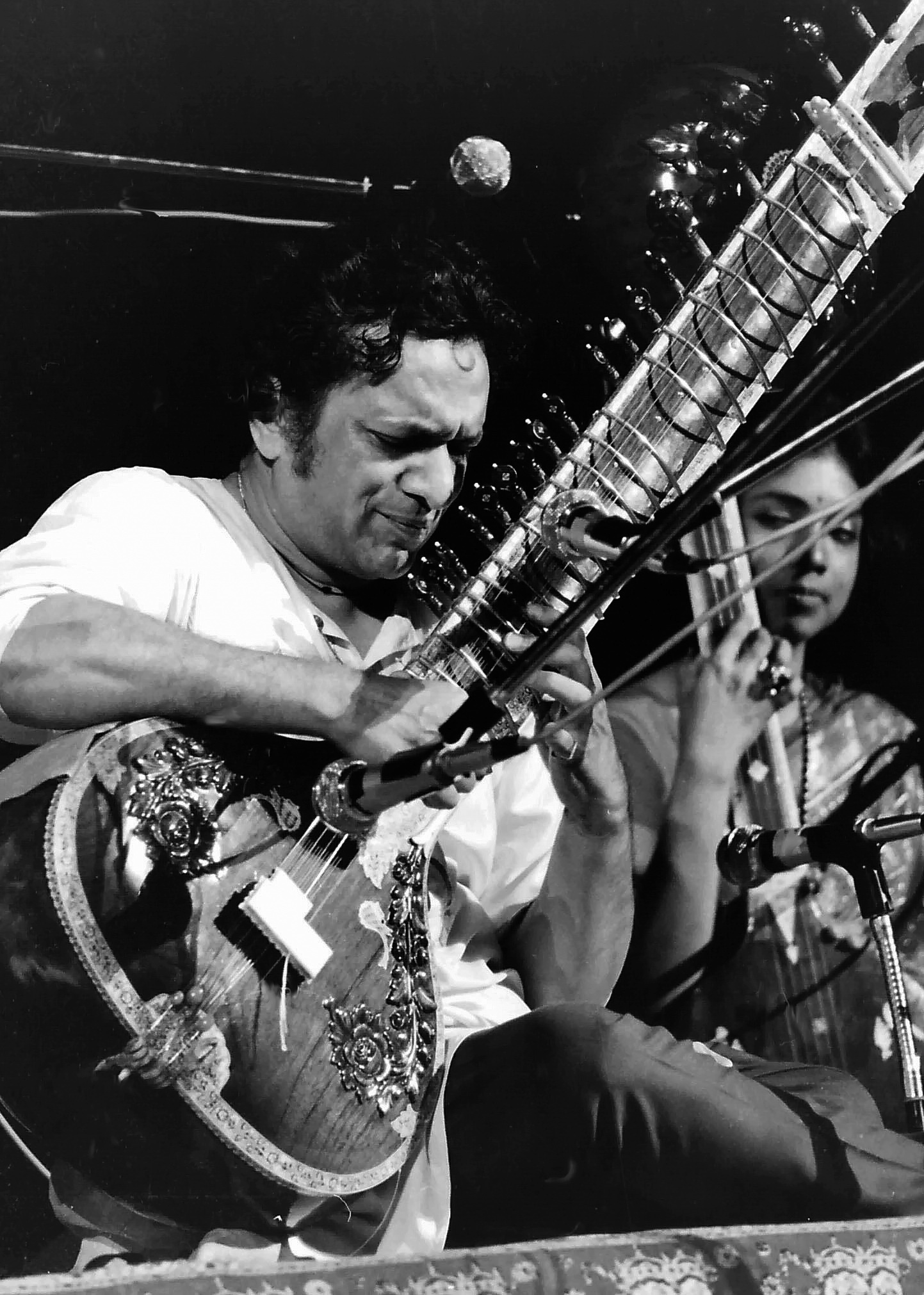
Ravi Shankar (pictured in 1969)

In his role as master of ceremonies, Harrison began the afternoon show by asking the audience to "try to get into" the opening, Indian music portion of the programme. He then introduced Ravi Shankar and the latter's fellow musicians – sarodya Ali Akbar Khan, tabla player Alla Rakha, and Kamala Chakravarty on tamboura. Shankar first explained the reason for the concerts, after which the four musicians performed a traditional dhun, in the format of a khyal rather than a standard raga, titled "Bangla Dhun". Their set included a second piece, authors Chip Madinger and Mark Easter suggest, citing Harrison's own description that each show's Indian music segment lasted for three-quarters of an hour, whereas only seventeen minutes of music appears on the Concert for Bangladesh live album. (Note: Similarly, in his concert review for The New York Times, Mike Jahn wrote of "two selections of Indian music" performed by Shankar and Khan: "an afternoon raga and a composition".) The recital was afforded a "fidgety respect" from fans eager to discover the identity of Harrison's advertised "Friends", although the audience's goodwill was more than evident. A short intermission ensued while the stage was cleared and a Dutch TV film was shown, displaying footage of the atrocities and natural tragedies taking place in former East Pakistan.

It was magical. That's the only way to describe it, because nobody had ever seen anything like that before, that amount of star power ... all in two hours onstage at one time.

— Phil Spector, 2011

To thunderous applause from the New York crowd, Harrison appeared on stage along with his temporary band, comprising Ringo Starr, a very sick Eric Clapton, Leon Russell, Billy Preston, Klaus Voormann, Jim Keltner and eighteen others. Backed by this "full Phil Spector/All Things Must Pass rock orchestra", Harrison began the Western portion of the concert with "Wah-Wah", followed by his Beatles hit song' "Something" and the gospel-rocker "Awaiting on You All". Harrison then handed the spotlight over to Preston, who performed his only sizeable hit (thus far), "That's the Way God Planned It", followed by Starr, whose song "It Don't Come Easy" had recently established the drummer as a solo artist. (Note: Beatles authors note that "It Don't Come Easy" outperformed singles by Starr's former bandmates during this period – namely, Lennon's "Power to the People", Harrison's "Bangla Desh" and McCartney's "Another Day" and "The Back Seat of My Car". Like "That's the Way God Planned It", Starr's hit song was originally produced by Harrison in London.) Nicholas Schaffner was in the audience for this first show and later described Starr's turn as having received the "biggest ovation" of the afternoon.

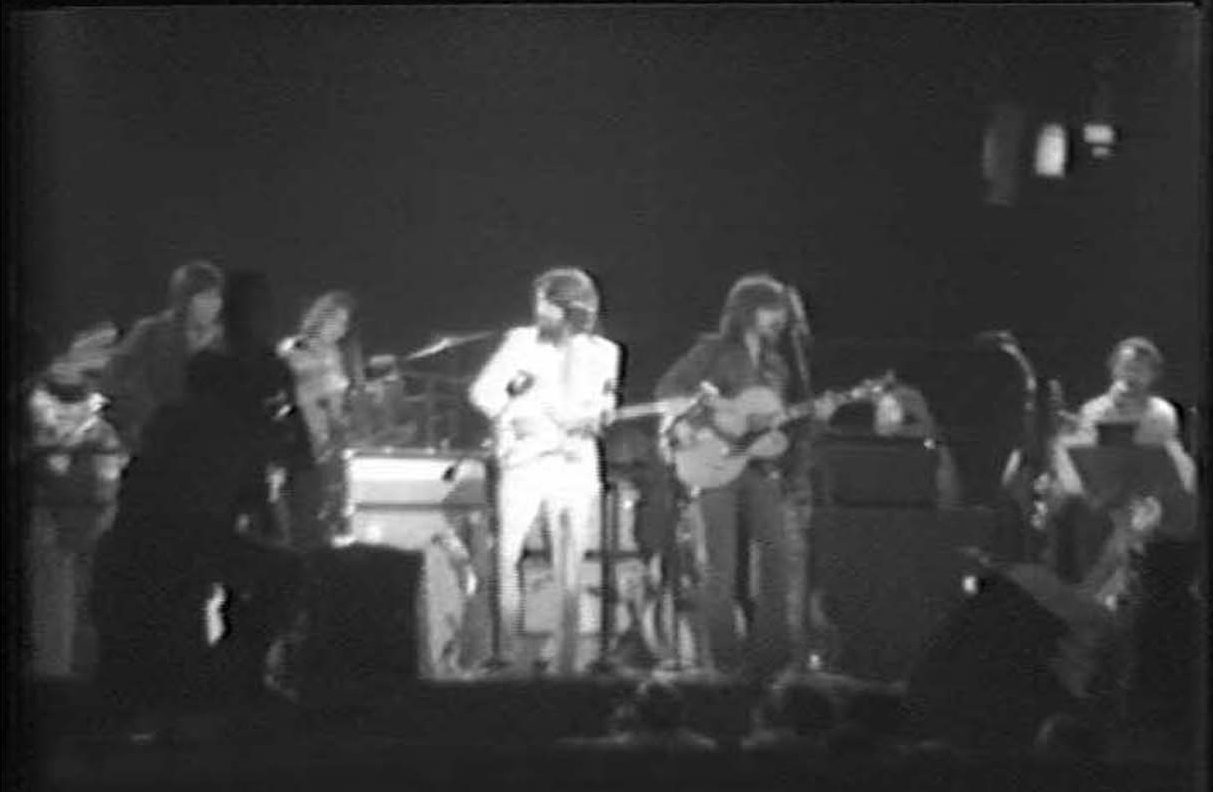
Scene from the concert

Next up was Harrison's "Beware of Darkness", with guest vocals on the third verse by Russell, who covered the song on his concurrent album, Leon Russell and the Shelter People (1971). After pausing to introduce the band, Harrison followed this with one of the best-received moments in both the shows – a charging version of the White Album track "While My Guitar Gently Weeps", featuring him and Clapton "duelling" on lead guitar during the long instrumental playout. Both the band introduction and "While My Guitar Gently Weeps" are among the few selections from the afternoon show that were included on the album and in the film. Another one was Leon Russell's medley of the Rolling Stones' "Jumpin' Jack Flash" and the Coasters' "Young Blood", which was also a highlight of Russell's live shows at the time. With Don Preston crossing the stage to play lead guitar with Harrison, there were now temporarily four electric guitarists in the line-up. Don Preston, Harrison and Claudia Lennear supplied supporting vocals behind Russell.

In an effective change of pace, Harrison picked up his acoustic guitar, now alone on the stage save for Pete Ham on a second acoustic, and Don Nix's gospel choir, off to stage-left. The ensuing "Here Comes the Sun" – the first live performance of the song – was also warmly received. (Note: In a subsequent interview, Ham stated that Harrison only approached him about performing "Here Comes the Sun" the day before the concerts, and that the two guitarists never rehearsed the song together.) At this point, Harrison switched back to his white Fender Stratocaster electric guitar and, as recounted to Anthony DeCurtis in 1987, he looked down at the setlist taped to the body of the guitar and saw the word "Bob" followed by a question mark. "And I looked around," Harrison recalled of Bob Dylan's entrance, "and he was so nervous – he had his guitar on and his shades – he was sort of coming on, coming [pumps his arms and shoulders] ... It was only at that moment that I knew for sure he was going to do it." Among the audience, Schaffner wrote, there was "total astonishment" at this new arrival.

As Harrison had envisaged, Dylan's mini-set was the crowning glory of the Concert for Bangladesh for many observers. Backed by just Harrison, Russell (now playing Voormann's Fender Precision bass) and Starr on tambourine, Dylan played five of his decade-defining songs from the 1960s: "A Hard Rain's A-Gonna Fall", "Blowin' in the Wind", "It Takes a Lot to Laugh, It Takes a Train to Cry", "Love Minus Zero/No Limit" and "Just Like a Woman".

Harrison and the band then returned to perform a final segment, consisting of "Hear Me Lord" and his recent international number one hit, "My Sweet Lord", followed by the song of the moment – "Bangla Desh".

=== Evening show ===
Harrison was reportedly delighted with the outcome of the first show, as was Dylan, who accompanied him back to the Park Lane Hotel afterwards. They discussed possible changes to the setlist for the evening performance, beginning at 8 pm.

The songs played and their sequence differed slightly between the first and second shows, most noticeably with Harrison's opening and closing mini-sets. After "Wah-Wah", he brought "My Sweet Lord" forward in the order, followed by "Awaiting on You All", before handing it over to Billy Preston. The afternoon's "creaky" "Hear Me Lord" was dropped, so that the post-Dylan band segment consisted of only two numbers: "Something", to close the show, and a particularly passionate reading of "Bangla Desh", as an encore. Dylan likewise made some changes, swapping "Blowin' in the Wind" and "It Takes a Lot to Laugh" in the order, and then playing a well-received "Mr. Tambourine Man" in place of "Love Minus Zero".

The second show was widely acknowledged as superior to the afternoon performance, although Village Voice reviewer Don Heckman noted that many in the audience reacted to the Shankar–Khan opening set with a lack of respect. Not aiding the Indian musicians was the failure of a microphone on Rakha's hand drums, Heckman observed, so denying the crowd a vital element of the musical interplay between sitar and sarod.

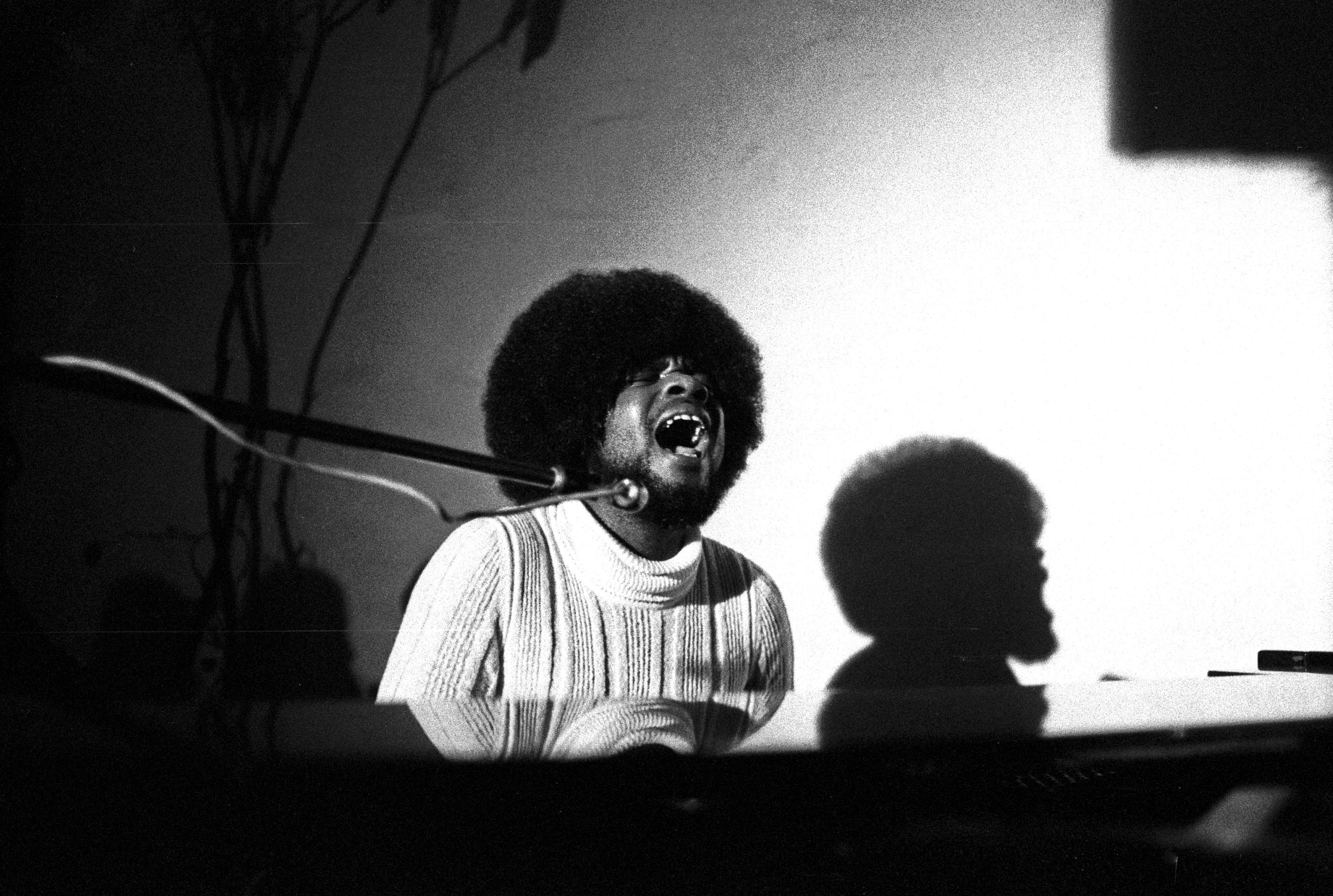
Billy Preston, pictured in 1971

During the Western portion of the show, Harrison's voice was more confident this time around, the music "perhaps slightly more lustrous", according to Rolling Stone. Towards the end of "That's the Way God Planned It", Preston felt compelled to get up from behind his Hammond organ and take a show-stealing boogie across the front of the stage.

Dylan's walk-on was again the show's "real cortex-snapping moment", Heckman opined. Dylan finished his final song, "Just Like a Woman", with a victorious salute – "holding up both fists like a strongman", Rolling Stone's reviewer remarked shortly afterwards. Following Dylan's set, Harrison introduced the band, before taking the show "to yet another peak" with "Something". Watching from the wings, Pattie Harrison described her husband's performance throughout that evening as "magnificent".

What happened is now history: it was one of the most moving and intense musical experiences of the century.

— Ravi Shankar, 2005

Following the two sellout concerts, all the participants attended a celebratory party in a basement club known as Ungano's. Dylan was so elated, Harrison recalled 16 years later, "He picked me up and hugged me and he said, 'God! If only we'd done three shows!'" Like Harrison, the experience of playing at Madison Square that day did not lead to Dylan immediately re-embracing the concert stage; only a brief guest appearance with the Band on New Year's Eve 1971–72 and sitting in during a John Prine club gig eventuated before he returned to touring in January 1974. (Note: Dylan made a brief return to writing protest songs, however, for the first time since 1963–64, with the non-album single "George Jackson". He recorded this song in New York in November 1971, again with Russell.)

The post-concert party featured live performances from Harrison and Preston, after which a "roaring drunk" Phil Spector played a "unique" version of "Da Doo Ron Ron". The celebrations broke up in the early hours once Keith Moon of the Who began smashing up the drum kit, which actually belonged to Badfinger's Mike Gibbins.

== Reviews ==
Harrison's manager, Allen Klein, immediately boasted of the entirely peaceful nature of the event: "There was no rioting. Not one policeman was allowed in there ... Zero!" In fact, as reported in The Village Voice on 12 August, midway through the evening show, a crowd of 200 non-ticket-holders charged and broke through the doors of Madison Square Garden. (Note: A force of 100 security guards and New York City police then clubbed the crowd, during which counterculture figure Wavy Gravy, who was seriously ill, was allegedly hit from behind after showing the officers that he did indeed have a valid ticket.) Aside from this episode, press reports concerning the Concert for Bangladesh shows were overwhelmingly positive.

The appearance of Bob Dylan on the same stage as two former Beatles caused a sensation, and lavish praise was bestowed on George Harrison. "Beatlemania Sweeps a City!" was a typical headline, and in Britain the NME declared the concerts "The Greatest Rock Spectacle of the Decade!" Billboard described the artists' performances as "their best music ever" and commented on the likelihood of a live album from the concerts: "there is no politics involved. What is involved is starving children and for once, relief through 35 musicians who should represent the feeling of anyone who loves their music."

Dylan's choice of songs, particularly the "apocalyptic" "A Hard Rain's A-Gonna Fall", was found to have a new relevance in the context of the early 1970s – the words made "the more chilling for the passage of years", opined Rolling Stone. The same publication stated of Starr's contribution: "Seeing Ringo Starr drumming and singing on stage has a joy in it that is one of the happiest feelings on earth still." Ravi Shankar's role as concert instigator and the true conscience of the UNICEF shows was also noted. Musically, The Village Voice observed, the pairing of Shankar and Ali Akbar Khan was "almost as unique as the mix of Dylan and Harrison".

In the wider countercultural context of the time, with disillusion increasingly rife with each post-Woodstock rock event, commentators viewed the concerts as, in the words of Rolling Stone, "a brief incandescent revival of all that was best about the Sixties". Writing in 1981, NME critic Bob Woffinden likened it to a "rediscovery of faith", adding: "Harrison had put rock music back on course."

Among Harrison's biographers, Alan Clayson describes the 1971–72 period covering the concerts and their associated releases as "the George Harrison Moment", while Gary Tillery states: "The Concert for Bangladesh sealed Harrison's stature as something more than just a major celebrity ... He changed the perception of recording artists, making it clear they could be good world citizens too – willing to set aside their egos and paychecks in order to help people who were suffering." According to Niaz Alam, writing in the Dhaka Tribune, "On artistic merit alone, as encapsulated in the film and LP, the Concert for Bangladesh perhaps holds up better than Woodstock in showcasing the best of its era in terms of music, optimism, and goodwill."

== Aftermath ==
The money we raised was secondary. The main thing was, we spread the word and helped get the war ended ... What we did show was that musicians and people are more humane than politicians.

— George Harrison, 1992

Politically, as Bangladeshi historian Farida Majid would note, the "warmth, care and goodwill" of the August 1971 concerts "echoed all over the world", inspiring volunteers to approach UNICEF and offer their assistance, as well as eliciting private donations to the Bangladesh disaster fund. Although the altruistic spirit would soon wane once more, the Concert for Bangladesh is invariably seen as the inspiration and model for subsequent rock charity benefits, from 1985's Live Aid and Farm Aid to the Concert for New York City and Live 8 in the twenty-first century. Unlike those later concerts, which benefitted from continuous media coverage of the causes they supported, the Harrison–Shankar project was responsible for identifying the problem and establishing Bangladesh's plight in the minds of mainstream Western society. According to Gary Tillery: "Because of its positioning as a humanitarian effort, all descriptions of the show included a summary of the catastrophe in South Asia. Overnight, because of their fascination with rock stars, masses of people became educated about geopolitical events they had not even been aware of the week before. The tragedy in Bangladesh moved to the fore as an international issue." One of these revelations was that America was supplying weaponry and financial aid to the Pakistani army, led by General Yahya Khan.

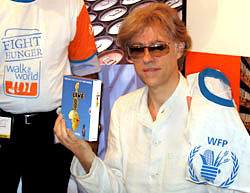
Bob Geldof (pictured at a promotional event for Live 8) acknowledged the Concert for Bangladesh as his inspiration for staging Live Aid in 1985.

Harrison's musical biographer, Simon Leng, identifies friendship as the key factor behind the success of the two UNICEF shows, both in bringing all the participants together on the stage and in the affection with which the audience and music critics viewed the event. Klaus Voormann, a close friend of Harrison's since 1960, has often cited this quality as well.

Friendship played out through the next, significantly more lucrative stages of the Bangladesh relief project, as the associated live album and concert film were prepared for release. Harrison had assured all the main performers that their appearance would be removed from these releases if the event turned out "lousy", to save anyone having to risk possible embarrassment. Having sent out personalised letters of thanks to all the participants on 1 September, he expressed his gratitude further by guesting on Billy Preston's first album on A&M Records that autumn and donating a new song to Jesse Ed Davis.

Around the same time, there were rumours of a possible repeat of the New York concerts, to be held at London's Wembley Stadium in early October. Harrison and Klein quashed the idea, but an English version of the Concert for Bangladesh did take place, at The Oval in south London on 18 September. Titled "Goodbye to Summer – a rock concert in aid of famine relief of Bangla Desh", it included performances by the Who, the Faces, Mott the Hoople, America, Lindisfarne and Quintessence. (Note: The event attracted close to 40,000 fans and raised £15,000 for the cause.) Bangladesh refugees were also one of several charitable causes supported at the Weeley Festival, held near Clacton-on-Sea in Essex in late August. On 22 September, George and Pattie Harrison arrived home in the UK, with mixing having been completed on the upcoming live album, and Harrison due to meet with Patrick Jenkin of the British Treasury, to deal with the unforeseen obstacle of purchase tax being levied on the album. This was one of a number of problems that hindered Harrison's Bangladesh project following the Madison Square Garden shows, and the British politician would allegedly tell him: "Sorry! It is all very well for your high ideals, but Britain equally needs the money!" (Note: An Australian version of the Concert for Bangladesh was held at the Myer Music Bowl in Melbourne on 20 April 1975. The acts included Daddy Cool, Ayers Rock, Phil Manning and AC/DC.)

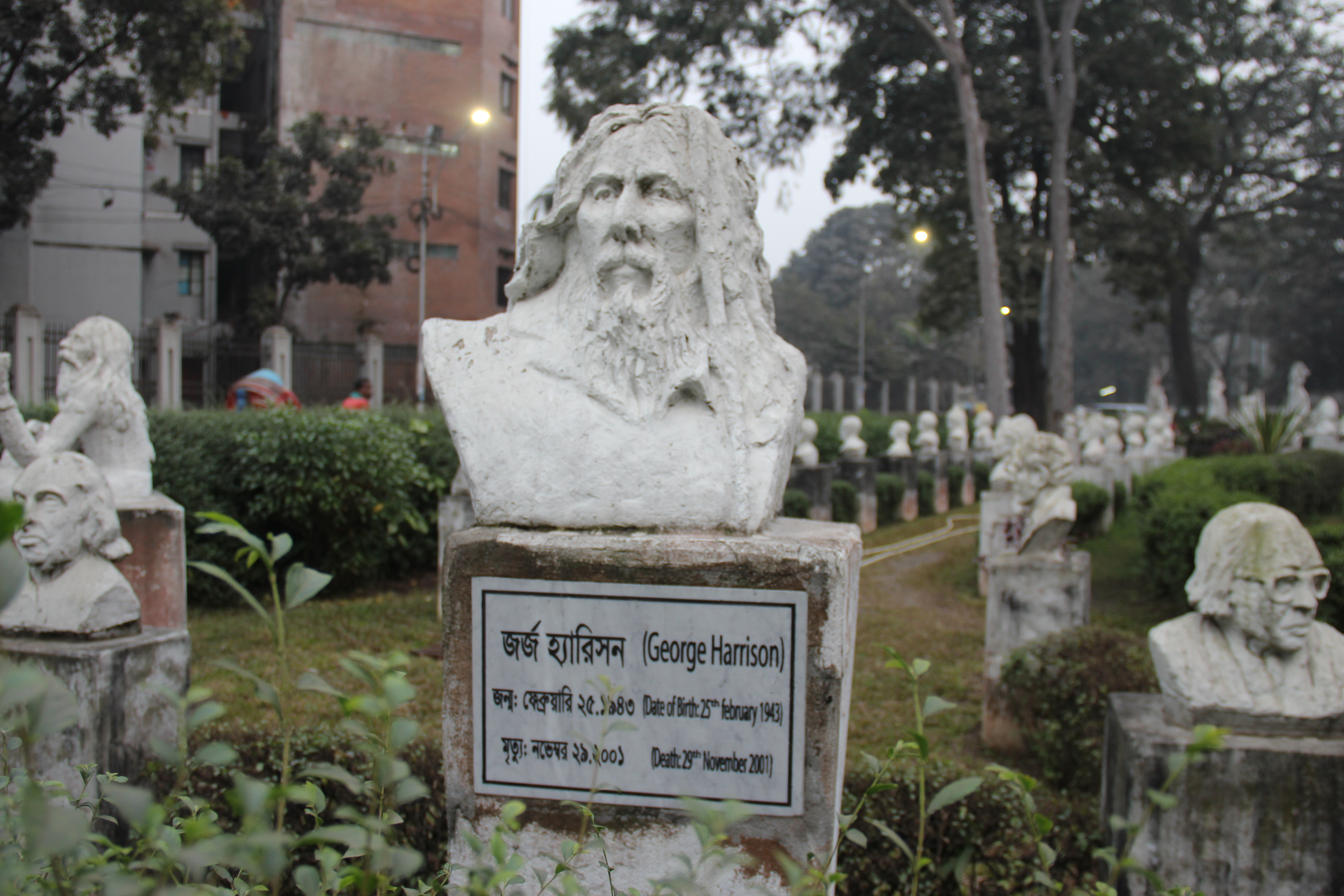
George Harrison sculpture in Dhaka, Bangladesh

On 5 June 1972, in recognition of their "pioneering" fundraising efforts for the refugees of Bangladesh, George Harrison, Ravi Shankar and Allen Klein were jointly honoured by UNICEF with its "Child Is the Father of the Man" award. In December 2008, seven years after Harrison's death, the BBC reported that moves were under way in the Bangladeshi High Court to have Harrison officially recognised and honoured as a hero for his role during the troubled birth of the nation.

Writing in 2003, author Bill Harry bemoaned the lack of recognition afforded Harrison in the UK honours system for his staging of the Concert for Bangladesh. Harry said that, given the influence of the event and Harrison's other charitable activities, and also how his company HandMade Films "virtually revived the British film industry", it was "difficult to equate" his MBE status (which he gained in 1965 as a member of the Beatles) with the knighthoods or other higher orders lavished on the likes of Bob Geldof, comedians, pop stars and other figures in the music business. (Note: Geoffrey Cannon, in a 2019 update accompanying the re-publication at Rock's Backpages of his 1972 Guardian review of the Concert for Bangladesh live album, said this lack of state recognition for Harrison was "inexplicable", given that McCartney was knighted in 1997 and Shankar was awarded the Indian equivalent in 2001.)

== Funds and controversy ==
The two Madison Square Garden shows raised US$243,418.50, which was given to UNICEF to administer on 12 August 1971. By December, Capitol Records presented a cheque to Apple Corps for around $3,750,000 for advance sales of the Concert for Bangladesh live album.

Aside from complaints regarding the high retail price for the three-record set, particularly in Britain – a result of the government's refusal to waive its tax surcharge – controversy soon surrounded the project's fundraising. Most importantly, Klein had failed to register the event as a UNICEF benefit beforehand, and it was subsequently denied tax-exempt status by the US Government. As a result, most of the money was held in an Internal Revenue Service escrow account for ten years. In an interview with Derek Taylor for his autobiography in the late 1970s, Harrison put this figure at between $8 million and $10 million. Before then, in early 1972, New York magazine reported that some of the proceeds remained unaccounted for and had found their way into Klein's accounts. Klein responded by suing the magazine for $150 million in damages, and although the suit was later withdrawn, the accusations attracted unwelcome scrutiny at a time when questions were also being asked about Klein's mismanagement of the Beatles' finances. That year, an estimated $2 million had gone to the refugees via UNICEF before the IRS audit of Apple got under way; finally, in 1981, $8.8 million was added to that total following the audit. (Note: Klein's handling of the Bangladesh project, and the suspicion of financial impropriety on his part, was one of the main reasons that Harrison, Lennon and Starr chose not to renew his management contract in March 1973. In their lawsuit against Klein in November that year, they cited his failure to prearrange official charity status for the event, among several other complaints.)

By June 1985, according to an article in the Los Angeles Times, nearly $12 million had been sent to Bangladesh for relief. Around this time, according to music journalist Mikal Gilmore, Harrison gave Geldof "meticulous advice" to ensure that Live Aid's estimated £50 million found its way, as intended, to victims of the Ethiopian famine. In an interview to promote the 1991 CD release of The Concert for Bangladesh, Harrison said that $13.5 million had been raised in the early 1970s, from the concert and the accompanying album and film. He added that, while this figure paled in comparison to ventures such as Live Aid, "you have to remember, that was at a time when nobody was really aware of this kind of benefit concert, certainly there hadn't been anything like that, and, of course, $13.5 million back then was probably much more than it's worth now."

Speaking in the 1990s, Harrison said of the Bangladesh relief effort: "Now it's all settled and the UN own the rights to it themselves, and I think there's been about 45 million dollars made." Sales of the DVD and CD of the 1971 Concert for Bangladesh continue to benefit the cause, now known as the George Harrison Fund for UNICEF.

== See also ==
- List of highest-grossing benefit concerts

== Sources ==
- Keith Badman, The Beatles Diary Volume 2: After the Break-Up 1970–2001, Omnibus Press (London, 2001; ISBN 0-7119-8307-0).
- Roy Carr & Tony Tyler, The Beatles: An Illustrated Record, Trewin Copplestone Publishing (London, 1978; ISBN 0-450-04170-0).
- Harry Castleman & Walter J. Podrazik, All Together Now: The First Complete Beatles Discography 1961–1975, Ballantine Books (New York, NY, 1976; ISBN 0-345-25680-8).
- Alan Clayson, George Harrison, Sanctuary (London, 2003; ISBN 1-86074-489-3).
- The Concert for Bangladesh Revisited with George Harrison and Friends DVD, Apple Corps, 2005 (directed by Claire Ferguson; produced by Olivia Harrison, Jonathan Clyde & Jo Human).
- Peter Doggett, You Never Give Me Your Money: The Beatles After the Breakup, It Books (New York, NY, 2011; ISBN 978-0-06-177418-8).
- The Editors of Rolling Stone, Harrison, Rolling Stone Press/Simon & Schuster (New York, NY, 2002; ISBN 0-7432-3581-9).
- Joshua M. Greene, Here Comes the Sun: The Spiritual and Musical Journey of George Harrison, John Wiley & Sons (Hoboken, NJ, 2006; ISBN 978-0-470-12780-3).
- George Harrison, I Me Mine, Chronicle Books (San Francisco, CA, 2002; ISBN 0-8118-3793-9).
- Olivia Harrison, George Harrison: Living in the Material World, Abrams (New York, NY, 2011; ISBN 978-1-4197-0220-4).
- Bill Harry, The George Harrison Encyclopedia, Virgin Books (London, 2003; ISBN 978-0753508220).
- Clinton Heylin, Bob Dylan: Behind the Shades (20th Anniversary Edition), Faber and Faber (London, 2011; ISBN 978-0-571-27240-2).
- Elliot J. Huntley, Mystical One: George Harrison – After the Break-up of the Beatles, Guernica Editions (Toronto, ON, 2006; ISBN 1-55071-197-0).
- Chris Ingham, The Rough Guide to the Beatles, Rough Guides/Penguin (London, 2006; 2nd edn; ISBN 978-1-84836-525-4).
- Peter Lavezzoli, The Dawn of Indian Music in the West, Continuum (New York, NY, 2006; ISBN 0-8264-2819-3).
- Simon Leng, While My Guitar Gently Weeps: The Music of George Harrison, Hal Leonard (Milwaukee, WI, 2006; ISBN 1-4234-0609-5).
- Chip Madinger & Mark Easter, Eight Arms to Hold You: The Solo Beatles Compendium, 44.1 Productions (Chesterfield, MO, 2000; ISBN 0-615-11724-4).
- Dan Matovina, Without You: The Tragic Story of Badfinger, Frances Glover Books (2000; ISBN 0-9657122-2-2).
- Chris O'Dell with Katherine Ketcham, Miss O'Dell: My Hard Days and Long Nights with The Beatles, The Stones, Bob Dylan, Eric Clapton, and the Women They Loved, Touchstone (New York, NY, 2009; ISBN 978-1-4165-9093-4).
- Ray Richmond & Antonia Coffman (eds), The Simpsons: A Complete Guide to Our Favorite Family, HarperPerennial (New York, NY, 1997; ISBN 978-0-00-638898-2).
- Robert Rodriguez, Fab Four FAQ 2.0: The Beatles' Solo Years, 1970–1980, Backbeat Books (Milwaukee, WI, 2010; ISBN 978-1-4165-9093-4).
- Nicholas Schaffner, The Beatles Forever, McGraw-Hill (New York, NY, 1978; ISBN 0-07-055087-5).
- Stan Soocher, Baby You're a Rich Man: Suing the Beatles for Fun and Profit, University Press of New England (Lebanon, NH, 2015; ISBN 978-1-61168-380-6).
- Howard Sounes, Down the Highway: The Life of Bob Dylan, Doubleday (London, 2001; ISBN 0-385-60125-5).
- Bruce Spizer, The Beatles Solo on Apple Records, 498 Productions (New Orleans, LA, 2005; ISBN 0-9662649-5-9).
- Gary Tillery, Working Class Mystic: A Spiritual Biography of George Harrison, Quest Books (Wheaton, IL, 2011; ISBN 978-0-8356-0900-5).
- Bob Woffinden, The Beatles Apart, Proteus (London, 1981; ISBN 0-906071-89-5).
