= No Dice =

Studio album by Badfinger
- Released: 9 November 1970
- Recorded: 20 April – 26 August 1970
- Studio: EMI and Trident in London
- Genre: Power pop
- Length: 40:00
- Label: Apple
- Producer: Geoff Emerick, Mal Evans

Badfinger chronology
Magic Christian Music (1970)	No Dice (1970)	Straight Up (1971)

Singles from No Dice
- 1. "No Matter What" Released: 12 October 1970

No Dice is the third studio album by the Welsh rock band Badfinger, issued by Apple Records and released on 9 November 1970. Their second album under the Badfinger name, but their first official album under that name, and first to include guitarist Joey Molland, No Dice significantly expanded the British group's popularity, especially abroad. The album included both the hit single "No Matter What" and the song "Without You", which would become a big hit for Harry Nilsson, and later a hit for Mariah Carey.

== Background ==
Although this was the band's second album released under the Badfinger name, the previous album, Magic Christian Music, was originally recorded as The Iveys but released as Badfinger. It was the band's first album recorded after new guitarist Joey Molland joined the group, replacing bassist Ron Griffiths, but Molland's addition caused Tom Evans to switch from rhythm guitar to bass. Badfinger would release five albums, generally their most successful recordings, with this line-up.

The model depicted on the album cover has never been formally identified. According to Molland, "the woman was a model hired by Gene Mahon and Richard DiLello for the shoot, they designed the cover, [and] we never actually met her." When he asked DiLello about her "at a Beatlefest in the 70s," DiLello gave her name as Kathy. (Molland's own wife, Kathie, also worked as a model.)

== Release ==
No Dice peaked at number 28 on the Billboard Top LPs chart. Widely praised in music reviews at the time, Rolling Stone magazine opined that it represented what the Beatles would have sounded like had they retained their initial formula.

The single from this LP, "No Matter What", peaked in the United States at number 8 on the Billboard Hot 100 chart in 1970. The song is often regarded as an early offering in the power pop genre. The album also contains the original version of "Without You". Although Badfinger did not release the song as a single in Europe or North America, it was taken to number 1 on the Billboard charts in 1972 by Harry Nilsson, and became a hit for Mariah Carey in 1994. "Without You" has been the top money-earner for Badfinger in publishing royalties, having been covered by over 200 artists. The song was also picked to provide the title for Dan Matovina's 1997 biography Without You: The Tragic Story Of Badfinger.

In October 1991, No Dice was digitally remastered at Abbey Road Studio by Ron Furmanek. The remastered album was released in 1992 by Capitol Records and Apple, with five previously unreleased bonus tracks. Of the bonus tracks, "Friends Are Hard to Find" was an outtake from the same Mal Evans-produced session that saw the recording of "No Matter What" and "Believe Me". "Get Down" was originally attempted with Evans, but the version here was recorded with Geoff Emerick. The three remaining tracks, "Mean, Mean Jemima", "Loving You", and "I'll Be the One", were recorded with Emerick between January and March 1971 (after the completion of No Dice) for the intended follow-up album that was never released.

== Critical reception ==
Retrospective professional reviews
Review scores
Source	Rating
AllMusic	4.5/5 stars
Christgau's Record Guide	B
Encyclopedia of Popular Music	4/5 stars
The Great Rock Discography	7/10
Mojo	4/5 stars
MusicHound Rock	5/5
The Rolling Stone Album Guide	3/5 stars
Tom Hull	B
Uncut	3/5 stars

Reviewing for Creem in 1971, Mike Saunders wrote effusively about the album and the band itself: "Badfinger is one of the best songwriting groups around, one of the best singing groups anywhere, and now with an absolutely great lead guitarist in Pete Ham, they're really one fucking whale of a group." Robert Christgau was somewhat less enthusiastic, writing in Christgau's Record Guide: Rock Albums of the Seventies (1981): "I don't think these guys imitate the Beatles just so Paul will give them more hits — they've got hits of their own. But from the guitar parts (play 'Better Days' right after 'I Feel Fine') and harmonies (the Paul of 'I've Just Seen a Face' atop the Paul of 'Long Tall Sally') to concept and lineup, an imitation is what this is, modernized slightly via some relaxed countrification. They write almost well enough to get away with it, too. But somehow the song that stands out is 'Blodwyn,' a simulated (I think) English folk ditty about a swain and a spoon that has nothing to do with the Fab Four at all."

== Track listing ==
1970 LP: Side one
No.	Title	Length
1.	"I Can't Take It" (Pete Ham)	2:57
2.	"I Don't Mind" (Tom Evans/Joey Molland)	3:15
3.	"Love Me Do" (Molland)	3:00
4.	"Midnight Caller" (Ham)	2:50
5.	"No Matter What" (Ham)	3:01
6.	"Without You" (Ham/Evans)	4:43

1970 LP: Side two
No.	Title	Length
1.	"Blodwyn" (Ham)	3:26
2.	"Better Days" (Evans/Molland)	4:01
3.	"It Had to Be" (Mike Gibbins)	2:29
4.	"Watford John" (Evans/Gibbins/Ham/Molland)	3:23
5.	"Believe Me" (Evans)	3:01
6.	"We're for the Dark" (Ham)	3:55

- Sides one and two were combined as tracks 1–12 on CD reissues.

1992 CD bonus tracks
No.	Title	Length
13.	"Get Down" (Evans/Gibbins/Ham/Molland)	3:43
14.	"Friends Are Hard to Find" (Molland)	2:28
15.	"Mean Mean Jemima" (Molland)	3:41
16.	"Loving You" (Gibbins)	2:51
17.	"I'll Be the One" (Evans/Gibbins/Ham/Molland)	2:54

2010 CD bonus tracks

13. "I Can't Take It (Extended Version)" (Ham) – 4:14
14. "Without You"(Mono Studio Demo Version) (Ham, Evans) – 3:57
15. "Photograph (Friends are Hard to Find)" (Molland) – 3:24
16. "Believe Me" (Alternate Version) (Evans) – 3:04
17. "No Matter What" (Mono Studio Demo Version) (Ham) – 2:57

2010 digital bonus tracks

18. "Love Me Do" (Instrumental Version) – 2:57
19. "Get Down" (Alternate Version) – 5:13

== Personnel ==
Badfinger

- Pete Ham – vocals, lead and rhythm guitars, piano, tack piano on "Midnight Caller", Fender Rhodes electric piano on "Without You"
- Tom Evans – vocals, bass guitar
- Joey Molland – vocals, rhythm and lead guitars
- Mike Gibbins – drums, backing vocals on "It Had To Be", lead vocals on "Loving You"

Additional personnel

- Geoff Emerick – producer
- Mal Evans – producer
- Mike Jarrett – mixing
- John Kurlander – engineer
- Richard Lush – engineer
- Keith Hodgson - additional session musician
- Steve Kolanijan – liner notes, sleeve notes
- Mike Jarratt – engineer, mixing
- Marcia McGovern – pre-production
- Roberta Ballard – production manager
- Gene Mahon – design
- Richard DiLello – design, photography
- 'Kathy' - cover model
- Ron Furmanek – digital mastering, mastering, mixing (CD re-release)

== Charts ==
Chart (1970)	Peak position
US Billboard Top LPs	28
