= Baby Blue (Badfinger song) =

1972 single by Badfinger

Single by Badfinger

from the album Straight Up
- B-side: "Flying"
- Released: 6 March 1972 (US)
- Recorded: 25 & 27 September, 5 October 1971
- Studio: AIR and Morgan (London)
- Genre: Power pop; pop rock
- Length: 3:37
- Label: Apple
- Songwriter: Pete Ham
- Producer: Todd Rundgren

Badfinger singles chronology
"Day After Day" (1971)	"Baby Blue" (1972)	"Apple of My Eye" (1973)

Music video
- "Baby Blue" on YouTube

Clip
- "Breaking Bad Final Scene" on YouTube

"Baby Blue" is a song by Welsh rock band Badfinger, from their fourth studio album, Straight Up (1971). The song was written by Pete Ham, produced by Todd Rundgren, and released on Apple Records. As a single in the US in 1972, it went to No. 14.

In 2013, the song was prominently featured in the closing moments of the final episode of the American crime drama series Breaking Bad, and subsequently charted in the UK for the first time at No. 73.

== Writing and recording ==
Ham wrote the song about a woman named Dixie Armstrong, whom he had dated during Badfinger's last US tour. Guitarist Joey Molland recalled, "She came to one of the shows, they got talking and Pete really liked her. I don’t know whether they fell in love straight away, but he invited her on the road with us and she came along." Ham ultimately ended the relationship, partially as a result of Armstrong's lack of interest in Badfinger's recording and touring activities. Ham composed the song on acoustic guitar and Molland claims to have helped streamline the song's linking parts.

The song was recorded during sporadic sessions that started on 25 September 1971. It was further worked upon on 27 September before finally being completed on 6 October 1971, the final recording session for the album Straight Up. All sessions were held at George Martin's AIR Studios together with producer Todd Rundgren.

== Release ==
"Baby Blue" was released as a single in the US on 6 March 1972, in a blue-tinted picture sleeve and featuring a new mix. Because Al Steckler, the head of Apple US, felt that it needed a stronger hook in the opening, he remixed the track with engineer Eddie Kramer in February 1972, applying heavy reverb to the snare during the first verse and middle eight. It was the group's last Top 20 single, peaking at No. 14 on the Billboard Pop Singles chart. It also reached No. 18 in South Africa.

However, the chaos that was enveloping the Apple UK operation at the time was strongly evident with regard to this song. While Apple US gave the song a picture sleeve and a remix to ensure that it was a hit, Apple UK remained unaware of its commercial potential. Although the single was assigned a release number for the UK (Apple 42), and had a scheduled release date of 10 March 1972, "Baby Blue" was never actually released as a single in the UK.

== Reception ==
Upon the single release, Record World predicted that "this one should go all the way". Evening Post critic Pete Butterfield said that at the beginning of the song it "has a sort of Tamla Motown feel but it develops into a Beatleish stroller".

Allmusic critic Stewart Mason said that it may be better than the previous single from Straight Up, "Day After Day", even though it did not chart as well. Mason said, "As on 'Day After Day', an undeniable melancholy suffuses this lost love song... this time, however, the sadness is couched in one of Ham's sweetest and catchiest melodies, giving 'Baby Blue' a smiling-through-the-tears quality, particularly in the way the tune modulates upward at the chorus."

Classic Rock critic Rob Hughes rated it Badfinger's 2nd greatest song, calling it "Pete Ham's passionate ode to Dixie Armstrong". Classic Rock History critic Janey Roberts also rated it as Badfinger's third best song, calling it "beautiful". Ultimate Classic Rock critic Michael Gallucci rated it as Badfinger's fifth best song.

== Resurgence of popularity ==
In September 2013, the song experienced a resurgence of popularity when it was featured in the final moments of the final episode of the crime drama series Breaking Bad. Online streams increased in popularity immediately following the broadcast. According to Nielsen Soundscan, 5,300 downloads were purchased the night of the broadcast, and the song appeared on the Billboard Digital Songs chart at No. 32 the week ending October 19, 2013. Guitarist Joey Molland, the last surviving member of the classic line-up of Badfinger, tweeted about his excitement over the song's use in both Breaking Bad and the 2006 film The Departed. It became a top-selling song on iTunes following the broadcast. As a result, the song charted in the UK for the first time, reaching No. 73. It also charted at No. 35 in Ireland.

== Personnel ==
- Pete Ham – lead vocals, rhythm guitar
- Tom Evans – backing vocals, bass guitar
- Joey Molland – lead guitar
- Mike Gibbins – drums, percussion

== Charts ==
Chart (1972)	Peak position
Australia (Kent Music Report)	16
Canada (RPM)	7
Malaysia (Rediffusion Malaysia)	3
New Zealand (Listener)	9
South Africa (Springbok)	18
Sweden (Kvällstoppen)	14
US Billboard Hot 100	14
US Cashbox Top 100	9
US Record World Top 100	12
West Germany (Media Control)	30

Chart (2013)	Peak position
Ireland (IRMA)	35
UK Singles (The Official Charts Company)	73

== Cover versions and other uses ==
- Aimee Mann covered the song as the B-side to her 1993 single "I Should've Known".
- Singer-songwriter Barbara Manning covered the song with her band, S.F. Seals, on the 1994 album Nowhere.
- Guitarist Phil Keaggy included the song on his 1994 album Blue.
- The song was briefly featured in the 2006 movie The Departed, directed by Martin Scorsese.
- The song was also briefly used in the 2019 movie Annabelle Comes Home, which is a part of The Conjuring Universe.

== Sources ==
- Matovina, Dan (2000). Without You: The Tragic Story of Badfinger. Frances Glover Books. ISBN 0-9657122-2-2.
