= Apple of my eye =

Phrase about something/someone cherished

In English, the expression "apple of my eye" refers to something or someone that one cherishes above all others. It signifies a person who holds a special place in someone's heart. Originally, the phrase was simply an idiom referring to the pupil of the eye.

== Origin ==
Originally this term simply referred to the "aperture at the centre of the human eye", i.e. the pupil, or occasionally to the whole eyeball. The earliest appearance of the term is found in the ninth-century Old English translation of the Latin Cura pastoralis attributed to Alfred the Great.

The sense "pupil" appears to be the meaning Shakespeare used in his 1590s plays A Midsummer Night's Dream, and Love's Labor's Lost. In A Midsummer Night's Dream, the fairy character Oberon has acquired a flower that was once hit by Cupid's arrow, imbuing it with magical love-arousing properties, and drops juice of this flower into a young sleeping man's eyes, saying "Flower of this purple dye, / Hit with Cupid's archery, / Sink in apple of his eye". In Love's Labor's Lost, the character Biron/Berowne, angry at the fact that the ruse to trick the ladies has been exposed, says to the courtier Boyet "Do not you know my lady's foot by th' square, / And laugh upon the apple of her eye,".

== Use in the Bible ==
The phrase "apple of my eye" (or similar) occurs in several places in the King James Bible translation from 1611, and some subsequent translations:

- Deuteronomy 32:10: "He found him in a desert land, and in the waste howling wilderness; he led him about, he instructed him, he kept him as the apple of his eye".
- Psalm 17:8: "Keep me as the apple of the eye, hide me under the shadow of thy wings".
- Proverbs 7:2: "Keep my commandments, and live; and my law as the apple of thine eye".
- Lamentations 2:18: "Their heart cried unto the Lord, O wall of the daughter of Zion, let tears run down like a river day and night: give thyself no rest; let not the apple of thine eye cease".
- Zechariah 2:8: "For thus saith the LORD of hosts; After the glory hath he sent me unto the nations which spoiled you: for he that toucheth you toucheth the apple of his eye".

However, the "apple" usage comes from English idiom, not Biblical Hebrew. The original Hebrew for this idiom, in all but Zechariah 2:8, was 'iyshown 'ayin (אישון עין). The expression refers to the pupil, and probably simply means "dark part of the eye" (other biblical passages use 'iyshown with the meaning dark or obscure, and having nothing whatsoever to do with the eye). There is, however, a popular notion that 'iyshown is a diminutive of "man" ('iysh), so that the expression would literally mean "Little Man of the Eye"; if so, this would be consistent with a range of languages, in which the etymology of the word for pupil has this meaning.

In Zechariah 2:8, the Hebrew phrase used is bava 'ayin (בבה עין). The meaning of bava is disputed. Some sources claim "bava" comes from an unused root meaning to hollow out or something hollowed (as in a gate). This would lend to the understanding of the pupil of the eye being hollowed as in a gate. It may mean "apple"; if so, the phrase used in Zechariah 2:8 literally refers to the "apple of the eye". However, Hebrew scholars generally regard this phrase as simply referring to the "eyeball".
