= Mike Gibbins =

Welsh musician (1949–2005)

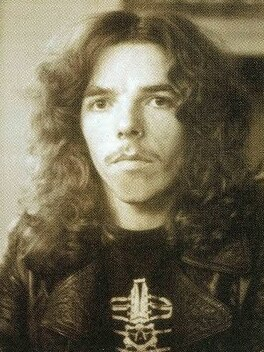
- Gibbins in 1974

Background information
- Born: Michael George Gibbins; 12 March 1949; Swansea, Wales
- Died: 4 October 2005 (aged 56) Florida, U.S.
- Genres: Rock; power pop
- Occupations: Singer; songwriter; drummer
- Instruments: Drums; percussion; vocals
- Years active: 1964–2005
- Labels: Apple; Warner Bros.; Forbidden; Exile
- Formerly of: Badfinger
- Website: www.mikegibbins.com

Michael George Gibbins (12 March 1949 – 4 October 2005) was a Welsh musician, most notable for being the drummer of Badfinger.

== The Iveys ==
Michael George Gibbins started playing drums while in the sea cadets. He played around South Wales for a time with a group called "The Misfits" before auditioning for the rival Welsh band The Iveys in 1964. The Iveys had a minor hit with "Maybe Tomorrow". In 1969, Paul McCartney produced the song "Come and Get It" for The Iveys, who prior to its release, changed their name to Badfinger and replaced Griffiths with guitarist Joey Molland.

== Badfinger ==
After the success of "Come and Get It", Badfinger enjoyed success with hit songs "No Matter What", "Day After Day", and "Baby Blue". From early on, Gibbins began to contribute songs to the albums, despite often being overshadowed by the compositions of the other members, particularly Ham. He also composed and sang the originally unreleased songs "Loving You" (from the unreleased sessions for the album Straight Up), "Rockin' Machine", and "Back Again" (from the unreleased album Head First). All of these recordings have now been issued on CD.

During his tenure with Badfinger, Gibbins - along with the other members of the band - contributed musically to the George Harrison album All Things Must Pass, and played at The Concert for Bangladesh. While working on All Things Must Pass, producer Phil Spector recognized Gibbins' talent at playing the tambourine, earning Gibbins the nickname "Mr. Tambourine Man" after the Bob Dylan song.

After Pete Ham died by suicide in 1975, Badfinger broke up and Gibbins found work as a session drummer in Wales. One of the more notable songs that Gibbins played on during this time was "It's a Heartache" by Bonnie Tyler.

After Evans and Molland split in 1982, Gibbins joined Tom Evans and Bob Jackson to create another Badfinger to rival that of Molland. Gibbins soon quit, and Evans died by suicide in 1983. A year later, Gibbins, Jackson, and Molland toured as Badfinger for a brief period.

== Later years and death ==
He recommenced touring in the late 1990s, starting his own band Madfinger which featured ex-Iveys bassist Ron Griffiths.

Gibbins released four albums later in his life, A Place in Time, More Annoying Songs, Archeology and In the Meantime featuring his own compositions.

Gibbins died from a brain aneurysm in his sleep at his Florida home on October 4, 2005, at the age of 56. He was survived by his second wife, Ellie; their sons, David and Adam; and Owen, a son from a previous marriage

Speaking of his bandmate, Molland (who was the last surviving member of Badfinger's classic line-up) said:

"I spoke to Mike on Monday afternoon. He was in good spirits and we were looking forward to seeing each other at the 'Bangladesh' re-release event on October 17. Mike and I had a falling out some time ago but we had been very much in touch with each other over the last five or six months, I'm happy to say, and we were starting to talk about the future. When we talked it was usually about the Badfinger business both past and future. He was still angry that Peter had committed suicide rather than sticking it out. Mike was a great friend to us all, a great rock drummer, father, and husband. Courageous and honest in all things, he will be sorely missed by all who knew him."

— Joey Molland
