= Joey Molland =

English composer and rock guitarist (1947–2025)

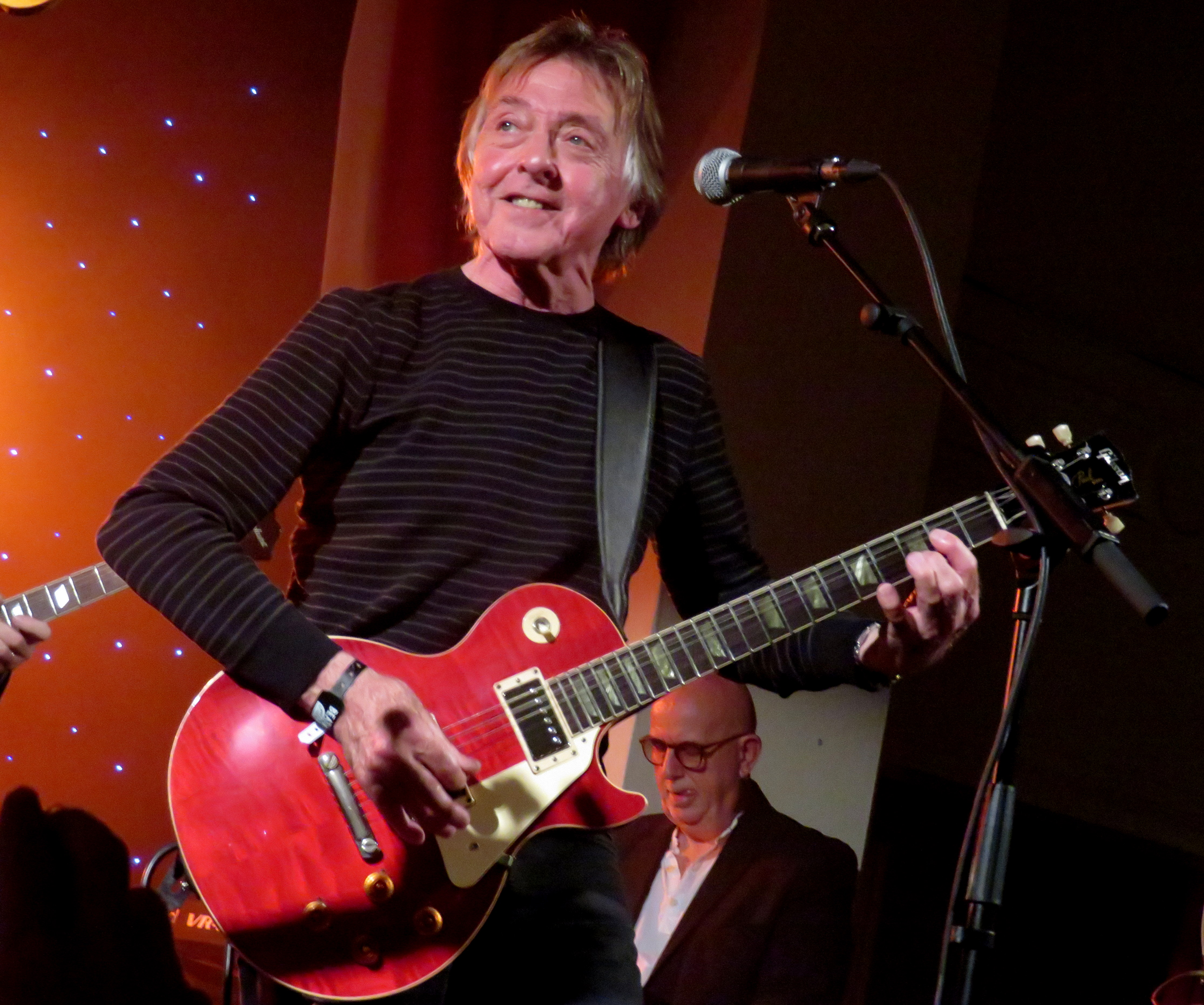
- Molland in 2018

Background information
- Born: Joseph Charles Molland; 21 June 1947; Edge Hill, Liverpool, England
- Died: 1 March 2025 (aged 77) St. Louis Park, Minnesota, U.S.
- Genres: Rock; power pop
- Occupations: Guitarist; singer-songwriter
- Instruments: Guitar; bass; keyboards; vocals
- Years active: 1965–2024
- Labels: Apple; Warner Bros. Records; Elektra; Immediate Records; Earthtone Records
- Formerly of: Badfinger
- Spouse: Kathie Wiggins (m. 1972; died 2009)

Joseph Charles Molland II (21 June 1947 – 1 March 2025) was an English singer-songwriter and guitarist whose recording career spanned five decades. He was best known as a member of Badfinger, the most successful of the acts with which he performed. Molland was the last surviving member from the band's classic line-up.

== Career ==
Molland's recording career began in earnest in 1967 when he joined Gary Walker (formerly of the Walker Brothers) for the group Gary Walker & The Rain. The band released several singles, an EP, and an album on the Polydor and Philips labels in the UK and Japan between 1967 and 1969. Titled #1, the album featured four Molland songs and was especially well received in Japan, but the band broke up in early 1969.

Molland joined Badfinger as guitarist in 1969. During Molland's association with Apple Records, he made guest appearances on two George Harrison albums, All Things Must Pass and The Concert for Bangladesh, and the 1971 John Lennon album, Imagine, including the single "Jealous Guy" released in 1985.

Molland left Badfinger in late 1974 due to disagreements over management, months before band member Pete Ham died by suicide in April 1975. Molland then joined with Jerry Shirley (formerly of Humble Pie) and formed a group called Natural Gas. The band released their self-titled album on Private Stock Records in 1976, and enjoyed a successful tour with Peter Frampton the following year. According to Molland, a general lack of organisation led to the band's demise late in 1977.

Molland and former Badfinger bandmate Tom Evans recorded two albums under the Badfinger name, Airwaves in 1979, and Say No More in 1981. He and Evans split after Say No More and the two performed in rival touring Badfinger bands until Evans's suicide in November 1983.

Molland's solo recordings were well received. His first, After The Pearl, was released in 1983 on Earthtone Records. His second, The Pilgrim, was released in 1992 on Rykodisc. His third, This Way Up, was independently released in 2001. Following the death of Mike Gibbins in October 2005, he became the last surviving member from Badfinger's classic line-up. His 2013 album, Return To Memphis, was released on 13 December.

Molland returned to the studio in 2015 with members of 10,000 Maniacs (Ladies First) to release a new version on the classic song, "Sweet Tuesday Morning" from Badfinger's 1972 album Straight Up.

In late 2019 Molland toured with Todd Rundgren, Jason Scheff, Micky Dolenz and Christopher Cross in celebration of the Beatles' self-titled double album, under the banner "It Was Fifty Years Ago Today – A Tribute to the Beatles' White Album". Molland performed the Badfinger songs "Baby Blue" and "No Matter What". He continued to tour under the name Joey Molland's Badfinger.

His last album Be True To Yourself was released by Omnivore Recordings on 12 July 2021 and featured the single "Rainy Day Man". Julian Lennon was a contributor.

== Personal life and death ==
Molland was born in Edge Hill, Liverpool on 21 June 1947. He was married to Katherine Lee "Kathie" Wiggins, who was a native of Minnesota, from 1972 until her death in 2009. They had two sons, Joey III and Shaun. At the time of his death in March 2025, Molland was in a longtime relationship with Mary Joyce.

Molland died from complications of diabetes at a hospital in St. Louis Park, Minnesota, on 1 March 2025. He was 77.

== Discography ==
With The Masterminds

- "She Belongs to Me" (1965 single)

With Gary Walker & The Rain

- Album No. 1 (1968)

With Badfinger

- No Dice (1970)
- Straight Up (1971)
- Ass (1973)
- Badfinger (1974)
- Wish You Were Here (1974)
- Airwaves (1979)
- Say No More (1981)

With Natural Gas

- Natural Gas (1976)

Solo

- After the Pearl (1983)
- The Pilgrim (1992)
- Basil (also known as "Demo's Old and New") (1997)
- This Way Up (2001)
- Return to Memphis (2013)
- Be True to Yourself (2020)

As a guest artist

- The Concert for Bangladesh (album)
- All Things Must Pass by George Harrison (album).
- Imagine by John Lennon (album)
- Victory Gardens (1991) with folk-duo John & Mary
- Wear a New Face by Tim Schools (2008 album; produced by Molland)
- Love Her by Tim Schools (2015 album; produced by Molland)

== Songs of note ==
- "I Don't Mind" (album track, No Dice co-written with Tom Evans, by Badfinger)
- "Better Days" (album track, No Dice co-written with Tom Evans, by Badfinger)
- "Watford John" (album track, No Dice co-written with Tom Evans, Mike Gibbins, Pete Ham, by Badfinger)
- "Sweet Tuesday Morning" (album track, Straight Up by Badfinger)
- "Sometimes" (album track, Straight Up by Badfinger)
- "Icicles" (album track, Ass by Badfinger)
- "I Can Love You" (album track, Ass by Badfinger)
- "Give It Up" (album track, Badfinger)
- "Andy Norris" (album track, Badfinger)
- "Meanwhile Back at the Ranch/Should I Smoke" (album track, Wish You Were Here LP, co-written with Pete Ham, by Badfinger)
- "Love Is Gonna Come at Last" (Billboard chart No. 69 by Badfinger)
- "No One Likes the Rain" (album track, The Pilgrim)
- "This Time" (album track, Be True to Yourself by Joey Molland)
