= Tom Evans (musician) =

English musician (1947–1983)

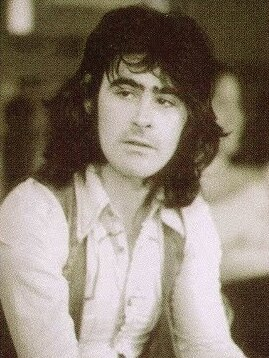
- Evans in 1974

Background information
- Born: Thomas Evans; 5 June 1947; Liverpool, England
- Died: 19 November 1983 (aged 36) London, England
- Genres: Rock; power pop
- Occupations: Musician; singer; songwriter
- Instruments: Bass guitar; vocals; guitar
- Years active: 1963–1983
- Labels: Apple; Warner Bros.; Elektra; Radio Records; Gipsy Records
- Formerly of: Badfinger
- Spouse: Marianne Evans

Thomas Evans (5 June 1947 – 19 November 1983) was an English musician, best known for his work as the bassist of the band Badfinger. He also co-wrote their 1970 song "Without You," which has been recorded by over 180 artists—most notably, Harry Nilsson and Mariah Carey. Evans died by suicide in 1983, one of two members to do so, the first being Pete Ham in 1975.

== Early years ==
Evans was born in Liverpool, England, grew up in a working-class family. He was part of band the Calderstones before joining the Iveys.

== Badfinger ==
In November 1969, the Iveys changed their name to Badfinger, and Paul McCartney of the Beatles gave the group a boost by offering them his song "Come and Get It", which he produced for the band. It became a featured track for the film The Magic Christian, which starred Ringo Starr and Peter Sellers. A third Magic Christian song, "Carry On Till Tomorrow" was co-written by Evans and Ham.

Alongside Joey Molland, Evans played acoustic guitar on the 1971 John Lennon album, Imagine, including the single "Jealous Guy" released in 1985. Evans' high-career moment was with his composition "Without You", a song co-written with bandmate Ham. The song became a No. 1 hit worldwide for Harry Nilsson and had since become a standard in the music industry.

After Pete Ham's death, Evans and Molland reunited as Badfinger and recorded two albums, "Airwaves" and "Say No More", but they went their separate ways after the latter album was released, and the two put together rival Badfinger touring bands in the US.

In 1982, Bob Jackson rejoined Evans in the latter's version of Badfinger. Original Badfinger drummer Gibbins was also enlisted for Evans' band for one tour. After returning to Britain, Evans was sued for $5 million in damages for abandoning his touring contract, which Evans had involuntarily abandoned due to the legal dispute he had to resort to against Molland over the rights to the song "Without You", and a court order had ordered the dissolution of his version of Badfinger, and also Evans could have gone to jail as part of the lawsuit.

== Personal life and death ==
Evans was married to Marianne Evans, and together they had a son, Stephen.

Evans hanged himself from a willow tree in his garden on 19 November 1983, at the age of 36. He had fallen into a dispute with former bandmate Joey Molland over royalties for the song "Without You" the previous evening.

== Discography ==
(with Badfinger, except where noted)

- Maybe Tomorrow (1969 as "The Iveys", Apple Records)
- Magic Christian Music (1970, Apple Records)
- No Dice (1970, Apple Records)
- Straight Up (1971, Apple Records)
- Ass (1973, Apple Records)
- Badfinger (1974, Warner Brothers Records)
- Wish You Were Here (1974, Warner Brothers Records)
- Airwaves (1979, Elektra Records)
- Say No More (1981, Radio Records)
- Over You: The Final Tracks (1993 as "Tom Evans with Rod Roach", Gipsy Records)
- Head First (2000, Snapper Music)
- 94 Baker Street (5 tracks by the Iveys) (2003, RPM Records)
- An Apple a Day (4 tracks by the Iveys) (2006, RPM Records)
- Treacle Toffee World (2 tracks by the Iveys) (2008, RPM Records)
- I Am Myself (2024, Y&T Music)

Evans also appeared as a guest artist on

- The Concert for Bangladesh (album)
- All Things Must Pass by George Harrison (album)
- "It Don't Come Easy" by Ringo Starr (single)
- Imagine by John Lennon (album)

== Compositions of note ==
- "Maybe Tomorrow" (U.S. Billboard No. 67, Cash Box No. 51 by the Iveys)
- "Carry On Till Tomorrow" (album track, co-written with Pete Ham, Magic Christian Music)
- "Without You" (Billboard No. 1 by Harry Nilsson, No. 3 by Mariah Carey, No. 28 by Clay Aiken)
- "Better Days" (album track, co-written with Joey Molland, No Dice)
- "I Don't Mind" (album track, co-written with Joey Molland, No Dice)
- "When I Say" (album track, Ass)
- "Shine On" (album track, co-written with Pete Ham, Badfinger)
- "Lost Inside Your Love" (by Badfinger, failed to chart)
- "Hold On" (Billboard No. 56, Cash Box No. 67 by Badfinger)
