= Apple Records discography =

This is the discography of Apple Records, a record label formed by the Beatles in 1968. During its early years, the label enjoyed a fair degree of commercial success, most notably with Mary Hopkin and Badfinger, as well as discovering acts such as James Taylor and Billy Preston, who would go on to greater success with other labels. However, by the mid-1970s, Apple had become little more than an outlet for the Beatles' solo recordings (although, as the solo Beatles were actually still under contract to EMI, the Apple label was, in truth, only a cosmetic addition to their releases). After EMI's contract with the Beatles ended in 1976, the Apple label was finally wound up. The label was reactivated in the 1990s with many of the original Apple albums being reissued on compact disc, and the company now oversees new Beatles releases such as the Anthology and 1 albums as well as the 2009 Beatles remastering programme. In 2010, Apple set about remastering and reissuing its back catalogue for a second time.

For convenience, releases are divided into United Kingdom and United States releases. However, some releases that were designated a UK-sequence catalogue number were only issued in certain mainland European countries. Additionally, with the Beatles still being under contract to EMI, all of the group's records (and the majority of their UK solo releases) retained the numbering systems of Parlophone (for the UK, New Zealand and South Africa), Capitol (for the US) and EMI (for Australia). The Republic of Ireland released eight Apple singles in 1970–71, six of which had unique catalogue numbers. Since the 2013 takeover of EMI by Universal Music, the titles have yet to be reissued with Universal catalogue numbers and UPCs. The recordings with which George Harrison was involved, including his solo work, however, were reissued by Dark Horse/BMG Rights Management beginning in 2023.

== Singles ==
Catalogue Number				Artist	Title	Release Date			
UK	US	Aus.	NZ	Artist	Title	UK	US	Aus.	NZ
R 5722 ^{[48]}	2276	A-8493 ^{[37]}	^{[39]}	The Beatles	"Hey Jude" / "Revolution"	30.08.68	26.08.68	19.09.68	–
APPLE 1	–	–	–	Frank Sinatra	"The Lady Is a Champ – But Beautiful" ^{[1]}	–	–	–	–
APPLE 2 ^{[49]}	1801	APPLE-8526	APPLE 2	Mary Hopkin	"Those Were the Days" / "Turn! Turn! Turn!"^{[46]}	30.08.68	26.08.68	.68	.68
APPLE 3	1802	APPLE-8537 ^{[37]}	–	Jackie Lomax	"Sour Milk Sea" / "The Eagle Laughs at You"	30.08.68	26.08.68	.68	–
APPLE 4	1800	–	–	John Foster & Sons Ltd. Black Dyke Mills Band	"Thingumybob" / "Yellow Submarine"	30.08.68	26.08.68	–	–
APPLE 5	1803	APPLE-8631	APPLE 5	The Iveys	"Maybe Tomorrow" / "And Her Daddy's a Millionaire"^{[47]}	15.11.68	27.01.69	.69	.69
–	–	–	–	The Beatles	"Back in the USSR" / "Don't Pass Me By" ^{[56]}	–	–	–	–
APPLE 6	1804	APPLE-8739	APPLE 6	Trash ^{[2]}	"Road to Nowhere" / "Illusions"	24.01.69	03.03.69	05.69	.69
–	–	A-8693	NZP.3318	The Beatles	"Ob-La-Di, Ob-La-Da" / "While My Guitar Gently Weeps" ^{[51]}	–	–	20.02.69	.69
–	–	–	–	The Beatles	"Ob-La-Di, Ob-La-Da" / "I Will" ^{[57]}	–	–	–	–
APPLE 7	–	–	–	Mary Hopkin	"Lontano Dagli Occhi" / "The Game" ^{[3]}	07.03.69	–	–	–
APPLE 8	–	–	–	Brute Force	"King of Fuh" / "Nobody Knows" ^{[4]}	16.05.69	–	–	–
APPLE 9	–	–	–	Mary Hopkin	"Prince En Avignon" / "The Game" ^{[5]}	07.03.69	–	–	–
–	1805	–	–	James Taylor	"Carolina in My Mind" / "Taking It In"	–	17.03.69	–	–
–	–	–	–	James Taylor	"Knocking 'Round the Zoo" / "Something's Wrong"^{[59]}	–	–	–	–
APPLE 10	1806	APPLE-8726	APPLE 10	Mary Hopkin	"Goodbye" / "Sparrow"	28.03.69	07.04.69	.69	.69
R 5777	2490	A-8763	NZP.3325	The Beatles with Billy Preston	"Get Back" / "Don't Let Me Down"	11.04.69	05.05.69	08.05.69	.69
APPLE 11	–	APPLE-8788	APPLE.11	Jackie Lomax	"New Day" / "Fall Inside Your Eyes"	09.05.69	–	.69	.69
R 5786	2531	A-8793	NZP.3329	The Beatles	"The Ballad of John and Yoko" / "Old Brown Shoe"	30.05.69	04.06.69	19.06.69	.69
–	1807	–	–	Jackie Lomax	"New Day" / "Thumbin' a Ride"	–	02.06.69	–	–
APPLE 12	1808	APPLE-8841	APPLE.12	Billy Preston	"That's the Way God Planned It" / "What About You"	27.06.69	14.07.69	.69	.69
APPLE 13/ R 5795	1809	A-8833	NZP.3333	Plastic Ono Band	"Give Peace a Chance" / "Remember Love"	04.07.69	07.07.69	.69	.69
APPLE 14	–	–	–	The Iveys	"Dear Angie" / "No Escaping Your Love" ^{[6]}	–	–	–	–
CT 1	–	–	–	Various Artists	"Wall's Ice Cream EP" ^{[7]}	18.07.69	–	–	–
APPLE 15	1810	APPLE-8895	APPLE.15	Radha Krishna Temple (London)	"Hare Krishna Mantra" / "Prayer to the Spiritual Masters"	29.08.69	21.08.69	.69	.69
APPLE 16	–	–	–	Mary Hopkin	"Que Sera, Sera" / "Fields of St. Etienne" ^{[8]}	19.09.69	15.06.70	–	–
APPLE 17	1811	APPLE-8960	APPLE.17	Trash	"Golden Slumbers-Carry That Weight" / "Trash Can"	26.09.69	15.10.69	.11.69	
APPLE 18	1812	APPLE-8953		Hot Chocolate Band	"Give Peace a Chance" / "Living Without Tomorrow"	10.10.69	27.10.69	.69	
APPLE 19	1814	APPLE-8975		Billy Preston	"Everything's Alright" / "I Want to Thank You"	17.10.69	10.11.69	.69	
APPLES 1001	1813	APPLE-8967	APPLES.1001	Plastic Ono Band	"Cold Turkey" / "Don't Worry Kyoko"	24.10.69	20.10.69	.69	.69
R 5814	2654	A-8943	NZP.3245	The Beatles	"Something" / "Come Together"	31.10.69	06.10.69	16.10.69	.69
APPLE 20	1815	APPLE-9016	APPLE.20	Badfinger	"Come and Get It" / "Rock of All Ages"	05.12.69	02.02.70	.69	
APPLES 1002	–	–	–	Plastic Ono Band	"You Know My Name (Look Up The Number)" / "What's the New Mary Jane" ^{[9]}	–	–	–	–
–	–	–	–	The Beatles	"You're Going to Lose That Girl" / "Tell Me What You See"	–	–	–	–
–	–	–	–	The Beatles	"Dialogue from the Beatles' Motion Picture 'Let it Be'"	–	.70	–	–
APPLE 21	1817	APPLE-9065	APPLE.21	Billy Preston	"All That I've Got" / "As I Get Older"	30.01.70	16.02.70	.70	.70
APPLE 22	1816	APPLE-9053	APPLE.22	Mary Hopkin	"Temma Harbour" / "Lontano Dagli Occhi"	16.01.70	09.02.70	.70	.70
APPLE 23	–	APPLE-9043	APPLE.23	Jackie Lomax	"How the Web Was Woven" / "Thumbin' a Ride"	06.02.70	–	.70	.70
APPLE 24	1820	APPLE-9066	APPLE.24	Doris Troy	"Ain't That Cute" / "Vaya Con Dios"	13.02.70	16.03.70	.70	.70
APPLES 1003	1818	APPLE-9084	APPLES.1003	Lennon/Ono/Plastic Ono Band	"Instant Karma!" / "Who Has Seen the Wind?"	06.02.70	20.02.70	.03.70	.70
R 5833	2764	A-9083	NZP.3257	The Beatles	"Let It Be" / "You Know My Name (Look Up The Number)"	06.03.70	11.03.70	12.03.70	.70
APPLE 25	1821	APPLE-9092	APPLE.25	Radha Krishna Temple (London)	"Govinda" / "Govinda Jai Jai"	06.03.70	24.03.70	04.70	.70
–	1819	–	–	Jackie Lomax	"How the Web Was Woven" / "(I) Fall Inside Your Eyes"	–	23.03.70	–	–
APPLE 26	–	APPLE-9105	APPLE.26	Mary Hopkin	"Knock, Knock Who's There?" / "I'm Going to Fall in Love Again"	23.03.70	–	.04.70	.70
–	2832	A-9163	NZP.3371	The Beatles	"The Long and Winding Road" / "For You Blue"	–	11.05.70	11.06.70	.70
–	–	–	–	The Beatles	"Oh! Darling" / "Here Comes the Sun" ^{[54]}	–	–	–	–
APPLE 27	1823	APPLE-9190	APPLE.27	Mary Hopkin	"Que Sera, Sera" / "Fields of St. Etienne" ^{[10]}	–	15.06.70	.70	.70
APPLE 28	1824	–	APPLE.28	Doris Troy	"Jacob's Ladder" / "Get Back" ^{[11]}	28.08.70	21.09.70	–	
APPLE 29	–	–	–	Billy Preston	"My Sweet Lord" / "Long As I Got My Baby" ^{[12]}	–	–	–	–
–	2969	APPLE-9309	NZP.3388	Ringo Starr	"Beaucoups of Blues" / "Coochy-Coochy"	–	05.10.70	.70	.70
–	1822	–	–	Badfinger	"No Matter What" / "Carry on Till Tomorrow"	–	19.10.70	–	–
APPLE 30	1825	APPLE-9297	APPLE.30	Mary Hopkin	"Think About Your Children" / "Heritage"	16.10.70	02.11.70	.70	.70
APPLE 31	–	APPLE-9316	APPLE.31	Badfinger	"No Matter What" / "Better Days"	06.11.70	–	.70	.70
APPLE 32	–	APPLE-9318	APPLE.32	James Taylor	"Carolina in My Mind" / "Something's Wrong"	06.11.70	–	.71	.71
–	2995	A-9342	NZP.3391	George Harrison	"My Sweet Lord" / "Isn't It a Pity"	–	23.11.70	.71	.71
–	1826	–	–	Billy Preston	"My Sweet Lord" / "Little Girl"	–	14.12.70	–	–
–	1827	A-9401	NZP.3395	John Lennon/Plastic Ono Band	"Mother" / "Why"	–	28.12.70	.71	.71
R 5884	–	–	–	George Harrison	"My Sweet Lord" / "What Is Life"	15.01.71	–	–	–
–	1828	A-9424	NZP.3397	George Harrison	"What Is Life" / "Apple Scruffs"	–	15.02.71	.71	.71
R 5889^{[19]}	1829	A-9445	NZP.3398	Paul McCartney	"Another Day" / "Oh Woman, Oh Why"	19.02.71	22.02.71	.71	.71
R 5892 ^{[45]}	–	A-9488	NZP.3400	John Lennon/Plastic Ono Band	"Power to the People" / "Open Your Box"	12.03.71	–	.71	.71
–	1830	–	–	John Lennon/Plastic Ono Band	"Power to the People" / "Touch Me"	–	22.03.71	–	–
R 5898	1831	A-9474	NZP.3402	Ringo Starr	"It Don't Come Easy" / "Early 1970"	09.04.71	16.04.71	.71	.71
APPLE 33	1832	APPLE-9478	APPLE.33	Ronnie Spector	"Try Some, Buy Some" / "Tandoori Chicken"	16.04.71	19.04.71	.71	.71
APPLE 34	–	APPLE-9565	APPLE.34	Mary Hopkin	"Let My Name Be Sorrow" / "Kew Gardens"	18.06.71	–	.71	.71
APPLE 35	1833 ^{[12]}	–	–	Badfinger	"Name of the Game" / "Suitcase"	–	–	–	–
–	1834	–	–	Jackie Lomax	"Sour Milk Sea" / "I Fall Inside Your Eyes"	–	21.06.71	–	–
–	–	A-9592	NZP.3406	Paul & Linda McCartney	"Eat at Home" / "Smile Away"^{[38]}	–	–	.71	.71
APPLE 36	1835	APPLE-9599	APPLE.36	Bill Elliot and the Elastic Oz Band	"God Save Us" / "Do the Oz"	16.07.71	07.07.71	.71	.71
R 5912 ^{[50]}	1836	A-9615	NZP.3408	George Harrison	"Bangla Desh" / "Deep Blue"	30.07.71	28.07.71	.71	.71
–	1837	A-9669	NZP.3410	Paul & Linda McCartney	"Uncle Albert/Admiral Halsey" / "Too Many People"	–	02.08.71	.71	.71
R 5914 ^{[50]} ^{[19]}	–	–	–	Paul & Linda McCartney	"The Back Seat of My Car" / "Heart of the Country"	13.08.71	–	–	–
APPLE 37	1838	–	–	Ravi Shankar	"Joi Bangla" / "Oh Bhaugowan" / "Raga Mishri"	27.08.71	31.08.71	–	–
APPLE 38	1839	APPLE-9725	APPLE.38	Yoko Ono	"Mrs. Lennon" / "Midsummer New York"	29.10.71	29.09.71	.71	.71
–	1840	–	NZP.3412	John Lennon	"Imagine" / "It's So Hard"	–	11.10.71	–	.71
–	1841	–	–	Badfinger	"Day After Day" / "Money"	–	15.11.71	–	–
APPLE 39	–	APPLE-9742	APPLE.39	Mary Hopkin	"Water, Paper And Clay" / "Jefferson"	26.11.71	–	.71	
–	1843	–	–	Mary Hopkin	"Water, Paper and Clay" / "Streets of London"	–	26.11.71	–	–
R 5932	–	–	–	Wings	"Love Is Strange" / "I Am Your Singer" ^{[12]}	–	–	–	–
APPLE 40	–	APPLE-9782	APPLE.40	Badfinger	"Day After Day" / "Sweet Tuesday Morning"	14.01.72	–	.72	.72
APPLE 41	–	–	–	Yoko Ono	"Mind Train" / "Listen, the Snow Is Falling"	21.01.72	–	–	–
–	1846	–	–	John Lennon/Plastic Ono Band	"The Luck of the Irish" / "Attica State" ^{[12]}	–	–	–	–
–	–	–	–	The Beatles	"All Together Now" / "Hey Bulldog" ^{[55]}	–	–	–	–
R 5936^{[19]}	1847	A-9866	NZP.3423	Wings	"Give Ireland Back to the Irish" / "Give Ireland Back to the Irish (version)"	25.02.72	28.02.72	.72	.72
R 5944	1849	A-9879	NZP.3425	Ringo Starr	"Back Off Boogaloo" / "Blindman"	18.03.72	20.03.72	.04.72	.72
APPLE 42 ^{[13]}	1844	APPLE-9888	APPLE.42	Badfinger	"Baby Blue" / "Flying"	–	20.03.72	.05.72	.72
–	1845	–	–	Lon & Derrek Van Eaton	"Sweet Music" / "Song of Songs"	–	20.03.72	–	–
–	6498/6499	–	–	David Peel And The Lower East Side	"F Is Not A Dirty Word" / "The Ballad Of New York City / John Lennon-Yoko Ono"	–	20.4.72	–	–
R 5949^{[19]}	1851	A-9924	NZP.3427	Wings	"Mary Had a Little Lamb" / "Little Woman Love"	12.05.72	29.05.72	.06.72	.72
R 5953 ^{[13]}	1848	–	NZP.3441	John Lennon/Plastic Ono Band	"Woman Is the Nigger of the World" / "Sisters, O Sisters"	–	24.04.72	–	.72
APPLE 43	1850	APPLE-9948	APPLE.43	Chris Hodge	"We're on Our Way" / "Supersoul"	09.06.72	29.05.72	.72	.72
–	6545/6546	–	–	David Peel And The Lower East Side	"The Hippie From New York City" / "The Ballad Of New York City / John Lennon-Yoko Ono"	–	16.6.72	–	–
APPLE 44^{[42]}	1852	APPLE-10077	APPLE.44	The Sundown Playboys	"Saturday Nite Special" / "Valse De Soleil Coucher"	17.11.72	31.10.72	.73	.73
–	1853	–	–	Yoko Ono	"Now or Never" / "Move on Fast"	–	13.11.72	–	–
R 5970	1842	A-10047	NZP.3446	John & Yoko/Plastic Ono Band	"Happy Xmas (War Is Over)" / "Listen, the Snow Is Falling"^{[40]}	24.11.72	01.12.71	.72	.72
–	1854	APPLE-10095	–	Elephant's Memory	"Liberation Special" / "Madness"	–	30.11.72	.12.72	–
–	1855	–	–	Mary Hopkin	"Knock Knock, Who's There?" / "International"	–	13.11.72	–	–
APPLE 45	–	–	–	Elephant's Memory	"Power Boogie" / "Liberation Special"	01.12.72	–	–	–
R 5973^{[19]}	1857	A-10099	NZP.3449	Wings	"Hi, Hi, Hi" / "C Moon"	01.12.72	04.12.72	.01.73	.73
–	1858	–	–	Chris Hodge	"Goodbye, Sweet Lorraine" / "Contact Love"	–	31.01.73	–	–
APPLE 46	–	–	–	Lon & Derrek Van Eaton	"Warm Woman" / "More Than Words"	09.03.73	–	–	–
R 5985 ^{[19]}	1861	A-10200	NZP.3453	Paul McCartney & Wings ^{[41]}	"My Love" / "The Mess"	23.03.73	09.04.73	.73	.73
APPLE 47	1859	–	–	Yoko Ono	"Death of Samantha" / "Yang Yang"	04.05.73	26.02.73	–	–
R 5987^{[19]}	1863	A-10270	NZP.3456	Wings	"Live and Let Die" / "I Lie Around"	01.06.73	18.06.73	.73	.73
R 5988	1862	A-10230	NZP.3455	George Harrison	"Give Me Love (Give Me Peace on Earth)" / "Miss O'Dell"	25.05.73	07.05.73	.73	.73
R 5992	1865	A-10360	NZP.3461	Ringo Starr	"Photograph" / "Down and Out"	19.10.73	24.09.73	.73	.73
–	1866	–	–	George Harrison	"Don't Let Me Wait Too Long" / "Sue Me, Sue You Blues" ^{[14]}	–	–	–	–
–	1867	–	–	Yoko Ono	"Woman Power" / "Men Men Men"	–	24.09.73	–	–
R 5993^{[19]}	1869	A-10359	NZP.3462	Paul McCartney & Wings	"Helen Wheels" / "Country Dreamer"	26.10.73	12.11.73	.73	
APPLE 48	–	–	–	Yoko Ono	"Run, Run, Run" / "Men Men Men"	09.11.73	–	–	–
R 5994	1868	A-10365	NZP.3463	John Lennon	"Mind Games" / "Meat City"	16.11.73	29.10.73	.74	
R 5995^{[20]}	1870	A-10430	NZP.3465	Ringo Starr	"You're Sixteen" / "Devil Woman"	08.02.74	03.12.73	.74	.74
–	–	A-10424	NZP.3466	Paul McCartney & Wings	"Mrs. Vandebilt" / "Bluebird"	–	–	.74	.74
–	1871	–	–	Paul McCartney & Wings	"Jet" / "Mamunia" ^{[15]}	–	28.01.74	–	–
R 5996^{[19]}	1871	–	NZP.3466	Paul McCartney & Wings	"Jet" / "Let Me Roll It"	15.02.74	18.02.74	–	.74
–	1872	A-10484	NZP.3471	Ringo Starr	"Oh My My" / "Step Lightly"	–	18.02.74	.74	.74
APPLE 49	1864	APPLE-10438	APPLE.49	Badfinger	"Apple of My Eye" / "Blind Owl"	08.03.74	10.12.73	.74	.74
–	1873	–	NZP.3479	Paul McCartney & Wings	"Band on the Run" / "Nineteen Hundred and Eighty-Five"^{[44]}	–	08.04.74	–	.74
R 5997^{[19]}	–	–	–	Paul McCartney & Wings	"Band on the Run" / "Zoo Gang"	28.06.74	–	–	–
R 5998	1874	A-10630	NZP.3441	John Lennon	"Whatever Gets You thru the Night" / "Beef Jerky"	04.10.74	23.09.74	.74	.74
R 5999^{[19]}	1875	A-10626	NZP.3487	Paul McCartney & Wings	"Junior's Farm" / "Sally G" ^{[16]}	25.10.74	04.11.74	.74	.74
R 6000	1876	A-10671	NZP3588	Ringo Starr	"Only You (And You Alone)" / "Call Me"	15.11.74	11.11.74	.74	.74
–	1877	–	NZP.3493	George Harrison	"Dark Horse" / "I Don't Care Anymore"	–	18.11.74	–	.74
R 6001	–	A-10696		George Harrison	"Dark Horse" / "Hari's On Tour (Express)"	28.02.75	–	.75	–
R 6002	–	A-10629	NZP.3494	George Harrison	"Ding Dong, Ding Dong" / "I Don't Care Anymore"	06.12.74	–	.74	.74
R 6003	1878	A-10694	NZP.3495	John Lennon	"#9 Dream" / "What You Got"	31.01.75	16.12.74	.75	.75
–	1879	–		George Harrison	"Ding Dong, Ding Dong" / "Hari's On Tour (Express)"	–	23.12.74	–	–
–	1880	–	–	Ringo Starr	"No No Song" / "Snookeroo"	–	27.01.75	–	–
R 6004	–	A-10711	–	Ringo Starr	"Snookeroo" / "Oo-Wee"	21.02.75	–	.75	–
R 6005	1881	A-10779	NZP.3503	John Lennon	"Stand by Me" / "Move Over Ms. L"	18.04.75	10.03.75	.75	.75
–	–	–	–	John Lennon	"Be-Bop-A-Lula" / "Move Over Ms. L" ^{[58]}	–	–	–	–
–	–	–	NZP.3510	Ringo Starr	"No No Song" / "Call Me"	–	–	–	.75
–	1882	–	–	Ringo Starr	"(It's All Down To) Goodnight Vienna" / "Oo-Wee"	–	02.06.75	–	–
–	1883	–	–	John Lennon	"Slippin' and Slidin'" / "Ain't That a Shame" ^{[12]}	–	–	–	–
R 6007	1884	A-10920	NZP.3520	George Harrison	"You" / "World of Stone"	12.09.75	15.09.75	29.09.75	.75
R 6009	–	–	–	John Lennon	"Imagine" / "Working Class Hero"	24.10.75	–	–	–
R 6011	–	–	–	Ringo Starr	"Oh My My" / "No No Song"	09.01.76	–	–	–
R 6012	1885	A-11017	NZP.3528	George Harrison	"This Guitar (Can't Keep from Crying)" / "Māya Love"	06.02.76	08.12.75	.76	.76
G45 2^{[17]}	–	–	–	John Lennon	"Give Peace a Chance" / "Cold Turkey"	12.03.84	–	–	–
G45 13^{[17]}	–	–	–	Ringo Starr	"It Don't Come Easy" / "Back Off Boogaloo"	12.03.84	–	–	–
APP 1	–	–		Various Artists	"Apple EP" ^{[18]}	21.10.91	–	–	–
R 6406	8583492			The Beatles	"Baby It's You" / "I'll Follow the Sun" / "Devil in Her Heart" / "Boys"	06.03.95	01.12.94		
R 6422	8584972			The Beatles	"Free as a Bird" / "Christmas Time (Is Here Again)"	04.12.95	12.12.95		
R 6425	8585442			The Beatles	"Real Love" / "Baby's in Black"	04.03.96	05.03.96		
				The Beatles	"Now and Then" / "Love Me Do"	02.11.23	02.11.23		

^{1} Not planned for release. A special recorded "message" medley from Frank Sinatra to Maureen Starkey. One single-sided single pressed and the master tape has been destroyed.
^{2} Early UK editions credited to 'White Trash'.
^{3} Only released in Italy – 17.01.69.
^{4} Not given a full release, as EMI would not distribute. Only 2000 copies were pressed in the UK. An unnumbered US Apple acetate also exists.
^{5} Only released in France – 07.03.69.
^{6} Only released in Europe and Japan – 18.07.69.
^{7} Mail order only EP featuring: The Iveys "Storm in a Teacup" / James Taylor "Something's Wrong" / Jackie Lomax "Little Yellow Pill" / Mary Hopkin "Pebble and the Man".
^{8} Not issued. Planned release date – 19.09.69. APPLE 16 was also allocated to Mortimer's unreleased recording of "On Our Way Home".
^{9} Not issued. Planned release date - .12.69.
^{10} Not issued in UK. Issued as APPLE 28 in some European countries.
^{11} Issued as APPLE 27 in some European countries.
^{12} Not issued.
^{13} Not issued in UK. Planned release date for Lennon – 5.12.72.
^{14} Cancelled release. Made it only to the acetate stage. Planned release date – 24.9.73.
^{15} Re-issued with "Let Me Roll It" as the B side on 18.02.74.
^{16} Re-issued on 07.02.75 (UK) and 20.02.75 (US) with the same catalogue numbers but with the A and B sides reversed.
^{17} Released as part of a series of EMI "Golden 45's".
^{18} Four track EP featuring: Mary Hopkin "Those Were The Days" / Billy Preston "That's the Way God Planned It" / Jackie Lomax "Sour Milk Sea" / Badfinger "Come and Get It".
^{19} Re-issued from 1975 with the same catalogue number (and sometimes artwork) on Capitol after McCartney's contract moved from Parlophone.
^{20} Re-issued with the same catalogue number on the Parlophone label.
^{37} Originally issued on Parlophone.
^{38} Double A Side.
^{39} Released on Parlophone before the establishment of Apple Records (New Zealand).
^{40} Originally released APon green vinyl and reissued on black vinyl.
^{41} Some issues list "McCartney's Wings".
^{42} Released as a 7-inch 45 rpm and a 10-inch 78 rpm.
^{44} Demo copies have the tracks "Band On The Run" (Edited Version) / "Band On The Run" (Full Version).
^{45} Also released as a double A side and with reversed A and B side.
^{46} Released in "East Asia" (Hong Kong) by Parlophone, Catalogue number PEA-501.
^{47} Released in "East Asia" (Hong Kong) by Parlophone, Catalogue number PEA-502.
^{48} Due to extreme demands on production, EMI also contracted Decca and Philips to press this release.
^{49} Due to extreme demands on production, EMI also contracted Philips to press this release.
^{50} Due to industrial action, EMI also contracted Decca to press this release.
^{51} Originally planned for release with flipped sides.
^{54} Released in Japan as AR-2520 on 05.06.70.
^{55} Released in several European countries in early February 1972.
^{56} Released in Sweden in December 1968 and Norway in April 1969 as SD 6061.
^{57} Released in the Philippines as AL 60838.
^{58} Released in several European countries in March 1975.
^{59} Released in France as APF 506.

== Albums ==
Catalogue No.		Artist	Title	Release Date	
UK	US	Artist	Title	UK	US
SAPCOR 1 ^{[36]}	ST 3350	George Harrison	Wonderwall Music	01.11.68	02.12.68
PCS (PMC) 7067/68	SWBO 101	The Beatles	The Beatles	22.11.68	25.11.68
SAPCOR 2	T 5001 ^{[33]}	John Lennon & Yoko Ono	Unfinished Music No.1: Two Virgins	29.11.68	17.01.69
SAPCOR 3	SKAO 3352	James Taylor	James Taylor	06.12.68	17.02.69
SAPCOR 4	ST 3353	Modern Jazz Quartet	Under the Jasmin Tree	06.12.68	17.02.69
PCS (PMC) 7070	SW 153	The Beatles	Yellow Submarine	17.01.69	13.01.69
SAPCOR 5	ST 3351	Mary Hopkin	Postcard	21.02.69	03.03.69
SAPCOR 6	ST 3354	Jackie Lomax	Is This What You Want?	14.03.69	17.05.69
SAPCOR 7	–	Delaney & Bonnie	The Original Delaney & Bonnie ^{[21]}	–	–
SAPCOR 8	ST 3355	The Iveys	Maybe Tomorrow ^{[22]}	–	–
SAPCOR 9	ST 3359	Billy Preston	That's the Way God Planned It	22.08.69	10.09.69
PCS 7088	SO 383	The Beatles	Abbey Road	26.09.69	01.10.69
SAPCOR 10	STAO 3360	Modern Jazz Quartet	Space	24.10.69	10.11.69
SAPCOR 11	SMAX 3361	John Lennon & Yoko Ono	Wedding Album	07.11.69	20.10.69
CORE 2001	SW 3362	Plastic Ono Band	Live Peace in Toronto 1969	12.12.69	12.12.69
SAPCOR 12	ST 3364	Badfinger	Magic Christian Music	09.01.70	16.02.70
CPCS 106 ^{[43]}	SW 385 / SO 385	The Beatles	Hey Jude	–	26.02.70
PCS 7101	SW 3365	Ringo Starr	Sentimental Journey	27.03.70	24.04.70
PCS 7102	SMAS 3363	Paul McCartney	McCartney	17.04.70	20.04.70
PXS 1	AR 34001	The Beatles	Let It Be	08.05.70	18.05.70
SAPCOR 13	ST 3371	Doris Troy	Doris Troy	11.09.70	11.09.70
SAPCOR 14	ST 3370	Billy Preston	Encouraging Words	11.09.70	11.09.70
PAS 10002	SMAS 3368	Ringo Starr	Beaucoups of Blues	25.09.70	28.09.70
SAPCOR 15	SMAS 3369	London Sinfonietta / John Tavener	The Whale	25.09.70	15.10.70
PCS 7096	–	The Beatles	Let It Be ^{[23]}	06.11.70	–
SAPCOR 16^{[26]}	SKAO 3367	Badfinger	No Dice	27.11.70	09.11.70
STCH 639	STCH 639	George Harrison	All Things Must Pass	30.11.70	27.11.70
PCS 7124	SW 3372	John Lennon/Plastic Ono Band	John Lennon/Plastic Ono Band	11.12.70	11.12.70
SAPCOR 17	SW 3373	Yoko Ono/Plastic Ono Band	Yoko Ono/Plastic Ono Band	11.12.70	11.12.70
LYN 2154	–	The Beatles	From Then To You ^{[24]}	18.12.70	–
–	SBC 100	The Beatles	The Beatles Christmas album ^{[24]}	–	14.02.71
PAS 10003	SMAS 3375	Paul & Linda McCartney	Ram	28.05.71	17.05.71
SAPCOR 18	SKAO 3376	Radha Krishna Temple (London)	The Radha Krsna Temple	28.05.71	21.05.71
SAPCOR 19 ^{[27]}	SW 3387	Badfinger	Straight Up	04.02.72	13.12.71
SAPCOR 20	–	London Sinfonietta / John Tavener	Celtic Requiem	14.05.71	–
–	SW 3377	Stelvio Cipriani	Come Together	–	20.09.71
SAPCOR 21	SMAS 3381	Mary Hopkin	Earth Song/Ocean Song	01.10.71	03.11.71
PAS 10004	SW 3379	John Lennon	Imagine	08.10.71	09.09.71
SAPTU 101/2	SVBB 3380	Yoko Ono	Fly	03.12.71	20.09.71
–	SWAO 3384	Original Soundtrack Recording	Raga	–	07.12.71
PCS 7142	SW 3386	Wings	Wild Life^{[35]}	07.12.71	07.12.71
STCX 3385	STCX 3385	George Harrison And Friends	The Concert for Bangladesh	10.01.72	20.12.71
–	SWAO 3388	Original Soundtrack Recording	El Topo	–	27.12.71
5C 244-93536	–	Mary Hopkin	The Best of Mary Hopkin^{[52]}	31.03.72	–
–	SW 3391	David Peel & The Lower East Side	The Pope Smokes Dope ^{[31]}	–	17.04.72
PCSP 716	SVBB 3392	John & Yoko/Plastic Ono Band	Some Time in New York City	15.09.72	16.06.72
SAPCOR 22	SMAS 3389	Elephant's Memory	Elephant's Memory	10.11.72	18.09.72
SAPCOR 23	SW 3395	Mary Hopkin	Those Were The Days	24.11.72	25.09.72
APCOR 24	SW 3400	Various Artists	Phil Spector's Christmas Album ^{[25]}	08.12.72	01.12.72
SAPCOR 25	SMAS 3390	Lon & Derrek Van Eaton	Brother	09.02.73	22.09.72
SAPDO 1001	SVBB 3399	Yoko Ono	Approximately Infinite Universe	16.02.73	08.01.73
SAPDO 1002	SVBB 3396	Ravi Shankar & Ali Akbar Khan	In Concert 1972	13.04.73	13.04.73
PCSP 717	SKBO 3403	The Beatles	1962–1966	19.04.73	02.04.73
PCSP 718	SKBO 3404	The Beatles	1967–1970	19.04.73	02.04.73
PCTC 251	SMAL 3409	Paul McCartney & Wings	Red Rose Speedway^{[35]}	04.05.73	03.04.73
PAS 10006	SMAS 3410	George Harrison	Living in the Material World	22.06.73	30.05.73
PCS 7165	SW 3414	John Lennon	Mind Games^{[34]}	16.11.73	02.11.73
SAPCOR 26	SW 3412	Yoko Ono	Feeling the Space	23.11.73	02.11.73
PCTC 252	SWAL 3413	Ringo Starr	Ringo^{[34]}	23.11.73	02.11.73
PAS 10007	SO 3415	Paul McCartney & Wings	Band on the Run	07.12.73	05.12.73
SAPCOR 27^{[30]}	SW 3411	Badfinger	Ass	08.03.74	26.11.73
PCTC 253	SW 3416	John Lennon	Walls and Bridges	04.10.74	26.11.74
PCS 7168	SW 3417	Ringo Starr	Goodnight Vienna	15.11.74	18.11.74
PAS 10008	SMAS 3418	George Harrison	Dark Horse^{[34]}	20.12.74	09.12.74
PCS 7169	SK 3419	John Lennon	Rock 'n' Roll^{[34]}	21.02.75	17.02.75
PAS 10009	SW 3420	George Harrison	Extra Texture (Read All About It)^{[35]}	03.10.75	22.09.75
PCS 7173	SW 3421	John Lennon	Shaved Fish	24.10.75	24.10.75
PCS 7170	SW 3422	Ringo Starr	Blast from Your Past^{[34]}	12.12.75	20.11.75
PCSP 726	7243 8 31796	The Beatles	Live at the BBC	30.11.94	30.11.94
SAPCOR 28	7243 8 30129	Badfinger	The Best of Badfinger	31.05.95	95
PCSP 727	7243 8 34445	The Beatles	Anthology 1	21.11.95	21.11.95
PCSP 728	7243 8 34448	The Beatles	Anthology 2	18.03.96	18.03.96
PCSP 729	7243 8 34451	The Beatles	Anthology 3	28.10.96	28.10.96
7243 5 21481	7243 8 34451	The Beatles	Yellow Submarine Songtrack	13.09.99	14.09.99
7243 5 26974	7243 5 26974	Badfinger	The Very Best of Badfinger	23.10.00	13.09.00
7243 5 29970	7243 5 29970	The Beatles	1	13.11.00	13.11.00
7243 5 95713	7243 5 95713	The Beatles	Let It Be... Naked	17.11.03	18.11.03
7243 8 75400	0946 8 66878 2	The Beatles	The Capitol Albums, Volume 1	15.11.04	16.11.04
7243 3 60335	0946 3 57497 2	The Beatles	The Capitol Albums, Volume 2	03.04.06	11.04.06
0946 3 79808 2 8	0946 3 79808 2 8	The Beatles	Love	20.11.06	21.11.06
50999 9 65019 2 4	50999 9 65019 2 4	George Harrison	Let It Roll: Songs by George Harrison	16.06.09	16.06.09

^{21} Not released. Planned release date – 30.05.69. Later issued on Elektra Records as Accept No Substitute. SAPCOR 7 was also earmarked for a 20.06.69 album release by Trash.
^{22} Not issued in the UK. Planned release date – 04.07.69. Only released in Germany, Italy and Japan (with alternate catalogue numbers).
^{23} Regular album release to replace the Box Set package which accompanied the original UK issue.
^{24} From Then to You and The Beatles Christmas Album are the same album, being a collection of the Beatles Fan Club-only Christmas flexi discs issued between 1963 and 1969. Similarly, these two albums were only available to members of "The Beatles Fan Club".
^{25} Only issued in mono despite stereo 'SW' prefix on US release. This album had previously been issued in full on Philles Records in the US and has since been reissued many times on various labels.
^{26} Released in Brazil in mono without the 'S' prefix.
^{27} Planned for release in Brazil in mono without the 'S' prefix but only released in stereo.
^{30} Reissued on vinyl 10.12.96 with "Do You Mind" bonus track. Released in New Zealand as SAPCOR 101.
^{31} This album has since been reissued on various labels.
^{32} This album was reissued in 1977 on Ring O'Records, Catalogue number 2320 104, with different artwork.
^{33} Tetragrammaton catalogue number as EMI refused to distribute.
^{34} Later re-issued on EMI's Music for Pleasure label in the UK with a different catalogue number: Mind Games (MFP 5058) in 1980, Ringo (MFP 50508) in 1980, Dark Horse (MFP 50510) in 1980, Rock 'n' Roll (MFP 50522) in 1981, and Blast from Your Past (MFP 50524) in 1981.
^{35} Later re-issued on EMI's Fame label in the UK with a different catalogue number: Wild Life (FA 3101) in 1984, Red Rose Speedway (FA 3193) in 1987.
^{36} Originally planned for release as STAP-01.
^{43} Pressed in the UK for export only, not released in the UK.
^{52} This is the cassette release of the Dutch LP with catalogue number 5C 052-93536.

=== Zapple Records ===
Zapple was a short-lived subsidiary of Apple designed to release spoken word and avant garde recordings.

Catalogue No.		Artist	Title	Release Date	
UK	US	Artist	Title	UK	US
ZAPPLE 01	ST 3357	John Lennon & Yoko Ono	Unfinished Music No.2: Life with the Lions	09.05.69	26.05.69
ZAPPLE 02	ST 3358	George Harrison	Electronic Sound	09.05.69	26.05.69
ZAPPLE 03	–	Richard Brautigan	Listening to Richard Brautigan ^{[28]}	–	–

^{28} Not released by Zapple. Released by Harvest Records in 1973 (ST-424) and on CD by Collectors' Choice Music in 2005 (CCM-540-2).

== Reissues ==
=== 1990s remasters ===
Apple began the process of reissuing the back catalogue on compact disc in 1991, with many of the CDs containing bonus tracks. By this time, the releases in the UK and US were virtually identical. This list does not include Beatles or solo albums, which were re-released on compact disc by Parlophone or Capitol.

Catalogue No.	Artist	Title	Release Date
CDP 7 97577 2	James Taylor	James Taylor	19.11.91
CDP 7 97578 2	Mary Hopkin	Postcard	19.11.91
CDP 7 97579 2	Badfinger	Magic Christian Music	19.11.91
CDP 7 97580 2	Billy Preston	That's The Way God Planned It	19.11.91
CDP 7 97581 2	Jackie Lomax	Is This What You Want?	19.11.91
CDP 7 97582 2	The Modern Jazz Quartet	Under The Jasmine Tree	19.11.91
CDP 7 98497 2	London Sinfonietta / John Tavener	The Whale	30.06.92
CDP 7 98692 2	The Iveys	Maybe Tomorrow	30.06.92
CDP 7 98695 2	Mary Hopkin	Earth Song/Ocean Song	30.06.92
CDP 7 98698 2	Badfinger	No Dice	30.06.92
CDP 7 98701 2	Doris Troy	Doris Troy	30.06.92
CDP 7 98706 2	George Harrison	Wonderwall Music	30.06.92
0777 7 81252 2	London Sinfonietta / John Tavener	Celtic Requiem	18.05.93
0777 7 81255 2	Radha Krishna Temple	The Radha Krsna Temple	18.05.93
0777 7 81279 2	Billy Preston	Encouraging Words	18.05.93
0777 7 81403 2	Badfinger	Straight Up	01.06.93
0777 7 90428 2	Plastic Ono Band	Live Peace In Toronto 1969	01.05.95
7243 8 30129 2	Badfinger	The Best of Badfinger	31.05.95
7243 8 30197 2	Mary Hopkin	Those Were The Days	31.05.95
7243 8 53816 2	The Modern Jazz Quartet	Space	10.12.96
7243 8 53817 2	Ravi Shankar & Ali Akbar Khan	In Concert 1972	10.12.96
7243 8 53899 2	Badfinger	Ass	10.12.96
7243 8 55239 2	George Harrison	Electronic Sound	10.12.96

=== 2009 remasters ===
2009 saw the remastered reissues of the Beatles back catalogue. A worldwide release date of 9 September 2009 (09.09.09) was set to tie in with the release of The Beatles: Rock Band music video game. Replacing the CD editions which had been issued in 1987, all of the original Beatles albums were reissued in new packaging with mini DVD documentaries and, unlike the 1987 issues, the first four albums (Please Please Me, With The Beatles, A Hard Day's Night and Beatles For Sale) were made available on CD in stereo for the first time. Also, the Past Masters collection of non-album material was now issued as a double CD set, as opposed to the two separate discs issued in 1988. In addition, two box sets were issued, one containing all 16 remastered stereo albums and a second limited edition box set containing the mono mixes of all the albums up to and including The Beatles (the later albums did not receive a separate mono mix). The stereo box also features a DVD "The Mini Documentaries" which contains all the short films that are on the CDs in CD-ROM format.

Although the Apple logo is shown on all the 2009 remasters, the labels on the actual discs are those that appeared on the original LPs. So all the albums from "Please Please Me" through "Sgt. Pepper's Lonely Hearts Club Band" feature a Parlophone label. "Magical Mystery Tour", which was first released in an album version in the US, has a Capitol label. The remaining albums, originally released on Apple, feature the green "A-side" label, excepting "The Beatles" which features the green "A-side" label on disc 1, and the 'white' (cut apple) "B-side" label on disc 2. For the "Past Masters" double-CD set, the first disc has a Parlophone label, and the second disc a green "A-side" Apple label. The DVD that accompanies "The Beatles in Stereo" box set has a red Apple label (similar to that on the original US "Let It Be" LP).

In late 2010, the compilation albums 1962–1966 and 1967–1970 were issued again, in addition a box set "1962–1970" containing both sets, released in the UK and Europe, and a similar box set released in the US with added photo cards and a stamp. Shortly afterwards, the entire remastered catalogue was finally made available to download on iTunes after years of legal wrangling between the Beatles and Apple Inc.

Catalogue No.	Artist	Title	Release Date
0946 3 82413 2 4	The Beatles	A Hard Day's Night	09.09.09
0946 3 82414 2 3	The Beatles	Beatles for Sale	09.09.09
0946 3 82415 2 2	The Beatles	Help!	09.09.09
0946 3 82416 2 1	The Beatles	Please Please Me	09.09.09
0946 3 82417 2 0	The Beatles	Revolver	09.09.09
0946 3 82418 2 9	The Beatles	Rubber Soul	09.09.09
0946 3 82419 2 8	The Beatles	Sgt. Pepper's Lonely Hearts Club Band	09.09.09
0946 3 82420 2 4	The Beatles	With The Beatles	09.09.09
0946 3 82465 2 7	The Beatles	Magical Mystery Tour	09.09.09
0946 3 82466 2 6	The Beatles	The Beatles	09.09.09
0946 3 82467 2 5	The Beatles	Yellow Submarine	09.09.09
0946 3 82468 2 4	The Beatles	Abbey Road	09.09.09
0946 3 82472 2 7	The Beatles	Let It Be	09.09.09
50999 2 43807 2 0	The Beatles	Past Masters	09.09.09
50999 6 99449 0 1	The Beatles	The Beatles in Stereo (16 CD + 1 DVD Box Set) ^{[29]}	09.09.09
50999 6 99451 2 0	The Beatles	The Beatles in Mono (13-CD Box Set)	09.09.09
RED 6266 / 50999 9 06752 2 5	The Beatles	1962–1966	18.10.10
BLUE 6770 / 50999 9 06747 2 3	The Beatles	1967–1970	18.10.10
50999 9 09911 2 7 (UK/Europe)	The Beatles	1962–1970 (Box Set of 1962–1966 + 1967–1970)	07.12.10

^{29} Also available as a USB flash drive. Issued 07.12.09.

=== 2010 remasters ===
With the 1990s reissues out of print, many of the original Apple albums were re-released for a second time in new remastered versions in October 2010. These remasters were also made available on iTunes, just a few weeks before the Beatles back catalogue was finally released for download. Several of the iTunes versions included exclusive tracks not available on the standard CD issue, although these tracks were included on a bonus double CD as part of the Apple Box Set, which collected all of the remastered albums in one package. All of the 2010 remasters had been previously issued in the 1990s reissue programme apart from a 21-track compilation titled Come and Get It: The Best of Apple Records, which included a number of single-only tracks that now received their first official release on compact disc.

Catalogue No.	Artist	Title	Release Date
50999 6 42438 2 5	Badfinger	Magic Christian Music	25.10.10
50999 6 42439 2 4	Badfinger	Ass	25.10.10
50999 6 42440 2 0	Badfinger	Straight Up	25.10.10
50999 6 46397 2 7	Various Artists	Come and Get It – The Best of Apple Records (SAPCOR 29)	25.10.10
50999 9 05807 2 7	Badfinger	No Dice	25.10.10
50999 9 05809 2 5	Mary Hopkin	Postcard	25.10.10
50999 9 05810 2 1	Mary Hopkin	Earth Song/Ocean Song	25.10.10
50999 9 05811 2 0	James Taylor	James Taylor	25.10.10
50999 9 08239 2 3	Billy Preston	Encouraging Words	25.10.10
50999 9 08241 2 8	Billy Preston	That's the Way God Planned It	25.10.10
50999 9 08243 2 6	Doris Troy	Doris Troy	25.10.10
50999 9 08245 2 4	The Modern Jazz Quartet	Under the Jasmine Tree + Space	25.10.10
50999 9 08255 2 1	Jackie Lomax	Is This What You Want?	25.10.10
50999 9 08635 2 3	London Sinfonietta / John Tavener	The Whale + Celtic Requiem	25.10.10
50999 9 17672 2 6	Radha Kṛṣṇa Temple	The Radha Kṛṣṇa Temple	25.10.10
50999 9 18372 2 6	Various Artists	Apple Box Set (17-CD Box Set)	25.10.10
50999 9 18373 2 5	Badfinger/Mary Hopkin/Jackie Lomax	Apple Records Extras (SAPCOR 30)	25.10.10

== See also ==
- Apple Records
- List of record labels
