= Apple 1 =

Apple 1 or Apple One may refer to:

- APPLE 1, Apple Records' UK catalog designation for the Frank Sinatra single "The Lady Is a Champ – But Beautiful"
- Apple I (Apple Computer 1), an 8-bit personal computer electrically designed by Steve Wozniak
- Apple One, a subscription that bundles a number of premium services provided by Apple
- Apple-1, a March 29, 1955, Operation Teapot series test

== See also ==
- Apple (disambiguation)
- 1 (disambiguation)
