= Sour Milk Sea =

- French picture sleeve

Single by Jackie Lomax
- B-side: "The Eagle Laughs at You"
- Released: 26 August 1968
- Recorded: 24–26 June 1968
- Studio: EMI and Trident, London
- Genre: Hard rock, rhythm and blues, psychedelic rock
- Length: 3:54
- Label: Apple
- Songwriter: George Harrison
- Producer: George Harrison

Jackie Lomax singles chronology
"Genuine Imitation Life" (1967)	"Sour Milk Sea" (1968)	"New Day" (1969)

"Sour Milk Sea" is a song written by George Harrison and released by English rock singer Jackie Lomax as his debut single on the Beatles' Apple record label in August 1968. Harrison wrote the song during the Beatles' stay in Rishikesh, India and gave it to Lomax to help launch Apple Records. Lomax's recording is a rarity among non-Beatles songs since it features three members of the band – Harrison, who also produced the track, Ringo Starr and Paul McCartney. Performed in the hard rock style, the song also includes musical contributions from Eric Clapton and session pianist Nicky Hopkins. It was the first of many Harrison productions for artists signed to the Beatles' record label.

Harrison wrote "Sour Milk Sea" to promote Transcendental Meditation, which the Beatles had been studying in Rishikesh with Maharishi Mahesh Yogi. In the lyrics, Harrison espouses meditation as a remedy for worldly cares. The group recorded a demo of the song while considering material for their 1968 double album The Beatles (also known as the White Album). On release, Lomax's single was overshadowed in Apple's "Our First Four" promotional campaign by the Beatles' "Hey Jude" and Mary Hopkin's "Those Were the Days"; it enjoyed only minor success internationally, becoming a top 30 hit in Canada. Together with its B-side, the Lomax-written "The Eagle Laughs at You", the song was included on the singer's only Apple album, Is This What You Want?, released in March 1969.

"Sour Milk Sea" received favourable reviews in 1968 and has continued to invite praise from music critics, particularly for the energetic quality of the performance. Several writers consider that the song deserved to be a hit for Lomax and that, had the Beatles retained it for the White Album, it would have been among the best songs on the album. The track also appears on the 2010 multi-artist compilation Come and Get It: The Best of Apple Records.

== Background and inspiration ==
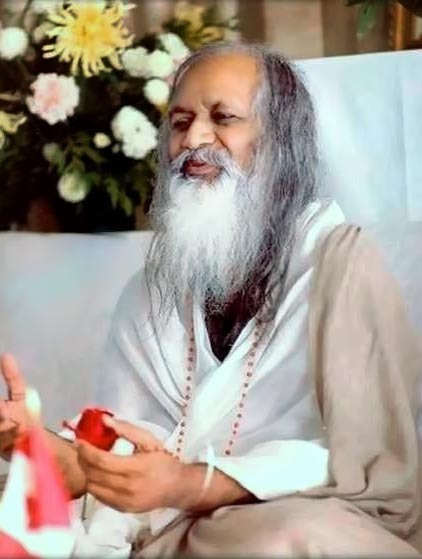
Maharishi Mahesh Yogi, whose teachings inspired the song "Sour Milk Sea"

"Sour Milk Sea" was one of several songs that George Harrison wrote while staying at Maharishi Mahesh Yogi's ashram in Rishikesh, India, from February to April 1968. Having first visited India in September 1966, following the Beatles' final concert tour, Harrison became enamoured of the teachings of the Maharishi and led his Beatles bandmates to Rishikesh to study Transcendental Meditation two years later. With Life magazine labelling 1968 "the Year of the Guru", the Beatles' visit generated wide interest in Transcendental Meditation, and Eastern spirituality generally, among Western youth. Author Simon Leng writes that with "Sour Milk Sea", Harrison adopted "the role of advertising executive" to further promote meditation. Leng views it as a follow-up to "Within You Without You", in which Harrison had first channelled the teachings of the Hindu Vedas into a song.

In his autobiography, I, Me, Mine, Harrison says that "Sour Milk Sea" espouses meditation as a means to improve the quality of one's life, as well as advocating a proactive approach when faced with difficulty. He says he named the composition after a picture titled Kalladadi Samudra, which reflects the theme of Vishvasara Tantra in sacred Hindu texts, particularly regarding "the geological theory of the evolution of organic life on earth". Singer Jackie Lomax, whose debut solo album Harrison had agreed to produce before the Beatles departed for India, said that the Sour Milk Sea symbolises "a fallow period" during each of the Earth's 26,000-year evolutionary cycles, before the planet begins its process of regeneration.

As with the other songs he wrote in Rishikesh, "Sour Milk Sea" marked the start of Harrison's return to the guitar as his main instrument, coinciding with a gradual relinquishing of his attempts to master the Indian sitar. In a September 1968 interview, he recalled that he wrote the music "in ten minutes" since he was without a guitar at the time and had to borrow John Lennon's. He also said that, although it was not until June that he decided to forgo Indian classical music and fully re-engage with rock music, "[Even when] I was in India, I always imagined the song as rock 'n' roll."

== Composition ==
Referring to the compositional draft for "Sour Milk Sea", musicologist Walter Everett states that together the various chords suggest "a pentatonic minor scale on A, allowing B♭ as a tritone-related ornament to E7". The song makes limited use of the expected A major chord, however, instead centring on E over the verses and D in the choruses, with the latter representing what Everett terms "the Mixolydian ♭VII area". Described by author and critic Richie Unterberger as a melody filled with "tense chord ascensions", the composition shares part of its melodic characteristics with "Savoy Truffle", another Harrison song from 1968.

I used "Sour Milk Sea" as the idea of – if you're in the shit, don't go around moaning about it; do something about it:

Looking for release from limitation?
There's nothing much without illumination …
Get out of Sour Milk Sea
You don't belong there …

— George Harrison, 1979

In the lyrics to the verses, Harrison focuses on the benefits of Transcendental Meditation rather than detailing the way to achieve these results. While Leng likens Harrison's approach to that of an advertiser selling anti-dandruff shampoo, author Joshua Greene describes the lyrical thrust of the song as: "Is life getting you down? Not getting the breaks you want? Try illumination." Harrison proffers greater awareness and a release from earthly limitations as the other benefits brought about by the meditation experience.

According to theologian Dale Allison, through its promise of a quick solution, the song pre-empts the concept espoused by Lennon two years later in "Instant Karma!" Harrison urges the listener to follow a "very simple process" and to "do it soon", in order to leave the Sour Milk Sea state of mind and "Get back to where you should be". Author Ian Inglis views the chorus lyrics as particularly forthright; he paraphrases the message as "admit your shortcomings, pull yourself together, look for a solution".

Although it originated as an acoustic guitar song, the official recording of "Sour Milk Sea" is in the heavy rock style typical of the late 1960s. Greene comments on the appropriateness of this "hard-driving, blues guitar medium" as a way for Harrison to directly convey "a simple rule of thumb" regarding the human condition.

== The Beatles' demo ==
"Sour Milk Sea"

Demo by the Beatles

from the album The Beatles: 50th Anniversary Edition
- Released: 9 November 2018
- Recorded: May 1968
- Studio: Kinfauns, Esher
- Genre: Hard rock, blues rock
- Length: 3:43
- Songwriter: George Harrison

The Beatles recorded a demo of "Sour Milk Sea" at Harrison's Esher home, Kinfauns, in late May 1968, while preparing material for their self-titled double album (also known as "the White Album"). By this point, the group had publicly ended their association with the Maharishi. Lennon, who, along with Harrison, was the last to leave Rishikesh, said in mid May that following the Maharishi had been a "mistake" but that the band continued to believe in the benefits of meditation.

The demo was taped on Harrison's Ampex four-track recorder. The performance features Harrison singing falsetto throughout, and a musical backing that includes guitars and percussion. Although the subsequent album sessions were marked by disharmony and a lack of cooperation among the band members, author and critic Kenneth Womack comments that the Kinfauns demos "witness the Beatles working in unison and exalting in the pure joy of their music". Leng similarly describes the group's performance of "Sour Milk Sea" as an "exciting" version "[p]layed with real enthusiasm". The recording became available on bootleg albums, including Acoustic Masterpieces (The Esher Demos). In 2018, it was included on the 50th anniversary box set release of The Beatles, along with all the Esher demos.

As with several of the songs previewed at Kinfauns, the Beatles did not revisit "Sour Milk Sea" during the White Album sessions. Harrison decided to give the song to former Undertakers singer Jackie Lomax – a fellow Liverpudlian and one of the first artists signed to the Beatles' record label, Apple Records, in early 1968. In a 2004 interview, Lomax said that he was fortunate to have Harrison's help, adding: "even on a big project like The White Album he only had four songs. I think he was feeling held back [in the Beatles]." (Note: After his stay in Rishikesh, Harrison's output as a writer had become prolific, yet the extent of his contributions to the Beatles' releases continued to be limited by the band's primary songwriters, Lennon and Paul McCartney.)

== Recording ==
With Harrison as his producer, Lomax recorded "Sour Milk Sea" for release as a single. The sessions for the song began at EMI Studios (now Abbey Road Studios) in London on 24 June 1968, before moving to Trident Studios, to use that facility's superior, eight-track recording equipment. Speaking to Melody Maker in September, Harrison described the recording as a "glorified jam session". (Note: In his interview with the NME that same month, Harrison said that it was when he visited New York in early June that he finally decided to abandon the sitar. He cited the music he heard there, by the Electric Flag and Jimi Hendrix, as his inspiration for dedicating himself to the guitar once more.) The line-up consisted of Lomax on vocals, Harrison and Eric Clapton on guitars, Nicky Hopkins on piano, Paul McCartney on bass, and Ringo Starr on drums. McCartney was absent from the initial session, however, only returning on 25 June from an Apple-related business trip to California. While Apple projects typically featured one member of the Beatles, "Sour Milk Sea" is the only track where more than two members of the band appeared on another artist's recording. (Note: On another occasion, in October 1969, Harrison, Starr and Lennon were all present at Leon Russell's session for "Pisces Apple Lady" at London's Olympic Studios, but Lennon observed rather than participated.)

With Eric Clapton playing on it, it was on fire. When the backing tape was played back, I thought it worked as an instrumental. "You want me to sing on top of that?!"

— Jackie Lomax, 2010

Clapton's electric guitar playing gave the song a riff-based quality that was absent from the Beatles' version. Lomax later said that he thought the track "worked as an instrumental", and he recalled his nervousness when it came to overdubbing the vocal part, with "three Beatles in the control room watching me". In addition to supplying acoustic rhythm guitar on the song, Harrison played an electric guitar solo, which appears shortly after the two-minute mark on the recording, following Clapton's lead guitar break. Hammond organ was also added over this instrumental passage, although the part is uncredited. Recording was completed on 26 June. Like Clapton and Hopkins, Lomax went on to contribute to the sessions for The Beatles, singing backing vocals on "Dear Prudence". (Note: Lomax was also among the chorus singers on the long coda of "Hey Jude", which the Beatles recorded at Trident during sessions for the same album.)

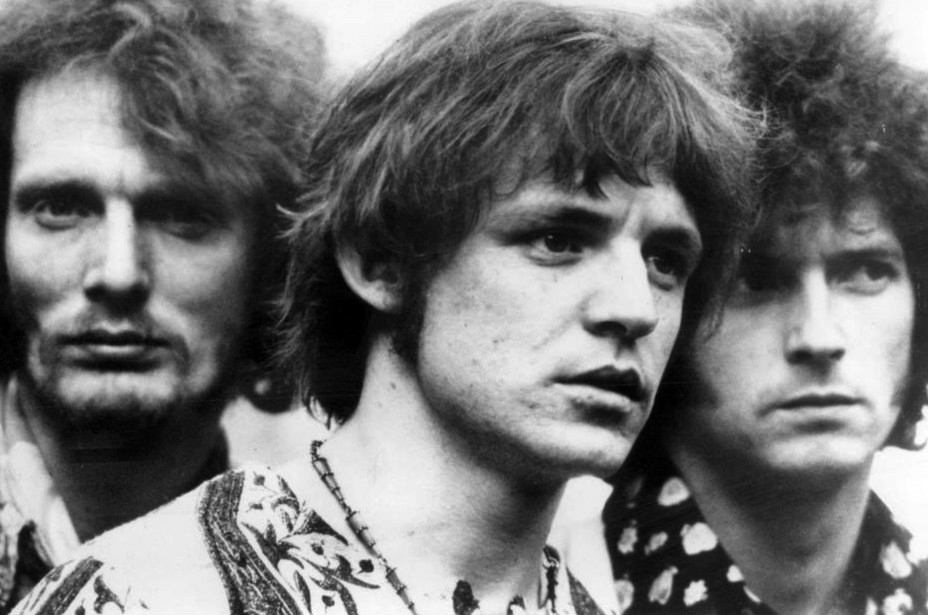
Eric Clapton (far right, pictured with his band Cream) played lead guitar on the track, initiating a guitar combination with Harrison that continued long after the Beatles' break-up in 1970.

Leng identifies "Sour Milk Sea" as marking three important "firsts" in Harrison's career. It was the first song Harrison "gave away" to another artist, a sign that his output as a songwriter had outgrown the quota of tracks typically allocated to him on Beatles releases. The Lomax album project also marked the first time that Harrison served as producer for another artist, after he had produced sessions in London and Bombay for his own debut solo album, Wonderwall Music. (Note: After completing Lomax's album, Harrison went on to produce Apple signings Billy Preston, Brute Force, Radha Krishna Temple (London), Doris Troy, Ronnie Spector, Badfinger, Ravi Shankar and Lon & Derrek Van Eaton.) In addition, although Clapton had contributed to Wonderwall Music earlier in the year, "Sour Milk Sea" is the first example of him and Harrison sharing the lead guitarist's role on a recording. Later in 1968, the pair co-wrote Cream's final hit single, "Badge", while their guitar combination would be a feature through much of Harrison's solo career, as well as on Derek and the Dominos' first single, "Tell the Truth".

=== "The Eagle Laughs at You" ===
For the single's B-side, Lomax recorded his composition "The Eagle Laughs at You". Produced by Harrison, the song was also recorded between 24 and 26 June. According to Apple Records historian Andy Davis, the musicians on the track comprised an "ad hoc power trio" of Lomax on bass and rhythm guitar, Harrison on lead guitar and "a couple of overdubs", and drummer Tony Newman from Sounds Incorporated. Lomax recalled that he and Harrison overdubbed a cornet part (played by a studio cleaner) and then manipulated the recording to make it sound like the call of an elephant.

== Release ==
The "Sour Milk Sea" single was issued on 26 August 1968 in America (as Apple 1802) and 6 September in Britain (as Apple 3). Along with "Hey Jude" by the Beatles, Mary Hopkin's "Those Were the Days" and the Black Dyke Mills Band's "Thingumybob", it was one of Apple's "Our First Four" singles, marking the official launch of the label. The four releases took place on the same day in the United States but were spread out over two weeks in the UK. Apple staged a lavish promotional campaign for the launch, led by Derek Taylor, whom Harrison had invited to help run the Beatles' new enterprise. In advance of the release date, the company declared 11–18 August to be "National Apple Week" and sent gift-wrapped boxes of the four records to Queen Elizabeth II and other members of the royal family, and to the British prime minister. In an interview to help promote "Sour Milk Sea", Harrison said that the song's message would "[go] above the heads of some people", but it was a "very good record" and indicative of his and Lomax's decision to put artistic merit before commercial considerations. (Note: In the same interview, with Alan Smith of the NME, Harrison said that, having enjoyed producing another artist for the first time and rediscovering his "rocker" self, he would welcome the chance to produce Little Richard next.) Lomax carried out radio promotion for the single in November, while he and Harrison were in the US recording further material for Lomax's album, Is This What You Want?

Although the single received considerable promotion, it was a surprising commercial failure. "Sour Milk Sea" failed to chart in Britain. In America, the song reached number 117 during a two-week run on the Bubbling Under listings of Billboard's Hot 100 chart, and "The Eagle Laughs at You" placed at number 125. "Sour Milk Sea" was a hit in Canada, however, peaking at number 29 on the RPM 100 in November 1968. (Note: By comparison, "Hey Jude" became the Beatles' best-selling single and "Those Were the Days" also topped charts around the world. "Thingumybob", a brass-band instrumental, "baffled radio programmers", according to author Bruce Spizer, and failed to meet with any commercial success.) In a 1974 feature on his career in ZigZag magazine, Lomax said that the song's release in tandem with "obvious" hits like "Hey Jude" and "Those Were the Days" jinxed its commercial performance, since radio stations were reluctant to risk alienating other record labels by featuring all four Apple singles too heavily on their playlists. Lomax added: "So they kind of lost me in the shuffle."

The song's exhortation to "Get back to where you should be" was partly appropriated by McCartney in his lyrics to "Get Back", which the Beatles recorded in January 1969. (Note: During early rehearsals of "Get Back", Spizer writes, McCartney also copied Lomax's singing style and, in one run-through, called out "C'mon Jackie".) In March that year, both sides of Lomax's single were included on Is This What You Want?, which was his only album for Apple. The album similarly failed to achieve commercial success, a result that perplexed the Beatles, who continued to believe in Lomax's talents. In June 1971, Apple re-released "Sour Milk Sea", with "Fall Inside Your Eyes" on the B-side, but this single also failed to chart.

In 2010, Apple reissued Is This What You Want? as both an individual release and as part of the seventeen-disc box set titled The Apple Box. "Sour Milk Sea" also appeared on the accompanying two-CD compilation, Come and Get It: The Best of Apple Records. In conjunction with these releases, a mono mix of the song was made available for digital download. Lomax's 2015 box set Rare, Unreleased and Live, 1965–2012 includes live versions of "Sour Milk Sea" and "The Eagle Laughs at You", recorded by him for BBC Radio.

== Critical reception and legacy ==
On release in 1968, the single received favourable reviews from music critics. Derek Johnson of the NME called "Sour Milk Sea" a "raving r-and-b number" that was "powerfully interpreted" by Lomax and "peppered with twangs". Billboard recognised Lomax as a "super discovery" for the new record label and deemed the song a "groovy beat number" with a "powerful vocal workout". Record World included the single among its Four-Star Picks and described the song as "Hard rock from one of the new Beatles protégés" with Lomax "lay[ing] out the thick sound".

Due to the song's strong association with the Beatles and Eric Clapton, it subsequently retained a degree of renown among rock music fans. In 1970, Sour Milk Sea, one of singer Freddie Mercury's pre-Queen bands, named themselves after the track. Writing for Rolling Stone in 1971, Ben Edmonds described the song as "excellent" but said that Lomax "seemed to get lost among the superstars" accompanying him. Three years later, Andy Childs of ZigZag called it "a classic single – a really dynamic rock song with Lomax in great voice".

Although Jackie Lomax had a full and interesting musical career, he was one of Liverpool's unluckiest musicians … his album for the Beatles' Apple label, Is This What You Want (1969), produced by George Harrison, should have been a best-seller. Most music fans of the era cite "Sour Milk Sea" (1968) as a Top 10 single that never was, so why didn't they buy it?

— Spencer Leigh, 2013

Among Beatles biographers, Bruce Spizer attributes the commercial failure of Lomax's "great rock single" to the simultaneous release of "Hey Jude" and "Those Were the Days", while John Winn describes it as an "excellent debut" and "an inexplicable flop". Simon Leng writes that the song "just wasn't catchy enough" in Lomax's reading and views the Beatles' "garage rendition" as superior. Although he finds the musical arrangement and Lomax's singing slightly incongruous beside Harrison's philosophical lyrics, Ian Inglis recognises the track as "an early prototype of heavy metal, particularly in the interplay between drums and lead guitar and its relentless sequence of musical climaxes".

Writing in Goldmine in 2002, Dave Thompson included "Sour Milk Sea" and "Badge" in his list of the Harrison-written songs that "rank among the finest Beatles compositions of the group's final years", and he concluded: "the only regret is that neither of the latter two ever made it into a Beatles recording session." In his book on the making of the White Album, Uncut critic David Quantick describes the song as "excellent" and rues how, together with Harrison's "Not Guilty", it was passed over in favour of "old toot" such as "Rocky Raccoon" and "The Continuing Story of Bungalow Bill". (Note: Quantick also writes that, in the Beatles' demo, "Sour Milk Sea" was already "a belting number, with a superb wailing Harrison vocal and a nice twisty melody that's a superior cousin to 'Savoy Truffle'".) Less impressed with the track, Richie Unterberger finds the lyrics "a blend of encouragement and mild scolding", and rates it "a serviceable hard-rock number with a bluesy boogie feel" next to the "considerably superior" "Savoy Truffle". In an online article for Mojo published shortly after Lomax's death in September 2013, Danny Eccleston described "Sour Milk Sea" as "a brilliantly excitable recording". He said that the single had become a "cult rendering" and attributed its lack of commercial success to an "accusatory tone" in Harrison's lyrics.

In his preview of Apple's 2010 reissues, for Rolling Stone, David Fricke listed Is This What You Want? third among the label's top five non-Beatle album releases and praised "Sour Milk Sea" as a "get-off-your-ass rocker" and a "dynamite" track. Chicago Tribune critic Greg Kot called it "a knockout version". Among reviews of the Come and Get It compilation, Douglas Wolk of Pitchfork opined that "Sour Milk Sea" "would've been one of the best songs on [the White Album] if George had kept it for himself", while Uncut's David Cavanagh described the track as "sensational". AllMusic editor Stephen Thomas Erlewine calls the song "a dense, brilliant, and soulful psychedelic rocker". In his liner notes to the compilation, Andy Davis, formerly the editor of Record Collector, calls "Sour Milk Sea" "the greatest record The Beatles never made".

== Personnel ==
According to John Winn:

- Jackie Lomax – vocals
- George Harrison – acoustic guitar, lead guitar (2nd solo)
- Eric Clapton – lead guitar (1st solo)
- Nicky Hopkins – piano
- Paul McCartney – bass
- Ringo Starr – drums
- uncredited – Hammond organ

== Sources ==
- Dale C. Allison Jr., The Love There That's Sleeping: The Art and Spirituality of George Harrison, Continuum (New York, NY, 2006; ISBN 978-0-8264-1917-0).
- Harry Castleman & Walter J. Podrazik, All Together Now: The First Complete Beatles Discography 1961–1975, Ballantine Books (New York, NY, 1976; ISBN 0-345-25680-8).
- Alan Clayson, George Harrison, Sanctuary (London, 2003; ISBN 1-86074-489-3).
- Peter Doggett, You Never Give Me Your Money: The Beatles After the Breakup, It Books (New York, NY, 2011; ISBN 978-0-06-177418-8).
- The Editors of Rolling Stone, Harrison, Rolling Stone Press/Simon & Schuster (New York, NY, 2002; ISBN 0-7432-3581-9).
- Walter Everett, The Beatles as Musicians: Revolver Through the Anthology, Oxford University Press (New York, NY, 1999; ISBN 0-19-509553-7).
- Philip Goldberg, American Veda: From Emerson and the Beatles to Yoga and Meditation, How Indian Spirituality Changed the West, Harmony Books (New York, NY, 2010; ISBN 978-0-385-52134-5).
- Joshua M. Greene, Here Comes the Sun: The Spiritual and Musical Journey of George Harrison, John Wiley & Sons (Hoboken, NJ, 2006; ISBN 978-0-470-12780-3).
- George Harrison, I Me Mine, Chronicle Books (San Francisco, CA, 2002; ISBN 0-8118-3793-9).
- Chris Ingham, The Rough Guide to the Beatles, Rough Guides/Penguin (London, 2003; ISBN 978-1-84353-140-1).
- Ian Inglis, The Words and Music of George Harrison, Praeger (Santa Barbara, CA, 2010; ISBN 978-0-313-37532-3).
- Lesley-Ann Jones, Mercury: An Intimate Biography of Freddie Mercury, Touchstone (New York, NY, 2011; ISBN 978-1-4516-6395-2).
- Peter Lavezzoli, The Dawn of Indian Music in the West, Continuum (New York, NY, 2006; ISBN 0-8264-2819-3).
- Simon Leng, While My Guitar Gently Weeps: The Music of George Harrison, Hal Leonard (Milwaukee, WI, 2006; ISBN 1-4234-0609-5).
- Mark Lewisohn, The Complete Beatles Recording Sessions: The Official Story of the Abbey Road Years 1962–1970, Bounty Books (London, 2005; ISBN 978-0-7537-2545-0).
- Ian MacDonald, Revolution in the Head: The Beatles' Records and the Sixties, Pimlico (London, 1998; ISBN 0-7126-6697-4).
- Barry Miles, The Beatles Diary Volume 1: The Beatles Years, Omnibus Press (London, 2001; ISBN 0-7119-8308-9).
- Mojo Special Limited Edition: 1000 Days of Revolution (The Beatles' Final Years – Jan 1, 1968 to Sept 27, 1970), Emap (London, 2003).
- Chris O'Dell with Katherine Ketcham, Miss O'Dell: My Hard Days and Long Nights with The Beatles, The Stones, Bob Dylan, Eric Clapton, and the Women They Loved, Touchstone (New York, NY, 2009; ISBN 978-1-4165-9093-4).
- David Quantick, Revolution: The Making of the Beatles' White Album, A Cappella Books (Chicago, IL, 2002; ISBN 1-55652-470-6).
- Nicholas Schaffner, The Beatles Forever, McGraw-Hill (New York, NY, 1978; ISBN 0-07-055087-5).
- Stuart Shea & Robert Rodriguez, Fab Four FAQ: Everything Left to Know About the Beatles ... and More!, Hal Leonard (New York, NY, 2007; ISBN 978-1-4234-2138-2).
- Bruce Spizer, The Beatles on Apple Records, 498 Productions (New Orleans, LA, 2003; ISBN 0-9662649-4-0).
- Bruce Spizer, The Beatles Solo on Apple Records, 498 Productions (New Orleans, LA, 2005; ISBN 0-9662649-5-9).
- Doug Sulpy & Ray Schweighardt, Get Back: The Unauthorized Chronicle of The Beatles' Let It Be Disaster, St. Martin's Griffin (New York, NY, 1997; ISBN 0-312-19981-3).
- Stefanie Syman, The Subtle Body: The Story of Yoga in America, Farrar, Straus and Giroux (New York, NY, 2010; ISBN 978-0-374-23676-2).
- Richie Unterberger, The Unreleased Beatles: Music & Film, Backbeat Books (San Francisco, CA, 2006; ISBN 978-0-87930-892-6).
- John C. Winn, That Magic Feeling: The Beatles' Recorded Legacy, Volume Two, 1966–1970, Three Rivers Press (New York, NY, 2009; ISBN 978-0-307-45239-9).
- Kenneth Womack, The Beatles Encyclopedia: Everything Fab Four, ABC-CLIO (Santa Barbara, CA, 2014; ISBN 978-0-313-39171-2).
