= Brother (Lon & Derrek Van Eaton album) =

Studio album by Lon & Derrek Van Eaton
- Released: September 22, 1972 (US); February 9, 1973 (UK)
- Recorded: October 1971–mid 1972
- Studio: Apple Studios, London; Abbey Road Studios, London; Bell Sound, New York
- Genre: Pop rock, pop-soul
- Label: Apple
- Producer: Klaus Voormann, George Harrison

Lon & Derrek Van Eaton chronology
Brother (1972)	Who Do You Out Do (1975)

Singles from Brother
- 1. "Sweet Music" Released: March 6, 1972 (US); 2. "Warm Woman" Released: March 9, 1973 (UK)

Brother is the debut album by the American pop-rock duo Lon & Derrek Van Eaton. It was released on the Beatles' Apple record label in September 1972 in the United States and February 1973 in Britain. It includes the single "Sweet Music", produced by George Harrison, and was otherwise produced by Klaus Voormann, a friend and longtime associate of the Beatles. On release, the album received favorable reviews from music critics but failed to achieve commercial success. Rolling Stone critic Stephen Holden hailed it as a "staggeringly impressive first album".

Brother was the Van Eatons' only album for Apple, after which the duo briefly recorded for A&M Records. The album was reissued on CD in 2012 with nine bonus tracks, including outtakes from the sessions and an alternate mix of "Sweet Music".

== Background ==
In March 1971, Lon and Derrek Van Eaton left the band Jacobs Creek, with whom they had recorded a self-titled album for CBS Records in 1969. The two brothers then concentrated on songwriting, and recorded a series of demos on a pair of standard tape machines at home, in their rented house on North Hermitage Avenue in Trenton, New Jersey. Led by younger brother Derrek's vocals, the Van Eatons sang and played all the instruments on the recordings, using various surfaces of the house to replicate drum sounds. Their manager, Robin Garb, forwarded seven of the songs on to various record company A&R departments, one of which was the New York office of the Beatles' Apple label, run by Allan Steckler. George Harrison listened to the tape and liked what he heard, as did John Lennon.

In June 1971, Apple wrote to Garb to tell him of Harrison's interest in the demos. Two weeks later, the brothers received a phone call from Harrison, inviting them to record for the label; they then met him when he was in New York for the Concert for Bangladesh. On September 19, the Van Eatons and Garb flew to London, and on September 30, they attended the launch party for the refurbished Apple Studios on Savile Row in the company of Harrison, bassist Klaus Voormann, and Pete Ham of the Apple band Badfinger. The brothers became the first artists to record at the new facility, and one of the final acts signed by Apple Records.

== Recording ==
=== London ===
Harrison was preoccupied with his Bangladesh charity project during the second half of 1971 and through much of 1972, and so entrusted the Van Eatons' development to Voormann, a longstanding friend of the Beatles. In November 1971, Billboard magazine announced that Voormann would produce the brothers' releases for Apple. Harrison produced their first recording, however – "Sweet Music", which he had earmarked as their debut single. (Note: When the brothers first arrived in the UK and were driven to Harrison's home, Friar Park, he was waiting for them on his lawn, playing "Sweet Music" on a guitar.)

Working at Abbey Road Studios, Harrison invited a number of famous friends to play on "Sweet Music": Peter Frampton joined the Van Eatons on a third acoustic guitar, and Ringo Starr and Jim Gordon played drums. Aside from Mike Hugg on harmonium, Lon and Derrek played all the other instruments on the track, including electric piano, bass guitar and tenor saxophone. (Note: Harrison also played guitar when they were rehearsing the song in the studio. He suggested adding an E7 chord to introduce the chorus, which Lon later described as "a very good musical idea, and we did from then on".) The recording engineer was Phil McDonald, who had worked with the Beatles and then with Harrison on his 1970 solo album All Things Must Pass. The result was reminiscent of Harrison's All Things Must Pass track "Isn't It a Pity". Music journalist Jay Lustig describes "Sweet Music" as "a dreamy, utopian ballad", while Beatles biographer Robert Rodriguez calls it "a fine Harrisonian-sounding single".

The brothers then recorded at Apple Studios with Voormann, and with Starr participating on some songs. Geoff Emerick, who managed the studio, was the recording engineer at the early sessions there. He later wrote of the Van Eatons: "their problem was that they couldn't match the feel of the demonstration tape that had gotten them their record deal in the first place ... in recording studio parlance, it's a phenomenon known as 'chasing the demo.'" Emerick also recalled that he and Voormann did not get along. Emerick soon left the project and was replaced by another Apple sound engineer. (Note: Emerick believed that, as an associate of Paul McCartney's more than of the other former Beatles, he was often marginalized within the Apple hierarchy. Earlier in 1971, Emerick's recordings with Badfinger were rejected for release by Steckler in New York, leading to Harrison replacing him as producer of the band's third album, Straight Up.) The album credits list John Mills as the recording engineer for all the tracks recorded at Apple Studios.

Lon recalled in 2010 that the recording process for Brother was far more conducive to creating music than when they had made their album with Jacobs Creek in New York, where "Simon and Garfunkel had the studio at will, so sometimes even if we were recording, they could decide they needed to come in and kick us out. We literally had the Apple studios to ourselves." For the song "Warm Woman", the brothers' original demo was used rather than a new studio recording.

=== New York ===
The "Sweet Music" single was released in America in advance of the album, on March 6, 1972 (as Apple 1845). The B-side was "Song of Songs", produced by Voormann and recorded at Apple. "Sweet Music" received highly favorable reviews; Record World magazine said it was "a stirring ballad that will make them immediate chart contenders" and added: "Production by George Harrison couldn't be better. Just right for today's market." The single failed to attract airplay or find any commercial success, however. Harrison was flummoxed by this, declaring in a telegram to Apple's marketing staff: "What the !!!!! is the matter out there? 'Sweet Music' is a No. 1 Hit!" In response to Harrison's complaints about Apple's lack of promotion for the single, the brothers were called to Allen Klein's office in New York and asked what the company could do to help them. In Lon's recollection, "We didn't know what to say. We asked for more studio time."

Further sessions for Brother took place at Bell Sound in New York. The musicians on these recordings included Andy Newmark, on drums, and T.J. Tindall, lead guitarist with the Edison Electric Band and another Trenton musician. Four songs from the Bell Sound sessions were used on the album, replacing three of the tracks recorded in London.

== Release ==
Brother was released on September 22, 1972, in the United States with the Apple catalog number SMAS 3390. It contained "Sweet Music" and ten other songs written by the Van Eatons. Apple supplied lavish artwork for the LP. The cover photo of the brothers was taken by photographer Clive Arrowsmith. Voormann, an established artist and designer, created a novelty zoetrope insert. When placed on a turntable, the insert created moving images of the brothers, showing them playing guitar and drums. Apple's advertising for the album carried the tagline "With good vibrations from Ringo Starr, George Harrison, Klaus Voormann, Mike Hugg, Jim Gordon and T.J. Tindall".

Brother met the same commercial fate as "Sweet Music" and failed to chart. The brothers attributed this to Apple's inadequate promotion of the release; author Stan Soocher cites its commercial failure as a "case in point" that demonstrates Klein's ineffective management of the label during the early 1970s. The album was released in the UK on February 9, 1973 (as Apple SAPCOR 25). "Sweet Music" had not been issued as a single there. Apple released "Warm Woman" as a single in the UK on March 9. By that time, the Van Eatons and Badfinger were the only artists still under contract to Apple Records, apart from the individual former Beatles and Yoko Ono. With the label in decline, Harrison helped the brothers relocate to Los Angeles, where they later recorded for A&M Records.

=== Reissue ===
Brother remained out of print for almost 40 years following Apple's closure in the mid-1970s. In October 2010, "Sweet Music" was included on the Apple compilation Come and Get It: The Best of Apple Records, but Brother was one of the albums omitted from the reissue campaign that generated the compilation. In an interview at that time, Lon said he had repeatedly been asked whether the album would be issued on CD, and that it was "a dream of mine to finally see it happen". Brother was finally reissued on June 25, 2012, on Cherry Red Records' RPM imprint, which had licensed the recordings from Apple.

The reissue added nine bonus tracks, including the 1972 B-side "Song of Songs", various demos and session outtakes, and a remix of "Sweet Music". One of the songs, "The Sea", features a string arrangement by composer John Tavener, who Starr signed to Apple Records in the early 1970s. Apple historian Stefan Granados supplied the liner notes in the CD booklet. Further previously unreleased recordings from the Van Eatons' time with Apple were included on their late 2012 release Anthology 1968–2012.

== Critical reception ==
=== Contemporary reviews ===
Brother received favorable reviews from music critics. Billboard's reviewer said that the brothers' abilities as vocalists and songwriters "shine through" regardless of the big-name contributors to the album. The reviewer highlighted "Sunshine" among the best songs, describing it as "fine rock with hit possibilities".

Stephen Holden of Rolling Stone wrote: "This staggeringly impressive first album ... displays more energy, good feeling, and sheer musical talent than any debut rock record I've heard this year. It's no wonder that Apple signed the brothers to a five-year contract simply on the basis of a homemade tape." He admired the range and versatility of Derrek's singing and said that the Van Eatons' "combined talent makes them far more than the equivalent of a gutsy Todd Rundgren or Harry Nilsson". Holden found the album's music "frankly derivative", with Stevie Wonder, the Rolling Stones, George Harrison and Paul McCartney among the most obvious influences, yet it was "of such a high order as to pay one-to-one tribute to its sources rather than simply to parody or rip them off".

=== Retrospective assessment and legacy ===
Professional ratings
Review scores
Source	Rating
AllMusic	3.5/5 stars
Record Collector	4/5 stars

Robert Rodriguez describes the Van Eatons as arguably the closest that Apple Records came to delivering on its initial promise of "plucking unknowns from obscurity" and launching them as successful recording artists, due to the brothers having come to the label's attention via a demo tape rather than through any personal connection to a member of the Beatles' circle. Reviewing the 2012 Brother reissue, for AllMusic, Richie Unterberger remarks on the similarities of the Van Eatons' sound with that of Badfinger and McCartney, and describes the album as "on the pleasantly innocuous side as a whole". Oregano Rathbone of Record Collector says that Brother merits "special mention" among the many Apple albums that failed to achieve success, since it "not only lures Apple's core collectors with its Abbey Road-vintage production tropes ... and impassioned, Badfingeresque bedrock of sweet grit, but also stands proud as a 70s pop-soul paradigm in its own right". Rathbone admires the "vibey, soul-shack" performance of "Warm Woman" and credits "More Than Words" with anticipating "the bruised, dysfunctional Big Star of Sister Lovers".

Writing for The Arts Desk, Kieron Tyler says that "Sweet Music" is the "standout" on an album that, at the time, "realised every aspiring musician's dream". In his description, Brother "balances Harrison-esque pop with post-Band rusticity, and is an essential part of the Beatle jigsaw". Writing for the reissues website The Second Disc, Joe Marchese similarly views "Sweet Music" as the "centerpiece" and he highlights "The Sea" among the bonus tracks as a "fascinating collaboration" with Tavener. Marchese describes the reissue as long overdue and "a landmark release that fills a major gap in the always-ripe Apple catalogue". Among others reviews of the 2012 reissue, John Blaney of Shindig! admired the soaring quality of the brothers' "sweet, high vocals", and Alan Jones wrote in Music Week: "it is an album that has survived the passing of nearly 40 years very well. Stylistically encompassing pop, rock and R&B, Brother is never less than impressive …"

In 2015, Rolling Stone included Brother in its list of the "20 Rock Albums Rolling Stone Loved in the 1970s That You Never Heard". Gavin Edwards said that the album demonstrated the Van Eatons' "Beatlesque level of musical finesse" and he repeated Holden's contention from 1972 that it "might just be the perfect studio album".

== Track listing ==
All songs written by Lon and Derrek Van Eaton.

=== Original release ===
Side one

1. "Warm Woman" – 3:01
2. "Sun Song" – 3:57
3. "More Than Words" – 2:16
4. "Hear My Cry" – 3:00
5. "Without the Lord" – 1:37
6. "Sweet Music" – 3:41

Side two

7. "Help Us All" – 2:53
8. "Maybe There's Another" – 2:42
9. "Ring" – 2:24
10. "Sunshine" – 3:48
11. "Another Thought" – 3:41

=== 2012 reissue ===
Tracks 1–11 per sides one and two of the original album, with the following bonus tracks:

12. "Home Dear Home" [album outtake]
13. "The Sea" [album outtake]
14. "Song of Songs"
15. "Another Thought" [Version 2, album outtake]
16. "Sweet Music" [remix]
17. "Livin'" [album outtake]
18. "Can't Wait'" [album outtake]
19. "Resurrection" [demo]

== Personnel ==
- Lon Van Eaton – vocals, piano, electric and acoustic guitars, saxophone, drums, horn and string arrangements
- Derrek Van Eaton – lead vocals, bass, flute, acoustic guitar, drums
- Ringo Starr – drums (6, 11)
- Peter Frampton – acoustic guitar (6)
- Klaus Voormann – bass (11), cover design
- Mike Hugg – harmonium (6)
- Jim Gordon – drums (6)
- T.J. Tindall – electric guitar (4, 9, 11)
- Paul Glanz – organ (4, 7, 9)
- Andy Newmark – drums (4, 7, 9)
- Alexis Guevara – congas (4, 9)
- Richard Davis – standup bass (7)

== Sources ==
- Badman, Keith (2001). The Beatles Diary Volume 2: After the Break-Up 1970–2001. London: Omnibus Press. ISBN 978-0-7119-8307-6.
- Castleman, Harry; Podrazik, Walter J. (1976). All Together Now: The First Complete Beatles Discography 1961–1975. New York, NY: Ballantine Books. ISBN 0-345-25680-8.
- Doggett, Peter (2011). You Never Give Me Your Money: The Beatles After the Breakup. New York, NY: It Books. ISBN 978-0-06-177418-8.
- Emerick, Geoff; Massey, Howard (2006). Here, There and Everywhere: My Life Recording the Music of the Beatles. New York, NY: Gotham Books. ISBN 978-1-59240-269-4.
- Leng, Simon (2006). While My Guitar Gently Weeps: The Music of George Harrison. Milwaukee, WI: Hal Leonard. ISBN 978-1-4234-0609-9.
- Madinger, Chip; Easter, Mark (2000). Eight Arms to Hold You: The Solo Beatles Compendium. Chesterfield, MO: 44.1 Productions. ISBN 0-615-11724-4.
- Matovina, Dan (2000). Without You: The Tragic Story of Badfinger. San Mateo, CA: Frances Glover Books. ISBN 0-9657122-2-2.
- Rodriguez, Robert (2010). Fab Four FAQ 2.0: The Beatles' Solo Years, 1970–1980. Milwaukee, WI: Backbeat Books. ISBN 978-1-4165-9093-4.
- Rodriguez, Robert (2013). Solo in the 70s: John, Paul, George, Ringo: 1970–1980. Downers Grove, IL: Parading Press. ISBN 978-0-9892555-0-9.
- Soocher, Stan (2015). Baby You're a Rich Man: Suing the Beatles for Fun and Profit. Lebanon, NH: University Press of New England. ISBN 978-1-61168-380-6.
- Spizer, Bruce (2005). The Beatles Solo on Apple Records. New Orleans, LA: 498 Productions. ISBN 0-9662649-5-9.
