= The Longest Cocktail Party =

1972 book by Richard DiLello

- First edition (UK)
- Author: Richard DiLello
- Language: English
- Subject: Music
- Genre: Non-fiction
- Published: 1972
- Publisher: Charisma
- Publication place: United States
- ISBN: 1-84195-602-3

The Longest Cocktail Party is a book by Richard DiLello, published in 1972 by Playboy Press in the US and Canada and Charisma in the UK, and reprinted in 1981, 1983 (Pierian Press), 1997 (Popular Culture Ink) and 2005. The Longest Cocktail Party is DiLello's account of the history of the Beatles' company Apple Corps, the break-up of the Beatles, and the beginning of their solo careers.

== Background ==
The title is a reference to the press office's habit of entertaining members of the media, and the company's potential business partners, with expensive drinks, luncheons and perks – which ultimately led to a financial and spiritual hangover, as did the unrealised potential of the company.

DiLello served as the "house hippie" (formally termed Client Liaison Officer; a sort of in-house youth consultant and gofer) at Apple's Savile Row headquarters, from 1968 until 1970, becoming one-on-one acquainted with each of the Beatles, many of their wives and girlfriends, and also the inner circle of agents, managers, and others who worked for and with Apple. These included business manager Allen Klein, lawyers Lee Eastman and John Eastman, road managers (and Apple directors) Mal Evans and Neil Aspinall, press agent and author Derek Taylor, members of Apple bands Badfinger and White Trash, the staff, and the countless visitors to the office.

== Content ==
DiLello covers events including the launching parties for Apple Records and artists like White Trash and Mary Hopkin, the ill-fated Apple Christmas party in 1968 (with two Hells Angels as guests), the Beatles' rooftop concert appearing in Let It Be, the lawsuits that began as the Beatles grew apart, and finally the closing of the Apple press office.

The several appendices to the book include the full text of the self-penned "interview" issued by Paul McCartney with the pre-release copies of his first solo album (McCartney), that effectively announced the band's breakup in April 1970; a discography of Apple Records releases; a list of the Beatles' achievements as recording artists; and text of several British news articles about Apple.

== Aftermath and legacy ==
In addition to shooting the cover portrait of Badfinger for their Straight Up album, DiLello also went on to write the screenplay for the 1983 Sean Penn film, Bad Boys; as well as the story for the 1988 Dennis Hopper film, Colors.

On 7 May 2010, it was announced that the book was to be made into a feature film by Liam Gallagher's In 1 Productions with Michael Winterbottom set to direct, but as of 2025, the film has yet to be released.

In 2015, the book was re-released by Alfred Music. This officially authorized edition features a new foreword written by DiLello.
