= Come and Get It: The Best of Apple Records =

Compilation album by various artists
- Released: 25 October 2010
- Recorded: 1968–71
- Genres: Pop; rock
- Length: 71:35
- Label: Apple
- Producers: Peter Asher; Tony Cox; George Harrison; John Lennon; Paul McCartney; Tony Meehan; Yoko Ono; Phil Spector; Tony Visconti

Professional ratings
Review scores
Source	Rating
AllMusic	4/5 stars
American Songwriter	3/5 stars
BBC	(favourable)
The Independent	2/5 stars
Mojo	3/5 stars
Pitchfork Media	8.5/10
PopMatters	7/10 stars
Tom Hull	B−
Uncut	3/5 stars

Come and Get It: The Best of Apple Records is a greatest hits compilation album containing songs by artists signed to the Beatles' Apple record label between 1968 and 1973. The first and currently only such multi-artist Apple compilation, it was released on 25 October 2010. Among the artists are Badfinger, Mary Hopkin, James Taylor, Billy Preston, Jackie Lomax, Ronnie Spector and Hot Chocolate. In most cases, the recordings were produced or written by one of the Beatles, with George Harrison and Paul McCartney being the most heavily represented on the album.

The compilation accompanied a massive campaign by Apple Corps and EMI to reissue the albums originally released by the Beatles' record label, and the project and remastered albums are led by the same team of engineers that worked on the Beatles' 2009 remastered albums, John Lennon's 2010 remastered albums, and sixteen other 2010 remastered albums by various other artists (a song from each of these sixteen albums is on Come and Get It: The Best of Apple Records).

== Track listing ==
No.	Title	Writer(s)	Artist	Length
1.	"Those Were the Days"	Gene Raskin	Mary Hopkin	5:11
2.	"Carolina in My Mind"	James Taylor	James Taylor	3:38
3.	"Maybe Tomorrow"	Tom Evans	The Iveys	2:53
4.	"Thingumybob"	Lennon–McCartney	The Black Dyke Mills Band	1:56
5.	"King of Fuh"	Brute Force	Brute Force	3:04
6.	"Sour Milk Sea"	George Harrison	Jackie Lomax	3:54
7.	"Goodbye"	Lennon–McCartney	Mary Hopkin	2:25
8.	"That's the Way God Planned It"	Preston	Billy Preston	3:26
9.	"New Day"	Lomax	Jackie Lomax	2:52
10.	"Golden Slumbers"/"Carry That Weight"	Lennon–McCartney	Trash	4:05
11.	"Give Peace a Chance"	John Lennon (Note: Originally credited to Lennon–McCartney)	Hot Chocolate	4:33
12.	"Come and Get It"	Paul McCartney	Badfinger	2:21
13.	"Ain't That Cute"	Harrison, Troy	Doris Troy	3:49
14.	"My Sweet Lord"	Harrison	Billy Preston	3:22
15.	"Try Some, Buy Some"	Harrison	Ronnie Spector	4:12
16.	"Govinda"	trad., arr. Mukunda Das Adhikary	Radha Krishna Temple	4:46
17.	"We're On Our Way"	Hodge	Chris Hodge	2:59
18.	"Saturday Nite Special"	Darrell Higginbotham	The Sundown Playboys	2:12
19.	"God Save Us"	John Lennon, Yoko Ono	Bill Elliot & the Elastic Oz Band	3:11
20.	"Sweet Music"	Lon & Derrek Van Eaton	Lon & Derrek Van Eaton	3:37
21.	"Day After Day"	Peter Ham	Badfinger	3:09
Total length:				71:35
