= Apple Records =

UK international record label; imprint of Apple Corps Ltd.

- Parent company: Apple Corps
- Founded: 1968; 58 years ago
- Founder: The Beatles
- Defunct: 1976 (briefly)
- Distributors: Calderstone Productions; Capitol Records; Universal Music Group
- Genre: Pop; progressive rock; psychedelic rock; Indian; experimental; classical; folk
- Country of origin: United Kingdom

Apple Records is a British record label founded by the Beatles in 1968 as a division of Apple Corps Ltd. It was initially intended as a creative outlet for the Beatles, both as a group and individually, plus a selection of other artists including Mary Hopkin, James Taylor, Badfinger, and Billy Preston. In practice, the roster had become dominated by the mid-1970s with releases of the former Beatles as solo artists. Allen Klein managed the label from 1969 to 1973, then it was managed by Neil Aspinall on behalf of the Beatles and their heirs. Aspinall retired in 2007 and was replaced by Jeff Jones. Jones stepped down on 21 October 2024 and was replaced by Tom Greene in September 2025.

== History ==
=== 1967–1969: early years ===
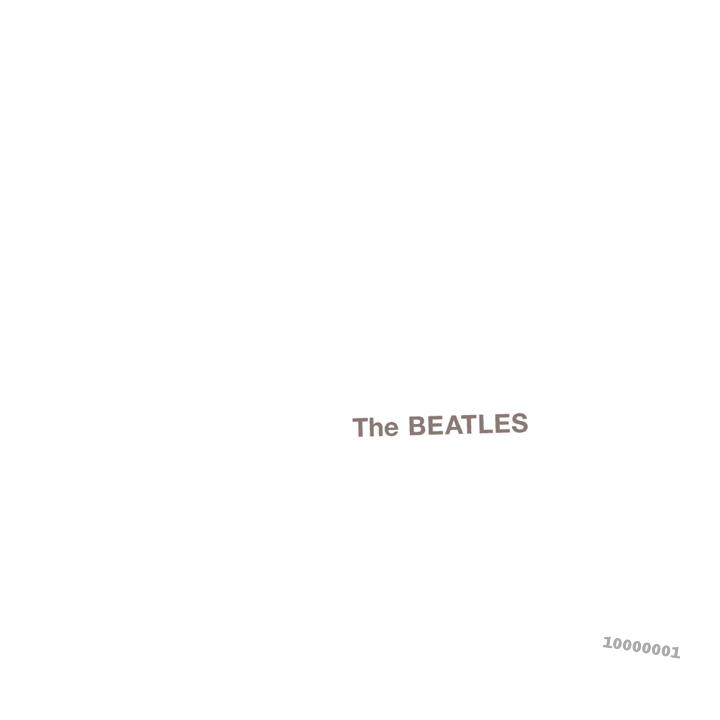
The Beatles was the band's first album on Apple Records.

Apple Corps Ltd was conceived by the Beatles in 1967 after the death of their manager Brian Epstein. It was intended to be a small group of companies (Apple Retail, Apple Publishing, Apple Electronics, and so on) as part of Epstein's plan to create a tax-effective business structure. The first project that the band released after forming the company was their film Magical Mystery Tour, which was produced under the Apple Films division. Apple Records was officially founded by the group after their return from India in 1968 as another sub-division of Apple Corps.

At this time, the Beatles were contracted to EMI. In a new distribution deal, EMI and its US subsidiary Capitol Records agreed to distribute Apple Records until 1976, while EMI retained ownership of their recordings. Beatles recordings issued in the United Kingdom on the Apple label carried Parlophone catalogue numbers, while US issues carried Capitol catalogue numbers. Apple Records owns the rights to all of the Beatles' videos and movie clips, and the rights to recordings of other artists signed to the label. The first Apple catalogue number 1 was a single pressing of Frank Sinatra singing "Maureen Is a Champ" (with lyrics by Sammy Cahn) to the melody of "The Lady Is a Tramp" as a surprise gift for the 21st birthday of Ringo Starr's wife Maureen.

Apple Records and Apple Publishing signed a number of acts whom the Beatles personally discovered or supported, and one or more of the Beatles would be involved in the recording sessions in most cases. Several notable artists were signed in the first year, including James Taylor, Mary Hopkin, Billy Preston, the Modern Jazz Quartet, the Iveys (who became Badfinger), Doris Troy, and former Liverpool singer Jackie Lomax who recorded George Harrison's "Sour Milk Sea".

=== 1969–1973: Klein era ===
In 1969, the Beatles were in need of financial and managerial direction, and John Lennon was approached by Allen Klein, manager of the Rolling Stones. When Klein went on to manage Apple, three of the Beatles supported him with Paul McCartney being the only group member opposed to his involvement. McCartney had suggested his father-in-law Lee Eastman for the job.

Klein took control of Apple and shut down several sub-divisions, including Apple Electronics, and he dropped some of Apple Records' artistic roster. New signings to the label were not so numerous afterward and tended to arrive through the individual actions of the former Beatles. For example, Elephant's Memory were recruited through Lennon and Ravi Shankar through Harrison. McCartney had little input into Apple Records' roster after 1970. Klein managed Apple Corps until March 1973, when his contract expired. The Beatles' entire pre-Apple catalogue on the Capitol label was re-issued on the Apple label in May 1971, including the singles from "I Want to Hold Your Hand" to "Lady Madonna", and the albums from Meet the Beatles! to Magical Mystery Tour. The album covers remained unchanged with the Capitol logos.

=== 1973–2007: Aspinall era, Beatles reissues ===
After Klein's departure, Apple was managed by Neil Aspinall on behalf of the four Beatles and their heirs. Apple Records' distribution contract with EMI expired in 1976, when control of the Beatles' catalogue—including solo recordings to date by George Harrison, John Lennon and Ringo Starr—reverted to EMI (Paul McCartney had acquired ownership of his solo recordings when he re-signed with Capitol in 1975).

The original UK versions of the Beatles' albums were released worldwide by EMI on compact disc in 1987 and 1988 on the Parlophone label. Previously, Abbey Road had been issued in Japan on CD in 1983 on the Toshiba-EMI label. Although this was a legitimate release, it was not authorised by the Beatles, EMI or Apple Corps. Following the settlement of Apple's ten-year lawsuit against EMI in 1989, new projects began to move forward, including the Live at the BBC album and The Beatles Anthology series. It was after the Anthology project (spearheaded by Neil Aspinall) that the company resumed making significantly large profits again and began its revival.

The label was again newsworthy in 2006, as the long-running dispute between Apple Records' parent company and Apple Inc. went to the High Court (see Apple Corps v Apple Computer).

=== 2007–present: Jones era, iTunes reissues ===
In 2007, longtime chief executive Neil Aspinall retired and was replaced by American music industry executive Jeff Jones. The Beatles' catalog was remastered and re-issued in September 2009 and was made available on iTunes in November 2010. In June 2009, Apple Records published their last album, Let it Roll: Songs by George Harrison. When Universal Music Group acquired EMI and the Beatles' recorded music catalogue, Calderstone Productions was formed in 2012 to administer the Beatles' catalogue.

In October 2024 it was announced that Jeff Jones would be stepping down as CEO of Apple.

== Design ==
=== Origin ===
During the sixties, Paul McCartney discovered the work of Belgian surrealist René Magritte. As an admirer, McCartney started to collect paintings of the artist.

In 1967, a friend bought “Le Jeu De Mourre” for Paul McCartney. The work represents a green apple with the text Au Revoir placed on top. When McCartney saw it for the first time, he was impressed by the iconic look of the image. The big green apple later became the inspiration for the Apple Records company logo. To this day, McCartney still owns the 1966 painting.

=== Apple label ===
German release of The Iveys' album Maybe Tomorrow

Standard Apple album and single labels displayed a bright green Granny Smith apple on the A-side, while the flipside displayed the cross section of the apple. The bright green apple returned for Beatles CDs releases in the 1990s, following initial CD releases by Parlophone.

On the US issue of the Beatles' Let It Be album, the Granny Smith apple was red. The album was manufactured and distributed by United Artists Records and not Capitol Records; for contractual reasons, the red apple was used to mark the difference. The red apple also appeared on the back cover, and on the 2009 remastered edition back cover. Capitol's parent company EMI purchased United Artists Records in the late 1970s, and Capitol gained the American rights to the Let It Be soundtrack album (along with the American rights to another, earlier, United Artists Beatles movie soundtrack LP, 1964's A Hard Day's Night).

Aside from the red apple, other examples in which the apple has been altered include George Harrison's album All Things Must Pass triple album, on which the first two discs have orange apples while the third has a jar label reading Apple Jam; black and white apples on John Lennon's album John Lennon/Plastic Ono Band and Yoko Ono's album Yoko Ono/Plastic Ono Band; a blue apple on Ringo Starr's single "Back Off Boogaloo"; Harrison's album Extra Texture (Read All About It), on which the apple (in shrunken cartoon form) is eaten away at its core (this was intended to be a joke because it was released at a time when Apple Records was beginning to fold); and a red apple on Starr's compilation album Blast from Your Past. Other types of apples were also used: in 1971, for Lennon's Imagine and Ono's Fly, the apples respectively featured pictures of Lennon and Ono, as did the apples for Ono's 1973 Approximately Infinite Universe and the singles that were released from these three albums.

== Zapple Records ==
The Zapple label of George Harrison's Electronic Sound LP (US issue)

Zapple Records, an Apple Records subsidiary run by Barry Miles, a friend of McCartney, was intended as an outlet for the release of spoken word and avant-garde records, as a budget label in the style of a magazine or journal. It was active only from 3 February 1969 until June 1969; a string of projects were announced, and a number of recording sessions undertaken, but only two albums were released on the label, both by solo Beatles, while another two LPs of finished material were issued by other labels after Zapple was closed down. The label was launched with the two Beatle-related records: Lennon and Ono's avant garde Unfinished Music No. 2: Life with the Lions (Zapple 1), and George Harrison's Electronic Sound (Zapple 2). An album of readings by Richard Brautigan was recorded and mixed for release as Zapple 3, and acetate disc copies and test pressings were cut, but, said Miles, "The Zapple label was folded by [Allen] Klein before the record could be released. The first two Zapple records did come out. We just didn't have [Brautigan's record] ready in time before Klein closed it down. None of the Beatles ever heard it." Brautigan's record was eventually released as Listening to Richard Brautigan on Harvest Records, a subsidiary of Apple distributor EMI, in the US only.

The first recordings were made for Zapple in January 1969, as field recordings of poets in their homes by Miles on a portable tape recorder as he toured the east coast of America. This included poet and Fugs drummer Ken Weaver and Black Mountain poet Charles Olson. According to Miles, a spoken word album by Lawrence Ferlinghetti, which had been recorded and edited, would have been Zapple 4, and a spoken word album by Michael McClure had also been recorded. A planned Zapple release of a UK appearance by comedian Lenny Bruce was never completed. An early 1969 press release also named Pablo Casals as an expected guest on the label. American author Ken Kesey was given a tape recorder to record his impressions of London, but they were never released. Miles also had the intention of bringing world leaders to the label. Zapple was shut down in June 1969 by Klein, apparently with the backing of Lennon.

== Artists ==
- Badfinger (originally known as the Iveys) – Signed to Apple after several demo tapes were brought in by Beatles' road manager Mal Evans, after getting approval from Paul McCartney, George Harrison and John Lennon. They had several top 10 hits in the UK and US, including the McCartney song "Come and Get It", and recorded five albums for Apple.
- Black Dyke Mills Band (as John Foster & Sons Ltd. Black Dyke Mills Band) – A north of England brass band whom Paul McCartney employed for the one-off "Thingummybob"/"Yellow Submarine" single. It was recorded by McCartney on location near Bradford, where the group were based.
- Brute Force (stage name of Stephen Friedland) – Harrison attempted to have his song "King of Fuh" released as an Apple single. EMI refused to handle it, owing to its intentionally vulgar double entendre ("Fuh king"), but Apple manufactured a small number of copies in-house which were made available to the public. The song itself appears on the 2010 compilation Come and Get It: The Best of Apple Records.
- Elastic Oz Band – A one-off single, "God Save Us", was written and produced by Lennon and Yoko Ono to raise money for a legal battle involving Oz magazine. The A-side of the single was sung by Bill Elliot, later a member of Harrison's Dark Horse Records signing Splinter.
- Elephant's Memory – Recruited as backing band for Lennon and Ono, and also released material separately, including contributions to the soundtrack of the 1969 film Midnight Cowboy (not on Apple).
- Chris Hodge – Discovered by Ringo Starr; they shared an interest in UFOs. Hodge only released two singles on Apple, the second of them not issued in the UK.
- Mary Hopkin – Discovered after appearing on a UK television talent show and suggested by the model Twiggy. Her early recordings were produced by McCartney, including the Lennon-McCartney original "Goodbye" and her hit recording of "Those Were the Days". She also released a Eurovision Song Contest entry on Apple ("Knock, Knock Who's There?") and two studio albums.
- Hot Chocolate (as Hot Chocolate Band) – Released one single, a reggae version of "Give Peace A Chance", which they recorded and had played to Lennon, who liked it. Their post-Apple releases as Hot Chocolate were more commercially successful.
- Jackie Lomax – Liverpudlian singer known to the Beatles through his Brian Epstein connections; he recorded the Harrison-produced album Is This What You Want?, released in 1969, which also includes musical contributions from Starr and McCartney. Lomax's first single, "Sour Milk Sea", features those three Beatles and was written by Harrison.
- Modern Jazz Quartet – Associated with Ono, and were famous prior to their involvement with Apple. They released two albums for the label, Under the Jasmin Tree and Space.
- Yoko Ono – Recorded extensively with Lennon and released several singles and albums herself; on these Lennon usually directed the band and also performed.
- David Peel and the Lower East Side – A political folk singer brought to the label by Lennon.
- Billy Preston – Brought in to work with the Beatles in January 1969 on their "Get Back"/"Let It Be" sessions, and signed as a solo artist. Harrison produced Preston's recordings, including the 1969 hit single "That's The Way God Planned It". Preston's recording of Harrison's "My Sweet Lord" was released on Apple before Harrison's version. Preston issued two albums on Apple, That's the Way God Planned It in 1969 with George Harrison, Eric Clapton and Keith Richards, and its follow up Encouraging Words in 1970 with George Harrison, Eric Clapton, Ringo Starr and Delaney Bramlett.
- Radha Krishna Temple (London), the UK branch of the Hare Krishna movement. Harrison brought the Temple devotees to the label in 1969 and produced two hit singles by them in 1969–70, including "Hare Krishna Mantra", as well as their eponymous studio album, released in 1971.
- Ravi Shankar – An Indian classical musician. Harrison brought Shankar to the label in 1971 and produced his Apple releases, which included the Raga soundtrack and In Concert 1972, a double live album with Ali Akbar Khan.
- Ronnie Spector – Married to Phil Spector, who separately worked with the Beatles and solo Beatles from 1970 onwards. Harrison wrote, co-produced and played on her only Apple single, "Try Some, Buy Some", which was made with her husband, as an attempt to revive her recording career.
- The Sundown Playboys – A French-language cajun band from Louisiana. A pre-existing single was brought to the label by Starr.
- John Tavener – A classical composer. His brother, a builder, worked on Starr's house, and the drummer took an interest in Tavener.
- James Taylor – Recorded with McCartney, who appears on the Apple LP that launched his career.
- Trash (originally White Trash) – Brought to Apple by Tony Meehan, formerly of the Shadows. Their second single was a cover of "Golden Slumbers" and charted on Apple in the UK.
- Doris Troy – An American soul artist since the early 1960s, who worked with Harrison and Preston while the latter was signed to Apple. Troy recorded one Apple album, and released two spin-off singles in 1970, the first of which, "Ain't That Cute", was co-written with Harrison. Starr also collaborated on the album, and is credited as a co-writer with Harrison and Troy on some of the tracks.
- Lon and Derrek Van Eaton – Signed to the label in September 1971 by Harrison, who produced their debut single, "Sweet Music". Starr also contributed to the recording, and to other tracks on the Van Eatons' 1972 Apple album Brother.

Also released were the soundtracks to Come Together and El Topo (in the US), the onetime Philles Records compilation Phil Spector's Christmas Album and the multi-artist The Concert for Bangla Desh. Cassette and 8-track tape versions of Bangla Desh were marketed by Columbia Records after a deal that permitted the inclusion of Bob Dylan, a Columbia artist, on the album.

Artists who had considerable success in the pop and rock world after their initial sessions at Apple Records include Badfinger (originally known as the Iveys), James Taylor, Mary Hopkin, Hot Chocolate, Yoko Ono and Billy Preston.

Artists who auditioned to appear on the label, but did not make it, include:

- McGough and McGear (the latter of whom was McCartney's brother), whose self-titled album was due to be released on Apple; it was instead released on Parlophone, to which both were signed as members of The Scaffold.
- Grapefruit, whose single "Dear Delilah" was issued on RCA Records with Apple publishing credit.
- Focal Point, a Liverpool band who were going to be managed by Brian Epstein before he died, were signed to Apple after chasing McCartney around Hyde Park. John Lennon signed them to Apple; they were the first band signed. Their single "Sycamore Sid" was issued on Deram Records with credit to Apple Publishing on the label.
- Fire (a band with future Strawbs member Dave Lambert on guitar) released two singles in 1968: "Father's Name Was Dad", produced by Tony Clarke, and "Round the Gum Tree", on Decca with Apple publishing credits.
- Delaney and Bonnie's Accept No Substitute album was originally meant to be released on Apple in 1969; it was first released commercially on Elektra Records the same year. In England, copies of the LP were pressed before Apple realized the band were already contracted to Elektra. No album covers were ever printed; the disc is now a high-value Apple collectible.
- Mortimer were a folk-based three-piece, notable for a recording of the Beatles' "Two of Us". It was planned for release as an Apple single in 1969 (before the Beatles' version was issued) under the title "On Our Way Home", but the release was cancelled.
- Raven were offered a contract to record with Apple after Harrison received a tape from the band's manager Marty Angelo. Harrison was unable to be their producer, but sent Apple A&R chief Peter Asher to New York City to discuss Asher filling the role. This is documented in the book The Longest Cocktail Party and in Angelo's autobiography Once Life Matters: A New Beginning. The band turned down Asher's offer, and instead signed with Columbia Records in 1969.
- Slow Dog (later known as Wheels) were a Cambridge-based rock band fronted by Scottish singer/guitarist Dave Kelly. They were the winners of the Apple Records-sponsored national talent contest early 1969, organised by Asher prior to his departure for the US. The winner of the talent contest was promised a record contract with Apple Records, but owing to Asher's departure, the band only recorded demo tracks. However, on recommendation from Mal Evans, Warner Bros. Records in London signed Slow Dog to a record contract, officially changing their name to Wheels.
- See also Zapple Records section for cancelled releases.

== See also ==
- Apple Corps v Apple Computer
- List of record labels
- The Longest Cocktail Party, an inside account of Apple Corps by Richard DiLello
