= White Trash (Scottish band) =

Pop band signed to The Beatles' Apple Records

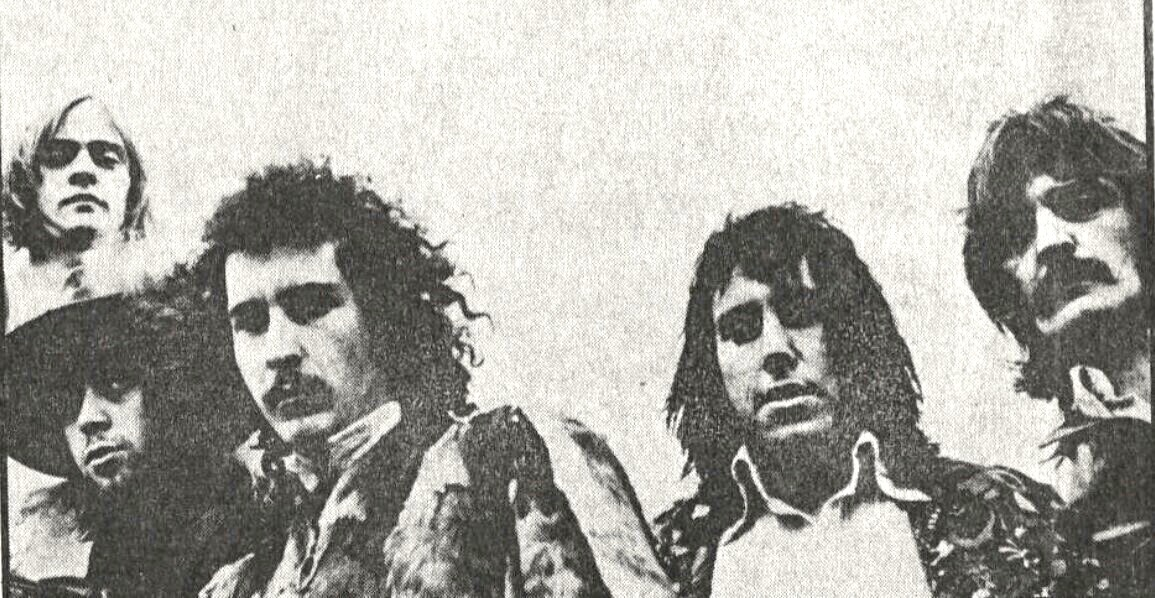

Background information
- Also known as: Trash
- Origin: Scotland
- Years active: Late 1960s
- Label: Apple Records
- Spinoff of: The Pathfinders; The Poets
- Members: Timi Donald; Neil McCormick; Ronnie Leahy; Colin Morrison; Ian Clews; Frazer Watson

White Trash were a Scottish pop group who recorded briefly for Apple Records in 1969.

Made up of ex-members of the Pathfinders and the Poets, they were given the name White Trash by Richard DiLello, the Apple liaison officer who wrote a book about his times at the label called The Longest Cocktail Party. DiLello also penned most of the biographies for the label's artists. The name White Trash was also in use in the United States by Edgar and Johnny Winter but being deemed offensive in Britain, the British White Trash changed their name to the one word, Trash, on their last Apple single.

The band issued only four tracks on two singles on Apple; both A-sides were covers: Gerry Goffin and Carole King's "Road to Nowhere", and Paul McCartney's "Golden Slumbers / Carry That Weight"; although Trash's version was released a week before the Beatles' version on their forthcoming album Abbey Road. The single "Golden Slumbers / Carry That Weight" made the top 40, but the band disappeared shortly after. The single was included on the multi-artist compilation Come and Get It: The Best of Apple Records in 2010.

== Discography ==
- "Road to Nowhere" (as White Trash) (1969), Apple
- "Golden Slumbers/Carry That Weight" (as Trash) (1969), Apple – UK No. 35
