= Chris Hodge =

Chris Hodge is an English rock singer-songwriter. He signed with Apple Records and released a UFO-themed single, "We're On Our Way"/"Supersoul" in June 1972. This single did not chart in the UK Singles Chart, but in the US it reached No. 44 on the Billboard Hot 100, number 25 in Canada, number 26 in the Netherlands and number 82 in Australia. His follow-up single, "Goodbye Sweet Lorraine"/"Contact Love" (January 1973) was not released in the UK, and was not a hit in the US.

He then recorded two singles for RCA Records: "My Linda"/"Get Your Rocks Off Baby" (September 1973) and "Beautiful Love"/"Sweet Lady From The Sky" (March 1974), and a further single, which was released on DJM: "I Love You"/"Old James Dean" (November 1974).
