= Lon & Derrek Van Eaton =

American vocal and multi-instrumental duo

Lon & Derrek Van Eaton were an American vocal and multi-instrumentalist duo from Trenton, New Jersey, consisting of brothers Lon and Derrek Van Eaton. They are best known for their association with the Beatles through the brothers' brief stint on Apple Records, and for their subsequent session work in Los Angeles for producer Richard Perry. As well as recording their own albums, during the 1970s they appeared on releases by artists including George Harrison, Ringo Starr, Harry Nilsson, Carly Simon, Martha Reeves and Art Garfunkel. Beatles biographer Robert Rodriguez describes the Van Eaton brothers as arguably the closest the Apple record label came to delivering on its initial promise of "plucking unknowns from obscurity" and launching them as successful recording artists.

After being out of print for close to 40 years, their sole Apple album, Brother, containing the Harrison-produced single "Sweet Music", was reissued on RPM Records in June 2012.

== Background ==
Lon and Derrek Van Eaton began their professional musical career during the mid 1960s, as teenagers, in a popular Trenton band known as the Trees. With Trees drummer Tim Case, they soon morphed into a new group, Jacobs Creek, which also included Steve Burgh, subsequently a sought-after session musician and producer. The band signed to Columbia Records and released an eponymous studio album in 1969. Lead vocals were shared between Derrek, Bruce Foster and Lon; the latter also wrote all the songs and played guitar, saxophone, sitar and harpsichord on the album. Jacobs Creek failed to make an impact outside the New York area and disbanded in March 1971.

After Jacobs Creek, Lon and Derrek Van Eaton concentrated on songwriting and recorded a series of demos on a pair of standard tape machines at home, in their rented house on North Hermitage Avenue, Trenton. Led by younger brother Derrek's vocals, the Van Eatons sang and played all the instruments on the recordings, using various surfaces of the house to replicate drum sounds. Their manager, Robin Garb, then forwarded seven of the songs on to various record company A&R departments, one of which was the New York office of the Beatles' Apple label, run by Allan Steckler. George Harrison listened to the tape and liked what he heard, as did John Lennon. Author Robert Rodriguez writes that, given the spiritual quality of the duo's songs, they had a "natural" compatibility with Harrison.

In June 1971, Apple wrote to Garb to tell him of Harrison's interest in the demos. Two weeks later, the brothers received a phone call from Harrison, inviting them to record for the label; they then met him when he was in New York for the Concert for Bangladesh. Nat Weiss, a New York-based artist's agent, helped negotiate their contract with Apple, which the brothers signed on 15 September. The duo had received more favourable offers from two other record labels, according to Lon, but they opted to commit to Apple due to its more "evolved" ethos. On 19 September, the Van Eatons and Garb flew to London, where they attended the launch party for the refurbished Apple Studio on Savile Row at the end of the month. They became the first artists to record at the new facility, and were one of the final acts signed to Apple Records. When the brothers first arrived in the UK and were driven to Harrison's home, Friar Park, he was waiting for them on his lawn, playing their song "Sweet Music" on his guitar. In connection with the Concert for Bangladesh George Harrison had given one of his Harptone guitars to Lon. It was a black six-string guitar and Lon brought it with him to London to record 'Sweet Music'. George also put Lon and Derrek in contact with the Harptone company in New Jersey. They went to the company and received several Harptone guitars. However, Lon's black Harptone was a present from George.

== "Sweet Music" and the Brother album ==
Harrison was preoccupied with his Bangladesh charity project during the second half of 1971 and through much of 1972, and so entrusted the Van Eatons' development to Klaus Voormann, a longstanding associate of the Beatles. In November 1971, Billboard magazine announced that Voormann would produce the brothers' releases for Apple. Harrison produced their first recording, however – "Sweet Music", which he had earmarked as their debut single.

Working at Abbey Road Studios, Harrison invited a number of famous friends to play on "Sweet Music": Peter Frampton joined the Van Eatons on a third acoustic guitar, and Ringo Starr and Jim Gordon played drums. Aside from Mike Hugg on harmonium, Lon and Derrek played all the other instruments on the track, including electric piano, bass guitar and tenor saxophone. The recording engineer was Phil McDonald, who had worked with the Beatles and then with Harrison on his 1970 solo album All Things Must Pass. The result was reminiscent of Harrison's All Things Must Pass track "Isn't It a Pity". Music journalist Jay Lustig describes "Sweet Music" as "a dreamy, utopian ballad", while Rodriguez calls it "a fine Harrisonian-sounding single".

The brothers then worked at Apple Studios with Voormann on an album, titled Brother, with Starr participating on some songs. Geoff Emerick, who managed the studio, later wrote of the extended sessions for the Van Eatons' album: "their problem was that they couldn't match the feel of the demonstration tape that had gotten them their record deal in the first place. It's actually a common enough occurrence – in recording studio parlance, it's a phenomenon known as 'chasing the demo.'" John Mills subsequently took over from Emerick as recording engineer. Lon recalled in 2010 that the recording process was far more conducive to creating music than when they had made their album with Jacobs Creek in New York, where "Simon and Garfunkel had the studio at will, so sometimes even if we were recording, they could decide they needed to come in and kick us out. We literally had the Apple studios to ourselves."

The single was released in America in advance of the album, on 6 March 1972 (as Apple 1845). The B-side was "Song of Songs", produced by Voormann and recorded at Apple. "Sweet Music" received highly favourable reviews; Record World magazine said it was "a stirring ballad that will make them immediate chart contenders" and added: "Production by George Harrison couldn't be better. Just right for today's market." The single failed to attract airplay or find any commercial success, however. Harrison was flummoxed by this, declaring in a telegram to Apple's marketing staff: "What the !!!!! is the matter out there? 'Sweet Music' is a No. 1 Hit!"

Following the sessions in London, further recording for the album took place at Bell Sound in New York. The musicians on these recordings included Andy Newmark, on drums, and T.J. Tindall, lead guitarist with the Edison Electric Band and another Trenton musician.

Brother was released on 22 September 1972 (delayed until 9 February 1973 in Britain). It contained "Sweet Music" and ten other songs written by the Van Eatons. Typical of the label's ethos of putting the artist first, Apple supplied lavish artwork for the album. The cover photo of the brothers was taken by photographer Clive Arrowsmith. Voormann, an established artist and designer, created a novelty zoetrope insert. When placed on a turntable, the insert created moving images of the brothers, showing them playing guitar and drums.

Brother received favourable reviews but met the same commercial fate as "Sweet Music". Stephen Holden of Rolling Stone wrote: "This staggeringly impressive first album by the Van Eaton brothers ... displays more energy, good feeling, and sheer musical talent than any debut rock record I've heard this year. It's no wonder that Apple signed the brothers to a five-year contract simply on the basis of a homemade tape ..." Holden admired the range and versatility of Derrek's singing and said that, while the album's music was "frankly derivative", it was "of such a high order as to pay one-to-one tribute to its sources rather than simply to parody or rip them off". Reviewing the 2012 Brother reissue, for AllMusic, Richie Unterberger remarks on the similarities of the Van Eatons' sound with that of Badfinger and Paul McCartney, and describes the album as "on the pleasantly innocuous side as a whole".

== Los Angeles and Who Do You Out Do ==
By the start of 1973, Apple Records was being wound down, and Badfinger represented the only act other than the four former Beatles and Yoko Ono, Lennon's wife, who were active on the label. Having recently worked with producer Richard Perry on a Harry Nilsson session in London, Harrison recommended that the brothers relocate to Los Angeles and record with Perry's engineer, Bill Schnee.

The move ensured that the Van Eaton name remained in the spotlight, with both brothers being credited for percussion on Ringo Starr's US number 1 "Photograph". For the next two years, Richard Perry's projects kept the Van Eatons, particularly Lon, working with a number of top recording artists (though distinctly MOR in style compared to Apple's less glitzy roster). This session work included appearances on four more gold-selling albums of the early-to-mid 1970s, all produced by Perry: Andy Williams' Solitaire, Starr's Goodnight Vienna, Carly Simon's Playing Possum and Art Garfunkel's Breakaway. In addition, the brothers assisted Harrison on his Dark Horse album by providing the title track with backing vocals (Harrison's own singing voice having become ravaged by laryngitis, mid-sessions and pre-tour).

Having been released from Apple, Lon and Derrek were offered a chance to record an album for A&M Records. Who Do You Out Do was produced by Perry and Schnee, and contained musical contributions from Gary Wright, Chuck Findley, Jim Keltner, Voormann and Gordon. Voormann and Keltner also supported the brothers on a tour of Japan. The album was released in March 1975 and again failed to chart. Writing in The Rolling Stone Record Guide in 1979, Charley Walters dismissed Who Do You Out Do as "Passable melodic pop, unambitious and un-individual" with "suitably modest" production by Perry and Schnee. Lon later recalled their period with A&M as "tough", saying that "Richard and Bill both ended up producing but the 'feel' was with Bill and the 'biz' was Richard. We couldn't choose one or the other so we compromised. Big mistake."

Having developed considerably as a lead guitarist, Lon played on albums by Starr (Ringo's Rotogravure, Ringo the 4th and Bad Boy) and Harry Nilsson (…That's the Way It Is, Knnillssonn). He also appeared as a member of Starr's band "Ringo's Roadside Attraction" in his TV special Ringo, which aired in April 1978.

== 1980s and beyond ==
With diminishing opportunities for session work, Lon followed his younger brother and left Los Angeles. By 1985 he had established himself in Denver, Colorado, where he set up a not-for-profit musical and film production company, Imagine a Better World. Derrek withdrew from his role as a professional musician. In a 2010 interview, Lon described Imagine a Better World as "a company dedicated to creating conscious change through media" and credited the Beatles' humanitarian message as an inspiration for the concept.

In the summer of 1996, the Van Eatons reunited to record a contribution for the various artists compilation Come and Get It: A Tribute to Badfinger. The brothers chose "Apple of My Eye", a song written by Pete Ham about his sadness at Badfinger's departure from Apple Records in 1973. Jack Rabid of AllMusic has written of that album: "a more loving tribute ... would be hard to imagine. All 22 artists exhibit the sort of reverence Badfinger once had for the Beatles!" This session led to further collaborations between the brothers, resulting in their third album, Black & White. The album was released privately on 9 May 1998 and featured Voormann and Starr, as well as former Wings drummer Denny Seiwell.

In 2005, Lon Van Eaton played on Les Fradkin's cover of "My Sweet Lord", recorded as a tribute to the late George Harrison. In October 2010, Lon & Derrek Van Eaton's "Sweet Music" was included on the Apple compilation Come and Get It: The Best of Apple Records. Having been omitted from the Apple reissue campaign that produced that 2010 compilation, the Brother album was finally reissued on 25 June 2012, on the RPM label. Among its nine bonus tracks are the B-side "Song of Songs", various demos and session outtakes, and a remix of "Sweet Music".

In 2013, Lon and Derrek released Anthology 1968–2012 on their Imagine a Better World label. It features 20 unreleased tracks and contributions from Starr, Keltner, Voormann and Wright.

== Discography ==
=== Albums ===
==== Brother ====
22 September 1972 (US) (Apple SMAS 3390)
9 February 1973 (UK) (Apple SAPCOR 25)
produced by Klaus Voormann; except track 6, produced by George Harrison

Track Listing:

1. "Warm Woman" – 3:01
2. "Sun Song" – 3:57
3. "More Than Words" – 2:16
4. "Hear My Cry" – 3:00
5. "Without the Lord" – 1:37
6. "Sweet Music" – 3:41
7. "Help Us All" – 2:53
8. "Maybe There's Another" – 2:42
9. "Ring" – 2:24
10. "Sunshine" – 3:48
11. "Another Thought" – 3:41

Personnel:

- Lon Van Eaton – vocals, piano, electric and acoustic guitars, saxophone, drums, horn and string arrangements
- Derrek Van Eaton – lead vocals, bass, flute, acoustic guitar, drums
- T.J. Tindall – electric guitar (4, 9, 11)
- Andy Newmark – drums (4, 7, 9)
- Ringo Starr – drums (6, 11)
- Alexis Guevara – congas (4, 9)
- Peter Frampton – acoustic guitar (6)
- Jim Gordon – drums (6)
- Mike Hugg – harmonium (6)
- Richard Davis – standup bass (7)
- Klaus Voormann – bass (11)

==== Who Do You Out Do ====
7 March 1975 (US) (A&M SP 4507)
produced by Richard Perry; except tracks 1–4, produced by Richard Perry & Bill Schnee

Track Listing:

1. "Who Do You Out Do" – 3:18
2. "You Lose" – 2:25
3. "Do You Remember" – 3:41
4. "Music Lover" – 3:12
5. "Let It Grow" – 2:56
6. "Wildfire" – 3:38
7. "Dancing in the Dark" – 2:38
8. "All You're Hungry for is Love" – 2:51
9. "Baby It's You" – 3:38
10. "The Harder You Pull ... The Tighter It Gets" – 3:52

Personnel:

- Lon Van Eaton – vocals, piano, electric and acoustic guitars, Moog synthesizer, clarinets, percussion, backing vocals
- Derrek Van Eaton – lead vocals, bass, flute, acoustic guitar, percussion, backing vocals
- Klaus Voormann – bass
- Jim Keltner – drums
- Jim Gordon – drums
- Gary Wright – piano
- Tom Seufert – electric and acoustic guitars
- Trevor Lawrence – saxophones
- Chuck Findley – trumpet, trombone
- Russ Turner – organ
- David Beebe – drums
- Richard Perry – percussion
- Lynda Lawrence & friends – backing vocals

=== Singles ===
- "Sweet Music" / "Song of Songs" (US: Apple 1845, released 6 March 1972)
- "Warm Woman" / "More Than Words" (UK: Apple 46; released 9 March 1973)

== Sources ==
- Keith Badman, The Beatles Diary Volume 2: After the Break-Up 1970–2001, Omnibus Press (London, 2001; ISBN 0-7119-8307-0).
- Harry Castleman & Walter J. Podrazik, All Together Now: The First Complete Beatles Discography 1961–1975, Ballantine Books (New York, NY, 1976; ISBN 0-345-25680-8).
- Peter Doggett, You Never Give Me Your Money: The Beatles After the Breakup, It Books (New York, NY, 2011; ISBN 978-0-06-177418-8).
- Geoff Emerick, Here, There & Everywhere: My Life Recording the Music of the Beatles, Gotham (New York, NY, 2006; ISBN 978-1-59240-269-4).
- Simon Leng, While My Guitar Gently Weeps: The Music of George Harrison, Hal Leonard (Milwaukee, WI, 2006; ISBN 1-4234-0609-5).
- Dave Marsh & John Swenson (eds), The New Rolling Stone Record Guide, Random House/Rolling Stone Press (New York, NY, 1983; ISBN 0-394-72107-1).
- Robert Rodriguez, Fab Four FAQ 2.0: The Beatles' Solo Years, 1970–1980, Backbeat Books (Milwaukee, WI, 2010; ISBN 978-1-4165-9093-4).
- Robert Rodriguez, Solo in the 70s: John, Paul, George, Ringo: 1970–1980, Parading Press (Downers Grove, IL, 2013; ISBN 978-0-9892555-0-9).
- Stan Soocher, Baby You're a Rich Man: Suing the Beatles for Fun and Profit, University Press of New England (Lebanon, NH, 2015; ISBN 978-1-61168-380-6).
- Bruce Spizer, The Beatles Solo on Apple Records, 498 Productions (New Orleans, LA, 2005; ISBN 0-9662649-5-9).
