= Brute Force (musician) =

- Birth name: Stephen Friedland
- Also known as: Brute Force
- Born: September 29, 1940 (age 84); Jersey City, New Jersey, U.S.
- Genres: Pop, rock, comedy rock
- Occupation(s): Singer songwriter, actor
- Instrument: Piano
- Years active: 1963–present
- Labels: Columbia, Atlantic, BT Puppy, Bar None, Apple
- Website: brutesforce.com

Stephen Friedland (born September 29, 1940), known as Brute Force, is an American singer and songwriter. He wrote and performed with The Tokens in the 1960s and wrote songs for Peggy March, Del Shannon, The Chiffons and The Cyrkle, and others.

== Early life and influences ==
Stephen Friedland was born in Jersey City, New Jersey. He was first attracted to performing when he was only eight years old, influenced by his mother, who was an actress in several plays at the Jersey City Jewish Community Center Theater.

Raised in Deal, New Jersey, Friedland attended Asbury Park High School, from which he graduated in 1957 and graduated from Monmouth University in 1963.

In the early 1960s he met Billy Gussak and began working together with the veteran studio drummer. One song he worked on with Gussak, "My Teenage Castle" ended up on the B-side of the 1963 Peggy March single, "I Wish I Were a Princess." After achieving success at RCA he began to play guitar and keyboards for the Tokens. During that time he wrote songs for Del Shannon, the Creation, the Cyrkle, and the Chiffons. The Chiffons had a minor hit with "Nobody Knows What's Goin' on in My Mind But Me." In 1967 he left the Tokens and entered the next phase of his musical career.

== Music career ==
He wrote and recorded the LP I, Brute Force – Confections of Love for Columbia Records in 1967. One song on the album, "No Olympian Height", was covered by Paul Levinson's trio The Other Voices (produced by Ellie Greenwich and Mike Rashkow) and released on Atlantic Records in 1968. He also recorded and released the album Extemporaneous on BT Puppy Records in 1970. Original copies of this album are scarce and it is now a very collectible disc.

In July 1968 he and a friend, Ben Schlossberg Jr., participated in an expedition to swim from Cape Prince of Wales, Alaska to Siberia, 50 miles (80 km) across the Bering Strait. They made it halfway, stopping between Big Diomede and Little Diomede Islands.

In 2010, Bar None Records reissued and released Brute Force's first solo album I, Brute Force – Confections of Love with bonus tracks not contained on the original 1967 vinyl edition. Brute Force's single "The King of Fuh" was also included among songs by James Taylor, Badfinger, Mary Hopkin and others on Come and Get It: The Best of Apple Records, released in October 2010.

Razor Films/Andrew Fuller producer has been in production of a documentary BRUTE FORCE about Friedland since 2010 (Ben Steinbauer, dir., Winnebago Man) with various screenings in the US and Europe.

=== "The King of Fuh" ===
Brute Force may be best known for a song that barely saw a release. Written by Friedland and produced by The Tokens, "The King of Fuh" is a story about a monarch in the land of Fuh referred repeatedly to as the "Fuh King". John Lennon admired the record; so did George Harrison, who acquired the track and overdubbed eleven strings of the London Philharmonic Orchestra, arranged by John Barham. It soon became obvious that neither EMI nor Capitol Records would distribute the single, so Apple Records pressed and distributed 1,000 copies (catalog number Apple 08) in 1969. After the initial Apple pressing (and no radio play), Friedland teamed up with Jeff Cheen and issued the tune on his own Brute Force Records label (b/w "Tapeworm Of Love", which later received airplay on the Dr. Demento radio show). In 2005, the Revola label issued both "King of Fuh" and its original B side ("Nobody Knows") as bonus tracks on the CD reissue of the BT Puppy Records compilation Extemporaneous.

Finally, in 2010 (over four decades after Capitol and EMI rejected it), "The King of Fuh" was again released by Apple, on the compilation Come and Get It: The Best of Apple Records.

In 2019 a copy of the 45 rpm record on the Apple label was sold at Sotheby's for £2,250.

== Later years ==
After leaving show business for a period of time and working as a paralegal, Friedland began performing in many comedy venues, and acted in the film Ghostbusters, appeared at a Beatlesfest in New Jersey, performing "King Of Fuh", and subsequently was interviewed by Brett Alan on a Beatles radio show on WNNJ radio, also in New Jersey.

Brute Force traveled to Los Angeles in 2001 to play the Scramarama festival at the historic Palace Theater downtown, and toured England in 2004 with Misty's Big Adventure, playing in Liverpool, Birmingham, London and Nottingham, plus a personal performance of a unique song to thoroughbred mare "Premier Bid" upon the occasion of her thirtieth birthday in Goole Fields. In honor of Brute Force, the horse's owners named a foal "Special Bru" after the singer in late 2004. He performed with his daughter Lilah, known as Daughter of Force, in the Truck Music Festival, UK.

In June 2006, The King of Fuh, a musical comedy, written by Friedland, was produced at the Players Club, New York City, with Brute Force himself as the King.

Brute Force continues to perform at venues in the twenty-first century. In 2015 he appeared briefly in the film Birdman, and plays The Director in the English version of the Enrique Iglesias/Nicky Jam music video, Forgiveness.

In September 2015, Friedland returned to Jersey City for a screening of the Brute Force documentary at the Golden Door Film Festival, followed by a performance by Brute Force and Daughter Of Force at Brightside Tavern.
