= The Sundown Playboys =

Sundown Playboys
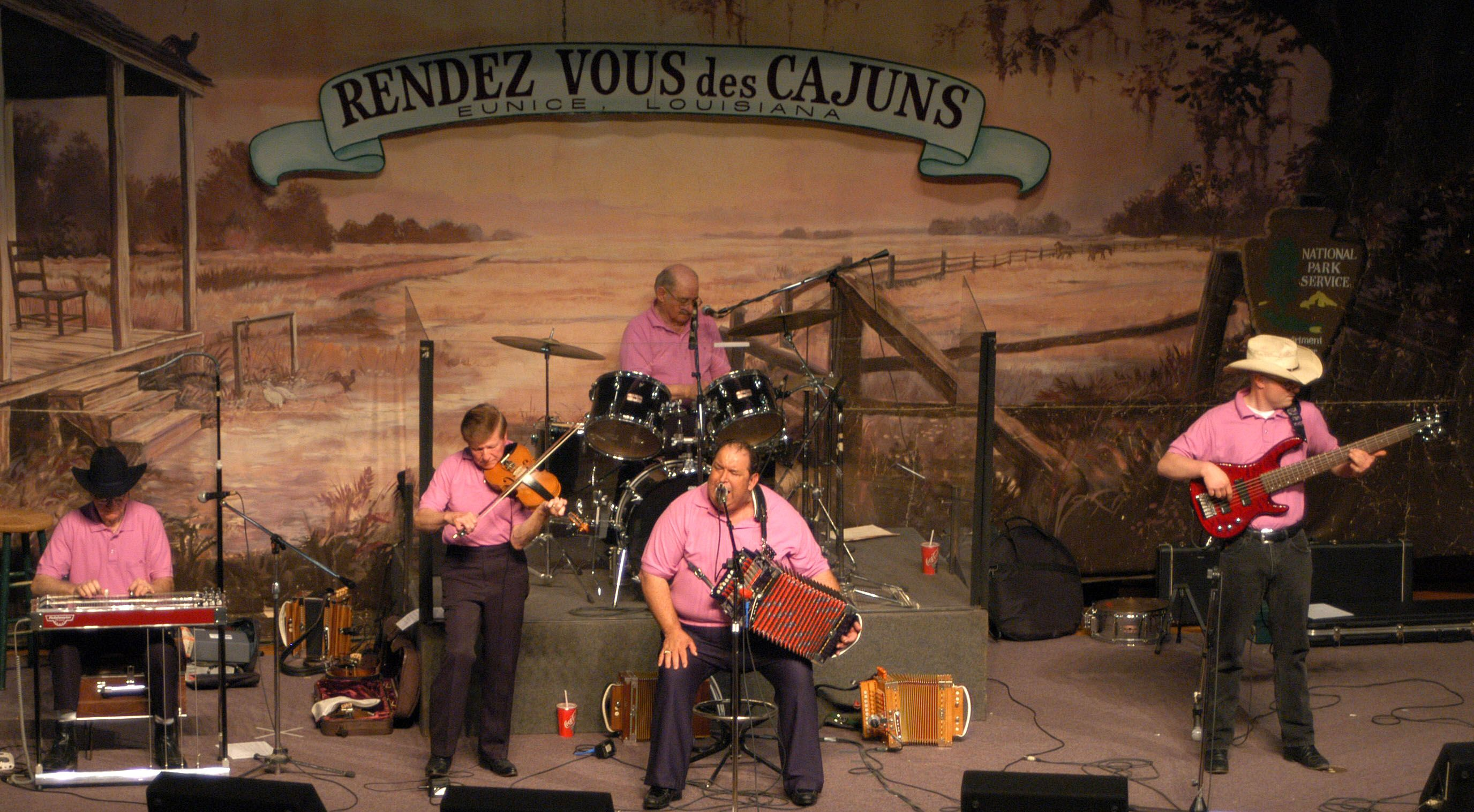
- Lesa Cormier and the Sundown Playboys at the Liberty Theater in 2003.

Background information
- Origin: Louisiana, U.S.
- Genres: Cajun
- Years active: 1945–present

The Sundown Playboys are an American Cajun music band in Louisiana, United States.

The band was founded in 1945 by accordionist Lionel Cormier, and has been performing almost continuously throughout the United States. After the death of Lionel Cormier in the early 1970s, Lesa Cormier decided to carry on the tradition of his father's band.

Over the years, several accordion players have played in Lionel Cormier's place, but three core members of the group have continued playing. Lesa Cormier has played drums since the beginning with his father. He was seventeen when he started. Wallace "Red" Touchet plays the fiddle and Larry Miller plays the steel guitar. After leading a band of his own, accordionist August Broussard joined the band in 2000. In the 1980s, Lesa's son, Danny, joined the band as a bass player and sometimes steel guitar, but now plays steel guitar with Jackie Caillier and the Cajun Cousins. Danny's son joined the band as bass player. Brian Cormier is the fourth generation of the Cormier family to be a member of the Sundown Playboys.
