= Meanwhile, back at the ranch (disambiguation) =

Meanwhile, back at the ranch is a common catchphrase.

Meanwhile, back at the ranch can also refer to:

- "Meanwhile Back at the Ranch"/"Should I Smoke", a 1974 song by Badfinger
- "Meanwhile Back at the Ranch", a 2000 song by The Clark Family Experience
- Meanwhile, Back at the Ranch (album), a 2005 album by Texas Lightning
