= Lost Inside Your Love =

Single by Badfinger

from the album Airwaves
- B-side: "Come Down Hard"
- Released: 4 May 1979
- Genre: Power pop
- Length: 2:42
- Label: Radio/Elektra
- Songwriter: Tom Evans
- Producer: David Malloy

Badfinger singles chronology
"I Miss You" (1974)	"Lost Inside Your Love" (1979)	"Love Is Gonna Come at Last" (1979)

"Lost Inside Your Love" is a song by the Welsh rock band Badfinger. Written by bassist Tom Evans, "Lost Inside Your Love" was the third track on the band's 1979 album, Airwaves.

== Release ==
"Lost Inside Your Love" appeared on the album Airwaves, which was Badfinger's first album since Wish You Were Here from 1974. The album flopped, only hitting #125 in the US. "Lost Inside Your Love" was selected to be the album's first UK single release. Backed with the Joey Molland-written track "Come Down Hard", the song, like the album, was not successful, and failed to chart. "Love Is Gonna Come at Last" was released as second single in July 1979, which was the lead single from the album in the US.

Cash Box described it as a "lilting pop number" with "lush, full vocals and easily building harmonies" and "a catchy guitar phrase." Record World called it a "mid-tempo ballad that features progressive rock melodies and lovely harmonies."

Classic Rock History critic Janey Roberts rated it as Badfinger's ninth best song.

"Lost Inside Your Love" appeared on the 1989 compilation album, The Best of Badfinger, Vol. 2.
