= Rock of All Ages =

1969 Badfinger song

Single by Badfinger

from the album Magic Christian Music
- A-side: "Come and Get It"
- Released: 5 December 1969
- Recorded: 18 September 1969
- Studio: IBC Studios, London
- Length: 3:16
- Label: Apple
- Songwriters: Tom Evans; Pete Ham; Mike Gibbins
- Producer: Paul McCartney

"Rock of All Ages" is a song written by Tom Evans, Pete Ham and Mike Gibbons that was first released on Badfinger's 1970 album Magic Christian Music. It was also released as the b-side to Badfinger's hit single "Come and Get It". The song was originally used as part of the soundtrack for the 1969 film The Magic Christian, starring Peter Sellers and Ringo Starr. The song was produced by Paul McCartney.

== Writing and recording ==
Evans told how the song originated:

There's a disco scene in The Magic Christian film where they had "Respect" by Aretha Franklin playing and we had to cover that with our song. We really didn't know what to do, do a "soul" thing or whatever. Well the time came for the recording and we didn't have a song together. McCartney comes in and says "Well, what've you got?" And we said "We don't really know." So he said "Well, what do you know that's really exciting?" I said "Well, we can do 'Long Tall Sally' in G". And he goes "G, okay!"

So we started to make up a song similar to "Long Tall Sally" in G. We just did the backing track. When it came time to do the vocal I was just floundering over it. He started to sing with me and we both kind of made it up. There's a great take of me and him singing it together. I said "You've got to use that on the record, please use that on the record." He said, "No, you go down and do it properly."

Badfinger manager Bill Collins told a similar story:

To do "Rock of All Ages [McCartney] one day asked me what the boys do when they rave it up. I said "They're pretty good at "Long Tall Sally" so when he met us in the studio, he looked at young Tommy and said "I hear you're a bit of a raver on "Sally"; let's try that. Without ever making any demands on anybody, he just sat down at the piano, started into a bit of a 12-bar, and pulled the boys into it. Once they got rolling, he stood up and said "I've got to do some shopping for my missus; knock out some lyrics while I'm gone." They did, and actually, we finished the whole backing track in less than an hour.

== Music and lyrics ==
In addition to taking the lead vocal, Evans, who had been Badfinger's rhythm guitarist, had to play bass guitar because of the absence of Ron Griffiths, who had been the band's bassist. Evans felt insecure about it, saying "I was playing the bass, but not very well. And Paul said 'Just play the one note we're gonna need, be simple." McCartney played piano on the final recording and Ham played guitar.

Badfinger biographer Robert Day-Webb compared Evans' vocal performance to those of McCartney on such Beatle songs as "Long Tall Sally", "I'm Down" and Helter Skelter". Webb also says that McCartney "does his best Jerry Lee Lewis impression" on the piano.

The lyrics contain a line that proved sadly prophetic in light of the band's subsequent money problems relating to their management contract with Stan Polley: "You're taking all my money and I guess you think it's funny, but I don't."

== Reception ==
Badfinger biographer Dan Matovina called "Rock of All Ages" a "superb rocker" and a "winner", saying that "its snazzy blocks of rhythm pour over Tom's doubled wailing vocals." Matovina also praised McCartney's keyboards. Badfinger biographer Robert Day-Webb also called "Rock of All Ages" a "superb rocker", as well as a "breathlessly exciting rock song" and a "real gem", describing it as "a rollicking, good-time rock number featuring an absolutely throat-shredding performance from Tom." Rolling Stone critic John Mendelsohn felt that it sounded like an adaptation of the Beatles' song "I Saw Her Standing There". Roger Kaye of the Fort Worth Star-Telegram described it as an "early FM rock radio staple."

"Rock of All Ages" has been included on several Badfinger compilation albums, including Come and Get It: The Best of Badfinger in 1995 and The Very Best of Badfinger in 2000.
