= Love Time =

Love Time may refer to:

- Love Time (film), a 1934 American film
- "Love Time" (song), a song by Badfinger on their 1974 album Wish You Were Here
