= Love Is Easy =

Love Is Easy may refer to:

- "Love Is Easy" (Badfinger song), 1974
- "Love Is Easy" (McFly song), 2012
