= Young Savage Florida =

Compilation album by Various Artists
- Released: 1996
- Genre: Alternative rock, indie rock, garage rock, psychobilly, surf punk, queercore
- Label: Baskervinyl/Aquatic Dogg Findings/Blue Heart Records/Speed-O-Meter Records

Young Savage Florida is a compilation CD of various alternative musicians created in 1996. As the title implies, each band or musician was somehow connected to the U.S. State of Florida. The most notable of which was former Badfinger drummer Mike Gibbins who spent the last years of his life in the state.

Spurred by the Baskervils off their own self-published Baskervinyl Records, as well as three other labels, each musician has two songs arranged in the same order, with exceptions of The Vodkats, Galea Escargot (billed simply as "Escargot"), and John Stephan. Liner notes include both real and fake biographies of each band.

Common themes on each track are primarily relevant to southern U.S. culture, including surfing, warm weather, highway travel, and early rock and roll. Two of the more interesting songs are a trashy cover of Neil Sedaka's song "Stupid Cupid," by The Vodkats (in an unintentional medley with the band's own "Kill the Keg"), and a song by Loco Siempre alleging that Jerry Lee Lewis secretly killed Elvis Presley during a drunken rampage.

== Track listings ==
1. Baskervils – "Inspired"
2. The Hate Bombs – "Run and Hide"
3. Leonard Croon Band – "Gonna Run My Mopar All Over You"
4. Car Bomb Driver – "Electric Sheila"
5. The Surf Kings – "Walking Bristol Bridge"
6. The Lears – "Is This Her Day?"
7. Mike Gibbins – "Dream Harder (Ballad of the Red Coats)"
8. Rancid Polecats – "Peterbilt"
9. Edison Shine – "Modulator"
10. Vodkats – "Stupid Cupid / Kill the Keg"
11. Loco Siempre – "Hunk-a-Nookie"
12. Baskervils – "Mr. Wilson's Got the Bends Again"
13. The Hate Bombs – "1" Punch"
14. Leonard Croon Band – "Queen City"
15. Car Bomb Driver – "Chicks Don't Dig Me"
16. The Surf Kings – "Phantom of the Jetties"
17. The Lears – "Her Magic Smile"
18. Mike Gibbins – "Layaway"
19. Rancid Polecats – "BBBB...."
20. Edison Shine – "Suburban Compound"
21. Loco Siempre – "Tell the King The Killer's Here"
22. Escargot – "Shopping Mall Queen"
23. John Stephan – "Coffee Angel"

== Reception ==
Eydie Cubarrubia, of The Bradenton Herald, thought that for the bands she was familiar with, the contents of the record constituted probably their strongest material, and it proved the diversity of the Florida music scene.
