= Badfinger (album) =

Studio album by Badfinger
- Released: 11 February 1974
- Recorded: 21 June – 21 November 1973
- Studio: Olympic and AIR, London
- Genre: Power pop
- Length: 40:05
- Label: Warner Bros.
- Producer: Chris Thomas

Badfinger chronology
Ass (1973)	Badfinger (1974)	Wish You Were Here (1974)

Singles from Badfinger
- 1. "Love Is Easy" Released: October 1973; 2. "I Miss You" Released: March 1974

Professional ratings
Review scores
Source	Rating
AllMusic	3/5 stars
Encyclopedia of Popular Music	3/5 stars

Badfinger is the sixth studio album by the Welsh rock band Badfinger. The album was recorded in autumn 1973 and released in 1974 on Warner Bros. Records. It was the first of two albums released by the band on the Warner label.

== Background ==
As Badfinger were completing work on their last album for Apple Records, Ass, the band's manager, Stan Polley, signed them to a three-year, six-album deal with Warner Bros. Records. As a result, shortly after the band and producer Chris Thomas completed recording of Ass, they found themselves back in the studio making a new album for Warner.

== Release and reception ==
Originally planned for release on 28 December 1973, the album was delayed due to Ass being issued that month. The intended title, For Love or Money, was rejected by the label at the time of production.

On release, Badfinger received an unfavourable review in Rolling Stone magazine. A British single released after the album, "Love Is Easy", failed to chart. A subsequent single issued in the US, "I Miss You", also failed.

Classic Rock critic Rob Hughes rated "Lonely You" as Badfinger's 9th best song, saying it has "wistful piano, sensitive guitar shading and Pete Ham at his plangent best" but complaining that "inexplicably, it was overlooked as a single in favour of the inferior 'Love Is Easy' and 'I Miss You.'"

In the United States, the album peaked at number 161 on Billboard's Top 200 LPs & Tape listings, making it Badfinger's lowest-charting album there. Part of the reason for the poor commercial performance was that, due to litigation with Apple, this album and Ass came out within months of each other; in fact, in the UK, Badfinger actually preceded Ass.

The album was re-released on CD format in the 1990s in Japan and Germany only. The album was eventually issued on CD in the United States in 2007. Many tracks from this album have subsequently been released on various Badfinger compilation records and CDs.

Real Gone Music released an "Expanded" version of the album 30 November 2018. A further expanded edition comprising 40 tracks including those from Wish You Were Here was released 3 January 2020 with the title Shine On 1974.

The album cover was designed by John Kosh.

== Track listing ==
Side one

1. "I Miss You" (Pete Ham) – 2:36
2. "Shine On" (Ham, Tom Evans) – 2:52
3. "Love Is Easy" (Joey Molland) – 3:08
4. "Song for a Lost Friend" (Ham) – 2:52
5. "Why Don't We Talk?" (Evans) – 3:45
6. "Island" (Molland) – 3:40

Side two

1. "Matted Spam" (Ham) – 3:09
2. "Where Do We Go from Here?" (Evans) – 3:25
3. "My Heart Goes Out" (Mike Gibbins) – 3:16
4. "Lonely You" (Ham) – 3:48
5. "Give It Up" (Molland) – 4:34
6. "Andy Norris" (Joey and Kathie Molland) – 2:59

=== 2018 "Expanded" Real Gone Music version ===
1. "I Miss You"
2. "Shine On"
3. "Love Is Easy"
4. "Song for a Lost Friend"
5. "Why Don't We Talk?"
6. "Island"
7. "Matted Spam"
8. "Where Do We Go from Here?"
9. "My Heart Goes Out"
10. "Lonely You"
11. "Give It Up"
12. "Andy Norris"
13. "Love My Lady" (Evans) (unreleased song outtake)
14. "Shine On" (work in progress mix)
15. "Song for a Lost Friend" (work in progress mix)
16. "Island" (work in progress mix)
17. "Matted Spam" (work in progress mix)
18. "Where Do We Go from Here?" (work in progress mix)
19. "My Heart Goes Out" (work in progress mix)
20. "Lonely You" (work in progress mix)
21. "Give It Up" (work in progress mix)
22. "Andy Norris" (work in progress mix)

== Personnel ==
- Pete Ham – guitar, piano, vocals
- Tom Evans – bass, vocals
- Joey Molland – guitar, vocals
- Mike Gibbins – drums, vocals

== Charts ==
Chart (1974)	Peak position
US Billboard 200	161
