= Because I Love You (Badfinger song) =

Single by Badfinger

from the album Say No More
- B-side: "Too Hung Up on You"
- Released: 13 July 1981
- Genre: Power pop
- Length: 2:49
- Label: Radio/Atlantic
- Songwriter: Joey Molland
- Producers: Jack Richardson, Steve Wittmack

Badfinger singles chronology
| "I Got You" (1979) | "Because I Love You" (1981) |

"Because I Love You" is a song by the Welsh rock band Badfinger. It was written by one of the band's guitarists, Joey Molland, and it appeared on the band's final recorded studio album, Say No More.

== Release and reception ==
"Because I Love You" was released as the fourth track on Badfinger's 1981 album, Say No More, which was the second made after the 1975 suicide of former guitarist Pete Ham. That same year, it saw single release in America (the final of three singles from Say No More, with one of its predecessors, "Hold On", hitting No. 56 on the Billboard Hot 100.) backed with the Tom Evans penned track, "Too Hung Up on You" (also from Say No More.) The single did not chart.

AllMusic critic William Ruhlmann said that "on 'Because I Love You,' they sound like the Raspberries trying to sound like the Beatles." Despite this comment, he still cited the song as a highlight from the Say No More album. Record World said that it "bursts with pop exuberance" and that "the emo-tional vocal plea and keyboard-laced rhythm are contagious.
