= Meanwhile, back at the ranch =

English phrase

"Meanwhile, back at the ranch..." is a catch phrase that appears in a variety of contexts. For example, it may be employed by narrators of American cowboy movies and TV shows to indicate a segue from one scene to another. The expression may have originated as a stock intertitle in the silent movies and at first the reference to the ranch was literal, but this may be apocryphal as no known film actually has this intertitle. The phrase "Meantime, back at the ranch..." opens Chapter VI of Zane Grey's 1912 novel Riders of the Purple Sage. Later, as the phrase became a cliché, it was used more and more loosely and with a growing sense of mockery or levity, often with a vague focus. In this manifestation the phrase came into common use in unrelated contexts.

"Meanwhile, back at the ranch" is the title of a children's book by Trinka Hakes Noble; a crime novel by Kinky Friedman; of the first album of the German country band Texas Lightning; and is the root of the name of the English band Meanwhile, back in Communist Russia... (1999-2004). It is also the name of a song by Badfinger from the album Wish You Were Here (1974).

"Meanwhile back at the ranch" was also the name that Alfred Hitchcock gave to a piece of storytelling advice he gave to filmmakers, whereby you structure the story as two parallel storylines, and cut from the first to the second just as the first reaches its peak. Contemporary filmmaker John Sturges quoted Hitchcock as saying, "the name of making movies is meanwhile back at the ranch. He's absolutely right. You want to have two things going. You reach the peak of one, you go to the other. You pick the other up just where you want it. When it loses interest, drop it. Meanwhile, back at the ranch."
