= Carry On Till Tomorrow =

"Carry on Till Tomorrow"

Single by Badfinger

from the album Magic Christian Music
- A-side: "No Matter What" (US)
- Released: 4:47 (album); 3:38 (single)
- Recorded: 22, 25, 26-27 August 1969
- Studio: EMI Studios, London
- Label: Apple
- Songwriters: Tom Evans, Pete Ham
- Producer: Paul McCartney

"Carry on Till Tomorrow" is a song written by Tom Evans and Pete Ham that was first released on Badfinger's 1970 album Magic Christian Music. It was also used in the film The Magic Christian, starring Ringo Starr and Peter Sellers. An edited version was later used as the b-side of Badfinger's single "No Matter What" in the United States.

== Writing and recording ==
"Carry on Till Tomorrow" was produced by Paul McCartney. It was one of three songs on Magic Christian Music that was produced by McCartney, the others being "Rock of All Ages" and the single "Come and Get It". Beatle producer George Martin wrote the score for the string instruments.

The song was originally intended for the film Magic Christian Music. McCartney had been commissioned to write the music for the film, but after playing Badfinger's recording of "Come and Get It" the movie company agreed that Badfinger could handle the music. According to Evans:

We saw the opening of the film and Paul gave us his impression, mentioning a 'Simon and Garfunkel' type of style. Pete and I went back and wrote "Carry on Till Tomorrow," which we were pleased with. Paul liked the song and brought us to Abbey Road Studios. He gave us leeway, added a few ideas, and produced it. He was very free in his approach.

Drummer Mike Gibbins said "This was a test of our strengths, our potential. We only saw rough cuts. It was difficult for us to imagine the total finished film."

== Lyrics and music ==
The song is in a folk music style influenced by Simon and Garfunkel. Evans sings the lead vocal. The lyrics are influenced by the opening title sequence of The Magic Christian, in which the wealthy character played by Peter Sellers helps the downcast character played by Ringo Starr. Allmusic critic Joe Viglione noted that the song contains "poignant, troubled" lyrics such as the line "For my life's too short for waiting...There's no reason to look back. Carry on." Viglione also noted a similarity of some of the melody with the theme song from the television show Gilligan's Island. The instrumentation incorporates string instruments backing the folk guitar that generally play softly and gently, but the quiet is punctuated a couple of times by louder bursts of electric guitar played by Ham. At the end, the strings swell to a climax as the electric guitar comes in one last time.

== Reception ==
Badfinger biographer Robert Day-Webb called the song a "beautiful and heart-rending ballad" and said that "This magnificently moody and atmospheric number oozes class" and particularly praised the string score and the coda. Allmusic critic Stephen Thomas Erlewine described "Carry on Till Tomorrow" as a "dreamy post-psych pop [tune] driven by strong hooks and harmonies." Rolling Stone critic John Mendelsohn felt that it sounded similar to the Beatles' song "I'll Be Back", but with the addition of the "politely raunchy lead guitar into the middle." Roger Kaye of the Fort Worth Star-Telegram described it as an "early FM rock radio staple." Classic Rock History critic Janey Roberts rated "Carry on Till Tomorrow" as Badfinger's 6th best song.
