= I Miss You (Badfinger song) =

Single by Badfinger

from the album Badfinger
- B-side: "Shine On"
- Released: 20 March 1974
- Recorded: 1973
- Genre: Power pop
- Length: 2:36
- Label: Warner Bros. Records
- Songwriter: Pete Ham
- Producer: Chris Thomas

Badfinger singles chronology
| "Love Is Easy" (1974) | "I Miss You" (1974) | "Lost Inside Your Love" (1979) |

"I Miss You" is a song by the Welsh rock band Badfinger. Originally written by Pete Ham in 1967 and demoed by The Iveys, it served as the opening track and sole U.S. single for their first Warner Bros. LP, Badfinger.

== Release ==
"I Miss You" appeared on the Badfinger album in 1974 as the first track. That same year, the track was chosen to be the only single from the album in America (as well as Japan), where it was backed with the Ham/Evans track "Shine On" (also from Badfinger). It did not chart. The single was not released in Britain.

== Personnel ==
=== "I Miss You" ===
- Pete Ham – lead vocals, piano, ARP 2600, harmonium
- Tom Evans – harmony vocals

=== "Shine On" ===
- Pete Ham – lead vocals, acoustic guitar
- Tom Evans – bass, backing vocals
- Joey Molland – electric guitar, backing vocals
- Mike Gibbins – drums, percussion

== Reception ==
"I Miss You" generally received positive feedback from critics. In his review of The Best of Badfinger, Vol. 2, AllMusic's Stephen Thomas Erlewine cited the track as a highlight from said album. Also from AllMusic, Matthew Greenwald said, "A bit of an odd choice to open Badfinger's Warner Bros. debut album, 'I Miss You' is, nevertheless, one of Pete Ham's finest-crafted ballads. The overtly (and almost cloying) music and lyrical thrust is nicely balanced out by Ham's (and the group's) vocals. The fact that Badfinger was a real pop/rock band made the song and its arrangement a bit too precious, but that does not detract from the elegance and quality of the song, which would have been an excellent cover for Linda Ronstadt or Harry Nilsson."

Classic Rock History critic Janey Roberts also rated it as Badfinger's 8th best song.
