= Magic Christian Music =

Studio album by Badfinger
- Released: 9 January 1970
- Recorded: 1 April 1969; 2 August - 1 October 1969
- Studios: EMI, Trident, and IBC, London
- Genres: Psychedelic pop; baroque pop
- Length: 41:58
- Label: Apple
- Producers: Paul McCartney, Mal Evans, Tony Visconti

Badfinger chronology
Maybe Tomorrow (1969)	Magic Christian Music (1970)	No Dice (1970)

Singles from Magic Christian Music
- 1. "Come and Get It" Released: 5 December 1969

Professional ratings
Review scores
Source	Rating
AllMusic	3/5 stars
The Encyclopedia of Popular Music	3/5 stars
Mojo	2/5 stars
MusicHound Rock	2/5
Rolling Stone	(positive)
Tom Hull	B+

Magic Christian Music is the second studio album by the Welsh rock band Badfinger, released on 9 January 1970 on Apple Records. It was their first release under the Badfinger name, having previously released the album Maybe Tomorrow in 1969 under the name The Iveys. It includes the band's first international hit, "Come and Get It", written and produced for them by Paul McCartney.

Of the fourteen tracks, seven were newly recorded for the album while the remaining songs were recycled from Maybe Tomorrow, which had seen only limited release in a handful of international markets, including the singles "Maybe Tomorrow" and "Dear Angie". Three of the new tracks were featured in the film The Magic Christian, which also gives the album its title. However, Magic Christian Music is not an official soundtrack album for the film.

== History ==
The film soundtrack for The Magic Christian featured three new songs by Badfinger that had been commissioned for the film, including their US/UK top-10 hit "Come and Get It"', which opened the film, and "Carry on Till Tomorrow", the title theme. The soundtrack album, which also included incidental music by Ken Thorne, had originally been scheduled for release on Apple Records, but the addition of the Thunderclap Newman song "Something in the Air" to the movie prevented that. Instead, the soundtrack album was released on the little-known Commonwealth United Records label in the US and on Pye in the UK. As a result, it received little promotion in the US and remained mostly unknown to American record buyers.

To capitalize on this gap, Apple Records released its own "pseudo-soundtrack". Apple combined the film's three Badfinger songs with four unreleased songs and seven older tracks (released by the group when they were still known as the Iveys) on the album Maybe Tomorrow, which had been quickly pulled off the market in 1969 after having only been released in Germany, Japan and Italy. The previously released Iveys songs were specially re-mixed for this album, significantly improving their sound quality in the process. One of them, "Fisherman", was also edited for this release.

The three Badfinger tracks used in the film -- "Come and Get It", "Rock of All Ages" and "Carry on Till Tomorrow"—bear the strongest "Beatle connection". They were produced by Paul McCartney (the first was also composed by McCartney), and the strings on "Carry on Till Tomorrow" were arranged and conducted by Beatles producer George Martin. The other tracks on the album were produced by Tony Visconti (five songs, including both Iveys singles) and Mal Evans (five songs).

Badfinger's line-up on these tracks includes bassist/vocalist Ron Griffiths, but Evans doubled on bass on "Midnight Sun", "Crimson Ship" and "Rock of All Ages" after Griffiths fell ill during the sessions. Griffiths departed The Iveys at the end of the McCartney sessions in late 1969, prior to the name change from The Iveys to Badfinger, which led to his exclusion from the credits and pictures on the album (although Griffiths does appear on the picture sleeve for "Come and Get It"). Guitarist Joey Molland was eventually added as Griffiths' replacement, causing Tom Evans to move from guitar to bass, but Molland's addition came after the album art had been prepared, so only Pete Ham, Tom Evans and Mike Gibbins are pictured on the cover.

The album peaked at number 55 on the US charts.

== Track listing ==
The following track listing is from the original UK issue of the album, and is also replicated on CD reissues. The original American LP had a rearranged order and two tracks missing ("Angelique" and "Give It a Try").

- Tracks marked (*) were originally released by The Iveys on the album Maybe Tomorrow.

Side one
No.	Title	Writer(s)	Producer(s)	Length
1.	"Come and Get It"	Paul McCartney	Paul McCartney	2:21
2.	"Crimson Ship"	Pete Ham, Tom Evans, Mike Gibbins	Paul McCartney	3:42
3.	"Dear Angie" (*)	Ron Griffiths	Tony Visconti	2:39
4.	"Fisherman" (*)	Tom Evans	Mal Evans	2:24
5.	"Midnight Sun"	Pete Ham	Mal Evans	2:46
6.	"Beautiful and Blue" (*)	Tom Evans	Mal Evans	2:40
7.	"Rock of All Ages"	Pete Ham, Tom Evans, Mike Gibbins	Paul McCartney	3:16

Side two
No.	Title	Writer(s)	Producer(s)	Length
8.	"Carry on Till Tomorrow"	Pete Ham, Tom Evans	Paul McCartney	4:47
9.	"I'm in Love" (*)	Pete Ham	Tony Visconti	2:26
10.	"Walk Out in the Rain"	Pete Ham	Mal Evans	3:27
11.	"Angelique" (*)	Tom Evans	Tony Visconti	2:28
12.	"Knocking Down Our Home" (*)	Pete Ham	Mal Evans	3:40
13.	"Give It a Try"	Pete Ham, Tom Evans, Mike Gibbins, Ron Griffiths	Tony Visconti	2:31
14.	"Maybe Tomorrow" (*)	Tom Evans	Tony Visconti	2:51

1991 CD bonus tracks
No.	Title	Writer(s)	Producer(s)	Length
15.	"Storm in a Teacup"	Tom Evans	Mal Evans	2:31
16.	"Arthur"	Tom Evans	Mal Evans	3:20

2010 CD bonus tracks
No.	Title	Writer(s)	Producer(s)	Length
15.	"And Her Daddy's a Millionaire" (alternate version)	Pete Ham, Tom Evans	Tony Visconti	2:24
16.	"Mrs. Jones" (remix)	Pete Ham	Mal Evans	2:19
17.	"Sali Bloo" (mono mix; *)	Pete Ham	Tony Visconti	2:45
18.	"See-Saw Granpa" (mono mix; *)	Pete Ham	Mal Evans	3:32
19.	"I've Been Waiting" (unedited remix; *)	Pete Ham	Tony Visconti	5:55

Digital bonus tracks (2010 remaster)

20. "Dear Angie" (mono mix) – 2:35
21. "Think About the Good Times" (mono mix) – 2:22
22. "No Escaping Your Love" (mono mix) – 2:01
23. "Arthur" (remix) – 3:15
24. "Storm in a Teacup" (mono mix) – 2:30
25. "Yesterday Ain't Coming Back" (mono mix) – 2:55

== Personnel ==
- Pete Ham – lead and backing vocals, lead and rhythm guitars, keyboards
- Tom Evans – lead and backing vocals, rhythm guitar, bass guitar on "Crimson Ship", "Midnight Sun", and "Rock of All Ages"
- Ron Griffiths – bass guitar (except as noted), backing vocals, lead vocals on "Dear Angie" and "Give it A Try"
- Mike Gibbins – drums, vocals

Additional contributors

- Paul McCartney – piano on "Rock of All Ages", percussion on "Come and Get It"
- Nicky Hopkins – piano on "See-Saw Granpa"
- Bill Collins – piano on "Knocking Down Our Home"

== Charts ==
Chart (1970)	Peak position
US Billboard Top LPs	55
