= The Magic Christian (film) =

1969 British film by Joseph McGrath

- UK DVD cover
- Directed by: Joseph McGrath
- Screenplay by: Terry Southern; Joseph McGrath
- Additional material by: Graham Chapman; John Cleese; Peter Sellers
- Based on: The Magic Christian by Terry Southern
- Produced by: Denis O'Dell
- Starring: Peter Sellers; Ringo Starr; Richard Attenborough; Leonard Frey; Laurence Harvey; Christopher Lee; Spike Milligan; Raquel Welch; Wilfrid Hyde-White; Isabel Jeans; Caroline Blakiston
- Cinematography: Geoffrey Unsworth
- Edited by: Kevin Connor
- Music by: Ken Thorne
- Production company: Grand Films
- Distributed by: Commonwealth United Entertainment
- Release dates: 11 December 1969 (London); 11 February 1970 (US)
- Running time: 92 minutes
- Country: United Kingdom
- Language: English

The Magic Christian is a 1969 British satirical farce black comedy film directed by Joseph McGrath and starring Peter Sellers and Ringo Starr, with appearances by John Cleese, Graham Chapman, Raquel Welch, Spike Milligan, Christopher Lee, Richard Attenborough and Roman Polanski. The film, telling the story of an eccentric billionaire who spends his money orchestrating elaborate practical jokes, was loosely adapted from the 1959 comic novel The Magic Christian by the American author Terry Southern, who co-wrote the screenplay adaptation with McGrath.

The film also features pre-Monty Python appearances of John Cleese (credited) and an uncredited Graham Chapman, who had jointly written an earlier version of the film script. It also features an uncredited appearance by Yul Brynner performing "Mad About the Boy" as a drag artist.

Songs by Badfinger, including "Come and Get It" written by Paul McCartney, were used on the soundtrack. The official soundtrack album had other music as well as dialogue from the film. Badfinger released an album, Magic Christian Music, containing their three songs for the film.

The film received mostly negative reviews on release, citing its unrelenting and heavy-handed satire of capitalism, greed and human vanities.

== Plot ==
Sir Guy Grand, an eccentric billionaire, together with his newly adopted heir (a homeless man sleeping in the park), Youngman Grand, start playing elaborate practical jokes on people. A big spender, Grand does not mind handing out large sums of money to various people, bribing them to fulfill his whims, or shocking them by bringing down what they hold dear.

Their misadventures are designed as a display by Grand to his adoptive charge of the notion that "everyone has their price" – it just depends on the amount one is prepared to pay. They start from rather minor spoofs, such as bribing a Shakespearean actor to strip during a stage performance of Hamlet and persuading a traffic warden to take back a parking ticket and eat it (delighted by the size of the bribe, he eats its plastic cover too) and proceed with increasingly elaborate stunts involving higher social strata and wider audiences. As their conversation reveals, Grand sees his plots as "educational".

At Sotheby's art auction house, it is confided to Grand that an original portrait from the Rembrandt School might fetch £10,000 at auction. To the astonishment of the director, Mr. Dugdale, Grand makes a pre-auction bid of £30,000 for the painting and, having bought it, proceeds to cut the portrait's nose from the canvas with a pair of scissors, as a mortified Dugdale looks on in open-mouthed shock. In an elegant restaurant, he makes a loud show of wild gluttony, Grand being the restaurant's most prominent customer. In the annual Boat Race sports event, he bribes the coach of the Oxford rowing team to have them purposely ram the Cambridge boat, to win a screamingly unjust victory. In a traditional pheasant hunt, he uses an anti-aircraft gun to down the bird.

Guy and Youngman eventually buy tickets for the luxury liner The Magic Christian, along with the richest stratum of society. Guests seen boarding the ship include John Lennon, Yoko Ono, Jacqueline Kennedy and Aristotle Onassis (all played by lookalikes). In the beginning everything appears normal, and the ship apparently sets off. Soon, things start going wrong. A solitary drinker at the bar is approached by a transvestite cabaret singer, a vampire poses as a waiter, and a cinema film features the unsuccessful transplant of a black person's head onto a white person's body. Passengers begin to notice, through the ship's closed-circuit television, that their captain is in a drunken stupor and is carted off by a gorilla. In a crescendo of panic, the guests try to abandon ship. A group of them, shown the way by Youngman Grand, instead reach the machine room. There, the Priestess of the Whip, assisted by two topless drummers, commands more than a hundred slave girls. They are naked except for loincloths. Rowing five to an oar, their wrists are manacled and fastened by chains to the ceiling. As passengers finally find an exit, and lords and ladies stumble out in the daylight, it is discovered that the supposed ship was in fact a structure built inside a warehouse, and the passengers had never left London. As they break out, a large painted sign reading "SMASH CAPITALISM" can be seen on the inside wall of the warehouse. During the whole misadventure, the Grands look perfectly composed and cool.

Toward the end of the film, Guy fills up a huge vat with urine, blood and animal excrement and adds to it thousands of bank notes. Attracting a crowd of onlookers by announcing "Free money!", Grand successfully entices the city's workers to recover the cash. The sequence concludes with many members of the crowd submerging themselves, in order to retrieve money that had sunk beneath the surface, as the song "Something in the Air" by Thunderclap Newman is heard by the film's audience.

The film ends with both Guy and Youngman, having returned to the park where the film opened, bribing the park warden to allow them to sleep there, stating that this was a more direct method of achieving their (mostly unstated) ends.

== Cast ==
- Peter Sellers as Sir Guy Grand KG, KC, CBE
- Ringo Starr as Youngman Grand, Esq.
- Isabel Jeans as Dame Agnes Grand
- Caroline Blakiston as Hon. Esther Grand
- Spike Milligan as Traffic warden #27
- Richard Attenborough as Oxford coach
- Leonard Frey as Laurence Faggot (ship's psychiatrist)
- John Cleese as Mr. Dugdale (director in Sotheby's)
- Patrick Cargill as Auctioneer at Sotheby's
- Joan Benham as Socialite in Sotheby's
- Ferdy Mayne as Edouard (of Chez Edouard restaurant)
- Graham Stark as Waiter at Chez Edouard Restaurant
- Laurence Harvey as Hamlet
- Dennis Price as Winthrop
- Wilfrid Hyde-White as Capt. Reginald K. Klaus
- Christopher Lee as Ship's vampire
- Roman Polanski as Solitary drinker
- Raquel Welch as Priestess of the Whip
- Victor Maddern as Hot dog vendor
- Terence Alexander as Mad Major
- Peter Bayliss as Pompous Toff
- Clive Dunn as Sommelier
- Fred Emney as Fitzgibbon
- David Hutcheson as Lord Barry
- Hattie Jacques as Ginger Horton
- Edward Underdown as Prince Henry
- Jeremy Lloyd as Lord Hampton
- Peter Myers as Lord Kilgallon
- Roland Culver as Sir Herbert
- Michael Trubshawe as Sir Lionel
- David Lodge as Ship's guide
- Peter Graves as Lord at ship's bar (uncredited)
- Robert Raglan as Maltravers
- Frank Thornton as Police Inspector (uncredited)
- Michael Aspel as TV commentator (uncredited)
- Michael Barratt as TV commentator (uncredited)
- Harry Carpenter as TV commentator (uncredited)
- John Snagge as TV commentator (uncredited)
- Alan Whicker as TV commentator (uncredited)
- Graham Chapman as Oxford crewman (uncredited)
- James Laurenson as Oxford crewman (uncredited)
- Yul Brynner as Transvestite cabaret singer (uncredited)
- Ralph Michael as Man at bar (uncredited)
- John Le Mesurier as Sir John (uncredited)
- Guy Middleton as Duke of Mantisbriar (uncredited)
- Nosher Powell as Ike Jones (uncredited)
- Rita Webb as Woman in Park (uncredited)
- Jimmy Clitheroe as Passenger on Ship (uncredited)
- Sean Barry-Weske as John Lennon lookalike (uncredited)
- Kimberley Chung as Yoko Ono lookalike (uncredited)
- George Cooper as Losing Boxer's Second (uncredited)
- Rosemarie Hillcrest as Topless Galley Slave (uncredited)
- Edward Sinclair as Park attendant (uncredited)

== Production ==
=== Writing ===
Although Joseph McGrath co-wrote the adaptation with the American author Terry Southern, who wrote the original 1959 comic novel The Magic Christian, the screenplay differs considerably in content from the novel such as moving the story from America to London in the Swinging Sixties. Likewise the Youngman character was not in the original book, but was created for the film, with many of Sir Guy's early exploits in the novel adapted as Youngman's in the film.

=== Casting ===
Peter Sellers, who was cast as Sir Guy Grand, was known to have liked the book; he had given a copy to filmmaker Stanley Kubrick, who subsequently hired Southern as co-writer for Dr. Strangelove (1964), having decided to make the film as a black comedy/satire, rather than a straightforward thriller. The role of the orphan was played by Ringo Starr; it was written with John Lennon in mind. Starr and Sellers became good friends during the shoot. The film also features a host of British and American actors with brief roles in the film, many playing against type.

=== Filming ===
The British actor and dancer Lionel Blair was responsible for the film's choreography.

The scene involving the vat containing animal blood, urine and excrement was filmed at London's South Bank on a stretch of waste ground on which the National Theatre was later built. It was originally planned to film this climactic scene at the Statue of Liberty in New York, and (remarkably) the U.S. National Park Service agreed to a request to permit this. Sellers, Southern and McGrath travelled to New York on the Queen Elizabeth 2 (at a reported cost of US$10,000 [$87,800 today] per person) but the studio refused to pay for the shoot, and it had to be relocated to London.

=== Soundtrack ===
The film features the song "Come and Get It" written and produced by Paul McCartney and performed by Badfinger, a Welsh rock band promoted by Apple Records. The lyrics refer to Grand's schemes of bribing people to act according to his whims ("If you want it, here it is, come and get it"). Badfinger also performed two of their own compositions for the soundtrack, "Carry on Till Tomorrow" and "Rock of All Ages".

"Something in the Air" by Thunderclap Newman is used in the film.

== Release ==
The film had its world premiere at the Odeon Theatre in Kensington in London on 11 December 1969, attended by Princess Margaret with continuous performance at the cinema from 12 December.

== Reception ==
Most mainstream critics have been quite negative about the film, especially for its extensive use of black humour. Darrel Baxton, in his review for The Spinning Image, refers to the film as of "the school of savage sub-Bunuelian satire".

Christopher Null on filmcritic.com states that "it is way too over-the-top to make any profound statement".

== In popular culture ==
- The Simpsons television series episode "Homer vs. Dignity" follows the film's plot.
- Writer Grant Morrison named The Magic Christian as an inspiration for their series Batman Incorporated.

== DVD/Blu-ray ==
The Magic Christian was released on DVD and Blu-ray by Olive Films (under license from Paramount Pictures) on 28 May 2013.
