= Maybe Tomorrow (The Iveys song) =

Single by The Iveys

from the album Maybe Tomorrow
- B-side: "And Her Daddy's a Millionaire"
- Released: 15 November 1968
- Recorded: 9 August - 17 October 1968
- Studio: Trident Studios, London
- Genre: Baroque pop; psychedelic pop
- Length: 2:51
- Label: Apple
- Songwriter: Tom Evans
- Producer: Tony Visconti

The Iveys singles chronology
"Maybe Tomorrow" (1968)	"Dear Angie" (1969)

"Maybe Tomorrow" is a song composed and sung by guitarist Tom Evans of The Iveys, which was released as the group's first worldwide single on Apple Records. It also served as the title track for the album Maybe Tomorrow, and it was also included on the Badfinger album Magic Christian Music released in 1970.

== History ==
The Iveys were seen as a promising young Beatle-esque band by Apple Records, and the first single was chosen carefully. Ultimately, "Maybe Tomorrow" was chosen, in part because of the lush string orchestration added by producer Tony Visconti, and it was designated as Apple 5—the first single released by Apple after its initial, much-publicized release of four nearly-simultaneous singles at its launch. Paul McCartney personally assured The Iveys that the song would be a hit. However, the song flopped in the UK and only reached number 67 in the Billboard US charts. Despite that, it surprisingly reached number 1 in the Netherlands and was a major hit in much of continental Europe and in Japan.

Apple had planned for this song to be the title song of The Iveys' debut album because of its regional success. However, before the album was released, Allen Klein took over as head of Apple Corps. Klein promptly blocked release of the album except in places where "Maybe Tomorrow" had been a hit.

When Apple decided to include older songs on the "first" Badfinger release, the pseudo-soundtrack Magic Christian Music, both of The Iveys' singles were included. Thus, "Maybe Tomorrow" is also included as a Badfinger song, and it appears on both greatest hits albums of Badfinger that were released by Apple.

== Reception ==
Ultimate Classic Rock critic Michael Gallucci and Classic Rock History critic Janey Robert both rated it as Badfinger's 7th greatest song. Gallucci called it "a Beatlesque slice of British pop." Roberts called it a "great track."

== Personnel ==
- Tom Evans - lead vocals, rhythm guitar
- Pete Ham - backing vocals, rhythm and lead guitars
- Ron Griffiths - bass guitar
- Mike Gibbins - drums

== Covers ==
In 1971 the Mexican band "El Amor" covered the song in its self-titled debut album.
