= I Got You (Badfinger song) =

Single by Badfinger

from the album Say No More
- B-side: "Rock 'N' Roll Contract"
- Released: 7 April 1981
- Genre: Hard rock, power pop
- Length: 3:39
- Label: Radio/Atlantic
- Songwriter: Joey Molland
- Producers: Jack Richardson, Steve Wittmack

Badfinger singles chronology
"Hold On" (1981)	"I Got You" (1981)	"Because I Love You" (1981)

"I Got You" is a song by the Welsh rock band Badfinger. Written by guitarist Joey Molland, the song appeared on the band's album Say No More.

== Release ==
"I Got You" is the first track on Badfinger's 1981 album, Say No More. That same year, the song was released as the follow-up single to the band's previous Say No More single, "Hold On," backed with Tom Evans's "Rock 'N' Roll Contract", However, unlike its predecessor—which had reached No. 56 in America—it failed to chart. A follow-up to "I Got You" ("Because I Love You") was released, but it was unsuccessful. After these singles, the band split into two separate bands under the Badfinger name until bassist Tom Evans committed suicide in 1983.
