= Meanwhile Back at the Ranch/Should I Smoke =

"Meanwhile Back at the Ranch"/ "Should I Smoke"

Song by Badfinger

from the album Wish You Were Here
- Released: 14 October 1974
- Recorded: 1974
- Studio: Caribou Ranch, Nederland
- Genre: Power pop
- Length: 5:18
- Label: Warner Bros. Records
- Songwriters: Meanwhile Back at the Ranch: Pete Ham; Should I Smoke: Joey Molland
- Producer: Chris Thomas

"Meanwhile Back at the Ranch"/"Should I Smoke" is a medley released by the British power pop band Badfinger. The song was the closing track on their critically acclaimed but commercially unsuccessful album, Wish You Were Here. "Meanwhile Back at the Ranch" was written by Pete Ham, while "Should I Smoke" was penned by Joey Molland.

== Release ==
"Meanwhile Back at the Ranch"/"Should I Smoke" was first released on the Wish You Were Here album in October 1974, where it was the ninth and final track. However, when the album was pulled from shelves in 1975 due to legal problems, the track, as well as the other eight songs from said album, became difficult to find (Wish You Were Here eventually saw CD release in 2007.) "Meanwhile Back at the Ranch"/"Should I Smoke" has since appeared on many Badfinger compilation albums, such as The Very Best of Badfinger and The Best of Badfinger Vol. 2.

== Reception ==
Despite not being one of Badfinger's most famous songs, "Meanwhile Back at the Ranch"/"Should I Smoke" has been praised by critics and fans alike. AllMusic's Stephen Thomas Erlewine called the track a highlight from Wish You Were Here, while Matthew Greenwald of the same organization said of the song, "this piece is also one of the group's recorded masterpieces. A combination (à la the Beatles' 'A Day in the Life') of two separate songs that make up one huge piece, the song ended the album (and, unfortunately, the band's career) with a bang. Musically, it's one of the hardest-rocking pairs of songs that the group ever committed to tape. Like a cross between Abbey Road and some of the Who's finer efforts of the period, the song(s) rocks uncompromisingly hard while maintaining fabulous melodic core. The two pieces are also mutually nonexclusive as well, but joining each other with an undeniable grace. The orchestral guitar/horn coda is undoubtedly one of the most realized moments that Badfinger ever committed to vinyl. A true lost masterpiece."

Classic Rock critic Rob Hughes rated it Badfinger's 5th best song, saying that "This tough-rocking boogie spliced together Ham’s 'Meanwhile Back At The Ranch' with Joey Molland’s 'Should I Smoke?' to thrillingly epic effect." Ultimate Classic Rock critic Michael Gallucci rated it as Badfinger's 10th best song, calling it "one of their strongest album tracks." Goldmine critic Bill Kopp included "Name of the Game" as one of "5 wrongfully overlooked Badfinger songs."

According to music critic Richie Unterberger, Badfinger member Joey Molland said "'Meanwhile Back in the Ranch' was really, really on top form."
