= Come and Get It (Badfinger song) =

Song written by Paul McCartney and performed by Badfinger

- UK picture sleeve

Single by Badfinger

from the album Magic Christian Music
- B-side: "Rock of All Ages"
- Released: 5 December 1969
- Recorded: 2 August 1969
- Studio: EMI Studios, London
- Genre: Power pop
- Length: 2:22
- Label: Apple
- Songwriter: Paul McCartney
- Producer: Paul McCartney

Badfinger singles chronology
"Dear Angie" (1969)	"Come and Get It" (1969)	"No Matter What" (1970)

Music video
- "Come and Get It" on YouTube

"Come and Get It" is a song composed by English musician Paul McCartney for the 1969 film The Magic Christian. The song was performed by Badfinger, produced by McCartney and issued as a single 5 December 1969 in the UK, and 12 January 1970 in the US, on the Beatles' Apple label. It was the band's first release under the Badfinger name (having previously recorded as The Iveys) and was their international breakthrough, hitting the top 10 in both the UK and US singles charts.

== The Beatles (Paul McCartney) version ==
"Come and Get It"

Song by the Beatles

from the album Anthology 3
- Released: 28 October 1996
- Recorded: 24 July 1969
- Studio: EMI Studios, London
- Genre: Rock, pop
- Length: 2:30
- Label: Apple
- Songwriter: Paul McCartney
- Producer: George Martin

Paul McCartney recorded a solo demo of the song on 24 July 1969, after arriving early for a Beatles recording session for their Abbey Road album. Singing the double-tracked lead vocal and playing all the instruments, he laid down the vocals and piano on the first take, sang again and played maracas on the first overdub, then added drums, and finally put in the bass guitar track. It took less than an hour to finish. The biggest differences between the McCartney and Badfinger versions are a slower tempo and slightly higher key on the demo, and the use of three-part harmonies on the Badfinger single. Though McCartney was the only Beatle performing on the track, it was officially released as a Beatles song on the 1996 Anthology 3 compilation album and the 2019 Abbey Road re-release, having already appeared on various bootlegs. The 2019 re-mix featured a significant improvement in the recording's sonic quality.

== Badfinger version ==
On 2 August 1969, McCartney produced the studio version at EMI's Abbey Road Studios by the Apple band Badfinger (then called the Iveys) telling them, "Okay, it's got to be exactly like this demo." His "carrot" for the band was his offer to produce this song and two other Iveys' originals for the movie The Magic Christian, since he had a contract to supply three songs for it. The band followed his instructions.

McCartney auditioned each of the four Iveys to sing lead on "Come and Get It". Ultimately, he picked Tom Evans over the other three band members, Pete Ham, Ron Griffiths, and Mike Gibbins.

The single was released on Apple Records on 5 December 1969 in the UK, but not until 12 January 1970 in the US. "Come and Get It" was a hit single for the band, peaking at number 7 in the United States, and number 4 in the United Kingdom. It reached number 1 on the New Zealand Listener charts. It was the opening theme for the film The Magic Christian, starring Peter Sellers and Ringo Starr (it was also repeated during the movie's closing credits, with an additional string arrangement added). The UK picture sleeve for the single shows a kaleidoscopic montage of all four members of Badfinger that appear on the song, although bassist Ron Griffiths left the band before the single was released.

Cash Box called it "a fine teen track." Billboard called it "powerful."

Ultimate Classic Rock critic Michael Gallucci and Classic Rock History critic Janey Robert both rated "Come and Get It" as Badfinger's greatest song. Gallucci called it the highlight of Magic Christian Music. Roberts called it Badfinger's signature song. Classic Rock critic Rob Hughes rated it as Badfinger's 3rd greatest song, saying that the band "added lustrous three-part harmonies" to McCartney's original.

In 1978 a re-formed version of Badfinger re-recorded "Come and Get It" for K-tel Records, with Evans again singing lead. This served to provide a demo recording to give to Elektra Records, and resulted in the Airwaves album in 1979.

== Personnel ==
The Beatles (Paul McCartney) version

- Paul McCartney – double-tracked lead vocals, piano, maracas, drums, tambourine, bass

Badfinger version

- Tom Evans – lead vocals, maracas
- Pete Ham – backing vocals, piano
- Ron Griffiths – backing vocals, bass guitar
- Mike Gibbins – drums
- Paul McCartney – tambourine, production
- Tony Clark – engineer

== Chart performance ==
=== Weekly charts ===
Chart (1970)	Peak position
Australia (Kent Music Report)	14
Canada Top Singles (RPM)	4
Ireland (IRMA)	5
New Zealand (Listener)	1
UK Singles (OCC)	4
US Billboard Hot 100	7
US Cash Box Top 100	6

=== Year-end charts ===
Chart (1970)	Position
Canada	64
US Billboard Hot 100	48
US Cash Box	45
