= Say No More (Badfinger album) =

Studio album by Badfinger
- Released: 17 January 1981
- Recorded: September - October 1980
- Studios: International Sound, Miami
- Genre: Power pop
- Length: 37:04
- Label: Radio/Atlantic
- Producers: Jack Richardson, Steve Wittmack

Badfinger chronology
Airwaves (1979)	Say No More (1981)	Day After Day: Live (1990)

Singles from Say No More
- 1. "Hold On" Released: 1981; 2. "I Got You" Released: 1981; 3. "Because I Love You" Released: 1981

Professional ratings
Review scores
Source	Rating
AllMusic	2/5 stars

Say No More is the ninth studio album recorded by the Welsh rock band Badfinger that contained new material. Issued in January 1981 on Radio Records, the LP was the second and last reunion by Tom Evans and Joey Molland, after the suicide of band founder Pete Ham in 1975. The album was recorded in Miami, Florida, by Evans, Molland, pianist and organist Tony Kaye (formerly of Yes), guitarist Glen Sherba and drummer Richard Bryans and was co-produced by Jack Richardson.

Kaye had been invited to join the band by Evans after Airwaves, as the two had been friends. Kaye later reflected on the album, "I really kind of like that album. It had a certain something. Of course, we recorded it in Miami. The band was living in a house on Key Biscayne. There was a lot of drinking and stuff going on. But the band was performing in the studio and we’d go and play a bar in Key Biscayne after we finished. We became very close, actually."

Rockier than its predecessor Airwaves, this final outing by Badfinger produced one semi-successful single with the song "Hold On", which reached No. 56 on the US Billboard charts in 1981. The album peaked at only No. 155 on the US Billboard albums chart. It featured cover art by artist Peter Max. The album was not given an official release in the UK.

Evans' song "Rock 'N' Roll Contract" had originally been recorded for the band for the Head First album, but that album was still unreleased at the time of Say No More.

== Track listing ==
Side one

1. "I Got You" (Joey Molland) – 3:39
2. "Come On" (Tom Evans) – 3:24
3. "Hold On" (Evans/Joe Tansin) – 3:24
4. "Because I Love You" (Molland) – 2:49
5. "Rock 'N' Roll Contract" (Evans) – 5:37

Side two

1. "Passin' Time" (Molland) – 3:30
2. "Three Time Loser" (Molland) – 3:30
3. "Too Hung Up on You" (Evans) – 3:21
4. "Crocadillo" (Evans/Rod Roach) – 3:21
5. "No More" (Molland) – 4:29

== Personnel ==
- Tom Evans – bass, guitar, vocals
- Joey Molland – guitar, piano, vocals
- Glenn Sherba – guitar
- Tony Kaye – organ, piano
- Richard Bryans – drums

== Charts ==
Chart (1981)	Peak position
US Billboard 200	155
