= Maybe Tomorrow (The Iveys album) =

Studio album by the Iveys
- Released: 4 July 1969
- Recorded: 23 July 1968 - 5 March 1969
- Studios: Trident, and Olympic; (London, England)
- Genre: Psychedelic pop
- Length: 45:14
- Label: Apple
- Producers: Tony Visconti; Mal Evans

The Iveys chronology
Maybe Tomorrow (1969)	Magic Christian Music (1970)

Singles from Maybe Tomorrow
- 1. "Maybe Tomorrow" Released: 15 November 1968; 2. "Dear Angie" Released: 18 July 1969

Professional ratings
Review scores
Source	Rating
Allmusic	4.5/5 stars

Maybe Tomorrow is the debut album by the Welsh rock band Badfinger. Maybe Tomorrow is the only release under the band's original name as the Iveys. It was issued in 1969 on the Apple label in Japan, West Germany and Italy. Although the album was scheduled to be released worldwide, the release in the US and UK at that time was halted without explanation. Many reasons for halting the album have been suggested by the band and Apple employees, but the most common theory is that Apple's newly hired president, Allen Klein, stopped all non-Beatle releases on Apple until he could examine the company's finances, which were in disarray at the time.

A majority of the album's songs were later issued as Badfinger songs on the Badfinger album Magic Christian Music.

== Background ==
The Iveys (later known as Badfinger) were a successful live act on the London circuit when they attracted the attention of Apple employee Mal Evans in early 1968. It was through Evans' perseverance that demonstration recordings made by the group were presented to The Beatles (Apple's presidents). Although the band was initially waived by Paul McCartney and John Lennon, the former relented as more impressive Iveys tapes were brought in by Evans.

The group signed with Apple in July 1968 and began making recordings immediately upon their arrival. With the incentive of releasing a worthwhile single, the band was not focused on compiling an LP. Maybe Tomorrow was therefore culled from various studio recordings the group made during a 12-month period, mostly under the production of Tony Visconti. The songs on the LP vary widely among pop, rock, and psychedelic sounds. With few exceptions, they do not resemble the sound Badfinger would later become known for. The sound quality of the Iveys album is relatively poor due to a "muddy" mix. When some of these tracks were carefully re-mixed for Badfinger's debut album Magic Christian Music the sound quality was significantly improved.

The title track was released as an Apple single in 1968 and enjoyed limited success in regional markets—for example, reaching number 1 in the Netherlands.

Due to Badfinger's subsequent fame and the album's limited release, Maybe Tomorrow became an expensive collectible for many years, often earning between $200 and $400 US dollars for a single used copy. Although a 1990s re-release of the album on CD format curbed demand for the original album, the CD itself became collectible because of its limited run.

For reasons unknown, the CD edition of "Maybe Tomorrow" has the stereo channels reversed and the song "Sali Bloo" (pronounced "Sally Blue") is missing the wah-wah guitar intro found on the original album.

== Track listing ==
Songs marked with an asterisk (*) also appear on Magic Christian Music.

Side one
No.	Title	Writer(s)	Length
1.	"See-Saw Granpa"	Pete Ham, arr. John Barham and Tom Evans	3:33
2.	"Beautiful and Blue" (*)	Evans, arr. Barham and Evans	2:38
3.	"Dear Angie" (*)	Ron Griffiths	2:39
4.	"Think About the Good Times"	Mike Gibbins	2:21
5.	"Yesterday Ain't Coming Back"	Ham, Evans	2:57
6.	"Fisherman" (*)	Evans, arr. Barham and Evans	3:09

Side two
No.	Title	Writer(s)	Length
7.	"Maybe Tomorrow" (*)	Evans	2:52
8.	"Sali Bloo"	Ham	2:35
9.	"Angelique" (*)	Evans	2:26
10.	"I'm in Love" (*)	Ham	2:28
11.	"They're Knocking Down Our Home" (*)	Ham, arr. Barham and Evans	3:41
12.	"I've Been Waiting"	Ham	5:15

1992 CD bonus tracks
No.	Title	Writer(s)	Length
13.	"No Escaping Your Love"	Evans	2:12
14.	"Mrs. Jones"	Ham	2:15
15.	"And Her Daddy's a Millionaire"	Ham, Evans	2:08
16.	"Looking for My Baby"	Ham	2:08

=== Sleeve notes ===
On the sleeve Derek Taylor writes that these "four very nice kids [...] were not, nor are they now adventurous innovators, but they are ready, they are ready to be. The Iveys can sing and they play tight, rich stuff, write it too; they can write anything. They are lovely lads. [...] For them all Apple feels love and admiration."

== Personnel ==
The Iveys

- Pete Ham – lead and backing vocals, lead guitar, keyboards
- Tom Evans – lead and backing vocals, rhythm guitar
- Ron Griffiths – bass guitar, lead and backing vocals
- Mike Gibbins – drums, percussion, lead and backing vocals

Other performers

- Bill Collins – piano on "Knocking Down Our Home"
- Nicky Hopkins – piano on "See-Saw Granpa"

Technical

- Tony Visconti – producer (tracks 3–5, 7–10, 12)
- Mal Evans – producer (tracks 1–2, 6, 11)
- The Iveys – producers ("Looking for My Baby")
