= Love Is Gonna Come at Last =

Single by Badfinger

from the album Airwaves
- B-side: "Sail Away"
- Released: March 1979 (US); 13 July 1979 (UK)
- Genre: Power pop
- Length: 3:37
- Label: Radio/Elektra
- Songwriter: Joey Molland
- Producer: David Malloy

Badfinger singles chronology
| "Lost Inside Your Love" (1979) | "Love Is Gonna Come at Last" (1979) | "Hold On" (1981) |

"Love Is Gonna Come at Last" is a song by the Welsh rock band Badfinger. Written by guitarist Joey Molland, "Love Is Gonna Come at Last" appeared on the band's 1979 album, Airwaves.

== Release ==
"Love Is Gonna Come at Last" was released on Airwaves, Badfinger's first album since original guitarist Pete Ham committed suicide in 1975. Despite its billing as Badfinger's "comeback album," it failed to make much of an impression on listeners, only hitting No. 125 in America. "Love Is Gonna Come at Last" was released as the album's lead single in the US. Backed with the Tom Evans-penned "Sail Away" (also from Airwaves), the single was the only one from Airwaves to chart, reaching No. 69 on the Billboard Hot 100 in the United States.

== Reception ==
Similarly to the other tracks on Airwaves, "Love Is Gonna Come at Last" received lukewarm reception. Cash Box said it has a "moderate strumming beat, slide guitar fills and good singing" and "fine layered guitar work and upbeat feel." AllMusic's Matthew Greenwald said on the song, "Another decent track from the Badfinger reunion album of 1977 on Elektra Records, 'Love Is Gonna Come at Last' is a fine effort. Although it ended up coming across as a recording that has all of the "dead" qualities of 1970s pop/arena rock, it's one of Joey Molland's finer efforts of the period, and certainly as good as fodder from such artists as Peter Frampton, who was vogue at the time." William Ruhlmann (also of AllMusic) said that the track "evokes their old mentors [the Beatles]." Ultimate Classic Rock critic Michael Gallucci rated it as Badfinger's 9th best song, calling it "retro-sounding."

=== Chart performance ===
| Chart (1979) | Peak position |
|---|---|
| US Billboard Hot 100 | 69 |
