= Dear Angie =

1969 single by The Iveys

Single by The Iveys

from the album Maybe Tomorrow
- B-side: "No Escaping Your Love"
- Released: 18 July 1969
- Recorded: 25, 30 September 1968
- Studio: Trident Studios, London
- Genre: Pop
- Length: 2:38
- Label: Apple
- Songwriter: Ron Griffiths
- Producer: Tony Visconti

The Iveys singles chronology
"Maybe Tomorrow" (1968)	"Dear Angie" (1969)	"Come And Get It" (1969)

"Dear Angie" is a song composed and sung by bassist Ron Griffiths of The Iveys for the album Maybe Tomorrow. It was released as the group's second single in some European markets, and it was also included on the Badfinger album Magic Christian Music.

== History ==
Although The Iveys' first single on Apple Records, "Maybe Tomorrow", had flopped in the UK, it surprisingly reached number 1 in the Netherlands. As a result, Apple wanted to release a second Iveys single to give the group another chance for success. Producer Tony Visconti selected "Dear Angie", and it was scheduled for worldwide release as Apple 14, simultaneously with the Maybe Tomorrow album.

However, before the single and album were released, Allan Klein took over as head of Apple Corps. Klein promptly blocked release of both of The Iveys' records except in places where "Maybe Tomorrow" had been a hit, such as continental Europe and Japan. Thus, The Iveys were relegated to the side at Apple, until Paul McCartney took an interest in the band's future.

Ironically, an Apple promotional EP for Walls Ice Cream that included a song by The Iveys ("Storm in a Teacup") was released in the UK on the same date that "Dear Angie" was released in continental Europe and Japan.

When Apple decided to include older songs on the "first" Badfinger release, the pseudo-soundtrack Magic Christian Music, both of The Iveys' singles were included. Thus, this is the only Ron Griffiths composition included on a Badfinger album, since Ron quit the group just prior to the name change from The Iveys to Badfinger.

== Personnel ==
- Ron Griffiths – lead vocals, bass guitar
- Tom Evans – backing vocals, rhythm guitar
- Pete Ham – backing vocals, lead guitar
- Mike Gibbins – drums
