= Hold On (Badfinger song) =

Single by Badfinger

from the album Say No More
- B-side: "Passin' Time"
- Released: 2 February 1981
- Genre: Power pop
- Length: 3:24
- Label: Radio/Atlantic
- Songwriter: Tom Evans/Joe Tansin
- Producers: Jack Richardson, Steve Wittmack

Badfinger singles chronology
"Love Is Gonna Come at Last" (1979)	"Hold On" (1981)	"I Got You" (1981)

"Hold On" is the third track from Badfinger's 1981 album Say No More. Co-written by Tom Evans and Joe Tansin (who had actually left the band prior to the recording of Say No More and was not credited on the original release), the track was their second to last new single (the last being "I Got You", also from Say No More).

== Release and reception ==
"Hold On" was first released in 1981 on Say No More. However, that same year, the song was released as a single in the US (the first from Say No More), backed with the Joey Molland-written song, "Passin' Time". It was Badfinger's final charting single (and highest charting since "Baby Blue"), reaching number 56 on the Billboard Hot 100, and number 67 on Cashbox. Its follow-up, "I Got You", did not chart.

AllMusic's Stephen Thomas Erlewine retrospectively described the track as "a shadow of former glories". Ultimate Classic Rock critic Michael Gallucci rated it as Badfinger's eighth best song.
