= Love Is Easy (Badfinger song) =

Single by Badfinger

from the album Badfinger
- B-side: "My Heart Goes Out"
- Released: 19 October 1973
- Recorded: 7 September 1973
- Studio: AIR Studios, London
- Genre: Power pop
- Length: 3:08
- Label: Warner Bros. Records
- Songwriter: Joey Molland
- Producer: Chris Thomas

Badfinger singles chronology
"Apple of My Eye" (1973)	"Love Is Easy" (1973)	"I Miss You" (1974)

"Love Is Easy" is a song by the Welsh rock band Badfinger. Released on their album Badfinger, the song was written by one of the band's guitarists, Joey Molland.

== Release ==
"Love Is Easy" is the third track on the 1974 Badfinger album. It was previously released in October 1973 as a single in Britain (as well as in Germany, New Zealand, South Africa and Uruguay), backed with another album track, the Mike Gibbins-written "My Heart Goes Out". It was a commercial failure, however, not charting in the UK. A second single from Badfinger, "I Miss You," was released in America and Japan, but that single still did not garner any commercial appeal.

A live version of the song also appeared on the live album BBC in Concert 1972–1973.

== Reception ==
Stephen Thomas Erlewine, a critic from the company AllMusic, said in his review of the Badfinger album that "Love Is Easy" "has a pleasing pop hook."
