= Airwaves (Badfinger album) =

Studio album by Badfinger
- Released: March 1979
- Recorded: October - December 1978
- Studios: Stickley Manor, Los Angeles
- Genre: Power pop
- Length: 30:49
- Label: Elektra
- Producer: David Malloy

Badfinger chronology
Wish You Were Here (1974)	Airwaves (1979)	Say No More (1981)

Singles from Airwaves
- 1. "Love Is Gonna Come at Last" Released: March 1979 (US); 2. "Lost Inside Your Love" Released: May 1979 (UK)

Professional ratings
Review scores
Source	Rating
AllMusic	3.5/5 stars
Music Week	2/4 stars

Airwaves is the eighth studio album released by the Welsh rock band Badfinger in 1979 on the Elektra label (a sister label to Warner Bros. Records, their previous label), the seventh album released that was credited to Badfinger. Anticipated as a comeback album for the group at the time, expectations were not quite realised, as the "group" now consisted of just the duo of Tom Evans and Joey Molland, accompanied by guitarist Joe Tansin and various session musicians.

== History ==
Following the "hold" placed on the last Badfinger album, Head First, and the suicide of group co-founder Pete Ham in 1975, Badfinger disbanded, and the remaining members joined various other groups or dropped out of music for the next two years.

At the behest of Chicago musicians Joe Tansin (guitar/vocals) and Kenny Harck (drums), the then-unemployed Joey Molland formed a new group with the duo in Los Angeles. Molland later enticed his fellow former Badfinger member Tom Evans to join the unnamed band.

After the band shopped demonstration records around the L.A. area, they discovered they would have more marketing power if they revived the Badfinger moniker. Although the name helped the group open doors to potential record labels, it also caused an inequality and friction between old and new Badfinger members within the band. As recordings commenced for the album, Harck was released by the band. Former Badfinger drummer Mike Gibbins auditioned for the group but was not hired, and session musician Andy Newmark was finally brought in for the drum tracks. Tansin, whose songs were largely bypassed during production in favour of Evans and Molland tunes, quit the group immediately upon the album's completion.

With a short running time and basically only eight songs, Airwaves did not leave a strong impression on music reviewers upon its release. Critics also complained about the album's "West coast" production and the loss of the famous Badfinger sound. Molland, however, has often defended the album and its production. The band toured frequently in support of the album, but sales figures failed to garner optimism with Elektra and the label passed on issuing a follow-up LP.

Two singles were released from the album. "Lost Inside Your Love" did not enter the US charts, "Love Is Gonna Come at Last" managed a peak position at number 69 on Billboard. The actual album peaked at number 125 on the US charts.

== Track listing ==
=== Side one ===
1. "Airwaves" (Evans/Molland) – 0:29
2. "Look Out California" (Evans) – 3:27
3. "Lost Inside Your Love" (Evans) – 2:42
4. "Love Is Gonna Come at Last" (Molland) – 3:37
5. "Sympathy" (Tansin) – 4:28

=== Side two ===
1. "The Winner" (Tansin) – 3:26
2. "The Dreamer" (Molland) – 5:20
3. "Come Down Hard" (Molland) – 3:48
4. "Sail Away" (Evans) – 3:31

=== 1997 CD bonus tracks ===
10. "One More Time" (Tansin) – 2:57 +
11. "Send Me Your Love" (Tansin) – 4:12 +
12. "Steal My Heart" (Tansin) – 3:56 +
13. "Love Can't Hide" (Molland/Tansin) – 2:45 ++
14. "Can You Feel the Rain" (Tansin) – 4:03 +
- + Produced by Joe Tansin
- ++ Produced by Joey Molland

== Personnel ==
As listed in liner notes of 1999 re-issue.

Badfinger

- Tom Evans – lead vocals (1–3, 5, 6, 9), backing vocals (2–7, 9, 10), bass (2, 3, 5–8)
- Joey Molland – lead vocals (4–8, 13), backing vocals (3–7), electric and acoustic guitars (1–5, 7, 8, 10, 13), electric piano (5)

Additional musicians

- Joe Tansin – lead vocals (10–12, 14), co-lead vocal (6), backing vocals (3, 4, 6, 10, 14), electric and acoustic guitars (2, 3, 5–8, 10–12, 14), mandolin (14), keyboards (11, 12)
- Peter Clark – "leg, hands and feet" (1)
- Nicky Hopkins – piano (3, 7, 9), Hammond organ (7)
- Duane Hitchings – synthesizer (2, 6), piano (6)
- Harry Pulver Jr. – piano (13)
- Scott Greer – piano (14)
- Rick Salon – slide guitar (14)
- Tom Lecher – bass (13)
- Ken Harck – drums (2, 5), cardboard box (10), tom-toms (12)
- Andy Newmark – drums (3, 8)
- Steve Forman – drums (6), percussion (4, 5, 7)
- Bob Millea – drums (13)
- Barry Sperti – saxophone (12)
- David Malloy – backing vocals (2)
- Dean Ford – backing vocals (14)
- David Campbell – string arrangement (9)

== Charts ==
Chart (1979)	Peak position
US Billboard 200	125
