= Baskervilles (musical group) =

- Origin: New York City, USA
- Genres: Pop, Indie, Rock
- Years active: 1997–present
- Labels: Secret Crush; Kitty Litter
- Members: Christoph Gerozissis; Stephanie Finucane; Rob Keith; Craig Van Orsdale

Baskervilles are a band made up of Christoph Gerozissis, Rob Keith, Stephanie Finucane and Craig Van Orsdale. Formed in New York City in 1997. They debuted as the Baskervils in 1993 in Tampa, fronted by Laura Taylor. During that time, they ran a self-published label called Baskervinyl Records.

== History ==
Taylor left the band in 1997 and the remaining Baskervils moved to New York City. Inspired by the Television Personalities, Blondie, The Kinks, Love, the Left Banke and the French Pop played by DJ Franco at the Vampyros Lesbos party in New York City. They changed their name to Baskervilles and turned their amplifiers down to perform high energy, keyboard driven pop at lower volumes. The lyrics were designed to be simple narratives and open ended romantic stories, many pertaining to New York City.

From 1997 to 2002, Baskervilles performed a handful of well received shows at the Mercury Lounge in the East Village. During that time, Baskervilles recorded 2 sessions at Mitch Easter's Fidelitorium studio in North Carolina and 1 session at Dubway Studios in New York City. The group made one trip outside of New York City in the summer of 2002 to perform at a museum opening at the Migros Museum in Zurich, Switzerland featuring the artwork of Yayoi Kusama and Michel Auder.

The band took a 2-year hiatus while Stephanie had a baby. Rob Keith and Christoph Gerozissis formed a nocturnal electro group called Autoparty and put out an album called Lumlight. The first Baskervilles show in two years happened at Sin-e’ on November 6, 2003, to celebrate the release of a compilation on Secret Crush Records called Stamp Collecting For Beginners, featuring the Baskervilles song After Work. Secret Crush Records released the first Baskervilles album in spring of 2004 to great acclaim. The band followed up by releasing the punchy new wave inspired Midnight EP in 2005 with a tour of the west coast of the United States.

During the second half of 2005 and early 2006, the Baskervilles worked on album #3 and a video for Midnight At The Underground Club, directed by Jake Hensberry. The Baskervilles delayed work on album #3 to write a 4-song EP for Kitty Litter Records, however somewhere along the line, the deal fell through, which led to 'Twilight 14', a 14-month-long free song giveaway. The songs of 'Twilight 14' were distributed monthly with cover artwork. They could be downloaded from the official Baskervilles website in MP3 format, and promotional postcards were sent out to fans through snail mail. The release date for the Baskervilles Twilight CD was June 3, 2008.

== Discography ==
=== Baskervilles - 2004 - 10 tracks ===
Released on Secret Crush Records produced by Mitch Easter (tracks 5,7,8,9,10) and Al Houghton (tracks 1,2,3,4 and 6)

1. After Work
2. John Riley And The Housewives Who Love Him
3. Have You Seen The Ideal?
4. This Was The Weekend
5. Opening On Thompson
6. The Pages Of Lisa, Bright And Dark
7. Day One, Amada Year
8. A Free Show In Battery Park
9. Anthem For The Acquaintances
10. That Is The Scene (Baskervilles Vs Autoparty)

=== Midnight EP - 2005 - 7 tracks ===
Released on Secret Crush Records produced by Rob Keith

1. Midnight At The Underground Club
2. I Danced With Kate Moss
3. Black Boots (Pt.2)
4. It Can Happen To You
5. Another Free Show In Battery Park
6. Pictures Of You
7. La Grande Illusion

=== Twilight 14 - 2008 - 14 tracks ===
produced by Mitch Easter and Rob Keith

1. A Little More Time
2. Daylight To Twilight
3. Smash
4. Caught In A Crosswalk
5. Everybody Looks, Not Everybody Finds
6. Slip A Little and boom!
7. Staying There For A While
8. Have You Seen Them?
9. It's A Red Fade That Leaves In A Warm Way
10. Where Did My Summer Go?
11. Sweet And Sour
12. Make Me Smile (Come Up And See Me)
13. Moves
14. The Apartment

== Baskervilles Side Project - Autoparty ==
During Baskervilles's hiatus, members Rob Keith and Christoph Gerozissis formed a separate band and wrote another album of ambient electropop. Their band was called 'Autoparty', and they released a 10 track album titled 'Lumlight' in 2004. 'Autoparty' was responsible for track 10, 'That Is The Scene', on Baskervilles's debut self-titled album.

=== Lumlight - 2004 - 10 tracks ===
Released on

1. Lumlight
2. Je Je Boom
3. Nick Is In A Crawl
4. The First Song Was Lumlight
5. You Are Next
6. You
7. From the Pool To The Bar
8. Motel
9. Easy Wonderful
10. The Sound Of Women
