= Badfinger =

British rock band (1961–1984)

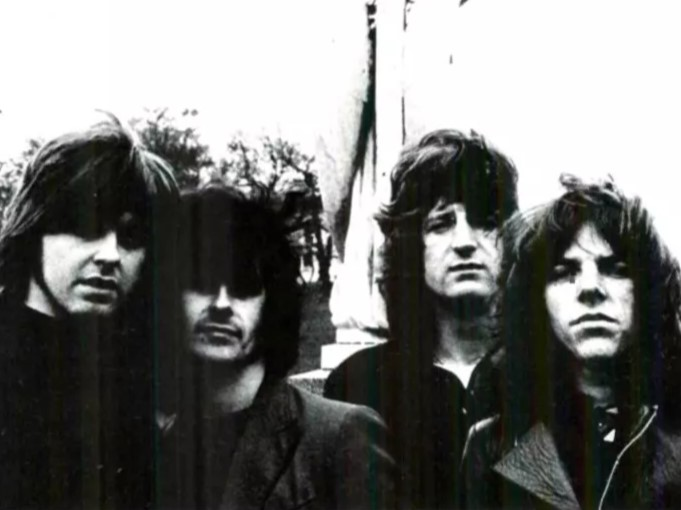
- Badfinger in 1970 (L–R: Molland, Evans, Ham, Gibbins)

Background information
- Also known as: The Iveys (1961–1969)
- Origin: Swansea, Wales
- Genres: Rock; power pop
- Years active: 1961–1975; 1978–1984
- Labels: Apple; Warner Bros.; Elektra; Radio
- Past members: Pete Ham; Tom Evans; Joey Molland; Mike Gibbins; (see Members section for others)
- Website: badfingersite.com (archived) at the Wayback Machine (archived 2019-05-21)

Badfinger were a British rock band formed in Swansea in 1961. Their best-known lineup consisted of Welshmen Pete Ham (rhythm guitar and lead vocals), Mike Gibbins (drums), and Englishmen Tom Evans (bass) and Joey Molland (lead guitar). Initially known as the Iveys, the band renamed themselves Badfinger, after the working title for the Beatles' 1967 song "With a Little Help from My Friends" ("Bad Finger Boogie"). From 1968 to 1973, Badfinger recorded five albums for Apple Records and toured extensively before they became embroiled in the chaos of Apple's dissolution. They are recognised for their influence on the 1970s power pop genre and are estimated to have sold 14 million records.

Badfinger had four consecutive worldwide hits from 1970 to 1972: "Come and Get It" (written and produced by Paul McCartney, 1970), "No Matter What" (produced by Mal Evans, 1970), "Day After Day" (produced by George Harrison, 1971), and "Baby Blue" (produced by Todd Rundgren, 1972). Their song "Without You" (1970) has been recorded many times, and became a UK and US No. 1 hit for Harry Nilsson in 1972 and a UK No. 1 for Mariah Carey in 1994. In 1972, "Without You" saw co-writers Ham and Evans receive the Ivor Novello Award for Best Song Musically and Lyrically from the Songwriters Guild of Great Britain.

After Apple Records folded in 1973, Badfinger struggled with a host of legal, managerial, and financial problems mostly due to fraud by their manager Stan Polley, leading to Ham's suicide in 1975. The surviving members struggled to rebuild their personal and professional lives against a backdrop of lawsuits that tied up the songwriters' royalty payments for years. Their subsequent albums floundered, as Molland and Evans alternated between cooperation and conflict in their attempts to revive and capitalize on the Badfinger legacy. Evans died by suicide in 1983, Gibbins died from a brain aneurysm in 2005, and Molland died from complications of diabetes in 2025. At the time of his death, Molland was the last surviving member of the group's classic lineup.

"Baby Blue" was featured in the finale of the American television series Breaking Bad, reviving its popularity among a new generation of listeners.

== 1961–1969: The Iveys ==
=== Early days ===
The Iveys formed in 1961 in Swansea, Wales from the Panthers, whose line-up consisted of Pete Ham (lead guitar), Ronald "Ron" Griffiths (bass guitar), David "Dai" Jenkins (rhythm guitar), and Roy Anderson (drums). After playing under various names, including the Black Velvets and the Wild Ones, by 1964 they had settled on the Iveys, after a street in Swansea called Ivey Place.

In March 1965, drummer Mike Gibbins joined the band following Anderson's departure. The group secured concerts around the Swansea area, opening for prominent British bands such as the Spencer Davis Group, the Who, the Moody Blues, and the Yardbirds.

By June 1966, William Daniel "Bill" Collins (the father of actor Lewis Collins) had started to manage the group. In December 1966, the group moved into Collins' home at 7 Park Avenue, Golders Green, London, sharing space with an act called the Mojos. The house was chronically overcrowded, so the only place to find any privacy was in a room equipped with a two-track recording machine.

The group performed a wide range of cover tunes on the London circuit, from Motown, blues, and soul to Top 40, psychedelia, and Beatles hits, which garnered interest from record labels. Ray Davies of the Kinks auditioned to produce them, recording three of their songs at a four-track demo studio in London's Old Kent Road on 15 January 1967: "Taxi" and "Sausage And Eggs", songs by Ham; and Griffiths' "I Believe in You Girl". On 8 December 1966, Collins and the group signed a five-year contract giving Collins a 20% share of net receipts, the same as the individual group members, but only after managerial expenses had been deducted. Collins said at the time, "Look, I can't promise you lads anything, except blood, sweat and tears." The group performed occasional concerts backing David Garrick while performing as the Iveys across the United Kingdom throughout the rest of the decade.

In August 1967, Dai Jenkins was asked to leave the group, and he was replaced by Liverpudlian guitarist Tom Evans (b. Thomas Evans Jr., 5 June 1947, Liverpool, d. 19 November 1983), formerly of Them Calderstones. Jenkins's departure was remembered by Griffiths as being "politely asked if he would step down", as Jenkins seemed more interested in girls than the music.

=== Signing to Apple ===
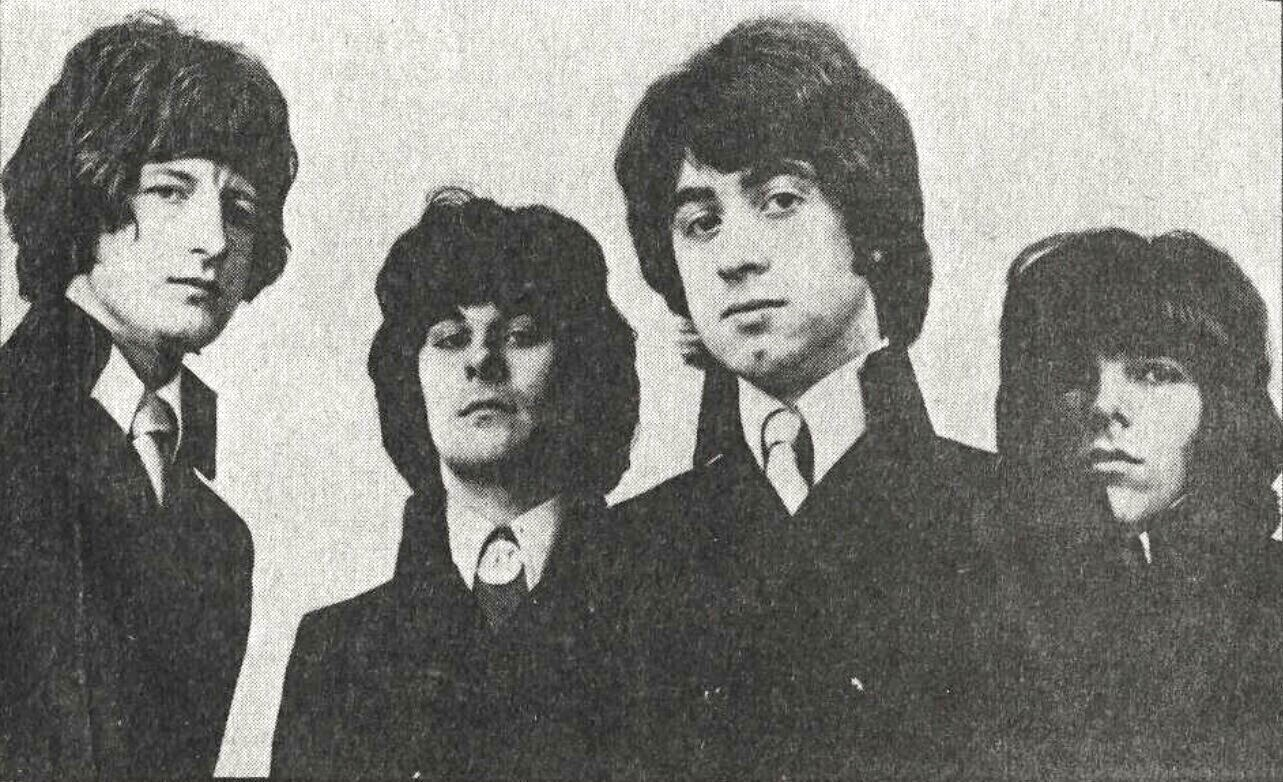
The Iveys c. 1969. From left: Ham, Evans, Griffiths, Gibbins

After receiving an invitation from Collins, Beatles roadie/assistant Mal Evans and Apple Records A&R head Peter Asher saw the Iveys perform at the Marquee Club, London, on 25 January 1968. Evans subsequently pushed their demo tapes to every Beatle until he gained approval from all four to sign the group. The demos were accomplished using a mono "sound-on-sound" tape recorder: two individual tracks bouncing each overdub on top of the last. When Evans signed the Iveys to Apple on 23 July 1968, they became the first non-Beatle recording artists on the label. Each of the Iveys was also signed to Apple Corps publishing contracts. The early Iveys sessions for Apple were produced by either Tony Visconti or Evans.

The group's first single "Maybe Tomorrow", produced by Visconti, was released worldwide on 15 November 1968. It reached the Top 10 in several European countries and Japan, but only No. 67 on the US Billboard Hot 100, and failed to chart in the UK. The US manager of Apple Records, Ken Mansfield, ordered 400,000 copies of the single—considered to be a bold move at the time in the music business—and pushed for automatic airplay and reviews from newspapers, which he secured. Nevertheless, Mansfield remembered the problems: "We had a great group. We had a great record. We were missing just one thing ... the ability to go out and pick up people, and convince them to put their money on the counter." A second Tom Evans composition, "Storm in a Teacup", was included on an Apple EP promoting Wall's Ice Cream, along with songs by Apple artists such as James Taylor, Mary Hopkin, and Jackie Lomax. The chart success of "Maybe Tomorrow" in Europe and Japan led to a follow-up single release in those markets in July 1969: Griffiths's "Dear Angie", also produced by Visconti. An LP containing both singles and titled Maybe Tomorrow was released only in Italy, Germany, and Japan. This limited release strategy was thought to be the work of Apple Corps president Allen Klein: an Apple Corps press officer, Tony Bramwell, remembered: "[Klein] was saying, 'We're not going to issue any more records until I sort out this [Apple Corps] mess.'"

After the unexpectedly limited releases of "Dear Angie" and Maybe Tomorrow, Griffiths complained about Apple's handling of the Iveys in an interview for the Disc & Music Echo magazine, saying: "We do feel a bit neglected. We keep writing songs for a new single and submitting them to Apple, but they keep sending them back, saying they're not good enough." Paul McCartney read the interview and offered the song "Come and Get It" to the group, although he had written the song for the soundtrack of The Magic Christian. Before the recording on Saturday, 2 August 1969, Griffiths remembered the whole group being so excited they couldn't sleep. Producing the track in under one hour, McCartney made sure that they copied his own demo note-for-note: "They were a young band ... they said, 'We want to do it a bit different, wanna get our own thing in'. I said 'No, this has gotta be exactly like this [McCartney's demo], 'cos this is the hit.'"

McCartney had been commissioned to contribute two other songs to the film's soundtrack. After "Come and Get It" was successfully recorded, he offered to produce two of the Iveys' original compositions to fulfil those commissions, for which he selected "Carry On Till Tomorrow" (commissioned as the main title theme for the film) and "Rock of All Ages" (commissioned as background music for a party scene). All three tracks appeared both in the movie and on its soundtrack album. McCartney then recruited George Martin to provide the string arrangement for "Carry On Till Tomorrow". As Griffiths fell ill midway through these sessions, Evans played bass on "Rock of All Ages", "Midnight Sun", and "Crimson Ship".

=== Name change ===
Pending the release of "Come and Get It", the band and Apple agreed that the band's name was too trite for the prevailing music scene, plus the Iveys were sometimes confused with the Ivy League, so a name change was needed. Suggestions were put forward, including the Glass Onion, the Prix, the Cagneys, and Home. Apple Corps' Neil Aspinall proposed "Badfinger", in reference to "Bad Finger Boogie", an early working title of Lennon–McCartney's "With a Little Help from My Friends", as John Lennon had hurt his forefinger on a piano and was using only one finger. In December 1969, the band agreed on Badfinger.

Harrison would later state that the band was named after Helga Fabdinger, a stripper the Beatles had known in Hamburg.

== 1969–1972: Badfinger ==
=== Departure of Griffiths and hiring of Molland ===
At the end of October 1969, Griffiths, who was the sole married occupant of the communal group's home and also was raising a child (b. December 1968), left the group. His responsibilities created friction, mainly between Griffiths' wife, Evans, and manager Collins. Griffiths later said: "Tommy [Evans] created the bad blood. He'd convinced the others that [I was] not one of the boys any more." Drummer Gibbins remembered that he wasn't even consulted about the decision: "I was considered a nothing head at that point. I wasn't even worth conversing with."

As the release date of "Come and Get It" was approaching, the Iveys looked for a replacement for Griffiths. After unsuccessfully auditioning a number of bassists, they hired guitarist Joey Molland, who was previously with Gary Walker & the Rain, the Masterminds, and the Fruit-Eating Bears. His addition required Evans to shift from rhythm guitar to bass.

=== Initial success ===
"Come and Get It" was released as a single in December 1969 in the UK and January 1970 in the US. Selling more than a million copies worldwide, it reached Top 10 throughout the world: No. 7 on the US Billboard chart on 18 April 1970, and No. 4 in the UK. Because the Iveys' Maybe Tomorrow album had been released in only a few markets, the band's three songs from The Magic Christian soundtrack album were combined with other, older Iveys tracks (including both of the Iveys' singles and five other songs from Maybe Tomorrow) and then released as Badfinger's first album Magic Christian Music (1970). The album peaked at No. 55 on the Billboard album chart in the US. In addition, Derek Taylor commissioned Les Smithers to photograph the band in March 1970. His photograph has been acquired by the National Portrait Gallery.

New recording sessions for Badfinger also commenced in March 1970, with Mal Evans producing. Two songs were completed, including "No Matter What", which was rejected by Apple as a potential single. Beatles engineer Geoff Emerick then took over as producer, and the band completed its second album in July 1970. During the recordings, the band were sent to Hawaii on 4 June to appear at a Capitol/Apple Records convention, and they then flew to Italy to play concerts in Rome. No Dice was released in the US in late 1970, peaking at No. 28 on the Billboard album chart. The Mal Evans-produced track "No Matter What", as re-mixed by Emerick, was finally released as a single, and reached numerous Top 10 charts around the world, peaking at No. 8 in the US and No. 5 in the UK. An Emerick-produced album track from No Dice titled "Without You" became even more successful after Harry Nilsson covered the song in 1972; his version became an international hit, reaching No. 1 on Billboard in the US, and also spending five weeks at the top of the UK chart. The song began as a merger of two separate songs, with the verses penned by Ham and the chorus penned by Evans. The song won Ham and Evans the 1972 Ivor Novello award for "Song of the Year".

=== Signing with Stan Polley ===
In April 1970, while in the US scouting prospects for a tour, Collins was introduced to New York businessman Stan Polley, who signed Badfinger to a business management contract in November 1970. Polley established Badfinger Enterprises, Inc., with Stan Poses as vice-president. It bound the band members to various contracts dictating that income from touring, recording, publishing, and even songwriter performance royalties would be directed into holding companies controlled by Polley. It led to a salary arrangement for the band, which various members later complained was inadequate compared to their gross earnings. Gibbins said: "My first impression was, Stan [Polley] is a powerful guy," while Molland thought that Polley seemed more of a father figure. At the same time, Polley was also managing Al Kooper of Blood, Sweat & Tears, and Lou Christie.

Although Polley's professional reputation was admired, his dubious financial practices eventually contributed to the band's downfall. A financial statement prepared by Polley's accountants, Sigmund Balaban & Co., for the period from 8 December 1970 to 31 October 1971, showed Polley's income from the band: "Salaries and advances to client, $8,339 (Joey Molland), $6,861 (Mike Gibbins), $6,211 (Tom Evans), $5,959 (Pete Ham). Net corporation profit, $24,569. Management commission, $75,744 (Stan Polley)". Although it is not known if the band members saw the statement, Collins certainly had, as his handwriting was on the document.

Badfinger toured the US for three months in late 1970 and were generally well received, although the band was already weary of persistent comparisons to the Beatles. "The thing that impressed me so much was how similar their voices were to The Beatles," Tony Visconti (producer, "Maybe Tomorrow") said; "I sometimes had to look over the control board down into the studio to make sure John and Paul weren't singing lead vocals ..." Rolling Stone critic Mike Saunders opined in a rave review of No Dice in 1970: "It's as if John, Paul, George, and Ringo had been reincarnated as Joey, Pete, Tom, and Mike of Badfinger." Media comparisons between them and the Beatles would continue throughout Badfinger's career.

=== Apple session work ===
Various members of Badfinger also participated in sessions for fellow Apple Records labelmates, most notably playing acoustic guitar and percussion on much of Harrison's All Things Must Pass triple album (1970), including the hit singles "Isn't It a Pity", "My Sweet Lord". and "What Is Life". Ham and Evans also provided backing vocals on Ringo Starr's Harrison-produced single, "It Don't Come Easy". Evans and Molland then performed on Lennon's album Imagine (1971), although Molland has said that their tracks were not used. Most famously, on 26 July 1971, all four members of Badfinger arrived at New York's John F. Kennedy International Airport, to rehearse for Harrison's Concert for Bangladesh, which took place on 1 August 1971. Ham duetted on acoustic guitar with Harrison on "Here Comes the Sun" during the concert.

=== Straight Up ===
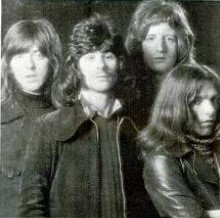
The band on the Straight Up album cover (l-r: Molland, Evans, Ham, Gibbins)

In 1971, the group rented Clearwell Castle in Gloucestershire, living and recording there. They finished recording their third album, again with Emerick as a producer, but the tapes were once again rejected by Apple because Apple felt that Badfinger needed a producer who could bring a more polished sound to the recordings. Thus, George Harrison himself took over as producer in spring of 1971, including Leon Russell and Klaus Voormann in the sessions as well. Commenting on the recording of the dual slide guitars on "Day After Day", Molland remembered: "Pete and I had done the backing track, and George came in the studio and asked if we'd mind if he played ... It took hours, and hours, and hours, to get those two guitars in sync". However, Harrison stopped the sessions after recording just four songs because of his commitments to The Concert for Bangladesh, in which Harrison included Badfinger as well. After the concert, Harrison was tied up with producing the tapes from that concert, and so was unable to resume with Badfinger. Instead, the Badfinger album was completed by Todd Rundgren, who mixed the tapes from the Harrison sessions, re-recorded the songs from the Emerick sessions, and also produced some newer, previously unrecorded songs.

The album, ultimately titled Straight Up, was released in the US in December 1971 and spawned two successful singles: "Day After Day" (Billboard No. 4), which sold over a million worldwide, and "Baby Blue" (US No. 14). The album reached No. 31 on the US charts. However, the disintegration of Apple Records in Britain led to "Baby Blue" never being released as a UK single, although a release number and date had already been assigned to it.

The band embarked on a US tour in 1972, but after problems with Evans, Gibbins left and was replaced for the tour by drummer Rob Stawinsky, who was described as Badfinger's "solid, new drummer". Stawinsky was not used after the tour, though, and Gibbins rejoined the band in September.

== 1972–1984: Decline and struggles ==
=== End of Apple ===
At the start of 1972, Badfinger were contracted for one last album with Apple Records. Despite Badfinger's success, Apple was facing troubled times, and its operations were being cut back by Klein. According to Molland, Polley told the band that Klein wanted to cut Badfinger's royalty rate and make them pay for their own studio time. By this time, manager Polley was openly suspected of financial mismanagement by his other clients, Christie and music arranger Charlie Calello. A series of allegations also represented Polley as a one-time "bagman" for the Mafia.

Sessions for Badfinger's fourth and final album for Apple, Ass, had begun as far back as early 1972 and would continue at five recording studios over the next year. Rundgren was originally hired to produce but quit in a financial dispute during the first week. The band then produced itself, but Apple rejected their version of the album. Finally, Badfinger hired Chris Thomas to co-produce and complete the project. Meanwhile, Polley negotiated a deal with Warner Bros. Records that required a new album from the band every six months over a three-year period. By this time Evans had become suspicious of Polley's oversight, but the band nevertheless signed the deal. Released in 1973, the Ass front cover featured Evans' idea: a jackass staring at a huge dangling carrot. The Ass release was further stalled because of legal wrangling, with Polley using Molland's unsigned song publishing as a negotiating ploy. Attempting to sweep discrepancies under the carpet to secure the LP's release, Apple attributed the songwriting credits to "Badfinger". But both Ass (US number 122), and its accompanying lead single, "Apple of My Eye", fell short of reaching the Billboard Hot 100.

=== Move to Warner Bros. Records ===
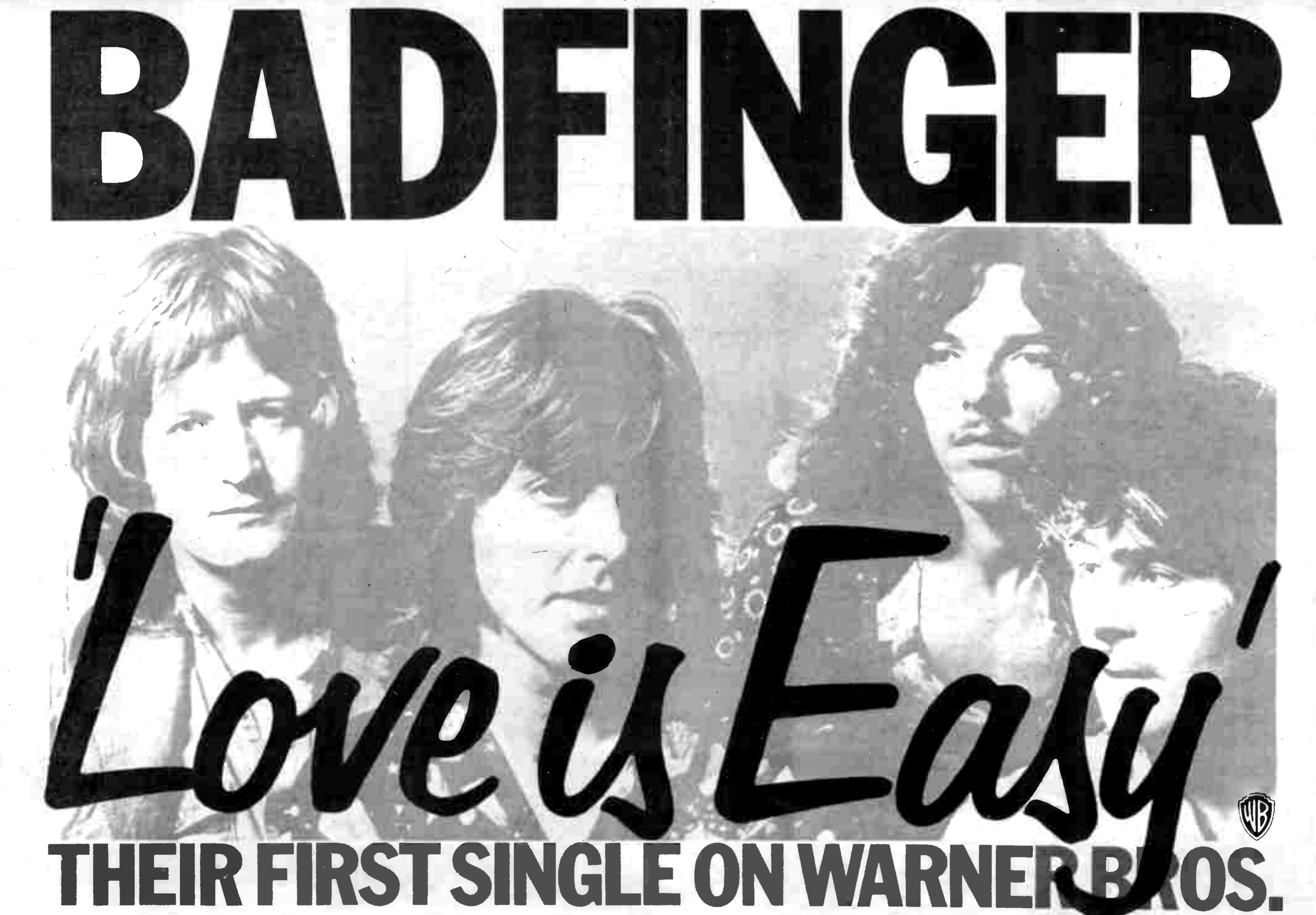
Warner Bros. Records' trade advertisement for the "Love Is Easy" single

After the Apple contract had been fulfilled, Polley signed the band to a management contract demanding two albums a year. Poses, as vice-president of Badfinger Enterprises Inc., repeatedly told the band not to sign the contract. Polley organised a $3 million recording contract with Warner Bros., telling the band, "You're all millionaires!" The deal gave the band 12% of retail in the US—the price Warner Brothers received from record outlets—and 8.5% for the rest of the world, with a $225,000 advance for every album delivered.

Only six weeks after the Ass sessions had been completed, Badfinger re-entered the studio to begin recording material for its first Warner Bros. release, Badfinger (the intended title, For Love or Money, was omitted from the album pressings). The album was produced by Thomas, even though the songs were being written in the studio as they recorded. Ass and Badfinger were released almost simultaneously, and the accompanying singles from Badfinger, "Love Is Easy" (UK) and "I Miss You" (US), were unsuccessful. Badfinger did manage to retain some US fan support as a result of their touring schedule. A March 1974 concert at the Cleveland Agora was recorded on 16-track tape for a possible live album release, even though the performance was deemed unsatisfactory at the time.

Following the American tours, Badfinger recorded Wish You Were Here at the Caribou Ranch recording studio in Colorado, and at George Martin's AIR Studios in London. The album was well received by Rolling Stone and other periodicals upon its release in October 1974. However, over the previous year, Warner Brothers' publishing arm had become increasingly troubled by a lack of communication from Polley regarding the status of an escrow account of advance funds. Per their contract, Polley was to deposit $250,000 into a mutually accessible account for safekeeping, which both Warner Publishing and the band could potentially access. But Polley did not reveal the account's whereabouts to Warner Publishing, and he reportedly ignored Warner's demands to do so. As a result, in a letter dated 30 April 1974, WB's publishing arm terminated its relationship with Badfinger, but, other than having the group sign some new contracts, Polley took no action to resolve Warner's publishing issue. Consistent with the termination notice, on 14 August 1974, Warner's publishing arm refused to accept the tapes of Wish You Were Here, but the album was later released anyway.

=== Turmoil and personnel changes ===
Crises in band management, money, and band leadership were creating growing frictions within Badfinger. Molland's wife, Kathie, had been taking a more assertive role in the band's politics, which did not endear her to the rest of the band, particularly Ham. She remembered complaining that even though the band had hit records, they "still didn't have a fridge, and didn't have a TV". However, one of the band's assistants said, "Kathie was a wishful Linda McCartney. If she had her way, she would have ended up part of the band." Just before the start of rehearsals for an October 1974 UK tour, Ham suddenly quit Badfinger during a management meeting, standing up and shouting "I don't want Kathie managing the band! I'm leaving". He found a cottage in Wales, where he hoped to build a studio. He was quickly replaced by guitarist/keyboardist Bob Jackson, who was then idle after previous involvement with the Fortunes. During Ham's three-week hiatus from the band, Polley tried to interest record companies in Ham as a solo act, but under pressure from Warner Brothers, Ham rejoined the band in time for the tour, as the company made it clear that it would have little to no interest in promoting Badfinger if Ham was not a part of it. Jackson remained as full-time keyboardist, making the band a quintet. After the UK tour, Molland quit of his own accord to pursue a solo career in December 1974.

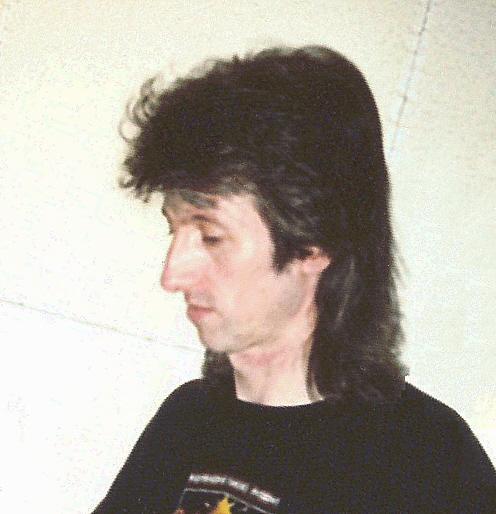
Guitarist/keyboardist Bob Jackson in 1990

With the Warner situation becoming increasingly unstable, Polley's next ploy was to press the band to pass up a US tour to go back into Apple Recording Studios to record its third album under the Warner Brothers contract. Because Thomas, the producer of Badfinger's last three albums, thought that the band was rushing into the studio too quickly, Polley hired Kiss producers Kenny Kerner and Richie Wise to produce the album. Over only 11 days at the Apple studios, tracks were recorded for the Head First album (eventually released in 2000), and rough mixes were distributed to the musicians and Warner Brothers Records in America. However, because Warner's publishing arm had already filed a lawsuit against Polley and Badfinger in the L.A. Superior Court on 10 December 1974, the album tapes could not be formally accepted by Warner Bros. – and Warner executives also thought the rough tapes sounded "thrown together in a hurry" in "an obvious attempt [to] extract further advances from us". The legal action also led to the company stopping the promotion of Wish You Were Here after seven weeks, and ending its distribution worldwide, thus completely halting Badfinger's career.

=== Ham's suicide and break-up ===
With their current album suddenly withdrawn and their follow-up rejected, Badfinger spent the early months of 1975 trying to figure out how to proceed under the unclear legal situation. Their March 1975 salary cheques did not clear, and the April cheques never arrived. Panic set in, especially for Ham, who had recently bought a £30,000 house in Woking, Surrey, and whose girlfriend was expecting a child. According to Jackson, the band tried to continue without Polley's involvement by contacting booking agents and prospective managers throughout London, but they were routinely declined because of their restrictive contracts with Polley and impending legal actions. Ham reportedly tried on many occasions to contact Polley by telephone during the early months of 1975, but was never able to reach him.

On the night of 23 April 1975, Ham received a phone call from the United States, telling him that all his money had disappeared. Later that night he met Tom Evans and they went to The White Hart Pub in Surrey together, where Ham drank ten whiskies. Evans drove him home at three o'clock on the morning of 24 April 1975. Ham hanged himself in his garage studio in Woking later that morning. His suicide note—addressed to his girlfriend, Anne Herriot, and her son, Blair—blamed Polley for much of his despair and inability to cope with his disappointments in life. The note read: "Anne, I love you. Blair, I love you. I will not be allowed to love and trust everybody. This is better. Pete. P.S. Stan Polley is a soulless bastard. I will take him with me". Ham died at the age of 27. He had shown growing signs of mental illness over the past months, with Gibbins remembering Ham burning cigarettes on his hands and arms. He was cremated at the Morriston Crematorium, Swansea; his ashes were spread in the memorial gardens. Ham's daughter, Petera, was born one month after his death. In May, Warner Bros terminated its contract with Badfinger, and Badfinger dissolved. Around that time, Apple also deleted all of Badfinger's albums from its catalogue.

=== Post-Badfinger ===
Gibbins joined the Flying Aces and performed session drumming for various Welsh acts, including Bonnie Tyler's international hit "It's a Heartache". Evans and Jackson became part of a group called the Dodgers. They released three British singles on Island Records in 1976. "Don't Let Me Be Wrong" was the act's only US release, but it failed to chart. Subsequently, the management of the Dodgers fired Evans in 1977 for insubordination and deleted all his performances from the group's subsequent album recordings (later released as Love on the Rebound). The group finally broke up in 1978, after which Jackson joined the Searchers and the David Byron Band. Molland started a band in 1975 with Colosseum's Mark Clarke and Humble Pie's Jerry Shirley using the moniker Natural Gas. They performed a few concerts as the opening act for Peter Frampton in 1976. Natural Gas released a self-titled album and three singles, but none managed to chart.

By 1977, both Molland and Evans were out of the music business. Molland later described his dire economic circumstances: "Thank God I had guitars and I was able to sell some of that stuff. We were flat broke, and that's happened to me three times, where my wife and I have had to sell off everything and go and stay with her parents or do whatever. I installed carpeting for a while in Los Angeles and stuff like that. You do what you've got to do to survive." In London, Evans briefly had jobs insulating pipes, and driving a taxi. Collins was having trouble paying the lease on the group's two-room rehearsal studio at No. 6 Denmark Street, London. After advertising for new occupants, he was contacted by Malcolm McLaren, manager of the Sex Pistols, who gave Collins £650 (equivalent to £5,000 in 2025) and a Fender Rhodes piano as down payment.

=== A reunion, another break-up, and Evans' suicide ===
Later in 1977, United States–based drummer Kenny Harck and guitarist Joe Tansin recruited Molland to start a new band. When they needed a bass player, Molland suggested Evans, who joined after a visit to California in 1978. Encouragement from the Elektra record company led to the decision to rename the new band Badfinger. Their "comeback" album, Airwaves, was released in 1979. Harck was fired from the band during the sessions and Tansin left the band immediately after the album was completed. To promote the album, Molland and Evans recruited Tony Kaye (ex-Yes) on keyboards and Peter Clarke on drums from Stealers Wheel. The single "Love is Gonna Come at Last" from Airwaves reached No. 69 on the Billboard chart. With Glenn Sherba added on second guitar and Richard Bryans (from the band Aviary) replacing Clarke on drums, Badfinger released their second post-Ham album Say No More in 1981, with the album being distributed by Radio Records. The second single, "Hold On", reached No. 56 on the Billboard charts.

The Warner Brothers lawsuit against Polley lasted four years, with Polley finally being forced to pay a "substantial sum" back to the company in late 1978. However, Polley managed to retain approximately half of the original $100,000 escrow payment, representing about three albums' worth of payments. In 1987, detective John Hansen, working for the Riverside District Attorney's office, started an investigation into fraudulent bank dealings by Polley.

After the failure of Say No More, Molland and Evans operated rival touring bands, each using the name "Badfinger" during 1982 and 1983, which created even more personal and professional conflict. In 1982, Evans teamed with pre-1975 Badfinger members Jackson and Gibbins, first adding guitarist Adam Allen and then, in the fall of 1982, adding guitarists Reed Kailing of the Grass Roots and (Chicago's) Donnie Dacus.

In 1983 Evans and Jackson were joined by post-1975 Badfinger members Kaye and Sherba with drummer Lenny Campanaro. Meanwhile, for his Badfinger concerts, Molland had teamed with post-1975 member Tansin. Evans and Jackson signed a management contract with Milwaukee businessman John Cass, leading to a disastrous tour and a $5 million lawsuit, which was finally settled on 21 October 1985 in Cass's favour, although both musicians argued that their responsibilities of the contract could not be enforced because certain management obligations had not been performed. Early in 1983, Evans and Jackson, with assistance from new member Al Wodtke, completed four demos in Minneapolis, under the name "Badfinger". The demos included Jackson's "I Won't Forget You", a tribute to Ham. The songs were briefly promoted but failed to generate strong interest, despite the involvement of Don Powell, who was a manager for musicians such as David Bowie and Stevie Wonder.

On the night of 18 November 1983, Evans and Molland had an extensive and heated argument on the telephone regarding past Badfinger income still in escrow from the Apple era, and the "Without You" songwriting royalties Evans was now receiving, which Molland, former manager Collins and Gibbins, all wanted a share of. Following this argument, 36-year-old Evans hanged himself in the garden at his home in New Haw, Surrey, on the morning of 19 November 1983. He was cremated at the Woking Crematorium, Surrey, on 25 November 1983.

== Since 1984 ==
In 1984, Molland, Gibbins, and Jackson reunited as Badfinger, along with Al Wodtke and Randy Anderson, playing 31 dates as part of a "20th Anniversary of the British Rock 'N' Roll Tour", which included Gerry and the Pacemakers, the Troggs, Billy J. Kramer and Herman's Hermits. In 1986, Molland and Gibbins resumed sporadic touring as Badfinger, with Randy Anderson on guitar and either Mark Healey or A. J. Nicholas on bass. Gibbins left for good in February 1990 following appearances at three auto shows in Columbus, Ohio, West Allis, Wisconsin, and Flint, Michigan.

All four Badfinger albums on Apple, which were deleted from release in 1975, have been reissued twice; first in the early 1990s as part of a revival of the Apple catalogue and again in 2010, when the albums were available individually or as part of the 17-disc Apple Box Set. The sole Iveys' album Maybe Tomorrow was also reissued in the early 1990s but was not part of the 2010 campaign.

Badfinger's first collection titled Shine On, spanning their two Warner Brothers albums, was released in the UK in 1989. In 1990, Rhino Records released another Warner Brothers-era compilation, The Best of Badfinger, Vol. 2, including material from both Airwaves and the previously unreleased Head First. A greatest hits collection taken from Badfinger's four albums on Apple, Come and Get It: The Best of Badfinger, appeared in 1995 on the EMI/Apple/Capitol label, which was the band's first release since 1973's Ass to be assigned a standard Apple catalogue number: SAPCOR 28. A more comprehensive collection, with tracks from both record labels, was the 2000s The Very Best of Badfinger. In 2013, a new compilation titled Timeless was issued by EMI/Universal both to capitalize on the use of "Baby Blue" in the finale of Breaking Bad and to include the 2010 remastered versions of Badfinger's songs on a greatest-hits album.

In 1990, Rykodisc released Day After Day: Live, billed as a Badfinger live recording from 1974. The album underwent substantial re-recording, and a rearranged track order by the album's producer, Molland, and had a mixed critical reaction. The album's release then sparked a lawsuit filed by Molland. The band's accounting firm, collecting for a 1985 court order settlement, had re-adjusted against Molland's Apple royalty income by deducting away the percentage amounts of that court order, then reimbursing those amounts to the other Badfinger parties. The Rykodisc contract did not include artist royalty payments, because Molland had advised Rykodisc he would take care of that distribution himself under another company name. Molland subsequently sued the other members and their estates to recoup his expenses plus a producer's royalty. He was awarded a partial settlement, as the judge stated the evidence against Molland was insufficient to justify a severe penalty, also noting that since both parties had conceded the original tapes were of poor quality, Molland's salvaging of them to a commercial level merited consideration.

After the success of Mariah Carey's recording of "Without You" in 1994, Molland and Gibbins collected an award from the American Society of Composers, Authors and Publishers (ASCAP) in 1995, incurring the anger of the Ham and Evans families.

In a 1988 readers poll for Goldmine magazine, Straight Up (1971) ranked as the most-requested CD release among out-of-print albums, but the album made it to CD only in 1993. In 1995, Molland was paid to re-record the 10 most popular Badfinger songs. These recordings were variously packaged in the market, often showing the original 1970s line-up of the band with little or no disclaiming information, despite Molland being the only original member of Badfinger who performed. A detailed biography of Badfinger by Dan Matovina was published in 1998, titled Without You: The Tragic Story of Badfinger. The 2000 update of the book was accompanied by a CD of rare material and interviews.

In 2000, a rough mix version of Head First (taken from an open-reel tape prepared by Apple engineer Phil McDonald in December 1974) was released on CD. (According to Dan Matovina, Warner Brothers could not locate the original master tapes for remixing at that time, but they were eventually found about 10 years later.) In 2002, Gibbins released a two-disc set of a Badfinger performance recorded in Indiana on 19 October 1982 that had been captured on a basic cassette recorder, which was initially (and inaccurately) titled Live 83 – DBA-BFR. The band at that time had consisted of Evans, Gibbins, Jackson, Kailing, and Dacus.

In 2003 and again in 2006, two separate CDs of related Apple Publishing music, 94 Baker Street and An Apple a Day, were released. The CDs contain nine songs by the Iveys. In 2008, another CD of Apple-related songs, Treacle Toffee World: Further Adventures into the Pop Psych Sounds from the Apple Era 1967–1969, included two more Iveys demos.

By 2013, the issue of royalty payments had been resolved in court. The main songwriter receives 32 percent of publishing royalties and 25 percent of ASCAP royalties. The other band members and Collins share the rest. Revenue from album sales is shared equally with 20 percent going to each member as well as Collins. In 1994, the year in which Mariah Carey covered the song "Without You", the royalties for Ham's estate spiked up to US$500,000.

== Post-Badfinger solo activities ==
Following the demise of Badfinger, each of the three living former members (Joey Molland, Bob Jackson, and Mike Gibbins) continued to record and play new music. Molland has released five solo albums, After the Pearl (1983), The Pilgrim (1992), This Way Up (2001), Return to Memphis (2013), and Be True to Yourself (2020). In 1998 he released a collection of demos called Demos Old and New on his own label, Independent Artists. In 1995, Jackson re-joined the Fortunes, where he sang lead, and they consistently performed Badfinger songs in their set. In 1996, Gibbins contributed two songs to the compilation album Young Savage Florida (1996). He later released four solo albums through Exile Music: A Place in Time in 1998, More Annoying Songs (featuring ex-Iveys member Griffiths singing on 2 tracks) in 2002, Archeology (Griffiths on 1 track) in 2005, and In the Meantime, also in 2005. The latter included different re-recordings of both the Badfinger hit "Come and Get It" and Gibbins's "In the Meantime", originally from the Wish You Were Here album in 1974.

Also, posthumous collections were released for both Pete Ham and Tom Evans. In both 1997 and 1999, two collections of Ham's home recordings were released: 7 Park Avenue (1997) and Golders Green (1999) with extra instruments added by Jackson and Griffiths. In 1995, a posthumous Evans album was released, Over You: The Final Tracks, which was produced by Evans's friend and songwriting partner Rod Roach.

Former manager Bill Collins died in August 2002 at age 89, and on 4 October 2005, Mike Gibbins died in his sleep at his home in Oviedo, Florida, from a brain aneurysm. He was 56, had been married twice, and had three sons.

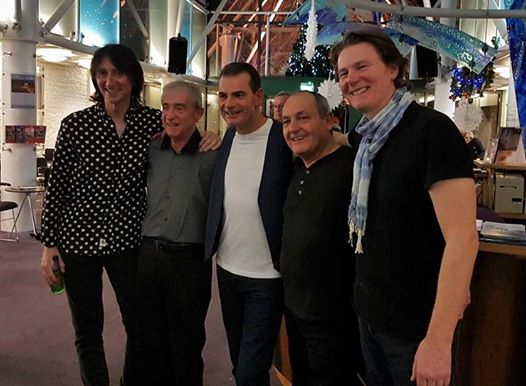
Badfinger's Bob Jackson in 2016 with former Iveys bassist Ron Griffiths

In June 2006, a Badfinger convention took place in Swansea, featuring a performance by Bob Jackson. The event brought together Jackson, Ron Griffiths, and some members of the Ham, Evans, and Gibbins families. On 1 January 2008, BBC Wales broadcast a one-hour documentary about Badfinger.

On 27 April 2013, an official blue plaque was unveiled by the Swansea City Council to honour Pete Ham in his home town of Swansea. The public event was also attended by two former members of the original Badfinger band, the Iveys, Ron Griffiths and Dai Jenkins, plus former Badfinger member, Bob Jackson. The plaque honored Pete and all the Iveys and Badfinger members of Pete Ham's lifetime. A concert followed the unveiling of the plaque featuring former Badfinger members Bob Jackson and Al Wodtke.

Joey Molland's wife, Kathie Molland, died on 24 March 2009, and Stan Polley died on 20 July 2009 in California.

Molland, the last surviving member of the band's classic lineup, continued to tour under the name Joey Molland's Badfinger in the United States. In 2015, former member Bob Jackson formed his own version of Badfinger with current members Andy Nixon, Michael Healey, and Ted Duggan to honour the memory of Pete Ham, Tom Evans, and Mike Gibbins and undertook a 23 date UK theatre tour, playing to more than 20,000 people. In 2016, the band again played UK shows. Molland continued to lead his Badfinger touring group until 2024; he died the following year, on 1 March 2025, aged 77.

== Members ==
Classic line-up

- Pete Ham – vocals, guitar, keyboards (1961–1975; his death)
- Mike Gibbins – drums, percussion, vocals, keyboards (1965–1975, 1982–1984; died 2005)
- Tom Evans – vocals, bass, guitar (1967–1975, 1978–1983; his death)
- Joey Molland – vocals, guitar, keyboards (1969–1974, 1978–1984; died 2025)

Other members

- David Jenkins – guitar, vocals (1961–1967)
- Ron Griffiths – bass, vocals (1961–1969)
- Bob Jackson – keyboards, guitar, vocals (1974–1975, 1984)
- Joe Tansin – guitar, vocals (1978)
- Kenny Harck – drums (1978)
- Bob Schell – guitar (1979)
- Tony Kaye – keyboards, organ, piano (1979–1981)
- Peter Clarke – drums (1979)
- Ian Wallace – drums (1979–1980; died 2007)
- Rod Roach – guitar (1980)
- Richard Bryans – drums (1980–1981)
- Glen Sherba – guitar (1980–1981)
- Randy Anderson – guitar, vocals (1984)
- Al Wodtke – bass, vocals (1984)

Line-ups

| 1961–1965 The Iveys | Pete Ham – vocals, lead guitar, keyboards; David Jenkins – vocals, rhythm guitar; Ron Griffiths – vocals, bass; Roy Anderson – drums |
| 1965–1967 The Iveys | Pete Ham – vocals, lead guitar, keyboards; David Jenkins – vocals, rhythm guitar; Ron Griffiths – vocals, bass; Mike Gibbins – vocals, drums, percussion |
| 1967–1969 The Iveys | Pete Ham – vocals, lead guitar, keyboards; Tom Evans – vocals, rhythm guitar; Ron Griffiths – vocals, bass; Mike Gibbins – vocals, drums, percussion |
| 1969–1974 Badfinger | Pete Ham – vocals, lead and rhythm guitar, keyboards; Joey Molland – vocals, rhythm and lead guitar, keyboards; Tom Evans – vocals, bass, acoustic guitar; Mike Gibbins – vocals, drums, percussion, keyboards; Additional personnel: Rob Stawinsky – drums (US tour, 1972) |
| October – November 1974 | Pete Ham – vocals, lead guitar, keyboards; Joey Molland – vocals, rhythm and lead guitar, keyboards; Bob Jackson – vocals, keyboards, rhythm guitar; Tom Evans – vocals, bass, acoustic guitar; Mike Gibbins – vocals, drums, percussion, keyboards |
| November 1974 – April 1975 | Pete Ham – vocals, lead guitar, keyboards; Bob Jackson – vocals, keyboards, rhythm guitar; Tom Evans – vocals, bass, acoustic guitar; Mike Gibbins – vocals, drums, percussion, keyboards |
| May 1975 – 1978 | Disbanded |
| 1978 | Joey Molland – vocals, guitar, keyboards; Joe Tansin – vocals, guitar; Tom Evans – vocals, bass, guitar; Kenny Harck – drums |
| 1978 | Joey Molland – vocals, guitar, keyboards; Joe Tansin – vocals, guitar, keyboards; Tom Evans – vocals, bass, guitar |
| 1979 | Joey Molland – vocals, guitar, keyboards; Bob Schell – guitar; Tony Kaye – keyboards; Tom Evans – vocals, bass, guitar; Peter Clarke – drums |
| 1979 | Joey Molland – vocals, guitar, keyboards; Tony Kaye – keyboards; Tom Evans – vocals, bass, guitar; Peter Clarke – drums |
| 1979–1980 | Joey Molland – vocals, guitar, keyboards; Tony Kaye – keyboards; Tom Evans – vocals, bass, guitar; Ian Wallace – drums |
| 1980 | Joey Molland – vocals, guitar, keyboards; Rod Roach – guitar; Tony Kaye – keyboards; Tom Evans – vocals, bass, guitar; Richard Bryans – drums |
| 1980–1981 | Joey Molland – vocals, guitar, piano; Glen Sherba – guitar; Tony Kaye – keyboards; Tom Evans – vocals, bass, guitar; Richard Bryans – drums |
| 1982–1983 | Two variations of Badfinger in existence. |
| 1984 | Joey Molland – vocals, guitar; Randy Anderson – vocals, guitar; Bob Jackson – vocals, guitar, keyboards; Al Wodtke – vocals, bass; Mike Gibbins – vocals, drums, percussion, keyboards |

Molland's Badfinger

| 1981 | Joey Molland – vocals, guitar, keyboards; Joe Tansin – vocals, guitar; Larry Lee – vocals, bass; Bobby Wickland – drums |
| 1982 | Joey Molland – vocals, guitar, keyboards; Ted Turner – vocals, guitar; Craig Howlett – bass; Bobby Wickland – drums |
| 1983 | Joey Molland – vocals, guitar, keyboards; Adrian Russell AKA Russell DeFlavia – keyboards; Rick Reid – bass; Steve Craiter – drums |
| 1984–2024 | Joey Molland – vocals, guitar; Mark Healey – bass, vocals (1986–2024); Steve Wozny – keyboards, vocals (2001–2024); Mike Ricciardi – drums (2010–2024); varying line-ups since 1984 |

Evans & Gibbins's Badfinger

| 1982 | Bob Jackson – vocals, keyboards, guitar; Jimmy McCullogh – guitar; Steve Johns – keyboards; Tom Evans – vocals, bass, guitar; Mike Gibbins – vocals, drums |
| 1982 | Bob Jackson – vocals, keyboards, guitar; Fred Girard – guitar, vocals; Tom Evans – vocals, bass, guitar; Mike Gibbins – vocals, drums |
| 1982 | Bob Jackson – vocals, keyboards, guitar; Adam Allen – guitar, backing vocals; Tom Evans – vocals, bass, guitar; Mike Gibbins – vocals, drums, percussion, keyboards |
| 1982 | Bob Jackson – vocals, keyboards, guitar; Reed Kailing – vocals, guitar; Donnie Dacus – vocals, guitar; Tom Evans – vocals, bass, guitar; Mike Gibbins – vocals, drums, percussion, keyboards |
| 1983 | Bob Jackson – vocals, guitar, keyboards; Glen Sherba – guitar; Tony Kaye – electric piano, organ; Tom Evans – vocals, bass; Lenny Campanero – drums |

Bob Jackson's Badfinger

| 2015–present | Bob Jackson – vocals, guitar, keyboards; Andy Nixon – vocals, guitar; Anthony Harty – vocals, bass; Ted Duggan – drums |

== Discography ==
=== Studio albums ===
As the Iveys:

| Year | Album |
|---|---|
| 1969 | Maybe Tomorrow |

As Badfinger:

| Year | Album | AUS | US |
|---|---|---|---|
| 1970 | Magic Christian Music | 31 | 55 |
| 1970 | No Dice | — | 28 |
| 1971 | Straight Up | 22 | 31 |
| 1973 | Ass | — | 122 |
| 1974 | Badfinger | — | 161 |
| 1974 | Wish You Were Here | — | 148 |
| 1979 | Airwaves | 97 | 125 |
| 1981 | Say No More | — | 155 |
| 2000 | Head First | — | — |

=== Compilations/live albums ===
| Year | Title |
|---|---|
| 1989 | Shine On (UK only) |
| 1990 | The Best of Badfinger, Vol. 2 |
| 1990 | Day After Day: Live |
| 1995 | Come and Get It: The Best of Badfinger |
| 1997 | BBC in Concert 1972–1973 |
| 2000 | The Very Best of Badfinger |
| 2002 | Live 83 – DBA-BFR |
| 2010 | Magic Christian Music; No Dice; Straight Up; Ass (remastered albums on CD, with bonus tracks) |
| 2010 | Apple Records Extra: Badfinger |
| 2013 | Timeless...The Musical Legacy |

=== Singles ===
| Year | Song | UK | AUS | CAN | US Hot 100 | US CB Top 100 | Album |
|---|---|---|---|---|---|---|---|
| 1968 | "Maybe Tomorrow" (as the Iveys) | — | — | — | 67 | 51 | Maybe Tomorrow |
| 1969 | "Dear Angie" (as the Iveys) | — | — | — | — | — | Maybe Tomorrow |
| 1969 | "Come and Get It" | 4 | 14 | 4 | 7 | 6 | Magic Christian Music |
| 1970 | "No Matter What" | 5 | 8 | 7 | 8 | 6 | No Dice |
| 1971 | "Day After Day" | 10 | 6 | 2 | 4 | 3 | Straight Up |
| 1972 | "Baby Blue" | 73 | 16 | 7 | 14 | 9 | Straight Up |
| 1973 | "Apple of My Eye" | — | 96 | — | 102 | 88 | Ass |
| 1974 | "Love Is Easy" | — | — | — | — | — | Badfinger |
| 1974 | "I Miss You" | — | — | — | — | — | Badfinger |
| 1979 | "Lost Inside Your Love" | — | — | — | — | — | Airwaves |
| 1979 | "Love Is Gonna Come at Last" | — | — | — | 69 | 79 | Airwaves |
| 1981 | "Hold On" | — | — | — | 56 | 67 | Say No More |
| 1981 | "I Got You" | — | — | — | — | — | Say No More |
| 1981 | "Because I Love You" | — | — | — | — | — | Say No More |

== Sources ==
- Ashton, Robert (2003). Waking up in London. Sanctuary Publishing. ISBN 978-1-86074-491-4.
- Badfinger (AC-3, Colour, DVD-Video, Special Edition, NTSC). Katz, Gary J. US and Canada: Geneon Universal Entertainment. 1997. 6304676999.
- Badman, Keith (2001). The Beatles Diary Volume 2: After The Break-Up 1970–2001. Omnibus Press. ISBN 0-7119-7520-5.
- Beatlefan (1990). Beatlefan: v. 1 & 2: The Authoritative Publication of Record for Fans of the "Beatles": Vols 1&2. Pierian Press. ISBN 978-0-87650-199-3.
- Blake, John (1981). All You Needed Was Love: The Beatles After The Beatles. Perigee Books. ISBN 978-0-399-50556-0.
- Buckley, Peter (2003). The Rough Guide to Rock. Rough Guides. ISBN 978-1-84353-105-0.
- Crouse, Richard (2000). Big Bang, Baby: Rock Trivia. Hounslow Press. ISBN 978-0-88882-219-2.
- DiLello, Richard (2000). The Longest Cocktail Party: An Insider's Diary of the Beatles, Their Million-dollar Apple Empire and Its Wild Rise and Fall. Playboy Press. ISBN 978-1-84195-089-1.
- Ingham, Chris (2003). The rough guide to the Beatles. Rough Guides. ISBN 978-1-84353-140-1.
- Jones, David (2001). The Beatles and Wales: The Long and Winding Road. St. David's Press. ISBN 978-1-902719-09-2.
- Howard, David N. (2004). Sonic alchemy: visionary music producers and their maverick recordings. Hal Leonard Publishing Corporation. ISBN 978-0-634-05560-7.
- Klosterman, Chuck (2005). Killing Yourself to Live: 85% of a True Story. Scribner Book Company. ISBN 978-0-7432-6445-7.
- Larkin, Colin (2002). The Virgin Encyclopedia of 70s Music. Virgin Books. ISBN 978-1-85227-947-9.
- Leng, Simon (2006). While my guitar gently weeps: the music of George Harrison. Hal Leonard Publishing Corporation. ISBN 978-1-4234-0609-9.
- Lewisohn, Mark (1988). The Beatles' Recording Sessions. Crown Publications. p. 182. ISBN 978-0-517-57066-1.
- Mansfield, Ken (2007). The White Book: The Beatles, the Bands, the Biz: An Insider's Look at an Era. Nelson Current. ISBN 978-1-59555-101-6.
- Matovina, Dan (2000). Without You: The Tragic Story of "Badfinger". Frances Glover Books. ISBN 978-0-9657122-2-4.
- Miles, Barry (1997). Many Years from Now. Vintage-Random House. ISBN 978-0-7493-8658-0.
- Murrells, Joseph (1984). Million Selling Records from the 1900s to the 1980s. Batsford Ltd. ISBN 978-0-7134-3843-7.
- O'Dell, Denis; Neaverson, Bob (2002). At the Apple's Core: The Beatles from the Inside: Life with the "Beatles", 1964–70. Peter Owen Ltd. ISBN 978-0-7206-1116-8.
- Rees, Dafydd; Crampton, Luke (1991). Rock movers & shakers. ABC-Clio Inc. ISBN 978-0-87436-661-7.
- Scheim, David E. (1988). Contract on America: the Mafia murder of President John F. Kennedy. SPI Books. ISBN 978-0-933503-30-4.
- Segalstad, Eric; Hunter, Josh (2009). The 27s: The Greatest Myth of Rock & Roll. North Atlantic Books. ISBN 978-0-615-18964-2.
- Shea, Stuart (2002). Rock and Roll's Most Wanted. Brassey's US. ISBN 978-1-57488-477-7.
- Simmonds, Jeremy (2008). The Encyclopedia of Dead Rock Stars: Heroin, Handguns, and Ham Sandwiches. Chicago Review Press. ISBN 978-1-55652-754-8.
- Talevski, Nick (1999). The Encyclopedia of Rock Obituaries. Omnibus Press. ISBN 978-0-7119-7548-4.
- Valentine, Jack (2006). Motley Rock Stories. Xulon Press. ISBN 978-1-60034-774-0.
