= Stan Polley =

US entertainment manager and convicted fraudster (1922–2009)

- Born: April 7, 1922; New York City, U.S.
- Died: July 20, 2009 (aged 87); Rancho Mirage, California, U.S.
- Occupation: Entertainment manager

Stanley Herbert Polley (April 7, 1922 – July 20, 2009) was an American entertainment manager active in the 1960s and 1970s. His clients included rock band Badfinger, musician Al Kooper, and singer Lou Christie. Throughout his career, Polley defrauded a number of clients and associates, most notably Badfinger. Despite his fraud being widely reported, and the suicides of two of his victims, Polley was not convicted of anything until 1991, receiving no prison time and merely a period of probation, along with an order for restitution that he never paid.

== Early life ==
Polley was born on April 7, 1922 in New York City to Abraham “Abe” Polley/Polowitz and Julia Lippman Polley. After serving as a corporal in the U.S. Army during World War II, he practiced law and worked in retail shops before beginning his managerial career in New York's garment industry.

== Entertainment manager ==
Polley began artist management after he met Lou Christie in the mid-1960s. It was through his association with Christie that he met and began working with other artists in the New York and Los Angeles entertainment fields.

In 1968, Polley formed a company called Five Arts Management, for his work with singer Lou Christie, musician Al Kooper, arranger Charles Calello, TV director Michael Cooper, composer Sandy Linzer and WABC disc jockey Bob Lewis. He formed further companies for legal and accounting purposes to manage artists including composers Irwin Levine and Larry Brown. In 1970, Polley registered Badfinger Enterprises, Inc. as a corporate entity for management of the British rock group Badfinger, which had no American representation at the time.

=== Embezzlement ===
In 1971, Polley was named during US Senate investigation hearings as an intermediary between unnamed crime figures and a New York Supreme Court judge. Most of Polley's American clients said they were already suspicious of their manager by this point, but the publicity of the hearings convinced several to sever ties with him.

The following year, in 1972, Polley negotiated a record contract with Warner Bros. Records for Badfinger, which had its advances paid into an escrow account belonging to Polley. In 1974, Warner's publishing division filed a lawsuit against Polley when it was unsuccessful in locating the funds. The legal morass crippled Badfinger financially; leading to band leader Pete Ham taking his own life on April 24, 1975. His suicide note directly blamed Polley for his financial ruin. Eight years later bandmate Tom Evans died by suicide on November 19, 1983.

=== Conviction ===
In 1991, Polley pleaded no contest to charges of misappropriating funds and money laundering in Riverside County, California. Aeronautics engineer Peter Brock accused Polley of swindling him out of $250,000 (equivalent to $591,000 in 2025) after the two set up a corporation to manufacture airplane engines. Polley was placed on probation for five years and ordered by the court to return all missing funds to Brock, although the complainant said the restitution never materialized.

== Death ==
Polley died in Rancho Mirage, California, on July 20, 2009.

== Clients ==
Polley's clients included Badfinger, singer-producer Hank Medress, musician Al Kooper, singer Lou Christie, Michael Cooper, Charles Calello, Sandy Linzer, Marty Ross and Bob Lewis. Multiple financial dealings by Polley were found to be irregular and to the detriment of his clients, scamming them and causing the acts to fall apart.

== Sources ==
- Matovina, Dan (January 1, 2000), Without You: The Tragic Story of Badfinger, Frances Glover Books, ISBN 978-0-9657122-2-4
- Brennan, Tom (1998–2012), Badfinger Library news page, badfinge.ipower.com
