= Wish You Were Here (Badfinger album) =

Studio album by Badfinger
- Released: 14 October 1974
- Recorded: 9 April – 7 May 1974
- Studios: Caribou Ranch, Nederland, Colorado; AIR, London, UK
- Genre: Power pop
- Length: 36:00
- Label: Warner Bros.
- Producer: Chris Thomas

Badfinger chronology
Badfinger (1974)	Wish You Were Here (1974)	Airwaves (1979)

Professional ratings
Review scores
Source	Rating
AllMusic	4/5 stars
Encyclopedia of Popular Music	4/5 stars

Wish You Were Here is the seventh studio album by the Welsh rock band Badfinger and their third consecutive album produced by Chris Thomas. It was recorded in the spring of 1974 at Colorado's Caribou Ranch and released in November of that year on Warner Bros. Records. Wish You Were Here was the second and last album the band released on the Warner Bros. label.

== History ==
Although the album received a favourable review in Rolling Stone magazine and is sometimes considered to be the band's best work, it was withdrawn from record stores in early 1975, seven weeks after release, because of a lawsuit between Warner music publishing and Badfinger's management. The album's abbreviated manufacturing run and short tenure on the market has made the original LP relatively rare.

Before being recalled, Wish You Were Here had time enough to chart, peaking at number 148 in the United States. In the 1990s it was re-released in CD format in Japan and Germany only. The album was issued on CD in the US in 2007. Many of the tracks have appeared on Badfinger compilation albums.

Classic Rock critic Rob Hughes considered two songs from Wish You Were Here, "Meanwhile Back at the Ranch / Should I Smoke?" and "Dennis", among Badfinger's top 10 songs. Hughes said of "Dennis" "This stately pop-rock beauty, from Badfinger’s most underrated album, remains one of Pete Ham’s very finest pieces, from its elegant intro to its extended fadeout" and said that it is "essentially a warning about the potholes of life" and "an affirmative love song that offers parental guidance."

After completing Wish You Were Here, Pete Ham left Badfinger; he was replaced by keyboardist/guitarist Bob Jackson. However, after Warner indicated that it would drop the band if Ham quit, he agreed to return, and Badfinger completed a tour as a five-piece group. Following this tour, Joey Molland resigned from the band.

The next Badfinger release was the Molland–Evans reunion album Airwaves in 1979. Ham, Evans, Gibbins and Jackson recorded an album titled Head First in December 1974 before Pete Ham hanged himself in April 1975. The latter album was the band's seventh and last with the original Ham–Evans–Gibbins nucleus that dated back to the late 1960s, when the group was known as the Iveys. Head First was not released until 2000, however, because of further lawsuits between Warner Bros. and Badfinger's management.

Real Gone Music released an "Expanded" version of the album 30 November 2018. A further expanded edition comprising 40 tracks including those from Badfinger was released 3 January 2020 with the title Shine On 1974.

== Cover ==
The cover for this album features the members dressed in sailor outfits. The members that appear (from left to right) are Pete Ham, Tom Evans, Joey Molland, and Mike Gibbins.

== Track listing ==
Side one

1. "Just a Chance" (Pete Ham) – 2:58
2. "You're So Fine" (Mike Gibbins) – 3:03
3. "Got to Get Out of Here" (Joey Molland) – 3:31
4. "Know One Knows" (Ham) – 3:17
5. "Dennis" (Ham) – 5:15

Side two

1. "In the Meantime/Some Other Time" (Gibbins, Molland) – 6:46
2. "Love Time" (Molland) – 2:20
3. "King of the Load (T)" (Tom Evans) – 3:32
4. "Meanwhile Back at the Ranch/Should I Smoke" (Ham, Molland) – 5:18

=== 2018 "Expanded" Real Gone Music version ===
1. "Just a Chance"
2. "You're So Fine"
3. "Got to Get Out of Here"
4. "Know One Knows"
5. "Dennis"
6. "In the Meantime/Some Other Time"
7. "Love Time"
8. "King of the Load (T)"
9. "Meanwhile Back at the Ranch/Should I Smoke"
10. "Queen of Darkness" (Evans) (unreleased song mixed 2018)
11. "Just a Chance" (alternate mix 2018)
12. "You're So Fine" (alternate mix 2018)
13. "Got to Get Out of Here" (alternate mix 2018)
14. "Know One Knows" (alternate mix 2018)
15. "Dennis" (alternate mix 2018)
16. "In the Meantime / Some Other Time" (alternate mix 2018)
17. "Love Time" (alternate mix 2018)
18. "Meanwhile Back at the Ranch / Should I Smoke" (alternate mix 2018)

== Personnel ==
- Pete Ham – vocals, guitar, keyboards
- Joey Molland – vocals, guitar
- Mike Gibbins – drums, keyboards, lead vocals on "In the Meantime"
- Tom Evans – vocals, bass

Additional contributors

- Average White Horns – horns on "Just a Chance" and "Should I Smoke"
- Mika Fukui - vocals on "Know One Knows"

== Charts ==
Chart (1974)	Peak position
US Billboard 200	148
