= Indian Summer =

An Indian summer is a period of unseasonably sunny, warm weather in autumn.

Indian Summer may refer to:

== Film ==
- An Indian Summer, a 1912 American short film starting Mary Pickford - see Mary Pickford filmography
- Indian Summer (1970 film), a Yugoslav film by Nikola Tanhofer
- Indian Summer (1972 film), a French/ Italian film by Valerio Zurlini
- Indian Summer (1973 film), a Bulgarian comedy-drama film by Milen Nikolov
- Indian Summer (1993 film), an American comedy-drama film by Mike Binder
- Indian Summer (1996 film) or Alive & Kicking, a British drama film by Nancy Meckler
- Indian Summer (2013 film), a film by Simon Brook

== Television ==
- "Indian Summer", a 1973 episode of Man Alive
- "Indian Summer" (Dawson's Creek), a 1999 episode
- "Indian Summer" (Mad Men), a 2007 episode
- Indian Summers, a 2015 British drama on Channel 4

== Literature ==
- Indian Summer (Stifter novel) (Der Nachsommer), an 1857 Austrian novel by Adalbert Stifter
- Indian Summer (Howells novel), an 1886 American novel by William Dean Howells
- "Indian Summer" (story), a 1932 American short story by Erskine Caldwell
- Indian Summer, a 1966 American novel by John Knowles
- "Indian Summer" (poem), a 1976 poem by Jayanta Mahapatra
- Indian Summer (manga), a 2004 Japanese manga by Takehito Mizuki
- Indian Summer: The Secret History of the End of an Empire, a 2007 British non-fiction book by Alex von Tunzelmann
- John Wright's Indian Summers, a 2007 book about cricket

== Music ==
=== Artists ===
- Indian Summer (British band), a progressive rock band active from 1969 to 1972
- Indian Summer (American band), an emo/post-hardcore band active from 1993 to 1994
- Indian Summer (record producer), an Australian electronic record producer active from 2010

=== Albums and EPs ===
- Indian Summer (Poco album) (1977)
- Live/Indian Summer, a 1981 album by Al Stewart
- Indian Summer (Go West album) (1992)
- Indian Summer (EP), a 1993 self-titled EP by Indian Summer
- Indian Summer, a 1996 album by the band Landberk
- Indian Summer (Mick Ronson album) (2001)
- Indian Summer (Carbon Leaf album) (2004)
- Indian Summer, a 2007 album by Dave Brubeck
- Indian Summer, a 2015 album by the band Hellions

=== Songs ===
- "Indian Summer" (Victor Herbert song) (1919) With lyrics added by Al Dubin in 1939, it was recorded the same year by Tommy Dorsey and His Orchestra and became a jazz standard.
- "Indian Summer", from If Only for a Moment (1969) by the Blossom Toes
- "Indian Summer", from Morrison Hotel (1970) by the Doors
- "Indian Summer", from The House on the Hill (1971) by Audience
- "Indian Summer", an instrumental piece by Gary Bolstad, used in 1972 by Hannes Wader in "Heute hier, morgen dort"
- "L'Été indien" or "Indian Summer", a 1975 French song by Joe Dassin
- "Indian Summer", from But Seriously, Folks... (1978) by Joe Walsh
- "Indian Summer" (The Belle Stars song) (1983)
- "Indian Summer", by Larry Gatlin, Roy Orbison and Barry Gibb (1985)
- "Indian Summer", by The Dream Academy (1987)
- "Indian Summer", from Jamboree (1988), by Beat Happening
- "Indian Summer", from Control (2002) by Pedro the Lion
- "Indian Summer", from A Thousand Kisses Deep (2003) by Chris Botti
- "Indian Summer" (Manic Street Preachers song) (2007)
- "Indian Summer", from Here & Now (2007) by America
- "Indian Summer" (Brooks & Dunn song) (2009)
- "Indian Summer", from Free (2009) by Gavin DeGraw
- "Indian Summer" (Stereophonics song) (2013)

== Art ==
- Indian Summer (painting), an 1875 painting by Polish painter Józef Chełmoński

== See also ==
- L'Été indien (disambiguation) (French for "Indian summer")
- Engine Summer, a 1979 novel by John Crowley
