= L'Été indien (disambiguation) =

"L'Été indien" is a 1975 French song by Joe Dassin, with a number of cover versions.

L'Été Indien may also refer to:

- L'Été indien (TV program), 2014
- "L'été indien", a 2021 song by Le Commandant Couche-Tôt featuring Omar Lye-Fook
- "L'Ete indien", a 1957 poem by Claude Vigée
- L'Été indien, a 1975 album by Paul Mauriat

== See also ==
- Indian Summer (disambiguation)
