= Bessie Smith =

American blues singer (1892–1937)

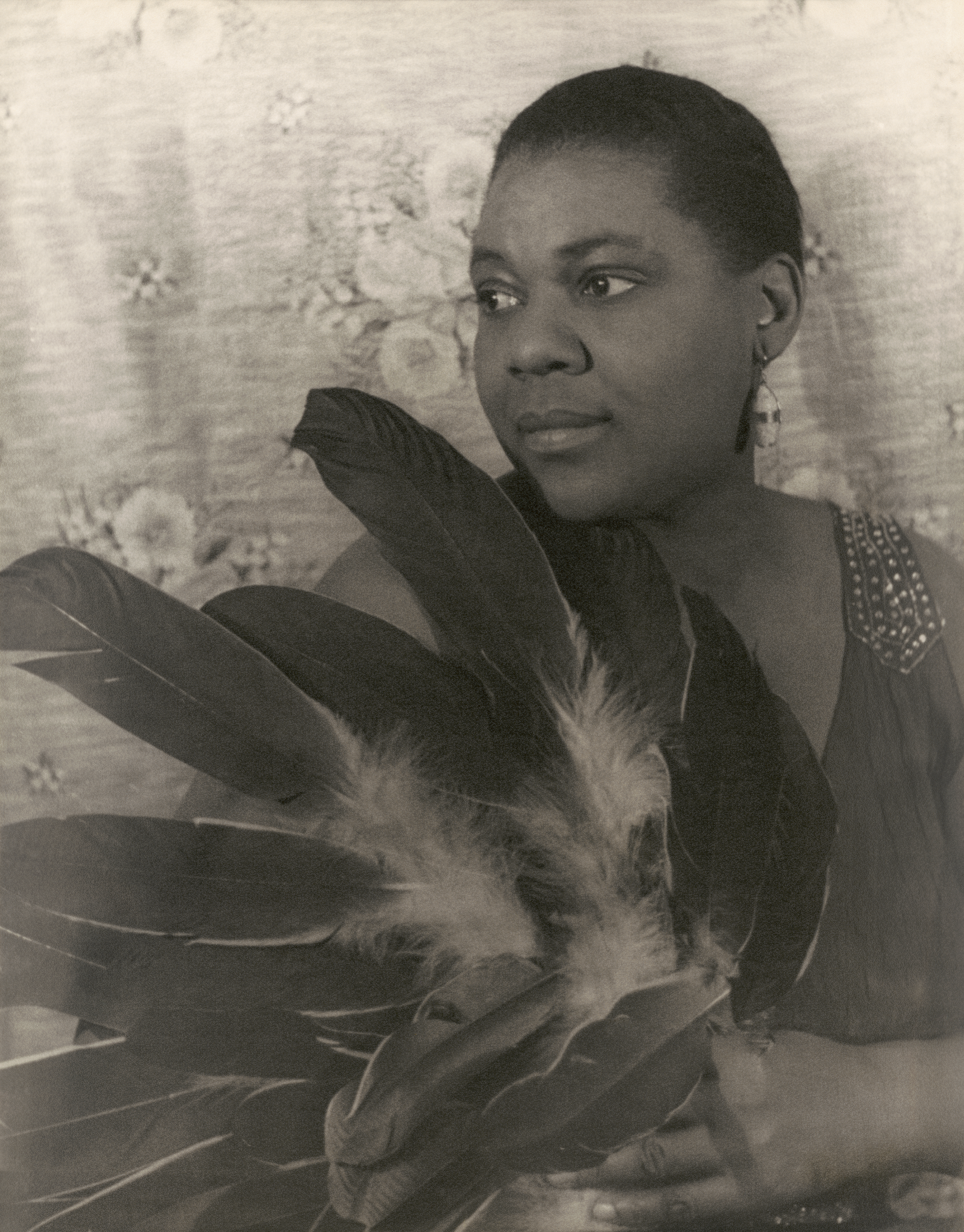
- Smith in 1936

Background information
- Also known as: Empress of the Blues
- Born: April 15, 1892; Chattanooga, Tennessee, U.S.
- Died: September 26, 1937 (aged 45) Clarksdale, Mississippi, U.S.
- Genres: Classic blues; jazz
- Occupations: Singer; actress
- Instrument: Vocals
- Years active: 1912–1937
- Labels: Columbia; Okeh

Bessie Smith (April 15, 1892 – September 26, 1937) was an American blues singer widely renowned during the Jazz Age. Nicknamed the "Empress of the Blues" and formerly Queen of the Blues, she was the most popular female blues singer of the 1930s. Inducted into the Rock and Roll Hall of Fame in 1989, she is often regarded as one of the greatest singers of her era and was a major influence on fellow blues singers, as well as jazz vocalists.

Born in Chattanooga, Tennessee, Smith was young when her parents died, and she and her six siblings survived by performing on street corners. She began touring and performed in a group that included Ma Rainey, and then went out on her own. Her successful recording career with Columbia Records began in 1923, but her performing career was cut short by a car crash that killed her at the age of 45.

== Biography ==
=== Early life ===
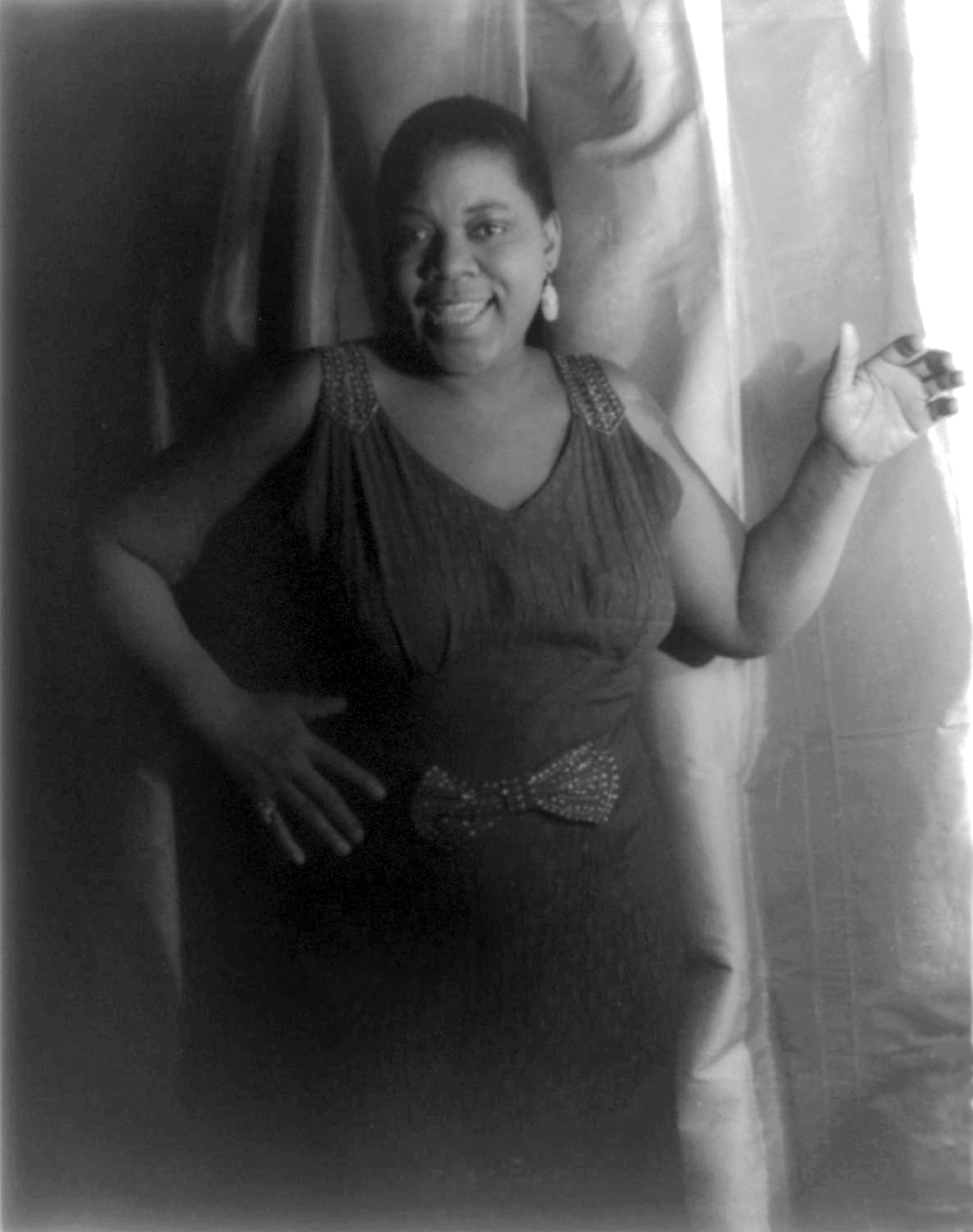
Smith in 1936

The 1900 census indicates that her family reported that Bessie Smith was born in Chattanooga, Tennessee, in July 1892. The 1910 census gives her age as 16, and a birth date of April 15, 1894, which appears on subsequent documents and was observed as her birthday by the Smith family. The 1870 and 1880 censuses report several older siblings or half-siblings.

Smith was the daughter of Laura and William Smith, a laborer and part-time Baptist preacher (he was listed in the 1870 census as a "minister of the gospel", in Moulton, Lawrence County, Alabama). He died while his daughter was too young to remember him. By the time Bessie was nine, her mother and a brother had also died and her older sister Viola took charge of caring for her siblings. As a consequence, Bessie was unable to gain an education.

Due to her parents' death and her poverty, Bessie experienced a "wretched childhood." To earn money for their impoverished household, Bessie and her brother Andrew busked on the streets of Chattanooga. She sang and danced as he played the guitar. They often performed on "street corners for pennies," and their habitual location was in front of the White Elephant Saloon at Thirteenth and Elm streets, in the heart of the city's African-American community.

In 1904, her oldest brother Clarence left home and joined a small traveling troupe owned by Moses Stokes. "If Bessie had been old enough, she would have gone with him," said Clarence's widow, Maud. "That's why he left without telling her, but Clarence told me she was ready, even then. Of course, she was only a child."

In 1912, Clarence returned to Chattanooga with the Stokes troupe and arranged an audition for his sister with the troupe managers, Lonnie and Cora Fisher. Bessie was hired as a dancer rather than a vocalist since the company already included popular singer Ma Rainey. Contemporary accounts indicate that, while Ma Rainey did not teach Smith to sing, she likely helped her develop a stage presence. Smith eventually moved on to performing in chorus lines, making the "81" Theatre in Atlanta her home base. She also performed in shows on the black-owned Theater Owners Booking Association (T.O.B.A.) circuit and would become one of its major attractions.

=== Career ===
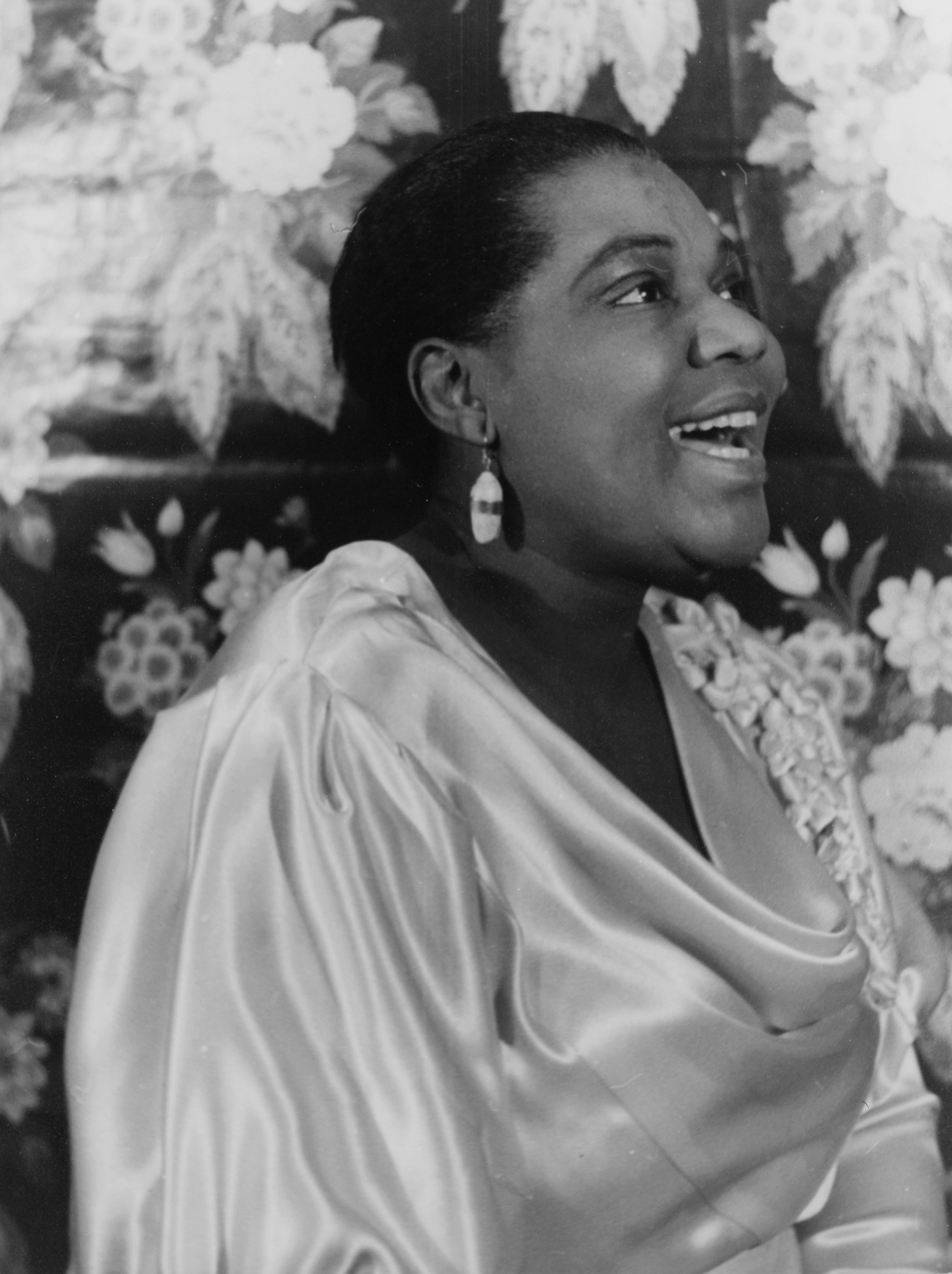
Portrait of Smith by Carl Van Vechten

Bessie Smith began forming her own act around 1913, at Atlanta's "81" Theater. By 1920, she had established a reputation in the South and along the East Coast. At the time, sales of over 100,000 copies of "Crazy Blues", recorded for Okeh Records by the singer Mamie Smith (no relation), pointed to a new market. The recording industry had not directed its product to black people, but the success of the record led to a search for female blues singers.

"Downhearted Blues" (1923)
Bessie Smith's 1923 hit cover of "Downhearted Blues".

Hoping to capitalize on this new market, Smith began her recording career in 1923. She was signed to Columbia Records in 1923 by Frank Walker, a talent agent who had seen her perform years earlier. Her first recording session for Columbia was on February 15, 1923; it was engineered by Dan Hornsby who was recording and discovering many southern music talents of that era. For most of 1923, her records were issued on Columbia's regular A-series. When the company established a "race records" series, Smith's "Cemetery Blues" (September 26, 1923) was the first issued. Both sides of her first record, "Downhearted Blues" backed with "Gulf Coast Blues", were hits (an earlier recording of "Downhearted Blues" by its co-writer Alberta Hunter had previously been released by Paramount Records).

As her popularity increased, Smith became a headliner on the Theatre Owners Booking Association (T.O.B.A.) circuit and rose to become its top attraction in the 1920s. Working a heavy theater schedule during the winter and performing in tent shows the rest of the year, Smith became the highest-paid black entertainer of her day and began traveling in her own 72-foot-long railroad car. Columbia's publicity department nicknamed her "Queen of the Blues", but the national press soon upgraded her title to "Empress of the Blues". Smith's music stressed independence, fearlessness, and sexual freedom, implicitly arguing that working-class women did not have to alter their behavior to be worthy of respect.

Despite her success, neither she nor her music was accepted in all circles. She once auditioned for Black Swan Records (W. E. B. Du Bois was on its board of directors) and was dismissed because she was considered too rough as she supposedly stopped singing to spit. The businessmen involved with Black Swan Records were surprised when she became the most successful diva because her style was rougher and coarser than Mamie Smith. Even her admirers—white and black—considered her a "rough" woman (i.e., working class or even "low class").

Smith had a strong contralto voice, which recorded well from her first session, which was conducted when recordings were made acoustically. The advent of electrical recording made the power of her voice even more evident. Her first electrical recording was "Cake Walking Babies [From Home]", recorded on May 5, 1925. Smith also benefited from the new technology of radio broadcasting, even on stations in the segregated South. For example, after giving a concert to a white-only audience at a theater in Memphis, Tennessee, in October 1923, she performed a late-night concert on a Memphis radio station, WMC, which was well received by the audience. Musicians and composers like Danny Barker and Tommy Dorsey compared her presence and delivery to a preacher because of her ability to enrapture and move her audience.

"Alexander's Ragtime Band" (1927)
A sample of Bessie Smith's 1927 cover of "Alexander's Ragtime Band".

She made 160 recordings for Columbia, often accompanied by the finest musicians of the day, notably Louis Armstrong, Coleman Hawkins, Fletcher Henderson, James P. Johnson, Joe Smith, and Charlie Green. A number of Smith's recordings—such as "Alexander's Ragtime Band" in 1927—quickly became among the best-selling records of their release years.

==== Broadway ====
Smith's career was cut short by the Great Depression, which nearly put the recording industry out of business, and the advent of sound in film, which spelled the end of vaudeville. She never stopped performing, however. The days of elaborate vaudeville shows were over, but Smith continued touring and occasionally sang in clubs. In 1929, she appeared in a Broadway musical, Pansy. The musical was a flop; top critics said she was its only asset.

==== Film ====
St. Louis Blues, Smith's only film, 1929

In November 1929, Smith made her only film appearance, starring in a two-reeler, St. Louis Blues, based on composer W. C. Handy's song of the same name. In the film, directed by Dudley Murphy and shot in Astoria, Queens, she sings the title song accompanied by members of Fletcher Henderson's orchestra, the Hall Johnson Choir, the pianist James P. Johnson and a string section, a musical environment radically different from that of any of her recordings.

==== Swing era ====
In 1933, John Henry Hammond, who also mentored Billie Holiday, asked Smith to record four sides for Okeh (which had been acquired by Columbia Records in 1925). He claimed to have found her in semi-obscurity, "working as a hostess in a speakeasy on Ridge Avenue in Philadelphia." Smith worked at Art's Cafe on Ridge Avenue, but not as a hostess and not until the summer of 1936. In 1933, when she made the Okeh sides, she was still touring. Hammond was known for his selective memory and gratuitous embellishments.

Smith was paid a non-royalty fee of $37.50 for each selection on these Okeh sides, which were her last recordings. Made on November 24, 1933, they serve as a hint of the transformation she made in her performances as she shifted her blues artistry into something that fit the swing era. The relatively modern accompaniment is notable. The band included such swing era musicians as the trombonist Jack Teagarden, the trumpeter Frankie Newton, the tenor saxophonist Chu Berry, the pianist Buck Washington, the guitarist Bobby Johnson, and the bassist Billy Taylor. Benny Goodman, who happened to be recording with Ethel Waters in the adjoining studio, dropped by and is barely audible on one selection. Hammond was not entirely pleased with the results, preferring to have Smith revisit her old blues sound. "Take Me for a Buggy Ride" and "Gimme a Pigfoot", both written by Wesley Wilson, were among her most popular recordings.

=== Death ===
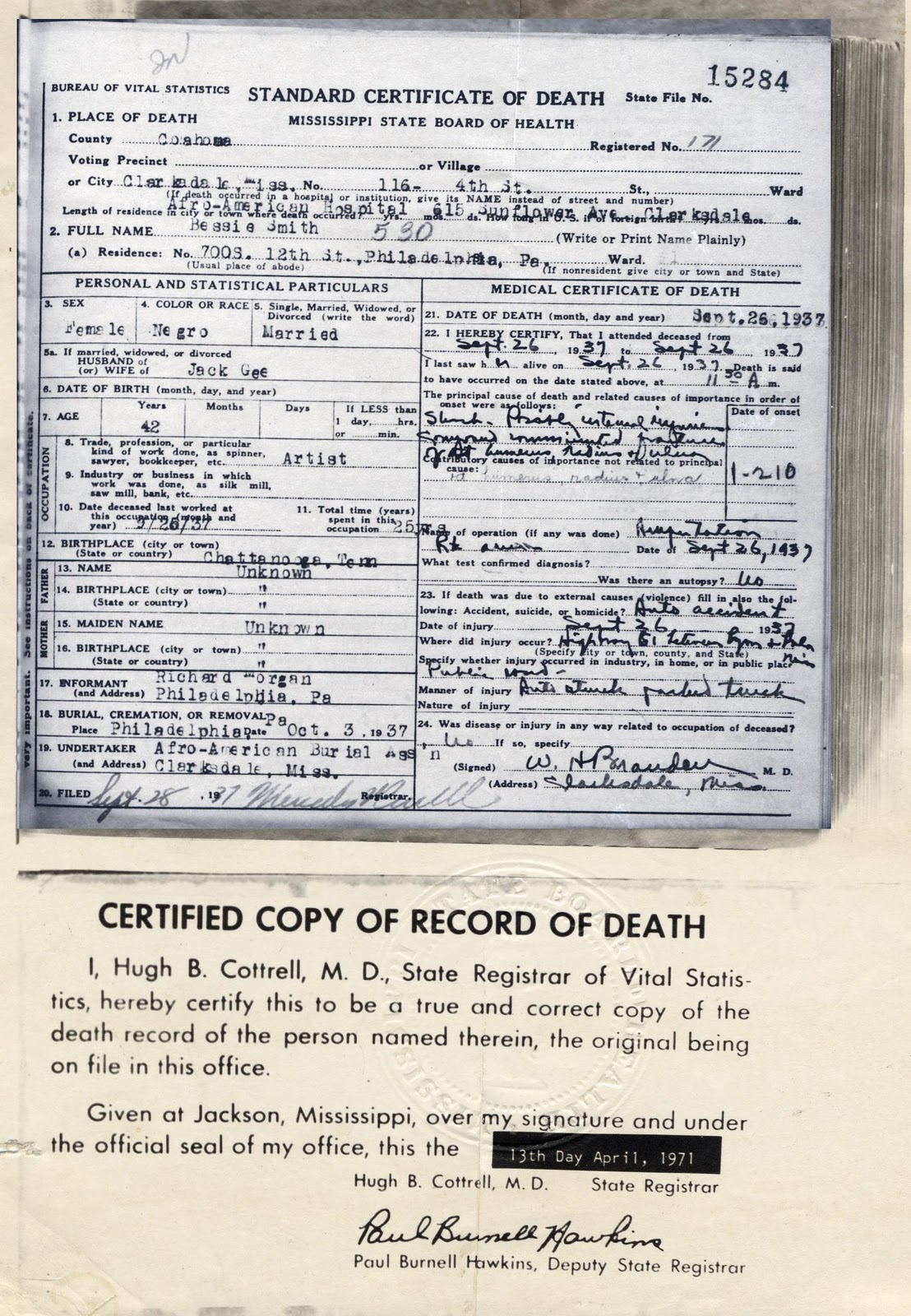
Smith's death certificate

On September 26, 1937, Smith was critically injured in a car crash on U.S. Route 61 between Memphis, Tennessee, and Clarksdale, Mississippi. Her lover, Richard Morgan, was driving, and misjudged the speed of a slow-moving truck ahead of him. Skid marks at the scene suggested that Morgan tried to avoid the truck by driving around its left side, but he hit the rear of the truck side-on at high speed. The tailgate of the truck sheared off the wooden roof of Smith's old Packard vehicle. Smith, who was in the passenger seat, probably with her right arm or elbow out the window, took the full brunt of the impact. Morgan escaped without injuries.

The first person on the scene was a Memphis surgeon, Dr. Hugh Smith (no relation). In the early 1970s, Hugh Smith gave a detailed account of his experience to Bessie's biographer Chris Albertson. This is the most reliable eyewitness testimony about the events surrounding her death. Arriving at the scene, Dr. Smith examined Smith, who was lying in the middle of the road with obviously severe injuries. He estimated she had lost about a half pint (240 mL) of blood, and immediately noted a major traumatic injury: her right arm was almost completely severed at the elbow.

Dr. Smith stated that this injury alone did not cause her death. Though the light was poor, he observed only minor head injuries. He attributed her death to extensive and severe crush injuries to the entire right side of her body, consistent with a sideswipe collision. Henry Broughton, a fishing partner of Dr. Smith's, helped him move Smith to the shoulder of the road. Dr. Smith dressed her arm injury with a clean handkerchief and asked Broughton to go to a house about 500 feet (150 m) off the road to call an ambulance. By the time Broughton returned, about 25 minutes later, Smith was in shock.

Time passed with no sign of the ambulance, so Dr. Smith suggested that they take her into Clarksdale in his car. He and Broughton had almost finished clearing the back seat when they heard the sound of a car approaching at high speed. Dr. Smith flashed his lights in warning, but the oncoming car failed to slow and plowed into his car at full speed. It sent his car careening into Smith's overturned Packard, completely wrecking it. The oncoming car ricocheted off Hugh Smith's car into the ditch on the right, barely missing Broughton and Bessie Smith.

The young couple in the speeding car did not sustain life-threatening injuries. Two ambulances then arrived from Clarksdale—one from the black hospital, summoned by Broughton, the second from the white hospital, acting on a report from the truck driver, who had not seen the crash victims. Smith was taken to the G. T. Thomas Afro-American Hospital in Clarksdale, where her right arm was amputated. She died that morning without regaining consciousness.

After her death, an often repeated, but now discredited story emerged that she died because a whites-only hospital in Clarksdale refused to admit her. The jazz writer and producer John Hammond gave this account in an article in the November 1937 issue of DownBeat magazine. The circumstances of Smith's death and the rumor reported by Hammond formed the basis for Edward Albee's 1959 one-act play The Death of Bessie Smith. "The Bessie Smith ambulance would not have gone to a white hospital; you can forget that", Hugh Smith told Albertson. "Down in the Deep South Cotton Belt, no ambulance driver, or white driver, would even have thought of putting a colored person off in a hospital for white folks."

Smith's funeral was held in Philadelphia a little over a week later, on October 4, 1937. Initially, her body was laid out at Upshur's funeral home. As word of her death spread through Philadelphia's black community, her body had to be moved to the O. V. Catto Elks Lodge to accommodate the estimated 10,000 mourners who filed past her coffin on Sunday, October 3. Contemporary newspapers reported that her funeral was attended by about seven thousand people. Far fewer mourners attended the burial at Mount Lawn Cemetery, in nearby Sharon Hill. Jack Gee thwarted all efforts to purchase a stone for his estranged wife, once or twice pocketing money raised for that purpose.

==== Unmarked grave ====
Smith's grave remained unmarked until a tombstone was erected on August 7, 1970, paid for by the singer Janis Joplin and Juanita Green, who as a child had done housework for Smith. Dory Previn wrote a song about Joplin and the tombstone, "Stone for Bessie Smith", for her album Mythical Kings and Iguanas. The Afro-American Hospital (now the Riverside Hotel) was the site of the dedication of the fourth historical marker on the Mississippi Blues Trail.

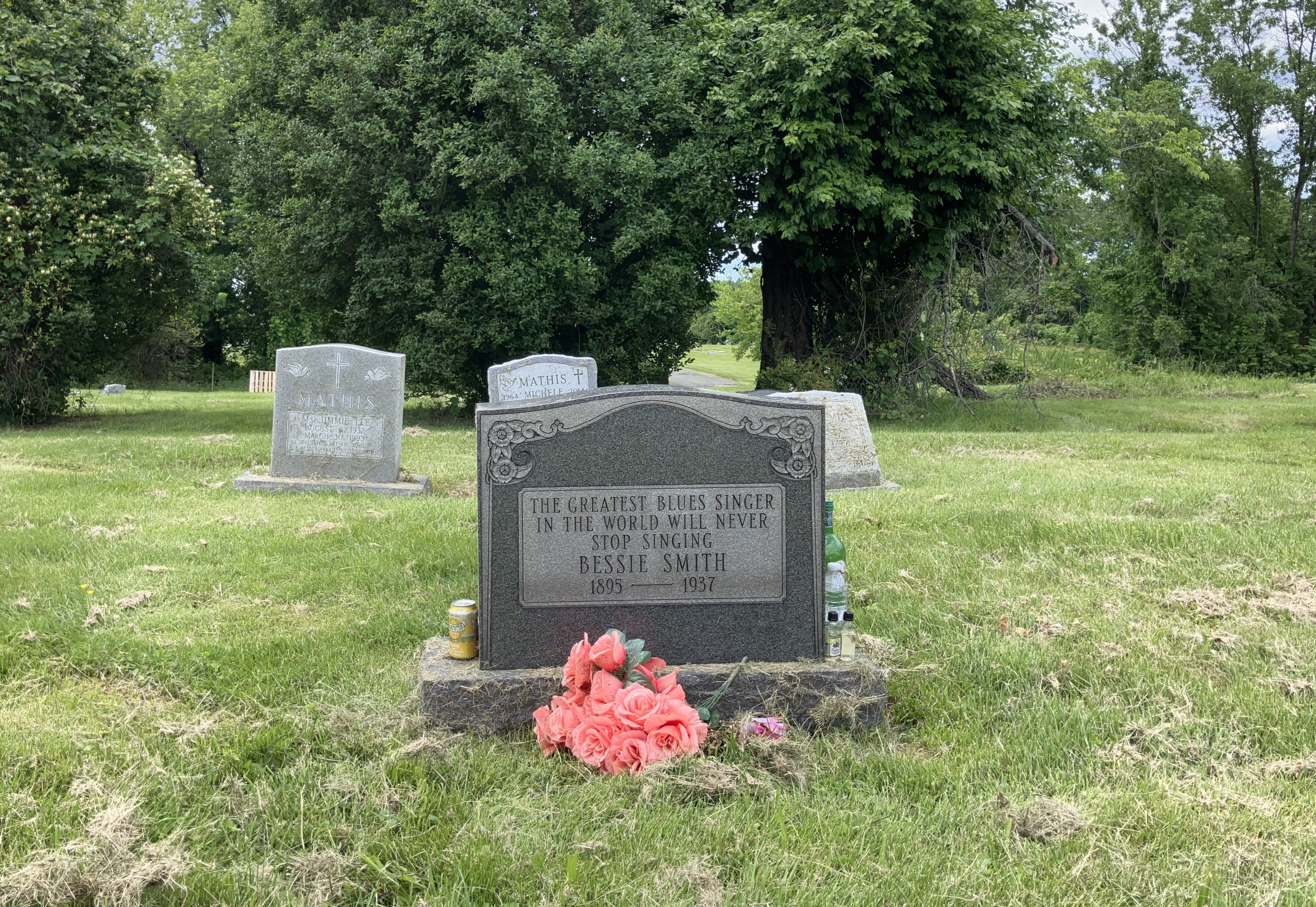
Smith's grave

== Personal life ==
In 1923, Smith was living in Philadelphia when she met Jack Gee, a security guard, whom she married on June 7, 1923, just as her first record was being released. During the marriage, Smith became the highest-paid Black entertainer of the day, heading her own shows, which sometimes featured as many as 40 troupers, and touring in her own custom-built railroad car.

In the 1920s and 30s African Americans had limited options in terms of hotels and other spaces to gather. To meet this need, establishments were created by and for African Americans called Buffet Flats, which featured expensive food, free-flowing booze, and sex shows (see also, Prostitution in Harlem Renaissance). Smith frequented Buffet Flats after concerts with friends, including drag queens and gay men who viewed it as a safe haven. Her friends reported that a lot of people would pay top dollar to see the sex shows at the buffet, and it has been reported that she would engage in sexual activities with both men and women, including her longtime friend and lover Ruby Walker, both before and during her relationship with Jack Gee.

Her marriage to Gee was stormy, with infidelity on both sides, including Smith's numerous female lovers. Gee was impressed by the money Smith made during her career, but never adjusted to show business life, or to her bisexuality. He would leave periodically, and Smith would use this as an opportunity to have affairs, including with her musical director Fred Longshaw. When Gee found out about this, he physically assaulted Smith, but she got back up quickly and started beating him. When she found out about one of her husband's affairs, she proceeded to get Gee's gun, and shot at him. In 1929, when she learned of his affair with another singer, Gertrude Saunders, Smith ended the relationship, although neither of them sought a divorce.

Smith later entered a common-law marriage with an old friend, Richard Morgan, who was Lionel Hampton's uncle. She stayed with him until her death.

== Musical themes ==
Songs like "Jail House Blues", "Work House Blues", "Prison Blues", "Sing Sing Prison Blues" and "Send Me to the 'Lectric Chair" dealt critically with social issues of the day such as chain gangs, the convict lease system and capital punishment. "Poor Man's Blues" and "Washwoman's Blues" are considered by scholars to be an early form of African-American protest music.

What becomes evident after listening to her music and studying her lyrics is that Smith emphasized and channeled a subculture within the African-American working class. Additionally, she incorporated commentary on social issues like poverty, intra-racial conflict, and female sexuality into her lyrics. Her lyrical sincerity and public behavior were not widely accepted as appropriate expressions for African-American women; therefore, her work was often written off as distasteful or unseemly, rather than as an accurate representation of the African-American experience.

Smith's work challenged elitist norms by encouraging working-class women to embrace their right to drink, party, and satisfy their sexual needs as a means of coping with stress and dissatisfaction in their daily lives. Smith advocated for a wider vision of African-American womanhood beyond domesticity, piety, and conformity; she sought empowerment and happiness through independence, sassiness, and sexual freedom. Although Smith was a voice for many minority groups and one of the most gifted blues performers of her time, the themes in her music were unacceptable at the time (however, in decades after her death, these themes were more widely expressed in popular music), which led to many believing that her work was undeserving of serious recognition.

Smith's lyrics are often speculated to have portrayed her sexuality. In "Prove it On Me", performed by Ma Rainey, Rainey famously sang, "Went out last night with a crowd of my friends. They must've been women, 'cause I don't like no mens.. they say I do it, ain't nobody caught me. Sure got to prove it on me." African American queer theorists and activists have often looked to Ma Rainey and Bessie Smith as "gender-bending" role models of the early 20th-century blues era.

== Awards and honors ==
=== Grammy Hall of Fame ===
Three recordings by Smith were inducted into the Grammy Hall of Fame, an award established in 1973 to honor recordings that are at least 25 years old and that have "qualitative or historical significance".

Bessie Smith: Grammy Hall of Fame Award
Year Recorded	Title	Genre	Label	Year Inducted
1923	"Downhearted Blues"	Blues (single)	Columbia	2006
1925	"St. Louis Blues"	Jazz (single)	Columbia	1993
1928	"Empty Bed Blues"	Blues (single)	Columbia	1983

=== National Recording Registry ===
In 2002, Smith's recording of "Downhearted Blues" was included in the National Recording Registry by the National Recording Preservation Board of the Library of Congress. The board annually selects recordings that are "culturally, historically, or aesthetically significant".

"Downhearted Blues" was also included in the list of Songs of the Century by the Recording Industry of America and the National Endowment for the Arts in 2001, and in the Rock and Roll Hall of Fame's 500 songs that shaped rock 'n' roll.

=== Inductions ===
Year Inducted	Category	Notes
2008	Nesuhi Ertegun Jazz Hall of Fame	Jazz at Lincoln Center, New York
1989	Grammy Lifetime Achievement Award	
1989	Rock and Roll Hall of Fame	"Early influences"
1981	Big Band and Jazz Hall of Fame	
1980	Blues Hall of Fame	
1984	National Women's Hall of Fame	

=== U.S. postage stamp ===
The U.S. Postal Service issued a 29-cent commemorative postage stamp honoring Smith in 1994.

=== Other ===
In 2019 Time created 89 new covers to celebrate women of the year starting from 1920; it chose Smith for 1923.

In 2023, Rolling Stone ranked Smith at No. 33 on their list of the 200 Greatest Singers of All Time.

== In pop culture ==
The 1948 short story "Blue Melody", by J. D. Salinger, and the 1959 play The Death of Bessie Smith, by Edward Albee, are based on Smith's life and death, but poetic license was taken by both authors; for instance, Albee's play distorts the circumstances of her medical treatment, or lack of it, before her death, attributing it to racist medical practitioners. The circumstances related by both Salinger and Albee were widely circulated until being debunked at a later date by Smith's biographer.

Dinah Washington and LaVern Baker released tribute albums to Smith in 1958. Released on Exodus Records in 1965, Hoyt Axton Sings Bessie Smith is another collection of Smith's songs performed by folk singer Hoyt Axton.

The song "Bessie Smith" by The Band first appeared on The Basement Tapes in 1975, but probably dates from 1970 to 1971, although musician Artie Traum recalls bumping into Rick Danko, the co-writer of the song, at Woodstock in 1969, who sang a verse of "Going Down The Road to See Bessie" on the spot.

Her song "See If I'll Care" was sampled by Indian Summer throughout their self-titled EP, released in 1993. The release was received well by critics, noting how the sample helped contrast the post-hardcore and emo styles of the rest of the release. When their discography was reissued in 2019 to acclaim, Smith and the song also saw a boost in popularity.

She was the subject of a 1997 biography by Jackie Kay, reissued in February 2021 and featuring as Book of the Week on BBC Radio 4, read in an abridged version by the author.

In the 2015 HBO film Bessie, Queen Latifah portrays Smith, focusing on the struggle and transition of Smith's life and sexuality. The film was well received critically and garnered four Primetime Emmy Awards, winning Outstanding Television Movie.

In the medical show New Amsterdam, season 2 episode 16, the character Reynolds says Bessie Smith's accident, and the myth she was first taken to a white hospital and denied care, was what inspired him and his treatment plans. The show did get the fact that she had an unmarked grave corrected and mentioned her legacy in the world of blues.

Each June, the Bessie Smith Cultural Center in Chattanooga sponsors the Bessie Smith Strut as part of the city's Riverbend Festival.

== Digital remastering ==
Technical faults in the majority of her original gramophone recordings (especially variations in recording speed, which raised or lowered the apparent pitch of her voice) misrepresented the "light and shade" of her phrasing, interpretation and delivery. They altered the apparent key of her performances (sometimes raised or lowered by as much as a semitone). The "center hole" in some of the master recordings had not been in the true middle of the master disc, so that there were wide variations in tone, pitch, key and phrasing, as commercially released records revolved around the spindle.

Given those historic limitations, the 70 LP complete recordings and even more the digitally remastered versions of her work deliver noticeable improvements in the sound quality. Some critics believe that the American Columbia Records compact disc releases are somewhat inferior to subsequent transfers made by the late John R. T. Davies for Frog Records.

== Discography ==
Throughout her entire music career (1923-1933), Bessie Smith recorded 156 tracks for Columbia Records and 4 for the subsidiary OKeh. This makes it quite easy to acquire her complete musical works, which were first released in the 1970s across the following five double albums: The World's Greatest Blues Singer (1970), Any Woman's Blues (1970), Empty Bed Blues (1971), The Empress (1971), Nobody's Blues But Mine (1972). Those recordings were later reissued on LPs and CDs in the 1990s under The Complete Recordings (Vol. 1-5).

- 1923-24 – The Complete Recordings Vol. 1 (2XLp or CD) (Columbia/Legacy, 1991)
- 1925-25 – The Complete Recordings Vol. 2 (2XLp or CD) (Columbia/Legacy, 1991)
- 1925-28 – The Complete Recordings Vol. 3 (2XLp or CD) (Columbia/Legacy, 1992)
- 1928-31 – The Complete Recordings Vol. 4 (2XLp or CD) (Columbia/Legacy, 1993)
- 1932-33 – The Complete Recordings Vol. 5 (2XLp or CD) (Columbia/Legacy, 1996)
- 1923-33 – The Complete Recordings Vols. 1-8 (8xCD) (Frog, 2001)

First editions in 10 and 12" LPs

- Bessie Smith Album (Columbia, 1938) 6 shellac 10" Lp 78 rpm albums
- Empress of the Blues (Columbia, 1940) shellac 10" Lp 78 rpm album
- Empress of the Blues, Vol. II (Columbia, 1947) shellac 10" Lp 78 rpm album
- The Bessie Smith Story, in 4 Volumes (Columbia, 1951) 12" Lp 33 rpm albums

Anthologies

- 1923-33 - The Essential Bessie Smith (2xCD) (Columbia/Legacy, 1997)
- 1923-33 - Empress of the Blues (Giants Of Jazz, 1985)
- 1923-33 - The Collection (Columbia, 1989)
- 1928-33 - Blue Spirit Blues (Drive, 1989)

=== 78 RPM singles — Columbia Records ===
A-3844	"Gulf Coast Blues"	1923-02-16
A-3844	"Down Hearted Blues"	1923-02-16
A-3877	"Aggravatin' Papa"	1923-04-11
A-3877	"Beale Street Mama"	1923-04-11
A-3888	"Baby Won't You Please Come Home"	1923-04-11
A-3888	"Oh Daddy Blues"	1923-04-11
A-3898	"Keeps on A Rainin All Time"	1923-02-16
A-3898	"Tain't Nobody's Bizness if I Do"	1923-04-26
A-3900	"Outside of That"	1923-04-30
A-3900	"Mama's Got the Blues"	1923-04-30
A-3936	"Bleeding Hearted Blues"	1923-06-14
A-3936	"Midnight Blues"	1923-06-15
A-3939	"Yodeling Blues"	1923-06-14
A-3939	"Lady Luck Blues"	1923-06-14
A-3942	"If You Don't, I Know Who Will"	1923-06-21
A-3942	"Nobody in Town Can Bake a Jelly Roll Like My Man"	1923-06-22
A-4001	"Jail House Blues"	1923-09-21
A-4001	"Graveyard Dream Blues"	1923-09-26
13000 D	"Whoa, Tillie, Take Your Time"	1923-10-24
13000 D	"My Sweetie Went Away"	1923-10-24
13001 D	"Cemetery Blues"	1923-09-26
13001 D	"Any Woman's Blues"	1923-10-16
13005 D	"St Louis Gal"	1923-09-24
13005 D	"Sam Jones' Blues"	1923-09-24
13007 D	"I'm Going Back to My Used to Be"	1923-10-04
13007 D	"Far Away Blues"	1923-10-04
14000 D	"Mistreatin' Daddy"	1923-12-04
14000 D	"Chicago Bound Blues"	1923-12-04
14005 D	"Frosty Mornin' Blues"	1924-01-08
14005 D	"Easy Come Easy Go Blues"	1924-01-10
14010 D	"Eavesdropper Blues"	1924-01-09
14010 D	"Haunted House Blues"	1924-01-09
14018 D	"Boweavil Blues"	1924-04-07
14018 D	"Moonshine Blues"	1924-04-09
14020 D	"Sorrowful Blues"	1924-04-04
14020 D	"Rocking Chair Blues"	1924-04-04
14023 D	"Frankie Blues"	1924-04-08
14023 D	"Hateful Blues"	1924-04-08
14025 D	"Pinchbacks, Take 'em Away"	1924-04-04
14025 D	"Ticket Agent Easy Your Window Down"	1924-04-05
14031 D	"Louisiana Low Down Blues"	1924-07-22
14031 D	"Mountain Top Blues"	1924-07-22
14032 D	"House Rent Blues"	1924-07-23
14032 D	"Work House Blues"	1924-07-23
14037 D	"Rainy Weather Blues"	1924-08-08
14037 D	"Salt Water Blues"	1924-07-31
14042 D	"Bye Bye Blues"	1924-09-26
14042 D	"Weeping Willow Blues"	1924-09-26
14051 D	"Dying Gambler's Blues"	1924-12-06
14051 D	"Sing Sing Prison Blues"	1924-12-06
14052 D	"Follow the Deal on Down"	1924-12-04
14052 D	"Sinful Blues"	1924-11-11
14056 D	"Reckless Blues"	1925-01-14
14056 D	"Sobbin' Hearted Blues"	1925-01-14
14060 D	"Love Me Daddy Blues"	1924-12-12
14060 D	"Woman's Trouble Blues"	1924-12-12
14064 D	"Cold in Hand Blues"	1925-01-14
14064 D	"St Louis Blues"	1925-01-14
14075 D	"Yellow Dog Blues"	1925-05-06
14075 D	"Soft Pedal Blues"	1925-05-14
14079 D	"Dixie Flyer Blues"	1925-05-15
14079 D	"You've Been a Good Ole Wagon"	1925-01-14
14083 D	"Careless Love"	1925-05-26
14083 D	"He's Gone Blues"	1925-06-23
14090 D	"I Ain't Goin' to Play No Second Fiddle"	1925-05-27
14090 D	"Nashville Women's Blues"	1925-05-27
14095 D	"I Ain't Got Nobody"	1925-08-19
14095 D	"J.C.Holmes Blues"	1925-05-27
14098 D	"My Man Blues"	1925-09-01
14098 D	"Nobody's Blues but Mine"	1925-08-19
14109 D	"Florida Bound Blues"	1925-11-17
14109 D	"New Gulf Coast Blues"	1925-11-17
14115 D	"I've Been Mistreated and I Don't Like It"	1925-11-18
14115 D	"Red Mountain Blues"	1925-11-20
14123 D	"Lonesome Desert Blues"	1925-12-09
14123 D	"Golden Rule Blues"	1925-11-20
14129 D	"What's the Matter Now?"	1926-03-05
14129 D	"I Want Every Bit of It"	1926-03-05
14133 D	"Jazzbo Brown from Memphis Town"	1926-03-18
14133 D	"Squeeze Me"	1926-03-05
14137 D	"Hard Driving Papa"	1926-05-40
14137 D	"Money Blues"	1926-05-04
14147 D	"Baby Doll"	1926-05-04
14147 D	"Them Has Been Blues"	1926-03-05
14158 D	"Lost Your Head Blues"	1926-05-04
14158 D	"Gin House Blues"	1926-03-18
14172 D	"One and Two Blues"	1926-10-26
14172 D	"Honey Man Blues"	1926-10-25
14179 D	"Hard Time Blues"	1926-10-25
14179 D	"Young Woman's Blues"	1926-10-26
14195 D	"Backwater Blues"	1927-02-17
14195 D	"Preachin' the Blues"	1927-02-17
14197 D	"Muddy Water"	1927-03-02
14197 D	"After You've Gone"	1927-03-02
14209 D	"Send Me to the 'Lectric Chair"	1927-03-03
14209 D	"Them's Graveyard Words"	1927-03-03
14219 D	"There'll Be a Hot Time in Old Town Tonight"	1927-03-02
14219 D	"Alexander's Ragtime Band"	1927-03-02
14232 D	"Trombone Cholly"	1927-03-03
14232 D	"Lock and Key Blues"	1927-04-01
14250 D	"A Good Man Is Hard to Find"	1927-09-27
14250 D	"Mean Old Bed Bug Blues"	1927-09-27
14260 D	"Sweet Mistreater"	1927-04-01
14260 D	"Homeless Blues"	1927-09-28
14273 D	"Dyin' by The Hour"	1927-10-27
14273 D	"Foolish Man Blues"	1927-10-27
14292 D	"I Used to Be Your Sweet Mama"	1928-02-09
14292 D	"Thinking Blues"	1928-02-09
14304 D	"I'd Rather be Dead and Buried in my Grave"	1928-06-16
14304 D	"Pickpocket Blues"	1928-02-09
14312 D	"Empty Bed Blues Pt1"	1928-03-20
14312 D	"Empty Bed Blues Pt2"	1928-03-20
14324 D	"Put It Right Here"	1928-03-20
14324 D	"Spider Man Blues"	1928-03-19
14338 D	"It Won't Be You"	1928-02-12
14338 D	"Standin' in The Rain Blues"	1928-02-12
14354 D	"Devil's Gonna Git You"	1928-08-24
14354 D	"Yes Indeed He Do"	1928-08-24
14375 D	"Washwoman's Blues"	1928-08-24
14375 D	"Please Help Me Get Him Off My Mind"	1928-08-24
14384 D	"Me and My Gin"	1928-08-25
14384 D	"Slow and Easy Man"	1928-08-24
14399 D	"Poor Man's Blues"	1928-08-24
14399 D	"You Ought to be Ashamed"	1928-08-24
14427 D	"You've Got to Give Me Some"	1929-05-08
14427 D	"I'm Wild About that Thing"	1929-05-08
14435 D	"My Kitchen Man"	1929-05-08
14435 D	"I've Got What It Takes"	1929-05-15
14451 D	"Nobody Knows You When You're Down and Out"	1929-05-15
14451 D	"Take It Right Back"	1929-07-25
14464 D	"It Makes My Love Come Down"	1929-08-20
14464 D	"He's Got Me Goin'"	1929-08-20
14476 D	"Dirty No Gooder's Blues"	1929-10-01
14476 D	"Wasted Life Blues"	1929-10-01
14487 D	"Don't Cry Baby"	1929-10-11
14487 D	"You Don't Understand"	1929-10-11
14516 D	"New Orleans Hop Scop Blues"	1930-03-27
14516 D	"Keep It to Yourself"	1930-03-27
14527 D	"Blue Spirit Blues"	1929-10-11
14527 D	"Worn out Papa Blues"	1929-10-11
14538 D	"Moan Mourners"	1930-06-09
14538 D	"On Revival Day"	1930-06-09
14554 D	"Hustlin' Dan"	1930-07-22
14554 D	"Black Mountain Blues"	1930-07-22
14569 D	"Hot Springs Blues"	1927-03-03
14569 D	"Lookin' for My Man Blues"	1927-09-28
14611 D	"In the House Blues"	1931-06-11
14611 D	"Blue Blues"	1931-06-11
14634 D	"Safety Mama"	1931-11-20
14634 D	"Need a Little Sugar in My Bowl"	1931-11-20
14663 D	"Long Old Road"	1931-06-11
14663 D	"Shipwreck Blues"	1931-06-11

=== 78 RPM Singles — Okeh Records ===
8945	"I'm Down in the Dumps"	1933-11-24
8945	"Do Your Duty"	1933-11-24
8949	"Take Me for a Buggy Ride"	1933-11-24
8949	"Gimme a Pigfoot (and a Bottle of Beer)"	1933-11-24

=== Hit records ===
There was no official national record chart in the US until 1936. National positions have been formulated post facto by music historian Joel Whitburn.

Year	Single	US Pop (Note: Joel Whitburn's methodology for creating pre-1940s chart positions has been criticized, and those listed here should not be taken as definitive.)
1923	"Downhearted Blues"	1
1923	"Gulf Coast Blues"	5
1923	"Aggravatin' Papa"	12
1923	"Baby Won't You Please Come Home"	6
1923	"T'ain't Nobody's Biz-Ness if I Do"	9
1925	"The St. Louis Blues"	3
1925	"Careless Love Blues"	5
1925	"I Ain't Gonna Play No Second Fiddle"	8
1926	"I Ain't Got Nobody"	8
1926	"Lost Your Head Blues"	5
1927	"After You've Gone"	7
1927	"Alexander's Ragtime Band"	17
1928	"A Good Man Is Hard to Find"	13
1928	"Empty Bed Blues"	20
1929	"Nobody Knows You When You're Down and Out"	15
