= 7 Park Avenue =

Studio album by Pete Ham
- Released: 18 March 1997; 1999 (Japan remaster)
- Recorded: 1967–1975
- Genres: Power pop, blues
- Length: 50:22
- Label: Rykodisc
- Producer: Dan Matovina

Pete Ham chronology
| 7 Park Avenue (1997) | Golders Green (1999) |

Professional ratings
Review scores
| Source | Rating |
|---|---|
| Allmusic | 3.5/5 stars |
| NME | 8/10 |

7 Park Avenue is the first of four posthumous CD releases of demo material recorded by Badfinger's Pete Ham. The recordings are taken from various eras, beginning with compositions he wrote during his years with The Iveys from 1967 to 1969, and running throughout his tenure with Badfinger, ending with his suicide in 1975. The majority of these recordings were made on The Iveys' Sound-On-Sound Revox mono tape machine. Many of the songs highlight Ham playing all the instruments. However, session musicians occasionally augment some of the tracks, most notably former Badfinger member Bob Jackson and former Iveys member, Ron Griffiths. All of the vocals and guitar licks are Ham's original performances.

A follow-up disc of Ham demo material, Golders Green, was released two years after this release.

7 Park Avenue was the address of Badfinger's band residence in Golders Green. Golders Green is a suburb of London, England, probably most known for the Golders Green Crematorium which is the final resting place for many famous Britons including The Who drummer Keith Moon, famed psychoanalyst Sigmund Freud, and comedic actor Peter Sellers, star of the 1960s Pink Panther movies.

The following track listing represents the US and UK issues. The Japanese CD issue contains five bonus tracks here. In addition, the Japanese edition was remastered for its second pressing in 1999.

== Track listing ==
All songs written by Pete Ham.

| No. | Title | Length |
|---|---|---|
| 1. | "Catherine Cares" | 3:01 |
| 2. | "Coppertone Blues" | 3:56 |
| 3. | "It Doesn't Really Matter" | 2:58 |
| 4. | "Live Love All of Your Days" | 2:16 |
| 5. | "Would You Deny" | 1:23 |
| 6. | "Dear Father" | 2:03 |
| 7. | "Matted Spam" | 3:24 |
| 8. | "No Matter What" | 2:24 |
| 9. | "Leaving on a Midnight Train" | 2:41 |
| 10. | "Weep Baby" | 2:26 |
| 11. | "Hand in Hand" | 2:38 |
| 12. | "Sille Veb" | 3:38 |
| 13. | "I Know That You Should" | 3:28 |
| 14. | "Island" | 2:27 |
| 15. | "Just Look Inside the Cover" | 3:29 |
| 16. | "Just How Lucky We Are" | 2:29 |
| 17. | "No More" | 2:55 |
| 18. | "Ringside" | 2:46 |

Japanese Bonus Tracks
| No. | Title | Length |
|---|---|---|
| 19. | "Just a Chance" |
| 20. | "The Heart That Can't Be Understood" |
| 21. | "Come Come Tomorrow" |
| 22. | "Blessing in Disguise" |
| 23. | "Know One Knows" |
