= Golders Green (album) =

Studio album by Pete Ham
- Released: 13 July 1999
- Recorded: 1968–1975
- Genre: Power pop
- Length: Approx 42 minutes
- Label: Rykodisc
- Producer: Dan Matovina

Pete Ham chronology
7 Park Avenue (1997)	Golders Green (1999)	Keyhole Street: Demos 1966–67 (2013)

Professional ratings
Review scores
Source	Rating
Allmusic	3.5/5 stars

Golders Green is the second posthumous CD release of demo material recorded by Badfinger frontman Pete Ham. The recordings are taken from various eras, beginning with compositions he wrote during his years with The Iveys in 1968 and 1969, and running throughout his tenure with Badfinger, ending with his suicide in 1975.

== Contents ==
Most or all of the original recordings were made on Ham's home Revox two-track tape machine, with some remainders apparently recorded in professional studios and transferred to his home machine. Most or all of the original recordings highlight Ham playing all of the instruments. In cases where the instrumentation was sparse, session musicians were utilised to enhance the recordings. Notably, Badfinger member Bob Jackson later added keyboards to some tracks, and Iveys member Ron Griffiths added some bass guitar.

Due to decades of neglect and improper storage, the original tapes were greatly deteriorated and had to be digitally transferred before the disc was made. An earlier collection of Ham demo material, 7 Park Avenue, was released two years prior to this release.

7 Park Avenue was the address of Badfinger's band residence in Golders Green. Golders Green is a community within London, England probably most known for the Golders Green Crematorium which is the final resting place for many famous Britons including The Who drummer Keith Moon, famed psychoanalyst Sigmund Freud, and comedic actor Peter Sellers, star of the 1960s Pink Panther (film) movies.

The following track listing represents the US and UK issues. A subsequent Japanese CD issue contains two bonus tracks listed below.

== Track listing ==
All songs written by Pete Ham, except tracks 4 and 10, written by Pete Ham and Tom Evans.

1. "Makes Me Feel Good" – 1:47
2. "A Lonely Day" – 1:59
3. "Dawn" – 3:18
4. "Without You" – 2:16
5. "Pete's Walk" – 1:27
6. "Hurry on Father" – 1:38
7. "Goodbye John Frost" – 1:59
8. "I'll Kiss You Goodnight" – 2:37
9. "When the Feeling" – 0:55
10. "Shine On" – 0:39
11. "Gonna Do It" – 0:22
12. "Whiskey Man" – 1:34
13. "Keyhole Street" – 2:27
14. "I've Waited So Long to Be Free" – 1:41
15. "Richard" – 3:10
16. "Midnight Caller" – 2:42
17. "Helping Hand" – 3:52
18. "Where Will You Be" – 1:58
19. "I'm So Lonely" – 3:13
20. "Makes Me Feel Good" – 2:04

Japanese bonus tracks

21. "Piano Red" - 4:57
22. "Evening Sky" - 2:25
