= Bob Jackson (musician) =

English musician

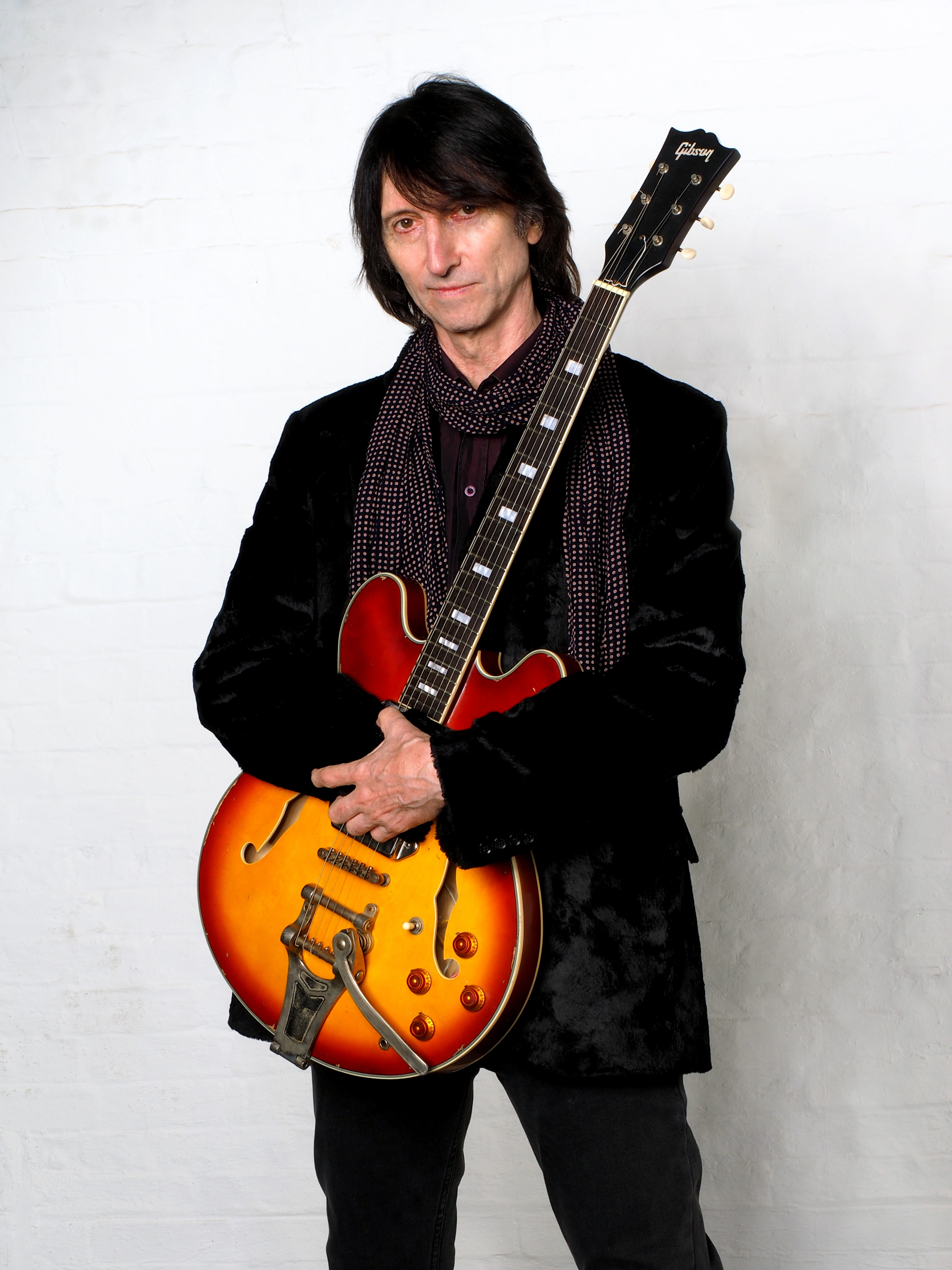
- Jackson in 2015

Background information
- Born: Robert Jackson; 6 January 1949 (age 77); Coventry, England
- Genre: Rock
- Occupations: Singer; songwriter
- Instruments: Piano; guitar; vocals
- Labels: Neon; RSO; Epic; Sire; Creole; Snapper
- Website: http://www.badfingeruk.com/

Robert Jackson (born 6 January 1949) is an English rock musician most famous for being a member of Badfinger from 1974–75 and 1981–83, and of the Fortunes from 1995–2019. He currently tours under the name Badfinger in the United Kingdom.

== Career ==
Jackson's first band, Indian Summer, was formed in 1969. They released one album in 1971. In 1972, Bob was the keyboardist for the band "Rigor Mortis", led by John Entwistle of the Who. Jackson joined Badfinger, after Pete Ham had a three-week hiatus from the band due to problems surrounding and manager Kathie Molland, wife of Badfinger guitarist Joey Molland. Ham returned after the three weeks off in time for a tour, and Jackson remained in the band as a full-time keyboardist.

Jackson was in Badfinger from 1974 to April 1975, when the band ended following the suicide of Pete Ham aged 27. Jackson did return in a new version of the band led by Tom Evans in 1982. Evans and Jackson became part of a group called the Dodgers. They released three British singles on Island Records in 1976. "Don't Let Me Be Wrong" was the act's only US release, but failed to chart.

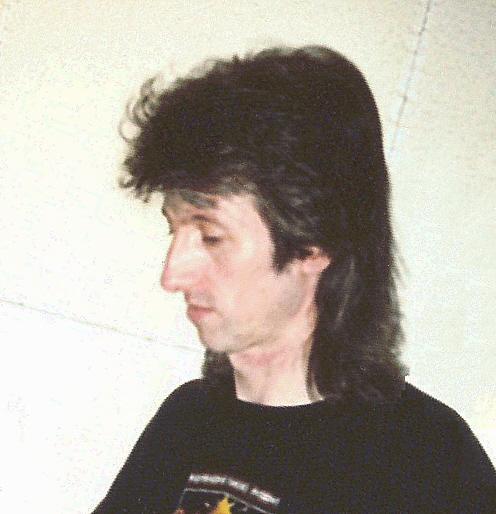
Jackson in 1990

In 1995, Jackson joined the Fortunes. In 2015, Jackson formed his own version of Badfinger with current members Andy Nixon, Michael Healey, and Ted Duggan to honour the memory of Pete Ham, Tom Evans, and Mike Gibbins and undertook a 23 date UK theatre tour, playing to over 20,000 people.

In September 2019, Jackson was severely ill in the hospital for six months, and was replaced by rotating musicians during his time off. He ultimately decided to step down from the group; he had been the keyboardist for the Fortunes for nearly 25 years.

== Discography ==
- Indian Summer by Indian Summer, 1971
- Moon by Moon 1973
- Ross by Ross, 1973
- The Pit and the Pendulum by Ross, 1974
- Head First by Badfinger, recorded 1974 (released 2000)
- Love on the Rebound by The Dodgers, 1978
- The Searchers by The Searchers, 1979
- Play for Today by The Searchers, 1980
- On the Rocks by The Byron Band, 1981
- Spend My Nights in Armour by Pete Brown (with Jeff Beck & Jack Bruce), 1987
- 7 Park Avenue by Pete Ham (released 1997)
- Golders Green by Pete Ham (released 1999)
- Some Bridges by The Fortunes, 1999
- The Fortunes...Live by The Fortunes, 2001
- Heroes Never Die by The Fortunes, 2004
- Play On by The Fortunes, 2008

== Sources ==
- Matovina, Dan (2000). Without You: The Tragic Story of "Badfinger". Frances Glover Books. ISBN 978-0-9657122-2-4.
- Simmonds, Jeremy (2008). The Encyclopedia of Dead Rock Stars: Heroin, Handguns, and Ham Sandwiches. Chicago Review Press. ISBN 978-1-55652-754-8.
