= Charlie Green (trombonist) =

American jazz trombonist

- Also known as: Long Boy; Big Green
- Born: Charles Green; 1893; Omaha, Nebraska, United States
- Died: November 27, 1935 (aged 41–42) New York City, United States
- Genres: Jazz
- Occupations: Musician
- Instruments: Trombone

Charles Green (1893 – November 27, 1935) was an American jazz musician, who was born in Omaha, Nebraska, and died in New York City. He was one of the early jazz trombonists and the soloist in the Fletcher Henderson orchestra (joining slightly before Louis Armstrong).

== Biography ==
He played locally in Omaha between 1920 and 1923, before his two stints with Henderson (July 1924 and April 1926; and late 1928 to early 1929). Described as "a superior blues player who could also swing fairly early", Green played on several Bessie Smith recordings, notably "Trombone Cholly" featuring his trombone and biographical lyrics praising his playing, and the notorious "Empty Bed Blues" which features the "dirty moaning" of his playing.

Green also recorded in the 1920s with several other blues singers, and worked with the bands of Benny Carter (1929–1931 and 1933), Chick Webb (several times during 1930-1934), Jimmie Noone (1931), Don Redman (1932) and at the end with Kaiser Marshall. In 1928, Green played in the orchestra of the revue Keep Shufflin' together with Fats Waller and James P. Johnson.

According to jazz historian John Chilton (in his book Who's Who of Jazz) Green's premature death was from passing out on his doorstep in Harlem on a cold February night after having been unable to get into his home, and thus freezing to death. This story was disputed by Frederick J. Spencer, M.D., in his book Jazz and Death, Medical Profiles of Jazz Greats.

A folk song, known by various names, was recorded as "Charley Green, Play That Slide Trombone", by Jim Croce and appears on the albums Facets (1966) and The Faces I've Been (1975). It has also been performed and recorded by Bessie Smith (as "Trombone Cholly"), Hoyt Axton and the Chicago area folksinger, Jim Craig.

== Bibliography ==
- John Chilton, Who's Who of Jazz (5th edition, London 1989), ISBN 978-0826472342
- Brian Rust, Jazz Records 1897-1942 (5th edition, Chigwell, Essex 1983), ISBN 0902391046
