= Pete Ham =

Welsh musician (1947–1975)

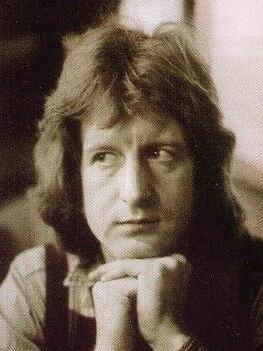
- Ham in 1974

Background information
- Born: Peter William Ham; 27 April 1947; Swansea, Wales
- Died: 24 April 1975 (aged 27) Woking, Surrey, England
- Genres: Rock; power pop; pop
- Occupations: Musician; songwriter
- Instruments: Vocals; guitar; piano
- Years active: 1961–1975
- Labels: Apple; Warner Bros. Records; Rykodisc
- Formerly of: Badfinger; The Iveys
- Partner: Anne Herriot
- Website: www.badfingersite.com/badfinger-bios/pete-ham/

Peter William Ham (27 April 1947 – 24 April 1975) was a Welsh musician and songwriter who was the lead vocalist and composer of the rock band Badfinger from 1961 until his death in 1975. He also co-wrote the ballad "Without You", a worldwide No. 1 hit for Harry Nilsson that has become a standard covered by hundreds of artists. Ham was granted two Ivor Novello Awards related to the song in 1973.

Ham died by suicide in 1975 at the age of 27 after Badfinger was financially ruined by their manager Stan Polley.

== Early life ==
Peter William Ham was born in Swansea, Wales. The youngest child of William and Catherine (maiden name Tanner) Ham, he had three siblings, John (1937–2015), Irene (1943–1991), and William (born 1935), who died during infancy. William was born in 1908 and worked as a ship painter at the Swansea docks; he died in 1985. Catherine was born in 1912 and worked as a plate opener in the tinplate works; she died in 1976, a year after Peter.

Ham grew up in Gwent Gardens, at the foot of the Townhill estate. He attended Gors Junior School, and showed early signs of musical talent. He frequently played harmonica on the school playground. His older brother John was a jazz trumpeter, and encouraged young Ham to enter the Swansea music scene. One of Pete's first jobs was as an apprentice television and radio engineer.

== Career ==
He formed a local rock group called The Panthers circa 1961. This group would undergo several name and line-up changes before it became The Iveys in 1965. In 1968, The Iveys came to the attention of Mal Evans (The Beatles' personal assistant) and were eventually signed to the Beatles' Apple Records label after approval from all four Beatles, who were reportedly impressed by the band's songwriting abilities.

The Iveys changed their name to Badfinger with the single release of "Come and Get It", a composition written by Paul McCartney that became a worldwide Top 10 hit.

Ham had initially protested against using a non-original to promote the band, as he had gained confidence in the group's compositions, but he was quickly convinced of the springboard effect of having a likely hit single. His own creative perseverance paid off eventually, as his "No Matter What" became another Top 10 worldwide hit in late 1970. He followed up with two more worldwide hits in "Day After Day" and "Baby Blue".

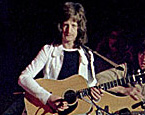
Ham at the Concert for Bangladesh, 1971

Ham's greatest songwriting success came with his co-written composition with bandmate Tom Evans called "Without You" – a worldwide No. 1 hit when it was later covered by Harry Nilsson and released in 1971. The song has since become a standard and has been covered by hundreds of singers, most notably Mariah Carey who made it a worldwide hit again in 1994. An Ivor Novello award for Song of the Year was issued in 1973 along with Grammy nominations. George Harrison used Ham's talents for a number of album sessions, including on the All Things Must Pass album and for other Apple Records artist's recordings. This friendship culminated with Ham's acoustic guitar duet on "Here Comes the Sun" with Harrison at The Concert for Bangladesh in 1971, documented in the theatrical film of the concert. In 1972, Badfinger was picked up by Warner Bros. Records, as the Apple Records label was crumbling and it seemed the band was primed for major recognition.

Warner Bros. Records sued Badfinger's business manager Stan Polley after an advance vanished. With their current album suddenly withdrawn and their follow-up rejected, Badfinger spent the early months of 1975 trying to figure out how to proceed under the unclear legal situation. Their March 1975 salary cheques did not clear, and the April cheques never arrived. Panic set in, especially for Ham, who had recently bought a £30,000 house in Woking, Surrey, and whose girlfriend was expecting a child. According to 1974–75 bandmate Bob Jackson, the band tried to continue without Polley's involvement by contacting booking agents and prospective managers throughout London, but they were routinely declined because of their restrictive contracts with Polley and impending legal actions. Ham reportedly tried on many occasions to contact Polley by telephone during the early months of 1975, but he was never able to reach him.

== Personal life ==
Ham was in a relationship with Anne Ferguson, who was eight months pregnant at the time of his suicide. They both lived in Surrey. Ham's only child, a daughter called Petera, was born after his death. She lives in Glasgow, Scotland, as of 2013. In 2000, Anne and Tom Evans' widow, with Gibbins and Collins, went to court to pursue unpaid royalties.

== Death ==
On the night of 23 April 1975, Ham received a phone call from the United States, telling him that all his money had disappeared. Later that night, he met Tom Evans and they went to The White Hart Pub in Surrey together, where Ham drank ten whiskies. Evans drove him home at three o'clock on the morning of 24 April 1975.

Ham, aged 27, hanged himself in his garage studio in Woking later that morning. His suicide note – addressed to his girlfriend Anne Ferguson and her son Blair – blamed Polley for much of his despair and inability to cope with his disappointments in life. The note read:

Anne, I love you. Blair, I love you. I will not be allowed to love and trust everybody. This is better. Pete. P.S. Stan Polley is a soulless bastard. I will take him with me.

Ham had shown growing signs of mental illness over the preceding months, with Gibbins remembering Ham burning his hands and arms with cigarettes. Ham was cremated at the Morriston Crematorium, Swansea; his ashes were spread in the memorial gardens. Ham's daughter, Petera, was born one month after his death. In May, Warner Bros. terminated its contract with Badfinger, and Badfinger dissolved. Around that time, Apple also deleted all of Badfinger's albums from its catalogue.

== Legacy ==
Ham is often credited as being one of the earliest purveyors of the power pop genre. His most widespread effect in popular music was with the ballad "Without You", which he wrote with Badfinger bandmate Tom Evans. Collections of Ham's home demo recordings have been released posthumously: 1997's 7 Park Avenue, 1999's Golders Green, and 2013's The Keyhole Street Demos 1966–67. In 2022 Ham's "Demos Variety Pack" was released.

=== Blue plaque ===
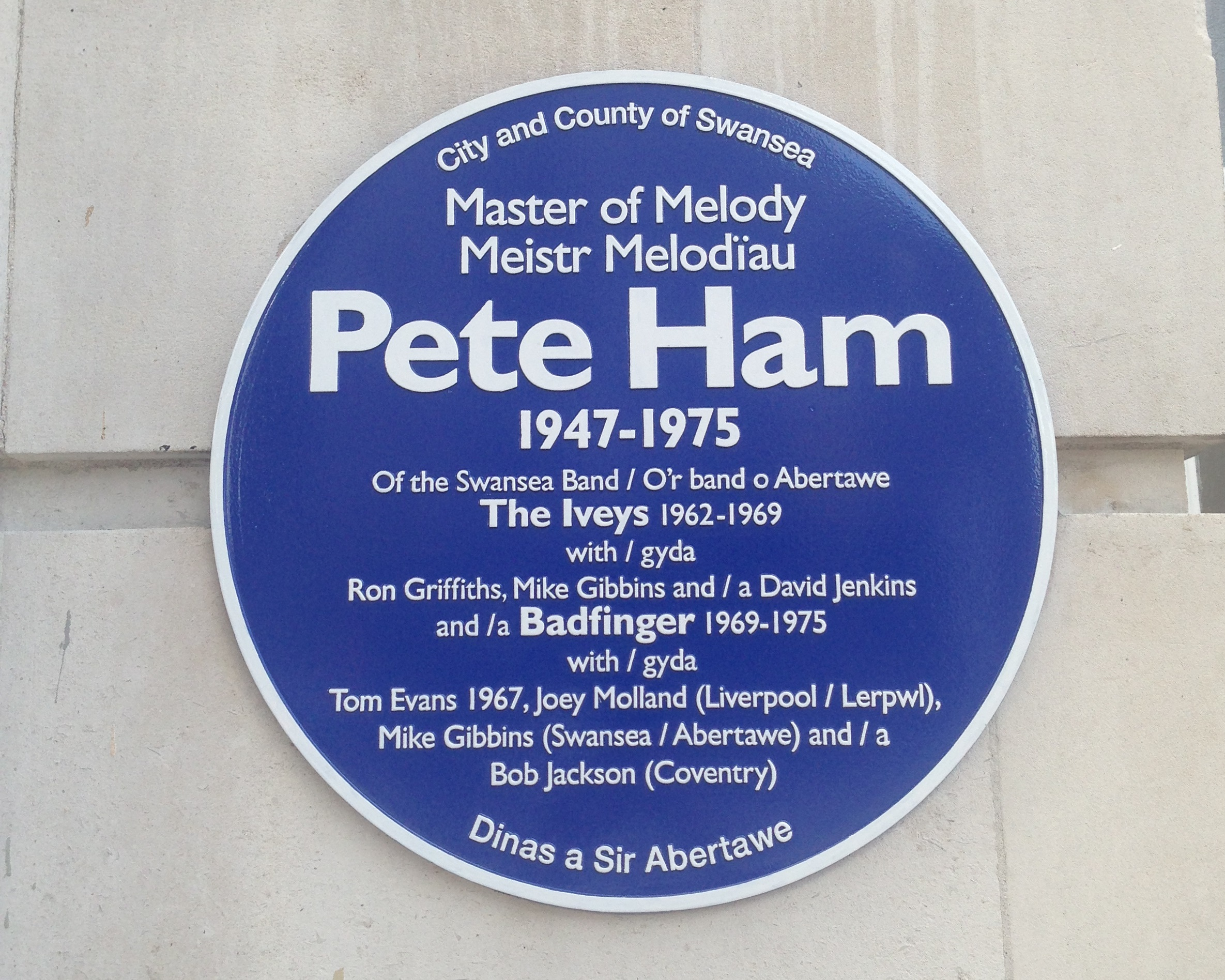
Blue plaque commemorating Pete Ham in Swansea

On 27 April 2013 (what would have been Ham's 66th birthday), a blue plaque was unveiled by Swansea City Council to honour him in his hometown. The unveiling was attended by two former members of the original Badfinger band, The Iveys: Ron Griffiths and David Jenkins, plus former Badfinger member Bob Jackson. The plaque honoured Ham and all the Iveys and Badfinger members of his lifetime. The ceremony was followed by a concert featuring former Badfinger members Bob Jackson and Al Wodtke.

The plaque was attached to the exterior of Swansea railway station because of its proximity to the adjacent Ivey Place where the band would meet to practice.

This inscription, in English and Welsh, reads:

Master of Melody
Meistr Melodiau
Pete Ham
1947–1975
Of the Swansea band / O'r band o Abertawe
The Iveys 1962–1969
with / gyda
Ron Griffiths, Mike Gibbins and / a David Jenkin
and / a Badfinger 1969–1975
with / gyda
Tom Evans 1967, Joey Molland (Liverpool / Lerpwl),
Mike Gibbins (Swansea / Abertawe) and / a
Bob Jackson (Coventry)
Dinas a Sir Abertawe

== Discography ==
The Iveys

- Maybe Tomorrow (1969)

Badfinger

- Magic Christian Music (1970)
- No Dice (1970)
- Straight Up (1971)
- Ass (1973)
- Badfinger (1974)
- Wish You Were Here (1974)
- Head First (2000, recorded in 1974)
- Head First (2024, recorded in 1974)

Solo

- 7 Park Avenue (1997)
- Golders Green (1999)
- The Keyhole Street Demos 1966–67 (2013)
- No, Don't Let It Go/You're Such a Good Woman (2013 - single)
- Demos Variety Pack (2022 - demos compilation)
- Misunderstood (2023)
- Gwent Gardens (2023)
- Acoustic (2025 Record Store Day )

Guest artist

- The Concert for Bangladesh (the concert, the album, and the film)
- All Things Must Pass by George Harrison (album)
- "It Don't Come Easy" by Ringo Starr (single)
- "Try Some, Buy Some" by George Harrison (single)
- Living in the Material World (uncredited) by George Harrison (album)

== Charted singles ==
- "No Matter What" (Billboard charting No. 8 by Badfinger)
- "Without You" (Billboard charting No. 1 by Harry Nilsson, No. 3 by Mariah Carey, No. 28 by Clay Aiken).
- "Day After Day" (Billboard charting No. 4, Cash Box charting No. 1, both by Badfinger)
- "Baby Blue" (Billboard charting No. 14 by Badfinger)

== See also ==
- 27 Club, of which Ham is a member

== Sources ==
- Blake, John (1981). All You Needed Was Love: The Beatles After The Beatles. Perigee Books. ISBN 978-0-399-50556-0.
- Jones, David (2001). The Beatles and Wales: The Long and Winding Road. St. David's Press. ISBN 978-1-902719-09-2.
- Katz, Gary J. (1997). Badfinger (AC-3, Colour, DVD-Video, Special Edition, NTSC). US and Canada: Geneon Universal Entertainment. 6304676999.
- Matovina, Dan (2000). Without You: The Tragic Story of "Badfinger". Frances Glover Books. ISBN 978-0-9657122-2-4.
- Simmonds, Jeremy (2008). The Encyclopedia of Dead Rock Stars: Heroin, Handguns, and Ham Sandwiches. Chicago Review Press. ISBN 978-1-55652-754-8.
- Valentine, Jack (2006). Motley Rock Stories. Xulon Press. ISBN 978-1-60034-774-0.
