= Empty Bed Blues =

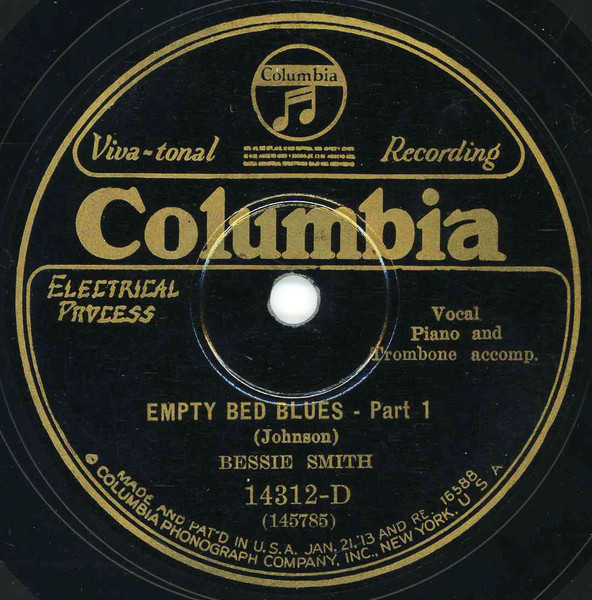

Single by Bessie Smith
- Recorded: March 20, 1928
- Genre: Blues
- Length: 6:19 (Parts 1 & 2)
- Label: Columbia
- Songwriter(s): J. C. Johnson

"Empty Bed Blues" is a 1928 "dirty blues" song written by J. C. Johnson and first recorded by Bessie Smith.

Bessie Smith recorded the song in New York on March 20, 1928. The accompanying musicians were Porter Grainger (piano) and Charlie Green (trombone). The recording was issued by Columbia Records. In 1983, Smith's recording was inducted to the Grammy Hall of Fame.

The song was "the most notorious recording of [Smith's] career". The lyrics are "full of sexual innuendos", and contain numerous oblique references to penetrative sex, in its references to "grinding" coffee, as well as to "bacon" and "cabbage"; and to cunnilingus ("He's a deep-sea diver, with a stroke that can't go wrong/ He can touch the bottom, and his wind holds out so long").

The song was later recorded by artists including Della Reese (1959), Judy Henske (1963), Bette Midler (1977), and Maria Muldaur (2007).

The original lyrics and music of the song entered the public domain in the United States in 2024.
