= Indian Summer (British band) =

British progressive rock band

Indian Summer were a British progressive rock band in the early 1970s.

== History ==
The quartet was formed in Coventry, UK, in 1969. Members were Malcolm Harker on bass, Paul Hooper on drums, Bob Jackson on keyboards and lead vocals and Colin Williams on guitar.

Their manager was Jim Simpson who was managing Black Sabbath at the time. Simpson signed Indian Summer with the same production team to record their first and only album. This self-titled album (Indian Summer) was released two and a half years later, in March 1971. Indian Summer disbanded in the beginning of 1972.

== Indian Summer (1971) ==
=== Track listing ===
==== Side one ====
1. "God is the Dog" – 6:38
2. "Emotions of Men" – 5:44
3. "Glimpse" – 6:45
4. "Half Changed Again" – 6:27

==== Side two ====
1. "Black Sunshine" – 5:25
2. "From the Film of the Same Name" – 5:53
3. "Secrets Reflected" – 6:50
4. "Another Tree Will Grow" – 6:06

All tracks written by Indian Summer Recorded and mixed at Trident Studios, London
Album designed by Keef
Producer: Rodger Bain for Big Bear, Birmingham
Engineer: Robin Cable
Label: Neon Records (a RCA subsidiary)

=== Re-release ===
Released on CD in the nineties and subsequently a remastered version in 2010, by Repertoire Records, Germany. In between these releases, a release by Akarma, Italy, both CD and vinyl.

=== Unreleased and Live LP ===
In 2016 Record Collector magazine unearthed several unreleased Indian Summer songs (along with an alternative version of "God is the Dog"). Along with these studio recording a live recording was added, consisting of 7 of the 8 tracks from the eponymous album. This was released as a limited edition (of 500) double vinyl gatefold package. Confusingly this new release was also called "Indian Summer". The track list is:

== Indian Summer (2016) ==
=== Track listing ===
==== Side one ====
1. "God is the Dog"
2. "Everyman"
3. "The Fox"
4. "Firewater"

==== Side two ====
1. "Walking on Water"
2. "Without You"
3. "Walking on Down the Road"
4. "God is the Dog" (live)

=== Side three ===
1. "Secrets Reflected" (live)
2. "Black Sunshine" (live)
3. "From the Film of the Same Name" (live)

=== Side four ===
1. "Half Changed Again" (live)
2. "Another Tree Will Grow" (live)
3. "Glimpse" (live)
