= L'Été indien (TV program) =

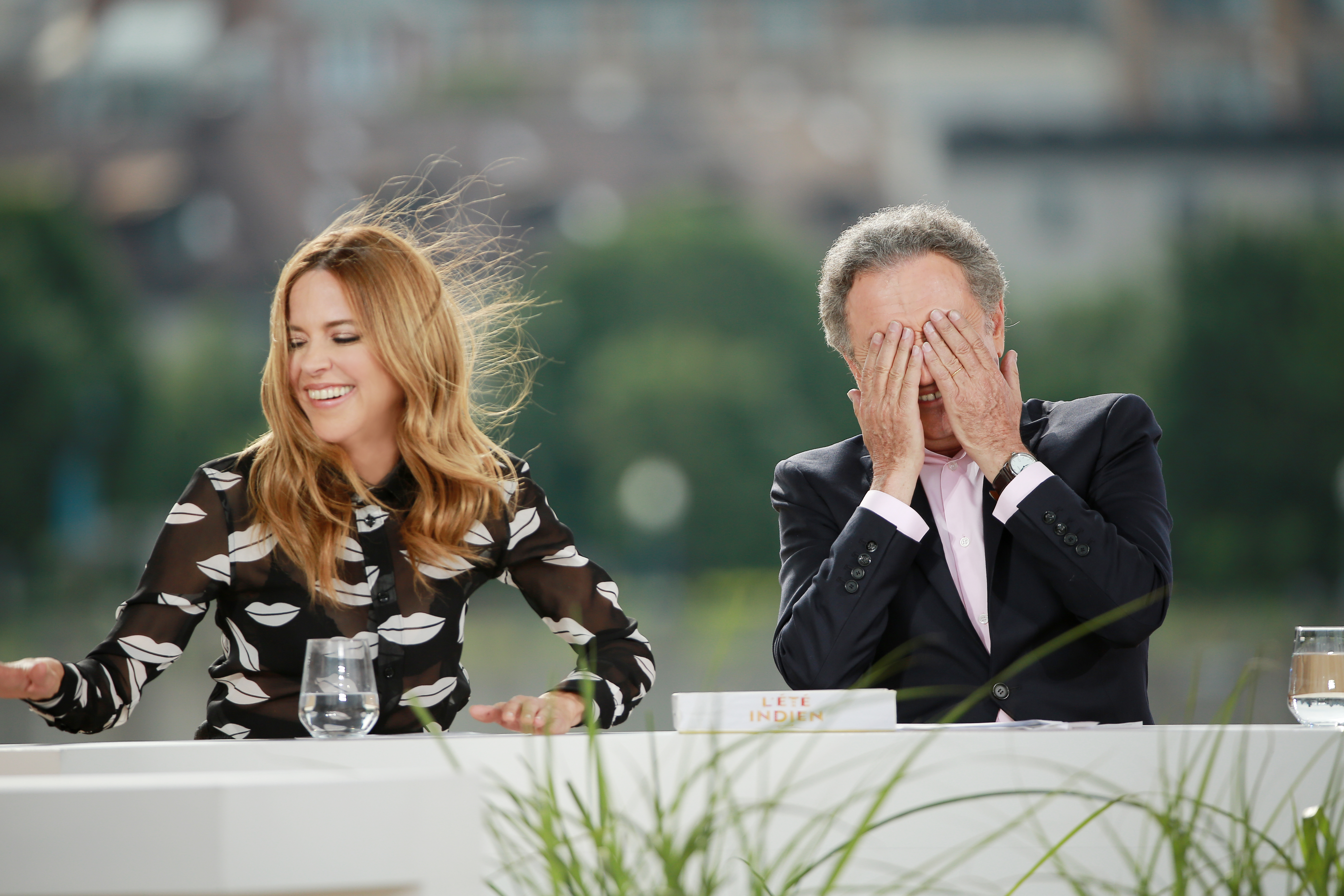
- Julie Snyder and Michel Drucker in 2010
- Genre: Talk-show
- Directed by: Jean Lamoureux
- Presented by: Julie Snyder
- Country of origin: Canada
- Original language: French

Production
- Running time: 90 minutes

Original release
- Network: TVA; France 2
- Release: 2014 – 2014

L'Été indien (French, 'Indian summer') is a 2014 television program from Quebec, Canada that was presented by Michel Drucker and Julie Snyder. It was recorded in Old Montreal, and was broadcast in France on France 2, in Quebec on TVA and internationally on TV5Monde.
