= Indian Summer (EP) =

- Original pressing cover in black ink. The cover was also pressed with other inks such as beige or white.

EP by Indian Summer
- Released: 1993
- Studios: House of Faith, California, United States
- Genres: Emo; post-hardcore; screamo
- Length: 14:39
- Label: Repercussion

Indian Summer chronology
Indian Summer (1993)	Current / Indian Summer (1993)

Indian Summer is the self-titled debut EP by American emo band Indian Summer. It was released in 1993 through Repercussion Recordings. After brothers Adam and Seth Nanaa's band Sinker dissolved, they started a new band and recorded songs for their EP at Bart Thurber's recording studio. The EP is an emo and post-hardcore release, containing three songs with a rhythmic structure that alternates from quiet spoken-word vocals to a loud sound.

After the release, the band would release three more splits and appear in three compilations before breaking up. Despite the obscurity of the release at the time, the EP's track "Woolworm" has seen acclaim from critics for its emotional intensity. "Woolworm" was named as the 19th greatest emo song of all time by Vulture. All three tracks were included in the compilations Science 1994 by Future Recordings and Giving Birth To Thunder by The Numero Group.

== Background ==
After the disbandment of Adam Nanna and Seth Nanna's previous emo band, Sinker, the brothers decided to create a new band called Indian Summer. The brothers recruited drummer Dan Bradley, who also previously drummed for Sinker, and guitarist Marc Bianchi, a friend of Seth who was also in other bands. The band decided to followed a pattern for their songs of alternating a quiet tune with spoken-word vocals and a loud sound with aggressive vocals akin to screamo.

The band members started to create a five-song music set featuring, "Aren't You, Angel," "mm." "Woolworm," "Reflections on Milkweed," and "Orchard." However, due to commitment issues, Dan Bradley left Indian Summer due to the rigorous practice schedule it demanded. The band only recorded and released one song at a rehearsal of the set with Bradley, "Orchard." Adam panned the recording due to it being recorded on a 8-track cassette, as he believed it made it "completely fucked." Despite the quality of the recording, the band would keep the recording and later release the track on a split with Current. Eyad Kaileh, a drummer recommended by Marc Bianchi, replaced Bradley. The quartet improved the four remaining songs on the list and decided to record immediately. They decided to record at Bart Thurber's House of Faith.

== Production ==
"Indian Summer - Woolworm"
A 30-second sample of the song "Woolworm." In this sample, the song transitions from a quiet to a louder sound for the climax. The music is initially very calm suddenly shifts to a much more aggressive sound that is similar to post-hardcore.

At the session, the band incorporated excerpts of Bessie Smith's song "See if I'll Care" in the background of their recordings. Adam Nanaa stumbled over the vinyl in a junkyard. He said that he added the excerpts because it would "emulate the nights in Oakland we spent fucked up" and "passed out with the needle dragging the end of the Slint LP." A later song of the band's, "I Think Your Train Is Leaving", also samples a song by Smith, specifically "Long Old Road". Additionally, the band included intentional vinyl noise in the EP.

During the recording of the EPs, all the songs were first takes at the studio. The recording session was considered chaotic according to Seth Nanaa, who said how they were acting like it was a concert. The group was surprised to know how the recording came out, describing it as "crisp and clean" despite the out-of-control performance and cheap instruments that were used. The signature song from that studio recording, "Woolworm," is about coming from a dysfunctional family. It alludes to Adam and Seth's confrontation with their father's departure before they were born.

My brother and I came from dysfunction. That’s what we knew, I didn’t know shit about politics, so why would I sing about that? My old man bailed on us when we were right out of the womb. When you start screaming ‘I am the angry son,’ it’s hard to read that any other way.

— Adam Nanaa, explaining the meaning of the song "Woolworm"

They selected three songs, "Woolworm," "Aren't You, Angel," and "mm." to be distributed in their debut EP. The remaining song, "Reflections on Milkweed," was released on a compilation titled Food Not Bombs Benefit on *inchworm. records.

== Release ==
For financial and aesthetic reasons, the EP by the band was designed with a minimalist approach. To reduce costs, The band distributed and manufactured the material by themselves under the label Repercussion with the band's apartment serving as a base for assembling the 7-inch record. The album cover only contains a pitchfork and the band's name on the root beer-colored front cover and an image of the boy looking onto a field on the back cover along with snippets of lyrics and gibberish. Adam Nanaa said that they wanted the aesthetic to be minimalistic like other punk bands yet unique. The cover for the pitchfork was a stick that was resting in the tom hole of a bass drum.

I always thought there was a lot of limitations in what people were doing with cover art in punk rock. I didn’t want to make another 7" with a folded over piece of paper as the cover. I took [a] stick home from practice one day and put it on the Xerox machine. It spit out onto the tray and I looked at it and said, ‘fucking brilliant.’

— Adam Nanaa, explaining the process of creating the album cover.

The band intentionally released their EP without a track listing initially. On tour setlists, they usually placed hieroglyphs of many items such as guns, planes, angels, and stars to identify the songs. This intention was an artistic approach from the band because their live performances often diverged from the release of the EP and sounded unalike. Adam Nanna said that they let their live performances transcended from one part of the set to another and how by the end of the performance, it was just one long song. For instance, the track "Woolworm" was often referred to by fans as "Sleeping" or "Angry Son" by fans before it was officially named. In a discography reissued by The Numero Group, names for the tracks were released.

== Reception and legacy ==
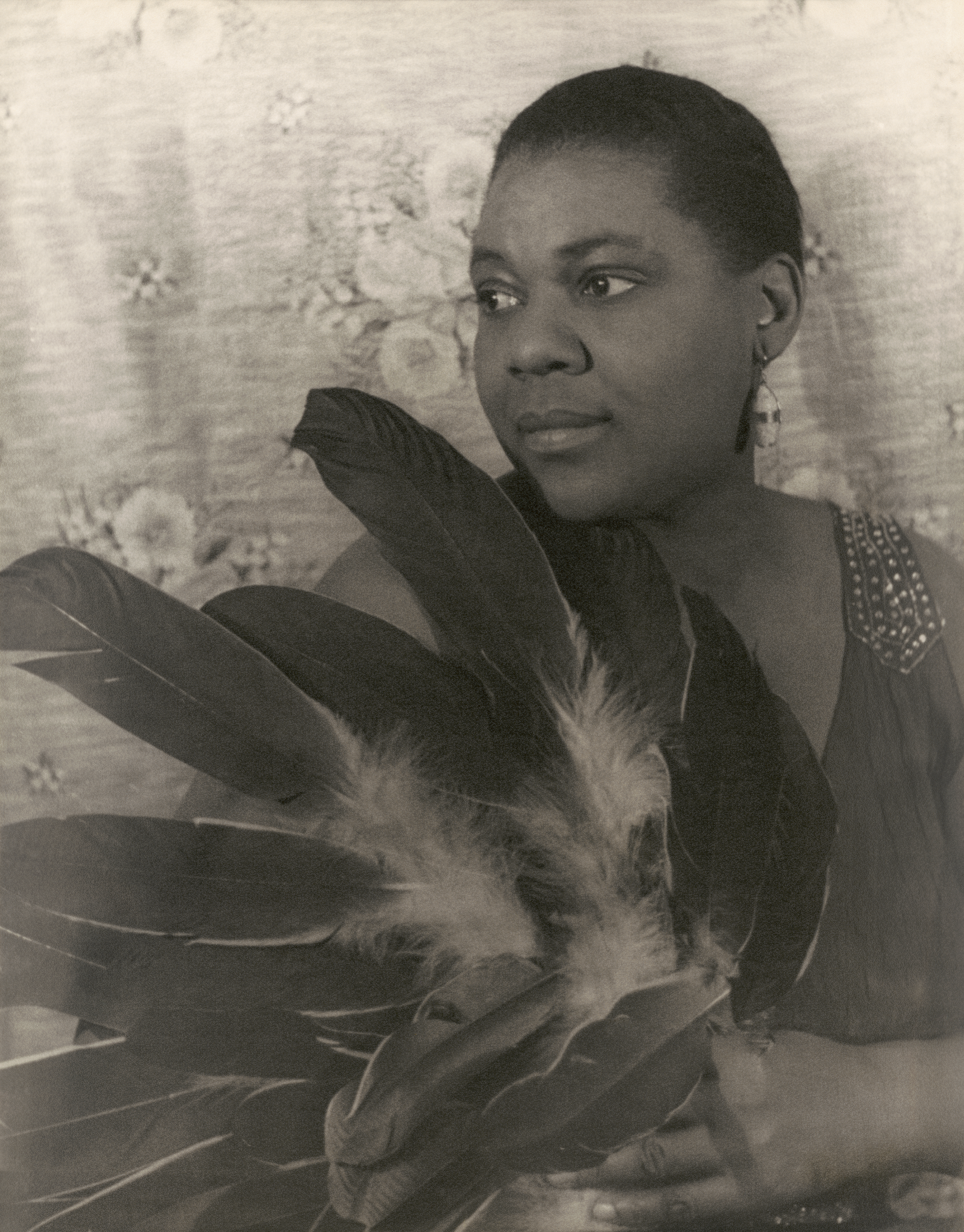
Bessie Smith in 1936. The samples of her song "See If I'll Care" being used by Indian Summer was received positively by critics.

The release did not see much attention from critics when it was originally released but was seen positively in local music communities, establishing themselves in the emo scene. Mark Pearsall's label, Slave Cut, invited the band to contribute a track to the emo compilation Ghost Dance which included early recordings of influential emo bands Cap'n Jazz and Braid. Over time, the EP was pressed approximately 3,000 times. The track "Woolworm" had moderate airplay a year after its release at Stanford University's radio station KZSU to promote their performance on May 25, 1994, for KZSU's Wednesday Night Live. (Note: KZSU named the track I Am The Angry Son instead of Woolworm on their charts)

Despite the obscurity of the release at the time, the EP, especially "Woolworm," has generally been seen positively after it saw more recognition when it was released in their discography compilations Science 1994 and Giving Birth to Thunder. Pitchfork, in their review of Giving Birth to Thunder, called the excerpts of Bessie Smith's voice "the binding agent" of the EP and how "their defining moments are like a flash flood." Rolling Stone named the compilation Science 1994 as one of the greatest emo albums, saying the band was known "for its striking contrasts," noting how that "every minute of calm reaps a subsequent avalanche of havoc." It also noted how Smith's excerpts underpinned "the cathartic swing and crash" of Woolworm. Vulture named "Woolworm" as the 19th greatest emo song of all time. (Note: Vulture uses the unofficial track name Angry Son in their article)

== Track listing ==
All music by Indian Summer. The EP's tracks had no official name at the time of its release. The names of these tracks are from the compilation Giving Birth To Thunder by The Numero Group.

Side A
No.	Title	Length
1.	"Aren't You, Angel?"	4:44
2.	"mm."	2:28

Side B
No.	Title	Length
1.	"Woolworm"	7:25
