= Indian Summer (American band) =

American emo band

Background information
- Also known as: From Ashes Of...
- Origin: Oakland, California, United States
- Genres: Emo; post-hardcore; screamo
- Years active: 1993–1994
- Labels: Repercussion Records; futurerecordings; The Numero Group
- Past members: Adam Nanaa; Seth Nanaa; Dan Bradley; Eyad Kaileh; Marc Bianchi

Indian Summer was an American emo band from Oakland, California.

== History ==
The band was created after the band Sinker broke up, and consisted of twin brothers Adam and Seth Nanaa, Marc Bianchi, and Eyad Kaileh, who replaced Dan Bradley early on due to commitment issues. They named their band after a Doors song from the 1970 album Morrison Hotel.

The band released a 7-inch EP, three splits with Current, Embassy and Ordination of Aaron, appeared in two compilations, and played nearly 100 gigs before disbanding. Science 1994, a compilation of Indian Summer's discography, was released in 2002 and Hidden Arithmetic, an entirely live album consisting of one live set and a live radio broadcast, was released in 2006, both on the Future Recordings label.

AllMusic described Indian Summer as "one of the more exciting and influential bands in a crop of underground acts that defined an obscure but inspired era of American emo." Science 1994 was named as the 37th best emo album by Rolling Stone.

A compilation of their entire studio discography titled Giving Birth to Thunder was released by The Numero Group in 2019. Pitchfork named the release a "Best New Reissue" in September 2019.

In a Reddit AMA in 2024, Kaileh revealed that the former members had been offered to reunite by Numero for the release of Giving Birth to Thunder, but the former members couldn't agree on it and the plan fell through.

== Influences ==
The band was influenced by many of their contemporaries, including Heroin, Rites of Spring, Moss Icon, Slint, Codeine, Fugazi, Seam, and Bedhead. Kaileh's drumming was specifically influenced by the likes of Man Is the Bastard, Econochrist, Filth, Neurosis, and Miles Davis.

== Discography ==
=== Extended plays ===
- Indian Summer (1993, Repercussion Records)
- Current/Indian Summer (1993, initial pressing on Homemade Records, reprint on Repercussion)
- Embassy/Indian Summer (1994, Slave Cut Records)
- Speed Kills (1994, Inchworm Records)

=== Compilations ===
- Science 1994 (2002, Future Recordings)
- Giving Birth to Thunder (2019, The Numero Group)

=== Live albums ===
- Live - Blue Universe (1999, Star 13)

=== Compilation appearances ===
- A Food Not Bombs Benefit LP (1994, Inchworm)
- Ghost Dance double 7-inch (1994, Slave Cut)
- Eucalyptus (1995, Tree Records)

== Members ==
- Adam Nanaa (vocals, guitars)
- Dan Bradley (drums)
- Eyad Kaileh (drums)
- Marc Bianchi (vocals, guitars)
- Seth Nanaa (vocals, bass)
